= 2013 Campeonato Maranhense =

Campeonato Maranhense de Futebol
- Season: 2013
- Champions: Maranhão Atlético
- Relegated: São José; Americano
- Copa do Brasil: Maranhão Atlético
- Matches played: 78
- Goals scored: 243 (3.12 per match)
- Top goalscorer: Lindoval (Imperatriz - 7 goals

The 2013 Campeonato Maranhense de Futebol was the 96th edition of the Maranhão's top professional football league. The competition began on February 17, and ended on June 12. Maranhão Atlético Clube won the championship for the 14th time, while São José and Americano were relegated.

== Format ==
In the first stage, there are two rounds. Each round is a round-robin. The four best teams in each round advances to a playoff, so the winner of the round can be determined.

In the final stage, each round winner plays in the final. If the same team wins both rounds, that team is the champion.

=== Qualifications ===
The champion qualifies to the 2014 Copa do Brasil.

== Participating teams ==
Club	Home city	2012 result
Americano	Bacabal	2nd (2nd division)
Bacabal	Bacabal	6th
Balsas	Balsas	1st (2nd division)
Cordino	Barra do Corda	8th
Imperatriz	Imperatriz	7th
Maranhão	São Luís	2nd
Sampaio Corrêa	São Luís	1st
Santa Quitéria	Santa Quitéria do Maranhão	4th
São José de Ribamar	São José de Ribamar	5th

== First round ==
=== Standings ===
Pos	Team	Pld	W	D	L	GF	GA	GD	Pts	Qualification
1	Sampaio Corrêa	8	5	3	0	23	6	+17	18	Advanced to the Final_stage
2	Maranhão	8	4	3	1	16	8	+8	15	Advanced to the Final_stage
3	Imperatriz	8	4	2	2	14	16	−2	14	Advanced to the Final_stage
4	Bacabal	8	4	2	2	14	16	−2	14	Advanced to the Final_stage
5	Santa Quitéria	8	3	2	3	14	13	+1	11	
6	Balsas	8	2	3	3	12	14	−2	9	
7	São José-MA	8	0	6	2	9	13	−4	6	
8	Cordino	8	1	2	5	14	16	−2	5	
9	Americano-MA	8	1	1	6	8	21	−13	4	

=== Results ===
Home \ Away	AME	BAC	BAL	COR	IMP	MAR	SAM	SQI	SJM
Americano-MA			2–2			0–4	1–4		2–1
Bacabal	2–1			2–1				2–1	2–2
Balsas		3–1		3–1	0–3			1–2	
Cordino	2–1				2–3	1–1			1–1
Imperatriz	2–0	2–2				0–1		2–0	
Maranhão		2–3	2–2				0–0		3–0
Sampaio Corrêa		4–0	2–0	6–0	3–1				
Santa Quitéria	4–1			1–0		2–3	2–2		
São José-MA			1–1		0–0		2–2	2–2	

Legend: Blue = home team win; Yellow = draw; Red = away team win.

=== Playoffs ===
Semifinals
1	Sampaio Corrêa	0	0	0
4	Bacabal	1	0	1
2	Maranhão	0	0	0
3	Imperatriz	1	0	1

Finals
4	Bacabal	3	0	3
2	Imperatriz	3	1	4

==== Semifinals ====
===== First leg =====
March 21, 2013
20:15 UTC−03:00

Bacabal	1–0	Sampaio Corrêa

Estádio José Luís Correa, Bacabal

March 21, 2013
20:15 UTC−03:00

Imperatriz	1–0	Maranhão

Estádio Frei Epifânio D'Abadia, Imperatriz

===== Second leg =====
March 24, 2013
17:00 UTC−03:00

Maranhão	0–0	Imperatriz

Estádio Nhozinho Santos, São Luís

March 25, 2013
20:15 UTC−03:00

Sampaio Corrêa	0–0	Bacabal

Estádio Nhozinho Santos, São Luís

==== Finals ====
March 28, 2013
20:15 UTC−03:00

Bacabal	3–3	Imperatriz
Pedro Gusmão 11'; Erlon 42'; Pedro Gusmão 90'		Kelson 22'; Cláudio André 25'; Yuri 59'

Estádio José Luís Correa, Bacabal
Referee: Juscelino Souza Santos

March 31, 2013
19:30 UTC−03:00

Imperatriz	1–0	Bacabal
Rubens 45+1'

Estádio Frei Epifânio D'Abadia, Imperatriz
Referee: Gladstonni Viana de Oliveira

Sociedade Imperatriz de Desportos won the first round and qualifies to the Final stage.

== Second round ==
=== Standings ===
Pos	Team	Pld	W	D	L	GF	GA	GD	Pts	Qualification
1	Sampaio Corrêa	8	6	2	0	18	5	+13	20	Advanced to the Final_stage
2	Maranhão	8	6	1	1	18	7	+11	19	Advanced to the Final_stage
3	Bacabal	8	4	1	3	17	10	+7	13	Advanced to the Final_stage
4	Cordino	8	4	1	3	13	11	+2	13	Advanced to the Final_stage
5	Imperatriz	8	3	1	4	10	10	0	10	
6	Balsas	8	3	0	5	12	16	−4	9	
7	São José-MA	8	2	2	4	10	11	−1	8	
8	Santa Quitéria	8	1	2	5	8	18	−10	5	
9	Americano-MA	8	1	2	5	6	23	−17	5	

Rules for classification: 1) points; 2) goal difference; 3) number of goals scored.

=== Results ===
Home \ Away	AME	BAC	BAL	COR	IMP	MAR	SAM	SQI	SJM
Americano-MA		1–6		1–3	1–0			2–2	
Bacabal			4–0		1–3	0–1	0–0		
Balsas	4–0					2–4	1–2		2–1
Cordino		1–3	2–0				0–1	3–2	
Imperatriz			3–1	2–1			1–1		1–2
Maranhão	3–1			1–1	2–0			3–0	
Sampaio Corrêa	5–0					2–1		5–1	2–1
Santa Quitéria		1–2	0–2		1–0				1–1
São José-MA	0–0	3–1		1–2		1–2			

Legend: Blue = home team win; Yellow = draw; Red = away team win.

=== Playoffs ===
Semifinals
1	Sampaio Corrêa	1	2	3
4	Cordino	0	0	0
2	Maranhão	0	2	2
3	Bacabal	2	0	2

Finals
4	Sampaio Corrêa	0	2	2
2	Maranhão	1	2	3

==== Semifinals ====
===== First leg =====
May 16, 2013
16:00 UTC−03:00

Cordino	0–1	Sampaio Corrêa

Estádio Municipal Leandro Cláudio da Silva, Barra do Corda

May 16, 2013
20:00 UTC−03:00

Bacabal	2–0	Maranhão

Estádio José Luís Correa, Bacabal

===== Second leg =====
May 19, 2013
17:00 UTC−03:00

Maranhão	2–0	Bacabal

Estádio Nhozinho Santos, São Luís

May 20, 2013
20:15 UTC−03:00

Sampaio Corrêa	2–0	Cordino

Estádio Nhozinho Santos, São Luís

==== Finals ====
May 23, 2013
20:15 UTC−03:00

Maranhão	1–0	Sampaio Corrêa
Ideílson 4'

Estádio Nhozinho Santos, São Luís

May 26, 2013
17:00 UTC−03:00

Sampaio Corrêa	2–2	Maranhão
Célio Codô 55' (pen.), 66'		Casagrande 10', 39'

Castelão, São Luís

Maranhão Atlético Clube won the second round and qualifies to the Final stage.

== Final stage ==
June 5, 2013
19:30 UTC−03:00

Imperatriz	1–0	Maranhão
Lindoval 23'

Estádio Frei Epifânio D'Abadia, Imperatriz

June 12, 2013
21:00 UTC−03:00

Maranhão	2–1	Imperatriz
Casagrande 50' (pen.), 56'		Rubens 40'

Estádio Nhozinho Santos, São Luís
Referee: Gladstonni de Oliveira

Maranhão won the 2013 Campeonato Brasiliense.

== Final standings ==
Pos	Team	Pld	W	D	L	GF	GA	GD	Pts	Qualification or relegation
1	Maranhão (C)	24	13	6	5	40	22	+18	45	Qualified to Copa do Brasil
2	Imperatriz	22	10	5	7	30	23	+7	35	
3	Sampaio Corrêa	22	13	7	2	46	15	+31	46	
4	Bacabal	22	10	5	7	37	32	+5	35	
5	Cordino	18	5	3	10	27	30	−3	18	
6	Balsas	16	5	3	8	24	30	−6	18	
7	Santa Quitéria	15	4	4	7	22	31	−9	16	
8	São José-MA (R)	16	2	8	6	19	24	−5	14	Relegated
9	Americano-MA (R)	16	2	3	11	14	44	−30	9	Relegated

Rules for classification: 1) points; 2) goal difference; 3) number of goals scored.
(C) Champions; (R) Relegated
