= Wanderson (footballer, born 24 October 1994) =

Brazilian footballer (born 1994)

Personal information
- Full name: Wanderson Camelo Viana
- Date of birth: 24 October 1994 (age 32)
- Place of birth: São Luís, Brazil
- Height: 1.87 m (6 ft 2 in)
- Position: Centre-back

Team information
- Current team: Náutico
- Number: 43

Youth career
- Americano-MA
- 2014: Sabiá

Senior career*
Years	Team	Apps	(Gls)
2012–2013	Americano-MA	4	(1)
2014–2015	Araioses	3	(0)
2016–2018	Moto Club	59	(5)
2017	→ Timon (loan)	6	(2)
2018	→ Juventude Samas (loan)	6	(0)
2018	Maranhão	0	(0)
2019	Sampaio Corrêa	8	(0)
2019	Guarany de Sobral	0	(0)
2020	Juventude Samas	1	(0)
2020	Maranhão	2	(0)
2020	Juventude Samas	1	(0)
2020	Atlético de Cajazeiras	1	(0)
2021	Moto Club	18	(1)
2021–2022	Tocantinópolis	36	(3)
2023–2024	Paysandu	62	(1)
2025	CSA	7	(0)
2025	Ponte Preta	26	(1)
2026–	Náutico	31	(1)
- * Club domestic league appearances and goals as of 18 November 2026

Wanderson Camelo Viana (born 24 October 1994), simply known as Wanderson, is a Brazilian footballer who plays as a centre-back for Náutico.

== Career ==
Born in São Luís, Maranhão, Wanderson began his career with Americano-MA in 2012. In 2014, after a short spell with the under-20 side of Sabiá for the year's Copa São Paulo de Futebol Júnior, he moved to Araioses, but only appeared rarely.

Ahead of the 2016 season, Wanderson signed for Moto Club, where he managed to become a starter and helped the club to achieve promotion to the Série C. He also served loan stints at Timon and Juventude Samas before departing the club in July 2018.

In December 2018, after a period at Maranhão, Wanderson was announced at Imperatriz, but moved to Sampaio Corrêa instead. He finished the 2019 season at Guarany de Sobral, before being announced at River on 11 December of that year; however, he left the club shortly after alleging personal issues, and later returned to Juventude Samas.

On 30 June 2020, Wanderson returned to MAC, but only featured twice before returning to Juventude in September. In October, however, he moved to Atlético de Cajazeiras, and later returned to Moto in January.

Released by Moto on 1 September 2021, and signed for Tocantinópolis in November. On 10 December 2022, he agreed to a deal with Paysandu.

On 17 November 2023, after helping Papão to achieve promotion to the Série B, Wanderson renewed his contract with the club.

== Career statistics ==
As of 21 November 2024.

Club	Season	League			State League		Cup		Continental		Other		Total	
Club	Season	Division	Apps	Goals	Apps	Goals	Apps	Goals	Apps	Goals	Apps	Goals	Apps	Goals
Americano-MA	2012	Maranhense 2ª Divisão	—		4	1	—		—		—		4	1
Araioses	2014	Maranhense	—		2	0	—		—		—		2	0
Araioses	2015	Maranhense	—		1	0	—		—		—		1	0
Araioses	Total		—		3	0	—		—		—		3	0
Moto Club	2016	Série D	14	2	16	0	—		—		—		30	2
Moto Club	2017	Série C	4	0	6	2	1	0	—		6 (Note: Appearance(s) in Copa do Nordeste)	0	17	2
Moto Club	2017	Série D	8	1	11	0	—		—		—		19	1
Moto Club	Total		26	3	33	2	1	0	—		6	0	66	5
Timon (loan)	2017	Maranhense 2ª Divisão	—		6	2	—		—		—		6	2
Juventude Samas (loan)	2018	Maranhense 2ª Divisão	—		6	0	—		—		—		6	0
Maranhão	2018	Série D	—		—		—		—		4 (Note: Appearance(s) in Copa Federação Maranhense de Futebol)	0	4	0
Sampaio Corrêa	2019	Série C	0	0	8	0	0	0	—		6	0	14	0
Guarany de Sobral	2019	Cearense	—		—		—		—		7 (Note: Appearance(s) in Copa Fares Lopes)	0	7	0
Juventude Samas	2020	Série D	0	0	2	0	—		—		—		2	0
Maranhão	2020	Maranhense	—		2	0	—		—		—		2	0
Atlético de Cajazeiras	2020	Série D	1	0	—		—		—		—		1	0
Moto Club	2021	Série D	11	1	7	1	1	0	—		2	0	21	2
Tocantinópolis	2021	Série D	—		4	0	—		—		—		4	0
Tocantinópolis	2022	Série D	19	1	13	2	4	0	—		2 (Note: Appearance(s) in Copa Verde)	0	38	3
Tocantinópolis	Total		19	1	17	2	4	0	—		2	0	42	3
Paysandu	2023	Série C	20	1	7	0	1	0	—		6	0	34	1
Paysandu	2024	Série B	23	0	12	0	1	0	—		6	0	42	0
Paysandu	Total		43	1	19	0	2	0	—		12	0	76	1
Career total			100	6	107	8	8	0	0	0	39	0	254	14

== Honours ==
Moto Club

- Campeonato Maranhense: 2016, 2018

Maranhão

- Copa Federação Maranhense de Futebol: 2018

Tocantinópolis

- Campeonato Tocantinense: 2021, 2022

Paysandu

- Campeonato Paraense: 2024
- Copa Verde: 2024
