= Ted Love =

Brazilian footballer

Personal information
- Full name: Eduardo dos Santos Souza
- Date of birth: 10 April 1991 (age 35)
- Place of birth: São Luís, Brazil
- Height: 1.68 m (5 ft 6 in)
- Position: Forward

Senior career*
Years	Team	Apps	(Gls)
2009–2011	Uberlândia		
2011–2012	Viana		
2012	Americano-MA		
2012	São José-MA		
2013	Ferroviário		
2013	Guarany de Sobral		
2014	Remo		
2014	Americano-MA		
2014	Tiradentes-CE		
2015	Imperatriz		
2015	Palmas		
2016	São Francisco-PA		
2017	São José-MA		
2017–2021	4 de Julho		
2021–2022	Moto Club		
2022	→ Paragominas (loan)		
2022	IAPE		
2024	4 de Julho		
2024	IAPE		
- * Club domestic league appearances and goals as of 12 October 2025

Eduardo dos Santos Souza (born 10 April 1991), better known as Ted Love, is a Brazilian professional footballer who plays as a forward.

== Career ==
Having spells at several clubs in the north and northeast regions of Brazil, Ted Love stood out for his good performances for 4 de Julho de Piripiri. He earned his nickname from a Luís Miguel, 4 de Julho manager, due to the fact that he frequently changed girlfriends. In 2020, he was top scorer and a great highlight of the club in winning the Piauí title. He also had experience in fut7 tournaments. On 10 January 2024, he announced his return to professional football, again on the 4 de Julho.

== Honours ==
Remo

- Campeonato Paraense: 2014

Imperatriz

- Campeonato Maranhense: 2015

4 de Julho

- Campeonato Piauiense: 2020

Individual

- 2020 Campeonato Piauiense top scorer: 10 goals
