= Clessione =

Brazilian footballer

Personal information
- Full name: Clessione Santos Silva
- Date of birth: 15 June 1994 (age 32)
- Place of birth: Tutóia, Brazil
- Height: 1.75 m (5 ft 9 in)
- Position: Forward

Team information
- Current team: Manauara

Senior career*
Years	Team	Apps	(Gls)
2018–2019	Santa Quitéria	1	(1)
2020	Moto Club	1	(0)
2020	Itapipoca	11	(3)
2021	Timon	9	(3)
2022	Pinheiro	8	(0)
2022	Juventude Samas	15	(1)
2022	Maranhão	8	(3)
2023	Bahia de Feira	13	(0)
2024–2025	Maranhão	54	(17)
2026	São José-SP	20	(8)
2026–	Manauara	0	(0)
- * Club domestic league appearances and goals as of 19:31, 22 April 2026 (UTC)

Clessione Santos Silva (born 15 June 1994), simply known as Clessione, is a Brazilian footballer who plays as a forward for Manauara.

== Career ==
Born in Tutóia, Maranhão, Clessione played amateur football before joining the squad of Santa Quitéria in the 2018 season. He later played for Moto Club, Itapipoca and Timon before moving to Pinheiro for the 2022 campaign.

On 22 April 2022, Clessione was announced at Juventude Samas. He signed for Maranhão in August, but was presented in the squad of Bahia de Feira in December.

In November 2023, Clessione returned to MAC for the ensuing season. Despite struggling with injuries, he renewed his contract for a further year on 5 November 2024, and was the top scorer of the club in the 2025 Série D as they achieved promotion.

On 2 October 2025, Clessione left Maranhão after failing to agree new terms. On 12 November, he was announced at São José-SP.

== Career statistics ==
As of 22 April 2026

Club	Season	League			State League		Cup		Continental		Other		Total	
Club	Season	Division	Apps	Goals	Apps	Goals	Apps	Goals	Apps	Goals	Apps	Goals	Apps	Goals
Santa Quitéria	2018	Maranhense	—		1	1	—		—		0	0	1	1
Santa Quitéria	2019	Maranhense	—		0	0	—		—		5 (Note: Appearance(s) in Copa Federação Maranhense de Futebol)	3	5	3
Santa Quitéria	Total		—		1	1	—		—		5	3	6	4
Moto Club	2020	Série D	—		1	0	1	0	—		—		2	0
Itapipoca	2020	Cearense Série B	—		11	3	—		—		—		11	3
Timon	2021	Maranhense Série B	—		9	3	—		—		—		9	3
Pinheiro	2022	Maranhense	—		8	0	—		—		—		8	0
Juventude Samas	2022	Série D	15	1	—		—		—		—		15	1
Maranhão	2022	Maranhense Série B	—		8	3	—		—		—		8	3
Bahia de Feira	2023	Série D	4	0	9	0	1	0	—		—		14	0
Maranhão	2024	Série D	4	0	13	4	1	1	—		6 (Note: Appearance(s) in Copa do Nordeste)	3	24	8
Maranhão	2025	Série D	21	7	16	6	1	0	—		1	0	39	13
Maranhão	Total		25	7	29	10	2	1	—		7	3	63	21
São José-SP	2026	Paulista A2	—		20	8	—		—		—		20	8
Manauara	2026	Série D	0	0	—		—		—		—		0	0
Career total			44	8	96	28	4	1	0	0	12	6	156	43

== Honours ==
Maranhão

- Campeonato Maranhense Série B: 2022
- Campeonato Maranhense: 2025
