= Dejair (footballer, born 1977) =

Brazilian footballer (born 1977)

Personal information
- Full name: Dejair Jorge Ferreira
- Date of birth: 14 December 1977 (age 48)
- Place of birth: Brasília, Brazil
- Height: 1.76 m (5 ft 9 in)
- Position: Midfielder

Team information
- Current team: Sampaio Corrêa (assistant)

Senior career*
Years	Team	Apps	(Gls)
1995	Botafogo-DF		
1996–1998	Botafogo		
1999	Sampaio Corrêa		
2000	Moto Club		
2000	ABC		
2001	Olaria		
2001	Vila Nova	22	(8)
2002	Vitória		
2002–2003	Criciúma	85	(29)
2004	Atlético Mineiro	27	(5)
2006	Criciúma	32	(13)
2007	São Caetano	14	(1)
2007	Náutico	5	(1)
2008	Bacabal		
2008	ABC		
2008	Chivas USA	3	(1)
2009	Brasil de Pelotas		
2010	Sampaio Corrêa		

Managerial career
- 2011–2015: Sampaio Corrêa (assistant)
- 2020: Moto Club (assistant)
- 2020: Moto Club
- 2020: Timon-PI
- 2021: Parnahyba
- 2021: River
- 2021: Corisabbá
- 2021: Juventude Samas
- 2022: São José-MA
- 2022: Imperatriz
- 2022: Tuntum
- 2023: Chapadinha
- 2023: Tuntum
- 2023–: Sampaio Corrêa (assistant)
- 2023: Sampaio Corrêa (interim)
- * Club domestic league appearances and goals

Dejair Jorge Ferreira (born 14 December 1977), known as Dejair, is a Brazilian football coach and former player who played as a midfielder. He is the current assistant coach of Sampaio Corrêa.

Dejair played in Major League Soccer for Chivas USA after signing in September 2008. He has played in Brazil for Botafogo, Sampaio Corrêa, Moto Club, ABC, Olaria, Vila Nova, Vitória, Criciúma, Atlético Mineiro, São Caetano, Náutico and Ceará. He missed the 2005 season through injury.
