= Zé Augusto (footballer, born 1978) =

Brazilian footballer

Personal information
- Full name: José Augusto Freitas Sousa
- Date of birth: 2 August 1978 (age 48)
- Place of birth: São Luís, Brazil
- Height: 1.70 m (5 ft 7 in)
- Position: Midfielder

Team information
- Current team: Altos (head coach)

Senior career*
Years	Team	Apps	(Gls)
2002–2003	Sampaio Corrêa		(17)
2003	Ituano		(5)
2004	América-SP		(4)
2004	ASA		
2004	Sampaio Corrêa		
2004	Al Qadsiah	8	(2)
2005	Al-Hazem		(5)
2006	Madureira		
2006	Paysandu	28	(3)
2006	Bangu	15	(0)
2007	Madureira	11	(1)
2007	Ceará	22	(4)
2008–2010	Icasa	14	(3)
2008	→ Busan IPark (loan)	2	(0)
2008–2009	→ Sampaio Corrêa (loan)	3	(0)
2010	→ Sousa (loan)	9	(0)
2010	Maranhão		
2010	Moto Club		
2011–2012	Guarani de Juazeiro	42	(7)
2011	→ Fortaleza (loan)	3	(0)
2012	Uniclinic	11	(2)
2012	Guarany de Sobral	3	(0)
2013–2014	Volta Redonda	28	(1)
2014	Uniclinic	7	(4)
2015	Guarani de Juazeiro	10	(0)
2017	Santa Quitéria	6	(1)

Managerial career
- 2017: Santa Quitéria U20
- 2017: Santa Quitéria (assistant)
- 2018: Moto Club (assistant)
- 2018: Sampaio Corrêa (assistant)
- 2020–2021: IAPE
- 2021: Moto Club
- 2022: IAPE
- 2022: Juventude-MA
- 2022–2024: Maranhão
- 2024: Sampaio Corrêa
- 2024: River
- 2025: Moto Club
- 2025: Sampaio Corrêa
- 2026–: Altos
- * Club domestic league appearances and goals

Jose Augusto Freitas Sousa (born 2 August 1978), commonly known as Zé Augusto, is a Brazilian football coach and former player who played as a striker. He is the current head coach of Altos.

== Playing career ==
He played for several clubs, including Sampaio Corrêa, Ituano, América-SP, Al-Qadisiya, Al Hazm, Paysandu, Madureira, Bangu and Ceará.

He appeared in the Copa do Brasil for Sampaio Correa, Paysandu and Madureira.

== Honours ==
=== Player ===
Moto Club

- Campeonato Maranhense Segunda Divisão: 2010

Uniclinic

- Campeonato Cearense Série C: 2014
