= Hiltinho =

Brazilian footballer (born 1985)

Personal information
- Full name: Hilton Conceição de Sousa
- Date of birth: 8 December 1985 (age 40)
- Place of birth: Cantanhede, Brazil
- Position: Midfielder

Team information
- Current team: 4 de Julho

Senior career*
Years	Team	Apps	(Gls)
2010–2011	IAPE		
2011–2012	Maranhão		
2012	São José–MA		
2013	Potiguar de Mossoró		
2013	Maranhão	7	(3)
2014	Sampaio Corrêa	39	(4)
2015	Boa Esporte	10	(0)
2015	Náutico	35	(3)
2016	Itumbiara	14	(3)
2016	Paysandu	3	(0)
2016–2017	Sampaio Corrêa	40	(3)
2018	Cuiabá	10	(0)
2018	Juventude–MA	3	(0)
2019	América-RN	24	(3)
2019	Ferroviário	4	(1)
2020	Marcílio Dias	2	(0)
2020	Sergipe	6	(0)
2020	Juventude-MA	14	(1)
2021–	4 de Julho	20	(4)
- * Club domestic league appearances and goals as of 16:11, 27 December 2019 (UTC)

Hilton Conceição de Sousa (born 8 December 1985), known as Hiltinho, is a Brazilian footballer who plays as a midfielder for 4 de Julho.

== Career statistics ==
As of 18 April 2019

Appearances and goals by club, season and competition
Club	Season	League			State League		Cup		Continental		Other		Total	
Club	Season	Division	Apps	Goals	Apps	Goals	Apps	Goals	Apps	Goals	Apps	Goals	Apps	Goals
IAPE	2011	Maranhense	—		—		1	0	—		—		1	0
Maranhão	2013	Série D	7	3	—		—		—		—		7	3
Sampaio Corrêa	2014	Série B	31	2	—		0	0	—		—		31	2
Boa Esporte	2015	Série B	—		10	0	1	0	—		—		11	0
Náutico	2015	Série B	35	3	—		—		—		—		35	3
Itumbiara	2016	Goiano	—		14	3	—		—		—		14	3
Paysandu	2016	Série B	3	0	—		1	0	—		—		4	0
Sampaio Corrêa	2016	Série B	10	0	—		—		—		—		10	0
Sampaio Corrêa	2017	Série C	18	2	—		3	0	—		4 (Note: Appearance(s) in Copa do Nordeste)	1	25	3
Sampaio Corrêa	Total		28	2	0	0	3	0	0	0	4	1	35	3
Cuiabá	2018	Série C	10	0	—		4	0	—		4 (Note: Appearance(s) in Copa Verde)	1	18	1
América de Natal	2019	Série D	—		15	2	2	0	—		—		17	2
Career total			114	10	39	5	12	0	0	0	8	2	173	17
