= Marcelo Mendes (footballer) =

Brazilian football manager and former player

Personal information
- Full name: Marcelo Cláudio Mendes Pereira
- Date of birth: 2 March 1979 (age 47)
- Place of birth: Cajapió, Brazil
- Height: 1.77 m (5 ft 10 in)
- Position: Defensive midfielder

Team information
- Current team: Operário Ferroviário (assistant)

Youth career
- Americano-MA
- Juventus-SP

Senior career*
Years	Team	Apps	(Gls)
1999–2001	Juventus-SP		
2002–2003	Ceará		
2004	Joinville		
2005	Campinense		
2005	Rioverdense		
2006	Ferroviário		
2007	Horizonte		
2007–2008	Madureira	5	(0)
2007	→ Bangu (loan)	4	(0)
2008–2009	Sampaio Corrêa	35	(1)
2010	Horizonte	15	(0)
2010	Viana		
2011	Ferroviário	16	(0)
2011	São José-MA	6	(0)
2012	Imperatriz	6	(0)
2012–2013	Americano-MA		
2013	Boa Esporte	1	(0)
2013	Tricordiano		

Managerial career
- 2015: Americano-MA
- 2016: Araioses
- 2016–2017: Americano-MA U20
- 2017: Americano-MA (interim)
- 2017: Sampaio Corrêa U20 (assistant)
- 2018: Sampaio Corrêa U20
- 2019–2021: Sampaio Corrêa (assistant)
- 2022: Tombense (assistant)
- 2023–: Operário Ferroviário (assistant)
- * Club domestic league appearances and goals

Marcelo Cláudio Mendes Pereira (2 March 1979), known as Marcelo Mendes, is a Brazilian football coach and former player who played as a defensive midfielder. He is the current assistant coach of Operário Ferroviário.

== Playing career ==
Born in Cajapió, Maranhão, Marcelo Mendes started his career with local side Americano-MA before moving to Juventus-SP, where he made his debut as a senior in 1999. In 2001 he moved to Ceará, and featured regularly for the club as they retained their Série B status.

Marcelo Mendes moved to Joinville for the 2004 campaign, and subsequently failed to settle for a club in the remainder of his career. He represented Campinense, Rioverdense, Ferroviário (two stints), Horizonte (two stints), Madureira, Bangu (on loan), Sampaio Corrêa, Viana, São José-MA, Imperatriz, Americano-MA, Boa Esporte and Tricordiano. He retired with the latter in 2013, aged 34.

== Managerial career ==
After retiring, Marcelo Mendes had his first managerial experience in 2015, while in charge of his first club Americano-MA. In 2016, he took over Araioses for the year's Campeonato Maranhense, but his reign only lasted six matches.

Marcelo Mendes subsequently returned to Americano, being an under-20 and interim manager before rejoining another club he represented as a player, Sampaio Corrêa, in 2017. Initially an assistant of the under-20 team, he was named manager of the squad in 2018, and was appointed assistant of the first team in 2019.

In April 2021, after the dismissal of Rafael Guanaes, Marcelo Mendes was named interim manager of the main squad, but did not manage the club in any match as they appointed Daniel Neri.

== Honours ==
=== Player ===
Ceará

- Campeonato Cearense: 2002
