= Marcinho Guerreiro (footballer, born 1978) =

Brazilian footballer and manager

Personal information
- Full name: Márcio André Correia Cantanhede
- Date of birth: 6 November 1978 (age 47)
- Place of birth: São Luís, Brazil
- Height: 1.72 m (5 ft 8 in)
- Position: Defensive midfielder

Team information
- Current team: Imperatriz (head coach)

Senior career*
Years	Team	Apps	(Gls)
2000–2004	Moto Club	35	(2)
2005	Uniclinic		
2006	Paysandu		
2006	América de Natal		
2007	Icasa		
2007	Fortaleza		
2008	Sampaio Corrêa		
2009	Moto Club		
2010	Treze		
2011	Icasa		
2011–2012	Guarani de Juazeiro		
2012	Guarany de Sobral		
2013	Moto Club		
2014	Guarani de Juazeiro		

Managerial career
- 2015: Guarani de Juazeiro
- 2018: Moto Club
- 2018: Imperatriz
- 2018: Sampaio Corrêa
- 2019: Maranhão
- 2019: Treze
- 2019: River-PI
- 2019: Chapadinha
- 2020: Caucaia
- 2020: Guarani de Juazeiro
- 2020–2021: Moto Club
- 2021: Juventude Samas
- 2022: Paragominas
- 2022: Cordino
- 2022: Timon
- 2023: Cordino
- 2023: Moto Club
- 2023: Timon
- 2024: Moto Club
- 2024: Central
- 2024: Pinheiro
- 2024: Decisão
- 2025: Fluminense-PI
- 2025–2026: Maranhão
- 2026–: Imperatriz
- * Club domestic league appearances and goals

Márcio André Correia Cantanhede, known as Marcinho Guerreiro (born 6 November 1978 in São Luís), is a Brazilian football coach and former player who played as defensive midfielder. He is the current head coach of Imperatriz.

== Honours ==
=== Player ===
Moto Club

- Campeonato Maranhense: 2000, 2001, 2004
- Copa União do Maranhão: 2003, 2004

Fortaleza

- Campeonato Cearense: 2008

Treze

- Campeonato Paraibano: 2010

Guarani de Juazeiro

- Copa Fares Lopes: 2012

=== Coach ===
Moto Club

- Campeonato Maranhense: 2018

Maranhão

- Campeonato Maranhense: 2025
