= Pimentinha =

Brazilian footballer

Personal information
- Full name: Anderson Wanderllan de Moraes Rodrigues
- Date of birth: 13 September 1987 (age 39)
- Place of birth: São Luís, Brazil
- Height: 1.65 m (5 ft 5 in)
- Position: Left winger

Team information
- Current team: Maranhão

Senior career*
Years	Team	Apps	(Gls)
2011	Moto Club	6	(5)
2012	São José-MA	8	(6)
2012–2017	Sampaio Corrêa	26	(10)
2013–2014	→ São Caetano (loan)	8	(0)
2017	→ Criciúma (loan)	10	(0)
2017	→ Remo (loan)	10	(1)
2018	Luverdense	6	(2)
2018–2019	Botafogo-SP	30	(2)
2019	→ Paysandu (loan)	7	(0)
2019	Paraná	8	(0)
2020	Botafogo-PB	5	(1)
2020–2025	Sampaio Corrêa	178	(12)
2025	IAPE		
2026–	Maranhão	17	
- * Club domestic league appearances and goals as of 10 November 2026

Anderson Wanderllan de Moraes Rodrigues (born 13 September 1987), better known as Pimentinha, is a Brazilian professional footballer who plays as a left winger for Maranhão.

== Career ==
Pimentinha emerged as a highlight of Sampaio Corrêa campaign to the 2012 Campeonato Brasileiro Série D title. He played for a few other teams, but it was at "Bolivia Querida" where he created identification with supporter and won titles.

In May 2025, after more than 300 appearances, 44 goals scored and 12 seasons for Sampaio Corrêa, Pimentinha announced his departure from the club. On August 11, he was announced by IAPE as a reinforcement for the dispute of Campeonato Maranhense Second Division.

== Honours ==
Sampaio Corrêa

- Campeonato Brasileiro Série D: 2012
- Campeonato Maranhense: 2021, 2022, 2024
- Copa União do Maranhão: 2012
