= Campeonato Maranhense Série B =

Football league in Maranhão, Brazil

- Organising body: FMF
- Founded: 1921; 105 years ago
- Country: Brazil
- State: Maranhão
- Level on pyramid: 2
- Promotion to: Campeonato Maranhense
- Current champions: Luminense (1st title) (2025)
- Most championships: IAPE; Maranhão; Moto Club; Santa Quitéria (2 titles each)
- Website: FMF Official website

The Campeonato Maranhense Série B, also known as Campeonato Maranhense Second Division, is the second tier of the professional state football league in the Brazilian state of Maranhão. It is run by the Maranhão Football Federation (FMF).

== List of champions ==
Season	Champions	Runners-up
1921	Colombo (1)	Paysandu Maranhense
1922–1992	Not held	
1993	Coroatá (1)	Porto Franco
1994–2000	Not held	
2001	Not awarded	
2002	Chapadinha (1)	Falcão
2003	Not held	
2004	Comerciário (1)	Americano
2005	Santa Quitéria (1)	Juventude
2006	Santa Luzia (1)	Nacional
2007	Itinga (1)	São José
2008	IAPE (1)	JV Lideral
2009	Santa Quitéria (2)	Viana
2010	Moto Club (1)	Cordino
2011	Sabiá (1)	Viana
2012	Balsas (1)	Americano
2013	Moto Club (2)	Araioses
2014	Expressinho (1)	Sabiá
2015	Maranhão (1)	Marília
2016	Americano (1)	Pinheiro
2017	Bacabal (1)	Timon
2018	Pinheiro (1)	Chapadinha
2019	Juventude (1)	Babaçu
2020	IAPE (2)	Bacabal
2021	Cordino (1)	Tuntum
2022	Maranhão (2)	Chapadinha
2023	Tuntum (1)	Imperatriz
2024	Real Codó (1)	IAPE
2025	Luminense (1)	ITZ Sports

=== Notes ===
1. Tocantins de Imperatriz, 2001 edition winners, were stripped of their title.
2. Juventude has moved from Caxias to São Mateus do Maranhão.
3. Timon lost the 2020 edition title in the sports court.

=== Titles by team ===
Teams in bold still active.

Rank	Club	Winners	Winning years
1	**IAPE**	2	2008, 2020
1	**Maranhão**	2	2015, 2022
1	**Moto Club**	2	2010, 2013
1	Santa Quitéria	2	2005, 2009
5	**Americano**	1	2016
5	**Bacabal**	1	2017
5	Balsas	1	2012
5	**Chapadinha**	1	2002
5	Colombo	1	1921
5	**Comerciário**	1	2004
5	**Cordino**	1	2021
5	Coroatá	1	1993
5	**Expressinho**	1	2014
5	Itinga	1	2007
5	**Juventude**	1	2019
5	**Luminense**	1	2025
5	**Pinheiro**	1	2018
5	**Real Codó**	1	2024
5	**Sabiá**	1	2011
5	Santa Luzia	1	2006
5	**Tuntum**	1	2023

=== By city ===
City	Championships	Clubs
São Luís	9	IAPE (2), Maranhão (2), Moto Club (2), Colombo (1), Comerciário (1), Expressinho (1)
Bacabal	2	Americano (1), Bacabal (1)
Santa Quitéria do Maranhão	2	Santa Quitéria (2)
Balsas	1	Balsas (1)
Barra do Corda	1	Cordino (1)
Caxias	1	Sabiá (1)
Chapadinha	1	Chapadinha (1)
Codó	1	Real Codó (1)
Coroatá	1	Coroatá (1)
Itinga do Maranhão	1	Itinga (1)
Paço do Lumiar	1	Luminense (1)
Pinheiro	1	Pinheiro (1)
Santa Luzia	1	Santa Luzia (1)
São Mateus do Maranhão	1	Juventude (1)
Tuntum	1	Tuntum (1)
