= Mateusinho =

Brazilian footballer (born 1998)

Personal information
- Full name: Mateus da Silva Duarte
- Date of birth: 7 October 1998 (age 28)
- Place of birth: Magé, Brazil
- Height: 1.75 m (5 ft 9 in)
- Position: Right back

Team information
- Current team: Vitória
- Number: 98

Youth career
- 2018: America-RJ

Senior career*
Years	Team	Apps	(Gls)
2016	CF Rio de Janeiro	7	(1)
2017	Serrano-RJ	1	(0)
2018	Mageense	2	(0)
2020	Goytacaz	15	(0)
2021	Moto Club	4	(0)
2021	Tuntum	6	(0)
2022	Sampaio Corrêa	41	(3)
2023–2025	Cuiabá	57	(8)
2026–	Vitória	8	(1)
- * Club domestic league appearances and goals as of 8 April 2026

Mateus da Silva Duarte (born 7 October 1998), commonly known as Mateusinho, is a Brazilian professional soccer player who plays as a right back for Vitória.

== Club career ==
Born in Magé, Rio de Janeiro, Mateusinho made his senior debut with CF Rio de Janeiro in the 2016 Campeonato Carioca Série C. After playing just one match for Serrano-RJ in the 2017 Campeonato Carioca Série B1, he moved to America-RJ ahead of the 2018 season, but played for the under-20 side.

Mateusinho later played for Carioca Série C side Mageense in the remainder of the 2018 season, and remained more than a year without a club before being presented at Goytacaz in August 2020. On 8 February 2021, he joined Moto Club.

In August 2021, Mateuzinho was announced in the squad of Tuntum for the year's Campeonato Maranhense Segunda Divisão. The following 5 January, he agreed to a deal with Série B side Sampaio Corrêa.

On 18 January 2023, after being a regular starter for Sampaio during the 2022 season, Mateusinho signed a five-year contract with Série A team Cuiabá; the club paid R$ 1.3 million for 50% of his economic rights. On 31 July, his contract was suspended after being allegedly involved in the 2023 Brazilian football match-fixing scandal.

== Career statistics ==
As of 4 August 2023

Club	Season	League			State League		Cup		Continental		Other		Total	
Club	Season	Division	Apps	Goals	Apps	Goals	Apps	Goals	Apps	Goals	Apps	Goals	Apps	Goals
CF Rio de Janeiro	2016	Carioca Série C	—		7	1	—		—		—		7	1
Serrano-RJ	2017	Carioca Série B1	—		1	0	—		—		—		1	0
Mageense	2018	Carioca Série C	—		2	0	—		—		—		2	0
Goytacaz	2020	Carioca Série B1	—		15	0	—		—		—		15	0
Moto Club	2021	Série D	0	0	4	0	1	0	—		—		5	0
Tuntum	2021	Maranhense 2ª Divisão	—		6	0	—		—		7 (Note: Appearance(s) in Copa Federação Maranhense de Futebol)	6	13	6
Sampaio Corrêa	2022	Série B	34	1	7	2	2	0	—		7 (Note: Appearance(s) in Copa do Nordeste)	0	50	3
Cuiabá	2023	Série A	5	1	11	2	1	1	—		5 (Note: Appearance(s) in Copa Verde)	0	22	4
Career total			39	2	53	5	4	1	0	0	19	6	115	14

== Honras ==
Mageense

- Campeonato Carioca Série C: 2018

Tuntum

- Copa Federação Maranhense de Futebol: 2021

Sampaio Corrêa

- Campeonato Maranhense: 2022

Cuiabá

- Campeonato Matogrossense de Futebol: 2023
