= Hamilton Campos =

Brazilian footballer (born 1934)

Personal information
- Full name: Hamilton Sadias Campos
- Date of birth: 3 December 1934
- Place of birth: State of Para, Brazil
- Position: Forward

Youth career
- 1954–1956: Tuna Luso Brasilieira

Senior career*
Years	Team	Apps	(Gls)
1956–1957	Tuna Luso Brasilieira	18+	(28+)
1957–1959	Ferroviario Esporte Clube	23+	(32+)
1959–1962	Santa Cruz Futebol Clube	56+	(79+)
1963–1968	Moto Club de Sao Luis	12+	(244)
1969–1971	Maranhao Atletico Clube	4+	(104+)
Total		113+	(487+)
- * Club domestic league appearances and goals

Hamilton Sadias Campos (3 December 1934) is a Brazilian former professional footballer who played as a forward. It is said that he scored 1048 goals in a record 1450 games.

== Early life ==
Hamilton Campos was born in the State of Para. He began his life as a youth player at Tuna Luso, in 1955, at just 18 years of age, acting as a striker. Luis Antonio Reis da Cunha, of Tuna Luso, noticed his technical qualities and had no doubts about taking him to the Tuna Luso first team. After winning several titles with the junior team, he got promoted to the first team in 1956.

== Club career ==
Hamilton Campos scored 28 goals in his debut season for Tuna Luso. In 1957, Tuna Luso played in São Luís against Sampaio Corrêa. Sampaio had lost this game and scheduled a rematch in the next coming days. Estanislau, Tuna Luso’s star striker, had fallen ill in the lead up to the match, so that gave Hamilton the perfect chance to show his ability.

On 26 May 1957, he was named in the starting line-up against Sampaio Corrêa and scored four goals against them in a 4–4 draw. This was enough to spark the interest of the Ferroviario Esporte Clube board. Hamilton Campos was offered Cr$100 thousand for a two and a half year deal which he accepted. Hamilton spent a month preparing and getting used to the new club, until his debut came around. He played Sampaio Corrêa in the first round of the Campeonato Maranhense in 1957. Against Sampaio Corrêa, he already showed how good he was as a goalscorer, but Sampaio Corrêa were 2–0 up and Hamilton did nothing. The crowd started chanting, “Where's the hundred contos, where's the hundred contos?”

In 1959, due to administrative problems, the board of Ferroviario Esporte Clube decided to stop competing and dissolved the professional team. In the same year, he got an offer from Santa Cruz and it could not be ignored as Hamilton was sold for three hundred thousand reis. He arrived half way through the course of the Campeonato Pernambucano and managed to be the top scorer with eight goals and won the Campeonato Pernambucano. At Santa Cruz, Hamilton scored 71 goals for them and at one point he was even rumoured to join Botafogo, whom at the time had the likes of Nílton Santos, Mário Zagallo and Garrincha. This was negotiated highly, but unfortunately never happened.

In 1963, the president of Moto Club, Salomao Mata, brought him to Rio de Janeiro on loan. He soon showed his quality by scoring 20 goals that year. His performances allowed him to be called up for the Maranhense team. On four occasions he became the top scorer of the Campeonato Maranhense. In 1963 he scored 20 goals, in 1964 8 goals, in 1966 he scored 20 goals and in 1969 he shared the title with Gimico from Ferrim, both scoring 6 goals.

in 1963, Hamilton Campos and Atletico Clube’s Croinha were both tied with 14 goals as the Campeonato Maranhense top scorer with one game to go. In Croinha’s last games he scored five goals taking his tally to 19 goals.

Hamilton Campos also scored the fastest goal in the Campeonato Maranhense, at Moto Club. In a derby match, against Maqueanos, he dribbled the ball into the half of the Maqueanos team and passed it out to his teammate on the wing. He then crossed the ball in and Hamilton hit it first time, leaving the goalkeeper no chance to save it. The scoreboard changed before the referee’s watch passed the ten second mark.

When Hamilton Campos was asked what the best goal he scored in his career, he mentioned a game in 1966. During the match, Hamilton received a cross from the right, he body feinted two defenders and became one on one with the keeper. The keeper came flying out and with a delightful chip over the keeper, he put the ball in the back of the net.

On 21 July 1968, in a friendly match against Flamengo, Hamilton played his last game with Moto Club. His contract had expired and he had the option to renew it. He left at the age of 35 and scored an 244 goals for Moto Club.

Hamilton Campos then began playing his games for Maranhão Atlético Clube. He stayed there for three years racking up 104 goals. On his last match, he walked a lap of the pitch, at half time, with his boots in his hands, getting an applause from both sets of fans. The proceeds from the game were donated to Hamilton. A few days earlier, he was honoured in a match between Santa Cruz and Moto club, he was allowed to kick off the match.

== Legacy ==
According to Hamilton Campos himself a survey was carried out and it was proven that he scored exactly 1048 goals. Despite this Hamilton believes that his total is more than this, but due to lack of evidence we cannot back up his statement. Hamilton played a total of around 1450 matches, in 18 years of professional football, making him have a goal average of 0.72 goals per game. On six occasions he scored 6 or more goals, totalling in these games 36 goals.

Not many players have got this much recognition at regional level in their footballing career. For his contribution to Moto Club and Maranhão, he received this recognition. In December 2004, Hamilton was awarded the diploma of amendment of the order of sporting merit Rubem Goulart, in a ceremony held by the government of the State of Maranhao.

== Life after retirement ==
After retiring from football, he worked for four years as a bottling assistant at Cervamar and another four years at Brahma.
