= Lourency =

Brazilian footballer (born 1996)

Personal information
- Full name: Lourency do Nascimento Rodrigues
- Date of birth: 2 January 1996 (age 30)
- Place of birth: Imperatriz, Brazil
- Height: 1.78 m (5 ft 10 in)
- Position: Right winger

Team information
- Current team: Khor Fakkan
- Number: 7

Youth career
- 2008–2014: JV Lideral
- 2014: → Sabiá (loan)
- 2014: Internacional
- 2015–2016: Chapecoense

Senior career*
Years	Team	Apps	(Gls)
2016–2019	Chapecoense	18	(2)
2017	→ Vila Nova (loan)	11	(0)
2018	→ Brasil de Pelotas (loan)	33	(5)
2019–2021	Gil Vicente	65	(9)
2021–2022	Göztepe	30	(2)
2022–2023	Al Bataeh	26	(13)
2023–	Khor Fakkan	33	(13)
- * Club domestic league appearances and goals as of 26 December 2023

Lourency do Nascimento Rodrigues (born 2 January 1996), simply known as Lourency, is a Brazilian professional footballer who plays as a right winger for Emirati club Khor Fakkan.

== Career ==
Born in Imperatriz, Maranhão, Lourency started his career at JV Lideral's youth setup in 2008, aged 12. After a short loan stint at Sabiá, he joined Internacional in 2014.

Lourency moved to Chapecoense in 2015, after being rarely used at Inter. Initially assigned to the under-20s, he made his first team debut on 30 January 2016, coming on as a late substitute for Ananias in a 2–1 Campeonato Catarinense home win against Internacional de Lages.

Lourency made his Série A debut on 15 May 2016, again replacing Ananias in a 0–0 away draw against former club Internacional. On 16 September, he scored his first professional goal, netting the winner in a 2–1 success at Fluminense.

Lourency was not on board the ill-fated LaMia Airlines Flight 2933 that crashed on 28 November 2016, and killed 19 of his teammates, due to a request from Chapecoense's under-20 manager.

== Career statistics ==
As of 9 February 2017

Appearances and goals by club, season and competition
Club	Season	League			State League		Cup		Continental		Other		Total	
Club	Season	Division	Apps	Goals	Apps	Goals	Apps	Goals	Apps	Goals	Apps	Goals	Apps	Goals
Chapecoense	2016	Série A	8	1	3	0	1	0	2 (Note: Appearance(s) in Copa Sudamericana)	0	—		14	1
Chapecoense	2017	Série A	9	1	1	0	0	0	2	0	2 (Note: Appearance(s) in Primeira Liga)	0	14	1
Chapecoense	Total		17	2	4	0	1	0	4	0	2	0	28	2
Vila Nova (loan)	2017	Série B	11	0	0	0	—		—		—		11	0
Brasil de Pelotas (loan)	2018	Série B	0	0	0	0	—		—		—		0	0
Career total			28	2	4	0	1	0	4	0	2	0	39	2

== Honours ==
Chapecoense

- Campeonato Catarinense: 2016, 2017
- Copa Sudamericana: 2016
