= Torneio Nunes Freire =

1976 Torneio Nunes Freire
Torneio Governador Nunes Freire

Tournament details
- Country: Brazil (São Luís, Maranhão)
- Dates: 18 nov - 12 dec
- Teams: 6

Final positions
- Champions: São Paulo
- Runners-up: América Mineiro

Tournament statistics
- Matches played: 15
- Goals scored: 24 (1.6 per match)

The Torneio Nunes Freire (English: Nunes Freire Tournament), was an official tournament organized by CBD featuring the three main Maranhão clubs (Sampaio Corrêa, Moto Clube and Ferroviário), and three invited clubs América Mineiro, Santos, and São Paulo. All the matches was played at the Estádio Nhozinho Santos. Nunes Freire was the governor of the state of Maranhão, and was honored by naming the trophy.

== Format ==
The tournament was played in round-robin, the club that scored the most points at the end of five rounds was declared champion.

== Matches ==
18 Nov

Ferroviário (Maranhão)	1–2	(Minas Gerais) América Mineiro
Odilon 18'	Report	Éder 73'; Natal 87'

Estadio Nhozinho Santos, São Luís
18 Nov

Moto Club (Maranhão)	0–2	(São Paulo (state)) São Paulo
	Report	Terto 35'; Pedro Rocha 60'

Estadio Nhozinho Santos, São Luís
21 Nov

Moto Club (Maranhão)	0–0	(Minas Gerais) América Mineiro
	Report

Estadio Nhozinho Santos, São Luís
21 Nov

Sampaio Corrêa (Maranhão)	1–0	(São Paulo (state)) Santos
Cabecinha 37'	Report

Estadio Nhozinho Santos, São Luís
24 Nov

Sampaio Corrêa (Maranhão)	0–0	(Maranhão) Ferroviário
	Report

Estadio Nhozinho Santos, São Luís
24 Nov

São Paulo (São Paulo (state))	3–1	(Minas Gerais) América Mineiro
Nélson 35', 50'; Mickey 77'	Report	Natal 37'

Estadio Nhozinho Santos, São Luís
28 Nov

Moto Club (Maranhão)	0–0	(São Paulo (state)) Santos
	Report

Estadio Nhozinho Santos, São Luís
28 Nov

Sampaio Corrêa (Maranhão)	0–2	(São Paulo (state)) São Paulo
	Report	Moisés 24' (o.g.); Muricy 51'

Estadio Nhozinho Santos, São Luís
4 Dec

Sampaio Corrêa (Maranhão)	0–1	(Minas Gerais) América Mineiro
	Report	Natal 26'

Estadio Nhozinho Santos, São Luís
4 Dec

Ferroviário (Maranhão)	0–3	(São Paulo (state)) Santos
	Report	Julinho 19'; Tata 60', 61'

Estadio Nhozinho Santos, São Luís
6 Dec

Moto Club (Maranhão)	1–0	(Maranhão) Ferroviário
Goal	Report

Estadio Nhozinho Santos, São Luís
7 Dec

América Mineiro (Minas Gerais)	2–0	(São Paulo (state)) Santos
Goal	Report

Estadio Nhozinho Santos, São Luís
8 Dec

Ferroviário (Maranhão)	0–0	(São Paulo (state)) São Paulo
	Report

Estadio Nhozinho Santos, São Luís
8 Dec

Moto Club (Maranhão)	2–0	(Maranhão) Sampaio Corrêa
Goal	Report

Estadio Nhozinho Santos, São Luís
11 Dec

Santos (São Paulo (state))	2–1	(São Paulo (state)) São Paulo
Bianchini; Julinho	Report	Pedro Rocha

Estadio Nhozinho Santos, São Luís

== Final standings ==
Team	Pts	P	W	D	L	GF	GA	GD
(São Paulo (state)) São Paulo	7	5	3	1	1	8	3	5
(Minas Gerais) América Mineiro	7	5	3	1	1	6	4	2
(Maranhão) Moto Club	6	5	2	2	1	3	2	3
(São Paulo (state)) Santos	5	5	2	1	2	5	4	1
(Maranhão) Sampaio Corrêa	3	5	1	1	3	1	5	-4
(Maranhão) Ferroviário	2	5	0	2	3	1	6	-5

== Champion ==
1976 Torneio Nunes Freire
(São Paulo (state))
São Paulo
1st title
