= João Carlos Ângelo =

Brazilian football manager

Personal information
- Full name: João Carlos Ângelo da Silva
- Date of birth: 24 June 1966 (age 60)
- Place of birth: Rio de Janeiro, Brazil
- Height: 1.99 m (6 ft 6 in)
- Position: Centre back

Team information
- Current team: Madureira (head coach)

Youth career
- Madureira
- 1984–1986: Fluminense

Senior career*
Years	Team	Apps	(Gls)
1986–1988	Pinheiros-PR		
1989–1990	Fluminense	9	(2)
1991	Figueirense		
1992	América de Três Rios		
1992–1995	Louletano	96	(5)
1995–2003	Covilhã	222	(34)

Managerial career
- 2013: São João da Barra (assistant)
- 2014: América-PE
- 2015–2016: Americano
- 2017: Portuguesa-RJ
- 2017: America-RJ
- 2017: Americano
- 2018–2019: Portuguesa-RJ
- 2019: Goytacaz
- 2020: Pinheiro
- 2020: Gonçalense
- 2021–2022: Pinheiro
- 2022–2023: Bahia de Feira
- 2024: Portuguesa-RJ
- 2024–2025: Juazeirense
- 2025–2026: Bahia de Feira
- 2026–: Madureira
- * Club domestic league appearances and goals

João Carlos Ângelo da Silva (born 24 June 1966) is a Brazilian football coach and former player who played as a central defender. He is the current head coach of Madureira.

== Playing career ==
Born in Rio de Janeiro, Ângelo represented Madureira and Fluminense as a youth before being sold to Pinheiros-PR. Back to Fluminense in 1989, he subsequently played for Figueirense and América de Três Rios before moving to Portugal with Segunda Divisão de Honra side Louletano in 1992.

In 1995, Ângelo joined Covilhã, achieving three promotions to the second division before retiring in 2003, aged 37.

== Managerial career ==
After retiring, Ângelo worked as an assistant of Marcelo Cabo at his first club Madureira and joined the youth sides of Fluminense in 2007. He had his first managerial experience in 2014, while in charge of América-PE.

On 16 January 2015, Ângelo was named head coach of Americano. He agreed to become head coach of America-RJ on 8 March 2017, but took over Portuguesa-RJ nine days later.

On 27 July 2017, Ângelo returned to Americano. On 28 November, he returned to Lusa, and qualified the club to the 2019 Série D.

On 4 April 2019, Ângelo was announced as head coach of Goytacaz. He took over Pinheiro on 13 November, before returning to his native state with Gonçalense on 27 October 2020.

Ângelo returned to Pinheiro on 28 December 2020, leading the club to the third place in the 2021 Campeonato Maranhense. On 5 April 2022, he was appointed Bahia de Feira head coach.

On 12 September 2023, after narrowly missing out promotion from the 2023 Série D, Ângelo left Bahia de Feira. On 30 November, he was announced back at Portuguesa-RJ.

== Honours ==
=== Player ===
Covilhã

- Segunda Divisão: 1998–99
