= David (footballer, born 2001) =

Brazilian footballer

Personal information
- Full name: David Thomaz dos Santos Oliveira
- Date of birth: 14 October 2001 (age 25)
- Place of birth: Rosário, Brazil
- Height: 1.91 m (6 ft 3 in)
- Position: Centre-back

Team information
- Current team: Şamaxı
- Number: 44

Senior career*
| Years | Team | Apps | (Gls) |
| 2019 | Viana | 3 | (0) |
| 2019 | Santa Quitéria-MA | 0 | (0) |
| 2020–2022 | Grêmio Anápolis | 7 | (0) |
| 2020–2021 | → Penafiel (loan) | 18 | (1) |
| 2021 | → Braga B (loan) | 4 | (0) |
| 2022 | → Felgueiras 1932 (loan) | 0 | (0) |
| 2022 | Felgueiras 1932 | 0 | (0) |
| 2023 | Grêmio Anápolis | 2 | (0) |
| 2023 | Juventus Jaraguá | 2 | (0) |
| 2023–2024 | Montalegre | 25 | (1) |
| 2024 | Lusitânia Lourosa | 7 | (0) |
| 2024–2025 | Sporting da Covilhã | 28 | (2) |
| 2025– | Şamaxı | 30 | (0) |
- * Club domestic league appearances and goals as of 22 June 2026

David Thomaz dos Santos Oliveira (born 14 October 2001), commonly known as David, is a Brazilian professional footballer who plays as a centre-back for Azerbaijan Premier League club Şamaxı.

== Career statistics ==
As of 13 March 2021

Appearances and goals by club, season and competition
| Club | Season | League | | | State League | | Cup | | Other | | Total | |
| Club | Season | Division | Apps | Goals | Apps | Goals | Apps | Goals | Apps | Goals | Apps | Goals |
|---|---|---|---|---|---|---|---|---|---|---|---|---|
| Viana | 2019 | – | | | 3 (Note: Appearances in the Campeonato Maranhense Segunda Divisão) | 0 | 0 | 0 | 0 | 0 | 3 | 0 |
| Santa Quitéria-MA | 2019 | – | | | 0 | 0 | 0 | 0 | 7 (Note: Appearances in the Copa FMF) | 0 | 7 | 0 |
| Grêmio Anápolis | 2020 | – | | | 7 (Note: Appearances in the Campeonato Goiano) | 0 | 0 | 0 | 0 | 0 | 7 | 0 |
| Grêmio Anápolis | 2021 | – | | | 0 | 0 | 0 | 0 | 0 | 0 | 0 | 0 |
| Grêmio Anápolis | Total | | 0 | 0 | 7 | 0 | 0 | 0 | 0 | 0 | 7 | 0 |
| Penafiel | 2020–21 | Liga Portugal 2 | 17 | 1 | – | | 2 (Note: Appearances in the Taça de Portugal) | 0 | 0 | 0 | 19 | 1 |
| Career total | | | 17 | 1 | 10 | 0 | 2 | 0 | 7 | 0 | 36 | 1 |
