= Sabiá Futebol Clube =

Sabiá
- Full name: Sabiá Futebol Clube
- Founded: April 23, 2007
- Ground: Estádio Duque de Caxias, Caxias, Maranhão state, Brazil
- Capacity: 3,500
Home colors	Away colors

Sabiá Futebol Clube, commonly known as Sabiá, is a Brazilian football club based in Caxias, Maranhão state.

== History ==
The club was founded on January 18, 2011, being named after the true thrush bird, and depicting it in their logo. They finished in the second place in the Campeonato Maranhense Second Division in 2011, losing the title to Viana and thus being promoted to the 2012 Campeonato Maranhense.

== Stadium ==
Sabiá Futebol Clube play their home games at Estádio Duque de Caxias. The stadium has a maximum capacity of 3,500 people.
