= Marcinho Guerreiro =

Marcinho Guerreiro may refer to:

- Marcinho Guerreiro (footballer, born 1978), Brazilian footballer
- Marcinho Guerreiro (footballer, born 1980), Brazilian footballer
