= 1965 Torneio Marinho Rodrigues =

Torneio Marinho Rodrigues Torneio Maranhão-Piauí
- Season: 1965
- Champions: Maranhão (1st title)
- Matches: 32
- Goals: 110 (3.44 per match)
- Top goalscorer: Croinha (Maranhão)

The 1965 Torneio Marinho Rodrigues, or Torneio Maranhão-Piauí, was the 2nd edition of the Torneio Marinho Rodrigues, organized by the football federations of Maranhão and Piauí. It ended up being the tournament's last season, due to disagreements among Piauí clubs regarding the organization.

The tournament was played from February 14 to May 16 by EC Flamengo, Maranhão, Moto Club, Piauí, River and Sampaio Corrêa. It was won by Maranhão after a 1–0 and 4–3 win against Moto Club in the finals, making it the club's first official title outside of state championships.

== Teams ==
Marinho Rodrigues counted with three teams from each state participating, cited below:

Association	Team	Previous wins
(Maranhão) Maranhão; 3 berths	Maranhão	—N/a
(Maranhão) Maranhão; 3 berths	Moto Club	—N/a
(Maranhão) Maranhão; 3 berths	Sampaio Corrêa	1 (1964)
(Piauí) Piauí; 3 berths	Flamengo	—N/a
(Piauí) Piauí; 3 berths	Piauí	—N/a
(Piauí) Piauí; 3 berths	River	—N/a

== League phase ==
Pos	Team	Pld	W	D	L	GF	GA	GD	Pts	Qualification
1	(Maranhão) Moto Club	10	5	3	2	23	15	+8	13	Advance to the Finals
2	Maranhão	10	5	3	2	22	17	+5	13	Advance to the Finals
3	(Piauí) River	10	4	4	2	19	15	+4	12	
4	(Maranhão) Sampaio Corrêa	10	3	4	3	12	9	+3	10	
5	Piauí	10	1	5	4	12	24	−12	7	
6	(Piauí) Flamengo	10	1	3	6	14	22	−8	5	

Source: RSSSF Brasil

== Finals ==
9 May 1965

Moto Club (Maranhão)	0–1	Maranhão
	Jornal do Maranhão; RSSSF Brazil	Neto

?, São Luís, Maranhão

16 May 1965

Maranhão	4–3	(Maranhão) Moto Club
Croinha; Neto	Jornal do Maranhão; RSSSF Brazil	?

?, São Luís, Maranhão
