= Comerciário Futebol Clube =

Brazilian football club

Comerciário
- Full name: Comerciário Futebol Clube
- Founded: December 17, 2003
- Ground: Estádio Nhozinho Santos, São Luís, Maranhão state, Brazil
- Capacity: 12,891
Home colours	Away colours	colours

Comerciário Futebol Clube, commonly known as Comerciário, is a Brazilian football club based in São Luís, Maranhão state.

== History ==
The club was founded on January 8, 2003. Ferroviário won the Campeonato Maranhense Second Level in 2004.

== Honours ==
- Campeonato Maranhense Second Division:
  - Winners (1): 2004

== Stadium ==
Comerciário Futebol Clube play their home games at Estádio Nhozinho Santos. The stadium has a maximum capacity of 16,500 people.
