= Tuntum Esporte Clube =

Brazilian football club

Tuntum
- Full name: Tuntum Esporte Clube
- Founded: 1 June 2021; 3 years ago
- Ground: Estádio Rafael Seabra
- Capacity: 7,000
- President: Francisco Nascimento
- Head Coach: Danilo Brito
- League: Campeonato Maranhense
- 2022: Maranhense 7th of 8 (relegated)
Home colours	Away colours

Tuntum Esporte Clube, known as Tuntum, is a Brazilian football club based in Tuntum, Maranhão state. Founded in 2021, the club plays in the Campeonato Maranhense.

== History ==
Founded on 1 June 2021, the club won a spot in the year's Campeonato Maranhense Segunda Divisão after Babaçu ceased their activities and allowed the new club to use their CNPJ. During their first competition, the club achieved promotion to the Campeonato Maranhense, reaching the finals but losing the title to Cordino.

Tuntum won the title of the 2021 Copa Federação Maranhense de Futebol after defeating Juventude Samas in the finals, and opted to play in the 2022 Copa do Brasil.

== Honours ==
- Copa FMF
  - Winners (2): 2021, 2022
- Campeonato Maranhense Second Division
  - Winners (1): 2023
