= JV Lideral Futebol Clube =

JV Lideral
- Full name: JV Lideral Futebol Clube
- Nickname(s): Trator do Camaçari
- Founded: April 30, 1994
- Ground: Walter Lira, Imperatriz, Maranhão, Brazil
- Capacity: 1,200
- President: Walter Lira
- Head coach: Sandow Feques
- League: Campeonato Brasileiro Série D
- 2010: Campeonato Brasileiro Série D, eliminated in first stage
Home colours	Away colours

JV Lideral Futebol Clube, also known as JV Lideral, are a Brazilian football team from Imperatriz, Maranhão, Brazil. They competed in the Copa do Brasil once, and won the Campeonato Maranhense once.

== History ==
JV Lideral Futebol Clube were founded on May 12, 2005. They won the 2009 Campeonato Maranhense, after beating Sampaio Corrêa in the final. JV Liveral's Romarinho, with 14 goals, was the league's top goalscorer. JV Lideral competed in the 2010 Copa do Brasil, and were eliminated in the first stage by Ponte Preta.

== Stadium ==
JV Lideral play their home games at Estádio Walter Lira. The stadium has a maximum capacity of 1,200 people.

== Current squad (selected) ==
Note: Flags indicate national team as defined under FIFA eligibility rules; some limited exceptions apply. Players may hold more than one non-FIFA nationality.

No.	Pos.	Nation	Player
—	FW	(Brazil) BRA	Jhon ()

== Honours ==
=== State ===
- Campeonato Maranhense
  - Winners (1): 2009

=== Women's Football ===
- Campeonato Maranhense de Futebol Feminino
  - Winners (1): 2015
