= Pinheiro Atlético Clube =

Brazilian football club

Pinheiro
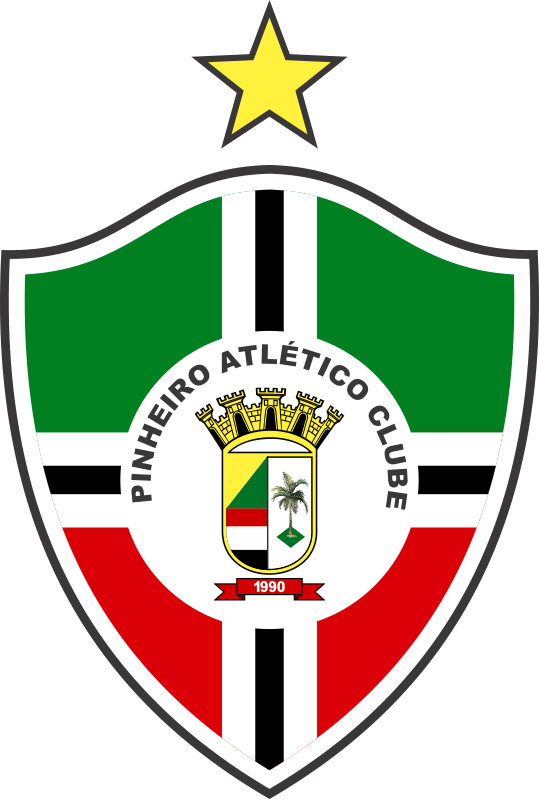
- Full name: Pinheiro Atlético Clube
- Nickname: Búfalo da Baixada
- Founded: 1 April 1989; 36 years ago
- Ground: Estádio Municipal Costa Rodrigues
- Capacity: 5,000
- President: Filemon Guterres
- Head coach: João Carlos Ângelo
- League: Campeonato Maranhense
- 2024: Maranhense, 5th of 8
Home colours	Away colours	Third colours

Pinheiro Atlético Clube, simply known as Pinheiro, is a Brazilian football club based in Pinheiro, Maranhão state. Founded in 1989, they currently play in the Campeonato Maranhense.

== History ==
Founded on 1 April 1989, Pinheiro played in the 1990, 1991, 1992 and 1993 editions of Campeonato Maranhense before going into inactivity. The club returned to an active status only in 2016, playing in the Maranhense Segunda Divisão, where they lost the title and the promotion to Americano.

After finishing in the last position in the 2017 second division, Pinheiro won promotion as champions in 2018, finishing the tournament undefeated. The club remained in the first division in the following years, after finishing fifth and six in 2019 and 2020, respectively.

In the 2021 edition of the Maranhense, Pinheiro reached the semifinals and were knocked out on penalties by eventual champions Sampaio Corrêa, finishing third in the competition.

== Honours ==
- Campeonato Maranhense Second Division
  - Winners (1): 2018
