= Bacabal Esporte Clube =

Bacabal
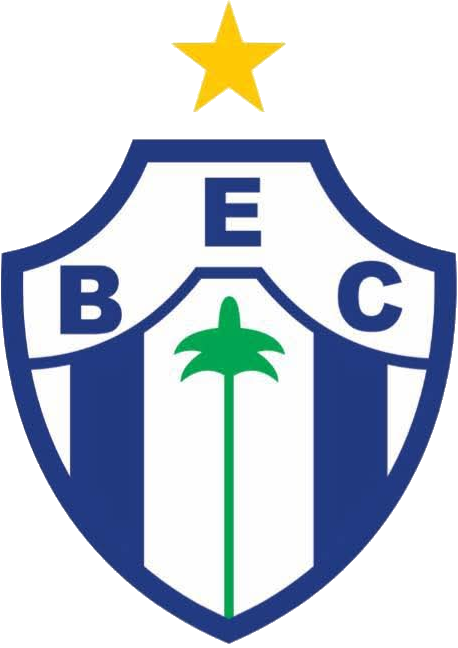
- Full name: Bacabal Esporte Clube
- Nickname: Leão do Mearim
- Founded: May 14, 1974 (51 years ago)
- Ground: Correão, Bacabal, Brazil
- Capacity: 12,000
- President: Manuel Lima da Silva
Home colors	Away colors

Bacabal Esporte Clube, also known as Bacabal, are a Brazilian football team from Bacabal, Maranhão. They competed in the Série C in 1995 and in 2008.

== History ==
Bacabal Esporte Clube were founded on March 12, 1974. They won the Campeonato Maranhense in 1996, after beating Sampaio Corrêa and Caxiense in the final stage. Bacabal competed in the Série C in 1995, and in 2008, being eliminated in the first stage in both seasons.

== Stadium ==
Bacabal play their home games at Estádio José Luís Correa (Correão). The stadium has a maximum capacity of 12,000 people.

== Honours ==
- Campeonato Maranhense
  - Winners (1): 1996
  - Runners-up (1): 1977
- Copa FMF
  - Winners (2): 1991, 2008
- Campeonato Maranhense Second Division
  - Winners (1): 2017
