= Castelão (Maranhão) =

Stadium in São Luís, Maranhão, Brazil

Coordinates: 2°32′55″S 44°15′35″W

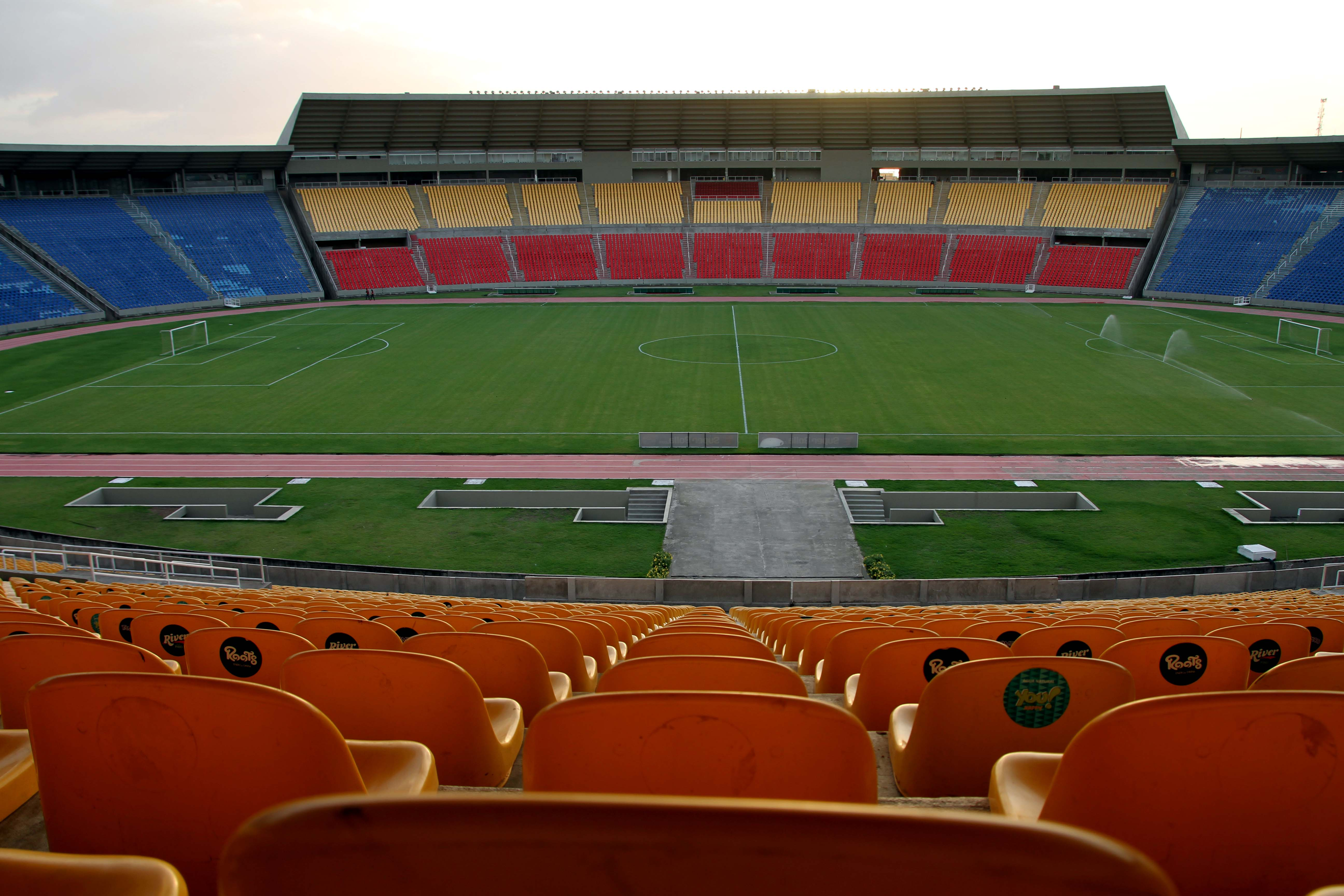
- Sisbrace
- Interactive map of Castelão
- Full name: Estádio Governador João Castelo
- Location: São Luís, MA, Brazil
- Owner: Maranhão State Government
- Capacity: 40,149
- Surface: Grass
- Record attendance: 98,720 (Sampaio Corrêa vs. Santos, 24 September 1998)
- Field size: 105 × 68 m

Construction
- Built: 1982
- Opened: February 5, 1982
- Renovated: 2011–2012, 2024–present

Tenants
- Maranhão (1982–present); Moto Club (1982–present); Sampaio Corrêa (1982–present)

The Estádio Governador João Castelo, also known as the Castelão, is a multi-purpose stadium inaugurated on March 9, 1975, in São Luís, Maranhão, Brazil, with a maximum capacity of 40,149 people in a three-tier configuration. The stadium is owned by the Maranhão state Government, and is the home ground of Sampaio Corrêa Futebol Clube, Moto Club and Maranhão. Its formal name honors João Castelo Ribeiro Gonçalves (1937–2016), Maranhão governor from 1979 to 1982.

== History ==
Castelão was completed in 1982 and was inaugurated on February 5 of that year, when the Brazil national team beat the Portugal national team 3–1. The first goal of the stadium was scored by Brazil's Júnior.

The stadium's attendance record currently stands at 98,720, set on September 24. 1998, when Santos beat Sampaio Corrêa 5–1 in the Copa CONMEBOL.
