= Estádio Nhozinho Santos =

Multi-use stadium in São Luís, Brazil

Estádio Municipal Nhozinho Santos
- Interactive map of Estádio Municipal Nhozinho Santos
- Full name: Estádio Municipal Nhozinho Santos
- Location: São Luís, Maranhão, Brazil
- Coordinates: 2.536286°S 44.289145°W
- Owner: São Luís city hall
- Operator: São Luís city hall
- Capacity: 12,891
- Surface: Grass

Construction
- Built: 1950
- Opened: October 1, 1950

Tenants
- Boa Vontade; Comerciário; Ferroviário; IAPE; Maranhão; Moto Club; Sampaio Corrêa; São José

Estádio Nhozinho Santos is a multi-use stadium located in São Luís, Brazil. It is used mostly for football matches and hosts the home matches of Moto Club de São Luís. The stadium has a maximum capacity of 12,891 people and was built in 1950. It is owned by the São Luís city hall and is named after Joaquim Moreira Alves dos Santos, nicknamed Nhozinho, who introduced football in Maranhão state.

== History ==
It was built in 1950 and inaugurated on October 1 of that year. The inaugural match was played on that day when Sampaio Corrêa beat Paysandu 2-1. The first goal of the stadium was scored by Paysandu's Hélio.

The stadium's attendance record currently stands at 24,865, set on March 26, 1980, when Maranhão and Vasco da Gama drew 0-0.
