= Cordino Esporte Clube =

Brazilian football club

Cordino
- Full name: Cordino Esporte Clube
- Nicknames: Onça de Barra do Corda; Time valente Heróis de Barra do Corda
- Founded: March 8, 2010 (16 years ago)
- Ground: Leandrão, Barra do Corda, Maranhão state, Brazil
- Capacity: 1,400
- President: Bruno César
- Head coach: Marlon Cutrim
- League: Campeonato Maranhense Segunda Divisão
- 2025: Maranhense Segunda Divisão, 5th of 11
Home colors	Away colors

Cordino Esporte Clube, commonly known as Cordino, is a Brazilian football club based in Barra do Corda, Maranhão state. The club competed in the Campeonato Brasileiro Série D once.

Cordino is currently ranked sixth among Maranhão teams in CBF's national club ranking, at 181st place overall.

== History ==
The club was founded on March 8, 2010. The club gained promotion in 2010 to compete in the 2011 Campeonato Maranhense. Cordino debuted in the 2017 Campeonato Brasileiro Série D defeating Santos (AP) 1–0 on May 21, 2017, at Leandrão Stadium.

== Honours ==
- Campeonato Maranhense
  - Runners-up (2): 2017, 2022

== Stadium ==
Cordino Esporte Clube play their home games at Estádio Municipal Leandro Cláudio da Silva, nicknamed Leandrão. The stadium has a maximum capacity of 1,400 people.
