= Ferroviário Esporte Clube =

Association football club in São Luís, Maranhão, Brazil

Ferroviário
- Full name: Ferroviário Esporte Clube
- Nickname(s): Ferrim
- Founded: September 10, 1941 (84 years ago)
- Ground: Estádio Nhozinho Santos, São Luís, Maranhão state, Brazil
- Capacity: 12,891
Home colours	Away colours

Ferroviário Esporte Clube, commonly known as Ferroviário, is a Brazilian football club based in São Luís, Maranhão state.

== History ==
The club was founded on September 10, 1941. Ferroviário won the Campeonato Maranhense in 1957, 1958, 1971, and in 1973.

== Honours ==
- Campeonato Maranhense
  - Winners (4): 1957, 1958, 1971, 1973
  - Runners-up (5): 1967, 1969, 1972, 1975, 1976
- Copa FMF
  - Winners (1): 1974

== Stadium ==
Ferroviário Esporte Clube play their home games at Estádio Nhozinho Santos. The stadium has a maximum capacity of 16,500 people.
