= Santa Quitéria do Maranhão =

Coordinates: 3°31′S 42°32′W

- Municipality
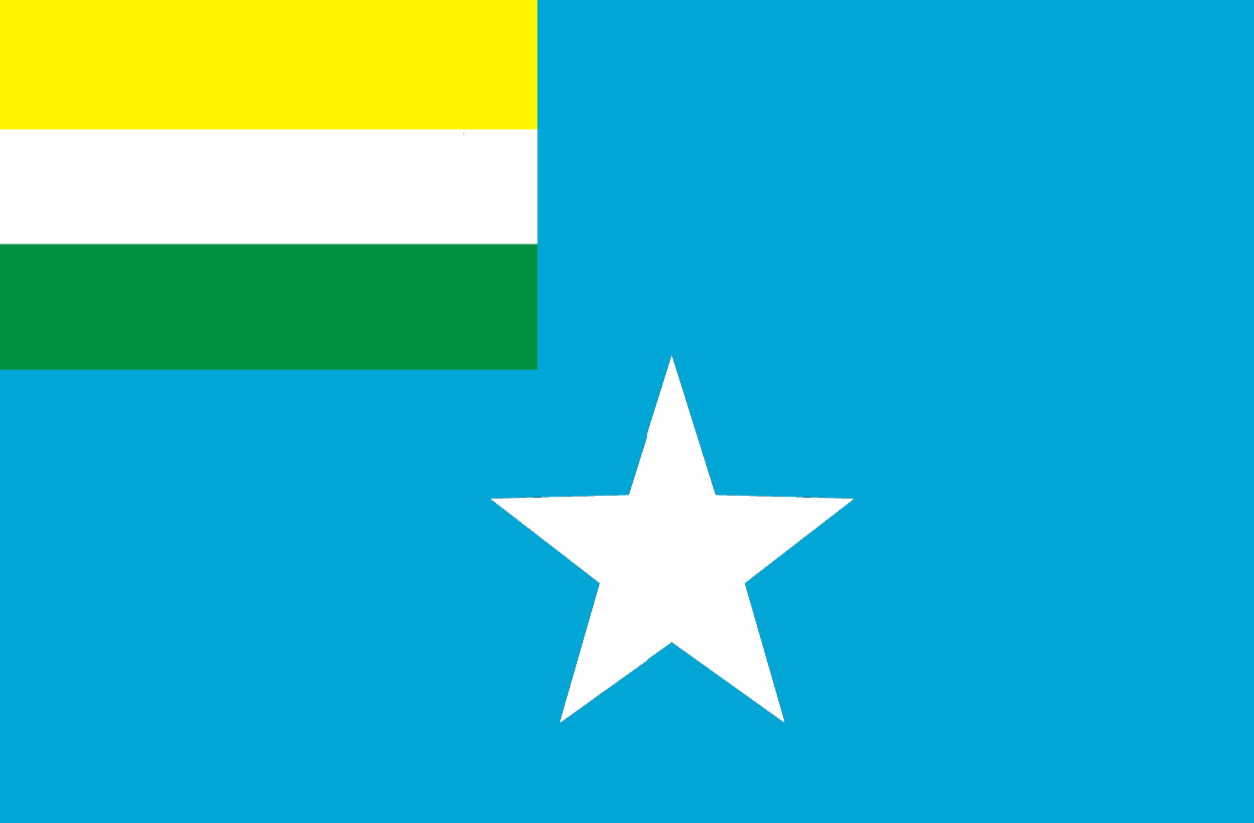
- Flag
- Interactive map of Santa Quitéria do Maranhão
- Country: Brazil
- Region: Nordeste
- State: Maranhão
- Mesoregion: Leste Maranhense

Population (2020)
  - Total: 25,764
- Time zone: UTC−3 (BRT)

Santa Quitéria do Maranhão is a municipality in the state of Maranhão in the Northeast region of Brazil.

The municipality contains part of the 1,535,310-hectare (3,793,800-acre) Upaon-Açu/Miritiba/Alto Preguiças Environmental Protection Area, created in 1992.

== See also ==
- List of municipalities in Maranhão
