= Luminense Atlético Clube =

Luminense
- Full name: Luminense Atlético Clube
- Founded: April 16, 2003 (22 years ago)
- Ground: Arena Charles Müller, Paço do Lumiar, Maranhão state, Brazil
- Capacity: 500
Home colors	Away colors

Luminense Atlético Clube, commonly known as Luminense, is a Brazilian football club based in Paço do Lumiar, Maranhão state. They competed in the Copa do Brasil once.

== History ==
The club was founded as Santa Quitéria Futebol Clube in Santa Quitéria do Maranhão on March 16, 2003. Santa Quitéria won the Campeonato Maranhense Second Level in 2005, and in 2009. Santa Quitéria was runners-up in the 2010 Campeonato Maranhense, losing the competition to Sampaio Corrêa.

They competed in Copa do Brasil in 2012, the club was eliminated in first stage by ASA.

== Honours ==
=== State ===
- Campeonato Maranhense
  - Runners-up (1): 2010
- Campeonato Maranhense Second Division
  - Winners (3): 2005, 2009, 2025

=== Women's Football ===
- Campeonato Maranhense de Futebol Feminino
  - Winners (1): 2018

== Stadium ==
Santa Quitéria Futebol Clube play their home games at Estádio Daniel Rodrigues Leal, nicknamed Rodrigão. The stadium has a maximum capacity of 13,500 people.
