= Americano Futebol Clube (MA) =

Americano
- Full name: Americano Futebol Clube
- Nickname(s): Tubarão do Mearim
- Founded: November 15, 1978 (46 years ago)
- Ground: Correão, Bacabal, Maranhão state, Brazil
- Capacity: 7,856
| Home colours | Away colours |

Americano Futebol Clube, commonly known as Americano, is a Brazilian football club based in Bacabal, Maranhão state.

== History ==
The club was founded on November 15, 1978. Americano competed in the Campeonato Maranhense in 1993, 1996, 1998 to 2000, and in 2005.

== Honours ==
- Campeonato Maranhense Second Division
  - Winners (1): 2016

== Stadium ==
Americano Futebol Clube play their home games at Estádio José Luís Corrêa, nicknamed Correão. The stadium has a maximum capacity of 7,856 people.
