= Caxias, Maranhão =

Caxias
- Municipality
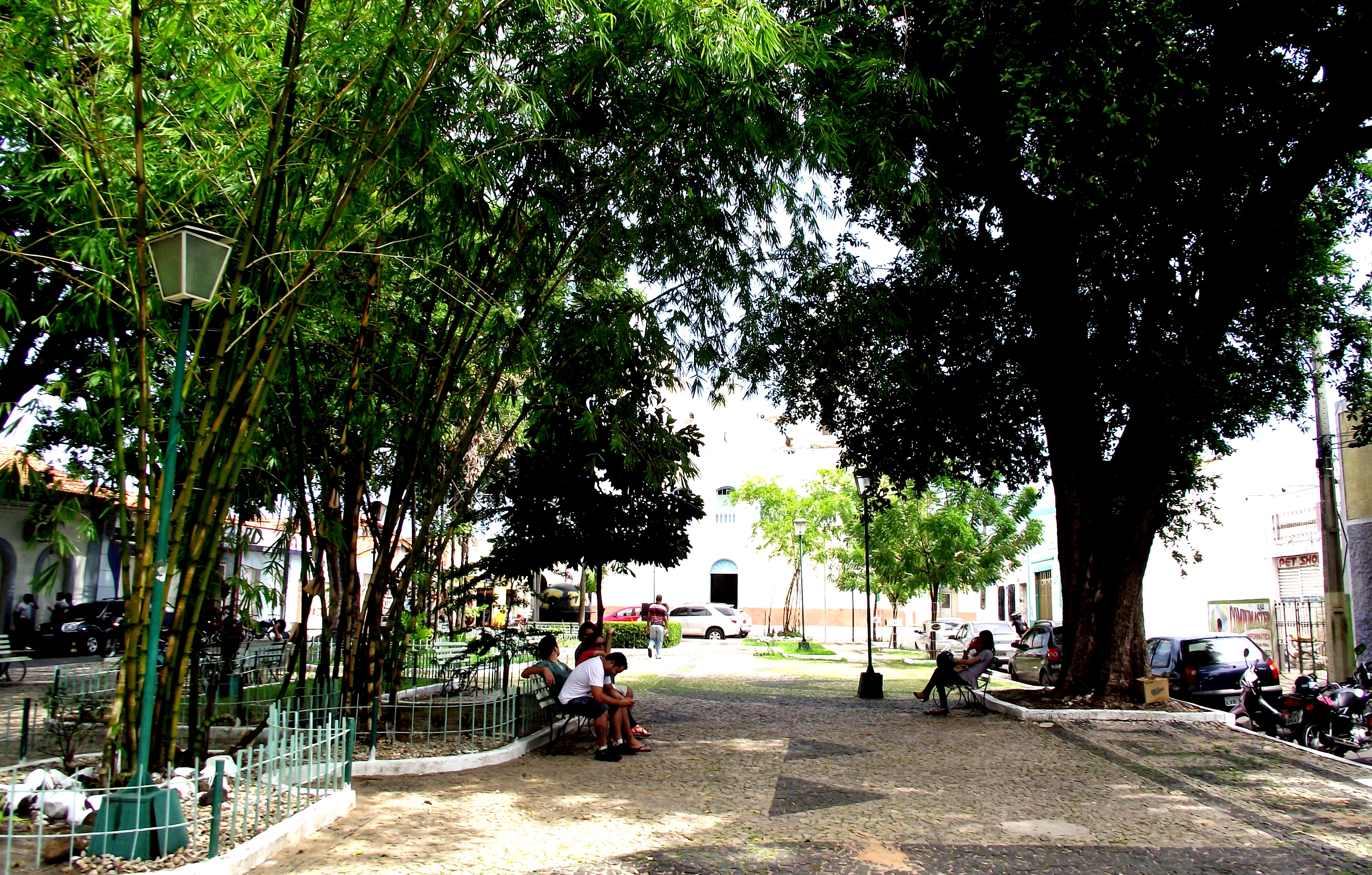

- Flag Coat of arms

- Location of Caxias in the state of Maranhão

- Location in Brazil
- Coordinates: 4°51′32″S 43°21′21″W
- Country: Brazil
- Region: Nordeste
- State: Maranhão
- Mesoregion: Leste Maranhense

Area
  - Total: 2,006.484 sq mi (5,196.769 km^{2})
- Elevation: 217 ft (66 m)

Population (2022 Census)
  - Total: 156,973
  - Estimate (2025): 163,546
  - Density: 78.2329/sq mi (30.2059/km^{2})
- Time zone: UTC−3 (BRT)

Caxias is a municipality in the state of Maranhão in the Northeast region of Brazil.

It is the fifth largest city in the state, with a population of 156,973 inhabitants (2022 Census) and an area of about 5,170 km2.

== Notable people ==
- Francisco das Chagas, serial killer
- Gonçalves Dias, poet, ethnographer, lawyer and linguist.
- Coelho Neto, writer and politician.

== Climate ==
Climate data for Caxias (1981–2010)
Month	Jan	Feb	Mar	Apr	May	Jun	Jul	Aug	Sep	Oct	Nov	Dec	Year
Mean daily maximum °C (°F)	32.8 (91.0)	32.0 (89.6)	31.9 (89.4)	31.8 (89.2)	32.0 (89.6)	32.2 (90.0)	33.1 (91.6)	34.9 (94.8)	36.5 (97.7)	36.9 (98.4)	36.3 (97.3)	34.7 (94.5)	33.8 (92.8)
Daily mean °C (°F)	27.2 (81.0)	26.6 (79.9)	26.3 (79.3)	26.5 (79.7)	26.8 (80.2)	26.5 (79.7)	26.7 (80.1)	27.7 (81.9)	29.1 (84.4)	29.8 (85.6)	29.7 (85.5)	28.6 (83.5)	27.6 (81.7)
Mean daily minimum °C (°F)	23.0 (73.4)	22.8 (73.0)	22.7 (72.9)	22.8 (73.0)	22.6 (72.7)	21.5 (70.7)	21.0 (69.8)	21.3 (70.3)	22.7 (72.9)	23.6 (74.5)	23.9 (75.0)	23.7 (74.7)	22.6 (72.7)
Average precipitation mm (inches)	215.9 (8.50)	242.1 (9.53)	353.0 (13.90)	298.2 (11.74)	143.3 (5.64)	32.2 (1.27)	16.3 (0.64)	14.9 (0.59)	9.5 (0.37)	25.7 (1.01)	39.3 (1.55)	127.5 (5.02)	1,517.9 (59.76)
Average precipitation days (≥ 1.0 mm)	13	14	20	17	11	4	2	1	2	3	3	7	97
Average relative humidity (%)	74.6	78.5	81.7	82.3	77.9	71.5	64.3	57.2	53.4	54.2	56.8	65.1	68.1
Mean monthly sunshine hours	180.0	156.1	170.0	179.9	218.2	249.4	277.0	289.7	278.7	261.2	231.0	199.5	2,690.7
Source: Instituto Nacional de Meteorologia

== See also ==
- List of municipalities in Maranhão
