= Barra do Corda =

- Municipality
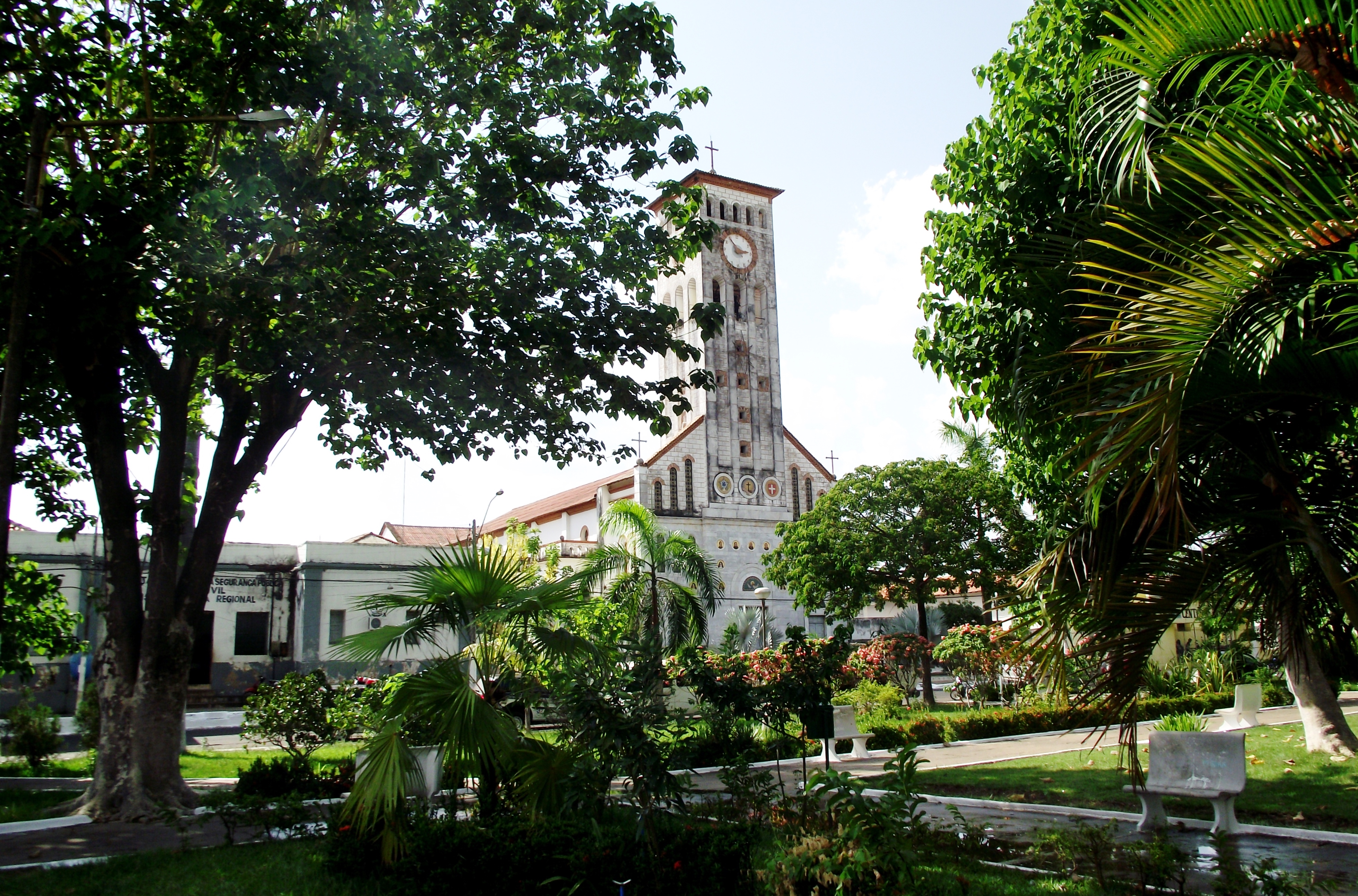
- The Church of Our Lady of Conception

- Flag Coat of arms
- Nickname: Princesa do Sertão
- Location in Brazil
- Coordinates: 5°30′S 45°15′W
- Country: Brazil
- Region: Nordeste
- State: Maranhão
- Mesoregion: Centro Maranhense
- Elevation: 486 ft (148 m)

Population (2020)
  - Total: 88,492
- Time zone: UTC−3 (BRT)

Barra do Corda (European Portuguese: [ˈbaʁɐ du kɔʁdɐ]) is a municipality in the state of Maranhão in the Northeast region of Brazil.

== Geography ==
=== Climate ===
Climate data for Barra do Corda (1991–2020)
Month	Jan	Feb	Mar	Apr	May	Jun	Jul	Aug	Sep	Oct	Nov	Dec	Year
Mean daily maximum °C (°F)	31.7 (89.1)	31.3 (88.3)	31.2 (88.2)	31.7 (89.1)	32.0 (89.6)	32.6 (90.7)	33.6 (92.5)	35.1 (95.2)	35.9 (96.6)	35.7 (96.3)	34.3 (93.7)	33.0 (91.4)	33.2 (91.8)
Daily mean °C (°F)	26.3 (79.3)	26.0 (78.8)	25.9 (78.6)	26.2 (79.2)	26.3 (79.3)	26.0 (78.8)	26.2 (79.2)	27.5 (81.5)	28.7 (83.7)	29.0 (84.2)	28.2 (82.8)	27.3 (81.1)	27.0 (80.6)
Mean daily minimum °C (°F)	22.5 (72.5)	22.2 (72.0)	22.3 (72.1)	22.4 (72.3)	22.0 (71.6)	20.4 (68.7)	19.7 (67.5)	20.6 (69.1)	22.7 (72.9)	23.5 (74.3)	23.5 (74.3)	23.1 (73.6)	22.1 (71.8)
Average precipitation mm (inches)	172.9 (6.81)	193.7 (7.63)	228.2 (8.98)	153.1 (6.03)	74.8 (2.94)	14.1 (0.56)	8.6 (0.34)	7.1 (0.28)	12.9 (0.51)	33.5 (1.32)	79.4 (3.13)	114.0 (4.49)	1,092.3 (43.00)
Average precipitation days (≥ 1.0 mm)	13	13	16	13	7	2	1	1	2	3	5	8	84
Average relative humidity (%)	81.6	83.9	86.0	85.3	81.8	73.5	65.4	57.9	57.3	61.4	68.6	75.2	73.2
Mean monthly sunshine hours	157.2	135.2	152.9	175.4	211.8	257.3	279.9	279.9	231.6	212.8	180.0	163.0	2,437
Source: Instituto Nacional de Meteorologia

== Higher education ==
- Logos Institute of Theology (Instituto Logos de Teologia)

== Notable people ==
- Casagrande, footballer
- Nyeme Costa, volleyball player
- Galeno, footballer

== See also ==
- List of municipalities in Maranhão
