= Esporte Clube Viana =

Viana
- Full name: Esporte Clube Viana
- Nickname(s): Leão da Baixada
- Founded: June 15, 1995
- Ground: Danielzinho, Viana, Maranhão state, Brazil
- Capacity: 3,725
Home colours	Away colours

Esporte Clube Viana, commonly known as Viana, is a Brazilian football club based in Viana, Maranhão state. They competed in the Série C twice.

== History ==
The club was founded on June 15, 1995. They competed in the Série C in 1998, when they reached the Second Stage of the competition. Viana competed again in the Série C in 2003, when they were eliminated in the Second Stage by Imperatriz.

== Honours ==
=== Women's Football ===
- Campeonato Maranhense de Futebol Feminino
  - Winners (6): 2010, 2011, 2012, 2013, 2014, 2016

== Stadium ==
Esporte Clube Viana play their home games at Estádio Daniel Filho, nicknamed Danielzinho. The stadium has a maximum capacity of 3,725 people.
