= Imperatriz =

Coordinates: 5°32′S 47°29′W

Imperatriz, Maranhão
- Municipality
- The Municipality of Imperatriz
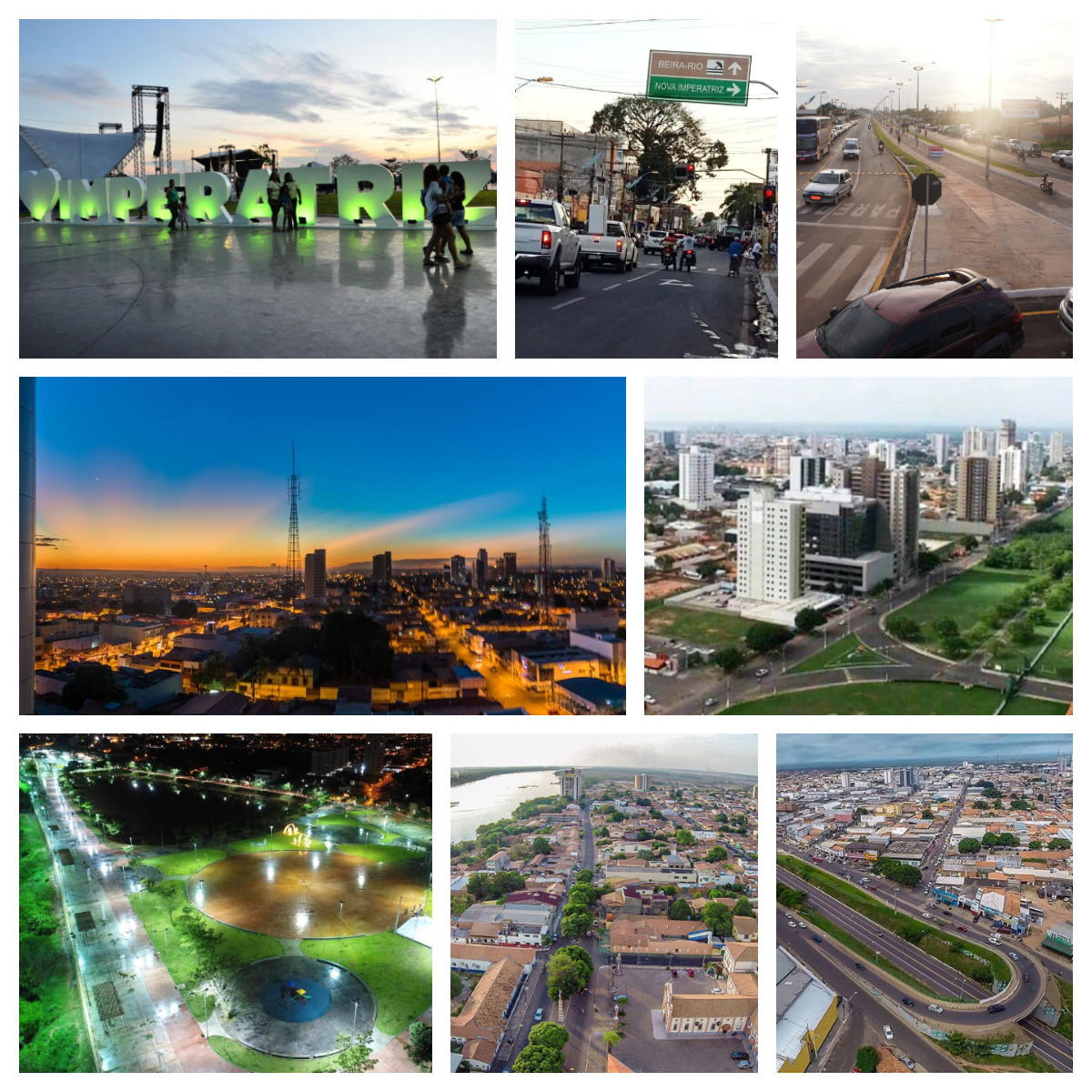

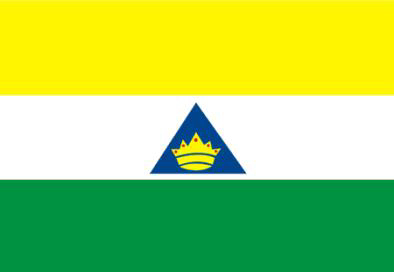
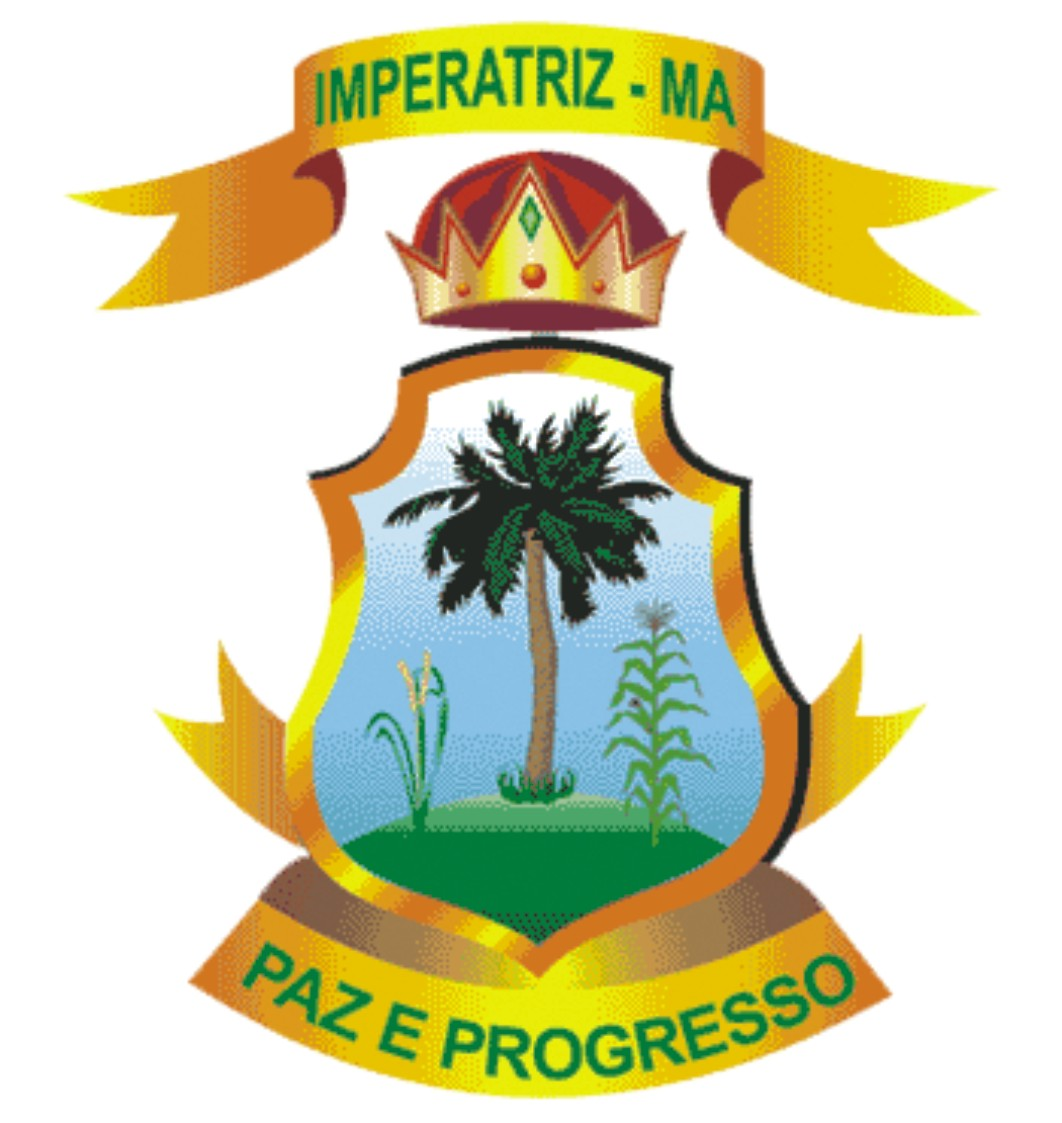
- Flag Coat of arms
- Nickname: Portal da Amazônia (Amazon Portal)
- Motto(s): Paz e Progresso (Peace and Progress)
- Location of Imperatriz in the State of Maranhão

- Country: Brazil
- Region: Northeast
- State: Maranhão
- Founded: July 16, 1856

Government
  - Mayor: Rildo Amaral (PP)

Area
  - Municipality: 1,367.9 km^{2} (528.1 sq mi)
- Elevation: 95 m (312 ft)

Population (2025)
  - Municipality: 273.110
  - Metro: 526,116
- Time zone: UTC-3 (UTC-3)
  - Summer (DST): UTC-2 (UTC-2)
- Postal code: 65900-000
- Area code: +55 99
- HDI (2000): 0.722 – high
- Website: Imperatriz, Maranhão

Imperatriz is a Brazilian municipality, and the second-largest city in the state of Maranhão, after the capital, São Luís. The city extends along the northeastern bank of the Tocantins River and is crossed by the Belém-Brasília Highway, standing on the border with the state of Tocantins.

== Economy ==
Most of the city's active labor is absorbed by the commerce and services. In spite of that, the primary and secondary sectors, specially agribusiness, still play an important role in the local economy. The farming of livestock supplies local slaughterhouses, which in turn allows Imperatriz to export meat to other states in Brazil and abroad. In addition to food processing and agribusiness, construction and non-metallic mineral processing are important. The area's most important crops are soy, rice and cassava. Recently, sugar cane has become important as well. According to IBGE, Imperatriz has a total of 5,657 commercial and 730 industrial enterprises.

The city is served by Prefeito Renato Moreira Airport.

== Demographics ==
- Total Population: 236,691
- Urban Population: 218,555
- Rural Population: 11,895
- Males: 110,739
- Females: 119,711
- Population Density: 150.52 people/km² (389.9 people/mi^{2}
- Population Growth: 0.5% (from 1996-03-01 to 2000-08-01)
- Urbanization Rate: 94.84%

== Geography ==
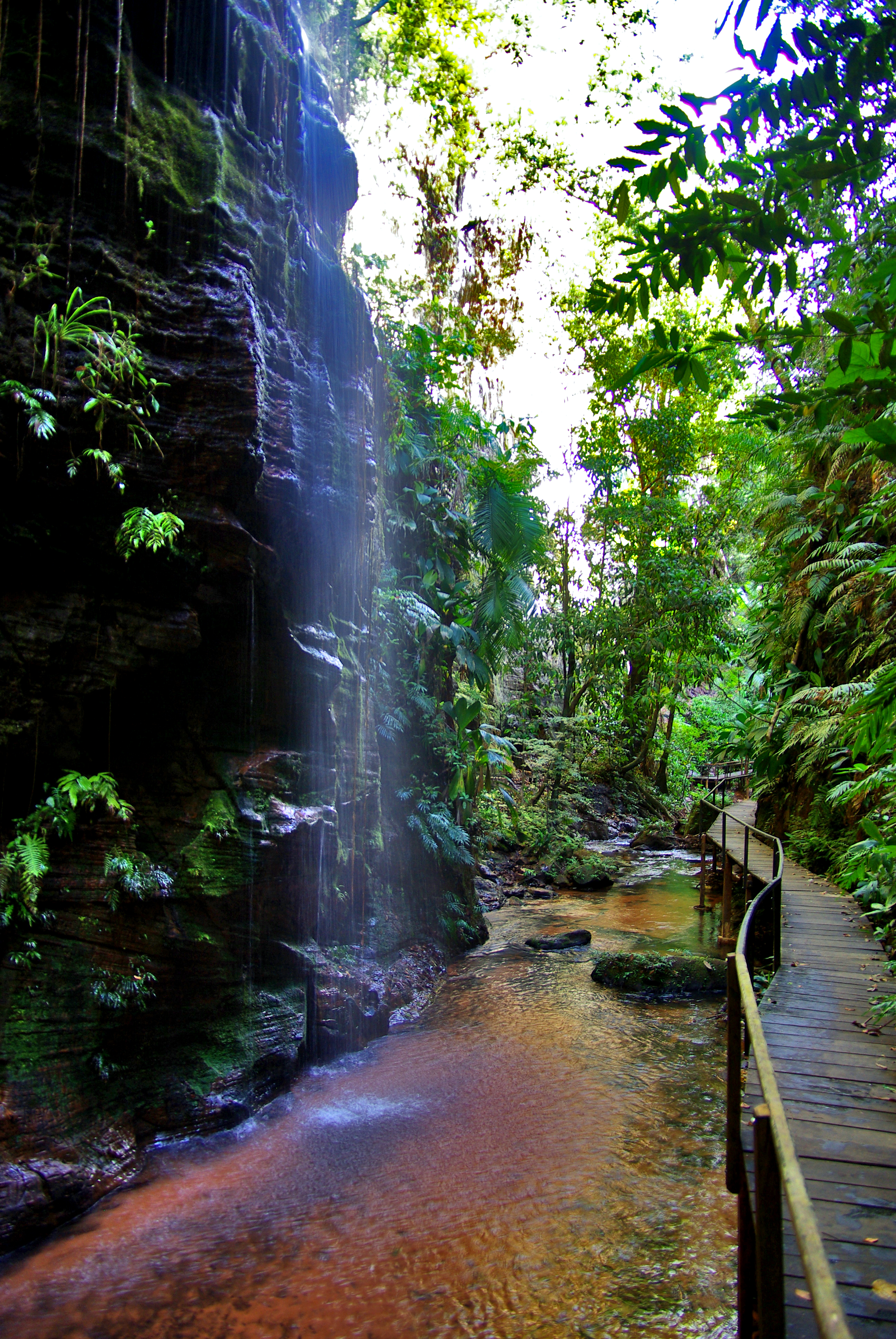
Pedra Caída waterfall and walkway

Western Maranhão forms the boundary between the Amazon rainforest and the vast savanna region, known as the Cerrado. Imperatriz is the place of intersection of many major roads and waterways. The landscape is characterized by gallery forests and stream valleys. Humid fields and palm paths are found where the water table is near the surface.

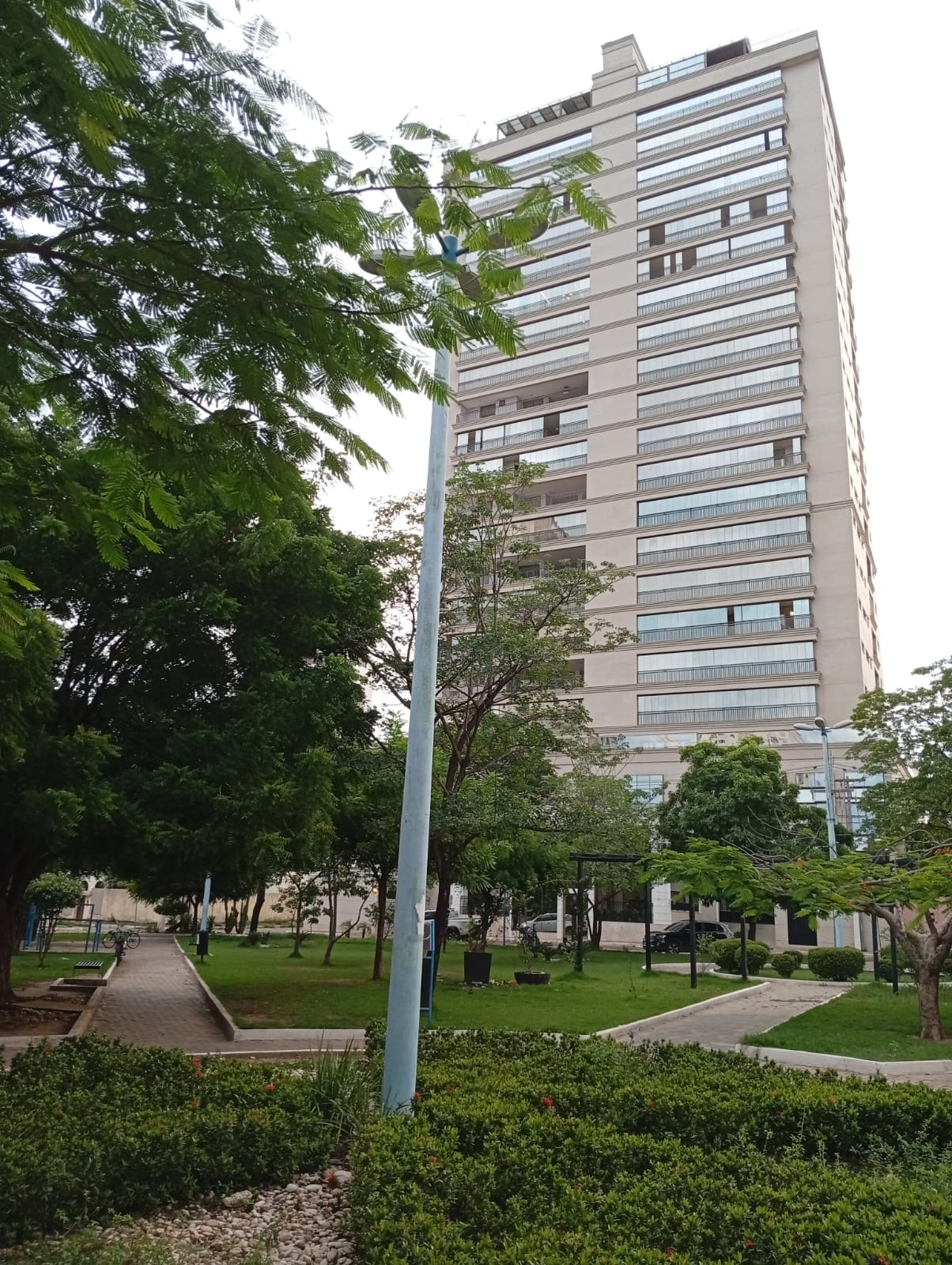
Pedro Américo square, in the Três Poderes neighbourhood

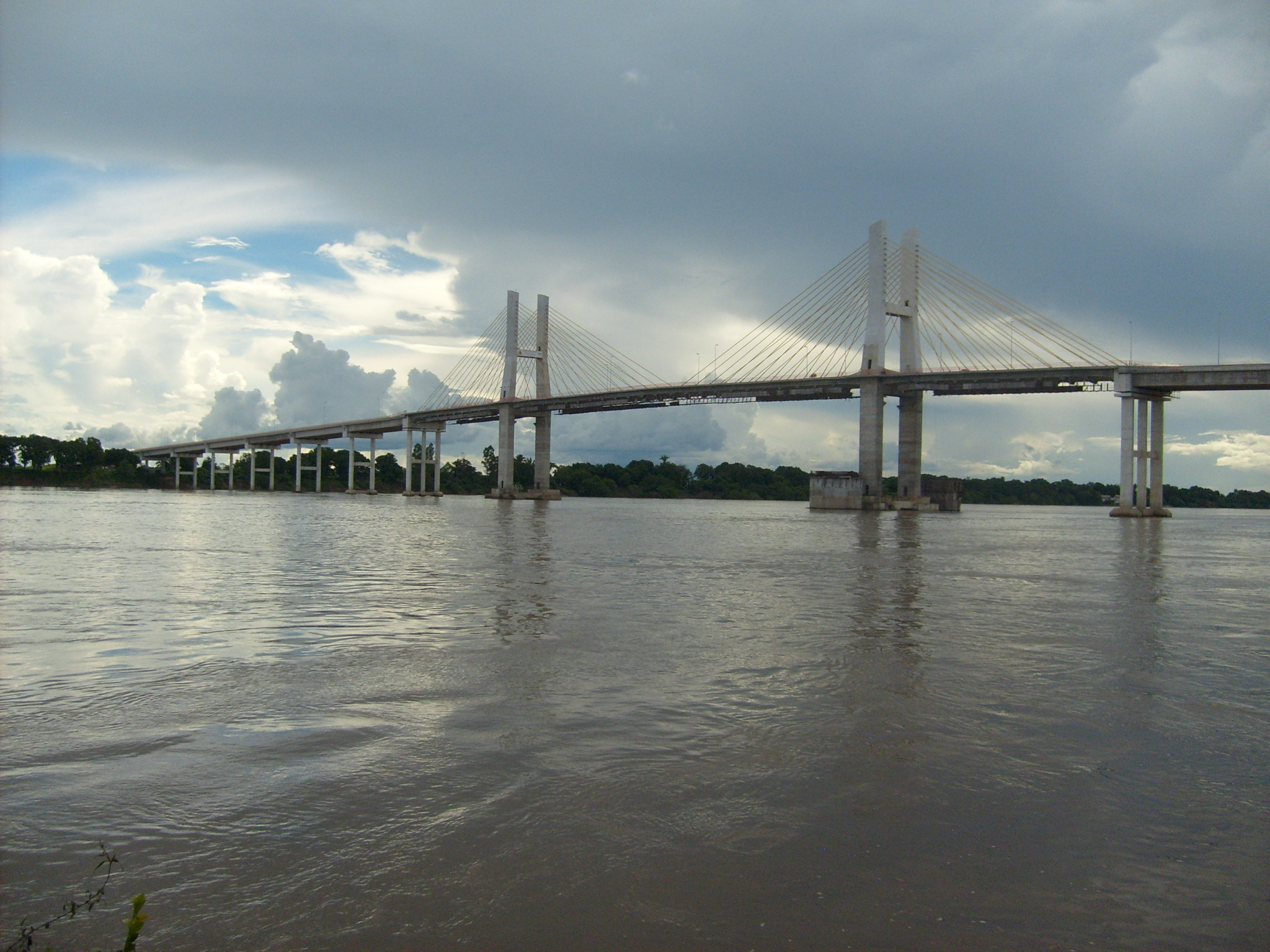
Dom Felipe Gregory Bridge over Tocantins River

== Climate ==
Imperatriz has a tropical savanna climate, with a wet season during spring and summer months (November to April), and a dry one during fall and winter months (May to November). July and August are the hottest and coolest months at once, when temperatures can range from 13 °C (55.4 °F) to over 40 °C (104 °F) within a single day. "Feels like" temperatures are always over 36–42 °C (96.8–107.6 °F). In rare occasions, cold snaps can make temperatures drop to as low as 12 °C (53.6 °F).

Climate data for Imperatriz (1991–2020)
| Month | Jan | Feb | Mar | Apr | May | Jun | Jul | Aug | Sep | Oct | Nov | Dec | Year |
|---|---|---|---|---|---|---|---|---|---|---|---|---|---|
| Mean daily maximum °C (°F) | 31.8 (89.2) | 31.5 (88.7) | 31.5 (88.7) | 32.1 (89.8) | 32.8 (91.0) | 33.7 (92.7) | 34.3 (93.7) | 35.5 (95.9) | 35.6 (96.1) | 34.4 (93.9) | 33.4 (92.1) | 32.4 (90.3) | 33.3 (91.9) |
| Daily mean °C (°F) | 26.6 (79.9) | 26.4 (79.5) | 26.4 (79.5) | 26.8 (80.2) | 27.3 (81.1) | 27.6 (81.7) | 27.7 (81.9) | 28.5 (83.3) | 29.1 (84.4) | 28.5 (83.3) | 27.9 (82.2) | 27.1 (80.8) | 27.5 (81.5) |
| Mean daily minimum °C (°F) | 22.8 (73.0) | 22.8 (73.0) | 22.9 (73.2) | 23.1 (73.6) | 23.1 (73.6) | 22.4 (72.3) | 21.9 (71.4) | 22.3 (72.1) | 23.4 (74.1) | 23.8 (74.8) | 23.7 (74.7) | 23.2 (73.8) | 22.9 (73.2) |
| Average precipitation mm (inches) | 235.6 (9.28) | 266.3 (10.48) | 294.1 (11.58) | 227.1 (8.94) | 104.1 (4.10) | 27.6 (1.09) | 8.1 (0.32) | 13.5 (0.53) | 42.4 (1.67) | 110.8 (4.36) | 143.9 (5.67) | 191.2 (7.53) | 1,656.6 (65.22) |
| Average precipitation days (≥ 1.0 mm) | 16 | 15 | 16 | 14 | 8 | 2 | 1 | 1 | 2 | 5 | 9 | 12 | 101 |
| Average relative humidity (%) | 82.1 | 84.3 | 85.0 | 83.9 | 79.5 | 73.1 | 68.3 | 63.8 | 64.9 | 71.8 | 76.5 | 80.0 | 76.1 |
| Mean monthly sunshine hours | 153.2 | 122.9 | 131.6 | 155.2 | 205.1 | 250.2 | 274.5 | 267.3 | 221.5 | 181.7 | 162.4 | 151.1 | 2,267.3 |
Source: Instituto Nacional de Meteorologia
