= Instituto de Administração de Projetos Educacionais Futebol Clube =

IAPE
- Full name: Instituto de Administração de Projetos Educacionais Futebol Clube
- Nickname: Canário da Ilha
- Founded: 10 August 2008; 18 years ago
- Ground: Estádio Nhozinho Santos, São Luís, Maranhão state, Brazil
- Capacity: 12,891
- League: Campeonato Brasileiro Série D Campeonato Maranhense
- 2025: Maranhense, 3rd of 8
| Home colours | Away colours |

Instituto de Administração de Projetos Educacionais Futebol Clube, commonly known as IAPE, is a Brazilian football club based in São Luís, Maranhão state. They competed in the Copa do Brasil once.

== History ==
The club was founded on August 8, 2008. IAPE won the Campeonato Maranhense Second Level in 2008, and the Copa União do Maranhão in 2010. They are facing Atlético Mineiro in the 2011 edition of the Copa do Brasil.

== Honours ==
=== State ===
- Campeonato Maranhense
  - Winners (1): 2026
- Copa FMF
  - Winners (1): 2010
- Campeonato Maranhense Second Division
  - Winners (1): 2008

=== Women's Football ===
- Campeonato Maranhense de Futebol Feminino
  - Winners (2): 2022, 2023

== Stadium ==
Instituto de Administração de Projetos Educacionais Futebol Clube play their home games at Estádio Nhozinho Santos. The stadium has a maximum capacity of 16,500 people.
