= Maranhão Atlético Clube =

Brazilian association football club based in São Luís, Maranhão

Maranhão
- Full name: Maranhão Atlético Clube
- Nicknames: MAC; Demolidor de Cartazes (Demolisher of Posters); Bode Gregório (Goat Gregorio)
- Founded: 24 September 1932; 94 years ago
- Ground: Castelão
- Capacity: 40,149
- President: Carlos Eduardo Dias
- Head coach: Marcinho Guerreiro
- League: Campeonato Brasileiro Série C Campeonato Maranhense
- 2025 2025: Série D, 4th of 64 (promoted); Maranhense, 1st of 8 (champions)
Home colors	Away colors

Maranhão Atlético Clube, commonly referred to as Maranhão, is a Brazilian professional club based in São Luís, Maranhão, founded on 24 September 1932. It competes in the Campeonato Brasileiro Série C, the third tier of Brazilian football, as well as in the Campeonato Maranhense, the top flight of the Maranhão state football league.

== History ==
Maranhão Atlético Clube was founded on 24 September 1932.

In 1937, Maranhão won the Campeonato Maranhense, which was the club's first title.

In 1979, Maranhão competed in the Campeonato Brasileiro Série A for the first time, finishing in the 26th place.

In 1980, Maranhão competed again in the Série A's first division, finishing in the 44th place (the competition's last position). The club was relegated to the second division.

In 2000, the club was the Copa Norte's runner-up. São Raimundo beat the club in the final.

== Honours ==
=== Official tournaments ===
Inter-state
Competitions	Titles	Seasons
Torneio Marinho Rodrigues	1^{s}	1965
State
Competitions	Titles	Seasons
Campeonato Maranhense	16	1937, 1941, 1943, 1951, 1963, 1969, 1970, 1979, 1993, 1994, 1995, 1999, 2007, 2013, 2023, 2025
Copa FMF	12	1967, 1968, 1969, 1970, 1971, 1975, 1979, 1980, 1987, 1989, 2006, 2018
Campeonato Maranhense Second Division	2^{s}	2015, 2022

- record
- ^{s} shared record

=== Others tournaments ===
==== State ====
- Torneio Início (10): 1940, 1944, 1951, 1959, 1961, 1965, 1966, 1967, 1971, 1986

==== Runners-up ====
- Copa Norte (1): 2000
- Campeonato Maranhense (19): 1935, 1938, 1940, 1945, 1949, 1952, 1962, 1974, 1983, 1984, 1986, 1989, 1992, 1998, 2003, 2011, 2012, 2024, 2026
- Copa FMF (5): 2004, 2012, 2013, 2019, 2022

== Stadium ==
The club's home matches are usually played at Castelão stadium, which has a maximum capacity of 70,000 people.

== Current squad ==
=== First team ===
As of 17 September 2026

Note: Flags indicate national team as defined under FIFA eligibility rules; some limited exceptions apply. Players may hold more than one non-FIFA nationality.

No.	Pos.	Nation	Player
1	GK	BRA	Jean
2	DF	BRA	Ball
3	DF	BRA	Edson Fernando
4	DF	BRA	Iran
5	MF	BRA	Railson
6	DF	BRA	Lucas Santos
7	FW	BRA	Felipe Sales (on loan from Maguary)
9	FW	BRA	Erverson
10	MF	BRA	Jorge Rocha
11	FW	BRA	Pimentinha
13	DF	BRA	Lucão
15	DF	BRA	Almeida
16	DF	BRA	André Radija

No.	Pos.	Nation	Player
17	FW	BRA	Kleberson
18	DF	BRA	Rodrigo Negueba
19	FW	BRA	Rafael Texieira
20	MF	BRA	Vagalume
21	MF	BRA	Pedro Lucas
22	MF	BRA	Rodrigo
23	GK	BRA	Cauê
24	FW	BRA	Ronald Makalysten (on loan from IAPE)
25	DF	BRA	Maurício Maranhão
26	MF	BRA	Luis Gustavo (on loan from Novo Hamburgo)
27	MF	BRA	Peu
29	FW	BRA	Felipe Cruz (on loan from Primavera)
—	GK	BRA	Victor Guilherme

== Mascot and nickname ==
The club's mascot is a goat. Maranhão is nicknamed Bode Gregório, Demolidor de Cartazes, and Quadricolor.
