= Bacabal =

- Municipality
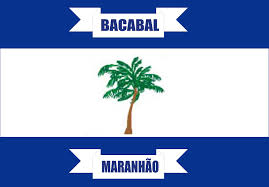
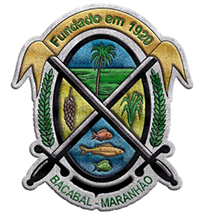
- Flag Coat of arms

- Location in Maranhão state

- Location in Brazil
- Coordinates: 4°13′30″S 44°46′48″W
- Country: Brazil
- Region: Northeast
- State: Maranhão

Population (2022 Census)
  - Total: 103,711
  - Estimate (2025): 107,755
- Time zone: UTC−3 (BRT)

Bacabal is a city in Maranhão, Brazil. It is located approximately 250 km south of the state capital São Luís. The city proper has a population of 103,711 (IBGE 2022 Census). It is the seat of the Roman Catholic Diocese of Bacabal.

The municipality contains a small part of the Baixada Maranhense Environmental Protection Area, a 1,775,035.6-hectare (4,386,208-acre) sustainable use conservation unit created in 1991 that has been a Ramsar Site since 2000.

== Climate ==
Climate data for Bacabal (1981–2010)
Month	Jan	Feb	Mar	Apr	May	Jun	Jul	Aug	Sep	Oct	Nov	Dec	Year
Mean daily maximum °C (°F)	32.7 (90.9)	32.4 (90.3)	32.3 (90.1)	32.3 (90.1)	32.7 (90.9)	32.7 (90.9)	33.1 (91.6)	34.7 (94.5)	36.1 (97.0)	36.2 (97.2)	35.6 (96.1)	34.4 (93.9)	33.8 (92.8)
Daily mean °C (°F)	27.2 (81.0)	26.9 (80.4)	26.8 (80.2)	27.3 (81.1)	27.2 (81.0)	27.1 (80.8)	27.3 (81.1)	28.0 (82.4)	28.9 (84.0)	29.1 (84.4)	28.9 (84.0)	28.3 (82.9)	27.8 (82.0)
Mean daily minimum °C (°F)	22.8 (73.0)	23.2 (73.8)	23.4 (74.1)	23.6 (74.5)	23.8 (74.8)	22.9 (73.2)	22.3 (72.1)	22.6 (72.7)	23.1 (73.6)	23.5 (74.3)	23.8 (74.8)	23.5 (74.3)	23.2 (73.8)
Average precipitation mm (inches)	263.8 (10.39)	263.8 (10.39)	390.4 (15.37)	358.4 (14.11)	195.0 (7.68)	54.6 (2.15)	17.9 (0.70)	14.6 (0.57)	10.6 (0.42)	35.4 (1.39)	67.8 (2.67)	135.3 (5.33)	1,807.6 (71.17)
Average precipitation days (≥ 1.0 mm)	16	16	21	20	13	6	2	1	2	4	5	9	115
Average relative humidity (%)	82.0	83.7	84.8	85.1	80.8	76.9	73.4	68.3	65.5	66.4	68.5	74.8	75.9
Mean monthly sunshine hours	155.4	138.4	140.6	148.6	199.1	241.3	262.1	272.3	241.2	214.5	186.4	176.9	2,376.8
Source: Instituto Nacional de Meteorologia
