= Sociedade Esportiva Juventude =

Juventude Samas
- Full name: Sociedade Esportiva Juventude
- Nickname: Poraquê (Electric eel)
- Founded: 14 June 1979; 46 years ago
- Ground: Estádio Municipal Marcos Pinheiro Neto
- Capacity: 500
- Chairman: Miltinho Aragão
- Head coach: Marlon Cutrim
- 2022 2022: Série D, 32nd of 64; Maranhense, 8th of 8 (relegated)
Home colours	Away colours

Sociedade Esportiva Juventude, usually known as Juventude Samas, Juventude-MA or simply Juventude, is a Brazilian football club from São Mateus do Maranhão, Maranhão.

Juventude Samas is currently ranked fourth among Maranhão teams in CBF's national club ranking, at 103rd place overall.

== History ==
Founded in 1979 in the city of Caxias, Juventude only played amateur competitions until 2005, when it played in the Campeonato Maranhense Second Division. After finishing second, the club achieved promotion and played the 2006 Campeonato Maranhense, but finished in the last position and later went to inactivity.

The club then played the second division again in 2008, before staying ten years without playing and moving to São Mateus do Maranhão. After finishing fourth in 2018, the club won the second division in 2019, and late in the year, also won the Copa FMF, qualifying for the 2020 Campeonato Brasileiro Série D.

== Honours ==
- Copa FMF
  - Winners (1): 2019
- Campeonato Maranhense Second Division
  - Winners (1): 2019
