= São José de Ribamar Esporte Clube =

São José
- Full name: São José de Ribamar Esporte Clube
- Nickname(s): Peixe Pedra; Ribamaquina; Quadricolor da Balneária; Peixe Valente
- Founded: June 14, 2007; 17 years ago
- Ground: Estádio Dário Santos
- Capacity: 12,891
- President: Ernesto Francisco Garcia
- Head coach: Paulinho Kobayashi
Home colours	Away colours	Third colours

São José de Ribamar Esporte Clube, commonly known as São José, is a Brazilian football club based in São José de Ribamar, Maranhão state.

== History ==
The club was founded on June 14, 2007. The club finished as runners-up in the 2007 Campeonato Maranhense Second Level, losing the competition to Itinga, and finished in the third position in the 2008 Taça Cidade de São Luís.

== Stadium ==
São José de Ribamar Esporte Clube play their home games at Estádio Nhozinho Santos, in São Luís. The stadium has a maximum capacity of 16,500 people.
