= Sociedade Imperatriz de Desportos =

Brazilian association football club based in Imperatriz, Maranhão, Brazil

Imperatriz
- Full name: Sociedade Imperatriz de Desportos
- Nickname: Cavalo de Aço (Horse of Steel)
- Founded: 4 January 1962 (64 years ago)
- Ground: Estádio Municipal Frei Epifânio d’Abadia
- Capacity: 12,500
- President: Adauto Carvalho
- Head coach: Luís dos Reis
- League: Campeonato Brasileiro Série D Campeonato Maranhense
- 2025 2025: Série D, 15th of 64; Maranhense, 2nd of 8
- Website: http://www.novocavalodeaco.com/
Home colors	Away colors

Sociedade Imperatriz de Desportos, commonly known as Imperatriz, is a Brazilian football club based in Imperatriz, Maranhão state. They competed in the Série B once, in the Série C five times and in the Copa do Brasil twice.

Imperatriz is the second-best ranked team from Maranhão in CBF's national club ranking, behind Sampaio Corrêa. They are also the best placed team in the state from outside of Greater São Luís, at 69th overall.

== History ==
The club was founded on January 4, 1962 as Sociedade Atlética Imperatriz. The club competed in the 1987 Série B, which was the White Module of the Copa União, being eliminated in the First Stage of the competition. Imperatriz competed in the Série C in 1995, when they were eliminated in the Second Stage of the competition by Intercap. The club was renamed to Sociedade Esportiva Imperatriz on February 2, 2000. and soon after that to Sociedade Impeatriz de Desportos, which is its current name. They competed again in the Série C in 2002, when they were eliminated in the First Stage. The club competed in the Série C in 2003, when they were eliminated in the Fourth Stage by Tuna Luso. Imperatriz were eliminated in the First Stage in the 2005 Série C, but in the same year they won the Campeonato Maranhense. They competed in the Copa do Brasil in 2006, when they were eliminated in the first round by Vitória. The club was eliminated in the Second Stage in the 2007 Série C Imperatriz competed again in the Copa do Brasil in 2008, when they were eliminated in the first round by Sport.

== Honours ==
=== State ===
- Campeonato Maranhense
  - Winners (3): 2005, 2015, 2019
  - Runners-up (6): 1987, 1993, 2007, 2013, 2018, 2025
- Copa FMF
  - Winners (1): 1988

=== City ===
- Campeonato Imperatrizense
  - Winners (3): 1990, 1993, 2017

== Stadium ==
Sociedade Imperatriz de Desporto play their home games at Estádio Frei Epifânio D'Abadia, nicknamed Danielzinho. The stadium has a maximum capacity of 10,000 people.
