= Campeonato Maranhense =

Football league in Maranhão, Brazil

- Organising body: FMF
- Founded: 1918; 108 years ago
- Country: Brazil
- State: Maranhão
- Level on pyramid: 1
- Relegation to: 2nd Division
- Domestic cup: Copa do Brasil
- Current champions: IAPE (1st title) (2026)
- Most championships: Sampaio Corrêa (37 titles)
- Website: FMF Official website

The Campeonato Maranhense is the top-flight professional state football league in the Brazilian state of Maranhão. It is run by the Maranhão Football Federation (FMF).

== List of champions ==
| Season | Champions | Runners-up |
|---|---|---|
| 1918 | Luso Brasileiro (1) | |
| 1919 | Luso Brasileiro (2) | Fênix |
| 1920 | FAC (1) | |
| 1921 | Fênix (1) | Vasco da Gama |
| 1922 | Luso Brasileiro (3) | |
| 1923 | Luso Brasileiro (4) | |
| 1924 | Luso Brasileiro (5) | Fênix |
| 1926 | Luso Brasileiro (6) | Sampaio Corrêa |
| 1927 | Luso Brasileiro (7) | Sampaio Corrêa |
| 1928 | Vasco da Gama (1) | |
| 1929 | Not held | |
| 1930 | Sírio (1) | |
| 1931 | Not finished | |
| 1932 | Tupan (1) | |
| 1933 | Sampaio Corrêa (1) | |
| 1934 | Sampaio Corrêa (2) | |
| 1935 | Tupan (2) | Maranhão |
| 1936 | Not held | |
| 1937 | Maranhão (1) | Tupan |
| 1938 | Tupan (3) | Maranhão |
| 1939 | Not held | |
| 1940 | Sampaio Corrêa (3) | Maranhão |
| 1941 | Maranhão (2) | Moto Club |
| 1942 | Sampaio Corrêa (4) | |
| 1943 | Maranhão (3) | Sampaio Corrêa |
| 1944 | Moto Club (1) | Botafogo |
| 1945 | Moto Club (2) | Maranhão |
| 1946 | Moto Club (3) | Sampaio Corrêa |
| 1947 | Moto Club (4) | Sampaio Corrêa |
| 1948 | Moto Club (5) | Sampaio Corrêa |
| 1949 | Moto Club (6) | Maranhão |
| 1950 | Moto Club (7) | Sampaio Corrêa |
| 1951 | Maranhão (4) | Sampaio Corrêa |
| 1952 | Vitória do Mar (1) | Maranhão |
| 1953 | Sampaio Corrêa (5) | Moto Club |
| 1954 | Sampaio Corrêa (6) | Moto Club |
| 1955 | Moto Club (8) | Sampaio Corrêa |
| 1956 | Sampaio Corrêa (7) | Moto Club |
| 1957 | Ferroviário (1) | Vitória do Mar |
| 1958 | Ferroviário (2) | Sampaio Corrêa |
| 1959 | Moto Club (9) | Vitória do Mar |
| 1960 | Moto Club (10) | Sampaio Corrêa |
| 1961 | Sampaio Corrêa (8) | Moto Club |
| 1962 | Sampaio Corrêa (9) | Maranhão |
| 1963 | Maranhão (5) | Moto Club |
| 1964 | Sampaio Corrêa (10) | Moto Club |
| 1965 | Sampaio Corrêa (11) | Moto Club |
| 1966 | Moto Club (11) | Sampaio Corrêa |
| 1967 | Moto Club (12) | Ferroviário |
| 1968 | Moto Club (13) | Sampaio Corrêa |
| 1969 | Maranhão (6) | Ferroviário |
| 1970 | Maranhão (7) | Sampaio Corrêa |
| 1971 | Ferroviário (3) | Sampaio Corrêa |
| 1972 | Sampaio Corrêa (12) | Ferroviário |
| 1973 | Ferroviário (4) | Moto Club |
| 1974 | Moto Club (14) | Maranhão |
| 1975 | Sampaio Corrêa (13) | Ferroviário |
| 1976 | Sampaio Corrêa (14) | Ferroviário |
| 1977 | Moto Club (15) | Bacabal |
| 1978 | Sampaio Corrêa (15) | Moto Club |
| 1979 | Maranhão (8) | Sampaio Corrêa |
| 1980 | Sampaio Corrêa (16) | Moto Club |
| 1981 | Moto Club (16) | Sampaio Corrêa |
| 1982 | Moto Club (17) | Sampaio Corrêa |
| 1983 | Moto Club (18) | Maranhão |
| 1984 | Sampaio Corrêa (17) | Maranhão |
| 1985 | Sampaio Corrêa (18) | Moto Club |
| 1986 | Sampaio Corrêa (19) | Maranhão |
| 1987 | Sampaio Corrêa (20) | Imperatriz |
| 1988 | Sampaio Corrêa (21) | Moto Club |
| 1989 | Moto Club (19) | Maranhão |
| 1990 | Sampaio Corrêa (22) | Moto Club |
| 1991 | Sampaio Corrêa (23) | Moto Club |
| 1992 | Sampaio Corrêa (24) | Maranhão |
| 1993 | Maranhão (9) | Imperatriz |
| 1994 | Maranhão (10) | Sampaio Corrêa |
| 1995 | Maranhão (11) | Coroatá |
| 1996 | Bacabal (1) | Sampaio Corrêa |
| 1997 | Sampaio Corrêa (25) | Moto Club |
| 1998 | Sampaio Corrêa (26) | Maranhão |
| 1999 | Maranhão (12) | Sampaio Corrêa |
| 2000 | Moto Club (20) | Sampaio Corrêa |
| 2001 | Moto Club (21) | Sampaio Corrêa |
| 2002 | Sampaio Corrêa (27) | Santa Inês |
| 2003 | Sampaio Corrêa (28) | Maranhão |
| 2004 | Moto Club (22) | Sampaio Corrêa |
| 2005 | Imperatriz (1) | Moto Club |
| 2006 | Moto Club (23) | Sampaio Corrêa |
| 2007 | Maranhão (13) | Imperatriz |
| 2008 | Moto Club (24) | Sampaio Corrêa |
| 2009 | JV Lideral (1) | Sampaio Corrêa |
| 2010 | Sampaio Corrêa (29) | Santa Quitéria |
| 2011 | Sampaio Corrêa (30) | Maranhão |
| 2012 | Sampaio Corrêa (31) | Maranhão |
| 2013 | Maranhão (14) | Imperatriz |
| 2014 | Sampaio Corrêa (32) | Moto Club |
| 2015 | Imperatriz (2) | Sampaio Corrêa |
| 2016 | Moto Club (25) | Sampaio Corrêa |
| 2017 | Sampaio Corrêa (33) | Cordino |
| 2018 | Moto Club (26) | Imperatriz |
| 2019 | Imperatriz (3) | Moto Club |
| 2020 | Sampaio Corrêa (34) | Moto Club |
| 2021 | Sampaio Corrêa (35) | Moto Club |
| 2022 | Sampaio Corrêa (36) | Cordino |
| 2023 | Maranhão (15) | Moto Club |
| 2024 | Sampaio Corrêa (37) | Maranhão |
| 2025 | Maranhão (16) | Imperatriz |
| 2026 | IAPE (1) | Maranhão |

=== Titles by team ===
Teams in bold stills active.

| Rank | Club | Winners | Winning years |
|---|---|---|---|
| 1 | **Sampaio Corrêa** | 37 | 1933, 1934, 1940, 1942, 1953, 1954, 1956, 1961, 1962, 1964, 1965, 1972, 1975, 1976, 1978, 1980, 1984, 1985, 1986, 1987, 1988, 1990, 1991, 1992, 1997, 1998, 2002, 2003, 2010, 2011, 2012, 2014, 2017, 2020, 2021, 2022, 2024 |
| 2 | **Moto Club** | 26 | 1944, 1945, 1946, 1947, 1948, 1949, 1950, 1955, 1959, 1960, 1966, 1967, 1968, 1974, 1977, 1981, 1982, 1983, 1989, 2000, 2001, 2004, 2006, 2008, 2016, 2018 |
| 3 | **Maranhão** | 16 | 1937, 1941, 1943, 1951, 1963, 1969, 1970, 1979, 1993, 1994, 1995, 1999, 2007, 2013, 2023, 2025 |
| 4 | Luso Brasileiro | 7 | 1918, 1919, 1922, 1923, 1924, 1925, 1926, 1927 |
| 5 | Ferroviário | 4 | 1957, 1958, 1971, 1973 |
| 6 | **Imperatriz** | 3 | 2005, 2015, 2019 |
| 6 | **Tupan** | 3 | 1932, 1935, 1938 |
| 8 | **Bacabal** | 1 | 1996 |
| 8 | FAC | 1 | 1920 |
| 8 | Fênix | 1 | 1921 |
| 8 | **IAPE** | 1 | 2026 |
| 8 | **JV Lideral** | 1 | 2009 |
| 8 | Sírio | 1 | 1930 |
| 8 | Vasco da Gama | 1 | 1928 |
| 8 | Vitória do Mar | 1 | 1952 |

=== By city ===
| City | Championships | Clubs |
|---|---|---|
| São Luís | 99 | Sampaio Corrêa (37), Moto Club (26), Maranhão (16), Luso Brasileiro (7), Ferroviário (4), Tupan (3), FAC (1), Fênix (1), IAPE (1), Sírio (1), Vasco da Gama (1), Vitória do Mar (1) |
| Imperatriz | 4 | Imperatriz (3), JV Lideral (1) |
| Bacabal | 1 | Bacabal (1) |

== Copa Federação Maranhense de Futebol ==
The Copa Federação Maranhense de Futebol (English: Federação Maranhense de Futebol Cup) is a competition contested in the second semester of the year, by Maranhão state teams, to determine a spot in the following year's Campeonato Brasileiro Série D and Copa do Brasil. The competition was previously called Taça Cidade de São Luís (1967 until 2009), Copa União do Maranhão (2010, 2011 and 2012) and Copa São Luis (2013) before switching to current name in 2018.

=== List of champions ===
- 1967: Maranhão
- 1968: Maranhão
- 1969: Maranhão
- 1970: Maranhão
- 1971: Maranhão
- 1972: Moto Club
- 1973: Sampaio Corrêa
- 1974: Ferroviário
- 1975: Maranhão
- 1976: Sampaio Corrêa
- 1977: Not held
- 1978: Moto Club
- 1979: Maranhão
- 1980: Maranhão
- 1981: Moto Club
- 1982: Moto Club
- 1983: Sampaio Corrêa
- 1984: Sampaio Corrêa
- 1985: Moto Club
- 1986: Not held
- 1987: Maranhão
- 1988: Imperatriz
- 1989: Maranhão
- 1990: Sampaio Corrêa
- 1991: Bacabal
- 1992: Not held
- 1993: Moto Club
- 1994–2001: Not held
- 2002: Sampaio Corrêa
- 2003: Moto Club
- 2004: Moto Club
- 2005: Not held
- 2006: Maranhão
- 2007: Sampaio Corrêa
- 2008: Bacabal
- 2009: Sampaio Corrêa
- 2010: IAPE
- 2011: Sampaio Corrêa
- 2012: Sampaio Corrêa
- 2013: Sampaio Corrêa
- 2014–2017: Not held
- 2018: Maranhão
- 2019: Juventude
- 2020: Cancelled
- 2021: Tuntum
- 2022: Tuntum
- 2023: Cancelled

=== Titles by team ===
- Maranhão 12 titles
- Sampaio Corrêa 11 titles
- Moto Club 8 titles
- Bacabal and Tuntum 2 titles
- Ferroviário, Imperatriz, IAPE and Juventude 1 title
