= Moto Club de São Luís =

Brazilian association football club based in São Luís, Maranhão, Brazil

Moto Club
- Full name: Moto Club de São Luís
- Nicknames: Papão do Norte; Rubro-Negro da Fabril
- Founded: 13 September 1937; 88 years ago
- Ground: Castelão
- Capacity: 40,149
- President: Mário Carneiro
- Head coach: Tuca Guimarães
- League: Campeonato Brasileiro Série D Campeonato Maranhense
- 2025: Maranhense, 5th of 8
- Website: https://motocluboficial.com.br/
| Home colors | Away colors |

Moto Club, commonly referred to as Moto, is a Brazilian professional club based in São Luís, Maranhão founded on 13 September 1937. It competes in the Campeonato Brasileiro Série D, the fourth tier of Brazilian football, as well as in the Campeonato Maranhense, the top flight of the Maranhão state football league.

Moto Club is currently ranked third among Maranhão teams in CBF's national club ranking, at 74th place overall.

== History ==
The Moto Club with the name Ciclo Moto. The objective was to participate in the modalities of motorcycling and cycling, quite practiced at that time. However, it is in football that the Moto Club achieves great notoriety. In 1939 the Santa Isabel Stadium was inaugurated, in homage to the industrial factory César Aboud. With its own stadium, since the Moto Club was the only team in the state to have one, it managed its first titles and in an incredible way, because it was seven consecutive titles, the state ones of 1944 to 1950, remembered until today by its fans of the time, Becoming the only seven-time champion in the state. But in 1972 the stadium is demolished and in its place is erected the building of the Ministry of Finance in São Luís.

Moto Club is one of the largest state champions in Maranhão, with 26 titles won.

== Stadium ==
The club's home matches are usually played at Castelão stadium, which has a maximum capacity of 40,000 people. The club also plays at Estádio Nhozinho Santos, which has a maximum capacity of 21,000 people.

== Rivalries ==
Moto Club biggest rival is Sampaio Corrêa.

== Honours ==
=== Official tournaments ===
State
| Competitions | Titles | Seasons |
|---|---|---|
| Campeonato Maranhense | 26 | 1944, 1945, 1946, 1947, 1948, 1949, 1950, 1955, 1959, 1960, 1966, 1967, 1968, 1974, 1977, 1981, 1982, 1983, 1989, 2000, 2001, 2004, 2006, 2008, 2016, 2018 |
| Copa FMF | 8 | 1972, 1978, 1981, 1982, 1985, 1993, 2003, 2004 |
| Campeonato Maranhense Second Division | 2^{s} | 2010, 2013 |

- record
- ^{s} shared record

=== Others tournaments ===
==== Inter-state ====
- Torneio Campeão dos Campeões do Norte (1): 1948
- Torneio Pará-Maranhão (1): 1972

=== Runners-up ===
- Campeonato Maranhense (22): 1953, 1954, 1956, 1961, 1963, 1964, 1965, 1973, 1978, 1980, 1985, 1988, 1990, 1991, 1997, 2005, 2014, 2019, 2020, 2021, 2023
- Copa FMF (1): 1991
