= 2022 Copa do Brasil finals =

2022 Copa do Brasil Finals
| Corinthians | Flamengo |
| (São Paulo (state)) | (Rio de Janeiro (state)) |
| 1 | 1 |
- Flamengo won 6–5 on penalties

First leg
| Corinthians | Flamengo |
| 0 | 0 |
- Date: 12 October 2022
- Venue: Neo Química Arena, São Paulo
- Man of the Match: Cássio (Corinthians)
- Referee: Bráulio da Silva Machado (Santa Catarina)
- Attendance: 47,031

Second leg
| Flamengo | Corinthians |
| 1 | 1 |
- Date: 19 October 2022
- Venue: Maracanã, Rio de Janeiro
- Man of the Match: Pedro (Flamengo)
- Referee: Wilton Sampaio (Goiás)
- Attendance: 68,097

The 2022 Copa do Brasil Finals were the final two-legged tie that decided the 2022 Copa do Brasil, the 34th season of the Copa do Brasil, Brazil's national cup football tournament organised by the Brazilian Football Confederation.

The finals were contested in a two-legged home-and-away format between Corinthians, from São Paulo, and Flamengo, from Rio de Janeiro. Corinthians and Flamengo reached the Copa do Brasil finals for the seventh and eighth time, respectively.

The finals took place on 12 and 19 October 2022. A draw by CBF was held on 20 September 2022 to determine the home-and-away teams for each leg. The first leg was hosted by Corinthians at Neo Química Arena in São Paulo, while the second leg was hosted by Flamengo at Maracanã in Rio de Janeiro.

Tied 1–1 on aggregate, Flamengo defeated Corinthians 6–5 on penalties to win their fourth title. As champions, Flamengo qualified for the 2023 Copa Libertadores group stage and 2023 Supercopa do Brasil.

== Teams ==
| Team | Previous finals appearances (bold indicates winners) |
|---|---|
| (São Paulo (state)) Corinthians | 6 (**1995**, 2001, **2002**, 2008, **2009**, 2018) |
| (Rio de Janeiro (state)) Flamengo | 7 (**1990**, 1997, 2003, 2004, **2006**, **2013**, 2017) |

=== Road to the final ===
Note: In all scores below, the score of the home team is given first.

| (São Paulo (state)) Corinthians | | | Round | (Rio de Janeiro (state)) Flamengo | | |
|---|---|---|---|---|---|---|
| Opponent | Venue | Score | | Opponent | Venue | Score |
| (Rio de Janeiro (state)) Portuguesa (won 3–1 on aggregate) | Away | 1–1 | Third Round | (Piauí) Altos (won 4–1 on aggregate) | Away | 1–2 |
| (Rio de Janeiro (state)) Portuguesa (won 3–1 on aggregate) | Home | 2–0 | Third Round | (Piauí) Altos (won 4–1 on aggregate) | Home | 2–0 |
| (São Paulo (state)) Santos (won 4–1 on aggregate) | Home | 4–0 | Round of 16 | (Minas Gerais) Atlético Mineiro (won 3–2 on aggregate) | Away | 2–1 |
| (São Paulo (state)) Santos (won 4–1 on aggregate) | Away | 1–0 | Round of 16 | (Minas Gerais) Atlético Mineiro (won 3–2 on aggregate) | Home | 2–0 |
| (Goiás) Atlético Goianiense (won 4–3 on aggregate) | Away | 2–0 | Quarter-finals | (Paraná (state)) Athletico Paranaense (won 1–0 on aggregate) | Home | 0–0 |
| (Goiás) Atlético Goianiense (won 4–3 on aggregate) | Home | 4–1 | Quarter-finals | (Paraná (state)) Athletico Paranaense (won 1–0 on aggregate) | Away | 0–1 |
| (Rio de Janeiro (state)) Fluminense (won 5–2 on aggregate) | Away | 2–2 | Semi-finals | (São Paulo (state)) São Paulo (won 4–1 on aggregate) | Away | 1–3 |
| (Rio de Janeiro (state)) Fluminense (won 5–2 on aggregate) | Home | 3–0 | Semi-finals | (São Paulo (state)) São Paulo (won 4–1 on aggregate) | Home | 1–0 |

== Format ==
In the finals, the teams played a single-elimination tournament with the following rules:

- The finals were played on a home-and-away two-legged basis. The home-and-away teams for both legs were determined by a draw held on 20 September 2022 at the CBF headquarters in Rio de Janeiro, Brazil.
- If tied on aggregate, the away goals rule and extra time would not be used and the penalty shoot-out would be used to determine the winners. (Regulations Article 20).

== Matches ==
Bruno Henrique and Rodrigo Caio (Flamengo) were ruled out of the finals due to injuries. João Gomes (Flamengo), booked in the first leg, was suspended and did not play the second leg.

=== First leg ===
12 October 2022
21:45 UTC−3

| Corinthians (São Paulo (state)) | 0–0 | (Rio de Janeiro (state)) Flamengo |
|---|---|---|
| | Report |

Neo Química Arena, São Paulo
Attendance: 47,031
Referee: Bráulio da Silva Machado (Santa Catarina)

| Corinthians | Flamengo |

| GK | 12 | (Brazil) Cássio (c) |
| RB | 23 | (Brazil) Fagner | (yellow card) 79' |
| CB | 4 | (Brazil) Gil |
| CB | 31 | (Paraguay) Fabián Balbuena |
| LB | 26 | (Brazil) Fábio Santos |
| CM | 33 | (Argentina) Fausto Vera |
| CM | 37 | (Brazil) Du Queiroz | | (substituted off) 76' |
| AM | 8 | (Brazil) Renato Augusto | | (substituted off) 69' |
| RW | 28 | (Brazil) Adson | | (substituted off) 76' |
| LW | 10 | (Brazil) Róger Guedes | | (substituted off) 69' |
| CF | 9 | (Brazil) Yuri Alberto | (yellow card) 56' |
Substitutes:
| GK | 22 | (Brazil) Carlos Miguel |
| DF | 2 | (Portugal) Rafael Ramos |
| DF | 6 | (Brazil) Lucas Piton |
| DF | 30 | (Brazil) Robert Renan |
| DF | 34 | (Brazil) Raul Gustavo |
| MF | 5 | (Brazil) Maycon |
| MF | 11 | (Brazil) Giuliano | | (substituted on) 69' |
| MF | 17 | (Brazil) Ramiro | | (substituted on) 76' |
| MF | 21 | (Brazil) Mateus Vital | | (substituted on) 69' |
| MF | 24 | (Colombia) Víctor Cantillo |
| FW | 19 | (Brazil) Gustavo Silva | | (substituted on) 76' |
| FW | 42 | (Brazil) Giovane |
Manager:
(Portugal) Vítor Pereira

| GK | 20 | (Brazil) Santos |
| RB | 22 | (Brazil) Rodinei |
| CB | 23 | (Brazil) David Luiz |
| CB | 4 | (Brazil) Léo Pereira |
| LB | 16 | (Brazil) Filipe Luís |
| DM | 8 | (Brazil) Thiago Maia |
| RM | 35 | (Brazil) João Gomes | (yellow card) 21' | (substituted off) 64' |
| LM | 7 | (Brazil) Éverton Ribeiro (c) | | (substituted off) 88' |
| AM | 14 | (Uruguay) Giorgian de Arrascaeta | | (substituted off) 84' |
| CF | 9 | (Brazil) Gabriel Barbosa | | (substituted off) 84' |
| CF | 21 | (Brazil) Pedro |
Substitutes:
| GK | 45 | (Brazil) Hugo Souza |
| DF | 6 | (Brazil) Ayrton Lucas |
| DF | 15 | (Brazil) Fabrício Bruno | | (substituted on) 88' |
| DF | 30 | (Brazil) Pablo |
| DF | 34 | (Brazil) Matheuzinho |
| MF | 10 | (Brazil) Diego |
| MF | 29 | (Brazil) Victor Hugo | | (substituted on) 84' |
| MF | 32 | (Chile) Arturo Vidal | | (substituted on) 64' |
| MF | 42 | (Brazil) Matheus França |
| FW | 11 | (Brazil) Everton | | (substituted on) 84' |
| FW | 31 | (Brazil) Marinho |
| FW | 46 | (Brazil) Mateusão |
Manager:
(Brazil) Dorival Júnior

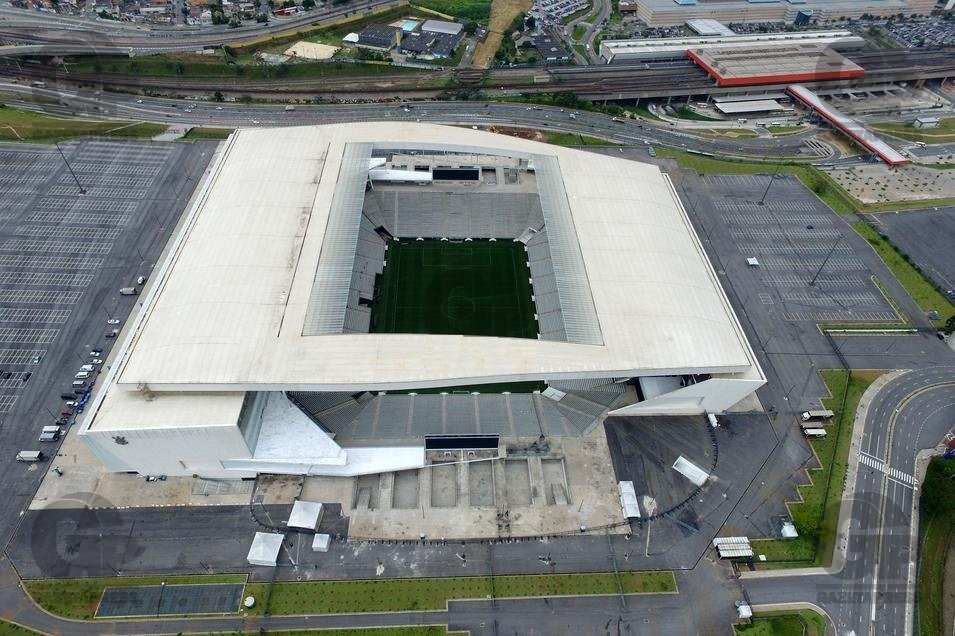
Neo Química Arena in São Paulo hosted the first leg.

Man of the Match:
(Brazil) Cássio (Corinthians)

Assistant referees:
Kléber Lúcio Gil (Santa Catarina)
Guilherme Dias Camilo (Minas Gerais)
Fourth official:
Jean Pierre Gonçalves Lima (Rio Grande do Sul)
Fifth official:
Márcia Bezerra Lopes Caetano (Rondônia)
Video assistant referee:
Rodrigo D'Alonso Ferreira (Santa Catarina)
Assistant video assistant referees:
Helton Nunes (Santa Catarina)
Rafael Traci (Santa Catarina)

=== Second leg ===
19 October 2022
21:45 UTC−3

| Flamengo (Rio de Janeiro (state)) | 1–1 | (São Paulo (state)) Corinthians |
|---|---|---|
| Pedro 7' | Report | Giuliano 82' |
Penalties
| Filipe Luís (penalty missed); David Luiz (penalty scored); Léo Pereira (penalty scored); Éverton Ribeiro (penalty scored); Gabriel Barbosa (penalty scored); Everton (penalty scored); Rodinei (penalty scored) | 6–5 | (penalty scored) Fábio Santos; (penalty scored) Giuliano; (penalty scored) Renato Augusto; (penalty missed) Fagner; (penalty scored) Yuri Alberto; (penalty scored) Maycon; (penalty missed) Mateus Vital |

Maracanã, Rio de Janeiro
Attendance: 68,097
Referee: Wilton Sampaio (Goiás)

| Flamengo | Corinthians |

| GK | 20 | (Brazil) Santos |
| RB | 22 | (Brazil) Rodinei |
| CB | 23 | (Brazil) David Luiz |
| CB | 4 | (Brazil) Léo Pereira | (yellow card) 45+3' |
| LB | 16 | (Brazil) Filipe Luís |
| DM | 8 | (Brazil) Thiago Maia | (yellow card) 42' | (substituted off) 70' |
| RM | 32 | (Chile) Arturo Vidal | | (substituted off) 62' |
| LM | 7 | (Brazil) Éverton Ribeiro (c) |
| AM | 14 | (Uruguay) Giorgian de Arrascaeta | | (substituted off) 77' |
| CF | 9 | (Brazil) Gabriel Barbosa |
| CF | 21 | (Brazil) Pedro | | (substituted off) 77' |
Substitutes:
| GK | 1 | (Brazil) Diego Alves |
| GK | 45 | (Brazil) Hugo Souza |
| DF | 6 | (Brazil) Ayrton Lucas |
| DF | 15 | (Brazil) Fabrício Bruno | | (substituted on) 70' |
| DF | 30 | (Brazil) Pablo |
| DF | 34 | (Brazil) Matheuzinho | | (substituted on) 62' |
| MF | 10 | (Brazil) Diego |
| MF | 29 | (Brazil) Victor Hugo | | (substituted on) 77' |
| MF | 42 | (Brazil) Matheus França |
| FW | 11 | (Brazil) Everton | | (substituted on) 77' |
| FW | 31 | (Brazil) Marinho |
| FW | 46 | (Brazil) Mateusão |
Manager:
(Brazil) Dorival Júnior

| GK | 12 | (Brazil) Cássio (c) |
| CB | 4 | (Brazil) Gil |
| CB | 31 | (Paraguay) Fabián Balbuena |
| CB | 26 | (Brazil) Fábio Santos |
| RM | 23 | (Brazil) Fagner |
| CM | 33 | (Argentina) Fausto Vera | (yellow card) 40' | (substituted off) 77' |
| CM | 37 | (Brazil) Du Queiroz | | (substituted off) 66' |
| LM | 6 | (Brazil) Lucas Piton | (yellow card) 45+4' | (substituted off) 46' |
| AM | 8 | (Brazil) Renato Augusto |
| CF | 10 | (Brazil) Róger Guedes | | (substituted off) 77' |
| CF | 9 | (Brazil) Yuri Alberto |
Substitutes:
| GK | 22 | (Brazil) Carlos Miguel |
| DF | 2 | (Portugal) Rafael Ramos |
| DF | 30 | (Brazil) Robert Renan |
| DF | 34 | (Brazil) Raul Gustavo |
| MF | 5 | (Brazil) Maycon | | (substituted on) 77' |
| MF | 11 | (Brazil) Giuliano | | (substituted on) 66' |
| MF | 17 | (Brazil) Ramiro |
| MF | 21 | (Brazil) Mateus Vital | | (substituted on) 77' |
| MF | 28 | (Brazil) Adson | | (substituted on) 46' | (substituted off) 90' |
| MF | 29 | (Brazil) Roni |
| FW | 19 | (Brazil) Gustavo Silva | | | (substituted on) 90' |
| FW | 42 | (Brazil) Giovane |
Manager:
(Portugal) Vítor Pereira

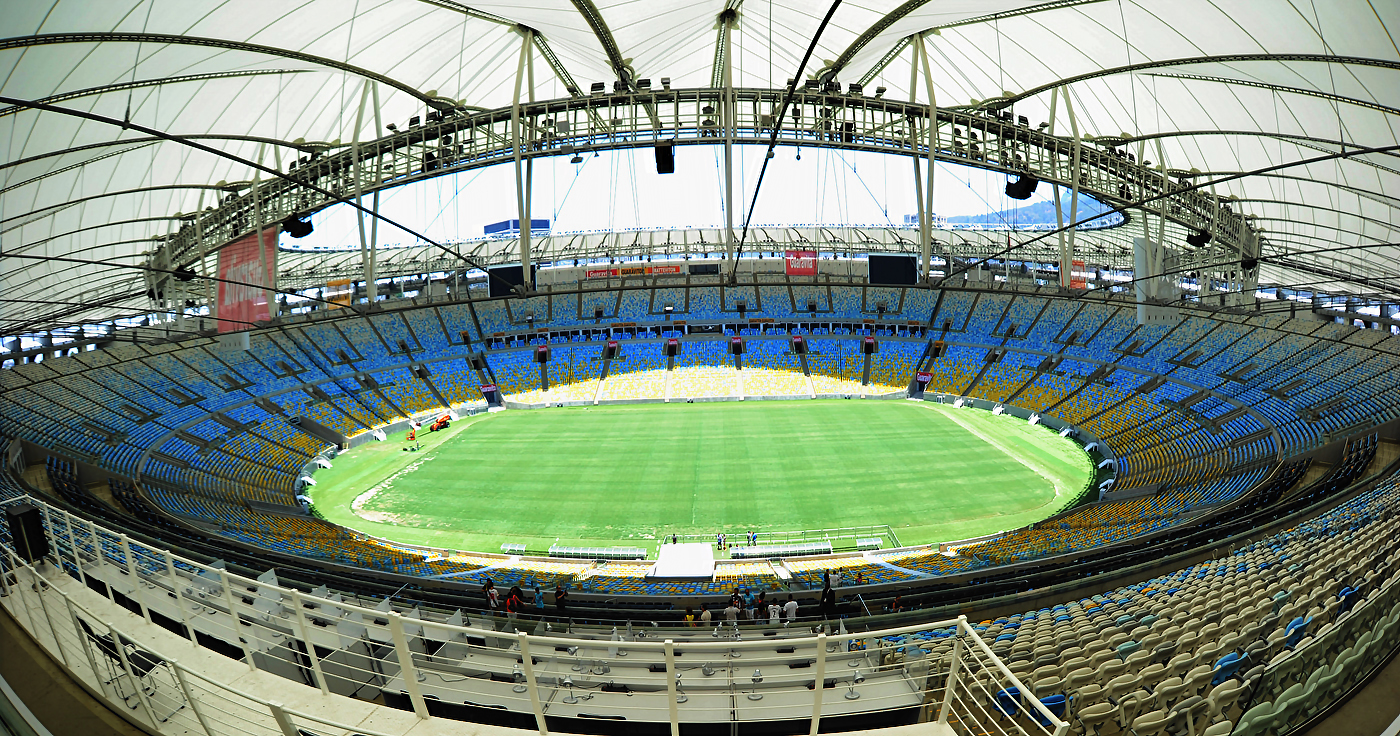
Maracanã in Rio de Janeiro hosted the second leg.

Man of the Match:
(Brazil) Pedro (Flamengo)

Assistant referees:
Bruno Raphael Pires (Goiás)
Bruno Boschilia (Paraná)
Fourth official:
André Luiz de Freitas Castro (Goiás)
Fifth official:
Fernanda Nândrea Gomes Antunes (Minas Gerais)
Video assistant referee:
Pablo Ramon Gonçalves Pinheiro (Rio Grande do Norte)
Assistant video assistant referees:
Flávio Gomes Barroca (Rio Grande do Norte)
Daniel Nobre Bins (Rio Grande do Sul)

== See also ==
- 2022 Campeonato Brasileiro Série A
