= 2022 Copa do Brasil first round =

Brazilian football competition

The 2022 Copa do Brasil first round was the first round of the 2022 Copa do Brasil football competition. It was played from 22 February to 3 March 2022. A total of 80 teams competed in the first round to decide 40 places in the second round of the tournament.

== Draw ==
The draw for the first and second rounds was held on 17 January 2022, 13:00 at CBF headquarters in Rio de Janeiro. Teams were seeded by their CBF ranking (shown in parentheses). The 80 qualified teams were divided in eight groups (A-H) with 10 teams each. The matches were drawn from the respective confronts: A vs. E; B vs. F; C vs. G; D vs. H. The lower-ranked teams hosted the first round match.

Group A	Group B	Group C	Group D
(Rio Grande do Sul) Grêmio (4); (São Paulo (state)) Santos (6); (São Paulo (state)) São Paulo (7); (Rio Grande do Sul) Internacional (8); Ceará (13); (Minas Gerais) Cruzeiro (14); (Goiás) Atlético Goianiense (16); (Santa Catarina (state)) Chapecoense (17); (Rio de Janeiro (state)) Vasco da Gama (19); (Pernambuco) Sport (21)	(Mato Grosso) Cuiabá (22); Goiás (23); (Rio Grande do Sul) Juventude (24); (Bahia) Vitória (25); (Paraná (state)) Coritiba (26); (Santa Catarina (state)) Avaí (27); (Alagoas) CRB (28); (São Paulo (state)) Ponte Preta (29); (Alagoas) CSA (30); (Goiás) Vila Nova (31)	(Maranhão) Sampaio Corrêa (32); (Paraná (state)) Paraná (33); (Paraná (state)) Operário Ferroviário (34); (São Paulo (state)) Guarani (35); (Santa Catarina (state)) Criciúma (36); (Rio Grande do Sul) Brasil de Pelotas (37); (Pernambuco) Náutico (38); (Paraná (state)) Londrina (39); (Pará) Paysandu (40); (Santa Catarina (state)) Figueirense (41)	(São Paulo (state)) Oeste (43); (Rio Grande do Norte) ABC (47); (São Paulo (state)) Botafogo (48); (Minas Gerais) Tombense (49); (Ceará) Ferroviário (52); (Rio de Janeiro (state)) Volta Redonda (53); (Amazonas (Brazilian state)) Manaus (55); (Bahia) Juazeirense (59); (Federal District (Brazil)) Brasiliense (63); (São Paulo (state)) Novorizontino (64)
Group E	Group F	Group G	Group H
(Piauí) Altos (66); (São Paulo (state)) Mirassol (70); (Paraíba) Campinense (72); (Maranhão) Moto Club (74); (Roraima) São Raimundo (78); (São Paulo (state)) Ferroviária (79); (Pernambuco) Salgueiro (81); (Rio Grande do Norte) Globo (82); (Mato Grosso) União Rondonópolis (83); Sergipe (90)	(Alagoas) ASA (91); (Paraná (state)) FC Cascavel (92); Bahia de Feira (93); (Bahia) Atlético de Alagoinhas (97); (Acre (state)) Rio Branco (98); (Minas Gerais) URT (118); (Rio de Janeiro (state)) Portuguesa (122); (Pará) Castanhal (123); (Rondônia) Porto Velho (131); (Paraíba) Sousa (143)	(Tocantins) Tocantinópolis (146); (Mato Grosso) CEOV (151); (Federal District (Brazil)) Ceilândia (169); (Espírito Santo) Real Noroeste (170); (Rio de Janeiro (state)) Nova Iguaçu (197); (Sergipe) Lagarto (214); (Amapá) Trem (228); (Rio de Janeiro (state)) Maricá (no rank); (Rio Grande do Sul) Glória (no rank); (Minas Gerais) Pouso Alegre (no rank)	(Paraná (state)) Azuriz (no rank); (Ceará) Icasa (no rank); (Goiás) Grêmio Anápolis (no rank); (Pará) Tuna Luso (no rank); (Maranhão) Tuntum (no rank); (Amazonas (Brazilian state)) São Raimundo (no rank); (Piauí) Fluminense (no rank); (Acre (state)) Humaitá (no rank); (Espírito Santo) Nova Venécia (no rank); (Mato Grosso do Sul) Costa Rica (no rank)

== Format ==
In the first round, each tie was played on a single-legged basis. The lower-ranked team hosted the match. If tied after 90 minutes, the higher-ranked team would automatically advance to second round.

== Matches ==
Times are BRT (UTC−3), as listed by CBF (local times, if different, are in parentheses).

Team 1	Score	Team 2
Moto Club (Maranhão)	3–2	(Santa Catarina (state)) Chapecoense
Icasa (Ceará)	0–0	(Minas Gerais) Tombense
Bahia de Feira	2–5	(Paraná (state)) Coritiba
Pouso Alegre (Minas Gerais)	2–0	(Paraná (state)) Paraná
Mirassol (São Paulo (state))	3–2	(Rio Grande do Sul) Grêmio
Azuriz (Paraná (state))	1–0	(São Paulo (state)) Botafogo
URT (Minas Gerais)	1–1	(Santa Catarina (state)) Avaí
Ceilândia (Federal District (Brazil))	2–0	(Paraná (state)) Londrina
União Rondonópolis (Mato Grosso)	0–3	(Goiás) Atlético Goianiense
Nova Venécia (Espírito Santo)	2–1	(Ceará) Ferroviário
Porto Velho (Rondônia)	1–2	(Rio Grande do Sul) Juventude
Real Noroeste (Espírito Santo)	2–1	(Paraná (state)) Operário Ferroviário
Ferroviária (São Paulo (state))	0–1	(Rio de Janeiro (state)) Vasco da Gama
Grêmio Anápolis (Goiás)	0–0	(Bahia) Juazeirense
Atlético de Alagoinhas (Bahia)	1–1	(Alagoas) CSA
Trem (Amapá)	0–3	(Pará) Paysandu
São Raimundo (Roraima)	0–3	Ceará
Tuna Luso (Pará)	1–0	(São Paulo (state)) Novorizontino
ASA (Alagoas)	0–2	(Mato Grosso) Cuiabá
Lagarto (Sergipe)	0–0	(Santa Catarina (state)) Figueirense
Altos (Piauí)	1–0	(Pernambuco) Sport
Costa Rica (Mato Grosso do Sul)	0–3	(Rio Grande do Norte) ABC
Sousa (Paraíba)	1–1	Goiás
Nova Iguaçu (Rio de Janeiro (state))	0–0	(Santa Catarina (state)) Criciúma
Globo (Rio Grande do Norte)	2–0	(Rio Grande do Sul) Internacional
Humaitá (Acre (state))	2–2	(Federal District (Brazil)) Brasiliense
Rio Branco (Acre (state))	0–0	(Goiás) Vila Nova
Maricá (Rio de Janeiro (state))	0–1	(São Paulo (state)) Guarani
Sergipe	0–5	(Minas Gerais) Cruzeiro
Tuntum (Maranhão)	4–2	(Rio de Janeiro (state)) Volta Redonda
Portuguesa (Rio de Janeiro (state))	1–0	(Alagoas) CRB
CEOV (Mato Grosso)	1–2	(Maranhão) Sampaio Corrêa
Campinense (Paraíba)	0–0	(São Paulo (state)) São Paulo
São Raimundo (Amazonas (Brazilian state))	0–1	(Amazonas (Brazilian state)) Manaus
FC Cascavel (Paraná (state))	1–0	(São Paulo (state)) Ponte Preta
Tocantinópolis (Tocantins)	1–0	(Pernambuco) Náutico
Salgueiro (Pernambuco)	0–3	(São Paulo (state)) Santos
Fluminense (Piauí)	2–0	(São Paulo (state)) Oeste
Castanhal (Pará)	1–1	(Bahia) Vitória
Glória (Rio Grande do Sul)	1–0	(Rio Grande do Sul) Brasil de Pelotas

=== Match 1 ===
1 March 2022
19:00

Moto Club (Maranhão)	3–2	(Santa Catarina (state)) Chapecoense
Dagson 11', 90+5' (pen.); Sousa 58' (o.g.)	Report	Tiago Real 20'; Perotti 34'

Castelão, São Luís
Attendance: 1,513
Referee: Pablo Ramon Gonçalves Pinheiro (Rio Grande do Norte)

=== Match 2 ===
1 March 2022
15:30

Icasa (Ceará)	0–0	(Minas Gerais) Tombense
	Report

Estádio Antônio Lírio Callou, Barbalha
Attendance: 823
Referee: Rafael Carlos Salgueiro Lima (Alagoas)

=== Match 3 ===
24 February 2022
19:00

Bahia de Feira	2–5	(Paraná (state)) Coritiba
Rhuann 23' (pen.); Caíque 63'	Report	Léo Gamalho 29' (pen.), 42'; Robinho 69'; Clayton 87', 90+3'

Estádio Jodilton Souza, Feira de Santana
Attendance: 1,300
Referee: Caio Max Augusto Vieira (Rio Grande do Norte)

=== Match 4 ===
1 March 2022
19:00

Pouso Alegre (Minas Gerais)	2–0	(Paraná (state)) Paraná
Eberê 27'; Denner 52'	Report

Estádio Municipal Irmão Gino Maria Rossi, Pouso Alegre
Attendance: 6,045
Referee: Thiago Lourenço de Mattos (São Paulo)

=== Match 5 ===
1 March 2022
21:30

Mirassol (São Paulo (state))	3–2	(Rio Grande do Sul) Grêmio
Camilo 5'; Fabrício Daniel 29'; Fabinho 53'	Report	Diego Souza 19'; Bruno Alves 22'

Estádio Municipal José Maria de Campos Maia, Mirassol
Attendance: 4,840
Referee: Ramon Abatti Abel (Santa Catarina)

=== Match 6 ===
23 February 2022
19:00

Azuriz (Paraná (state))	1–0	(São Paulo (state)) Botafogo
Salazar 90+4'	Report

Estádio Os Pioneiros, Pato Branco
Attendance: 2,014
Referee: Paulo Henrique de Melo Salmazio (Mato Grosso do Sul)

=== Match 7 ===
22 February 2022
19:00

URT (Minas Gerais)	1–1	(Santa Catarina (state)) Avaí
Cebolinha 83'	Report	Muriqui 69'

Estádio Zama Maciel, Patos de Minas
Attendance: 2,349
Referee: Jefferson Ferreira de Moraes (Goiás)

=== Match 8 ===
2 March 2022
15:30

Ceilândia (Federal District (Brazil))	2–0	(Paraná (state)) Londrina
Cabralzinho 15'; Gabriel Pedra 65'	Report

Estádio Maria de Lourdes Abadia, Ceilândia
Attendance: 0
Referee: Jean Pierre Gonçalves Lima (Rio Grande do Sul)

=== Match 9 ===
3 March 2022
19:00
(18:00 UTC−4)

União Rondonópolis (Mato Grosso)	0–3	(Goiás) Atlético Goianiense
	Report	Dellatorre 45+2'; Airton 90+2'; Shaylon 90+4'

Estádio Engenheiro Luthero Lopes, Rondonópolis
Attendance: 2,993
Referee: Héber Lopes (Santa Catarina)

=== Match 10 ===
3 March 2022
15:30

Nova Venécia (Espírito Santo)	2–1	(Ceará) Ferroviário
Patrick Carvalho 68'; Carlos Vitor 89' (pen.)	Report	Wandson 39'

Estádio Zenor Pedrosa Rocha, Nova Venécia
Attendance: 994
Referee: Felipe da Silva Gonçalves Paludo (Rio de Janeiro)

=== Match 11 ===
2 March 2022
16:30
(15:30 UTC−4)

Porto Velho (Rondônia)	1–2	(Rio Grande do Sul) Juventude
Yan Philippe 45+2'	Report	Pitta 45+1'; Ricardo Bueno 81' (pen.)

Estádio Aluízio Ferreira, Porto Velho
Attendance: 1,050
Referee: Rodrigo Batista Raposo (Distrito Federal)

=== Match 12 ===
2 March 2022
19:00

Real Noroeste (Espírito Santo)	2–1	(Paraná (state)) Operário Ferroviário
Ícaro Alves 6'; Alex Pixote 43'	Report	Paulo Sérgio 12'

Estádio José Olímpio da Rocha, Águia Branca
Attendance: 556
Referee: Rodrigo José Pereira de Lima (Pernambuco)

=== Match 13 ===
2 March 2022
21:30

Ferroviária (São Paulo (state))	0–1	(Rio de Janeiro (state)) Vasco da Gama
	Report	Raniel 24'

Estádio Fonte Luminosa, Araraquara
Attendance: 2,673
Referee: Leandro Pedro Vuaden (Rio Grande do Sul)

=== Match 14 ===
2 March 2022
20:30

Grêmio Anápolis (Goiás)	0–0	(Bahia) Juazeirense
	Report

Estádio Jonas Duarte, Anápolis
Attendance: 746
Referee: Marco Aurelio Augusto Fazekas Ferreira (Minas Gerais)

=== Match 15 ===
23 February 2022
21:30

Atlético de Alagoinhas (Bahia)	1–1	(Alagoas) CSA
Thiaguinho 40'	Report	Marco Túlio 29'

Estádio Municipal Antônio de Figueiredo Carneiro, Alagoinhas
Attendance: 1,102
Referee: Antônio Dib Moraes de Sousa (Piauí)

=== Match 16 ===
2 March 2022
20:30

Trem (Amapá)	0–3	(Pará) Paysandu
	Report	Genílson 22'; Mikael 56'; Dioguinho 78'

Zerão, Macapá
Attendance: 0
Referee: André Rodrigo Rocha (Roraima)

=== Match 17 ===
2 March 2022
19:00
(18:00 UTC−4)

São Raimundo (Roraima)	0–3	Ceará
	Report	Mendoza 23'; Cléber 62'; João Vitor 90+1' (o.g.)

Estádio Canarinho, Boa Vista
Attendance: 2,337
Referee: Thiago Luís Scarascati (São Paulo)

=== Match 18 ===
2 March 2022
15:30

Tuna Luso (Pará)	1–0	(São Paulo (state)) Novorizontino
Lucão 12'	Report

Baenão, Belém
Attendance: 422
Referee: Diego Pombo Lopez (Bahia)

=== Match 19 ===
23 February 2022
19:00

ASA (Alagoas)	0–2	(Mato Grosso) Cuiabá
	Report	Élton 3' (pen.); Rodriguinho 61'

Estádio Municipal Coaracy da Mata Fonseca, Arapiraca
Attendance: 3,297
Referee: Vinícius Gonçalves Dias Araújo (São Paulo)

=== Match 20 ===
22 February 2022
16:30

Lagarto (Sergipe)	0–0	(Santa Catarina (state)) Figueirense
	Report

Estádio Paulo Barreto de Menezes, Lagarto
Attendance: 811
Referee: Rafael Martins de Sá (Rio de Janeiro)

=== Match 21 ===
2 March 2022
19:00

Altos (Piauí)	1–0	(Pernambuco) Sport
Betinho 64'	Report

Lindolfinho, Teresina
Attendance: 891
Referee: Luiz César de Oliveira Magalhães (Ceará)

=== Match 22 ===
2 March 2022
21:00
(20:00 UTC−4)

Costa Rica (Mato Grosso do Sul)	0–3	(Rio Grande do Norte) ABC
	Report	Fábio Lima 5', 85'; Allan Dias 63'

Estádio Municipal Laerte Paes Coelho, Costa Rica
Attendance: 1,208
Referee: Djonaltan Costa de Araújo (Pará)

=== Match 23 ===
1 March 2022
21:30

Sousa (Paraíba)	1–1	Goiás
Esquerdinha 31'	Report	Nicolas 14'

Estádio Antônio Mariz, Sousa
Attendance: 1,400
Referee: Marielson Alves Silva (Bahia)

=== Match 24 ===
24 February 2022
15:30

Nova Iguaçu (Rio de Janeiro (state))	0–0	(Santa Catarina (state)) Criciúma
	Report

Estádio Jânio Moraes, Nova Iguaçu
Attendance: 903
Referee: Dyorgines José Padovani de Andrade (Espírito Santo)

=== Match 25 ===
3 March 2022
21:30

Globo (Rio Grande do Norte)	2–0	(Rio Grande do Sul) Internacional
Fernando Ceará 54'; Rômulo 87'	Report

Barrettão, Ceará-Mirim
Attendance: 740
Referee: Dênis da Silva Ribeiro Serafim (Alagoas)

=== Match 26 ===
23 February 2022
22:00
(20:00 UTC−5)

Humaitá (Acre (state))	2–2	(Federal District (Brazil)) Brasiliense
Aldair 4'; Luiz Fernando 79'	Report	Marcão 34' (pen.); Badhuga 66'

Estádio Antônio Aquino Lopes, Rio Branco
Attendance: 370
Referee: Douglas Marques das Flores (São Paulo)

=== Match 27 ===
2 March 2022
20:00
(18:00 UTC−5)

Rio Branco (Acre (state))	0–0	(Goiás) Vila Nova
	Report

Estádio Antônio Aquino Lopes, Rio Branco
Attendance: 517
Referee: Igor Junio Benevenuto (Minas Gerais)

=== Match 28 ===
1 March 2022
16:00

Maricá (Rio de Janeiro (state))	0–1	(São Paulo (state)) Guarani
	Report	Lucão do Break 80'

Estádio Elcyr Resende de Mendonça, Saquarema
Attendance: 1,396
Referee: Paulo Henrique Schleich Vollkopf (Mato Grosso do Sul)

=== Match 29 ===
23 February 2022
21:30

Sergipe	0–5	(Minas Gerais) Cruzeiro
	Report	Edu 51'; João Paulo 68'; Thiago 73'; Vitor Roque 84', 86'

Batistão, Aracaju
Attendance: 1,472
Referee: Douglas Schwengber da Silva (Rio Grande do Sul)

=== Match 30 ===
23 February 2022
15:30

Tuntum (Maranhão)	4–2	(Rio de Janeiro (state)) Volta Redonda
Andrezinho 10', 38'; Maicon 30'; Vagalume 47'	Report	Pedrinho 45+2' (pen.); Lelê 67'

Estádio Rafael Seabra, Tuntum
Attendance: 1,637
Referee: Ivan da Silva Guimarães Júnior (Amazonas)

=== Match 31 ===
2 March 2022
21:30

Portuguesa (Rio de Janeiro (state))	1–0	(Alagoas) CRB
Sanchez 50'	Report

Estádio Luso Brasileiro, Rio de Janeiro
Attendance: 2,500
Referee: Daniel Nobre Bins (Rio Grande do Sul)

=== Match 32 ===
2 March 2022
16:30
(15:30 UTC−4)

CEOV (Mato Grosso)	1–2	(Maranhão) Sampaio Corrêa
Luan Viana 76'	Report	Nilson Júnior 63'; Eron 69'

Estádio Municipal Dito Souza, Várzea Grande
Attendance: 611
Referee: José Mendonça da Silva Júnior (Paraná)

=== Match 33 ===
24 February 2022
21:30

Campinense (Paraíba)	0–0	(São Paulo (state)) São Paulo
	Report

Amigão, Campina Grande
Attendance: 5,120
Referee: Ramon Abatti Abel (Santa Catarina)

=== Match 34 ===
24 February 2022
16:30
(15:30 UTC−4)

São Raimundo (Amazonas (Brazilian state))	0–1	(Amazonas (Brazilian state)) Manaus
	Report	Thiaguinho 41'

Estádio Ismael Benigno, Manaus
Attendance: 1,202
Referee: Jonathan Antero Silva (Rondônia)

=== Match 35 ===
22 February 2022
21:30

FC Cascavel (Paraná (state))	1–0	(São Paulo (state)) Ponte Preta
Diego Giaretta 45+3'	Report

Estádio Olímpico Regional Arnaldo Busatto, Cascavel
Attendance: 4,847
Referee: Rodrigo Carvalhães de Miranda (Rio de Janeiro)

=== Match 36 ===
23 February 2022
20:30

Tocantinópolis (Tocantins)	1–0	(Pernambuco) Náutico
Raí 17'	Report

Estádio João Ribeiro, Tocantinópolis
Attendance: 1,733
Referee: Dewson Fernando Freitas da Silva (Pará)

=== Match 37 ===
23 February 2022
19:00

Salgueiro (Pernambuco)	0–3	(São Paulo (state)) Santos
	Report	Ângelo 24'; Vinícius Zanocelo 76'; Rwan 90+1'

Estádio Cornélio de Barros, Salgueiro
Attendance: 474
Referee: Felipe Fernandes de Lima (Minas Gerais)

=== Match 38 ===
24 February 2022
15:30

Fluminense (Piauí)	2–0	(São Paulo (state)) Oeste
Mário Sérgio 21', 86'	Report

Albertão, Teresina
Attendance: 0
Referee: Rodrigo da Fonseca Silva (Mato Grosso)

=== Match 39 ===
3 March 2022
20:30

Castanhal (Pará)	1–1	(Bahia) Vitória
Leandro Cearense 14'	Report	Mateus Moraes 25'

Estádio da Curuzu, Belém
Attendance: 293
Referee: Salim Fende Chavez (São Paulo)

=== Match 40 ===
23 February 2022
20:00

Glória (Rio Grande do Sul)	1–0	(Rio Grande do Sul) Brasil de Pelotas
Leonardo 77'	Report

Estádio Altos da Glória, Vacaria
Attendance: 941
Referee: Rodrigo D'Alonso Ferreira (Santa Catarina)
