= 2022 Copa do Brasil second round =

The 2022 Copa do Brasil second round was the second round of the 2022 Copa do Brasil football competition. It was played from 8 to 23 March 2022. A total of 40 teams competed in the second round to decide 20 places in the third round of the 2022 Copa do Brasil.

== Format ==
In the second round, each tie was played on a single-legged basis. If the score was level, the match would go straight to the penalty shoot-out to determine the winners. Host teams were settled in the first-round draw.

== Matches ==
Times are BRT (UTC−3), as listed by CBF (local times, if different, are in parentheses).

Team 1	Score	Team 2
Moto Club (Maranhão)	1–1 (2–4 p)	(Minas Gerais) Tombense
Pouso Alegre (Minas Gerais)	1–1 (2–3 p)	(Paraná (state)) Coritiba
Azuriz (Paraná (state))	1–0	(São Paulo (state)) Mirassol
Avaí (Santa Catarina (state))	1–2	(Federal District (Brazil)) Ceilândia
Atlético Goianiense (Goiás)	2–1	(Espírito Santo) Nova Venécia
Real Noroeste (Espírito Santo)	0–1	(Rio Grande do Sul) Juventude
Juazeirense (Bahia)	1–1 (4–2 p)	(Rio de Janeiro (state)) Vasco da Gama
CSA (Alagoas)	4–1	(Pará) Paysandu
Ceará	2–0	(Pará) Tuna Luso
Figueirense (Santa Catarina (state))	2–2 (2–4 p)	(Mato Grosso) Cuiabá
ABC (Rio Grande do Norte)	1–1 (2–4 p)	(Piauí) Altos
Goiás	1–0	(Santa Catarina (state)) Criciúma
Globo (Rio Grande do Norte)	1–1 (1–4 p)	(Federal District (Brazil)) Brasiliense
Guarani (São Paulo (state))	2–2 (4–5 p)	(Goiás) Vila Nova
Tuntum (Maranhão)	0–3	(Minas Gerais) Cruzeiro
Portuguesa (Rio de Janeiro (state))	2–0	(Maranhão) Sampaio Corrêa
São Paulo (São Paulo (state))	2–0	(Amazonas (Brazilian state)) Manaus
Tocantinópolis (Tocantins)	2–0	(Paraná (state)) FC Cascavel
Fluminense (Piauí)	1–1 (4–5 p)	(São Paulo (state)) Santos
Vitória (Bahia)	2–0	(Rio Grande do Sul) Glória

=== Match 41 ===
16 March 2022
19:00

Moto Club (Maranhão)	1–1	(Minas Gerais) Tombense
Emerson Nike 13'	Report	Ciel 39'
Penalties
Dagson (penalty scored); Ozeias (penalty missed); Jair Berlitz (penalty scored); Enzzo (penalty missed)	2–4	(penalty scored) Zé Ricardo; (penalty scored) Lucas Santos; (penalty scored) Manoel; (penalty scored) David

Estádio Nhozinho Santos, São Luís
Attendance: 2,869
Referee: Paulo Henrique de Melo Salmazio (Mato Grosso do Sul)

=== Match 42 ===
10 March 2022
21:30

Pouso Alegre (Minas Gerais)	1–1	(Paraná (state)) Coritiba
Gledson 79'	Report	De los Santos 50'
Penalties
Foguinho (penalty missed); Nando (penalty missed); Luanderson (penalty scored); Gledson (penalty scored); João Marcos (penalty missed)	2–3	(penalty scored) Henrique; (penalty missed) Andrey; (penalty scored) Val; (penalty scored) Régis

Estádio Municipal Irmão Gino Maria Rossi, Pouso Alegre
Attendance: 9,453
Referee: Douglas Schwengber da Silva (Rio Grande do Sul)

=== Match 43 ===
9 March 2022
19:00

Azuriz (Paraná (state))	1–0	(São Paulo (state)) Mirassol
Berguinho 10'	Report

Estádio Os Pioneiros, Pato Branco
Attendance: 2,889
Referee: Rodrigo D'Alonso Ferreira (Santa Catarina)

=== Match 44 ===
10 March 2022
22:30 (Note: The match originally scheduled for 21:30 was delayed for an hour due to rain.)

Avaí (Santa Catarina (state))	1–2	(Federal District (Brazil)) Ceilândia
Morato 21'	Report	Crystian 20'; Gabriel Vidal 90'

Estádio da Ressacada, Florianópolis
Attendance: 5,217
Referee: Vinícius Gonçalves Dias Araújo (São Paulo)

=== Match 45 ===
15 March 2022
19:00

Atlético Goianiense (Goiás)	2–1	(Espírito Santo) Nova Venécia
Shaylon 18', 44'	Report	Carlos Vitor 32' (pen.)

Estádio Antônio Accioly, Goiânia
Attendance: 2,451
Referee: Dewson Fernando Freitas da Silva (Pará)

=== Match 46 ===
17 March 2022
19:00

Real Noroeste (Espírito Santo)	0–1	(Rio Grande do Sul) Juventude
	Report	Chico 26'

Estádio José Olímpio da Rocha, Águia Branca
Attendance: 1,996
Referee: Rodrigo Carvalhães de Miranda (Rio de Janeiro)

=== Match 47 ===
9 March 2022
21:30

Juazeirense (Bahia)	1–1	(Rio de Janeiro (state)) Vasco da Gama
Nildo Petrolina 33'	Report	Bruno Nazário 5'
Penalties
Clébson (penalty scored); Wendell (penalty scored); Ian Augusto (penalty scored); Nildo Petrolina (penalty scored)	4–2	(penalty missed) Nenê; (penalty scored) Yuri; (penalty scored) Raniel; (penalty missed) Anderson Conceição

Estádio Adauto Moraes, Juazeiro
Attendance: 1,642
Referee: Paulo Roberto Alves Júnior (Paraná)

=== Match 48 ===
16 March 2022
21:30

CSA (Alagoas)	4–1	(Pará) Paysandu
Werley 33', 60'; Yann Rolim 63'; Lucas Barcelos 69'	Report	Danrlei 53'

Estádio Rei Pelé, Maceió
Attendance: 7,563
Referee: Rodrigo Batista Raposo (Distrito Federal)

=== Match 49 ===
15 March 2022
21:30

Ceará	2–0	(Pará) Tuna Luso
Vina 70'; Cléber 87'	Report

Castelão, Fortaleza
Attendance: 14,551
Referee: Marielson Alves Silva (Bahia)

=== Match 50 ===
8 March 2022
21:30

Figueirense (Santa Catarina (state))	2–2	(Mato Grosso) Cuiabá
Zé Mário 74'; Paulão 82' (o.g.)	Report	Rodriguinho 55'; Élton 80' (pen.)
Penalties
Zé Mário (penalty missed); Gustavo Henrique (penalty missed); Natan Masiero (penalty scored); Luis Gustavo (penalty scored)	2–4	(penalty scored) Alan Empereur; (penalty scored) Élton; (penalty scored) Pepê; (penalty scored) João Lucas

Estádio Orlando Scarpelli, Florianópolis
Attendance: 6,066
Referee: Paulo César Zanovelli (Minas Gerais)

=== Match 51 ===
16 March 2022
16:00

ABC (Rio Grande do Norte)	1–1	(Piauí) Altos
Fábio Lima 5'	Report	Dieguinho 66'
Penalties
Ícaro (penalty scored); Richardson (penalty missed); Felipinho (penalty scored); Fábio Lima (penalty missed)	2–4	(penalty scored) Eliélton; (penalty scored) Sousa Tibiri; (penalty scored) Dico; (penalty scored) Diego Viana

Frasqueirão, Natal
Attendance: 0
Referee: Fábio Augusto Santos Sá Júnior (Sergipe)

=== Match 52 ===
17 March 2022
21:30

Goiás	1–0	(Santa Catarina (state)) Criciúma
Nicolas 73'	Report

Estádio da Serrinha, Goiânia
Attendance: 9,984
Referee: Douglas Schwengber da Silva (Rio Grande do Sul)

=== Match 53 ===
16 March 2022
20:30

Globo (Rio Grande do Norte)	1–1	(Federal District (Brazil)) Brasiliense
Eduardo Bahia 68'	Report	Tobinha 52'
Penalties
Adílio Gomes (penalty missed); Maranhão (penalty missed); Rômulo (penalty scored)	1–4	(penalty scored) Aloísio; (penalty scored) Aldo; (penalty scored) Erick Daltro; (penalty scored) Marcão

Barrettão, Ceará-Mirim
Attendance: 501
Referee: Rafael Martins de Sá (Rio de Janeiro)

=== Match 54 ===
15 March 2022
21:30

Guarani (São Paulo (state))	2–2	(Goiás) Vila Nova
Giovanni Augusto 4', 89'	Report	Renato Silveira 21'; Arthur Rezende 54' (pen.)
Penalties
Giovanni Augusto (penalty scored); Lucas Venuto (penalty scored); Nicolas Careca (penalty scored); Rodrigo Andrade (penalty missed); Lucão do Break (penalty scored); Ronaldo Alves (penalty missed)	4–5	(penalty scored) Rubens; (penalty scored) Arthur Rezende; (penalty scored) Matheuzinho; (penalty scored) Rafael Donato; (penalty missed) Jean Silva; (penalty scored) Pablo Dyego

Estádio Brinco de Ouro, Campinas
Attendance: 2,646
Referee: Antônio Dib Moraes de Sousa (Piauí)

=== Match 55 ===
16 March 2022
20:30

Tuntum (Maranhão)	0–3	(Minas Gerais) Cruzeiro
	Report	Vitor Roque 12'; Edu 50' (pen.), 65'

Estádio Rafael Seabra, Tuntum
Attendance: 2,954
Referee: Thiago Luís Scarascati (São Paulo)

=== Match 56 ===
15 March 2022
16:00

Portuguesa (Rio de Janeiro (state))	2–0	(Maranhão) Sampaio Corrêa
Leandro Amaro 85'; Patrick 90+9'	Report

Estádio Luso Brasileiro, Rio de Janeiro
Attendance: 2,247
Referee: Héber Lopes (Santa Catarina)

=== Match 57 ===
16 March 2022
21:30

São Paulo (São Paulo (state))	2–0	(Amazonas (Brazilian state)) Manaus
Éder 34'; Diego Costa 42'	Report

Estádio do Morumbi, São Paulo
Attendance: 17,644
Referee: Daniel Nobre Bins (Rio Grande do Sul)

=== Match 58 ===
16 March 2022
20:30

Tocantinópolis (Tocantins)	2–0	(Paraná (state)) FC Cascavel
Bilau 12'; Veraldo 90'	Report

Estádio João Ribeiro, Tocantinópolis
Attendance: 2,212
Referee: Douglas Marques das Flores (São Paulo)

=== Match 59 ===
8 March 2022
21:30

Fluminense (Piauí)	1–1	(São Paulo (state)) Santos
Mário Sérgio 41'	Report	Ricardo Goulart 81'
Penalties
Eduardo (penalty scored); Mazinho (penalty missed); Michel (penalty scored); Tarcísio (penalty scored); Tiaguinho (penalty scored); Ramon (penalty missed)	4–5	(penalty scored) Ricardo Goulart; (penalty scored) Vinícius Zanocelo; (penalty missed) Gabriel Pirani; (penalty scored) Lucas Braga; (penalty scored) Lucas Barbosa; (penalty scored) Lucas Pires

Albertão, Teresina
Attendance: 2,991
Referee: Diego Pombo Lopez (Bahia)

=== Match 60 ===
23 March 2022
21:30

Vitória (Bahia)	2–0	(Rio Grande do Sul) Glória
Jádson 90' (pen.); Luidy 90+4'	Report

Barradão, Salvador
Attendance: 4,095
Referee: Jefferson Ferreira de Moraes (Goiás)
