= 2022 Copa do Brasil third round =

2022 Copa do Brasil football competition

The 2022 Copa do Brasil third round was the third round of the 2022 Copa do Brasil football competition. It was played from 19 April to 31 May 2022. A total of 32 teams competed in the third round to decide 16 places in the final rounds of the 2022 Copa do Brasil.

== Draw ==
The draw for the third round was held on 28 March 2022, 15:00 at CBF headquarters in Rio de Janeiro. In a first draw, the 32 teams, seeded by their CBF ranking, were drawn into 16 ties. The home and away teams of each leg were decided in a second draw. CBF ranking is shown in parentheses.

Pot A	Pot B
(Rio de Janeiro (state)) Flamengo (1); (São Paulo (state)) Palmeiras (2); (Minas Gerais) Atlético Mineiro (3); (Paraná (state)) Athletico Paranaense (5); (São Paulo (state)) Santos (6); (São Paulo (state)) São Paulo (7); (Rio de Janeiro (state)) Fluminense (9); (São Paulo (state)) Corinthians (10); (Ceará) Fortaleza (11); Bahia (12); Ceará (13); (Minas Gerais) Cruzeiro (14); (Minas Gerais) América Mineiro (15); (Goiás) Atlético Goianiense (16); (Rio de Janeiro (state)) Botafogo (18); (São Paulo (state)) Red Bull Bragantino (20)	(Mato Grosso) Cuiabá (22); Goiás (23); (Rio Grande do Sul) Juventude (24); (Bahia) Vitória (25); (Paraná (state)) Coritiba (26); (Alagoas) CSA (30); (Goiás) Vila Nova (31); (Pará) Remo (42); (Minas Gerais) Tombense (49); (Bahia) Juazeirense (59); (Federal District (Brazil)) Brasiliense (63); (Piauí) Altos (66); (Rio de Janeiro (state)) Portuguesa (122); (Tocantins) Tocantinópolis (146); (Federal District (Brazil)) Ceilândia (169); (Paraná (state)) Azuriz (no rank)

== Format ==
In the third round, each tie was played on a home-and-away two-legged basis. If the aggregate score was level, the second-leg match would go straight to the penalty shoot-out to determine the winners.

== Matches ==
Times are BRT (UTC−3), as listed by CBF (local times, if different, are in parentheses).

Team 1	Agg.	Team 2	1st leg	2nd leg
Goiás	2–2 (9–8 p)	(São Paulo (state)) Red Bull Bragantino	1–2	1–0
Atlético Goianiense (Goiás)	1–1 (5–3 p)	(Mato Grosso) Cuiabá	1–1	0–0
Tombense (Minas Gerais)	0–4	Ceará	0–2	0–2
Fluminense (Rio de Janeiro (state))	5–2	(Goiás) Vila Nova	3–2	2–0
Bahia	1–1 (4–3 p)	(Paraná (state)) Azuriz	0–0	1–1
Juventude (Rio Grande do Sul)	2–4	(São Paulo (state)) São Paulo	2–2	0–2
Portuguesa (Rio de Janeiro (state))	1–3	(São Paulo (state)) Corinthians	1–1	0–2
Ceilândia (Federal District (Brazil))	0–6	(Rio de Janeiro (state)) Botafogo	0–3	0–3
Atlético Mineiro (Minas Gerais)	4–0	(Federal District (Brazil)) Brasiliense	3–0	1–0
Fortaleza (Ceará)	4–0	(Bahia) Vitória	3–0	1–0
Tocantinópolis (Tocantins)	2–9	(Paraná (state)) Athletico Paranaense	2–5	0–4
Palmeiras (São Paulo (state))	4–2	(Bahia) Juazeirense	2–1	2–1
CSA (Alagoas)	0–5	(Minas Gerais) América Mineiro	0–3	0–2
Remo (Pará)	2–2 (4–5 p)	(Minas Gerais) Cruzeiro	2–1	0–1
Altos (Piauí)	1–4	(Rio de Janeiro (state)) Flamengo	1–2	0–2
Coritiba (Paraná (state))	1–3	(São Paulo (state)) Santos	1–0	0–3

=== Match 61 ===
20 April 2022
19:00

Goiás	1–2	(São Paulo (state)) Red Bull Bragantino
Apodi 8'	Report	Ytalo 20' (pen.); Luan Cândido 62'

Estádio da Serrinha, Goiânia
Attendance: 12,562
Referee: Anderson Daronco (Rio Grande do Sul)

31 May 2022
21:30

Red Bull Bragantino (São Paulo (state))	0–1	Goiás
	Report	Matheus Sales 43'
Penalties
Artur (penalty missed); Lucas Evangelista (penalty scored); Hurtado (penalty scored); Luan Cândido (penalty scored); Alerrandro (penalty missed); Aderlan (penalty missed); Cleiton (penalty scored); Natan (penalty scored); Jadsom (penalty scored); Bruno Tubarão (penalty scored); Lomónaco (penalty scored); Artur (penalty missed); Aderlan (penalty missed)	8–9	(penalty missed) Fellipe Bastos; (penalty missed) Nicolas; (penalty scored) Matheus Sales; (penalty scored) Danilo Barcelos; (penalty scored) Matheusinho; (penalty missed) Caetano; (penalty scored) Tadeu; (penalty scored) Sidimar; (penalty scored) Reynaldo; (penalty scored) Auremir; (penalty scored) Maguinho; (penalty missed) Danilo Barcelos; (penalty scored) Fellipe Bastos

Estádio Nabi Abi Chedid, Bragança Paulista
Attendance: 1,668
Referee: Leandro Pedro Vuaden (Rio Grande do Sul)

Tied 2–2 on aggregate, Goiás won on penalties and advanced to the round of 16.

=== Match 62 ===
21 April 2022
21:30

Atlético Goianiense (Goiás)	1–1	(Mato Grosso) Cuiabá
Edson 70'	Report	Élton 81'

Estádio Antônio Accioly, Goiânia
Attendance: 3,843
Referee: Felipe Fernandes de Lima (Minas Gerais)

11 May 2022
22:00
(21:00 UTC−4)

Cuiabá (Mato Grosso)	0–0	(Goiás) Atlético Goianiense
	Report
Penalties
Alan Empereur (penalty scored); Pepê (penalty missed); Uendel (penalty scored); Rodriguinho (penalty scored)	3–5	(penalty scored) Airton; (penalty scored) Gabriel Baralhas; (penalty scored) Léo Pereira; (penalty scored) Edson Fernando; (penalty scored) Marlon Freitas

Arena Pantanal, Cuiabá
Attendance: 9,156
Referee: Luiz Flávio de Oliveira (São Paulo)

Tied 1–1 on aggregate, Atlético Goianiense won on penalties and advanced to the round of 16.

=== Match 63 ===
20 April 2022
21:30

Tombense (Minas Gerais)	0–2	Ceará
	Report	Vina 13', 80'

Estádio Soares de Azevedo, Muriaé
Attendance: 1,391
Referee: Diego Pombo Lopez (Bahia)

11 May 2022
19:00

Ceará	2–0	(Minas Gerais) Tombense
Lima 33'; Nino Paraíba 83'	Report

Castelão, Fortaleza
Attendance: 13,305
Referee: Paulo Roberto Alves Júnior (Paraná)

Ceará won 4–0 on aggregate and advanced to the round of 16.

=== Match 64 ===
19 April 2022
21:30

Fluminense (Rio de Janeiro (state))	3–2	(Goiás) Vila Nova
Ganso 66' (pen.); Cano 71'; Fred 88'	Report	Rafael Donato 37'; Pablo Dyego 56'

Maracanã, Rio de Janeiro
Attendance: 10,046
Referee: Rodolpho Toski Marques (Paraná)

11 May 2022
21:30

Vila Nova (Goiás)	0–2	(Rio de Janeiro (state)) Fluminense
	Report	Cano 9'; Luiz Henrique 66'

Estádio Serra Dourada, Goiânia
Attendance: 29,631
Referee: Anderson Daronco (Rio Grande do Sul)

Fluminense won 5–2 on aggregate and advanced to the round of 16.

=== Match 65 ===
19 April 2022
19:30

Bahia	0–0	(Paraná (state)) Azuriz
	Report

Arena Fonte Nova, Salvador
Attendance: 12,279
Referee: Douglas Marques das Flores (São Paulo)

10 May 2022
20:30

Azuriz (Paraná (state))	1–1	Bahia
Wenderson 11'	Report	Marcelo Ryan 68'
Penalties
Vieira (penalty missed); Léo (penalty scored); Edson Carioca (penalty scored); Vinícius Guarapuava (penalty scored); Igor Bosel (penalty missed)	3–4	(penalty scored) Danielzinho; (penalty scored) Lucas Falcão; (penalty scored) Djalma Silva; (penalty missed) Marco Antônio; (penalty scored) Marcelo Ryan

Estádio Os Pioneiros, Pato Branco
Attendance: 6,029
Referee: André Luiz de Freitas Castro (Goiás)

Tied 1–1 on aggregate, Bahia won on penalties and advanced to the round of 16.

=== Match 66 ===
20 April 2022
19:30

Juventude (Rio Grande do Sul)	2–2	(São Paulo (state)) São Paulo
Pitta 24'; Ruiz 33'	Report	Arboleda 47'; Reinaldo 90+3' (pen.)

Estádio Alfredo Jaconi, Caxias do Sul
Attendance: 6,092
Referee: Wagner do Nascimento Magalhães (Rio de Janeiro)

12 May 2022
19:30

São Paulo (São Paulo (state))	2–0	(Rio Grande do Sul) Juventude
Arboleda 27'; Igor Vinícius 68'	Report

Arena Barueri, Barueri
Attendance: 14,806
Referee: Wilton Sampaio (Goiás)

São Paulo won 4–2 on aggregate and advanced to the round of 16.

=== Match 67 ===
20 April 2022
21:30

Portuguesa (Rio de Janeiro (state))	1–1	(São Paulo (state)) Corinthians
Cafu 2'	Report	Jô 44'

Estádio do Café, Londrina
Attendance: 17,195
Referee: Paulo Roberto Alves Júnior (Paraná)

11 May 2022
21:30

Corinthians (São Paulo (state))	2–0	(Rio de Janeiro (state)) Portuguesa
Júnior Moraes 8'; Giuliano 31'	Report

Neo Química Arena, São Paulo
Attendance: 35,081
Referee: Ramon Abatti Abel (Santa Catarina)

Corinthians won 3–1 on aggregate and advanced to the round of 16.

=== Match 68 ===
20 April 2022
21:30

Ceilândia (Federal District (Brazil))	0–3	(Rio de Janeiro (state)) Botafogo
	Report	Kanu 18', 53'; Lucas Piazon 54'

Arena BRB Mané Garrincha, Brasília
Attendance: 28,110
Referee: Bráulio da Silva Machado (Santa Catarina)

12 May 2022
21:30

Botafogo (Rio de Janeiro (state))	3–0	(Federal District (Brazil)) Ceilândia
Patrick de Paula 40'; Matheus Nascimento 65', 81'	Report

Estádio Olímpico Nilton Santos, Rio de Janeiro
Attendance: 18,648
Referee: Ricardo Marques (Minas Gerais)

Botafogo won 6–0 on aggregate and advanced to the round of 16.

=== Match 69 ===
20 April 2022
19:00

Atlético Mineiro (Minas Gerais)	3–0	(Federal District (Brazil)) Brasiliense
Eduardo Sasha 3', 8', 40'	Report

Mineirão, Belo Horizonte
Attendance: 20,062
Referee: Thiago Luís Scarascati (São Paulo)

22 May 2022
19:00

Brasiliense (Federal District (Brazil))	0–1	(Minas Gerais) Atlético Mineiro
	Report	Fábio Gomes 16'

Estádio Kléber Andrade, Cariacica
Attendance: 5,675
Referee: Douglas Marques das Flores (São Paulo)

Atlético Mineiro won 4–0 on aggregate and advanced to the round of 16.

=== Match 70 ===
20 April 2022
19:00

Fortaleza (Ceará)	3–0	(Bahia) Vitória
Romero 17', 27'; Moisés 71'	Report

Castelão, Fortaleza
Attendance: 18,100
Referee: Sávio Pereira Sampaio (Distrito Federal)

12 May 2022
19:00

Vitória (Bahia)	0–1	(Ceará) Fortaleza
	Report	Yago Pikachu 90+2'

Barradão, Salvador
Attendance: 2,405
Referee: Paulo César Zanovelli (Minas Gerais)

Fortaleza won 4–0 on aggregate and advanced to the round of 16.

=== Match 71 ===
20 April 2022
19:00

Tocantinópolis (Tocantins)	2–5	(Paraná (state)) Athletico Paranaense
Alan Maia 40'; Raí 48' (pen.)	Report	Marlos 9', 54'; Pablo 35'; Vitor Bueno 51', 66'

Estádio João Ribeiro, Tocantinópolis
Attendance: 5,594
Referee: Jean Pierre Gonçalves Lima (Rio Grande do Sul)

10 May 2022
21:30

Athletico Paranaense (Paraná (state))	4–0	(Tocantins) Tocantinópolis
Hugo Moura 26'; Khellven 40'; Pablo 44', 54'	Report

Arena da Baixada, Curitiba
Attendance: 10,984
Referee: Alexandre Vargas Tavares de Jesus (Rio de Janeiro)

Athletico Paranaense won 9–2 on aggregate and advanced to the round of 16.

=== Match 72 ===
30 April 2022
21:00

Palmeiras (São Paulo (state))	2–1	(Bahia) Juazeirense
Breno Lopes 12'; Gustavo Scarpa 68'	Report	Nildo Petrolina 4'

Arena Barueri, Barueri
Attendance: 14,960
Referee: Marcelo de Lima Henrique (Ceará)

11 May 2022
19:00

Juazeirense (Bahia)	1–2	(São Paulo (state)) Palmeiras
Nildo Petrolina 50'	Report	Danilo 41'; Raphael Veiga 81' (pen.)

Estádio do Café, Londrina
Attendance: 26,000
Referee: Bruno Arleu de Araújo (Rio de Janeiro)

Palmeiras won 4–2 on aggregate and advanced to the round of 16.

=== Match 73 ===
19 April 2022
19:00

CSA (Alagoas)	0–3	(Minas Gerais) América Mineiro
	Report	Éder 56'; Matheusinho 78'; Pedrinho 90'

Estádio Rei Pelé, Maceió
Attendance: 6,483
Referee: Leandro Pedro Vuaden (Rio Grande do Sul)

10 May 2022
19:00

América Mineiro (Minas Gerais)	2–0	(Alagoas) CSA
Ramírez 3'; Rodriguinho 83'	Report

Arena Independência, Belo Horizonte
Attendance: 1,898
Referee: Rafael Traci (Santa Catarina)

América Mineiro won 5–0 on aggregate and advanced to the round of 16.

=== Match 74 ===
19 April 2022
21:30

Remo (Pará)	2–1	(Minas Gerais) Cruzeiro
Willian Oliveira 70' (o.g.); Daniel Felipe 77'	Report	Rodolfo 65'

Baenão, Belém
Attendance: 12,577
Referee: Marcelo de Lima Henrique (Ceará)

12 May 2022
19:30

Cruzeiro (Minas Gerais)	1–0	(Pará) Remo
Edu 75'	Report
Penalties
Edu (penalty missed); Eduardo Brock (penalty scored); Rodolfo (penalty scored); Daniel Júnior (penalty scored); Rafael Silva (penalty missed); Zé Ivaldo (penalty missed); Oliveira (penalty scored); Rafael Santos (penalty scored)	5–4	(penalty missed) Marlon; (penalty scored) Bruno Alves; (penalty scored) Vanílson; (penalty missed) Leonan; (penalty scored) Paulinho Curuá; (penalty missed) Laílson; (penalty scored) Anderson Uchôa; (penalty missed) Everton Sena

Arena Independência, Belo Horizonte
Attendance: 22,158
Referee: Raphael Claus (São Paulo)

Tied 2–2 on aggregate, Cruzeiro won on penalties and advanced to the round of 16.

=== Match 75 ===
1 May 2022
18:00

Altos (Piauí)	1–2	(Rio de Janeiro (state)) Flamengo
Manoel 63'	Report	Pedro 64'; João Gomes 79'

Albertão, Teresina
Attendance: 30,460
Referee: Flávio Rodrigues de Souza (São Paulo)

11 May 2022
19:30

Flamengo (Rio de Janeiro (state))	2–0	(Piauí) Altos
Gabriel 58' (pen.); Victor Hugo 85'	Report

Estádio Raulino de Oliveira, Volta Redonda
Attendance: 13,077
Referee: Douglas Marques das Flores (São Paulo)

Flamengo won 4–1 on aggregate and advanced to the round of 16.

=== Match 76 ===
20 April 2022
19:30

Coritiba (Paraná (state))	1–0	(São Paulo (state)) Santos
Alef Manga 23'	Report

Estádio Couto Pereira, Curitiba
Attendance: 22,381
Referee: Bruno Arleu de Araújo (Rio de Janeiro)

12 May 2022
21:30

Santos (São Paulo (state))	3–0	(Paraná (state)) Coritiba
Marcos Leonardo 48'; Madson 61'; Fernández 63'	Report

Estádio Urbano Caldeira, Santos
Attendance: 13,692
Referee: Sávio Pereira Sampaio (Distrito Federal)

Santos won 3–1 on aggregate and advanced to the round of 16.
