= 2022 Copa do Brasil final rounds =

The 2022 Copa do Brasil final rounds were the final rounds (round of 16, quarter-finals, semi-finals and finals) of the 2022 Copa do Brasil football competition. They were played from 22 June to 19 October 2022. A total of 16 teams competed in the final rounds to decide the champions of the 2022 Copa do Brasil.

== Format ==
In the final rounds, each tie was played on a home-and-away two-legged basis. If the aggregate score was level, the second-leg match would go straight to the penalty shoot-out to determine the winners.

== Bracket ==
Round of 16
(Ceará) Fortaleza	2	0	2
Ceará	0	1	1
(Rio de Janeiro (state)) Fluminense	2	3	5
(Minas Gerais) Cruzeiro	1	0	1
(Goiás) Atlético Goianiense	0	3	3
Goiás	0	0	0
(São Paulo (state)) Corinthians	4	0	4
(São Paulo (state)) Santos	0	1	1
(São Paulo (state)) São Paulo (p)	1	1	2 (4)
(São Paulo (state)) Palmeiras	0	2	2 (3)
(Minas Gerais) América Mineiro	3	2	5
(Rio de Janeiro (state)) Botafogo	0	0	0
(Minas Gerais) Atlético Mineiro	2	0	2
(Rio de Janeiro (state)) Flamengo	1	2	3
Bahia	1	1	2
(Paraná (state)) Athletico Paranaense	2	2	4

Quarter-finals
(Ceará) Fortaleza	0	2	2
(Rio de Janeiro (state)) Fluminense	1	2	3
(Goiás) Atlético Goianiense	2	1	3
(São Paulo (state)) Corinthians	0	4	4
(São Paulo (state)) São Paulo	1	2	3
(Minas Gerais) América Mineiro	0	2	2
(Rio de Janeiro (state)) Flamengo	0	1	1
(Paraná (state)) Athletico Paranaense	0	0	0

Semi-finals
(Rio de Janeiro (state)) Fluminense	2	0	2
(São Paulo (state)) Corinthians	2	3	5
(São Paulo (state)) São Paulo	1	0	1
(Rio de Janeiro (state)) Flamengo	3	1	4

Finals
(São Paulo (state)) Corinthians	0	1	1 (5)
(Rio de Janeiro (state)) Flamengo (p)	0	1	1 (6)

== Round of 16 ==
=== Draw ===
The draw for the round of 16 was held on 7 June 2022, 15:00 at CBF headquarters in Rio de Janeiro. The 16 qualified teams were drawn in a single group (CBF ranking shown in parentheses).

Group
(Rio de Janeiro (state)) Flamengo (1); (São Paulo (state)) Palmeiras (2); (Minas Gerais) Atlético Mineiro (3); (Paraná (state)) Athletico Paranaense (5); (São Paulo (state)) Santos (6); (São Paulo (state)) São Paulo (7); (Rio de Janeiro (state)) Fluminense (9); (São Paulo (state)) Corinthians (10)	(Ceará) Fortaleza (11); Bahia (12); Ceará (13); (Minas Gerais) Cruzeiro (14); (Minas Gerais) América Mineiro (15); (Goiás) Atlético Goianiense (16); (Rio de Janeiro (state)) Botafogo (18); Goiás (23)

=== Matches ===
The first legs were played on 22–30 June and the second legs were played on 12–14 July 2022.

Team 1	Agg.	Team 2	1st leg	2nd leg
Corinthians (São Paulo (state))	4–1	(São Paulo (state)) Santos	4–0	0–1
São Paulo (São Paulo (state))	2–2 (4–3 p)	(São Paulo (state)) Palmeiras	1–0	1–2
Bahia	2–4	(Paraná (state)) Athletico Paranaense	1–2	1–2
Atlético Goianiense (Goiás)	3–0	Goiás	0–0	3–0
Fortaleza (Ceará)	2–1	Ceará	2–0	0–1
Fluminense (Rio de Janeiro (state))	5–1	(Minas Gerais) Cruzeiro	2–1	3–0
América Mineiro (Minas Gerais)	5–0	(Rio de Janeiro (state)) Botafogo	3–0	2–0
Atlético Mineiro (Minas Gerais)	2–3	(Rio de Janeiro (state)) Flamengo	2–1	0–2

All times are Brasília time, BRT (UTC−3)

==== Match 77 ====
22 June 2022
21:30

Corinthians (São Paulo (state))	4–0	(São Paulo (state)) Santos
Gustavo Mantuan 19'; Giuliano 27', 76'; Raul Gustavo 42'	Report

Neo Química Arena, São Paulo
Attendance: 40,316
Referee: Marcelo de Lima Henrique (Ceará)

13 July 2022
21:30

Santos (São Paulo (state))	1–0	(São Paulo (state)) Corinthians
Marcos Leonardo 67' (pen.)	Report

Estádio Urbano Caldeira, Santos
Attendance: 12,294
Referee: Jean Pierre Gonçalves Lima (Rio Grande do Sul)

Corinthians won 4–1 on aggregate and advanced to the quarter-finals.

==== Match 78 ====
23 June 2022
20:00

São Paulo (São Paulo (state))	1–0	(São Paulo (state)) Palmeiras
Patrick 30'	Report

Estádio do Morumbi, São Paulo
Attendance: 38,201
Referee: Raphael Claus (São Paulo)

14 July 2022
20:00

Palmeiras (São Paulo (state))	2–1	(São Paulo (state)) São Paulo
Piquerez 9'; Raphael Veiga 12'	Report	Luciano 69' (pen.)
Penalties
Raphael Veiga (penalty missed); Gustavo Scarpa (penalty scored); Gómez (penalty scored); Piquerez (penalty scored); Wesley (penalty missed)	3–4	(penalty missed) Luciano; (penalty scored) Calleri; (penalty scored) Nikão; (penalty scored) Igor Vinícius; (penalty scored) Igor Gomes

Allianz Parque, São Paulo
Attendance: 41,361
Referee: Leandro Pedro Vuaden (Rio Grande do Sul)

Tied 2–2 on aggregate, São Paulo won on penalties and advanced to the quarter-finals.

==== Match 79 ====
22 June 2022
19:30

Bahia	1–2	(Paraná (state)) Athletico Paranaense
Mugni 4'	Report	Christian 10'; Pedro Rocha 31'

Arena Fonte Nova, Salvador
Attendance: 20,235
Referee: Bráulio da Silva Machado (Santa Catarina)

12 July 2022
20:30

Athletico Paranaense (Paraná (state))	2–1	Bahia
Erick 78'; Rômulo Cardoso 90+3'	Report	Matheus Davó 5'

Arena da Baixada, Curitiba
Attendance: 25,486
Referee: Marcelo de Lima Henrique (Ceará)

Athletico Paranaense won 4–2 on aggregate and advanced to the quarter-finals.

==== Match 80 ====
22 June 2022
19:00

Atlético Goianiense (Goiás)	0–0	Goiás
	Report

Estádio Antônio Accioly, Goiânia
Attendance: 10,645
Referee: Flávio Rodrigues de Souza (São Paulo)

13 July 2022
19:00

Goiás	0–3	(Goiás) Atlético Goianiense
	Report	Jorginho 41'; Wellington Rato 52'; Marlon Freitas 64' (pen.)

Estádio da Serrinha, Goiânia
Attendance: 13,607
Referee: Luiz Flávio de Oliveira (São Paulo)

Atlético Goianiense won 3–0 on aggregate and advanced to the quarter-finals.

==== Match 81 ====
22 June 2022
20:00

Fortaleza (Ceará)	2–0	Ceará
Yago Pikachu 52', 84' (pen.)	Report

Castelão, Fortaleza
Attendance: 29,876
Referee: Wagner do Nascimento Magalhães (Rio de Janeiro)

13 July 2022
20:00

Ceará	1–0	(Ceará) Fortaleza
Vina 59'	Report

Castelão, Fortaleza
Attendance: 48,510
Referee: Anderson Daronco (Rio Grande do Sul)

Fortaleza won 2–1 on aggregate and advanced to the quarter-finals.

==== Match 82 ====
23 June 2022
19:00

Fluminense (Rio de Janeiro (state))	2–1	(Minas Gerais) Cruzeiro
Manoel 45'; Cano 55'	Report	Oliveira 45+6'

Maracanã, Rio de Janeiro
Attendance: 46,325
Referee: André Luiz de Freitas Castro (Goiás)

12 July 2022
21:00

Cruzeiro (Minas Gerais)	0–3	(Rio de Janeiro (state)) Fluminense
	Report	Arias 70'; Cano 84'; Nathan 90+2'

Mineirão, Belo Horizonte
Attendance: 58,844
Referee: Raphael Claus (São Paulo)

Fluminense won 5–1 on aggregate and advanced to the quarter-finals.

==== Match 83 ====
30 June 2022
19:00

América Mineiro (Minas Gerais)	3–0	(Rio de Janeiro (state)) Botafogo
Wellington Paulista 6'; Danilo Avelar 34'; Alê 58'	Report

Arena Independência, Belo Horizonte
Attendance: 3,861
Referee: Jean Pierre Gonçalves Lima (Rio Grande do Sul)

14 July 2022
21:00

Botafogo (Rio de Janeiro (state))	0–2	(Minas Gerais) América Mineiro
	Report	Felipe Azevedo 21'; Pedrinho 61'

Estádio Olímpico Nilton Santos, Rio de Janeiro
Attendance: 13,862
Referee: Bráulio da Silva Machado (Santa Catarina)

América Mineiro won 5–0 on aggregate and advanced to the quarter-finals.

==== Match 84 ====
22 June 2022
21:30

Atlético Mineiro (Minas Gerais)	2–1	(Rio de Janeiro (state)) Flamengo
Hulk 6'; Ademir 54'	Report	Lázaro 79'

Mineirão, Belo Horizonte
Attendance: 53,953
Referee: Luiz Flávio de Oliveira (São Paulo)

13 July 2022
21:30

Flamengo (Rio de Janeiro (state))	2–0	(Minas Gerais) Atlético Mineiro
De Arrascaeta 45+1', 65'	Report

Maracanã, Rio de Janeiro
Attendance: 68,747
Referee: Wilton Sampaio (Goiás)

Flamengo won 3–2 on aggregate and advanced to the quarter-finals.

== Quarter-finals ==
=== Draw ===
The draw for the quarter-finals was held on 19 July 2022, 13:30 at CBF headquarters in Rio de Janeiro. All teams were placed into a single group (CBF ranking shown in parentheses).

Group
- (Rio de Janeiro (state)) Flamengo (1)
- (Paraná (state)) Athletico Paranaense (5)
- (São Paulo (state)) São Paulo (7)
- (Rio de Janeiro (state)) Fluminense (9)
- (São Paulo (state)) Corinthians (10)
- (Ceará) Fortaleza (11)
- (Minas Gerais) América Mineiro (15)
- (Goiás) Atlético Goianiense (16)

=== Matches ===
The first legs were played on 27–28 July and the second legs were played on 17–18 August 2022.

Team 1	Agg.	Team 2	1st leg	2nd leg
Atlético Goianiense (Goiás)	3–4	(São Paulo (state)) Corinthians	2–0	1–4
Fortaleza (Ceará)	2–3	(Rio de Janeiro (state)) Fluminense	0–1	2–2
São Paulo (São Paulo (state))	3–2	(Minas Gerais) América Mineiro	1–0	2–2
Flamengo (Rio de Janeiro (state))	1–0	(Paraná (state)) Athletico Paranaense	0–0	1–0

All times are Brasília time, BRT (UTC−3)

==== Match 85 ====
27 July 2022
21:30

Atlético Goianiense (Goiás)	2–0	(São Paulo (state)) Corinthians
Jorginho 22'; Léo Pereira 87'	Report

Estádio Antônio Accioly, Goiânia
Attendance: 12,089
Referee: Marcelo de Lima Henrique (Ceará)

17 August 2022
21:30

Corinthians (São Paulo (state))	4–1	(Goiás) Atlético Goianiense
Gil 41'; Yuri Alberto 49', 56', 71'	Report	Wellington Rato 86'

Neo Química Arena, São Paulo
Attendance: 42,837
Referee: Bruno Arleu de Araújo (Rio de Janeiro)

Corinthians won 4–3 on aggregate and advanced to the semi-finals.

==== Match 86 ====
28 July 2022
20:30

Fortaleza (Ceará)	0–1	(Rio de Janeiro (state)) Fluminense
	Report	Nonato 34'

Castelão, Fortaleza
Attendance: 29,898
Referee: Raphael Claus (São Paulo)

17 August 2022
20:00

Fluminense (Rio de Janeiro (state))	2–2	(Ceará) Fortaleza
Ganso 64' (pen.); Cano 73'	Report	Nino 13' (o.g.); Romero 45'

Maracanã, Rio de Janeiro
Attendance: 60,833
Referee: Wilton Sampaio (Goiás)

Fluminense won 3–2 on aggregate and advanced to the semi-finals.

==== Match 87 ====
28 July 2022
20:00

São Paulo (São Paulo (state))	1–0	(Minas Gerais) América Mineiro
Luciano 34'	Report

Estádio do Morumbi, São Paulo
Attendance: 51,297
Referee: Wilton Sampaio (Goiás)

18 August 2022
21:00

América Mineiro (Minas Gerais)	2–2	(São Paulo (state)) São Paulo
Wellington Paulista 43' (pen.); Everaldo 65'	Report	Luciano 22', 29'

Arena Independência, Belo Horizonte
Attendance: 10,450
Referee: Bráulio da Silva Machado (Santa Catarina)

São Paulo won 3–2 on aggregate and advanced to the semi-finals.

==== Match 88 ====
27 July 2022
21:30

Flamengo (Rio de Janeiro (state))	0–0	(Paraná (state)) Athletico Paranaense
	Report

Maracanã, Rio de Janeiro
Attendance: 65,271
Referee: Luiz Flávio de Oliveira (São Paulo)

17 August 2022
21:30

Athletico Paranaense (Paraná (state))	0–1	(Rio de Janeiro (state)) Flamengo
	Report	Pedro 57'

Arena da Baixada, Curitiba
Attendance: 38,054
Referee: Raphael Claus (São Paulo)

Flamengo won 1–0 on aggregate and advanced to the semi-finals.

== Semi-finals ==
=== Draw ===
The draw to determine the home-and-away teams for both legs was held on 19 August 2022, 11:00 at CBF headquarters in Rio de Janeiro.

=== Matches ===
The first legs were played on 24 August and the second legs were played on 14–15 September 2022.

Team 1	Agg.	Team 2	1st leg	2nd leg
Fluminense (Rio de Janeiro (state))	2–5	(São Paulo (state)) Corinthians	2–2	0–3
São Paulo (São Paulo (state))	1–4	(Rio de Janeiro (state)) Flamengo	1–3	0–1

All times are Brasília time, BRT (UTC−3)

==== Match 89 ====
24 August 2022
19:30

Fluminense (Rio de Janeiro (state))	2–2	(São Paulo (state)) Corinthians
Ganso 3' (pen.); Arias 46'	Report	Renato Augusto 22'; Róger Guedes 89'

Maracanã, Rio de Janeiro
Attendance: 58,203
Referee: Ramon Abatti Abel (Santa Catarina)

15 September 2022
20:00

Corinthians (São Paulo (state))	3–0	(Rio de Janeiro (state)) Fluminense
Renato Augusto 33'; Giuliano 90'; Felipe Melo 90+3' (o.g.)	Report

Neo Química Arena, São Paulo
Attendance: 45,558
Referee: Anderson Daronco (Rio Grande do Sul)

Corinthians won 5–2 on aggregate and advanced to the finals.

==== Match 90 ====
24 August 2022
21:30

São Paulo (São Paulo (state))	1–3	(Rio de Janeiro (state)) Flamengo
Rodrigo Nestor 78'	Report	João Gomes 12'; Gabriel 67'; Everton 90+3'

Estádio do Morumbi, São Paulo
Attendance: 51,365
Referee: Anderson Daronco (Rio Grande do Sul)

14 September 2022
21:45

Flamengo (Rio de Janeiro (state))	1–0	(São Paulo (state)) São Paulo
De Arrascaeta 35'	Report

Maracanã, Rio de Janeiro
Attendance: 62,977
Referee: Wilton Sampaio (Goiás)

Flamengo won 4–1 on aggregate and advanced to the finals.

== Finals ==
=== Draw ===
The draw to determine the home-and-away teams for both legs was held on 20 September 2022, 11:00 at CBF headquarters in Rio de Janeiro.

=== Matches ===
The first leg was played on 12 October and the second leg was played on 19 October 2022.

Team 1	Agg.	Team 2	1st leg	2nd leg
Corinthians (São Paulo (state))	1–1 (5–6 p)	(Rio de Janeiro (state)) Flamengo	0–0	1–1

All times are Brasília time, BRT (UTC−3)

==== Match 91 ====
12 October 2022
21:45

Corinthians (São Paulo (state))	0–0	(Rio de Janeiro (state)) Flamengo
	Report

Neo Química Arena, São Paulo
Attendance: 47,031
Referee: Bráulio da Silva Machado (Santa Catarina)

19 October 2022
21:45

Flamengo (Rio de Janeiro (state))	1–1	(São Paulo (state)) Corinthians
Pedro 7'	Report	Giuliano 82'
Penalties
Filipe Luís (penalty missed); David Luiz (penalty scored); Léo Pereira (penalty scored); Éverton Ribeiro (penalty scored); Gabriel (penalty scored); Everton (penalty scored); Rodinei (penalty scored)	6–5	(penalty scored) Fábio Santos; (penalty scored) Giuliano; (penalty scored) Renato Augusto; (penalty missed) Fagner; (penalty scored) Yuri Alberto; (penalty scored) Maycon; (penalty missed) Mateus Vital

Maracanã, Rio de Janeiro
Attendance: 68,097
Referee: Wilton Sampaio (Goiás)
