= 2022 Copa do Brasil =

Tournament details
- Country: Brazil
- Dates: 22 February – 19 October
- Teams: 92

Final positions
- Champions: Flamengo (4th title)
- Runner-up: Corinthians
- 2023 Copa Libertadores: Flamengo

Tournament statistics
- Matches played: 122
- Goals scored: 281 (2.3 per match)
- Top goal scorer(s): Germán Cano; Giuliano (5 goals each)

Awards
- Best player: Giorgian de Arrascaeta (Flamengo)

The 2022 Copa do Brasil (officially the Copa Intelbras do Brasil 2022 for sponsorship reasons) was the 34th edition of the Copa do Brasil football competition. It was held between 22 February and 19 October 2022.

The competition was contested by 92 teams, either qualified by participating in their respective state championships (70), by the 2022 CBF ranking (10), by the 2021 Copa do Nordeste (1), by the 2021 Copa Verde (1), by the 2021 Série B (1) or those qualified for 2022 Copa Libertadores (9). Atlético Mineiro were the defending champions but they were eliminated in the Round of 16.

Tied 1–1 on aggregate, Flamengo defeated Corinthians 6–5 on penalties in the finals to win their fourth title. As champions, Flamengo qualified for the 2023 Copa Libertadores group stage and 2023 Supercopa do Brasil.

Giorgian de Arrascaeta (Flamengo) and Cássio (Corinthians) won best player and best goalkeeper awards, respectively.

== Qualified teams ==
Teams in bold were qualified directly for the third round.

Association	Team	Qualification method
(Acre (state)) Acre; 2 berths	Rio Branco	2021 Campeonato Acriano champions
(Acre (state)) Acre; 2 berths	Humaitá	2021 Campeonato Acriano runners-up
(Alagoas) Alagoas; 3 berths	CSA	2021 Campeonato Alagoano champions
(Alagoas) Alagoas; 3 berths	CRB	2021 Campeonato Alagoano runners-up
(Alagoas) Alagoas; 3 berths	ASA	2022 Copa do Brasil play-off winners
(Amapá) Amapá; 1 berth	Trem	2021 Campeonato Amapaense champions
(Amazonas (Brazilian state)) Amazonas; 2 berths	Manaus	2021 Campeonato Amazonense champions
(Amazonas (Brazilian state)) Amazonas; 2 berths	São Raimundo	2021 Campeonato Amazonense runners-up
(Bahia) Bahia; 3 + 1 + 1 berths	**Bahia**	**2021 Copa do Nordeste champions**
(Bahia) Bahia; 3 + 1 + 1 berths	Atlético de Alagoinhas	2021 Campeonato Baiano champions
(Bahia) Bahia; 3 + 1 + 1 berths	Bahia de Feira	2021 Campeonato Baiano runners-up
(Bahia) Bahia; 3 + 1 + 1 berths	Juazeirense	2021 Campeonato Baiano 3rd place
(Bahia) Bahia; 3 + 1 + 1 berths	Vitória	3rd best placed team in the 2021 CBF ranking not already qualified
(Ceará) Ceará; 3 + 1 berths	**Fortaleza**	**2021 Campeonato Brasileiro Série A 4th place**
(Ceará) Ceará; 3 + 1 berths	Ceará	2021 Campeonato Cearense runners-up
(Ceará) Ceará; 3 + 1 berths	Ferroviário	2021 Campeonato Cearense first round winners
(Ceará) Ceará; 3 + 1 berths	Icasa	2021 Copa Fares Lopes champions
(Espírito Santo) Espírito Santo; 2 berths	Real Noroeste	2021 Campeonato Capixaba champions
(Espírito Santo) Espírito Santo; 2 berths	Nova Venécia	2021 Copa Espírito Santo champions
(Federal District (Brazil)) Federal District; 2 berths	Brasiliense	2021 Campeonato Brasiliense champions
(Federal District (Brazil)) Federal District; 2 berths	Ceilândia	2021 Campeonato Brasiliense runners-up
(Goiás) Goiás; 3 + 1 berths	Grêmio Anápolis	2021 Campeonato Goiano champions
(Goiás) Goiás; 3 + 1 berths	Vila Nova	2021 Campeonato Goiano runners-up
(Goiás) Goiás; 3 + 1 berths	Atlético Goianiense	2021 Campeonato Goiano 3rd place
(Goiás) Goiás; 3 + 1 berths	Goiás	2nd best placed team in the 2021 CBF ranking not already qualified
(Maranhão) Maranhão; 3 berths	Sampaio Corrêa	2021 Campeonato Maranhense champions
(Maranhão) Maranhão; 3 berths	Moto Club	2021 Campeonato Maranhense runners-up
(Maranhão) Maranhão; 3 berths	Tuntum	2021 Copa Federação Maranhense de Futebol champions
(Mato Grosso) Mato Grosso; 3 berths	Cuiabá	2021 Campeonato Mato-Grossense champions
(Mato Grosso) Mato Grosso; 3 berths	CEOV	2021 Campeonato Mato-Grossense runners-up
(Mato Grosso) Mato Grosso; 3 berths	União Rondonópolis	2021 Copa FMF winners
Mato Grosso do Sul 1 berth	Costa Rica	2021 Campeonato Sul-Mato-Grossense champions
(Minas Gerais) Minas Gerais; 4 + 2 berths	**Atlético Mineiro**	**2021 Copa do Brasil champions**
(Minas Gerais) Minas Gerais; 4 + 2 berths	**América Mineiro**	**2021 Campeonato Brasileiro Série A 8th place**
(Minas Gerais) Minas Gerais; 4 + 2 berths	Tombense	2021 Campeonato Mineiro 3rd place
(Minas Gerais) Minas Gerais; 4 + 2 berths	Cruzeiro	2021 Campeonato Mineiro 4th place
(Minas Gerais) Minas Gerais; 4 + 2 berths	Pouso Alegre	2021 Troféu Inconfidência champions
(Minas Gerais) Minas Gerais; 4 + 2 berths	URT	2021 Troféu Inconfidência runners-up
(Pará) Pará; 3 + 1 berths	**Remo**	**2021 Copa Verde champions**
(Pará) Pará; 3 + 1 berths	Paysandu	2021 Campeonato Paraense champions
(Pará) Pará; 3 + 1 berths	Tuna Luso	2021 Campeonato Paraense runners-up
(Pará) Pará; 3 + 1 berths	Castanhal	2021 Campeonato Paraense 4th place
(Paraíba) Paraíba; 2 berths	Campinense	2021 Campeonato Paraibano champions
(Paraíba) Paraíba; 2 berths	Sousa	2021 Campeonato Paraibano runners-up
(Paraná (state)) Paraná; 4 + 1 + 2 berths	**Athletico Paranaense**	**2021 Copa Sudamericana champions**
(Paraná (state)) Paraná; 4 + 1 + 2 berths	Londrina	2021 Campeonato Paranaense champions
(Paraná (state)) Paraná; 4 + 1 + 2 berths	FC Cascavel	2021 Campeonato Paranaense runners-up
(Paraná (state)) Paraná; 4 + 1 + 2 berths	Operário Ferroviário	2021 Campeonato Paranaense 3rd place
(Paraná (state)) Paraná; 4 + 1 + 2 berths	Azuriz	2021 Campeonato Paranaense 5th place
(Paraná (state)) Paraná; 4 + 1 + 2 berths	Coritiba	4th best placed team in the 2021 CBF ranking not already qualified
(Paraná (state)) Paraná; 4 + 1 + 2 berths	Paraná	6th best placed team in the 2021 CBF ranking not already qualified
(Pernambuco) Pernambuco; 3 berths	Náutico	2021 Campeonato Pernambucano champions
(Pernambuco) Pernambuco; 3 berths	Sport	2021 Campeonato Pernambucano runners-up
(Pernambuco) Pernambuco; 3 berths	Salgueiro	2021 Campeonato Pernambucano first round best placed team not already qualified
(Piauí) Piauí; 2 berths	Altos	2021 Campeonato Piauiense champions
(Piauí) Piauí; 2 berths	Fluminense	2021 Campeonato Piauiense runners-up
(Rio de Janeiro (state)) Rio de Janeiro; 5 + 3 berths	**Flamengo**	**2021 Campeonato Brasileiro Série A runners-up**
(Rio de Janeiro (state)) Rio de Janeiro; 5 + 3 berths	**Fluminense**	**2021 Campeonato Brasileiro Série A 7th place**
(Rio de Janeiro (state)) Rio de Janeiro; 5 + 3 berths	**Botafogo**	**2021 Campeonato Brasileiro Série B champions**
(Rio de Janeiro (state)) Rio de Janeiro; 5 + 3 berths	Portuguesa	2021 Campeonato Carioca 3rd place
(Rio de Janeiro (state)) Rio de Janeiro; 5 + 3 berths	Volta Redonda	2021 Campeonato Carioca 4th place
(Rio de Janeiro (state)) Rio de Janeiro; 5 + 3 berths	Vasco da Gama	2021 Taça Rio champions
(Rio de Janeiro (state)) Rio de Janeiro; 5 + 3 berths	Nova Iguaçu	2021 Campeonato Carioca 7th place
(Rio de Janeiro (state)) Rio de Janeiro; 5 + 3 berths	Maricá	2021 Copa Rio runners-up
Rio Grande do Norte 2 berths	Globo	2021 Campeonato Potiguar champions
Rio Grande do Norte 2 berths	ABC	2021 Campeonato Potiguar runners-up
(Rio Grande do Sul) Rio Grande do Sul; 4 + 1 berths	Grêmio	2021 Campeonato Gaúcho champions
(Rio Grande do Sul) Rio Grande do Sul; 4 + 1 berths	Internacional	2021 Campeonato Gaúcho runners-up
(Rio Grande do Sul) Rio Grande do Sul; 4 + 1 berths	Juventude	2021 Campeonato Gaúcho 3rd place
(Rio Grande do Sul) Rio Grande do Sul; 4 + 1 berths	Glória	2021 Copa FGF champions
(Rio Grande do Sul) Rio Grande do Sul; 4 + 1 berths	Brasil de Pelotas	9th best placed team in the 2021 CBF ranking not already qualified
(Rondônia) Rondônia; 1 berth	Porto Velho	2021 Campeonato Rondoniense champions
(Roraima) Roraima; 1 berth	São Raimundo	2021 Campeonato Roraimense champions
(Santa Catarina (state)) Santa Catarina; 3 + 1 berths	Avaí	2021 Campeonato Catarinense champions
(Santa Catarina (state)) Santa Catarina; 3 + 1 berths	Chapecoense	2021 Campeonato Catarinense runners-up
(Santa Catarina (state)) Santa Catarina; 3 + 1 berths	Figueirense	2021 Copa Santa Catarina champions
(Santa Catarina (state)) Santa Catarina; 3 + 1 berths	Criciúma	8th best placed team in the 2021 CBF ranking not already qualified
(São Paulo (state)) São Paulo; 5 + 3 + 4 berths	**Palmeiras**	**2021 Copa Libertadores champions**
(São Paulo (state)) São Paulo; 5 + 3 + 4 berths	**Corinthians**	**2021 Campeonato Brasileiro Série A 5th place**
(São Paulo (state)) São Paulo; 5 + 3 + 4 berths	**Red Bull Bragantino**	**2021 Campeonato Brasileiro Série A 6th place**
(São Paulo (state)) São Paulo; 5 + 3 + 4 berths	São Paulo	2021 Campeonato Paulista champions
(São Paulo (state)) São Paulo; 5 + 3 + 4 berths	Mirassol	2021 Campeonato Paulista 4th place
(São Paulo (state)) São Paulo; 5 + 3 + 4 berths	Ferroviária	2021 Campeonato Paulista 6th place
(São Paulo (state)) São Paulo; 5 + 3 + 4 berths	Novorizontino	2021 Troféu do Interior champions
(São Paulo (state)) São Paulo; 5 + 3 + 4 berths	Botafogo	2021 Copa Paulista runners-up
(São Paulo (state)) São Paulo; 5 + 3 + 4 berths	Santos	Best placed team in the 2021 CBF ranking not already qualified
(São Paulo (state)) São Paulo; 5 + 3 + 4 berths	Ponte Preta	5th best placed team in the 2021 CBF ranking not already qualified
(São Paulo (state)) São Paulo; 5 + 3 + 4 berths	Guarani	7th best placed team in the 2021 CBF ranking not already qualified
(São Paulo (state)) São Paulo; 5 + 3 + 4 berths	Oeste	10th best placed team in the 2021 CBF ranking not already qualified
(Sergipe) Sergipe; 2 berths	Sergipe	2021 Campeonato Sergipano champions
(Sergipe) Sergipe; 2 berths	Lagarto	2021 Campeonato Sergipano runners-up
(Tocantins) Tocantins; 1 berth	Tocantinópolis	2021 Campeonato Tocantinense champions

== Format ==
The competition is a single-elimination tournament, the first two rounds are played as a single match and the rest are played as a two-legged ties. Twelve teams enter in the third round, which are teams qualified for 2022 Copa Libertadores (9), Série B champions, Copa Verde champions and Copa do Nordeste champions. The remaining 80 teams play in the first round, the 40 winners play the second round, and the 20 winners play the third round. Finally, the sixteen third round winners advance to the round of 16.

== Schedule ==
The schedule of the competition was as follows:

Stage	First leg	Second leg
First round	Week 1: 23 February; Week 2: 2 March	
Second round	Week 1: 9 March; Week 2: 16 March; Week 3: 23 March	
Third round	Week 1: 20 April; Week 2: 30 April	Week 1: 11 May; Week 2: 21 May; Week 3: 31 May
Round of 16	Week 1: 22 June; Week 2: 29 June	13 July
Quarter-finals	27 July	17 August
Semi-finals	24 August	14 September
Finals	12 October	19 October

== Draw ==
The draw for the first and second rounds was held on 17 January 2022, 13:00 at CBF headquarters in Rio de Janeiro. Teams were seeded by their CBF ranking (shown in parentheses). The 80 qualified teams were divided in eight groups (A-H) with 10 teams each. The matches were drawn from the respective confronts: A vs. E; B vs. F; C vs. G; D vs. H. The lower-ranked teams hosted the first round match.

Group A	Group B	Group C	Group D
(Rio Grande do Sul) Grêmio (4); (São Paulo (state)) Santos (6); (São Paulo (state)) São Paulo (7); (Rio Grande do Sul) Internacional (8); Ceará (13); (Minas Gerais) Cruzeiro (14); (Goiás) Atlético Goianiense (16); (Santa Catarina (state)) Chapecoense (17); (Rio de Janeiro (state)) Vasco da Gama (19); (Pernambuco) Sport (21)	(Mato Grosso) Cuiabá (22); Goiás (23); (Rio Grande do Sul) Juventude (24); (Bahia) Vitória (25); (Paraná (state)) Coritiba (26); (Santa Catarina (state)) Avaí (27); (Alagoas) CRB (28); (São Paulo (state)) Ponte Preta (29); (Alagoas) CSA (30); (Goiás) Vila Nova (31)	(Maranhão) Sampaio Corrêa (32); (Paraná (state)) Paraná (33); (Paraná (state)) Operário Ferroviário (34); (São Paulo (state)) Guarani (35); (Santa Catarina (state)) Criciúma (36); (Rio Grande do Sul) Brasil de Pelotas (37); (Pernambuco) Náutico (38); (Paraná (state)) Londrina (39); (Pará) Paysandu (40); (Santa Catarina (state)) Figueirense (41)	(São Paulo (state)) Oeste (43); (Rio Grande do Norte) ABC (47); (São Paulo (state)) Botafogo (48); (Minas Gerais) Tombense (49); (Ceará) Ferroviário (52); (Rio de Janeiro (state)) Volta Redonda (53); (Amazonas (Brazilian state)) Manaus (55); (Bahia) Juazeirense (59); (Federal District (Brazil)) Brasiliense (63); (São Paulo (state)) Novorizontino (64)
Group E	Group F	Group G	Group H
(Piauí) Altos (66); (São Paulo (state)) Mirassol (70); (Paraíba) Campinense (72); (Maranhão) Moto Club (74); (Roraima) São Raimundo (78); (São Paulo (state)) Ferroviária (79); (Pernambuco) Salgueiro (81); (Rio Grande do Norte) Globo (82); (Mato Grosso) União Rondonópolis (83); Sergipe (90)	(Alagoas) ASA (91); (Paraná (state)) FC Cascavel (92); Bahia de Feira (93); (Bahia) Atlético de Alagoinhas (97); (Acre (state)) Rio Branco (98); (Minas Gerais) URT (118); (Rio de Janeiro (state)) Portuguesa (122); (Pará) Castanhal (123); (Rondônia) Porto Velho (131); (Paraíba) Sousa (143)	(Tocantins) Tocantinópolis (146); (Mato Grosso) CEOV (151); (Federal District (Brazil)) Ceilândia (169); (Espírito Santo) Real Noroeste (170); (Rio de Janeiro (state)) Nova Iguaçu (197); (Sergipe) Lagarto (214); (Amapá) Trem (228); (Rio de Janeiro (state)) Maricá (no rank); (Rio Grande do Sul) Glória (no rank); (Minas Gerais) Pouso Alegre (no rank)	(Paraná (state)) Azuriz (no rank); (Ceará) Icasa (no rank); (Goiás) Grêmio Anápolis (no rank); (Pará) Tuna Luso (no rank); (Maranhão) Tuntum (no rank); (Amazonas (Brazilian state)) São Raimundo (no rank); (Piauí) Fluminense (no rank); (Acre (state)) Humaitá (no rank); (Espírito Santo) Nova Venécia (no rank); (Mato Grosso do Sul) Costa Rica (no rank)

== First round ==
In the first round, each tie was played on a single-legged basis. The lower-ranked team hosted the match. If tied after 90 minutes, the higher-ranked team would automatically advance to second round.

Team 1	Score	Team 2
Moto Club (Maranhão)	3–2	(Santa Catarina (state)) Chapecoense
Icasa (Ceará)	0–0	(Minas Gerais) Tombense
Bahia de Feira	2–5	(Paraná (state)) Coritiba
Pouso Alegre (Minas Gerais)	2–0	(Paraná (state)) Paraná
Mirassol (São Paulo (state))	3–2	(Rio Grande do Sul) Grêmio
Azuriz (Paraná (state))	1–0	(São Paulo (state)) Botafogo
URT (Minas Gerais)	1–1	(Santa Catarina (state)) Avaí
Ceilândia (Federal District (Brazil))	2–0	(Paraná (state)) Londrina
União Rondonópolis (Mato Grosso)	0–3	(Goiás) Atlético Goianiense
Nova Venécia (Espírito Santo)	2–1	(Ceará) Ferroviário
Porto Velho (Rondônia)	1–2	(Rio Grande do Sul) Juventude
Real Noroeste (Espírito Santo)	2–1	(Paraná (state)) Operário Ferroviário
Ferroviária (São Paulo (state))	0–1	(Rio de Janeiro (state)) Vasco da Gama
Grêmio Anápolis (Goiás)	0–0	(Bahia) Juazeirense
Atlético de Alagoinhas (Bahia)	1–1	(Alagoas) CSA
Trem (Amapá)	0–3	(Pará) Paysandu
São Raimundo (Roraima)	0–3	Ceará
Tuna Luso (Pará)	1–0	(São Paulo (state)) Novorizontino
ASA (Alagoas)	0–2	(Mato Grosso) Cuiabá
Lagarto (Sergipe)	0–0	(Santa Catarina (state)) Figueirense
Altos (Piauí)	1–0	(Pernambuco) Sport
Costa Rica (Mato Grosso do Sul)	0–3	(Rio Grande do Norte) ABC
Sousa (Paraíba)	1–1	Goiás
Nova Iguaçu (Rio de Janeiro (state))	0–0	(Santa Catarina (state)) Criciúma
Globo (Rio Grande do Norte)	2–0	(Rio Grande do Sul) Internacional
Humaitá (Acre (state))	2–2	(Federal District (Brazil)) Brasiliense
Rio Branco (Acre (state))	0–0	(Goiás) Vila Nova
Maricá (Rio de Janeiro (state))	0–1	(São Paulo (state)) Guarani
Sergipe	0–5	(Minas Gerais) Cruzeiro
Tuntum (Maranhão)	4–2	(Rio de Janeiro (state)) Volta Redonda
Portuguesa (Rio de Janeiro (state))	1–0	(Alagoas) CRB
CEOV (Mato Grosso)	1–2	(Maranhão) Sampaio Corrêa
Campinense (Paraíba)	0–0	(São Paulo (state)) São Paulo
São Raimundo (Amazonas (Brazilian state))	0–1	(Amazonas (Brazilian state)) Manaus
FC Cascavel (Paraná (state))	1–0	(São Paulo (state)) Ponte Preta
Tocantinópolis (Tocantins)	1–0	(Pernambuco) Náutico
Salgueiro (Pernambuco)	0–3	(São Paulo (state)) Santos
Fluminense (Piauí)	2–0	(São Paulo (state)) Oeste
Castanhal (Pará)	1–1	(Bahia) Vitória
Glória (Rio Grande do Sul)	1–0	(Rio Grande do Sul) Brasil de Pelotas

== Second round ==
In the second round, each tie was played on a single-legged basis. If the score was level, the match would go straight to the penalty shoot-out to determine the winners.

Team 1	Score	Team 2
Moto Club (Maranhão)	1–1 (2–4 p)	(Minas Gerais) Tombense
Pouso Alegre (Minas Gerais)	1–1 (2–3 p)	(Paraná (state)) Coritiba
Azuriz (Paraná (state))	1–0	(São Paulo (state)) Mirassol
Avaí (Santa Catarina (state))	1–2	(Federal District (Brazil)) Ceilândia
Atlético Goianiense (Goiás)	2–1	(Espírito Santo) Nova Venécia
Real Noroeste (Espírito Santo)	0–1	(Rio Grande do Sul) Juventude
Juazeirense (Bahia)	1–1 (4–2 p)	(Rio de Janeiro (state)) Vasco da Gama
CSA (Alagoas)	4–1	(Pará) Paysandu
Ceará	2–0	(Pará) Tuna Luso
Figueirense (Santa Catarina (state))	2–2 (2–4 p)	(Mato Grosso) Cuiabá
ABC (Rio Grande do Norte)	1–1 (2–4 p)	(Piauí) Altos
Goiás	1–0	(Santa Catarina (state)) Criciúma
Globo (Rio Grande do Norte)	1–1 (1–4 p)	(Federal District (Brazil)) Brasiliense
Guarani (São Paulo (state))	2–2 (4–5 p)	(Goiás) Vila Nova
Tuntum (Maranhão)	0–3	(Minas Gerais) Cruzeiro
Portuguesa (Rio de Janeiro (state))	2–0	(Maranhão) Sampaio Corrêa
São Paulo (São Paulo (state))	2–0	(Amazonas (Brazilian state)) Manaus
Tocantinópolis (Tocantins)	2–0	(Paraná (state)) FC Cascavel
Fluminense (Piauí)	1–1 (4–5 p)	(São Paulo (state)) Santos
Vitória (Bahia)	2–0	(Rio Grande do Sul) Glória

== Third round ==
The draw for the third round was held on 28 March 2022, 15:00 at CBF headquarters in Rio de Janeiro. In a first draw, the 32 teams, seeded by their CBF ranking, were drawn into 16 ties. The home and away teams of each leg were decided in a second draw. CBF ranking is shown in parentheses.

Pot A	Pot B
(Rio de Janeiro (state)) Flamengo (1); (São Paulo (state)) Palmeiras (2); (Minas Gerais) Atlético Mineiro (3); (Paraná (state)) Athletico Paranaense (5); (São Paulo (state)) Santos (6); (São Paulo (state)) São Paulo (7); (Rio de Janeiro (state)) Fluminense (9); (São Paulo (state)) Corinthians (10); (Ceará) Fortaleza (11); Bahia (12); Ceará (13); (Minas Gerais) Cruzeiro (14); (Minas Gerais) América Mineiro (15); (Goiás) Atlético Goianiense (16); (Rio de Janeiro (state)) Botafogo (18); (São Paulo (state)) Red Bull Bragantino (20)	(Mato Grosso) Cuiabá (22); Goiás (23); (Rio Grande do Sul) Juventude (24); (Bahia) Vitória (25); (Paraná (state)) Coritiba (26); (Alagoas) CSA (30); (Goiás) Vila Nova (31); (Pará) Remo (42); (Minas Gerais) Tombense (49); (Bahia) Juazeirense (59); (Federal District (Brazil)) Brasiliense (63); (Piauí) Altos (66); (Rio de Janeiro (state)) Portuguesa (122); (Tocantins) Tocantinópolis (146); (Federal District (Brazil)) Ceilândia (169); (Paraná (state)) Azuriz (no rank)

In the third round, each tie was played on a home-and-away two-legged basis. If the aggregate score was level, the second-leg match would go straight to the penalty shoot-out to determine the winners.

Team 1	Agg.	Team 2	1st leg	2nd leg
Goiás	2–2 (9–8 p)	(São Paulo (state)) Red Bull Bragantino	1–2	1–0
Atlético Goianiense (Goiás)	1–1 (5–3 p)	(Mato Grosso) Cuiabá	1–1	0–0
Tombense (Minas Gerais)	0–4	Ceará	0–2	0–2
Fluminense (Rio de Janeiro (state))	5–2	(Goiás) Vila Nova	3–2	2–0
Bahia	1–1 (4–3 p)	(Paraná (state)) Azuriz	0–0	1–1
Juventude (Rio Grande do Sul)	2–4	(São Paulo (state)) São Paulo	2–2	0–2
Portuguesa (Rio de Janeiro (state))	1–3	(São Paulo (state)) Corinthians	1–1	0–2
Ceilândia (Federal District (Brazil))	0–6	(Rio de Janeiro (state)) Botafogo	0–3	0–3
Atlético Mineiro (Minas Gerais)	4–0	(Federal District (Brazil)) Brasiliense	3–0	1–0
Fortaleza (Ceará)	4–0	(Bahia) Vitória	3–0	1–0
Tocantinópolis (Tocantins)	2–9	(Paraná (state)) Athletico Paranaense	2–5	0–4
Palmeiras (São Paulo (state))	4–2	(Bahia) Juazeirense	2–1	2–1
CSA (Alagoas)	0–5	(Minas Gerais) América Mineiro	0–3	0–2
Remo (Pará)	2–2 (4–5 p)	(Minas Gerais) Cruzeiro	2–1	0–1
Altos (Piauí)	1–4	(Rio de Janeiro (state)) Flamengo	1–2	0–2
Coritiba (Paraná (state))	1–3	(São Paulo (state)) Santos	1–0	0–3

== Final rounds ==
In the final rounds, each tie was played on a home-and-away two-legged basis. If the aggregate score was level, the second-leg match would go straight to the penalty shoot-out to determine the winners.

=== Bracket ===
Round of 16
(Ceará) Fortaleza	2	0	2
Ceará	0	1	1
(Rio de Janeiro (state)) Fluminense	2	3	5
(Minas Gerais) Cruzeiro	1	0	1
(Goiás) Atlético Goianiense	0	3	3
Goiás	0	0	0
(São Paulo (state)) Corinthians	4	0	4
(São Paulo (state)) Santos	0	1	1
(São Paulo (state)) São Paulo (p)	1	1	2 (4)
(São Paulo (state)) Palmeiras	0	2	2 (3)
(Minas Gerais) América Mineiro	3	2	5
(Rio de Janeiro (state)) Botafogo	0	0	0
(Minas Gerais) Atlético Mineiro	2	0	2
(Rio de Janeiro (state)) Flamengo	1	2	3
Bahia	1	1	2
(Paraná (state)) Athletico Paranaense	2	2	4

Quarter-finals
(Ceará) Fortaleza	0	2	2
(Rio de Janeiro (state)) Fluminense	1	2	3
(Goiás) Atlético Goianiense	2	1	3
(São Paulo (state)) Corinthians	0	4	4
(São Paulo (state)) São Paulo	1	2	3
(Minas Gerais) América Mineiro	0	2	2
(Rio de Janeiro (state)) Flamengo	0	1	1
(Paraná (state)) Athletico Paranaense	0	0	0

Semi-finals
(Rio de Janeiro (state)) Fluminense	2	0	2
(São Paulo (state)) Corinthians	2	3	5
(São Paulo (state)) São Paulo	1	0	1
(Rio de Janeiro (state)) Flamengo	3	1	4

Finals
(São Paulo (state)) Corinthians	0	1	1 (5)
(Rio de Janeiro (state)) Flamengo (p)	0	1	1 (6)

=== Round of 16 ===
The draw for the round of 16 was held on 7 June 2022, 15:00 at CBF headquarters in Rio de Janeiro. The 16 qualified teams were drawn in a single group (CBF ranking shown in parentheses).

Group
(Rio de Janeiro (state)) Flamengo (1); (São Paulo (state)) Palmeiras (2); (Minas Gerais) Atlético Mineiro (3); (Paraná (state)) Athletico Paranaense (5); (São Paulo (state)) Santos (6); (São Paulo (state)) São Paulo (7); (Rio de Janeiro (state)) Fluminense (9); (São Paulo (state)) Corinthians (10)	(Ceará) Fortaleza (11); Bahia (12); Ceará (13); (Minas Gerais) Cruzeiro (14); (Minas Gerais) América Mineiro (15); (Goiás) Atlético Goianiense (16); (Rio de Janeiro (state)) Botafogo (18); Goiás (23)

The first legs were played on 22–30 June and the second legs were played on 12–14 July 2022.

Team 1	Agg.	Team 2	1st leg	2nd leg
Corinthians (São Paulo (state))	4–1	(São Paulo (state)) Santos	4–0	0–1
São Paulo (São Paulo (state))	2–2 (4–3 p)	(São Paulo (state)) Palmeiras	1–0	1–2
Bahia	2–4	(Paraná (state)) Athletico Paranaense	1–2	1–2
Atlético Goianiense (Goiás)	3–0	Goiás	0–0	3–0
Fortaleza (Ceará)	2–1	Ceará	2–0	0–1
Fluminense (Rio de Janeiro (state))	5–1	(Minas Gerais) Cruzeiro	2–1	3–0
América Mineiro (Minas Gerais)	5–0	(Rio de Janeiro (state)) Botafogo	3–0	2–0
Atlético Mineiro (Minas Gerais)	2–3	(Rio de Janeiro (state)) Flamengo	2–1	0–2

=== Quarter-finals ===
The draw for the quarter-finals was held on 19 July 2022, 13:30 at CBF headquarters in Rio de Janeiro. All teams were placed into a single group (CBF ranking shown in parentheses).

Group
- (Rio de Janeiro (state)) Flamengo (1)
- (Paraná (state)) Athletico Paranaense (5)
- (São Paulo (state)) São Paulo (7)
- (Rio de Janeiro (state)) Fluminense (9)
- (São Paulo (state)) Corinthians (10)
- (Ceará) Fortaleza (11)
- (Minas Gerais) América Mineiro (15)
- (Goiás) Atlético Goianiense (16)

The first legs were played on 27–28 July and the second legs were played on 17–18 August 2022.

Team 1	Agg.	Team 2	1st leg	2nd leg
Atlético Goianiense (Goiás)	3–4	(São Paulo (state)) Corinthians	2–0	1–4
Fortaleza (Ceará)	2–3	(Rio de Janeiro (state)) Fluminense	0–1	2–2
São Paulo (São Paulo (state))	3–2	(Minas Gerais) América Mineiro	1–0	2–2
Flamengo (Rio de Janeiro (state))	1–0	(Paraná (state)) Athletico Paranaense	0–0	1–0

=== Semi-finals ===
The draw to determine the home-and-away teams for both legs was held on 19 August 2022, 11:00 at CBF headquarters in Rio de Janeiro. The first legs were played on 24 August and the second legs were played on 14–15 September 2022.

Team 1	Agg.	Team 2	1st leg	2nd leg
Fluminense (Rio de Janeiro (state))	2–5	(São Paulo (state)) Corinthians	2–2	0–3
São Paulo (São Paulo (state))	1–4	(Rio de Janeiro (state)) Flamengo	1–3	0–1

=== Finals ===
The draw to determine the home-and-away teams for both legs was held on 20 September 2022, 11:00 at CBF headquarters in Rio de Janeiro.

12 October 2022
21:45

Corinthians (São Paulo (state))	0–0	(Rio de Janeiro (state)) Flamengo
	Report

Neo Química Arena, São Paulo
Attendance: 47,031
Referee: Bráulio da Silva Machado (Santa Catarina)

19 October 2022
21:45

Flamengo (Rio de Janeiro (state))	1–1	(São Paulo (state)) Corinthians
Pedro 7'	Report	Giuliano 82'
Penalties
Filipe Luís (penalty missed); David Luiz (penalty scored); Léo Pereira (penalty scored); Éverton Ribeiro (penalty scored); Gabriel (penalty scored); Everton (penalty scored); Rodinei (penalty scored)	6–5	(penalty scored) Fábio Santos; (penalty scored) Giuliano; (penalty scored) Renato Augusto; (penalty missed) Fagner; (penalty scored) Yuri Alberto; (penalty scored) Maycon; (penalty missed) Mateus Vital

Maracanã, Rio de Janeiro
Attendance: 68,097
Referee: Wilton Sampaio (Goiás)

2022 Copa do Brasil winners
Flamengo
4th Title

== Top goalscorers ==
Rank	Player	Team	1R	2R	3R1	3R2	⅛F1	⅛F2	QF1	QF2	SF1	SF2	F1	F2	Total
1	(Argentina) Germán Cano	(Rio de Janeiro (state)) Fluminense			1	1	1	1	0	1	0	0			5
1	(Brazil) Giuliano	(São Paulo (state)) Corinthians			0	1	2	0	0	0	x	1	0	1	5
3	(Brazil) Edu	(Minas Gerais) Cruzeiro	1	2	x	1	0	0							4
3	(Brazil) Luciano	(São Paulo (state)) São Paulo	0	0	0	0	x	1	1	2	0	0			4
3	(Brazil) Vina	Ceará	0	1	2	x	0	1							4
6	(Uruguay) Giorgian de Arrascaeta	(Rio de Janeiro (state)) Flamengo			x	0	0	2	0	0	0	1	0	0	3
6	(Brazil) Eduardo Sasha	(Minas Gerais) Atlético Mineiro			3	0	x	x							3
6	(Brazil) Élton	(Mato Grosso) Cuiabá	1	1	1	0									3
6	(Brazil) Fábio Lima	(Rio Grande do Norte) ABC	2	1											3
6	(Brazil) Ganso	(Rio de Janeiro (state)) Fluminense			1	x	0	0	0	1	1	0			3
6	(Brazil) Mário Sérgio	(Piauí) Fluminense	2	1											3
6	(Brazil) Nildo Petrolina	(Bahia) Juazeirense	0	1	1	1									3
6	(Brazil) Pablo	(Paraná (state)) Athletico Paranaense			1	2	0	0	x	0					3
6	(Brazil) Pedro	(Rio de Janeiro (state)) Flamengo			1	0	0	0	0	1	0	0	0	1	3
6	(Argentina) Silvio Romero	(Ceará) Fortaleza			2	x	0	0	0	1					3
6	(Brazil) Shaylon	(Goiás) Atlético Goianiense	1	2	0	0	0	0	0	x					3
6	(Brazil) Vitor Roque^{[1]}	(Minas Gerais) Cruzeiro	2	1											3
6	(Brazil) Yago Pikachu^{[2]}	(Ceará) Fortaleza			0	1	2	0							3
6	(Brazil) Yuri Alberto^{[3]}	(São Paulo (state)) Corinthians							0	3	0	0	0	0	3

^{1} Vitor Roque left Cruzeiro for Athletico Paranaense before the first leg of the third round.
^{2} Yago Pikachu left Fortaleza for Shimizu S-Pulse after the second leg of the round of 16.
^{3} Yuri Alberto was loaned from Zenit to Corinthians after the second leg of the round of 16.
