= Vítor Pereira (footballer, born 1968) =

Portuguese footballer and manager

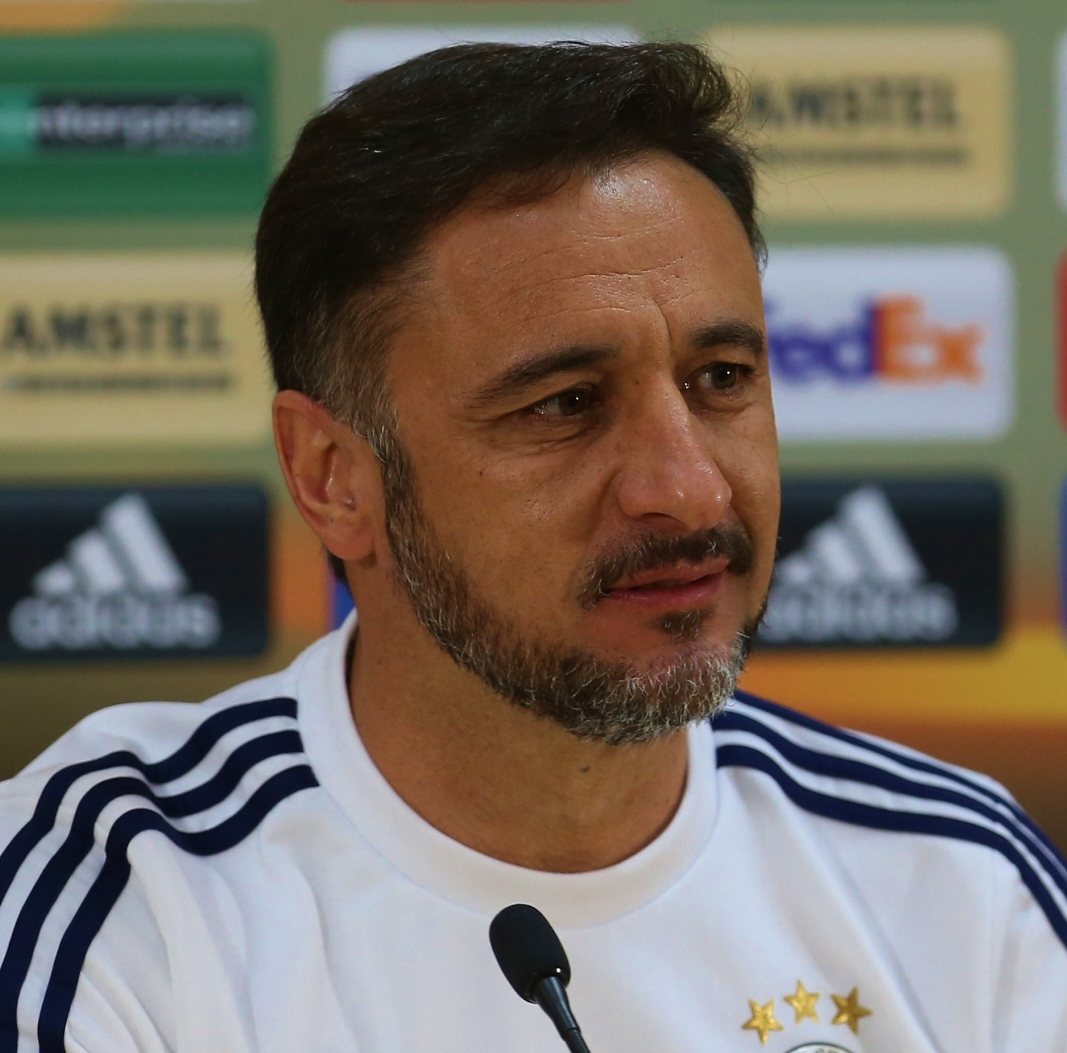
- Pereira with Fenerbahçe in 2016

Personal information
- Full name: Vítor Manuel de Oliveira Lopes Pereira
- Date of birth: 26 July 1968 (age 58)
- Place of birth: Espinho, Portugal
- Height: 1.76 m (5 ft 9 in)
- Position: Midfielder

Youth career
- 1981–1982: Espinho
- 1982–1986: Avanca

Senior career*
Years	Team	Apps	(Gls)
1986–1987	Avanca	23	(3)
1987–1988	Oliveirense	30	(6)
1988–1990	Avanca	54	(11)
1990–1991	Esmoriz	1	(0)
1991–1993	Estarreja	68	(20)
1993–1994	Fiães	14	(0)
1994–1995	São João de Ver	3	(1)
1995–1996	Lobão	4	(3)
Total		197	(44)

Managerial career
- 2002–2003: Padroense (juniors)
- 2003–2004: Porto (juniors)
- 2004–2005: Sanjoanense
- 2005–2007: Espinho
- 2007–2008: Porto (juniors)
- 2008–2010: Santa Clara
- 2010–2011: Porto (assistant)
- 2011–2013: Porto
- 2013–2014: Al-Ahli
- 2015: Olympiacos
- 2015–2016: Fenerbahçe
- 2017: 1860 Munich
- 2017–2020: Shanghai SIPG
- 2021: Fenerbahçe
- 2022: Corinthians
- 2023: Flamengo
- 2024: Al Shabab
- 2024–2025: Wolverhampton Wanderers
- 2026: Nottingham Forest
- * Club domestic league appearances and goals

Vítor Manuel de Oliveira Lopes Pereira (born 26 July 1968) is a Portuguese football manager and former player who played as a midfielder.

Following an amateur playing career, he became manager of Porto, where he won the Primeira Liga in both of his seasons. After leaving in 2013 he worked in several countries, winning a Greek league and cup double with Olympiacos in 2015 and the Chinese Super League with Shanghai SIPG in 2018.

== Playing career ==
Born in Espinho, Pereira only played amateur football. He retired at the age of 28.

== Coaching career ==
=== Early career ===
Pereira started managing at junior level. His first head coach experience arrived midway through the 2004–05 season, when he was appointed at Sanjoanense in the third division.

Subsequently, Pereira worked with Espinho of the same league, being fired with ten games left in his second campaign and returning to Porto's juniors for a further season. In 2008 he returned to head coaching again, with Santa Clara in the Segunda Liga, leading the Azores side to the third position in his first year and the fourth in the second, on both occasions narrowly missing out on Primeira Liga promotion.

=== Porto ===
In the summer of 2010, Pereira left Santa Clara to become assistant manager to André Villas-Boas at Porto. On 21 June 2011, following the head coach's departure to Chelsea, he was promoted to first-team manager, winning his first official match – and title – 2–1 against Vitória de Guimarães in the Supertaça Cândido de Oliveira.

Despite a less than stellar performance both in Europe – being knocked out of the UEFA Champions League in the group stage and in the UEFA Europa League's round of 32– and in the Taça de Portugal, Pereira led the club to the league title in his first season in charge. In March 2013, following the team's elimination from Champions League contention (2–1 on aggregate against Málaga), he came under heavy criticism, notably due to his decision of benching James Rodríguez during the first half of both legs. The Colombian stated his disappointment in the coach's decision, but said that he respected him and trusted his reasons, adding that the situation was possibly created because of his questionable fitness, even though he claimed to be 100% fit.

In early May 2013, as Porto ranked second in the league, Pereira deemed the Portuguese league as a "dirty competition". Only a few days later, after his team defeated Benfica at home to surpass its opponents – eventually winning the league title, conceding six draws in 30 games– he considered it to be a "highly competitive and prestigious league".

=== Five clubs in eight years ===
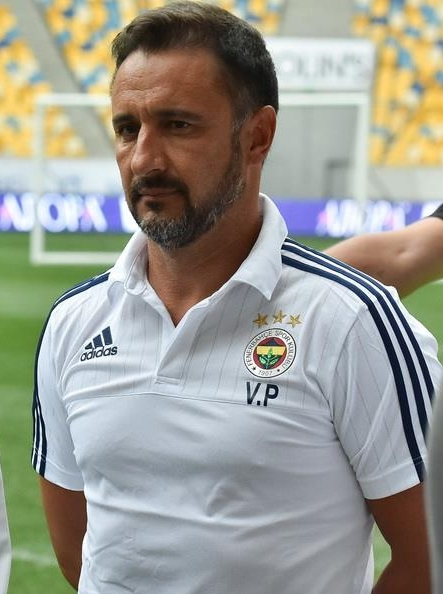
Pereira as manager of Fenerbahçe in 2015

In late May 2013, Pereira was interviewed for the vacant job at Premier League club Everton, but eventually signed a two-year deal with Al-Ahli of the Saudi Professional League. On 7 January 2015 he moved countries again, replacing the fired Míchel at the helm of Olympiacos and eventually winning the double.

On 10 June 2015, Olympiacos announced a mutual contract termination with Pereira. The following day, he was appointed at Fenerbahçe for two years.

The Turkish side cut ties unilaterally with Pereira on 15 August 2016, with the case being subsequently taken to the Court of Arbitration for Sport. On 18 December, he was named head coach of 1860 Munich in the German 2. Bundesliga, with the one-and-a-half-year deal being made effective the following 1 January. The team finished the season third from bottom, and eventually got relegated on 30 May 2017 after a 3–1 loss aggregate loss to SSV Jahn Regensburg in the play-offs.

Pereira became the manager of Shanghai SIPG on 12 December 2017, replacing Villas-Boas at the Chinese Super League club. In his debut campaign, he guided them to their first-ever title in the competition. In December 2019 he turned down a new approach from Everton and, one year later, left Shanghai.

Pereira returned to Fenerbahçe on 2 July 2021, on a two-year contract. He was sacked on 20 December after a 2–2 home draw with Istanbul rivals Beşiktaş; his side were in fifth position and 14 points behind leaders Trabzonspor. A month later, he was again linked with Everton as owner Farhad Moshiri's lead candidate, prompting anger and vandalism from fans who saw him as inadequate and wanted eventual appointee Frank Lampard instead; he defended his reputation in an interview on Sky Sports News.

=== Corinthians ===
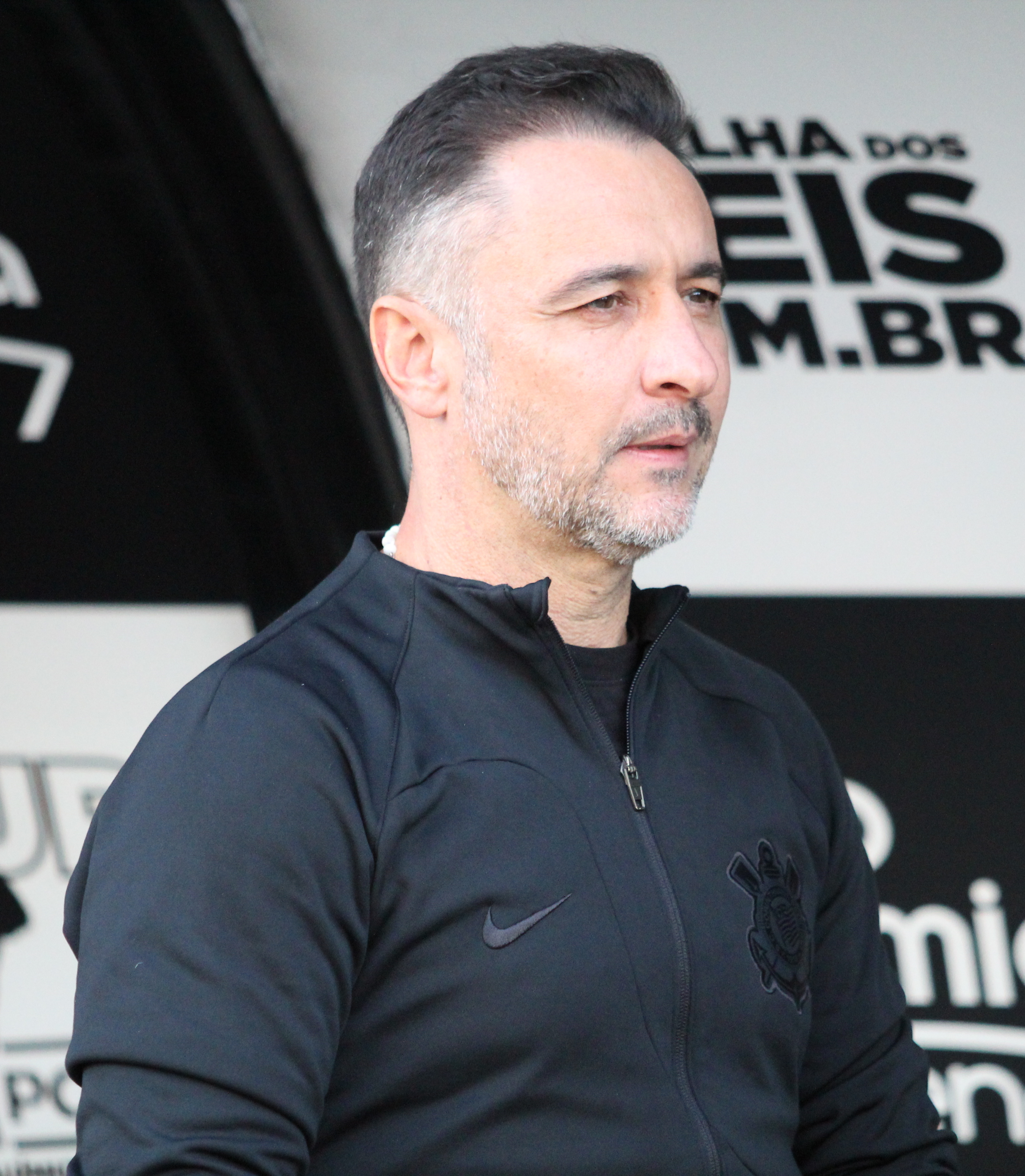
Pereira with Corinthians in 2022

On 23 February 2022, Pereira was announced as head coach of Campeonato Brasileiro Série A club Corinthians, signing until the end of the year. He lost to an opening-minute goal away to rivals São Paulo on his Campeonato Paulista debut a week later, and the state championship ended with a 2–1 semi-final loss to the same opponents.

In October 2022, Pereira's team lost the final of the Copa do Brasil on penalties to Flamengo. Just hours after the last match of the season on 13 November, it was announced that he would not renew his contract. He said in a social media post that he had to return home due to his mother-in-law's health.

=== Flamengo ===
Shortly after leaving Corinthians, Pereira was appointed at Flamengo also of the Brazilian top flight. On 28 January 2023, his team lost the Supercopa do Brasil 4–3 to Palmeiras. His second defeat took place on 7 February, 3–2 against Al Hilal in the semi-finals of the FIFA Club World Cup after playing the entire second half with one player less. Later that month, they were beaten on penalties by Ecuador's Independiente del Valle in the Recopa Sudamericana (1–1 over two legs).

Pereira was dismissed on 11 April 2023, two days after losing 4–3 on aggregate to rivals Fluminense in the Campeonato Carioca.

=== Al Shabab ===
Pereira returned to the Saudi Pro League on 4 February 2024, replacing the fired Igor Bišćan at Al Shabab on at a deal until the end of the season. He took charge of the side when they were just four points above the relegation zone and led them to eighth place, subsequently renewing his contract until June 2025.

=== Wolverhampton Wanderers ===
On 19 December 2024, Pereira was appointed at Premier League club Wolverhampton Wanderers on a contract lasting until June 2026; he replaced Gary O'Neil with the task of avoiding relegation, with the team in 19th place and with just nine points from 16 matches. On his debut three days later, he oversaw a 3–0 away win over Leicester City.

On 5 April 2025, Wolves stretched its points total to 12 points above the relegation zone with a 2–1 victory at Ipswich Town. The following weekend, after defeating Tottenham Hotspur 4–2 at home, Pereira celebrated with fans at the Moon Under Water pub. On the 20th, they confirmed survival with the 1–0 away win against Manchester United, completing a league double over their opponent for the first time since the 1979–80 season.

Pereira signed a new three-year deal on 18 September 2025, in spite of having lost the first four games of the new campaign. On 2 November, however, with the side bottom of the table with just two points, he was sacked.

=== Nottingham Forest ===
On 15 February 2026, Pereira took over as Nottingham Forest's fourth manager of the season, agreeing to a contract until June 2027. In his debut campaign, he led them to the semi finals of the Europa League and finished 16th on the domestic front.

Pereira was dismissed on 30 June 2026 via email, shortly before a contractual clause increasing his compensation was due to take effect. He had already finalised Forest's pre-season plans, including a training camp in Portugal and scheduled friendlies; his departure was confirmed two days later.

== Managerial statistics ==
As of match played 24 May 2026

Managerial record by team and tenure
Team	From	To	Record					Ref.
Team	From	To	P	W	D	L	Win %	Ref.
Sanjoanense	30 November 2004	30 May 2005	24	9	7	8	37.50	
Espinho	31 May 2005	19 March 2007	51	25	17	9	49.02	
Santa Clara	1 June 2008	3 June 2010	73	34	21	18	46.58	
Porto	22 June 2011	7 June 2013	93	65	16	12	69.89	
Al-Ahli	1 July 2013	4 May 2014	37	19	10	8	51.35	
Olympiacos	8 January 2015	10 June 2015	27	18	6	3	66.67	
Fenerbahçe	11 June 2015	15 August 2016	62	38	15	9	61.29	
1860 Munich	1 January 2017	31 May 2017	20	6	3	11	30.00	
Shanghai SIPG	12 December 2017	31 December 2020	118	69	27	22	58.47	
Fenerbahçe	2 July 2021	20 December 2021	25	11	7	7	44.00	
Corinthians	23 February 2022	31 December 2022	64	26	21	17	40.63	
Flamengo	1 January 2023	11 April 2023	18	10	1	7	55.56	
Al Shabab	4 February 2024	19 December 2024	30	16	4	10	53.33	
Wolverhampton Wanderers	19 December 2024	2 November 2025	38	14	6	18	36.84	
Nottingham Forest	15 February 2026	2 July 2026	20	8	6	6	40.00	
Total			699	368	167	164	52.65	

== Honours ==
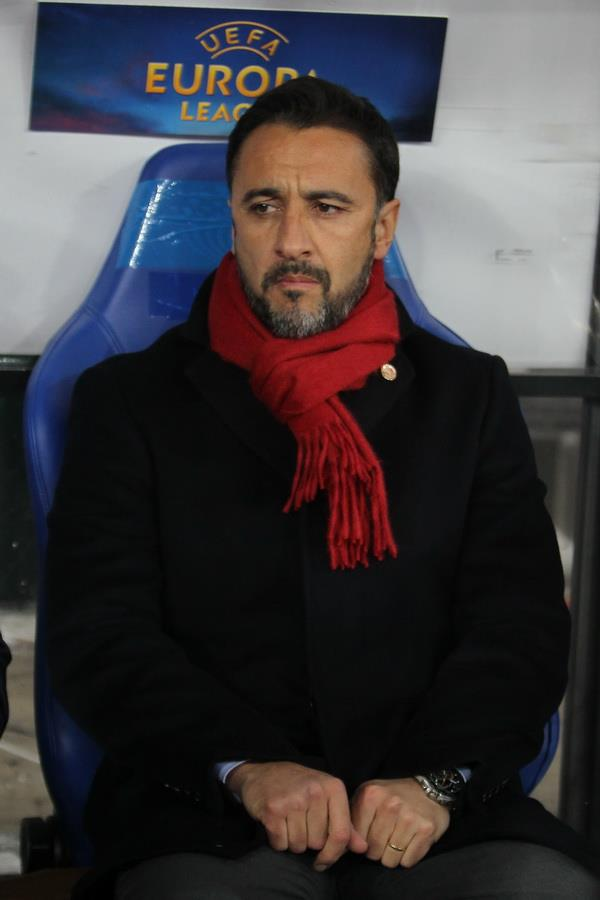
Pereira with Olympiacos in 2015

Porto

- Primeira Liga: 2011–12, 2012–13
- Supertaça Cândido de Oliveira: 2011, 2012
- Taça da Liga runner-up: 2012–13
- UEFA Super Cup runner-up: 2011

Al-Ahli

- King's Cup runner-up: 2014

Olympiacos

- Super League Greece: 2014–15
- Greek Football Cup: 2014–15

Fenerbahçe

- Turkish Cup runner-up: 2015–16

Shanghai SIPG

- Chinese Super League: 2018
- Chinese FA Super Cup: 2019

Corinthians

- Copa do Brasil runner-up: 2022

Flamengo

- Supercopa do Brasil runner-up: 2023
- Campeonato Carioca runner-up: 2023
- Recopa Sudamericana runner-up: 2023

Individual

- Saudi Pro League Manager of the Month: April 2024
- Premier League Manager of the Month: April 2025
