= Clébson (footballer, born 1985) =

Brazilian footballer (born 1985)

Personal information
- Full name: José Clébson de Lima
- Date of birth: September 4, 1985 (age 41)
- Place of birth: Agrestina, Brazil
- Height: 1.64 m (5 ft 5 in)
- Position: Attacking midfielder

Team information
- Current team: Fluminense de Feira

Youth career
- 2003–2004: Hellas Verona

Senior career*
Years	Team	Apps	(Gls)
2004	Porto-PE	0	(0)
2004–2005	Como	0	(0)
2006	Central	0	(0)
2007	Treze	0	(0)
2008	Icasa	0	(0)
2008	Cabense	0	(0)
2009	Ferroviário	0	(0)
2009	Cabense	0	(0)
2010–2012	Salgueiro	91	(14)
2012	Remo	3	(0)
2013	Salgueiro	21	(6)
2014	Treze	11	(4)
2014	Boa Esporte	27	(4)
2015	Linense	14	(0)
2015	América de Natal	2	(0)
2015	Boa Esporte	28	(3)
2016	São Bento	12	(1)
2016	Oeste	4	(0)
2016–2017	Brasil de Pelotas	18	(0)
2017	São Bento	12	(1)
2017	Figueirense	1	(0)
2018	Brusque	0	(0)
2018	Caldense	0	(0)
2018	Pouso Alegre		
2019	Guarani MG	0	(0)
2019	Juazeirense	11	(2)
2019	Anápolis		
2020-2023	Juazeirense	0	(0)
2023–	Fluminense de Feira	6	(3)
- * Club domestic league appearances and goals as of 16:05, 22 February 2020 (UTC)

José Clébson de Lima (born September 4, 1985), known as Clébson, is a Brazilian professional footballer who and plays as an attacking midfielder for Brazilian club Fluminense de Feira.

== Club career ==
Clébson started his career playing with Porto. He made his professional debut during the 2004 season.
