= Tuntum =

- Municipality
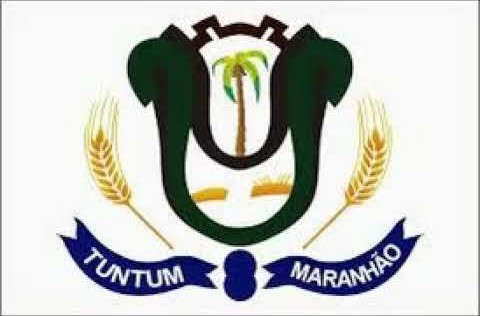
- Flag

- Municipal location

- Location in Brazil
- Coordinates: 5°14′S 44°39′W
- Country: Brazil
- Region: Nordeste
- State: Maranhão
- Mesoregion: Centro Maranhense

Area
  - Total: 1,379.70 sq mi (3,573.41 km^{2})

Population (2020)
  - Total: 42,040
- Time zone: UTC−3 (BRT)

Tuntum is a municipality in the state of Maranhão in the Northeast region of Brazil.

== See also ==
- List of municipalities in Maranhão
