= Wilton Sampaio =

Brazilian football referee (born 1981)

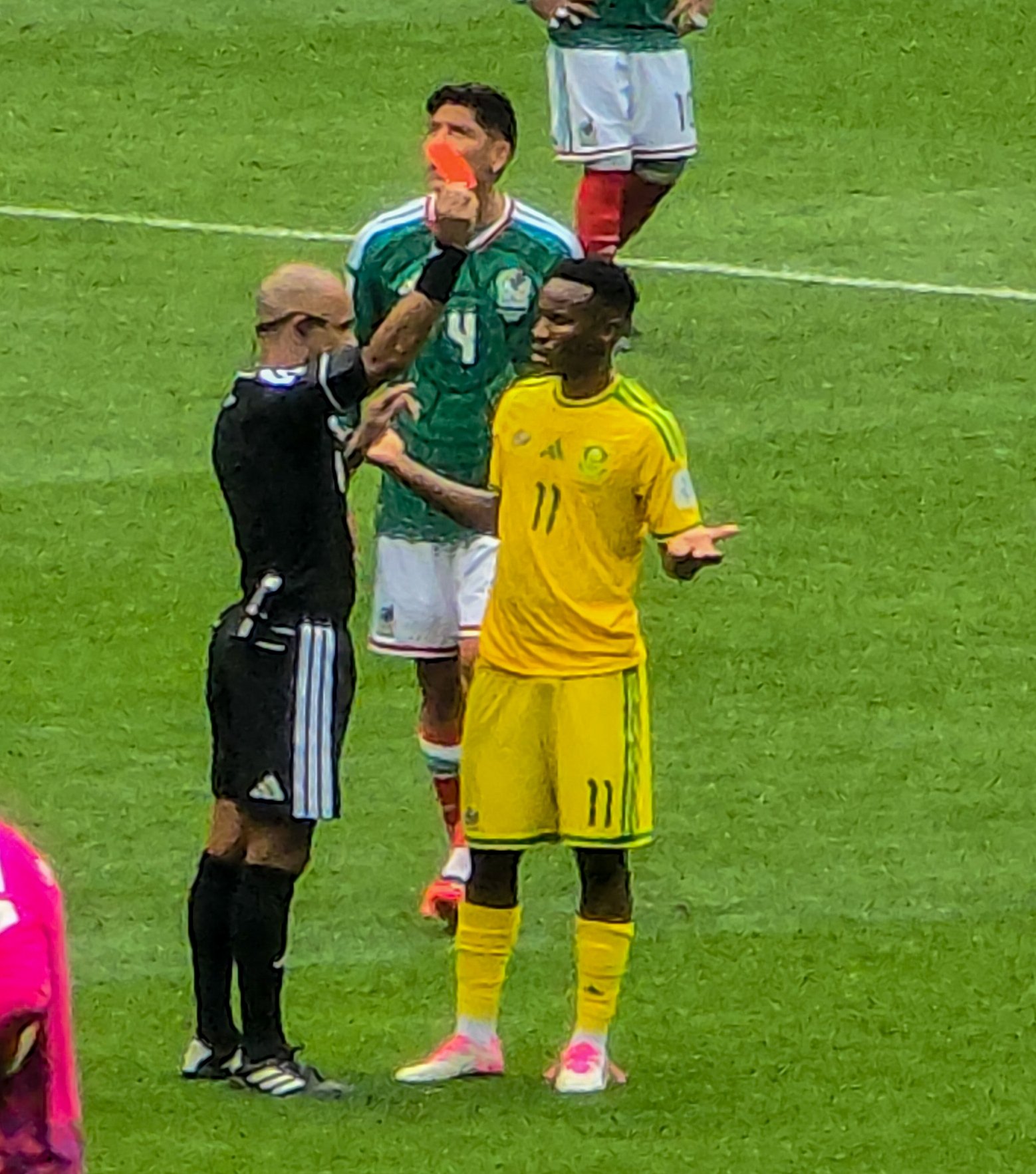
- Sampaio red card at the 2026 World Cup
- Full name: Wilton Pereira Sampaio
- Born: 28 December 1981 (age 44); Teresina de Goiás, Brazil

International
Years	League	Role
2013–	FIFA	Referee

Wilton Pereira Sampaio (born 28 December 1981) is a Brazilian football referee. He has been on FIFA's list of international referees since 2013. His younger brother Sávio Pereira Sampaio is also a referee and on FIFA's list since 2022.

== Professional ==
Sampaio began refereeing at age 15, qualified in Brasília in 2000 and currently represents the Federação Goiana de Futebol and FIFA. He was elected as one of the best referees in the 2012 Campeonato Brasileiro Série A championships.

Sampaio was considered too short by Brazilian referee head, Armando Marques, but after Marques left in 2005, Sampaio was given more high profile games.

Sampaio was part of the video assistant referee (VAR) team when it was introduced in the 2018 FIFA World Cup. He also refereed in both the 2021 FIFA Arab Cup and 2022 FIFA World Cup in Qatar.

In June 2026, Sampaio was selected by FIFA as the referee of the inaugural match of the 2026 FIFA World Cup at Estadio Azteca in Mexico City between Mexico and South Africa. He sent off a total of three players during the match, the most in a World Cup opening game.

== Selected performances ==
2022 FIFA World Cup
Date	Match	Venue	Round	Attendance
21 November 2022	Senegal vs Netherlands	Al Thumama Stadium, Doha	Group stage	41,721
26 November 2022	Poland vs Saudi Arabia	Education City Stadium, Al Khor	Group stage	44,259
3 December 2022	Netherlands vs United States	Khalifa International Stadium, Al Rayyan	Round of 16	44,846
10 December 2022	England vs France	Al Bayt Stadium, Al Khor	Quarter-finals	68,895
2026 FIFA World Cup
11 June 2026	Mexico vs South Africa	Estadio Azteca, Mexico City	Group stage	80,824
23 June 2026	Norway vs Senegal	MetLife Stadium, East Rutherford	Group stage	80,663
29 June 2026	Netherlands vs Morocco	Estadio BBVA, Guadelupe	Round of 32	51,243
