= Federação Gaúcha de Futebol =

Brazilian football state federation

- Formation: 18 May 1918; 108 years ago
- Type: List of international sport federations
- Headquarters: Porto Alegre, Rio Grande do Sul, Brazil
- Official language: Portuguese
- President: Luciano Dahmer Hocsman
- Website: fgf.com.br

The Football Association of Rio Grande do Sul (Portuguese: Federação Gaúcha de Futebol; FGF) was founded by Aurelio Py on May 18, 1918 and manages all the official football tournaments within the state of Rio Grande do Sul, which are the Campeonato Gaúcho, Campeonato Gaúcho Série A2, Campeonato Gaúcho Série B, the state cup Copa FGF, the state supercup Recopa Gaúcha, as well a number of state-level amateur tournaments. It also represents the clubs at the Brazilian Football Confederation (CBF).

== Current clubs in Brasileirão ==
As of 2022 season. Common team names are noted in bold.

Club	City
Série A
Internacional	Porto Alegre
Juventude	Caxias do Sul
Série B
Grêmio	Porto Alegre
Série C
Brasil de Pelotas	Pelotas
Ypiranga	Erechim
São José	Porto Alegre
Série D
Aimoré	São Leopoldo
Caxias	Caxias do Sul
São Luiz	Ijuí
