= Federação Catarinense de Futebol =

Brazilian football state federation

- Formation: 12 April 1924; 102 years ago
- Type: List of international sport federations
- Headquarters: Balneário Camboriú, Santa Catarina, Brazil
- Official language: Portuguese
- President: Francisco Novelletto Neto
- Website: fcf.com.br

The Federação Catarinense de Futebol (English: Football Association of Santa Catarina state) was founded on 12 April 1924, and manages all the official football tournaments within the state of Santa Catarina, which are the Campeonato Catarinense, the Campeonato Catarinense Série B, Campeonato Catarinense Série C and the Copa Santa Catarina, and represents the clubs at the Brazilian Football Confederation (CBF).

== Founding members ==
The Federação Catarinense de Futebol was founded by the following clubs:

- Avaí
- Figueirense
- Florianópolis
- Internato

== Current clubs in Brasileirão ==
As of 2022 season. Common team names are noted in bold.

Club	City
Série A
Avaí	Florianópolis
Série B
Brusque	Brusque
Chapecoense	Chapecó
Criciúma	Criciúma
Série C
Figueirense	Florianópolis
Série D
Juventus	Jaraguá do Sul
Marcílio Dias	Itajaí
Próspera	Criciúma
