= Federação Goiana de Futebol =

Brazilian football club

- Formation: 1 November 1939; 87 years ago
- Type: List of international sport federations
- Headquarters: Goiânia, GO, Brazil
- Official language: Portuguese
- President: André Luiz Pitta Pires
- Website: www.fgf.esp.br

The Federação Goiana de Futebol (English: Football Association of Goiás state) was founded on November 1, 1939, and manages all the official football tournaments within the state of Goiás, which are the Campeonato Goiano, the Campeonato Goiano lower levels, and represents the clubs at the Brazilian Football Confederation (CBF).

== Current clubs in Brasileirão ==
As of 2022 season. Common team names are noted in bold.

Club	City
Série A
Atlético Goianiense	Goiânia
Goiás	Goiânia
Série B
Vila Nova	Goiânia
Série C
Aparecidense	Aparecida de Goiânia
Série D
Anápolis	Anápolis
Grêmio Anápolis	Anápolis
Iporá	Iporá
