= 2021 Copa do Brasil finals =

2021 Copa do Brasil Finals
Atlético Mineiro	Athletico Paranaense
(Minas Gerais)	(Paraná (state))
6	1
- on aggregate

First leg
Atlético Mineiro	Athletico Paranaense
4	0
- Date: 12 December 2021
- Venue: Mineirão, Belo Horizonte
- Man of the Match: Keno (Atlético Mineiro)
- Referee: Bruno Arleu de Araújo (Rio de Janeiro)
- Attendance: 53,181

Second leg
Athletico Paranaense	Atlético Mineiro
1	2
- Date: 15 December 2021
- Venue: Arena da Baixada, Curitiba
- Man of the Match: Keno (Atlético Mineiro)
- Referee: Anderson Daronco (Rio Grande do Sul)
- Attendance: 32,557

The 2021 Copa do Brasil Finals were the final two-legged tie that decided the 2021 Copa do Brasil, the 33rd season of the Copa do Brasil, Brazil's national cup football tournament organised by the Brazilian Football Confederation.

The finals were contested in a two-legged home-and-away format between Atlético Mineiro, from Minas Gerais, and Athletico Paranaense, from Paraná. Both teams disputed their third Copa do Brasil finals.

A draw by CBF was held on 4 November 2021 to determine the home-and-away teams for each leg. The first leg was hosted by Atlético Mineiro at Mineirão in Belo Horizonte on 12 December 2021, while the second leg was hosted by Athletico Paranaense at Arena da Baixada in Curitiba on 15 December 2021.

Atlético Mineiro defeated Athletico Paranaense 6–1 on aggregate in the finals to win their second title. As champions, Atlético Mineiro qualified for the 2022 Copa Libertadores group stage and the 2022 Copa do Brasil third round. As Atlético Mineiro also won the 2021 Campeonato Brasileiro Série A, they played in the 2022 Supercopa do Brasil against the 2021 Campeonato Brasileiro Série A runners-up.

== Teams ==
Team	Previous finals appearances (bold indicates winners)
(Minas Gerais) Atlético Mineiro	2 (**2014**, 2016)
(Paraná (state)) Athletico Paranaense	2 (2013, **2019**)

=== Road to the final ===
Note: In all scores below, the score of the home team is given first.

(Minas Gerais) Atlético Mineiro			Round	(Paraná (state)) Athletico Paranaense		
Opponent	Venue	Score		Opponent	Venue	Score
(Pará) Remo (won 4–1 on aggregate)	Away	0–2	Third round	(Santa Catarina (state)) Avaí (won 2–1 on aggregate)	Away	1–1
(Pará) Remo (won 4–1 on aggregate)	Home	2–1	Third round	(Santa Catarina (state)) Avaí (won 2–1 on aggregate)	Home	1–0
Bahia (won 3–2 on aggregate)	Home	2–0	Round of 16	(Goiás) Atlético Goianiense (won 4–3 on aggregate)	Home	2–1
Bahia (won 3–2 on aggregate)	Away	2–1	Round of 16	(Goiás) Atlético Goianiense (won 4–3 on aggregate)	Away	2–2
(Rio de Janeiro (state)) Fluminense (won 3–1 on aggregate)	Away	1–2	Quarter-finals	(São Paulo (state)) Santos (won 2–0 on aggregate)	Home	1–0
(Rio de Janeiro (state)) Fluminense (won 3–1 on aggregate)	Home	1–0	Quarter-finals	(São Paulo (state)) Santos (won 2–0 on aggregate)	Away	0–1
(Ceará) Fortaleza (won 6–1 on aggregate)	Home	4–0	Semi-finals	(Rio de Janeiro (state)) Flamengo (won 5–2 on aggregate)	Home	2–2
(Ceará) Fortaleza (won 6–1 on aggregate)	Away	1–2	Semi-finals	(Rio de Janeiro (state)) Flamengo (won 5–2 on aggregate)	Away	0–3

== Format ==
In the finals, the teams played a single-elimination tournament with the following rules:

- The finals were played on a home-and-away two-legged basis. The home-and-away teams for both legs were determined by a draw held on 4 November 2021 at the CBF headquarters in Rio de Janeiro, Brazil.
- If tied on aggregate, the away goals rule and extra time would not be used and the penalty shoot-out would be used to determine the winners. (Regulations Article 20).

== Matches ==
=== First leg ===
12 December 2021
17:30 UTC−3

Atlético Mineiro (Minas Gerais)	4–0	(Paraná (state)) Athletico Paranaense
Hulk 23' (pen.); Keno 34'; Vargas 55', 68'	Report

Mineirão, Belo Horizonte
Attendance: 53,181
Referee: Bruno Arleu de Araújo (Rio de Janeiro)

**Atlético Mineiro**	**Athletico Paranaense**

GK	22	(Brazil) Everson
RB	25	(Brazil) Mariano
RCB	16	(Brazil) Igor Rabello	(yellow card) 79'
LCB	3	(Paraguay) Júnior Alonso (c)
LB	13	(Brazil) Guilherme Arana	(yellow card) 57'
CDM	29	(Brazil) Allan		(substituted off) 83'
RM	15	(Argentina) Matías Zaracho
LM	8	(Brazil) Jair		(substituted off) 83'
RW	7	(Brazil) Hulk	(yellow card) 22'
LW	11	(Brazil) Keno		(substituted off) 66'
CF	19	(Spain) Diego Costa		(substituted off) 12'
Substitutes:
GK	32	(Brazil) Rafael
DF	2	(Brazil) Guga
DF	6	(Brazil) Dodô
DF	45	(Brazil) Micael
MF	20	(Brazil) Hyoran
MF	23	(Brazil) Nathan
MF	26	(Argentina) Ignacio Fernández		(substituted on) 66'
MF	27	(Brazil) Calebe		(substituted on) 83'
MF	37	(Brazil) Tchê Tchê		(substituted on) 83'
FW	10	(Chile) Eduardo Vargas		(substituted on) 12'
FW	17	(Venezuela) Jefferson Savarino
FW	18	(Brazil) Eduardo Sasha
Manager:
(Brazil) Cuca

GK	1	(Brazil) Santos
RCB	34	(Brazil) Pedro Henrique	(yellow card) 53'
CB	44	(Brazil) Thiago Heleno (c)	(yellow card) 10'
LCB	2	(Colombia) Nicolás Hernández	(yellow card) 18'	(substituted off) 61'
RM	5	(Brazil) Marcinho
RDM	26	(Brazil) Erick
LDM	18	(Brazil) Léo Cittadini		(substituted off) 84'
LM	16	(Brazil) Abner Vinícius		(substituted off) 84'
RW	11	(Brazil) Nikão
LW	80	(Uruguay) David Terans		(substituted off) 71'
CF	79	(Brazil) Renato Kayzer		(substituted off) 71'
Substitutes:
GK	99	(Brazil) Bento
DF	6	(Brazil) Márcio Azevedo
DF	8	(Brazil) Nicolas		(substituted on) 84'
DF	27	(Brazil) Zé Ivaldo
DF	37	(Brazil) Lucas Fasson
MF	19	(Brazil) Jáderson
MF	42	(Brazil) Juninho
MF	55	(Brazil) Fernando Canesin		(substituted on) 84'
FW	15	(Brazil) Jader		(substituted on) 71'
FW	23	(Brazil) Rômulo
FW	32	(Brazil) Pedro Rocha		(substituted on) 61'
FW	38	(Brazil) Vinícius Mingotti		(substituted on) 71'
Manager:
(Brazil) Alberto Valentim

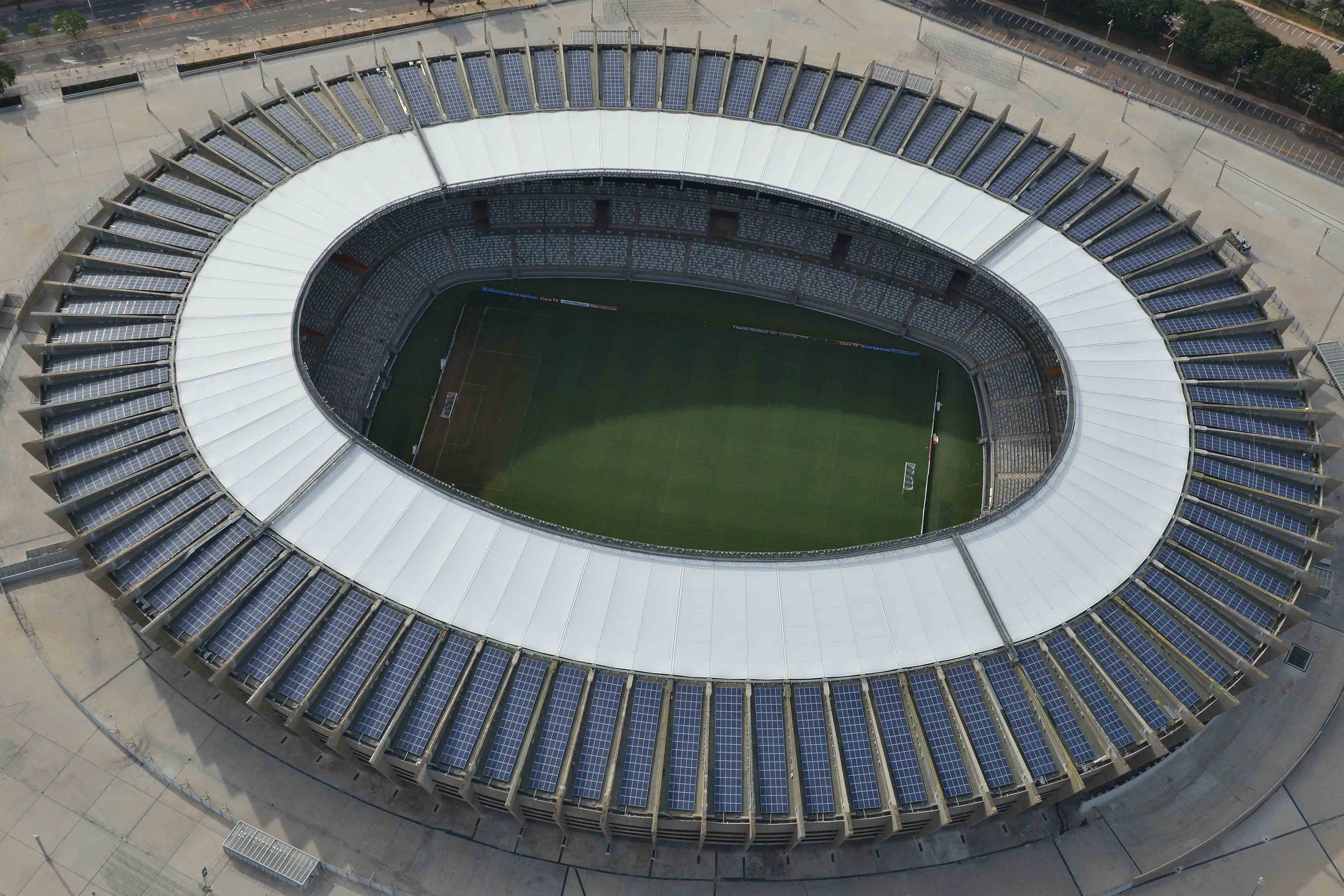
Mineirão in Belo Horizonte hosted the first leg.

Man of the Match:
(Brazil) Keno (Atlético Mineiro)

Assistant referees:
Rodrigo Figueiredo Henrique Corrêa (Rio de Janeiro)
Fabrício Vilarinho da Silva (Goiás)
Fourth official:
Sávio Pereira Sampaio (Distrito Federal)
Fifth official:
Guilherme Dias Camilo (Minas Gerais)
Video assistant referee:
Rodrigo Nunes de Sá (Rio de Janeiro)
Assistant video assistant referees:
Diogo Carvalho Silva (Rio de Janeiro)

=== Second leg ===
15 December 2021
21:30 UTC−3

Athletico Paranaense (Paraná (state))	1–2	(Minas Gerais) Atlético Mineiro
Jáderson 86'	Report	Keno 25'; Hulk 75'

Arena da Baixada, Curitiba
Attendance: 32,557
Referee: Anderson Daronco (Rio Grande do Sul)

**Athletico Paranaense**	**Atlético Mineiro**

GK	1	(Brazil) Santos (c)
RB	5	(Brazil) Marcinho		(substituted off) 64'
RCB	34	(Brazil) Pedro Henrique
LCB	27	(Brazil) Zé Ivaldo
LB	16	(Brazil) Abner Vinícius	(yellow card) 45+4'
RM	26	(Brazil) Erick
LM	18	(Brazil) Léo Cittadini	(yellow card) 45+5'	(substituted off) 46'
RW	32	(Brazil) Pedro Rocha		(substituted off) 73'
AM	80	(Uruguay) David Terans
LW	88	(Brazil) Christian		(substituted off) 46'
CF	79	(Brazil) Renato Kayzer	(yellow card) 28'	(substituted off) 40'
Substitutes:
GK	99	(Brazil) Bento
DF	2	(Colombia) Nicolás Hernández
DF	6	(Brazil) Márcio Azevedo
DF	8	(Brazil) Nicolas
DF	13	(Brazil) Khellven		(substituted on) 64'
DF	37	(Brazil) Lucas Fasson
MF	19	(Brazil) Jáderson		(substituted on) 73'
MF	42	(Brazil) Juninho
MF	55	(Brazil) Fernando Canesin		(substituted on) 46'
FW	15	(Brazil) Jader		(substituted on) 46'
FW	23	(Brazil) Rômulo
FW	38	(Brazil) Vinícius Mingotti		(substituted on) 40'
Manager:
(Brazil) Alberto Valentim

GK	22	(Brazil) Everson
RB	25	(Brazil) Mariano
RCB	16	(Brazil) Igor Rabello
LCB	3	(Paraguay) Júnior Alonso (c)
LB	13	(Brazil) Guilherme Arana
CDM	29	(Brazil) Allan
RM	15	(Argentina) Matías Zaracho		(substituted off) 73'
LM	8	(Brazil) Jair	(yellow card) 55'	(substituted off) 81'
RW	7	(Brazil) Hulk		(substituted off) 81'
LW	11	(Brazil) Keno		(substituted off) 73'
CF	10	(Chile) Eduardo Vargas	(yellow card) 45+5'	(substituted off) 62'
Substitutes:
GK	32	(Brazil) Rafael
DF	2	(Brazil) Guga
DF	4	(Brazil) Réver
DF	6	(Brazil) Dodô
MF	20	(Brazil) Hyoran
MF	23	(Brazil) Nathan
MF	26	(Argentina) Ignacio Fernández		(substituted on) 62'
MF	27	(Brazil) Calebe		(substituted on) 73'
MF	37	(Brazil) Tchê Tchê		(substituted on) 81'
MF	41	(Brazil) Neto
FW	17	(Venezuela) Jefferson Savarino		(substituted on) 73'
FW	18	(Brazil) Eduardo Sasha		(substituted on) 81'
Manager:
(Brazil) Cuca

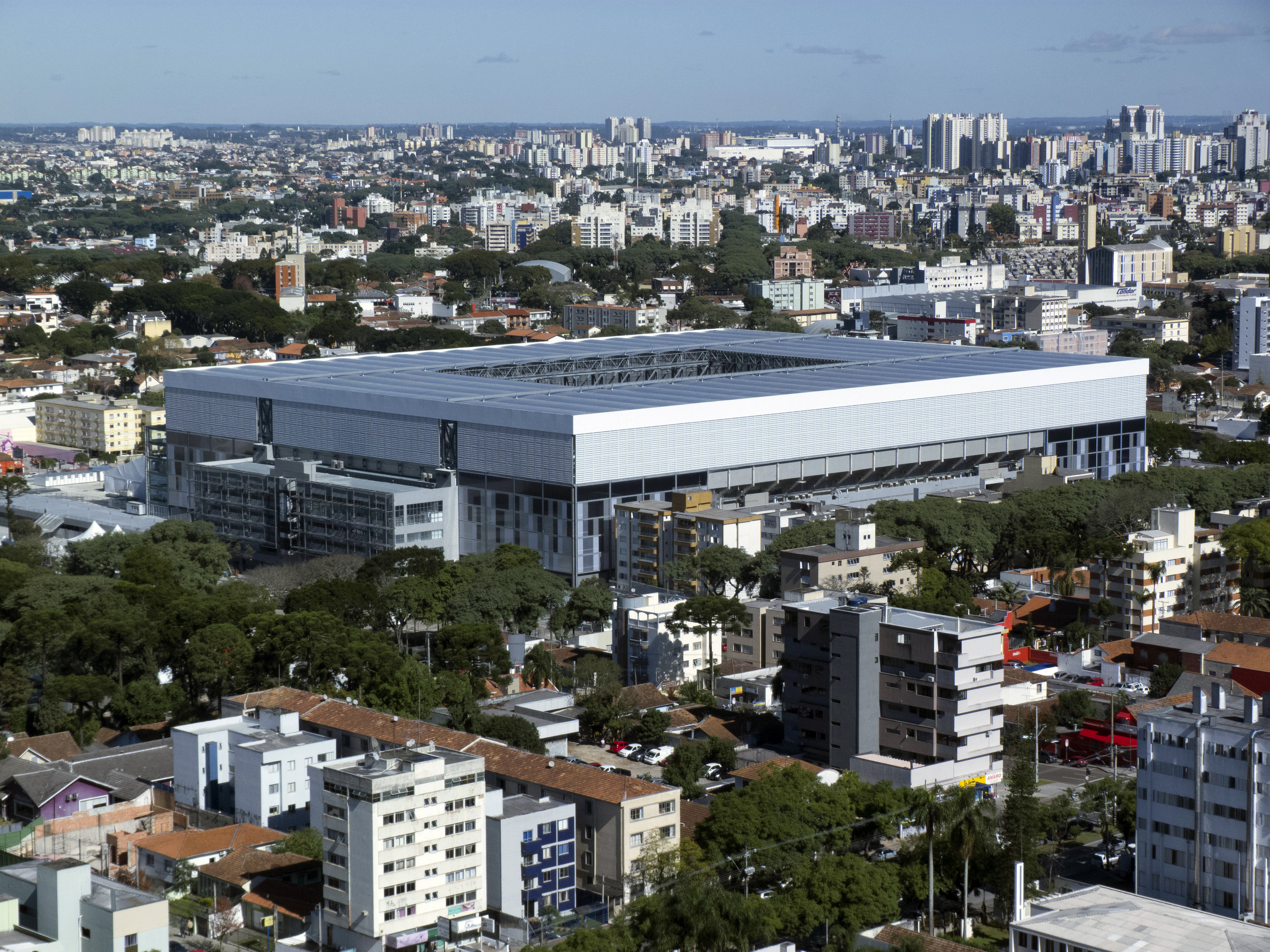
Arena da Baixada in Curitiba hosted the second leg.

Man of the Match:
(Brazil) Keno (Atlético Mineiro)

Assistant referees:
Marcelo Carvalho Van Gasse (São Paulo)
Rafael da Silva Alves (Rio Grande do Sul)
Fourth official:
Bráulio da Silva Machado (Santa Catarina)
Fifth official:
Bruno Boschilia (Paraná)
Video assistant referee:
Daniel Nobre Bins (Rio Grande do Sul)
Assistant video assistant referees:
André da Silva Bitencourt (Rio Grande do Sul)

== See also ==
- 2021 Campeonato Brasileiro Série A
