= 2021 Copa do Brasil second round =

Brazilian football competition

The 2021 Copa do Brasil second round was the second round of the 2021 Copa do Brasil football competition. It was played from 26 March to 15 April 2021. A total of 40 teams competed in the second round to decide 20 places in the third round of the 2021 Copa do Brasil.

== Format ==
In the second round, each tie was played on a single-legged basis. If the score was level, the match would go straight to the penalty shoot-out to determine the winners. Host teams were settled in the first-round draw.

== Matches ==
All times are Brasília time, BRT (UTC−3)

Team 1	Score	Team 2
América Mineiro (Minas Gerais)	1–1 (3–2 p)	(Ceará) Ferroviário
4 de Julho (Piauí)	0–0 (5–4 p)	(Mato Grosso) Cuiabá
ABC (Rio Grande do Norte)	1–1 (4–1 p)	(Rio de Janeiro (state)) Botafogo
CSA (Alagoas)	1–1 (5–6 p)	(Pará) Remo
Bahia	4–1	(Amazonas (Brazilian state)) Manaus
Criciúma (Santa Catarina (state))	1–1 (5–4 p)	(São Paulo (state)) Ponte Preta
Picos (Piauí)	0–1	(Rio de Janeiro (state)) Boavista
Avaí (Santa Catarina (state))	2–0	(Paraná (state)) FC Cascavel
Juazeirense (Bahia)	3–3 (4–2 p)	(Rio de Janeiro (state)) Volta Redonda
Vila Nova (Goiás)	1–1 (4–3 p)	(Rio Grande do Sul) Juventude
Joinville (Santa Catarina (state))	0–2	(Goiás) Atlético Goianiense
Vitória (Bahia)	2–0	(Espírito Santo) Rio Branco
Corinthians (São Paulo (state))	1–1 (5–3 p)	(Pernambuco) Retrô
Paysandu (Pará)	1–2	(Alagoas) CRB
Tombense (Minas Gerais)	1–2	(Rio de Janeiro (state)) Vasco da Gama
Cianorte (Paraná (state))	1–0	(Pernambuco) Santa Cruz
Fortaleza (Ceará)	1–0	(Rio Grande do Sul) Ypiranga
Luverdense (Mato Grosso)	1–2	(São Paulo (state)) Red Bull Bragantino
América de Natal (Rio Grande do Norte)	0–1	(Minas Gerais) Cruzeiro
Coritiba (Paraná (state))	3–2	(Paraná (state)) Operário Ferroviário

=== Match 41 ===
14 April 2021
19:00

América Mineiro (Minas Gerais)	1–1	(Ceará) Ferroviário
Felipe Azevedo 17'	Report	Augusto 90+4'
Penalties
Sabino (penalty scored); Anderson Jesus (penalty missed); João Paulo (penalty scored); Carlos Alberto (penalty missed); Ribamar (penalty scored)	3–2	(penalty missed) Adilson Bahia; (penalty missed) Augusto; (penalty scored) Mauri; (penalty scored) Madson; (penalty missed) Diego Viana

Estádio Independência, Belo Horizonte
Attendance: 0
Referee: Vinícius Gonçalves Dias Araújo (São Paulo)

=== Match 42 ===
15 April 2021
19:00

4 de Julho (Piauí)	0–0	(Mato Grosso) Cuiabá
	Report
Penalties
Hiltinho (penalty scored); Ted Love (penalty scored); Marcelo (penalty scored); Esquerdinha (penalty scored); Jaílson (penalty scored)	5–4	(penalty scored) Rafael Gava; (penalty scored) Uendel; (penalty scored) Clayson; (penalty missed) Marllon; (penalty scored) Elvis

Lindolfinho, Teresina
Attendance: 0
Referee: Héber Lopes (Santa Catarina)

=== Match 43 ===
14 April 2021
21:30

ABC (Rio Grande do Norte)	1–1	(Rio de Janeiro (state)) Botafogo
Maycon Douglas 11'	Report	Gilvan 90+10'
Penalties
Marcílio (penalty scored); Allef (penalty scored); Marcos Antônio (penalty scored); Janderson Maia (penalty scored)	4–1	(penalty scored) Ricardinho; (penalty missed) Cesinha; (penalty missed) Marcinho

Frasqueirão, Natal
Attendance: 0
Referee: Dyorgines José Padovani de Andrade (Espírito Santo)

=== Match 44 ===
13 April 2021
21:30

CSA (Alagoas)	1–1	(Pará) Remo
Dellatorre 35'	Report	Anderson Uchôa 73'
Penalties
Iury (penalty scored); Bruno Mota (penalty scored); Gabriel (penalty scored); Silas (penalty scored); Silvinho (penalty scored); Vítor Costa (penalty missed)	5–6	(penalty scored) Edson Cariús; (penalty scored) Renan Oliveira; (penalty scored) Marlon; (penalty scored) Rafael Jansen; (penalty scored) Felipe Gedoz; (penalty scored) Wallace

Estádio Rei Pelé, Maceió
Attendance: 0
Referee: Jean Pierre Gonçalves Lima (Rio Grande do Sul)

=== Match 45 ===
7 April 2021
21:30

Bahia	4–1	(Amazonas (Brazilian state)) Manaus
Rodriguinho 2'; Thaciano 10'; Conti 49'; Rossi 60'	Report	Vanílson 36'

Estádio de Pituaçu, Salvador
Attendance: 0
Referee: Rodrigo D'Alonso Ferreira (Santa Catarina)

=== Match 46 ===
8 April 2021
19:00

Criciúma (Santa Catarina (state))	1–1	(São Paulo (state)) Ponte Preta
Philipe Maia 72'	Report	Camilo 59'
Penalties
Pedrinho (penalty scored); Hélder Santos (penalty scored); Claudinho (penalty scored); Eduardo (penalty scored); Marcus Índio (penalty scored)	5–4	(penalty scored) Camilo; (penalty missed) Vini Locatelli; (penalty scored) Paulo Sérgio; (penalty scored) Niltinho; (penalty scored) Ruan Renato

Estádio Heriberto Hülse, Criciúma
Attendance: 37
Referee: Paulo César Zanovelli (Minas Gerais)

=== Match 47 ===
7 April 2021
16:00

Picos (Piauí)	0–1	(Rio de Janeiro (state)) Boavista
	Report	Michel Douglas 18'

Estádio Helvídio Nunes, Picos
Attendance: 0
Referee: Rodrigo Batista Raposo (Distrito Federal)

=== Match 48 ===
15 April 2021
19:00

Avaí (Santa Catarina (state))	2–0	(Paraná (state)) FC Cascavel
Júnior Dutra 45+2'; Giovanni 66'	Report

Estádio da Ressacada, Florianópolis
Attendance: 48
Referee: Diego Pombo Lopez (Bahia)

=== Match 49 ===
7 April 2021
16:00

Juazeirense (Bahia)	3–3	(Rio de Janeiro (state)) Volta Redonda
Daniel Nazaré 54'; Kanu 67', 90+6'	Report	Luiz Paulo 5'; Gabriel Pereira 9'; Alef Manga 17'
Penalties
Clébson (penalty missed); Ian Augusto (penalty scored); Wendell (penalty scored); Rivas (penalty scored); Kesley (penalty scored)	4–2	(penalty scored) Luiz Paulo; (penalty missed) Marcinho; (penalty missed) Alef Manga; (penalty scored) João Carlos

Estádio Adauto Moraes, Juazeiro
Attendance: 0
Referee: Jonathan Antero Silva (Rondônia)

=== Match 50 ===
8 April 2021
21:30

Vila Nova (Goiás)	1–1	(Rio Grande do Sul) Juventude
Pedro Bambú 7'	Report	Eltinho 5' (pen.)
Penalties
Pedro Júnior (penalty scored); Arthur Rezende (penalty scored); Willian Formiga (penalty missed); Celsinho (penalty scored); Henan (penalty scored)	4–3	(penalty scored) Eltinho; (penalty scored) Matheuzinho; (penalty scored) Matheus Peixoto; (penalty missed) Guilherme Castilho; (penalty missed) Júnior Todinho

Estádio Onésio Brasileiro Alvarenga, Goiânia
Attendance: 0
Referee: Caio Max Augusto Vieira (Rio Grande do Norte)

=== Match 51 ===
15 April 2021
21:30

Joinville (Santa Catarina (state))	0–2	(Goiás) Atlético Goianiense
	Report	João Paulo 6'; Danilo Gomes 16'

Arena Joinville, Joinville
Attendance: 49
Referee: Ricardo Marques (Minas Gerais)

=== Match 52 ===
7 April 2021
19:00

Vitória (Bahia)	2–0	(Espírito Santo) Rio Branco
David 48'; Gabriel Bispo 50'	Report

Barradão, Salvador
Attendance: 0
Referee: Thiago Luís Scarascati (São Paulo)

=== Match 53 ===
26 March 2021
21:30

Corinthians (São Paulo (state))	1–1	(Pernambuco) Retrô
Otero 19'	Report	Mayco Félix 84'
Penalties
Fábio Santos (penalty scored); Jô (penalty scored); Léo Natel (penalty scored); Ramiro (penalty scored); Fagner (penalty scored)	5–3	(penalty missed) Gelson; (penalty scored) Neílson; (penalty scored) Guilherme; (penalty scored) Thallyson

Estádio Elcyr Resende de Mendonça, Saquarema
Attendance: 0
Referee: Felipe Fernandes de Lima (Minas Gerais)

=== Match 54 ===
13 April 2021
16:45

Paysandu (Pará)	1–2	(Alagoas) CRB
Israel 43'	Report	Torres 45'; Hyuri 47'

Estádio da Curuzú, Belém
Attendance: 0
Referee: Sávio Pereira Sampaio (Distrito Federal)

=== Match 55 ===
7 April 2021
21:30

Tombense (Minas Gerais)	1–2	(Rio de Janeiro (state)) Vasco da Gama
Daniel Amorim 83'	Report	Gabriel Pec 2'; Andrey 49'

Estádio Antônio Guimarães de Almeida, Tombos
Attendance: 0
Referee: Leandro Pedro Vuaden (Rio Grande do Sul)

=== Match 56 ===
13 April 2021
19:00

Cianorte (Paraná (state))	1–0	(Pernambuco) Santa Cruz
Maurício 65'	Report

Estádio Municipal Olímpico Albino Turbay, Cianorte
Attendance: 0
Referee: Dewson Fernando Freitas da Silva (Pará)

=== Match 57 ===
6 April 2021
21:30

Fortaleza (Ceará)	1–0	(Rio Grande do Sul) Ypiranga
Yago Pikachu 79'	Report

Castelão, Fortaleza
Attendance: 0
Referee: Marcelo de Lima Henrique (Rio de Janeiro)

=== Match 58 ===
1 April 2021
17:00

Luverdense (Mato Grosso)	1–2	(São Paulo (state)) Red Bull Bragantino
Isac 32' (pen.)	Report	Artur 10'; Claudinho 50'

Estádio Passo das Emas, Lucas do Rio Verde
Attendance: 0
Referee: Paulo Roberto Alves Júnior (Paraná)

=== Match 59 ===
14 April 2021
21:30

América de Natal (Rio Grande do Norte)	0–1	(Minas Gerais) Cruzeiro
	Report	Matheus Barbosa 82'

Arena das Dunas, Natal
Attendance: 0
Referee: Jefferson Ferreira de Moraes (Goiás)

=== Match 60 ===
6 April 2021
19:00

Coritiba (Paraná (state))	3–2	(Paraná (state)) Operário Ferroviário
Léo Gamalho 31', 71'; Luiz Henrique 90+1'	Report	Jean Carlo 28'; Tomas Bastos 76'

Arena Joinville, Joinville
Attendance: 187
Referee: Andrey da Silva e Silva (Pará)
