= 2021 Copa do Brasil first round =

Brazilian football competition

The 2021 Copa do Brasil first round was the first round of the 2021 Copa do Brasil football competition. It was played from 9 to 27 March 2021. A total of 80 teams competed in the first round to decide 40 places in the second round of the tournament.

== Draw ==
The draw for the first and second rounds was held on 2 March 2021, 15:00 at CBF headquarters in Rio de Janeiro. Teams were seeded by their CBF ranking (shown in parentheses). The 80 qualified teams were divided in eight groups (A-H) with 10 teams each. The matches were drawn from the respective confronts: A vs. E; B vs. F; C vs. G; D vs. H. The lower-ranked teams hosted the first round match.

Group A	Group B	Group C	Group D
(São Paulo (state)) Corinthians (7); (Minas Gerais) Cruzeiro (10); Bahia (11); (Rio de Janeiro (state)) Botafogo (13); (Rio de Janeiro (state)) Vasco da Gama (16); (Minas Gerais) América Mineiro (17); (Ceará) Fortaleza (18); (Goiás) Atlético Goianiense (19); (Pernambuco) Sport (20); Goiás (21)	(São Paulo (state)) Red Bull Bragantino (22); (Bahia) Vitória (23); (São Paulo (state)) Ponte Preta (24); (Paraná (state)) Coritiba (25); (Santa Catarina (state)) Avaí (26); (Rio Grande do Sul) Juventude (27); (Mato Grosso) Cuiabá (28); (Paraná (state)) Paraná (29); (Alagoas) CSA (30); (Alagoas) CRB (31)	(Santa Catarina (state)) Figueirense (32); (Maranhão) Sampaio Corrêa (33); (Goiás) Vila Nova (34); (Pará) Paysandu (35); (Pernambuco) Santa Cruz (41); (Santa Catarina (state)) Criciúma (42); (Paraná (state)) Operário Ferroviário (43); (Sergipe) Confiança (47); (Mato Grosso) Luverdense (48); (Pará) Remo (50)	(Rio Grande do Sul) Ypiranga (51); (Rio Grande do Norte) ABC (52); (Santa Catarina (state)) Brusque (53); (Minas Gerais) Tombense (54); (Rio de Janeiro (state)) Volta Redonda (55); (Ceará) Ferroviário (57); (Santa Catarina (state)) Joinville (58); (Rio Grande do Norte) América de Natal (59); (Acre (state)) Atlético Acreano (60); (Amazonas (Brazilian state)) Manaus (63)
Group E	Group F	Group G	Group H
(Pernambuco) Salgueiro (64); (Paraíba) Treze (65); (Maranhão) Moto Club (67); (Paraíba) Campinense (72); (Roraima) São Raimundo (79); (Bahia) Juazeirense (81); (Rio Grande do Sul) Caxias (82); (Minas Gerais) Caldense (84); (Acre (state)) Galvez (92); (Rio de Janeiro (state)) Boavista (93)	(Mato Grosso) União Rondonópolis (94); (São Paulo (state)) Mirassol (98); (Tocantins) Palmas (99); Sergipe (102); (Paraná (state)) Cianorte (107); (Federal District (Brazil)) Gama (114); (Alagoas) Murici (123); (Ceará) Guarany de Sobral (125); (Mato Grosso do Sul) Águia Negra (129); (Goiás) Goianésia (130)	(Bahia) Atlético de Alagoinhas (137); (Amapá) Ypiranga (144); (Maranhão) Juventude (150); (Paraná (state)) FC Cascavel (152); (Minas Gerais) Uberlândia (164); (Rio de Janeiro (state)) Madureira (165); (Piauí) 4 de Julho (194); (Espírito Santo) Rio Branco (230); (São Paulo (state)) Marília (no rank); (Rio Grande do Sul) Esportivo (no rank)	(Rio Grande do Sul) Santa Cruz (no rank); (Goiás) Jaraguá (no rank); (Pernambuco) Retrô (no rank); (Mato Grosso) Nova Mutum (no rank); (Pará) Castanhal (no rank); (Amazonas (Brazilian state)) Penarol (no rank); (Piauí) Picos (no rank); (Federal District (Brazil)) Real Brasília (no rank); (Espírito Santo) Rio Branco de Venda Nova (no rank); (Rondônia) Porto Velho (no rank)

== Format ==
In the first round, each tie was played on a single-legged basis. The lower-ranked team hosted the match. If tied after 90 minutes, the higher-ranked team would automatically advance to second round.

== Matches ==
All times are Brasília time, BRT (UTC−3).

Team 1	Score	Team 2
Treze (Paraíba)	0–1	(Minas Gerais) América Mineiro
Porto Velho (Rondônia)	0–1	(Ceará) Ferroviário
Sergipe	0–0	(Mato Grosso) Cuiabá
4 de Julho (Piauí)	1–0	(Sergipe) Confiança
Moto Club (Maranhão)	0–5	(Rio de Janeiro (state)) Botafogo
Rio Branco de Venda Nova (Espírito Santo)	1–1	(Rio Grande do Norte) ABC
Guarany de Sobral (Ceará)	1–5	(Alagoas) CSA
Esportivo (Rio Grande do Sul)	0–2	(Pará) Remo
Campinense (Paraíba)	1–7	Bahia
Jaraguá (Goiás)	1–4	(Amazonas (Brazilian state)) Manaus
Gama (Federal District (Brazil))	1–2	(São Paulo (state)) Ponte Preta
Marília (São Paulo (state))	0–0	(Santa Catarina (state)) Criciúma
Boavista (Rio de Janeiro (state))	3–1	Goiás
Picos (Piauí)	1–0	(Acre (state)) Atlético Acreano
Palmas (Tocantins)	0–1	(Santa Catarina (state)) Avaí
FC Cascavel (Paraná (state))	2–1	(Santa Catarina (state)) Figueirense
Juazeirense (Bahia)	3–2	(Pernambuco) Sport
Castanhal (Pará)	0–3	(Rio de Janeiro (state)) Volta Redonda
Murici (Alagoas)	0–3	(Rio Grande do Sul) Juventude
Atlético de Alagoinhas (Bahia)	0–3	(Goiás) Vila Nova
Galvez (Acre (state))	1–3	(Goiás) Atlético Goianiense
Santa Cruz (Rio Grande do Sul)	0–0	(Santa Catarina (state)) Joinville
Águia Negra (Mato Grosso do Sul)	0–1	(Bahia) Vitória
Rio Branco (Espírito Santo)	2–1	(Maranhão) Sampaio Corrêa
Salgueiro (Pernambuco)	0–3	(São Paulo (state)) Corinthians
Retrô (Pernambuco)	1–0	(Santa Catarina (state)) Brusque
Goianésia (Goiás)	2–3	(Alagoas) CRB
Madureira (Rio de Janeiro (state))	0–1	(Pará) Paysandu
Caldense (Minas Gerais)	1–1	(Rio de Janeiro (state)) Vasco da Gama
Nova Mutum (Mato Grosso)	0–0	(Minas Gerais) Tombense
Cianorte (Paraná (state))	1–0	(Paraná (state)) Paraná
Ypiranga (Amapá)	0–4	(Pernambuco) Santa Cruz
Caxias (Rio Grande do Sul)	0–1	(Ceará) Fortaleza
Penarol (Amazonas (Brazilian state))	1–1	(Rio Grande do Sul) Ypiranga
Mirassol (São Paulo (state))	2–3	(São Paulo (state)) Red Bull Bragantino
Uberlândia (Minas Gerais)	1–1	(Mato Grosso) Luverdense
São Raimundo (Roraima)	1–1	(Minas Gerais) Cruzeiro
Real Brasília (Federal District (Brazil))	0–2	(Rio Grande do Norte) América de Natal
União Rondonópolis (Mato Grosso)	0–1	(Paraná (state)) Coritiba
Juventude Samas (Maranhão)	0–2	(Paraná (state)) Operário Ferroviário

Notes

1. Match finished before the stoppage time ended.

=== Match 1 ===
18 March 2021
18:00

Treze (Paraíba)	0–1	(Minas Gerais) América Mineiro
	Report	Diego Ferreira 90+4'

Amigão, Campina Grande
Attendance: 0
Referee: Sávio Pereira Sampaio (Distrito Federal)

=== Match 2 ===
25 March 2021
15:30

Porto Velho (Rondônia)	0–1	(Ceará) Ferroviário
	Report	Adilson Bahia 83' (pen.)

Estádio de Los Larios, Duque de Caxias
Attendance: 0
Referee: Maguielson Lima Barbosa (Distrito Federal)

=== Match 3 ===
16 March 2021
19:15

Sergipe	0–0	(Mato Grosso) Cuiabá
	Report

Estádio Etelvino Mendonça, Itabaiana
Attendance: 0
Referee: Vinícius Furlan (São Paulo)

=== Match 4 ===
10 March 2021
16:00

4 de Julho (Piauí)	1–0	(Sergipe) Confiança
Caio César 90+2'	Report

Arena Ytacoatiara, Piripiri
Attendance: 0
Referee: Andrey da Silva e Silva (Pará)

=== Match 5 ===
10 March 2021
21:30

Moto Club (Maranhão)	0–5	(Rio de Janeiro (state)) Botafogo
	Report	Pedro Castro 2'; Matheus Babi 30' (pen.); Ênio 51'; Warley 75'; Matheus Frizzo 82'

Castelão, São Luís
Attendance: 0
Referee: José Mendonça da Silva Júnior (Paraná)

=== Match 6 ===
17 March 2021
15:30

Rio Branco de Venda Nova (Espírito Santo)	1–1	(Rio Grande do Norte) ABC
Ivan 20'	Report	Willian Anicete 7'

Estádio Olímpio Perim, Venda Nova do Imigrante
Attendance: 0
Referee: Alinor Silva da Paixão (Mato Grosso)

=== Match 7 ===
17 March 2021
15:30

Guarany de Sobral (Ceará)	1–5	(Alagoas) CSA
Iury 54'	Report	Dellatorre 7'; Fabrício 27'; Rodrigo Pimpão 41' (pen.); Silas 45'; Geovane 56'

Estádio do Junco, Sobral
Attendance: 0
Referee: Fábio Augusto Santos Sá Júnior (Sergipe)

=== Match 8 ===
17 March 2021
20:00

Esportivo (Rio Grande do Sul)	0–2	(Pará) Remo
	Report	Felipe Gedoz 20'; Lucas Tocantins 85'

Estádio Parque Esportivo Montanha dos Vinhedos, Bento Gonçalves
Attendance: 0
Referee: Alexandre Vargas Tavares de Jesus (Rio de Janeiro)

=== Match 9 ===
9 March 2021
21:30

Campinense (Paraíba)	1–7	Bahia
Cadu 17'	Report	Rossi 23', 27', 48'; Kemerson 44' (o.g.); Juninho Capixaba 58', 89'; Gilberto 81'

Amigão, Campina Grande
Attendance: 0
Referee: Dyorgines José Padovani de Andrade (Espírito Santo)

=== Match 10 ===
26 March 2021
15:30

Jaraguá (Goiás)	1–4	(Amazonas (Brazilian state)) Manaus
João Paulo 24'	Report	Vanílson 10', 34', 72'; Guilherme Amorim 85'

Estádio Jânio Moraes, Nova Iguaçu
Attendance: 0
Referee: Douglas Marques das Flores (São Paulo)

=== Match 11 ===
10 March 2021
15:30

Gama (Federal District (Brazil))	1–2	(São Paulo (state)) Ponte Preta
Daniel Alagoano 38'	Report	Apodi 57'; Thalles 83'

Estádio Zequinha Roriz, Luziânia
Attendance: 0
Referee: Zandick Gondim Alves Júnior (Rio Grande do Norte)

=== Match 12 ===
18 March 2021
15:30

Marília (São Paulo (state))	0–0	(Santa Catarina (state)) Criciúma
	Report

Estádio Kléber Andrade, Cariacica
Attendance: 0
Referee: André Rodrigo Rocha (Tocantins)

=== Match 13 ===
11 March 2021
21:30

Boavista (Rio de Janeiro (state))	3–1	Goiás
Vitor Feijão 18'; Michel Douglas 28'; Vitão 76'	Report	David Duarte 66'

Estádio Elcyr Resende de Mendonça, Saquarema
Attendance: 0
Referee: Dênis da Silva Ribeiro Serafim (Alagoas)

=== Match 14 ===
17 March 2021
16:00

Picos (Piauí)	1–0	(Acre (state)) Atlético Acreano
Raphael Freitas 90' (pen.)	Report

Estádio Helvídio Nunes, Picos
Attendance: 0
Referee: Marcos Mateus Pereira (Mato Grosso do Sul)

=== Match 15 ===
25 March 2021
15:30

Palmas (Tocantins)	0–1	(Santa Catarina (state)) Avaí
	Report	Lourenço 57'

Estádio Olímpico Regional Arnaldo Busatto, Cascavel
Attendance: 0
Referee: Gilberto Rodrigues Castro Júnior (Pernambuco)

=== Match 16 ===
18 March 2021
18:00

FC Cascavel (Paraná (state))	2–1	(Santa Catarina (state)) Figueirense
Léo Itaperuna 45+1'; Douglas 50'	Report	Gabriel Rodrigues 41'

Estádio Olímpico Regional Arnaldo Busatto, Cascavel
Attendance: 0
Referee: Daniel Nobre Bins (Rio Grande do Sul)

=== Match 17 ===
10 March 2021
19:15

Juazeirense (Bahia)	3–2	(Pernambuco) Sport
Kesley 2'; Clébson 47'; Dedé 67'	Report	Ronaldo Henrique 12' (pen.); Mikael 21'

Estádio Adauto Moraes, Juazeiro
Attendance: 0
Referee: Ramon Abatti Abel (Santa Catarina)

=== Match 18 ===
17 March 2021
15:30

Castanhal (Pará)	0–3	(Rio de Janeiro (state)) Volta Redonda
	Report	Alef Manga 30', 64'; Régis 90+3'

Estádio Maximino Porpino Filho, Castanhal
Attendance: 0
Referee: Luiz César de Oliveira Magalhães (Ceará)

=== Match 19 ===
16 March 2021
21:30

Murici (Alagoas)	0–3	(Rio Grande do Sul) Juventude
	Report	Matheus Peixoto 45+1'; Guilherme Castilho 46'; Vitor Mendes 85'

Estádio José Gomes da Costa, Murici
Attendance: 0
Referee: Rodrigo Carvalhães de Miranda (Rio de Janeiro)

=== Match 20 ===
17 March 2021
17:00

Atlético de Alagoinhas (Bahia)	0–3	(Goiás) Vila Nova
	Report	Saimon 54'; Pedro Júnior 60'; Markson 90+2'

Estádio Municipal Antônio de Figueiredo Carneiro, Alagoinhas
Attendance: 0
Referee: Héber Lopes (Santa Catarina)

=== Match 21 ===
17 March 2021
17:00

Galvez (Acre (state))	1–3	(Goiás) Atlético Goianiense
Rodrigo 59'	Report	Zé Roberto 32'; Wellington Rato 46'; Danilo Gomes 50'

Arena Pantanal, Cuiabá
Attendance: 0
Referee: Diego Pombo Lopez (Bahia)

=== Match 22 ===
17 March 2021
20:00

Santa Cruz (Rio Grande do Sul)	0–0	(Santa Catarina (state)) Joinville
	Report

Estádio dos Plátanos, Santa Cruz do Sul
Attendance: 0
Referee: Leandro Bizzio Marinho (Paraíba)

=== Match 23 ===
9 March 2021
19:15

Águia Negra (Mato Grosso do Sul)	0–1	(Bahia) Vitória
	Report	David 73'

Estádio Iliê Vidal, Rio Brilhante
Attendance: 0
Referee: Rodrigo Batista Raposo (Distrito Federal)

=== Match 24 ===
10 March 2021
18:00

Rio Branco (Espírito Santo)	2–1	(Maranhão) Sampaio Corrêa
Edu Capetinha 78'; Petróleo 88'	Report	Jefinho 76'

Estádio Kléber Andrade, Cariacica
Attendance: 0
Referee: Graziani Maciel Rocha (Rio de Janeiro)

=== Match 25 ===
17 March 2021
21:30

Salgueiro (Pernambuco)	0–3	(São Paulo (state)) Corinthians
	Report	Jemerson 3'; Ramiro 56'; Mateus Vital 90+4'

Estádio Cornélio de Barros, Salgueiro
Attendance: 171
Referee: Jean Pierre Gonçalves Lima (Rio Grande do Sul)

=== Match 26 ===
17 March 2021
18:00

Retrô (Pernambuco)	1–0	(Santa Catarina (state)) Brusque
Kauê 15'	Report

Arena Pernambuco, São Lourenço da Mata
Attendance: 107
Referee: Alisson Sidnei Furtado (Tocantins)

=== Match 27 ===
27 March 2021
15:30

Goianésia (Goiás)	2–3	(Alagoas) CRB
Du Gaia 41'; Caio Acaraú 85'	Report	Lucão 26'; Torres 46'; Guilherme Romão 60'

Estádio Giulite Coutinho, Mesquita
Attendance: 0
Referee: Douglas Schwengber da Silva (Rio Grande do Sul)

=== Match 28 ===
10 March 2021
15:30

Madureira (Rio de Janeiro (state))	0–1	(Pará) Paysandu
	Report	Denilson 33'

Estádio Conselheiro Galvão, Rio de Janeiro
Attendance: 0
Referee: Antônio Dib Moraes de Sousa (Piauí)

=== Match 29 ===
18 March 2021
17:30

Caldense (Minas Gerais)	1–1	(Rio de Janeiro (state)) Vasco da Gama
Bruno Oliveira 80'	Report	Marquinhos Gabriel 33'

Ronaldão, Poços de Caldas
Attendance: 0
Referee: Vinícius Gonçalves Dias Araújo (São Paulo)

=== Match 30 ===
17 March 2021
16:30

Nova Mutum (Mato Grosso)	0–0	(Minas Gerais) Tombense
	Report

Estádio Municipal Valdir Doilho Wons, Nova Mutum
Attendance: 0
Referee: Ivan da Silva Guimarães Júnior (Amazonas)

=== Match 31 ===
10 March 2021
18:00

Cianorte (Paraná (state))	1–0	(Paraná (state)) Paraná
Sávio 85'	Report

Estádio Municipal Olímpico Albino Turbay, Cianorte
Attendance: 0
Referee: Marielson Alves Silva (Bahia)

=== Match 32 ===
26 March 2021
15:30

Ypiranga (Amapá)	0–4	(Pernambuco) Santa Cruz
	Report	Pipico 32', 69'; Alan Cardoso 43'; Chiquinho 75'

Estádio Giulite Coutinho, Mesquita
Attendance: 0
Referee: Jefferson Ferreira de Moraes (Goiás)

=== Match 33 ===
17 March 2021
20:00

Caxias (Rio Grande do Sul)	0–1	(Ceará) Fortaleza
	Report	David 5'

Estádio Centenário, Caxias do Sul
Attendance: 0
Referee: Ricardo Marques (Minas Gerais)

=== Match 34 ===
18 March 2021
20:00

Penarol (Amazonas (Brazilian state))	1–1	(Rio Grande do Sul) Ypiranga
Henrique Coelho 29'	Report	Jean Silva 45+3'

Arena da Amazônia, Manaus
Attendance: 0
Referee: Emerson de Almeida Ferreira (Minas Gerais)

=== Match 35 ===
18 March 2021
20:00

Mirassol (São Paulo (state))	2–3	(São Paulo (state)) Red Bull Bragantino
Reniê 21'; Moraes 41'	Report	Artur 14'; Ytalo 47'; Cuello 90+2'

Estádio Kléber Andrade, Cariacica
Attendance: 0
Referee: Marcelo de Lima Henrique (Rio de Janeiro)

=== Match 36 ===
11 March 2021
17:00

Uberlândia (Minas Gerais)	1–1	(Mato Grosso) Luverdense
Maílson 25'	Report	Isac 45+1'

Estádio Parque do Sabiá, Uberlândia
Attendance: 0
Referee: Léo Simão Holanda (Ceará)

=== Match 37 ===
11 March 2021
19:15

São Raimundo (Roraima)	1–1	(Minas Gerais) Cruzeiro
Randerson Fininho 8'	Report	Felipe Augusto 53'

Estádio Flamarion Vasconcelos, Boa Vista
Attendance: 0
Referee: Thiago Luís Scarascati (São Paulo)

=== Match 38 ===
11 March 2021
15:30

Real Brasília (Federal District (Brazil))	0–2	(Rio Grande do Norte) América de Natal
	Report	Caxito 53'; Luan Silva 83'

Estádio Zequinha Roriz, Luziânia
Attendance: 0
Referee: Jonathan Antero Silva (Rondônia)

=== Match 39 ===
18 March 2021
17:30

União Rondonópolis (Mato Grosso)	0–1	(Paraná (state)) Coritiba
	Report	Léo Gamalho 22'

Estádio Engenheiro Luthero Lopes, Rondonópolis
Attendance: 0
Referee: Dewson Fernando Freitas da Silva (Pará)

=== Match 40 ===
17 March 2021
15:30

Juventude Samas (Maranhão)	0–2	(Paraná (state)) Operário Ferroviário
	Report	Leandro Vilela 5'; Fábio Alemão 24'

Estádio Municipal Marcos Pinheiro Neto, São Mateus do Maranhão
Attendance: 0
Referee: Wanderson Alves de Sousa (Minas Gerais)
