= 2021 Copa do Brasil third round =

The 2021 Copa do Brasil third round was the third round of the 2021 Copa do Brasil football competition. It was played from 1 to 16 June 2021. A total of 32 teams competed in the third round to decide 16 places in the final rounds of the 2021 Copa do Brasil.

== Draw ==
The draw for the third round was held on 23 April 2021, 14:00 at CBF headquarters in Rio de Janeiro. In a first draw, the 32 teams, seeded by their CBF ranking, were drawn into 16 ties. The home and away teams of each leg were decided in a second draw. CBF ranking is shown in parentheses.

Pot A	Pot B
(Rio de Janeiro (state)) Flamengo (1); (São Paulo (state)) Palmeiras (2); (Rio Grande do Sul) Grêmio (3); (Rio Grande do Sul) Internacional (4); (Paraná (state)) Athletico Paranaense (5); (São Paulo (state)) Santos (6); (São Paulo (state)) Corinthians (7); (São Paulo (state)) São Paulo (8); (Minas Gerais) Atlético Mineiro (9); (Minas Gerais) Cruzeiro (10); Bahia (11); (Rio de Janeiro (state)) Fluminense (12); Ceará (14); (Santa Catarina (state)) Chapecoense (15); (Rio de Janeiro (state)) Vasco da Gama (16); (Minas Gerais) América Mineiro (17)	(Ceará) Fortaleza (18); (Goiás) Atlético Goianiense (19); (São Paulo (state)) Red Bull Bragantino (22); (Bahia) Vitória (23); (Paraná (state)) Coritiba (25); (Santa Catarina (state)) Avaí (26); (Alagoas) CRB (31); (Goiás) Vila Nova (34); (Santa Catarina (state)) Criciúma (42); (Pará) Remo (50); (Rio Grande do Norte) ABC (52); (Bahia) Juazeirense (81); (Federal District (Brazil)) Brasiliense (83); (Rio de Janeiro (state)) Boavista (93); (Paraná (state)) Cianorte (107); (Piauí) 4 de Julho (194)

== Format ==
In the third round, each tie was played on a home-and-away two-legged basis. If the aggregate score was level, the second-leg match would go straight to the penalty shoot-out to determine the winners.

== Matches ==
All times are Brasília time, BRT (UTC−3)

Team 1	Agg.	Team 2	1st leg	2nd leg
Cianorte (Paraná (state))	0–3	(São Paulo (state)) Santos	0–2	0–1
Vila Nova (Goiás)	0–2	Bahia	0–1	0–1
CRB (Alagoas)	1–1 (4–3 p)	(São Paulo (state)) Palmeiras	0–1	1–0
4 de Julho (Piauí)	4–11	(São Paulo (state)) São Paulo	3–2	1–9
Fluminense (Rio de Janeiro (state))	3–2	(São Paulo (state)) Red Bull Bragantino	2–0	1–2
Fortaleza (Ceará)	4–1	Ceará	1–1	3–0
Grêmio (Rio Grande do Sul)	2–0	(Federal District (Brazil)) Brasiliense	2–0	0–0
América Mineiro (Minas Gerais)	2–2 (2–3 p)	(Santa Catarina (state)) Criciúma	0–0	2–2
Avaí (Santa Catarina (state))	1–2	(Paraná (state)) Athletico Paranaense	1–1	0–1
Remo (Pará)	1–4	(Minas Gerais) Atlético Mineiro	0–2	1–2
Corinthians (São Paulo (state))	0–2	(Goiás) Atlético Goianiense	0–2	0–0
Vitória (Bahia)	3–2	(Rio Grande do Sul) Internacional	0–1	3–1
Cruzeiro (Minas Gerais)	1–1 (2–3 p)	(Bahia) Juazeirense	1–0	0–1
Chapecoense (Santa Catarina (state))	3–4	(Rio Grande do Norte) ABC	3–1	0–3
Coritiba (Paraná (state))	0–3	(Rio de Janeiro (state)) Flamengo	0–1	0–2
Boavista (Rio de Janeiro (state))	1–2	(Rio de Janeiro (state)) Vasco da Gama	0–1	1–1

=== Match 61 ===
1 June 2021
19:00

Cianorte (Paraná (state))	0–2	(São Paulo (state)) Santos
	Report	Kaio Jorge 23'; Marinho 79'

Estádio Municipal Olímpico Albino Turbay, Cianorte
Attendance: 0
Referee: Diego Pombo Lopez (Bahia)

8 June 2021
16:30

Santos (São Paulo (state))	1–0	(Paraná (state)) Cianorte
Marcos Guilherme 25'	Report

Estádio Urbano Caldeira, Santos
Attendance: 0
Referee: Gilberto Rodrigues Castro Júnior (Pernambuco)

Santos won 3–0 on aggregate and advanced to the round of 16.

=== Match 62 ===
1 June 2021
16:30

Vila Nova (Goiás)	0–1	Bahia
	Report	Rodriguinho 46'

Estádio Onésio Brasileiro Alvarenga, Goiânia
Attendance: 0
Referee: Jean Pierre Gonçalves Lima (Rio Grande do Sul)

9 June 2021
19:00

Bahia	1–0	(Goiás) Vila Nova
Gilberto 80'	Report

Estádio de Pituaçu, Salvador
Attendance: 0
Referee: Thiago Luís Scarascati (São Paulo)

Bahia won 2–0 on aggregate and advanced to the round of 16.

=== Match 63 ===
3 June 2021
21:30

CRB (Alagoas)	0–1	(São Paulo (state)) Palmeiras
	Report	Willian 41'

Estádio Rei Pelé, Maceió
Attendance: 0
Referee: Ramon Abatti Abel (Santa Catarina)

9 June 2021
19:00

Palmeiras (São Paulo (state))	0–1	(Alagoas) CRB
	Report	Ewandro 5'
Penalties
Willian (penalty scored); Gustavo Scarpa (penalty scored); Lucas Lima (penalty missed); Breno Lopes (penalty missed); Luiz Adriano (penalty missed); Victor Luis (penalty scored); Marcos Rocha (penalty missed)	3–4	(penalty scored) Torres; (penalty missed) Guilherme Romão; (penalty scored) Hyuri; (penalty missed) Reginaldo; (penalty missed) Dudu; (penalty scored) Jatobá; (penalty scored) Diogo Silva

Allianz Parque, São Paulo
Attendance: 0
Referee: Antônio Dib Moraes de Sousa (Piauí)

Tied 1–1 on aggregate, CRB won on penalties and advanced to the round of 16.

=== Match 64 ===
1 June 2021
21:30

4 de Julho (Piauí)	3–2	(São Paulo (state)) São Paulo
Orejuela 9' (o.g,); Gilmar Bahia 45'; Rômulo 65'	Report	Éder 22', 29'

Albertão, Teresina
Attendance: 0
Referee: Zandick Gondim Alves Júnior (Rio Grande do Norte)

8 June 2021
19:00

São Paulo (São Paulo (state))	9–1	(Piauí) 4 de Julho
Luciano 16', 89'; Pablo 22', 56', 82'; Gabriel Sara 30'; Rigoni 62'; Bruno Alves 65'; Chico Bala 73' (o.g.)	Report	Dudu Beberibe 1'

Estádio do Morumbi, São Paulo
Attendance: 0
Referee: Dênis da Silva Ribeiro Serafim (Alagoas)

São Paulo won 11–4 on aggregate and advanced to the round of 16.

=== Match 65 ===
2 June 2021
21:30

Fluminense (Rio de Janeiro (state))	2–0	(São Paulo (state)) Red Bull Bragantino
Fred 60'; Hernández 70'	Report

Maracanã, Rio de Janeiro
Attendance: 0
Referee: Ricardo Marques (Minas Gerais)

9 June 2021
21:30

Red Bull Bragantino (São Paulo (state))	2–1	(Rio de Janeiro (state)) Fluminense
Hurtado 66', 88'	Report	Nenê 60'

Estádio Nabi Abi Chedid, Bragança Paulista
Attendance: 0
Referee: Wilton Sampaio (Goiás)

Fluminense won 3–2 on aggregate and advanced to the round of 16.

=== Match 66 ===
2 June 2021
19:00

Fortaleza (Ceará)	1–1	Ceará
Wellington Paulista 70'	Report	Cléber 9'

Castelão, Fortaleza
Attendance: 0
Referee: Wagner do Nascimento Magalhães (Rio de Janeiro)

10 June 2021
21:30

Ceará	0–3	(Ceará) Fortaleza
	Report	Felipe 21'; David 44', 67'

Castelão, Fortaleza
Attendance: 0
Referee: Bruno Arleu de Araújo (Rio de Janeiro)

Fortaleza won 4–1 on aggregate and advanced to the round of 16.

=== Match 67 ===
2 June 2021
16:30

Grêmio (Rio Grande do Sul)	2–0	(Federal District (Brazil)) Brasiliense
Ricardinho 44'; Jean Pyerre 48'	Report

Arena do Grêmio, Porto Alegre
Attendance: 0
Referee: Alexandre Vargas Tavares de Jesus (Rio de Janeiro)

10 June 2021
15:30

Brasiliense (Federal District (Brazil))	0–0	(Rio Grande do Sul) Grêmio
	Report

Serejão, Taguatinga
Attendance: 0
Referee: Wanderson Alves de Sousa (Minas Gerais)

Grêmio won 2–0 on aggregate and advanced to the round of 16.

=== Match 68 ===
2 June 2021
21:30

América Mineiro (Minas Gerais)	0–0	(Santa Catarina (state)) Criciúma
	Report

Estádio Independência, Belo Horizonte
Attendance: 0
Referee: Leandro Pedro Vuaden (Rio Grande do Sul)

9 June 2021
21:30

Criciúma (Santa Catarina (state))	2–2	(Minas Gerais) América Mineiro
Eduardo 29'; Marcel 50'	Report	Ademir 41'; Rodrigo 72' (o.g.)
Penalties
Jessé (penalty scored); Dudu (penalty missed); Hélder Santos (penalty missed); Marcel (penalty scored); PH (penalty scored)	3–2	(penalty scored) Bruno Nazário; (penalty missed) Eduardo Bauermann; (penalty missed) Leandro Carvalho; (penalty missed) Geovane; (penalty scored) Yan Sasse

Estádio Heriberto Hülse, Criciúma
Attendance: 76
Referee: Rodolpho Toski Marques (Paraná)

Tied 2–2 on aggregate, Criciúma won on penalties and advanced to the round of 16.

=== Match 69 ===
3 June 2021
19:00

Avaí (Santa Catarina (state))	1–1	(Paraná (state)) Athletico Paranaense
Jonathan 74'	Report	Renato Kayzer 35'

Estádio da Ressacada, Florianópolis
Attendance: 58
Referee: Dyorgines José Padovani de Andrade (Espírito Santo)

9 June 2021
19:00

Athletico Paranaense (Paraná (state))	1–0	(Santa Catarina (state)) Avaí
Vitinho 1'	Report

Arena da Baixada, Curitiba
Attendance: 0
Referee: Marielson Alves Silva (Bahia)

Athletico Paranaense won 2–1 on aggregate and advanced to the round of 16.

=== Match 70 ===
2 June 2021
19:00

Remo (Pará)	0–2	(Minas Gerais) Atlético Mineiro
	Report	Hyoran 14'; Fernández 45+1'

Baenão, Belém
Attendance: 0
Referee: Antônio Dib Moraes de Sousa (Piauí)

10 June 2021
19:00

Atlético Mineiro (Minas Gerais)	2–1	(Pará) Remo
Réver 9'; Hulk 51' (pen.)	Report	Romércio 45'

Mineirão, Belo Horizonte
Attendance: 0
Referee: Jefferson Ferreira de Moraes (Goiás)

Atlético Mineiro won 4–1 on aggregate and advanced to the round of 16.

=== Match 71 ===
2 June 2021
21:30

Corinthians (São Paulo (state))	0–2	(Goiás) Atlético Goianiense
	Report	Ronald 9'; João Paulo 20'

Neo Química Arena, São Paulo
Attendance: 0
Referee: Bráulio da Silva Machado (Santa Catarina)

9 June 2021
21:30

Atlético Goianiense (Goiás)	0–0	(São Paulo (state)) Corinthians
	Report

Estádio Antônio Accioly, Goiânia
Attendance: 0
Referee: Caio Max Augusto Vieira (Rio Grande do Norte)

Atlético Goianiense won 2–0 on aggregate and advanced to the round of 16.

=== Match 72 ===
3 June 2021
19:00

Vitória (Bahia)	0–1	(Rio Grande do Sul) Internacional
	Report	Thiago Galhardo 72' (pen.)

Barradão, Salvador
Attendance: 0
Referee: Marcelo de Lima Henrique (Rio de Janeiro)

10 June 2021
21:30

Internacional (Rio Grande do Sul)	1–3	(Bahia) Vitória
Johnny 77'	Report	Samuel 69'; Eduardo 80'; Guilherme Santos 84'

Estádio Beira-Rio, Porto Alegre
Attendance: 0
Referee: Felipe Fernandes de Lima (Minas Gerais)

Vitória won 3–2 on aggregate and advanced to the round of 16.

=== Match 73 ===
3 June 2021
16:30

Cruzeiro (Minas Gerais)	1–0	(Bahia) Juazeirense
Bruno José 63'	Report

Mineirão, Belo Horizonte
Attendance: 0
Referee: Alisson Sidnei Furtado (Tocantins)

9 June 2021
19:00

Juazeirense (Bahia)	1–0	(Minas Gerais) Cruzeiro
Thauan 85'	Report
Penalties
Kanu (penalty scored); Wendell (penalty scored); Ian Augusto (penalty scored); Guilherme Lucena (penalty missed)	3–2	(penalty missed) Rômulo; (penalty missed) Felipe Augusto; (penalty scored) Cáceres; (penalty scored) Adriano; (penalty missed) Matheus Barbosa

Estádio Adauto Moraes, Juazeiro
Attendance: 0
Referee: Rodrigo Carvalhães de Miranda (Rio de Janeiro)

Tied 1–1 on aggregate, Juazeirense won on penalties and advanced to the round of 16.

=== Match 74 ===
2 June 2021
16:30

Chapecoense (Santa Catarina (state))	3–1	(Rio Grande do Norte) ABC
Anselmo Ramon 9'; Mike 34', 69'	Report	Wallyson 65' (pen.)

Arena Condá, Chapecó
Attendance: 49
Referee: Leandro Bizzio Marinho (Paraíba)

9 June 2021
16:30

ABC (Rio Grande do Norte)	3–0	(Santa Catarina (state)) Chapecoense
Marcos Antônio 18'; Wallyson 39'; Éderson 70'	Report

Frasqueirão, Natal
Attendance: 0
Referee: Rodrigo Batista Raposo (Distrito Federal)

ABC won 4–3 on aggregate and advanced to the round of 16.

=== Match 75 ===
10 June 2021
19:00

Coritiba (Paraná (state))	0–1	(Rio de Janeiro (state)) Flamengo
	Report	Rodrigo Muniz 15'

Estádio Couto Pereira, Curitiba
Attendance: 0
Referee: Sávio Pereira Sampaio (Distrito Federal)

16 June 2021
21:30

Flamengo (Rio de Janeiro (state))	2–0	(Paraná (state)) Coritiba
Vitinho 27'; Bruno Henrique 65'	Report

Maracanã, Rio de Janeiro
Attendance: 0
Referee: Caio Max Augusto Vieira (Rio Grande do Norte)

Flamengo won 3–0 on aggregate and advanced to the round of 16.

=== Match 76 ===
1 June 2021
21:30

Boavista (Rio de Janeiro (state))	0–1	(Rio de Janeiro (state)) Vasco da Gama
	Report	Sarrafiore 44'

Estádio Elcyr Resende de Mendonça, Saquarema
Attendance: 0
Referee: Paulo Roberto Alves Júnior (Paraná)

9 June 2021
16:30

Vasco da Gama (Rio de Janeiro (state))	1–1	(Rio de Janeiro (state)) Boavista
Cano 71'	Report	Michel Douglas 13'

Estádio São Januário, Rio de Janeiro
Attendance: 0
Referee: José Mendonça da Silva Júnior (Paraná)

Vasco da Gama won 2–1 on aggregate and advanced to the round of 16.
