= 2021 Copa do Brasil final rounds =

The 2021 Copa do Brasil final rounds were the final rounds (round of 16, quarter-finals, semi-finals and finals) of the 2021 Copa do Brasil football competition. They were played from 27 July to 15 December 2021. A total of 16 teams competed in the final rounds to decide the champions of the 2021 Copa do Brasil.

== Format ==
In the final rounds, each tie was played on a home-and-away two-legged basis. If the aggregate score was level, the second-leg match would go straight to the penalty shoot-out to determine the winners.

== Bracket ==
Round of 16
(Santa Catarina (state)) Criciúma	2	0	2
(Rio de Janeiro (state)) Fluminense	1	3	4
(Minas Gerais) Atlético Mineiro	2	1	3
Bahia	0	2	2
(São Paulo (state)) São Paulo	2	2	4
(Rio de Janeiro (state)) Vasco da Gama	0	1	1
(Ceará) Fortaleza	2	1	3
(Alagoas) CRB	1	0	1
(Paraná (state)) Athletico Paranaense	2	2	4
(Goiás) Atlético Goianiense	1	2	3
(São Paulo (state)) Santos	4	0	4
(Bahia) Juazeirense	0	2	2
(Bahia) Vitória	0	0	0
(Rio Grande do Sul) Grêmio	3	1	4
(Rio de Janeiro (state)) Flamengo	6	1	7
(Rio Grande do Norte) ABC	0	0	0

Quarter-finals
(Rio de Janeiro (state)) Fluminense	1	0	1
(Minas Gerais) Atlético Mineiro	2	1	3
(São Paulo (state)) São Paulo	2	1	3
(Ceará) Fortaleza	2	3	5
(Paraná (state)) Athletico Paranaense	1	1	2
(São Paulo (state)) Santos	0	0	0
(Rio Grande do Sul) Grêmio	0	0	0
(Rio de Janeiro (state)) Flamengo	4	2	6

Semi-finals
(Minas Gerais) Atlético Mineiro	4	2	6
(Ceará) Fortaleza	0	1	1
(Paraná (state)) Athletico Paranaense	2	3	5
(Rio de Janeiro (state)) Flamengo	2	0	2

Finals
(Minas Gerais) Atlético Mineiro	4	2	6
(Paraná (state)) Athletico Paranaense	0	1	1

== Round of 16 ==
=== Draw ===
The draw for the round of 16 was held on 22 June 2021, 16:00 at CBF headquarters in Rio de Janeiro. The 16 qualified teams were drawn in a single group (CBF ranking shown in parentheses).

Group
(Rio de Janeiro (state)) Flamengo (1); (Rio Grande do Sul) Grêmio (3); (Paraná (state)) Athletico Paranaense (5); (São Paulo (state)) Santos (6); (São Paulo (state)) São Paulo (8); (Minas Gerais) Atlético Mineiro (9); Bahia (11); (Rio de Janeiro (state)) Fluminense (12)	(Rio de Janeiro (state)) Vasco da Gama (16); (Ceará) Fortaleza (18); (Goiás) Atlético Goianiense (19); (Bahia) Vitória (23); (Alagoas) CRB (31); (Santa Catarina (state)) Criciúma (42); (Rio Grande do Norte) ABC (52); (Bahia) Juazeirense (81)

=== Matches ===
The first legs were played on 27–29 July and the second legs were played on 31 July–5 August 2021.

Team 1	Agg.	Team 2	1st leg	2nd leg
São Paulo (São Paulo (state))	4–1	(Rio de Janeiro (state)) Vasco da Gama	2–0	2–1
Criciúma (Santa Catarina (state))	2–4	(Rio de Janeiro (state)) Fluminense	2–1	0–3
Vitória (Bahia)	0–4	(Rio Grande do Sul) Grêmio	0–3	0–1
Fortaleza (Ceará)	3–1	(Alagoas) CRB	2–1	1–0
Flamengo (Rio de Janeiro (state))	7–0	(Rio Grande do Norte) ABC	6–0	1–0
Athletico Paranaense (Paraná (state))	4–3	(Goiás) Atlético Goianiense	2–1	2–2
Atlético Mineiro (Minas Gerais)	3–2	Bahia	2–0	1–2
Santos (São Paulo (state))	4–2	(Bahia) Juazeirense	4–0	0–2

All times are Brasília time, BRT (UTC−3)

==== Match 77 ====
28 July 2021
21:30

São Paulo (São Paulo (state))	2–0	(Rio de Janeiro (state)) Vasco da Gama
Rigoni 13'; Pablo 78'	Report

Estádio do Morumbi, São Paulo
Attendance: 0
Referee: Wilton Sampaio (Goiás)

4 August 2021
21:30

Vasco da Gama (Rio de Janeiro (state))	1–2	(São Paulo (state)) São Paulo
Liziero 70' (o.g.)	Report	Rigoni 42'; Benítez 49'

Estádio São Januário, Rio de Janeiro
Attendance: 0
Referee: Anderson Daronco (Rio Grande do Sul)

São Paulo won 4–1 on aggregate and advanced to the quarter-finals.

==== Match 78 ====
27 July 2021
19:15

Criciúma (Santa Catarina (state))	2–1	(Rio de Janeiro (state)) Fluminense
Hygor 39'; Fellipe Mateus 63' (pen.)	Report	Hernández 71' (pen.)

Estádio Heriberto Hülse, Criciúma
Attendance: 92
Referee: Caio Max Augusto Vieira (Rio Grande do Norte)

31 July 2021
16:30

Fluminense (Rio de Janeiro (state))	3–0	(Santa Catarina (state)) Criciúma
Manoel 4'; Gabriel Teixeira 52'; Luiz Henrique 55'	Report

Maracanã, Rio de Janeiro
Attendance: 0
Referee: Felipe Fernandes de Lima (Minas Gerais)

Fluminense won 4–2 on aggregate and advanced to the quarter-finals.

==== Match 79 ====
27 July 2021
21:30

Vitória (Bahia)	0–3	(Rio Grande do Sul) Grêmio
	Report	Ricardinho 30'; Léo Pereira 54'; Diogo Barbosa 90+2'

Barradão, Salvador
Attendance: 0
Referee: Flávio Rodrigues de Souza (São Paulo)

3 August 2021
19:00

Grêmio (Rio Grande do Sul)	1–0	(Bahia) Vitória
Jean Pyerre 45+1' (pen.)	Report

Arena do Grêmio, Porto Alegre
Attendance: 0
Referee: Léo Simão Holanda (Ceará)

Grêmio won 4–0 on aggregate and advanced to the quarter-finals.

==== Match 80 ====
29 July 2021
16:30

Fortaleza (Ceará)	2–1	(Alagoas) CRB
Wellington Paulista 72' (pen.), 77' (pen.)	Report	Nicolas Careca 40'

Castelão, Fortaleza
Attendance: 0
Referee: Paulo Roberto Alves Júnior (Paraná)

4 August 2021
16:30

CRB (Alagoas)	0–1	(Ceará) Fortaleza
	Report	Wellington Paulista 45+2'

Estádio Rei Pelé, Maceió
Attendance: 0
Referee: Sávio Pereira Sampaio (Distrito Federal)

Fortaleza won 3–1 on aggregate and advanced to the quarter-finals.

==== Match 81 ====
29 July 2021
20:00

Flamengo (Rio de Janeiro (state))	6–0	(Rio Grande do Norte) ABC
De Arrascaeta 27'; Gabriel 33', 45'; Bruno Henrique 41'; Donato 74' (o.g.); Michael 84'	Report

Maracanã, Rio de Janeiro
Attendance: 0
Referee: Marielson Alves Silva (Bahia)

5 August 2021
21:30

ABC (Rio Grande do Norte)	0–1	(Rio de Janeiro (state)) Flamengo
	Report	João Gomes 84'

Arena das Dunas, Natal
Attendance: 0
Referee: Ramon Abatti Abel (Santa Catarina)

Flamengo won 7–0 on aggregate and advanced to the quarter-finals.

==== Match 82 ====
28 July 2021
16:30

Athletico Paranaense (Paraná (state))	2–1	(Goiás) Atlético Goianiense
Terans 46', 84'	Report	Zé Roberto 70'

Arena da Baixada, Curitiba
Attendance: 0
Referee: Anderson Daronco (Rio Grande do Sul)

4 August 2021
19:15

Atlético Goianiense (Goiás)	2–2	(Paraná (state)) Athletico Paranaense
Zé Roberto 56' (pen.); Éder 90+6'	Report	Christian 44'; Renato Kayzer 69' (pen.)

Estádio Antônio Accioly, Goiânia
Attendance: 0
Referee: Bruno Arleu de Araújo (Rio de Janeiro)

Athletico Paranaense won 4–3 on aggregate and advanced to the quarter-finals.

==== Match 83 ====
28 July 2021
21:30

Atlético Mineiro (Minas Gerais)	2–0	Bahia
Zaracho 37'; Hulk 74'	Report

Mineirão, Belo Horizonte
Attendance: 0
Referee: Raphael Claus (São Paulo)

4 August 2021
21:30

Bahia	2–1	(Minas Gerais) Atlético Mineiro
Rossi 11'; Juninho Capixaba 45+1'	Report	Vargas 62'

Estádio Joia da Princesa, Feira de Santana
Attendance: 0
Referee: Vinícius Gonçalves Dias Araújo (São Paulo)

Atlético Mineiro won 3–2 on aggregate and advanced to the quarter-finals.

==== Match 84 ====
28 July 2021
19:15

Santos (São Paulo (state))	4–0	(Bahia) Juazeirense
Madson 71'; Lucas Braga 84'; Marcos Leonardo 90+1'; Sánchez 90+9'	Report

Estádio Urbano Caldeira, Santos
Attendance: 0
Referee: Wagner do Nascimento Magalhães (Rio de Janeiro)

5 August 2021
19:15

Juazeirense (Bahia)	2–0	(São Paulo (state)) Santos
Ian Augusto 24'; Thauan 27'	Report

Estádio Adauto Moraes, Juazeiro
Attendance: 0
Referee: Douglas Schwengber da Silva (Rio Grande do Sul)

Santos won 4–2 on aggregate and advanced to the quarter-finals.

== Quarter-finals ==
=== Draw ===
The draw for the quarter-finals was held on 6 August 2021, 15:00 at CBF headquarters in Rio de Janeiro. All teams were placed into a single group (CBF ranking shown in parentheses).

Group
- (Rio de Janeiro (state)) Flamengo (1)
- (Rio Grande do Sul) Grêmio (3)
- (Paraná (state)) Athletico Paranaense (5)
- (São Paulo (state)) Santos (6)
- (São Paulo (state)) São Paulo (8)
- (Minas Gerais) Atlético Mineiro (9)
- (Rio de Janeiro (state)) Fluminense (12)
- (Ceará) Fortaleza (18)

=== Matches ===
The first legs were played on 25–26 August and the second legs were played on 14–15 September 2021.

Team 1	Agg.	Team 2	1st leg	2nd leg
Athletico Paranaense (Paraná (state))	2–0	(São Paulo (state)) Santos	1–0	1–0
Grêmio (Rio Grande do Sul)	0–6	(Rio de Janeiro (state)) Flamengo	0–4	0–2
São Paulo (São Paulo (state))	3–5	(Ceará) Fortaleza	2–2	1–3
Fluminense (Rio de Janeiro (state))	1–3	(Minas Gerais) Atlético Mineiro	1–2	0–1

All times are Brasília time, BRT (UTC−3)

==== Match 85 ====
25 August 2021
19:00

Athletico Paranaense (Paraná (state))	1–0	(São Paulo (state)) Santos
Renato Kayzer 16'	Report

Arena da Baixada, Curitiba
Attendance: 0
Referee: Marcelo de Lima Henrique (Rio de Janeiro)

14 September 2021
21:30

Santos (São Paulo (state))	0–1	(Paraná (state)) Athletico Paranaense
	Report	Zé Ivaldo 78'

Estádio Urbano Caldeira, Santos
Attendance: 0
Referee: Leandro Pedro Vuaden (Rio Grande do Sul)

Athletico Paranaense won 2–0 on aggregate and advanced to the semi-finals.

==== Match 86 ====
25 August 2021
21:30

Grêmio (Rio Grande do Sul)	0–4	(Rio de Janeiro (state)) Flamengo
	Report	Bruno Viana 53'; Michael 84'; Rodinei 90+1'; Vitinho 90+5' (pen.)

Arena do Grêmio, Porto Alegre
Attendance: 0
Referee: Vinícius Gonçalves Dias Araújo (São Paulo)

15 September 2021
21:30

Flamengo (Rio de Janeiro (state))	2–0	(Rio Grande do Sul) Grêmio
Pedro 78' (pen.), 87'	Report

Maracanã, Rio de Janeiro
Attendance: 6,446
Referee: Rodolpho Toski Marques (Paraná)

Flamengo won 6–0 on aggregate and advanced to the quarter-finals.

==== Match 87 ====
25 August 2021
21:30

São Paulo (São Paulo (state))	2–2	(Ceará) Fortaleza
Rigoni 68', 78'	Report	Yago Pikachu 83'; Romarinho 90+2'

Estádio do Morumbi, São Paulo
Attendance: 0
Referee: Wilton Sampaio (Goiás)

15 September 2021
21:30

Fortaleza (Ceará)	3–1	(São Paulo (state)) São Paulo
Ronald 20'; Henríquez 81'; David 90+1'	Report	Gabriel Sara 90+4'

Castelão, Fortaleza
Attendance: 0
Referee: Bruno Arleu de Araújo (Rio de Janeiro)

Fortaleza won 5–3 on aggregate and advanced to the quarter-finals.

==== Match 88 ====
26 August 2021
21:30

Fluminense (Rio de Janeiro (state))	1–2	(Minas Gerais) Atlético Mineiro
Fred 41' (pen.)	Report	Nino 13' (o.g.); Hulk 45+3'

Estádio Olímpico Nilton Santos, Rio de Janeiro
Attendance: 0
Referee: Anderson Daronco (Rio Grande do Sul)

15 September 2021
19:00

Atlético Mineiro (Minas Gerais)	1–0	(Rio de Janeiro (state)) Fluminense
Hulk 55' (pen.)	Report

Mineirão, Belo Horizonte
Attendance: 0
Referee: Raphael Claus (São Paulo)

Atlético Mineiro won 3–1 on aggregate and advanced to the semi-finals.

== Semi-finals ==
=== Draw ===
The draw to determine the home-and-away teams for both legs was held on 22 September 2021, 15:00 at CBF headquarters in Rio de Janeiro.

=== Matches ===
The first legs were played on 20 October and the second legs were played on 27 October 2021.

Team 1	Agg.	Team 2	1st leg	2nd leg
Athletico Paranaense (Paraná (state))	5–2	(Rio de Janeiro (state)) Flamengo	2–2	3–0
Atlético Mineiro (Minas Gerais)	6–1	(Ceará) Fortaleza	4–0	2–1

All times are Brasília time, BRT (UTC−3)

==== Match 89 ====
20 October 2021
21:30

Athletico Paranaense (Paraná (state))	2–2	(Rio de Janeiro (state)) Flamengo
Pedro Henrique 47'; Renato Kayzer 70'	Report	Thiago Maia 14'; Pedro 90+8' (pen.)

Arena da Baixada, Curitiba
Attendance: 9,480
Referee: Luiz Flávio de Oliveira (São Paulo)

27 October 2021
21:30

Flamengo (Rio de Janeiro (state))	0–3	(Paraná (state)) Athletico Paranaense
	Report	Nikão 9' (pen.), 45+7'; Zé Ivaldo 89'

Maracanã, Rio de Janeiro
Attendance: 31,586
Referee: Wilton Sampaio (Goiás)

Athletico Paranaense won 5–2 on aggregate and advanced to the finals.

==== Match 90 ====
20 October 2021
21:30

Atlético Mineiro (Minas Gerais)	4–0	(Ceará) Fortaleza
Guilherme Arana 18'; Réver 26'; Hulk 41'; Zaracho 47'	Report

Mineirão, Belo Horizonte
Attendance: 18,642
Referee: Bráulio da Silva Machado (Santa Catarina)

27 October 2021
21:30

Fortaleza (Ceará)	1–2	(Minas Gerais) Atlético Mineiro
Romarinho 89'	Report	Diego Costa 58'; Hulk 83' (pen.)

Castelão, Fortaleza
Attendance: 9,518
Referee: Vinícius Gonçalves Dias Araújo (São Paulo)

Atlético Mineiro won 6–1 on aggregate and advanced to the finals.

== Finals ==
=== Draw ===
The draw to determine the home-and-away teams for both legs was held on 4 November 2021, 15:00 at CBF headquarters in Rio de Janeiro.

=== Matches ===
The first leg was played on 12 December and the second leg was played on 15 December 2021.

Team 1	Agg.	Team 2	1st leg	2nd leg
Atlético Mineiro (Minas Gerais)	6–1	(Paraná (state)) Athletico Paranaense	4–0	2–1

All times are Brasília time, BRT (UTC−3)

==== Match 91 ====
12 December 2021
17:30

Atlético Mineiro (Minas Gerais)	4–0	(Paraná (state)) Athletico Paranaense
Hulk 23' (pen.); Keno 34'; Vargas 55', 68'	Report

Mineirão, Belo Horizonte
Attendance: 53,181
Referee: Bruno Arleu de Araújo (Rio de Janeiro)

15 December 2021
21:30

Athletico Paranaense (Paraná (state))	1–2	(Minas Gerais) Atlético Mineiro
Jáderson 86'	Report	Keno 25'; Hulk 75'

Arena da Baixada, Curitiba
Attendance: 32,557
Referee: Anderson Daronco (Rio Grande do Sul)
