= 2021 Copa do Brasil =

Tournament details
- Country: Brazil
- Dates: 9 March – 15 December 2021
- Teams: 92

Final positions
- Champions: Atlético Mineiro (2nd title)
- Runners-up: Athletico Paranaense
- 2022 Copa Libertadores: Atlético Mineiro

Tournament statistics
- Matches played: 122
- Goals scored: 299 (2.45 per match)
- Top goal scorer: Hulk (8 goals)

Awards
- Best player: Hulk (Atlético Mineiro)
- Best goalkeeper: Everson (Atlético Mineiro)

The 2021 Copa do Brasil (officially the Copa Intelbras do Brasil 2021 for sponsorship reasons) was the 33rd edition of the Copa do Brasil football competition. It was held between 9 March and 15 December 2021.

The competition was contested by 92 teams, either qualified by participating in their respective state championships (70), by the 2021 CBF ranking (10), by the 2020 Copa do Nordeste (1), by the 2020 Copa Verde (1), by the 2020 Série B (1), by the 2020 Série A (1) or those qualified for 2021 Copa Libertadores (8).

Atlético Mineiro defeated Athletico Paranaense 6–1 on aggregate in the finals to win their second title. As champions, Atlético Mineiro qualified for the 2022 Copa Libertadores group stage and the 2022 Copa do Brasil third round. As Atlético Mineiro also won the 2021 Campeonato Brasileiro Série A, they played in the 2022 Supercopa do Brasil against the 2021 Campeonato Brasileiro Série A runners-up, Flamengo.

Palmeiras were the defending champions, but they were eliminated in the third round.

Hulk (Atlético Mineiro) and Everson (Atlético Mineiro) won best player and best goalkeeper awards, respectively.

== Format changes ==
Starting from this edition, 92 teams contest the competition. Twelve teams advance directly to the third round instead of eleven advancing to the round of 16 as the previous editions. With this change there are only three initial rounds before the round of 16.

== Qualified teams ==
Teams in bold were qualified directly for the third round.

Association	Team	Qualification method
(Acre (state)) Acre; 2 berths	Galvez	2020 Campeonato Acriano champions
(Acre (state)) Acre; 2 berths	Atlético Acreano	2020 Campeonato Acriano runners-up
(Alagoas) Alagoas; 3 berths	CRB	2020 Campeonato Alagoano champions
(Alagoas) Alagoas; 3 berths	CSA	2020 Campeonato Alagoano runners-up
(Alagoas) Alagoas; 3 berths	Murici	2021 Copa do Brasil play-off winners
(Amapá) Amapá; 1 berth	Ypiranga	2020 Campeonato Amapaense champions
(Amazonas (Brazilian state)) Amazonas; 2 berths	Penarol	2020 Campeonato Amazonense champions
(Amazonas (Brazilian state)) Amazonas; 2 berths	Manaus	2020 Campeonato Amazonense runners-up
(Bahia) Bahia; 3 + 1 berths	Bahia	2020 Campeonato Baiano champions
(Bahia) Bahia; 3 + 1 berths	Atlético de Alagoinhas	2020 Campeonato Baiano runners-up
(Bahia) Bahia; 3 + 1 berths	Juazeirense	2020 Campeonato Baiano 3rd place
(Bahia) Bahia; 3 + 1 berths	Vitória	4th best placed team in the 2020 CBF ranking not already qualified
(Ceará) Ceará; 3 + 1 berths	**Ceará**	**2020 Copa do Nordeste champions**
(Ceará) Ceará; 3 + 1 berths	Fortaleza	2020 Campeonato Cearense champions
(Ceará) Ceará; 3 + 1 berths	Guarany de Sobral	2020 Campeonato Cearense first round winners
(Ceará) Ceará; 3 + 1 berths	Ferroviário	2020 Copa Fares Lopes champions
(Espírito Santo) Espírito Santo; 2 berths	Rio Branco de Venda Nova	2020 Campeonato Capixaba champions
(Espírito Santo) Espírito Santo; 2 berths	Rio Branco	2020 Campeonato Capixaba runners-up
(Federal District (Brazil)) Federal District; 2 + 1 berths	**Brasiliense**	**2020 Copa Verde champions**
(Federal District (Brazil)) Federal District; 2 + 1 berths	Gama	2020 Campeonato Brasiliense champions
(Federal District (Brazil)) Federal District; 2 + 1 berths	Real Brasília	2020 Campeonato Brasiliense 3rd place
(Goiás) Goiás; 3 + 2 berths	Atlético Goianiense	2020 Campeonato Goiano champions
(Goiás) Goiás; 3 + 2 berths	Goianésia	2020 Campeonato Goiano runners-up
(Goiás) Goiás; 3 + 2 berths	Jaraguá	2020 Campeonato Goiano 3rd place
(Goiás) Goiás; 3 + 2 berths	Goiás	3rd best placed team in the 2020 CBF ranking not already qualified
(Goiás) Goiás; 3 + 2 berths	Vila Nova	10th best placed team in the 2020 CBF ranking not already qualified
(Maranhão) Maranhão; 3 berths	Sampaio Corrêa	2020 Campeonato Maranhense champions
(Maranhão) Maranhão; 3 berths	Moto Club	2020 Campeonato Maranhense runners-up
(Maranhão) Maranhão; 3 berths	Juventude Samas	2020 Campeonato Maranhense 3rd place
(Mato Grosso) Mato Grosso; 3 + 1 berths	Nova Mutum	2020 Campeonato Mato-Grossense champions
(Mato Grosso) Mato Grosso; 3 + 1 berths	União Rondonópolis	2020 Campeonato Mato-Grossense runners-up
(Mato Grosso) Mato Grosso; 3 + 1 berths	Luverdense^{[a]}	2020 Campeonato Mato-Grossense 3rd place
(Mato Grosso) Mato Grosso; 3 + 1 berths	Cuiabá	7th best placed team in the 2020 CBF ranking not already qualified
Mato Grosso do Sul 1 berth	Águia Negra	2020 Campeonato Sul-Mato-Grossense champions
(Minas Gerais) Minas Gerais; 4 + 1 + 1 berths	**Atlético Mineiro**	**2020 Campeonato Brasileiro Série A 3rd place**
(Minas Gerais) Minas Gerais; 4 + 1 + 1 berths	Tombense	2020 Campeonato Mineiro runners-up
(Minas Gerais) Minas Gerais; 4 + 1 + 1 berths	América Mineiro	2020 Campeonato Mineiro 3rd place
(Minas Gerais) Minas Gerais; 4 + 1 + 1 berths	Caldense	2020 Campeonato Mineiro 4th place
(Minas Gerais) Minas Gerais; 4 + 1 + 1 berths	Uberlândia	2020 Campeonato Mineiro 5th place
(Minas Gerais) Minas Gerais; 4 + 1 + 1 berths	Cruzeiro	best placed team in the 2020 CBF ranking not already qualified
(Pará) Pará; 3 berths	Paysandu	2020 Campeonato Paraense champions
(Pará) Pará; 3 berths	Remo	2020 Campeonato Paraense runners-up
(Pará) Pará; 3 berths	Castanhal	2020 Campeonato Paraense 3rd place
(Paraíba) Paraíba; 2 berths	Treze	2020 Campeonato Paraibano champions
(Paraíba) Paraíba; 2 berths	Campinense	2020 Campeonato Paraibano runners-up
(Paraná (state)) Paraná; 4 + 1 + 1 berths	**Athletico Paranaense**	**2020 Campeonato Brasileiro Série A 9th place**
(Paraná (state)) Paraná; 4 + 1 + 1 berths	Coritiba	2020 Campeonato Paranaense runners-up
(Paraná (state)) Paraná; 4 + 1 + 1 berths	FC Cascavel	2020 Campeonato Paranaense 3rd place
(Paraná (state)) Paraná; 4 + 1 + 1 berths	Cianorte	2020 Campeonato Paranaense 4th place
(Paraná (state)) Paraná; 4 + 1 + 1 berths	Operário Ferroviário	2020 Campeonato Paranaense 5th place
(Paraná (state)) Paraná; 4 + 1 + 1 berths	Paraná	8th best placed team in the 2020 CBF ranking not already qualified
(Pernambuco) Pernambuco; 3 + 1 berths	Salgueiro	2020 Campeonato Pernambucano champions
(Pernambuco) Pernambuco; 3 + 1 berths	Santa Cruz	2020 Campeonato Pernambucano runners-up
(Pernambuco) Pernambuco; 3 + 1 berths	Retrô	2020 Campeonato Pernambucano first round best placed team not already qualified
(Pernambuco) Pernambuco; 3 + 1 berths	Sport	2nd best placed team in the 2020 CBF ranking not already qualified
(Piauí) Piauí; 2 berths	4 de Julho	2020 Campeonato Piauiense champions
(Piauí) Piauí; 2 berths	Picos	2020 Campeonato Piauiense runners-up
(Rio de Janeiro (state)) Rio de Janeiro; 5 + 2 berths	**Flamengo**	**2020 Campeonato Brasileiro Série A champions**
(Rio de Janeiro (state)) Rio de Janeiro; 5 + 2 berths	**Fluminense**	**2020 Campeonato Brasileiro Série A 5th place**
(Rio de Janeiro (state)) Rio de Janeiro; 5 + 2 berths	Botafogo	2020 Campeonato Carioca 5th place
(Rio de Janeiro (state)) Rio de Janeiro; 5 + 2 berths	Vasco da Gama	2020 Campeonato Carioca 7th place
(Rio de Janeiro (state)) Rio de Janeiro; 5 + 2 berths	Volta Redonda	2020 Taça Independência winners
(Rio de Janeiro (state)) Rio de Janeiro; 5 + 2 berths	Boavista	2020 Torneio Extra winners
(Rio de Janeiro (state)) Rio de Janeiro; 5 + 2 berths	Madureira^{[b]}	2020 Torneio Extra runners-up
Rio Grande do Norte 2 berths	ABC	2020 Campeonato Potiguar champions
Rio Grande do Norte 2 berths	América de Natal	2020 Campeonato Potiguar runners-up
(Rio Grande do Sul) Rio Grande do Sul; 4 + 2 + 1 berths	**Internacional**	**2020 Campeonato Brasileiro Série A runners-up**
(Rio Grande do Sul) Rio Grande do Sul; 4 + 2 + 1 berths	**Grêmio**	**2020 Campeonato Brasileiro Série A 6th place**
(Rio Grande do Sul) Rio Grande do Sul; 4 + 2 + 1 berths	Caxias	2020 Campeonato Gaúcho runners-up
(Rio Grande do Sul) Rio Grande do Sul; 4 + 2 + 1 berths	Esportivo	2020 Campeonato Gaúcho 4th place
(Rio Grande do Sul) Rio Grande do Sul; 4 + 2 + 1 berths	Ypiranga	2020 Campeonato Gaúcho 5th place
(Rio Grande do Sul) Rio Grande do Sul; 4 + 2 + 1 berths	Santa Cruz	2020 Copa FGF champions
(Rio Grande do Sul) Rio Grande do Sul; 4 + 2 + 1 berths	Juventude	6th best placed team in the 2020 CBF ranking not already qualified
(Rondônia) Rondônia; 1 berth	Porto Velho	2020 Campeonato Rondoniense champions
(Roraima) Roraima; 1 berth	São Raimundo	2020 Campeonato Roraimense champions
(Santa Catarina (state)) Santa Catarina; 3 + 1 + 2 berths	**Chapecoense**	**2020 Campeonato Brasileiro Série B champions**
(Santa Catarina (state)) Santa Catarina; 3 + 1 + 2 berths	Brusque	2020 Campeonato Catarinense runners-up
(Santa Catarina (state)) Santa Catarina; 3 + 1 + 2 berths	Criciúma	2020 Campeonato Catarinense 3rd place
(Santa Catarina (state)) Santa Catarina; 3 + 1 + 2 berths	Joinville	2020 Copa Santa Catarina champions
(Santa Catarina (state)) Santa Catarina; 3 + 1 + 2 berths	Avaí	5th best placed team in the 2020 CBF ranking not already qualified
(Santa Catarina (state)) Santa Catarina; 3 + 1 + 2 berths	Figueirense	9th best placed team in the 2020 CBF ranking not already qualified
(São Paulo (state)) São Paulo; 5 + 3 berths	**Palmeiras**	**2020 Copa Libertadores champions**
(São Paulo (state)) São Paulo; 5 + 3 berths	**São Paulo**	**2020 Campeonato Brasileiro Série A 4th place**
(São Paulo (state)) São Paulo; 5 + 3 berths	**Santos**	**2020 Campeonato Brasileiro Série A 8th place**
(São Paulo (state)) São Paulo; 5 + 3 berths	Corinthians	2020 Campeonato Paulista runners-up
(São Paulo (state)) São Paulo; 5 + 3 berths	Mirassol	2020 Campeonato Paulista 3rd place
(São Paulo (state)) São Paulo; 5 + 3 berths	Ponte Preta	2020 Campeonato Paulista 4th place
(São Paulo (state)) São Paulo; 5 + 3 berths	Red Bull Bragantino	2020 Campeonato Paulista do Interior winners
(São Paulo (state)) São Paulo; 5 + 3 berths	Marília	2020 Copa Paulista runners-up
(Sergipe) Sergipe; 2 berths	Confiança	2020 Campeonato Sergipano champions
(Sergipe) Sergipe; 2 berths	Sergipe	2020 Campeonato Sergipano runners-up
(Tocantins) Tocantins; 1 berth	Palmas	2020 Campeonato Tocantinense champions

^{a} As the 2020 Copa FMF was cancelled, its 2021 Copa do Brasil berth was awarded to the best placed team in the 2020 Campeonato Mato-Grossense not already qualified, Luverdense (2020 Campeonato Mato-Grossense 3rd place).
^{b} As the 2020 Copa Rio was cancelled, its 2021 Copa do Brasil berth was awarded to the Torneio Extra runners-up, Madureira.

== Format ==
The competition is a single-elimination tournament, the first two rounds are played as a single match and the rest are played as a two-legged ties. Twelve teams enter in the third round, which are teams qualified for 2021 Copa Libertadores (8), Série A best team not qualified for 2021 Copa Libertadores, Série B champions, Copa Verde champions and Copa do Nordeste champions. The remaining 80 teams play in the first round, the 40 winners play the second round, and the 20 winners play the third round. Finally, the sixteen third round winners advance to the round of 16.

== Schedule ==
The schedule of the competition was as follows:

Stage	First leg	Second leg
First round	Week 1: 10 March; Week 2: 17 March; Week 3: 24 March	
Second round	Week 1: 26 March; Week 2: 1 April; Week 3: 7 April; Week 4: 14 April	
Third round	Week 1: 2 June; Week 2: 9 June	Week 1: 9 June; Week 2: 16 June
Round of 16	28 July	Week 1: 31 July; Week 2: 4 August
Quarter-finals	25 August	15 September
Semi-finals	20 October	27 October
Finals	12 December	15 December

== Draw ==
The draw for the first and second rounds was held on 2 March 2021, 15:00 at CBF headquarters in Rio de Janeiro. Teams were seeded by their CBF ranking (shown in parentheses). The 80 qualified teams were divided in eight groups (A-H) with 10 teams each. The matches were drawn from the respective confronts: A vs. E; B vs. F; C vs. G; D vs. H. The lower-ranked teams hosted the first round match.

Group A	Group B	Group C	Group D
(São Paulo (state)) Corinthians (7); (Minas Gerais) Cruzeiro (10); Bahia (11); (Rio de Janeiro (state)) Botafogo (13); (Rio de Janeiro (state)) Vasco da Gama (16); (Minas Gerais) América Mineiro (17); (Ceará) Fortaleza (18); (Goiás) Atlético Goianiense (19); (Pernambuco) Sport (20); Goiás (21)	(São Paulo (state)) Red Bull Bragantino (22); (Bahia) Vitória (23); (São Paulo (state)) Ponte Preta (24); (Paraná (state)) Coritiba (25); (Santa Catarina (state)) Avaí (26); (Rio Grande do Sul) Juventude (27); (Mato Grosso) Cuiabá (28); (Paraná (state)) Paraná (29); (Alagoas) CSA (30); (Alagoas) CRB (31)	(Santa Catarina (state)) Figueirense (32); (Maranhão) Sampaio Corrêa (33); (Goiás) Vila Nova (34); (Pará) Paysandu (35); (Pernambuco) Santa Cruz (41); (Santa Catarina (state)) Criciúma (42); (Paraná (state)) Operário Ferroviário (43); (Sergipe) Confiança (47); (Mato Grosso) Luverdense (48); (Pará) Remo (50)	(Rio Grande do Sul) Ypiranga (51); (Rio Grande do Norte) ABC (52); (Santa Catarina (state)) Brusque (53); (Minas Gerais) Tombense (54); (Rio de Janeiro (state)) Volta Redonda (55); (Ceará) Ferroviário (57); (Santa Catarina (state)) Joinville (58); (Rio Grande do Norte) América de Natal (59); (Acre (state)) Atlético Acreano (60); (Amazonas (Brazilian state)) Manaus (63)
Group E	Group F	Group G	Group H
(Pernambuco) Salgueiro (64); (Paraíba) Treze (65); (Maranhão) Moto Club (67); (Paraíba) Campinense (72); (Roraima) São Raimundo (79); (Bahia) Juazeirense (81); (Rio Grande do Sul) Caxias (82); (Minas Gerais) Caldense (84); (Acre (state)) Galvez (92); (Rio de Janeiro (state)) Boavista (93)	(Mato Grosso) União Rondonópolis (94); (São Paulo (state)) Mirassol (98); (Tocantins) Palmas (99); Sergipe (102); (Paraná (state)) Cianorte (107); (Federal District (Brazil)) Gama (114); (Alagoas) Murici (123); (Ceará) Guarany de Sobral (125); (Mato Grosso do Sul) Águia Negra (129); (Goiás) Goianésia (130)	(Bahia) Atlético de Alagoinhas (137); (Amapá) Ypiranga (144); (Maranhão) Juventude (150); (Paraná (state)) FC Cascavel (152); (Minas Gerais) Uberlândia (164); (Rio de Janeiro (state)) Madureira (165); (Piauí) 4 de Julho (194); (Espírito Santo) Rio Branco (230); (São Paulo (state)) Marília (no rank); (Rio Grande do Sul) Esportivo (no rank)	(Rio Grande do Sul) Santa Cruz (no rank); (Goiás) Jaraguá (no rank); (Pernambuco) Retrô (no rank); (Mato Grosso) Nova Mutum (no rank); (Pará) Castanhal (no rank); (Amazonas (Brazilian state)) Penarol (no rank); (Piauí) Picos (no rank); (Federal District (Brazil)) Real Brasília (no rank); (Espírito Santo) Rio Branco de Venda Nova (no rank); (Rondônia) Porto Velho (no rank)

== First round ==
In the first round, each tie was played on a single-legged basis. The lower-ranked team hosted the match. If tied after 90 minutes, the higher-ranked team would automatically advance to second round.

Team 1	Score	Team 2
Treze (Paraíba)	0–1	(Minas Gerais) América Mineiro
Porto Velho (Rondônia)	0–1	(Ceará) Ferroviário
Sergipe	0–0	(Mato Grosso) Cuiabá
4 de Julho (Piauí)	1–0	(Sergipe) Confiança
Moto Club (Maranhão)	0–5	(Rio de Janeiro (state)) Botafogo
Rio Branco de Venda Nova (Espírito Santo)	1–1	(Rio Grande do Norte) ABC
Guarany de Sobral (Ceará)	1–5	(Alagoas) CSA
Esportivo (Rio Grande do Sul)	0–2	(Pará) Remo
Campinense (Paraíba)	1–7	Bahia
Jaraguá (Goiás)	1–4	(Amazonas (Brazilian state)) Manaus
Gama (Federal District (Brazil))	1–2	(São Paulo (state)) Ponte Preta
Marília (São Paulo (state))	0–0	(Santa Catarina (state)) Criciúma
Boavista (Rio de Janeiro (state))	3–1	Goiás
Picos (Piauí)	1–0	(Acre (state)) Atlético Acreano
Palmas (Tocantins)	0–1	(Santa Catarina (state)) Avaí
FC Cascavel (Paraná (state))	2–1	(Santa Catarina (state)) Figueirense
Juazeirense (Bahia)	3–2	(Pernambuco) Sport
Castanhal (Pará)	0–3	(Rio de Janeiro (state)) Volta Redonda
Murici (Alagoas)	0–3	(Rio Grande do Sul) Juventude
Atlético de Alagoinhas (Bahia)	0–3	(Goiás) Vila Nova
Galvez (Acre (state))	1–3	(Goiás) Atlético Goianiense
Santa Cruz (Rio Grande do Sul)	0–0	(Santa Catarina (state)) Joinville
Águia Negra (Mato Grosso do Sul)	0–1	(Bahia) Vitória
Rio Branco (Espírito Santo)	2–1	(Maranhão) Sampaio Corrêa
Salgueiro (Pernambuco)	0–3	(São Paulo (state)) Corinthians
Retrô (Pernambuco)	1–0	(Santa Catarina (state)) Brusque
Goianésia (Goiás)	2–3	(Alagoas) CRB
Madureira (Rio de Janeiro (state))	0–1	(Pará) Paysandu
Caldense (Minas Gerais)	1–1	(Rio de Janeiro (state)) Vasco da Gama
Nova Mutum (Mato Grosso)	0–0	(Minas Gerais) Tombense
Cianorte (Paraná (state))	1–0	(Paraná (state)) Paraná
Ypiranga (Amapá)	0–4	(Pernambuco) Santa Cruz
Caxias (Rio Grande do Sul)	0–1	(Ceará) Fortaleza
Penarol (Amazonas (Brazilian state))	1–1	(Rio Grande do Sul) Ypiranga
Mirassol (São Paulo (state))	2–3	(São Paulo (state)) Red Bull Bragantino
Uberlândia (Minas Gerais)	1–1	(Mato Grosso) Luverdense
São Raimundo (Roraima)	1–1	(Minas Gerais) Cruzeiro
Real Brasília (Federal District (Brazil))	0–2	(Rio Grande do Norte) América de Natal
União Rondonópolis (Mato Grosso)	0–1	(Paraná (state)) Coritiba
Juventude Samas (Maranhão)	0–2	(Paraná (state)) Operário Ferroviário

Notes

1. Match finished before the stoppage time ended.

== Second round ==
In the second round, each tie was played on a single-legged basis. If the score was level, the match would go straight to the penalty shoot-out to determine the winners.

Team 1	Score	Team 2
América Mineiro (Minas Gerais)	1–1 (3–2 p)	(Ceará) Ferroviário
4 de Julho (Piauí)	0–0 (5–4 p)	(Mato Grosso) Cuiabá
ABC (Rio Grande do Norte)	1–1 (4–1 p)	(Rio de Janeiro (state)) Botafogo
CSA (Alagoas)	1–1 (5–6 p)	(Pará) Remo
Bahia	4–1	(Amazonas (Brazilian state)) Manaus
Criciúma (Santa Catarina (state))	1–1 (5–4 p)	(São Paulo (state)) Ponte Preta
Picos (Piauí)	0–1	(Rio de Janeiro (state)) Boavista
Avaí (Santa Catarina (state))	2–0	(Paraná (state)) FC Cascavel
Juazeirense (Bahia)	3–3 (4–2 p)	(Rio de Janeiro (state)) Volta Redonda
Vila Nova (Goiás)	1–1 (4–3 p)	(Rio Grande do Sul) Juventude
Joinville (Santa Catarina (state))	0–2	(Goiás) Atlético Goianiense
Vitória (Bahia)	2–0	(Espírito Santo) Rio Branco
Corinthians (São Paulo (state))	1–1 (5–3 p)	(Pernambuco) Retrô
Paysandu (Pará)	1–2	(Alagoas) CRB
Tombense (Minas Gerais)	1–2	(Rio de Janeiro (state)) Vasco da Gama
Cianorte (Paraná (state))	1–0	(Pernambuco) Santa Cruz
Fortaleza (Ceará)	1–0	(Rio Grande do Sul) Ypiranga
Luverdense (Mato Grosso)	1–2	(São Paulo (state)) Red Bull Bragantino
América de Natal (Rio Grande do Norte)	0–1	(Minas Gerais) Cruzeiro
Coritiba (Paraná (state))	3–2	(Paraná (state)) Operário Ferroviário

== Third round ==
The draw for the third round was held on 23 April 2021, 14:00 at CBF headquarters in Rio de Janeiro. In a first draw, the 32 teams, seeded by their CBF ranking, were drawn into 16 ties. The home and away teams of each leg were decided in a second draw. CBF ranking is shown in parentheses.

Pot A	Pot B
(Rio de Janeiro (state)) Flamengo (1); (São Paulo (state)) Palmeiras (2); (Rio Grande do Sul) Grêmio (3); (Rio Grande do Sul) Internacional (4); (Paraná (state)) Athletico Paranaense (5); (São Paulo (state)) Santos (6); (São Paulo (state)) Corinthians (7); (São Paulo (state)) São Paulo (8); (Minas Gerais) Atlético Mineiro (9); (Minas Gerais) Cruzeiro (10); Bahia (11); (Rio de Janeiro (state)) Fluminense (12); Ceará (14); (Santa Catarina (state)) Chapecoense (15); (Rio de Janeiro (state)) Vasco da Gama (16); (Minas Gerais) América Mineiro (17)	(Ceará) Fortaleza (18); (Goiás) Atlético Goianiense (19); (São Paulo (state)) Red Bull Bragantino (22); (Bahia) Vitória (23); (Paraná (state)) Coritiba (25); (Santa Catarina (state)) Avaí (26); (Alagoas) CRB (31); (Goiás) Vila Nova (34); (Santa Catarina (state)) Criciúma (42); (Pará) Remo (50); (Rio Grande do Norte) ABC (52); (Bahia) Juazeirense (81); (Federal District (Brazil)) Brasiliense (83); (Rio de Janeiro (state)) Boavista (93); (Paraná (state)) Cianorte (107); (Piauí) 4 de Julho (194)

In the third round, each tie was played on a home-and-away two-legged basis. If the aggregate score was level, the second-leg match would go straight to the penalty shoot-out to determine the winners.

Team 1	Agg.	Team 2	1st leg	2nd leg
Cianorte (Paraná (state))	0–3	(São Paulo (state)) Santos	0–2	0–1
Vila Nova (Goiás)	0–2	Bahia	0–1	0–1
CRB (Alagoas)	1–1 (4–3 p)	(São Paulo (state)) Palmeiras	0–1	1–0
4 de Julho (Piauí)	4–11	(São Paulo (state)) São Paulo	3–2	1–9
Fluminense (Rio de Janeiro (state))	3–2	(São Paulo (state)) Red Bull Bragantino	2–0	1–2
Fortaleza (Ceará)	4–1	Ceará	1–1	3–0
Grêmio (Rio Grande do Sul)	2–0	(Federal District (Brazil)) Brasiliense	2–0	0–0
América Mineiro (Minas Gerais)	2–2 (2–3 p)	(Santa Catarina (state)) Criciúma	0–0	2–2
Avaí (Santa Catarina (state))	1–2	(Paraná (state)) Athletico Paranaense	1–1	0–1
Remo (Pará)	1–4	(Minas Gerais) Atlético Mineiro	0–2	1–2
Corinthians (São Paulo (state))	0–2	(Goiás) Atlético Goianiense	0–2	0–0
Vitória (Bahia)	3–2	(Rio Grande do Sul) Internacional	0–1	3–1
Cruzeiro (Minas Gerais)	1–1 (2–3 p)	(Bahia) Juazeirense	1–0	0–1
Chapecoense (Santa Catarina (state))	3–4	(Rio Grande do Norte) ABC	3–1	0–3
Coritiba (Paraná (state))	0–3	(Rio de Janeiro (state)) Flamengo	0–1	0–2
Boavista (Rio de Janeiro (state))	1–2	(Rio de Janeiro (state)) Vasco da Gama	0–1	1–1

== Final rounds ==
In the final rounds, each tie was played on a home-and-away two-legged basis. If the aggregate score was level, the second-leg match would go straight to the penalty shoot-out to determine the winners.

=== Bracket ===
Round of 16
(Santa Catarina (state)) Criciúma	2	0	2
(Rio de Janeiro (state)) Fluminense	1	3	4
(Minas Gerais) Atlético Mineiro	2	1	3
Bahia	0	2	2
(São Paulo (state)) São Paulo	2	2	4
(Rio de Janeiro (state)) Vasco da Gama	0	1	1
(Ceará) Fortaleza	2	1	3
(Alagoas) CRB	1	0	1
(Paraná (state)) Athletico Paranaense	2	2	4
(Goiás) Atlético Goianiense	1	2	3
(São Paulo (state)) Santos	4	0	4
(Bahia) Juazeirense	0	2	2
(Bahia) Vitória	0	0	0
(Rio Grande do Sul) Grêmio	3	1	4
(Rio de Janeiro (state)) Flamengo	6	1	7
(Rio Grande do Norte) ABC	0	0	0

Quarter-finals
(Rio de Janeiro (state)) Fluminense	1	0	1
(Minas Gerais) Atlético Mineiro	2	1	3
(São Paulo (state)) São Paulo	2	1	3
(Ceará) Fortaleza	2	3	5
(Paraná (state)) Athletico Paranaense	1	1	2
(São Paulo (state)) Santos	0	0	0
(Rio Grande do Sul) Grêmio	0	0	0
(Rio de Janeiro (state)) Flamengo	4	2	6

Semi-finals
(Minas Gerais) Atlético Mineiro	4	2	6
(Ceará) Fortaleza	0	1	1
(Paraná (state)) Athletico Paranaense	2	3	5
(Rio de Janeiro (state)) Flamengo	2	0	2

Finals
(Minas Gerais) Atlético Mineiro	4	2	6
(Paraná (state)) Athletico Paranaense	0	1	1

=== Round of 16 ===
The draw for the round of 16 was held on 22 June 2021, 16:00 at CBF headquarters in Rio de Janeiro. The 16 qualified teams were drawn in a single group (CBF ranking shown in parentheses).

Group
(Rio de Janeiro (state)) Flamengo (1); (Rio Grande do Sul) Grêmio (3); (Paraná (state)) Athletico Paranaense (5); (São Paulo (state)) Santos (6); (São Paulo (state)) São Paulo (8); (Minas Gerais) Atlético Mineiro (9); Bahia (11); (Rio de Janeiro (state)) Fluminense (12)	(Rio de Janeiro (state)) Vasco da Gama (16); (Ceará) Fortaleza (18); (Goiás) Atlético Goianiense (19); (Bahia) Vitória (23); (Alagoas) CRB (31); (Santa Catarina (state)) Criciúma (42); (Rio Grande do Norte) ABC (52); (Bahia) Juazeirense (81)

The first legs were played on 27–29 July and the second legs were played on 31 July–5 August 2021.

Team 1	Agg.	Team 2	1st leg	2nd leg
São Paulo (São Paulo (state))	4–1	(Rio de Janeiro (state)) Vasco da Gama	2–0	2–1
Criciúma (Santa Catarina (state))	2–4	(Rio de Janeiro (state)) Fluminense	2–1	0–3
Vitória (Bahia)	0–4	(Rio Grande do Sul) Grêmio	0–3	0–1
Fortaleza (Ceará)	3–1	(Alagoas) CRB	2–1	1–0
Flamengo (Rio de Janeiro (state))	7–0	(Rio Grande do Norte) ABC	6–0	1–0
Athletico Paranaense (Paraná (state))	4–3	(Goiás) Atlético Goianiense	2–1	2–2
Atlético Mineiro (Minas Gerais)	3–2	Bahia	2–0	1–2
Santos (São Paulo (state))	4–2	(Bahia) Juazeirense	4–0	0–2

=== Quarter-finals ===
The draw for the quarter-finals was held on 6 August 2021, 15:00 at CBF headquarters in Rio de Janeiro. All teams were placed into a single group (CBF ranking shown in parentheses).

Group
- (Rio de Janeiro (state)) Flamengo (1)
- (Rio Grande do Sul) Grêmio (3)
- (Paraná (state)) Athletico Paranaense (5)
- (São Paulo (state)) Santos (6)
- (São Paulo (state)) São Paulo (8)
- (Minas Gerais) Atlético Mineiro (9)
- (Rio de Janeiro (state)) Fluminense (12)
- (Ceará) Fortaleza (18)

The first legs were played on 25–26 August and the second legs were played on 14–15 September 2021.

Team 1	Agg.	Team 2	1st leg	2nd leg
Athletico Paranaense (Paraná (state))	2–0	(São Paulo (state)) Santos	1–0	1–0
Grêmio (Rio Grande do Sul)	0–6	(Rio de Janeiro (state)) Flamengo	0–4	0–2
São Paulo (São Paulo (state))	3–5	(Ceará) Fortaleza	2–2	1–3
Fluminense (Rio de Janeiro (state))	1–3	(Minas Gerais) Atlético Mineiro	1–2	0–1

=== Semi-finals ===
The draw to determine the home-and-away teams for both legs was held on 22 September 2021, 15:00 at CBF headquarters in Rio de Janeiro. The first legs were played on 20 October and the second legs were played on 27 October 2021.

Team 1	Agg.	Team 2	1st leg	2nd leg
Athletico Paranaense (Paraná (state))	5–2	(Rio de Janeiro (state)) Flamengo	2–2	3–0
Atlético Mineiro (Minas Gerais)	6–1	(Ceará) Fortaleza	4–0	2–1

=== Finals ===
The draw to determine the home-and-away teams for both legs was held on 4 November 2021, 15:00 at CBF headquarters in Rio de Janeiro.

12 December 2021
17:30

Atlético Mineiro (Minas Gerais)	4–0	(Paraná (state)) Athletico Paranaense
Hulk 23' (pen.); Keno 34'; Vargas 55', 68'	Report

Mineirão, Belo Horizonte
Attendance: 53,181
Referee: Bruno Arleu de Araújo (Rio de Janeiro)

15 December 2021
21:30

Athletico Paranaense (Paraná (state))	1–2	(Minas Gerais) Atlético Mineiro
Jáderson 86'	Report	Keno 25'; Hulk 75'

Arena da Baixada, Curitiba
Attendance: 32,557
Referee: Anderson Daronco (Rio Grande do Sul)

2021 Copa do Brasil winners
Atlético Mineiro
2nd Title

== Top goalscorers ==
Rank	Player	Team	1R	2R	3R1	3R2	⅛F1	⅛F2	QF1	QF2	SF1	SF2	F1	F2	Total
1	(Brazil) Hulk	(Minas Gerais) Atlético Mineiro			0	1	1	0	1	1	1	1	1	1	8
2	(Argentina) Emiliano Rigoni	(São Paulo (state)) São Paulo			x	1	1	1	2	0					5
2	(Brazil) Rossi	Bahia	3	1	0	0	0	1							5
4	(Brazil) David	(Ceará) Fortaleza	1	0	0	2	0	0	0	1	x	0			4
4	(Brazil) Pablo	(São Paulo (state)) São Paulo			x	3	1	0	0	0					4
4	(Brazil) Renato Kayzer	(Paraná (state)) Athletico Paranaense			1	0	0	1	1	0	1	0	0	0	4
4	(Brazil) Vanílson	(Amazonas (Brazilian state)) Manaus	3	1											4
4	(Brazil) Wellington Paulista	(Ceará) Fortaleza	0	0	1	0	2	1	0	0	x	0			4
9	(Brazil) Alef Manga	(Rio de Janeiro (state)) Volta Redonda	2	1											3
9	(Brazil) Juninho Capixaba	Bahia	2	0	x	x	0	1							3
9	(Brazil) Léo Gamalho	(Paraná (state)) Coritiba	1	2	0	0									3
9	(Brazil) Michel Douglas	(Rio de Janeiro (state)) Boavista	1	1	0	1									3
9	(Brazil) Pedro	(Rio de Janeiro (state)) Flamengo			x	x	0	0	x	2	1	x			3
9	(Chile) Eduardo Vargas	(Minas Gerais) Atlético Mineiro			x	x	x	1	0	0	0	0	2	0	3
9	(Brazil) Zé Roberto	(Goiás) Atlético Goianiense	1	0	0	0	1	1							3

Source:CBF
