= 2020 Campeonato Alagoano =

Campeonato Alagoano
- Season: 2020
- Champions: CRB
- Matches played: 34
- Goals scored: 69 (2.03 per match)

The 2020 Campeonato Alagoano (officially the Campeonato Alagoano Smile 2020 for sponsorship reasons) was the 90th edition of the top football league in Alagoas. It began on 22 January 2020 and ended on 5 August 2020.

The final was played behind closed doors between CSA and CRB at the Estádio Rei Pelé in Maceió on 5 August 2020. CRB won the match 1–0, securing their 31st title.

== First phase ==
Originally, the team with the lowest number of points would be relegated to Campeonato Alagoano Sub 23–Série B 2021, however due to the COVID-19 pandemic in Brazil, the relegation in the 2020 season was canceled by FAF.

Pos	Team	Pld	W	D	L	GF	GA	GD	Pts	Qualification
1	CRB	7	4	1	2	12	4	+8	13	Advance to Semi-finals
2	CSA	7	4	1	2	10	6	+4	13	Advance to Semi-finals
3	Murici	7	3	4	0	8	5	+3	13	Advance to Semi-finals
4	ASA	7	3	1	3	6	8	−2	10	Advance to Semi-finals
5	Coruripe	7	2	3	2	5	10	−5	9	
6	CEO	7	2	2	3	5	6	−1	8	
7	CSE	7	1	4	2	7	9	−2	7	
8	Jaciobá	7	0	2	5	5	10	−5	2	

Source: FAF
Rules for classification: 1) Points; 2) Wins; 3) Goal difference; 4) Goals scored; 5) Head-to-head result (only between 2 teams); 6) Fewest red cards; 7) Fewest yellow cards; 8) Draw.

== Knockout phase ==
=== Semi-finals ===
3 August 2020
16:00

CSA	4–0	Murici
Rodrigo Pimpão 52', 83'; Joaquim 77' (o.g.); Luciano Castán 88'	Report

Estádio Rei Pelé, Maceió
Attendance: 0
Referee: Denis da Silva Ribeiro Serafim

3 August 2020
21:00

CRB	0–0	ASA
	Report
Penalties
Léo Gamalho (penalty scored); João Carlos (penalty scored); Gum (penalty missed); Erik (penalty missed); Felipe Menezes (penalty scored)	3–1	(penalty scored) Leandro Cearense; (penalty missed) Allyson; (penalty missed) Martony; (penalty missed) Eberson

Estádio Rei Pelé, Maceió
Attendance: 0
Referee: Wilton Sampaio (Goiás)

CSA and CRB qualified for 2021 Copa do Brasil

=== 3rd place final ===
5 August 2020
16:00

Murici	2–0	ASA
André 11', 81'	Report

Estádio Rei Pelé, Maceió
Attendance: 0
Referee: Rafael Carlos Salgueiro Lima

=== Final ===
5 August 2020
21:00

CSA	0–1	CRB
	Report	Igor Cariús 45+1'

Estádio Rei Pelé, Maceió
Attendance: 0
Referee: Denis da Silva Ribeiro Serafim

== 2021 Copa do Brasil play-off ==
2020 Campeonato Alagoano third place Murici and 2020 Copa Alagoas champions ASA played a two-legged play-off to determine the third team qualified for the 2021 Copa do Brasil. If tied on aggregate, the penalty shoot-out would be used to determine the winner.

=== Matches ===
9 August 2020
16:00

Murici	2–2	ASA
Etinho 10'; Clayton Carioca 52'	Report	Gabriel 77'; Jayme 81'

Estádio Rei Pelé, Maceió
Attendance: 0
Referee: José Ricardo Vasconcellos Laranjeira

16 August 2020
16:00

ASA	0–0	Murici
	Report
Penalties
Leandro Cearense (penalty scored); Maranhão (penalty missed); Deola (penalty scored); Wander (penalty missed)	2–4	(penalty scored) Souza; (penalty scored) Clayton Carioca; (penalty scored) Tadeu; (penalty scored) Etinho

Estádio Rei Pelé, Maceió
Attendance: 0
Referee: Márcio dos Santos Oliveira

Murici qualified for 2021 Copa do Brasil
