= Dudu (footballer, born 1998) =

Brazilian footballer

Personal information
- Full name: Eduardo Feitoza Sampaio
- Date of birth: 14 December 1998 (age 27)
- Place of birth: Rio de Janeiro, Brazil
- Height: 1.71 m (5 ft 7 in)
- Position: Attacking midfielder

Team information
- Current team: Figueirense
- Number: 8

Youth career
- –2018: Vasco da Gama

Senior career*
| Years | Team | Apps | (Gls) |
| 2018–2021 | Vasco da Gama | 4 | (1) |
| 2020 | → Paraná (loan) | 4 | (0) |
| 2020–2021 | → Figueirense (loan) | 20 | (4) |
| 2021 | → CRB (loan) | 23 | (2) |
| 2021–2022 | CRB | 2 | (0) |
| 2022–2023 | FC Buzău | 19 | (3) |
| 2023–2024 | Shkupi | 28 | (3) |
| 2024–2025 | Hapoel Tel Aviv | 10 | (1) |
| 2026– | Figueirense | 19 | (0) |
- * Club domestic league appearances and goals as of 10 November 2026

Eduardo Feitoza Sampaio (born 14 December 1998), commonly known as Dudu, is a Brazilian footballer who plays as an attacking midfielder for Figueirense.

== Career statistics ==
=== Club ===
As of 12 September 2024.

| Club | Season | League | | | State league | | Cup | | Continental | | Other | | Total | |
| Club | Season | Division | Apps | Goals | Apps | Goals | Apps | Goals | Apps | Goals | Apps | Goals | Apps | Goals |
|---|---|---|---|---|---|---|---|---|---|---|---|---|---|---|
| Vasco da Gama | 2018 | Série A | 1 | 0 | 0 | 0 | 0 | 0 | 0 | 0 | 0 | 0 | 1 | 0 |
| Vasco da Gama | 2019 | Série A | 0 | 0 | 3 (Note: Appearances in the Campeonato Carioca) | 1 | 0 | 0 | 0 | 0 | 0 | 0 | 3 | 1 |
| Vasco da Gama | Total | | 1 | 0 | 3 | 1 | 0 | 0 | 0 | 0 | 0 | 0 | 4 | 1 |
| Paraná | 2020 | Série B | 0 | 0 | 4 | 0 | 0 | 0 | 0 | 0 | 0 | 0 | 4 | 0 |
| Paraná | Total | | 0 | 0 | 4 | 0 | 0 | 0 | 0 | 0 | 0 | 0 | 4 | 0 |
| Figueirense | 2020 | Série B | 20 | 4 | 0 | 0 | 0 | 0 | 0 | 0 | 0 | 0 | 20 | 4 |
| Figueirense | Total | | 20 | 4 | 0 | 0 | 0 | 0 | 0 | 0 | 0 | 0 | 20 | 4 |
| CRB | 2021 | Série B | 6 | 1 | 12 | 1 | 3 | 0 | 0 | 0 | 0 | 0 | 21 | 2 |
| CRB | 2022 | Série B | 0 | 0 | 7 | 0 | 0 | 0 | 0 | 0 | 0 | 0 | 7 | 0 |
| CRB | Total | | 6 | 1 | 19 | 1 | 3 | 0 | 0 | 0 | 0 | 0 | 28 | 2 |
| FC Buzău | 2022–23 | Liga II | 19 | 3 | — | | 2 | 0 | 0 | 0 | 0 | 0 | 21 | 3 |
| Shkupi | 2023–24 | Macedonian First Football League | 28 | 3 | — | | 2 | 0 | 4 | 0 | 0 | 0 | 34 | 3 |
| Hapoel Tel Aviv | 2024–25 | Liga Leumit | 10 | 1 | — | | 0 | 0 | 0 | 0 | 0 | 0 | 10 | 1 |
| Career total | | | 84 | 12 | 26 | 2 | 5 | 0 | 4 | 0 | 0 | 0 | 119 | 14 |
