= David (footballer, born 2000) =

Brazilian footballer

Personal information
- Full name: David da Hora da Conceição
- Date of birth: 9 January 2000 (age 26)
- Place of birth: Salvador, Brazil
- Height: 1.79 m (5 ft 10 in)
- Position: Forward

Team information
- Current team: CRB

Youth career
- 2011–2020: Vitória

Senior career*
Years	Team	Apps	(Gls)
2021–2022	Vitória	42	(8)
2022	Metalist Kharkiv	0	(0)
2022–2024	Fortaleza	0	(0)
2023	→ Juventude (loan)	41	(7)
2024–2025	Coritiba	9	(0)
2024	→ Juventude (loan)	2	(0)
2025–	CRB	10	(4)
2025	→ América Mineiro (loan)	6	(0)
2026	→ Ponte Preta (loan)	27	(2)
- * Club domestic league appearances and goals as of 18 November 2026

David da Hora da Conceição (born 9 January 2000), simply known as David, is a Brazilian professional footballer who plays as a forward for CRB.

== Career ==
David was born in Salvador, Bahia, and joined Vitória's youth setup at the age of 11, after a trial in his neighborhood. He made his first team debut on 17 February 2021, starting and scoring his team's second in a 3–3 Campeonato Baiano away draw against UNIRB.

David became a regular starter for Vitória during the season, and renewed his contract until 2024 on 1 May 2021. On 23 October, he scored a brace in a 4–0 home routing of Brasil de Pelotas, and also scored twice on 14 November in a 3–0 home win over Cruzeiro. He finished the season with 11 goals, being the club's top goalscorer but being unable to avoid team relegation.

In March 2022, Vitória accepted an offer of €1.2 million from Ukrainian side Metalist Kharkiv for David. However, he asked to leave his new club in the following month, and signed a four-year contract with Fortaleza on 6 May, being initially assigned to the under-23 squad.

== Career statistics ==
As of 13 October 2021

Appearances and goals by club, season and competition
Club	Season	League			State League		Cup		Continental		Other		Total	
Club	Season	Division	Apps	Goals	Apps	Goals	Apps	Goals	Apps	Goals	Apps	Goals	Apps	Goals
Vitória	2021	Série B	34	6	7	2	6	2	—		12 (Note: Appearance(s) in Copa do Nordeste)	1	59	11
Vitória	2022	Série B	0	0	1	0	0	0	—		0	0	1	0
Vitória	Total		34	6	8	2	6	2	—		12	1	60	11
Fortaleza	2022	Série A	0	0	—		0	0	0	0	—		0	0
Career total			34	6	8	2	6	2	0	0	12	1	60	11
