= Anderson Daronco =

Brazilian association football referee (born 1981)

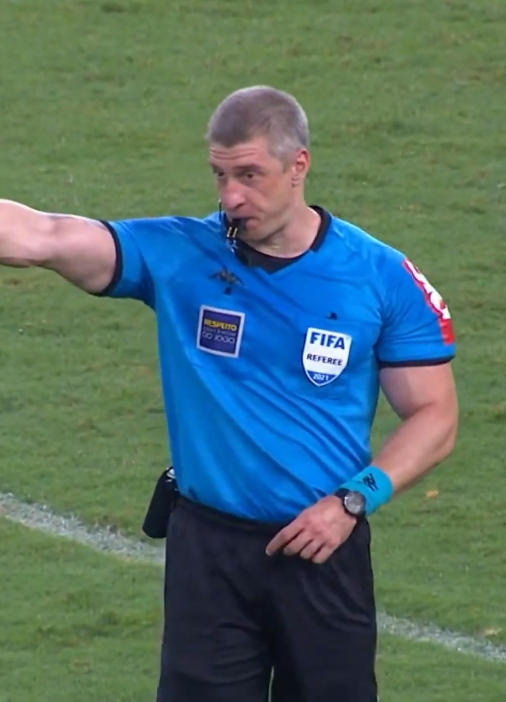
- Born: 5 January 1981 (age 45); Santa Maria, RS, Brazil
- Other occupation: Handball player, physical education instructor

International
Years	League	Role
2015–	FIFA Listed	Referee

Anderson Daronco (born 5 January 1981) is an association football referee. He has worked as a referee in the Campeonato Gaúcho, the Copa Libertadores, Brasileirão Série A and the Copa do Brasil.

== Early life ==
Anderson Daronco played handball from ten to twenty-one years. In 1998 he entered the Faculty of Physical Education.

He underwent a referee course at the Federação Paranaense de Futebol and later had to quit his career as a physical education teacher to devote more time to refereeing.

On 17 October 2010, he became a FIFA referee, making him the third Gaucho member to join the FIFA referee group, along with Leandro Pedro Vuaden. He revealed that he aspires to one day officiate a World Cup. He was selected to take part in the 2014 FIFA World Cup.

== Career ==
During the 2016 Campeonato Paranaense, a photo and false news involving Daronco went viral. To verify the evidence, newspaper GaúchaZH (a subsidiary of Zero Hora) had Professor Robert Tieztman, coordinator of the ViDiCa Cultura Audiovisual Digital research group at the Pontifical Catholic University of Rio Grande do Sul (PUCRS), study the images. He proved that the news was false through a video showing five "grotesque" errors between the original and the fake photo.

In January 2019, Daronco reported that the director of the Paraná, Ademir Bertoglio, uttered several curses against him and his referee team during the game. Later, a fan wearing a Veranópolis shirt also invaded the locker rooms, cursed and threatened the referees with death.

The Court of Sports Justice of Rio Grande do Sul (TJD-RS) studied the case and denounced the VEC due to the threats directed at the arbitrators. In an article written for GauchaZH, journalist Diori Vasconcelos said that there are no reasons to justify the threats directed at referees and that some strong measures should be taken by the Gaucho Football Federation. "Things went beyond all limits, not only because of what happened in Veranópolis. We are experiencing a lot Gauchão in which the president of Pelotas was punched in the face of a 'fan.' What else will need to happen for action to be taken?"

In July 2019, the incident and his life was used as one of the themes of a series of parodies by Marcelo Adnet, Soy loco por Copa América, showcased on Rede Globo, which depicted that Daronco does not accept insults, and that his stature and athletic appearance cemented his reputation as a "strong judge". In August 2019, Daronco stopped a game between Flamengo and Santos due to homophobic screams uttered by Flamengo fans. The posture was praised by the Brazilian Football Confederation. It was the first time that a football match was interrupted in Brazil due to homophobic chants.

Later, Daronco explained that the reason of stopping the game "is not something in my head. We have an orientation in this direction. (…) we don't just stick to a homophobic chant, there's a whole issue involving racism, or facts that can incite violence, such as banners in the field and xenophobic chants."

On August 30, 2020, after a game featuring Athletico Paranaense versus Londrina game, comments about Daronco's stature and physical presence went viral on social media, gaining coverage in Spanish-language press.

On March 27, 2022, after an international football match between Peru and Uruguay, Peruvian newspaper El Comercio and other international media outlets criticized Daronco for a supposed history of refereeing favorably for the Uruguayan side. According to sports journalist Marco Quilca Leon, Daronco declined to use goal-line technology after a highly controversial play at the 92nd minute, where it seemed that Uruguay goalkeeper Sergio Rochet stopped a ball inside his own goal. The Peruvian Football Federation filed an official complaint against Daronco to FIFA after the match.

On 26 November 2024, at Arena Castelão, shortly before a match between Ceará and Vasco da Gama for the 36th round of the 2024 Campeonato Brasileiro Série A, a man in the Fortaleza supporters' area of the stands shouted, "you're not gonna rob [us] tonight, [you] thief", to which Daronco replied with a Portuguese-language equivalent of "go fuck yourself".

== Personal life ==
He is married to Luciane Daronco. He has two children, Arthur and Hector Daronco. He keeps his family life private from the public due to the stated risks related to being a referee.

Daronco was born and lives in Maria, Rio Grande do Sul, where some of his Physical Education students died in the Kiss nightclub fire in 2013 when he was a PE instructor and teacher. In 2015, during the 2015 Brazilian Nationals, Daronco was involved in 27 matches, setting a record of the highest matches officiated in Brazil within that period. In the process, he received an amount of 100,000 reals, the highest amount. In 2017, he referred 21 matches, again the most from Rio Grande do Sul, which also translated to 84,000 reals. Daronco stated that his passion for the sport made him muscular even though that was not his intention.

In 2017, he weighed 90 kg, after losing around 3 or 4 kg, due to the advice of committees and physical instructors who cautioned and advised him to reduce the extra weight to avoid problems in his career in the short and long term. With his weight he is able to run 40 meters in less than six seconds and trains practically every day due to his job.
