= Diego Torres (footballer, born 1990) =

Argentine footballer

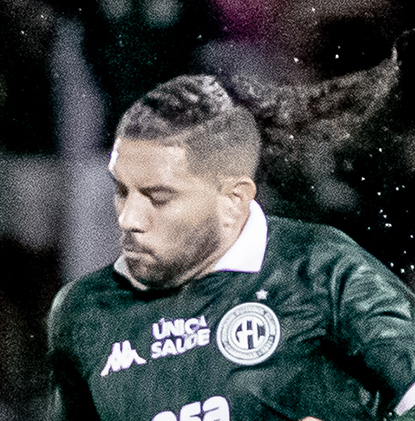
- Torres playing for Guarani in 2026

Personal information
- Full name: Diego Fabián Torres
- Date of birth: 6 November 1990 (age 36)
- Place of birth: Buenos Aires, Argentina
- Height: 1.74 m (5 ft 9 in)
- Position: Midfielder

Team information
- Current team: Guarani
- Number: 10

Youth career
- Chacarita Juniors

Senior career*
Years	Team	Apps	(Gls)
2008–2011	Chacarita Juniors	2	(0)
2011–2013	Alumni (VM)	17	(0)
2013–2015	Estudiantes (BA)	76	(20)
2016–2018	Deportes Iquique	72	(14)
2018–2019	Chapecoense	30	(3)
2020–2022	CRB	51	(7)
2022	Novorizontino	27	(3)
2023	Vitória	5	(0)
2023–2024	Amazonas	45	(3)
2025	Vila Nova	21	(0)
2025–	Guarani	26	(3)
- * Club domestic league appearances and goals as of 10 November 2026

Diego Fabián Torres (born 6 November 1990) is an Argentine footballer who plays for Brazilian club Guarani as a midfielder.

== Honours ==
Amazonas

- Campeonato Brasileiro Série C: 2023

Vitória

- Campeonato Brasileiro Série B: 2023
