= Estádio Rei Pelé =

Multi-purpose stadium in Maceió, Brazil

- Trapichão
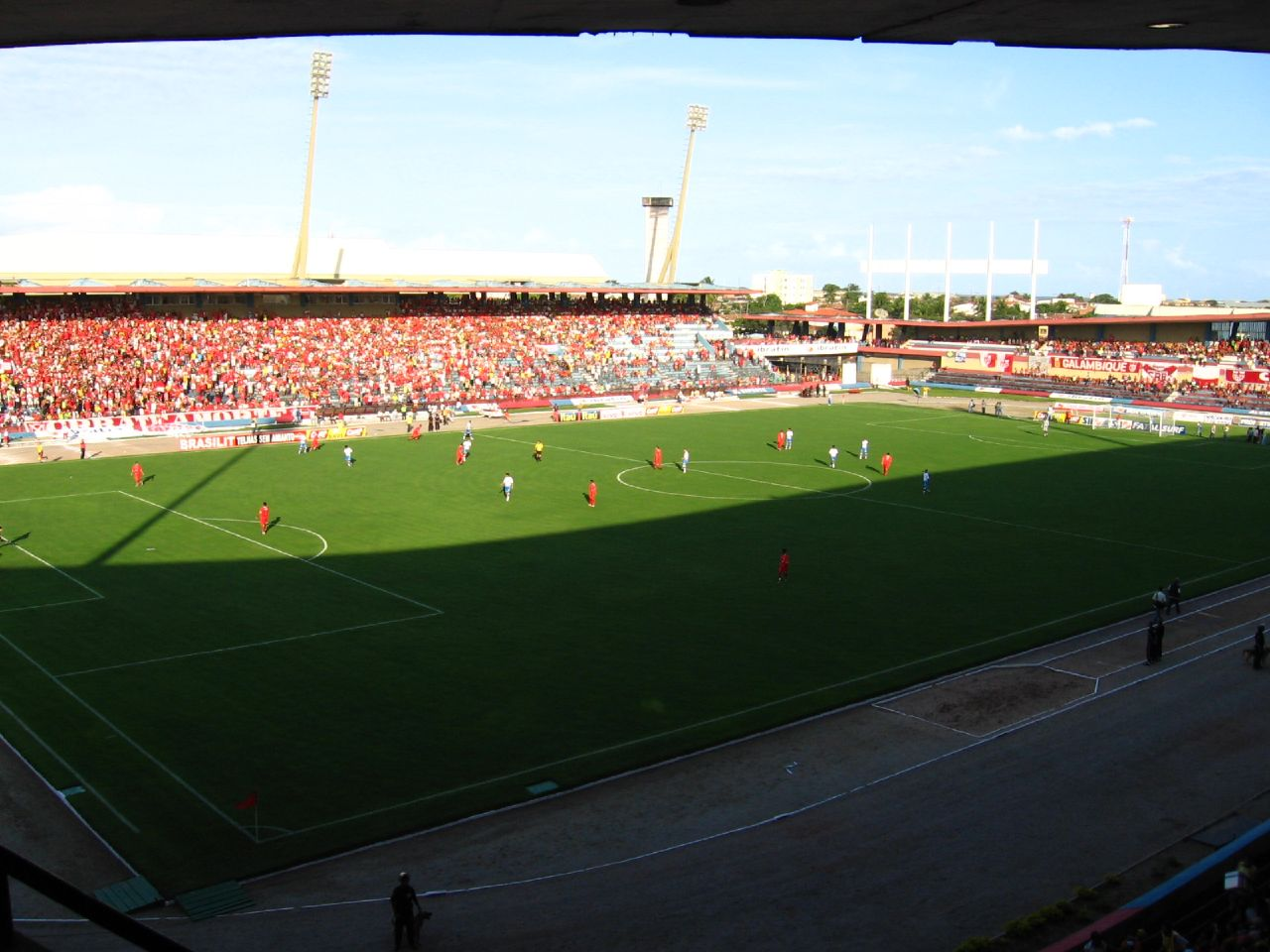
- Sisbrace
- Interactive map of Estádio Rei Pelé
- Full name: Estádio Rei Pelé
- Location: Maceió, Alagoas
- Coordinates: 9°40′14″S 35°45′33″W
- Owner: Alagoas state government
- Capacity: 19,105
- Field size: 110m x 75 metres

Construction
- Built: 1970
- Opened: 25 October 1970
- Renovated: 1992

Tenants
- Clube de Regatas Brasil; Centro Sportivo Alagoano

The Estádio Rei Pelé, also known as Trapichão, is a multi-purpose stadium in Maceió, Brazil. It is currently used mostly for football matches. The stadium holds 19,105. The stadium was built in 1970.

Estádio Rei Pelé is owned by the Government of Alagoas and it is the stadium where CRB (Clube de Regatas Brasil) and CSA (Centro Sportivo Alagoano) play their home matches. The stadium is named after the footballer Pelé (1940–2022), and its name means King Pelé. The stadium is nicknamed Trapichão because it is located in Trapiche da Barra neighborhood.

There is a museum inside the stadium, called Museu de Esportes Edvaldo Santa Rosa, named after an Alagoan footballer nicknamed Dida (1934–2002), who played for Clube de Regatas do Flamengo and the Brazil national football team.

== History ==
In 1970, Estádio Rei Pelé was completed. The inaugural match was played on 25 October of that year, when Santos beat an Alagoas State All-Stars 5–0. The first goal of the stadium was scored by Santos' Douglas. The stadium's attendance record currently stands at 45,865, set on the inaugural match. In 2017, the first national title for Centro Sportivo Alagoano was won at the Trapichão. 17,809 fans witnessed a 0-0 draw in the return leg of the Serie C final between CSA and Fortaleza.
