= Federação de Futebol do Estado do Rio de Janeiro =

Brazilian sport association

- Formation: 29 September 1978; 48 years ago
- Type: List of international sport federations
- Headquarters: Rio de Janeiro, Rio de Janeiro, Brazil
- Official language: Portuguese
- President: Rubens Lopes
- Website: fferj.com.br

The Federação de Futebol do Estado do Rio de Janeiro (English: Football Federation of the State of Rio de Janeiro), usually known by the acronyms FERJ and FFERJ, manages all the official football tournaments within the state of Rio de Janeiro including the Campeonato Carioca, the Campeonato Carioca Série B1, the Copa Rio, and the Campeonato Carioca de Futebol Feminino. It was founded in 1978.

== History ==
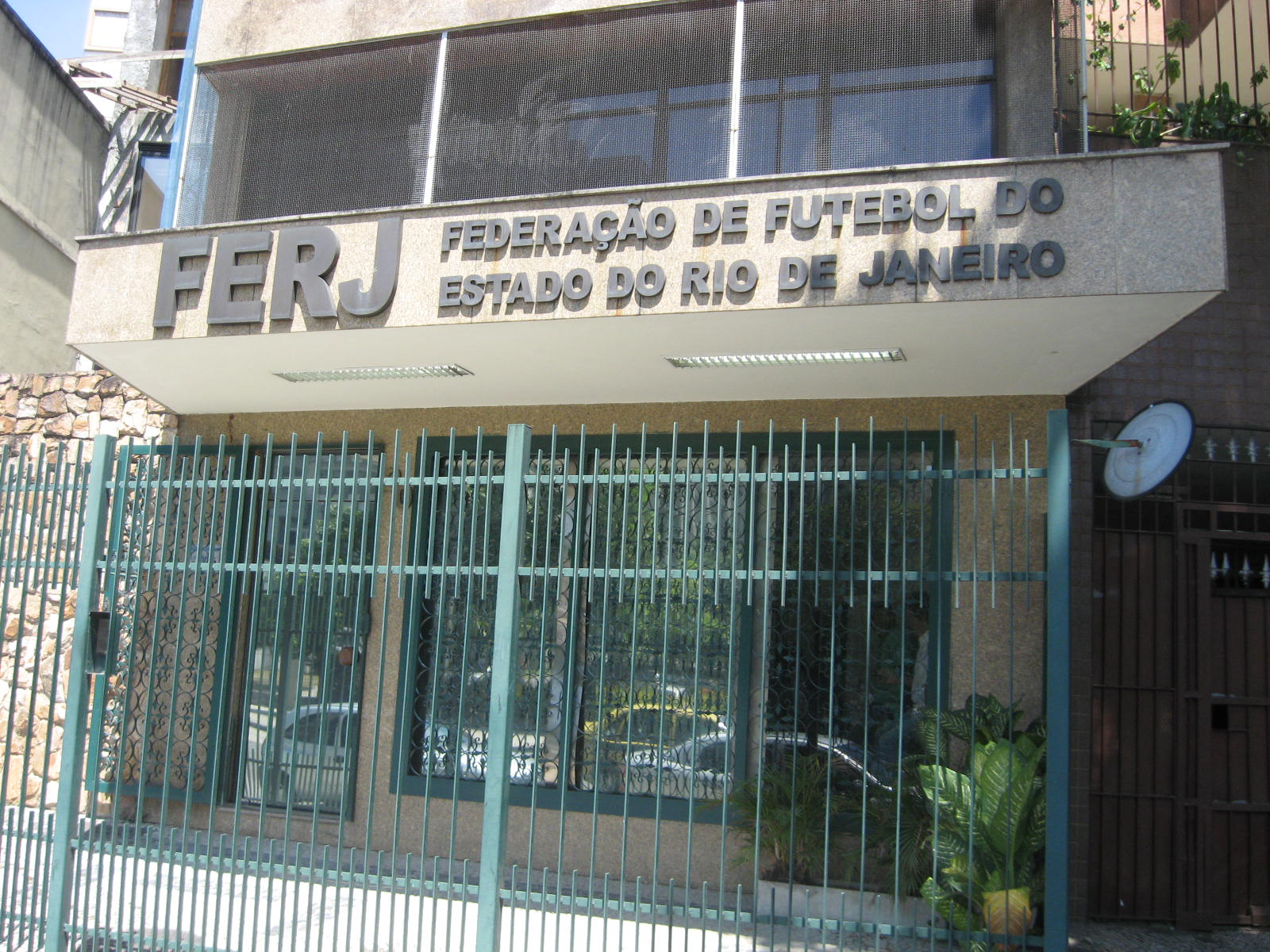
Seat of the FERJ in Maracanã

On March 15, 1975, the states of Guanabara, which consisted essentially only of the city of Rio de Janeiro and until 1960 the federal capital district of Brasil, and Rio de Janeiro, the non-metropolitan area of the state of Rio de Janeiro were merged into the current State of Rio de Janeiro. On September 29, 1978, the Federação de Futebol do Estado do Rio de Janeiro was founded by the merger of the Federação Carioca de Futebol (Carioca Football Federation, FCF) in the state of Guanabara and the Federação Fluminense de Desportos (Fluminense Sports Federation, FFD) in the state of Rio de Janeiro. Octávio Pinto Guimarães, who was FCF's president, was chosen as FERJ's first president.

In 1979, the Federação de Futebol do Estado do Rio de Janeiro organized two different state championships, both won by Flamengo. Those competitions were the first competitions organized by FERJ.

== Presidents ==
	Name	Term start	Term end
1.	Octávio Pinto Guimarães	1978	1985
2.	Eduardo Viana	1985	2006
3.	Rubens Lopes da Costa Filho	2006	2014

== Current clubs in Brasileirão ==
As of 2024 season. Common team names are noted in bold.

Club	City
Série A
Botafogo	Rio de Janeiro
Flamengo	Rio de Janeiro
Fluminense	Rio de Janeiro
Vasco da Gama	Rio de Janeiro
Série C
Volta Redonda	Volta Redonda
Série D
Audax Rio	Angra dos Reis
Portuguesa	Rio de Janeiro
Nova Iguaçu	Nova Iguaçu

== See also ==
- Confederação Brasileira de Futebol
- Campeonato Carioca
- Campeonato Carioca Second Division
- Campeonato Carioca Third Division
