= Federação Mineira de Futebol =

Brazilian association football organisation

- Formation: 5 March 1915; 111 years ago
- Type: List of international sport federations
- Headquarters: Belo Horizonte, MG, Brazil
- Official language: Portuguese
- President: Paulo Schettino
- Website: fmf.com.br

The Federação Mineira de Futebol (English: Football Association of Minas Gerais state) is the entity that controls football practice in the state of Minas Gerais, and represents the clubs at the Brazilian Football Confederation (CBF). It organizes the Campeonato Mineiro, the Campeonato Mineiro Módulo II and the Campeonato Mineiro Segunda Divisão.

== Current clubs in Brasileirão ==
As of 2024 season. Common team names are noted in bold.

Club	City
**Série A**
**América**	Belo Horizonte
**Atlético Mineiro**	Belo Horizonte
**Cruzeiro**	Belo Horizonte
**Série B**
**Tombense**	Tombos
**Série C**
None
**Série D**
**Caldense**	Poços de Caldas
**Pouso Alegre**	Pouso Alegre
**URT**	Patos de Minas
