= Federação Paranaense de Futebol =

Brazilian football state federation

- Formation: 4 August 1937; 89 years ago
- Type: List of international sport federations
- Headquarters: Curitiba, Paraná, Brazil
- Official language: Portuguese
- President: Hélio Pereira Cury
- Website: federacaopr.com.br

The Federação Paranaense de Futebol (English: Football Association of Paraná state) was founded on 4 August 1937, and it manages all the official football tournaments within the state of Paraná, which are the Campeonato Paranaense, the Campeonato Paranaense lower levels and the Copa Paraná, and represents the clubs at the Brazilian Football Confederation (CBF).

== Current clubs in Brasileirão ==
As of 2022 season. Common team names are noted in bold.

Club	City
**Série A**
**Athletico Paranaense**	Curitiba
**Coritiba**	Curitiba
**Série B**
**Londrina**	Londrina
**Operário**	Ponta Grossa
**Série C**
None
**Série D**
**Azuriz**	Pato Branco
**FC Cascavel**	Cascavel
**Cianorte**	Cianorte
**Paraná**	Curitiba
