= 2024 Clube do Remo season =

2024 season of Brazilian association football team

Remo
2024 season
- President: Antônio Carlos Teixeira
- Head coach: Ricardo Catalá (until 28 February 2024); Gustavo Morínigo (until 20 May 2024); Rodrigo Santana
- Stadium: Baenão; Mangueirão
- Campeonato Brasileiro Série C: 4th (promoted)
- Campeonato Paraense: 2nd
- Copa do Brasil: First round
- Copa Verde: Semi-finals
- Highest home attendance: 54,864 v São Bernardo (29 September 2024, Série C)
- Lowest home attendance: 3,718 v Ferroviário (29 June 2024, Série C)
Home colors	Away colors

The 2024 season was the 111th in Remo's existence. This season Remo participated in the Campeonato Brasileiro Série C, the Campeonato Paraense, the Copa do Brasil and the Copa Verde.

Remo won promotion to the Campeonato Brasileiro Série B after finishing second in Group B of the second stage (4th in the overall standings). The club hadn't played in the second division since 2021, when they were relegated. In the Campeonato Paraense, the club finished second after losing the final to Paysandu 3–1 on aggregate.

In the Copa do Brasil, Remo were eliminated in the first round after losing 1–0 to Porto Velho. In the Copa Verde, they were eliminated in the semi-finals after drawing 1–1 on aggregate with Paysandu and losing 4–3 on penalties.

== Players ==
=== Squad information ===
As of 6 October 2024

Notes:

- Numbers in parentheses denote appearances as substitute.
- Y – Youth players to have featured in a first-team appearance for Remo.

Squad Number	Position	Nat.	Name	Date of Birth (Age)		
Squad Number	Position	Nat.	Name	Date of Birth (Age)	Apps	Goals
2	DF	BRA	Diogo Batista	29 August 2003 (aged 21)	18	1
3	DF	BRA	Sheldon	22 April 1999 (aged 25)	3 (2)	0
4	DF	BRA	Bruno Bispo	6 June 1996 (aged 28)	18 (11)	2
5	MF	BRA	João Afonso	9 February 1995 (aged 29)	11 (2)	0
6	DF	BRA	Sávio	26 May 1995 (aged 29)	8	0
7	MF	BRA	Giovanni Pavani	22 November 1996 (aged 27)	35 (5)	3
8	MF	BRA	Bruno Silva	3 August 1986 (aged 38)	7	0
9	FW	BRA	Ribamar	21 May 1997 (aged 27)	17 (19)	3
10	MF	BRA	Matheus Anjos	21 December 1998 (aged 25)	5 (16)	0
11	FW	BRA	Pedro Vitor	20 March 1998 (aged 26)	11 (8)	3
12	DF	BRA	Raimar	27 May 2002 (aged 22)	26 (5)	2
14	DF	BRA	Jonílson	18 January 2002 (aged 22)	7 (2)	0
15	FW	BRA	Ronald	10 August 2002 (aged 22)	4 (17)	2
16	MF	BRA	Paulinho Curuá	11 May 1997 (aged 27)	16 (10)	1
19	FW	BRA	Ytalo	12 January 1988 (aged 36)	25 (11)	10
20	DF	BRA	Thalys	14 January 2000 (aged 24)	20 (2)	0
21	FW	BRA	Kelvin	1 June 1993 (aged 31)	12 (22)	0
22	FW	BRA	Jáderson	12 August 2000 (aged 24)	38 (4)	6
23	DF	BRA	Vidal	23 August 1996 (aged 28)	7 (8)	0
30	MF	BRA	Guty	26 June 2003 (aged 21)	0 (1)	0
31	MF	BRA	Adsson	24 May 2000 (aged 24)	3 (5)	0
32	GK	BRA	Léo Lang	5 August 1998 (aged 26)	1 (1)	0
35	DF	BRA	Hélder Santos	21 October 1988 (aged 35)	5 (1)	0
38	DF	BRA	Rafael Castro	26 September 1996 (aged 28)	15 (1)	0
40	DF	BRA	Ligger	18 May 1988 (aged 36)	29 (1)	2
47	FW	BRA	Guilherme Cachoeira	25 April 2002 (aged 22)	5 (3)	0
56	MF	BRA	Henrique	20 January 2002 (aged 22)	10 (6)	1
61	GK	BRA	Victor Lube	5 February 1994 (aged 30)	0	0
77	FW	BRA	Jonny Robert	18 May 1998 (aged 26)	0 (1)	0
88	GK	BRA	Marcelo Rangel	17 May 1988 (aged 36)	44	0
95	FW	BRA	Rodrigo Alves	10 September 1995 (aged 29)	4 (8)	1
97	MF	BRA	Marco Antônio	1 October 1997 (aged 27)	20 (12)	3
98	FW	BRA	Felipinho	19 August 2003 (aged 21)	9 (6)	3
Players left the club during the playing season
1	GK	BRA	Vinícius	9 November 1984 (aged 39)	0	0
5	MF	BRA	Daniel	13 May 1996 (aged 27)	3 (1)	0
8	MF	BRA	Renato Alves	3 December 1991 (aged 32)	5 (7)	0
10	MF	BRA	Camilo	9 March 1986 (aged 37)	7 (2)	3
17	DF	BRA	Nathan	14 May 1998 (aged 25)	12 (1)	1
27	FW	BRA	Echaporã	17 February 2000 (aged 24)	8 (7)	4
29	FW	BRA	Kanu	24 April 2003 (aged 21)	0 (6)	1
35	DF	BRA	Reniê	10 April 1989 (aged 34)	6 (2)	0
44	DF	BRA	Ícaro	5 August 1993 (aged 30)	11 (1)	1
95	MF	BRA	Sillas	5 May 1995 (aged 29)	9 (4)	4
99	FW	BRA	Matheus Lucas	8 August 1998 (aged 25)	1 (2)	0

=== Top scorers ===
As of 30 September 2024

Place	Position	Name	Campeonato Brasileiro Série C	Campeonato Paraense	Copa do Brasil	Copa Verde	Total
1	FW	Ytalo	5	4	0	1	10
2	FW	Jáderson	4	2	0	0	6
3	MF	Sillas	1	2	0	1	4
3	FW	Echaporã	0	3	0	1	4
5	FW	Pedro Vitor	3	0	0	0	3
5	FW	Ribamar	1	0	0	2	3
5	FW	Felipinho	1	1	0	1	3
5	MF	Giovanni Pavani	3	0	0	0	3
5	MF	Marco Antônio	1	2	0	0	3
5	MF	Camilo	0	3	0	0	3
11	FW	Ronald	1	1	0	0	2
11	DF	Raimar	2	0	0	0	2
11	DF	Bruno Bispo	1	0	0	1	2
11	DF	Ligger	1	1	0	0	2
15	FW	Rodrigo Alves	1	0	0	0	1
15	FW	Kanu	0	0	0	1	1
15	MF	Paulinho Curuá	1	0	0	0	1
15	MF	Henrique	0	1	0	0	1
15	DF	Diogo Batista	1	0	0	0	1
15	DF	Nathan	0	1	0	0	1
15	DF	Ícaro	0	1	0	0	1
Own goals			0	2	0	0	2

=== Disciplinary record ===
As of 6 October 2024

Position	Name	Campeonato Brasileiro Série C		Campeonato Paraense		Copa do Brasil		Copa Verde		Total	
Position	Name	Yellow card	Red card	Yellow card	Red card	Yellow card	Red card	Yellow card	Red card	Yellow card	Red card
MF	Paulinho Curuá	4	1	0	1	0	0	1	0	5	2
MF	Marco Antônio	0	1	1	1	0	0	2	0	3	2
MF	Giovanni Pavani	6	1	2	0	0	0	0	0	8	1
DF	Ligger	3	1	2	0	0	0	1	0	6	1
DF	Nathan	0	0	3	1	0	0	2	0	5	1
MF	João Afonso	5	1	0	0	0	0	0	0	5	1
FW	Jáderson	2	1	3	0	0	0	0	0	5	1
DF	Ícaro	1	0	2	1	0	0	1	0	4	1
FW	Echaporã	0	0	1	0	0	0	3	1	4	1
DF	Sheldon	0	1	0	0	0	0	0	0	0	1
FW	Pedro Vitor	8	0	1	0	0	0	0	0	9	0
DF	Bruno Bispo	5	0	1	0	0	0	0	0	6	0
DF	Raimar	5	0	0	0	0	0	1	0	6	0
MF	Bruno Silva	6	0	0	0	0	0	0	0	6	0
MF	Henrique	0	0	3	0	0	0	3	0	6	0
DF	Thalys	1	0	2	0	0	0	2	0	5	0
DF	Diogo Batista	4	0	0	0	0	0	0	0	4	0
FW	Ribamar	3	0	0	0	1	0	0	0	4	0
GK	Marcelo Rangel	3	0	0	0	0	0	1	0	4	0
DF	Hélder Santos	3	0	0	0	0	0	0	0	3	0
MF	Matheus Anjos	2	0	1	0	0	0	0	0	3	0
FW	Kelvin	2	0	1	0	0	0	0	0	3	0
DF	Vidal	1	0	1	0	0	0	0	0	2	0
MF	Adsson	2	0	0	0	0	0	0	0	2	0
MF	Renato Alves	0	0	2	0	0	0	0	0	2	0
FW	Ytalo	1	0	1	0	0	0	0	0	1	0
FW	Felipinho	1	0	1	0	0	0	0	0	2	0
FW	Kanu	0	0	2	0	0	0	0	0	2	0
DF	Rafael Castro	1	0	0	0	0	0	0	0	1	0
DF	Reniê	0	0	1	0	0	0	0	0	1	0
DF	Jonílson	0	0	1	0	0	0	0	0	1	0
MF	Daniel	0	0	1	0	0	0	0	0	1	0
FW	Rodrigo Alves	1	0	0	0	0	0	0	0	1	0
FW	Ronald	1	0	0	0	0	0	0	0	1	0
FW	Guilherme Cachoeira	1	0	0	0	0	0	0	0	1	0
GK	Léo Lang	1	0	0	0	0	0	0	0	1	0
	TOTALS	73	7	33	4	1	0	17	1	124	12

== Kit ==
Supplier: Volt Sport / Main sponsor: Banpará, Betnacional

Home	Home alt. 1	Away	Away alt. 1

== New contracts and transfers ==
=== Transfers in ===
Position	Name	From	Type	Source
FW	Pedro Vitor	(Brazil) Fortaleza	Loan	
FW	Ytalo	(Brazil) Red Bull Bragantino	Transfer	
MF	Daniel	(Brazil) ABC	Transfer	
MF	Renato Alves	(Brazil) Atlético Goianiense	Transfer	
DF	Vidal	(Brazil) Botafogo-SP	Transfer	
MF	Camilo	(Brazil) Mirassol	Transfer	
GK	Léo Lang	(Brazil) Tombense	Transfer	
DF	Ícaro	(Brazil) Sampaio Corrêa	Transfer	
DF	Reniê	(Brazil) Mirassol	Transfer	
MF	Giovanni Pavani	(Brazil) Linense	Transfer	
DF	Ligger	(Brazil) Novorizontino	Transfer	
DF	Raimar	(Portugal) Nacional	Transfer	
GK	Marcelo Rangel	(Brazil) Goiás	Transfer	
FW	Jáderson	(Brazil) Athletico Paranaense	Loan	
DF	Thalys	(Brazil) América Mineiro	Transfer	
DF	Nathan	(Brazil) Fortaleza	Transfer	
MF	Marco Antônio	(Brazil) Bahia	Loan	
FW	Echaporã	(Brazil) Atlético Mineiro	Loan	
DF	Bruno Bispo	(Iraq) Erbil	Transfer	
FW	Kelvin	(Japan) Ryukyu	Transfer	
FW	Ribamar	(Brazil) Náutico	Transfer	
MF	Matheus Anjos	(Brazil) ABC	Transfer	
MF	Sillas	(Brazil) Atlético Goianiense	Transfer	
MF	João Afonso	(Brazil) Novorizontino	Transfer	
FW	Guilherme Cachoeira	(Brazil) Fortaleza	Loan	
DF	Sheldon	(Brazil) Boavista	Loan	
DF	Hélder Santos	(Brazil) Guarani	Transfer	
FW	Matheus Lucas	(Brazil) Boavista	Transfer	
MF	Adsson	(Brazil) Bangu	Loan	
DF	Diogo Batista	(Brazil) Coritiba	Loan	
DF	Rafael Castro	(Brazil) Treze	Transfer	
GK	Victor Lube	(Brazil) Águia de Marabá	Transfer	
FW	Rodrigo Alves	(Brazil) FC Cascavel	Loan	
MF	Bruno Silva	(Brazil) Paraná	Transfer	
DF	Sávio	(Portugal) Rio Ave	Loan	
FW	Jonny Robert	(Brazil) Amazonas	Loan	

=== Transfers out ===
Position	Name	To	Type	Source
GK	Vinícius	Free agent	End of contract	
MF	Camilo	(Brazil) Figueirense	Contract terminated	
MF	Daniel	(Brazil) ABC	Contract terminated	
DF	Reniê	(Brazil) Botafogo-PB	Contract terminated	
DF	Ícaro	(Brazil) Floresta	Contract terminated	
DF	Nathan	(Brazil) Athletic	Contract terminated	
MF	Renato Alves	(Brazil) Náutico	Contract terminated	
MF	Sillas	(Brazil) Botafogo-PB	Contract terminated	
FW	Echaporã	(Brazil) Atlético Mineiro	Loan return	
FW	Matheus Lucas	(Brazil) Volta Redonda	Contract terminated	
FW	Kanu	(Portugal) Portimonense	Free transfer	

Notes

1. Following Camilo's release, he later signed for Figueirense.
2. Following Reniê's release, he later signed for Botafogo-PB.
3. Following Renato Alves' release, he later signed for Náutico.
4. Following Ícaro's release, he later signed for Floresta.
5. Following Nathan's release, he later signed for Athletic.
6. Following Sillas' release, he later signed for Botafogo-PB.

== Competitions ==
Competition	First match	Last match	Starting round	Final position	Record							
Competition	First match	Last match	Starting round	Final position	Pld	W	D	L	GF	GA	GD	Win %
Campeonato Brasileiro Série C	20 April 2024	5 October 2024	First stage	4th	25	10	5	10	27	30	−3	40.00
Campeonato Paraense	21 January 2024	14 April 2024	League phase	2nd	14	8	3	3	24	10	+14	57.14
Copa do Brasil	20 February 2024		First round	First round	1	0	0	1	0	1	−1	0.00
Copa Verde	7 March 2024	10 April 2024	Round of 16	Semi-finals	5	2	3	0	8	5	+3	40.00
Total					45	20	11	14	59	46	+13	44.44

Source: Competitions

=== Campeonato Brasileiro Série C ===
Win Draw Loss

==== First stage ====
Pos	Team	Pld	W	D	L	GF	GA	GD	Pts	Qualification or relegation
6	Ypiranga	19	9	4	6	22	18	+4	31	Advance to Second stage
7	Londrina	19	7	8	4	24	21	+3	29	Advance to Second stage
8	Remo	19	8	2	9	21	23	−2	26	Advance to Second stage
9	Náutico	19	6	7	6	34	25	+9	25	
10	CSA	19	6	7	6	22	26	−4	25	

Source: CBF
Rules for classification: 1) points; 2) wins; 3) goal difference; 4) goals scored; 5) fewest red cards; 6) fewest yellow cards; 7) draw.

===== Matches =====
20 April 2024 1	Remo	1–2	Volta Redonda	Belém
17:00 UTC−3	Pavani (yellow card) 65'; Jáderson 76'; Bruno Bispo (yellow card) 88'	Report	Bruno Barra (yellow card) 8'; MV 18'; Sánchez (yellow card) 64'; Karl (yellow card) 65'; Zé Vitor (yellow card) 69'; Ryan Guilherme (yellow card) 72'; Jean Drosny (yellow card) 75'; Pavani 87' (o.g.)	Stadium: Baenão; Attendance: 7,174; Referee: Artur de Morais Fernandes

27 April 2024 2	Athletic	3–1	Remo	São João del-Rei
19:30 UTC−3	Jonathas 16'; Edson (yellow card) 42'; David Braga 51'; Robinho 82'	Report	Kelvin (yellow card) 35'; Bruno Bispo (yellow card) 43'; Sillas 71'; Marco Antônio (red card) 86'	Stadium: Estádio Joaquim Portugal; Attendance: 2,487; Referee: Roger Goulart

5 May 2024 3	Botafogo-PB	1–0	Remo	João Pessoa
16:30 UTC−3	Dudu (yellow card) 10'; Pipico 28'; Dalton (yellow card) 83'	Report	Matheus Anjos (yellow card) 20'; Pavani (yellow card) 23'; Pedro Vitor (yellow card) 71'; Hélder Santos (yellow card) 85'; João Afonso (yellow card) 89'; Ícaro (yellow card) 90+4'	Stadium: Almeidão; Attendance: 2,330; Referee: Rafael Traci

12 May 2024 4	Remo	1–0	Floresta	Belém
19:00 UTC−3	Thalys (yellow card) 27'; Adsson (yellow card) 33'; Pavani (yellow card) 56'; Ytalo 88'; Ligger (yellow card) 90'	Report	Ricardo Lima (yellow card) 36'; Luiz Daniel (yellow card) 69'; Alisson (yellow card) 79'; Bruno Ré (yellow card) 81'; Andrew (yellow card) 83'	Stadium: Baenão; Attendance: 5,275; Referee: Antônio Dib Moraes de Sousa

19 May 2024 5	Remo	0–0	Tombense	Belém
16:30 UTC−3	Hélder Santos (yellow card) 27'; Pedro Vitor (yellow card) 51'; Jáderson (yellow card) 63' (yellow-red card) 83'; Bruno Bispo (yellow card) 90+2'	Report	Igor Bahia (yellow card) 37'	Stadium: Baenão; Attendance: 7,335; Referee: José Mendonça da Silva Júnior

25 May 2024 6	Náutico	4–1	Remo	Recife
17:00 UTC−3	Gustavo Maia 10'; Sousa (yellow card) 21'; Danilo Belão (yellow card) 25'; Paulo Sérgio 45+2', 53', (yellow card) 55'; Andrey (yellow card) 58'; Rafael Vaz 80'	Report	Sheldon (red card) 13'; Hélder Santos (yellow card) 31'; Marco Antônio 48'	Stadium: Estádio dos Aflitos; Attendance: 6,677; Referee: Fabiano Monteiro dos Santos

1 June 2024 7	Sampaio Corrêa	1–2	Remo	São Luís
17:00 UTC−3	Itambé (yellow card) 1'; João Felipe 57'	Report	Raimar 13'; Diogo Batista (yellow card) 37'; Jáderson 46'; Ribamar (yellow card) 69'; Adsson (yellow card) 72'; Marcelo Rangel (yellow card) 75'; Paulinho Curuá (yellow card) 78'; João Afonso (yellow card) 90+1'	Stadium: Castelão; Attendance: 1,802; Referee: Paulo Henrique Schleich Vollkopf

9 June 2024 8	Remo	0–1	São Bernardo	Belém
19:00 UTC−3	Ligger (red card) 61'; Pedro Vitor (yellow card) 69'; Raimar (yellow card) 83'	Report	João Ramos (yellow card) 25'; Alex Alves (yellow card) 36'; Luiz Filipe 47'; Lucas Tocantins (yellow card) 70'; Arthur Henrique (yellow card) 88'; João Diogo (yellow card) 90+3'	Stadium: Baenão; Attendance: 7,119; Referee: Luciano da Silva Miranda Filho

16 June 2024 9	Remo	1–0	Ypiranga	Belém
16:30 UTC−3	Ytalo 22'; Paulinho Curuá (yellow card) 67'; Ribamar (yellow card) 73'; Diogo Batista (yellow card) 85'	Report	Gedeílson (yellow card) 16'	Stadium: Baenão; Attendance: 4,186; Referee: Wagner Francisco Silva Souza

24 June 2024 10	ABC	3–1	Remo	Natal
20:00 UTC−3	Jenison 23', (yellow card) 23'; Lucas Sampaio 26', (yellow card) 52'; Matheus Blade (yellow card) 33'; Daniel (yellow card) 44'; Felipe Albuquerque (yellow card) 90'; Manoel (yellow card) 90+1'; Daniel Cruz 90+6'; Ruan (yellow card) 90+7'	Report	Pedro Vitor (yellow card) 31'; Felipinho (yellow card) 45+2', (goal) 76'; Pavani (yellow card) 67'; Matheus Anjos (yellow card) 90+1'	Stadium: Frasqueirão; Attendance: 3,011; Referee: Lucas Guimarães Rechatiko Horn

29 June 2024 11	Remo	2–1	Ferroviário	Belém
19:30 UTC−3	Jáderson 53'; Raimar (yellow card) 62'; Marcelo Rangel (yellow card) 65'; Pavani 68'; Rafael Castro (yellow card) 81'	Report	Ernandes (yellow card) 6'; Igor Dutra (yellow card) 17'; Geaze (yellow card) 45+5'; Kiuan 76'; Willian Rocha (red card) 90+2'	Stadium: Baenão; Attendance: 3,718; Referee: Antônio Dib Moraes de Sousa

8 July 2024 12	Caxias	2–4	Remo	Caxias do Sul
20:00 UTC−3	Gabriel Silva 49'; Mateus Mendes (yellow card) 75'; Álvaro 90+13'	Report	Bruno Bispo 7', (yellow card) 86'; Pavani 19'; Marcelo Rangel (yellow card) 33'; Raimar (yellow card) 38'; Léo Lang (yellow card) 82'; Jáderson 88'; Ronald 90+18'	Stadium: Estádio Centenário; Attendance: 1,600; Referee: Afro Rocha de Carvalho Filho

15 July 2024 13	Ferroviária	2–1	Remo	Mirassol
20:00 UTC−3	Igor Fernandes (yellow card) 66'; Xavier (yellow card) 70'; Lucas Rodrigues (yellow card) 77'; Carlão 79'; Fernandinho 81'; Victor Andrade (yellow card) 82'; Gustavo Medina (yellow card) 90+4'	Report	Pavani (yellow card) 25'; Paulinho Curuá 36'; Ronald (yellow card) 76'; João Afonso (yellow card) 90+3'	Stadium: Estádio José Maria de Campos Maia; Attendance: 220; Referee: Emerson Ricardo de Almeida Andrade

22 July 2024 14	Remo	2–1	CSA	Belém
20:00 UTC−3	Ligger 31'; Guilherme Cachoeira (yellow card) 48'; Ribamar 88'	Report	Matheus Santos (yellow card) 34' (yellow-red card) 41'; Tiago Marques 49'; Gustavo Nicola (yellow card) 68'	Stadium: Mangueirão; Attendance: 17,092; Referee: Júlio César Pfleger

27 July 2024 15	Figueirense	1–0	Remo	Florianópolis
17:00 UTC−3	Jefinho 20'; Guilherme Pato (yellow card) 33'; Gledson (yellow card) 47'; Léo Baiano (yellow card) 59'; Ruan Carneiro (yellow card) 73'	Report		Stadium: Estádio Orlando Scarpelli; Attendance: 7,152; Referee: Emerson Souza Silva

5 August 2024 16	Remo	1–0	Aparecidense	Belém
20:00 UTC−3	Bruno Silva (yellow card) 18'; Diogo Batista (yellow card) 24'; Pedro Vitor 54'; Ribamar (yellow card) 60'; Paulinho Curuá (yellow card) 90+1' (yellow-red card) 90+5'	Report	Vanderley (yellow card) 18'	Stadium: Mangueirão; Attendance: 18,697; Referee: Leonardo Willers Lorenzatto

10 August 2024 17	Confiança	1–0	Remo	Aracaju
17:00 UTC−3	André Lima (yellow card) 45+3', (goal) 70' (pen.); Júlio Rusch (yellow card) 83'	Report	Kelvin (yellow card) 48'; Bruno Silva (yellow card) 66'; Vidal (yellow card) 68'; Ytalo (yellow card) 90'; João Afonso (yellow card) 90+3'; Pedro Vitor (yellow card) 90+3'	Stadium: Batistão; Attendance: 2,575; Referee: Luiz Paulo de Moura Pinheiro

17 August 2024 18	Remo	3–0	Londrina	Belém
21:00 UTC−3	Ytalo 45+3'; Ligger (yellow card) 68'; Diogo Batista 73'; Rodrigo Alves 87'	Report	Everton Moraes (yellow card) 31'; Maurício (yellow card) 72'; João Maistro (yellow card) 85'	Stadium: Mangueirão; Attendance: 22,037; Referee: Sávio Sampaio

24 August 2024 19	São José	0–0	Remo	Porto Alegre
17:00 UTC−3	Fredson (yellow card) 18'	Report	Bruno Silva (yellow card) 59'; Ligger (yellow card) 59'; Rodrigo Alves (yellow card) 77'	Stadium: Estádio Passo D'Areia; Attendance: 336; Referee: Wagner do Nascimento Magalhães

==== Second stage ====
Pos	Team	Pld	W	D	L	GF	GA	GD	Pts	Qualification
1	Volta Redonda (P)	6	3	3	0	8	4	+4	12	Advance to Finals and promoted to 2025 Série B
2	Remo (P)	6	2	3	1	6	7	−1	9	Promoted to 2025 Série B
3	Botafogo-PB	6	1	2	3	5	5	0	5	
4	São Bernardo	6	1	2	3	5	8	−3	5	

Source: CBF
Rules for classification: 1) points; 2) wins; 3) goal difference; 4) goals scored; 5) head-to-head results (only between 2 teams); 6) fewest red cards; 7) fewest yellow cards; 8) draw.
(P) Promoted

===== Matches =====
31 August 2024 1	Remo	2–1	Botafogo-PB	Belém
17:30 UTC−3	Pedro Vitor 22', 40'; Raimar (yellow card) 82'	Report	Sillas 56' (pen.); Rafael Furlan (yellow card) 76'; Edmundo (yellow card) 81'	Stadium: Mangueirão; Attendance: 44,798; Referee: Lucas Casagrande

9 September 2024 2	São Bernardo	2–2	Remo	São Bernardo do Campo
20:00 UTC−3	Hélder (yellow card) 15', (goal) 58'; Júnior Oliveira (yellow card) 20'; Mika (yellow card) 69'; Augusto (yellow card) 75'; Kauã 84'; Jeferson (yellow card) 87'; Rodrigo Souza (yellow card) 89'	Report	Ytalo 42'; Raimar 47'; Bruno Silva (yellow card) 69'; Pedro Vitor (yellow card) 88'	Stadium: Estádio 1º de Maio; Attendance: 3,667; Referee: Paulo Roberto Alves Júnior

15 September 2024 3	Remo	0–0	Volta Redonda	Belém
18:30 UTC−3	Bruno Silva (yellow card) 36'; Raimar (yellow card) 52'; Bruno Bispo (yellow card) 57'; Pedro Vitor (yellow card) 65'; Pavani (yellow card) 90+1'; João Afonso (yellow card) 90+6'	Report	Lucas Souza (yellow card) 28'; Henrique Silva (yellow card) 39'; Bruno Barra (yellow card) 44'; Bruno Santos (yellow card) 58'; Marcos Júnior (yellow card) 77'; Wellington Silva (yellow card) 82'; Léo Rigo (yellow card) 87'	Stadium: Mangueirão; Attendance: 39,027; Referee: Emerson Ricardo de Almeida Andrade

21 September 2024 4	Volta Redonda	1–1	Remo	Volta Redonda
17:30 UTC−3	Lucas Souza (yellow card) 17'; Bruno Santos 45+4'; Juninho Nogueira (yellow card) 52'; Jean Drosny (yellow card) 66'; Fabrício (yellow card) 67'; Emerson Júnior (yellow card) 74'; Cristiano (yellow card) 90'	Report	Pedro Vitor (yellow card) 13'; Bruno Silva (yellow card) 50'; Diogo Batista (yellow card) 51'; Pavani 90+2' (pen.)	Stadium: Estádio Raulino de Oliveira; Attendance: 4,461; Referee: Dênis da Silva Ribeiro Serafim

29 September 2024 5	Remo	1–0	São Bernardo	Belém
16:30 UTC−3	Ytalo 45+2'	Report	Davi Gabriel (yellow card) 34'	Stadium: Mangueirão; Attendance: 54,864; Referee: Anderson Daronco

5 October 2024 6	Botafogo-PB	3–0	Remo	João Pessoa
17:30 UTC−3	Dudu (yellow card) 45+5', (goal) 65'; Joãozinho 54'; Wendel Lomar (yellow card) 60'; Reniê (yellow card) 70'; Henrique Dourado 77' (pen.)	Report	João Afonso (red card) 40'; Pavani (red card) 90+7'	Stadium: Almeidão; Attendance: 446; Referee: Rodrigo da Fonseca Silva

=== Campeonato Paraense ===
Win Draw Loss

==== Group stage ====
Pos	Team	Pld	W	D	L	GF	GA	GD	Pts	Qualification or relegation
1	Paysandu (A)	8	6	2	0	12	2	+10	20	Advance to the Final stage
2	Tuna Luso (A)	8	4	4	0	17	8	+9	16	Advance to the Final stage
3	Remo (A)	8	4	2	2	14	6	+8	14	Advance to the Final stage
4	Caeté (A)	8	3	3	2	10	9	+1	12	Advance to the Final stage
5	Águia de Marabá (A)	8	3	3	2	5	7	−2	12	Advance to the Final stage

Updated to match(es) played on 4 March 2024. Source: Globo Esporte
(A) Advance to a further round

===== Matches =====
21 January 2024 1	Remo	5–0	Canaã	Belém
16:00 UTC−3	Pietro 8' (o.g.); Echaporã 21'; Ytalo 42'; Camilo 45'; Kanu (yellow card) 77'; Henrique (yellow card) 80'; Marco Antônio 90'	Report	Batista (yellow card) 75'; Mimica (yellow card) 88'	Stadium: Mangueirão; Attendance: 27,076; Referee: Olivaldo José Alves Moraes

24 January 2024 2	Castanhal	0–1	Remo	Belém
20:30 UTC−3	Paulinho (yellow card) 58'; Régis (yellow card) 60'; Rodrigo (yellow card) 90'	Report	Reniê (yellow card) 34'; Thalys (yellow card) 36'; Echaporã 45+1'; Renato Alves (yellow card) 87'	Stadium: Mangueirão; Attendance: 8,135; Referee: Djonaltan Costa de Araújo

4 February 2024 3	Paysandu	0–0	Remo	Belém
17:00 UTC−3	Edílson (yellow card) 63'	Report	Ytalo (yellow card) 35'; Daniel (yellow card) 47'	Stadium: Mangueirão; Attendance: 48,180; Referee: Olivaldo José Alves Moraes

8 February 2024 4	Remo	2–3	Tuna Luso	Belém
20:00 UTC−3	Marlon 16' (o.g.); Jáderson 34'; Ligger (yellow card) 38'; Ícaro (yellow card) 78'	Report	Dedé 13'; Jonathan Chula (yellow card) 17', (goal) 24'; Luquinha (yellow card) 42'; Marlon (yellow card) 58'; Jayme (yellow card) 61'; Gabriel Furtado 89', (yellow card) 89'	Stadium: Baenão; Attendance: 8,690; Referee: Fernando Antônio Mendes de Salles Nascimento Filho

14 February 2024 5	Tapajós	1–3	Remo	Belém
20:00 UTC−3	Elizeu (yellow card) 14', (goal) 20'; Jhonata (yellow card) 71'	Report	Felipinho (yellow card) 24'; Ytalo 26'; Camilo 37'; Henrique (yellow card) 54'; Marco Antônio 55'; Nathan (yellow card) 61'; Pavani (yellow card) 76'; Ligger (yellow card) 86'	Stadium: Baenão; Attendance: 5,186; Referee: Alexandre Expedito Vieira da Silva Júnior
Note: The match, originally scheduled for 28 January 2024, was postponed due to the poor condition of the pitch at the Estádio Arena do Município Verde, in Paragominas.

25 February 2024 6	Remo	2–0	Águia de Marabá	Belém
17:00 UTC−3	Camilo 46'; Henrique 60'	Report	Betão (yellow card) 51'	Stadium: Baenão; Attendance: 4,028; Referee: Marco José Soares de Almeida

28 February 2024 7	Remo	1–1	São Francisco	Belém
20:00 UTC−3	Ícaro 41', (yellow card) 45+1'; Thalys (yellow card) 76'	Report	Edgo 28'; Ramonzinho (yellow card) 32'; Erik (yellow card) 59'; Bruno Costa (yellow card) 77'	Stadium: Baenão; Attendance: 5,060; Referee: André Michel Petri Galina

3 March 2024 8	Bragantino	1–0	Remo	Bragança
15:30 UTC−3	Raçudo (yellow card) 14'; Edicleber 61'; André (yellow card) 74'; Guly (yellow card) 90+7'	Report	Bruno Bispo (yellow card) 11'; Vidal (yellow card) 35'; Jáderson (yellow card) 56'	Stadium: Diogão; Attendance: 3,458; Referee: Alexandre Expedito Vieira da Silva Júnior

==== Final stage ====
===== Quarter-finals =====
10 March 2024 First leg	Santa Rosa	0–3	Remo	Belém
16:30 UTC−3		Report	Echaporã 27', (yellow card) 45+3'; Henrique (yellow card) 30'; Felipinho 33'; Ligger 51'	Stadium: Baenão; Attendance: 5,676; Referee: Djonaltan Costa de Araújo

16 March 2024 Second leg	Remo	2–0 (5–0 agg.)	Santa Rosa	Belém
17:00 UTC−3	Sillas 7'; Nathan 70'	Report	Cristian Moura (yellow card) 15'; Alysson (yellow card) 17'; Rogério (yellow card) 42'	Stadium: Baenão; Attendance: 6,529; Referee: Olivaldo José Alves Moraes

===== Semi-finals =====
28 March 2024 First leg	Tuna Luso	1–2	Remo	Belém
20:00 UTC−3	Jayme 16', (yellow card) 45'; Wander (yellow card) 44'; Marlon (yellow card) 52'; Germano (yellow card) 74'	Report	Jáderson (yellow card) 20'; Ytalo 51'; Kelvin (yellow card) 64'; Sillas 77' (pen.); Jonílson (yellow card) 90'	Stadium: Mangueirão; Attendance: 11,233; Referee: Djonaltan Costa de Araújo

31 March 2024 Second leg	Remo	2–0 (4–1 agg.)	Tuna Luso	Belém
17:00 UTC−3	Pavani (yellow card) 15'; Marco Antônio (yellow card) 34', (red card) 85'; Ytalo 79'; Pedro Vitor (yellow card) 85'; Jáderson 90+3'	Report	Renan Metz (yellow card) 20'; Jayme (yellow card) 39'; Gabriel Furtado (yellow card) 43'; Wesley (yellow card) 47'; Marlon (yellow card) 48'; Pedrinho (yellow card) 77'; Tiago Bagagem (red card) 85'	Stadium: Mangueirão; Attendance: 13,122; Referee: Olivaldo José Alves Moraes

===== Finals =====
7 April 2024 First leg	Remo	0–2	Paysandu	Belém
17:00 UTC−3	Nathan (yellow card) 8' (yellow-red card) 53'; Renato Alves (yellow card) 34'; Matheus Anjos (yellow card) 87'; Paulinho Curuá (red card) 90'	Report	João Vieira (yellow card) 16'; Jean Dias 18'; Robinho (yellow card) 45'; Biel (yellow card) 89'; García 90+2'; Leandro Vilela (red card) 90+9'	Stadium: Mangueirão; Attendance: 28,359; Referee: Bráulio da Silva Machado

14 April 2024 Second leg	Paysandu	1–1 (3–1 agg.)	Remo	Belém
17:00 UTC−3	João Vieira (yellow card) 15'; Nicolas 57' (pen.), (yellow card) 69'; Netinho (yellow card) 66'; Jean Dias (yellow card) 70'	Report	Ícaro (red card) 54'; Ronald 63'; Kanu (yellow card) 83'; Jáderson (yellow card) 86'	Stadium: Mangueirão; Attendance: 32,907; Referee: Paulo César Zanovelli da Silva

=== Copa do Brasil ===
Win Draw Loss

==== First round ====
20 February 2024	Porto Velho	1–0	Remo	Porto Velho
16:30 UTC−3	Andreo (yellow card) 2'; Fagner 8'; Caio (yellow card) 19'; Digão (yellow card) 47'; Marco Goiano (yellow card) 90+3'; Emerson Bacas (yellow card) 90+7'	Report	Ribamar (yellow card) 1'	Stadium: Aluizão; Attendance: 2,294; Referee: Maguielson Lima Barbosa

=== Copa Verde ===
Win Draw Loss

==== Round of 16 ====
7 March 2024	Remo	3–1	Trem	Belém
20:00 UTC−3	Felipinho 6'; Marco Antônio (yellow card) 18'; Henrique (yellow card) 35'; Raimar (yellow card) 53'; Ribamar 57'; Echaporã (yellow card) 73'; Thalys (yellow card) 80'; Kanu 90+4'	Report	Foguete (yellow card) 11'; Caíque (yellow card) 47'; Daniel Felipe 56' (pen.), (yellow card) 82'; Aleílson (yellow card) 56'	Stadium: Baenão; Attendance: 6,037; Referee: Jonathan Antero Silva

==== Quarter-finals ====
20 March 2024 First leg	Remo	2–1	Amazonas	Belém
20:00 UTC−3	Echaporã 26', (yellow card) 28' (yellow-red card) 48'; Ribamar 41'; Marcelo Rangel (yellow card) 45+5'; Henrique (yellow card) 50'; Nathan (yellow card) 59'	Report	Diego Torres 14'; Edson Mardden (yellow card) 34'; Jô (yellow card) 62'; Alvariño (yellow card) 90+2'	Stadium: Baenão; Attendance: 9,218; Referee: Sávio Sampaio

23 March 2024 Second leg	Amazonas	2–2 (3–4 agg.)	Remo	Manaus
18:00 UTC−3	William Barbio 4', 35'; Guilherme Mantuan (yellow card) 43'; Edson Mardden (yellow card) 51'; Rafael Tavares (yellow card) 54'; Diego Torres (yellow card) 67'; Jiménez (yellow card) 83'	Report	Nathan (yellow card) 49'; Ytalo 55'; Ligger (yellow card) 73'; Sillas 90'	Stadium: Arena da Amazônia; Attendance: 2,920; Referee: Maguielson Lima Barbosa

==== Semi-finals ====
3 April 2024 First leg	Paysandu	0–0	Remo	Belém
20:00 UTC−3	Gabriel Bispo (yellow card) 37'; Lucas Maia (yellow card) 43'; Robinho (yellow card) 48'; Edílson (yellow card) 58'; Val Soares (yellow card) 80'	Report	Thalys (yellow card) 86'	Stadium: Mangueirão; Attendance: 32,333; Referee: Jefferson Ferreira de Moraes

10 April 2024 Second leg	Remo	1–1 (1–1 agg.) (3–4 p)	Paysandu	Belém
20:00 UTC−3	Marco Antônio (yellow card) 25'; Bruno Bispo 35'; Paulinho Curuá (yellow card) 61'; Ícaro (yellow card) 71'; Henrique (yellow card) 90+3'	Report	Leandro Vilela (yellow card) 6'; João Vieira (yellow card) 9'; Robinho (yellow card) 19'; Bryan 33', (yellow card) 44'; Edinho (yellow card) 62'; Wanderson (yellow card) 63', (red card) 83'; Matheus Nogueira (yellow card) 90'; Biel (red card) 90+2'	Stadium: Mangueirão; Attendance: 27,884; Referee: Arthur Gomes Rabelo
	Penalties
	Pavani (penalty scored); Sillas (penalty missed); Ícaro (penalty scored); Felipinho (penalty scored); Jáderson (penalty missed)		(penalty missed) Nicolas; (penalty scored) João Vieira; (penalty scored) Ruan Ribeiro; (penalty scored) Jean Dias; (penalty scored) Val Soares
