= 2024 Campeonato Paraense finals =

- Event: 2024 Campeonato Paraense
| Remo | Paysandu |
| 1 | 3 |
- on aggregate

First leg
| Remo | Paysandu |
| 0 | 2 |
- Date: 7 April 2024
- Venue: Mangueirão, Belém
- Referee: Bráulio da Silva Machado
- Attendance: 28,359

Second leg
| Paysandu | Remo |
| 1 | 1 |
- Date: 14 April 2024
- Venue: Mangueirão, Belém
- Referee: Paulo César Zanovelli da Silva
- Attendance: 32,907

The 2024 Campeonato Paraense finals was the final that decided the 2024 Campeonato Paraense, the 112th season of the Campeonato Paraense. The final were contested between Remo and Paysandu.

Paysandu defeated Remo 3–1 on aggregate to win their 50th Campeonato Paraense title.

== Road to the final ==
Note: In all scores below, the score of the finalist is given first.

| Remo | | | Round | Paysandu | | |
|---|---|---|---|---|---|---|
| Opponent | Venue | Score | | Opponent | Venue | Score |
| | | | Group stage | | | |
| Pos / Team / Pld / Pts; 1 / Paysandu (A) / 8 / 20; 2 / Tuna Luso (A) / 8 / 16; 3 / Remo (A) / 8 / 14; 4 / Caeté (A) / 8 / 12; 5 / Águia de Marabá (A) / 8 / 12; Updated to match(es) played on 4 March 2024. Source: Globo Esporte (A) Advance to a further round | | | Group stage | Pos / Team / Pld / Pts; 1 / Paysandu (A) / 8 / 20; 2 / Tuna Luso (A) / 8 / 16; 3 / Remo (A) / 8 / 14; 4 / Caeté (A) / 8 / 12; 5 / Águia de Marabá (A) / 8 / 12; Updated to match(es) played on 4 March 2024. Source: Globo Esporte (A) Advance to a further round | | |
| Santa Rosa (won 5–0 on aggregate) | Away | 3–0 | Quarter-finals | Bragantino (won 6–1 on aggregate) | Away | 3–0 |
| Santa Rosa (won 5–0 on aggregate) | Home | 2–0 | Quarter-finals | Bragantino (won 6–1 on aggregate) | Home | 3–1 |
| Tuna Luso (won 4–1 on aggregate) | Away | 2–1 | Semi-finals | Águia de Marabá (won 5–1 on aggregate) | Away | 1–1 |
| Tuna Luso (won 4–1 on aggregate) | Home | 2–0 | Semi-finals | Águia de Marabá (won 5–1 on aggregate) | Home | 4–0 |

== Format ==
The finals were played on a home-and-away two-legged basis. If tied on aggregate, the penalty shoot-out was used to determine the winner.

== Matches ==
=== First leg ===
7 April 2024
17:00 UTC−3

| Remo | 0–2 | Paysandu |
|---|---|---|
| | Report | Jean Dias 18'; García 90+2' |

Mangueirão, Belém
Attendance: 28,359
Referee: Bráulio da Silva Machado (Santa Catarina)

| Remo | Paysandu |

| GK | 88 | (Brazil) Marcelo Rangel (c) |
| DF | 20 | (Brazil) Thalys |
| DF | 4 | (Brazil) Bruno Bispo |
| DF | 44 | (Brazil) Ícaro |
| DF | 17 | (Brazil) Nathan | (yellow card) 8' (yellow-red card) 53' |
| MF | 16 | (Brazil) Paulinho Curuá | (red card) 90' |
| MF | 8 | (Brazil) Renato Alves | (yellow card) 34' | (substituted off) 46' |
| MF | 7 | (Brazil) Giovanni Pavani | | (substituted off) 84' |
| MF | 95 | (Brazil) Sillas | | (substituted off) 59' |
| FW | 27 | (Brazil) Echaporã | | (substituted off) 46' |
| FW | 19 | (Brazil) Ytalo | | (substituted off) 59' |
Substitutes:
| GK | 32 | (Brazil) Léo Lang |
| DF | 12 | (Brazil) Raimar | | (substituted in) 59' |
| DF | 14 | (Brazil) Jonílson |
| DF | 23 | (Brazil) Vidal |
| MF | 10 | (Brazil) Matheus Anjos | (yellow card) 87' | (substituted in) 46' |
| MF | 56 | (Brazil) Henrique | | (substituted in) 84' |
| FW | 9 | (Brazil) Ribamar | | (substituted in) 59' |
| FW | 11 | (Brazil) Pedro Vitor |
| FW | 15 | (Brazil) Ronald |
| FW | 21 | (Brazil) Kelvin | | (substituted in) 46' |
| FW | 29 | (Brazil) Kanu |
| FW | 98 | (Brazil) Felipinho |
Coach:
(Paraguay) Gustavo Morínigo

| GK | 13 | (Brazil) Matheus Nogueira |
| DF | 2 | (Brazil) Edílson |
| DF | 4 | (Brazil) Wanderson |
| DF | 27 | (Brazil) Lucas Maia |
| DF | 21 | (Brazil) Bryan |
| MF | 8 | (Brazil) João Vieira | (yellow card) 16' | (substituted off) 55' |
| MF | 28 | (Brazil) Leandro Vilela | (red card) 90+9' |
| MF | 8 | (Brazil) Robinho (c) | (yellow card) 45' | (substituted off) 64' |
| FW | 18 | (Brazil) Edinho | | (substituted off) 76' |
| FW | 22 | (Brazil) Jean Dias | | (substituted off) 76' |
| FW | 11 | (Brazil) Nicolas |
Substitutes:
| GK | 12 | (Brazil) Diogo Silva |
| DF | 16 | (Brazil) Michel Macedo |
| DF | 23 | (Brazil) Carlão |
| DF | 36 | (Brazil) Kevyn |
| MF | 6 | (Brazil) Gabriel Bispo |
| MF | 14 | (Brazil) Juninho |
| MF | 17 | (Brazil) Biel | (yellow card) 89' | (substituted in) 64' |
| MF | 30 | (Brazil) Val Soares | | (substituted in) 55' |
| FW | 10 | (Brazil) Vinícius Leite |
| FW | 15 | (Venezuela) Esli García | | (substituted in) 76' |
| FW | 26 | (Brazil) Ruan Ribeiro | | (substituted in) 76' |
| FW | 37 | (Brazil) Roger |
Coach:
(Brazil) Hélio dos Anjos

Assistant referees:
Eduardo Gonçalves da Cruz (Mato Grosso do Sul)
Alex dos Santos (Santa Catarina)
Fourth official:
Alexandre Expedito Vieira da Silva Júnior (Pará)
Fifth official:
Nayara Lucena Soares (Pará)
Video assistant referee:
Djonaltan Costa de Araújo (Pará)
Assistant video assistant referees:
Luís Diego Nascimento Lopes (Pará)
Gleika Oliveira Pinheiro (Pará)

=== Second leg ===
14 April 2024
17:00 UTC−3

| Paysandu | 1–1 | Remo |
|---|---|---|
| Nicolas 57' (pen.) | Report | Ronald 63' |

Mangueirão, Belém
Attendance: 32,907
Referee: Paulo César Zanovelli da Silva (Minas Gerais)

| Paysandu | Remo |

| GK | 13 | (Brazil) Matheus Nogueira |
| DF | 2 | (Brazil) Edílson |
| DF | 4 | (Brazil) Wanderson |
| DF | 23 | (Brazil) Carlão |
| DF | 21 | (Brazil) Bryan | | (substituted off) 76' |
| MF | 8 | (Brazil) João Vieira | (yellow card) 15' | (substituted off) 62' |
| MF | 30 | (Brazil) Val Soares |
| MF | 8 | (Brazil) Robinho (c) | | (substituted off) 62' |
| FW | 18 | (Brazil) Edinho | | (substituted off) 76' |
| FW | 22 | (Brazil) Jean Dias | (yellow card) 70' | (substituted off) 70' |
| FW | 11 | (Brazil) Nicolas | (yellow card) 69' |
Substitutes:
| GK | 12 | (Brazil) Diogo Silva |
| DF | 16 | (Brazil) Michel Macedo |
| DF | 31 | (Brazil) Naylhor |
| DF | 35 | (Brazil) Luan Freitas |
| DF | 36 | (Brazil) Kevyn | | (substituted in) 76' |
| MF | 5 | (Brazil) Netinho | (yellow card) 66' | (substituted in) 62' |
| MF | 6 | (Brazil) Gabriel Bispo | | (substituted in) 62' |
| MF | 14 | (Brazil) Juninho |
| FW | 10 | (Brazil) Vinícius Leite | | (substituted in) 76' |
| FW | 15 | (Venezuela) Esli García |
| FW | 26 | (Brazil) Ruan Ribeiro | | (substituted in) 70' |
| FW | 37 | (Brazil) Roger |
Coach:
(Brazil) Hélio dos Anjos

| GK | 88 | (Brazil) Marcelo Rangel |
| DF | 20 | (Brazil) Thalys |
| DF | 4 | (Brazil) Bruno Bispo | | (substituted off) 79' |
| DF | 44 | (Brazil) Ícaro | (red card) 54' |
| DF | 12 | (Brazil) Raimar | | (substituted off) 79' |
| MF | 22 | (Brazil) Jáderson | (yellow card) 86' |
| MF | 7 | (Brazil) Giovanni Pavani (c) |
| MF | 95 | (Brazil) Sillas | | (substituted off) 79' |
| FW | 21 | (Brazil) Kelvin | | (substituted off) 56' |
| FW | 15 | (Brazil) Ronald |
| FW | 9 | (Brazil) Ribamar | | (substituted off) 36' |
Substitutes:
| GK | 32 | (Brazil) Léo Lang |
| DF | 14 | (Brazil) Jonílson | | (substituted in) 56' |
| DF | 23 | (Brazil) Vidal |
| DF | 40 | (Brazil) Ligger | | (substituted in) 79' |
| MF | 8 | (Brazil) Renato Alves |
| MF | 10 | (Brazil) Matheus Anjos |
| MF | 56 | (Brazil) Henrique |
| MF | 97 | (Brazil) Marco Antônio | | (substituted in) 79' |
| FW | 11 | (Brazil) Pedro Vitor |
| FW | 19 | (Brazil) Ytalo | | (substituted in) 36' |
| FW | 29 | (Brazil) Kanu | (yellow card) 83' | (substituted in) 79' |
| FW | 98 | (Brazil) Felipinho |
Coach:
(Paraguay) Gustavo Morínigo

Assistant referees:
Danilo Ricardo Simon Manis (São Paulo)
Guilherme Dias Camilo (Minas Gerais)
Fourth official:
Murilo Augusto Amoras de Almeida (Pará)
Fifth official:
Carlos Eduardo Galeno Benevides (Pará)
Video assistant referee:
Marco Aurélio Augusto Fazekas Ferreira (Minas Gerais)
Assistant video assistant referees:
Marcus Vinícius Gomes (Minas Gerais)
José Mendonça da Silva Júnior (Paraná)
