= Roberta Murgo =

Brazilian model

Roberta Thaise
- Born: Roberta T. Murgo; May 8, 1987 (age 39); Echaporã, Brazil
- Modeling information
- Height: 1.63 m (5 ft 4 in)
- Hair color: Light brown
- Eye color: Brown

Roberta Murgo Thaise (born May 8, 1987), is a Brazilian model, who has posed for numerous publications including Maxim and the magazine Beauty is Divine. In October 2006 she appeared on the cover of the German magazine Matador.

== Early life ==
Murgo was born in Echaporã, Brazil on May 8, 1987, to parents Robert and Elizabeth. At age 18, Murgo quit school to pursue a modeling and acting career and moved alone to São Paulo.

== Career ==
=== Modeling ===
After the move to São Paulo, Murgo signed with the modeling firm Agency One. She soon found work doing various advertisements including posing for many companies and occasional bikini modeling. However, she never competed in any catwalk competitions, believing she was too short.

A month and a half after arriving in São Paulo, while living with 10 other models in an apartment, Murgo met photographer George Bishop. Bishop was working for the major media outlet Grupo Abril and helped Murgo set up a meeting with Playboy. In August 2005 she made her Playboy debut, appearing in the 30th Year Commemorative Edition of Brazilian Playboy, with Grazielli Massafera as the cover model. That same year, Murgo was invited back to make a second appearance in Maxim, this time in the December issue.

In 2006, Murgo traveled to Florianópolis to shoot for the online magazine Beauty is Divine, with photographers Brigham Field and José Luis Escobedo. The photographs would be used in the October 2006 edition of the German magazine Matador, with Murgo appearing on the cover.

In November 2010, she worked as Kristen Stewart's stand-in while filming honeymoon scenes for Breaking Dawn.

== Personal life ==
In 2006, Murgo was in a brief relationship with Mexican musician Alfonso "Poncho" Herrera of the band RBD. Murgo later stated, "It was a flirt, nothing more. The media exaggerated our relationship and the fans began to harass me, I was very upset. Alfonso and I had a little flirt while he passed through São Paulo, nothing else. The only problem was that somebody decided to tell the story in an incorrect way, saying it would serve to boost my career."

To escape the harassment, Murgo moved to Rome with her friend Mauricio Negrao, a millionaire and owner of a major radio station in Brazil, Antena 1. She started a relationship with him months later and stayed there for almost two years before returning to Brazil. As of 2010, she is studying architecture and urbanism at Unicentro Izabela Hendrix.
