= Echaporã =

Municipality in the state of São Paulo in Brazil

- Municipality
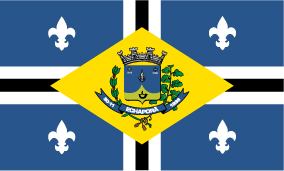
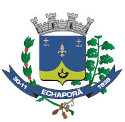
- Flag Coat of arms

- Location in São Paulo state

- Location in Brazil
- Coordinates: 22°25′46″S 50°12′2″W
- Country: Brazil
- Region: Southeast
- State: São Paulo

Area
  - Total: 516 km^{2} (199 sq mi)

Population (2020)
  - Total: 6,064
  - Density: 11.8/km^{2} (30.4/sq mi)
- Time zone: UTC−3 (BRT)

Echaporã is a municipality in the state of São Paulo in Brazil. The population is 6,064 (2020 est.) in an area of 516 km^{2} (199 sq mi). The elevation is 700 m.

== History ==
The municipality was created by state law in 1938.

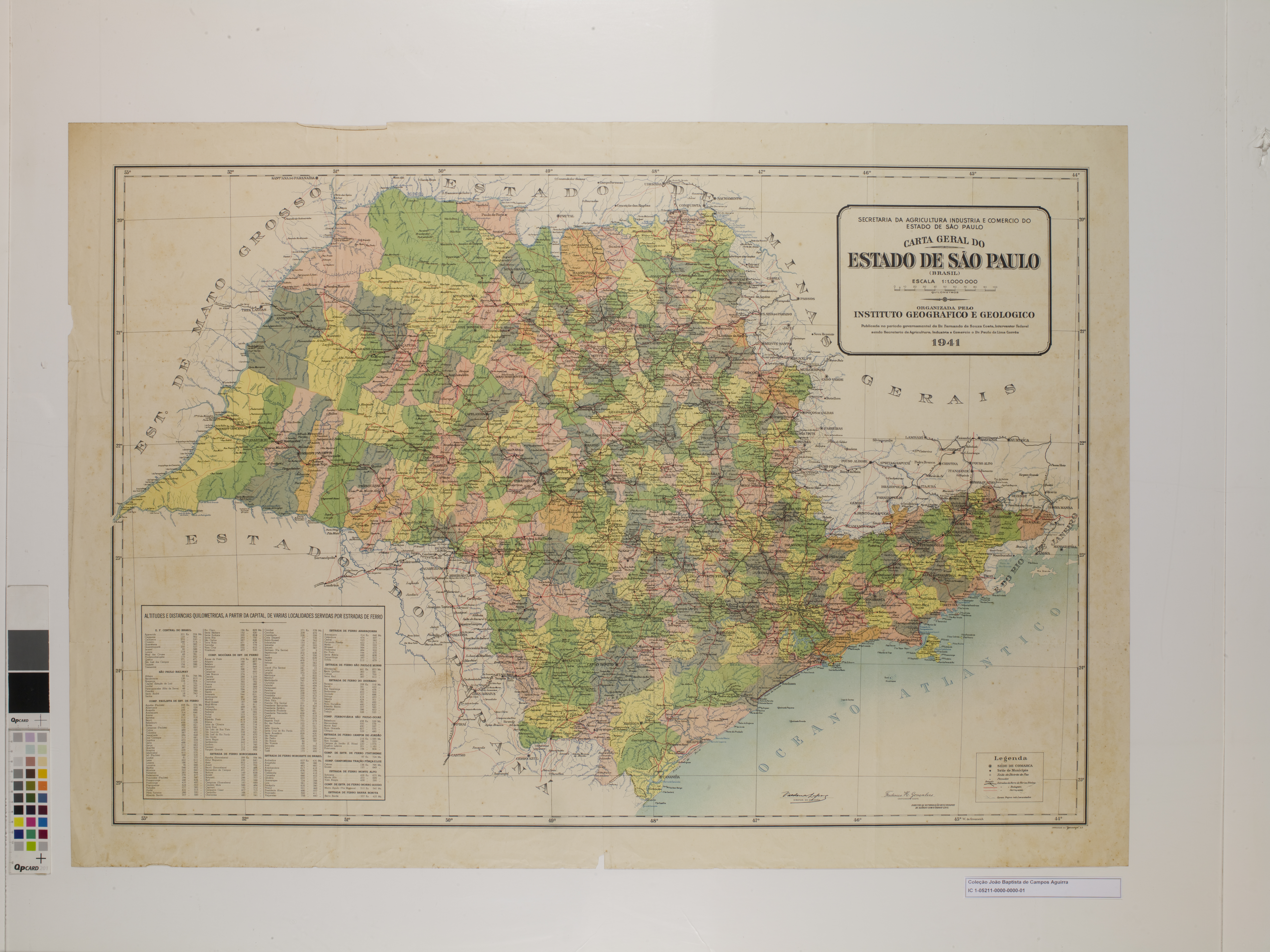
Map of the state of São Paulo (1938).

== Media ==
In telecommunications, the city was served by Companhia de Telecomunicações do Estado de São Paulo until 1973, when it began to be served by Telecomunicações de São Paulo. In July 1998, this company was acquired by Telefónica, which adopted the Vivo brand in 2012.

The company is currently an operator of cell phones, fixed lines, internet (fiber optics/4G) and television (satellite and cable).

== Religion ==
Christianity is present in the city as follows:

=== Catholic Church ===
The Catholic church in the municipality is part of the Roman Catholic Diocese of Assis.

=== Protestant Church ===
The most diverse evangelical beliefs are present in the city, mainly Pentecostal, including the Assemblies of God in Brazil (the largest evangelical church in the country), Christian Congregation in Brazil, among others. These denominations are growing more and more throughout Brazil.

== Notable people ==
- Roberta Murgo (born 1987), Brazilian model

== See also ==
- List of municipalities in São Paulo
