= Igor Dutra =

Brazilian footballer

Personal information
- Full name: Igor da Silva Dutra
- Date of birth: 17 March 2001 (age 25)
- Place of birth: São Paulo, Brazil
- Height: 1.86 m (6 ft 1 in)
- Position: Right-back

Team information
- Current team: São José-SP
- Number: 2

Youth career
- 2016: Audax
- 2016: Paulista
- 2017–2019: Juventus-SP
- 2019–2021: Avaí

Senior career*
Years	Team	Apps	(Gls)
2021–2023	Avaí	12	(0)
2024	CSA	3	(0)
2024	Ferroviário	14	(0)
2025	São Joseense	12	(0)
2025	Floresta	11	(0)
2026–	São José-SP	4	(0)
- * Club domestic league appearances and goals as of 20:44, 17 November 2026 (UTC)

Igor da Silva Dutra (born 17 March 2001), known as Igor Dutra or just Igor, is a Brazilian footballer who plays as a right-back for São José-SP.

== Career ==
Born in São Paulo, Igor finished his formation with Avaí, and was promoted to the first team in February 2021. He struggled with injuries in his first year, and only made his senior debut on 19 February 2022, coming on as a second-half substitute for Matheus Ribeiro in a 2–1 Campeonato Catarinense home win over Concórdia.

After failing to establish himself as a starter, Igor moved to CSA on 29 November 2023. After just three matches, he agreed to a deal with Ferroviário the following 14 February.

Igor began the 2025 season at São Joseense, but was announced at Floresta on 19 April of that year. On 13 November, São José-SP announced his signing for the ensuing campaign.

== Career statistics ==
As of 17 November 2026

Club	Season	League			State League		Cup		Continental		Other		Total	
Club	Season	Division	Apps	Goals	Apps	Goals	Apps	Goals	Apps	Goals	Apps	Goals	Apps	Goals
Avaí	2022	Série A	0	0	1	0	0	0	—		1 (Note: Appearance(s) in Copa Santa Catarina)	0	2	0
Avaí	2023	Série B	4	0	7	0	0	0	—		7	0	18	0
Avaí	Total		4	0	8	0	0	0	—		8	0	20	0
CSA	2024	Série C	—		3	0	—		—		1 (Note: Appearance(s) in Copa Alagoas)	0	4	0
Ferroviário	2024	Série C	14	0	—		—		—		—		14	0
São Joseense	2025	Paranaense	—		12	0	—		—		—		12	0
Floresta	2025	Série C	11	0	—		—		—		—		11	0
São José-SP	2026	Paulista A2	—		4	0	—		—		3 (Note: Appearance(s) in Copa Paulista)	0	7	0
Career total			29	0	27	0	0	0	0	0	12	0	68	0

== Honours ==
Avaí

- Copa Santa Catarina: 2022

CSA

- Copa Alagoas: 2024

São José-SP

- Copa Paulista: 2026
