= Bruno Silva (footballer, born 1986) =

Brazilian footballer

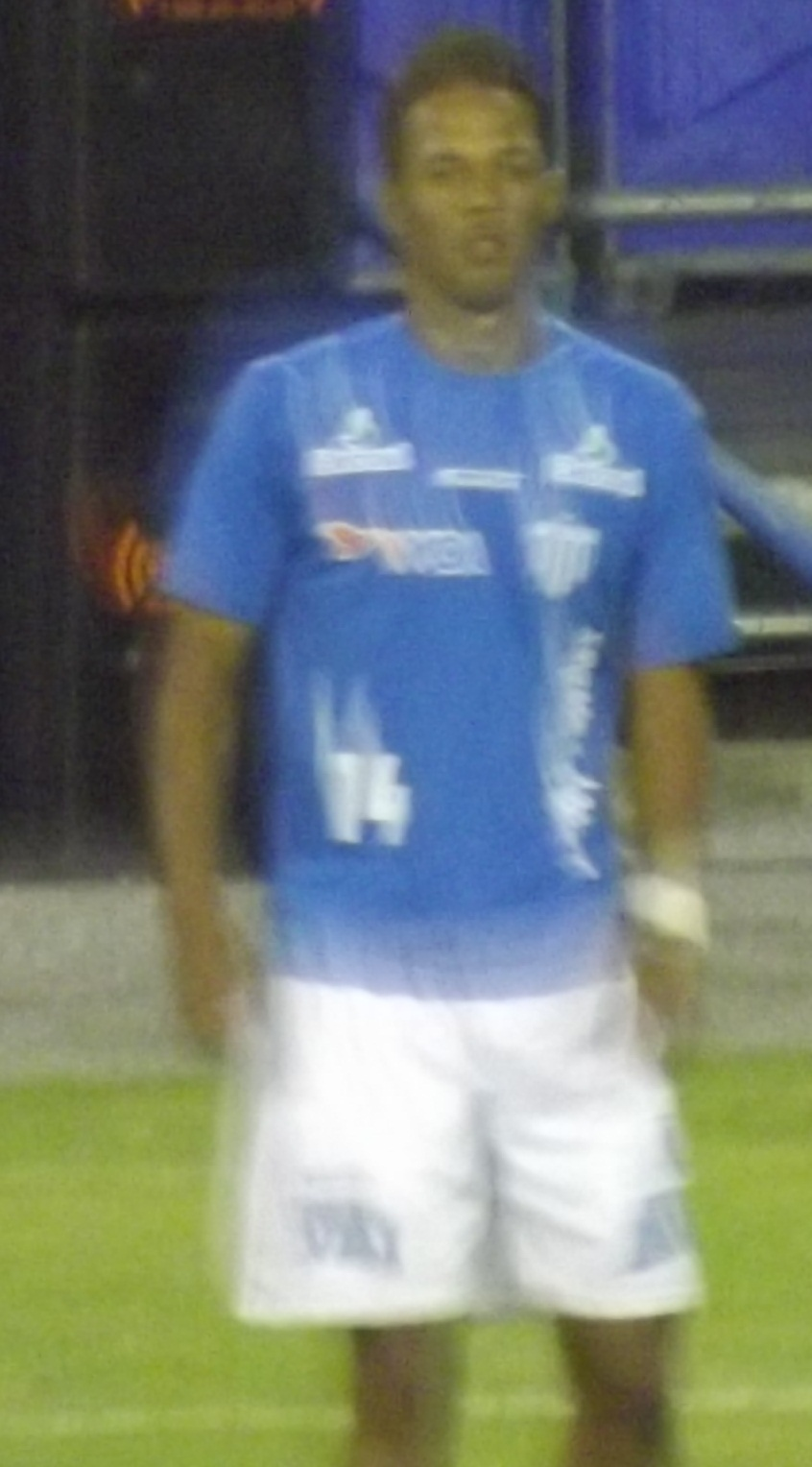

Personal information
- Full name: Bruno César Pereira da Silva
- Date of birth: 3 August 1986 (age 40)
- Place of birth: Nova Lima, Brazil
- Height: 1.79 m (5 ft 10 1/2 in)
- Position: Defensive midfielder

Team information
- Current team: Tombense

Youth career
- 2005: Villa Nova

Senior career*
Years	Team	Apps	(Gls)
2005	Villa Nova		
2006	Ipiranga		
2006	Uberaba		
2006	Social		
2007	Valeriodoce		
2007	Villa Nova		
2008–2012	Avaí	131	(4)
2009–2010	→ Bahia (loan)	33	(1)
2013–2015	Ponte Preta	45	(7)
2013	→ Atlético Paranaense (loan)	24	(0)
2014–2015	→ Chapecoense (loan)	53	(5)
2016–2017	Botafogo	100	(19)
2018	Cruzeiro	31	(2)
2019	Fluminense	23	(1)
2019	Internacional	9	(0)
2020–2022	Avaí	110	(4)
2023–	Tombense	2	(0)
- * Club domestic league appearances and goals as of 9 November 2022

Bruno César Pereira da Silva (born 3 August 1986), known as Bruno Silva, is a Brazilian footballer who plays for Tombense as a defensive midfielder.

== Career ==
Born in Nova Lima, Bruno started his footballing career at Villa Nova, also playing for Social and MG, before signing for Avaí in December 2007. He spent one and a half years in the Santa Catarina state team, and set up his transfer on loan to Bahia in 2009. After good performances with the club, Bruno extended his stay until the end of 2010. But in the middle of the year, Bruno had issues with the club's football manager, Paulo Angioni, and returned to Avai.

== Honours ==
=== Club ===
Avaí

- Campeonato Catarinense: 2009, 2012, 2021

Cruzeiro

- Campeonato Mineiro: 2018
- Copa do Brasil: 2018

=== Individual ===
- Campeonato Brasileiro Team of the Year: 2017
- Best Central Midfielder in Brazil: 2017
