= Rodrigo Alves (footballer) =

Brazilian footballer

Personal information
- Full name: Rodrigo Alves da Cruz
- Date of birth: 10 September 1995 (age 31)
- Place of birth: Assaí, Brazil
- Height: 1.71 m (5 ft 7 1/2 in)
- Position: Forward

Team information
- Current team: Velo Clube

Senior career*
Years	Team	Apps	(Gls)
2014–2015	Apucarana Sports	17	(3)
2016–2022	Cianorte	62	(11)
2016	→ Brusque (loan)	7	(0)
2016	→ Marcílio Dias (loan)	0	(0)
2017–2018	→ Chapecoense (loan)	3	(0)
2018	→ Atlético Tubarão (loan)	0	(0)
2018–2019	→ Bahia (loan)	0	(0)
2019	→ Brasil de Pelotas (loan)	19	(1)
2020–2021	→ Vila Nova (loan)	20	(0)
2021	→ São Bernardo (loan)		
2022–2025	Cascavel	57	(5)
2023	→ Maringá (loan)	13	(3)
2024	→ Remo (loan)	12	(1)
2025	Botafogo-PB	21	(2)
2026–	Velo Clube	7	(0)
2026	→ Itabaiana (loan)	19	(3)
- * Club domestic league appearances and goals as of 11 November 2026

Rodrigo Alves da Cruz (born 10 September 1995), known as Rodrigo Alves, is a Brazilian footballer who currently plays as a forward for Velo Clube.

== Career statistics ==
=== Club ===
As of 4 April 2019.

Club	Season	League			State League		Cup		Continental		Other		Total	
Club	Season	Division	Apps	Goals	Apps	Goals	Apps	Goals	Apps	Goals	Apps	Goals	Apps	Goals
Apucarana Sports	2014	Paranaense 2ª Divisão	—		7	1	—		—		—		7	1
Apucarana Sports	2015	Paranaense 2ª Divisão	—		10	2	—		—		—		10	2
Apucarana Sports	Total		—		17	3	—		—		—		17	3
Cianorte	2016	Paranaense 2ª Divisão	—		5	2	—		—		—		5	2
Cianorte	2017	Paranaense	—		10	1	—		—		—		10	1
Cianorte	2018	Série D	6	0	0	0	—		—		—		6	0
Cianorte	Total		6	0	15	3	—		—		—		21	3
Brusque (loan)	2016	Série D	7	0	—		—		—		—		7	0
Marcílio Dias (loan)	2016	Catarinense Série B	—		6	1	—		—		—		6	1
Chapecoense (loan)	2017	Série A	3	0	—		—		—		—		3	0
Chapecoense (loan)	2018	Série A	0	0	0	0	0	0	—		—		0	0
Chapecoense (loan)	Total		3	0	0	0	0	0	—		—		3	0
Atlético Tubarão (loan)	2018	Série D	0	0	3	0	—		—		—		3	0
Bahia	2018	Série A	0	0	—		—		—		—		0	0
Bahia	2019	Série A	0	0	2	0	0	0	—		—		2	0
Bahia	Total		0	0	2	0	0	0	—		—		0	0
Career total			16	0	43	7	0	0	0	0	0	0	59	7

== Honours ==
Cianorte

- Campeonato Paranaense 2ª Divisão: 2016
