= Hélder Santos =

Brazilian footballer (born 1988)

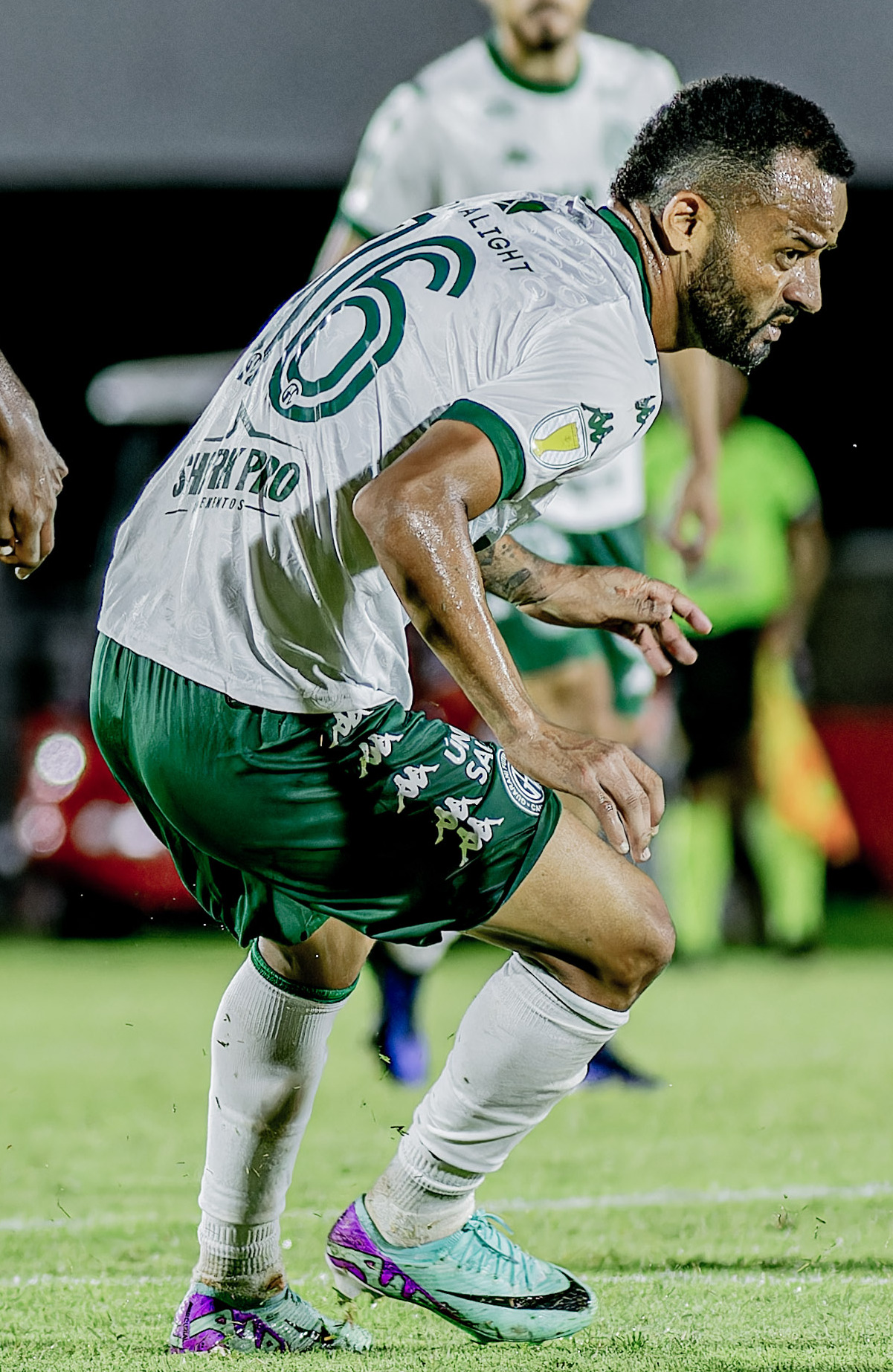
- Hélder with Guarani in 2024

Personal information
- Full name: Hélder Silva Santos
- Date of birth: 21 October 1988 (age 38)
- Place of birth: Três Corações, Brazil
- Height: 1.79 m (5 ft 10 in)
- Position: Left back

Team information
- Current team: Guarani
- Number: 16

Youth career
- –2007: Londrina
- 2007–2008: Grêmio

Senior career*
Years	Team	Apps	(Gls)
2008–2010	Grêmio	24	(0)
2009	→ Bahia (loan)	4	(0)
2010	→ Sertãozinho (loan)	8	(0)
2010–2013	Figueirense	69	(1)
2013–2015	Ceará	26	(1)
2015	→ Red Bull Brasil (loan)	2	(0)
2016	Maringá	5	(0)
2017–2018	Aparecidense	35	(4)
2018	→ Vila Nova (loan)	19	(1)
2019	Vila Nova	13	(1)
2020	Aparecidense	9	(0)
2020	Pelotas	0	(0)
2020	Juventude	22	(0)
2021–2023	Criciúma	93	(3)
2024–	Guarani	8	(0)
- * Club domestic league appearances and goals as of 20:25, 4 March 2024 (UTC)

Hélder Silva Santos (born 21 October 1988), known as Hélder Santos or just Hélder, is a Brazilian footballer who plays as a left back for Guarani.

== Career ==
Born in Três Corações, Minas Gerais, Hélder Santos began his career playing at Londrina youth ranks and managed to impress the Grêmio scouts after play against the club in Copa São Paulo de Futebol Júnior. In 2007, he joined Grêmio youth side and was promoted to the first squad in 2008. After the promotion he signed a long-term deal until 2011.

His first team debut occurred on 10 May 2008, in a Grêmio's 1-0 away win against São Paulo.

== Honours ==
Ceará

- Campeonato Cearense: 2014

Criciúma

- Campeonato Catarinense Série B: 2022
- Campeonato Catarinense: 2023
