= Echaporã (footballer) =

Brazilian footballer (born 2000)

Personal information
- Full name: Luis Otávio de Oliveira
- Date of birth: 17 February 2000 (age 26)
- Place of birth: Echaporã, Brazil
- Height: 1.69 m (5 ft 7 in)
- Position: Forward

Team information
- Current team: São Bernardo
- Number: 27

Youth career
- 2016–2017: São Paulo
- 2018–2020: Figueirense
- 2018–2020: → Atlético Mineiro (loan)

Senior career*
Years	Team	Apps	(Gls)
2019–2021	Figueirense	4	(0)
2021	→ Atlético Mineiro (loan)	5	(1)
2022–2025	Atlético Mineiro	3	(0)
2022	→ Ponte Preta (loan)	21	(1)
2023	→ Juventude (loan)	7	(1)
2024	→ Remo (loan)	12	(3)
2024	→ Londrina (loan)	12	(0)
2025–	São Bernardo	44	(4)
- * Club domestic league appearances and goals as of 18 November 2026

Luis Otávio de Oliveira (born 17 February 2000), commonly known as Echaporã, is a Brazilian footballer who plays as a forward for São Bernardo.

== Club career ==
Born in Echaporã, São Paulo, he represented São Paulo and Figueirense as a youth. He made his first team debut with the latter on 6 March 2019, coming on as a second-half substitute for Alípio in a 0–0 Campeonato Catarinense away draw against Marcílio Dias.

In September 2019, Echaporã moved Atlético Mineiro on loan with a buyout clause, and returned to the youth setup. On 14 November 2020, his loan was extended until the end of 2022.

Echaporã made his debut for Galo on 28 February 2021; after replacing Sávio, he scored his team's third in a 3–0 home win against URT, for the year's Campeonato Mineiro. His Série A debut occurred on 13 June, as he replaced Keno in a 1–0 home success over São Paulo. He signed a permanent two-year deal with Atlético in January 2022.

On 5 April 2022, Echaporã joined Série B club Ponte Preta on loan for the remainder of the season.

== Career statistics ==
As of 1 January 2025

Club	Season	League			State League		Cup		Continental		Other		Total	
Club	Season	Division	Apps	Goals	Apps	Goals	Apps	Goals	Apps	Goals	Apps	Goals	Apps	Goals
Figueirense	2019	Série B	0	0	1	0	—		—		—		1	0
Atlético Mineiro	2021	Série A	2	0	3	1	0	0	0	0	—		5	1
Atlético Mineiro	2022	Série A	0	0	3	0	0	0	0	0	0	0	3	0
Atlético Mineiro	Total		2	0	6	1	0	0	0	0	0	0	8	1
Ponte Preta	2022	Série B	21	1	—		—		—		—		21	1
Juventude	2023	Série B	3	0	4	1	—		—		—		7	1
Remo	2024	Série C	1	0	11	3	1	0	—		2 (Note: Appearance(s) in Copa Verde)	1	15	4
Londrina	2024	Série C	12	0	—		—		—		—		12	0
Career total			39	1	22	5	1	0	0	0	2	1	64	7

== Honours ==
Atlético Mineiro

- Campeonato Brasileiro Série A: 2021
- Copa do Brasil: 2021
- Campeonato Mineiro: 2021, 2022
- Supercopa do Brasil: 2022
- Campeonato Brasileiro Sub-20: 2020
