= Sillas (footballer) =

Brazilian footballer

Personal information
- Full name: Sillas da Silva Vital Gomes
- Date of birth: 5 May 1995 (age 31)
- Place of birth: Cajueiro, Brazil
- Height: 1.70 m (5 ft 7 in)
- Position: Central midfielder

Team information
- Current team: São Bernardo FC

Senior career*
Years	Team	Apps	(Gls)
2014	Comercial de Viçosa	4	(0)
2015	Sete de Setembro-AL		
2016–2017	Boa Esporte	18	(3)
2017	Campinense	6	(1)
2018	Vitória da Conquista	5	(0)
2018	Perilima	8	(4)
2019–2020	Santa Cruz	4	(0)
2019	→ Retrô (loan)	12	(3)
2020	Votuporanguense	3	(0)
2020	Cabofriense	14	(3)
2021	Madureira	13	(0)
2021	Paraná	29	(5)
2022–2023	São José-RS	51	(13)
2023–2024	Atlético Goianiense	6	(0)
2024	Remo	9	(3)
2024	Botafogo-PB	13	(1)
2025	Velo Clube	12	(4)
2025–	São Bernardo FC	13	(0)
- * Club domestic league appearances and goals as of 14 October 2025

Sillas da Silva Vital Gomes (born 5 May 1995), simply known as Sillas, is a Brazilian professional footballer who plays as a central midfielder for São Bernardo FC.

== Career ==
Having started his professional career at Boa Esporte in 2016, Sillas played for several Brazilian football teams. He gained prominence in the 2021 season playing for Paraná Clube, and in 2022 due to his excellent performance for EC São José during the 2022 Campeonato Brasileiro Série C dispute.

In 2023, he was hired by Atlético Goianiense where remained until March 2024, when terminated the contract and few days later transferred to Remo. In June 2024, Sillas signed with Botafogo-PB. In November 2024, Sillas was announced by the Velo Clube. In April, he was signed by São Bernardo FC.

== Honours ==
Boa Esporte

- Campeonato Brasileiro Série C: 2016

Atlético Goianiense

- Campeonato Goiano: 2024
