= Cajueiro =

Municipality in Alagoas, Brazil

- Municipality of Alagoas, Brazil
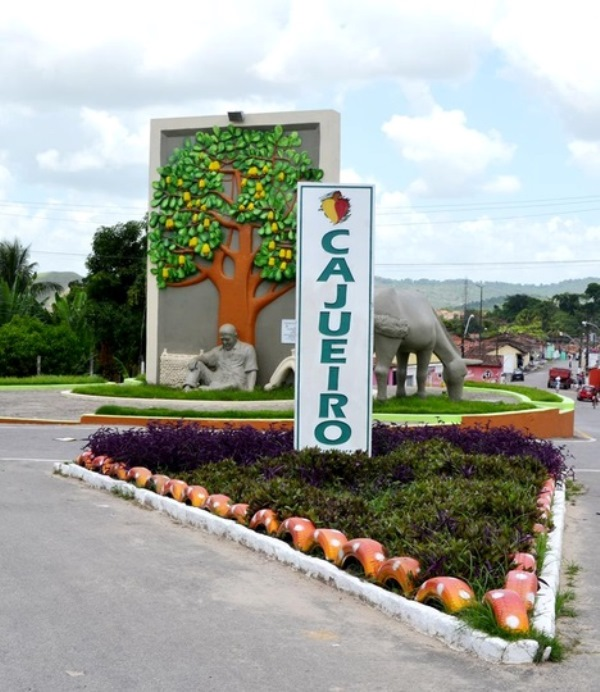
- Entrance to Cajueiro

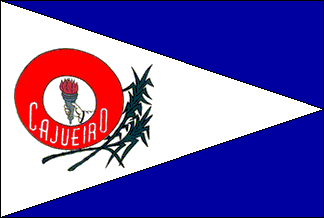
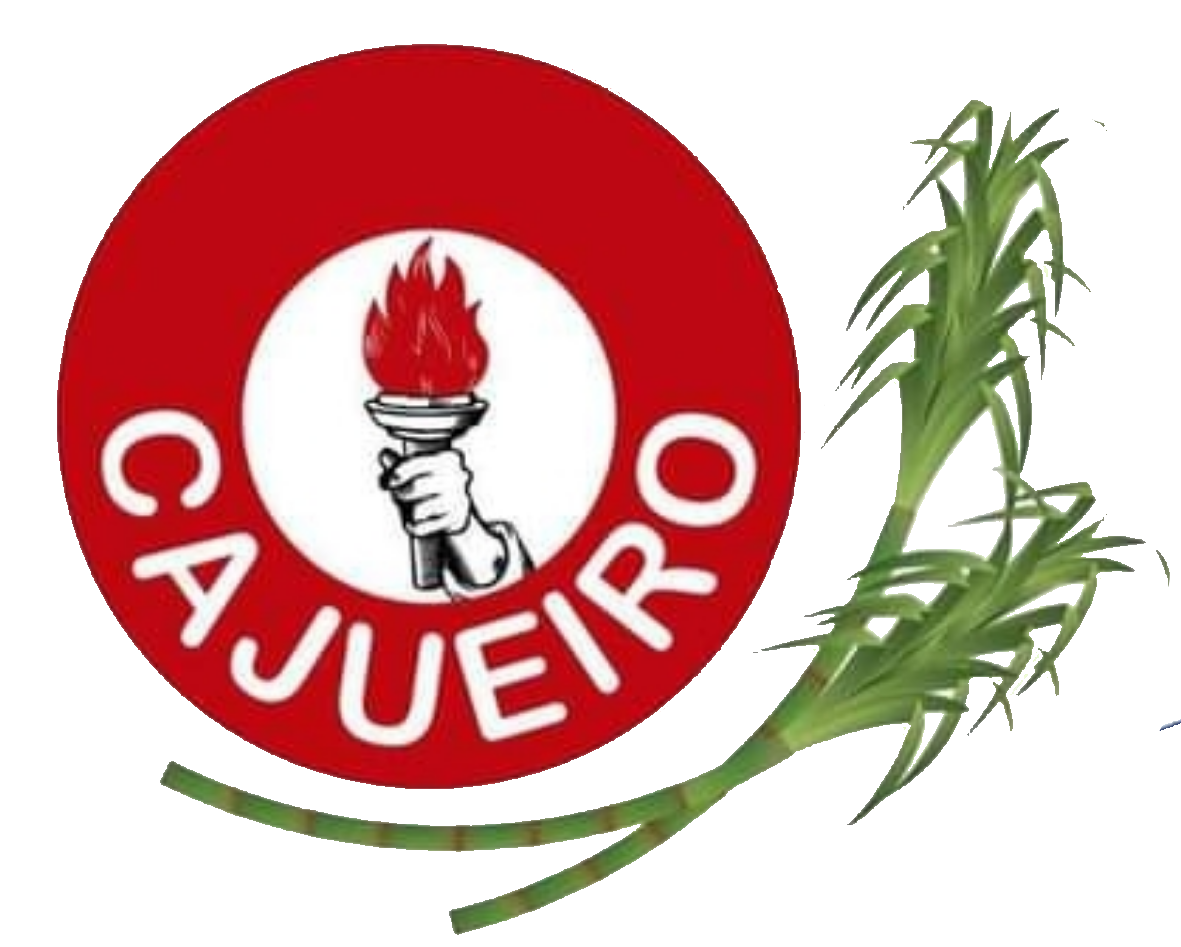
- Flag Coat of arms
- Etymology: In English "cashew tree", due to the existence of one in the area where migrants would rest their animals
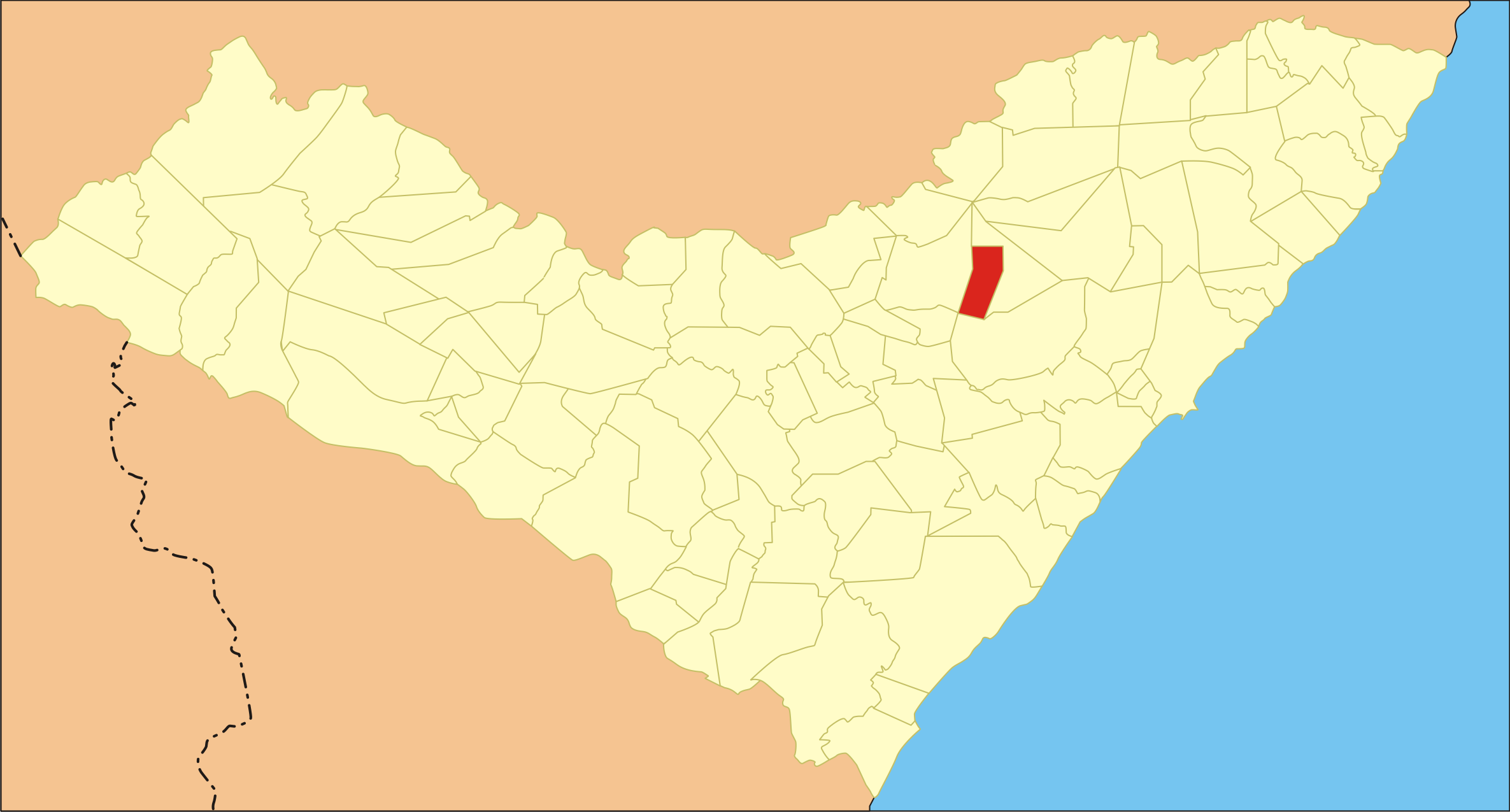
- Location of Cajueiro in Alagoas

- Location within Brazil Location within South America
- Coordinates: 9°23′48″S 36°9′13″W
- Country: Brazil
- Region: Northeast
- State: Alagoas
- Founded: 22 May 1958

Government
  - Mayor: Lucila Régia Albuquerque Toledo (MDB) (2025-2028)
  - Vice Mayor: Antonio Jorge de Melo Junior (MDB) (2025-2028)

Area
  - Total: 94.357 km^{2} (36.431 sq mi)
- Elevation: 90 m (300 ft)

Population (2022)
  - Total: 16,024
  - Density: 169.82/km^{2} (439.8/sq mi)
- Demonym: Cajueirense (Brazilian Portuguese)
- Time zone: UTC-03:00 (Brasília Time)
- Postal code: 57770-000
- HDI (2010): 0.562 – medium
- Website: cajueiro.al.gov.br

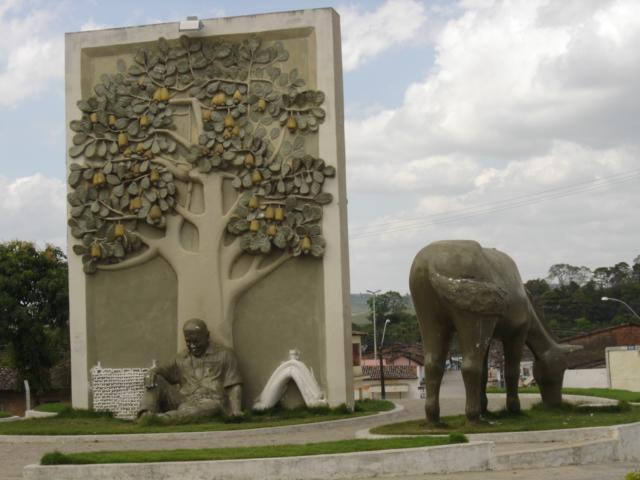
The Access Road to Cajueiro (Alagoas) Municipal.

Cajueiro (Central northeastern portuguese pronunciation: [ˌkaʒuˈeɾʊ]) is a municipality located in the western of the Brazilian state of Alagoas. Its population is 21,331 (2020) and its area is 124 km^{2} (48 sq mi). Its name comes from the Portuguese for the cashew tree — in the 19th century, a village began to form around such a tree, near the banks of the Paraíba river.

== See also ==
- List of municipalities in Alagoas
