= Itambé (footballer) =

Brazilian footballer

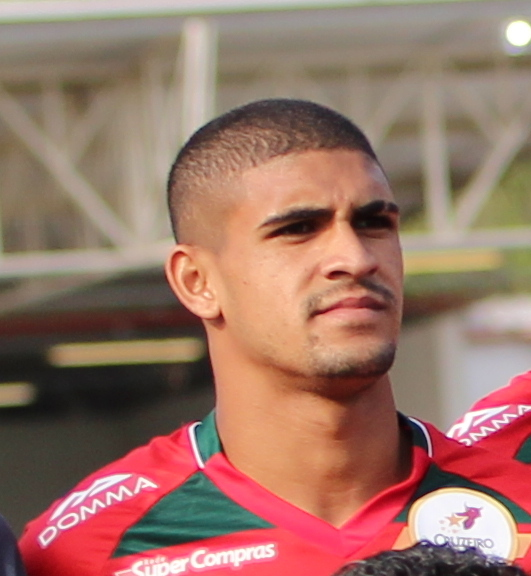
- Itambé in 2022

Personal information
- Full name: Carlos Eduardo Pontes Santos
- Date of birth: 21 December 2000 (age 25)
- Place of birth: Itambé, Brazil
- Height: 1.85 m (6 ft 1 in)
- Position: Centre-back

Team information
- Current team: Velo Clube

Youth career
- Náutico

Senior career*
Years	Team	Apps	(Gls)
2020	Náutico	2	(0)
2021–2022	Cianorte	10	(0)
2022	Portuguesa-RJ	8	(0)
2023	Portuguesa Santista	8	(0)
2023	→ São Bernardo (loan)	12	(0)
2024	São José-RS	10	(0)
2024	Sampaio Corrêa	11	(0)
2025–	Velo Clube	4	(0)
- * Club domestic league appearances and goals as of 18:32, 26 January 2025 (UTC)

Carlos Eduardo Pontes Santos (born 21 December 2000), known as Carlos Itambé or just Itambé, is a Brazilian footballer who plays as a centre-back for Velo Clube.

== Career ==
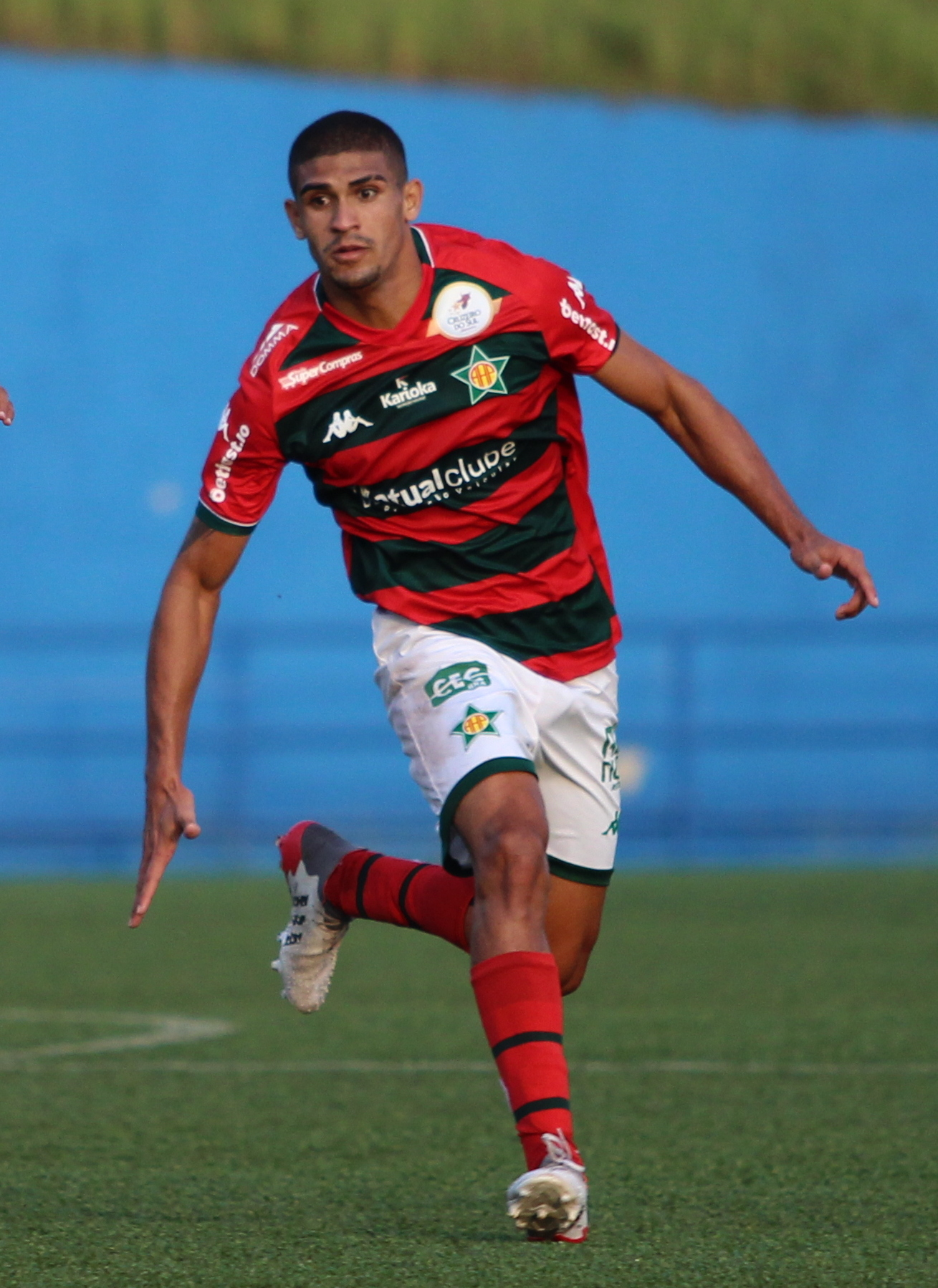
Itambé playing for Portuguesa-RJ in 2022

Born in Itambé, Pernambuco, he was nicknamed after his city of birth. A Náutico youth graduate, he made his first team debut on 26 January 2020, coming on as a late substitute in a 1–0 Campeonato Pernambucano away win over Petrolina.

On 7 January 2021, after just one further first team appearance, Itambé left the Timbu and signed for Cianorte. In March 2022, he moved to Portuguesa-RJ.

On 14 November 2022, Itambé was announced at Portuguesa Santista. The following 1 June, he agreed to a loan deal with São Bernardo.

On 16 November 2023, Itambé signed for fellow Série C side São José-RS. The following 21 March, he moved to Sampaio Corrêa of the same category, but left the club on 25 September of that year to join Velo Clube.

== Career statistics ==
As of 26 January 2025

Club	Season	League			State League		Cup		Continental		Other		Total	
Club	Season	Division	Apps	Goals	Apps	Goals	Apps	Goals	Apps	Goals	Apps	Goals	Apps	Goals
Náutico	2020	Série B	0	0	2	0	—		—		0	0	2	0
Cianorte	2021	Série D	4	0	0	0	0	0	—		—		4	0
Cianorte	2022	Série D	0	0	6	0	—		—		—		6	0
Cianorte	Total		4	0	6	0	0	0	—		—		10	0
Portuguesa-RJ	2022	Série D	8	0	—		2	0	—		3 (Note: Appearance(s) in Copa Rio)	1	13	1
Portuguesa Santista	2023	Paulista A2	—		8	0	—		—		—		8	0
São Bernardo (loan)	2023	Série C	12	0	—		—		—		—		12	0
São José-RS	2024	Série C	0	0	10	0	—		—		—		10	0
Sampaio Corrêa	2024	Série C	11	0	2	0	1	0	—		—		14	0
Velo Clube	2025	Paulista	—		4	0	—		—		—		4	0
Career total			35	0	32	0	3	0	0	0	3	1	73	1

== Honours ==
Sampaio Corrêa

- Campeonato Maranhense: 2024
