= Daniel (footballer, born 1996) =

Brazilian footballer

Personal information
- Full name: Daniel de Carvalho
- Date of birth: 13 May 1996 (age 30)
- Place of birth: São Bernardo do Campo, Brazil
- Height: 1.71 m (5 ft 7 in)
- Position: Midfielder

Team information
- Current team: ABC

Youth career
- 2013–2016: Palmeiras

Senior career*
| Years | Team | Apps | (Gls) |
| 2015–2019 | Palmeiras | 0 | (0) |
| 2017 | → Bragantino (loan) | 3 | (0) |
| 2018 | → Votuporanguense (loan) | 10 | (1) |
| 2019 | → Rio Claro (loan) | 12 | (1) |
| 2019 | → Ferroviária (loan) | 23 | (0) |
| 2020 | Caldense | 7 | (0) |
| 2020 | Boa Esporte | 5 | (0) |
| 2020–2022 | Mirassol | 81 | (1) |
| 2021 | → Votuporanguense (loan) | | |
| 2023– | ABC | 23 | (1) |
- * Club domestic league appearances and goals as of 7 November 2023

Daniel de Carvalho (born 13 May 1996), commonly known as Daniel, is a Brazilian footballer who plays as a midfielder for ABC.

== Career statistics ==
=== Club ===
As of 21 July 2019.

| Club | Season | League | | | State League | | Cup | | Continental | | Other | | Total | |
| Club | Season | Division | Apps | Goals | Apps | Goals | Apps | Goals | Apps | Goals | Apps | Goals | Apps | Goals |
|---|---|---|---|---|---|---|---|---|---|---|---|---|---|---|
| Palmeiras | 2017 | Série A | 0 | 0 | 0 | 0 | 0 | 0 | – | | 0 | 0 | 0 | 0 |
| Palmeiras | 2018 | Série A | 0 | 0 | 0 | 0 | 0 | 0 | – | | 0 | 0 | 0 | 0 |
| Palmeiras | 2019 | Série A | 0 | 0 | 0 | 0 | 0 | 0 | – | | 0 | 0 | 0 | 0 |
| Palmeiras | Total | | 0 | 0 | 0 | 0 | 0 | 0 | 0 | 0 | 0 | 0 | 0 | 0 |
| Bragantino (loan) | 2017 | Série C | 2 | 0 | 1 (Note: Appearances in the Campeonato Paulista A2) | 0 | 0 | 0 | – | | 0 | 0 | 3 | 0 |
| Votuporanguense (loan) | 2018 | – | | | 10 | 1 | 0 | 0 | – | | 0 | 0 | 10 | 1 |
| Rio Claro (loan) | 2019 | – | | | 12 | 1 | 0 | 0 | – | | 0 | 0 | 12 | 1 |
| Ferroviária (loan) | 2019 | Série D | 8 | 0 | 0 | 0 | 0 | 0 | – | | 4 (Note: Appearances in the Copa Paulista) | 0 | 12 | 0 |
| Career total | | | 10 | 0 | 23 | 2 | 0 | 0 | 0 | 0 | 4 | 0 | 37 | 2 |
