= Guilherme Cachoeira =

Brazilian footballer

Personal information
- Full name: Guilherme Cachoeira Silveira
- Date of birth: 25 April 2002 (age 24)
- Place of birth: Joinville, Brazil
- Height: 1.67 m (5 ft 6 in)
- Position: Forward

Team information
- Current team: Londrina (on loan from Guarani)
- Number: 27

Youth career
- 2017–2021: São Paulo
- 2021–2022: Vasco da Gama

Senior career*
Years	Team	Apps	(Gls)
2023	Volta Redonda	5	(0)
2023	Inter de Bebedouro	3	(0)
2023–2024	Joinville	21	(6)
2024–	Fortaleza	0	(0)
2024	→ Remo (loan)	8	(0)
2025	→ CSA (loan)	28	(4)
2025	→ Athletic (loan)	10	(0)
2026–	Guarani	21	(5)
2026–	→ Londrina (loan)	7	(1)

International career
2019	Brazil U17	1	(0)
- * Club domestic league appearances and goals as of 18 November 2026

Guilherme Cachoeira Silveira (born 25 April 2002) is a Brazilian professional footballer who plays as a forward for Londrina, on loan from Guarani.

== Club career ==
Revealed by the youth sectors of São Paulo FC, Cachoeira played for the club until August 2021, when he transferred to CR Vasco da Gama. He debuted as a professional in 2023 for Volta Redonda FC, and subsequently played for Inter de Bebedouro and Joinville.

Shortly after competing in the 2024 Campeonato Catarinense, Cachoeira signed a four-year contract with Fortaleza EC, and was immediately loaned to Remo, where he made eight appearances in the 2024 Campeonato Brasileiro Série C, participating in the club's access campaign. For the 2025 season he was loaned out once again, this time to CSA.

== International career ==
Cachoeira was part of the squad that represented the Brazil national team at the 2019 South American U-17 Championship.
