= Reniê =

Brazilian footballer

Personal information
- Full name: Reniê Almeida da Silva
- Date of birth: 10 April 1989 (age 37)
- Place of birth: Feira de Santana, Brazil
- Height: 1.83 m (6 ft 0 in)
- Position: Centre-back

Team information
- Current team: Porto Vitória

Senior career*
Years	Team	Apps	(Gls)
2009–2013	Vitória	35	(0)
2012	→ Botafogo-SP (loan)	9	(2)
2012	→ Atlético Goianiense (loan)	28	(3)
2014	Comercial-SP	10	(0)
2014	Paysandu	11	(0)
2015	Guarani	0	(0)
2015	→ Volta Redonda (loan)	24	(2)
2016	Mirassol	23	(1)
2016	Vila Nova	12	(0)
2017	Santo André	12	(0)
2019	Guarani MG	1	(0)
2019	Tombense	10	(0)
2019–2021	Mirassol	39	(3)
2020	→ Operário Ferroviário (loan)	25	(1)
2021–2022	Operário Ferroviário	83	(1)
2023	Mirassol	3	(0)
2024-2025	Botafogo-PB	31	(1)
2026–	Porto Vitória	0	(0)
- * Club domestic league appearances and goals as of 1 January 2026

Reniê Almeida da Silva (born 10 April 1989) is a Brazilian professional footballer who plays as a centre-back for Porto Vitória.

== Honours ==
Vitória

- Campeonato Baiano: 2009, 2010, 2013
- Copa do Nordeste: 2010

Porto Vitória

- Campeonato Capixaba: 2026
