= Adsson =

Brazilian footballer (born 2000)

Personal information
- Full name: Adsson Igor Marinho de Lima
- Date of birth: 24 May 2000 (age 26)
- Place of birth: Rio Largo, Brazil
- Height: 1.76 m (5 ft 9 in)
- Position: Defensive midfielder

Team information
- Current team: Volta Redonda

Youth career
- 2016: Sete de Setembro-AL
- 2017: Atlético Tubarão
- 2018: Joinville
- 2019–2020: CRB

Senior career*
Years	Team	Apps	(Gls)
2020–2021	CRB	5	(0)
2021	→ Sergipe (loan)	7	(0)
2022–2025	Bangu	31	(1)
2022	→ Sampaio Corrêa-RJ (loan)	11	(1)
2023	→ Portuguesa (loan)	0	(0)
2024	→ Remo (loan)	8	(0)
2025	→ SC Aymorés (loan)	8	(0)
2025	→ Pouso Alegre (loan)	13	(2)
2025–	Volta Redonda	3	(0)
- * Club domestic league appearances and goals as of 19 December 2025

Adsson Igor Marinho de Lima (born 24 May 2000), simply known as Adsson, is a Brazilian footballer who plays as a defensive midfielder for Volta Redonda.

== Club career ==
Born in Rio Largo, Alagoas, Adsson started playing for local side Sete de Setembro-AL before subsequently Atlético Tubarão and Joinville. With the latter side, he appeared as an unused substitute with the first team in the 2018 Copa Santa Catarina.

Adsson returned to his home state in 2019, joining CRB and being initially assigned to the under-20 team. He signed his first professional contract on 13 December of that year, and made his senior debut with the club on 7 March 2020, replacing Bruno Cosendey in a 2–0 Campeonato Alagoano home win over CEO.

In May 2020, CRB extended Adsson's contract for a further year. On 24 March 2021, after featuring rarely, he was loaned to Sergipe until the end of the year, and won the Campeonato Sergipano with the side.

Adsson began the 2022 season at Bangu, but was loaned to Sampaio Corrêa-RJ in April of that year. Back to Bangu for the 2023 Campeonato Carioca, he featured regularly before joining Portuguesa on 30 May 2023, also on loan.

== Personal life ==
Adsson's father Adilson was also a footballer and a defensive midfielder. He too played for CRB and Sergipe, aside from Náutico.

== Career statistics ==
As of 1 November 2023

Club	Season	League			State League		Cup		Continental		Other		Total	
Club	Season	Division	Apps	Goals	Apps	Goals	Apps	Goals	Apps	Goals	Apps	Goals	Apps	Goals
CRB	2020	Série B	4	0	1	0	0	0	—		1 (Note: Appearance(s) in Copa do Nordeste)	0	6	0
CRB	2021	Série B	0	0	0	0	0	0	—		0	0	0	0
CRB	Total		4	0	1	0	0	0	—		1	0	6	0
Sergipe (loan)	2021	Série D	0	0	7	0	—		—		—		7	0
Bangu	2022	Carioca	—		10	0	—		—		—		10	0
Bangu	2023	Carioca	—		10	0	—		—		—		10	0
Bangu	Total		—		20	0	—		—		—		20	0
Sampaio Corrêa-RJ (loan)	2022	Carioca Série A2	—		11	1	—		—		2 (Note: Appearance(s) in Copa Rio)	0	13	1
Portuguesa (loan)	2023	Paulista	—		0	0	—		—		1 (Note: Appearance(s) in Copa Paulista)	0	1	0
Career total			4	0	39	1	1	0	0	0	4	0	48	1

== Honours ==
CRB

- Campeonato Alagoano: 2020

Sergipe

- Campeonato Sergipano: 2021
