= João Afonso (footballer, born 1995) =

Brazilian footballer

Personal information
- Full name: João Afonso Crispim
- Date of birth: 9 February 1995 (age 31)
- Place of birth: Criciúma, Brazil
- Height: 1.81 m (5 ft 11 in)
- Position: Defensive midfielder

Team information
- Current team: Rayong
- Number: 6

Youth career
- Internacional

Senior career*
Years	Team	Apps	(Gls)
2012–2013	Novo Hamburgo	1	(0)
2013–	Internacional	21	(0)
2015–2016	→ Chapecoense (loan)	6	(0)
2016	→ Criciúma (loan)	17	(0)
2017	→ Brasil de Pelotas (loan)	43	(1)
2018–2019	Goiás	35	(0)
2019–2022	Gil Vicente	59	(0)
2022–2023	Marítimo	24	(0)
2023–2024	Novorizontino	6	(0)
2024–2025	Remo	13	(0)
2025	Anápolis	17	(0)
2025–	Rayong	7	(0)
- * Club domestic league appearances and goals as of 9 January 2026

João Afonso Crispim (born 9 February 1995), known as João Afonso, is a Brazilian professional footballer who plays as a defensive midfielder for Rayong in the Thai League 1.

== Career ==
João Afonso is a youth product from Sport Club Internacional. He made his Série A debut at 13 October 2013 against Náutico.

On 29 June 2019, Afonso joined Portuguese club Gil Vicente. After three seasons playing for the Barcelos club, Afonso moved to Marítimo in 2022.

On 28 July 2023, Série B side Novorizontino announced the signing of Afonso on a contract until April 2024.
