= Lucas Souza (footballer, born 1998) =

Brazilian footballer

Personal information
- Full name: Lucas do Carmo Souza
- Date of birth: 6 January 1998 (age 28)
- Place of birth: Pontalina, Brazil
- Height: 1.87 m (6 ft 2 in)
- Position: Centre-back

Team information
- Current team: ABC

Youth career
- –2018: Goiás

Senior career*
Years	Team	Apps	(Gls)
2018–2019	Goiás		
2018	→ Morrinhos (loan)		
2019	Rondoniense		
2019	América-GO		
2020–2023	Altos	86	(4)
2021	→ América-GO (loan)	4	(0)
2022	→ Operário Ferroviário (loan)	5	(0)
2023–2024	Joinville	15	(2)
2024–2025	Volta Redonda	26	(1)
2025	Confiança	4	(0)
2026–	ABC	14	(1)
- * Club domestic league appearances and goals as of 18 November 2026

Lucas do Carmo Souza (born 6 January 1998), simply known as Lucas Souza, is a Brazilian professional footballer who plays as a centre-back for ABC.

== Career ==
Revealed by Goiás EC, Lucas Souza played for teams in the state in the first part of his career. In 2021, he arrived at Altos-PI where he was state champion, and later played for Operário Ferroviário on loan, and for Joinville. In March 2024, he was hired by Volta Redonda FC, where he became champion of Série C and was chosen by the "Nosso Futebol" award as the best defender in the championship. In April 2025, Souza was hired by AD Confiança.

== Honours ==
Altos

- Campeonato Piauiense: 2021

Volta Redonda

- Campeonato Brasileiro Série C: 2024
