= Diogo Batista =

Brazilian footballer (born 2003)

Personal information
- Full name: Diogo Batista de Souza
- Date of birth: 29 August 2003 (age 23)
- Place of birth: Pedras de Maria da Cruz, Brazil
- Position: Right back

Team information
- Current team: Athletic
- Number: 5

Youth career
- PSTC
- 2019–2023: Coritiba

Senior career*
Years	Team	Apps	(Gls)
2023–2026	Coritiba	20	(0)
2024	→ Remo (loan)	18	(1)
2025	→ Água Santa (loan)	7	(1)
2025	→ CSA (loan)	6	(0)
2026–	Athletic	28	(1)
- * Club domestic league appearances and goals as of 18 November 2026

Diogo Batista de Souza (born 29 August 2003), known as Diogo Batista or just Diogo, is a Brazilian footballer who plays as a right back for Athletic.

== Club career ==
Born in Pedras de Maria da Cruz, Minas Gerais, Diogo joined Coritiba's youth setup in 2019, aged 16, from PSTC. On 19 December 2022, he signed a new contract with the club.

On 17 February 2023, after being promoted to the main squad, Diogo further extended his contract until the end of 2024. He made his first team – and Série A – debut on 3 July, starting in a 2–1 away win over Goiás.

== Career statistics ==
As of 16 July 2024

Club	Season	League			State League		Cup		Continental		Other		Total	
Club	Season	Division	Apps	Goals	Apps	Goals	Apps	Goals	Apps	Goals	Apps	Goals	Apps	Goals
Coritiba	2023	Série A	11	0	0	0	0	0	—		—		11	0
Coritiba	2024	Série B	0	0	7	0	0	0	—		—		7	0
Coritiba	Total		11	0	7	0	0	0	—		—		18	0
Remo (loan)	2024	Série C	7	0	—		—		—		—		7	0
Career total			18	0	7	0	0	0	0	0	0	0	25	0
