= Matheus Nogueira (footballer, born 1997) =

Brazilian footballer

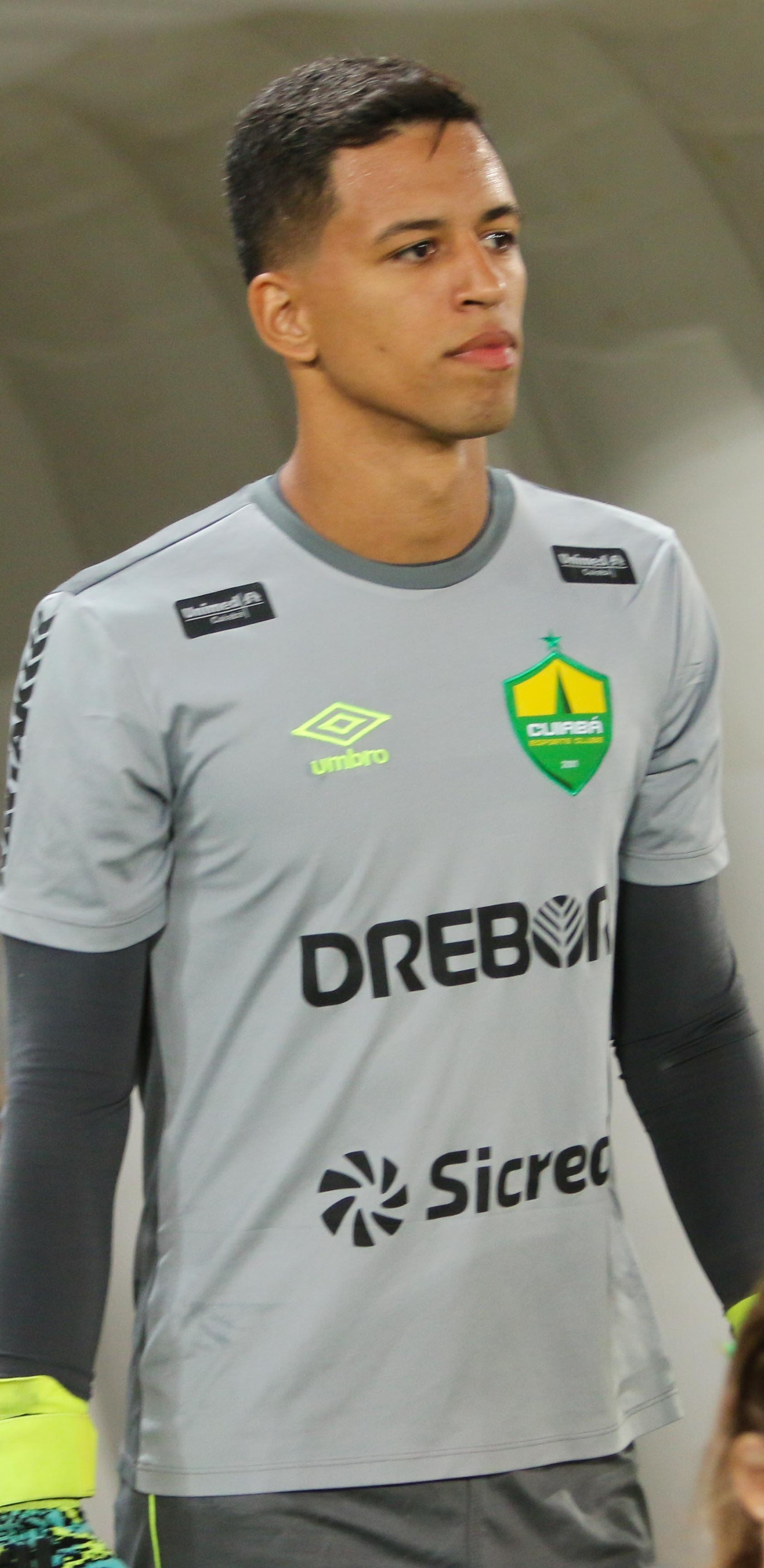

Personal information
- Full name: Matheus Vinícius Matos Nogueira
- Date of birth: 20 September 1997 (age 29)
- Place of birth: Jaciara, Brazil
- Height: 1.91 m (6 ft 3 in)
- Position: Goalkeeper

Team information
- Current team: Ceará (on loan from Paysandu)
- Number: 22

Youth career
- 2012–2017: Grêmio

Senior career*
Years	Team	Apps	(Gls)
2016–2017	Grêmio	0	(0)
2017	→ Goiânia (loan)	0	(0)
2018	CEOV	10	(0)
2018–2022	Cuiabá	23	(0)
2021	→ XV de Piracicaba (loan)	17	(0)
2022	ABC	16	(0)
2023–2024	Portimonense	0	(0)
2023–2024	→ Paysandu (loan)	45	(0)
2025–	Paysandu	32	(0)
2023	→ São Bernardo (loan)	0	(0)
2026–	→ Ceará (loan)	2	(0)
- * Club domestic league appearances and goals as of 18 November 2026

Matheus Vinícius Matos Nogueira (born 20 September 1997), simply known as Matheus Nogueira, is a Brazilian professional footballer who plays as a goalkeeper for Ceará Sporting Club, on loan from Paysandu.

== Career ==
Revealed in the Grêmio youth sectors, Matheus Nogueira had spells at Goiânia and Operário Várzea-grandense, before arriving at Cuiabá, where he was part of the state and Copa Verde champion squad in 2019. He was later loaned to XV de Piracicaba and traded with ABC, where he was champion in 2022. In December, he was traded to Portimonense. Without being used in the Portuguese team, he was loaned to Paysandu, where he was state champion in 2024.

== Honours ==
Cuiabá

- Copa Verde: 2019
- Campeonato Mato-Grossense: 2019

ABC

- Campeonato Potiguar: 2022

Paysandu

- Campeonato Paraense: 2024
- Copa Verde: 2024, 2025
