= Raimar (footballer) =

Brazilian footballer (born 2002)

Personal information
- Full name: Raimar Rodrigues Lopes
- Date of birth: 27 May 2002 (age 24)
- Place of birth: Manaus, Brazil
- Height: 1.75 m (5 ft 9 in)
- Position: Left-back

Team information
- Current team: Brusque
- Number: 6

Youth career
- 2017–2019: Paraná
- 2019–2020: Athletico Paranaense

Senior career*
Years	Team	Apps	(Gls)
2020–2022	Athletico Paranaense	1	(0)
2021	→ Remo (loan)	13	(0)
2022–2023	Atlanta United 2	33	(5)
2023–2024	Nacional	0	(0)
2024	Remo	28	(2)
2025	Amazonas	3	(0)
2025	Náutico	9	(0)
2026–	Brusque	35	(1)
- * Club domestic league appearances and goals as of 9 November 2026

Raimar Rodrigues Lopes (born 27 May 2002) is a Brazilian professional footballer who plays as a left-back for Série C club Brusque.

== Career ==
=== Atlanta United 2 ===
On 2 March 2022, USL Championship side Atlanta United 2 announced that they had signed Raimar. Raimar debuted for Atlanta on 5 May 2022, during a 4–0 loss to Louisville City FC. On 14 June 2022, he was named USL Championship Player of the Week for Week 14 of the 2022 season after scoring both goals in Atlanta's victory over Loudoun United FC.

=== Nacional ===
On 17 July 2023, it was announced that Raimar would be singing with Portuguese club Nacional.

=== Return to Remo ===
On 11 December 2023, Brazilian Série C club Remo announced that Raimar would return to the club, this time on a permanent deal, on 1 January 2024.

== Honours ==
Athletico Paranaense

- Campeonato Paranaense: 2020

Remo

- Copa Verde: 2021
