= Netinho (footballer, born 1997) =

Brazilian footballer

Personal information
- Full name: José Domingos de Moraes Neto
- Date of birth: 18 December 1997 (age 28)
- Place of birth: Rio de Janeiro, Brazil
- Height: 1.80 m (5 ft 11 in)
- Position: Defensive midfielder

Team information
- Current team: Atlético Goianiense

Youth career
- Botafogo
- 2015: Vasco da Gama
- 2016–2017: Nova Iguaçu
- 2017–2018: Bangu

Senior career*
| Years | Team | Apps | (Gls) |
| 2018 | Bangu | 1 | (0) |
| 2019 | Rio Claro | 0 | (0) |
| 2020 | Bangu | 0 | (0) |
| 2020 | Jabaquara | 9 | (0) |
| 2022 | Portuguesa-RJ | 33 | (1) |
| 2023 | Ipatinga | 7 | (2) |
| 2023 | Botafogo-PB | 19 | (2) |
| 2024 | Paysandu | 37 | (2) |
| 2025–2026 | Água Santa | 27 | (5) |
| 2025 | → Ferroviária (loan) | 31 | (4) |
| 2026– | Atlético Goianiense | 0 | (0) |
- * Club domestic league appearances and goals as of 18 December 2025

José Domingos de Moraes Neto (born 18 December 1997), commonly known as Netinho, is a Brazilian footballer who plays as a defensive midfielder for Atlético Goianiense.

== Career ==
Born in Rio de Janeiro, Netinho represented Botafogo, Vasco da Gama, Nova Iguaçu and Bangu as a youth. He made his senior debut with the latter on 8 August 2018, coming on as a second-half substitute in a 0–0 away draw against Friburguense, for the year's Copa Rio.

On 26 November 2018, Netinho moved to Rio Claro, but did not play. He then returned to Bangu, before joining Jabaquara.

In 2021, Netinho played seven-a-side football with Vasco and Flamengo, before returning to football with Portuguesa-RJ for the 2022 campaign.

In December 2022, Netinho signed for Ipatinga, but moved to Botafogo-PB the following 10 April. On 20 October 2023, after missing out promotion, he left the latter club.

On 6 December 2023, Netinho was announced at Série B side Paysandu.

== Personal life ==
Netinho is the grandson of Dominguinhos, a well-known artist in the Northeast.

== Career statistics ==
As of 17 February 2025.

| Club | Season | League | | | State League | | Cup | | Continental | | Other | | Total | |
| Club | Season | Division | Apps | Goals | Apps | Goals | Apps | Goals | Apps | Goals | Apps | Goals | Apps | Goals |
|---|---|---|---|---|---|---|---|---|---|---|---|---|---|---|
| Bangu | 2018 | Carioca | — | | 0 | 0 | — | | — | | 1 (Note: Appearance(s) in Copa Rio) | 0 | 1 | 0 |
| Rio Claro | 2019 | Paulista A2 | — | | 0 | 0 | — | | — | | — | | 0 | 0 |
| Jabaquara | 2020 | Paulista 2ª Divisão | — | | 9 | 0 | — | | — | | — | | 9 | 0 |
| Portuguesa-RJ | 2022 | Série D | 17 | 1 | 8 | 0 | 1 | 0 | — | | 7 | 0 | 33 | 1 |
| Ipatinga | 2023 | Mineiro | — | | 7 | 2 | — | | — | | — | | 7 | 2 |
| Botafogo-PB | 2023 | Série C | 19 | 2 | — | | — | | — | | — | | 19 | 2 |
| Paysandu | 2024 | Série B | 27 | 2 | 7 | 0 | 0 | 0 | — | | 3 (Note: Appearance(s) in Copa Verde) | 0 | 37 | 2 |
| Água Santa | 2025 | Série D | 0 | 0 | 9 | 2 | — | | — | | — | | 9 | 2 |
| Career total | | | 63 | 5 | 40 | 4 | 1 | 0 | 0 | 0 | 11 | 0 | 115 | 9 |

== Honours ==
Paysandu

- Copa Verde: 2024
- Campeonato Paraense: 2024
