= Marcelo Rangel =

Brazilian footballer

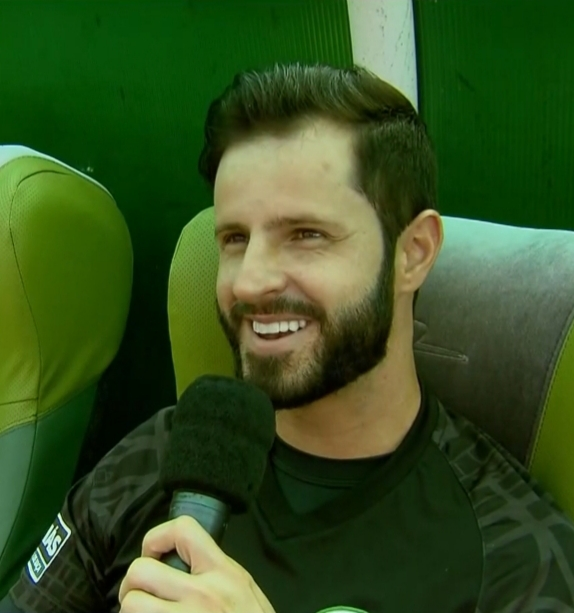
- Rangel in 2021

Personal information
- Full name: Marcelo Rangel Rosa
- Date of birth: 17 May 1988 (age 38)
- Place of birth: Marechal Cândido Rondon, Brazil
- Height: 1.86 m (6 ft 1 in)
- Position: Goalkeeper

Team information
- Current team: Remo
- Number: 88

Youth career
- 2005–2010: PSTC
- 2010–2011: Chapecoense

Senior career*
Years	Team	Apps	(Gls)
2011–2013	Cianorte	30	(0)
2014	Operário Ferroviário	15	(0)
2014–2016	Londrina	52	(0)
2017–2023	Goiás	114	(0)
2024–	Remo	125	(0)
- * Club domestic league appearances and goals as of 15 August 2026

Marcelo Rangel Rosa (born 17 May 1988) is a Brazilian professional footballer who plays as a goalkeeper for Remo.

== Career ==
Rangel made his professional debut with Cianorte in a 1–0 Campeonato Brasileiro Série D win over Cruzeiro RS on 17 July 2011.

== Honours ==
Goiás

- Campeonato Goiano: 2017, 2018
- Copa Verde: 2023

Remo

- Campeonato Paraense: 2025; runner-up: 2024, 2026
- Super Copa Grão-Pará: 2026
