= Val (footballer, born 1997) =

Brazilian footballer

Personal information
- Full name: Valdemir de Oliveira Soares
- Date of birth: 12 March 1997 (age 29)
- Place of birth: Tailândia, Brazil
- Height: 1.76 m (5 ft 9 1/2 in)
- Position: Midfielder

Team information
- Current team: América MG
- Number: 97

Youth career
- 2014: Portuguesa-RJ
- 2015: Goiás
- 2015–2017: Internacional

Senior career*
Years	Team	Apps	(Gls)
2017–2019	Internacional	10	(1)
2018	→ Brasil de Pelotas (loan)	22	(2)
2019	→ ABC (loan)	29	(0)
2020–2021	Botafogo-SP	37	(1)
2021–2023	Coritiba	74	(4)
2023–2024	Marítimo	18	(1)
2024	→ Paysandu (loan)	20	(2)
2025	EC Vitória	2	(1)
2025	Ventforet Kofu	18	(0)
2026–	América MG	4	(0)
- * Club domestic league appearances and goals as of 22 January 2026

Valdemir de Oliveira Soares (born 12 March 1997), known as Val, is a Brazilian professional footballer who plays as a midfielder for Série B club América MG.

== Career statistics ==
As of 10 August 2021

Club	Season	League			State league		Cup		Continental		Other		Total	
Club	Season	Division	Apps	Goals	Apps	Goals	Apps	Goals	Apps	Goals	Apps	Goals	Apps	Goals
Internacional	2017	Série B	2	0	0	0	1	0	—		1 (Note: Appearance(s) in Primeira Liga)	0	4	0
Internacional	2019	Série A	0	0	—		0	0	0	0	6 (Note: Appearance(s) in Copa FGF)	1	6	1
Internacional	Total		2	0	0	0	1	0	0	0	7	1	10	1
Brasil de Pelotas (loan)	2018	Série B	15	1	7	1	—		—		0	0	22	2
ABC (loan)	2019	Série C	8	0	10	0	3	0	—		8 (Note: Appearance(s) in Copa do Nordeste)	0	29	0
Botafogo-SP	2020	Série B	30	0	7	1	—		—		0	0	37	1
Coritiba	2021	Série B	15	2	7	1	4	0	—		0	0	26	3
Career total			70	3	31	3	8	0	0	0	15	1	124	7

== Honours ==
Brasil de Pelotas

- Taça Centenário: 2018

Paysandu

- Campeonato Paraense: 2024
- Copa Verde: 2024
