= Cristiano Vidal =

Brazilian footballer (born 1996)

Vidal
Personal information
- Full name: Cristiano da Silva Vidal
- Date of birth: 23 August 1996 (age 30)
- Place of birth: Não-Me-Toque, Brazil
- Height: 1.74 m (5 ft 9 in)
- Position: Right back

Team information
- Current team: Inter de Limeira

Senior career*
Years	Team	Apps	(Gls)
2016–2020	Juventude	75	(1)
2020–2021	Goiás	6	(0)
2021	→ Brasil de Pelotas (loan)	35	(1)
2022	Ferroviária	8	(1)
2022–2024	Botafogo-SP	38	(0)
2024	Remo	13	(0)
2025	Pelotas	8	(0)
2025	CSA	2	(0)
2026–	Inter de Limeira	4	(0)
- * Club domestic league appearances and goals as of 9 November 2026

Cristiano da Silva Vidal (born 23 August 1996), commonly known as Vidal, is a Brazilian professional footballer who plays as a right back for Inter de Limeira.

== Professional career ==
Vidal made his professional debut with Juventude in a 1-0 Campeonato Gaúcho win over Passo Fundo on 5 February 2017.
