= Ytalo =

Brazilian footballer (born 1988)

Personal information
- Full name: Ytalo José Oliveira dos Santos
- Date of birth: 12 January 1988 (age 38)
- Place of birth: Maceió, Brazil
- Height: 1.81 m (5 ft 11 1/2 in)
- Position: Forward

Team information
- Current team: Joinville

Youth career
- Corinthians Alagoano

Senior career*
Years	Team	Apps	(Gls)
2005	Corinthians Alagoano		
2006–2010	Marítimo	13	(2)
2006–2009	Marítimo B	39	(15)
2009–2010	→ Internacional (loan)	3	(1)
2011–2012	Internacional	0	(0)
2011	→ Mogi Mirim (loan)	8	(2)
2012–2013	Marítimo B	11	(3)
2013	Marítimo	3	(0)
2014	Paulista	2	(1)
2014–2016	Audax	34	(8)
2014	→ Guaratinguetá (loan)	17	(12)
2015	→ Atlético Paranaense (loan)	16	(1)
2016–2017	São Paulo	12	(1)
2017	→ Audax (loan)	12	(1)
2017	CRB	8	(1)
2017	FK Vardar	11	(3)
2018	Linense	4	(0)
2018–2019	Red Bull Brasil	16	(7)
2019–2023	Red Bull Bragantino	112	(40)
2022	→ Bahia (loan)	3	(0)
2023	→ Ferroviária (loan)	5	(1)
2023	→ Sampaio Corrêa (loan)	32	(13)
2024–2025	Remo	37	(9)
2025	ABC	7	(1)
2026–	Joinville	0	(0)
- * Club domestic league appearances and goals as of 00:09, 28 December 2025 (UTC)

Ytalo José Oliveira dos Santos (born 12 January 1988), simply known as Ytalo, is a Brazilian professional footballer who plays as a forward for Campeonato Brasileiro Série D club Joinville.

== Career ==
Born in Maceió, Alagoas, Ytalo started his career at Corinthians Alagoano and played once in 2005 Copa do Brasil. On 1 February 2006 he left for Portuguese side Marítimo and played for its B team at Portuguese Second Division. He made his first team debut on 12 August 2007, substituted Bruno Fogaça at second half, losing to Penafiel in 2007–08 Taça da Liga after penalty shootout. That season he scored once in 2 league appearances. In 2008–09 Primeira Liga, he played 10 league appearances and scored once.

After played the first round of 2009–10 Primeira Liga, he was loaned to Internacional, but mainly played for its B team. In August 2010, his loan was extended for 2 more years. He won 2009 and 2010 Copa FGF with Internacional B. He also played 3 matches and scored once with Internacional at 2010 Campeonato Gaúcho, which Inter finished as runner-up. He went to Portugal for a second spell with Marítimo for the 2012–13 season, returning in March 2013 to sign for Corinthians Alagoano in the final stage of Campeonato Alagoano. In June he signed for Paulista, to compete in the 2013 Copa Paulista, but suffered a cruciate ligament injury, which kept him out until the following season.

Ytalo was signed by Audax in April 2014 and, as part of a partnership agreement, loaned out to Guaratinguetá for the 2014 Campeonato Brasileiro Série C season. He was top scorer in the division, and after returning to Audax for 2015 Campeonato Paulista he was loaned to Athletico Paranaense for the 2015 Campeonato Brasileiro Série A season. After impressing in a 2018 Campeonato Paulista match for Audax against them, Ytalo signed for São Paulo on 20 May 2016.

On 5 June 2016, Ytalo scored his first goal for São Paulo in the 1–0 Campeonato Brasileiro Série A victory against Cruzeiro. He suffered a cruciate ligament injury soon after, and was out for the rest of the season. After recovering from surgery he was loaned back to Audax. At the conclusion of the state league campaign he signed for CRB for their 2017 Campeonato Brasileiro Série B campaign, but in August he moved to Republic of Macedonia side FK Vardar. He returned to Brazil in January 2018, signing with Linense for the 2018 Campeonato Paulista season.

In June 2018 Ytalo signed for Red Bull Brasil initially for the 2018 Copa Paulista, but then extended for 2019 Campeonato Paulista. He became part of the Red Bull Bragantino team when Red Bull Brasil merged with Clube Atlético Bragantino in April 2019.

In August 2022, Bragantino sent Ytalo on loan to Série B side Bahia until the end of the 2022 season. On 2 January 2023, Ytalo was loaned to Ferroviária for the 2023 Campeonato Paulista. In April 2023, Bragantino loaned Ytalo to Série B side Sampaio Corrêa until the end of the 2023 season.

On 1 December 2023, Ytalo's contract with Red Bull Bragantino ended and he joined Série C club Remo ahead of the 2024 season. On 9 June 2025, he joined Série C side ABC. At the end of the 2025 season, Ytalo joined Série D club Joinville.

== Honours ==
Red Bull Bragantino

- Campeonato Brasileiro Série B: 2019

Remo

- Campeonato Paraense: 2025
