= Marco Antônio (footballer, born 1997) =

Brazilian footballer

Personal information
- Full name: Marco Antônio Rosa Furtado Júnior
- Date of birth: 1 October 1997 (age 29)
- Place of birth: Belém, Brazil
- Height: 1.72 m (5 ft 7 1/2 in)
- Position: Midfielder

Team information
- Current team: Inter de Limeira
- Number: 26

Youth career
- 2016: Desportiva Paraense
- 2016–2017: Bahia

Senior career*
Years	Team	Apps	(Gls)
2016–	Bahia	71	(7)
2021	→ Botafogo (loan)	47	(10)
2023	→ Atlético Goianiense (loan)	7	(0)
2023	→ Chapecoense (loan)	19	(2)
2024	→ Remo (loan)	27	(3)
2025	Água Santa	7	(0)
2025	Náutico	7	(0)
2026–	Inter de Limeira	16	(2)
- * Club domestic league appearances and goals as of 9 November 2026

Marco Antônio Rosa Furtado Júnior (born 1 October 1997), known as Marco Antônio, is a Brazilian footballer who plays as a midfielder for Inter de Limeira.

== Career statistics ==
As of 10 March 2023

Club	Season	League			State League		Cup		Continental		Other		Total	
Club	Season	Division	Apps	Goals	Apps	Goals	Apps	Goals	Apps	Goals	Apps	Goals	Apps	Goals
Bahia	2016	Série B	0	0	—		—		—		1 (Note: All appearance(s) in Copa do Nordeste)	0	1	0
Bahia	2017	Série A	0	0	2	0	—		—		—		2	0
Bahia	2018	Série A	10	0	5	0	1	0	2 (Note: All appearance(s) in Copa Sudamericana)	0	3	2	21	2
Bahia	2019	Série A	6	1	2	0	0	0	0	0	0	0	8	1
Bahia	2020	Série A	18	1	6	3	0	0	0	0	3	0	27	4
Bahia	2021	Série A	0	0	0	0	0	0	0	0	2	0	2	0
Bahia	2022	Série B	15	1	7	1	2	0	—		8	3	32	5
Bahia	2023	Série A	0	0	0	0	0	0	—		0	0	0	0
Bahia	Total		49	3	22	4	3	0	2	0	17	5	93	12
Botafogo (loan)	2021	Série B	37	9	10	1	1	0	—		—		48	10
Atlético Goianiense (loan)	2023	Série B	0	0	—		0	0	—		—		0	0
Career total			86	12	32	4	6	0	2	0	17	5	141	21

== Honours ==
Botafogo

- Campeonato Brasileiro Série B: 2021

Bahia

- Campeonato Baiano: 2018, 2019, 2020
