= Ligger =

Brazilian footballer

Personal information
- Full name: Ligger Moreira Malaquias
- Date of birth: 18 May 1988 (age 38)
- Place of birth: Santo Amaro, Brazil
- Height: 1.86 m (6 ft 1 in)
- Position: Centre back

Team information
- Current team: Itabaiana

Youth career
- 2004–2005: Ipitanga
- 2006–2008: Icasa

Senior career*
| Years | Team | Apps | (Gls) |
| 2008–2010 | Icasa | 1 | (0) |
| 2010 | Guarani de Juazeiro | 15 | (2) |
| 2011–2012 | Cianorte | 49 | (4) |
| 2012–2017 | Oeste | 139 | (6) |
| 2014–2015 | → Sheriff Tiraspol (loan) | 8 | (0) |
| 2016–2017 | → Joinville (loan) | 25 | (0) |
| 2017–2018 | Fortaleza | 72 | (2) |
| 2019 | Red Bull Brasil | 14 | (1) |
| 2019–2021 | Bragantino | 76 | (0) |
| 2021–2022 | Bahia | 3 | (0) |
| 2022 | São Bernardo | 9 | (0) |
| 2022–2023 | Novorizontino | 52 | (1) |
| 2024 | Remo | 26 | (2) |
| 2025 | Figueirense | 28 | (2) |
| 2026 | Primavera | 8 | (2) |
| 2026– | Itabaiana | 17 | (0) |
- * Club domestic league appearances and goals as of 11 November 2026

Ligger Moreira Malaquias (born 18 May 1988), simply known as Ligger, is a Brazilian football player who plays as a central defender for Itabaiana.

== Club career ==
Ligger started his career with Guarani de Juazeiro before representing Cianorte in 2011 Campeonato Brasileiro Série D and 2012 Campeonato Brasileiro Série D. He signed for Oeste after the 2012 Série D campaign, and played the last ten game of the title-winning 2012 Campeonato Brasileiro Série C season. He signed a five-year contract extension with Oeste in May 2013.

On 24 June 2014, Ligger was loaned to Moldovan side Sheriff Tiraspol on a six-month deal with the option of making the move permanent. He returned to Oeste for the 2015 season, and was loaned to Joinville for the 2016 Campeonato Brasileiro Série B season, where he was a regular starter, and one of the main players or the team.

In December 2016 Ligger signed for Fortaleza for the 2017 season. He was a regular starter as the team finished runner-up in 2017 Campeonato Brasileiro Série C and gained promotion, and a regular player the following season as the team were champions of 2018 Campeonato Brasileiro Série B.

Ligger signed for Red Bull Brasil in January 2019, and transitioned to the new Red Bull Bragantino when the merger with Clube Atlético Bragantino took place.

== Career statistics ==
As of 24 October 2021.

Appearances and goals by club, season and competition
| Club | Season | League | | | State League | | Cup | | Continental | | Other | | Total | |
| Club | Season | Division | Apps | Goals | Apps | Goals | Apps | Goals | Apps | Goals | Apps | Goals | Apps | Goals |
|---|---|---|---|---|---|---|---|---|---|---|---|---|---|---|
| Icasa | 2008 | Série C | 0 | 0 | 1 | 0 | 2 | 0 | — | | — | | 3 | 0 |
| Icasa | 2009 | Série C | 0 | 0 | 0 | 0 | 3 | 0 | — | | — | | 3 | 0 |
| Icasa | Total | | 0 | 0 | 1 | 0 | 5 | 0 | — | | — | | 6 | 0 |
| Guarani de Juazeiro | 2010 | Cearense | — | | 15 | 2 | — | | — | | 3 (Note: Appearance(s) in Copa Fares Lopes) | 0 | 18 | 2 |
| Cianorte | 2011 | Série D | 4 | 0 | 11 | 0 | — | | — | | — | | 15 | 0 |
| Cianorte | 2012 | Série D | 11 (Note: Note: Soccerway shows only one appearance in the summary table, but clicking through shows 11.) | 0 | 23 | 4 | — | | — | | — | | 34 | 4 |
| Cianorte | Total | | 15 | 0 | 34 | 4 | — | | — | | — | | 49 | 4 |
| Oeste | 2012 | Série C | 10 | 0 | — | | — | | — | | — | | 10 | 0 |
| Oeste | 2013 | Série B | 32 | 0 | 19 | 2 | — | | — | | — | | 51 | 2 |
| Oeste | 2014 | Série B | 7 | 1 | 14 | 1 | — | | — | | — | | 21 | 2 |
| Oeste | 2015 | Série B | 33 | 1 | 18 | 1 | — | | — | | — | | 51 | 2 |
| Oeste | 2016 | Série B | 1 | 0 | 5 | 0 | — | | — | | — | | 6 | 0 |
| Oeste | Total | | 83 | 2 | 56 | 4 | — | | — | | — | | 139 | 6 |
| Sheriff (loan) | 2014–15 | Moldovan National Division | 8 | 0 | — | | 1 | 0 | 4 (Note: Two appearances in UEFA Champions League, two appearances in UEFA Europa League) | 0 | 1 (Note: Appearance(s) in Moldovan Super Cup) | 0 | 14 | 0 |
| Joinville (loan) | 2016 | Série B | 25 | 0 | — | | — | | — | | — | | 25 | 0 |
| Fortaleza | 2017 | Série C | 21 | 0 | 9 | 0 | 1 | 0 | — | | 5 (Note: Appearance(s) in Copa do Nordeste) | 0 | 36 | 0 |
| Fortaleza | 2018 | Série B | 30 | 2 | 12 | 0 | — | | — | | — | | 42 | 2 |
| Fortaleza | Total | | 51 | 2 | 21 | 0 | 1 | 0 | — | | 5 | 0 | 78 | 2 |
| Red Bull Brasil | 2019 | Paulista | — | | 14 | 1 | — | | — | | — | | 14 | 1 |
| Bragantino | 2019 | Série B | 30 | 0 | — | | — | | — | | — | | 30 | 0 |
| Bragantino | 2020 | Série A | 29 | 0 | 11 | 0 | 2 | 0 | — | | — | | 42 | 0 |
| Bragantino | 2021 | Série A | 1 | 0 | 5 | 0 | 0 | 0 | 2 (Note: Appearance(s) in Copa Sudamericana) | 0 | — | | 8 | 0 |
| Bragantino | Total | | 60 | 0 | 16 | 0 | 2 | 0 | 2 | 0 | — | | 80 | 0 |
| Bahia | 2021 | Série A | 3 | 0 | — | | 0 | 0 | — | | — | | 3 | 0 |
| Career Total | | | 245 | 4 | 157 | 11 | 9 | 0 | 6 | 0 | 9 | 0 | 426 | 15 |

== Honours ==
Oeste

- Campeonato Brasileiro Série C: 2012

Sheriff

- Moldovan Super Cup: 2014

Fortaleza

- Campeonato Brasileiro Série B: 2018

Red Bull Bragantino

- Campeonato Brasileiro Série B: 2019
