= Ruan Ribeiro =

Brazilian footballer

Personal information
- Full name: Ruan Ribeiro Rodrigues
- Date of birth: 15 August 2003 (age 23)
- Place of birth: Imperatriz, Brazil
- Height: 1.79 m (5 ft 10 in)
- Position: Forward

Team information
- Current team: Port
- Number: 9

Youth career
- 2017–2023: Palmeiras
- 2022: → Ibrachina (loan)

Senior career*
Years	Team	Apps	(Gls)
2023–2025	Palmeiras	0	(0)
2023	→ Valmiera (loan)	31	(6)
2024	→ Paysandu (loan)	22	(2)
2025	→ Inter de Limeira (loan)	7	(2)
2025–2026	Vila Nova	19	(0)
2026–	Port	0	(0)
- * Club domestic league appearances and goals as of 17 December 2025

Ruan Ribeiro Rodrigues (born 15 August 2003), known as Ruan Ribeiro, is a Brazilian footballer who plays as a forward for Thai League 1 club Port.

== Career ==
Formed in the Palmeiras youth categories, Ribeiro stood out as a highlight of winning the 2023 Copa São Paulo de Futebol Jr. alongside Kevin, being the top scorer of the competition. Without space in the main squad, which still aimed to improve of Endrick instead Ribeiro, ended up loaned to Valmiera FC in Latvian football.

For 2024 season, a new loan was agreed, with Paysandu SC, until the end of Série B.

At the end of 2024, Ruan joined Inter de Limeira on loan to compete in the 2025 edition of the Campeonato Paulista, where he made eight appearances and scored two goals. In March 2025, he was once again loaned out by Palmeiras, this time to Vila Nova, for the Campeonato Brasileiro Série B.

== Career statistics ==
As of 24 May 2024

Appearances and goals by club, season and competition
Club	Season	League			Cup		Continental		Other		Total	
Club	Season	Division	Apps	Goals	Apps	Goals	Apps	Goals	Apps	Goals	Apps	Goals
Valmiera	2023	Virslīga	20	4	2	—	—		—		22	4
Paysandu	2024	Série B	4	0	0	—	—		—		4	0
Career total			24	4	2	0	0	0	0	0	22	4

== Honours ==
Palmeiras

- Copa São Paulo de Futebol Jr.: 2023

Paysandu

- Campeonato Paraense: 2024
- Copa Verde: 2024

Individual

- 2023 Copa São Paulo top scorer: 9 goals
