= Matheus Anjos =

Brazilian footballer

Personal information
- Full name: Matheus Aleksander dos Anjos
- Date of birth: 21 December 1998 (age 27)
- Place of birth: Campinas, Brazil
- Height: 1.81 m (5 ft 11 in)
- Position: Midfielder

Team information
- Current team: Primavera

Youth career
- –2017: Athletico Paranaense

Senior career*
Years	Team	Apps	(Gls)
2017–	Athletico Paranaense	43	(7)
2018	→ Guarani (loan)	5	(0)
2019	→ Paraná (loan)	17	(2)
2020–2021	→ Botafogo-SP (loan)	38	(2)
2021–2022	→ Ponte Preta	19	(0)
2023	ABC	34	(5)
2024	Clube do Remo	18	(0)
2025–	Primavera	25	(1)
2025	→ Capital CF (loan)	6	(2)
2026	→ Caxias (loan)	6	(5)
- * Club domestic league appearances and goals as of 10 November 2026

Matheus Aleksander dos Anjos (born 21 December 1998), known as Matheus Anjos, is a Brazilian professional soccer player who plays as a midfielder for Primavera.

== Honours ==
Athletico Paranaense

- Campeonato Paranaense: 2018, 2019
