= 2023 Ceará Sporting Club season =

Ceará
2023 season
- President: Robinson de Castro (until 9 February); Carlos Moraes (second vice president, from 9 February until 29 March); João Paulo Silva (from 29 March)
- Head coach: Vagner Mancini
- Stadium: Castelão; Presidente Vargas
- Série B: 11th
- Campeonato Cearense: Runners-up
- Copa do Brasil: Second round
- Copa do Nordeste: Champions
Home colors	Away colors
- All statistics correct as of February 2023.

The 2023 season is the 109th season in the existence of Ceará Sporting Club and the club's first season back in the Série B since 2016, following its relegation from the Série A last season. In addition to the Série B, Ceará are also participating in this season's editions of the Copa do Brasil, Copa do Nordeste and Campeonato Cearense.

On 9 February, the resignation of president Robinson de Castro was announced. The then second vice president, Carlos Moraes, temporarily assumes the executive presidency of the club. On the same day, José Barreto de Carvalho Filho was elected president of the club's deliberative council until 2026.

== Players ==
=== First-team squad ===
As of 16 December 2022

Note: Flags indicate national team as defined under FIFA eligibility rules; some limited exceptions apply. Players may hold more than one non-FIFA nationality.

No.	Pos.	Nation	Player
7	MF	BRA	Richardson
11	FW	BRA	Erick
13	DF	BRA	Luiz Otávio
14	DF	BRA	Lucas Ribeiro
15	DF	BRA	Gabriel Lacerda
21	MF	BRA	Geovane
23	MF	BRA	David Ricardo
27	DF	BRA	Buiú
29	MF	BRA	Vina
40	MF	BRA	Guilherme Castilho
67	GK	BRA	André Luiz
70	DF	BRA	Kelvyn
80	MF	BRA	Léo Rafael
88	DF	BRA	Michel Macedo
89	FW	BRA	Cléber (banned by drug test)
91	GK	BRA	Richard

No.	Pos.	Nation	Player
–	MF	BRA	Arthur Rezende
–	MF	BRA	Caíque Gonçalves
–	DF	BRA	Igor
–	MF	BRA	Jean Carlos
–	FW	BRA	Leandro Carvalho
–	DF	BRA	Tiago Pagnussat
–	DF	BRA	Willian Formiga
–	DF	BRA	Danilo Barcelos
–	FW	MDA	Luvannor

=== Academy ===
Note: Flags indicate national team as defined under FIFA eligibility rules; some limited exceptions apply. Players may hold more than one non-FIFA nationality.

No.	Pos.	Nation	Player
5	MF	BRA	Wendell
18	MF	BRA	David
32	FW	BRA	Caio Rafael

No.	Pos.	Nation	Player
–	GK	BRA	Cristian
–	DF	BRA	Jefferson
–	DF	BRA	Vitão

=== Out on loan ===
Note: Flags indicate national team as defined under FIFA eligibility rules; some limited exceptions apply. Players may hold more than one non-FIFA nationality.

No.	Pos.	Nation	Player
—	FW	BRA	Zé Roberto (on loan at Mirassol until the end of season)

== Transfers ==
Source:ge and others

=== In ===
Date	Pos.	Player	From/Last club	Type	Ref.
22 November 2022	HC	(Paraguay) Gustavo Morínigo	Free agent	Free transfer	
2 December 2022	DF	(Brazil) Tiago Pagnussat	(Japan) Cerezo Osaka (Note: The player belonged to Cerezo Osaka and was loaned to Nagoya Grampus last season.)	Free transfer	
6 December 2022	MF	(Brazil) Arthur Rezende	(Brazil) Vila Nova	Free transfer	
8 December 2022	MF	(Brazil) Caíque Gonçalves	(Brazil) Ituano	Free transfer	
10 December 2022	MF	(Brazil) Jean Carlos	(Brazil) Náutico	Transfer	
16 December 2022	DF	(Brazil) Willian Formiga	(Brazil) Vila Nova	Free transfer	
17 December 2022	DF	(Brazil) Danilo Barcelos	(Brazil) Fluminense (Note: The player belonged to Fluminense and was loaned to Goiás last season.)	Free transfer	
30 December 2022	FW	(Moldova) Luvannor	(Brazil) Cruzeiro	Free transfer	
2 January 2023	MF	(Brazil) Chay	(Brazil) Botafogo	Loan	
2 January 2023	GK	(Paraguay) Alfredo Aguilar	(Paraguay) Olimpia	Free transfer	
4 January 2023	FW	(Brazil) Janderson	(Brazil) Corinthians (Note: The player belonged to Corinthians and was loaned to Grêmio last season.)	Free transfer	
6 January 2023	FW	(Brazil) Vitor Gabriel	(Brazil) Flamengo	Loan	
3 February 2023	FW	(Brazil) Hygor	(Brazil) Ferroviária (Note: The player belonged to Ferroviária and was loaned to Criciúma last season.)	Free transfer	
6 February 2023	DF	(Brazil) Warley	(Brazil) Coritiba	Loan	
10 February 2023	MF	(Brazil) Willian Maranhão	(Brazil) Santos	Loan	

=== Loans return ===
Date	Pos.	Player	Returned from	Ref.
25 November 2022	DF	(Brazil) Igor	(Brazil) CSA	
16 December 2022	FW	(Brazil) Leandro Carvalho	(Brazil) Remo	

=== Out ===
Date	Pos.	Player	Transferred to	Type	Ref.
14 November 2022	FW	(Brazil) Matheus Peixoto	(Ukraine) Metalist Kharkiv	End of loan	
24 November 2022	DF	(Brazil) Nino Paraíba	(Brazil) América Mineiro	Free transfer	
1 December 2022	MF	(Brazil) Fernando Sobral	(Brazil) Cuiabá	Transfer	
7 December 2022	DF	(Brazil) Messias	(Brazil) Santos	Transfer	
8 December 2022	FW	(Colombia) Mendoza	(Brazil) Santos	Transfer	
12 December 2022	MF	(Brazil) Diego Rigonato	Free agent	Free transfer	
15 December 2022	DF	(Brazil) Marcos Victor	(Brazil) Bahia (Note: sold to City Football Group.)	Transfer	
16 December 2022	DF	(Brazil) Bruno Pacheco	(Brazil) Fortaleza	Transfer	
17 December 2022	FW	(Brazil) Zé Roberto	(Brazil) Mirassol	Loan	
19 December 2022	GK	(Brazil) João Ricardo	Fortaleza (Note: João Ricardo transferred to Fortaleza after his release.)	Free transfer	
19 December 2022	FW	(Colombia) Jhon Vásquez	(Colombia) Deportivo Cali	End of loan	
20 December 2022	MF	(Brazil) Lima	(Brazil) Fluminense	Transfer	

== Pre-season training game ==
7 January 2023 Training game	Ceará	4–1	Atlético Cearense	Itaitinga
09:00 UTC−3	Vina; Luiz Otávio; Jean Carlos; Gabriel Lacerda	Report	Lucas Maranguape	Stadium: Cidade Vozão; Attendance: 0
Note: It was played behind closed doors.

== Campeonato Cearense ==
=== First stage ===
15 January 2023 1	Guarani de Juazeiro	0–5	Ceará	Juazeiro do Norte
17:00 UTC−3		Report; Financial report	Tiago Pagnussat 3'; Vitor Gabriel 48'; Luiz Otávio 56'; Jean Carlos 62' (pen.); Guilherme Castilho 87' (pen.)	Stadium: Romeirão; Attendance: 3,899; Referee: Marcelo de Lima Henrique

25 January 2023 2	Ceará	4–0	Pacajus	Fortaleza
20:00 UTC−3	Vitor Gabriel 8'; Guilherme Castilho 14'; Erick 67'; Luvannor 76'	Report; Financial report		Stadium: Presidente Vargas; Attendance: 3,451; Referee: Luiz César Magalhães

28 January 2023 3	Ceará	2–1	Maracanã	Fortaleza
16:00 UTC−3	Janderson 80'; Jean Carlos 82'	Report; Financial report	Hudson 57'	Stadium: Presidente Vargas; Attendance: 4,999; Referee: Léo Simão Holanda

31 January 2023 4	Ferroviário	1–1	Ceará	Fortaleza
20:00 UTC−3	Lincoln 36'	Report	David Ricardo 5'	Stadium: Presidente Vargas; Referee: Rodrigues Júnior

7 February 2023 5	Ceará	2–1	Fortaleza	Fortaleza
21:35 UTC−3	Guilherme Castilho 9' (pen.); Erick 11'	Report	Thiago Galhardo 48'	Stadium: Presidente Vargas; Referee: Ramon Abatti Abel

=== Semi-finals ===
12 March 2023	Iguatu	1–1	Ceará	Iguatu
09:00 (UTC-3)	Léo Reis 36'	Report	Guilherme Castilho 6'	Stadium: Estádio Antônio Moreno de Melo; Referee: Adriano Barros Carneiro

18 March 2023	Ceará	2–0	Iguatu	Fortaleza
16:00 (UTC-3)	Vitor Gabriel 9'; Léo Rafael 90+1'	Report		Stadium: Castelão; Referee: Leo Simão Holanda

=== Finals ===
1 April 2023	Fortaleza	2–1	Ceará	Fortaleza
16:00 (UTC-3)	Eduardo Sasha 23'; Caio Alexandre 48'	Report	Danilo Barcelos 90+7' (pen.)	Stadium: Castelão; Referee: Wilton Pereira Sampaio

8 April 2023	Ceará	2–2	Fortaleza	Fortaleza
16:00 (UTC-3)	Erick 9'; Janderson 35'	Report	Lucero 45+2' (pen.); Calebe 87'	Stadium: Castelão; Referee: Wagner Magalhães

==== Record ====
Final Position	Points	Matches	Wins	Draws	Losses	Goals For	Goals Away	Avg%
2nd	18	9	5	3	1	20	8	66%

== Copa do Nordeste ==
=== Group stage ===
22 January 2023 1	Ferroviário	3–0	Ceará	Fortaleza
18:00 UTC−3	Ciel 21' (pen.), 57'; Erick Pulga 44'	Report; Financial report		Stadium: Presidente Vargas; Attendance: 7,882; Referee: Antonio Dib Moraes de Sousa

4 February 2023 2	Ceará	2–0	Sampaio Corrêa	Fortaleza
17:30 UTC−3	Jean Carlos 35'; Guilherme Castilho 70'	Report		Stadium: Presidente Vargas; Attendance: 7,766; Referee: Denis da Silva Ribeiro Serafim

14 February 2023 3	Ceará	3–2	Sport	Fortaleza
21:30 UTC−3	Willian Formiga 6'; David Ricardo 45+2'; Janderson 56'	Report	Luciano Juba 18'; Vagner Love 80'	Stadium: Presidente Vargas; Attendance: 13,376; Referee: Diego Pombo Lopez

18 February 2023 4	CRB	1–1	Ceará	Maceió
19:00 UTC−3	Anselmo Ramon 73'	Report	Erick 86'	Stadium: Rei Pelé; Attendance: 4,979; Referee: Rodrigo Jose Pereira de Lima

22 February 2023 5	Fluminense-PI	2–5	Ceará	Teresina
21:30 UTC−3	Carlinhos 50'; Gabriel 77'	Report	Arthur Rezende 7'; Vitor Gabriel 20'; Guilherme Castilho 38'; Erick 73'; Jean Carlos 86'	Stadium: Lindolfo Monteiro; Attendance: 239; Referee: José Ricardo Vasconcellos Laranjeira

5 March 2023 6	Ceará	2–0	Fortaleza	Fortaleza
18:30 UTC−3	Guilherme Castilho 10'; Erick 23'	Report		Stadium: Castelão; Attendance: 36,567; Referee: Diego Pombo Lopez

8 March 2023 7	Vitória	2–0	Ceará	Salvador
21:30 UTC−3	Tréllez 22'; Torres 40'	Report		Stadium: Barradão; Attendance: 1,899; Referee: José Ricardo Vasconcellos Laranjeira

22 March 2023 8	Ceará	3–1	Atlético de Alagoinhas	Fortaleza
21:30 UTC−3	Álvaro 44'; Vitor Gabriel 87'; Janderson 90+4'	Report	Athirson 50'	Stadium: Presidente Vargas; Attendance: 6,284; Referee: Tiago Ramos de Oliveira

=== Quarter-final ===
26 March 2023	Ceará	3–1	Sergipe	Fortaleza
18:00 (UTC-3)	Erick 16'; Álvaro 45+2'; Luvannor 90+3'	Report	Pedro Henrique 39'	Stadium: Castelão; Attendance: 18,399; Referee: Caio Max Augusto Vieira

=== Semi-final ===
29 March 2023	Fortaleza	2–3	Ceará	Fortaleza
21:30 (UTC-3)	Calebe 30'; Lucero 64'	Report	Erick 12'; Caíque 34'; Titi 46' (o.g.)	Stadium: Castelão; Attendance: 31,929; Referee: Marcelo de Lima Henrique

=== Finals ===
19 April 2023	Ceará	2–1	Sport	Fortaleza
21:30 (UTC-3)	Guilherme Castilho 1'; Vitor Gabriel 45+1'	Report	David Ricardo 90+8' (o.g.)	Stadium: Castelão; Attendance: 59,889; Referee: Caio Max Augusto Vieira

3 May 2023	Sport	1–0 (2–4 p)	Ceará	Recife
21:00 (UTC-3)	Luciano Juba 26'	Report		Stadium: Ilha do Retiro; Attendance: 26,345; Referee: Denis da Silva Ribeiro Serafim
	Penalties
	Luciano Juba (penalty missed); Vágner Love (penalty scored); Sabino (penalty scored); Gabriel Santos (penalty missed)		(penalty scored) Danilo Barcelos; (penalty scored) Jean Carlos; (penalty missed) Guilherme Castilho; (penalty scored) Luvannor; (penalty scored) Erick

==== Record ====
Final Position	Points	Matches	Wins	Draws	Losses	Goals For	Goals Away	Avg%
1st	25	12	8	1	3	24	16	69%

== Copa do Brasil ==
=== First round ===
1 March 2023 First round	Caldense	0–3	Ceará	Poços de Caldas
21:30 UTC−3		Report	Janderson 28'; Vitor Gabriel 46'; Luvannor 86'	Stadium: Ronaldão; Attendance: 1,392; Referee: Dyorgines Jose Padovani de Andrade

=== Second round ===
15 March 2023	Ituano	1–1 (4–2 p)	Ceará	Itu
19:00 (UTC-3)	Diego Quirino 44'	Report	Guilherme Castilho 16'	Stadium: Novelli Júnior; Attendance: 2,072; Referee: Leandro Pedro Vuaden
	Penalties
	Jefferson Paulino (penalty scored); Rafael Silva (penalty scored); José Aldo (penalty scored); Rafael Pereira (penalty scored)		(penalty missed) Jean Carlos; (penalty scored) Arthur Rezende; (penalty scored) Luvannor; (penalty missed) Janderson

==== Record ====
Final Position	Points	Matches	Wins	Draws	Losses	Goals For	Goals Away	Avg%
34th	4	2	1	1	0	4	1	66%

== Série B ==
Pos	Team	Pld	W	D	L	GF	GA	GD	Pts
9	CRB	38	16	9	13	45	39	+6	57
10	Guarani	38	15	12	11	42	33	+9	57
11	Ceará	38	13	11	14	40	45	−5	50
12	Botafogo-SP	38	12	11	15	25	42	−17	47
13	Avaí	38	10	14	14	31	48	−17	44

Source: CBF
Rules for classification: 1) points; 2) wins; 3) goal difference; 4) goals scored; 5) head-to-head results (only between 2 teams); 6) fewest red cards; 7) fewest yellow cards; 8) drawing of lots.

=== Matches ===
14 April 2023 1	Ituano	2–0	Ceará	Itu
21:30 (UTC-3)	Hygor 39' (o.g.); Bruno Xavier 90+7'	Report		Stadium: Novelli Júnior; Attendance: 1,151; Referee: Bruno Arleu de Araujo

22 April 2023 2	Ceará	0–3	Guarani	Fortaleza
18:15 (UTC-3)		Report	Isaque 11'; Bruno Mendes 25'; Derek 90+5'	Stadium: Presidente Vargas; Attendance: 0 Referee: Yuri Elino Ferreira da Cruz

30 April 2023 3	ABC	1–2	Ceará	Natal
18:00 (UTC-3)	Matheus Anjos 33' (pen.)	Report	Vitor Gabriel 6', 42'	Stadium: Frasqueirão; Attendance: 7,253; Referee: Felipe Fernandes de Lima

7 May 2023 4	Ponte Preta	0–0	Ceará	Campinas
11:00 (UTC-3)		Report		Stadium: Moisés Lucarelli; Attendance: 5,553; Referee: Rafael Rodrigo Klein

10 May 2023 5	Ceará	0–2	Vitória	Fortaleza
19:00 (UTC-3)		Report	José Hugo 49'; Wagner Leonardo 62'	Stadium: Presidente Vargas; Attendance: 0 Referee: Bruno Mota Correia

13 May 2023 6	Ceará	2–0	Tombense	Fortaleza
18:15 (UTC-3)	Erick 20'; Nicolas 77'	Report		Stadium: Presidente Vargas; Attendance: 0 Referee: Leonardo Ferreira Lima

21 May 2023 7	Criciúma	1–2	Ceará	Criciúma
15:30 (UTC-3)	Marquinhos Gabriel 32' (pen.)	Report	Nicolas 3'; Erick 44'	Stadium: Heriberto Hülse; Attendance: 16,073; Referee: Wilton Pereira Sampaio

24 May 2023 8	Londrina	1–3	Ceará	Londrina
19:00 (UTC-3)	Udeh 90+4'	Report	Willian Maranhão 2'; Erick 17'; Jean Carlos 36'	Stadium: Estádio do Café; Attendance: 1,351; Referee: Maguielson Lima Barbosa

28 May 2023 9	Ceará	0–3	Novorizontino	Fortaleza
15:30 (UTC-3)		Report	Marlon 39'; Geovane 54'; Leonardo 74'	Stadium: Castelão; Attendance: 37,545; Referee: André Luiz Skettino Policarpo Bento

2 June 2023 10	Ceará	2–0	Chapecoense	Fortaleza
19:00 (UTC-3)	Jean Carlos 30'; Vitor Gabriel 90+13'	Report		Stadium: Castelão; Attendance: 41,153; Referee: Paulo Henrique de Melo Salmazio

6 June 2023 11	Atlético Goianiense	0–3	Ceará	Goiânia
21:30 (UTC-3)		Report	Vitor Gabriel 14'; Erick 46'; Guilherme Castilho 84'	Stadium: Estádio Antônio Accioly; Attendance: 2,862; Referee: Matheus Delgado Candançan

10 June 2023 12	Ceará	1–3	CRB	Fortaleza
19:30 (UTC-3)	Chay 38'	Report	Renato 32', 58'; Rômulo 90+5'	Stadium: Castelão; Attendance: 35,898; Referee: Luiz Flavio de Oliveira

25 June 2023 13	Sampaio Corrêa	1–1	Ceará	São Luís
15:30 (UTC-3)	Ytalo 15'	Report	Erick 40'	Stadium: Castelão; Attendance: 5,716; Referee: Thiago Luis Scarascati

28 June 2023 14	Ceará	0–0	Avaí	Fortaleza
19:00 (UTC-3)		Report		Stadium: Castelão; Attendance: 14,513; Referee: Douglas Marques das Flores

2 July 2023 15	Sport	2–0	Ceará	Recife
18:00 (UTC-3)	Ronaldo Henrique 30' (pen.); Luciano Juba 45+5'	Report		Stadium: Ilha do Retiro; Attendance: 17,713; Referee: Bruno Arleu de Araújo

7 July 2023 16	Ceará	3–0	Botafogo–SP	Fortaleza
21:30 (UTC-3)	Nicolas 31'; Léo Santos 79'; David Ricardo 90+2'	Report		Stadium: Castelão; Attendance: 19,428; Referee: Arthur Gomes Rabelo

16 July 2023 17	Mirassol	1–1	Ceará	Mirassol
15:30 (UTC-3)	Chico 45+7'	Report	Erick 44' (pen.)	Stadium: Estádio José Maria de Campos Maia; Attendance: 2,513; Referee: Alisson Sidnei Furtado

19 July 2023 18	Ceará	1–0	Vila Nova	Fortaleza
21:30 (UTC-3)	Luiz Otávio 90+1'	Report		Stadium: Castelão; Attendance: 20,940; Referee: Wagner do Nascimento Magalhães

23 July 2023 19	Juventude	1–0	Ceará	Caxias do Sul
16:00 (UTC-3)	Rodrigo Rodrigues 90+5' (pen.)	Report		Stadium: Estádio Alfredo Jaconi; Attendance: 4,103; Referee: Denis da Silva Ribeiro Serafim

28 July 2023 20	Ceará	1–1	Ituano	Fortaleza
19:00 (UTC-3)	Erick 45+2'	Report	Wesley Pombo 80'	Stadium: Castelão; Attendance: 21,198; Referee: Arthur Gomes Rabelo

2 August 2023 21	Guarani	0–0	Ceará	Campinas
21:30 (UTC-3)		Report		Stadium: Estádio Brinco de Ouro da Princesa; Attendance: 10,443; Referee: Dyorgines José Padovani de Andrade

6 August 2023 22	Ceará	1–0	ABC	Fortaleza
18:00 (UTC-3)	Saulo Mineiro 4'	Report		Stadium: Castelão; Attendance: 20,509; Referee: José Mendonça da Silva Junior

13 August 2023 23	Vitória	1–0	Ceará	Salvador
18:00 (UTC-3)	Léo Gamalho 12'	Report		Stadium: Barradão; Attendance: 22,987; Referee: Bruno Arleu de Araujo

20 August 2023 24	Ceará	1–1	Ponte Preta	Fortaleza
18:00 (UTC-3)	Chrystian Barletta 46'	Report	Eliel 69'	Stadium: Castelão; Attendance: 19,769; Referee: Anderson Daronco

26 August 2023 25	Tombense	2–2	Ceará	Muriaé
17:00 (UTC-3)	Kleiton 83'; Marcelinho 90+5'	Report	Erick 2'; Chrystian Barletta 9'	Stadium: Estádio Soares de Azevedo; Attendance: 444; Referee: Yuri Elino Ferreira da Cruz

2 September 2023 26	Ceará	1–0	Criciúma	Fortaleza
17:00 (UTC-3)	Chrystian Barletta 6'	Report		Stadium: Castelão; Attendance: 22,452; Referee: José Mendonça da Silva Junior

6 September 2023 27	Ceará	3–1	Londrina	Fortaleza
21:30 (UTC-3)	Erick 5'; Tiago Pagnussat 29'; Léo Santos 39'	Report	João Paulo 23'	Stadium: Presidente Vargas; Attendance: 17,799; Referee: Bruno Mota Correia

18 September 2023 28	Novorizontino	4–1	Ceará	Novo Horizonte
21:00 (UTC-3)	César Martins 8'; Aylon 40'; Geovane 45+3'; Tiago Pagnussat 79' (o.g.)	Report	Erick 90+1'	Stadium: Doutor Jorge Ismael de Biasi; Attendance: 2,262; Referee: Paulo Cesar Zanovelli da Silva

23 September 2023 29	Chapecoense	1–1	Ceará	Chapecó
17:00 (UTC-3)	Giovanni 36'	Report	Rodrigo Freitas 90+8' (o.g.)	Stadium: Arena Condá; Attendance: 4,948; Referee: Leandro Pedro Vuaden

1 October 2023 30	Ceará	0–1	Atlético Goianiense	Fortaleza
18:00 (UTC-3)		Report	Luiz Fernando 68'	Stadium: Castelão; Attendance: 11,145; Referee: Luiz Flavio de Oliveira

6 October 2023 31	CRB	2–0	Ceará	Maceió
21:30 (UTC-3)	Anderson Leite 32'; Léo Pereira 49'	Report		Stadium: Rei Pelé; Attendance: 4,780; Referee: Leonardo Ferreira Lima

14 October 2023 32	Ceará	0–0	Sampaio Corrêa	Fortaleza
18:30 (UTC-3)		Report		Stadium: Castelão; Attendance: 6,386; Referee: Rafael Martins Diniz

22 October 2023 33	Avaí	1–0	Ceará	Florianópolis
18:00 (UTC-3)	Waguininho 47'	Report		Stadium: Estádio Aderbal Ramos da Silva (Ressacada); Attendance: 8,520; Referee: Jonathan Benkenstein Pinheiro

27 October 2023 34	Ceará	2–1	Sport	Fortaleza
19:00 (UTC-3)	Chay 10'; Jean Carlos 69'	Report	Jorginho 16'	Stadium: Castelão; Attendance: 6,430; Referee: Yuri Elino Ferreira da Cruz

4 November 2023 35	Botafogo–SP	2–2	Ceará	Ribeirão Preto
17:00 (UTC-3)	Carlos Manuel 9'; Diogo Silva 78'	Report	Guilherme Bissoli 44'; Janderson 68'	Stadium: Estádio Santa Cruz; Attendance: 1,448; Referee: Paulo Belence Alves dos Prazeres Filho

12 November 2023 36	Ceará	2–0	Mirassol	Fortaleza
15:45 (UTC-3)	Erick Pulga 61'; Guilherme Bissoli 69' (pen.)	Report		Stadium: Presidente Vargas; Attendance: 6,194; Referee: Felipe Fernandes de Lima

18 November 2023 37	Vila Nova	3–1	Ceará	Goiânia
17:00 (UTC-3)	Igor Henrique 3'; Juan Coelho 54'; Caio Dantas 56'	Report	Guilherme Bissoli 40'	Stadium: Onésio Brasileiro Alvarenga; Attendance: 10,000; Referee: José Mendonça da Silva Junior

25 November 2023 38	Ceará	1–3	Juventude	Fortaleza
17:00 (UTC-3)	Janderson 16'	Report	Erick 41'; Jadson 78'; Ruan 83'	Stadium: Presidente Vargas; Attendance: 7,555; Referee: Caio Max Augusto Vieira

==== Record ====
Final Position	Points	Matches	Wins	Draws	Losses	Goals For	Goals Away	Avg%
11th	50	38	13	11	14	40	45	43%

== Statistics ==
=== Appearances and goals ===
Numbers after plus-sign (+) denote appearances as a substitute.

As of February 2023

No.	Pos	Nat	Player	Total		Série B		Cearense		Copa do Brasil		Copa do Nordeste	
No.	Pos	Nat	Player	Apps	Goals	Apps	Goals	Apps	Goals	Apps	Goals	Apps	Goals
Goalkeepers
1	GK	(Brazil) BRA	Cristian	0	0	0	0	0	0	0	0	0	0
12	GK	(Paraguay) PAR	Alfredo Aguilar	0	0	0	0	0	0	0	0	0	0
67	GK	(Brazil) BRA	André Luiz	0	0	0	0	0	0	0	0	0	0
91	GK	(Brazil) BRA	Richard	0	0	0	0	0	0	0	0	0	0
Defenders
2	DF	(Brazil) BRA	Igor	0	0	0	0	0	0	0	0	0	0
3	DF	(Brazil) BRA	Tiago Pagnussat	0	0	0	0	0	0	0	0	0	0
4	DF	(Brazil) BRA	David Ricardo	0	0	0	0	0	0	0	0	0	0
13	DF	(Brazil) BRA	Luiz Otávio	0	0	0	0	0	0	0	0	0	0
14	DF	(Brazil) BRA	Lucas Ribeiro	0	0	0	0	0	0	0	0	0	0
15	DF	(Brazil) BRA	Gabriel Lacerda	0	0	0	0	0	0	0	0	0	0
22	DF	(Brazil) BRA	Willian Formiga	0	0	0	0	0	0	0	0	0	0
23	DF	(Brazil) BRA	Danilo Barcelos	0	0	0	0	0	0	0	0	0	0
25	DF	(Brazil) BRA	Jefferson	0	0	0	0	0	0	0	0	0	0
27	DF	(Brazil) BRA	Marcos Ytalo	0	0	0	0	0	0	0	0	0	0
88	DF	(Brazil) BRA	Michel Macedo	0	0	0	0	0	0	0	0	0	0
—	DF	(Brazil) BRA	Warley	0	0	0	0	0	0	0	0	0	0
Midfielders
5	MF	(Brazil) BRA	Caíque	0	0	0	0	0	0	0	0	0	0
6	MF	(Brazil) BRA	Richardson	0	0	0	0	0	0	0	0	0	0
8	MF	(Brazil) BRA	Arthur Rezende	0	0	0	0	0	0	0	0	0	0
10	MF	(Brazil) BRA	Jean Carlos	0	0	0	0	0	0	0	0	0	0
14	MF	(Brazil) BRA	Chay	0	0	0	0	0	0	0	0	0	0
18	MF	(Brazil) BRA	David	0	0	0	0	0	0	0	0	0	0
21	MF	(Brazil) BRA	Geovane	0	0	0	0	0	0	0	0	0	0
80	MF	(Brazil) BRA	Léo Rafael	0	0	0	0	0	0	0	0	0	0
99	MF	(Brazil) BRA	Guilherme Castilho	0	0	0	0	0	0	0	0	0	0
–	MF	(Brazil) BRA	Willian Maranhão	0	0	0	0	0	0	0	0	0	0
–	MF	(Brazil) BRA	Pedro Lucas	0	0	0	0	0	0	0	0	0	0
Forwards
7	FW	(Brazil) BRA	Leandro Carvalho	0	0	0	0	0	0	0	0	0	0
11	FW	(Brazil) BRA	Erick	0	0	0	0	0	0	0	0	0	0
30	FW	(Brazil) BRA	Daniel	0	0	0	0	0	0	0	0	0	0
31	FW	(Brazil) BRA	Hygor	0	0	0	0	0	0	0	0	0	0
33	FW	(Brazil) BRA	Caio Rafael	0	0	0	0	0	0	0	0	0	0
63	FW	(Brazil) BRA	Vitor Gabriel	0	0	0	0	0	0	0	0	0	0
77	FW	(Brazil) BRA	Janderson	0	0	0	0	0	0	0	0	0	0
89	FW	(Brazil) BRA	Cléber	0	0	0	0	0	0	0	0	0	0
90	FW	(Moldova) MDA	Luvannor	0	0	0	0	0	0	0	0	0	0
Players who played in the season but left the club:
29	FW	(Brazil) BRA	Vina	0	0	0	0	0	0	0	0	0	0
