= 2023 Campeonato Cearense =

Campeonato Cearense
- Season: 2023
- Dates: 14 January – 8 April
- Champions: Fortaleza
- Relegated: Guarani de Juazeiro; Pacajus
- Copa do Brasil: Ceará; Fortaleza
- Série D: Ferroviário; Iguatu; Maracanã
- Matches played: 47
- Goals scored: 132 (2.81 per match)
- Top goalscorer: Ciel; Zazá (5 goals each)
- All statistics correct as of 8 April 2023.

The 2023 Campeonato Cearense (officially the Campeonato Cearense 1XBET 2023 for sponsorship reasons) was the 109th edition of Ceará's top professional football league organized by FCF. The competition began on 14 January and ended on 8 April 2023. Fortaleza are the defending champions.

== Format ==
In the first stage, the 10 teams were drawn into two groups of five teams each.

Group A	Group B
Iguatu; Barbalha; Caucaia; Ceará; Atlético Cearense	Ferroviário; Fortaleza; Guarani de Juazeiro; Maracanã; Pacajus

Each team will play on a single round-robin tournament against the five clubs from the other group. The winners of each group will advance to the semi-finals, while the runners-up and third place will advance to the quarter-finals.

The bottom two teams of each group will play the relegation stage. The relegation stage will be played on a home-and-away round-robin basis. The bottom two teams will be relegated to 2024 Campeonato Cearense Série B.

In the first stage and the relegation stage, the teams will be ranked according to points (3 points for a win, 1 point for a draw, and 0 points for a loss). If tied on points, the following criteria will be used to determine the ranking: 1. Wins; 2. Goal difference; 3. Goals scored; 4. Fewest red cards; 5. Fewest yellow cards; 6. Draw in the headquarters of the FCF.

Quarter-finals, semi-finals and finals will be played on a home-and-away two-legged basis. If tied on aggregate, the penalty shoot-out will be used to determine the winners. For the finals, the team with best performance in the semi-finals and the first stage will host the second leg.

Champions and runners-up will qualify for the 2024 Copa do Brasil. Top three teams not already qualified for 2024 Série A, Série B or Série C will qualify for 2024 Série D.

== Teams ==
Club	Home City	Manager
Futebol Clube Atlético Cearense	Fortaleza	Michel Lima
Barbalha Futebol Clube	Barbalha	Márcio Allan
Caucaia Esporte Clube	Caucaia	Roberto Carlos
Ceará Sporting Club	Fortaleza	Gustavo Morínigo
Ferroviário Atlético Clube	Fortaleza	Paulinho Kobayashi
Fortaleza Esporte Clube	Fortaleza	Juan Pablo Vojvoda
Guarani Esporte Clube (Guarani de Juazeiro)	Juazeiro do Norte	Ferreira
Associação Desportiva Iguatu	Iguatu	Washington Luiz
Maracanã Esporte Clube	Maracanaú	Júnior Cearense
Pacajus Esporte Clube	Pacajus	Cleiton Cearense

== First stage ==
=== Group A ===
Pos	Team	Pld	W	D	L	GF	GA	GD	Pts	Qualification
1	Ceará	5	4	1	0	14	3	+11	13	Advance to the semi-finals
2	Iguatu	5	3	1	1	10	6	+4	10	Advance to quarter-finals
3	Atlético Cearense	5	2	2	1	5	8	−3	8	Advance to quarter-finals
4	Caucaia	5	2	0	3	8	4	+4	6	Advance to relegation stage
5	Barbalha	5	1	0	4	6	13	−7	3	Advance to relegation stage

Source: FCF
Rules for classification: 1) Points; 2) Wins; 3) Goal difference; 4) Goals scored; 5) Fewest red cards; 6) Fewest yellow cards; 7) Draw.

=== Group B ===
Pos	Team	Pld	W	D	L	GF	GA	GD	Pts	Qualification
1	Fortaleza	5	4	0	1	12	4	+8	12	Advance to the semi-finals
2	Maracanã	5	2	2	1	5	4	+1	8	Advance to quarter-finals
3	Ferroviário	5	2	1	2	8	5	+3	7	Advance to quarter-finals
4	Pacajus	5	1	1	3	6	11	−5	4	Advance to relegation stage
5	Guarani de Juazeiro	5	0	0	5	3	19	−16	0	Advance to relegation stage

Source: FCF
Rules for classification: 1) Points; 2) Wins; 3) Goal difference; 4) Goals scored; 5) Fewest red cards; 6) Fewest yellow cards; 7) Draw.

== Relegation stage ==
=== Standings and Results ===
Pos	Team	Pld	W	D	L	GF	GA	GD	Pts	Relegation	CAU	BAR	PAC	GUA
1	Caucaia	6	3	3	0	7	3	+4	12			2–0	0–0	1–0
2	Barbalha	6	3	0	3	8	7	+1	9		1–2		1–0	0–1
3	Pacajus (R)	6	2	2	2	10	4	+6	8	Relegation to 2024 Série B	1–1	1–2		7–0
4	Guarani de Juazeiro (R)	6	1	1	4	3	14	−11	4	Relegation to 2024 Série B	1–1	1–4	0–1	

Source: FCF
(R) Relegated

== Final stages ==
=== Bracket ===
Quarter-finals
Ferroviário	2	3	5
Maracanã	0	1	1
Atlético Cearense	1	0	1
Iguatu	2	1	3

Semi-finals
Ferroviário	1	0	1
Fortaleza	1	4	5
Iguatu	1	0	1
Ceará	1	2	3

Finals
Fortaleza	2	2	4
Ceará	1	2	3

=== Quarter-finals ===
Team 1	Agg.	Team 2	1st leg	2nd leg
Atlético Cearense	1–3	Iguatu	1–2	0–1
Ferroviário	5–1	Maracanã	2–0	3–1

==== Group C ====
12 February 2023
16:00

Atlético Cearense	1–2	Iguatu
Siloé 32'	Report	Tiaguinho 53' (pen.); Max Oliveira 88'

Estádio Municipal Prefeito Almir Dutra, Maracanaú
Attendance: 119
Referee: Raimundo Rodrigues de Oliveira Júnior

25 February 2023
18:30

Iguatu	1–0	Atlético Cearense
Luís Soares 43'	Report

Estádio Antônio Moreno de Melo, Iguatu
Attendance: 1,229
Referee: Léo Simão Holanda

==== Group D ====
11 February 2023
16:00

Ferroviário	2–0	Maracanã
Alisson 54'; Erick Pulga 65'	Report

Estádio Presidente Vargas, Fortaleza
Attendance: 1,135
Referee: Renato Pinheiro

25 February 2023
16:00

Maracanã	1–3	Ferroviário
Veraldo 87'	Report	Erick Pulga 20', 70'; Roni 90+5' (pen.)

Estádio Municipal Prefeito Almir Dutra, Maracanaú
Attendance: 1,000
Referee: Marcelo de Lima Henrique

=== Semi-finals ===
Team 1	Agg.	Team 2	1st leg	2nd leg
Iguatu	1–3	Ceará	1–1	0–2
Ferroviário	1–5	Fortaleza	1–1	0–4

==== Group E ====
12 March 2023
09h00

Iguatu	1–1	Ceará
Léo Reis 36'	Report	Guilherme Castilho 6'

Estádio Antônio Moreno de Melo, Iguatu
Referee: Adriano Barros Carneiro

18 March 2023
16h00

Ceará	2–0	Iguatu
Vitor Gabriel 9'; Léo Rafael 90+1'	Report

Castelão, Fortaleza
Referee: Leo Simão Holanda

==== Group F ====
12 March 2023
18h30

Ferroviário	1–1	Fortaleza
Felipe Guedes 38'	Report	Lucero 89'

Castelão, Fortaleza
Referee: Marcelo de Lima Henrique

19 March 2023
18h30

Fortaleza	4–0	Ferroviário
Lucero 32'; Caio Alexandre 45+2'; Calebe 47'; Romero 68'	Report	Éder Lima (red card) 30'

Castelão, Fortaleza
Referee: Luiz Cesar de Oliveira Magalhaes

=== Finals ===
Team 1	Agg.	Team 2	1st leg	2nd leg
Fortaleza	4–3	Ceará	2–1	2–2

==== Matches ====
1 April 2023
16:00

Fortaleza	2–1	Ceará
Lucas Sasha 24'; Caio Alexandre 47'	Report	Danilo Barcelos 90+6'

Castelão, Fortaleza
Attendance: 32,698
Referee: Wilton Sampaio (Goiás)

Fortaleza	Ceará

GK	16	(Brazil) Fernando Miguel
DF	2	(Brazil) Tinga (c)
DF	19	(Argentina) Emanuel Brítez
DF	4	(Brazil) Titi
DF	6	(Brazil) Bruno Pacheco
MF	88	(Brazil) Lucas Sasha
MF	8	(Brazil) Caio Alexandre	(yellow card) 24'	(substituted off) 75'
MF	7	(Argentina) Tomás Pochettino		(substituted off) 80'
FW	21	(Brazil) Moisés		(substituted off) 75'
FW	91	(Brazil) Thiago Galhardo	(yellow card) 90+6'
FW	9	(Argentina) Juan Martín Lucero		(substituted off) 85'
Substitutes:
GK	12	(Brazil) Kennedy	(yellow card) 24'
DF	3	(Colombia) Brayan Ceballos
DF	5	(Brazil) Marcelo Benevenuto
DF	20	(Brazil) Dudu
MF	10	(Brazil) Lucas Crispim
MF	17	(Brazil) Zé Welison
MF	22	(Brazil) Yago Pikachu		(substituted in) 80'
MF	27	(Brazil) Calebe		(substituted in) 75'
MF	31	(Brazil) Amorim
MF	35	(Brazil) Hércules		(substituted in) 75'
FW	11	(Brazil) Romarinho	(yellow card) 90+5'	(substituted in) 85'
FW	29	(Brazil) Guilherme
Coach:
(Argentina) Juan Pablo Vojvoda

GK	1	(Brazil) Richard
DF	17	(Brazil) Warley
DF	3	(Brazil) Tiago Pagnussat
DF	4	(Brazil) David Ricardo	(yellow card) 63'
DF	22	(Brazil) Willian Formiga		(substituted off) 81'
MF	6	(Brazil) Richardson (c)	(yellow card) 31'	(substituted off) 63'
MF	8	(Brazil) Arthur Rezende	(yellow card) 90+1'
MF	99	(Brazil) Guilherme Castilho		(substituted off) 63'
FW	11	(Brazil) Erick		(substituted off) 84'
FW	77	(Brazil) Janderson		(substituted off) 63'
FW	63	(Brazil) Vitor Gabriel
Substitutes:
GK	12	(Paraguay) Alfredo Aguilar
DF	13	(Brazil) Luiz Otávio
DF	15	(Brazil) Gabriel Lacerda
DF	23	(Brazil) Danilo Barcelos		(substituted in) 81'
DF	88	(Brazil) Michel Macedo
MF	5	(Brazil) Caíque Gonçalves	(yellow card) 83'	(substituted in) 63'
MF	10	(Brazil) Jean Carlos
MF	14	(Brazil) Chay		(substituted in) 63'
MF	80	(Brazil) Léo Rafael
MF	95	(Brazil) Willian Maranhão
FW	31	(Brazil) Hygor		(substituted in) 84'
FW	90	(Moldova) Luvannor		(substituted in) 63'
Coach:
(Paraguay) Gustavo Morínigo

Assistant referees:
Bruno Raphael Pires (Goiás)
Bruno Boschilia (Paraná)
Fourth official:
Leandro Pedro Vuaden (Rio Grande do Sul)
Fifth official:
Jorge Fernando Teixeira Bandeira Filho
Video assistant referee:
Pablo Ramon Gonçalves Pinheiro (Rio Grande do Norte)
Assistant video assistant referees:
Lucas Paulo Torezin (Paraná)

8 April 2023
16:00

Ceará	2–2	Fortaleza
Erick 8'; Janderson 35'	Report	Lucero 45+1' (pen.); Calebe 87'

Castelão, Fortaleza
Attendance: 56,491
Referee: Wagner do Nascimento Magalhães (Rio de Janeiro)

Ceará	Fortaleza

GK	1	(Brazil) Richard
DF	17	(Brazil) Warley	(yellow card) 90+1'
DF	3	(Brazil) Tiago Pagnussat		(substituted off) 78'
DF	13	(Brazil) Luiz Otávio (c)
DF	22	(Brazil) Willian Formiga		(substituted off) 78'
MF	5	(Brazil) Caíque Gonçalves
MF	8	(Brazil) Arthur Rezende
MF	14	(Brazil) Chay	(yellow card) 14'	(substituted off) 66'
FW	11	(Brazil) Erick
FW	77	(Brazil) Janderson		(substituted off) 70'
FW	63	(Brazil) Vitor Gabriel		(substituted off) 78'
Substitutes:
GK	12	(Paraguay) Alfredo Aguilar
DF	4	(Brazil) David Ricardo
DF	15	(Brazil) Gabriel Lacerda
DF	23	(Brazil) Danilo Barcelos		(substituted in) 78'
DF	88	(Brazil) Michel Macedo
MF	10	(Brazil) Jean Carlos		(substituted in) 66'
MF	80	(Brazil) Léo Rafael
MF	95	(Brazil) Willian Maranhão
MF	99	(Brazil) Guilherme Castilho		(substituted in) 78'
FW	31	(Brazil) Hygor		(substituted in) 78'
FW	90	(Moldova) Luvannor		(substituted in) 70'
Coach:
(Paraguay) Gustavo Morínigo

GK	16	(Brazil) Fernando Miguel
DF	2	(Brazil) Tinga (c)	(yellow card) 61'
DF	19	(Argentina) Emanuel Brítez	(yellow card) 64'
DF	4	(Brazil) Titi
DF	6	(Brazil) Bruno Pacheco		(substituted off) 82'
MF	88	(Brazil) Lucas Sasha
MF	8	(Brazil) Caio Alexandre
MF	7	(Argentina) Tomás Pochettino		(substituted off) 46'
FW	21	(Brazil) Moisés		(substituted off) 77'
FW	91	(Brazil) Thiago Galhardo		(substituted off) 77'
FW	9	(Argentina) Juan Martín Lucero
Substitutes:
GK	12	(Brazil) Kennedy
DF	3	(Colombia) Brayan Ceballos
DF	5	(Brazil) Marcelo Benevenuto			(substituted in) 90+1'
DF	20	(Brazil) Dudu
MF	10	(Brazil) Lucas Crispim		(substituted in) 82'
MF	17	(Brazil) Zé Welison
MF	22	(Brazil) Yago Pikachu	(yellow card) 90+2'	(substituted in) 77'
MF	27	(Brazil) Calebe	(yellow card) 89'	(substituted in) 46'
MF	35	(Brazil) Hércules
FW	11	(Brazil) Romarinho		(substituted in) 77'	(substituted off) 90+1'
FW	18	(Argentina) Silvio Romero	(yellow card) 89'
FW	29	(Brazil) Guilherme
Coach:
(Argentina) Juan Pablo Vojvoda

Assistant referees:
Luanderson Lima dos Santos (Bahia)
Leila Naiara Moreira da Cruz (Distrito Federal)
Fourth official:
Yuri Elino Ferreira da Cruz (Rio de Janeiro)
Fifth official:
José Moracy de Sousa e Silva
Video assistant referee:
Igor Junio Benevenuto de Oliveira (Minas Gerais)
Assistant video assistant referees:
Frederico Soares Vilarinho (Minas Gerais)
