= David Ricardo (disambiguation) =

David Ricardo (1772–1823), was a British political economist

David Ricardo may also refer to:

- David Ricardo (the younger), British Liberal Member of Parliament, son of David Ricardo
- David Ricardo (footballer), Brazilian football defender
