= Fernando Miguel (footballer, born 1985) =

Brazilian footballer

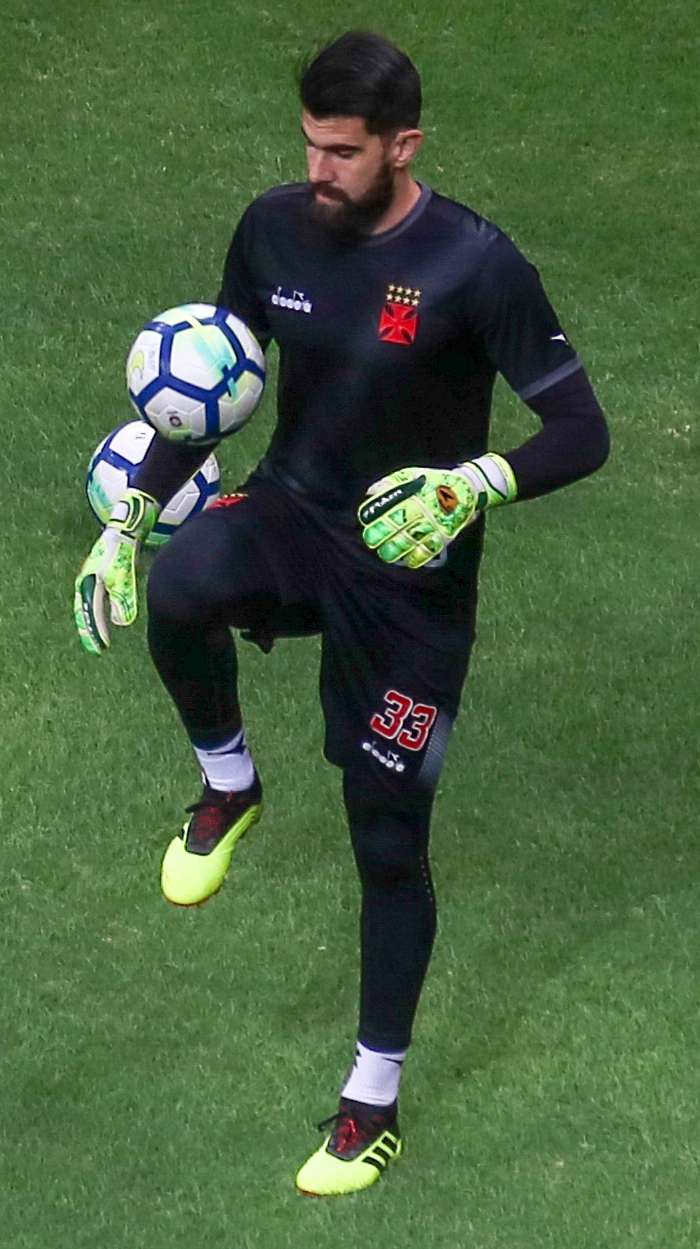

Personal information
- Full name: Fernando Miguel Kaufmann
- Date of birth: 2 February 1985 (age 41)
- Place of birth: Venâncio Aires, Brazil
- Height: 1.91 m (6 ft 3 in)
- Position: Goalkeeper

Youth career
- 2003: Guarani-VA
- 2004: Caxias
- 2005: Grêmio

Senior career*
Years	Team	Apps	(Gls)
2005	Grêmio	0	(0)
2006	Brasil de Pelotas		
2007	Porto Alegre		
2008	Novo Hamburgo		
2008	Arapongas		
2008	Londrina		
2009–2010	Esportivo	19	(0)
2011–2012	Lajeadense	31	(0)
2012–2014	Juventude	46	(0)
2013	→ Vitória (loan)	0	(0)
2014–2018	Vitória	151	(0)
2018–2021	Vasco da Gama	122	(0)
2021	→ Atlético Goianiense (loan)	54	(0)
2022–2023	Fortaleza	54	(0)
2024–2025	Ceará	0	(0)
2025	Guarani	0	(0)
- * Club domestic league appearances and goals as of 1 January 2026

Fernando Miguel Kaufmann (born 2 February 1985) is a Brazilian former footballer who played as a goalkeeper.

== Club career ==
=== Early career ===
Born in Venâncio Aires, Fernando Miguel started his senior professional career in 2005 with Grêmio. In the following years, he represented Brasil-RS, Porto Alegre, Novo Hamburgo, Arapongas, Londrina, Esportivo.

=== Juventude ===
On 4 April 2012, Fernando Miguel joined Juventude from Lajeadense. Among the matches he played for the club, it included his appearance in a 1–1 draw against Grêmio in the semi-final of Campeonato Gaúcho which was won by Juventude via the penalty shoot-out.

=== Vitória ===
On 25 September 2013, Fernando Miguel joined Série A (top tier) club Vitória. He signed permanently with the club in April 2014. In September 2017, he was diagonised with acute plantar fasciitis and was ruled out of play for a league match against Atlético-MG.

== Honours ==
Juventude

- Copa FGF: 2012

Vitória

- Campeonato Baiano: 2016 e 2017

Vasco da Gama

- Taça Guanabara: 2019

Fortaleza

- Copa do Nordeste: 2022
- Campeonato Cearense: 2022, 2023

Ceará

- Campeonato Cearense: 2024, 2025
