= 2023 Copa do Nordeste qualification =

Tournament details
- Country: Brazil
- Dates: 5 – 8 January 2023
- Teams: 16

Tournament statistics
- Matches played: 12
- Goals scored: 25 (2.08 per match)
- Top goal scorer: Wallace Pernambucano (4 goals)

The 2023 Copa do Nordeste qualification (officially the Eliminatórias Copa do Nordeste 2023) was the qualifying tournament of the 2023 Copa do Nordeste. It was played from 5 to 8 January 2023. Sixteen teams competed to decide four places in the Copa do Nordeste.

== Format changes ==
Starting from this season, the following format changes were implemented:

- Sixteen teams competed in the tournament. Every federation had a team qualified by the 2022 CBF ranking, while seven teams qualified by participating in their respective state championships.
- The teams competed in two rounds where the four winners advanced to the Copa do Nordeste.

== Qualified teams ==
Every federation had a team qualified by the 2022 CBF ranking, while the seven best placed federations in the 2022 CBF state ranking (Ceará, Bahia, Pernambuco, Alagoas, Maranhão, Rio Grande do Norte and Paraíba) earned an extra berth in the tournament by participating in their respective state championships.

Association	Team	Qualification method
(Alagoas) Alagoas; 2 berths	CSA	best placed team in the 2022 CBF ranking not already qualified
(Alagoas) Alagoas; 2 berths	ASA	2022 Campeonato Alagoano runners-up
(Bahia) Bahia; 2 berths	Vitória	best placed team in the 2022 CBF ranking not already qualified
(Bahia) Bahia; 2 berths	Jacuipense	2022 Campeonato Baiano runners-up
(Ceará) Ceará; 2 berths	Ferroviário	best placed team in the 2022 CBF ranking not already qualified
(Ceará) Ceará; 2 berths	Caucaia	2022 Campeonato Cearense runners-uo
(Maranhão) Maranhão; 2 berths	Moto Club^{[a]}	best placed team in the 2022 CBF ranking not already qualified
(Maranhão) Maranhão; 2 berths	Cordino	2022 Campeonato Maranhense runners-up
(Paraíba) Paraíba; 2 berths	Botafogo-PB	best placed team in the 2022 CBF ranking not already qualified
(Paraíba) Paraíba; 2 berths	Sousa	2022 Campeonato Paraibano 3rd place
(Pernambuco) Pernambuco; 2 berths	Santa Cruz	best placed team in the 2022 CBF ranking not already qualified
(Pernambuco) Pernambuco; 2 berths	Retrô	2022 Campeonato Pernambucano runners-up
(Piauí) Piauí; 1 berth	Altos	best placed team in the 2022 CBF ranking not already qualified
(Rio Grande do Norte) Rio Grande do Norte; 2 berths	América de Natal	best placed team in the 2022 CBF ranking not already qualified
(Rio Grande do Norte) Rio Grande do Norte; 2 berths	Potiguar de Mossoró	2022 Campeonato Potiguar 3rd place
(Sergipe) Sergipe; 1 berth	Confiança	best placed team in the 2022 CBF ranking not already qualified

^{a} Imperatriz (2022 CBF ranking 69th place) were excluded from the Copa do Nordeste because they were relegated and did not participate in the 2022 Campeonato Maranhense Série A. They were replaced by the 2022 CBF ranking 74th place Moto Club.

== Schedule ==
The schedule of the competition was as follows.

Round	First leg	Second leg
First round	5 January 2023	
Second round	8 January 2023	

== Draw ==
The teams were seeded by their 2022 CBF ranking (shown in parentheses).

Pot
(Bahia) Vitória (25); (Alagoas) CSA (30); (Sergipe) Confiança (44); (Pernambuco) Santa Cruz (46); (Paraíba) Botafogo-PB (51); (Ceará) Ferroviário (52); (Rio Grande do Norte) América de Natal (61); (Bahia) Jacuipense (65)	(Piauí) Altos (66); (Maranhão) Moto Club (74); (Alagoas) ASA (91); (Pernambuco) Retrô (114); (Ceará) Caucaia (140); (Paraíba) Sousa (143); (Rio Grande do Norte) Potiguar de Mossoró (157); (Maranhão) Cordino (181)

For the first round, the sixteen teams were drawn into eight ties, with the best seeded team playing against the sixteenth seeded team, while the second-best seeded team facing the fifteenth-best, third against fourteenth, fourth against thirteenth, etc. The higher-seeded team hosted the leg.

== Competition format ==
The teams played a single-elimination tournament with the following rules:

- The tournament was played on a single-leg basis, with the higher-seeded team hosting the leg.
  - If tied, the penalty shoot-out would be used to determine the winners.
- Extra time would not be played and away goals rule would not be used during the tournament.

== First round ==
Team 1	Score	Team 2
Vitória (Bahia)	2–1	(Maranhão) Cordino
Jacuipense (Bahia)	4–1	(Piauí) Altos
Santa Cruz (Pernambuco)	2–0	(Ceará) Caucaia
Botafogo-PB (Paraíba)	0–0 (3–1 p)	(Pernambuco) Retrô
CSA (Alagoas)	2–1	(Rio Grande do Norte) Potiguar de Mossoró
América de Natal (Rio Grande do Norte)	5–0	(Maranhão) Moto Club
Confiança (Sergipe)	1–0	(Paraíba) Sousa
Ferroviário (Ceará)	1–1 (4–3 p)	(Alagoas) ASA

== Second round ==
Team 1	Score	Team 2
Vitória (Bahia)	1–0	(Bahia) Jacuipense
Santa Cruz (Pernambuco)	2–1	(Paraíba) Botafogo-PB
CSA (Alagoas)	0–0 (5–4 p)	(Rio Grande do Norte) América de Natal
Confiança (Sergipe)	0–0 (4–5 p)	(Ceará) Ferroviário

== 2023 Copa do Nordeste qualified teams ==
The following four teams qualified for the 2023 Copa do Nordeste.

State	Team
Bahia	Vitória
Pernambuco	Santa Cruz
Alagoas	CSA
Ceará	Ferroviário

== Top goalscorers ==
Rank	Player	Team	Goals
1	(Brazil) Wallace Pernambucano	(Rio Grande do Norte) América de Natal	4
2	(Brazil) Jeam	(Bahia) Jacuipense	2
2	(Brazil) Welder	(Bahia) Jacuipense	2

Source:CBF
