= Dudu (footballer, born 1997) =

Brazilian footballer

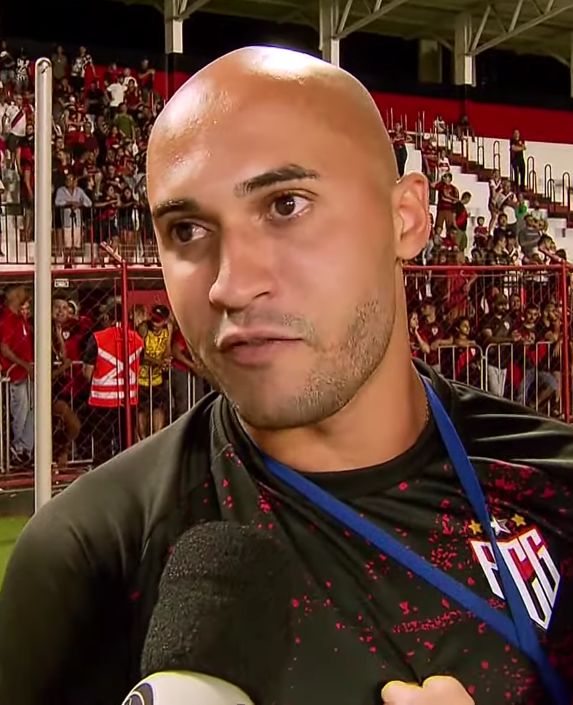
- Dudu with Atlético Goianiense in 2022

Personal information
- Full name: Luís Eduardo Marques dos Santos
- Date of birth: 30 May 1997 (age 29)
- Place of birth: Gama, Federal District, Brazil
- Height: 1.75 m (5 ft 9 in)
- Position: Right back

Team information
- Current team: Chapecoense
- Number: 23

Youth career
- 2013–2016: Figueirense

Senior career*
Years	Team	Apps	(Gls)
2016–2018	Figueirense	45	(1)
2018–2021	Internacional	9	(0)
2020–2021	→ Atlético Goianiense (loan)	44	(1)
2021–2022	Atlético Goianiense	95	(3)
2023–2025	Fortaleza	14	(0)
2024	→ Criciúma (loan)	15	(0)
2025–2026	Athletico Paranaense	6	(0)
2025	→ Atlético Goianiense (loan)	11	(1)
2026–	Guarani	3	(1)
2026–	→ Chapecoense (loan)	0	(0)
- * Club domestic league appearances and goals as of 17 August 2026

Luís Eduardo Marques dos Santos (born 30 May 1997), commonly known as Dudu is a Brazilian professional footballer who plays as a right back for Chapecoense, on loan from Guarani.

== Club career ==
=== Figueirense ===
Dudu was born in Gama, Federal District, joined the youth setup of Figueirense in 2013. Ahead of the 2016 season, he was promoted to the senior team and made his first team debut in a 1–0 victory over Fluminense.

At the end of 2017 Campeonato Catarinense, Dudu was awarded with the Best Newcomer of the Season award. He also came third in the award for the best right back of the tournament. He played regularly for the side in Série B and was included in Globo Esporte 's list of seven major revelations of the tournament.

=== Internacional ===
On 29 December 2017, Dudu signed for Internacional, newly promoted to Série A on a four-year deal. He made his debut for the club the following 27 January, starting in a 3–0 Campeonato Gaúcho home win over Avenida.

After featuring rarely during the 2018 season, Dudu suffered a serious ankle injury in November of that year, being sidelined for most of the 2019 campaign, which he did not appear with the club.

=== Atlético Goianiense ===
On 29 December 2019, Dudu was loaned to Atlético Goianiense for the 2020 season, along with teammate Gustavo Ferrareis. He immediately became a starter at his new club, and signed a permanent two-year contract with Dragão on 8 March 2021.

== Career statistics ==
As of 19 November 2022

Club	Season	League			State League		Cup		Continental		Other		Total	
Club	Season	Division	Apps	Goals	Apps	Goals	Apps	Goals	Apps	Goals	Apps	Goals	Apps	Goals
Figueirense	2016	Série A	2	0	0	0	0	0	—		—		2	0
Figueirense	2017	Série B	25	1	15	0	1	0	—		2 (Note: Appearance(s) in Primeira Liga)	0	43	1
Figueirense	Total		27	1	15	0	1	0	—		2	0	45	1
Internacional	2018	Série A	2	0	4	0	3	0	—		—		9	0
Internacional	2019	Série A	0	0	0	0	0	0	—		—		0	0
Internacional	Total		2	0	4	0	3	0	—		—		9	0
Atlético Goianiense	2020	Série A	34	0	7	1	3	0	—		—		44	1
Atlético Goianiense	2021	Série A	31	0	6	0	6	0	6 (Note: Appearance(s) in Copa Sudamericana)	0	—		49	0
Atlético Goianiense	2022	Série A	22	1	14	2	5	0	5	0	—		46	3
Atlético Goianiense	Total		77	1	27	3	14	0	11	0	—		139	4
Career total			116	2	46	3	18	0	11	0	2	0	193	5

== Honours ==
Atlético Goianiense

- Campeonato Goiano: 2020, 2022

Fortaleza

- Campeonato Cearense: 2023
- Copa do Nordeste: 2024
