= Alfredo Aguilar =

Paraguayan footballer (born 1988)

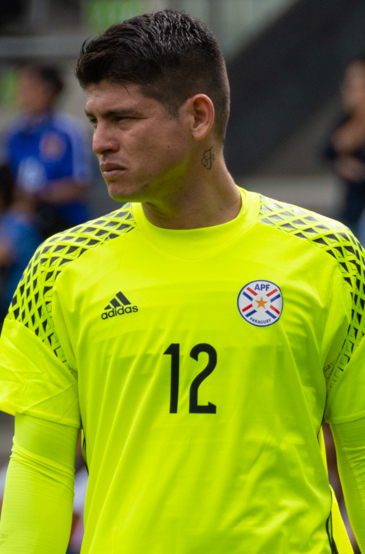
- Aguilar with Paraguay in 2018

Personal information
- Full name: Alfredo Ariel Aguilar
- Date of birth: 18 July 1988 (age 38)
- Place of birth: San Estanislao, Paraguay
- Height: 1.86 m (6 ft 1 in)
- Position: Goalkeeper

Team information
- Current team: Club 12 de Junio
- Number: 12

Youth career
- Guaraní

Senior career*
Years	Team	Apps	(Gls)
2007–2018	Guaraní	166	(0)
2018–2022	Olimpia	147	(0)
2023–2023	Ceará	0	(0)
2023–2026	Sportivo Luqueño	71	(0)
2026–present	Club 12 de Junio		

International career^{‡}
2014–2019	Paraguay	3	(0)
- * Club domestic league appearances and goals as of 13 August 2025 ‡ National team caps and goals as of 22 january 2023

Alfredo Ariel Aguilar (born 18 July 1988) is a Paraguayan professional footballer who plays as a goalkeeper for APF División Intermedia Club 12 de Junio.

== Career ==
=== Guaraní ===
Aguilar has played club football for Guarani.

=== Ceará ===
On 2 January 2023, Aguilar signed with Campeonato Brasileiro Série B club Ceará, this is his first experience abroad.

== International career ==
He was called up to the senior Paraguay squad in 2014.

Aguilar was named in Paraguay's provisional squad for Copa América Centenario but was cut from the final squad.

He made his international debut for Paraguay in a 4-2 friendly loss to Japan on 12 June 2018.

== Career statistics ==
=== Club ===
As of 22 January 2023.

Club	Season	League			Cup		Continental		Other		Total	
Club	Season	Division	Apps	Goals	Apps	Goals	Apps	Goals	Apps	Goals	Apps	Goals
Guaraní	2010	Primera División	—		—		0	0	—		0	0
Guaraní	2011	Primera División	—		—		0	0	—		0	0
Guaraní	2012	Primera División	—		—		0	0	—		0	0
Guaraní	2013	Primera División	25	0	—		2 (Note: Appearance(s) in Copa Sudamericana.)	0	—		27	0
Guaraní	2014	Primera División	25	0	—		2 (Note: Appearance(s) in Copa Libertadores.)	0	—		27	0
Guaraní	2015	Primera División	35	0	—		12	0	—		47	0
Guaraní	2016	Primera División	41	0	—		2	0	—		43	0
Guaraní	2017	Primera División	40	0	—		8	0	—		48	0
Guaraní	Total		166	0	0	0	26	0	0	0	192	0
Olimpia	2018	Primera División	40	0	—		4	0	—		44	0
Olimpia	2019	Primera División	34	0	—		7	0	—		41	0
Olimpia	2020	Primera División	30	0	—		3	0	—		33	0
Olimpia	2021	Primera División	31	0	—		8	0	1 (Note: Appearance(s) in Supercopa Paraguay.)	0	40	0
Olimpia	2022	Primera División	12	0	—		3	0	—		15	0
Olimpia	Total		147	0	0	0	25	0	1	0	173	0
Ceará	2023	Série B	0	0	0	0	—		5	0	5	0
Career total			313	0	0	0	51	0	6	0	370	0

=== International ===
As of match played 22 January 2023

Appearances and goals by national team and year
National team	Year	Apps	Goals
Paraguay	2014	0	0
Paraguay	2015	0	0
Paraguay	2016	0	0
Paraguay	2018	1	0
Paraguay	2019	2	0
Paraguay	2021	0	0
Paraguay	2022	0	0
Total		3	0

== Honours ==
Guarany

- 2016 Clausura

Olimpia

- Paraguayan Primera División: 2018 Apertura, 2018 Clausura, 2019 Apertura, 2019 Clausura, 2020 Clausura, 2022 Clausura
- Supercopa Paraguay: 2021
- Copa Paraguay: 2021

Ceará

- Copa do Nordeste: 2023
