= Hygor (footballer, born 1992) =

Brazilian footballer

Personal information
- Full name: Hygor Cléber Garcia Silva
- Date of birth: 13 August 1992 (age 34)
- Place of birth: Franca, Brazil
- Height: 1.87 m (6 ft 1 1/2 in)
- Position: Forward

Team information
- Current team: Botafogo-SP
- Number: 9

Youth career
- 2009–2010: Francana
- 2010–2011: Botafogo–SP
- 2011: Ferroviária

Senior career*
| Years | Team | Apps | (Gls) |
| 2012–2023 | Ferroviária | 73 | (20) |
| 2012 | → Ivinhema (loan) | 9 | (2) |
| 2013 | → Barretos (loan) | 1 | (0) |
| 2014 | → Guariba (loan) | 17 | (11) |
| 2015 | → Noroeste (loan) | 22 | (22) |
| 2016 | → Suwon Samsung Bluewings (loan) | 2 | (1) |
| 2017 | → Penapolense (loan) | 9 | (0) |
| 2018 | → Sport Recife (loan) | 5 | (0) |
| 2018 | → Juventude (loan) | 0 | (0) |
| 2019 | → Paysandu (loan) | 6 | (2) |
| 2021 | → Criciúma (loan) | 13 | (2) |
| 2022 | → Criciúma (loan) | 31 | (10) |
| 2023 | Ceará | 4 | (0) |
| 2023 | → Criciúma (loan) | 15 | (4) |
| 2024–2025 | Avaí | 70 | (13) |
| 2026– | Botafogo-SP | 34 | (12) |
- * Club domestic league appearances and goals as of 18 November 2026

Hygor Cléber Garcia Silva (born 13 August 1992), simply known as Hygor, is a Brazilian footballer who plays as a forward for Botafogo-SP.

== Career statistics ==
As of 10 February 2023

| Club | Season | League | | | State League | | Cup | | Continental | | Other | | Total | |
| Club | Season | Division | Apps | Goals | Apps | Goals | Apps | Goals | Apps | Goals | Apps | Goals | Apps | Goals |
|---|---|---|---|---|---|---|---|---|---|---|---|---|---|---|
| Ferroviária | 2013 | Paulista A2 | — | | — | | — | | — | | 4 (Note: Appearance(s) in Copa Paulista) | 0 | 4 | 0 |
| Ferroviária | 2015 | Paulista A2 | — | | 1 | 1 | — | | — | | — | | 1 | 1 |
| Ferroviária | 2017 | Paulista | — | | — | | — | | — | | 23 | 12 | 23 | 12 |
| Ferroviária | 2018 | Série D | — | | 13 | 3 | — | | — | | — | | 13 | 3 |
| Ferroviária | 2019 | Série D | 2 | 0 | 1 | 0 | — | | — | | — | | 3 | 0 |
| Ferroviária | 2020 | Série D | 9 | 1 | 12 | 2 | 4 | 1 | — | | — | | 25 | 4 |
| Ferroviária | 2021 | Série D | 0 | 0 | 9 | 1 | — | | — | | — | | 9 | 1 |
| Ferroviária | 2022 | Série D | 0 | 0 | 10 | 3 | — | | — | | — | | 10 | 3 |
| Ferroviária | Subtotal | | 11 | 1 | 46 | 10 | 4 | 1 | — | | 27 | 12 | 98 | 24 |
| Ivinhema (loan) | 2012 | Sul-Mato-Grossense | — | | 9 | 2 | — | | — | | — | | 9 | 2 |
| Barretos (loan) | 2013 | Paulista A3 | — | | 1 | 0 | — | | — | | — | | 1 | 0 |
| Guariba (loan) | 2014 | Paulista 2ª Divisão | — | | 17 | 11 | — | | — | | — | | 17 | 11 |
| Noroeste (loan) | 2015 | Paulista 2ª Divisão | — | | 22 | 22 | — | | — | | — | | 22 | 22 |
| Suwon Samsung Bluewings (loan) | 2016 | K League 1 | 2 | 1 | — | | — | | 1 (Note: Appearance(s) in AFC Champions League) | 0 | — | | 3 | 1 |
| Penapolense (loan) | 2017 | Paulista A2 | — | | 9 | 0 | — | | — | | — | | 9 | 0 |
| Sport Recife (loan) | 2018 | Série A | 5 | 0 | — | | — | | — | | — | | 5 | 0 |
| Juventude (loan) | 2018 | Série B | 0 | 0 | — | | — | | — | | — | | 0 | 0 |
| Paysandu (loan) | 2019 | Série C | 6 | 2 | — | | — | | — | | 3 (Note: Appearance(s) in Copa Verde) | 1 | 9 | 3 |
| Criciúma (loan) | 2021 | Série C | 13 | 2 | — | | — | | — | | — | | 13 | 2 |
| Criciúma (loan) | 2022 | Série B | 31 | 10 | — | | — | | — | | — | | 31 | 10 |
| Ceará | 2023 | Série B | 0 | 0 | 1 | 0 | 0 | 0 | — | | — | | 1 | 0 |
| Career total | | | 68 | 16 | 105 | 45 | 4 | 1 | 1 | 0 | 30 | 13 | 208 | 75 |

== Honours ==
Ferroviária

- Campeonato Paulista Série A2: 2015
- Copa Paulista: 2017

Cricúma

- Campeonato Catarinense Série B: 2022

Ceará

- Copa do Nordeste: 2023

Avaí

- Campeonato Catarinense: 2025
