= Léo Rafael =

Brazilian footballer

Personal information
- Full name: Leonardo Rafael dos Santos
- Date of birth: 25 April 2001 (age 25)
- Place of birth: Campinas, Brazil
- Height: 1.81 m (5 ft 11 in)
- Position: Midfielder

Team information
- Current team: Ypiranga (on loan from Nova Iguaçu)
- Number: 10

Youth career
- 2016: Barretos
- 2017: Rio Claro
- 2017–2018: Juventude
- 2018–2019: Bragantino
- 2021: Ceará

Senior career*
Years	Team	Apps	(Gls)
2019–2020	Grêmio Osasco	6	(1)
2020–2021	Caldense	4	(0)
2021–2025	Ceará	4	(1)
2023	→ América-RN (loan)	11	(0)
2024	→ Ferroviário (loan)	4	(1)
2025	→ Villa Nova (loan)	5	(0)
2025–	Nova Iguaçu	12	(5)
2026–	→ Ypiranga (loan)	14	(2)
- * Club domestic league appearances and goals as of 13:10, 10 November 2026 (UTC)

Leonardo Rafael dos Santos (born 25 April 2001), known as Léo Rafael, is a Brazilian footballer who plays as a midfielder for Ypiranga, on loan from Nova Iguaçu.

== Club career ==
Born in Campinas, São Paulo, Léo Rafael played youth football for Barretos, Rio Claro, Juventude and Bragantino, leaving the latter in 2019 when the club merged with Red Bull Brasil. He subsequently joined Grêmio Osasco, and made his senior debut during the 2019 Copa Paulista.

On 12 September 2020, Léo Rafael signed for Caldense. The following 17 March, he moved to Ceará, being initially assigned to the under-20 squad.

On 6 September 2021, Léo Rafael renewed his contract with Ceará for a further year. He was promoted to the first team on 27 December, and made his first team debut for the club the following 22 February, starting in a 2–1 Campeonato Cearense home win over Iguatu.

Léo Rafael made his Série A debut on 17 April 2022, coming on as a late substitute for Richard in a 1–3 home loss against Botafogo.

== Career statistics ==
As of 18 April 2022

Club	Season	League			State League		Cup		Continental		Other		Total	
Club	Season	Division	Apps	Goals	Apps	Goals	Apps	Goals	Apps	Goals	Apps	Goals	Apps	Goals
Grêmio Osasco	2019	Paulista A3	—		0	0	—		—		8 (Note: Appearance(s) in Copa Paulista)	1	8	1
Grêmio Osasco	2020	Paulista A3	—		6	1	—		—		—		6	1
Grêmio Osasco	Total		—		6	1	—		—		8	1	14	2
Caldense	2020	Série D	2	0	2	0	—		—		—		4	0
Ceará	2021	Série A	0	0	0	0	0	0	—		0	0	0	0
Ceará	2022	Série A	1	0	1	0	2	0	0	0	4 (Note: Appearance(s) in Copa do Nordeste)	0	8	0
Ceará	Total		1	0	1	0	2	0	0	0	4	0	8	0
Career total			3	0	9	1	2	0	0	0	12	1	26	2

== Honours ==
Ceará

- Copa do Nordeste: 2023
