= Willian Maranhão =

Brazilian footballer (born 1995)

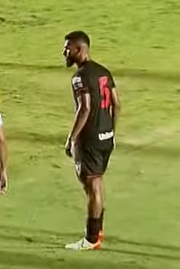
- Willian Maranhão with Atlético Goianiense in 2021

Personal information
- Full name: Willian Marlon Ferreira Moraes
- Date of birth: 14 December 1995 (age 30)
- Place of birth: São Luís, Brazil
- Height: 1.79 m (5 ft 10 1/2 in)
- Position: Defensive midfielder

Team information
- Current team: Vila Nova
- Number: 8

Youth career
- 2013: Boavista

Senior career*
Years	Team	Apps	(Gls)
2014–2018	Boavista	65	(2)
2018	→ Santa Cruz (loan)	9	(0)
2018	→ Vasco da Gama (loan)	14	(0)
2019–2020	Vasco da Gama	4	(0)
2019	→ América Mineiro (loan)	27	(0)
2020–2021	Atlético Goianiense	83	(0)
2022	Bahia	9	(0)
2022–2023	Santos	4	(0)
2022	→ Atlético Goianiense (loan)	18	(0)
2023	→ Ceará (loan)	18	(1)
2024	Avaí	31	(1)
2025	Atlético Goianiense	14	(0)
2025	Hanoi FC	10	(0)
2026–	Vila Nova	13	(0)
- * Club domestic league appearances and goals as of 14 April 2026

Willian Marlon Ferreira Moraes (born 14 December 1995), known as Willian Maranhão, is a Brazilian footballer who plays as a defensive midfielder for Vila Nova.

== Club career ==
=== Boavista ===
Born in São Luís, Maranhão, Willian Maranhão was a Boavista youth graduate. He made his first team debut on 21 January 2014, coming on as a second-half substitute for Thiaguinho in a 1–0 Campeonato Carioca home win over Madureira.

Willian Maranhão subsequently became a regular starter for the side, and scored his first senior goal on 13 September 2017, netting his team's third in a 3–1 home success against Tigres do Brasil, for the year's Copa Rio.

In June 2018, Willian Maranhão was loaned to Série C side Santa Cruz until the end of the tournament. He was a regular starter during his period at the club before terminating his loan deal on 30 August.

=== Vasco da Gama ===
On 5 September 2018, Willian Maranhão was presented at Série A side Vasco da Gama, on loan until the end of the year. He made his top tier debut five days later, starting in a 0–1 away loss against Vitória.

On 4 December 2018, Willian Maranhão signed a permanent deal with Vasco until the end of 2022. However, he lost his starting spot in the 2019 campaign, and moved out on loan to América Mineiro until the end of the season in May of that year.

Upon returning from loan, Willian Maranhão failed to appear for the club until rescinding his contract in July 2020.

=== Atlético Goianiense ===
Shortly after leaving Vasco, Willian Maranhão signed a permanent deal with Atlético Goianiense. He immediately became a regular starter, but still left the club on 13 December 2021.

=== Bahia ===
On 9 January 2022, Willian Maranhão signed a two-year contract with Bahia, freshly relegated to the second division. He arrived with a first-choice status, but lost his starting spot to fellow new signing Rezende.

=== Santos ===
On 25 March 2022, Bahia announced the transfer of Willian Maranhão to Santos, who paid a R$ 500,000 fee for 70% of the player's economic rights. Just hours later, his new club confirmed the deal, with the player signing a contract until December 2024.

Willian Maranhão made his debut for Peixe on 5 April 2022, starting in a 0–1 Copa Sudamericana away loss against Banfield. On 16 July, after just nine matches, he returned to Atlético Goianiense on loan until the end of the year.

On 10 February 2023, Willian Maranhão joined Ceará on loan for the 2023 season.

=== Avaí ===
On 2 January 2024, Maranhão agreed to join Avaí after terminating his contract with Santos.

== Career statistics ==
As of 5 December 2023

Club	Season	League			State League		Cup		Continental		Other		Total	
Club	Season	Division	Apps	Goals	Apps	Goals	Apps	Goals	Apps	Goals	Apps	Goals	Apps	Goals
Boavista	2014	Série D	6	0	10	0	2	0	—		12 (Note: Appearance(s) in Copa Rio)	1	30	1
Boavista	2015	Carioca	—		10	0	1	0	—		—		11	0
Boavista	2016	Série D	4	0	8	0	—		—		4	0	16	0
Boavista	2017	Série D	8	0	7	0	3	0	—		7	1	25	1
Boavista	2018	Carioca	—		12	0	—		—		—		12	0
Boavista	Subtotal		18	0	47	0	6	0	—		23	2	94	2
Santa Cruz	2018	Série C	9	0	—		—		—		—		9	0
Vasco da Gama	2018	Série A	14	0	—		—		—		—		14	0
Vasco da Gama	2019	Série A	—		2	0	2	0	—		—		4	0
Vasco da Gama	Subtotal		14	0	2	0	2	0	—		—		18	0
América Mineiro	2019	Série B	28	0	—		—		—		—		28	0
Atlético Goianiense	2020	Série A	22	0	4	0	2	0	—		—		28	0
Atlético Goianiense	2021	Série A	34	0	10	0	6	0	5 (Note: Appearance(s) in Copa Sudamericana)	0	—		55	0
Atlético Goianiense	Subtotal		56	0	14	0	8	0	5	0	—		83	0
Bahia	2022	Série B	0	0	3	0	0	0	—		6 (Note: Appearance(s) in Copa do Nordeste)	0	9	0
Santos	2022	Série A	4	0	—		1	0	4	0	—		9	0
Atlético Goianiense (loan)	2022	Série A	18	0	—		—		—		—		18	0
Ceará (loan)	2023	Série B	18	1	0	0	0	0	—		3	0	21	1
Avaí	2024	Série B	0	0	0	0	0	0	—		—		0	0
Career total			165	1	66	0	17	0	9	0	32	2	289	3

== Honours ==
Boavista

- Copa Rio: 2017

Atlético Goianiense

- Campeonato Goiano: 2020

Ceará

- Copa do Nordeste: 2023
