= Willian Formiga =

Brazilian footballer

Personal information
- Full name: Willian Prado Camargo
- Date of birth: 22 January 1995 (age 31)
- Place of birth: Cascavel, Brazil
- Height: 1.85 m (6 ft 1 in)
- Position: Left back

Team information
- Current team: Vila Nova
- Number: 13

Youth career
- 2013: Roma
- 2013: Cascavel

Senior career*
Years	Team	Apps	(Gls)
2014	Tubarão		
2015	Apucarana Sports		
2015–2016	Cianorte	7	(0)
2016	Brusque	3	(0)
2016–2017	Vitória Guimarães B	1	(0)
2018–	Cianorte	21	(0)
2019	→ Brasil de Pelotas (loan)	18	(0)
2020	→ Novorizontino (loan)	2	(0)
2020–2022	Vila Nova	115	(2)
2023	Ceará	21	(0)
2024	CRB	30	(0)
2025–	Vila Nova	58	(2)
- * Club domestic league appearances and goals as of 14 April 2026

Willian Prado Camargo (born 22 January 1995), known as Willian Formiga, is a Brazilian football player who plays as a left back for Vila Nova.

== Club career ==
He made his professional debut in the Segunda Liga for Vitória Guimarães B on 10 December 2016 in a game against Braga B.

== Honours ==
Cianorte

- Campeonato Paranaense Série Prata: 2016

Bahia

- Campeonato Brasileiro Série C: 2020

Ceará

- Copa do Nordeste: 2023
