= Richard (footballer, born 1991) =

Brazilian footballer

Richard Costa
Personal information
- Full name: Richard de Oliveira Costa
- Date of birth: 1 March 1991 (age 35)
- Place of birth: São Paulo, Brazil
- Height: 1.86 m (6 ft 1 in)
- Position: Goalkeeper

Team information
- Current team: Ceará
- Number: 1

Youth career
- 2009–2010: São Paulo

Senior career*
Years	Team	Apps	(Gls)
2010–2012	São Paulo	0	(0)
2010	→ União São João (loan)	2	(0)
2011	→ América-SP (loan)	4	(0)
2012–2013	Paulista	19	(0)
2014–2015	Rio Claro	14	(0)
2015	Operário Ferroviário	5	(0)
2016–2017	Água Santa	22	(0)
2017	→ Paraná (loan)	32	(0)
2018	Paraná	29	(0)
2019–	Ceará	131	(0)
- * Club domestic league appearances and goals as of 18 November 2026

Richard de Oliveira Costa (born 1 March 1991), simply known as Richard Costa, is a Brazilian footballer who plays for Ceará as a goalkeeper.

== Career statistics ==
As of match played 19 September 2024

Appearances and goals by club, season and competition
Club	Season	League			State League		Copa do Brasil		Continental		Other		Total	
Club	Season	Division	Apps	Goals	Apps	Goals	Apps	Goals	Apps	Goals	Apps	Goals	Apps	Goals
São Paulo	2010	Série A	0	0	0	0	0	0	0	0	—		0	0
São Paulo	2011	Série A	0	0	0	0	0	0	0	0	—		0	0
São Paulo	Total	0	0	0	0	0	0	0	0	0	—		0	0
União São João (loan)	2010	—			2 (Note: Appearance(s) in Campeonato Paulista Série A2)	0	—		—		—		2	0
América-SP (loan)	2011	—			4	0	—		—		—		4	0
Paulista	2012	—			0	0	0	0	—		—		0	0
Paulista	2013	—			19 (Note: Appearance(s) in Campeonato Paulista)	0	—		—		12 (Note: Appearance(s) in Copa Paulista)	0	31	0
Paulista	Total		—		19	0	0	0	—		12	0	31	0
Rio Claro	2014	—			0	0	—		—		—		0	0
Rio Claro	2015	—			14	0	—		—		—		14	0
Rio Claro	Total		—		14	0	—		—		—		14	0
Operário Ferroviário	2015	Série D	5	0	0	0	—		—		—		5	0
Água Santa	2016	—			2	0	—		—		12	0	14	0
Água Santa	2017	—			20	0	—		—		—		20	0
Água Santa	Total		—≠		22	0	—		—		12	0	34	0
Paraná (loan)	2017	Série B	32	0	0	0	0	0	—		2 (Note: Appearance(s) in Primeira Liga)	0	34	0
Paraná	2018	Série A	23	0	6 (Note: Appearance(s) in Campeonato Paranaense)	0	0	0	—		—		29	0
Ceará	2019	Série A	1	0	6 (Note: Appearance(s) in Campeonato Cearense)	0	3	0	—		6 (Note: Appearance(s) in Copa do Nordeste)	0	16	0
Ceará	2020	Série A	16	0	0	0	0	0	—		0	0	16	0
Ceará	2021	Série A	22	0	2	0	2	0	5 (Note: Appearance(s) in Copa Sudamericana)	0	12	0	43	0
Ceará	2022	Série A	1	0	0	0	0	0	2	0	2	0	5	0
Ceará	2023	Série B	13	0	7	0	2	0	—		9	0	31	0
Ceará	2024	Série B	26	0	4	0	2	0	—		7	0	39	0
Ceará	2025	Série A	0	0	0	0	0	0	—		0	0	0	0
Ceará	Total		79	0	19	0	9	0	7	0	36	0	150	0
Career total			139	0	86	0	9	0	7	0	62	0	303	0

== Honours ==
Ceará

- Copa do Nordeste: 2020, 2023
- Campeonato Cearense: 2024, 2025
