= Vitor Gabriel (footballer, born 2000) =

Brazilian footballer

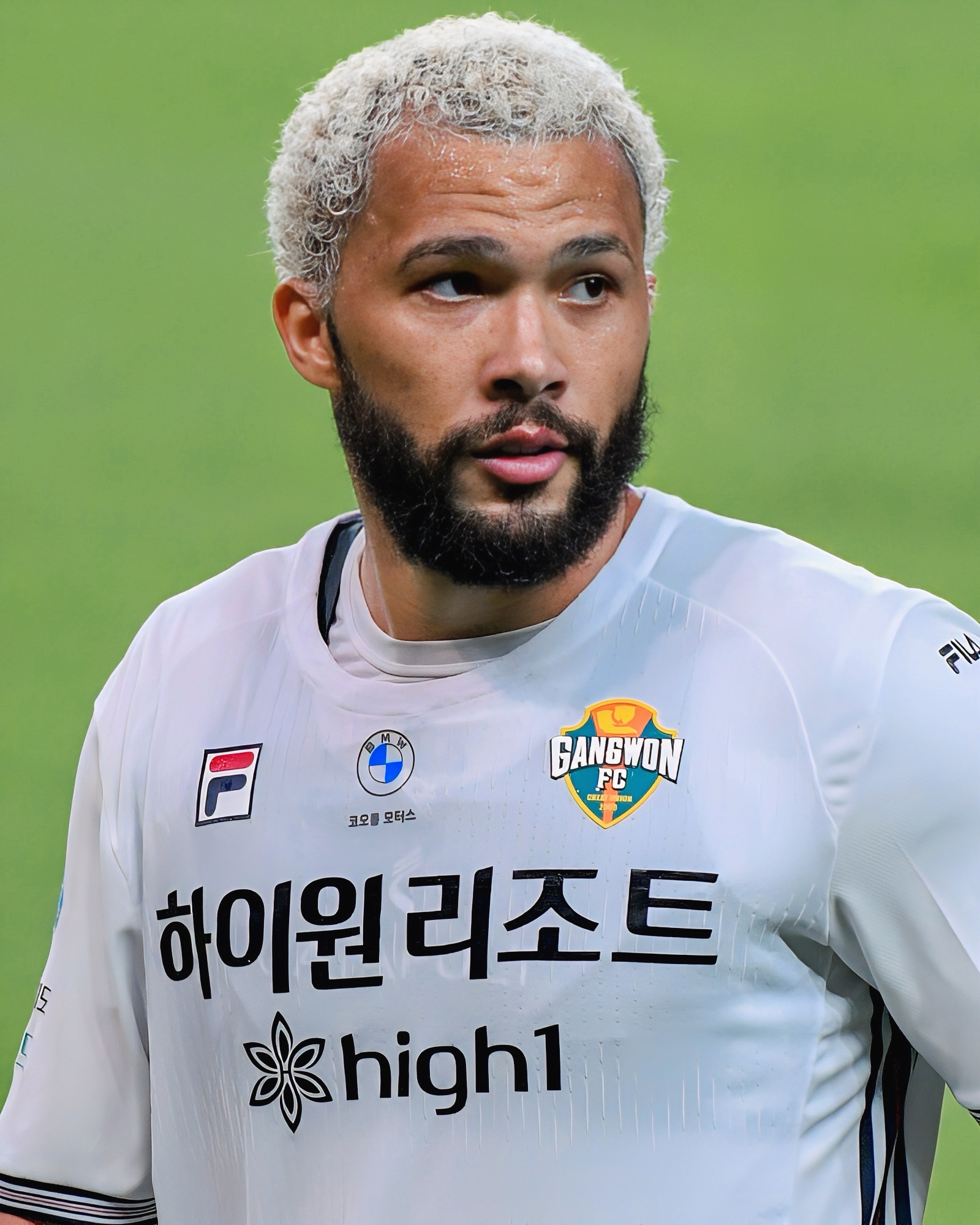
- Vitor Gabriel in 2025

Personal information
- Full name: Vitor Gabriel Claudino Rego Ferreira
- Date of birth: 20 January 2000 (age 26)
- Place of birth: Rio de Janeiro, Brazil
- Height: 1.84 m (6 ft 1/2 in)
- Position: Forward

Team information
- Current team: Bucheon
- Number: 63

Youth career
- 2015: Nova Iguaçu
- 2016: Flamengo
- 2017: Nova Iguaçu
- 2017–2019: Flamengo

Senior career*
Years	Team	Apps	(Gls)
2018–2023	Flamengo	19	(0)
2020–2021	→ Braga B (loan)	31	(11)
2022	→ Juventude (loan)	31	(3)
2023	→ Ceará (loan)	19	(7)
2023–2025	Gangwon FC	56	(9)
2026–	Bucheon	17	(5)
- * Club domestic league appearances and goals as of 4 August 2026

Vitor Gabriel Claudino Rego Ferreira (born 20 January 2000), commonly known as Vitor Gabriel, is a Brazilian footballer who currently plays for K League 1 club Bucheon.

== Career ==
=== Flamengo ===
On 16 October 2019, Vitor Gabriel played his first Campeonato Brasileiro Série A match against Fortaleza at Castelão, he replaced Gerson on the 46th minute and netted an assist to Reinier score the winning goal, Flamengo won 2–1.

On 14 December 2022, Vitor Gabriel extended his contract for another six months until 30 June 2024 and then loaned to Ceará for the 2023 season.

==== Braga (loan) ====
On 28 January 2020, Vitor Gabriel was loaned to Portuguese club Braga through the end of 2020.

==== Juventude (loan) ====
On 4 January 2022, Juventude signed a one-year loan deal with Vitor Gabriel until 31 December 2022.

==== Ceará (loan) ====
On 14 December 2022, Vitor Gabriel signed on loan with Ceará until 31 December 2023.

=== Gangwon FC ===
On 4 July 2023, Vitor Gabriel moved to Gangwon FC on a deal worth €1.1m.

== Career statistics ==
=== Club ===
As of 22 May 2025.

Club	Season	League			State League		Cup		Continental		Other		Total	
Club	Season	Division	Apps	Goals	Apps	Goals	Apps	Goals	Apps	Goals	Apps	Goals	Apps	Goals
Flamengo	2018	Série A	—		2 (Note: Appearances in the Campeonato Carioca.)	0	—		—		—		2	0
Flamengo	2019	Série A	1	0	6	0	0	0	—		—		7	0
Flamengo	2020	Série A	—		3	0	—		—		—		3	0
Flamengo	2021	Série A	3	0	—		1	0	—		—		4	0
Flamengo	Total		4	0	11	0	1	0	—		—		16	0
Braga B (loan)	2019–20	Liga Portugal 2	5	0	—		—		—		—		5	0
Braga B (loan)	2020–21	Liga Portugal 2	26	11	—		—		—		—		26	11
Braga B (loan)	Total		31	11	—		—		—		—		31	11
Juventude (loan)	2022	Série A	22	2	9 (Note: Appearances in the Campeonato Gaúcho.)	1	4	0	—		—		35	3
Ceará (loan)	2023	Série B	10	4	9 (Note: Appearances in the Campeonato Cearense.)	3	2	1	—		9 (Note: Appearances in the Copa do Nordeste.)	3	30	11
Gangwon FC	2023	K League 1	14	3	—		—		—		2 (Note: Appearances in the K League Promotion-Relegation play-offs.)	2	16	5
Gangwon FC	2024	K League 1	13	0	—		1	0	—		—		14	0
Gangwon FC	2025	K League 1	10	1	—		1	0	0	0	—		11	1
Gangwon FC	Total		37	4	—		2	0	0	0	2	2	41	6
Career total			104	21	29	4	9	1	0	0	11	5	153	31

== Honours ==
=== Clubs ===
Flamengo

- Campeonato Brasileiro Série A: 2019
- Campeonato Carioca: 2019

Ceará

- Copa do Nordeste: 2023
