= Léo Tocantins =

Brazilian footballer

Personal information
- Full name: Leonardo Santiago Barcelar
- Date of birth: 3 July 1999 (age 27)
- Place of birth: Nova Olinda, Tocantins, Brazil
- Height: 1.76 m (5 ft 9 in)
- Position: Forward

Team information
- Current team: Atlético Goianiense

Youth career
- 2015–2016: Rio Claro
- 2017–2019: Novorizontino
- 2018–2019: → Bahia (loan)

Senior career*
Years	Team	Apps	(Gls)
2018–2025	Novorizontino	111	(7)
2022	→ Sampaio Corrêa (loan)	14	(0)
2026	Noroeste	4	(0)
2026–	Atlético Goianiense	4	(0)
- * Club domestic league appearances and goals as of 20 April 2026

Leonardo Santiago Barcelar (born 3 July 1999), better known as Léo Tocantins, is a Brazilian professional footballer who plays as a forward for Campeonato Brasileiro Série B club Atlético Goianiense.

== Career ==
Originally from Novorizontino's youth ranks, he played for the club from 2018 to 2025, making over 100 appearances. In 2026, he played in the state championship for Noroeste and subsequently transferred to Atlético Goianiense.
