= Esporte Clube Noroeste =

Noroeste
- Full name: Esporte Clube Noroeste
- Nicknames: Norusca; Maquininha Vermelha
- Founded: September 1, 1910 (115 years ago)
- Ground: Estádio Alfredo de Castilho
- Capacity: 18,866
- President: Emílio Brumati
- Head coach: Moisés Egert
- League: Campeonato Brasileiro Série D Campeonato Paulista
- 2025: Paulista, 14th of 16
- Website: ecnoroeste.com.br
| Home colors | Away colors |

Esporte Clube Noroeste, commonly referred to as Noroeste, is a Brazilian professional association football club based in Bauru, São Paulo. The team competes in the Campeonato Paulista Série A1, the first tier of the São Paulo state football league.

Named after a now-defunct railway, Noroeste is a very traditional team within São Paulo state. Their home ground is Estádio Alfredo de Castilho (supports 18,866 people).

== History ==
Noroeste was founded on September 1, 1910, on the same day as Corinthians, one of the most popular club in Brazil. The club became professional only in 1948. Before that year, it won the Campeonato do Interior, the most prestigious tournament among São Paulo countryside teams, in 1943.

Ten years later (1953), Noroeste were promoted to Campeonato Paulista (state championship) first division. Until 1966, they played against many of the best teams of the country, including legendary Pelé's Santos. After that year, Noroeste has built a history of promotions and relegations to the 1980s. The club reached Campeonato Brasileiro (national first division) once, in 1978.

The 1990s marked one of the hardest period in Noroeste history. They were relegated to Campeonato Paulista Série A-3 (state third division) twice (1994 and 1999) to finally return to Série A-1 (state first division) only in 2005, boosted by the wealth support from chairman Damião Garcia, elected in 2003.

At 2006 season, Noroeste finished Campeonato Paulista in the fourth position, the best in whole club history. They were in Copa do Brasil (Brazil Cup) for the first time, but lost to 15 de Novembro (Campo Bom) yet on early stages. On Série C (national third division), Noroeste reached the third phase, but failed to promote.

2007 season ended with a good general performance for the club, despite first round disqualification in Série C. Noroeste finished 7th on Campeonato Paulista, their third best effort ever. The club was second to Guaratinguetá in Campeonato do Interior and advanced to second round in Copa do Brasil, where runners-up Figueirense defeated them.

The financial struggle when former chairman Damião Garcia ended Kalunga's sponsorship marked the end of an era. A succession of relegation brought the club from First to Last Division of state championship in only 5 years time. In 2015, for the first time in his centennial history, Noroeste played Campeonato Paulista Segunda Divisão, the fourth and last division. Promotion was granted one year later after an irregular season, but enough to qualify among the four best teams. Noroeste has been disputing Campeonato Paulista Série A3 since 2016.

In 2022, Noroeste beat Comercial (4-3 on aggregated) winning Campeonato Paulista Série A3 for the second time. The club was also promoted to Campeonato Paulista Série A2 after defeating São Bernardo on Semifinals.

== Stadium ==
Noroeste plays their home matches on Alfredo de Castilho stadium. Today's maximum attendance is of 18,840. Public record was 22,863 in a Campeonato Paulista match against Palmeiras.

== Honours ==
=== Official tournaments ===
State
| Competitions | Titles | Seasons |
|---|---|---|
| Copa Paulista | 2 | 2005, 2012 |
| Campeonato Paulista Série A2 | 4 | 1943, 1953, 1970, 1984 |
| Campeonato Paulista Série A3 | 2 | 1995, 2022 |

=== Runners-up ===
- Campeonato Paulista Série A2 (4): 1986, 2005, 2010, 2024

== Current squad ==
As of 11 February 2026

Note: Flags indicate national team as defined under FIFA eligibility rules; some limited exceptions apply. Players may hold more than one non-FIFA nationality.

| No. | Pos. | Nation | Player |
|---|---|---|---|
| 1 | GK | BRA | Luiz Daniel |
| 2 | DF | BRA | Jhonny (on loan from Fluminense) |
| 3 | DF | BRA | Carlinhos |
| 5 | DF | BRA | Pedro Carrerette |
| 6 | DF | BRA | PH |
| 7 | FW | BRA | Pedro Felipe |
| 8 | MF | BRA | Léo Sena |
| 9 | FW | BRA | Carlão |
| 10 | MF | BRA | Thiago Lopes |
| 11 | FW | BRA | Marlyson |
| 12 | DF | BRA | Sánchez |
| 15 | MF | BRA | Tauã |
| 18 | FW | BRA | Rafael Silva |
| 19 | FW | BRA | Léo Tocantins |
| 20 | DF | BRA | Wesley Santos (on loan from Mirassol) |
| 22 | DF | BRA | Renan Araújo |

| No. | Pos. | Nation | Player |
|---|---|---|---|
| 23 | MF | BRA | Igor Cristiano |
| 27 | FW | BRA | Diego Mathias |
| 30 | DF | BRA | Leocovick (on loan from Inter de Limeira) |
| 33 | DF | BRA | Ronaldo Alves |
| 44 | DF | BRA | Maycon |
| 70 | MF | BRA | Cristiano (on loan from Sagan Tosu) |
| 72 | MF | BRA | Daniel Peixoto |
| 88 | MF | BRA | Denner |
| 94 | GK | BRA | Jeferson Romário |
| 95 | DF | BRA | Yuri Ferraz |
| 99 | GK | BRA | Henrique Lima |
| — | MF | BRA | Lucas Belém |
| — | FW | BRA | Cauã Aguiar |
| — | FW | BRA | Robertinho |
| — | FW | BRA | Thiaguinho |

=== Current staff ===
| Position | Staff |
|---|---|
| Head coach | Guilherme Alves |
| Assistant managers | Xandão; Pereira |
| Goalkeeping coach | Bruno Daniel |
| Fitness coaches | André Martins; Matheus Morilha |

Last updated: 20 February 2025

== Former Players ==
(Brazil) Jacksen F. Tiago (1993)

== Rivals ==
Noroeste's main rivals are Marília and XV de Jaú.
