= Tiago Pagnussat =

Brazilian footballer

Personal information
- Full name: Tiago Pagnussat
- Date of birth: 17 June 1990 (age 36)
- Place of birth: São Jorge d'Oeste, Brazil
- Height: 1.91 m (6 ft 3 in)
- Position: Centre back

Team information
- Current team: Vila Nova
- Number: 3

Youth career
- Criciúma

Senior career*
Years	Team	Apps	(Gls)
2010–2011	Criciúma	6	(0)
2011	Vila Aurora	3	(0)
2012	Caxias	14	(2)
2013	Guarani	12	(3)
2013–2014	Caxias	45	(6)
2014–2017	Atlético Mineiro	24	(3)
2016–2017	→ Bahia (loan)	61	(4)
2018–2020	Bahia	30	(3)
2019	→ Lanús (loan)	6	(0)
2020	→ Ceará (loan)	22	(2)
2020–2021	Ceará	13	(0)
2021–2022	Cerezo Osaka	15	(4)
2022	→ Nagoya Grampus (loan)	14	(0)
2023	Ceará	27	(2)
2024	Avaí	41	(4)
2025–	Vila Nova	61	(2)
- * Club domestic league appearances and goals as of 14 April 2026

Tiago Pagnussat (born 17 June 1990) is a Brazilian professional footballer who plays as a centre back for Vila Nova.

== Club career ==
Born in São Jorge d'Oeste, Paraná, Tiago graduated from Criciúma's youth setup, but failed to appear in any official matches for the club. In July 2011 he moved to Vila Aurora, appearing sparingly in Série D.

On 24 August 2011 Tiago joined Caxias. Initially a backup, he appeared in 14 matches during the campaign, scoring two goals.

In January 2013 Tiago signed an 18-month deal with Guarani. Despite being a starter in the year's Campeonato Paulista (which the club finished dead last), he rescinded his link in May, and eventually returned to Caxias.

In August 2014, after impressing with the latter in both Campeonato Gaúcho and Série C, Tiago signed a four-year deal with Série A side Atlético Mineiro. He made his debut in the competition on 25 October, netting his side's first through a direct free kick in a 3–2 home win against Sport Recife.

== Honours ==
Atlético Mineiro

- Copa do Brasil: 2014
- Campeonato Mineiro: 2015

Bahia

- Copa do Nordeste: 2017
- Campeonato Baiano: 2018

Ceará

- Copa do Nordeste: 2020, 2023
