= Juan Martín Lucero =

Argentine footballer

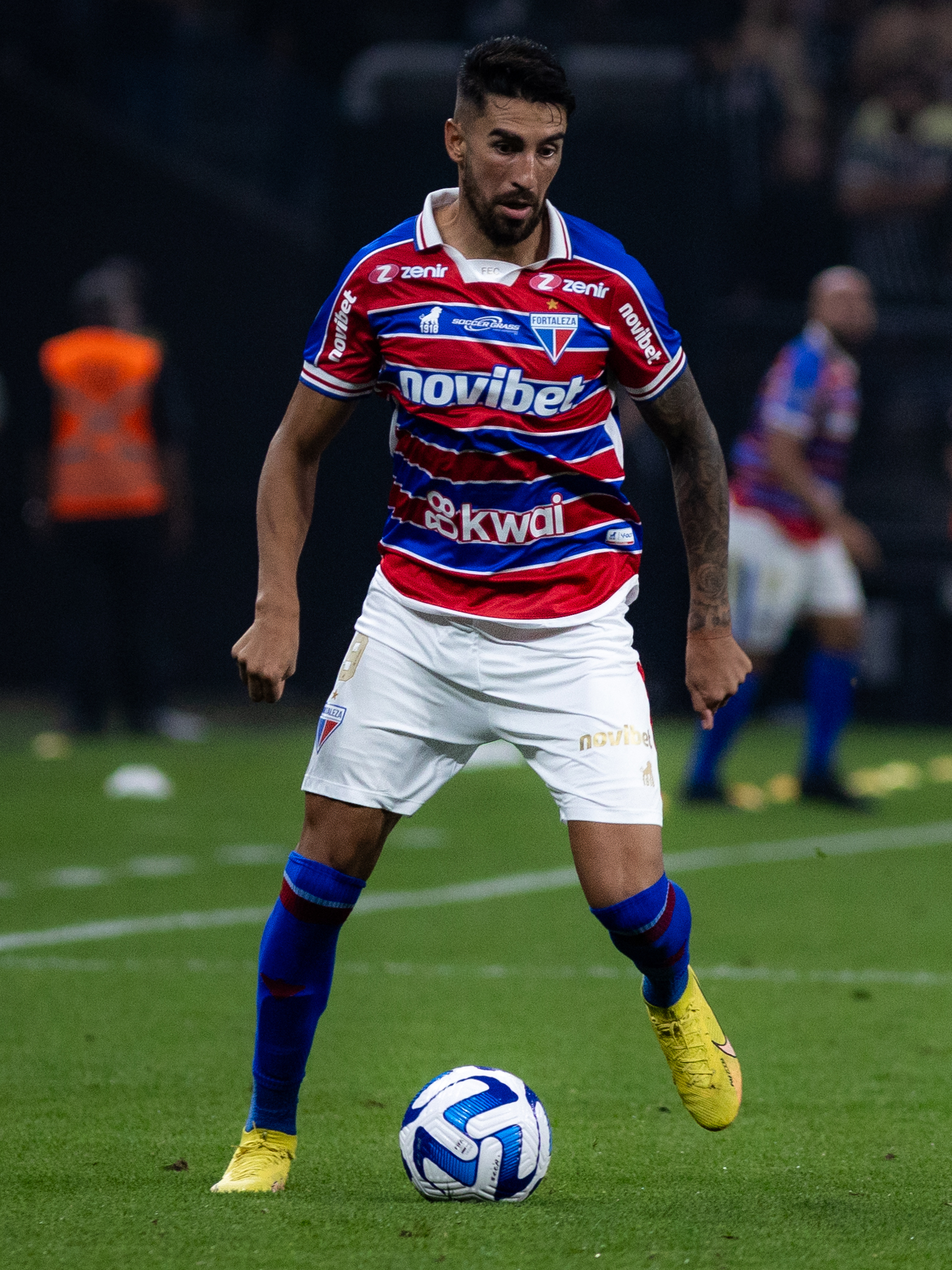
- Lucero with Fortaleza in 2023

Personal information
- Full name: Juan Martín Lucero
- Date of birth: 10 October 1991 (age 35)
- Place of birth: Junín, Argentina
- Height: 1.79 m (5 ft 10 in)
- Position: Forward

Team information
- Current team: Universidad de Chile
- Number: 18

Youth career
- 2006–2009: Defensa y Justicia

Senior career*
Years	Team	Apps	(Gls)
2010–2014	Defensa y Justicia	65	(26)
2015–2016	Independiente	34	(9)
2016–2017	Johor Darul Ta'zim	22	(16)
2017–2021	Tijuana	61	(13)
2019	→ Godoy Cruz (loan)	7	(1)
2019–2020	→ Defensa y Justicia (loan)	11	(5)
2020–2021	→ Vélez Sarsfield (loan)	48	(14)
2022–2023	Colo-Colo	26	(15)
2023–2025	Fortaleza	113	(30)
2026–	Universidad de Chile	0	(0)
- * Club domestic league appearances and goals as of 15 December 2025

Juan Martín Lucero (born 30 November 1991) is an Argentine footballer who currently plays as a forward for Universidad de Chile.

== Career ==
=== Tijuana ===
On 13 January 2017, Lucero made his Liga MX debut against Puebla F.C. ending in a 6–2 win.

=== Universidad de Chile ===
Ended his contract with Brazilian club Fortaleza, Lucero returned to Chile after his stint with Colo-Colo and signed with the classic rival, Universidad de Chile on 20 January 2026.

== Honours ==
Johor Darul Ta'zim

- Malaysia Charity Shield: 2016
- Malaysia FA Cup: 2016
- Malaysia Super League: 2016

Fortaleza

- Campeonato Cearense: 2023
- Copa do Nordeste: 2024

Individual

- PFAM Player of the Month: April 2016
- 2023 Copa do Nordeste top scorer: 6 goals
