= Warley (footballer, born 1999) =

Brazilian footballer

Personal information
- Full name: Warley Leandro da Silva
- Date of birth: 17 September 1999 (age 27)
- Place of birth: Recife, Brazil
- Height: 1.72 m (5 ft 8 in)
- Positions: Right back; winger

Team information
- Current team: Torpedo Kutaisi
- Number: 2

Youth career
- –2019: Santa Cruz

Senior career*
Years	Team	Apps	(Gls)
2019	Santa Cruz	10	(0)
2019	→ CSA (loan)	13	(0)
2020–2021	Botafogo	63	(5)
2022–	Coritiba	26	(1)
2023	→ Ceará (loan)	31	(0)
2024	Mirassol	23	(0)
2024–	Torpedo Kutaisi	38	(1)
- * Club domestic league appearances and goals as of 8 December 2025

Warley Leandro da Silva (born 17 September 1999), simply known as Warley, is a Brazilian footballer who plays as a right back and winger for Erovnuli Liga club Torpedo Kutaisi.

== Career statistics ==
=== Club ===
As of 6 February 2022.

Club	Season	League			State league		Cup		Continental		Other		Total	
Club	Season	Division	Apps	Goals	Apps	Goals	Apps	Goals	Apps	Goals	Apps	Goals	Apps	Goals
Santa Cruz	2019	Série C	8	0	0	0	0	0	—		2 (Note: Appearances in the Copa do Nordeste)	0	10	0
CSA (loan)	2019	Série A	13	0	—		—		—		—		13	0
Botafogo	2020	Série A	16	1	1 (Note: Appearances in the Campeonato Carioca)	0	2 (Note: Appearances in the Copa do Brasil)	0	—		—		19	1
Botafogo	2021	Série B	33	3	13	1	2	1	—		—		48	5
Botafogo	Total		49	4	14	1	4	1	—		—		67	6
Career total			70	4	14	1	4	1	0	0	2	0	90	6

== Honours ==
Botafogo

- Campeonato Brasileiro Série B: 2021

Coritiba

- Campeonato Paranaense: 2022

Ceará

- Copa do Nordeste: 2023
