= Arthur Rezende =

Brazilian footballer (born 1994)

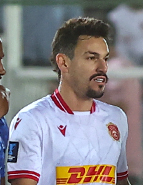
- Rezende with Al-Muharraq in 2025

Personal information
- Full name: Arthur Rodrigues Rezende
- Date of birth: 21 March 1994 (age 32)
- Place of birth: Goiatuba, Brazil
- Height: 1.79 m (5 ft 10 in)
- Position: Midfielder

Youth career
- 2014: Goiás

Senior career*
Years	Team	Apps	(Gls)
2015–2016	Goiás	24	(3)
2016–2017	Gil Vicente	37	(5)
2017	AEL Limassol	11	(0)
2018	Santa Cruz	28	(3)
2018–2020	Boavista	11	(4)
2019	→ Guarani (loan)	30	(4)
2020	→ Bahia (loan)	6	(1)
2020	→ Guarani (loan)	27	(2)
2021–2022	Vila Nova	104	(14)
2023	Ceará	26	(1)
2023–2024	Al-Kholood	31	(9)
2024–2025	Al-Diriyah	25	(8)
- * Club domestic league appearances and goals as of 21:26, 7 February 2023 (UTC)

Arthur Rodrigues Rezende (born 21 March 1994), known as Arthur Rezende, is a Brazilian professional footballer who plays as a midfielder.

== Career ==
Born in Goiatuba, Goiás, Rezende finished his formation with Goiás. In 2015, he was promoted to the main squad, making his senior debuts in the year's Campeonato Goiano.

Rezende became Goiás champion with Goiás in 2015 and 2016.

In 2020 he was Bahia champion with Bahia.

Until May 2022, in all the matches that Rezende scored a goal with the Vila Nova shirt, the team did not leave the field defeated.

Rezende made his Série A debut on 24 May, starting in a 1–0 away win against Palmeiras.

On 11 July 2023, Rezende joined Saudi Arabian club Al-Kholood.

On 21 July 2024, he joined Saudi Second Division side Al-Diriyah.

== Honours ==
Goiás

- Campeonato Goiano: 2015, 2016

Bahia

- Campeonato Baiano: 2020

Ceará

- Copa do Nordeste: 2023
