= Richardson (footballer, born 1991) =

Brazilian footballer

Personal information
- Full name: Richardson Fernandes dos Santos
- Date of birth: 17 August 1991 (age 35)
- Place of birth: Natal, Brazil
- Height: 1.72 m (5 ft 8 in)
- Position: Midfielder

Team information
- Current team: Ceará
- Number: 26

Senior career*
Years	Team	Apps	(Gls)
2010	Flamengo-SP		
2010–2011	América-RN	5	(0)
2012	Baraúnas	11	(0)
2013	Confiança	0	(0)
2013	Treze	5	(0)
2014	Operário-PR	13	(1)
2014–2015	Confiança	29	(1)
2016–2018	Ceará	93	(2)
2019–2021	Kashiwa Reysol	87	(2)
2022–	Ceará	141	(1)
- * Club domestic league appearances and goals as of 18 November 2026

Richardson Fernandes dos Santos (born 17 August 1991), simply known as Richardson is a Brazilian professional footballer who plays for Ceará as a midfielder.

== Club career ==
Born in Natal, Rio Grande do Norte, Richardson made his senior debut with Flamengo-SP in 2010. He went on to represent América-RN (in Série B), Baraúnas and Confiança, before joining Treze on 2 June 2013, in Série C. He was released by the club on 13 August after failing to "meet the expectations of the board and also the supporter".

On 15 January 2014, Richardson moved to Operário-PR. On 4 April, he rejoined Confiança. In his first season, he won promotion to Série C and in the second season, he won Campeonato Sergipano with the club.

On 2 January 2016, Richardson joined Série B club Ceará on a one-year deal. On 5 July, his contract was extended until December 2019. He scored his first league goal in a 1–1 draw against Joinville on 18 June

During the 2017 season, Richardson played both as a right midfielder and a right back, with his side winning the 2017 Campeonato Cearense and achieving promotion to Série A. He went on to captain the side during the campaign in 2018.

On 14 January 2019, Richardson moved abroad and joined Japanese club Kashiwa Reysol.

== Career statistics ==
As of match played 24 November 2024

Appearances and goals by club, season and competition
Club	Season	League			State League		Cup		League Cup		Continental		Other		Total	
Club	Season	Division	Apps	Goals	Apps	Goals	Apps	Goals	Apps	Goals	Apps	Goals	Apps	Goals	Apps	Goals
América-RN	2010	Série B	5	0	0	0	0	0	—		—		—		5	0
América-RN	2011	Série C	0	0	0	0	0	0	—		—		—		0	0
América-RN	Total		5	0	0	0	0	0	—		—		—		5	0
Baraúnas	2012	Série D	11	0	0	0	0	0	—		—		—		11	0
Confiança	2013	Série D	0	0	0	0	3	0	—		—		5 (Note: Appearances in Copa do Nordeste)	0	8	0
Treze	2013	Série C	5	0	—		0	0	—		—		—		5	0
Operário-PR	2014	Paranaense A1	—		13	1	—		—		—		—		13	1
Confiança	2014	Série D	11	0	7	0	0	0	—		—		—		18	0
Confiança	2015	Série C	18	1	12	0	2	0	—		—		5	0	37	1
Confiança	Total		29	1	19	0	2	0	—		—		5	0	55	1
Ceará	2016	Série B	34	1	9	3	4	0	—		—		3	0	50	4
Ceará	2017	Série B	29	1	12	1	1	0	—		—		3 (Note: Appearances in Primeira Liga)	0	45	2
Ceará	2018	Série A	30	0	9	0	4	0	—		—		6	1	49	1
Ceará	Total		93	2	30	4	9	0	—		—		12	1	144	7
Kashiwa Reysol	2019	J2 League	35	1	—		1	0	2	0	—		—		38	1
Kashiwa Reysol	2020	J1 League	27	1	—		—		3	0	—		—		30	1
Kashiwa Reysol	2021	J1 League	25	0	—		2	0	5	0	—		—		32	0
Kashiwa Reysol	Total		87	2	—		3	0	10	0	—		—		100	2
Ceará	2022	Série A	31	0	2	0	4	0	—		8	1	6	0	51	1
Ceará	2023	Série B	25	0	6	0	2	0	—		—		9	0	42	0
Ceará	2024	Série B	25	0	7	1	1	0	—		—		7	0	40	1
Ceará	Total		81	0	15	1	7	0	—		8	1	22	0	133	2
Career total			311	5	77	6	24	0	10	0	8	1	34	1	464	13

== Honours ==
Confiança

- Campeonato Sergipano: 2015

Ceará

- Campeonato Cearense: 2017, 2018, 2024, 2025
- Copa do Nordeste: 2023

Kashiwa Reysol

- J2 League: 2019
