= Luiz Otávio (footballer, born 1988) =

Brazilian footballer

Personal information
- Full name: Luiz Otávio Anacleto Leandro
- Date of birth: 14 September 1988 (age 38)
- Place of birth: Carmo, Brazil
- Height: 1.90 m (6 ft 3 in)
- Position: Centre back

Team information
- Current team: Ceará
- Number: 13

Youth career
- Botafogo

Senior career*
Years	Team	Apps	(Gls)
2008	Friburguense	0	(0)
2009–2018	Angra dos Reis	4	(0)
2010–2011	→ Madureira (loan)	22	(0)
2012	→ Macaé (loan)	2	(0)
2013	→ Icasa (loan)	55	(5)
2014	→ Linense (loan)	4	(0)
2014–2016	→ Sampaio Corrêa (loan)	113	(4)
2017–2018	→ Ceará (loan)	43	(3)
2019–	Ceará	282	(11)
- * Club domestic league appearances and goals as of 18 November 2026

Luiz Otávio Anacleto Leandro (born 14 September 1988), known as Luiz Otávio, is a Brazilian footballer who plays for Ceará as a central defender.

== Club career ==
Born in Carmo, Rio de Janeiro, Luiz Otávio graduated from the youth academy of Botafogo and turned professional with Friburguense in 2008. In 2009, he joined local Angra dos Reis Esporte Clube, and initially spent loan at lower tier clubs - Madureira, Macaé before joining Série B club Icasa in 2013. On 28 May, he scored his first goal for the club in a 1−1 draw against América-RN.

After a short stint with Clube Atlético Linense, Luiz Otávio was loaned to Sampaio Corrêa on 8 April 2014. On 18 November, he scored his first goal for the club in a 2−0 victory against Santa Cruz Futebol Clube. In the 2016 season, he started in 32 matches with the club being relegated to the third tier.

On 7 December 2016, Luiz Otávio joined Ceará on loan for the 2017 season. He made a total of 44 appearances and scored thrice, with his club winning promotion to Série A.

On 13 December 2017, Luiz Otávio renewed his contract with Angra dos Reis until 2021, and was loaned back to Ceará. On 31 December 2018, his contract was extended until 2021, and the club bought 75% of his economic rights for a fee of R$ 1 million.

== Club statistics ==
As of 25 October 2021

Club	Season	League			State League		Cup		Continental		Other		Total	
Club	Season	Division	Apps	Goals	Apps	Goals	Apps	Goals	Apps	Goals	Apps	Goals	Apps	Goals
Friburguense	2008	Carioca	—		0	0	—		—		0	0	0	0
Angra dos Reis	2009	Carioca Série B	—		6	0	—		—		—		6	0
Angra dos Reis	2012	Carioca Série B	—		0	0	—		—		6 (Note: Appearance(s) in Copa Rio)	0	6	0
Angra dos Reis	Total		—		6	0	—		—		6	0	12	0
Madureira (loan)	2010	Série D	1	0	0	0	—		—		6	0	7	0
Madureira (loan)	2011	Série C	4	0	14	0	—		—		11	0	29	0
Madureira (loan)	Total		5	0	14	0	—		—		17	0	36	0
Macaé (loan)	2012	Série C	0	0	2	0	—		—		—		2	0
Icasa (loan)	2013	Série B	30	1	25	4	—		—		—		55	5
Linense (loan)	2014	Paulista	—		4	0	—		—		—		4	0
Sampaio Corrêa (loan)	2014	Série B	19	1	—		0	0	—		—		19	1
Sampaio Corrêa (loan)	2015	Série B	29	0	6	0	4	0	—		5 (Note: Appearance(s) in Copa do Nordeste)	1	44	1
Sampaio Corrêa (loan)	2016	Série B	32	1	11	0	2	0	—		5	1	50	2
Sampaio Corrêa (loan)	Total		80	2	17	0	6	0	—		10	2	113	4
Ceará	2017	Série B	31	1	9	2	1	0	—		2 (Note: Appearance(s) in Primeira Liga)	0	43	3
Ceará	2018	Série A	35	1	7	0	4	0	—		8	0	54	1
Ceará	2019	Série A	26	2	8	0	4	0	—		6	0	44	2
Ceará	2020	Série A	28	1	6	0	10	1	—		10	0	54	2
Ceará	2021	Série A	12	0	2	0	0	0	4 (Note: Appearance(s) in Copa Sudamericana)	0	10	1	28	1
Ceará	Total		132	5	32	2	19	1	4	0	36	1	223	9
Career total			247	8	100	6	25	1	4	0	69	3	445	18

== Honours ==
Sampaio Corrêa

- Super Copa Maranhão: 2015

Ceará

- Campeonato Cearense: 2017, 2018
- Copa do Nordeste: 2020, 2023
