= Caíque (footballer, born 1995) =

Brazilian footballer

Personal information
- Full name: Caíque de Jesus Gonçalves
- Date of birth: 10 October 1995 (age 31)
- Place of birth: Guarulhos, Brazil
- Height: 1.78 m (5 ft 10 in)
- Position: Defensive midfielder

Team information
- Current team: Vitória
- Number: 95

Youth career
- 2013–2015: Portuguesa

Senior career*
Years	Team	Apps	(Gls)
2015–2016	Portuguesa	25	(0)
2018–2020	Ferroviária	8	(0)
2019	→ Sertãozinho (loan)	9	(0)
2020–2021	Portuguesa	43	(1)
2022	Água Santa	10	(1)
2022	Ituano	27	(0)
2023	Ceará	29	(0)
2024–2025	Juventude	57	(0)
2026–	Vitória	11	(0)
- * Club domestic league appearances and goals as of 8 April 2026

Caíque de Jesus Gonçalves (born 10 October 1995), known as Caíque Gonçalves or just Caíque, is a Brazilian footballer who plays as a defensive midfielder for Vitória.

== Career ==
Born in Guarulhos, São Paulo, Caíque began his career on Portuguesa, having joined their youth sides at the age of 17. On 12 February 2015, he was included in the 28-man list for the year's Campeonato Paulista.

Caíque made his senior debut on 4 March 2015, coming on as a second half substitute for Léo Costa in a 3–1 Copa do Brasil away win against Santos-AP. He made his Paulistão debut seventeen days later, again from the bench in a 1–1 away draw against Mogi Mirim.

Rarely used during his first year, Caíque became a regular starter in the 2016 Campeonato Paulista Série A2, and suffered relegation from the Série C at the end of the year.

On 5 December 2017, after spending a period in Portugal with Portimonense, Caíque was presented at Ferroviária. Rarely used in his first season, he was loaned to Sertãozinho for the 2019 Paulistão A2 before returning to AFE for the 2019 Série D, and scored his first senior goal with the side on 18 May 2019, in a 2–0 away win over Maringá.

On 14 November 2019, Caíque returned to Lusa for the upcoming season. An immediate first-choice, he helped the club to win the Copa Paulista in 2020.

On 1 November 2021, Caíque agreed to a pre-contract with Água Santa and left Portuguesa. On 21 April 2022, he signed for Série B side Ituano.

On 8 December 2022, Caíque joined Ceará also in the second division. He won the 2023 Copa do Nordeste with the club, but left on 28 November 2023.

On 15 December 2023, Caíque signed a one-year contract with Juventude, newly promoted to the Série A.

== Career statistics ==
As of 4 April 2024.

Club	Season	League			State League		Cup		Continental		Other		Total	
Club	Season	Division	Apps	Goals	Apps	Goals	Apps	Goals	Apps	Goals	Apps	Goals	Apps	Goals
Portuguesa	2015	Série C	0	0	2	0	1	0	—		—		3	0
Portuguesa	2016	Série C	9	0	14	0	1	0	—		—		24	0
Portuguesa	Total		9	0	16	0	2	0	—		—		27	0
Ferroviária	2018	Série D	4	0	4	0	—		—		8 (Note: Appearance(s) in Copa Paulista)	1	16	1
Ferroviária	2019	Série D	5	1	—		—		—		17	0	22	1
Ferroviária	Total		9	1	4	0	—		—		25	1	38	2
Sertãozinho (loan)	2019	Paulista A2	—		9	0	—		—		—		9	0
Portuguesa	2020	Paulista A2	—		14	0	—		—		12	1	26	1
Portuguesa	2021	Série D	14	1	15	0	—		—		—		29	1
Portuguesa	Total		14	1	29	0	—		—		12	1	55	2
Água Santa	2022	Paulista	—		10	1	—		—		—		10	1
Ituano	2022	Série B	27	0	—		—		—		—		27	0
Ceará	2023	Série B	20	0	9	0	2	0	—		9 (Note: Appearance(s) in Copa do Nordeste)	1	40	1
Juventude	2024	Série A	0	0	11	0	2	0	—		—		13	0
Career total			79	2	88	1	6	0	0	0	46	2	219	5

== Honours ==
Portuguesa

- Copa Paulista: 2020

Ceará

- Copa do Nordeste: 2023
