= David Ricardo (footballer) =

Brazilian footballer (born 2002)

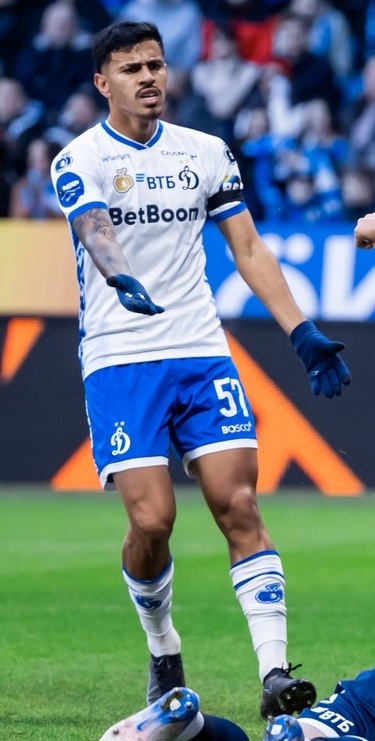
- David Ricardo with Dynamo Moscow in 2026

Personal information
- Full name: David Ricardo Loiola da Silva
- Date of birth: 21 December 2002 (age 23)
- Place of birth: Teresina, Brazil
- Height: 1.88 m (6 ft 2 in)
- Position: Centre-back

Team information
- Current team: Dynamo Moscow
- Number: 57

Youth career
- Altos
- Fluminense-PI
- 2022: → Ceará (loan)

Senior career*
Years	Team	Apps	(Gls)
2021–2022	Fluminense-PI	9	(0)
2022	→ Ceará (loan)	5	(0)
2023–2024	Ceará	80	(4)
2025–2026	Botafogo	24	(1)
2026–	Dynamo Moscow	22	(0)
- * Club domestic league appearances and goals as of 22 November 2026

David Ricardo Loiola da Silva (born 21 December 2002), known as David Ricardo, is a Brazilian footballer who plays for Russian Premier League club Dynamo Moscow. Mainly a centre-back, he can also play as a left-back.

== Career ==
=== Fluminense-PI ===
Born in Teresina, Piauí, David Ricardo played for local schools in his hometown before joining the youth sides of Altos. He later moved to Fluminense-PI, and made his first team debut during the 2021 Campeonato Piauiense.

=== Ceará ===
In March 2022, David Ricardo moved to Ceará on loan, being initially assigned to the under-20 squad. He made his first team debut for Vozão on 11 May, coming on as a second-half substitute for Gabriel Lacerda in a 2–0 home win over Tombense, for the year's Copa do Brasil.

David Ricardo made his Série A debut on 5 October 2022, replacing Lucas Ribeiro in a 1–1 home draw against Goiás. On 30 December, Fluminense confirmed his permanent transfer to Ceará, after the club paid R$ 400,000 for 50% of his economic rights.

David Ricardo began the 2023 season as a starter, and scored his first goal for the club on 31 January of that year, netting the opener in a 1–1 Campeonato Cearense away draw against Ferroviário. On 9 April 2024, after becoming an undisputed first-choice, the club bought a further 40% of his economic rights.

=== Botafogo ===
On 5 February 2025, Botafogo announced the signing of David Ricardo on a four-year contract.

=== Dynamo Moscow ===
On 21 January 2026, David Ricardo signed a four-and-a-half-year contract with Russian club Dynamo Moscow.

== Career statistics ==
As of 22 November 2026

Club	Season	League			State League		Cup		Continental		Other		Total	
Club	Season	Division	Apps	Goals	Apps	Goals	Apps	Goals	Apps	Goals	Apps	Goals	Apps	Goals
Fluminense-PI	2021	Piauiense	—		7	0	—		—		1 (Note: Appearance(s) in Copa do Nordeste)	1	8	1
Fluminense-PI	2022	Série D	0	0	2	0	0	0	—		0	0	2	0
Fluminense-PI	Total		0	0	9	0	0	0	—		1	1	10	1
Ceará	2022	Série A	5	0	—		1	0	0	0	—		6	0
Ceará	2023	Série B	30	1	6	1	2	0	—		9	1	47	3
Ceará	2024	Série B	33	1	6	1	1	0	—		6	1	46	3
Ceará	Total		68	2	12	2	4	0	0	0	15	2	99	6
Botafogo	2025	Série A	22	1	2	0	2	0	3 (Note: Appearances in Copa Libertadores)	0	—		29	1
Dynamo Moscow	2025–26	Russian Premier League	7	0	—		4	1	—		—		11	1
Dynamo Moscow	2026–27	Russian Premier League	15	0	—		2	0	—		—		17	0
Dynamo Moscow	Total		22	0	0	0	6	1	0	0	0	0	28	1
Career total			112	3	23	2	12	1	3	0	16	3	166	9

== Honours ==
Fluminense-PI

- Campeonato Piauiense: 2022

Ceará

- Copa do Nordeste: 2023
- Campeonato Cearense: 2024
