= Guilherme Castilho =

Brazilian footballer (born 1999)

Personal information
- Full name: Guilherme Castilho Carvalho
- Date of birth: 19 September 1999 (age 27)
- Place of birth: Arapoema, Brazil
- Height: 1.75 m (5 ft 9 in)
- Position: Midfielder

Team information
- Current team: Juárez
- Number: 8

Youth career
- –2020: Mirassol
- 2019–2020: → Atlético Mineiro (loan)

Senior career*
Years	Team	Apps	(Gls)
2017–2021	Mirassol	12	(0)
2019–2020	→ Atlético Mineiro (loan)	0	(0)
2020–2021	→ Confiança (loan)	23	(1)
2021–2022	Atlético Mineiro	8	(0)
2021	→ Juventude (loan)	44	(7)
2022–2024	Ceará	39	(2)
2024	→ Juventude (loan)	0	(0)
2024	→ Juárez (loan)	12	(1)
2025–	Juárez	7	(1)
- * Club domestic league appearances and goals as of 27 October 2023

Guilherme Castilho Carvalho (born 19 September 1999) is a Brazilian footballer who plays for as a midfielder for Liga MX club Juárez.

== Career statistics ==
=== Club ===
As of 27 July 2022

Club	Season	League			State league		Cup		Continental		Other		Total	
Club	Season	Division	Apps	Goals	Apps	Goals	Apps	Goals	Apps	Goals	Apps	Goals	Apps	Goals
Mirassol	2017	—			1 (Note: Appearance(s) in Campeonato Paulista)	0	—		—		18 (Note: Appearances in Copa Paulista)	2	19	2
Mirassol	2018	Série D	6	0	5	0	—		—		15	0	26	0
Mirassol	Total		6	0	6	0	—		—		33	2	45	2
Atlético Mineiro (loan)	2019	Série A	0	0	0	0	0	0	0	0	—		0	0
Atlético Mineiro (loan)	2020	Série A	0	0	0	0	0	0	0	0	—		0	0
Atlético Mineiro (loan)	Total		0	0	0	0	0	0	0	0	—		0	0
Confiança (loan)	2020	Série B	23	1	—		—		—		—		23	1
Atlético Mineiro	2021	Série A	0	0	0	0	0	0	0	0	—		0	0
Atlético Mineiro	2022	Série A	4	0	4 (Note: Appearance(s) in Campeonato Mineiro)	0	2	0	0	0	0	0	10	0
Atlético Mineiro	Total		4	0	4	0	2	0	0	0	0	0	10	0
Juventude (loan)	2021	Série A	33	4	11 (Note: Appearance(s) in Campeonato Gaúcho)	3	2	1	—		—		46	8
Ceará	2022	Série A	0	0	—		—		0	0	—		0	0
Career total			66	5	21	3	4	1	0	0	33	2	124	11

== Honours ==
Atlético Mineiro

- Supercopa do Brasil: 2022
- Campeonato Mineiro: 2022

Ceará

- Copa do Nordeste: 2023
- Campeonato Cearense: 2024
