= Erick (footballer, born December 1997) =

Erick de Arruda Serafim

Personal information
- Full name: Erick de Arruda Serafim
- Date of birth: 10 December 1997 (age 28)
- Place of birth: Recife, Brazil
- Height: 1.73 m (5 ft 8 in)
- Position: Forward

Team information
- Current team: Vitória
- Number: 33

Youth career
- 2013–2014: Santos
- 2014–2017: Náutico

Senior career*
Years	Team	Apps	(Gls)
2017	Náutico	32	(6)
2017–2021	Braga	0	(0)
2017–2021	Braga B	11	(0)
2018–2019	→ Vitória (loan)	26	(3)
2019	→ Gil Vicente (loan)	8	(0)
2020–2021	→ Náutico (loan)	60	(14)
2021–2023	Ceará	80	(15)
2024–2025	São Paulo	35	(2)
2025	→ Vitória (loan)	31	(3)
2026–	Vitória	15	(2)
- * Club domestic league appearances and goals as of 8 April 2026

Erick de Arruda Serafim (born 10 December 1997), simply known as Erick, is a Brazilian professional footballer who plays as a forward for Vitória.

== Honours ==
Náutico

- Campeonato Pernambucano: 2021

Ceará

- Copa do Nordeste: 2023

São Paulo

- Supercopa do Brasil: 2024

== Professional career ==
Erick made his professional debut with Náutico in a 0-0 Campeonato Brasileiro Série B tie with América Mineiro on 12 May 2017. On 29 August 2017, Erick signed with S.C. Braga for 4 seasons.
