= 2023 Copa do Nordeste =

Tournament details
- Country: Brazil
- Dates: 21 January – 3 May
- Teams: 16

Final positions
- Champions: Ceará (3rd title)
- Runners-up: Sport
- 2024 Copa do Brasil: Ceará

Tournament statistics
- Matches played: 72
- Goals scored: 198 (2.75 per match)
- Top goal scorer(s): Three players (5 goals each)
- All statistics correct as of 3 May 2023.

The 2023 Copa do Nordeste was the 20th edition of the main football tournament featuring teams from the Brazilian Northeast Region. The competition features 16 clubs, with Bahia, Ceará and Pernambuco having two seeds each, and Alagoas, Maranhão, Paraíba, Piauí, Rio Grande do Norte and Sergipe with one seed each. Four teams were decided by a qualifying tournament (Eliminatórias Copa do Nordeste 2023). The Copa do Nordeste began on 21 January and ended on 3 May 2023.

Fortaleza are the defending champions.

== Format ==
In this season, 12 teams (9 state league champions and best placed teams in the 2022 CBF ranking from Ceará, Bahia and Pernambuco) gained direct entries into the group stage while the other four berths were decided by the Eliminatórias Copa do Nordeste.

For the group stage, the 16 teams were drawn into two groups. Each team will play once against the eight clubs from the other group. Top four teams will qualify for the final stages. Quarter-finals and semi-finals will be played on a single-leg basis and finals will be played on a home-and-away two-legged basis.

== Qualification ==
The 2023 Copa do Nordeste qualification (officially the Eliminatórias Copa do Nordeste 2023) was the qualifying tournament of the 2023 Copa do Nordeste. It was played from 5 to 8 January 2023. Sixteen teams competed to decide four places in the Copa do Nordeste. The teams entered in two rounds where the four winners advanced to the Copa do Nordeste.

The winners were CSA (Alagoas), Ferroviário (Ceará), Santa Cruz (Pernambuco) and Vitória (Bahia).

== Teams ==
The qualified teams are

| Association | Team | Qualification method |
|---|---|---|
| (Alagoas) Alagoas; 1 + 1 berths | CRB | 2022 Campeonato Alagoano champions |
| (Alagoas) Alagoas; 1 + 1 berths | CSA | 2023 Copa do Nordeste qualification |
| (Bahia) Bahia; 2 + 1 berths | Atlético de Alagoinhas | 2022 Campeonato Baiano champions |
| (Bahia) Bahia; 2 + 1 berths | Bahia | best placed team in the 2022 CBF ranking not already qualified |
| (Bahia) Bahia; 2 + 1 berths | Vitória | 2023 Copa do Nordeste qualification |
| (Ceará) Ceará; 2 + 1 berths | Fortaleza | 2022 Campeonato Cearense champions |
| (Ceará) Ceará; 2 + 1 berths | Ceará | best placed team in the 2022 CBF ranking not already qualified |
| (Ceará) Ceará; 2 + 1 berths | Ferroviário | 2023 Copa do Nordeste qualification |
| (Maranhão) Maranhão; 1 berth | Sampaio Corrêa | 2022 Campeonato Maranhense champions |
| (Paraíba) Paraíba; 1 berth | Campinense | 2022 Campeonato Paraibano champions |
| (Pernambuco) Pernambuco; 2 + 1 berths | Náutico | 2022 Campeonato Pernambucano champions |
| (Pernambuco) Pernambuco; 2 + 1 berths | Sport | best placed team in the 2022 CBF ranking not already qualified |
| (Pernambuco) Pernambuco; 2 + 1 berths | Santa Cruz | 2023 Copa do Nordeste qualification |
| (Piauí) Piauí; 1 berth | Fluminense-PI | 2022 Campeonato Piauiense champions |
| (Rio Grande do Norte) Rio Grande do Norte; 1 berth | ABC | 2022 Campeonato Potiguar champions |
| (Sergipe) Sergipe; 1 berth | Sergipe | 2022 Campeonato Sergipano champions |

== Schedule ==
The schedule of the competition is as follows.

| Stage | First leg | Second leg |
|---|---|---|
| Group Stage | Round 1: 22 January | |
| Group Stage | Round 2: 5 February | |
| Group Stage | Round 3: 15 February | |
| Group Stage | Round 4: 18 February | |
| Group Stage | Round 5: 22 February and 1 March | |
| Group Stage | Round 6: 5 March | |
| Group Stage | Round 7: 8 and 15 March | |
| Group Stage | Round 8: 22 March | |
| Quarter-finals | 26 March | |
| Semi-finals | 29 March | |
| Finals | 19 April | 3 May |

== Draw ==
The draw for the group stage was held on 21 November 2022, 15:30, at the CBF headquarters in Rio de Janeiro. The teams (excluding the four teams from the qualification tournament) were seeded into three pots based on the 2022 CBF ranking (shown in parentheses). They were drawn into two groups of eight containing two teams from each of the three pots with the restriction that teams from the same federation could not be drawn into the same group.

Group stage draw
| Pot 1 | Pot 2 | Pot 3 |
|---|---|---|
| (Ceará) Fortaleza (11); Bahia (12); Ceará (13); (Pernambuco) Sport (21) | (Alagoas) CRB (28); (Maranhão) Sampaio Corrêa (32); (Pernambuco) Náutico (38); (Rio Grande do Norte) ABC (47) | (Paraíba) Campinense (72); Sergipe (90); (Bahia) Atlético de Alagoinhas (97); (Piauí) Fluminense-PI (no rank) |

The four teams from the qualification tournament will be drawn according to the position of their federation in the CBF state ranking with the restriction that teams from the same federation can not be drawn into the same group. If there are three or more qualified teams from the same federation, the two best teams in the CBF ranking will be allocated in different groups.

== Group stage ==
For the group stage, the 16 teams were drawn into two groups of eight teams each. Each team will play on a single round-robin tournament against the eight clubs from the other group. The top four teams of each group will advance to the quarter-finals of the knockout stages. The teams will be ranked according to points (3 points for a win, 1 point for a draw, and 0 points for a loss). If tied on points, the following criteria will be used to determine the ranking: 1. Wins; 2. Goal difference; 3. Goals scored; 4. Fewest red cards; 5. Fewest yellow cards; 6. Draw in the headquarters of the Brazilian Football Confederation (Regulations Article 13).

=== Group A ===
| Pos | Team | Pld | W | D | L | GF | GA | GD | Pts | Qualification |
|---|---|---|---|---|---|---|---|---|---|---|
| 1 | (Pernambuco) Sport | 8 | 6 | 1 | 1 | 19 | 5 | +14 | 19 | Advance to Quarter-finals |
| 2 | (Ceará) Fortaleza | 8 | 6 | 0 | 2 | 15 | 5 | +10 | 18 | Advance to Quarter-finals |
| 3 | (Ceará) Ferroviário | 8 | 3 | 4 | 1 | 15 | 11 | +4 | 13 | Advance to Quarter-finals |
| 4 | (Alagoas) CRB | 8 | 3 | 4 | 1 | 7 | 7 | 0 | 13 | Advance to Quarter-finals |
| 5 | (Maranhão) Sampaio Corrêa | 8 | 2 | 3 | 3 | 7 | 11 | −4 | 9 | |
| 6 | (Bahia) Atlético de Alagoinhas | 8 | 2 | 0 | 6 | 6 | 16 | −10 | 6 | |
| 7 | (Bahia) Vitória | 8 | 1 | 3 | 4 | 10 | 13 | −3 | 6 | |
| 8 | (Piauí) Fluminense-PI | 8 | 0 | 3 | 5 | 7 | 18 | −11 | 3 | |

Source: CBF

=== Group B ===
| Pos | Team | Pld | W | D | L | GF | GA | GD | Pts | Qualification |
|---|---|---|---|---|---|---|---|---|---|---|
| 1 | Ceará | 8 | 5 | 1 | 2 | 16 | 11 | +5 | 16 | Advance to Quarter-finals |
| 2 | (Rio Grande do Norte) ABC | 8 | 4 | 2 | 2 | 13 | 6 | +7 | 14 | Advance to Quarter-finals |
| 3 | (Pernambuco) Náutico | 8 | 4 | 1 | 3 | 12 | 11 | +1 | 13 | Advance to Quarter-finals |
| 4 | Sergipe | 8 | 3 | 2 | 3 | 12 | 8 | +4 | 11 | Advance to Quarter-finals |
| 5 | (Pernambuco) Santa Cruz | 8 | 2 | 3 | 3 | 10 | 13 | −3 | 9 | |
| 6 | Bahia | 8 | 2 | 3 | 3 | 9 | 15 | −6 | 9 | |
| 7 | (Paraíba) Campinense | 8 | 2 | 2 | 4 | 8 | 12 | −4 | 8 | |
| 8 | (Alagoas) CSA | 8 | 1 | 4 | 3 | 6 | 10 | −4 | 7 | |

Source: CBF

=== Results ===
| Home \ Away | ABC | BAH | CAM | CEA | CSA | NAU | SAN | SER |
|---|---|---|---|---|---|---|---|---|
| (Bahia) Atlético de Alagoinhas | | 1–2 | 2–1 | | 1–0 | 0–1 | | |
| (Alagoas) CRB | 1–0 | | | 1–1 | | | 2–1 | 1–0 |
| (Ceará) Ferroviário | 2–2 | | | 3–0 | | | 2–1 | 0–0 |
| (Piauí) Fluminense-PI | | 1–1 | 1–2 | 2–5 | 0–0 | | | |
| (Ceará) Fortaleza | | | 2–0 | | 3–0 | 2–1 | | 1–0 |
| (Maranhão) Sampaio Corrêa | | 1–0 | 1–1 | | 1–1 | 1–0 | | |
| (Pernambuco) Sport | 2–0 | 6–0 | | | | | 0–0 | 2–1 |
| (Bahia) Vitória | 1–1 | | | 2–0 | | 2–3 | 1–1 | |

| Home \ Away | ATL | CRB | FER | FLU | FOR | SAM | SPO | VIT |
|---|---|---|---|---|---|---|---|---|
| (Rio Grande do Norte) ABC | 3–0 | | | 3–0 | 2–0 | 2–0 | | |
| Bahia | | 3–0 | 2–2 | | 0–3 | | | 1–1 |
| (Paraíba) Campinense | | 0–0 | 2–3 | | | | 0–2 | 2–1 |
| Ceará | 3–1 | | | | 2–0 | 2–0 | 3–2 | |
| (Alagoas) CSA | | 0–0 | 1–1 | | | | 1–3 | 3–1 |
| (Pernambuco) Náutico | | 2–2 | 3–2 | 2–0 | | | 0–2 | |
| (Pernambuco) Santa Cruz | 2–1 | | | 2–2 | 0–4 | 3–1 | | |
| Sergipe | 4–0 | | | 3–1 | | 2–2 | | 2–1 |

Source:CBF
Legend: Blue = home team win; Yellow = draw; Red = away team win.

== Final stages ==
Starting from the quarter-finals, the teams played a single-elimination tournament with the following rules:

- Quarter-finals and semi-finals were played on a single-leg basis, with the higher-seeded team hosting the leg.
  - If tied, the penalty shoot-out would be used to determine the winners (Regulations Article 17).
- Finals were played on a home-and-away two-legged basis, with the higher-seeded team hosting the second leg.
  - If tied on aggregate, the penalty shoot-out would be used to determine the winners (Regulations Article 17).
- Extra time would not be played and away goals rule would not be used in final stages.

Starting from the semi-finals, the teams were seeded according to their performance in the tournament. The teams were ranked according to overall points. If tied on overall points, the following criteria would be used to determine the ranking: 1. Overall wins; 2. Overall goal difference; 3. Overall goals scored; 4. Fewest red cards in the tournament; 5. Fewest yellow cards in the tournament; 6. Draw in the headquarters of the Brazilian Football Confederation (Regulations Article 18).

=== Bracket ===
Quarter-finals
(Ceará) | Fortaleza | 4
(Ceará) | Ferroviário | 0
(Ceará) | Ceará | 3
(Sergipe) | Sergipe | 1
(Pernambuco) | Sport | 4
(Alagoas) | CRB | 0
(Rio Grande do Norte) | ABC | 3
(Pernambuco) | Náutico | 1

Semi-finals
(Ceará) | Fortaleza | 2
(Ceará) | Ceará | 3
(Pernambuco) | Sport | 1
(Rio Grande do Norte) | ABC | 0

Finals
(Ceará) | Ceará (p) | 2 | 0 | 2 (4)
(Pernambuco) | Sport | 1 | 1 | 2 (2)

=== Quarter-finals ===
| Team 1 | Score | Team 2 |
|---|---|---|
| Sport (Pernambuco) | 4–0 | (Alagoas) CRB |
| ABC (Rio Grande do Norte) | 3–1 | (Pernambuco) Náutico |
| Ceará | 3–1 | Sergipe |
| Fortaleza (Ceará) | 4–0 | (Ceará) Ferroviário |

==== Group C ====
26 March 2023
18:00

| Sport (Pernambuco) | 4–0 | (Alagoas) CRB |
|---|---|---|
| Jorginho 32'; Luciano Juba 58'; Igor Cariús 77'; Edinho 87' | Report |

Estádio Ilha do Retiro, Recife
Referee: Diego Pombo Lopez (Bahia)

==== Group D ====
26 March 2023
15:30

| ABC (Rio Grande do Norte) | 3–1 | (Pernambuco) Náutico |
|---|---|---|
| Felipe Garcia 13', 77'; Souza 45+3' (o.g.) | Report | Tagarela 87' |

Frasqueirão, Natal
Referee: Léo Simão Holanda (Ceará)

==== Group E ====
26 March 2023
18:00

| Ceará | 3–1 | Sergipe |
|---|---|---|
| Erick 16'; Álvaro 45+2'; Luvannor 90' | Report | Pedro Henrique 38' |

Castelão, Fortaleza
Referee: Caio Max Augusto Vieira (Rio Grande do Norte)

==== Group F ====
25 March 2023
16:30

| Fortaleza (Ceará) | 4–0 | (Ceará) Ferroviário |
|---|---|---|
| Lucero 4', 6'; Hércules 43'; Thiago Galhardo 71' | Report |

Castelão, Fortaleza
Referee: Rodrigo José Pereira de Lima (Pernambuco)

=== Semi-finals ===
| Pos | Team | Pld | W | D | L | GF | GA | GD | Pts | Host |
|---|---|---|---|---|---|---|---|---|---|---|
| 1 | (Pernambuco) Sport | 9 | 7 | 1 | 1 | 23 | 5 | +18 | 22 | Host |
| 4 | (Rio Grande do Norte) ABC | 9 | 5 | 2 | 2 | 16 | 7 | +9 | 17 | |
| 2 | (Ceará) Fortaleza | 9 | 7 | 0 | 2 | 19 | 5 | +14 | 21 | Host |
| 3 | Ceará | 9 | 6 | 1 | 2 | 19 | 12 | +7 | 19 | |

Source: CBF

| Team 1 | Score | Team 2 |
|---|---|---|
| Sport (Pernambuco) | 1–0 | (Rio Grande do Norte) ABC |
| Fortaleza (Ceará) | 2–3 | Ceará |

==== Group G ====
29 March 2023^{a}
21:30

| Sport (Pernambuco) | 1–0 | (Rio Grande do Norte) ABC |
|---|---|---|
| Vágner Love 1' | Report |

Estádio Ilha do Retiro, Recife
Referee: Dênis da Silva Ribeiro Serafim (Alagoas)

a. Match suspended in the 61st minute due to rain. The remaining 29 minutes were played on 30 March 2023 at 19:00.

==== Group H ====
29 March 2023
21:30

| Fortaleza (Ceará) | 2–3 | Ceará |
|---|---|---|
| Calebe 30'; Lucero 63' | Report | Erick 12' (pen.); Caíque 33'; Titi 46' (o.g.) |

Castelão, Fortaleza
Referee: Marcelo de Lima Henrique (Ceará)

=== Finals ===
| Pos | Team | Pld | W | D | L | GF | GA | GD | Pts | Host |
|---|---|---|---|---|---|---|---|---|---|---|
| 1 | (Pernambuco) Sport | 10 | 8 | 1 | 1 | 24 | 5 | +19 | 25 | 2nd leg |
| 2 | Ceará | 10 | 7 | 1 | 2 | 22 | 14 | +8 | 22 | 1st leg |

Source: CBF

| Team 1 | Agg. | Team 2 | 1st leg | 2nd leg |
|---|---|---|---|---|
| Ceará | 2–2 (4–2 p) | (Pernambuco) Sport | 2–1 | 0–1 |

==== Group I ====
19 April 2023
21:30

| Ceará | 2–1 | (Pernambuco) Sport |
|---|---|---|
| Guilherme Castilho 1'; Vitor Gabriel 45' | Report | David Ricardo 90+7' (o.g.) |

Castelão, Fortaleza
Referee: Caio Max Augusto Vieira (Rio Grande do Norte)

3 May 2023
21:00

| Sport (Pernambuco) | 1–0 | Ceará |
|---|---|---|
| Luciano Juba 26' | Report |
Penalties
| Luciano Juba (penalty missed); Vágner Love (penalty scored); Sabino (penalty scored); Gabriel Santos (penalty missed) | 2–4 | (penalty scored) Danilo Barcelos; (penalty scored) Jean Carlos; (penalty missed) Guilherme Castilho; (penalty scored) Luvannor; (penalty scored) Erick |

Estádio Ilha do Retiro, Recife
Referee: Dênis da Silva Ribeiro Serafim (Alagoas)

2023 Copa do Nordeste
Champions

Ceará
3rd title
