= 2025 Fortaleza Esporte Clube season =

Fortaleza Esporte Clube
2025 season
- Manager: Juan Pablo Vojvoda (until 14 July); Renato Paiva (17 July–2 September); Martín Palermo (since 3 September)
- Stadium: Castelão
- Série A: 18th (relegated)
- Campeonato Cearense: Runner-up
- Copa do Brasil: Third Round
- Copa do Nordeste: Quarter-finals
- Copa Libertadores: Round of 16
- Top goalscorer: League: Adam Bareiro; Deyverson (7 each); All: Juan Martín Lucero (11)
- Average home league attendance: 27,066
Home colours	Away colours	Third colours

The 2025 season was the 107th season in the history of Fortaleza Esporte Clube and 7th consecutive in Brazil's top division Série A. The club also participated in the Campeonato Cearense, Copa do Brasil, Copa do Nordeste, and Copa Libertadores.

== Squad ==
=== Current squad ===
As of 28 February 2025

Note: Flags indicate national team as defined under FIFA eligibility rules; some limited exceptions apply. Players may hold more than one non-FIFA nationality.

No.	Pos.	Nation	Player
1	GK	BRA	João Ricardo
2	DF	BRA	Tinga (captain)
4	DF	BRA	Titi (vice-captain)
5	MF	ARG	Pol Fernández
6	DF	BRA	Bruno Pacheco
7	MF	ARG	Tomás Pochettino
8	MF	ARG	Emmanuel Martínez
9	FW	ARG	Juan Martín Lucero (4th captain)
10	MF	BRA	Calebe
11	FW	BRA	Marinho
12	GK	BRA	Brenno
13	DF	CHI	Benjamín Kuscevic
14	DF	ARG	Eros Mancuso
15	GK	BRA	Magrão
16	DF	BRA	Diogo Barbosa
17	MF	BRA	Zé Welison

No.	Pos.	Nation	Player
20	MF	BRA	Matheus Rossetto
21	FW	BRA	Moisés
22	MF	BRA	Yago Pikachu (3rd captain)
23	DF	BRA	David Luiz
26	FW	BRA	Breno Lopes
27	FW	COL	Dylan Borrero
28	MF	BRA	Pedro Augusto
32	DF	ARG	Gastón Ávila (on loan from Ajax)
33	DF	ARG	Emanuel Brítez (5th captain)
36	DF	BRA	Felipe Jonatan
37	MF	BRA	Kauan Rodrigues
38	MF	BRA	Lucca Prior
39	DF	BRA	Gustavo Mancha
77	MF	VEN	Kervin Andrade
79	FW	BRA	Renato Kayzer
88	MF	BRA	Lucas Sasha

=== Transfers In ===
Pos.	Player	Transferred from	Fee	Date	Source
DF	(Brazil) Diogo Barbosa	(Brazil) Fluminense	Free	1 January 2025	
MF	(Argentina) Pol Fernández	(Argentina) Boca Juniors	Free	1 January 2025	
DF	(Brazil) David Luiz	(Brazil) Flamengo	Free	20 January 2025	
FW	(Brazil) Deyverson	(Brazil) Atlético Mineiro	€1,150,000	28 March 2025	
MF	(Argentina) José María Herrera	(Argentina) Argentinos Juniors	US$2,400,000	30 June 2025	
MF	(Brazil) Matheus Pereira	(Spain) Eibar	Free	27 May 2025	
FW	(Paraguay) Adam Bareiro	(Argentina) River Plate	US$1,800,000	8 July 2025	
DF	(Brazil) Weverson	(Portugal) Arouca	Free	17 July 2025	
GK	(Brazil) Helton Leite	(Spain) Deportivo de La Coruña	€300,000	6 August 2025	
MF	(Brazil) Pablo Roberto	(Portugal) Casa Pia	Undisclosed	21 August 2025	
FW	(Brazil) Kayke	(Brazil) Botafogo	Loan	29 August 2025	
MF	(Brazil) Lucas Crispim	(Thailand) Buriram United	Undisclosed	1 September 2025	
MF	(Colombia) Yeison Guzmán	(Russia) Torpedo Moscow	€1,500,000	1 September 2025	
DF	(Brazil) Marcelo Benevenuto	(Brazil) Criciúma	Loan return	2 September 2025	

=== Transfers Out ===
Pos.	Player	Transferred to	Fee	Date	Source
DF	(Colombia) Brayan Ceballos	(United States) New England Revolution	Undisclosed	1 January 2025	
MF	(Brazil) Hércules	(Brazil) Fluminense	€4,600,000	1 January 2025	
MF	(Brazil) Ronald	(Brazil) Vitória	Free	5 January 2025	
FW	(Malaysia) Imanol Machuca	(Argentina) Vélez Sarsfield	€244,000 loan fee	13 January 2025	
DF	(Argentina) Tomás Cardona	(Argentina) Talleres	Loan	28 February 2025	
FW	(Brazil) Renato Kayzer	(Brazil) Vitória	R$ 5,000,000	2 April 2025	
MF	(Argentina) Pol Fernández	(Argentina) Godoy Cruz	Contract terminated	9 June 2025	
DF	(Brazil) Titi	(Brazil) Goiás	Undisclosed	10 June 2025	
DF	(Brazil) Felipe Jonatan	(Brazil) Mirassol	Loan	25 June 2025	
DF	(Argentina) Tomás Cardona	(Argentina) Tigre	Loan	27 June 2025	
MF	(Brazil) Calebe	(Spain) Deportivo Alavés	Loan	22 July 2025	
DF	(Brazil) David Luiz	(Cyprus) Pafos FC	Free	3 August 2025	

== Exhibition matches ==
18 January 2025 Orlando Cup	Miami United FC (United States)	2–1	(Brazil) Fortaleza

19 January 2025 Orlando Cup	Chicago Fire (United States)	0–1	(Brazil) Fortaleza	Davie, Florida
			67' Moisés	Stadium: Beyond Bancard Field

== Competitions ==
=== Overall record ===
Competition	First match	Last match	Starting round	Final position	Record							
Competition	First match	Last match	Starting round	Final position	Pld	W	D	L	GF	GA	GD	Win %
Série A	29 March 2025	21 December 2025	Matchday 1		37	11	10	16	42	54	−12	29.73
Campeonato Cearense	25 January 2025	22 March 2025	First stage	Runner-up	9	5	2	2	15	5	+10	55.56
Copa do Brasil	29 April 2025	21 May 2025	Third Round	Third Round	2	0	2	0	2	2	+0	0.00
Copa do Nordeste	23 January 2025	9 July 2025	Matchday 1	Quarter-finals	8	3	0	5	12	9	+3	37.50
Copa Libertadores	1 April 2025	19 August 2025	Group Stage	Round of 16	8	2	3	3	8	7	+1	25.00
Total					64	21	17	26	79	77	+2	32.81

Last updated: 26 November 2025
Source: Competitions

=== Campeonato Cearense ===
==== First stage ====
25 January 2025 2	Horizonte	1–3	Fortaleza	Horizonte
16:30 (UTC-3)	Waldson 60'	Report	Renato Kayzer 10', 57' (pen.); Breno Lopes 30' (pen.)	Stadium: Estádio Olímpico Horácio Domingos de Sousa; Attendance: 6,005; Referee: Marcelo de Lima Henrique

27 January 2025 1*	Fortaleza	7–0	Cariri	Fortaleza
20:30 (UTC-3)	Moisés 13'; Lucero 31', 45+1'; Marinho 34'; Pochettino 74'; Yago Pikachu 75'; Brítez 90+2'	Report		Stadium: Estádio Presidente Vargas; Attendance: 8,072; Referee: Joanilson Scarcella

30 January 2025 3	Fortaleza	1–0	Maracanã	Fortaleza
20:30 (UTC-3)	Marinho 66'	Report		Stadium: Estádio Presidente Vargas; Attendance: 9,559; Referee: Luciano da Silva

1 February 2025 4	Floresta	0–1	Fortaleza	Fortaleza
16:30 (UTC-3)		Report	Yago Pikachu 25'	Stadium: Estádio Presidente Vargas; Referee: Antônio Magno Lima Cordeiro

8 February 2025 5	Fortaleza	1–2	Ceará	Fortaleza
16:30 (UTC-3)	Lucero 73'	Report	Mugni 16'; Pedro Henrique 25'	Stadium: Castelão; Attendance: 42,464; Referee: Matheus Delgado Candançan

==== Semi-finals ====
1 March 2025 First Leg	Ferroviário	0–0	Fortaleza	Fortaleza
16:30 (UTC-3)		Report		Stadium: Estádio Presidente Vargas; Attendance: 2,982; Referee: Raimundo Rodrigues de Oliveira Júnior

8 March 2025 Second Leg	Fortaleza	1–0 (1–0 agg.)	Ferroviário	Fortaleza
16:30 (UTC-3)	Lucero 90+2'	Report		Stadium: Estádio Presidente Vargas; Attendance: 16,027; Referee: Marcelo de Lima Henrique

==== Finals ====
15 March 2025 First Leg	Fortaleza	0–1	Ceará	Fortaleza
		Report	Sobral 82'	Stadium: Castelão

22 March 2025 Second Leg	Ceará	1–1 (2–1 agg.)	Fortaleza	Fortaleza
16:30 (UTC-3)

=== Copa do Nordeste ===
==== Group stage ====
Pos	Team	Pld	W	D	L	GF	GA	GD	Pts	Qualification
2	(Pernambuco) Sport	7	4	0	3	11	7	+4	12	Advance to Quarter-finals
3	(Ceará) Ferroviário	7	3	1	3	8	10	−2	10	Advance to Quarter-finals
4	(Ceará) Fortaleza	7	3	0	4	11	7	+4	9	Advance to Quarter-finals
5	(Alagoas) CRB	7	2	3	2	12	10	+2	9	
6	(Piauí) Altos	7	2	3	2	7	7	0	9	

Source: CBF

23 January 2025 1	Fortaleza	2–0	Moto Club	Fortaleza
19:00 (UTC-3)	Lucero 31' (pen.); Yago Pikachu 79'	Report		Stadium: Estádio Presidente Vargas; Attendance: 14,090; Referee: Jardiel da Rocha Soares

4 February 2025 2	Sport	0–2	Fortaleza	Recife
21:30 (UTC-3)		Report	Moisés 51'; Breno Lopes 90+2'	Stadium: Estádio Adelmar da Costa Carvalho (Ilha do Retiro); Attendance: 11,200; Referee: Rafael Carlos Salgueiro Lima

11 February 2025 3	Altos	2–1	Fortaleza	Teresina
21:30 (UTC-3)	Reis 68'; Rodrigão	Report	Zé Welison 48'	Stadium: Estádio Lindolfo Monteiro; Referee: Emerson Souza Silva

19 February 2025 4	Fortaleza	1–2	Vitória	Fortaleza
21:30 (UTC-3)	Lucero 40'	Report	Mosquito 53'; Baralhas 80'	Stadium: Castelão; Attendance: 11,949; Referee: Dênis da Silva Ribeiro Serafim

5 March 2025 5	Fortaleza	4–0	Ferroviário	Fortaleza
(UTC-3)	Moisés 2', 27'; Pikachu 13'; Kayzer 83'	Report		Stadium: Castelão; Attendance: 10,750; Referee: Márcio de Santos Oliveira

19 March 2025 6	Sousa	2–1	Fortaleza	Sousa
(UTC-3)	Luan Rodrigues 30', 57'		Kervin Andrade 33'

26 March 2025 7	Fortaleza	0–1	CRB	Fortaleza
(UTC-3)			Ramon 45+2'	Stadium: Castelão

==== Final stages ====
9 July 2025 Quarter-finals	Bahia	2–1	Fortaleza	Salvador
21:30	Willian José 39' (pen.); Caio Alexandre 45+6'	Report	Matheus Pereira 68'	Stadium: Arena Fonte Nova; Referee: Antônio Dib Moraes de Sousa

=== Copa do Brasil ===
Fortaleza will enter the competition in the third round.

==== Third Round ====
29 April 2025 First leg	Retrô	1–1	Fortaleza	São Lourenço da Mata
19:00 UTC−3	Franco 33'	Report	Lucero 88'	Stadium: Arena Pernambuco; Referee: Alex Gomes Stefano

21 May 2025 Second leg	Fortaleza	1–1 (2–2 agg.) (1–4 p)	Retrô	Fortaleza
19:00 UTC−3	Breno 57'	Report	Mike 65'	Stadium: Castelão; Referee: Flavio Rodrigues de Souza
	Penalties
	Juan Martín Lucero (penalty missed); Yago Pikachu (penalty scored); Kervin Andrade (penalty missed)		(penalty scored) Bruno Marques; (penalty scored) Júnior Fialho; (penalty scored) Radsley; (penalty scored) Richard Franco

=== Copa Libertadores ===
==== Group Stage ====
The draw for the group stage was held on March 17, 2025.

Pos	Team	Pld	W	D	L	GF	GA	GD	Pts	Qualification
1	(Argentina) Racing	6	4	1	1	14	3	+11	13	Advance to round of 16
2	(Brazil) Fortaleza	6	2	2	2	8	5	+3	8	Advance to round of 16
3	(Colombia) Atlético Bucaramanga	6	1	3	2	6	10	−4	6	Transfer to Copa Sudamericana
4	(Chile) Colo-Colo	6	1	2	3	5	15	−10	5	

Source: CONMEBOL

1 April 2025 1	Fortaleza (Brazil)	0–3	(Argentina) Racing	Fortaleza, Brazil
21:30 UTC−3		Report	Salas 26'; Almendra 48'; Sosa 84'	Stadium: Castelão; Attendance: 40,413; Referee: Juan Gabriel Benítez (Paraguay)

10 April 2025 2	Colo-Colo (Chile)	0–3; Awarded	(Brazil) Fortaleza	Santiago, Chile
20:30 UTC−4				Stadium: Estadio Monumental David Arellano
Note: The match was abandoned at 0–0 in the 68th minute following a pitch invasion after two supporters died in an incident prior to the start of the match. On 30 April 2025, CONMEBOL's Disciplinary Commission awarded Fortaleza a 3–0 win.

23 April 2025 3	Atlético Bucaramanga (Colombia)	1–1	(Brazil) Fortaleza	Bucaramanga, Colombia
21:00 UTC−5	Pons 89' (pen.)	Report	Deyverson 19'	Stadium: Estadio Américo Montanini; Referee: Kevin Ortega (Peru)

6 May 2025 4	Fortaleza (Brazil)	4–0	(Chile) Colo-Colo	Fortaleza, Brazil
21:30 UTC−3	Breno Lopes 25'; Marinho 30'; Deyverson 39'; Lucero 84'	Report		Stadium: Castelão; Attendance: 30,902; Referee: Jesús Valenzuela (Venezuela)

13 May 2025 5	Fortaleza (Brazil)	0–0	(Colombia) Atlético Bucaramanga	Fortaleza, Brazil
21:30 UTC−3		Report		Stadium: Castelão; Attendance: 40,279; Referee: Derlis López (Paraguay)

29 May 2025 6	Racing (Argentina)	1–0	(Brazil) Fortaleza	Avellaneda, Argentina
21:30 UTC−3	Martínez 90+4'	Report		Stadium: El Cilindro; Attendance: 22,141; Referee: Alexis Herrera (Venezuela)

==== Round of 16 ====
12 August 2025 First leg	Fortaleza (Brazil)	0–0	(Argentina) Vélez Sarsfield	Fortaleza
19:00 UTC−3		Report		Stadium: Castelão; Attendance: 27,955; Referee: Derlis López (Paraguay)

19 August 2025 Second leg	Vélez Sarsfield (Argentina)	2–0 (2–0 agg.)	(Brazil) Fortaleza	Buenos Aires
19:00 UTC−3	Carrizo 7'; Galván 28'	Report		Stadium: Estadio José Amalfitani; Referee: Andrés Rojas (Colombia)

=== Série A ===
==== League table ====
Pos	Team	Pld	W	D	L	GF	GA	GD	Pts	Qualification or relegation
16	Internacional	38	11	11	16	44	57	−13	44	
17	Ceará (R)	38	11	10	17	34	40	−6	43	Relegation to Campeonato Brasileiro Série B
18	Fortaleza (R)	38	11	10	17	44	58	−14	43	Relegation to Campeonato Brasileiro Série B
19	Juventude (R)	38	9	8	21	35	69	−34	35	Relegation to Campeonato Brasileiro Série B
20	Sport (R)	38	2	11	25	28	75	−47	17	Relegation to Campeonato Brasileiro Série B

Source: CBF
Rules for classification: 1) points; 2) wins; 3) goal difference; 4) goals scored; 5) head-to-head results (only between two teams); 6) fewest red cards; 7) fewest yellow cards; 8) drawing of lots.
(R) Relegated

==== Results summary ====
Overall								Home						Away					
Pld	W	D	L	GF	GA	GD	Pts	W	D	L	GF	GA	GD	W	D	L	GF	GA	GD
38	11	10	17	43	58	−15	43	8	3	8	23	23	0	3	7	9	20	35	−15

==== Results by round ====
Round	1	2	3	4	5	6	7	8	9	10	11	12	13	14	15	16	17	18	19	20	21	22	23	24	25	26	27	28	29	30	31	32	33	34	35	36	37	38
Ground	H	A	H	A	H	A	A	H	A	H	A	H	H	A	H	A	H	A	H	A	H	A	H	A	H	H	A	H	A	H	A	A	H	A	H	A	H	A
Result	W	D	D	L	L	D	D	W	L	L	L	L	L	L	D	D	W	D	L	L	L	L	W	L	W	L	W	L	L	W	D	D	D	W	W	W	W	L
Position	1	4	7	11	14	15	17	11	14	16	17	18	19	19	19	19	18	18	19	19	19	19	19	19	18	19	17	18	19	18	18	18	19	18	18	18	16	18

A = Away; H = Home; W = Win; D = Draw; L = Loss

==== Matches ====
The schedule was announced on 12 February 2025.

30 March 2025 1	Fortaleza	2–0	Fluminense	Fortaleza
(UTC-3)	Lucero 4'; Tinga 21'	Report		Stadium: Estádio Governador Plácido Castelo (Castelão); Referee: Rodrigo José Pereira de Lima

6 April 2025 2	Mirassol	1–1	Fortaleza	Mirassol
18:30 (UTC-3)	Cristian Renato 90+3'	Report	Emmanuel Martínez 15'	Stadium: Estádio José Maria de Campos Maia; Referee: Sávio Sampaio

13 April 2025 3	Fortaleza	0–0	Internacional	Fortaleza
20:00 (UTC-3)		Report		Stadium: Estádio Governador Plácido Castelo (Castelão); Attendance: 16,587; Referee: Flávio Rodrigues de Souza

16 April 2025 4	Vitória	2–1	Fortaleza	Salvador
21:30 (UTC-3)	Janderson 37'; Matheuzinho 74'	Report	Diogo Barbosa 48'	Stadium: Estádio Manoel Barradas (Barradão)

20 April 2025 5	Fortaleza	1–2	Palmeiras	Fortaleza
(UTC-3)	Deyverson 70'	Report	Torres 45+4'; López 58'	Stadium: Arena Castelão; Attendance: 23,439; Referee: Paulo César Zanovelli da Silva (Minas Gerais)

27 April 2025 6	Sport	0–0	Fortaleza	Recife
20:00 (UTC-3)		Report		Stadium: Estádio Adelmar da Costa Carvalho (Ilha do Retiro)

2 May 2025 7	São Paulo	0–0	Fortaleza	São Paulo
21:30 (UTC-3)		Report		Stadium: Estádio Cícero Pompeu de Toledo (Morumbi); Attendance: 39,502; Referee: Wagner do Nascimento Magalhães

10 May 2025 8	Fortaleza	5–0	Juventude	Fortaleza
16:00 (UTC-3)	Lucero 3', 86'; Breno Lopes 63'; Pochettino 82'; Calebe 89'	Report		Stadium: Estádio Governador Plácido Castelo (Castelão)

18 May 2025 9	Vasco da Gama	3–0	Fortaleza	Rio de Janeiro
18:30 (UTC-3)	Moreira 3'; Vegetti 46', 80'	Report		Stadium: Estádio Vasco da Gama (São Januário)

25 May 2025 10	Fortaleza	0–2	Cruzeiro	Fortaleza
20:30 (UTC-3)		Report	Kaio Jorge 34'; Lucas Silva 41'	Stadium: Estádio Governador Plácido Castelo (Castelão); Attendance: 12,483; Referee: João Vitor Gobi

1 June 2025 11	Flamengo	5–0	Fortaleza	Rio de Janeiro
18:30 (UTC-3)	de Arrascaeta 30'; E. Araújo 48'; L. Araújo 56', 74'; Michael 71'	Report		Stadium: Estádio Jornalista Mário Filho (Maracanã); Attendance: 64,900; Referee: Gustavo Ervino Bauermann

12 June 2025 12	Fortaleza	2–3	Santos	Fortaleza
19:30 (UTC-3)	Pikachu 71' (pen.), 74' (pen.)		Barreal 15'; Guilherme 41'; João Ricardo 90+2' (o.g.)	Stadium: Estádio Governador Plácido Castelo (Castelão); Attendance: 20,381; Referee: Paulo César Zanovelli da Silva

13 July 2025 13	Fortaleza	0–1	Ceará	Fortaleza
20:30 (UTC-3)		Report	Galeano 57'	Stadium: Estádio Governador Plácido Castelo (Castelão)

19 July 2025 15	Fortaleza	1–1	Bahia	Fortaleza
(UTC-3)	Marinho 20'	Report	Rodrigo Nestor 80'	Stadium: Estádio Governador Plácido Castelo (Castelão)

26 July 2025 17	Fortaleza	3–1	Red Bull Bragantino	Fortaleza
18:30 (UTC-3)	Deyverson 4'; Kuscevic 19'; Prior 48'		Pitta 38'	Stadium: Estádio Governador Plácido Castelo (Castelão); Referee: Wagner do Nascimento Magalhães

29 July 2025 14	Grêmio	2–1	Fortaleza	Porto Alegre
(UTC-3)	Braithwaite 12' (pen.), 17' (pen.)	Report	Deyverson 24'	Stadium: Arena do Grêmio; Attendance: 18,695; Referee: Alex Gomes Stefano

1 August 2025 18	Corinthians	1–1	Fortaleza	São Paulo
(UTC-3)	Carrillo 90+4'	Report	Breno Lopes 6'	Stadium: Neo Química Arena; Attendance: 34,805; Referee: Felipe Fernandes de Lima

9 August 2025 19	Fortaleza	0–5	Botafogo	Fortaleza
20:30 (UTC-3)		Report	Marçal 14', 48'; Cabral 45+5'; David Ricardo 53'; Matheus Martins 90+3'	Stadium: Estádio Governador Plácido Castelo (Castelão)

16 August 2025 20	Fluminense	2–1	Fortaleza	Rio de Janeiro
16:00 (UTC-3)	Cano 9'; Canobbio 64'	Report	Breno Lopes 73'	Stadium: Estádio Jornalista Mário Filho (Maracanã)

24 August 2025 21	Fortaleza	0–1	Mirassol	Fortaleza
18:30 (UTC-3)			Carioca 17'	Stadium: Estádio Governador Plácido Castelo (Castelão); Referee: Bruno Pereira Vasconcelos

29 August 2025 22	Internacional	2–1	Fortaleza	Porto Alegre
20:30 (UTC-3)	Alan Patrick 24' (pen.); Vitinho 51'	Report	Lucca Prior 31'	Stadium: Estádio José Pinheiro Borda (Beira-Rio); Attendance: 9,099; Referee: João Vitor Gobi

13 September 2025 23	Fortaleza	2–0	Vitória	Fortaleza
16:00 (UTC-3)	Breno Lopes 31'; Bruno Pacheco 47'	Report		Stadium: Estádio Governador Plácido Castelo (Castelão)

20 September 2025 24	Palmeiras	4–1	Fortaleza	São Paulo
21:00 (UTC-3)	Raphael Veiga 10' (pen.); Sosa 57'; Andreas Pereira 82', 90'	Report	Lucas Crispim 23'	Stadium: Allianz Parque; Attendance: 35,324; Referee: Alex Gomes Stefano

27 September 2025 25	Fortaleza	1–0	Sport	Fortaleza
16:00 (UTC-3)	Lucas Sasha 44'	Report		Stadium: Estádio Governador Plácido Castelo (Castelão); Attendance: 28,123; Referee: Davi de Oliveira Lacerda

2 October 2025 26	Fortaleza	0–2	São Paulo	Fortaleza
19:30 (UTC-3)		Report	Tapia 11'; Luciano 85'	Stadium: Estádio Governador Plácido Castelo (Castelão); Attendance: 35,544; Referee: Anderson Daronco

5 October 2025 27	Juventude	1–2	Fortaleza	Caxias do Sul
18:30 (UTC-3)	Rafael Bilú 6'	Report	Mancuso 72'; Bareiro 85'	Stadium: Estádio Alfredo Jaconi

15 October 2025 28	Fortaleza	0–2	Vasco da Gama	Fortaleza
(UTC-3)		Report	Rayan 45+4'; David 82'	Stadium: Estádio Governador Plácido Castelo (Castelão); Attendance: 27,658; Referee: Wilton Sampaio

18 October 2025 29	Cruzeiro	1–0	Fortaleza	Belo Horizonte
21:00 (UTC-3)	Christian 21'	Report		Stadium: Estádio Governador Magalhães Pinto (Mineirão); Attendance: 40,410; Referee: Rodrigo José Pereira de Lima

25 October 2025 30	Fortaleza	1–0	Flamengo	Fortaleza
19:30 (UTC-3)	Lopes 12'	Report		Stadium: Estádio Governador Plácido Castelo (Castelão); Referee: Davi de Oliveira Lacerda

1 November 2025 31	Santos	1–1	Fortaleza	Santos
16:00 (UTC-3)	Bruno Pacheco 74' (o.g.)	Report	Bareiro 35'	Stadium: Estádio Urbano Caldeira (Vila Belmiro); Attendance: 13,356; Referee: Anderson Daronco

6 November 2025 32	Ceará	1–1	Fortaleza	Fortaleza
20:00 (UTC-3)	Pedro Raul 90'	Report	Bareiro 37'	Stadium: Estádio Governador Plácido Castelo (Castelão); Attendance: 51,120; Referee: Wilton Sampaio

9 November 2025 33	Fortaleza	2–2	Grêmio	Fortaleza
20:30 (UTC-3)	Bareiro 5'; Matheus Pereira 65'	Report	Carlos Vinícius 14'; Marlon 32'	Stadium: Estádio Governador Plácido Castelo (Castelão); Attendance: 16,025; Referee: Jefferson Ferreira de Moraes

12 November 2025 16	Atlético Mineiro	3–3	Fortaleza	Belo Horizonte
20:30 (UTC-3)	Hulk 8'; Vitor Hugo 45+2'; Dudu 61'	Report	Deyverson 47', 67' (pen.), 90+3'	Stadium: Arena MRV; Attendance: 39,246; Referee: Sávio Sampaio

20 November 2025 34	Bahia	2–3	Fortaleza	Salvador
18:00 (UTC-3)	Willian José 66' (pen.); Tiago 88'	Report	Bareiro 30'; Herrera 36'; Deyverson 75'	Stadium: Casa de Apostas Arena Fonte Nova (Fonte Nova)

26 November 2025 36	Red Bull Bragantino	0–1	Fortaleza	Bragança Paulista
19:00 (UTC-3)		Report	Bareiro 76'	Stadium: Estádio Nabi Abi Chedid

30 November 2025 35	Fortaleza	1–0	Atlético Mineiro	Fortaleza
18:30 (UTC-3)	Pochettino 41'	Report		Stadium: Estádio Governador Plácido Castelo (Castelão); Attendance: 51,793; Referee: Davi De Oliveira Lacerda

3 December 2025 37	Fortaleza	2–1	Corinthians	Fortaleza
19:00 (UTC-3)	Pochettino 8'; Herrera 58'	Report	André 70'	Stadium: Estádio Governador Plácido Castelo (Castelão); Attendance: 56,014; Referee: Sávio Pereira Sampaio

7 December 2025 38	Botafogo	4–2	Fortaleza	Rio de Janeiro
16:00 (UTC-3)	Montoro 45+5'; Arthur Cabral 48'; Marçal 84'; Ponte 90+5'	Report	Breno Lopes 17'; Bareiro 56' (pen.)	Stadium: Estádio Olímpico Nilton Santos (Engenhão); Attendance: 26,032
