= 2024 Fortaleza Esporte Clube season =

Fortaleza Esporte Clube
2024 season
- Manager: Juan Pablo Vojvoda
- Stadium: Castelão
- Série A: 4th
- Campeonato Cearense: Runners-up
- Copa do Brasil: Third round
- Copa do Nordeste: Winners
- Copa Sudamericana: Quarter-finals
- Top goalscorer: League: Juan Martín Lucero (8); All: Juan Martín Lucero (22)
- Average home league attendance: 29,279
- Biggest win: Barbalha 0–5 Fortaleza
- Biggest defeat: Cuiabá 5–0 Fortaleza
| Home colours | Away colours | Third colours |

The 2024 season was the 106th season in the history of Fortaleza Esporte Clube and the sixth consecutive season in the top division. They played in the Série A and the Campeonato Cearense and the Copa Sudamericana.

== Squad ==
As of December 8, 2024

Note: Flags indicate national team as defined under FIFA eligibility rules; some limited exceptions apply. Players may hold more than one non-FIFA nationality.

| No. | Pos. | Nation | Player |
|---|---|---|---|
| 1 | GK | BRA | João Ricardo |
| 2 | DF | BRA | Tinga (captain) |
| 4 | DF | BRA | Titi (vice-captain) |
| 6 | DF | BRA | Bruno Pacheco |
| 7 | MF | ARG | Tomás Pochettino |
| 8 | MF | ARG | Emmanuel Martínez |
| 9 | FW | ARG | Juan Martín Lucero |
| 10 | MF | BRA | Calebe |
| 11 | FW | BRA | Marinho |
| 13 | DF | CHI | Benjamín Kuscevic |
| 14 | DF | BRA | Jhonatan Silva |
| 15 | GK | BRA | Bruno Guimarães |
| 16 | MF | BRA | Matheus Rossetto |
| 17 | MF | BRA | Zé Welison |
| 18 | MF | BRA | Luquinhas |
| 19 | DF | ARG | Emanuel Brítez |
| 21 | FW | BRA | Moisés |

| No. | Pos. | Nation | Player |
|---|---|---|---|
| 22 | MF | BRA | Yago Pikachu |
| 23 | GK | BRA | Santos |
| 26 | FW | BRA | Breno Lopes |
| 27 | DF | BRA | Geilson Souza |
| 28 | MF | BRA | Pedro Augusto |
| 30 | GK | BRA | Maurício Kozlinski |
| 31 | DF | BRA | Amorim |
| 33 | DF | ARG | Eros Mancuso |
| 34 | FW | BRA | Iarley |
| 35 | MF | BRA | Hercules |
| 36 | DF | BRA | Felipe Jonatan |
| 37 | MF | BRA | Kauan Rodrigues |
| 39 | FW | ARG | Imanol Machuca |
| 77 | MF | VEN | Kervin Andrade |
| 79 | FW | BRA | Renato Kayzer |
| 88 | MF | BRA | Lucas Sasha |
| — | GK | BRA | Magrão |

== Competitions ==
=== Overall record ===
| Competition | First match | Last match | Starting round | Final position | Record | | | | | | | |
| Competition | First match | Last match | Starting round | Final position | Pld | W | D | L | GF | GA | GD | Win % |
|---|---|---|---|---|---|---|---|---|---|---|---|---|
| Série A | 14 April 2024 | 8 December 2024 | Matchday 1 | 4th | 38 | 19 | 11 | 8 | 53 | 39 | +14 | 50.00 |
| Campeonato Cearense | 20 January 2024 | 6 April 2024 | 1st phase | Runners-up | 9 | 4 | 5 | 0 | 19 | 7 | +12 | 44.44 |
| Copa do Brasil | 4 March 2024 | 21 May 2024 | First round | Third round | 4 | 1 | 3 | 0 | 6 | 3 | +3 | 25.00 |
| Copa do Nordeste | 3 February 2024 | 9 June 2024 | Group stage | Winners | 12 | 5 | 2 | 5 | 20 | 13 | +7 | 41.67 |
| Copa Sudamericana | 3 April 2024 | 24 September 2024 | Group stage | Quarter Final | 10 | 5 | 2 | 3 | 19 | 15 | +4 | 50.00 |
| Total | | | | | 73 | 34 | 23 | 16 | 117 | 77 | +40 | 46.58 |

Last updated: 8 December 2024
Source: Soccerway

=== Série A ===
==== League table ====
| Pos | Team | Pld | W | D | L | GF | GA | GD | Pts | Qualification or relegation |
|---|---|---|---|---|---|---|---|---|---|---|
| 2 | Palmeiras | 38 | 22 | 7 | 9 | 60 | 33 | +27 | 73 | Qualification for Copa Libertadores group stage (Note: Botafogo and Flamengo qualified for the Copa Libertadores group stage by winning the 2024 Copa Libertadores and the 2024 Copa do Brasil, respectively.) |
| 3 | Flamengo | 38 | 20 | 10 | 8 | 61 | 42 | +19 | 70 | Qualification for Copa Libertadores group stage |
| 4 | Fortaleza | 38 | 19 | 11 | 8 | 53 | 39 | +14 | 68 | Qualification for Copa Libertadores group stage |
| 5 | Internacional | 38 | 18 | 11 | 9 | 53 | 36 | +17 | 65 | Qualification for Copa Libertadores group stage |
| 6 | São Paulo | 38 | 17 | 8 | 13 | 53 | 43 | +10 | 59 | Qualification for Copa Libertadores group stage |

Source: CBF
Rules for classification: 1) points; 2) wins; 3) goal difference; 4) goals scored; 5) head-to-head results (only between two teams); 6) fewest red cards; 7) fewest yellow cards; 8) drawing of lots.

==== Results summary ====
| Overall | | | | | | | | Home | | | | | | Away | | | | | |
| Pld | W | D | L | GF | GA | GD | Pts | W | D | L | GF | GA | GD | W | D | L | GF | GA | GD |
|---|---|---|---|---|---|---|---|---|---|---|---|---|---|---|---|---|---|---|---|
| 11 | 4 | 5 | 2 | 11 | 11 | 0 | 17 | 3 | 3 | 0 | 8 | 3 | +5 | 1 | 2 | 2 | 3 | 8 | −5 |

Last updated: 26 June 2024.

==== Results by round ====
| Round | 1 | 2 | 3 | 4 | 5 | 6 | 7 | 8 | 9 | 10 | 11 | 12 | 13 | 14 | 15 | 16 | 17 | 18 | 19 | 20 | 21 | 22 | 23 | 24 | 25 |
|---|---|---|---|---|---|---|---|---|---|---|---|---|---|---|---|---|---|---|---|---|---|---|---|---|---|
| Ground | A | H | A | H | A | H | H | A | A | H | A | H | H | A | H | A | H | H | A | H | A | H | A | H | A |
| Result | W | D | D | D | D | D | W | L | L | W | D | W | W | L | W | W | W | W | P | W | W | W | W | W | |
| Position | 3 | 6 | 8 | 11 | 12 | 12 | 9 | 11 | 11 | 10 | 10 | 10 | 8 | 9 | 7 | 6 | 6 | 4 | 4 | 4 | 3 | 2 | 2 | 1 | |

Updated to match(es) played on 25 August 2024. Source:
A = Away; H = Home; W = Win; D = Draw; L = Loss

==== Matches ====
The match schedule was released on 29 February.

| 13 April 2024 1 | São Paulo | 1–2 | Fortaleza | São Paulo |
| | | | | Stadium: Estádio do Morumbi |

| 17 April 2024 2 | Fortaleza | 1–1 | Cruzeiro | Fortaleza |
| | | | | Stadium: Castelão |

| 28 April 2024 4 | Fortaleza | 1–1 | Red Bull Bragantino | Fortaleza |
| | | | | Stadium: Castelão |

| 4 May 2024 5 | Corinthians | 0–0 | Fortaleza | São Paulo |
| | | | | Stadium: Arena Corinthians |

| 12 May 2024 6 | Fortaleza | 1–1 | Botafogo | Fortaleza |
| | | | | Stadium: Castelão |

| 2 June 2024 7 | Fortaleza | 1–0 | Athletico Paranaense | Fortaleza |
| | Kuscevic 45' | | | Stadium: Castelão |

| 13 June 2024 8 | Bahia | 1–0 | Fortaleza | Salvador |
| | Jean Lucas 80' | | | Stadium: Casa de Apostas Arena Fonte Nova |

| 16 June 2024 9 | Cuiabá | 5–0 | Fortaleza | Cuiabá |
| | Clayson 3'; Ramon 11'; Cafú 37'; Pitta 45+8'; Fernando Sobral 54' (pen.) | | | Stadium: Arena Pantanal |

| 19 June 2024 10 | Fortaleza | 1–0 | Grêmio | Fortaleza |
| | Lucero 42' (pen.) | | Pepê (red card) 44' | Stadium: Castelão |

| 23 June 2024 11 | Atlético Mineiro | 1–1 | Fortaleza | Belo Horizonte |
| | Paulinho 58' | | Lopes 25' | Stadium: Arena MRV |

| 26 June 2024 12 | Fortaleza | 3–0 | Palmeiras | Fortaleza |
| | Lucero 9', 48'; Pacheco 69' | | | Stadium: Castelão |

| 30 June 2024 13 | Fortaleza | 2–1 | Juventude | Fortaleza |
| | | | | Stadium: Castelão |

| 3 July 2024 14 | Vasco da Gama | 2–0 | Fortaleza | Rio de Janeiro |
| | Mateus Carvalho 45+3'; Vegetti 63' | | | Stadium: São Januário; Referee: Matheus Delgado Candançan |

| 7 July 2024 15 | Fortaleza | 1–0 | Fluminense | Fortaleza |
| | Lucero 56' | Report | | Stadium: Castelão; Attendance: 34,831; Referee: Davi de Oliveira Lacerda |

| 11 July 2024 16 | Flamengo | 1–2 | Fortaleza | Rio de Janeiro |
| | Pedro 39' (pen.) | Report | Wesley 11' (o.g.); Lucero 63' (Pochettino) | Stadium: Maracanã; Attendance: 57,517; Referee: Edina Alves Batista |

| 17 July 2024 17 | Fortaleza | 3–1 | Vitória | Fortaleza |
| | | | | Stadium: Castelão |

| 21 July 2024 18 | Fortaleza | 3–1 | Atlético Goianiense | Fortaleza |
| | | | | Stadium: Castelão |

| 24 July 2024 3 | Criciúma | 1–1 | Fortaleza | Criciúma |
| | | | | Stadium: Estádio Heriberto Hülse |

| 28 July 2024 20 | Fortaleza | 1–0 | São Paulo | Fortaleza |
| | | | | Stadium: Castelão |

| 6 August 2024 21 | Cruzeiro | 1–2 | Fortaleza | Belo Horizonte |
| | | | | Stadium: Mineirão |

| 10 August 2024 22 | Fortaleza | 1–0 | Criciúma | Fortaleza |
| | | | | Stadium: Castelão |

| 17 August 2024 23 | Red Bull Bragantino | 1–2 | Fortaleza | Bragança Paulista |
| | | | | Stadium: Estádio Nabi Abi Chedid |

| 25 August 2024 24 | Fortaleza | 1–0 | Corinthians | Fortaleza |
| | | | | Stadium: Castelão |

| 31 August 2024 25 | Botafogo | 2–0 | Fortaleza | Rio de Janeiro |
| 21:00 UTC−3 | Igor Jesus 73', 90+1' | | | Stadium: Estádio Nilton Santos; Attendance: 32,564; Referee: Flávio Rodrigues de Souza |

| 11 September 2024 19 | Internacional | 2–1 | Fortaleza | Porto Alegre |
| 19:00 | Alan Patrick 21'; Gustavo Prado 84' | Report | Titi 45+2' | Stadium: Beira-Rio; Attendance: 23,358; Referee: Gustavo Ervino Bauermann |

| 14 September 2024 26 | Athletico Paranaense | 1–1 | Fortaleza | Curitiba |
| 18:30 BRT (UTC−3) | Canobbio 28' | Report | Moisés 14' | Stadium: Ligga Arena; Attendance: 16,452; Referee: Davi Lacerda |

| 21 September 2024 27 | Fortaleza | 4–1 | Bahia | Fortaleza |
| | Marinho 28', 38'; Pochettino 80'; Kayzer 89' | | Everaldo 30' | Stadium: Castelão; Attendance: 42,051 |

| 29 September 2024 28 | Fortaleza | 1–0 | Cuiabá | Fortaleza |
| | Hércules 45+5' | | | Stadium: Castelão; Attendance: 32,085 |

| 4 October 2024 29 | Gremio | 3–1 | Fortaleza | Porto Alegre |
| | | | | Stadium: Arena do Grêmio |

| 16 October 2024 30 | Fortaleza | 1–1 | Atlético Mineiro | Fortaleza |
| | | | | Stadium: Castelão |

| 26 October 2024 31 | Palmeiras | 2–2 | Fortaleza | São Paulo |
| 16:30 UTC−3 | Raphael Veiga 29' (pen.); Estêvão 57' (pen.) | Report | Hércules 38'; Moisés 62' | Stadium: Allianz Parque; Attendance: 40,321; Referee: Ramon Abatti Abel (Santa Catarina) |

| 2 November 2024 32 | Juventude | 0–3 | Fortaleza | Caxias do Sul |
| | | | Moisés 45+3'; Mancuso 45+8'; Kuscevic 71' | Stadium: Estádio Alfredo Jaconi; Attendance: 7,479 |

| 9 November 2024 33 | Fortaleza | 3–0 | Vasco da Gama | Fortaleza |
| | | | Martínez 13'; Lopes 79'; Kayzer 90+2' | Stadium: Castelão; Attendance: 44,293 |

| 20 November 2024 34 | Fluminense | 2–2 | Fortaleza | Rio de Janeiro |
| 20:30 (UTC-3) | Lima 11'; Cano 85' | Report | Moisés 19'; Marinho 43' | Stadium: Maracanã; Attendance: 37,969; Referee: Raphael Claus |

| 26 November 2024 35 | Fortaleza | 0–0 | Flamengo | Fortaleza |
| 20:00 UTC−3 | | Report | | Stadium: Arena Castelão; Attendance: 57,624; Referee: Anderson Daronco |

| 1 December 2024 36 | Vitória | 2–0 | Fortaleza | Salvador |
| | | | | Stadium: Barradão |

| 4 December 2024 37 | Atletico Goianiense | 3–1 | Fortaleza | Goiânia |
| | | | | Stadium: Estádio Serra Dourada |

| 8 December 2024 38 | Fortaleza | 3–0 | Internacional | Fortaleza |
| | | | | Stadium: Arena Castelão |

=== Campeonato Cearense ===
==== First phase ====
| 20 January 2024 1 | Fortaleza | 2–0 | Horizonte |

| 28 January 2024 2 | Barbalha | 0–5 | Fortaleza | Juazeiro do Norte |
| | | | | Stadium: Estádio Mauro Sampaio |

| 1 February 2024 3 | Fortaleza | 3–1 | Iguatu |

| 8 February 2024 4 | Ferroviário | 1–1 | Fortaleza |

| 17 February 2024 5 | Fortaleza | 3–3 | Ceará |

==== Semi-finals ====
| 10 March 2024 First leg | Maracanã | 1–1 | Fortaleza |

| 17 March 2024 Second leg | Fortaleza | 3–0 | Maracanã |

==== Final ====
| 30 March 2024 First leg | Fortaleza | 0–0 | Ceará | Fortaleza |
| | | | | Stadium: Castelão |

| 6 April 2024 Second leg | Ceará | 1–1 (1–1 agg.) (3–2 p) | Fortaleza | Fortaleza |
| | Mineiro 49' | | Lucero 58' | Stadium: Castelão |
| | Penalties |
| | Matheus Felipe (penalty missed); Guilherme Castilho (penalty missed); Recalde (penalty scored); Lourenço (penalty scored); Ramos (penalty scored) | | (penalty missed) Yago Pikachu; (penalty scored) Zé Welison; (penalty scored) Moisés; (penalty missed) Tinga; (penalty missed) Machuca |

=== Copa do Brasil ===
==== First Round ====
| 4 March 2024 | Fluminense-PI | 0–3 | Fortaleza | Teresina |
| 16:00 | | Report | Kuscevic 47'; Lucero 73'; Kervin Andrade 90+5' | Stadium: Estádio Lindolfo Monteiro; Attendance: 942; Referee: Luiz Flávio de Oliveira (São Paulo) |

==== Second Round ====
| 14 March 2024 | Fortaleza | 0–0 (3–2 p) | Retrô | Fortaleza |
| 21:30 | | Report | | Stadium: Castelão; Referee: João Vitor Gobi (São Paulo) |
| | Penalties |
| | Calebe (penalty missed); Lucero (penalty missed); Kervin Andrade (penalty scored); Zé Welison (penalty scored); Tinga (penalty scored) | | (penalty missed) Fernandinho; (penalty missed) Renato Henrique; (penalty scored) Edson Lucas; (penalty missed) Luisinho; (penalty scored) Giva |

==== Third Round ====
| 1 May 2024 First Leg | Fortaleza | 0–0 | Vasco da Gama | Fortaleza |
| 19:00 | | | | Stadium: Castelão |

| 21 May 2024 Second Leg | Vasco da Gama | 3–3 (3–3 agg.) (5–4 p) | Fortaleza | Rio de Janeiro |
| 21:30 | Pablo Vegetti 16' (pen.), 65'; Lucas Piton 75' | Report | Marinho 7'; Lucero 54'; Hércules 88' | Stadium: São Januário; Referee: Wilton Pereira Sampaio |
| | Penalties |
| | Dimitri Payet (penalty scored); Juan Sforza (penalty scored); Lucas Piton (penalty scored); Pumita Rodríguez (penalty scored); Pablo Vegetti (penalty scored) | | (penalty scored) Lucero; (penalty scored) Yago Pikachu; (penalty scored) Hércules; (penalty scored) Zé Welison; (penalty missed) Kervin Andrade |

=== Copa do Nordeste ===
==== Group Stage ====
| Pos | Team | Pld | W | D | L | GF | GA | GD | Pts | Qualification |
|---|---|---|---|---|---|---|---|---|---|---|
| 1 | Bahia | 8 | 6 | 0 | 2 | 11 | 8 | +3 | 18 | Advance to Quarter-finals |
| 2 | (Ceará) Fortaleza | 8 | 2 | 2 | 4 | 9 | 10 | −1 | 8 | Advance to Quarter-finals |
| 3 | (Piauí) Altos | 8 | 1 | 5 | 2 | 6 | 8 | −2 | 8 | Advance to Quarter-finals |
| 4 | (Pernambuco) Náutico | 8 | 1 | 4 | 3 | 7 | 8 | −1 | 7 | Advance to Quarter-finals |
| 5 | (Rio Grande do Norte) ABC | 8 | 1 | 4 | 3 | 8 | 12 | −4 | 7 | |

Source: CBF

==== Quarter-finals ====
| 21 April 2024 | Fortaleza (Ceará) | 5–0 | (Piauí) Altos | Fortaleza |
| 19:00 | Marinho 28' (pen.); Andrade 36', 45+1'; Moisés 42'; Yago Pikachu 68' | Report | | Stadium: Castelão; Referee: Márcio dos Santos Oliveira (Alagoas) |

==== Semi-finals ====
| 26 May 2024 | Sport (Pernambuco) | 1–4 | (Ceará) Fortaleza | São Lourenço da Mata |
| 18:00 | Gustavo Coutinho 82' | Report | Moisés 8', 18', 42'; Hércules 21' | Stadium: Arena Pernambuco; Referee: Caio Max Augusto Vieira (Rio Grande do Norte) |

==== Finals ====
| 5 June 2024 First Leg | Fortaleza (Ceará) | 2–0 | (Alagoas) CRB | Fortaleza |
| 21:30 | Moisés 40'; Lucero 45+3' | Report | | Stadium: Castelão; Referee: Paulo Belence Alves dos Prazeres Filho (Pernambuco) |

| 9 June 2024 Second Leg | CRB (Alagoas) | 2–0 (2–2 agg.) (4–5 p) | (Ceará) Fortaleza | Maceió |
| 16:30 | João Neto 65', 86' | Report | | Stadium: Estádio Rei Pelé; Referee: Emerson Ricardo de Almeida Andrade (Bahia) |
| | Penalties |
| | Anselmo Ramon (penalty missed); Gegê (penalty scored); João Neto (penalty scored); Hereda (penalty scored); Matheus Ribeiro (penalty scored) | | (penalty scored) Lucero; (penalty scored) Pedro Rocha; (penalty scored) Zé Welison; (penalty scored) Hércules; (penalty scored) Yago Pikachu |

=== Copa Sudamericana ===
==== Group stage ====
| Pos | Team | Pld | W | D | L | GF | GA | GD | Pts | Qualification | FOR | BOC | NAP | TRI |
|---|---|---|---|---|---|---|---|---|---|---|---|---|---|---|
| 1 | (Brazil) Fortaleza | 6 | 4 | 1 | 1 | 15 | 8 | +7 | 13 | Advance to round of 16 | — | 4–2 | 5–0 | 2–1 |
| 2 | (Argentina) Boca Juniors | 6 | 3 | 2 | 1 | 10 | 6 | +4 | 11 | Advance to knockout round play-offs | 1–1 | — | 4–0 | 1–0 |
| 3 | (Bolivia) Nacional Potosí | 6 | 2 | 1 | 3 | 6 | 13 | −7 | 7 | | 4–1 | 0–0 | — | 2–1 |
| 4 | (Paraguay) Sportivo Trinidense | 6 | 1 | 0 | 5 | 5 | 9 | −4 | 3 | | 0–2 | 1–2 | 2–0 | — |

Source: CONMEBOL

| 3 April 2024 1 | Sportivo Trinidense (Paraguay) | 0–2 | (Brazil) Fortaleza | Asunción, Paraguay |
| 20:00 UTC−4 | | Report | Thiago Galhardo 4'; Yago Pikachu 90+2' | Stadium: Estadio Defensores del Chaco; Attendance: 500; Referee: Francisco Gilabert (Chile) |

| 10 April 2024 2 | Fortaleza (Brazil) | 5–0 | (Bolivia) Nacional Potosí | Fortaleza, Brazil |
| 19:00 UTC−3 | Hércules 13'; Lucero 16', 29'; Yago Pikachu 48'; Machuca 58' | Report | | Stadium: Castelão; Attendance: 19,237; Referee: Augusto Aragón (Ecuador) |

| 25 April 2024 3 | Fortaleza (Brazil) | 4–2 | (Argentina) Boca Juniors | Fortaleza, Brazil |
| 21:00 UTC−3 | Lucero 4', 51'; Yago Pikachu 55', 63' | Report | Merentiel 21'; Zenón 85' | Stadium: Castelão; Attendance: 53,428; Referee: Wilmar Roldán (Colombia) |

| 8 May 2024 4 | Nacional Potosí (Bolivia) | 4–1 | (Brazil) Fortaleza | Potosí, Bolivia |
| 20:00 UTC−4 | Callejo 6'; Prost 37'; Guerra 70'; Álvarez 90+3' | Report | Lucero 16' | Stadium: Estadio Víctor Agustín Ugarte; Attendance: 1,401; Referee: Alex Cajas (Ecuador) |

| 15 May 2024 5 | Boca Juniors (Argentina) | 1–1 | (Brazil) Fortaleza | Buenos Aires, Argentina |
| 21:00 UTC−3 | Cavani 55' | Report | Andrade 90' | Stadium: La Bombonera; Attendance: 46,466; Referee: Jesús Valenzuela (Venezuela) |

| 29 May 2024 6 | Fortaleza (Brazil) | 2–1 | (Paraguay) Sportivo Trinidense | Fortaleza, Brazil |
| 21:00 UTC−3 | Pochettino 20'; Lucero 42' | Report | Rayer 90+3' | Stadium: Castelão; Attendance: 29,227; Referee: Augusto Aragón (Ecuador) |

==== Round of 16 ====
| 14 August 2024 First Leg | Rosario Central (Argentina) | 1–1 | (Brazil) Fortaleza | Rosario, Argentina |
| 19:00 UTC−3 | Sández 6' | Report | Marinho 2' | Stadium: Estadio Gigante de Arroyito; Attendance: 14,360; Referee: Alexis Herrera (Venezuela) |

| 21 August 2024 Second Leg | Fortaleza (Brazil) | 3–1 (4–2 agg.) | (Argentina) Rosario Central | Fortaleza, Brazil |
| 19:00 UTC−3 | Lucero 53'; Yago Pikachu 78'; Lucas Sasha 90+2' | Report | Mallo 48' | Stadium: Castelão; Attendance: 50,135; Referee: Esteban Ostojich (Uruguay) |

==== Quarterfinals ====
| 17 September 2024 First Leg | Fortaleza (Brazil) | 0–2 | (Brazil) Corinthians | Fortaleza, Brazil |
| 21:30 UTC−3 | | Report | Coronado 39'; Yuri Alberto 90' | Stadium: Castelão; Attendance: 46,617; Referee: Darío Herrera (Argentina) |

| 24 September 2024 Second Leg | Corinthians (Brazil) | 3–0 (5–0 agg.) | (Brazil) Fortaleza | São Paulo, Brazil |
| 21:30 UTC−3 | Romero 55'; Coronado 59'; Pedro Henrique 81' | Report | | Stadium: Neo Química Arena; Attendance: 44,680; Referee: Piero Maza (Chile) |
