= Calebe =

Brazilian footballer (born 2000)

Personal information
- Full name: Calebe Gonçalves Ferreira da Silva
- Date of birth: 30 April 2000 (age 26)
- Place of birth: Monte Azul Paulista, Brazil
- Height: 1.72 m (5 ft 8 in)
- Position: Midfielder

Team information
- Current team: Internacional (on loan from Fortaleza)
- Number: 30

Youth career
- 2015–2020: São Paulo
- 2019–2020: → Atlético Mineiro (loan)

Senior career*
Years	Team	Apps	(Gls)
2020–2021	São Paulo	0	(0)
2020–2021	→ Atlético Mineiro (loan)	12	(0)
2021–2023	Atlético Mineiro	40	(0)
2023–	Fortaleza	57	(7)
2025–2026	→ Alavés (loan)	18	(0)
2026–	→ Internacional (loan)	1	(0)
- * Club domestic league appearances and goals as of 27 May 2026

Calebe Gonçalves Ferreira da Silva (born 30 April 2000), known simply as Calebe, is a Brazilian professional footballer who plays as a midfielder for Internacional, on loan from Fortaleza.

== Club career ==
Born in Monte Azul Paulista, Calebe joined São Paulo's youth setup in 2015. He was named on the bench once for São Paulo's B side. He was a member of the Campeonato Brasileiro Sub-23 winning squad in 2018.

In 2019, Calebe joined Atlético Mineiro on loan until February 2021 with an option to buy. He won the 2019 Campeonato Mineiro with the U20s and received praises for his performances in the 2020 Copa São Paulo de Futebol Júnior from club legend Reinaldo.

On 2 September 2020, Calebe was promoted to Atlético's first team on a permanent basis. He made his professional debut exactly two months after, coming off the bench in a 3–0 away loss to Palmeiras in the Série A. On 1 March 2021, he signed a three-year contract with the club. On 7 March, he scored the second goal and assisted the third in a 4–0 Campeonato Mineiro win over Uberlândia, featuring on the scoresheet for the first time in his professional career.

On 8 February 2023, Calebe joined Fortaleza. He made his league debut against Ferroviário on 12 March 2023. Calebe scored his first league goal against Ferroviário on 19 March 2023, scoring in the 47th minute.

On 22 July 2025, Calebe moved abroad for the first time in his career, joining La Liga side Deportivo Alavés on a one-year loan deal.

== Career statistics ==
As of 25 July 2025.

Club	Season	League			State league (Note: Includes Campeonato Mineiro, Campeonato Cearense)		Cup (Note: Includes Copa do Brasil, Copa del Rey)		Continental		Other		Total	
Club	Season	Division	Apps	Goals	Apps	Goals	Apps	Goals	Apps	Goals	Apps	Goals	Apps	Goals
Atlético Mineiro	2020	Série A	11	0	—		—		—		—		11	0
Atlético Mineiro	2021	Série A	14	0	5	1	3	0	2 (Note: Appearance(s) in Copa Libertadores)	0	—		24	1
Atlético Mineiro	2022	Série A	13	0	6	1	3	0	5	0	—		27	1
Atlético Mineiro	2023	Série A	—		3	0	—		—		—		3	0
Atlético Mineiro	Total		38	0	14	2	6	0	7	0	—		65	2
Fortaleza	2023	Série A	29	2	4	2	3	0	13 (Note: Four appearances in Copa Libertadores, nine appearances and one goal in Copa Sudamericana)	1	6 (Note: Appearance(s) in Copa do Nordeste)	1	55	6
Fortaleza	2024	Série A	7	0	5	2	1	0	1 (Note: Appearance(s) in Copa Sudamericana)	0	4	0	18	2
Fortaleza	2025	Série A	7	1	5	0	2	0	3	0	8	0	25	1
Fortaleza	Total		43	3	14	4	6	0	17	1	18	1	98	9
Alavés (loan)	2025–26	La Liga	0	0	—		0	0	—		—		0	0
Career total			81	3	28	6	12	0	24	1	18	1	163	11

== Honours ==
Atlético Mineiro

- Campeonato Brasileiro Série A: 2021
- Copa do Brasil: 2021
- Campeonato Mineiro: 2020, 2021, 2022
- Supercopa do Brasil: 2022

Fortaleza

- Campeonato Cearense: 2023
- Copa do Nordeste: 2024

São Paulo (youth)

- Campeonato Brasileiro Sub-23: 2018
