= 2023 Fortaleza Esporte Clube season =

Fortaleza
2023 season
- Manager: Juan Pablo Vojvoda
- Stadium: Castelão
- Série A: 10th
- Campeonato Cearense: Winners
- Copa do Brasil: Round of 16
- Copa do Nordeste: Semi-finals
- Copa Sudamericana: Runners-up
- Top goalscorer: Juan Martín Lucero (9)
- Biggest win: Fortaleza 6–1 Atlético Cearense; Fortaleza 6–1 Águia de Marabá; Fortaleza 6–1 Estudiantes de Mérida
- Biggest defeat: Palmeiras 3–0 Fortaleza; Fortaleza 0–3 Red Bull Bragantino

The 2023 season was the 105th in the history of Fortaleza Esporte Clube, and the club's fifth consecutive season in the top flight of Brazilian football, the Campeonato Brasileiro Série A. In addition to the national league, Fortaleza participated in the Campeonato Cearense, the Copa do Brasil, the Copa do Nordeste, and the Copa Sudamericana.

== Transfers ==
=== In ===
Pos.	Player	Transferred to	Fee	Date	Source
DF	(Brazil) Dudu	(Brazil) Atlético Goianiense	Undisclosed	1 January 2023	
MF	(Brazil) Yago Pikachu	(Japan) Shimizu S-Pulse	Loan	1 January 2023	
GK	(Brazil) João Ricardo	(Brazil) Ceará	Undisclosed	1 January 2023	
DF	(Brazil) Bruno Pacheco	(Brazil) Ceará	Undisclosed	1 January 2023	
MF	(Brazil) Zé Welison	(Brazil) Atlético Mineiro	Undisclosed	1 January 2023	
MF	(Argentina) Tomás Pochettino	(United States) Austin FC	Undisclosed	6 January 2023	
FW	(Brazil) Thiago Galhardo	Unattached		10 January 2023	
FW	(Argentina) Juan Martín Lucero	(Chile) Colo-Colo	€900,000	13 January 2023	
MF	(Brazil) Guilherme	(Brazil) Grêmio	Loan	8 February 2023	
MF	(Brazil) Marinho	(Brazil) Flamengo	Free	1 July 2023	
DF	(Argentina) Gonzalo Escobar	(Spain) Ibiza	Free	3 July 2023	
DF	(Portugal) Tobias Figueiredo	(England) Hull City	Undisclosed	11 July 2023	
MF	(Brazil) Pedro Augusto	(Portugal) Tondela	Free	13 July 2023	
MF	(Argentina) Imanol Machuca	(Argentina) Union Santa Fe	€2,200,000	28 July 2023	

=== Out ===
Pos.	Player	Transferred to	Fee	Date	Source
MF	(Brazil) Romarinho	(Brazil) Sport Recife	€465,000	1 January 2023	

== Competitions ==
=== Overall record ===
Competition	First match	Last match	Starting round	Final position	Record							
Competition	First match	Last match	Starting round	Final position	Pld	W	D	L	GF	GA	GD	Win %
Série A	15 April 2023	7 December 2023	Matchday 1	10th	38	15	9	14	45	44	+1	39.47
Campeonato Cearense	14 January 2023	8 April 2023	First round	Winners	9	6	2	1	21	8	+13	66.67
Copa do Brasil	12 April 2023	31 May 2023	Third round	Round of 16	4	3	0	1	9	4	+5	75.00
Copa do Nordeste	21 January 2023	29 March 2023	Group stage	Semi-finals	10	7	0	3	21	8	+13	70.00
Copa Sudamericana	5 April 2025	28 October 2023	Group stage	Runners-up	13	9	3	1	28	10	+18	69.23
Total					74	40	14	20	124	74	+50	54.05

Source: Competitions

=== Campeonato Brasileiro Série A ===
==== League table ====
Pos	Team	Pld	W	D	L	GF	GA	GD	Pts	Qualification or relegation
8	Athletico Paranaense	38	14	14	10	51	43	+8	56	Qualification for Copa Sudamericana group stage
9	Internacional	38	15	10	13	46	45	+1	55	Qualification for Copa Sudamericana group stage
10	Fortaleza	38	15	9	14	45	44	+1	54	Qualification for Copa Sudamericana group stage
11	São Paulo	38	14	11	13	40	38	+2	53	Qualification for Copa Libertadores group stage (Note: São Paulo qualified for the Copa Libertadores group stage by winning the 2023 Copa do Brasil.)
12	Cuiabá	38	14	9	15	40	39	+1	51	Qualification for Copa Sudamericana group stage

Source: CBF
Rules for classification: 1) points; 2) wins; 3) goal difference; 4) goals scored; 5) head-to-head results (only between two teams); 6) fewest red cards; 7) fewest yellow cards; 8) drawing of lots.

==== Results summary ====
Overall								Home						Away					
Pld	W	D	L	GF	GA	GD	Pts	W	D	L	GF	GA	GD	W	D	L	GF	GA	GD
38	15	9	14	45	44	+1	54	9	6	4	28	20	+8	6	3	10	17	24	−7

==== Results by round ====
Round	1	2	3	4	5	6	7	8	9	10	11	12	13	14	15	16	17	18	19	20	21	22	23	24	25	26	27	28	29	30	31	32	33	34	35	36	37	38
Ground	H	A	H	A	H	A	A	H	H	A	A	H	A	H	H	A	H	A	H	A	H	A	H	A	H	H	A	A	H	H	A	H	A	A	H	A	H	A
Result	D	W	W	D	D	D	L	W	D	L	W	W	L	W	L	L	L	L	W	W	W	L	W	W	D	W	L	L	D	L	L	L	D	L	D	W	W	W
Position	10	3	2	4	6	7	11	8	9	11	10	8	10	7	9	9	11	13	11	8	8	8	8	8	9	6	8	8	9	9	9	9	11	11	12	11	10	10

A = Away; H = Home; W = Win; D = Draw; L = Loss

==== Matches ====
The match schedule was released on 15 February 2023.

15 April 2023 1	Fortaleza	1–1	Internacional

23 April 2023 2	Coritiba	0–3	Fortaleza

29 April 2023 3	Fortaleza	4–2	Fluminense

9 May 2023 4	Corinthians	1–1	Fortaleza

11 May 2023 5	Fortaleza	0–0	São Paulo

14 May 2023 6	Grêmio	0–0	Fortaleza

20 May 2023 7	América Mineiro	2–1	Fortaleza

27 May 2023 8	Fortaleza	2–0	Vasco da Gama

3 June 2023 9	Fortaleza	0–0	Bahia

11 June 2023 10	Botafogo	2–0	Fortaleza

21 June 2023 11	Cruzeiro	0–1	Fortaleza

24 June 2023 12	Fortaleza	2–1	Atlético Mineiro

1 July 2023 13	Flamengo	2–0	Fortaleza

9 July 2023 14	Fortaleza	1–0	Athletico Paranaense

16 July 2023 15	Fortaleza	0–1	Cuiabá

22 July 2023 16	Palmeiras	3–1	Fortaleza

29 July 2023 17	Fortaleza	0–3	Red Bull Bragantino

5 August 2023 18	Goiás	1–0	Fortaleza

13 August 2023 19	Fortaleza	4–0	Santos

19 August 2023 20	Internacional	0–1	Fortaleza

27 August 2023 21	Fortaleza	3–1	Coritiba

3 September 2023 22	Fluminense	1–0	Fortaleza

14 September 2023 23	Fortaleza	2–1	Corinthians

21 September 2023 24	São Paulo	1–2	Fortaleza

30 September 2023 25	Fortaleza	1–1	Grêmio

8 October 2023 26	Fortaleza	3–2	América Mineiro

18 October 2023 27	Vasco da Gama	1–0	Fortaleza

21 October 2023 28	Bahia	2–0	Fortaleza

2 November 2023 31	Atlético Mineiro	3–1	Fortaleza

5 November 2023 32	Fortaleza	0–2	Flamengo

8 November 2023 33	Athletico Paranaense	1–1	Fortaleza

12 November 2023 34	Cuiabá	2–1	Fortaleza

18 November 2023 30	Fortaleza	0–1	Cruzeiro

23 November 2023 29	Fortaleza	2–2	Botafogo

26 November 2023 25	Fortaleza	2–2	Palmeiras

30 November 2023 36	Red Bull Bragantino	1–2	Fortaleza

3 December 2023 37	Fortaleza	1–0	Goiás

7 December 2023 38	Santos	1–2	Fortaleza

=== Campeonato Cearense ===
==== First round ====
===== Results by round =====
Round	1	2	3	4	5
Ground	H	H	A	H	A
Result	W	W	W	W	L
Position	2	1	1	1	1

A = Away; H = Home; W = Win; D = Draw; L = Loss

14 January 2023 1	Fortaleza	2–0	Iguatu

18 January 2023 2	Fortaleza	1–0	Caucaia

29 January 2023 3	Barbalha	1–2	Fortaleza

1 February 2023 4	Fortaleza	6–1	Atlético Cearense

8 February 2023 5	Ceará	2–1	Fortaleza

===== Semi-finals =====
12 March 2023 First leg	Ferroviário	1–1	Fortaleza

19 March 2023 Second leg	Fortaleza	4–0 (5–1 agg.)	Ferroviário

===== Finals =====
1 April 2023 First leg	Fortaleza	2–1	Ceará

8 April 2023 Second leg	Ceará	2–2 (3–4 agg.)	Fortaleza

=== Copa do Brasil ===
==== Third round ====
12 April 2023 First leg	Fortaleza	6–1	Águia de Marabá

26 April 2023 Second leg	Águia de Marabá	0–2 (1–8 agg.)	Fortaleza

==== Third round ====
17 May 2023 First leg	Palmeiras	3–0	Fortaleza

31 May 2023 Second leg	Fortaleza	1–0 (1–3 agg.)	Palmeiras

=== Copa do Nordeste ===
21 January 2023 1	Fortaleza	2–0	Campinense

27 January 2023 5	Fortaleza	1–0	Sergipe

4 February 2023 2	ABC	2–0	Fortaleza

14 February 2023 3	Bahia	0–3	Fortaleza

17 February 2023 4	Fortaleza	3–0	CSA

26 February 2023 7	Fortaleza	2–1	Náutico

5 March 2023 6	Ceará	2–0	Fortaleza

22 March 2023 8	Santa Cruz	0–4	Fortaleza

==== Play-offs ====
25 March 2023 Quarter-finals	Fortaleza	4–0	Ferroviário

29 March 2023 Semi-finals	Fortaleza	2–3	Ceará	Fortaleza
				Stadium: Castelão; Attendance: 31,929; Referee: Araujo M.

=== Copa Sudamericana ===
==== Group stage ====
The draw was held on 27 March 2023.

Group H

5 April 2023 1	Fortaleza (Brazil)	4–0	(Chile) Palestino

20 April 2023 2	San Lorenzo (Argentina)	0–2	(Brazil) Fortaleza

4 May 2023 3	Fortaleza (Brazil)	6–1	(Venezuela) Estudiantes de Mérida

24 May 2023 4	Fortaleza (Brazil)	3–2	(Argentina) San Lorenzo

6 June 2023 5	Estudiantes de Mérida (Venezuela)	1–0	(Brazil) Fortaleza

27 June 2023 6	Palestino (Chile)	1–2	(Brazil) Fortaleza

==== Round of 16 ====
1 August 2023 First leg	Libertad (Paraguay)	0–1	(Brazil) Fortaleza

8 August 2023 Second leg	Fortaleza (Brazil)	1–1 (2–1 agg.)	(Paraguay) Libertad

==== Quarter-finals ====
24 August 2023 First leg	América Mineiro (Brazil)	1–3	(Brazil) Fortaleza	Belo Horizonte
	Mastriani 69'		Guilherme Augusto 15', 41'; Pochettino 21'	Stadium: Arena Independência; Attendance: 3,301; Referee: Wilmar Roldán (Colombia)

31 August 2023 Second leg	Fortaleza (Brazil)	2–1 (5–2 agg.)	(Brazil) América Mineiro	Fortaleza
19:00 UTC−3	Guilherme Augusto 22'; Marinho 66'		Breno Cascardo 89'	Stadium: Castelão; Attendance: 56,916; Referee: Felipe Andres Gonzalez Alveal

==== Semi-finals ====
26 September 2023 First leg	Corinthians (Brazil)	1–1	(Brazil) Fortaleza	São Paulo
21:30 UTC−3	Yuri Alberto 40'		José Welison 22'	Stadium: Neo Química Arena; Attendance: 42,196; Referee: Esteban Ostojich

3 October 2023 Second leg	Fortaleza (Brazil)	2–0 (3–1 agg.)	(Brazil) Corinthians	Fortaleza
21:30 UTC−3	Yago Pikachu 49'; Tinga 55'			Stadium: Castelão; Attendance: 60,151; Referee: Andrés Rojas

==== Final ====
28 October 2023 Final	Fortaleza (Brazil)	1–1 (a.e.t.) (3–4 p)	(Ecuador) LDU Quito	Maldonado, Uruguay
16:00 UTC−3	Lucero 48'		Alzugaray 56'	Stadium: Estadio Domingo Burgueño; Referee: Jesús Valenzuela (Venezuela)
