= Marinho (footballer, born 1990) =

Brazilian footballer (born 1990)

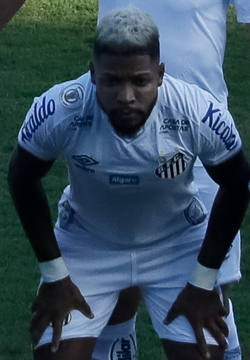
- Marinho with Santos in 2019

Personal information
- Full name: Mário Sérgio Santos Costa
- Date of birth: 29 May 1990 (age 36)
- Place of birth: Penedo, Brazil
- Height: 1.69 m (5 ft 7 in)
- Position: Forward

Team information
- Current team: Vitória
- Number: 7

Youth career
- 2004–2005: Penedense
- 2005–2007: Corinthians-AL
- 2008: Santos
- 2008: Fluminense

Senior career*
Years	Team	Apps	(Gls)
2008	Fluminense	9	(0)
2009–2013	Internacional	5	(0)
2011	→ Caxias (loan)	5	(0)
2011	→ Paraná (loan)	7	(2)
2012	→ Goiás (loan)	13	(1)
2013	→ Ituano (loan)	11	(1)
2014	Náutico	21	(2)
2015	Ceará	17	(6)
2015–2016	Cruzeiro	12	(1)
2016	→ Vitória (loan)	15	(5)
2016	Vitória	22	(10)
2017–2018	Changchun Yatai	22	(3)
2018–2019	Grêmio	23	(5)
2019–2022	Santos	89	(34)
2022–2023	Flamengo	48	(5)
2023–2025	Fortaleza	75	(10)
2026–	Vitória	7	(0)
- * Club domestic league appearances and goals as of 8 April 2026

Mário Sérgio Santos Costa (born 29 May 1990), commonly known as Marinho (Brazilian Portuguese: [maˈɾiɲu]), is a Brazilian professional footballer who plays as a forward for Campeonato Brasileiro Série A club Vitória.

Marinho began his career at Fluminense, and subsequently represented several teams in his home country before impressing with Vitória in 2016. He then moved to Chinese club Changchun Yatai in 2017, but returned to Brazil in the following year with Grêmio. After moving to Santos in 2019, he enjoyed a prolific 2020 season, earning several individual awards such as the South American Footballer of the Year. In 2022, he moved to Flamengo.

== Career ==
=== Early career ===
Marinho was born in Penedo, Alagoas, and played for Penedense, Corinthians-AL and Fluminense's youth categories. He made his first team debut on 30 March 2008, coming on as a second half substitute for David in a 1–3 home loss against Botafogo for the Campeonato Carioca championship. His first Série A match occurred on 11 May, replacing Tartá in a 0–0 away draw against Atlético Mineiro.

=== Internacional and loans ===
On 30 December 2008, Marinho signed a five-year deal with fellow top tier club Internacional. Making his debut the following 5 February in a 4–1 Campeonato Gaúcho home routing of Canoas, he was only used rarely during his spell at the club.

In 2011, Marinho served loan stints at Caxias and Paraná, respectively. He scored his first senior goal with the latter on 22 October, in a 3–4 Série B loss at Ponte Preta.

Marinho was again loaned out in the following years, representing Goiás in 2012 and Ituano in 2013.

=== Náutico and Ceará ===
On 8 January 2014, Marinho signed permanently for Náutico. He was sparingly used during his time at the club, scoring his first goal for Timbu in a 3–1 win at Salgueiro for the Campeonato Pernambucano on 27 March.

On 23 December 2014, Marinho's agent confirmed his agreement with Ceará for the following campaign. He scored his first goal for the club on 11 March 2015, the game's only in a Copa do Nordeste home success over Ríver.

Marinho scored two goals in his first four league matches for Vovô. In his fifth, a 3–3 home draw against Santa Cruz, he scored a double, but gained national recognition due to his live post-match interview, where he said a bad word after knowing he was suspended for the following match due to a celebration in one of the goals and became a national meme.

=== Cruzeiro ===
On 26 June 2015, after his notable interview, Marinho was touted to a possible move to Cruzeiro in the main category. Three days later he agreed to a three-year contract at the club, for a fee of R$ 1.2 million for 50% of his federative rights.

Marinho made his debut for the club on 4 July 2015, replacing Marquinhos and scoring the last in a 2–0 home win against Atlético Paranaense. However, he failed to find the net in the following eleven matches for the club.

=== Vitória ===
On 25 January 2016, Marinho signed a one-year loan deal with newly promoted Vitória. He made his debut for the club five days later, scoring in a 3–0 home win against Jacuipense.

One of the club's key units during the first half of the campaign, Marinho signed a permanent contract with Vitória on 18 June 2016. On 6 November, he scored a brace in a 3–2 home win against Atlético Paranaense.

=== Changchun Yatai ===
On 21 January 2017, Marinho was presented at Chinese Super League side Changchun Yatai, for a rumoured fee of R$ 17 million. He struggled to adapt at the club, scoring only three goals in 22 appearances.

=== Grêmio ===
On 28 June 2018, Marinho returned to Brazil and signed a three-and-a-half-year contract with Grêmio. An immediate backup to starting trio Luan, Everton and Jael, he fell further down the pecking order after the arrivals of Diego Tardelli, André and Felipe Vizeu.

=== Santos ===
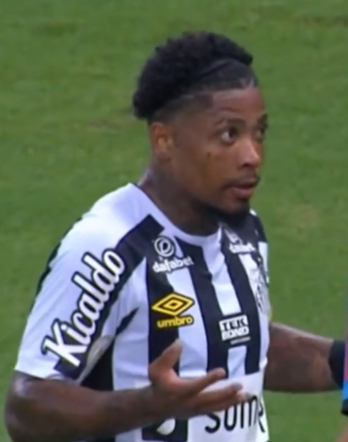
Marinho with Santos in 2021

On 25 May 2019, Marinho signed for Santos until December 2022, with David Braz moving in the opposite direction. He made his debut for the club on 2 June, replacing goalscorer Eduardo Sasha in a 1–0 away defeat of former club Ceará.

Marinho scored his first goal for Peixe on 21 July 2019, netting the game's only in an away defeat of Botafogo. After spending the first months of the 2020 campaign sidelined due to a fractured foot, he scored a career-best 22 goals in the year, being the club's top goalscorer.

On 24 February 2021, Marinho tested positive for COVID-19, being sidelined for the last round of the season and for the start of the 2021 Campeonato Paulista.

=== Flamengo ===
On 28 January 2022, Marinho was announced as the new signing of Flamengo, agreeing to a two-year deal.

=== Returning to Vitória ===
On January 25, 2025, Marinho was seen at the Barradão stadium watching a BAVI (Bahia vs. Vitória derby). This appearance caused a stir on social media, and on January 27, Esporte Club Vitória officially announced the signing of the footballer.

== Career statistics ==
As of match played 31 December 2025

Appearances and goals by club, season and competition
Club	Season	League			State League		Cup		Continental		Other		Total	
Club	Season	Division	Apps	Goals	Apps	Goals	Apps	Goals	Apps	Goals	Apps	Goals	Apps	Goals
Fluminense	2008	Série A	8	0	1	0	0	0	—		—		9	0
Internacional	2009	Série A	0	0	1	0	0	0	—		—		1	0
Internacional	2010	Série A	0	0	1	0	0	0	—		—		1	0
Internacional	2011	Série A	0	0	3	0	0	0	—		—		3	0
Internacional	Total		0	0	5	0	0	0	—		—		5	0
Caxias (loan)	2011	Série C	5	0	—		—		—		—		5	0
Paraná (loan)	2011	Série B	7	2	—		—		—		—		7	2
Goiás (loan)	2012	Série B	2	0	11	1	4	0	—		—		17	1
Ituano (loan)	2013	Paulista	—		11	1	—		—		—		11	1
Náutico	2014	Série B	17	1	4	1	1	0	—		2 (Note: Appearance(s) in Copa do Nordeste)	0	24	2
Ceará	2015	Série B	5	4	12	2	3	1	—		9	2	29	9
Cruzeiro	2015	Série A	12	1	—		—		—		—		12	1
Vitória	2016	Série A	27	12	10	3	4	6	2 (Note: Appearance(s) in Copa Sudamericana)	0	—		43	21
Changchun Yatai	2017	Chinese Super League	17	3	—		0	0	—		—		17	3
Changchun Yatai	2018	Chinese Super League	5	0	—		0	0	—		—		5	0
Changchun Yatai	Total		22	3	—		0	0	—		—		22	3
Grêmio	2018	Série A	13	1	—		2	0	1 (Note: Appearance(s) in Copa Libertadores)	0	—		16	1
Grêmio	2019	Série A	2	0	8	4	0	0	2	0	—		12	4
Grêmio	Total		15	1	8	4	2	0	3	0	—		28	5
Santos	2019	Série A	27	8	—		1	0	—		—		28	8
Santos	2020	Série A	27	17	4	3	2	0	10	4	—		43	24
Santos	2021	Série A	27	6	4	0	4	1	7 (Note: Five appearances and two goals in Copa Libertadores, two appearances in Copa Sudamericana)	2	—		42	9
Santos	Total		81	31	8	3	7	1	17	6	—		113	41
Flamengo	2022	Série A	25	4	11	1	3	0	5	1	0	0	44	6
Flamengo	2023	Série A	4	0	7	0	2	0	2	0	1 (Note: Appearances in Recopa Sudamericana)	0	16	0
Flamengo	Total		29	4	18	1	5	0	7	1	1	0	60	6
Fortaleza	2023	Série A	21	2	—		—		5	2	—		26	4
Fortaleza	2024	Série A	23	4	1	1	4	1	5	1	8 (Note: Appearances in Copa do Nordeste)	1	41	8
Fortaleza	2025	Série A	17	1	7	2	2	0	7	1	5	0	38	4
Fortaleza	Total		61	7	8	3	6	1	17	4	13	1	105	16
Career total			291	66	96	19	32	9	46	11	25	5	490	108

== Honours ==
Internacional

- Campeonato Gaúcho: 2009

Grêmio

- Campeonato Gaúcho: 2019

Goiás

- Campeonato Goiano: 2012
- Campeonato Brasileiro Série B: 2012

Ceará

- Copa do Nordeste: 2015

Vitória

- Campeonato Baiano: 2016

Flamengo

- Copa do Brasil: 2022
- Copa Libertadores: 2022

Fortaleza

- Copa do Nordeste: 2024

Individual

- Campeonato Baiano Best Player: 2016
- Campeonato Baiano Team of the Year: 2016
- Copa do Brasil Top scorer: 2016
- Campeonato Brasileiro Série A Player of the Month: September 2020
- Campeonato Brasileiro Série A Team of the Year: 2020
- Bola de Prata: 2020
- Troféu Mesa Redonda Best Player: 2020
- Best Forward in Brazil: 2020
- Copa Libertadores Best Player: 2020
- Copa Libertadores Team of the Tournament: 2020
- South American Footballer of the Year: 2020
