= Moisés (footballer, born 1996) =

Brazilian footballer

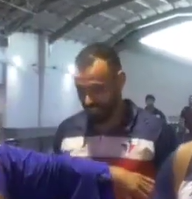
- Moisés as a player of Fortaleza in 2024

Personal information
- Full name: Moisés Vieira da Veiga
- Date of birth: 2 September 1996 (age 30)
- Place of birth: Morro da Fumaça, Brazil
- Height: 1.75 m (5 ft 9 in)
- Position: Winger

Team information
- Current team: Santos
- Number: 21

Senior career*
Years	Team	Apps	(Gls)
2019	Hercílio Luz	11	(1)
2019	→ Concórdia (loan)	19	(7)
2019–2021	Concórdia	9	(3)
2019	→ Brusque (loan)	0	(0)
2020–2021	→ Ponte Preta (loan)	41	(9)
2021	Ponte Preta	42	(9)
2022–2023	Fortaleza	52	(12)
2024	Cruz Azul	17	(1)
2024–2026	Fortaleza	61	(11)
2026–	Santos	15	(3)
- * Club domestic league appearances and goals as of 23:48, 24 May 2026 (UTC)

Moisés Vieira da Veiga (born 2 September 1996), simply known as Moisés, is a Brazilian footballer who plays as a winger for Campeonato Brasileiro Série A club Santos.

== Career ==
=== Early career ===
Born in Morro da Fumaça, Santa Catarina, Moisés played amateur football until joining Hercílio Luz in 2019. He appeared in his first senior match on 16 January of that year, playing the last five minutes of a 2–2 Campeonato Catarinense away draw against Atlético Tubarão; he scored his first goal ten days later, in a 4–0 home routing of Metropolitano.

After being mainly used as a substitute, Moisés was loaned to Concórdia for the second division of the Catarinense. After achieving promotion to the top tier and being the top goalscorer of the tournament, he signed a permanent contract with the club.

On 23 September 2019, Moisés moved to Brusque on loan for the year's Copa Santa Catarina. He returned to his parent club in December, after lifting the trophy and being again the top goalscorer, and renewed his contract with Concórdia until 2022 on 5 June 2020.

=== Ponte Preta ===
On 26 June 2020, Moisés agreed to a loan deal with Série B side Ponte Preta until April 2021. Initially a backup option, he started to feature regularly during the 2020 Série B, and scored a hat-trick in a 7–2 away success over Figueirense on 29 January 2021. On 3 May, Ponte signed him permanently on a contract until 2024.

=== Fortaleza ===
On 22 January 2022, Série A side Fortaleza announced the signing of Moisés on a three-year contract, after the club acquired 90% of his economic rights. He made his debut in the category on 10 April, in a 1–0 home loss to Cuiabá, and scored his first top tier goal on 15 May, in a 3–1 defeat to Botafogo.

Regularly used, Moisés renewed his link with Laion until December 2025 on 2 May 2023.

=== Cruz Azul ===
On 31 May 2023, Moisés moved abroad for the first time in his career, joining Liga MX side Cruz Azul for a rumoured fee of US$ 4.8 million, becoming the biggest sale of a club from the Northeast Region.

=== Fortaleza return ===
On 28 December 2023, Fortaleza announced the return of Moisés to the club on a contract until December 2027; the club bought him back for a fee of US$ 3.8 million, although 1.8 million were deducted to end Cruz Azul's debt with Fortaleza. A regular starter in the 2024 season, he struggled with injuries during half of the 2025 campaign.

=== Santos ===
On 11 February 2026, Santos announced the signing of Moisés on a three-year deal. He made his debut for the club the following day, replacing Miguel Terceros in a 2–1 away loss to Athletico Paranaense.

Moisés scored his first goal for Peixe on 15 February 2026, netting his team's second in a 6–0 Campeonato Paulista home routing of Velo Clube.

== Career statistics ==
As of 8 September 2026

Club	Season	League			State League		Cup		Continental		Other		Total	
Club	Season	Division	Apps	Goals	Apps	Goals	Apps	Goals	Apps	Goals	Apps	Goals	Apps	Goals
Hercílio Luz	2019	Série D	1	0	10	1	—		—		—		11	1
Concórdia (loan)	2019	Catarinense Série B	—		19	7	—		—		—		19	7
Brusque (loan)	2019	Série D	—		—		—		—		11 (Note: Appearance(s) in Copa Santa Catarina)	9	11	9
Concórdia	2020	Catarinense	—		9	3	—		—		—		9	3
Ponte Preta	2020	Série B	28	4	4	1	3	1	—		—		35	6
Ponte Preta	2021	Série B	37	7	14	6	2	0	—		—		53	13
Ponte Preta	Total		65	11	18	7	5	1	—		—		88	19
Fortaleza	2022	Série A	37	7	6	2	5	1	8 (Note: Appearance(s) in Copa Libertadores)	3	10 (Note: Appearance(s) in Copa do Nordeste)	3	66	16
Fortaleza	2023	Série A	6	3	3	0	3	0	4 (Note: Appearance(s) in Copa Sudamericana)	1	3	1	19	5
Fortaleza	Total		43	10	9	2	8	1	12	4	13	4	85	21
Cruz Azul	2023–24	Liga MX	17	1	—		—		—		3 (Note: Appearance(s) in Leagues Cup)	1	20	2
Fortaleza	2024	Série A	26	7	9	3	3	0	6	0	10	7	54	17
Fortaleza	2025	Série A	12	0	8	1	0	0	1	0	7	3	28	4
Fortaleza	2026	Série B	—		6	0	—		—		—		6	0
Fortaleza	Total		38	7	23	4	3	0	7	0	17	10	88	21
Santos	2026	Série A	13	2	2	1	2	0	4	0	—		21	3
Career total			177	31	90	25	18	2	23	4	44	24	352	86

== Títulos ==
Brusque

- Copa Santa Catarina: 2019

Fortaleza

- Copa do Nordeste: 2022, 2024
- Campeonato Cearense: 2022, 2023

Individual

- Campeonato Catarinense Série B top scorer: 2019
- Copa Santa Catarina top scorer: 2019
- Copa do Nordeste top scorer: 2024
