= Tomás Cardona =

Argentinian association football player

Personal information
- Full name: Tomás Cardona Bernaschina
- Date of birth: 10 October 1995 (age 31)
- Place of birth: Buenos Aires, Argentina
- Height: 1.88 m (6 ft 2 in)
- Position: Centre-back

Team information
- Current team: Fortaleza
- Number: 6

Youth career
- 2005–2015: San Lorenzo

Senior career*
Years	Team	Apps	(Gls)
2015–2017	San Lorenzo	0	(0)
2016–2017	→ Defensa y Justicia (loan)	20	(1)
2017–2021	Godoy Cruz	56	(3)
2020–2021	→ Las Palmas (loan)	10	(0)
2021–2023	Defensa y Justicia	49	(3)
2024–	Fortaleza	29	(1)
2025	→ Talleres (loan)	2	(0)
2025	→ Tigre (loan)	11	(0)
- * Club domestic league appearances and goals as of 15 April 2026

Tomás Cardona Bernaschina (born 10 October 1995) is an Argentine professional footballer who plays as a centre-back for Fortaleza.

== Club career ==
Born in Buenos Aires, Cardona was a San Lorenzo youth graduate. He made his first team debut on 21 May 2015, starting and scoring his team's third in a 3–0 Copa Argentina home win against Viale FC María Grande.

On 20 January 2016, Cardona was loaned to fellow Primera División side Defensa y Justicia for six months. He made his top tier debut on 7 February by playing the last 26 minutes in a 2–2 home draw against Unión de Santa Fe, and scored his first goal in the category on 4 March by netting the opener in a 5–1 away routing of Argentinos Juniors.

Cardona's loan was later extended for the 2016–17 season, and he later signed for Godoy Cruz on 24 July 2017. He later became a regular starter at the club.

Cardona moved abroad on 27 August 2020, after agreeing to a one-year loan deal with Spanish Segunda División side UD Las Palmas.

On 6 July 2021, Cardona joined Defensa y Justicia on a deal until the end of 2024.

== Career statistics ==
As of match played on 12 April 2023

Club statistics
Club	Season	League			National Cup		Other		Total	
Club	Season	Division	Apps	Goals	Apps	Goals	Apps	Goals	Apps	Goals
San Lorenzo	2015	Argentine Primera División	0	0	1	0	—		1	0
Defensa y Justicia (loan)	2016	Argentine Primera División	7	1	2	0	—		9	1
Defensa y Justicia (loan)	2016–17	Argentine Primera División	13	0	0	0	2 (Note: Appearances in the Copa Sudamericana)	0	15	0
Defensa y Justicia (loan)	Defensa y Justicia totals		20	1	2	0	2	0	24	1
Godoy Cruz	2016–17	Argentine Primera División	0	0	1	0	—		1	0
Godoy Cruz	2017–18	Argentine Primera División	19	2	0	0	—		19	2
Godoy Cruz	2018–19	Argentine Primera División	21	1	3	0	12 (Note: Eight appearances in the Copa Libertadores and Four appearances in the Copa de la Superliga)	2	36	3
Godoy Cruz	2019–20	Argentine Primera División	16	0	0	0	—		16	0
Godoy Cruz	Godoy Cruz totals		56	3	4	0	12	2	72	5
Las Palmas (loan)	2020–21	Segunda División	10	0	1	0	—		11	0
Defensa y Justicia	2021	Argentine Primera División	4	0	0	0	2 (Note: Appearances in the Copa Libertadores)	0	6	0
Defensa y Justicia	2022	Argentine Primera División	12	0	1	0	4 (Note: Two appearances in the Copa Sudamericana and One appearance in the Copa de la Liga Profesional)	0	18	0
Defensa y Justicia	2023	Argentine Primera División	11	1	1	0	1 (Note: Appearance in the Copa Sudamericana)	0	13	1
Defensa y Justicia	Defensa y Justicia totals		27	1	2	0	7	0	37	1
Career totals			113	5	10	0	21	2	145	7

== Honours ==
Fortaleza

- Copa do Nordeste: 2024
- Campeonato Cearense: 2026
