= Kauan (footballer) =

Brazilian footballer

Personal information
- Full name: Kauan Rodrigues da Silva
- Date of birth: 16 April 2005 (age 21)
- Place of birth: Caxias, Brazil
- Height: 1.72 m (5 ft 8 in)
- Position: Midfielder

Team information
- Current team: Athletic Club (MG) (on loan from Fortaleza)

Youth career
- 2017–2023: Goiás

Senior career*
Years	Team	Apps	(Gls)
2022–2023	Goiás	7	(2)
2023–	Fortaleza	11	(1)
2025	→ Atlético Goianiense (loan)	35	(3)
2026–	→ Athletic Club (MG) (loan)	38	(4)
Medal record
Men's football
Representing Brazil
South American U-20 Championship
Winner	2025 Venezuela
- * Club domestic league appearances and goals as of 18 November 2026

Kauan Rodrigues da Silva (born 16 April 2005) is a Brazilian footballer who plays as a midfielder for Athletic Club (MG), on loan from Fortaleza.

== Club career ==
=== Goiás ===
Born in Caxias, Maranhão, Kauan moved to Pará as a child. He moved to Goiânia following a trial with Goiás, joining the club in 2017. Following impressive performances for Goiás' youth team, he made his debut in the 2022 season, playing the entirety of a 2–2 penalty Copa Verde loss to Real Noroeste.

He was promoted to the first team for the 2023 season, where his career got off to a good start, scoring on his third appearance in the Campeonato Goiano, the first goal in a 2–0 win over Goianésia on 8 February 2023. He scored his second goal, and notched two assists, in an 8–3 win over Goiânia in the Campeonato Goiano quarter-finals.

Regularly used by head coach Guto Ferreira, Kauan was sent back to the under-20 squad in March 2023, after failing to agree to a new contract.

=== Fortaleza ===
On 3 May 2023, Goiás announced the transfer of Kauan to fellow Série A side Fortaleza.

== Career statistics ==
As of 4 May 2023

Appearances and goals by club, season and competition
Club	Season	League			State League		Cup		Continental		Other		Total	
Club	Season	Division	Apps	Goals	Apps	Goals	Apps	Goals	Apps	Goals	Apps	Goals	Apps	Goals
Goiás	2022	Série A	0	0	0	0	0	0	—		1 (Note: Appearances in the Copa Verde)	0	1	0
Goiás	2023	Série A	0	0	7 (Note: Appearances in the Campeonato Goiano)	2	2 (Note: Appearances in the Copa do Brasil)	0	0	0	1	0	10	2
Goiás	Total		0	0	7	2	2	0	0	0	2	0	11	2
Fortaleza	2023	Série A	0	0	—		—		—		—		0	0
Career total			0	0	7	2	2	0	0	0	2	0	11	2

== Honours ==
Fortaleza

- Copa do Nordeste: 2024

Brazil U20

- South American U-20 Championship: 2025
