= Bruno Pacheco =

Brazilian footballer (born 1991)

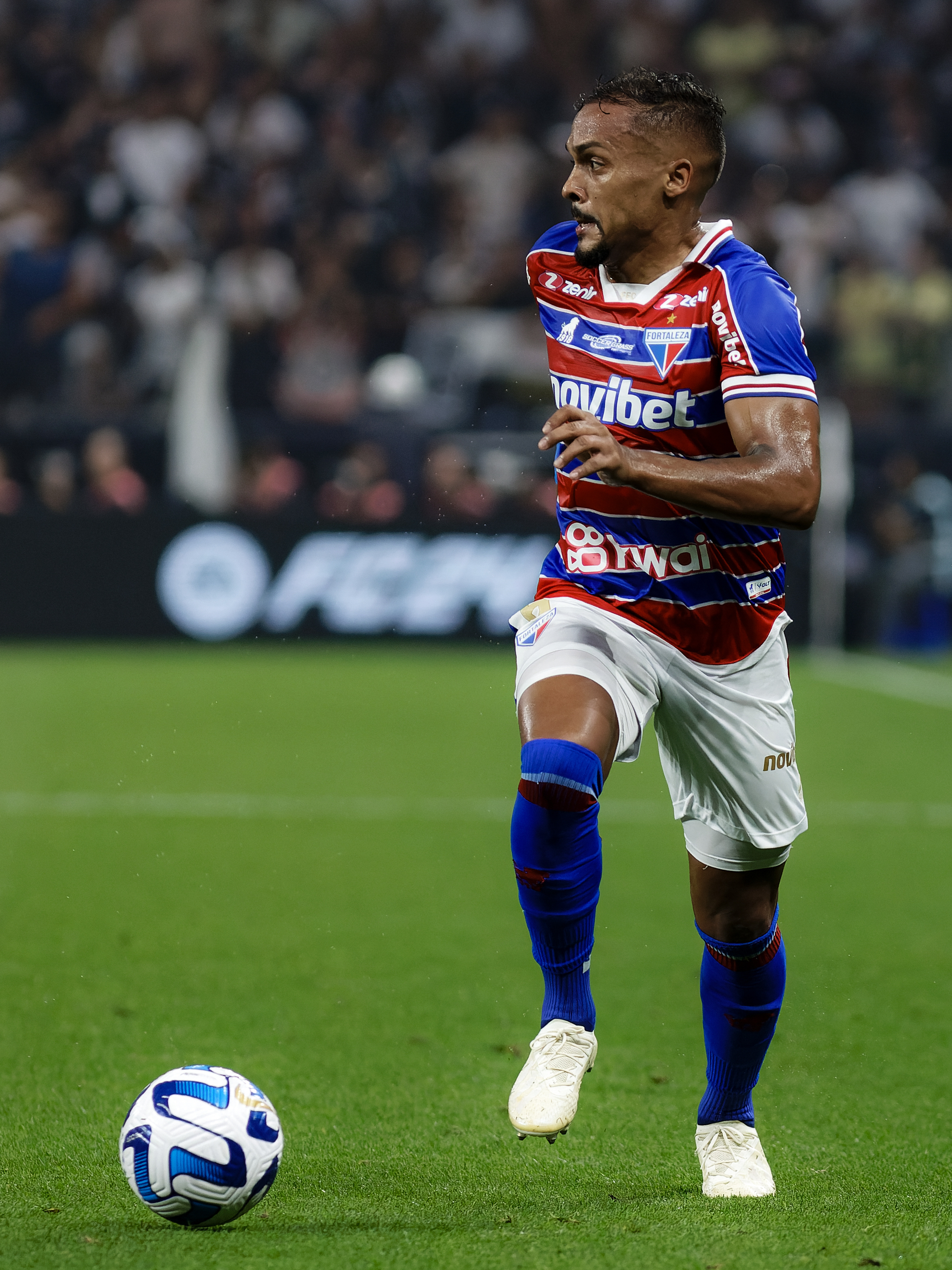
- Bruno Pacheco with Fortaleza in 2023

Personal information
- Full name: Bruno de Jesus Pacheco
- Date of birth: 8 December 1991 (age 34)
- Place of birth: Pitangueiras, Brazil
- Height: 1.75 m (5 ft 9 in)
- Position: Left back

Team information
- Current team: Chapecoense
- Number: 91

Youth career
- 2010: Ferroviária

Senior career*
Years	Team	Apps	(Gls)
2011–2012	Ferroviária	10	(0)
2011	→ Ivinhema (loan)	10	(0)
2013	Inter de Limeira	20	(2)
2013	São Bento	0	(0)
2014	Ipatinga	5	(0)
2014	Vitória da Conquista	0	(0)
2015	Guarani	25	(17)
2016	Bragantino	53	(7)
2017	Atlético Goianiense	42	(32)
2018–2019	Chapecoense	88	(2)
2020–2022	Ceará	62	(0)
2023–2025	Fortaleza	85	(4)
2026–	Chapecoense	2	(0)
- * Club domestic league appearances and goals as of 9 April 2026

Bruno de Jesus Pacheco (born 8 December 1991), known as Bruno Pacheco, is a Brazilian footballer, currently plays for Chapecoense.

He was known as Tatá in the beginning of his career.

== Career statistics ==
As of 25 October 2021

Club	Season	League			State League		Cup		Continental		Other		Total	
Club	Season	Division	Apps	Goals	Apps	Goals	Apps	Goals	Apps	Goals	Apps	Goals	Apps	Goals
Ivinhema	2011	Sul-Mato-Grossense	—		10	0	—		—		—		10	0
Ferroviária	2012	Paulista A2	—		10	0	—		—		—		10	0
Inter de Limeira	2013	Paulista A3	—		20	2	—		—		—		20	2
São Bento	2013	Paulista A3	—		—		—		—		14 (Note: All appearance(s) in Copa Paulista)	1	14	1
Ipatinga	2014	Série D	0	0	5	0	—		—		—		5	0
Vitória da Conquista	2014	Série D	0	0	—		—		—		—		0	0
Guarani	2015	Série C	11	0	14	1	—		—		—		25	1
Bragantino	2016	Série B	32	1	21	0	5	1	—		—		58	2
Atlético Goianiense	2017	Série A	29	0	13	0	2	0	—		—		44	0
Chapecoense	2018	Série A	30	0	13	0	4	0	2 (Note: All appearance(s) in Copa Libertadores)	0	—		49	0
Chapecoense	2019	Série A	33	0	12	0	6	0	2 (Note: All appearance(s) in Copa Sudamericana)	0	—		53	0
Chapecoense	Total		63	0	25	0	10	0	4	0	—		102	0
Ceará	2020	Série A	29	0	7	0	10	0	—		11 (Note: All appearance(s) in Copa do Nordeste)	0	57	0
Ceará	2021	Série A	24	0	2	0	2	0	5	0	4	0	37	0
Ceará	Total		53	0	9	0	12	0	5	0	15	0	94	0
Career total			188	1	127	3	29	1	9	0	29	1	382	6

== Honours ==
Ceará

- Copa do Nordeste: 2020

Fortaleza

- Campeonato Cearense: 2023
- Copa do Nordeste: 2024
