= Hércules (footballer, born 2000) =

Brazilian footballer

- Hércules with Fluminense in 2025

Personal information
- Full name: Hércules Pereira do Nascimento
- Date of birth: 20 October 2000 (age 26)
- Place of birth: Jaicós, Brazil
- Height: 1.78 m (5 ft 10 in)
- Position: Midfielder

Team information
- Current team: Fluminense
- Number: 35

Youth career
- 2016: EC São Bernardo
- 2019: Tiradentes-CE
- 2019–2020: Atlético Cearense

Senior career*
Years	Team	Apps	(Gls)
2019	Tiradentes-CE	1	(0)
2020–2021	Atlético Cearense	17	(0)
2020	→ Crato (loan)	10	(0)
2022–2024	Fortaleza	89	(11)
2025–	Fluminense	57	(6)
- * Club domestic league appearances and goals as of 6 April 2026

Hércules Pereira do Nascimento (born 20 October 2000), simply known as Hércules, is a Brazilian professional footballer who plays as a midfielder for Fluminense.

== Club career ==
=== Early career ===
Born in Jaicós, Piauí, Hércules began his career with São Bernardo in 2016, staying eight months at the club before opting to leave due to homesickness. In 2019, Hércules played for the under-20 side of Tiradentes-CE before making his senior debut on 1 June 2019, in a 1–2 Campeonato Cearense Segunda Divisão away loss against Crato. Later in the year, he joined Atlético Cearense and returned to the youth setup.

Hércules was loaned to Crato in October 2020, helping in the club's promotion from the second level. Upon returning to Atlético Cearense, he became a regular starter, impressing during the 2021 Cearense.

=== Fortaleza ===
On 28 May 2021, Hércules signed for Fortaleza on loan until the end of the year, and was initially assigned to the under-23 side. In December, the club paid R$ 200,000 for 50% of his economic rights, and he agreed to a permanent contract until December 2024.

Hércules made his first team debut for Fortaleza on 24 February 2022, coming on as a late substitute for Juninho Capixaba in a 1–0 home win over Pacajus. He scored his first professional goal on 3 March, netting his side's fifth in a 5–0 away routing of the same opponent.

Hércules made his Série A debut on 10 April 2022, replacing Matheus Jussa in a 0–1 home loss against Cuiabá.

=== Fluminense ===
On 20 December 2024, Fluminense announced the signing of Hércules, for a rumoured fee of R$ 29 million for 70% of his economic rights. He scored his first goal for the club the following 18 May, netting the equalizer in a 1–1 away draw against Juventude.

During the 2025 FIFA Club World Cup, Hércules opened his scoring account with a goal in a 2–0 win over Inter Milan in the round of 16. He followed it up in the quarter-finals by scoring the decisive goal in a 2–1 victory against Al Hilal.

== Career statistics ==
As of 4 July 2025

Club	Season	League			State League		Cup		Continental		Other		Total	
Club	Season	Division	Apps	Goals	Apps	Goals	Apps	Goals	Apps	Goals	Apps	Goals	Apps	Goals
Tiradentes-CE	2019	Cearense 2ª Divisão	—		1	0	—		—		—		1	0
Atlético Cearense	2020	Cearense	—		2	0	—		—		—		2	0
Atlético Cearense	2021	Série D	0	0	15	0	—		—		4 (Note: Appearance(s) in Copa Fares Lopes)	0	19	0
Atlético Cearense	Career total		0	0	17	0	—		—		4	0	21	0
Crato (loan)	2020	Cearense 2ª Divisão	—		10	0	—		—		—		10	0
Fortaleza	2022	Série A	28	4	6	1	4	0	7 (Note: Appearance(s) in Copa Libertadores)	1	3 (Note: Appearance(s) in Copa do Nordeste)	1	48	7
Fortaleza	2023	Série A	13	1	8	1	3	0	9 (Note: Four appearances in Copa Libertadores, and five appearances and Copa Sudamericana)	0	8	3	41	5
Fortaleza	2024	Série A	32	4	2	0	2	1	7 (Note: Appearance(s) in Copa Sudamericana)	0	4	1	47	7
Fortaleza	Career total		73	9	16	2	9	1	23	1	15	5	136	19
Fluminense	2025	Série A	8	1	12	0	2	0	5	0	5 (Note: Appearance(s) in FIFA Club World Cup)	2	32	3
Career total			81	10	56	2	11	1	28	1	24	7	200	22

== Honours ==
Fortaleza

- Copa do Nordeste: 2022, 2024
- Campeonato Cearense: 2022, 2023
