= Kervin Andrade =

Venezuelan footballer (born 2005)

Personal information
- Full name: Kervin Mario Andrade Navarro
- Date of birth: 13 April 2005 (age 21)
- Place of birth: Puerto Ordaz, Ciudad Guayana, Venezuela
- Position: Forward

Team information
- Current team: Sport Recife

Senior career*
Years	Team	Apps	(Gls)
2021–2023	Deportivo La Guaira	57	(6)
2023–2025	Fortaleza	28	(2)
2025–	Maccabi Tel Aviv	27	(3)
2026–	→ Sport Recife (loan)	6	(0)

International career^{‡}
2023	Venezuela U23	3	(0)
2024–	Venezuela	5	(0)
- * Club domestic league appearances and goals as of 16 November 2026 ‡ National team caps and goals as of 10 October 2025

Kervin Mario Andrade Navarro (born 13 April 2005) is a Venezuelan footballer who plays as a forward for club Sport Recife.

== Club career ==
In September 2022, he was named by British newspaper The Guardian as one of the best players born in 2005 worldwide. In July 2023 he completed a transfer to Fortaleza EC, making his first appearance as a pro on 20 January 2024, scoring a goal.

== International career ==
Andrade made his debut for the senior Venezuela national team on 24 March 2024 in a friendly against Guatemala.

== Career statistics ==
=== Club ===
As of 6 November 2025.

Club	Season	League			State League		Cup		Continental		Other		Total	
Club	Season	Division	Apps	Goals	Apps	Goals	Apps	Goals	Apps	Goals	Apps	Goals	Apps	Goals
Deportivo La Guaira	2021	Liga FUTVE	13	1	—		0	0	0	0	—		13	1
Deportivo La Guaira	2022	Liga FUTVE	28	3	—		0	0	2 (Note: Appearance(s) in Copa Sudamericana)	0	—		30	3
Deportivo La Guaira	2023	Liga FUTVE	14	2	—		0	0	—		—		14	2
Deportivo La Guaira	Total		55	6	—		0	0	2	0	—		57	6
Fortaleza EC	2024	Série A	13	1	7	1	4	1	5	1	6 (Note: Appearance(s) in Copa do Nordeste)	3	32	7
Fortaleza EC	2025	Série A	7	0	1	0	2	0	2 (Note: Appearance(s) in Copa Libertadores)	0	3	1	15	1
Fortaleza EC	Total		20	1	8	1	6	1	7	1	9	4	47	8
Maccabi Tel Aviv	2025–26	Israeli Premier League	7	0	—		0	0	4 (Note: Appearance(s) in UEFA Europa League)	0	—		11	0
Career total			82	7	8	1	5	1	13	1	9	4	119	14

=== International ===
As of match played 10 October 2025

Appearances and goals by national team and year
National team	Year	Apps	Goals
Venezuela	2024	4	0
Venezuela	2025	1	0
Total		5	0

== Honours ==
Fortaleza

- Copa do Nordeste: 2024
