= João Neto (footballer, born July 2003) =

Brazilian footballer

Personal information
- Full name: João Batista da Cruz Santos Neto
- Date of birth: 10 July 2003 (age 23)
- Place of birth: Livramento de Nossa Senhora, Brazil
- Height: 1.81 m (5 ft 11 in)
- Position: Forward

Team information
- Current team: CRB (on loan from Fluminense)
- Number: 9

Youth career
- –2021: Fluminense

Senior career*
Years	Team	Apps	(Gls)
2021–	Fluminense	12	(3)
2024	→ CRB (loan)	18	(0)
2025	→ Portimonense (loan)	7	(1)
2026–	→ CRB (loan)	18	(1)
- * Club domestic league appearances and goals as of 16 November 2026

João Batista da Cruz Santos Neto (born 10 July 2003), commonly known as João Neto, is a Brazilian professional footballer who plays as a forward for CRB, on loan from Fluminense.

== Career statistics ==
=== Club ===
As of 10 November 2021.

Club	Season	League			State League		Cup		Continental		Other		Total	
Club	Season	Division	Apps	Goals	Apps	Goals	Apps	Goals	Apps	Goals	Apps	Goals	Apps	Goals
Fluminense	2021	Série A	2	0	1 (Note: Appearances in the Campeonato Carioca)	0	0	0	0	0	—		3	0
Career total			2	0	1	0	0	0	0	0	0	0	3	0
