= Imanol Machuca =

Argentine footballer (born 2000)

Personal information
- Full name: Imanol Javier Machuca
- Date of birth: 15 January 2000 (age 26)
- Place of birth: Roldán, Argentina
- Height: 1.70 m (5 ft 7 in)
- Position: Winger

Team information
- Current team: Club Atlético Independiente
- Number: 15

Youth career
- San Lorenzo (R)
- El Porvenir del Norte
- Sportivo Matienzo
- Talleres
- 2018–2020: Unión Santa Fe

Senior career*
Years	Team	Apps	(Gls)
2020–2023	Unión Santa Fe	77	(9)
2023–2026	Fortaleza	47	(5)
2025–2026	→ Vélez Sarsfield (loan)	19	(1)
2026–	Independiente	0	(0)

International career^{‡}
2025	Malaysia	1	(0)
- * Club domestic league appearances and goals as of 16:55, 12 August 2026 (UTC) ‡ National team caps and goals as of 10 June 2025

Imanol Javier Machuca (born 15 January 2000) is an Argentine professional footballer who plays as a winger for Argentine Primera División club Independiente. He represented Malaysia at international level; however, documents claiming his grandmother was born in Malaysia were found to have been forged.

== Career ==
=== Early career ===
Machuca started his career in Roldán with San Lorenzo. Spells soon followed with El Porvenir del Norte and Sportivo Matienzo, which preceded him joining the system of Talleres.

=== Unión Santa Fé ===
In 2018, after a trial with Vélez Sarsfield, Machuca completed a move to Unión Santa Fe. After two years in the reserves, he was promoted into the first-team squad in October 2020 under manager Juan Manuel Azconzábal; penning pro terms on 28 October. Machuca made his senior debut on 29 October during a Copa Sudamericana second stage first leg home defeat to Emelec, as he replaced Juan Manuel García with two minutes left.

=== Fortaleza ===
On 29 July 2023, Campeonato Brasileiro Série A side Fortaleza announced the signing of Machuca on a four-year deal, having acquired 50% of the player's economic rights for a reported fee of $2.5 million. Machuca arrived at Leão do Pici in 2023, when he played just 22 games, scoring two goals. In the 2024 season, the striker played 43 games, scoring four goals and providing five assists.

==== Loan to Vélez Sarsfield ====
On 13 January 2025, Machuca joined Argentine Primera División side Vélez Sarsfield on loan until the end of the year, with an option to buy. Vélez suspended Machuca following his sanction by FIFA in September of the same year. After the ban was temporarily lifted in January 2026, Machuca returned to Vélez Sarsfield.

== International career ==
Born in Argentina, Machuca claimed to be of Malaysian descent. He was called up to the Malaysia national team for a set of friendlies in June 2025. Machuca made his international debut on 10 June 2025 in the 2027 AFC Asian Cup qualification match against Vietnam at the Bukit Jalil National Stadium, coming on as a second-half substitute for fellow debutant Rodrigo Holgado.

He was among seven Malaysian national team players sanctioned by FIFA on 26 September 2025 when the disciplinary committee found that Football Association of Malaysia used doctored documentation to be able to field foreign-born players. As a result, Machuca was suspended from all football-related activities for one year. However, this ban was temporarily lifted by the Court of Arbitration for Sport on 26 January 2026 pending the final ruling.

== Personal life ==
Born in Argentina, Machuca claimed to be of Malaysian descent through his grandmother. However, FIFA released a statement that his grandmother was not born in nor has Malaysian ancestry, as the documentation submitted by Football Association of Malaysia was proven to be fabricated.

== Career statistics ==
=== Club ===
As of 3 September 2021.

Appearances and goals by club, season and competition
Club	Season	League			National cup (Note: Includes Copa Argentina, Copa do Brasil)		League cup		Continental		State league (Note: Includes Campeonato Cearense)		Total	
Club	Season	Division	Apps	Goals	Apps	Goals	Apps	Goals	Apps	Goals	Apps	Goals	Apps	Goals
Unión Santa Fe	2019–20	Primera División	—		—		0	0	—		—		0	0
Unión Santa Fe	2020–21 (Note: Soccerway counts Copa de la Liga Profesional appearances as league appearances.)	Primera División	1	0	—		—		1 (Note: Appearance(s) in Copa Sudamericana.)	0	—		2	0
Unión Santa Fe	2021	Primera División	21	2	—		—		—		—		21	2
Unión Santa Fe	2022	Primera División	33	3	2	0	—		8	0	—		43	3
Unión Santa Fe	2023	Primera División	22	4	1	1	—		—		—		23	5
Unión Santa Fe	Total		77	9	3	1	0	0	9	0	0	0	81	10
Fortaleza	2023	Série A	16	2	—		—		8	1	0	0	24	3
Fortaleza	2024	Série A	15	1	4	0	—		6	0	16	0	41	2
Fortaleza	Total		31	3	4	0	0	0	14	1	16	0	65	4
Vélez Sarsfield	2025	Primera División	8	0	2	0	—		1 (Note: Appearance(s) in Copa Libertadores.)	0	0	0	11	0
Career total			116	12	9	1	0	0	24	1	16	0	165	14

=== International ===
As of match played 10 June 2025

Appearances and goals by national team and year
National team	Year	Apps	Goals
Malaysia	2025	1	0
Total		1	0

== Honours ==
Fortaleza

- Copa do Nordeste: 2024
- Copa Sudamericana runner-up: 2023

Velez Sarsfield

- Supercopa Internacional: 2024
- Supercopa Argentina: 2024
