= Tomás Pochettino =

Argentine footballer (born 1996)

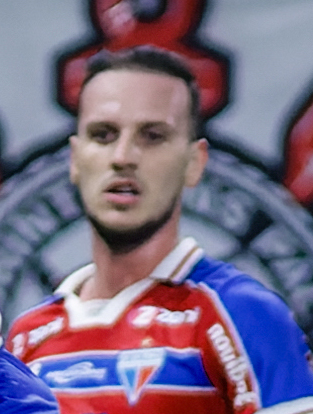
- Pochettino with Fortaleza in 2023

Personal information
- Full name: Tomás Pochettino
- Date of birth: 1 February 1996 (age 30)
- Place of birth: Rafaela, Argentina
- Height: 5 ft 11 in (1.80 m)
- Position: Midfielder

Team information
- Current team: Vitória (on loan from Fortaleza)
- Number: 8

Youth career
- –2015: Boca Juniors

Senior career*
Years	Team	Apps	(Gls)
2015–2019	Boca Juniors	1	(0)
2016–2018	→ Defensa y Justicia (loan)	44	(4)
2018–2019	→ Talleres (loan)	19	(0)
2020–2021	Talleres	27	(4)
2021–2022	Austin FC	31	(2)
2022	→ River Plate (loan)	20	(1)
2023–	Fortaleza	203	(20)
2026–	→ Vitória (loan)	0	(0)
Medal record
Boca Juniors
First place	Argentine Primera División	2015
- * Club domestic league appearances and goals as of 30 May 2026

Tomás Pochettino (Italian: [poketˈtiːno]; born 1 February 1996) is an Argentine professional footballer who plays as a midfielder for Vitória, on loan from Fortaleza.

== Club career ==
=== Boca Juniors ===
On 8 November 2015, Pochettino made his first team debut for Boca Juniors in a league game against Rosario Central, replacing Nicolás Colazo after 85 minutes.

=== Talleres ===
On 31 July 2018, Pochettino joined Talleres on a one-year loan with an option to make the move permanent. On 10 May 2019 Talleres confirmed, that they had acquired 50% of his rights and he would remain at the club.

=== Austin FC ===
On 11 February 2021, Pochettino signed for Austin FC of Major League Soccer ahead of their debut season. He made 31 appearances and 26 starts, scoring two goals and recording two assists. On January 10, 2022, the club announced it has loaned Pochettino to Argentina's River Plate for a one-year deal.

=== Fortaleza ===
On 6 January 2023, Pochettino transferred to Fortaleza for an undisclosed transfer fee.

== Career statistics ==
=== Club ===
As of match played 7 December 2023

Appearances and goals by club, season and competition
Club	Season	League			State League		Cup		Continental		Other		Total	
Club	Season	Division	Apps	Goals	Apps	Goals	Apps	Goals	Apps	Goals	Apps	Goals	Apps	Goals
Boca Juniors	2015	Argentine Primera División	1	0	–		–		–		–		1	0
Defensa y Justicia (loan)	2016	Argentine Primera División	9	0	–		2	0	–		–		11	0
Defensa y Justicia (loan)	2016–17	Argentine Primera División	19	3	–		1	0	1	0	–		21	3
Defensa y Justicia (loan)	2017–18	Argentine Primera División	16	1	–		1	0	2	0	–		19	1
Defensa y Justicia (loan)	Total		44	4	0	0	4	0	3	0	0	0	51	4
Talleres (loan)	2018–19	Argentine Primera División	19	0	–		7	1	4	1	–		30	3
Talleres	2019–20	Argentine Primera División	16	1	–		5	1	–		–		21	2
Talleres	2020–21	Copa de la Liga	11	3	–		–		–		–		11	3
Talleres	Total		27	4	0	0	5	1	0	0	0	0	32	5
Austin FC	2021	Major League Soccer	31	2	–		–		–		–		31	2
River Plate (loan)	2022	Argentine Primera División	20	1	–		1	0	3	0	–		24	1
Fortaleza	2023	Série A	35	2	7	1	4	0	17	3	6	0	69	6
Career total			177	13	7	1	21	2	27	4	6	0	238	20

== Honours ==
Boca Juniors

- Argentine Primera División: 2015

Fortaleza

- Campeonato Cearense: 2023, 2026
- Copa do Nordeste: 2024
