= Pedro Augusto =

Brazilian footballer

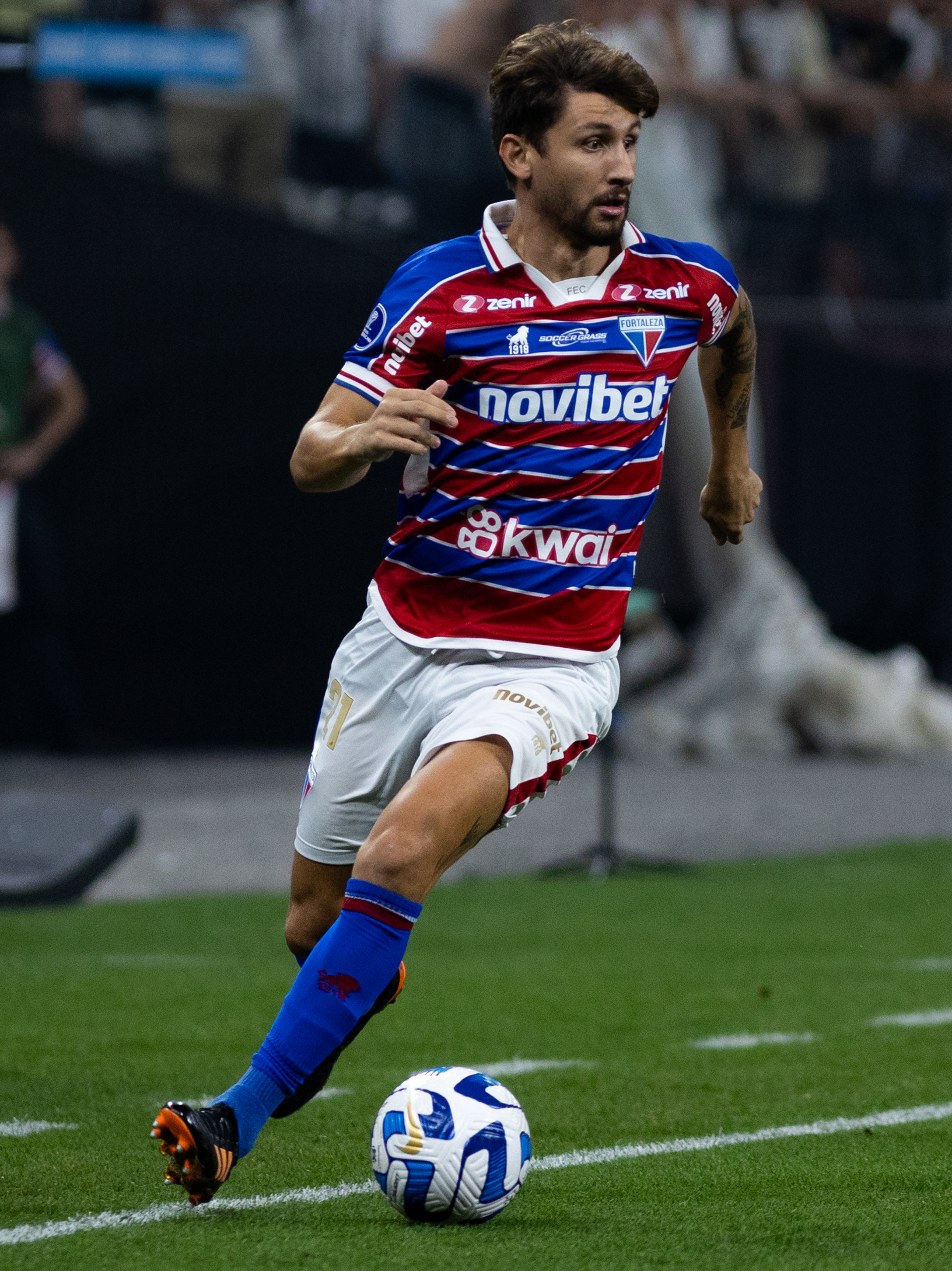
- Pedro Augusto playing for Fortaleza in 2023

Personal information
- Full name: Pedro Augusto Borges da Costa
- Date of birth: 3 March 1997 (age 29)
- Place of birth: Ubá, Brazil
- Height: 1.81 m (5 ft 11 in)
- Position: Midfielder

Team information
- Current team: Tochigi City
- Number: 20

Youth career
- 2012–2018: São Paulo

Senior career*
Years	Team	Apps	(Gls)
2018–2019	São Paulo	2	(0)
2018	→ São Bento (loan)	0	(0)
2019	→ Louletano (loan)	15	(0)
2019–2023	Tondela	93	(4)
2023–2025	Fortaleza	45	(0)
2025–2026	Sport	13	(0)
2026–	Tochigi City	12	(1)
- * Club domestic league appearances and goals as of 16 August 2026

Pedro Augusto Borges da Costa (born 3 March 1997), better known as just Pedro Augusto, is a Brazilian professional footballer who plays as a midfielder for J2 League club Tochigi City.

== Career ==
Pedro Augusto made his professional debut with São Paulo FC in a 2-0 Campeonato Paulista loss to on 17 January 2018. On 17 July 2019, Pedro August moved to C.D. Tondela in the Portuguese Primeira Liga.

== Career statistics ==
As of match played 26 May 2025

Appearances and goals by club, season and competition
Club	Season	League			State league		National cup (Note: Includes Copa do Brasil, Taça de Portugal)		League cup (Note: Includes Taça da Liga)		Continental		Other		Total	
Club	Season	Division	Apps	Goals	Apps	Goals	Apps	Goals	Apps	Goals	Apps	Goals	Apps	Goals	Apps	Goals
São Paulo	2016	Série A	0	0	0	0	0	0	—		0	0	10 (Note: Appearance(s) in Copa Paulista)	0	10	0
São Paulo	2018	Série A	0	0	2 (Note: Appearance(s) in Campeonato Paulista)	0	0	0	—		0	0	—		2	0
São Paulo	2019	Série A	0	0	0	0	0	0	—		0	0	—		0	0
São Paulo	Total		0	0	2	0	0	0	—		0	0	10	0	12	0
São Paulo B	2017	—			—		—		—		—		5	0	5	0
São Bento (loan)	2018	Série B	0	0	0	0	—		—		—		—		0	0
Louletano (loan)	2018-19	Campeonato de Portugal	15	1	—		0	0	—		—		—		15	1
Tondela	2019-20	Primeira Liga	7	0	—		0	0	1	0	—		—		8	0
Tondela	2020-21	Primeira Liga	27	1	—		2	0	0	0	—		—		29	1
Tondela	2021-22	Primeira Liga	29	2	—		5	0	1	0	—		—		35	2
Tondela	2022-23	Liga Portugal 2	30	1	—		2	0	4	0	—		1 (Note: Appearance(s) in Supertaça Cândido de Oliveira)	0	37	1
Tondela	Total		93	4	—		9	0	6	0	—		1	0	109	4
Fortaleza	2023	Série A	14	0	0	0	0	0	—		7 (Note: Appearance(s) in Copa Sudamericana)	0	0	0	21	0
Fortaleza	2024	Série A	27	0	1 (Note: Appearance(s) in Campeonato Cearense)	0	2	0	—		8	0	7 (Note: Appearance(s) in Copa do Nordeste)	0	45	0
Fortaleza	2025	Série A	1	0	2	0	0	0	—		0	0	1	0	4	0
Fortaleza	Total		42	0	3	0	2	0	—		15	0	8	0	70	0
Career total			150	5	5	0	11	0	6	0	15	0	24	0	211	5

== Honours ==
Fortaleza

- Copa do Nordeste: 2024
- Campeonato Cearense: 2024
