= Magrão (footballer, born 2000) =

Portuguese footballer

Personal information
- Full name: Audenirton Soares da Silva
- Date of birth: May 15, 2000 (age 26)
- Place of birth: Pindoretama, Brazil
- Height: 1.97 m (6 ft 6 in)
- Position: Goalkeeper

Team information
- Current team: Fortaleza
- Number: 15

Youth career
- 2015–2017: Fortaleza
- 2017–2020: Palmeiras

Senior career*
Years	Team	Apps	(Gls)
2020–2021	Rio Ave II	46	(0)
2021–2023	Rio Ave	9	(0)
2024–	Fortaleza	3	(0)
- * Club domestic league appearances and goals as of 15 December 2025

Audenirton Soares da Silva (born 15 May 2000), better known as Magrão, is a Brazilian professional footballer who plays as a goalkeeper for Fortaleza.

== Professional career ==
Magrão is youth product of the Brazilian clubs Fortaleza and Palmeiras, winning the 2018 Campeonato Brasileiro Sub-20 and 2 state competitions with the latter. He transferred to the Portuguese club Rio Ave on 5 October 2020 on a 4-year contract, where has originally assigned to their reserves. He made his senior and professional debut with Rio Ave in a 3–2 Taça de Portugal loss to Oliveira do Hospital on 16 October 2022.

== Personal life ==
Magrão was coached by his father who was a professional footballer, and his inspiration growing up was the Brazilian goalkeeper Ederson.
