= Zé Welison =

Brazilian footballer

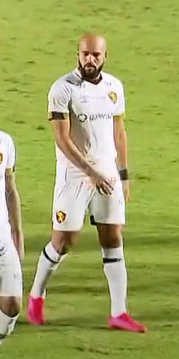
- Zé Welison with Sport Recife in 2021

Personal information
- Full name: José Welison da Silva
- Date of birth: 11 March 1995 (age 31)
- Place of birth: São Pedro, Brazil
- Height: 1.77 m (5 ft 10 in)
- Position: Defensive midfielder

Team information
- Current team: Remo
- Number: 28

Youth career
- Cruzeiro de Macaíba
- 2009–2010: ABC
- 2011–2015: Vitória

Senior career*
Years	Team	Apps	(Gls)
2014–2019	Vitória	81	(4)
2018	→ Atlético Mineiro (loan)	15	(0)
2019–2022	Atlético Mineiro	34	(0)
2020–2021	→ Botafogo (loan)	23	(0)
2021	→ Sport Recife (loan)	33	(2)
2022	→ Fortaleza (loan)	31	(2)
2023–2025	Fortaleza	72	(1)
2026–	Remo	8	(0)

International career
2014	Brazil U20		
2014	Brazil U21	3	(0)
- * Club domestic league appearances and goals as of 9 April 2026

José Welison da Silva (born 11 March 1995), known as Zé Welison, is a Brazilian professional footballer who plays as a defensive midfielder for Remo.

== Club career ==
=== Vitória ===
Born in São Pedro, Rio Grande do Norte, Zé Welison joined Vitória's youth setup in 2011, from ABC. At the former, he won the Copa do Brasil Sub-20 in 2012, and was promoted to the first team in the 2014 season.

Zé Welison made his senior debut on 23 January 2014, starting and scoring his team's third in a 3–1 Copa do Nordeste away win against Confiança. On 26 February, he renewed his contract until the end of 2018.

Zé Welison was named in the Best XI of the 2014 Campeonato Baiano, and was elected the Best Newcomer of the tournament. He made his Série A debut on 19 April, playing the full 90 minutes in a 1–0 away loss against Internacional.

Zé Welison scored his first goal in the top tier on 27 April 2014, netting his team's second in a 2–2 home draw against Atlético Paranaense. He was a regular starter during his first season, as his side suffered relegation, but subsequently suffered injuries which kept him out for several months of competition.

=== Atlético Mineiro ===
On 28 June 2018, Zé Welison joined Atlético Mineiro on loan for the remainder of the season. The following 7 January, he transferred to the club on a permanent basis, signing a five-year contract.

Regularly used during the 2018 and 2019 campaigns, Zé Welison was deemed surplus to requirements at Galo after the arrival of Jorge Sampaoli.

== International career ==
Zé Welison was a part of the Brazil under-20 side that won the 2014 Panda Cup in China. In that year, he also featured for the under-21s in some friendlies.

== Career statistics ==
As of 1 January 2022

Club	Season	League			State League		Cup		Continental		Other		Total	
Club	Season	Division	Apps	Goals	Apps	Goals	Apps	Goals	Apps	Goals	Apps	Goals	Apps	Goals
Vitória	2014	Série A	21	1	2	0	2	0	2 (Note: Appearance(s) in Copa Sudamericana)	0	4 (Note: Appearance(s) in Copa do Nordeste)	1	31	2
Vitória	2015	Série B	1	0	3	0	—		—		3	0	7	0
Vitória	2016	Série A	13	0	9	0	3	0	1	0	—		26	0
Vitória	2017	Série A	7	1	6	0	3	0	—		5	1	21	2
Vitória	2018	Série A	6	0	6	0	6	0	—		3	0	21	0
Vitória	Total		48	2	26	2	14	0	3	0	15	2	106	4
Atlético Mineiro	2018	Série A	15	0	—		—		—		—		15	0
Atlético Mineiro	2019	Série A	18	0	9	0	3	0	12 (Note: Seven appearances in Copa Libertadores, five appearances in Copa Sudamericana)	0	—		42	0
Atlético Mineiro	2020	Série A	0	0	7	0	1	0	1	0	—		9	0
Atlético Mineiro	Total		33	0	16	0	4	0	13	0	—		66	0
Botafogo	2020	Série A	17	0	—		—		—		—		17	0
Botafogo	2021	Série A	—		5	0	1	0	—		—		6	0
Botafogo	Total		17	0	5	0	1	0	—		—		23	0
Sport Recife	2021	Série A	31	2	2	0	—		—		0	0	33	2
Career total			129	4	49	2	19	0	16	0	15	2	228	6

== Honours ==
Vitória

- Campeonato Baiano: 2016, 2017
- Copa do Brasil Sub-20: 2012

Atlético Mineiro

- Campeonato Mineiro: 2020

Fortaleza

- Copa do Nordeste: 2022, 2024
- Campeonato Cearense: 2022, 2023

=== International ===
Brazil U20

- Panda Cup: 2014

=== Individual ===
- Campeonato Baiano Team of The Tournament: 2014
- Campeonato Baiano Best Newcomer: 2014
