= 2024 Copa do Nordeste =

Tournament details
- Country: Brazil
- Dates: 3 February – 9 June
- Teams: 16

Final positions
- Champions: Fortaleza (3rd title)
- Runners-up: CRB
- 2025 Copa do Brasil: Fortaleza

Tournament statistics
- Matches played: 72
- Goals scored: 169 (2.35 per match)
- Top goal scorer: Moisés (7 goals)

The 2024 Copa do Nordeste (officially the Copa do Nordeste Betnacional 2024 for sponsorship reasons) was the 21st edition of the main football tournament featuring teams from the Brazilian Northeast Region. The competition featured 16 clubs, with Bahia, Ceará and Pernambuco having two seeds each, and Alagoas, Maranhão, Paraíba, Piauí, Rio Grande do Norte and Sergipe with one seed each. Four teams were decided by a qualifying tournament (Eliminatória da Copa do Nordeste 2024). The Copa do Nordeste began on 3 February and ended on 9 June 2024. Ceará were the defending champions but were eliminated in the quarter-finals.

== Format ==
In this season, 12 teams (9 state league champions and best placed teams in the 2023 CBF ranking from Ceará, Bahia and Pernambuco) gained direct entries into the group stage while the other four berths were decided by the Eliminatória da Copa do Nordeste.

For the group stage, the 16 teams were drawn into two groups. Each team played once against the eight clubs from the other group. Top four teams qualified for the final stages. Quarter-finals and semi-finals were played on a single-leg basis and finals were played on a home-and-away two-legged basis.

== Qualification ==
The 2024 Copa do Nordeste qualification (officially the Eliminatória da Copa do Nordeste 2024) was the qualifying tournament of the 2024 Copa do Nordeste. It was played from 6 to 14 January 2024. Sixteen teams competed to decide four places in the Copa do Nordeste. The teams entered in two rounds where the four winners advanced to the Copa do Nordeste.

The winners were ABC (Rio Grande do Norte), Altos (Piauí), Botafogo-PB (Paraíba) and Juazeirense (Bahia).

== Teams ==
The qualified teams are

Association	Team	Qualification method
(Alagoas) Alagoas; 1 berth	CRB	2023 Campeonato Alagoano champions
(Bahia) Bahia; 2 + 1 berths	Bahia	2023 Campeonato Baiano champions
(Bahia) Bahia; 2 + 1 berths	Vitória	best placed team in the 2023 CBF ranking not already qualified
(Bahia) Bahia; 2 + 1 berths	Juazeirense	2024 Copa do Nordeste qualification
(Ceará) Ceará; 2 berths	Fortaleza	2023 Campeonato Cearense champions
(Ceará) Ceará; 2 berths	Ceará	best placed team in the 2023 CBF ranking not already qualified
(Maranhão) Maranhão; 1 berth	Maranhão	2023 Campeonato Maranhense champions
(Paraíba) Paraíba; 1 + 1 berths	Treze	2023 Campeonato Paraibano champions
(Paraíba) Paraíba; 1 + 1 berths	Botafogo-PB	2024 Copa do Nordeste qualification
(Pernambuco) Pernambuco; 2 berths	Sport	2023 Campeonato Pernambucano champions
(Pernambuco) Pernambuco; 2 berths	Náutico	best placed team in the 2023 CBF ranking not already qualified
(Piauí) Piauí; 1 + 1 berths	River	2023 Campeonato Piauiense champions
(Piauí) Piauí; 1 + 1 berths	Altos	2024 Copa do Nordeste qualification
(Rio Grande do Norte) Rio Grande do Norte; 1 + 1 berths	América de Natal	2023 Campeonato Potiguar champions
(Rio Grande do Norte) Rio Grande do Norte; 1 + 1 berths	ABC	2024 Copa do Nordeste qualification
(Sergipe) Sergipe; 1 berth	Itabaiana	2023 Campeonato Sergipano champions

== Schedule ==
The schedule of the competition is as follows.

Stage	First leg	Second leg
Group Stage	Round 1: 4 February	
Group Stage	Round 2: 10 February	
Group Stage	Round 3: 14 February	
Group Stage	Round 4: 21 and 28 February	
Group Stage	Round 5: 6 and 13 March	
Group Stage	Round 6: 20 March	
Group Stage	Round 7: 24 March	
Group Stage	Round 8: 27 March	
Quarter-finals	10 April	
Semi-finals	24 April	
Finals	5 June	9 June

== Draw ==
The draw for the group stage was held on 18 January 2024, 19:30, at the Teatro Silvio Mendes in Teresina. The teams were seeded into four pots based on the 2023 CBF ranking (shown in parentheses). They were drawn into two groups of eight containing two teams from each of the four pots with the restriction that teams from the same federation (except Juazeirense) could not be drawn into the same group.

Group stage draw
Pot 1	Pot 2	Pot 3	Pot 4
(Ceará) Fortaleza (7); Ceará (14); Bahia (15); (Pernambuco) Sport (26)	(Alagoas) CRB (27); (Bahia) Vitória (29); (Pernambuco) Náutico (37); (Rio Grande do Norte) ABC (44)	(Paraíba) Botafogo-PB (56); (Bahia) Juazeirense (57); (Piauí) Altos (58); (Rio Grande do Norte) América de Natal (62)	(Paraíba) Treze (79); (Sergipe) Itabaiana (106); (Piauí) River (140); Maranhão (205)

== Group stage ==
For the group stage, the 16 teams were drawn into two groups of eight teams each. Each team played on a single round-robin tournament against the eight clubs from the other group. The top four teams of each group advanced to the quarter-finals of the knockout stages. The teams were ranked according to points (3 points for a win, 1 point for a draw, and 0 points for a loss). If tied on points, the following criteria would be used to determine the ranking: 1. Wins; 2. Goal difference; 3. Goals scored; 4. Fewest red cards; 5. Fewest yellow cards; 6. Draw in the headquarters of the Brazilian Football Confederation (Regulations Article 13).

=== Group A ===
Pos	Team	Pld	W	D	L	GF	GA	GD	Pts	Qualification
1	(Pernambuco) Sport	8	5	2	1	16	8	+8	17	Advance to Quarter-finals
2	(Alagoas) CRB	8	4	3	1	12	6	+6	15	Advance to Quarter-finals
3	(Paraíba) Botafogo-PB	8	4	3	1	9	3	+6	15	Advance to Quarter-finals
4	Ceará	8	4	3	1	9	6	+3	15	Advance to Quarter-finals
5	(Bahia) Vitória	8	4	2	2	12	7	+5	14	
6	Maranhão	8	4	2	2	14	13	+1	14	
7	(Rio Grande do Norte) América de Natal	8	3	2	3	9	11	−2	11	
8	(Piauí) River	8	3	1	4	5	9	−4	10	

Source: CBF

=== Group B ===
Pos	Team	Pld	W	D	L	GF	GA	GD	Pts	Qualification
1	Bahia	8	6	0	2	11	8	+3	18	Advance to Quarter-finals
2	(Ceará) Fortaleza	8	2	2	4	9	10	−1	8	Advance to Quarter-finals
3	(Piauí) Altos	8	1	5	2	6	8	−2	8	Advance to Quarter-finals
4	(Pernambuco) Náutico	8	1	4	3	7	8	−1	7	Advance to Quarter-finals
5	(Rio Grande do Norte) ABC	8	1	4	3	8	12	−4	7	
6	(Bahia) Juazeirense	8	2	0	6	9	13	−4	6	
7	(Paraíba) Treze	8	1	3	4	5	11	−6	6	
8	(Sergipe) Itabaiana	8	1	0	7	8	16	−8	3	

Source: CBF

=== Results ===
Home \ Away	ABC	ALT	BAH	FOR	ITA	JUA	NAU	TRE
(Rio Grande do Norte) América de Natal	1–0				1–2		1–0	2–2
(Paraíba) Botafogo-PB		1–2	4–0	1–1		1–0		
Ceará	2–2	1–1	1–2		2–1			
(Alagoas) CRB		2–0	0–1	1–0		3–1		
Maranhão				3–2		2–1	1–3	1–0
(Piauí) River	0–1	0–0	1–0		1–0			
(Pernambuco) Sport				1–1		3–0	2–2	3–1
(Bahia) Vitória	3–1				3–1		1–1	3–0

Home \ Away	AME	BOT	CEA	CRB	MAR	RIV	SPO	VIT
(Rio Grande do Norte) ABC		0–0		2–2	2–2		0–2	
(Piauí) Altos	1–1				1–1		1–2	0–0
Bahia	3–0				1–0		2–1	2–1
(Ceará) Fortaleza	2–1		0–1			3–1		0–1
(Sergipe) Itabaiana		0–1		0–2	3–4		1–2	
(Bahia) Juazeirense	1–2		0–1			4–1		2–0
(Pernambuco) Náutico		0–1	0–0	1–1		0–1		
(Paraíba) Treze		0–0	0–1	1–1		1–0		

Source:CBF
Legend: Blue = home team win; Yellow = draw; Red = away team win.

== Final stages ==
Starting from the quarter-finals, the teams played a single-elimination tournament with the following rules:

- Quarter-finals and semi-finals were played on a single-leg basis, with the higher-seeded team hosting the leg.
  - If tied, the penalty shoot-out would be used to determine the winners (Regulations Article 19).
- Finals were played on a home-and-away two-legged basis, with the higher-seeded team hosting the second leg.
  - If tied on aggregate, the penalty shoot-out would be used to determine the winners (Regulations Article 19).
- Extra time would not be played and away goals rule would not be used in final stages.

Starting from the semi-finals, the teams were seeded according to their performance in the tournament. The teams were ranked according to overall points. If tied on overall points, the following criteria would be used to determine the ranking: 1. Overall wins; 2. Overall goal difference; 3. Overall goals scored; 4. Fewest red cards in the tournament; 5. Fewest yellow cards in the tournament; 6. Draw in the headquarters of the Brazilian Football Confederation (Regulations Article 20).

=== Bracket ===
Quarter-finals
(Pernambuco)	Sport	2
(Ceará)	Ceará	1
(Ceará)	Fortaleza	5
(Piauí)	Altos	0
(Bahia)	Bahia	3
(Pernambuco)	Náutico	0
(Alagoas)	CRB (p)	0 (4)
(Paraíba)	Botafogo-PB	0 (3)

Semi-finals
(Pernambuco)	Sport	1
(Ceará)	Fortaleza	4
(Bahia)	Bahia	0 (7)
(Alagoas)	CRB (p)	0 (8)

Finals
(Ceará)	Fortaleza (p)	2	0	2 (5)
(Alagoas)	CRB	0	2	2 (4)

=== Quarter-finals ===
Team 1	Score	Team 2
Sport (Pernambuco)	2–1	Ceará
Fortaleza (Ceará)	5–0	(Piauí) Altos
Bahia	3–0	(Pernambuco) Náutico
CRB (Alagoas)	0–0 (4–3 p)	(Paraíba) Botafogo-PB

==== Group C ====
10 April 2024
21:30

Sport (Pernambuco)	2–1	Ceará
Felipinho 42'; Rafael Thyere 90+1'	Report	Recalde 63'

Arena Pernambuco, São Lourenço da Mata
Referee: Afro Rocha de Carvalho Filho (Paraíba)

==== Group D ====
21 April 2024
19:00

Fortaleza (Ceará)	5–0	(Piauí) Altos
Marinho 28' (pen.); Andrade 36', 45+1'; Moisés 42'; Yago Pikachu 68'	Report

Castelão, Fortaleza
Referee: Márcio dos Santos Oliveira (Alagoas)

==== Group E ====
10 April 2024
21:30

Bahia	3–0	(Pernambuco) Náutico
Thaciano 65'; Estupiñán 79'; Jean Lucas 85'	Report

Arena Fonte Nova, Salvador
Referee: Paulo José Souza Mourão (Maranhão)

==== Group F ====
9 April 2024
20:00

CRB (Alagoas)	0–0	(Paraíba) Botafogo-PB
	Report
Penalties
Anselmo Ramon (penalty scored); Gegê (penalty scored); Falcão (penalty scored); Matheus Ribeiro (penalty scored)	4–3	(penalty scored) Wendel Lomar; (penalty missed) Pipico; (penalty scored) Lenon; (penalty scored) Paulinho; (penalty missed) Júlio Rusch

Estádio Rei Pelé, Maceió
Referee: Leonilson Fernandes Trigueiro Filho (Rio Grande do Norte)

=== Semi-finals ===
Pos	Team	Pld	W	D	L	GF	GA	GD	Pts	Host
2	(Pernambuco) Sport	9	6	2	1	18	9	+9	20	Host
4	(Ceará) Fortaleza	9	3	2	4	14	10	+4	11	
1	Bahia	9	7	0	2	14	8	+6	21	Host
3	(Alagoas) CRB	9	4	4	1	12	6	+6	16	

Source: CBF

Team 1	Score	Team 2
Sport (Pernambuco)	1–4	(Ceará) Fortaleza
Bahia	0–0 (7–8 p)	(Alagoas) CRB

==== Group G ====
26 May 2024
18:00

Sport (Pernambuco)	1–4	(Ceará) Fortaleza
Gustavo Coutinho 82'	Report	Moisés 8', 18', 42'; Hércules 21'

Arena Pernambuco, São Lourenço da Mata
Referee: Caio Max Augusto Vieira (Rio Grande do Norte)

==== Group H ====
26 May 2024
18:00

Bahia	0–0	(Alagoas) CRB
	Report
Penalties
Everaldo (penalty scored); Estupiñán (penalty scored); Luciano Juba (penalty scored); Cauly (penalty scored); Jean Lucas (penalty scored); Biel (penalty scored); Ademir (penalty scored); Caio Alexandre (penalty missed)	7–8	(penalty scored) Anselmo Ramon; (penalty scored) Gegê; (penalty scored) Rômulo; (penalty scored) Hereda; (penalty scored) Mike; (penalty scored) João Pedro; (penalty scored) Matheus Ribeiro; (penalty scored) Lucas Kallyel

Arena Fonte Nova, Salvador
Referee: Fábio Augusto Santos Sá Júnior (Sergipe)

=== Finals ===
Pos	Team	Pld	W	D	L	GF	GA	GD	Pts	Host
1	(Alagoas) CRB	10	4	5	1	12	6	+6	17	2nd leg
2	(Ceará) Fortaleza	10	4	2	4	18	11	+7	14	1st leg

Source: CBF

Team 1	Agg.	Team 2	1st leg	2nd leg
Fortaleza (Ceará)	2–2 (5–4 p)	(Alagoas) CRB	2–0	0–2

==== Group I ====
5 June 2024
21:30

Fortaleza (Ceará)	2–0	(Alagoas) CRB
Moisés 40'; Lucero 45+3'	Report

Castelão, Fortaleza
Referee: Paulo Belence Alves dos Prazeres Filho (Pernambuco)

9 June 2024
16:30

CRB (Alagoas)	2–0	(Ceará) Fortaleza
João Neto 65', 86'	Report
Penalties
Anselmo Ramon (penalty missed); Gegê (penalty scored); João Neto (penalty scored); Hereda (penalty scored); Matheus Ribeiro (penalty scored)	4–5	(penalty scored) Lucero; (penalty scored) Pedro Rocha; (penalty scored) Zé Welison; (penalty scored) Hércules; (penalty scored) Yago Pikachu

Estádio Rei Pelé, Maceió
Referee: Emerson Ricardo de Almeida Andrade (Bahia)

2024 Copa do Nordeste
Champions

Fortaleza
3rd title

== Top goalscorers ==
As of 5 June 2024

Rank	Player	Team	Goals
1	(Brazil) Moisés	(Ceará) Fortaleza	7
2	(Brazil) Anselmo Ramon	(Alagoas) CRB	5
2	(Brazil) Gustavo Coutinho	(Pernambuco) Sport	5
4	(Brazil) Erick Pulga	Ceará	4
4	(Brazil) Thaciano	Bahia	4
4	(Brazil) Vinícius Barata	Maranhão	4

Source:CBF
