= 2026 Fortaleza Esporte Clube season =

Fortaleza
2026 season
- Manager: Thiago Carpini (until 23 July); Paulo Autuori (30 July–8 November); Juan Pablo Vojvoda (from 10 November)
- Stadium: Arena Castelão
- Campeonato Brasileiro Série B: 4th
- Campeonato Cearense: Champions
- Copa do Brasil: Round of 16
- Copa do Nordeste: Runners-up
- Biggest defeat: Botafogo-SP 4–0 Fortaleza

During the 2026 season, the 108th in its history, Fortaleza Esporte Clube is currently competing in the Campeonato Brasileiro Série B, to which it was relegated for the first time since 2018. The club is also taking part in the Copa do Brasil, where it has advanced to the fifth round, and in the regional Copa do Nordeste. In the Campeonato Cearense, Fortaleza won the state championship title, claiming its 47th title in the competition and adding it to its trophy cabinet. On 11 December 2025, the club appointed Thiago Carpini as head coach until the end of the 2026 season, succeeding Martín Palermo after the expiration of his contract. That contract would have been automatically extended if the team had avoided relegation.

== Transfers ==
=== In ===
Pos.	Player	Transferred from	Fee	Date	Source
DF	(Brazil) Paulinho	(Brazil) Vasco da Gama	Undisclosed	6 February 2026	
MF	(Brazil) Luiz Fernando	(Brazil) Athletico Paranaense	Undisclosed	12 February 2026	
DF	(Colombia) Gabriel Fuentes	(Brazil) Fluminense	Loan	13 February 2026	
FW	(Brazil) Gabriel	(Brazil) Vasco da Gama	Loan	13 February 2026	
FW	(Argentina) Juan Miritello	(Argentina) Defensa y Justicia	Loan	4 March 2026	

=== Out ===
Pos.	Player	Transferred to	Fee	Date	Source
DF	(Argentina) Gastón Ávila	(Netherlands) AFC Ajax	Loan return	31 December 2025	
MF	(Brazil) Yago Pikachu	(Brazil) Remo		1 January 2026	
MF	(Brazil) Breno Lopes	(Brazil) Coritiba	R$15 million	15 January 2026	
FW	(Argentina) Juan Martín Lucero	Universidad de Chile		20 January 2026	
DF	(Argentina) Eros Mancuso	(Argentina) Estudiantes de La Plata	Loan	22 January 2026	
FW	(Brazil) Deyverson	(Ecuador) LDU Quito		23 January 2026	
MF	(Brazil) Kauan	(Brazil) Athletic Club (MG)	Loan	28 January 2026	
FW	(Argentina) José María Herrera	(Brazil) Red Bull Bragantino		30 January 2026	
FW	(Brazil) Moisés	(Brazil) Santos		11 February 2026	
FW	(Paraguay) Adam Bareiro	(Argentina) Boca Juniors		21 February 2026	
DF	(Brazil) Diogo Barbosa	(Brazil) Juventude		27 March 2026	

== Competitions ==
=== Overall record ===
Competition	First match	Last match	Starting round	Final position	Record							
Competition	First match	Last match	Starting round	Final position	Pld	W	D	L	GF	GA	GD	Win %
Campeonato Brasileiro Série B	21 March 2026		Matchday 1		36	16	14	6	43	31	+12	44.44
Campeonato Cearense		8 March 2026		Winners	11	6	5	0	14	3	+11	54.55
Copa do Brasil	24 February 2026				7	5	1	1	11	9	+2	71.43
Copa do Nordeste	24 March 2026			Runner-up	10	5	1	4	13	11	+2	50.00
Total					64	32	21	11	81	54	+27	50.00

Last updated: 30 May 2026
Source: Competitions

=== Campeonato Brasileiro Série B ===
Pos	Team	Pld	W	D	L	GF	GA	GD	Pts	Promotion or relegation
2	Juventude (P)	38	20	11	7	51	26	+25	71	Promotion to 2027 Campeonato Brasileiro Série A
3	Vila Nova	38	19	9	10	53	39	+14	66	Advance to the promotion play-offs
4	Fortaleza	38	17	14	7	45	33	+12	65	Advance to the promotion play-offs
5	Criciúma	38	18	8	12	38	32	+6	62	Advance to the promotion play-offs
6	Atlético Goianiense	38	16	13	9	46	35	+11	61	Advance to the promotion play-offs

Source: CBF
Rules for classification: 1) points; 2) wins; 3) goal difference; 4) goals scored; 5) head-to-head results (only between 2 teams); 6) fewest red cards; 7) fewest yellow cards; 8) drawing of lots.
(P) Promoted

==== Results by round ====
Round	1	2	3	4	5	6	7	8	9	10	11
Ground	A	H	H	A	H	A	H	A	A	H	A
Result	L	D	W	W	W	D	W	D	L	W	
Position											

Updated to match(es) played on 23 May 2026. Source:
A = Away; H = Home; W = Win; D = Draw; L = Loss

==== Matches ====
21 March 2026 1	Botafogo-SP	4–0	Fortaleza
19:15

31 March 2026 2	Fortaleza	0–0	Cuiabá	Fortaleza
19:00				Stadium: Arena Castelão

4 April 2026 3	Fortaleza	2–1	Juventude	Fortaleza
16:00				Stadium: Arena Castelão

12 April 2026 4	São Bernardo	0–1	Fortaleza
18:00

19 April 2026 5	Fortaleza	3–2	Criciúma	Fortaleza
20:00 UTC−3				Stadium: Arena Castelão

26 April 2026 6	Operário Ferroviário	0–0	Fortaleza	Ponta Grossa
18:00 UTC−3				Stadium: Estádio Germano Krüger; Referee: Jefferson Ferreira de Moraes

2 May 2026 7	Fortaleza	4–1	Goiás	Fortaleza
20:30				Stadium: Arena Castelão

10 May 2026 8	Avaí	0–0	Fortaleza	Florianópolis
18:30			Brítez (yellow card) 67' (yellow-red card) 90+6'	Stadium: Estádio da Ressacada; Referee: Paulo Cesar Zanovelli da Silva

17 May 2026 9	Ceará	2–1	Fortaleza	Fortaleza
18:30				Stadium: Castelão; Referee: Rodrigo José Pereira

23 May 2026 10	Fortaleza	3–0	Londrina	Fortaleza
18:30				Stadium: Castelão

30 May 2026 11	Athletic	1–0	Fortaleza	São João del-Rei
18:00				Stadium: Estádio Joaquim Portugal

9 June 2026 12	Náutico	0–1	Fortaleza	Recife
19:00

16 June 2026 13	Fortaleza	0–3	América Mineiro	Fortaleza
20:00				Stadium: Castelão

21 June 2026 14	CRB	1–1	Fortaleza	Maceió
16:00

28 June 2026 15	Fortaleza	2–1	Sport	Fortaleza
18:30				Stadium: Castelão

2 July 2026 16	Fortaleza	2–0	Ponte Preta	Fortaleza
21:00				Stadium: Castelão

12 July 2026 17	Atlético Goianiense	1–0	Fortaleza	Goiânia
18:00

17 July 2026 18	Fortaleza	1–0	Novorizontino	Fortaleza
21:00				Stadium: Castelão

21 July 2026 19	Vila Nova	2–1	Fortaleza	Goiânia
21:35

28 July 2026 20	Fortaleza	1–0	Botafogo-SP	Fortaleza
21:35				Stadium: Castelão

9 August 2026 21	Cuiabá	1–1	Fortaleza	Cuiabá
18:00

15 August 2026 22	Juventude	0–0	Fortaleza	Caxias do Sul
18:30

19 August 2026 23	Fortaleza	1–1	São Bernardo	Fortaleza
19:30				Stadium: Castelão

23 August 2026 24	Criciúma	0–2	Fortaleza	Criciúma
18:30

31 August 2026 25	Fortaleza	1–1	Operário Ferroviário	Fortaleza
19:30				Stadium: Castelão

5 September 2026 26	Goiás	0–1	Fortaleza	Goiânia
16:00

9 September 2026 27	Fortaleza	1–0	Avaí	Fortaleza
19:30				Stadium: Castelão

13 September 2026 28	Fortaleza	1–1	Ceará	Fortaleza
18:30				Stadium: Castelão

20 September 2026 29	Londrina	1–2	Fortaleza
18:30

27 September 2026 30	Fortaleza	2–2	Athletic	Fortaleza
18:30				Stadium: Castelão

2 October 2026 31	Fortaleza	1–1	Náutico	Fortaleza
21:35				Stadium: Castelão

7 October 2026 32	América Mineiro	0–1	Fortaleza	Belo Horizonte
20:30

12 October 2026 33	Fortaleza	2–2	CRB	Fortaleza
16:00				Stadium: Castelão

17 October 2026 34	Sport	0–2	Fortaleza	Recife
20:30

24 October 2026 35	Ponte Preta	2–2	Fortaleza
18:30

2 November 2026 36	Fortaleza	0–0	Atlético Goianiense	Fortaleza
16:00				Stadium: Castelão

7 November 2026 37	Novorizontino	2–1	Fortaleza
16:10

14 November 2026 38	Fortaleza	1–0	Vila Nova	Fortaleza
16:30				Stadium: Castelão

==== Promotion play-offs ====
21 November 2026 First leg	Criciúma	v	Fortaleza	Criciúma

28 November 2026 Second leg	Fortaleza	v	Criciúma	Fortaleza

=== Copa do Brasil ===
==== Second round ====
24 February 2026	Fortaleza	4–3	Maguary
21:30

==== Third round ====
11 March 2026	Manauara	0–1	Fortaleza	Manaus
				Stadium: Arena da Amazônia; Referee: Gustavo Ervino Baurrmann

==== Fourth round ====
17 March 2026	Nova Iguaçu	0–1	Fortaleza
19:00

==== Fifth round ====
22 April 2026 First leg	Fortaleza	2–1	CRB	Fortaleza
20:30	Maílton 44'; Miritello 56'		Mikael 32'	Stadium: Arena Castelão; Referee: Edina Alves Batista

14 May 2026 Second leg	CRB	0–0 (1–2 agg.)	Fortaleza	Maceió
20:00			Miritello (penalty missed) 81	Stadium: Estádio Rei Pelé; Referee: Anderson Daronco

==== Round of 16 ====
2 August 2026 First leg	Palmeiras	v	Fortaleza	São Paulo

8 August 2026 Second leg	Fortaleza	v	Palmeiras	Fortaleza

=== Copa do Nordeste ===
24 March 2026 1	Ferroviário (Ceará)	0–1	(Ceará) Fortaleza	Fortaleza
21:30

28 March 2026 2	Fortaleza (Ceará)	2–1	(Maranhão) Imperatriz	Fortaleza
19:00

8 April 2026 3	Ceará	2–0	(Ceará) Fortaleza	Fortaleza
21:30

16 April 2026 4	América de Natal (Rio Grande do Norte)	1–1	(Ceará) Fortaleza	Natal
19:00

29 April 2026 5	Fortaleza (Ceará)	2–0	(Pernambuco) Sport	Fortaleza
21:30 UTC−3				Stadium: Arena Castelão; Referee: Afro Rocha De Carvalho Filho

==== Knockout stage ====
7 May 2026 Quarter-finals	Confiança (Sergipe)	1–2	(Ceará) Fortaleza	Aracaju
19:30				Stadium: Batistão; Referee: Paulo Jose Souza Mourao

20 May 2026 Semi-finals First leg	Fortaleza (Ceará)	1–2	(Pernambuco) Sport	Fortaleza
21:00

27 May 2026 Semi-finals Second leg	Sport (Pernambuco)	0–2 (2–3 agg.)	(Ceará) Fortaleza	Recife
21:30
