= 2026 Campeonato Cearense =

Campeonato Cearense
- Season: 2026
- Dates: 6 January – 8 March
- Champions: Fortaleza
- Relegated: Quixadá; Tirol
- Copa do Brasil: Ceará; Ferroviário; Fortaleza
- Série D: Ferroviário; Horizonte; Iguatu
- Copa do Nordeste: Ceará; Fortaleza
- Matches: 43
- Goals: 94 (2.19 per match)

The 2026 Campeonato Cearense (officially the Campeonato Cearense 2026 for sponsorship reasons) was the 112th edition of Ceará's top professional football league organized by FCF. The competition began on 6 January and ended on 8 March 2026. Ceará were the defending champions.

== Format ==
In the first stage, the 10 teams were drawn into two groups of five teams each.

Group A	Group B
Fortaleza; Ferroviário; Maracanã; Horizonte; Quixadá	Ceará; Floresta; Iguatu; Tirol; Maranguape

Each team played each of the other four teams once in a round-robin tournament. The top three teams from Groups A and B advanced to the second stage, forming Groups C and D, respectively. Meanwhile, the bottom two teams from Groups A and B played in the relegation stage. This stage was played in a single round-robin format. The bottom two teams were relegated to the 2027 Campeonato Cearense Série B.

In the second stage, each team participated in a single round-robin tournament against the three clubs from the other group. The winners and runners-up of each group advanced to the semi-finals, while the third-place teams competed for fifth place.

During the first, second and relegation stages, the teams will be ranked according to points (3 points for a win, 1 point for a draw, and 0 points for a loss). If tied on points, the following criteria will be used to determine the ranking: 1. Wins; 2. Goal difference; 3. Goals scored; 4. Fewest red cards; 5. Fewest yellow cards; 6. Draw in the headquarters of the FCF.

The fifth-place and the third-place matches will be played in a single-leg format. The team with the best overall performance will host the match. If tied, the penalty shoot-out will be used to determine the winners.

The semi-finals and the finals will be played on a home-and-away two-legged basis. If tied on aggregate, the penalty shoot-out will be used to determine the winners. For the finals, the team with best overall performance will host the second leg.

The champions, runners-up, and third-place team will qualify for the 2027 Copa do Brasil. The top three teams that are not already qualified for the 2027 Série A, B, or C will qualify for the 2027 Série D.

== Teams ==
Club	Home city	Manager
Ceará	Fortaleza	Mozart
Ferroviário	Fortaleza	Nuno Pereira
Floresta	Fortaleza	Leston Júnior
Fortaleza	Fortaleza	Thiago Carpini
Horizonte	Horizonte	Adriano Albino
Iguatu	Iguatu	Washington Luiz
Maracanã	Maracanaú	Júnior Cearense
Maranguape	Maranguape	João Neto
Quixadá	Quixadá	Jazon Vieira
Tirol	Fortaleza	Ailton Silva

== First stage ==
=== Group A ===
Pos	Team	Pld	W	D	L	GF	GA	GD	Pts	Qualification
1	Fortaleza	4	3	1	0	6	0	+6	10	Advance to the second stage
2	Ferroviário	4	2	2	0	5	3	+2	8	Advance to the second stage
3	Horizonte	4	1	2	1	4	4	0	5	Advance to the second stage
4	Quixadá	4	1	1	2	2	6	−4	4	Advance to relegation stage
5	Maracanã	4	0	0	4	1	5	−4	0	Advance to relegation stage

Source: FCF
Rules for classification: 1) Points; 2) Wins; 3) Goal difference; 4) Goals scored; 5) Fewest red cards; 6) Fewest yellow cards; 7) Draw.

=== Group B ===
Pos	Team	Pld	W	D	L	GF	GA	GD	Pts	Qualification
1	Ceará	4	3	1	0	7	2	+5	10	Advance to the second stage
2	Floresta	4	2	1	1	6	2	+4	7	Advance to the second stage
3	Iguatu	4	1	3	0	4	2	+2	6	Advance to the second stage
4	Maranguape	4	1	0	3	1	6	−5	3	Advance to relegation stage
5	Tirol	4	0	1	3	1	7	−6	1	Advance to relegation stage

Source: FCF
Rules for classification: 1) Points; 2) Wins; 3) Goal difference; 4) Goals scored; 5) Fewest red cards; 6) Fewest yellow cards; 7) Draw.

== Second stage ==
=== Group C ===
Pos	Team	Pld	W	D	L	GF	GA	GD	Pts	Qualification
1	Fortaleza	3	1	2	0	2	1	+1	5	Advance to the semi-finals
2	Ferroviário	3	1	1	1	3	5	−2	4	Advance to the semi-finals
3	Horizonte	3	0	1	2	1	6	−5	1	Advance to fifth place match

Source: FCF
Rules for classification: 1) Points; 2) Wins; 3) Goal difference; 4) Goals scored; 5) Fewest red cards; 6) Fewest yellow cards; 7) Draw.

=== Group D ===
Pos	Team	Pld	W	D	L	GF	GA	GD	Pts	Qualification
1	Ceará	3	2	1	0	9	1	+8	7	Advance to the semi-finals
2	Floresta	3	1	1	1	1	1	0	4	Advance to the semi-finals
3	Iguatu	3	0	2	1	2	4	−2	2	Advance to fifth place match

Source: FCF
Rules for classification: 1) Points; 2) Wins; 3) Goal difference; 4) Goals scored; 5) Fewest red cards; 6) Fewest yellow cards; 7) Draw.

== Relegation stage ==
=== Standings and Results ===
Pos	Team	Pld	W	D	L	GF	GA	GD	Pts	Relegation	MAR	MCN	QUI	TIR
1	Maranguape	3	2	1	0	7	4	+3	7			1–1		3–2
2	Maracanã	3	1	1	1	5	4	+1	4				2–3	
3	Quixadá	3	1	0	2	4	6	−2	3	Relegation to 2027 Série B	1–3			0–1
4	Tirol	3	1	0	2	3	5	−2	3	Relegation to 2027 Série B		0–2		

Source: FCF
Legend: Blue = home team win; Yellow = draw; Red = away team win.

== Semi-finals ==
Team 1	Agg.	Team 2	1st leg	2nd leg
Ferroviário	0–4	Fortaleza	0–2	0–2
Floresta	0–7	Ceará	0–3	0–4

=== Group E ===
14 February 2026
16:30

Ferroviário	0–2	Fortaleza
		Bareiro 12'; Vitinho 57'

Estádio Presidente Vargas, Fortaleza
Referee: Raimundo Rodrigues de Oliveira Júnior

21 February 2026
17:00

Fortaleza	2–0	Ferroviário
Lucas Sasha 7'; Pochettino 56'

Estádio Presidente Vargas, Fortaleza
Referee: Luciano da Silva Miranda Filho

=== Group F ===
15 February 2026
16:00

Floresta	0–3	Ceará
		Rafael Ramos 16'; Vina 39', 77'

Estádio Presidente Vargas, Fortaleza
Referee: Elizabete Esmeralda Cordeiro dos Santos Gomes

22 February 2026
18:00

Ceará	4–0	Floresta
Matheusinho 5'; Wendel Silva 42', 78'; Luiz Otávio 60'

Estádio Presidente Vargas, Fortaleza
Referee: Léo Simão Holanda

== Fifth place match ==
11 February 2026
19:00

Iguatu	3–1	Horizonte
Cássio 5'; Alison Araçoiaba 57'; Piauí 66'		Willian Anicete 15' (pen.)

Estádio Antônio Moreno de Mello, Iguatu
Referee: Raimundo Rodrigues de Oliveira Júnior

== Third place match ==
26 February 2026
19:00

Ferroviário	1–0	Floresta
Kiuan 87'

Estádio Presidente Vargas, Fortaleza
Referee: Antônio Magno Lima Cordeiro

== Finals ==
Team 1	Agg.	Team 2	1st leg	2nd leg
Fortaleza	2–2 (5–4 p)	Ceará	1–1	1–1

=== Group G ===
1 March 2026
18:00

Fortaleza	1–1	Ceará
Lucas Emanoel 85'		Lucca 90+1'

Castelão, Fortaleza
Referee: Rafael Rodrigo Klein (Rio Grande do Sul)

Fortaleza	Ceará

GK	12	(Brazil) Brenno
DF	22	(Brazil) Maílton
DF	2	(Argentina) Emanuel Brítez (c)
DF	3	(Brazil) Lucas Gazal
DF	4	(Brazil) Luan Freitas	(yellow card) 24'
DF	18	(Colombia) Gabriel Fuentes
MF	29	(Brazil) Rodrigo		(substituted off) 63'
MF	5	(Brazil) Pierre		(substituted off) 79'
MF	88	(Brazil) Lucas Sasha	(yellow card) 54'
FW	7	(Argentina) Tomás Pochettino		(substituted off) 63'
FW	32	(Brazil) Luiz Fernando		(substituted off) 79'
Substitutes:
GK	25	(Brazil) Vinícius Silvestre
DF	33	(Brazil) Kauã Rocha
DF	36	(Brazil) Guilherme Moura
MF	8	(Brazil) Ronald		(substituted on) 63'
MF	10	(Brazil) Lucas Crispim		(substituted on) 79'
MF	19	(Brazil) Lucas Emanoel		(substituted on) 79'
MF	35	(Brazil) Bruninho
MF	37	(Brazil) Ryan
MF	38	(Brazil) Lucca Prior		(substituted on) 63'
FW	11	(Brazil) Vitinho
FW	21	(Brazil) GB
FW	75	(Brazil) Rodriguinho
Coach:
(Brazil) Thiago Carpini			(yellow card) 58'

GK	1	(Brazil) Richard (c)
DF	21	(Brazil) Alex Silva
DF	33	(Brazil) Éder
DF	18	(Brazil) Júlio César		(substituted off) 70'
DF	4	(Brazil) Luiz Otávio
DF	17	(Brazil) Fernando	(yellow card) 90+2'	(substituted off) 65'
MF	31	(Brazil) Lucas Lima
MF	25	(Brazil) Vinicius Zanocelo	(yellow card) 67'
FW	7	(Brazil) Pedro Henrique		(substituted off) 70'
FW	9	(Brazil) Wendel Silva		(substituted off) 79'
FW	98	(Brazil) Matheusinho		(substituted off) 65'
Substitutes:
GK	23	(Brazil) Jorge
GK	41	(Brazil) Gustavo Martins
DF	2	(Portugal) Rafael Ramos	(yellow card) 78'	(substituted on) 65'
DF	3	(Brazil) Ronald Carvalho
DF	13	(Brazil) Luiz Otávio Leandro
DF	63	(Brazil) Gilmar	(yellow card) 74'	(substituted on) 70'
MF	26	(Brazil) Richardson
MF	40	(Brazil) Melk		(substituted on) 65'
MF	81	(Brazil) João Gabriel
FW	11	(Brazil) Fernandinho		(substituted on) 70'
FW	35	(Brazil) Giulio
FW	99	(Brazil) Lucca		(substituted on) 79'
Coach:
(Brazil) Mozart

Assistant referees:
José Moracy de Sousa e Silva
Deborah Beatriz Ferreira da Silva
Fourth official:
Luciano da Silva Miranda Filho
Fifth official:
Wladyerisson Silva Oliveira
Video assistant referee:
Rodrigo Nunes de Sá (Rio de Janeiro)
Assistant video assistant referees:
Renan Aguiar da Costa
Rejane Caetano da Silva

8 March 2026
18:00

Ceará	1–1	Fortaleza
Luiz Otávio 29'		Luiz Fernando 55'
Penalties
Vinicius Zanocelo (penalty scored); Fernando (penalty scored); Juan Alano (penalty missed); Luiz Otávio (penalty scored); Rafael Ramos (penalty scored)	4–5	(penalty scored) Lucas Gazal; (penalty scored) Lucas Crispim; (penalty scored) Lucas Sasha; (penalty scored) Maílton; (penalty scored) Pochettino

Castelão, Fortaleza
Referee: Rodrigo José Pereira de Lima (Pernambuco)

Ceará	Fortaleza

GK	1	(Brazil) Richard (c)	(yellow card) 66'
DF	21	(Brazil) Alex Silva		(substituted off) 71'
DF	4	(Brazil) Luiz Otávio
DF	33	(Brazil) Éder
DF	17	(Brazil) Fernando	(yellow card) 41'
MF	31	(Brazil) Lucas Lima
MF	25	(Brazil) Vinicius Zanocelo	(yellow card) 62'
MF	40	(Brazil) Melk		(substituted off) 58'
FW	8	(Brazil) Matheus Araújo		(substituted off) 58'
FW	9	(Brazil) Wendel Silva		(substituted off) 71'
FW	98	(Brazil) Matheusinho		(substituted off) 63'
Substitutes:
GK	94	(Brazil) Bruno Ferreira
DF	2	(Portugal) Rafael Ramos		(substituted on) 71'
DF	3	(Brazil) Ronald Carvalho
DF	13	(Brazil) Luiz Otávio Leandro
DF	63	(Brazil) Gilmar
MF	10	(Brazil) Juan Alano		(substituted on) 58'
MF	26	(Brazil) Richardson
MF	29	(Brazil) Vina	(yellow card) 65'	(substituted on) 58'
MF	81	(Brazil) João Gabriel
FW	11	(Brazil) Fernandinho		(substituted on) 63'
FW	99	(Brazil) Lucca		(substituted on) 71'
Coach:
(Brazil) Mozart

GK	12	(Brazil) Brenno
DF	22	(Brazil) Maílton
DF	2	(Argentina) Emanuel Brítez (c)	(yellow card) 24'
DF	3	(Brazil) Lucas Gazal
DF	4	(Brazil) Luan Freitas		(substituted off) 46'
DF	18	(Colombia) Gabriel Fuentes
MF	29	(Brazil) Rodrigo	(yellow card) 22'	(substituted off) 46'
MF	5	(Brazil) Pierre	(yellow card) 57'	(substituted off) 59'
MF	88	(Brazil) Lucas Sasha
FW	7	(Argentina) Tomás Pochettino
FW	32	(Brazil) Luiz Fernando	(yellow card) 65'	(substituted off) 82'
Substitutes:
GK	25	(Brazil) Vinícius Silvestre
DF	33	(Brazil) Kauã Rocha
DF	36	(Brazil) Guilherme Moura
DF	43	(Brazil) João Lucas
MF	8	(Brazil) Ronald		(substituted on) 59'
MF	10	(Brazil) Lucas Crispim		(substituted on) 82'
MF	19	(Brazil) Lucas Emanoel
MF	37	(Brazil) Ryan
MF	38	(Brazil) Lucca Prior		(substituted on) 46'
FW	11	(Brazil) Vitinho		(substituted on) 46'
FW	21	(Brazil) GB
FW	75	(Brazil) Rodriguinho
Coach:
(Brazil) Thiago Carpini			(yellow card) 70'

Assistant referees:
Nailton Júnior de Sousa Oliveira
Renan Aguiar da Costa
Fourth official:
Léo Simão Holanda
Fifth official:
Elizabete Esmeralda Cordeiro dos Santos Gomes
Video assistant referee:
Wagner Reway (Santa Catarina)
Assistant video assistant referees:
Eleutério Felipe Marques Júnior
Antônio Magno Lima Cordeiro

== Overall table ==
Pos	Team	Pld	W	D	L	GF	GA	GD	Pts	Qualification or relegation
1	Fortaleza	11	6	5	0	14	3	+11	23	Champions and 2027 Copa do Brasil
2	Ceará	11	7	4	0	25	5	+20	25	Runners-up and 2027 Copa do Brasil
3	Ferroviário	10	4	3	3	9	12	−3	15	2027 Copa do Brasil and 2027 Série D
4	Floresta	10	3	2	5	7	11	−4	11	
5	Iguatu	8	2	5	1	9	7	+2	11	2027 Série D
6	Horizonte	8	1	3	4	6	13	−7	6	2027 Série D
7	Maranguape	7	3	1	3	8	10	−2	10	
8	Maracanã	7	1	1	5	6	9	−3	4	
9	Quixadá	7	2	1	4	6	12	−6	7	Relegation to the 2027 Campeonato Cearense Série B
10	Tirol	7	1	1	5	4	12	−8	4	Relegation to the 2027 Campeonato Cearense Série B

Source: FCF
