= 2026 Ceará Sporting Club season =

Ceará
2026 season
- President: João Paulo Silva
- Manager: Mozart
- Stadium: Arena Castelão
- Campeonato Brasileiro Série B: 9th
- Campeonato Cearense: Runners-up
- Copa do Brasil: Fifth round
- Copa do Nordeste: Quarter-finals

Ceará Sporting Club is competing in the 2026 season, the 113th in the club's history. Following relegation after a single season in the top division, the team plays in Campeonato Brasileiro Série B. It has advanced to the fifth round of the Copa do Brasil and is participating in the first phase of the Copa do Nordeste. In the Campeonato Cearense, Ceará lost to Fortaleza and did not retain the state title.

On 12 December 2025, the club announced that Mozart would serve as coach for one year.

== Transfers ==
=== In ===
Pos.	Player	Transferred to	Fee	Date	Source
MF	(Brazil) Juan Alano	(Japan) Gamba Osaka		1 January 2026	
DF	(Brazil) Fernando	(Brazil) Athletico Paranaense		1 January 2026	
MF	(Brazil) Vinicius Zanocelo	(Brazil) Santos		1 January 2026	
MF	(Brazil) Matheusinho	(Portugal) Santa Clara		25 January 2026	
FW	(Brazil) Wendel Silva	(Portugal) Santa Clara		13 February 2026	
MF	(Brazil) Gustavo Prado	(Brazil) Internacional		26 March 2026	

=== Out ===
Pos.	Player	Transferred to	Fee	Date	Source
FW	(Brazil) Pedro Raul	(Brazil) Corinthians	Loan return	31 December 2025	
MF	(Argentina) Lucas Mugni	(Brazil) Mirassol		5 January 2026	

== Competitions ==
=== Campeonato Brasileiro Série B ===
Pos	Team	Pld	W	D	L	GF	GA	GD	Pts
11	Atlético Goianiense	8	3	2	3	8	8	0	11
12	Athletic	9	2	5	2	10	10	0	11
13	Ceará	8	2	4	2	8	8	0	10
14	Avaí	9	2	4	3	10	11	−1	10
15	Cuiabá	9	1	7	1	4	4	0	10

Updated to match(es) played on 17 May 2026. Source: CBF
Rules for classification: 1) points; 2) wins; 3) goal difference; 4) goals scored; 5) head-to-head results (only between 2 teams); 6) fewest red cards; 7) fewest yellow cards; 8) drawing of lots.

==== Matches ====
21 March 2026 1	Ceará	1–1	São Bernardo	Fortaleza
18:00				Stadium: Castelão

1 April 2026 2	Ponte Preta	1–1	Ceará	São Paulo
21:00

4 April 2026 3	Cuiabá	0–2	Ceará	Cuiabá
18:00

11 April 2026 4	Ceará	1–0	Náutico	Fortaleza
20:30				Stadium: Castelão

19 April 2026 5	Londrina	0–0	Ceará	Londrina
16:00

26 April 2026 6	Ceará	3–3	Vila Nova	Fortaleza
18:00	Lucas Lima 15'; Matheus Araújo 44', 45+3'		Rafael Silva 13', 67'; João Vieira 63' (pen.)	Stadium: Castelão; Referee: Yuri Elino Ferreira da Cruz

3 May 2026 7	Sport	2–0	Ceará	Recife
18:00	Chrystian Barletta 53' (pen.); Madson 71'			Stadium: Estádio Ilha do Retiro; Referee: Bráulio da Silva Machado

9 May 2026 8	Ceará	0–1	Atlético Goianiense	Fortaleza
19:00			Gustavo Coutinho 29' (pen.); Bruno José (red card) 41'	Stadium: Castelão; Referee: Fernando Antônio Mendes

17 May 2026 9	Ceará	2–1	Fortaleza	Fortaleza
18:30				Stadium: Castelão; Referee: Rodrigo José Pereira

=== Campeonato Cearense ===
==== Semi-finals ====
15 February 2026 First leg	Floresta	0–3	Ceará
16:00

22 February 2026 Second leg	Ceará	4–0 (7–0 agg.)	Floresta
18:00

==== Finals ====
1 March 2026 First leg	Fortaleza	1–1	Ceará	Fortaleza
18:00				Stadium: Castelão

8 March 2026 Second leg	Ceará	1–1 (2–2 agg.) (4–5 p)	Fortaleza	Fortaleza
18:00				Stadium: Castelão

=== Copa do Brasil ===
==== Third round ====
12 March 2026	Maranhão	0–1	Ceará

==== Fourth round ====
17 March 2026	São Bernardo	0–0 (2–3 p)	Ceará
19:30

==== Fifth round ====
23 April 2026 First leg	Atlético Mineiro	2–1	Ceará	Belo Horizonte
19:00	Cassierra 44'; Lodi 73'		Wendel 65'	Stadium: Arena MRV; Referee: Wanderson Alves de Sousa

13 May 2026	Ceará	2–1 (2–4 p)	Atlético Mineiro	Fortaleza
				Stadium: Castelão

=== Copa do Nordeste ===
==== Group stage ====
25 March 2026 1	Ceará	1–1	ABC
19:00

28 March 2026 2	Retrô	3–1	Ceará
17:00

8 April 2026 3	Ceará	2–0	Fortaleza
21:30

14 April 2026 4	Ceará	4–1	Jacuipense
21:30

29 April 2026 5	Maranhão	1–3	Ceará	São Luís
21:30				Stadium: Estádio Castelão; Referee: Antônio Dib Moraes de Sousa

==== Knockout stage ====
6 May 2026 Quarter-finals	Vitória	1–0	Ceará	Salvador
21:30			Luiz Otávio (red card) 35'	Stadium: Barradão
