= Lucas Lima =

Lucas Lima may refer to:

- Lucas Lima (footballer, born 1990), born Lucas Rafael Araújo Lima, Brazilian football attacking midfielder for Santos
- Lucas Lima (footballer, born 1991), born Lucas Pedro Alves de Lima, Brazilian football left-back
- Lucas Lima (footballer, born 2000), born Lucas Eduardo Lima da Silva, Brazilian football midfielder
- Lucas Lima (footballer, born 2002)

== See also ==
- Lucas Paquetá (Lucas Tolentino Coelho de Lima, born 1997), Brazilian football attacking midfielder for Lyon
