= Allan Fayan =

Brazilian footballer (born 1990)

Personal information
- Full name: Allan Fayan Alves Rodrigues de Moura
- Date of birth: 20 March 1990 (age 36)
- Place of birth: Jacobina, Brazil
- Height: 1.78 m (5 ft 10 in)
- Position: Midfielder

Team information
- Current team: LAAC

Senior career*
Years	Team	Apps	(Gls)
2006	Itaúna		
2007–2008	Icasa		
2008	Barbalha		
2010	Inter de Bebedouro		
2011–2013	Anadia	13	(1)
2013–2014	Sporting Espinho	39	(3)
2014–2015	Freamunde	5	(0)
2015	AD Oliveirense	12	(0)
2016–2017	Gouveia	18	(1)
2017	AC Famalicão	5	(1)
2017–2018	Vista Alegre	21	(2)
2018–2020	Pampilhosa	34	(3)
2020	Oliveira do Bairro	9	(2)
2020–2021	Gafanha	7	(1)
2021–	LAAC	1	(0)
- * Club domestic league appearances and goals ‡ National team caps and goals as of 26 August 2021

Allan Fayan Alves Rodrigues de Moura (born 20 March 1990) is a Brazilian football midfielder who plays for LAAC. He played on the Portuguese second tier for Freamunde.
