= 2014 Copa dos Campeões Cearenses =

1st Copa dos Campeões Cearenses, formal annual football match

Ceará	Barbalha
(Ceará)	(Ceará)
2	0
- Date: 11 January 2014
- Venue: Arena Castelão, Fortaleza
- Referee: Gleysto Concalves (FCF)
- Attendance: 12,000+

The 2014 Copa dos Campeões Cearenses was the first edition of Copa dos Campeões Cearenses, an annual football match played formally between the champions of the Campeonato Cearense and the Copa Fares Lopes.

The edition was played between Ceará, champion of the 2013 Campeonato Cearense, and Barbalha, champion of the 2013 Copa Fares Lopes, in a single game.

Ceará ended up winning the match by the score of 2-0 and becoming champion of the tournament. However, as the number of substitutions exceeded the limit established for official matches, the tournament was considered to be merely friendly in nature, so that the 2014 edition does not appear, in the official FCF records, as a valid edition of the tournament.

== Qualified teams ==
Team	Qualification	Previous appearances (bold indicates winners)
Ceará Sporting Club	2013 Campeonato Cearense champions	—
(Ceará) Barbalha Futebol Clube	2013 Copa Fares Lopes champions	—

== Match ==
=== Details ===
11 January 2014
18:00

Ceará	2–0	(Ceará) Barbalha
Magno Alves 31'; Anderson 34'	Report

Arena Castelão, Belo Horizonte
Attendance: 12,000+
Referee: Gleysto Goncalves (Ceará)
