= Melk (footballer) =

Brazilian footballer

Personal information
- Full name: Melquisedeque Costa de Oliveira
- Date of birth: 28 July 2006 (age 20)
- Place of birth: Fortaleza, Brazil
- Height: 1.69 m (5 ft 7 in)
- Position: Winger

Team information
- Current team: Ceará
- Number: 40

Youth career
- 2021–2026: Ceará

Senior career*
Years	Team	Apps	(Gls)
2026–	Ceará	41	(8)
- * Club domestic league appearances and goals as of 18 November 2026

Melquisedeque Costa de Oliveira (born 28 July 2006), commonly known as Melk, is a Brazilian footballer who plays for Ceará. Mainly as a right winger, he can also play as an attacking midfielder.

== Career ==
Born in Fortaleza, Melk joined Ceará's youth sides in 2021, aged 15, initially for the futsal sides. He made his senior debut on 10 January 2026, starting in a 1–0 Campeonato Cearense away win over Floresta, and was later a spotlight of the under-20 team in the 2026 Copa São Paulo de Futebol Júnior.

Definitely promoted to the main squad shortly after, Melk renewed his contract until December 2028 on 24 March 2026, and scored his first goal on 14 April, netting Vozão's third in a 4–1 home routing of Jacuipense, for the year's Copa do Nordeste. On 17 May, he scored the equalizer in the 2–1 Clássico-Rei win over rivals Fortaleza, also providing the assist for Júlio César's winner and being named man of the match.

== Career statistics ==
As of 23 September 2026

Club	Season	League			State league		Cup		Continental		Other		Total	
Club	Season	Division	Apps	Goals	Apps	Goals	Apps	Goals	Apps	Goals	Apps	Goals	Apps	Goals
Ceará	2025	Série B	—		—		—		—		5 (Note: Appearance(s) in Copa Fares Lopes)	3	5	3
Ceará	2026	Série B	26	8	7	0	4	0	—		3 (Note: Appearance(s) in Copa do Nordeste)	1	40	9
Career total			26	8	7	0	4	0	0	0	8	4	45	12
