= Rodriguinho (footballer, born 2003) =

Brazilian footballer

Personal information
- Full name: Rodrigo Henrique Santos de Souza
- Date of birth: 5 June 2003 (age 23)
- Place of birth: Contagem, Brazil
- Height: 1.70 m (5 ft 7 in)
- Position: Midfielder

Team information
- Current team: Fortaleza (on loan from Cruzeiro)
- Number: 75

Youth career
- América Mineiro

Senior career*
Years	Team	Apps	(Gls)
2022–2024	América Mineiro	57	(6)
2025–	Cruzeiro	5	(0)
2025	→ Ceará (loan)	4	(0)
2026–	→ Fortaleza (loan)	4	(0)
- * Club domestic league appearances and goals as of 15 April 2026

Rodrigo Henrique Santos de Souza (born 5 June 2003), commonly known as Rodriguinho, is a Brazilian professional footballer who plays as a midfielder for Fortaleza, on loan from Cruzeiro.

== Career ==
Born in Contagem, Minas Gerais, Rodriguinho was an América Mineiro youth graduate. He was promoted to the first team in December 2021, and made his senior debut on 25 January 2022, starting in a 1–2 Campeonato Mineiro away loss against Caldense.

== Career statistics ==
As of 10 October 2024

Club	Season	League			State League		Cup		Continental		Other		Total	
Club	Season	Division	Apps	Goals	Apps	Goals	Apps	Goals	Apps	Goals	Apps	Goals	Apps	Goals
América Mineiro	2022	Série A	4	0	8	0	1	1	2 (Note: Appearance(s) in Copa Libertadores)	0	—		15	1
América Mineiro	2023	Série A	20	2	0	0	0	0	6 (Note: Appearance(s) in Copa Sudamericana)	0	—		26	2
América Mineiro	2024	Série B	10	4	9	0	0	0	—		—		19	4
Career total			34	6	17	0	1	1	8	0	0	0	60	7
