= Luan Freitas =

Brazilian footballer (born 2003)

Personal information
- Full name: Luan de Freitas Molarinho Chagas
- Date of birth: 20 January 2001 (age 25)
- Place of birth: Rio de Janeiro, Brazil
- Height: 1.84 m (6 ft 0 in)
- Position: Centre back

Team information
- Current team: Fortaleza (on loan from Fluminense)
- Number: 4

Youth career
- Fluminense

Senior career*
Years	Team	Apps	(Gls)
2021–	Fluminense	1	(0)
2023	→ Londrina	7	(0)
2024–2025	→ Paysandu (loan)	31	(1)
2025	→ Juventude (loan)	14	(0)
2026–	→ Fortaleza (loan)	8	(0)
- * Club domestic league appearances and goals as of 15 April 2026

Luan de Freitas Molarinho Chagas (born 20 January 2001), known as Luan Freitas, is a Brazilian footballer who plays as a central defender for Fortaleza.

== Club career ==
Born in Rio de Janeiro, Luan Freitas was a youth graduate of Fluminense, and started to feature in first team trainings in 2019. He made his first team debut on 4 March 2021, starting in a 2–1 Campeonato Carioca away loss against Resende; he broke the fifth metatarsal bone of his left foot during the match, being sidelined for three months.

On 8 October 2021, Luan Freitas renewed his contract with Flu until the end of 2024. He spent the entire 2022 season nursing a knee injury, only recovering in March 2023.

== Personal life ==
Luan Freitas is twin brother of the also professional footballer Lucas Freitas.

== Career statistics ==
As of 27 June 2023.

Appearances and goals by club, season and competition
Club	Season	League			State League		Cup		Continental		Other		Total	
Club	Season	Division	Apps	Goals	Apps	Goals	Apps	Goals	Apps	Goals	Apps	Goals	Apps	Goals
Fluminense	2021	Série A	0	0	1 (Note: Appearances in the Campeonato Carioca)	0	0	0	0	0	—		1	0
Fluminense	2022	Série A	0	0	0	0	0	0	—		—		0	0
Fluminense	2023	Série A	0	0	0	0	0	0	0	0	—		0	0
Career total			0	0	1	0	0	0	0	0	0	0	1	0

== Honours ==
Paysandu

- Campeonato Paraense: 2024
- Copa Verde: 2024, 2025
- Supercopa Grão-Pará: 2025

Fortaleza

- Campeonato Cearense: 2026
