= Lucas Gazal =

Brazilian footballer

Personal information
- Full name: Lucas Xavier Gazal
- Date of birth: 6 August 1999 (age 27)
- Place of birth: Diadema, Brazil
- Height: 1.87 m (6 ft 2 in)
- Position: Centre back

Team information
- Current team: Fortaleza
- Number: 3

Youth career
- 2011–2013: Diadema
- Red Bull Brasil

Senior career*
Years	Team	Apps	(Gls)
2021–2022	Aparecidense	33	(1)
2022–2025	Atlético Goianiense	48	(2)
2024	→ Mirassol (loan)	34	(1)
2025	→ Shandong Taishan (loan)	17	(1)
2025	→ Fortaleza (loan)	7	(0)
2026–	Fortaleza	42	(0)
- * Club domestic league appearances and goals as of 15 August 2026

Lucas Xavier Gazal (born 6 August 1999) is a Brazilian footballer who plays as a central defender for Fortaleza.

== Club career ==
=== Aparecidense ===
Born in Diadema, São Paulo, Gazal joined Aparecidense on 21 January 2021, from Red Bull Brasil, for the remainder of the 2020 season. He made his senior debut on 17 February, coming on as a half-time substitute but being sent off after just 11 minutes in a 2–1 Campeonato Goiano away loss against Atlético Goianiense.

Gazal became a regular starter for the Camaleão during the 2021 Série D, appearing in ten matches during the competition as the club achieved a first-ever promotion as champions. He scored his first senior goal on 26 June 2022, netting the opener in a 3–0 Série C away win over Volta Redonda.

=== Atlético Goianiense ===
On 22 July 2022, Gazal signed a two-year contract with Série A side Atlético Goianiense. He made his debut in the category on 6 August, his 23rd birthday, by starting in a 2–1 home success over Red Bull Bragantino.

== Career statistics ==
As of 24 November 2024

Appearances and goals by club, season and competition
Club	Season	League			State League		Cup		Continental		Other		Total	
Club	Season	Division	Apps	Goals	Apps	Goals	Apps	Goals	Apps	Goals	Apps	Goals	Apps	Goals
Aparecidense	2020	Série D	0	0	1	0	—		—		—		1	0
Aparecidense	2021	Série D	10	0	2	0	—		—		—		12	0
Aparecidense	2022	Série C	12	1	8	0	—		—		—		20	1
Aparecidense	Total		22	1	11	0	—		—		—		33	1
Atlético Goianiense	2022	Série A	15	1	—		1	0	—		—		16	1
Atlético Goianiense	2023	Série B	18	1	15	0	2	0	—		—		35	1
Atlético Goianiense	Total		33	2	15	0	3	0	—		—		51	2
Mirassol (loan)	2024	Série B	22	0	12	1	2	0	—		—		36	1
Career total			77	3	38	1	5	0	0	0	0	0	120	4

== Honours ==
Aparecidense

- Campeonato Brasileiro Série D: 2021

Fortaleza

- Campeonato Cearense: 2026
