= Júlio Espinosa =

Brazilian football manager (1951–2022)

Personal information
- Full name: Júlio César Castro Espinosa
- Date of birth: 19 December 1951
- Place of birth: Porto Alegre, Brazil
- Date of death: 17 June 2022 (aged 70)
- Position: Left back

Youth career
- Years: Team
- Internacional

Managerial career
- 1984: Brazil Olympic (assistant)
- 1985: Qatar
- 1986: Santos
- 1987: Inter de Limeira
- 1987: Uberaba
- 1987: Pelotas
- 1987–1988: Figueirense
- 1994: Caxias
- 1995: Ypiranga-RS
- 1995: Internacional
- 1996: Honda FC
- 1997: Comercial-SP
- 1998: Chapecoense
- 1998: Sampaio Corrêa
- 1999: Gama
- 1999: Ypiranga-RS
- 2000: América de Natal
- 2001: Náutico
- 2001: Ceará
- 2001: Sport Recife
- 2002: Remo
- 2002: Avaí
- 2003: Moto Club
- 2004: Rio Branco-SP
- 2004: Inter de Limeira
- 2006: Ríver
- 2006: Central
- 2007: 15 de Novembro
- 2008: 15 de Novembro
- 2008–2009: CRB
- 2009: CSA

Júlio César Castro Espinosa (19 December 1951 – 17 June 2022), known as Júlio Espinosa, was a Brazilian football manager.

== Honours ==
Sampaio Corrêa

- Campeonato Maranhense: 1998
