= Lula Pereira =

Brazilian footballer (1956–2021)

Personal information
- Full name: Luiz Carlos Bezerra Pereira
- Date of birth: 6 June 1956
- Place of birth: Olinda, Brazil
- Date of death: 7 February 2021 (aged 64)
- Place of death: Fortaleza, Brazil
- Position: Defender

Senior career*
Years	Team	Apps	(Gls)
1973–1975	Sport Recife		
1975–1979	Santa Cruz		
1980–1986	Ceará		

Managerial career
- 1989–1990: Ceará
- 1993: Ferroviário
- 1994: Rio Branco-SP
- 1994–1995: Figueirense
- 1995: União Sao João
- 1995–1996: Paysandu
- 1996–1997: Criciúma
- 1997: Guarani
- 1998: Rio Branco-SP
- 1999: Ceará
- 2000: Botafogo-SP
- 2000–2001: Portuguesa
- 2001: América Mineiro
- 2002: Flamengo
- 2003: Bahia
- 2004: Ceará
- 2006: Brasiliense
- 2006: Bahia
- 2006–2007: Al-Hazem
- 2008: Ceará
- 2009–2010: Al-Hazem
- 2010: América de Natal
- * Club domestic league appearances and goals

Luiz Carlos "Lula" Bezerra Pereira (6 June 1956 – 7 February 2021) was a Brazilian football player and manager.

== Career ==
Pereira was born in Olinda. A defender, he played for Sport Recife, Santa Cruz and Ceará.

After retiring as a player he worked as a coach at Ceará and also later managed them. He also managed Flamengo in 2002, as well as other clubs including Ferroviário, Portuguesa, Botafogo-SP, Figueirense, Brasiliense, Guarani, Bahia, Criciúma, América de Natal, Paysandu and América Mineiro.

He died on 7 February 2021, aged 64, due to heart problems caused by a stroke in 2019.
