= Copa dos Campeões Cearenses =

Football tournament in Ceará

- Flag of Ceará, the state that hosted the tournament
- Founded: 2014
- Folded: 2019
- Country: Brazil
- State: Ceará
- Confederation: Federação Cearense de Futebol
- Number of clubs: 2
- Last champions: Ferroviário (1st title) (2019)
- Most championships: Fortaleza (2 titles each)
- Website: www.futebolcearense.com.br

The Taça dos Campeões Cearenses (or also known as the Copa dos Campeões Cearenses) was a football competition organized by the Federação Cearense de Futebol (FCF) in a model equivalent to that used in supercups, between the champions of the Campeonato Cearense and the Copa Fares Lopes from the previous year.

The first edition took place in 2014, however, due to the number of substitutions made in the match, which exceeded the limit established for official matches, this edition was considered friendly, and the competition was only made official after its 2016 edition.

The first official dispute took place in 2016 and was held as a round-trip match in which Fortaleza won, being reformulated to take place in a single game from 2017 onwards.

Due to calendar problems, it was no longer played in 2020 and has not been reactivated since then.

== List of champions ==
Season	Champions	Runners-up
2014	Ceará (1)	Barbalha
2016	Fortaleza (1)	Guarany de Sobral
2017	Fortaleza (2)	Guarani de Juazeiro
2018	Floresta (1)	Ceará
2019	Ferroviário (1)	Ceará

== Titles by city ==
City	Championships	Clubs
Fortaleza	5	Fortaleza (2), Ceará (1), Ferroviário (1), Floresta (1)
