= Thiago Carpini =

Brazilian footballer & manager (born 1984)

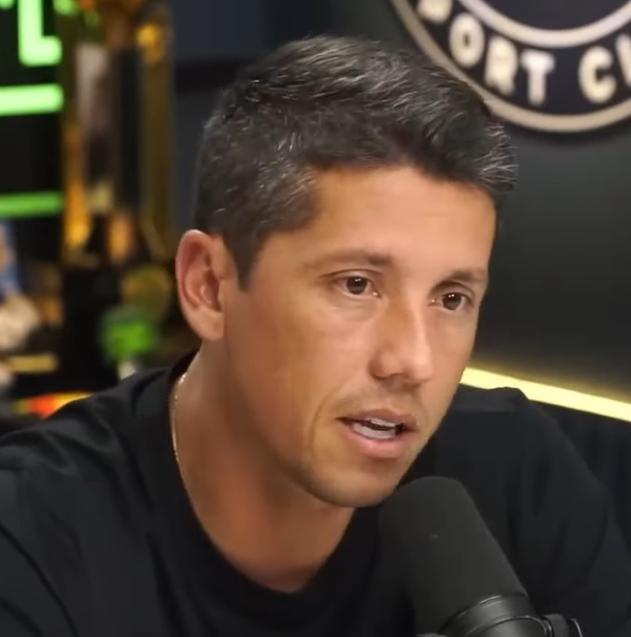
- Carpini in 2023

Personal information
- Full name: Thiago Carpini Barbosa
- Date of birth: 16 July 1984 (age 42)
- Place of birth: Valinhos, Brazil
- Height: 1.85 m (6 ft 1 in)
- Position: Defensive midfielder

Team information
- Current team: Remo (head coach)

Youth career
- Rigesa
- 1999–2000: Paulista
- 2001–2002: Primavera
- 2002–2004: Atlético Paranaense
- 2005: Estrela do Norte

Senior career*
Years	Team	Apps	(Gls)
2004–2005	Guarani Sumareense		
2006	Estrela do Norte		
2006–2007	Ponte Preta	19	(0)
2007–2008	Atlético Mineiro	4	(0)
2008	América de Natal	6	(0)
2009–2010	Bahia	7	(0)
2011	CRAC	15	(4)
2011	Inter de Bebedouro	0	(0)
2012	CRAC	9	(0)
2012	São José-SP	0	(0)
2013	Monte Azul	17	(0)
2013	Novo Hamburgo	0	(0)
2014	Guarani-MG	11	(0)
2014–2016	Guarani	57	(0)
2016	Penapolense	0	(0)
2017	Caldense	11	(0)

Managerial career
- 2018: XV de Piracicaba (assistant)
- 2018–2019: Botafogo-PB (assistant)
- 2019: Guarani (assistant)
- 2019: Guarani (interim)
- 2020: Guarani
- 2020: Oeste
- 2021: Inter de Limeira
- 2022: Santo André
- 2022: Ferroviária
- 2022–2023: Água Santa
- 2023: Juventude
- 2024: São Paulo
- 2024–2025: Vitória
- 2025: Juventude
- 2026: Fortaleza
- 2026–: Remo
- * Club domestic league appearances and goals

Thiago Carpini Barbosa (born 16 July 1984), is a Brazilian professional football coach and former player who played as a defensive midfielder. He is the current head coach of Remo.

== Playing career ==
Born in Valinhos, São Paulo, Carpini made his senior debut with local side Guarani Sumareense in the 2004 Campeonato Paulista Segunda Divisão. In 2006, after playing in the year's Campeonato Capixaba for Estrela do Norte, he signed for Ponte Preta in the Série A.

Carpini made his top tier debut on 31 May 2006, starting in a 1–0 away win over Juventude. On 10 April 2007, he moved to fellow first division side Atlético Mineiro.

In July 2008, after being rarely used at Galo, Carpini agreed to a contract with Série B team América de Natal. On 23 December of that year, he was announced at Bahia.

Carpini began the 2011 season at CRAC, but returned to his home state with Inter de Bebedouro for the year's Copa Paulista. He subsequently rejoined CRAC before finishing the 2012 campaign at São José-SP.

In November 2012, Carpini was included in Monte Azul's squad for the upcoming season. After playing the 2013 Copa FGF with Novo Hamburgo, he represented Guarani-MG in the 2014 Campeonato Mineiro.

On 17 April 2014, Carpini joined Guarani in the Série C. He left the club in 2016 and joined Penapolense.

On 24 April 2017, Carpini was announced at Caldense for the Série D. He asked to leave the club on 6 June, after alleging personal reasons, and retired shortly after.

== Coaching career ==
=== Early career ===
After retiring, Carpini started his coaching career as an assistant of Evaristo Piza at XV de Piracicaba. He followed Piza to Botafogo-PB, before returning to Guarani on 14 June 2019, as a permanent assistant coach.

=== Guarani ===
On 21 August 2019, after Roberto Fonseca's dismissal, Carpini was named interim head coach of Guarani. He was permanently appointed head coach of the club on 25 November, but left on 29 August 2020.

=== Oeste, Inter de Limeira and Santo André ===
On 30 September 2020, Carpini was named head coach of fellow second division team Oeste. He was sacked on 19 October, with the club in the last position.

Carpini was announced at Inter de Limeira on 26 November 2020. He left the club on 14 May 2021, after reaching the quarterfinals of the Campeonato Paulista.

On 4 October 2021, Carpini took over Santo André for the upcoming Paulistão. He also reached the quarterfinals of the tournament with the side before leaving.

=== Ferroviária ===
On 28 March 2022, Carpini replaced Elano at the helm of Série D side Ferroviária. He was dismissed on 23 May, after a poor run of form.

=== Água Santa ===
Eight days after leaving AFE, Carpini was appointed Água Santa head coach for the Copa Paulista. He led the club to the finals of the 2023 Campeonato Paulista, losing to Palmeiras; despite finishing second, he was named the tournament's best head coach.

=== Juventude ===
Carpini departed Água Santa on 13 May 2023 to take over Juventude in division two. With Ju in the penultimate position in his arrival, he renewed his contract with the club on 1 September, and led them to promotion in the 2023 Série B.

=== São Paulo ===
On 11 January 2024, it was announced that Carpini had agreed to become São Paulo's head coach in the place of Dorival Júnior; Tricolor paid a R$ 1 million fee for the coach. Under his leadership, São Paulo won the 2024 Supercopa do Brasil over rivals Palmeiras, with Carpini becoming the youngest head coach in the century to win a top tier title, at the age of 39. In the 2024 Campeonato Paulista, however, the club was knocked out in the quarterfinals by Novorizontino.

Carpini was sacked on 18 April 2024, after a poor start in both the 2024 Copa Libertadores and the Série A.

=== Vitória ===
On 14 May 2024, Carpini replaced Léo Condé at the helm of Vitória also in the top tier. On 9 July of the following year, after being knocked out of the 2025 Copa do Nordeste to Confiança, he was dismissed.

=== Juventude return ===
On 4 August 2025, Juventude announced the return of Carpini as head coach. On 4 December, with the club already relegated, he announced he would leave the club at the end of the season.

=== Fortaleza ===
On 11 December 2025, Carpini was appointed head coach of Fortaleza, also relegated to the second division, on a one-year deal. On 23 July of the following year, despite being 5th in the table, he was sacked.

=== Remo ===
On 16 September 2026, Carpini returned to the top tier after being appointed head coach of Remo.

== Career statistics ==
Club	Season	League			State League		Cup		Continental		Other		Total	
Club	Season	Division	Apps	Goals	Apps	Goals	Apps	Goals	Apps	Goals	Apps	Goals	Apps	Goals
Ponte Preta	2006	Série A	12	0	—		—		—		—		12	0
Ponte Preta	2007	Série B	0	0	7	0	1	0	—		—		8	0
Ponte Preta	Total		12	0	7	0	1	0	—		—		20	0
Atlético Mineiro	2007	Série A	2	0	—		—		—		—		2	0
Atlético Mineiro	2008	Série A	0	0	2	0	0	0	—		—		2	0
Atlético Mineiro	Total		2	0	2	0	0	0	—		—		4	0
América de Natal	2008	Série B	6	0	—		—		—		—		6	0
Bahia	2009	Série B	0	0	6	0	1	0	—		—		7	0
Bahia	2010	Série B	0	0	1	0	0	0	—		1 (Note: Appearance(s) in Copa do Nordeste)	0	2	0
Bahia	Total		0	0	7	0	1	0	—		1	0	9	0
CRAC	2011	Goiano	—		15	4	—		—		—		15	4
Inter de Bebedouro	2011	Paulista A3	—		0	0	—		—		12 (Note: Appearance(s) in Copa Paulista)	1	12	1
CRAC	2012	Goiano	—		9	0	—		—		—		9	0
São José-SP	2012	Paulista A2	—		0	0	—		—		0	0	0	0
Monte Azul	2013	Paulista A2	—		17	0	—		—		—		17	0
Novo Hamburgo	2013	Gaúcho	—		0	0	—		—		2 (Note: One appearance in Copa Metropolitana, one appearance in Copa FGF)	0	2	0
Guarani-MG	2014	Mineiro	—		11	0	—		—		—		11	0
Guarani	2014	Série C	12	0	—		—		—		—		12	0
Guarani	2015	Série C	12	0	15	0	—		—		—		27	0
Guarani	2016	Série C	0	0	18	0	—		—		—		18	0
Guarani	Total		24	0	33	0	—		—		—		57	0
Penapolense	2016	Paulista A2	—		0	0	—		—		0	0	0	0
Caldense	2017	Série D	2	0	9	0	1	0	—		—		12	0
Career total			46	0	110	4	3	0	0	0	15	1	174	5

== Managerial statistics ==
As of 21 July 2026

Managerial record by team and tenure
Team	Nat	From	To	Record								Ref
Team	Nat	From	To	G	W	D	L	GF	GA	GD	Win %	Ref
Guarani	(Brazil)	21 August 2019	29 August 2020	42	15	9	18	42	46	−4	35.71	
Oeste	(Brazil)	30 September 2020	19 October 2020	4	0	1	3	2	9	−7	0.00	
Inter de Limeira	(Brazil)	26 November 2020	14 May 2021	13	6	0	7	9	16	−7	46.15	
Santo André	(Brazil)	4 October 2021	28 March 2022	13	3	6	4	11	11	+0	23.08	
Ferroviária	(Brazil)	22 March 2022	23 May 2022	6	1	2	3	11	6	+5	16.67	
Água Santa	(Brazil)	31 May 2022	13 May 2023	27	9	12	6	29	29	+0	33.33	
Juventude	(Brazil)	13 May 2023	11 January 2024	32	17	11	4	39	24	+15	53.13	
São Paulo	(Brazil)	11 January 2024	18 April 2024	18	7	6	5	26	19	+7	38.89	
Vitória	(Brazil)	14 May 2024	9 July 2025	75	29	22	24	89	74	+15	38.67	
Juventude	(Brazil)	4 August 2025	7 December 2025	22	6	6	10	24	34	−10	27.27	
Fortaleza	(Brazil)	11 December 2025	23 July 2026	42	22	11	9	51	34	+17	52.38	
Remo	(Brazil)	16 September 2026	present	0	0	0	0	0	0	+0	—	
Total				292	115	85	92	333	302	+31	39.38	—

== Honours ==
=== Manager ===
Água Santa

- Campeonato Paulista runner-up: 2023

Juventude

- Campeonato Brasileiro Série B runner-up: 2023

São Paulo

- Supercopa do Brasil: 2024

Fortaleza

- Campeonato Cearense: 2026

=== Individual ===
- Campeonato Paulista Best Head Coach: 2023
