= Pierre (footballer, born 2002) =

Brazilian footballer (born 2002)

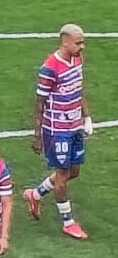
- Pierre playing for Fortaleza in 2025

Personal information
- Full name: Pierre Wagner Oliveira dos Santos
- Date of birth: 12 March 2002 (age 24)
- Place of birth: Rio de Janeiro, Brazil
- Height: 1.81 m (5 ft 11 in)
- Position: Midfielder

Team information
- Current team: Fortaleza
- Number: 5

Youth career
- 2018–2019: Figueirense
- 2020–2023: Tombense
- 2020–2023: → Athletico Paranaense (loan)

Senior career*
Years	Team	Apps	(Gls)
2020–2025	Tombense	39	(0)
2020–2023	→ Athletico Paranaense (loan)	9	(0)
2024	→ Guarani (loan)	12	(0)
2025	→ Volta Redonda (loan)	31	(0)
2025	→ Fortaleza (loan)	13	(0)
2026–	Fortaleza	32	(0)
- * Club domestic league appearances and goals as of 15 August 2026

Pierre Wagner Oliveira dos Santos (born 12 March 2002), simply known as Pierre, is a Brazilian footballer who plays as a midfielder for Fortaleza.

== Career ==
Born in Rio de Janeiro, Pierre joined Figueirense's youth sides in March 2018. Ahead of the 2020 season, he joined Tombense, but moved to Athletico Paranaense on loan later in that year and returned to the under-20s.

Pierre made his first team – and Série A – debut with Furacão on 9 December 2021, coming on as a second-half substitute for Pedrinho in a 1–1 away draw against Sport Recife. He featured mainly with the under-20 side in the following years, before returning to his parent club Tombense on 11 April 2023.

On 31 August 2024, Guarani announced the signing of Pierre on loan until the end of the year. On 6 January of the following year, after suffering relegation, he moved to fellow Série B side Volta Redonda also in a temporary deal.

On 20 August 2025, still owned by Tombense, Pierre moved to Fortaleza in the top tier until December.

== Career statistics ==
As of 27 August 2025

Club	Season	League			State League		Cup		Continental		Other		Total	
Club	Season	Division	Apps	Goals	Apps	Goals	Apps	Goals	Apps	Goals	Apps	Goals	Apps	Goals
Athletico Paranaense	2021	Série A	1	0	0	0	0	0	0	0	—		1	0
Athletico Paranaense	2022	Série A	0	0	7	0	0	0	0	0	—		7	0
Athletico Paranaense	Total		1	0	7	0	0	0	0	0	—		8	0
Tombense	2023	Série B	15	0	—		1	0	—		—		16	0
Tombense	2024	Série C	16	0	6	0	1	0	—		—		23	0
Tombense	Total		31	0	6	0	2	0	—		—		39	0
Guarani	2024	Série B	12	0	—		—		—		—		12	0
Volta Redonda	2025	Série B	19	0	12	0	—		—		—		31	0
Fortaleza	2025	Série A	0	0	—		—		—		—		0	0
Career total			63	0	25	0	2	0	0	0	0	0	90	0

== Honours ==
Fortaleza

- Campeonato Cearense: 2026
