= Vitinho (footballer, born 2001) =

Brazilian footballer

Personal information
- Full name: Vitor Samuel Ferreira Arantes
- Date of birth: 23 April 2001 (age 25)
- Place of birth: Acreúna, Goiás, Brazil
- Height: 1.69 m (5 ft 6 1/2 in)
- Position: Winger

Team information
- Current team: Fortaleza (on loan from Tijuana)
- Number: 11

Youth career
- São Paulo

Senior career*
Years	Team	Apps	(Gls)
2021–2022	São Paulo	2	(0)
2022–2025	Atlético San Luis	97	(18)
2025–	Tijuana	4	(0)
2026–	→ Fortaleza (loan)	29	(10)
- * Club domestic league appearances and goals as of 27 July 2026

Vitor Samuel Ferreira Arantes (born 23 April 2001), known simply as Vitinho, is a Brazilian professional footballer who plays as a winger for Campeonato Brasileiro Série B and Campeonato Cearense club Fortaleza, on loan from Liga MX club Tijuana.

== Club career ==
Vitinho made his professional debut for São Paulo on 25 April 2021 in a 3–0 victory against Ituano.

On 12 June 2022, it was announced that Vitinho had signed for Liga MX club Atlético San Luis, before the start of the 2022 Apertura. He played his first game for the club on 3 July 2022, coming on as a substitute for Andrés Iniestra in a 2–1 defeat against Club León.

On 16 July 2025, Vitinho joined fellow Liga MX club Tijuana.

== Career statistics ==
As of 21 February 2024

Club	Season	League			State League		Cup		Continental		Other		Total	
Club	Season	Division	Apps	Goals	Apps	Goals	Apps	Goals	Apps	Goals	Apps	Goals	Apps	Goals
São Paulo	2021	Série A	0	0	2 (Note: Appearance(s) in Campeonato Paulista)	0	0	0	0	0	—		2	0
Atlético San Luis	2022–23	Liga MX	35	3	–		–		–		–		35	3
Atlético San Luis	2023–24	Liga MX	34	8	–		–		–		2 (Note: Appearance(s) in Leagues Cup)	0	36	8
Atlético San Luis	2024–25	Liga MX	18	3	–		–		–		2	0	20	3
Total			87	14	0	0	0	0	0	0	4	0	91	14
Career total			87	14	2	0	0	0	0	0	4	0	93	14

== Honours ==
São Paulo

- Campeonato Paulista: 2021

Fortaleza

- Campeonato Cearense: 2026
