= Kaio Henrique =

Brazilian footballer (born 2006)

Personal information
- Full name: Kaio Henrique Diogo Domingos
- Date of birth: 22 March 2006 (age 20)
- Place of birth: São Paulo, Brazil
- Height: 1.74 m (5 ft 9 in)
- Position: Left-back

Team information
- Current team: Fortaleza

Youth career
- 2021-2024: Corinthians

Senior career*
Years	Team	Apps	(Gls)
2024-	FC Porto B	45	(0)
2024-	Fortaleza	0	(0)
- * Club domestic league appearances and goals as of 18 May 2026

Kaio Henrique Diogo Domingos (born 22 March 2006), known as Kaio Henrique, is a Brazilian professional footballer who plays as a Left-back for Fortaleza.

== Career ==
Born in São Paulo, in the state of São Paulo, Kaio Henrique began his footballing development in the youth academy of Corinthians, one of Brazil's most distinguished breeding grounds for young talent. He progressed through the Alvinegro's age-group sides from the U15 level in 2021, representing the club at U17 level across the 2022 and 2023 seasons and earning a promotion to the U20 squad in 2024.

In mid-2024, Kaio Henrique completed a free transfer to Portuguese side FC Porto B, the reserve team of FC Porto, with the move officialising his step into senior football. The left-back signed a contract running until June 2029, with a release clause reported at €30 million.

== Career statistics ==
As of 11 May 2026

Appearances and goals by club, season and competition
Club	Season	League			Cup		Other		Total	
Club	Season	Division	Apps	Goals	Apps	Goals	Apps	Goals	Apps	Goals
FC Porto B	2024-25	Liga Portugal 2	16	0	—		—		16	0
FC Porto B	2025-26	Liga Portugal 2	28	0	—		—		28	0
FC Porto B	Total		44	0	—		—		44	0
Career total			44	0	—		—		44	0
