= Maílton =

Brazilian footballer (born 1998)

Personal information
- Full name: Maílton dos Santos de Sá
- Date of birth: 31 May 1998 (age 28)
- Place of birth: Paraíso do Norte, Brazil
- Height: 1.69 m (5 ft 7 in)
- Position: Right-back

Team information
- Current team: Fortaleza
- Number: 22

Youth career
- –2018: Palmeiras

Senior career*
Years	Team	Apps	(Gls)
2018–2019	Palmeiras	0	(0)
2018	→ Santa Cruz (loan)	13	(0)
2019	Mirassol	8	(0)
2019	→ Operário Ferroviário (loan)	28	(4)
2020–2022	Atlético Mineiro	9	(1)
2020–2021	→ Coritiba (loan)	8	(0)
2021–2022	→ Metalist Kharkiv (loan)	5	(0)
2022–2025	Metalist Kharkiv	0	(0)
2022	→ Chapecoense (loan)	14	(1)
2023	→ Ponte Preta (loan)	28	(3)
2024–2025	→ Chapecoense (loan)	63	(9)
2025–	São Paulo	8	(0)
2026–	→ Fortaleza (loan)	15	(2)
- * Club domestic league appearances and goals as of 5 April 2026

Maílton dos Santos de Sá (born 31 May 1998), known simply as Maílton, is a Brazilian professional footballer who plays as a right-back for Campeonato Brasileiro Série B club Fortaleza, on loan from São Paulo.

== Career ==
Maílton moved to Metalist Kharkiv on a permanent contract on 1 July 2022.

In summer 2022 he moved to Chapecoense, where he played 14 matches scoring one goal. In December 2022 he returned to Metalist Kharkiv.

In December 2022, he moved on loan to Ponte Preta.

== Honours ==
Atlético Mineiro

- Campeonato Mineiro: 2020

Fortaleza

- Campeonato Cearense: 2026
