= Barbalha Futebol Clube =

Barbalha
- Full name: Barbalha Futebol Clube
- Nickname(s): Raposa dos Verdes (Green Fox); Canaviais
- Founded: January 1, 2002 (23 years ago)
- Ground: Inaldão, Barbalha, Ceará state, Brazil
- Capacity: 3,000
Home colours	Away colours

Barbalha Football Club (F.C.) (Portuguese: Barbalha Futebol Clube, commonly known as Barbalha) is a Brazilian football club based in Barbalha in the state of Ceará in the northeast of Brazil.

== History ==
Barbalha F.C. was founded on 1 January 2002, and began competing professionally in Ceará's second division. Barbalha's first goal was scored by David Alves against the Missão Velha team in 2002, and during its first year, it finished in seventh place. The club remained in the second division until 2005, after which it was relegated.

The team won the Campeonato Cearense Série C while in Ceará's third division in 2007, which resulted in the club being promoted to the second division, although it was relegated again the following year as a result of a 12-point punishment.

The team placed second in the third division behind Uruburetama in 2011, and was promoted to the second division after Paracuru was punished with loss of 10 points. Between 2012 and 2013, Barbalha F.C. was promoted and relegated again after losing to América de Fortaleza on penalties. However, the team won the Copa Fares Lopes title in 2013 after beating Guarany Sporting Club in the final by an aggregate score of 3–3, earning a place in the Copa do Brasil in 2014.

Barbalha played against Cuiabá Esporte Clube at Inaldão in the first phase of the Copa do Brasil in 2014. The match ended with a 0–0 draw. Barbalha played against Cuiabá again in a second match at the Eurico Gaspar Dutra Stadium, but was eliminated after losing 2–0.

While playing in Ceará's second division in 2014, Barbalha F.C. finished in third place without promotion into the first division. That same year, the team played in the Copa dos Campeões Cearenses (Ceará Champions Cup), but was beaten by Ceará Sporting Club 2–0. The following year, the team finished in fifth place and did not qualify for the next phase of the championship. While playing in Ceará's second division in 2016, Barbalha was relegated after placing ninth ahead of only Nova Russas and FC Acopiara.

In 2017, Barbalha F.C. reached the semifinals of the third division, but was beaten by Caucaia Esporte Clube with an aggregate score of 3–2. The following year, the club finished in third place in the second division during the first phase. In the second phase, Barbalha won in the finals against Guarany de Sobral, and both teams were subsequently promoted to the first division. In the 2019 first division, Barbalha won the first phase with 15 points, earning a place in the Copa do Brasil in 2020.

== Honours ==
- Copa Fares Lopes
  - Winners (1): 2013
- Campeonato Cearense Série B
  - Winners (1): 2018
- Campeonato Cearense Série C
  - Winners (1): 2007

== Statistics ==
=== Participation ===
Competition	Seasons	Best ranking	First appearance	Last appearance	P ▲	R ▼
Campeonato Cearense	5	8th (2019, 2020 and 2023)	2019	2024		1
Cearense - Série B	11	Champions (2018)	2002	2022	2	4
Cearense - Série C	7	Champions (2007)	2006	2017	4	
Copa Fares Lopes	3	Champions (2013)	2012	2014		
Copa do Brasil	2	1st phase (2014 and 2020)	2014	2020		

=== Performance ===
==== Copa do Brasil ====
Year	Position
2014	Eliminated in the first phase
2020	Eliminated in the first phase

==== Campeonato Cearense - First Division ====
Year	Position
2019	8th
2020	8th
2021	10th (last place and relegated)
2023	8th
2024	8th

==== Campeonato Cearense - Second Division ====
Year	Position
2002	7th
2003	7th
2004	6th
2005	9th (second from last place and relegated)
2008	10th (last place and relegated)
2012	10th (last place and relegated)
2014	3rd
2015	5th
2016	9th (relegated)
2018	1st (champions and promoted)
2022	2nd (promoted)

==== Campeonato Cearense - Third Division ====
Year	Position
2006	10th
2007	1st (champions and promoted)
2009	6th
2010	7th
2011	2nd (promoted)
2013	2nd (promoted)
2017	3rd (promoted)
