= Luiz Fernando (footballer, born 1996) =

Brazilian footballer

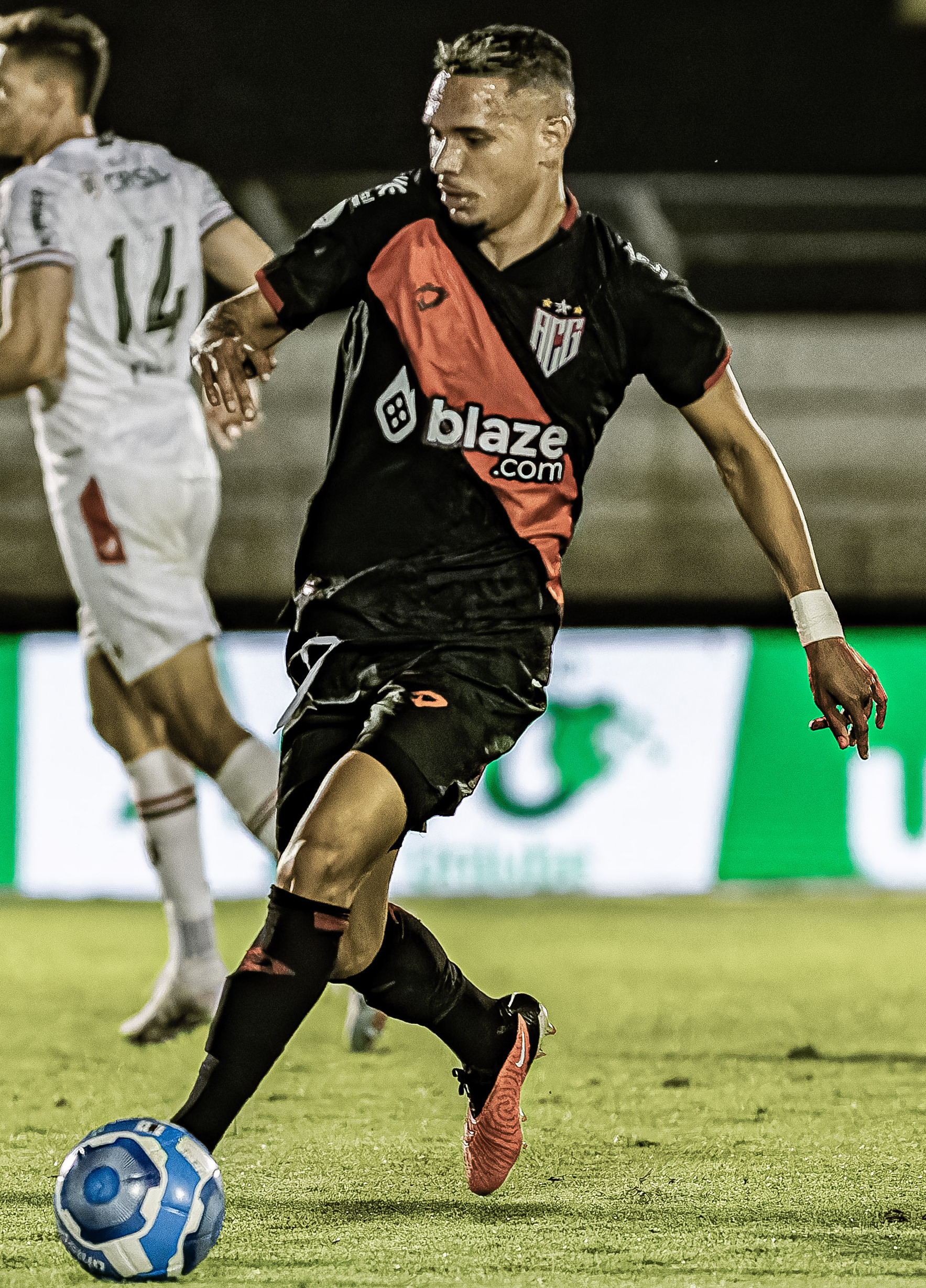
- Luiz Fernando with Atlético Goianense in 2023

Personal information
- Full name: Luiz Fernando Moraes dos Santos
- Date of birth: 16 October 1996 (age 30)
- Place of birth: Tocantinópolis, Brazil
- Height: 1.78 m (5 ft 10 in)
- Position: Winger

Team information
- Current team: Fortaleza
- Number: 32

Youth career
- Atlético Goianiense

Senior career*
Years	Team	Apps	(Gls)
2015–2017	Atlético Goianiense	91	(18)
2018–2022	Botafogo	114	(8)
2020–2021	→ Grêmio (loan)	36	(1)
2022–2024	Atlético Goianense	126	(40)
2025–2026	Athletico Paranaense	51	(8)
2026–	Fortaleza	8	(1)
- * Club domestic league appearances and goals as of 15 April 2026

Luiz Fernando Moraes dos Santos (born 16 October 1996), known as Luiz Fernando, is a Brazilian professional footballer who plays as a winger for Fortaleza.

== Career statistics ==
As of 23 May 2024.

Club	Season	League			State League		Cup		Continental		Other		Total	
Club	Season	Division	Apps	Goals	Apps	Goals	Apps	Goals	Apps	Goals	Apps	Goals	Apps	Goals
Atlético Goianiense	2015	Série B	5	0	5 (Note: Appearance(s) in Campeonato Goiano.)	0	3	0	—		—		13	0
Atlético Goianiense	2016	Série B	26	7	14	2	2	1	—		—		42	10
Atlético Goianiense	2017	Série A	33	9	8	0	1	0	—		—		42	9
Atlético Goianiense	Total		64	16	27	2	6	1	—		—		97	19
Botafogo	2018	Série A	32	3	16 (Note: Appearance(s) in Campeonato Carioca.)	2	1	0	5 (Note: Appearance(s) in Copa Sudamericana.)	2	—		54	7
Botafogo	2019	Série A	32	1	11	1	4	0	6	1	—		53	3
Botafogo	2020	Série A	2	1	9	0	2	1	—		—		13	2
Botafogo	2022	Série A	0	0	12	0	0	0	—		—		12	0
Botafogo	Total		66	5	48	3	7	1	11	3	—		132	12
Grêmio (loan)	2020	Série A	23	1	1 (Note: Appearance(s) in Campeonato Gaúcho.)	0	—		7 (Note: Appearance(s) in Copa Libertadores.)	0	—		31	1
Grêmio (loan)	2021	Série A	9	0	3	0	4	0	4 (Note: One appearance in Copa Libertadores, three appearances and two goals in Copa Sudamericana)	2	—		20	2
Grêmio (loan)	Total		32	1	4	0	4	0	11	2	—		51	3
Atlético Goianiense	2022	Série A	29	2	—		6	0	4	3	—		39	5
Atlético Goianiense	2023	Série B	35	9	15	10	4	0	—		—		54	19
Atlético Goianiense	2024	Série A	5	1	16	11	4	2	—		—		25	14
Atlético Goianiense	Total		69	12	31	21	14	2	4	3	—		118	38
Career total			231	34	110	26	31	4	26	8	0	0	398	72

== Honours ==
=== Club ===
Botafogo

- Campeonato Carioca: 2018

Grêmio

- Campeonato Gaúcho: 2020, 2021

Fortaleza

- Campeonato Cearense: 2026
