= Gabriel Fuentes =

Colombian footballer (born 1997)

Personal information
- Full name: Gabriel Rafael Fuentes Gómez
- Date of birth: 9 February 1997 (age 29)
- Place of birth: Santa Marta, Colombia
- Height: 1.80 m (5 ft 11 in)
- Position: Left-back

Team information
- Current team: Fortaleza
- Number: 18

Senior career*
| Years | Team | Apps | (Gls) |
| 2014–2018 | Barranquilla | 58 | (0) |
| 2018–2024 | Junior | 250 | (9) |
| 2022–2023 | → Zaragoza (loan) | 23 | (0) |
| 2024– | Fluminense | 26 | (0) |
| 2026– | → Fortaleza (loan) | 7 | (0) |

International career^{‡}
| 2017 | Colombia U20 | 2 | (0) |
| 2020 | Colombia U23 | 7 | (0) |
- * Club domestic league appearances and goals as of 15 April 2026 ‡ National team caps and goals as of 00:45, 12 February 2017 (UTC)

Gabriel Rafael Fuentes Gómez (born 9 February 1997) is a Colombian professional footballer who plays as a left-back for Fortaleza, on loan from Fluminense.

== Honours ==
=== Club ===
Junior

- Categoría Primera A (3): 2018–II, 2019–I, 2023-II.
- Superliga Colombiana (2): 2019, 2020.

Fortaleza

- Campeonato Cearense: 2026
