= Bruninho (footballer, born 2005) =

Brazilian footballer (born 2005)

Personal information
- Full name: Bruno César Pereira Silva
- Date of birth: 11 June 2005 (age 21)
- Place of birth: Barra de Guabiraba, Brazil
- Height: 1.77 m (5 ft 10 in)
- Position: Midfielder

Team information
- Current team: Fortaleza
- Number: 41

Youth career
- Porto-PE
- 2024–2025: → Fortaleza (loan)

Senior career*
| Years | Team | Apps | (Gls) |
| 2022–2024 | Porto-PE | 19 | (2) |
| 2025– | Fortaleza | 1 | (0) |
- * Club domestic league appearances and goals as of 14:51, 30 April 2025 (UTC)

Bruno César Pereira Silva (born 11 June 2005), commonly known as Bruninho, is a Brazilian footballer who plays as a midfielder for Fortaleza.

== Career ==
Born in Barra de Guabiraba, Pernambuco, Bruninho was a youth product of Porto-PE. He made his senior debut at the age of 16, helping the club to achieve promotion in the 2022 Campeonato Pernambucano Série A2.

On 21 March 2024, Bruninho moved to Fortaleza on loan, being initially assigned to the under-20 squad. In February of the following year, he was bought outright by the club, signing a contract until 2027 and being promoted to the first team.

Bruninho made his first team – and Série A – debut with Fortaleza on 26 April 2025, starting in a 0–0 away draw against Sport Recife.

== Career statistics ==
As of 30 April 2025

| Club | Season | League | | | State league | | Cup | | Continental | | Other | | Total | |
| Club | Season | Division | Apps | Goals | Apps | Goals | Apps | Goals | Apps | Goals | Apps | Goals | Apps | Goals |
|---|---|---|---|---|---|---|---|---|---|---|---|---|---|---|
| Porto-PE | 2022 | Pernambucano Série A2 | — | | 8 | 0 | — | | — | | — | | 8 | 0 |
| Porto-PE | 2023 | Pernambucano | — | | 2 | 0 | — | | — | | — | | 2 | 0 |
| Porto-PE | 2024 | Pernambucano | — | | 9 | 2 | — | | — | | — | | 9 | 2 |
| Porto-PE | Total | | — | | 19 | 2 | — | | — | | — | | 19 | 2 |
| Fortaleza | 2025 | Série A | 1 | 0 | 0 | 0 | 0 | 0 | 0 | 0 | 0 | 0 | 1 | 0 |
| Career total | | | 1 | 0 | 19 | 2 | 0 | 0 | 0 | 0 | 0 | 0 | 20 | 2 |
