= Lucca Prior =

Brazilian footballer (born 2004)

Personal information
- Full name: Lucca Prior Pimenta
- Date of birth: 12 February 2004 (age 22)
- Place of birth: Franca, Brazil
- Height: 1.73 m (5 ft 8 in)
- Position: Attacking midfielder

Team information
- Current team: Fortaleza
- Number: 38

Youth career
- 2016–2024: Athletico Paranaense
- 2024–2025: Fortaleza

Senior career*
Years	Team	Apps	(Gls)
2025–	Fortaleza	27	(2)
- * Club domestic league appearances and goals as of 15 April 2026

Lucca Prior Pimenta (born 12 February 2004) is a Brazilian footballer who plays as an attacking midfielder for Fortaleza.

== Career ==
Born in Franca, São Paulo, Prior joined Atlético Paranaense's youth sides in 2016, aged 12. In August 2024, he left the club after eight years, and was announced at Fortaleza for the under-20 team.

After playing in the 2025 Copa São Paulo de Futebol Júnior, Prior was promoted to the first team, and made his senior debut on 25 January of that year by coming on as a late substitute for Emmanuel Martínez in a 3–1 Campeonato Cearense away win over Horizonte. He made his Série A debut on 20 April, replacing Calebe in a 2–1 home loss to Palmeiras.

== Career statistics ==
As of 22 April 2025

Club	Season	League			State League		Cup		Continental		Other		Total	
Club	Season	Division	Apps	Goals	Apps	Goals	Apps	Goals	Apps	Goals	Apps	Goals	Apps	Goals
Fortaleza	2025	Série A	1	0	2	0	0	0	0	0	1 (Note: Appearance(s) in Copa do Nordeste)	0	4	0
Career total			1	0	2	0	0	0	0	0	1	0	4	0
