= Rodrigo Santos =

Brazilian footballer (born 2000)

Personal information
- Full name: Rodrigo Oliveira dos Santos
- Date of birth: 18 September 2000 (age 26)
- Place of birth: Vitória da Conquista, Brazil
- Height: 1.78 m (5 ft 10 in)
- Position: Midfielder

Team information
- Current team: Fortaleza
- Number: 29

Youth career
- Bahia

Senior career*
| Years | Team | Apps | (Gls) |
| 2020–2022 | Vitória da Conquista | 30 | (2) |
| 2021 | → Barcelona de Ilhéus (loan) | 5 | (0) |
| 2022–2023 | Grêmio Prudente | 39 | (3) |
| 2024–2025 | Maringá | 45 | (3) |
| 2024 | → Avaí (loan) | 13 | (0) |
| 2025– | Fortaleza | 19 | (1) |
- * Club domestic league appearances and goals as of 15 April 2026

Rodrigo Oliveira dos Santos (born 18 September 2000), known as Rodrigo Santos or just Rodrigo, is a Brazilian footballer who plays as a midfielder for Fortaleza.

== Career ==
Born in Vitória da Conquista, Bahia, Rodrigo played for Bahia as a youth, before returning to hometown club Vitória da Conquista in 2020. In 2021, he was loaned to Barcelona de Ilhéus, and helped the club to win the Campeonato Baiano Segunda Divisão.

On 6 April 2022, Grêmio Prudente announced the signing of Rodrigo. He achieved two consecutive promotions with the club, the first one as champions, before signing for Maringá on 30 November 2023.

On 3 September 2024, after helping Maringá in their promotion from the Série D, Rodrigo was loaned to Série B side Avaí until the end of the year. Back to Dogão for the 2025 campaign, he was a regular starter in the 2025 Campeonato Paranaense as the club reached the finals.

On 11 April 2025, Rodrigo signed a three-and-a-half-year deal with Fortaleza in the Série A, as the club paid R$ 4 million for 60% of his economic rights.

== Career statistics ==
As of 18 April 2025

| Club | Season | League | | | State League | | Cup | | Continental | | Other | | Total | |
| Club | Season | Division | Apps | Goals | Apps | Goals | Apps | Goals | Apps | Goals | Apps | Goals | Apps | Goals |
|---|---|---|---|---|---|---|---|---|---|---|---|---|---|---|
| Vitória da Conquista | 2020 | Série D | 12 | 2 | 2 | 0 | — | | — | | — | | 14 | 2 |
| Vitória da Conquista | 2021 | Baiano | — | | 9 | 0 | — | | — | | — | | 9 | 0 |
| Vitória da Conquista | 2022 | Baiano | — | | 7 | 0 | — | | — | | — | | 7 | 0 |
| Vitória da Conquista | Total | | 12 | 2 | 18 | 0 | — | | — | | — | | 30 | 2 |
| Barcelona de Ilhéus (loan) | 2021 | Baiano 2ª Divisão | — | | 5 | 0 | — | | — | | — | | 5 | 0 |
| Grêmio Prudente | 2022 | Paulista 2ª Divisão | — | | 20 | 0 | — | | — | | — | | 20 | 0 |
| Grêmio Prudente | 2023 | Paulista A3 | — | | 19 | 3 | — | | — | | 13 (Note: Appearance(s) in Copa Paulista) | 2 | 32 | 5 |
| Grêmio Prudente | Total | | — | | 39 | 3 | — | | — | | 13 | 2 | 52 | 5 |
| Maringá | 2024 | Série D | 14 | 3 | 16 | 4 | 2 | 0 | — | | — | | 32 | 7 |
| Maringá | 2025 | Série C | 0 | 0 | 15 | 3 | 2 | 0 | — | | — | | 17 | 3 |
| Maringá | Total | | 14 | 3 | 31 | 7 | 4 | 0 | — | | — | | 49 | 10 |
| Avaí (loan) | 2024 | Série B | 13 | 0 | — | | — | | — | | — | | 13 | 0 |
| Fortaleza | 2025 | Série A | 0 | 0 | — | | — | | 0 | 0 | — | | 0 | 0 |
| Career total | | | 39 | 5 | 93 | 10 | 4 | 0 | 0 | 0 | 13 | 2 | 149 | 17 |
