= Primavera Esporte Clube =

Primavera
- Full name: Primavera Esporte Clube
- Founded: May 13, 2006
- Dissolved: 2011; 15 years ago
- Ground: Cerradão, Primavera do Leste, Mato Grosso state, Brazil
- Capacity: 4,000
Home colours	Away colours

Primavera Esporte Clube, commonly known as Primavera, was a Brazilian football club based in Primavera do Leste, Mato Grosso state, Brazil.

== History ==
The club was founded on May 13, 2006. They were promoted to the 2011 Campeonato Mato-Grossense First Level because Araguaia, champions of the 2010 Campeonato Mato-Grossense Second Level was not able to compete due to financial problems.

== Stadium ==
Primavera Esporte Clube play their home games at Estádio Municipal Antônio Santo Renosto, nicknamed Cerradão. The stadium has a maximum capacity of 4,000 people.
