= Botafogo (disambiguation) =

Botafogo is a beachfront neighborhood (bairro) in Rio de Janeiro, Brazil. The word may also refer to one of the following.

== Football clubs ==
- Botafogo (Cape Verde), Cape Verdean football club

=== Brazil ===
- Botafogo de Futebol e Regatas, Brazilian football club based in Rio de Janeiro
- Associação Botafogo Futebol Clube, Brazilian football club based in Guará, Distrito Federal
- Botafogo Futebol Clube (SP), Brazilian football club based in Ribeirão Preto, São Paulo
- Botafogo Futebol Clube (PB), Brazilian football club based in João Pessoa, Paraíba
- Botafogo Futebol Clube (RO), Brazilian football club based in Porto Velho, Rondônia
- Botafogo Esporte Clube, Brazilian football club based in Teresina, Piauí
- Botafogo Sport Club, Brazilian football club based in Salvador, Bahia
- Botafogo Futebol Clube de Jaguaré, Brazilian football club based in Jaguaré, Espírito Santo

== Other ==
- Botafogo (dance move), a figure in Samba
- Botafogo (galleon), a 16th-century Portugal warship
- Botafogo (horse), an Argentinian racehorse
- Fazenda Botafogo, Rio de Janeiro, a neighborhood in Rio de Janeiro, Brazil
