= Lucas Lima (footballer, born 2000) =

Brazilian footballer

Personal information
- Full name: Lucas Eduardo Lima da Silva
- Date of birth: 4 July 2000 (age 26)
- Place of birth: Magé, Brazil
- Height: 1.80 m (5 ft 11 in)
- Position: Midfielder

Team information
- Current team: São Bernardo
- Number: 14

Youth career
- 2017–2020: São Bento

Senior career*
Years	Team	Apps	(Gls)
2019–2023	São Bento	36	(3)
2020	→ Uberaba (loan)	2	(0)
2022	→ Atlético Goianiense (loan)	7	(0)
2023–2025	São Bernardo	39	(4)
2023	→ CRB (loan)	35	(2)
2025–2026	Ceará	30	(1)
2026–	São Bernardo	18	(4)
- * Club domestic league appearances and goals as of 18 November 2026

Lucas Eduardo Lima da Silva (born 4 July 2000), known as Lucas Lima, is a Brazilian footballer who plays as a midfielder for São Bernardo.

== Club career ==
A São Bento youth graduate, Lucas Lima joined their youth setup in 2017, aged 16. He made his first team debut on 30 November 2019, coming on as a late substitute for Minho in a 2–1 Série B away win over América Mineiro; his side was already relegated.

Lucas Lima subsequently returned to the under-20s before featuring rarely for the side during the 2020 season. In November of that year, he was loaned to Uberaba for the remainder of the Campeonato Mineiro Segunda Divisão.

Lucas Lima returned to Bentão in February 2021, but did not feature until the arrival of Paulo Roberto Santos as manager. On 18 October, he renewed his contract for a further year.

Lucas Lima began the 2022 season as a starter, and scored his first senior goal on 30 January, netting a last-minute equalizer in a 1–1 Campeonato Paulista Série A2 home draw against Primavera. On 29 March, he scored a brace in a 5–1 away routing of XV de Piracicaba, which led his side to the semifinals of the competition.

On 11 April 2022, Lucas Lima moved to Série A side Atlético Goianiense on loan until the end of the year. He made his debut in the category on 14 May, replacing Léo Pereira in a 0–2 away loss against Atlético Mineiro.

== Career statistics ==
As of 11 February 2025

Club	Season	League			State League		Cup		Continental		Other		Total	
Club	Season	Division	Apps	Goals	Apps	Goals	Apps	Goals	Apps	Goals	Apps	Goals	Apps	Goals
São Bento	2019	Série B	1	0	0	0	—		—		—		1	0
São Bento	2020	Série C	3	0	2	0	—		—		—		5	0
São Bento	2021	Série D	2	0	0	0	—		—		6 (Note: Appearance(s) in Copa Paulista)	0	8	0
São Bento	2022	Paulista A2	—		19	3	—		—		—		19	3
São Bento	2023	Paulista	—		9	0	—		—		—		9	0
São Bento	Total		6	0	30	3	—		—		6	0	42	3
Uberaba (loan)	2020	Mineiro 2ª Divisão	—		2	0	—		—		—		2	0
Atlético Goianiense (loan)	2022	Série A	7	0	—		0	0	—		—		7	0
CRB	2023	Série B	35	2	—		1	0	—		—		36	2
São Bernardo	2024	Série C	16	3	11	1	2	0	—		—		29	4
São Bernardo	2025	Série C	0	0	7	0	—		—		—		7	0
São Bernardo	Total		16	3	18	1	2	0	—		—		36	4
Career total			64	5	50	4	3	0	0	0	6	0	123	9
