= Fortaleza Esporte Clube =

Brazilian football club

Fortaleza
- Full name: Fortaleza Esporte Clube
- Nicknames: Laion; Leão do Pici (Lion of the Pici); O Rei Leão do Brasil (Lion King of Brazil); Tricolor; Clube da Garotada (Club of the Youth); Tricolor de Aço (Tricolor of Steel)
- Founded: 23 February 1912; 114 years ago (Fortaleza Football Club) 18 October 1918; 108 years ago (Fortaleza Esporte Clube)
- Ground: Castelão
- Capacity: 63,903
- SAF Owner: Fortaleza EC SAF (100%)
- President: Rolim Machado
- Head coach: Juan Pablo Vojvoda
- League: Campeonato Brasileiro Série B Campeonato Cearense
- 2025 2026: Série A, 18th of 20 (relegated); Cearense, 1st of 10 (winners)
- Website: fortaleza1918.com.br
Home colors	Away colors	Third colors

Fortaleza Esporte Clube (Brazilian Portuguese: [foʁtaˈlezɐ isˈpɔʁtʃi ˈklubi]) is a Brazilian multi-sport club based in Fortaleza, capital of the state of Ceará. Founded on 18 October 1918, primarily a football club, is active in other sports such as futsal, handball and basketball. The club's colors are red, blue and white.

Fortaleza is one of the most successful football clubs in the Brazilian Northeast, having won 46 state league titles and 3 Copa do Nordeste titles. It is placed by surveys as the second biggest fan base in the Northeast, behind only EC Bahia. Its biggest rival is Ceará SC, and clashes between them are called Clássico-Rei (Classic of Kings).

== History ==
On 23 February 1912, Alcides Santos founded a club called Fortaleza, and participated shortly after in the founding of the Stella Foot-Ball Club. Finally, on 18 October 1918, Fortaleza Sporting Club was born, the first denomination of the Fortaleza Esporte Clube. Its colors represent the colors of the French flag, since the founder spent time in France and decided to put the colors of the European country in the Brazilian club.

In 1920, they participated in the foundation of the Associação Cearense de Desportos. That same year they got their first Cearense Championship title.

In 1951, the Municipality of Fortaleza decided to renovate the Presidente Vargas Stadium. The idea of having a private stadium was reborn in the board since it had its own stadium during the 1920s.

In 1957, the club acquired from the land in Bairro do Pici from Mrs. Hedwing, which during the Second World War was where the American military base was in Fortaleza, called Post Command (Command Post), hence the name Pici, transfers it to the Club of Gentilândia in exchange for the new neighborhood. It changed its name to Leão do Pici, a reference to the neighborhood where the Parque dos Campeonatos is located.

The Alcides Santos Stadium opened its doors in June 1962, beating Usina Ceará in the inaugural match.

After finishing in 4th place in the 2021 Campeonato Brasileiro Série A, the club qualified for the Copa Libertadores for the first time in history. In 2023 they finished 2nd place in the Copa Sudamericana, losing to L.D.U. Quito.

== Shield ==
Shields - Fortaleza Esporte Clube

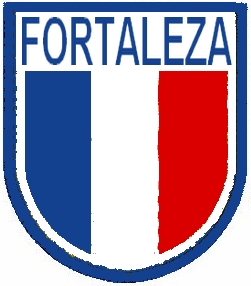
1918

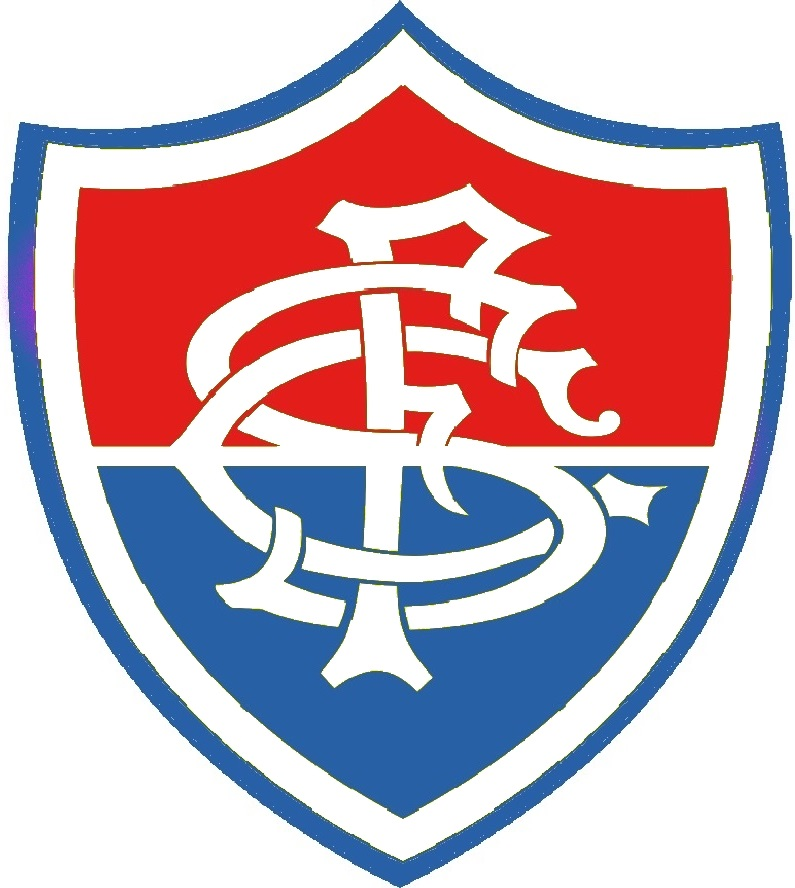
1940s

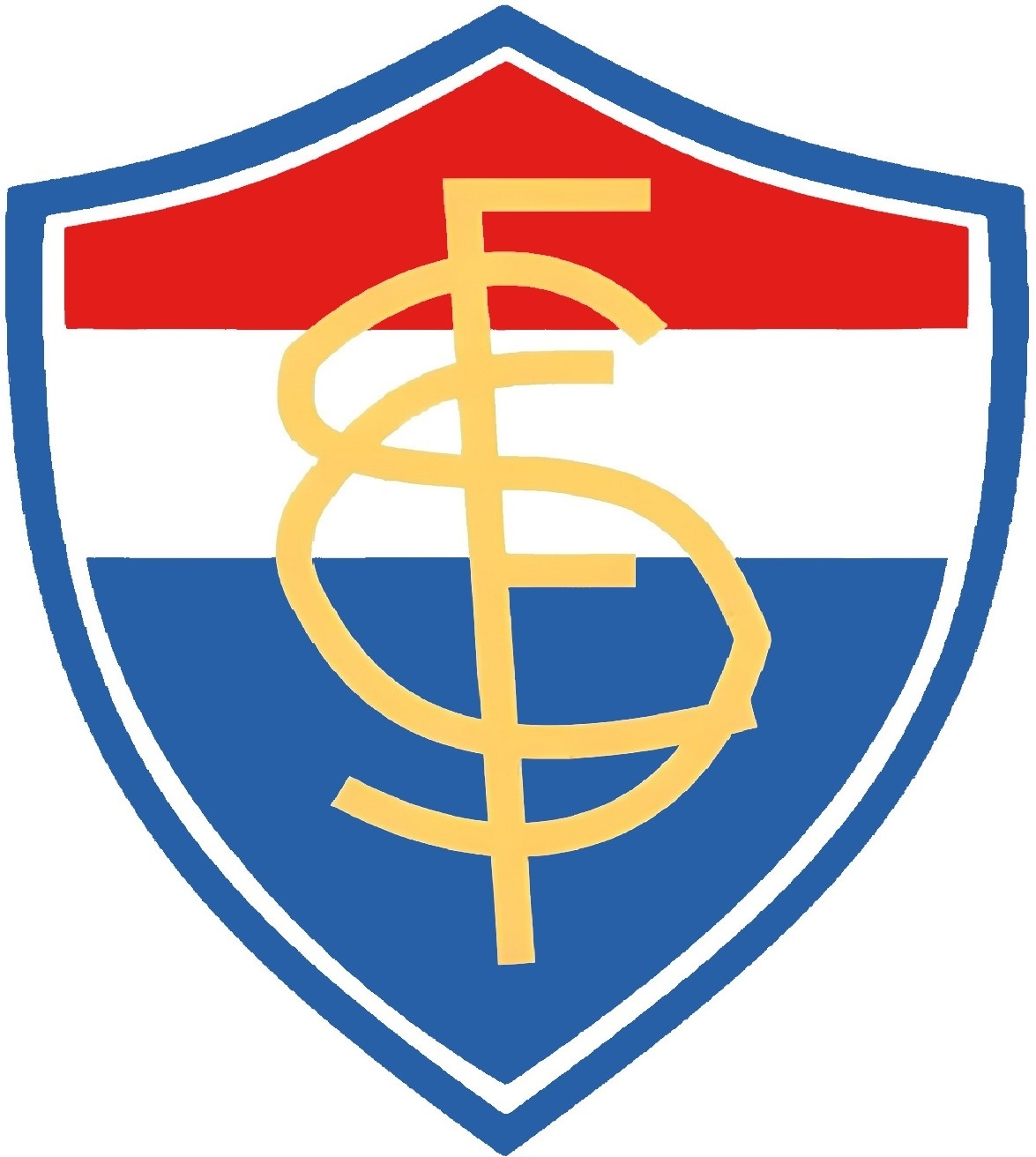
1940s - 1950s

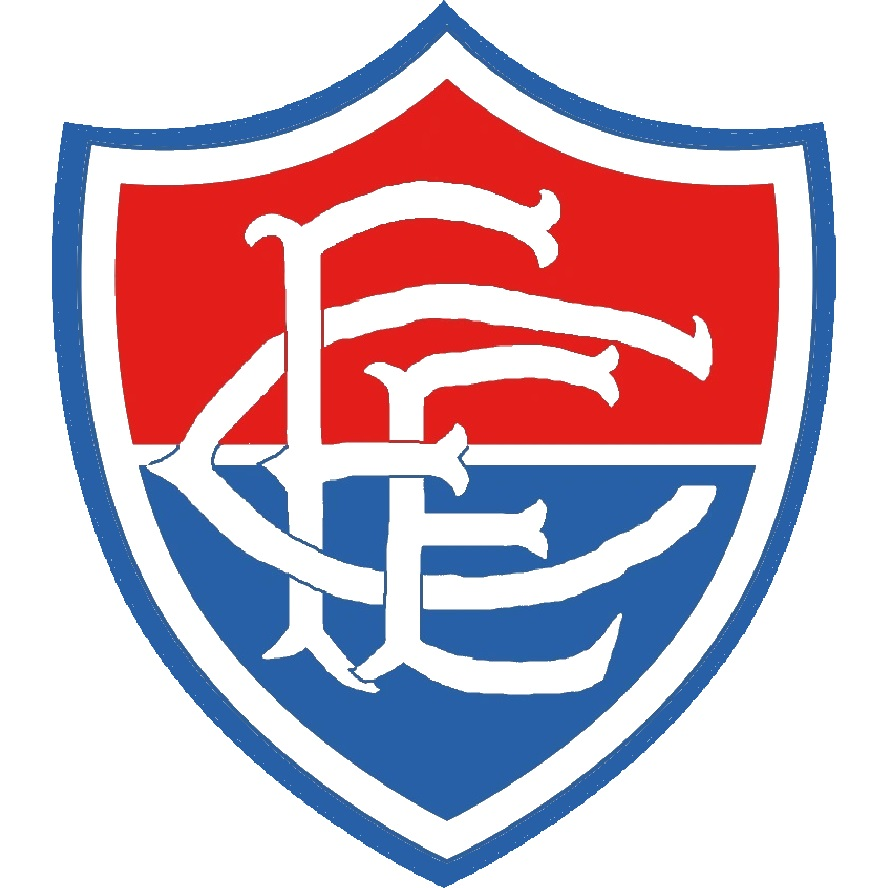
1940s - 1950s

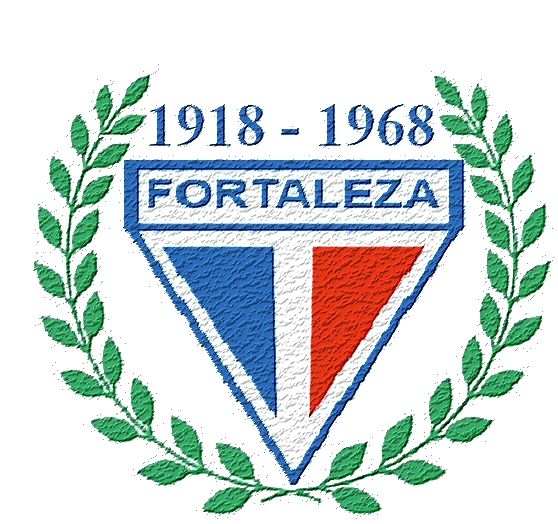
1960s

2019-

== Mascot ==
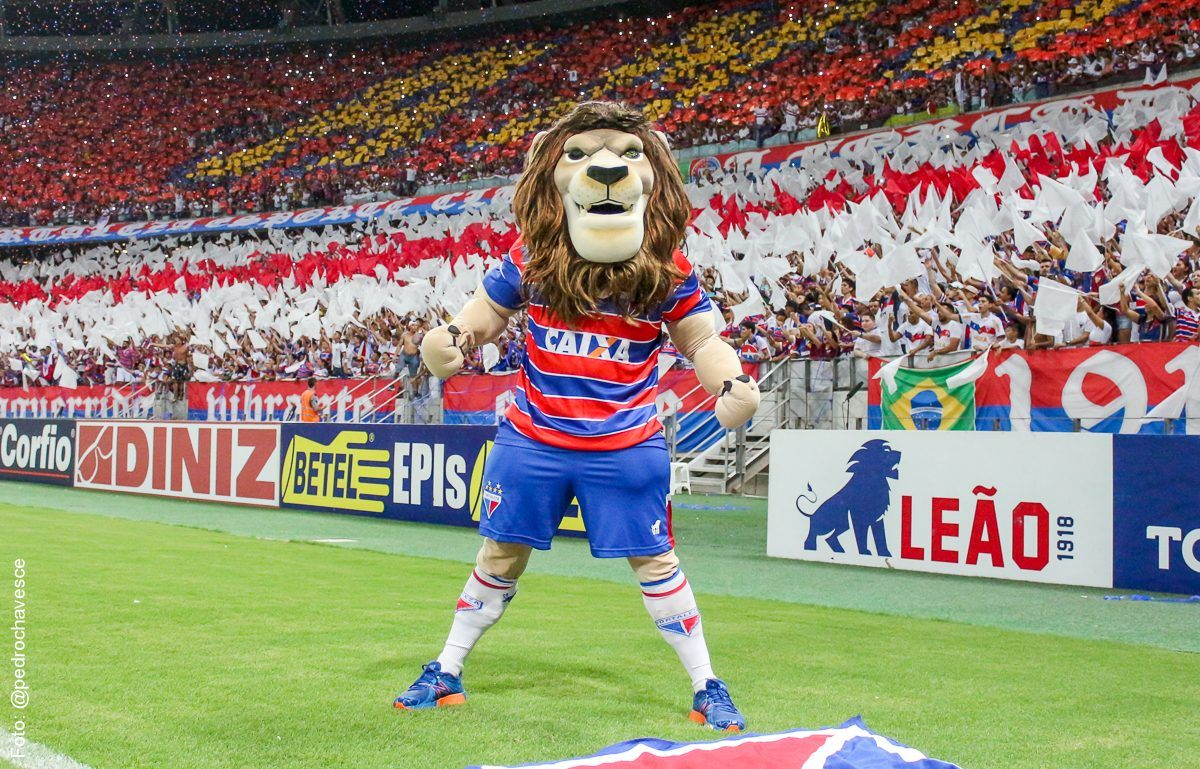
Juba, mascot of Fortaleza

Fortaleza's mascot is a lion named Juba. In the 1960s, a journalist suggested that a lion be used as the club's mascot, inspired by the city of Fortaleza's General Tibúrcio Square, popularly known as Praça dos Leões (Square of Lions).

== Uniform ==
- Home Uniform: Blue and red shirt with blue pants and white socks.
- Away uniform: White and blue shirt with blue pants and blue socks.

=== Uniform Evolution ===
1918-1922	1922-1926	1926-1938	1997	2013	2014	2015-2016

2016-2017	2017	2018

== Statistics ==
- Campeonato Brasileiro Série A
  - Player with most goals scored: Rinaldo (23 goals)
  - Player with most goals scored in a single tournament: Rinaldo (16 goals), in 2005
- All divisions taken in consideration
  - Player with most goals scored: Rinaldo (43 goals); in 2004 (14), 2005 (16), 2006 (11) and 2008 (2)
- Topscorers in national competitions (cups and leagues)
  - Bececê (7 goals), Taça Brasil 1960
  - Rinaldo (14 goals), Campeonato Brasileiro Série B 2004
- Best Série A right-back (Bola de Prata award): Louro, in 1974

== Club structure ==
=== Headquarters ===
The headquarters of Fortaleza lies in the district of Pici, which is a complex consisting of buildings named after prominent figures of the club throughout their history.

=== Stadiums ===
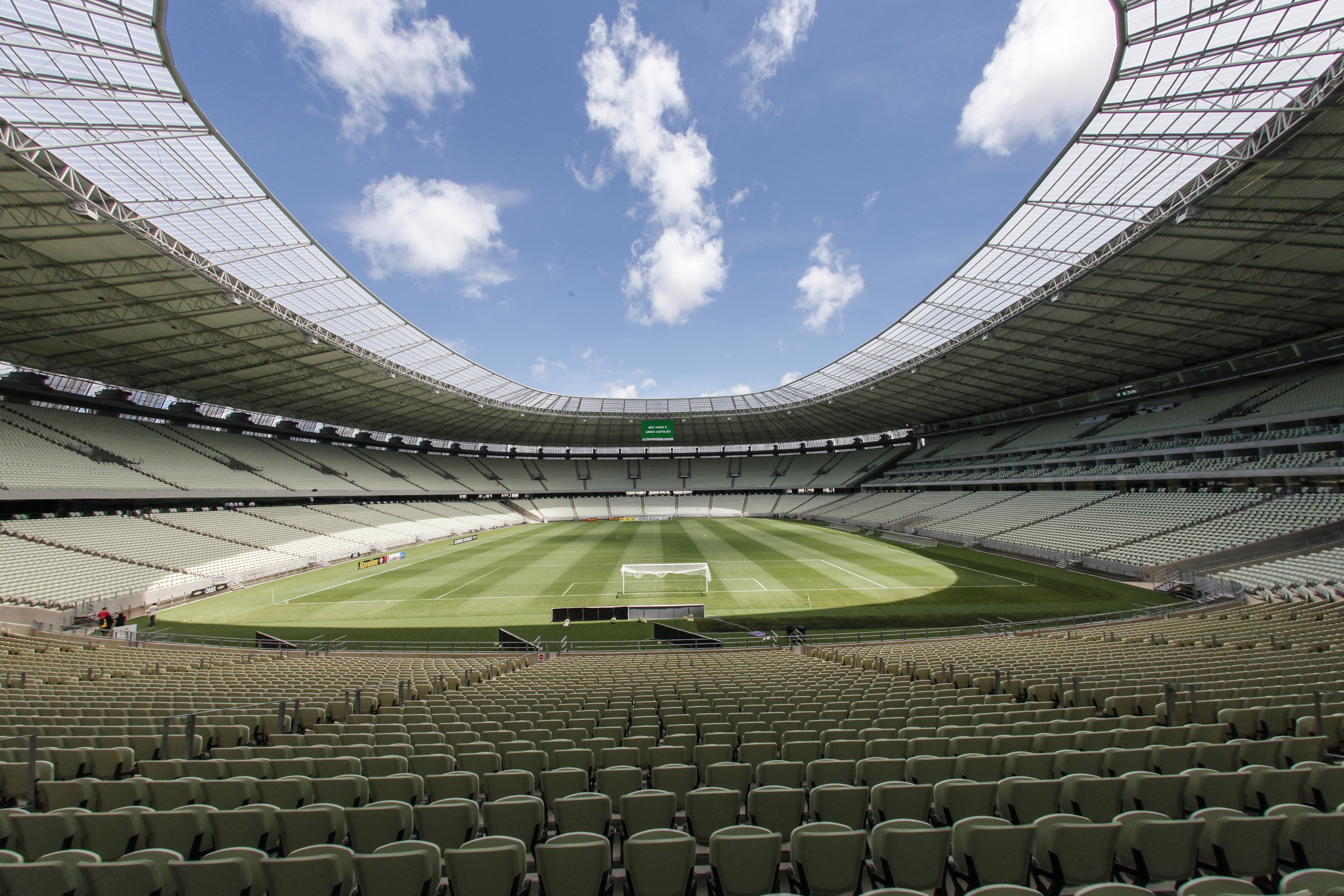
Estádio Castelão

Fortaleza play their games at the 8,300-seater Estádio Alcides Santos, as well as Estádio Castelão, which can hold 63,903 supporters and Estádio Presidente Vargas with a capacity of 20,600.

== Past presidents ==
- Alcides de Castro Santos (1918-1920)
- João Gentil (1920-1923)
- Eurico Salgado Duarte (1923-1924)
- Pedro Riquet Nogueira (1925-1926)
- Francisco Luís de Oliveira (1927-1928)
- Lafayette Tapioca (1929)
- Antônio de Pádua Freire (1930-1932)
- Antenor Vale (1933-1934)
- Osvaldo Moreira Lima (1935-1936)
- João Ramos César de Vasconcelos (1937)
- Heitor Ribeiro (1938)
- Meton Borges (1938)
- Demócrito Freire (1938)
- Francisco Araújo (1939-1940)
- José Milton Holanda Pimentel (1940)
- Pedro Riquet Nogueira (1940)
- Capitão Luís Clóvis de Oliveira (1940-1941)
- Adriano Rodrigues Martins (1941)
- Luís Abner (1941-1942)
- Edmar Vilar de Queiróz (1942)
- Ivan César de Vasconcelos (1942-1943)
- Agapito dos Santos Sátiro (1943-1944)
- Capitão Galileu Saldanha de Menezes (1944-1945)
- Capitão Edmar Rabelo Maia (1945-1946)
- José Mário Belém de Figueiredo (1946-1949)
- Francisco Lorda Filho (1949)
- Mendo Leonel Chaves (1949-1950)
- Otoni Diniz (1950)
- Álvaro Paulo Kruel Viana (1950)
- Amaury Barbosa Gurgel (1951)
- José William Girão Frota (1951)
- Arcelino Costa Leitão (1951-1954)
- Francisco Bezerra de Oliveira (1954-1955)
- Pedro Torres (1955)
- Francisco Bezerra de Oliveira (1955-1956)
- Carlos Rolim Filho (1956-1958)
- Francisco Bezerra de Oliveira (1958)
- Francisco Mozart Cavalcante Gomes (1958)
- José Raimundo Costa (1958-1959)
- Manuel Nunes de Oliveira (1959)
- Antônio Luís do Vale (1959)
- Manuel Nunes de Oliveira (1959-1960)
- Otoni Diniz (1960-1961)
- José Raimundo Costa (1961)
- Otoni Diniz (1961-1963)
- José Orestes Cavalcante (1963)
- Francisco Manhães (1963)
- José Raimundo Costa (1964)
- José Orestes Cavalcante (1964)
- José William Girão Frota (1964-1965)
- Francisco Bezerra de Oliveira (1965)
- José Raimundo Costa (1965-1966)
- Francisco Bezerra de Oliveira (1966-1967)
- José Raimundo Costa (1967)
- Edmilson Barros de Oliveira (1967)
- Renato Brito Bastos (1967)
- Abdias Veras Filho (1967)
- Egberto de Paula Rodrigues (1967)
- Edmilson Xavier Bindá (1967-1968)
- Fares Cândido Lopes (1968)
- Otoni Diniz (1968-1969)
- Egberto de Paula Rodrigues (1969)
- José Raimundo Fontenelle (1969)
- José Cidrão de Oliveira (1970-1971)
- José Edyr Sabóia de Castro (1971-1972)
- General Edmar Rabelo Maia (1972-1975)
- Francisco Alves Maia (1975-1976)
- Airton França Rebouças (1977)
- Cid Liberato Paracampos (1977)
- Deputado Alfredo Machado (1977-1978)
- Otoni Diniz (1978)
- Deputado Alfredo Machado (1978-1979)
- Engenheiro Cássio Borges (1979)
- Ezequiel Menezes Filho (1979)
- José Camilo de Aguiar (1979-1980)
- João de Deus Costa Lima (1980)
- Fares Lopes (1980-1981)
- Silvio Carlos Vieira Lima (1981-1982)
- Hélder Veríssimo de Lima (1982-1983)
- Newton Cavalcante de Castro (1983)
- Ney Rebouças (1983-1984)
- Emanoel Papy Sabóia (1984)
- João de Deus Costa Lima (1984)
- João Gonçalves Monteiro (1984)
- Newton Cavalcante de Castro (1984)
- José Nestor Falcão Filho (1985-1986)
- Silvio Carlos Vieira Lima (1987-1989)
- Mauro Moraes de Lima (1989-1990)
- Paulo Rogério Magalhães (1990)
- Péricles Mulatinho (1990)
- Carlos Alberto Ribeiro (1990)
- Péricles Ribeiro Mulatinho (1991-1992)
- Flávio Novaes (1993)
- Fernando Silva (1993)
- Newton Cavalcante (1994)
- Quintino Feitosa (1994)
- Raimundo Regadas (1994)
- José Raimundo Costa (1995)
- Fernando Silva (1995)
- José Raimundo Costa (1995)
- Souza Filho (1996)
- Ciro Nepomuceno (1996)
- José Raimundo Costa (1996)
- Osvaldo Azim (1996-1998)
- Atanásio dos Santos (1998)
- Ariosvaldo Gomes (1998)
- Leonel Pereira Alencar Neto (1998-1999)
- Jorge Alberto Carvalho Mota (1999-2004)
- Clayton Alcântara Veras (2004)
- José Ribamar Felipe Bezerra (2005-2006)
- Marcelo Desidério (2007-2008)
- Lúcio Bonfim (2008-2009)
- Renan Vieira (2009-2010)
- Paulo Arthur (2011)
- Osmar Baquit (2011-2014)
- Jorge Mota (2014-2017)
- Marcello Desidério (2017)
- Luis Eduardo Girão (2017)
- Marcelo Paz (2017—2023)
- Alex Santiago (2024—2025)
- Rolim Machado (2025—)

== Current squad ==
As of 12 September 2026

Note: Flags indicate national team as defined under FIFA eligibility rules; some limited exceptions apply. Players may hold more than one non-FIFA nationality.

No.	Pos.	Nation	Player
1	GK	BRA	João Ricardo (captain)
3	DF	BRA	Lucas Gazal
4	DF	BRA	Luan Freitas
5	MF	BRA	Pierre
6	DF	ARG	Tomás Cardona
8	MF	BRA	Ronald (on loan from Grêmio)
9	FW	ARG	Juan Miritello (on loan from Defensa y Justicia)
10	MF	BRA	Lucas Crispim
11	FW	BRA	Vitinho (on loan from Tijuana)
12	DF	BRA	Kaio Henrique
13	DF	BRA	Maurício Mucuri (on loan from Londrina)
15	GK	BRA	Magrão
16	FW	BRA	Pedro Henrique
17	FW	BRA	Nathan Fogaça
18	DF	COL	Gabriel Fuentes (on loan from Fluminense)
19	MF	BRA	Lucas Emanoel
20	MF	BRA	Jaílson
21	MF	COL	Juan Cantillo

No.	Pos.	Nation	Player
22	DF	BRA	Maílton (on loan from São Paulo)
23	DF	BRA	Neris (on loan from Vitória)
25	GK	BRA	Vinícius Silvestre
28	DF	BRA	Paulinho
29	MF	BRA	Rodrigo Santos
31	FW	BRA	Welliton (on loan from Primavera)
32	FW	BRA	Luiz Fernando
33	DF	BRA	Kauã Rocha
34	DF	ANG	Bastos
35	MF	BRA	Bruninho
37	MF	BRA	Ryan (on loan from Corinthians)
38	MF	BRA	Lucca Prior
41	GK	BRA	Cássio
75	FW	BRA	Rodriguinho (on loan from Cruzeiro)
77	FW	BRA	Paulo Baya (on loan from Primavera)
88	MF	BRA	Lucas Sasha
91	FW	BRA	Chico da Costa (on loan from Cruzeiro)

=== Youth team ===
Note: Flags indicate national team as defined under FIFA eligibility rules; some limited exceptions apply. Players may hold more than one non-FIFA nationality.

No.	Pos.	Nation	Player
27	FW	BRA	Caio Wesley
30	FW	CHI	Tomás Roco

No.	Pos.	Nation	Player
36	DF	BRA	Guilherme Moura
39	DF	BRA	Cristovam

=== Out on loan ===
Note: Flags indicate national team as defined under FIFA eligibility rules; some limited exceptions apply. Players may hold more than one non-FIFA nationality.

No.	Pos.	Nation	Player
—	DF	CHI	Benjamín Kuscevic (on loan to Toronto until 31 December 2026)
—	DF	ARG	Eros Mancuso (on loan to Estudiantes LP until 31 December 2026)
—	MF	BRA	Matheus Rossetto (on loan to Melbourne City until 30 June 2027)
—	MF	BRA	Calebe (on loan to Internacional until 31 December 2026)
—	MF	BRA	Kauan Rodrigues (on loan to Athletic-MG until 30 November 2026)
—	MF	BRA	Matheus Pereira (on loan to Corinthians until 31 December 2026)

No.	Pos.	Nation	Player
—	MF	ARG	Tomás Pochettino (on loan to Vitória until 31 December 2026)
—	MF	BRA	Pablo Roberto (on loan to Juventude until 30 November 2026)
—	MF	COL	Yeison Guzmán (on loan to América de Cali until 31 December 2027)
—	FW	BRA	Allanzinho (on loan to Juventude until 30 November 2026)
—	FW	BRA	Iarley (on loan to ASA until 30 September 2026)

== Staff ==
=== Current staff ===
As of 8 December 2025.

Position	Name
Coaching staff
Head coach	(Argentina) Juan Pablo Vojvoda
Assistant head coach	(Argentina) Nahuel Martínez
Assistant head coach	(Argentina) Gastón Liendo
Assistant head coach	(Brazil) Reinan Santos
Fitness coach	(Argentina) Luis Aspiazu
Fitness coach	(Brazil) Émerson Santana
Fitness coach	(Brazil) Kelmo Bonatto
Fitness coach	(Brazil) Lucas Martins
Goalkeepers trainer	(Argentina) Santiago Piccinini
Goalkeepers trainer	(Brazil) Guto Albuquerque
Development analyst	(Brazil) Henrique Bittencourt
Development analyst	(Brazil) Leonardo Abreu
Medical staff
Team doctor	(Brazil) Cláudio Maurício
Team doctor	(Brazil) Glay Maranhão
Team doctor	(Brazil) Rafael Veras
Team doctor	(Brazil) Roberto Oliveira
Team doctor	(Brazil) Vinícius Castelo Branco
Physiotherapist	(Brazil) Albino Luciano
Physiotherapist	(Brazil) Egberto Oliveira
Physiotherapist	(Brazil) Patrício Teixeira
Physiotherapist	(Brazil) Ranielson Xavier

== Honours ==
=== Official tournaments ===
National
Competitions	Titles	Seasons
Campeonato Brasileiro Série B	1	2018
Inter-Regional
Competitions	Titles	Seasons
Torneio Norte-Nordeste	1	1970
Regional
Competitions	Titles	Seasons
Copa do Nordeste	3	2019, 2022, 2024
State
Competitions	Titles	Seasons
Campeonato Cearense	47^{s}	1920, 1921, 1923, 1924, 1926, 1927, 1928, 1933, 1934, 1937, 1938, 1946, 1947, 1949, 1953, 1954, 1959, 1960, 1964, 1965, 1967, 1969, 1973, 1974, 1982, 1983, 1985, 1987, 1991, 1992, 1993, 1994, 1995, 1996, 1997, 1998, 1999, 2000, 2001, 2003, 2004, 2005, 2007, 2008, 2009, 2010, 2015, 2016, 2019, 2020, 2021, 2022, 2023, 2026
Copa dos Campeões Cearenses	2	2016, 2017

- record
- ^{s} shared record

=== Others tournaments ===
==== International ====
- Panamaribo Cup (1): 1962

==== National ====
- Torneio Início do Torneio de Integração Nacional (1): 1971

==== Regional and Inter-state ====
- Copa Cidade de Natal (1): 1946
- Zona Norte-Nordeste da Taça Brasil (2): 1960, 1968

==== State ====
- Torneio Início do Ceará (12): 1925, 1927, 1928, 1933, 1935, 1948, 1960, 1961, 1962, 1964, 1965, 1977

=== Runners-up ===
- Copa Sudamericana (1): 2023
- Campeonato Brasileiro Série A (2): 1960, 1968
- Campeonato Brasileiro Série B (2): 2002, 2004
- Campeonato Brasileiro Série C (1): 2017
- Copa do Nordeste (1): 2026
- Campeonato Cearense (28): 1922, 1925, 1929, 1936, 1941, 1944, 1950, 1958, 1968, 1971, 1972, 1975, 1976, 1977, 1978, 1979, 1984, 1986, 1988, 1990, 1997, 2002, 2006, 2012, 2014, 2018, 2024, 2025
- Copa Fares Lopes (1): 2017

=== Women's Football ===
- Campeonato Cearense de Futebol Feminino (4): 2010, 2020, 2022, 2025
