= Ceará Sporting Club =

Brazilian association football club

Ceará
- Full name: Ceará Sporting Club
- Nicknames: Vozão (Big Grandpa); Vovô (Grandpa); Maior do Nordeste (The biggest from the Northeast); O Mais Querido (The Dearest); Campeão da Popularidade (Champion of Popularity); Gigante dos Verdes Mares (Giant of the green sea)
- Founded: June 2, 1914; 112 years ago
- Ground: Castelão
- Capacity: 63,908
- President: João Paulo Silva
- Head coach: Daniel Paulista
- League: Campeonato Brasileiro Série B Campeonato Cearense
- 2025 2025: Série A, 17th of 20 (relegated); Cearense, 1st of 10 (champions)
- Website: www.cearasc.com
Home colors	Away colors

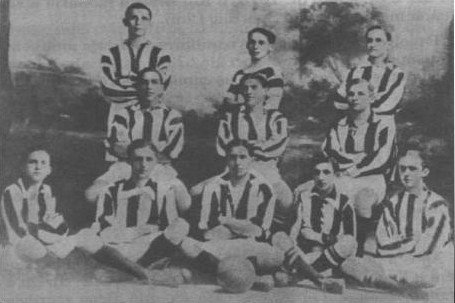
Team photo from the 1915 season

Ceará Sporting Club (Brazilian Portuguese: [seaˈɾa (i)sˈpɔʁtʃĩ ˈklubi]), or simply Ceará, is a Brazilian professional football club from the city of Fortaleza, capital city of the Brazilian state of Ceará.

Founded on June 2, 1914, Ceará is one of the most traditionally successful clubs in the Northeast region of Brazil alongside Bahia, Santa Cruz, Sport, Náutico, Vitória and their city rivals Fortaleza.

== History ==
On June 2, 1914, the club was founded as Rio Branco Football Club by Luiz Esteves Junior and Pedro Freire. Later, seventeen members joined the club. As Rio Branco Football Club, the team colors were white and lilac. In 1915, on their first birthday, the club changed its name to Ceará Sporting Club, and later won their first title in 1922.

In 1941, Ceará won the Campeonato Cearense, the same year of the inauguration of Estadio Presidente Vargas. From 1961 to 1963, the club was three times consecutive state champion. In 1969, Ceará won the Northeast Cup. In 1964, Ceara finished third in Serie A, their best campaign in the top flight to date.

In 1970 the club ended a seven-year state championship title drought. In 1971, Ceará was the last placed team in Campeonato Brasileiro Série A first edition. From 1975 to 1978, the club was state champion four times in a row.

In 1985, Ceará finished seventh in the league, their second best ever position In 1994, the club finished as Brazilian Cup runners-up, beaten by Grêmio in the final. In 1995, Ceará participated in the Copa CONMEBOL, the club's first international championship, becoming the only club of Ceará State to play an international tournament. In 1996, the team administrator was Forró bands businessman Emanuel Gurgel. The team changed its home shirt color to all black. Because of this, the team was nicknamed "Urubu do Nordeste" (Northeast Vulture). From 1996 to 1999, the club was state champion four times in a row .

In 2005, Ceará reached the Copa do Brasil semifinals, where the club was defeated by Fluminense.

In 2010, after a 17-year absence, Ceará was promoted back to the Brazilian League, after finishing third in the 2009 Campeonato Brasileiro Série B. In their first campaign back, Ceara had a great start, unbeaten for eight matches and kicking off their campaign with a win against champions Fluminense. However, their form began to drop with a run of only one victory in twelve matches, including a heavy 5–0 loss to Avaí. Ceara eventually finished in 12th position, achieving a place in the Copa Sudamericana.

In the 2011 Copa Sudamericana, they were eliminated by Sao Paulo in the first round, despite having won the first leg. Later that year, Ceará reached the Copa do Brasil semi-finals. Vozao ended Ronaldinho's Flamengo's unbeaten streak in the quarter-finals with a victory in the Engenhao, then drew the home game, eliminating the Rio de Janeiro team in a notorious upset. Ceará, however, was defeated by Coritiba in the semi-finals. Also that year, they won their first Campeonato Cearense in five years, paving the way for four consecutive state titles from 2011 to 2014. However, the club was relegated from the Serie A. After having begun the season poorly, a run of four wins in seven matches seemed to steer the club to safety in the ninth position after a win against Athletico Paranaense, but then a spell with only one win in thirteen matches, including four successive defeats brought them into the relegation zone, and their relegation was confirmed with a loss to Bahia.

In February 2014, the Cidade Vozao – Luis Campos Training center was inaugurated. This is where the club houses its youth teams and where the first-team trains.

In 2015, Ceara won their first Copa do Nordeste, eliminating Vitoria on away goals before defeating Bahia over two legs. However, the team struggled in Série B, only finishing two points above the relegation zone. In 2018, they achieved promotion and finished 15th in the league that season. In 2020, the club won their second Copa do Nordeste, finished eleventh in Serie A, and gained qualification to the Copa Sudamericana, their first in a decade.

In 2021, they finished eleventh again, and qualified for the 2022 Copa Sudamericana, where they had a great campaign, winning all matches in the group stage which included powerhouse Independiente de Avellaneda, then beating The Strongest 5–1 on aggregate before losing to finalists São Paulo on penalties in the quarter-finals. However, the Copa Sudamericana campaign put stress on the squad and they were not able to keep up with the pace of the league, causing relegation after a seventeenth-placed finish.

== Honours ==
=== Official tournaments ===
Regional
Competitions	Titles	Seasons
Copa do Nordeste	3	2015, 2020, 2023
Torneio Norte-Nordeste	1^{s}	1969
State
Competitions	Titles	Seasons
Campeonato Cearense	47^{s}	1915, 1916, 1917, 1918, 1919, 1922, 1925, 1931, 1932, 1939, 1941, 1942, 1948, 1951, 1957, 1958, 1961, 1962, 1963, 1971, 1972, 1975, 1976, 1977, 1978, 1980, 1981, 1984, 1986, 1989, 1990, 1992, 1993, 1996, 1997, 1998, 1999, 2002, 2006, 2011, 2012, 2013, 2014, 2017, 2018, 2024, 2025

- record
- ^{s} shared record

=== Others tournaments ===
==== Regional and Inter-state ====
- Zona Norte-Nordeste da Taça Brasil (1): 1964
- Taça Asa Branca (1): 2016

==== State ====
- Copa dos Campeões Cearenses (1): 2014
- Torneio Início do Ceará (12): 1922, 1923, 1926, 1932, 1936, 1937, 1943, 1947, 1952, 1953, 1967, 1978

=== Runners-up ===
- Copa do Brasil (1): 1994
- Copa do Nordeste (2): 2014, 2021
- Campeonato Cearense (27): 1924, 1933, 1943, 1952, 1959, 1964, 1965, 1966, 1969, 1970, 1973, 1974, 1985, 1987, 1991, 1994, 2000, 2001, 2004, 2009, 2010, 2015, 2019, 2020, 2021, 2023, 2026
- Copa dos Campeões Cearenses (2): 2018, 2019

=== Youth team ===
- Campeonato Brasileiro Sub-23 (1): 2020

=== Women's Football ===
- Campeonato Brasileiro de Futebol Feminino Série A2 (1): 2022
- Campeonato Cearense de Futebol Feminino (5): 2018, 2019, 2021, 2023, 2024

== Stadium ==
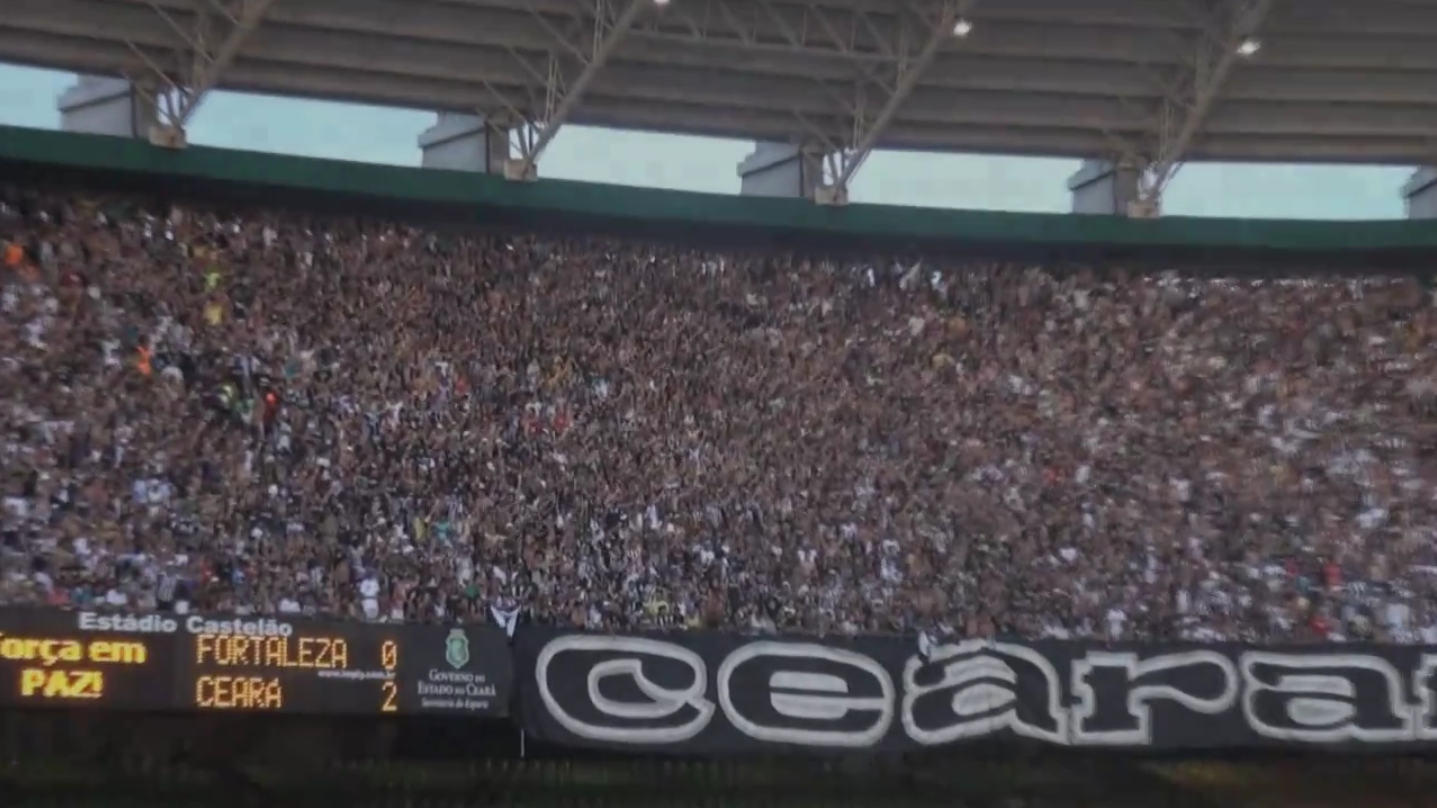
Ceará supporters at the Estádio Governador Plácido Aderaldo Castelo (Castelão)

Ceará's home venue is Estádio Carlos de Alencar Pinto, capacity 3,000, but the team also plays at Estadio Castelão for big games and finals, which has a capacity of 60,326, and at Presidente Vargas Stadium, which has a 22,228 capacity.

== Rivals ==
Ceará's greatest rival is Fortaleza, and the match between the two clubs is known as Clássico Rei. It has been played 603 times, with Ceará winning 213 times, Fortaleza winning 187 times and 203 draws. Ceará's second biggest rival is Ferroviário, the third biggest club of Fortaleza city, and the match is known as Clássico da Paz. This derby has been played 302 times, with 140 wins for Ceará, 71 wins for Ferroviário and 91 draws.

== Mascot ==
The team's mascot, an old man known as "Vovô" ("Grandpa") was designed by cartoonist Mino, a native of Ceará, for the "Ceará: Paixão Total" Project ("Ceará: Full Passion" Project).

The "grandpa" figure appeared in late 1919, when Meton de Alencar Pinto, former president of Ceará SC, coached young players of América Football Club, a small club from the city, in the Porangabussu training center. Meton, who used to call these young players as his "grandsons", asked them to "go easy on grandpa". Afterwards, the nickname started to apply to the team of Ceará as well, helped by the seniority of the club; Ceará Sporting Club was the first football team founded in the state.

== Supporters ==
Ceara is the best supported club in the state, and third in the Northeast, behind Bahia and Sport, according to a recent study by GloboEsporte.com. Vozao has approximately 1.6 million supporters.

== Logo evolution ==

The first logo was the club's first as Ceará Sporting Club, and was used from 1915 to 1954.

The second logo was used from 1955 to 1969 and was inspired by the Santos logo.

The third logo was used from 1970 to 2003, which removed the ball found in the top left corner of the previous logo, and added a white outline.

The fourth logo is the current team logo, and was adopted in 2003. The logo is a restyled version of the previous logo created by Adman Orlando Mota. This logo introduced the white stars and the foundation date.

== Players ==
=== First-team squad ===
As of 3 October 2026

Note: Flags indicate national team as defined under FIFA eligibility rules; some limited exceptions apply. Players may hold more than one non-FIFA nationality.

No.	Pos.	Nation	Player
1	GK	BRA	Richard Costa (3rd captain)
2	DF	POR	Rafael Ramos
3	DF	BRA	Thalisson (on loan from Coritiba)
4	DF	BRA	Luizão
6	DF	BRA	Sávio
7	MF	BRA	Giovanni Pavani
8	MF	BRA	Matheus Araújo
9	FW	BRA	Wendel Silva (on loan from Santa Clara)
10	MF	ARG	Lucas Mugni
12	DF	BRA	Sanchez
13	DF	BRA	Luiz Otávio (captain)
16	FW	BRA	Rian Santana
18	DF	BRA	Júlio César
20	FW	URU	Nicolás Ferreira (on loan from Montevideo Wanderers)
22	GK	BRA	Matheus Nogueira (on loan from Paysandu)

No.	Pos.	Nation	Player
23	GK	BRA	Caíque França (on loan from Guarani)
25	MF	BRA	Vinicius Zanocelo (vice-captain)
26	MF	BRA	Richardson
29	MF	BRA	Vina
31	DF	BRA	Bryan Borges
33	DF	BRA	Éder
40	MF	BRA	Melk
63	DF	BRA	Pedro Gilmar
73	FW	BRA	Saulo Mineiro
77	FW	BRA	Lenny Lobato (on loan from Panetolikos)
81	MF	BRA	João Gabriel
90	FW	BRA	Kauã Ziegler
94	FW	URU	Renzo López
99	FW	BRA	Lucca

=== Youth team ===
Note: Flags indicate national team as defined under FIFA eligibility rules; some limited exceptions apply. Players may hold more than one non-FIFA nationality.

No.	Pos.	Nation	Player
19	DF	GHA	Stanley Boateng
41	GK	BRA	Gustavo Martins
44	DF	BRA	Kaiky
45	DF	BRA	Vini Uchella
46	DF	BRA	Arthur
51	DF	BRA	Samuel
60	FW	BRA	Enzo

No.	Pos.	Nation	Player
66	DF	BRA	Kaliel
71	DF	BRA	Gabriel Rocha
78	DF	BRA	Janderson
80	DF	BRA	Pedro Esli
83	GK	BRA	Mateus
86	DF	BRA	Aloísio
88	MF	BRA	Caio

=== Out on loan ===
Note: Flags indicate national team as defined under FIFA eligibility rules; some limited exceptions apply. Players may hold more than one non-FIFA nationality.

No.	Pos.	Nation	Player

== Staff ==
=== Current staff ===
As of 4 July 2025

Position	Name
Coaching staff
Head coach	(Brazil) Mozart
Assistant head coach	(Brazil) Anderson Batatais
Assistant head coach	(Brazil) Renatinho Negrão
Goalkeepers trainer	(Brazil) Everaldo Santana
Goalkeepers trainer	(Brazil) Marcos Paulo
Performance analyst	(Brazil) Alcino Rodrigues
Performance analyst	(Brazil) André Maranhão
Performance analyst	(Brazil) Renato Bennata
Medical staff
Fitness coach	(Brazil) Valdir Nogueira de Oliveira Júnior
Fitness coach	(Brazil) Eduardo Ballalai
Fitness coach	(Brazil) Roberto Farias
Doctor	(Brazil) Joaquim Garcia
Doctor	(Brazil) Leandro Rêgo
Doctor	(Brazil) Daniel Gomes
Doctor	(Brazil) Pedro Guilme
Physiotherapist	(Brazil) Adolfo Bernardo
Physiotherapist	(Brazil) Lucas Freire
Physiotherapist	(Brazil) Perez Maciel
Physiotherapist	(Brazil) Matheus Carneiro
Physiologist	(Brazil) Filipe Lourenço
Nutriotionists	(Brazil) Camila Mazetto
Nutritionists	(Brazil) Walter César
Nutritionists	(Brazil) Matheus Rodrigues
Dentist	(Brazil) Antônio Teixeira

== Managers ==
- (Brazil) Arnaldo Lira (1999)
- (Brazil) Lula Pereira (1999)
- (Uruguay) Sérgio Ramirez d'Ávila (1999)
- (Brazil) Celso Teixeira (1999–00)
- (Brazil) Cláudio Duarte (2000)
- (Brazil) José Carlos Serrão (2000)
- (Brazil) Arnaldo Lira (2000–01)
- (Brazil) Júlio Espinosa (2001)
- (Brazil) Flávio Araújo (2001)
- (Brazil) Artur Neto (2002)
- (Brazil) Luis Carlos Cruz (2002–03)
- (Brazil) Dimas Filgueiras (2003)
- (Brazil) Celso Teixeira (2003)
- (Brazil) Ricardo Barreto (2004)
- (Brazil) Roberto Fernandes (2004)
- (Brazil) Lula Pereira (2004)
- (Brazil) Arnaldo Lira (2005)
- (Brazil) Lula Pereira (2004)
- (Brazil) Jair Pereira (2005)
- (Brazil) Valdir Espinosa (2005)
- (Brazil) Zé Teodoro (2006), (2009)
- (Brazil) Paulo César Gusmão (2009–10)
- (Brazil) René Simões (2010)
- (Brazil) Estevam Soares (2010)
- (Brazil) Mário Sérgio (2010)
- (Brazil) Vágner Mancini (2011)
- (Brazil) Estevam Soares (2011)
- (Brazil) Paulo César Gusmão (2012)
- (Brazil) Ricardinho (2013)
- (Brazil) Sérgio Guedes (2013)
- (Brazil) Sérgio Soares (2013–14)
- (Brazil) Paulo César Gusmão (2014)
- (Brazil) Dado Cavalcanti (2015)
- (Brazil) Silas Pereira (2015)
- (Brazil) Geninho (2015)
- (Brazil) Marcelo Cabo (2015)
- (Brazil) Lisca (2015–16)
- (Brazil) Sérgio Soares (2016)
- (Brazil) Gilmar Dal Pozzo (2017)
- (Brazil) Givanildo Oliveira (2017)
- (Brazil) Marcelo Chamusca (2017–18)
- (Brazil) Jorginho (2018)
- (Brazil) Lisca (2018–19)
- (Brazil) Enderson Moreira (2019)
- (Brazil) Adílson Batista (2019)
- (Brazil) Argel Fuchs (2019–20)
- (Brazil) Enderson Moreira (2020)
- (Brazil) Guto Ferreira (2020–21)
- (Brazil) Tiago Nunes (2021–22)
- (Brazil) Dorival Júnior (2022)
- (Argentina) Lucho González (2022)
- (Paraguay) Gustavo Morínigo (2023)
- (Brazil) Eduardo Barroca (2023)
- (Brazil) Guto Ferreira (2023)
- (Brazil) Vagner Mancini (2023–2024)
- (Brazil) Léo Condé (2024–2025)
- (Brazil) Mozart (2026–present)

== Ultras groups ==
- Cearamor
- Movimento Organizado Força Independente (Mofi)
