= 2022 Campeonato Catarinense =

Campeonato Catarinense
- Season: 2022
- Dates: 22 January - 2 April
- Champions: Brusque (2nd title)
- Relegated: Juventus; Próspera
- Copa do Brasil: Brusque; Camboriú
- Série D: Camboriú; Concórdia; Hercílio Luz
- Matches: 80
- Goals: 167 (2.09 per match)
- Top goalscorer: Alex Sandro (10 goals)

The 2022 Campeonato Catarinense (officially the Catarinense Fort Atacadista 2022 for sponsorship reasons) was the 97th season of Santa Catarina's top-flight football league organized by FCF. The season began on 22 January and ended on 2 April 2022. Avaí were the defending champions but were eliminated in the quarter-finals.

The finals were played between Brusque and Camboriú. Tied 1–1 on aggregate, Brusque won their second title due to having a better performance in the first stage.

== Format ==
The tournament was contested between 12 teams, who first played in a single round-robin tournament. In the first stage, the bottom two teams were relegated to next year's Série B. The final stage was played on a home-and-away two-legged basis. Champions and runners-up qualified for the 2023 Copa do Brasil, while three teams qualified for the 2023 Campeonato Brasileiro Série D.

== Participating teams ==
Club	Home city	Manager	2021 result	Titles (last)
Avaí	Florianópolis	Eduardo Barroca	1st	18 (2021)
Barra	Balneário Camboriú	Matheus Costa	1st (Série B)	0
Brusque	Brusque	Waguinho Dias	3rd	1 (1992)
Camboriú	Camboriú	Luan Carlos	2nd (Série B)	0
Chapecoense	Chapecó	Bolívar	2nd	7 (2020)
Concórdia	Concórdia	Itamar Schülle	9th	0
Figueirense	Florianópolis	Júnior Rocha	7th	18 (2018)
Hercílio Luz	Tubarão	Raul Cabral	10th	2 (1958)
Joinville	Joinville	Gilmar Dal Pozzo	8th	12 (2001)
Juventus	Jaraguá do Sul	Alemão	5th	0
Marcílio Dias	Itajaí	Fernando Tonet	4th	1 (1963)
Próspera	Criciúma	Emerson Cris	6th	0

== First stage ==
=== Table and Results ===
Pos	Team	Pld	W	D	L	GF	GA	GD	Pts	Qualification or relegation	BRU	HER	CAM	CON	CHA	MCD	FIG	AVA	JEC	BAR	PRO	JUV
1	Brusque	11	7	3	1	20	11	+9	24	Advance to Final stage			0–0			3–2	2–2	1–0		3–1	1–0	
2	Hercílio Luz	11	6	3	2	13	7	+6	21	Advance to Final stage	3–2		1–0		3–0		4–1					1–0
3	Camboriú	11	6	3	2	11	6	+5	21	Advance to Final stage				3–1		2–1		1–0	1–0		1–0	
4	Concórdia	11	6	2	3	13	8	+5	20	Advance to Final stage	0–0	0–0			0–1		1–0					2–1
5	Chapecoense	11	5	1	5	10	13	−3	16	Advance to Final stage	1–3		1–1			1–2	1–0			1–0		2–0
6	Marcílio Dias	11	4	3	4	19	15	+4	15	Advance to Final stage		0–0		0–2				0–0	3–0	4–2	3–0	
7	Figueirense	11	4	3	4	15	14	+1	15	Advance to Final stage			2–1			3–2		4–1	0–0		1–2	
8	Avaí	11	3	3	5	8	9	−1	12	Advance to Final stage		3–0		2–1	0–1				0–0	2–0	0–1	
9	Joinville	11	2	5	4	9	15	−6	11		1–3	0–0		1–3	2–1							1–1
10	Barra	11	3	1	7	12	14	−2	10			1–0	0–1	0–1			0–0		1–2			
11	Próspera (R)	11	3	1	7	8	15	−7	10	Relegation to the Série B		0–1		0–2	2–0				2–2	0–2		1–2
12	Juventus (R)	11	1	4	6	7	18	−11	7	Relegation to the Série B	1–2		0–0			2–2	0–2	0–0		0–5		

Source: FCF
Rules for classification: 1) Points; 2) Wins; 3) Goal difference; 4) Goals scored; 5) Head-to-head result (only in a two-way tie); 6) Fewest red cards; 7) Fewest yellow cards; 8) Draw.
(R) Relegated

== Final stage ==
Starting from the quarter-finals, the teams played a single-elimination tournament. The matches were played on a home-and-away two-legged basis, with the higher-seeded team hosting the second leg. If tied on aggregate, the higher-seeded team would qualified.

=== Bracket ===
Quarter-finals
7	Figueirense	1	0	1
2	Hercílio Luz	0	0	0
6	Marcílio Dias	1	2	3
3	Camboriú	1	3	4
5	Chapecoense	1	1	2
4	Concórdia	1	1	2
8	Avaí	1	0	1
1	Brusque	1	0	1

Semi-finals
7	Figueirense	1	0	1
3	Camboriú	1	2	3
4	Concórdia	0	0	0
1	Brusque	1	1	2

Finals
3	Camboriú	1	0	1
1	Brusque	1	0	1

=== Quarter-finals ===
Team 1	Agg.	Team 2	1st leg	2nd leg
Avaí	1–1	Brusque	1–1	0–0
Figueirense	1–0	Hercílio Luz	1–0	0–0
Marcílio Dias	3–4	Camboriú	1–1	2–3
Chapecoense	2–2	Concórdia	1–1	1–1

==== Group A ====
13 March 2022
18:30

Avaí	1–1	Brusque
Copete 32'	Report	Fernandinho 6'

Estádio da Ressacada, Florianópolis
Attendance: 4,199
Referee: Luiz Augusto Silveira Tisne

19 March 2022
16:30

Brusque	0–0	Avaí
	Report

Estádio Augusto Bauer, Brusque
Attendance: 3,601
Referee: Héber Lopes

Brusque qualified for the semi-finals due to having a better campaign.

==== Group B ====
12 March 2022
16:30

Figueirense	1–0	Hercílio Luz
Andrew 7'	Report

Estádio Orlando Scarpelli, Florianópolis
Attendance: 3,129
Referee: Héber Lopes

20 March 2022
11:00

Hercílio Luz	0–0	Figueirense
	Report

Estádio Aníbal Torres Costa, Tubarão
Attendance: 3,904
Referee: Ramon Abatti Abel

Figueirense qualified for the semi-finals.

==== Group C ====
12 March 2022
19:00

Marcílio Dias	1–1	Camboriú
Zé Vitor 43' (pen.)	Report	Tetê 10'

Estádio Hercílio Luz, Itajaí
Attendance: 3,135
Referee: Rafael Traci

19 March 2022
19:00

Camboriú	3–2	Marcílio Dias
Maicon Assis 6'; Bruno Mota 43'; Emerson Martins 47'	Report	Rômulo 64'; PH 75'

Estádio das Nações, Balneário Camboriú
Attendance: 1,919
Referee: Bráulio da Silva Machado

Camboriú qualified for the semi-finals.

==== Group D ====
13 March 2022
16:00

Chapecoense	1–1	Concórdia
Tiago Real 25'	Report	Vinicius Moura 10'

Arena Condá, Chapecó
Attendance: 2,932
Referee: Rodrigo D'Alonso Ferreira

20 March 2022
16:00

Concórdia	1–1	Chapecoense
Ruy 83'	Report	Rodriguinho 65'

Estádio Domingos Machado de Lima, Concórdia
Attendance: 3,548
Referee: Rodrigo D'Alonso Ferreira

Concórdia qualified for the semi-finals due to having a better campaign.

=== Semi-finals ===
Team 1	Agg.	Team 2	1st leg	2nd leg
Concórdia	0–2	Brusque	0–1	0–1
Figueirense	1–3	Camboriú	1–1	0–2

==== Group E ====
23 March 2022
20:30

Concórdia	0–1	Brusque
	Report	Oliveira 31' (o.g.)

Estádio Domingos Machado de Lima, Concórdia
Attendance: 1,771
Referee: Ramon Abatti Abel

27 March 2022
16:00

Brusque	1–0	Concórdia
Alex Sandro 89'	Report

Estádio Augusto Bauer, Brusque
Attendance: 4,118
Referee: Héber Lopes

Brusque qualified for the finals.

==== Group F ====
23 March 2022
20:30

Figueirense	1–1	Camboriú
Gustavo Henrique 48'	Report	Wesley 63'

Estádio Orlando Scarpelli, Florianópolis
Attendance: 7,323
Referee: Luiz Augusto Silveira Tisne

26 March 2022
16:30

Camboriú	2–0	Figueirense
Wesley 53'; Matheus Lagoa 84'	Report

Estádio das Nações, Balneário Camboriú
Attendance: 3,334
Referee: Ramon Abatti Abel

Camboriú qualified for the finals.

=== Finals ===
Team 1	Agg.	Team 2	1st leg	2nd leg
Camboriú	1–1	Brusque	1–1	0–0

==== Group G ====
30 March 2022
20:30

Camboriú	1–1	Brusque
Juliano 1'	Report	Fernandinho 62'

Estádio das Nações, Balneário Camboriú
Attendance: 3,968
Referee: Bráulio da Silva Machado

Camboriú	Brusque

GK	12	(Brazil) Gabriel Félix (c)	(yellow card) 90'
DF	2	(Brazil) Lucas Barboza
DF	25	(Brazil) Tetê
DF	3	(Brazil) Wesley	(yellow card) 88' (yellow-red card) 90+4'
DF	6	(Brazil) Léo Campos
MF	5	(Brazil) Emerson Martins		(substituted off) 90+4'
MF	8	(Brazil) Balotelli
MF	23	(Brazil) Jorge Henrique		(substituted off) 75'
MF	10	(Brazil) Maicon Assis		(substituted off) 75'
FW	9	(Brazil) Bruno Mota		(substituted off) 90+4'
FW	11	(Brazil) Juliano	(yellow card) 56'	(substituted off) 60'
Substitutes:
GK	1	(Brazil) Léo Lopes
GK	22	(Brazil) Igor Pavan
DF	13	(Brazil) Neguete		(substituted on) 90+4'
DF	16	(Brazil) Charles
DF	18	(Brazil) Bruno Oliveira		(substituted on) 90+4'
DF	20	(Brazil) Vivico		(substituted on) 60'
MF	14	(Brazil) Kekeu
MF	15	(Brazil) Caio Acaraú
FW	7	(Brazil) Matheus Lagoa		(substituted on) 75'
FW	17	(Brazil) Ronny		(substituted on) 75'
FW	19	(Brazil) Geovane Itinga	(yellow card) 80'
FW	21	(Brazil) Jefferson Maranhão
Coach:
(Brazil) Luan Carlos

GK	21	(Brazil) Ruan Carneiro
DF	2	(Brazil) Toty	(yellow card) 55'
DF	3	(Brazil) Éverton Alemão	(yellow card) 64'
DF	4	(Brazil) Sandro
DF	6	(Brazil) Airton
MF	5	(Brazil) Rodolfo Potiguar (c)	(yellow card) 90+2'
MF	8	(Brazil) Zé Mateus
MF	88	(Brazil) Luiz Antônio		(substituted off) 63'
MF	10	(Brazil) Diego Jardel		(substituted off) 63'
FW	11	(Brazil) Fernandinho	(yellow card) 45+1'	(substituted off) 63'
FW	9	(Brazil) Alex Sandro	(yellow card) 42'	(substituted off) 84'
Substitutes:
GK	12	(Brazil) Allan	(yellow card) 63'
DF	22	(Brazil) Edílson		(substituted on) 84'
DF	40	(Brazil) Rafael
DF	66	(Brazil) Alex Ruan
MF	14	(Brazil) Jailson		(substituted on) 63'
FW	7	(Brazil) Bruno Santos		(substituted on) 63'
FW	17	(Brazil) Diego Mathias
FW	19	(Brazil) Lucas Silva		(substituted on) 63'
FW	20	(Brazil) Marco Antônio
FW	77	(Brazil) Pedoca
Coach:
(Brazil) Waguinho Dias

Assistant referees:
Alex dos Santos
Fabiano Coelho da Silva
Fourth official:
Júlio César Pfleger
Fifth official:
Johnny Barros de Oliveira

2 April 2022
16:30

Brusque	0–0	Camboriú
	Report

Estádio Augusto Bauer, Brusque
Attendance: 4,943
Referee: Ramon Abatti Abel

Brusque	Camboriú

GK	21	(Brazil) Ruan Carneiro
DF	2	(Brazil) Toty
DF	3	(Brazil) Éverton Alemão	(yellow card) 48'
DF	4	(Brazil) Sandro (c)
DF	6	(Brazil) Airton	(yellow card) 88'
MF	55	(Brazil) Matheus Trindade		(substituted off) 67'
MF	8	(Brazil) Zé Mateus
MF	88	(Brazil) Luiz Antônio
MF	10	(Brazil) Diego Jardel		(substituted off) 61'
FW	11	(Brazil) Fernandinho		(substituted off) 82'
FW	9	(Brazil) Alex Sandro	(yellow card) 70'
Substitutes:
GK	12	(Brazil) Allan
DF	22	(Brazil) Edílson
DF	40	(Brazil) Rafael
DF	66	(Brazil) Alex Ruan
MF	14	(Brazil) Jailson		(substituted on) 61'
FW	7	(Brazil) Bruno Santos		(substituted on) 82'
FW	17	(Brazil) Diego Mathias
FW	19	(Brazil) Lucas Silva		(substituted on) 67'
FW	20	(Brazil) Marco Antônio
FW	77	(Brazil) Pedoca
Coach:
(Brazil) Waguinho Dias

GK	12	(Brazil) Gabriel Félix (c)
DF	2	(Brazil) Lucas Barboza
DF	25	(Brazil) Tetê
DF	15	(Brazil) Caio Acaraú	(yellow card) 42'	(substituted off) 86'
DF	6	(Brazil) Léo Campos
MF	5	(Brazil) Emerson Martins	(yellow card) 80'	(substituted off) 86'
MF	8	(Brazil) Balotelli		(substituted off) 86'
MF	23	(Brazil) Jorge Henrique		(substituted off) 59'
FW	10	(Brazil) Maicon Assis	(yellow card) 21'	(substituted off) 74'
FW	11	(Brazil) Juliano	(yellow card) 90+3'
FW	9	(Brazil) Bruno Mota
Substitutes:
GK	1	(Brazil) Léo Lopes
GK	22	(Brazil) Igor Pavan
DF	4	(Brazil) Neguete
DF	16	(Brazil) Charles
DF	18	(Brazil) Bruno Oliveira		(substituted on) 86'
DF	20	(Brazil) Vivico
MF	14	(Brazil) Kekeu
FW	7	(Brazil) Matheus Lagoa	(red card) 90+4'	(substituted on) 74'
FW	13	(Brazil) Léo Mineiro
FW	17	(Brazil) Ronny		(substituted on) 59'
FW	19	(Brazil) Geovane Itinga		(substituted on) 86'
FW	21	(Brazil) Jefferson Maranhão		(substituted on) 86'
Coach:
(Brazil) Luan Carlos

Assistant referees:
Thiaggo Americano Labes
Bruno Muller
Fourth official:
Adriano Roberto de Souza
Fifth official:
José Roberto Larroyd

== Overall table ==
Pos	Team	Pld	W	D	L	GF	GA	GD	Pts	Qualification or relegation
1	Brusque	17	9	7	1	24	13	+11	34	Champions and 2023 Copa do Brasil
2	Camboriú	17	8	7	2	19	11	+8	31	Runners-up, 2023 Copa do Brasil and 2023 Série D
3	Concórdia	15	6	4	5	15	12	+3	22	2023 Série D
4	Figueirense	15	5	5	5	17	17	0	20	
5	Hercílio Luz	13	6	4	3	13	8	+5	22	2023 Série D
6	Chapecoense (Note: Chapecoense and Avaí qualified for the Copa do Brasil via CBF ranking.)	13	5	3	5	12	15	−3	18	2023 Copa do Brasil
7	Marcílio Dias (Note: Marcílio Dias qualified for the Copa do Brasil by winning the 2022 Copa Santa Catarina.)	13	4	4	5	22	19	+3	16	2023 Copa do Brasil
8	Avaí	13	3	5	5	9	10	−1	14	2023 Copa do Brasil
9	Joinville	11	2	5	4	9	15	−6	11	
10	Barra	11	3	1	7	12	14	−2	10	
11	Próspera	11	3	1	7	8	15	−7	10	Relegation to 2023 Catarinense Série B
12	Juventus	11	1	4	6	7	18	−11	7	Relegation to 2023 Catarinense Série B

Source: FCF

== Top goalscorers ==
Rank	Player	Team	Goals
1	Alex Sandro	Brusque	10
2	Zé Vitor	Marcílio Dias	9
3	Bruno Mota	Camboriú	6
4	Fernandinho	Brusque	5
5	Diego Jardel	Brusque	4
5	Perotti	Chapecoense	4
