= 2025 Ceará Sporting Club season =

Ceará Sporting Club
2025 season
- Manager: Léo Condé
- Stadium: Castelão
- Série A: 17th
- Campeonato Cearense: Champions (47th title)
- Copa do Brasil: Third Round
- Copa do Nordeste: Semi-finals
- Average home league attendance: 34,798
Home colours	Away colours

The 2025 season was Ceará Sporting Club's 112th overall and 1st season in Brazil's top division. The club also competed in the Campeonato Cearense, Copa do Brasil, and Copa do Nordeste.

== Squad ==
=== Players ===
As of 21 March 2025

Note: Flags indicate national team as defined under FIFA eligibility rules; some limited exceptions apply. Players may hold more than one non-FIFA nationality.

No.	Pos.	Nation	Player
1	GK	BRA	Richard
2	DF	POR	Rafael Ramos
3	DF	BRA	Marllon
7	FW	BRA	Pedro Henrique
8	MF	BRA	Matheus Araújo
9	FW	BRA	Pedro Raul (on loan from Corinthians)
10	MF	ARG	Lucas Mugni
11	FW	BRA	Aylon
13	DF	BRA	Luiz Otávio (captain)
15	DF	BRA	Gabriel Lacerda
16	GK	BRA	Fernando Miguel
17	FW	BRA	João Victor
18	GK	BRA	Keiller (on loan from Internacional)
19	MF	BRA	Rômulo (on loan from Palmeiras)
20	DF	BRA	Dieguinho
21	FW	BRA	Lelê (on loan from Fluminense)
22	FW	ARG	Alejandro Martínez (on loan from Talleres)

No.	Pos.	Nation	Player
23	DF	BRA	Willian Machado
26	MF	BRA	Richardson
27	FW	PAR	Antonio Galeano (on loan from Nacional)
28	MF	PAR	Jorge Recalde
29	DF	BRA	Bruno Tubarão
30	DF	BRA	Nicolas (on loan from América Mineiro)
31	MF	BRA	Lucas Lima
33	DF	BRA	Éder
40	DF	BRA	Ramon Menezes
44	DF	BRA	Marcos Victor (on loan from Bahia)
70	DF	BRA	Fabiano (on loan from Moreirense)
77	FW	BRA	Fernandinho
79	DF	BRA	Matheus Bahia (on loan from Bahia)
88	MF	BRA	Fernando Sobral (on loan from Cuiabá)
94	GK	BRA	Bruno Ferreira
97	MF	BRA	Lourenço

=== Transfers In ===
Pos.	Player	Transferred from	Fee	Date	Source
MF	(Brazil) Bruno Tubarão	(Brazil) Atlético Goianiense	Free	1 January 2025	
FW	(Brazil) Pedro Henrique	(Brazil) Corinthians	Undisclosed	10 January 2025	
FW	(Brazil) Lucas Rian	(Japan) Matsumoto Yamaga	$200,000	16 January 2025	
MF	(Brazil) Rômulo	(Brazil) Palmeiras	Loan	7 February 2025	
FW	(Brazil) Lelê	(Brazil) Fluminense	Loan	27 March 2025	
MF	(Brazil) Vina	(Saudi Arabia) Al-Jubail	Undisclosed	31 July 2025	
FW	(Brazil) Rodriguinho	(Brazil) Cruzeiro	Loan	13 August 2025	

=== Transfers Out ===
Pos.	Player	Transferred to	Fee	Date	Source
FW	(Brazil) Pedrinho	(South Korea) Seoul E-Land FC	Contract terminated	7 January 2025	
FW	(Brazil) Lucas Rian	(Brazil) São Bernardo	Loan	16 January 2025	
MF	(Brazil) Guilherme Castilho	(Mexico) Juárez	US$1,500,000	11 February 2025	
FW	(Brazil) Lelê	(Brazil) Fluminense	Loan return	9 June 2025	
MF	(Paraguay) Jorge Recalde	(Paraguay) Libertad	Contract terminated	4 July 2025	
FW	(Brazil) João Victor	(Hungary) Zalaegerszeg	€200,000	17 July 2025	
MF	(Brazil) Bruno Tubarão	(Indonesia) Persija Jakarta	Undisclosed	19 August 2025	

== Competitions ==
=== Overall record ===
Competition	First match	Last match	Starting round	Final position	Record							
Competition	First match	Last match	Starting round	Final position	Pld	W	D	L	GF	GA	GD	Win %
Série A	29 March 2025	21 December 2025	Matchday 1	17th	38	11	10	17	34	40	−6	28.95
Campeonato Cearense	18 January 2025	12 March 2025	Matchday 1	Winners	9	8	1	0	21	4	+17	88.89
Copa do Brasil	19 February 2025	22 May 2025	First round	Third Round	4	1	1	2	4	6	−2	25.00
Copa do Nordeste	22 January 2025	20 August 2025	Group stage	Semi-Final	9	4	2	3	9	7	+2	44.44
Total					60	24	14	22	68	57	+11	40.00

Source: Competitions

=== Série A ===
==== League table ====
Pos	Team	Pld	W	D	L	GF	GA	GD	Pts	Qualification or relegation
15	Vitória	38	11	12	15	35	52	−17	45	
16	Internacional	38	11	11	16	44	57	−13	44	
17	Ceará (R)	38	11	10	17	34	40	−6	43	Relegation to Campeonato Brasileiro Série B
18	Fortaleza (R)	38	11	10	17	44	58	−14	43	Relegation to Campeonato Brasileiro Série B
19	Juventude (R)	38	9	8	21	35	69	−34	35	Relegation to Campeonato Brasileiro Série B

Source: CBF
Rules for classification: 1) points; 2) wins; 3) goal difference; 4) goals scored; 5) head-to-head results (only between two teams); 6) fewest red cards; 7) fewest yellow cards; 8) drawing of lots.
(R) Relegated

Round	1	2	3	4	5	6	7	8	9	10	11	12	13	14	15	16	17	18	19	20	21	22	23	24	25	26	27	28	29	30	31	32	33	34	35	36	37	38
Ground	A	H	A	H	A	H	H	A	H	A	H	A	A	H	A	H	A	H	A	H	A	H	A	H	A	A	H	A	H	A	H	H	A	H	A	H	A	H
Result	D	W	L	W	L	D	W	D	W	L	L	L	W	L	L	L	W	D	L	W	D	L	D	D	W	L	W	D	L	L	W	D	W	L	L	D	L	L
Position	6	3	8	4	5	9	7	6	5	7	10	12	10	12	12	14	11	11	13	11	11	12	12	14	12	12	10	12	13	14	12	13	12	14	14	15	15	17
Points	1	4	4	7	7	8	11	12	15	15	15	15	18	18	18	18	21	22	22	25	26	26	27	28	31	31	34	35	35	35	38	39	42	42	42	43	43	43

A = Away; H = Home; W = Win; D = Draw; L = Loss

==== Matches ====
31 March 2025 1	Red Bull Bragantino	2–2	Ceará	Bragança Paulista
20:00 UTC−3	Laquintana 45+1'; Ramires 90+3'	Report	Pedro Raul 12'; Marllon 23'	Stadium: Estádio Nabi Abi Chedid; Attendance: 2,516; Referee: Bruno Pereira Vasconcelos

5 April 2025 2	Ceará	2–0	Grêmio	Fortaleza
18:30 UTC−3	Pedro Raul 26' (pen.); Matheus Araújo 90+5'	Report		Stadium: Castelão

12 April 2025 3	Juventude	2–1	Ceará	Caxias do Sul
17:00 UTC−3	Mandaca 45+1'; Matheus Babi 68'	Report	Aylon 44'	Stadium: Estádio Alfredo Jaconi

15 April 2025 4	Ceará	2–1	Vasco da Gama	Fortaleza
18:30 UTC−3	Pedro Raul 29', 81'	Report	Vegetti 90+2'	Stadium: Castelão

21 April 2025 5	Bahia	1–0	Ceará	Salvador
20:00 (UTC-3)	Éverton Ribeiro 90+14' (pen.)	Report		Stadium: Arena Fonte Nova

26 April 2025 6	Ceará	1–1	São Paulo	Fortaleza
18:30 UTC−3	Pedro Henrique 4'	Report	Ryan Francisco 44'	Stadium: Castelão; Attendance: 46,929; Referee: Anderson Daronco

3 May 2025 7	Ceará	1–0	Vitória	Fortaleza
18:30 UTC−3	Marllon 56'	Report		Stadium: Castelão

12 May 2025 8	Santos	0–0	Ceará	São Paulo
20:00 UTC−3	Rincón (yellow card) 39'	Report	Lucas Mugni (yellow card) 58'; Fernando Sobral (yellow card) 66'	Stadium: Allianz Parque; Attendance: 35,240; Referee: Felipe Fernandes de Lima

17 May 2025 9	Ceará	2–0	Sport	Fortaleza
(UTC-3)	Mugni 9'; Galeano 61'	Report		Stadium: Castelão

1 June 2025 11	Ceará	0–1	Atlético Mineiro	Fortaleza
18:30 UTC−3		Report	Rony 78'	Stadium: Castelão; Attendance: 50,070; Referee: Alex Gomes Stefano

4 June 2025 10	Botafogo	3–2	Ceará	Rio de Janeiro
20:00 UTC-03:00	Mastriani 45'; Alex Telles 72' (pen.); Marlon Freitas 87'	Report	Pedro Raul 57', 87'	Stadium: Nilton Santos; Referee: Edina Alves Batista
Note: The match, originally scheduled for 24 May, was postponed owing to security concerns.

13 July 2025 13	Fortaleza	0–1	Ceará	Fortaleza
20:30 (UTC-3)		Report	Galeano 57'	Stadium: Castelão

16 July 2025 14	Ceará	0–1	Corinthians	Fortaleza
19:30 UTC−3		Report	Talles Magno 71'	Stadium: Castelão; Referee: Paulo Cesar Zanovelli

20 July 2025 15	Internacional	1–0	Ceará	Porto Alegre
11:00	Alan Patrick 23'	Report		Stadium: Beira-Rio; Attendance: 31,976; Referee: Davi de Oliveira Lacerda

23 July 2025 16	Ceará	0–2	Mirassol	Fortaleza
19:00 UTC−3		Report	Chico 16'; Negueba 22'	Stadium: Castelão; Referee: Lucas Casagrande

27 July 2025 17	Cruzeiro	1–2	Ceará	Belo Horizonte
16:00 UTC−3	Kaio Jorge 4'	Report	Galeano 39', 60'	Stadium: Mineirão; Attendance: 52,802; Referee: Raphael Claus

3 August 2025 18	Ceará	1–1	Flamengo	Fortaleza
18:30 UTC−3	Pedro Raul 67'	Report	de Arrascaeta 37'	Stadium: Castelão; Attendance: 57,867; Referee: Rodrigo José Pereira de Lima

10 August 2025 19	Palmeiras	2–1	Ceará	São Paulo
17:00 UTC−3	López 67' (pen.); Vitor Roque 69'	Report	Lourenço 51'	Stadium: Allianz Parque; Attendance: 27,358; Referee: Lucas Paulo Torezin

16 August 2025 20	Ceará	1–0	Red Bull Bragantino	Fortaleza
16:00 UTC−3	Aylon 14'	Report		Stadium: Castelão

23 August 2025 21	Grêmio	0–0	Ceará	Porto Alegre
21:00 UTC−3		Report		Stadium: Arena do Grêmio

30 August 2025 22	Ceará	0–1	Juventude
16:00

14 September 2025 23	Vasco da Gama	2–2	Ceará
20:30

20 September 2025 24	Ceará	1–1	Bahia
18:30

29 September 2025 25	São Paulo	0–1	Ceará
20:00

2 October 2025 26	Vitória	1–0	Ceará
19:00

5 October 2025 27	Ceará	3–0	Santos
20:30

15 October 2025 28	Sport	1–1	Ceará
20:00

19 October 2025 29	Ceará	0–2	Botafogo
18:30

25 October 2025 30	Atlético Mineiro	1–0	Ceará
16:00

2 November 2025 31	Ceará	2–0	Fluminense
16:00

6 November 2025 32	Ceará	1–1	Fortaleza
20:00

9 November 2025 33	Corinthians	0–1	Ceará
16:00

20 November 2025 34	Ceará	1–2	Internacional
21:30

24 November 2025 35	Mirassol	3–0	Ceará
19:00

29 November 2025 36	Ceará	1–1	Cruzeiro
21:00

3 December 2025 37	Flamengo	1–0	Ceará
21:30

7 December 2025 38	Ceará	1–3	Palmeiras
16:00

=== Campeonato Cearense ===
==== Results by round ====
Round	1	2	3	4	5
Ground	H	A	H	H	A
Result	W	W	W	W	W
Position	2	1	1	1	1

Updated to match(es) played on 18 January 2025. Source:
A = Away; H = Home; W = Win; D = Draw; L = Loss

==== First Phase ====
18 January 2025 1	Ceará	2–1	Tirol	Fortaleza
16:30 UTC−3	Pedro Henrique 7'; Ramon 35'		Soares 63'	Stadium: Estádio Presidente Vargas; Attendance: 14,269; Referee: Elizabete Esmeralda Cordeiro dos Santos Gomes

26 January 2025 2	Ferroviário	1–2	Ceará	Fortaleza
17:00 (UTC-3)	Dieguinho 36' (o.g.)		Lourenço 11'; Fernandinho 15'	Stadium: Domingão; Attendance: 6,005; Referee: Marcelo de Lima Henrique

29 January 2025 3	Ceará	1–0	Iguatu	Fortaleza
20:30 UTC−3	Fernandinho 26'			Stadium: Estádio Presidente Vargas; Attendance: 8,713; Referee: Marcelo de Lima Henrique

2 February 2025 4	Ceará	5–0	Barbalha	Fortaleza
17:00 UTC−3	Pedro Henrique 15'; Aylon 54', 90+3'; Guilherme Luiz 89'; Matheus Araújo 90+5'			Stadium: Estádio Presidente Vargas; Attendance: 9,443; Referee: Léo Simão Holanda

8 February 2025 5	Fortaleza	1–2	Ceará	Fortaleza
16:30 (UTC-3)	Lucero 73'	Report	Mugni 16'; Pedro Henrique 25'	Stadium: Castelão; Attendance: 42,464; Referee: Matheus Delgado Candançan

==== Semi-finals ====
2 March 2025 First Leg	Maracanã	0–3	Ceará	Fortaleza
17:00 UTC−3			Marllon 35'; Mugni 46'; Pedro Raul 90+3' (pen.)	Stadium: Castelão; Attendance: 6,776; Referee: Joanilson Scarcella de Lima

9 March 2025 Second Leg	Ceará	4–0 (7–0 agg.)	Maracanã	Fortaleza
17:00 (UTC-3)	Pedro Raul 18'; Marcos Victor 24'; Fernandinho 44'; Matheus Araújo 61'			Stadium: Estádio Presidente Vargas; Attendance: 13,385; Referee: Léo Simão Holanda

==== Finals ====
15 March 2025 First Leg	Fortaleza	0–1	Ceará	Fortaleza
16:30 (UTC-3)		Report	Sobral 82'	Stadium: Castelão; Attendance: 35,928; Referee: Rodrigo José Pereira de Lima

22 March 2025 Second Leg	Ceará	1–1 (2–1 agg.)	Fortaleza	Fortaleza
16:30 (UTC-3)	Pedro Raul 72'		Lucas Sasha 59'	Stadium: Castelão

=== Copa do Brasil ===
19 February 2025 First round	Sergipe	0–2	Ceará	Aracaju
20:00		Report	Pedro Henrique 16' (pen.); Diego 61'	Stadium: Batistão; Attendance: 0 (closed doors); Referee: Felipe Fernandes de Lima (Minas Gerais)

12 March 2025 Second round	Ceará	2–2 (3–0 p)	Confiança	Fortaleza
21:30	Pedro Raul 73'; Galeano 84'	Report	Ronald 9'; Fábio 35'	Stadium: Castelão; Attendance: 11,996; Referee: Davi de Oliveira Lacerda (Espírito Santo)
	Penalties
	Fernando Sobral (penalty scored); Galeano (penalty scored); Rômulo (penalty scored)		(penalty missed) Fábio; (penalty missed) Airton; (penalty missed) André

==== Third round ====
The draw was held on 9 April 2025.

30 April 2025 First leg	Ceará	0–1	Palmeiras	Fortaleza
19:30 UTC−3		Report	Gómez 34'	Stadium: Castelão; Attendance: 44,079; Referee: Rodrigo José Pereira de Lima

22 May 2025 Second leg	Palmeiras	3–0 (4–0 agg.)	Ceará	São Paulo
19:30 UTC−3	Estêvão 67', 69'; López 86'	Report		Stadium: Allianz Parque; Referee: Anderson Daronco

=== Copa do Nordeste ===
==== Group stage ====
Pos	Team	Pld	W	D	L	GF	GA	GD	Pts	Qualification
1	Bahia	7	5	1	1	17	7	+10	16	Advance to Quarter-finals
2	(Alagoas) CSA	7	4	1	2	14	7	+7	13	Advance to Quarter-finals
3	Ceará	7	4	1	2	9	6	+3	13	Advance to Quarter-finals
4	(Sergipe) Confiança	7	3	2	2	8	5	+3	11	Advance to Quarter-finals
5	(Pernambuco) Náutico	7	2	2	3	5	9	−4	8	

Source: CBF

22 January 2025 1	Náutico	1–0	Ceará	Recife
21:30 UTC−3	Paulo Sérgio 57'	Report		Stadium: Estádio dos Aflitos; Attendance: 4,392; Referee: Emerson Souza Silva

5 February 2025 2	Ceará	1–0	CSA	Fortaleza
21:30 UTC−3	Diego 84'			Stadium: Estádio Presidente Vargas; Attendance: 9,187; Referee: José Magno Teixeira do Nascimento

12 February 2025 3	Ceará	1–1	Confiança	Fortaleza
19:00 UTC−3	Aylon 54'		Luiz Otávio 45+2'	Stadium: Castelão; Attendance: 14,590; Referee: Wiomar Santana de Oliveira

6 March 2025 5	Ceará	1–0	América de Natal	Fortaleza
19:00 UTC−3	Pedro Raul 27'			Stadium: Estádio Presidente Vargas; Attendance: 10,765; Referee: Bruno Pereira Vasconcelos

19 March 2025 6	Ceará	2–0	Juazeirense	Fortaleza
19:00 UTC−3	Galeano 51', 83'			Stadium: Castelão; Attendance: 11,591; Referee: Paulo José de Souza Mourão

26 March 2025 4	Bahia	3–2	Ceará	Salvador
21:30 UTC−3	Rodríguez 29'; Erick 46', 64'		Fernandinho 66'; Galeano 83'	Stadium: Arena Fonte Nova; Attendance: 29,119; Referee: Afro Rocha de Carvalho Filho

7 June 2025 7	Sampaio Corrêa	1–2	Ceará	São Luís
21:30	Alan Stence 50'		Pedro Raul 77' (pen.); Galeano 83'	Stadium: Castelão; Attendance: 1,494; Referee: Tarcisío Flores da Silva

==== Final stages ====
9 July 2025 Quarter-finals	Sport	0–0 (2–4 p)	Ceará	Recife
21:30		Report		Stadium: Estádio Ilha do Retiro; Referee: Afro Rocha de Carvalho Filho
	Penalties
	Rivera (penalty missed); Lucas Lima (penalty missed); Atencio (penalty scored); Rafael Thyere (penalty scored)		(penalty scored) Pedro Raul; (penalty scored) Fernando Sobral; (penalty scored) Lourenço; (penalty missed) Matheus Araújo; (penalty scored) Matheus Bahia

20 August 2025 Semi-finals	Bahia	1–0	Ceará	Salvador
21:30	Tiago 90+3'	Report		Stadium: Arena Fonte Nova; Referee: Afro Rocha de Carvalho Filho
