= 2022 Campeonato Baiano =

Campeonato Baiano
- Season: 2022
- Dates: 15 January – 10 April
- Champions: Atlético de Alagoinhas (2nd title)
- Relegated: UNIRB; Vitória da Conquista
- Copa do Brasil: Atlético de Alagoinhas; Bahia de Feira; Jacuipense; Bahia (via RNC); Vitória (via RNC)
- Série D: Atlético de Alagoinhas; Bahia de Feira; Jacuipense
- Copa do Nordeste: Atlético de Alagoinhas; Bahia (via RNC)
- Copa do Nordeste qualification: Jacuipense; Vitória (via RNC)
- Matches: 51
- Goals: 110 (2.16 per match)
- Top goalscorer: Miller (6 goals)

The 2022 Campeonato Baiano (officially the Campeonato Baiano de Futebol Profissional Série “A” – Edição 2022) was the 118th edition of Bahia's top professional football league organized by FBF. The competition began on 15 January and ended on 10 April 2022.

This was the first season in history without a team from Salvador ranked in the top four of the tournament.

The defending champions Atlético de Alagoinhas defeated Jacuipense 3–1 on aggregate obtaining their second title. As champions, Atlético de Alagoinhas qualified for the 2023 Copa do Brasil and the 2023 Copa do Nordeste.

== Format ==
In the first stage, each team played the other nine teams in a single round-robin tournament. Top four teams advanced to the semi-finals. The bottom two teams were relegated to the 2023 Campeonato Baiano Série B.

The final stage was played on a home-and-away two-legged basis with the best overall performance team hosting the second leg. If tied on aggregate, the penalty shoot-out would be used to determine the winners.

Champions qualified for the 2023 Copa do Brasil and 2023 Copa do Nordeste, while runners-up and third place qualified for the 2023 Copa do Brasil. Top two teams not already qualified for 2023 Série A, Série B or Série C qualified for 2023 Campeonato Brasileiro Série D. As the 2022 Copa Governador was not held, the third Série D berth was awarded via Campeonato Baiano.

== Teams ==
Club	Home city	Manager	2021 position
Atlético de Alagoinhas	Alagoinhas	Agnaldo Liz	1st
Bahia	Salvador	Guto Ferreira	4th
Bahia de Feira	Feira de Santana	Flávio Araújo	2nd
Barcelona de Ilhéus	Ilhéus	Paulo Sales	1st (Série B)
Doce Mel	Ipiaú	Sérgio Araújo	9th
Jacuipense	Riachão do Jacuípe	Rodrigo Chagas	6th
Juazeirense	Juazeiro	Barbosinha	3rd
UNIRB	Alagoinhas	Joel Cornelli	8th
Vitória	Salvador	Dado Cavalcanti	5th
Vitória da Conquista	Vitória da Conquista	Ferreira	7th

== First stage ==
=== Group 1 ===
Pos	Team	Pld	W	D	L	GF	GA	GD	Pts	Qualification or relegation
1	Jacuipense	9	7	0	2	19	10	+9	21	Advance to Semi-finals
2	Atlético de Alagoinhas	9	5	2	2	17	10	+7	17	Advance to Semi-finals
3	Bahia de Feira	9	5	2	2	13	9	+4	17	Advance to Semi-finals
4	Barcelona de Ilhéus	9	4	2	3	6	7	−1	14	Advance to Semi-finals
5	Vitória	9	3	4	2	7	6	+1	13	
6	Bahia	9	3	3	3	13	9	+4	12	
7	Juazeirense	9	2	3	4	7	11	−4	9	
8	Doce Mel	9	2	1	6	8	12	−4	7	
9	Vitória da Conquista (R)	9	2	1	6	5	15	−10	7	Relegation to 2023 Campeonato Baiano Série B
10	UNIRB (R)	9	1	4	4	8	14	−6	7	Relegation to 2023 Campeonato Baiano Série B

Source: FBF
Rules for classification: 1) Points; 2) Wins; 3) Goal difference; 4) Goals scored; 5) Head-to-head result; 6) Fewest red cards; 7) Fewest yellow cards; 8) Draw.
(R) Relegated

== Final stage ==
=== Bracket ===
Semi-finals
3	Bahia de Feira	0	0	0
2	Atlético de Alagoinhas	1	1	2
4	Barcelona de Ilhéus	0	0	0
1	Jacuipense	0	1	1

Finals
2	Atlético de Alagoinhas	1	2	3
1	Jacuipense	1	0	1

=== Semi-finals ===
Team 1	Agg.	Team 2	1st leg	2nd leg
Barcelona de Ilhéus	0–1	Jacuipense	0–0	0–1
Bahia de Feira	0–2	Atlético de Alagoinhas	0–1	0–1

==== Group 2 ====
27 March 2022
16:00

Barcelona de Ilhéus	0–0	Jacuipense
	Report

Estádio Lomanto Júnior, Vitória da Conquista
Attendance: 450
Referee: Emerson Ricardo de Almeida Andrade

30 March 2022
21:30

Jacuipense	1–0	Barcelona de Ilhéus
Welder 29'	Report

Estádio Eliel Martins, Riachão do Jacuípe
Attendance: 2,171
Referee: Marielson Alves Silva

Jacuipense qualified for the finals.

==== Group 3 ====
26 March 2022
16:00

Bahia de Feira	0–1	Atlético de Alagoinhas
	Report	Thiaguinho 50'

Estádio Jodilton Souza, Feira de Santana
Attendance: 1,161
Referee: Marielson Alves Silva

30 March 2022
19:15

Atlético de Alagoinhas	1–0	Bahia de Feira
Thiaguinho 46'	Report

Estádio Municipal Antônio de Figueiredo Carneiro, Alagoinhas
Attendance: 7,533
Referee: Diego Pombo Lopez

Atlético de Alagoinhas qualified for the finals.

=== Finals ===
Team 1	Agg.	Team 2	1st leg	2nd leg
Atlético de Alagoinhas	3–1	Jacuipense	1–1	2–0

==== Group 4 ====
3 April 2022
16:00

Atlético de Alagoinhas	1–1	Jacuipense
Miller 45+3'	Report	Jerry 66' (o.g.)

Estádio Municipal Antônio de Figueiredo Carneiro, Alagoinhas
Attendance: 10,754
Referee: Emerson Ricardo de Almeida Andrade

Atlético de Alagoinhas	Jacuipense

GK	1	(Brazil) Fábio Lima
DF	2	(Brazil) Paulinho Souza		(substituted off) 75'
DF	3	(Brazil) Iran (c)
DF	4	(Brazil) Bremer
DF	16	(Brazil) Matheus Leal		(substituted off) 75'
MF	17	(Brazil) Leandro Sobral		(substituted off) 43'
MF	5	(Brazil) Lucas Alisson
MF	8	(Brazil) Dionísio	(yellow card) 29'	(substituted off) 75'
FW	10	(Brazil) Miller
FW	22	(Brazil) Jerry		(substituted off) 84'
FW	21	(Brazil) Thiaguinho
Substitutes:
GK	12	(Brazil) Jonh Wilquer
DF	6	(Brazil) Caetano		(substituted on) 75'
DF	13	(Brazil) Bruno Miranda
DF	14	(Brazil) Lidio
DF	19	(Brazil) Edson	(red card) 90+2'	(substituted on) 75'
DF	25	(Brazil) Allef Nilvan
MF	11	(Brazil) Diego Costa
MF	15	(Brazil) Jeferson
MF	18	(Brazil) Emerson		(substituted on) 43'
MF	26	(Brazil) Giovane de Jesus
FW	7	(Brazil) Gabriel Esteves		(substituted on) 75'
FW	9	(Brazil) Rael		(substituted on) 84'
Coach:
(Brazil) Agnaldo Liz

GK	23	(Brazil) Mota	(yellow card) 86'
DF	2	(Brazil) Railan
DF	3	(Brazil) Wesley (c)
DF	4	(Brazil) Matheus Cabral
DF	6	(Brazil) Evandro
MF	5	(Brazil) Willian Kaefer	(yellow card) 29'	(substituted off) 85'
MF	8	(Brazil) Flávio		(substituted off) 46'
MF	10	(Brazil) Danilo Rios	(red card) 25'
MF	7	(Brazil) Ruan Levine		(substituted off) 62'
FW	11	(Brazil) Robinho		(substituted off) 62'
FW	9	(Brazil) Welder		(substituted off) 41'
Substitutes:
GK	12	(Brazil) Marcelo
DF	13	(Brazil) Edy	(yellow card) 76'	(substituted on) 62'
DF	14	(Brazil) Renato
DF	15	(Brazil) Paulo Miranda
DF	18	(Brazil) Radar
MF	16	(Brazil) Newton		(substituted on) 41'
MF	17	(Brazil) Fábio Bahia	(yellow card) 90+4'	(substituted on) 85'
FW	19	(Brazil) Jeferson	(yellow card) 90+3'	(substituted on) 46'
FW	20	(Brazil) Eudair
FW	21	(Brazil) Henrique
FW	22	(Brazil) Júlio César
FW	25	(Brazil) Isaías		(substituted on) 62'
Coach:
(Brazil) Rodrigo Chagas

Assistant referees:
Paulo de Tarso Bregalda Gussen
Luanderson Lima dos Santos
Fourth official:
Reinaldo Silva de Santana
Fifth official:
José Carlos Oliveira dos Santos
Video assistant referee:
Diego Pombo Lopez
Assistant video assistant referees:
Ricarle Gustavo Gonçalves Batista

10 April 2022
16:00

Jacuipense	0–2	Atlético de Alagoinhas
	Report	Thiaguinho 15'; Paulinho Souza 90+4'

Estádio Eliel Martins, Riachão do Jacuípe
Attendance: 4,096
Referee: Diego Pombo Lopez

Jacuipense	Atlético de Alagoinhas

GK	23	(Brazil) Mota
DF	2	(Brazil) Railan
DF	3	(Brazil) Renato
DF	4	(Brazil) Matheus Cabral
DF	6	(Brazil) Evandro	Sent off (straight red)	(substituted off) 46'
MF	5	(Brazil) Willian Kaefer (c)
MF	8	(Brazil) Flávio		(substituted off) 58'
MF	10	(Brazil) Eudair		(substituted off) 46'
FW	7	(Brazil) Ruan Levine	Sent off (straight red)	(substituted off) 58'
FW	11	(Brazil) Robinho
FW	9	(Brazil) Jeam		(substituted off) 69'
Substitutes:
GK	12	(Brazil) Marcelo
DF	13	(Brazil) Edy
DF	15	(Brazil) Paulo Miranda
DF	18	(Brazil) Radar	(yellow card) 64'	(substituted on) 46'
MF	16	(Brazil) Newton	(yellow card) 57' (yellow-red card) 64'	(substituted on) 46'
MF	17	(Brazil) Fábio Bahia
MF	25	(Brazil) Fábio Matos
FW	19	(Brazil) Jeferson		(substituted on) 58'
FW	20	(Brazil) Isaías	(yellow card) 82'	(substituted on) 69'
FW	21	(Brazil) Henrique	(yellow card) 89'	(substituted on) 58'
FW	22	(Brazil) Welder
FW	24	(Brazil) Júlio César
Coach:
(Brazil) Rodrigo Chagas

GK	1	(Brazil) Fábio Lima	(yellow card) 42'
DF	2	(Brazil) Paulinho Souza
DF	3	(Brazil) Iran (c)	(yellow card) 8'
DF	4	(Brazil) Bremer
DF	16	(Brazil) Matheus Leal	(yellow card) 89'
MF	17	(Brazil) Leandro Sobral	(yellow card) 45+3'	(substituted off) 67'
MF	5	(Brazil) Lucas Alisson
MF	8	(Brazil) Dionísio		(substituted off) 76'
FW	10	(Brazil) Miller		(substituted off) 87'
FW	22	(Brazil) Jerry
FW	21	(Brazil) Thiaguinho		(substituted off) 87'
Substitutes:
GK	12	(Brazil) Jonh Wilquer
DF	6	(Brazil) Caetano
DF	11	(Brazil) Allef Nilvan		(substituted on) 87'
DF	13	(Brazil) Bruno Miranda
DF	14	(Brazil) Lidio		(substituted on) 87'
MF	15	(Brazil) Jeferson		(substituted on) 67'
MF	18	(Brazil) Emerson		(substituted on) 76'
MF	25	(Brazil) Diego Costa
MF	26	(Brazil) Giovane de Jesus
FW	7	(Brazil) Gabriel Esteves
FW	9	(Brazil) Rael
FW	19	(Brazil) Cesinha
Coach:
(Brazil) Agnaldo Liz

Evandro and Ruan Levine (Jacuipense) were sent off after the final whistle.

Assistant referees:
Elicarlos Franco de Oliveira
Daniella Coutinho Pinto
Fourth official:
Josué Reis de Jesus Júnior
Fifth official:
Carlos Eduardo Bregalda Gussen
Video assistant referee:
Marielson Alves Silva
Assistant video assistant referees:
Bruno Pereira Vasconcelos

== Overall table ==
Pos	Team	Pld	W	D	L	GF	GA	GD	Pts	Qualification or relegation
1	Atlético de Alagoinhas	13	8	3	2	22	11	+11	27	Champions, 2023 Copa do Brasil and 2023 Série D
2	Jacuipense	13	8	2	3	21	13	+8	26	Runners-up, 2023 Copa do Brasil and 2023 Série D
3	Bahia de Feira	11	5	2	4	13	11	+2	17	2023 Copa do Brasil and 2023 Série D
4	Barcelona de Ilhéus	11	4	3	4	6	8	−2	15	
5	Vitória (Note: Vitória and Bahia qualified for the Copa do Brasil via CBF ranking.)	9	3	4	2	7	6	+1	13	2023 Copa do Brasil
6	Bahia	9	3	3	3	13	9	+4	12	2023 Copa do Brasil
7	Juazeirense	9	2	3	4	7	11	−4	9	
8	Doce Mel	9	2	1	6	8	12	−4	7	
9	Vitória da Conquista	9	2	1	6	5	15	−10	7	Relegation to 2023 Campeonato Baiano Série B
10	UNIRB	9	1	4	4	8	14	−6	7	Relegation to 2023 Campeonato Baiano Série B

Source: FBF
Rules for classification: 1) Points; 2) Wins; 3) Goal difference; 4) Goals scored; 5) Head-to-head result; 6) Fewest red cards; 7) Fewest yellow cards; 8) Draw.

== Top goalscorers ==
Rank	Player	Team	Goals
1	(Brazil) Miller	Atlético Alagoinhas	6
2	(Brazil) Thiaguinho	Atlético Alagoinhas	5
3	(Brazil) Deon	Bahia de Feira	4
3	(Brazil) Igor Bádio	UNIRB	4
3	(Brazil) Jeam	Jacuipense	4
3	(Colombia) Hugo Rodallega	Bahia	4
