= 2023 Campeonato Brasileiro Série D =

2023 Brazilian soccer competition

Campeonato Brasileiro Série D
- Season: 2023
- Dates: 6 May – 16 September
- Champions: Ferroviário (2nd title)
- Promoted: Athletic; Caxias; Ferroviária; Ferroviário
- Matches: 510
- Goals: 1,191 (2.34 per match)
- Top goalscorer: Eron (14 goals)
- Biggest home win: Brasiliense 10–0 Interporto; Group A5, R12, 10 July
- Biggest away win: Real Ariquemes 0–8 Anápolis; Group A5, R14, 23 July
- Highest scoring: 10 goals Brasiliense 10–0 Interporto; Group A5, R12, 10 July; Novo Hamburgo 5–5 Hercílio Luz; Group A8, R13, 16 July
- Highest attendance: 28,173; Santa Cruz 1–0 Campinense; Group A3, R3, 21 May
- Lowest attendance: 0 Real Ariquemes 0–8 Anápolis; Group A5, R14, 23 July
- Total attendance: 534,418
- Average attendance: 1,048

The 2023 Campeonato Brasileiro Série D was a football competition held in Brazil, equivalent to the fourth division. The competition began on 6 May and ended on 16 September 2023.

Sixty-four teams competed in the tournament. Sixty teams qualified from their state leagues and cups, and four relegated from the 2022 Campeonato Brasileiro Série C (Atlético Cearense, Brasil de Pelotas, Campinense and Ferroviário).

The four semi-finalists, Athletic, Caxias, Ferroviária and Ferroviário, were promoted to the 2024 Campeonato Brasileiro Série C.

In the finals, Ferroviário won their second title after defeating Ferroviária 2–1 on aggregate. Ferroviário finished the tournament without a single defeat.

== Teams ==
Location of teams in 2023 Série D

=== Federation ranking ===
The number of teams from each state was chosen based on the CBF State Ranking.

Rank	Federation	Coeff.	Teams	Notes
1	(São Paulo (state)) São Paulo	86,414	4	
2	(Rio de Janeiro (state)) Rio de Janeiro	52,133	3	
3	Rio Grande do Sul	40,711	3	+1 (C)
4	Minas Gerais	40,409	3	
5	(Paraná (state)) Paraná	35,018	3	
6	Ceará	28,914	3	+2 (C)
7	Goiás	26,503	3	
8	(Santa Catarina (state)) Santa Catarina	26,156	3	
9	Bahia	19,721	3	
10	Pernambuco	14,405	2	
11	Alagoas	12,334	2	
12	Mato Grosso	11,016	2	
13	Pará	8,846	2	
14	Maranhão	7,951	2	
15	Rio Grande do Norte	5,813	2	
16	Paraíba	5,683	2	+1 (C)
17	Sergipe	4,897	2	
18	Piauí	4,116	2	
19	(Amazonas (Brazilian state)) Amazonas	4,070	2	
20	(Federal District (Brazil)) Distrito Federal	3,406	2	
21	(Acre (state)) Acre	2,770	2	
22	Espírito Santo	2,585	2	
23	Tocantins	1,922	2	
24	Roraima	1,867	1	
25	Mato Grosso do Sul	1,433	1	
26	Rondônia	1,426	1	
27	Amapá	1,303	1	

=== Participating teams ===
Federation	Team	Home city	Qualification method
(Acre (state)) Acre	Humaitá	Porto Acre	2022 Campeonato Acreano champions
(Acre (state)) Acre	São Francisco	Rio Branco	2022 Campeonato Acreano runners-up
Alagoas	ASA	Arapiraca	2022 Campeonato Alagoano runners-up
Alagoas	Cruzeiro de Arapiraca	Arapiraca	2022 Copa Alagoas champions
Amapá	Trem	Macapá	2022 Campeonato Amapaense champions
(Amazonas (Brazilian state)) Amazonas	Princesa do Solimões	Manacapuru	2022 Campeonato Amazonense runners-up
(Amazonas (Brazilian state)) Amazonas	Nacional	Manaus	2022 Campeonato Amazonense 3rd place
Bahia	Atlético de Alagoinhas	Alagoinhas	2022 Campeonato Baiano champions
Bahia	Jacuipense	Riachão do Jacuípe	2022 Campeonato Baiano runners-up
Bahia	Bahia de Feira	Feira de Santana	2022 Campeonato Baiano 3rd place
Ceará	Caucaia	Caucaia	2022 Campeonato Cearense runners-up
Ceará	Iguatu	Iguatu	2022 Campeonato Cearense 4th place
Ceará	Pacajus	Pacajus	2022 Campeonato Cearense 5th place
Ceará	Atlético Cearense	Fortaleza	2022 Série C 17th place
Ceará	Ferroviário	Fortaleza	2022 Série C 19th place
Espírito Santo	Real Noroeste	Águia Branca	2022 Campeonato Capixaba champions
Espírito Santo	Vitória	Vitória	2022 Campeonato Capixaba runners-up
(Federal District (Brazil)) Federal District	Brasiliense	Taguatinga	2022 Campeonato Brasiliense champions
(Federal District (Brazil)) Federal District	Ceilândia	Ceilândia	2022 Campeonato Brasiliense runners-up
Goiás	Iporá	Iporá	2022 Campeonato Goiano 4th place
Goiás	Anápolis	Anápolis	2022 Campeonato Goiano 5th place
Goiás	CRAC	Catalão	2022 Campeonato Goiano 6th place
Maranhão	Cordino	Barra do Corda	2022 Campeonato Maranhense runners-up
Maranhão	Maranhão	São Luís	2022 Copa Federação Maranhense de Futebol runners-up
Mato Grosso	União Rondonópolis	Rondonópolis	2022 Campeonato Mato-Grossense runners-up
Mato Grosso	CEOV	Várzea Grande	2022 Copa FMF runners-up
Mato Grosso do Sul	Operário	Campo Grande	2022 Campeonato Sul-Mato-Grossense champions
Minas Gerais	Athletic	São João del-Rei	2022 Campeonato Mineiro 3rd place
Minas Gerais	Patrocinense (Note: Caldense and Villa Nova (2022 Campeonato Mineiro 4th place and 8th place, respectively) declined to participate in the Série D. They were replaced by the 9th place Patrocinense.)	Patrocínio	2022 Campeonato Mineiro 9th place
Minas Gerais	Democrata GV	Governador Valadares	2022 Troféu Inconfidência winners
Pará	Tuna Luso	Belém	2022 Campeonato Paraense 3rd place
Pará	Águia de Marabá	Marabá	2022 Campeonato Paraense 4th place
Paraíba	Sousa	Sousa	2022 Campeonato Paraibano 3rd place
Paraíba	Nacional de Patos	Patos	2022 Campeonato Paraibano 4th place
Paraíba	Campinense	Campina Grande	2022 Série C 20th place
(Paraná (state)) Paraná	Maringá	Maringá	2022 Campeonato Paranaense runners-up
(Paraná (state)) Paraná	São Joseense	São José dos Pinhais	2022 Campeonato Paranaense 6th place
(Paraná (state)) Paraná	FC Cascavel	Cascavel	2022 Campeonato Paranaense 7th place
Pernambuco	Retrô	Camaragibe	2022 Campeonato Pernambucano first stage winners
Pernambuco	Santa Cruz	Recife	2022 Campeonato Pernambucano first stage 3rd place
Piauí	Fluminense	Teresina	2022 Campeonato Piauiense champions
Piauí	Parnahyba	Parnaíba	2022 Campeonato Piauiense runners-up
(Rio de Janeiro (state)) Rio de Janeiro	Resende	Resende	2022 Campeonato Carioca 5th place
(Rio de Janeiro (state)) Rio de Janeiro	Nova Iguaçu	Nova Iguaçu	2022 Campeonato Carioca 6th place
(Rio de Janeiro (state)) Rio de Janeiro	Portuguesa	Rio de Janeiro	2022 Copa Rio runners-up
Rio Grande do Norte	Potiguar de Mossoró	Mossoró	2022 Campeonato Potiguar 3rd place
Rio Grande do Norte	Globo	Ceará-Mirim	2022 Campeonato Potiguar 4th place
Rio Grande do Sul	Caxias	Caxias do Sul	2022 Campeonato Gaúcho 5th place
Rio Grande do Sul	Novo Hamburgo	Novo Hamburgo	2022 Campeonato Gaúcho 7th place
Rio Grande do Sul	Aimoré	São Leopoldo	2022 Campeonato Gaúcho 8th place
Rio Grande do Sul	Brasil de Pelotas	Pelotas	2022 Série C 18th place
Rondônia	Real Ariquemes	Ariquemes	2022 Campeonato Rondoniense champions
Roraima	São Raimundo	Boa Vista	2022 Campeonato Roraimense champions
(Santa Catarina (state)) Santa Catarina	Camboriú	Camboriú	2022 Campeonato Catarinense runners-up
(Santa Catarina (state)) Santa Catarina	Concórdia	Concórdia	2022 Campeonato Catarinense 3rd place
(Santa Catarina (state)) Santa Catarina	Hercílio Luz	Tubarão	2022 Campeonato Catarinense 5th place
(São Paulo (state)) São Paulo	Santo André	Santo André	2022 Campeonato Paulista 8th place
(São Paulo (state)) São Paulo	Ferroviária	Araraquara	2022 Campeonato Paulista 12th place
(São Paulo (state)) São Paulo	Inter de Limeira	Limeira	2022 Campeonato Paulista 13th place
(São Paulo (state)) São Paulo	XV de Piracicaba	Piracicaba	2022 Copa Paulista champions
Sergipe	Sergipe	Aracaju	2022 Campeonato Sergipano champions
Sergipe	Falcon	Barra dos Coqueiros	2022 Campeonato Sergipano runners-up
Tocantins	Tocantinópolis	Tocantinópolis	2022 Campeonato Tocantinense champions
Tocantins	Interporto	Porto Nacional	2022 Campeonato Tocantinense runners-up

== Format ==
In the group stage, the 64 teams were divided into eight groups of eight organized regionally. Top four teams qualified for the round of 32. From the round of 32 on the competition was played as a knock-out tournament with each round contested over two legs.

== Group stage ==
In the group stage, each group was played on a home-and-away round-robin basis. The teams were ranked according to points (3 points for a win, 1 point for a draw, and 0 points for a loss). If tied on points, the following criteria would be used to determine the ranking: 1. Wins; 2. Goal difference; 3. Goals scored; 4. Head-to-head (if the tie was only between two teams); 5. Fewest red cards; 6. Fewest yellow cards; 7. Draw in the headquarters of the Brazilian Football Confederation (Regulations Article 14).

The top four teams qualified for the round of 32.

=== Group A1 ===
Pos	Team	Pld	W	D	L	GF	GA	GD	Pts	Qualification	NAC	TUN	AGU	PRI	SRA	HUM	SFR	TRE
1	(Amazonas (Brazilian state)) Nacional	14	9	3	2	22	7	+15	30	Advance to round of 32		2–1	0–0	1–0	3–0	3–1	2–0	2–0
2	(Pará) Tuna Luso	14	8	4	2	21	10	+11	28	Advance to round of 32	2–1		0–0	1–0	4–1	2–0	2–0	1–0
3	(Pará) Águia de Marabá	14	6	6	2	18	8	+10	24	Advance to round of 32	1–1	1–3		3–0	6–1	2–0	2–0	0–0
4	(Amazonas (Brazilian state)) Princesa do Solimões	14	4	7	3	21	13	+8	19	Advance to round of 32	1–1	1–1	0–0		1–1	5–0	4–0	2–1
5	(Roraima) São Raimundo	14	5	3	6	24	24	0	18		1–0	2–2	3–1	1–1		2–3	7–0	3–0
6	(Acre (state)) Humaitá	14	5	3	6	16	21	−5	18		0–2	1–1	0–0	2–2	1–0		0–1	3–0
7	(Acre (state)) São Francisco	14	3	0	11	5	33	−28	9		0–3	0–1	0–1	0–3	1–0	1–4		1–0
8	(Amapá) Trem	14	2	2	10	8	19	−11	8		0–1	1–0	0–1	1–1	1–2	0–1	4–1	

Source: CBF
Rules for classification: 1) points; 2) wins; 3) goal difference; 4) goals scored; 5) head-to-head results (only between 2 teams); 6) fewest red cards; 7) fewest yellow cards; 8) draw.

=== Group A2 ===
Pos	Team	Pld	W	D	L	GF	GA	GD	Pts	Qualification	FER	ATL	MAR	PAR	CAU	TOC	COR	FLU
1	(Ceará) Ferroviário	14	11	3	0	30	6	+24	36	Advance to round of 32		2–1	3–1	6–0	1–0	1–0	6–1	2–0
2	(Ceará) Atlético Cearense	14	6	5	3	22	15	+7	23	Advance to round of 32	0–2		1–0	1–1	3–0	3–1	2–1	1–1
3	Maranhão	14	5	6	3	18	11	+7	21	Advance to round of 32	1–1	1–1		4–0	1–0	2–1	1–1	2–0
4	(Piauí) Parnahyba	14	4	5	5	14	23	−9	17	Advance to round of 32	0–1	1–1	0–3		1–1	1–0	3–0	2–1
5	(Ceará) Caucaia	14	3	7	4	20	20	0	16		1–1	1–3	0–0	2–0		3–3	2–2	3–1
6	(Tocantins) Tocantinópolis	14	3	6	5	14	15	−1	15		1–1	2–0	0–0	1–1	1–1		2–0	1–1
7	(Maranhão) Cordino	14	2	5	7	13	26	−13	11		0–1	2–2	2–1	1–1	1–4	0–1		2–0
8	(Piauí) Fluminense	14	1	5	8	9	24	−15	8		0–2	0–3	1–1	1–3	2–2	1–0	0–0	

Source: CBF
Rules for classification: 1) points; 2) wins; 3) goal difference; 4) goals scored; 5) head-to-head results (only between 2 teams); 6) fewest red cards; 7) fewest yellow cards; 8) draw.

=== Group A3 ===
Pos	Team	Pld	W	D	L	GF	GA	GD	Pts	Qualification	SOU	NAC	POT	PAC	CAM	SAN	IGU	GLO
1	(Paraíba) Sousa	14	8	2	4	24	15	+9	26	Advance to round of 32		1–0	1–1	2–1	2–1	2–1	2–1	4–0
2	(Paraíba) Nacional de Patos	14	7	3	4	17	11	+6	24	Advance to round of 32	1–0		2–0	1–0	2–1	2–2	3–1	2–1
3	(Rio Grande do Norte) Potiguar de Mossoró	14	6	5	3	16	11	+5	23	Advance to round of 32	2–1	0–0		5–1	0–0	2–1	1–0	2–0
4	(Ceará) Pacajus	14	6	4	4	21	16	+5	22	Advance to round of 32	1–1	1–0	2–0		2–2	0–0	4–1	3–0
5	(Paraíba) Campinense	14	6	3	5	18	14	+4	21		1–2	1–0	1–0	3–2		2–0	0–0	4–0
6	(Pernambuco) Santa Cruz	14	5	5	4	15	12	+3	20		1–0	2–2	1–1	0–0	1–0		1–0	3–0
7	(Ceará) Iguatu	14	5	1	8	16	19	−3	16		2–1	1–0	1–2	1–2	3–1	1–0		3–0
8	(Rio Grande do Norte) Globo	14	1	1	12	5	34	−29	4		2–5	0–2	0–0	0–2	0–1	0–2	2–1	

Source: CBF
Rules for classification: 1) points; 2) wins; 3) goal difference; 4) goals scored; 5) head-to-head results (only between 2 teams); 6) fewest red cards; 7) fewest yellow cards; 8) draw.

=== Group A4 ===
Pos	Team	Pld	W	D	L	GF	GA	GD	Pts	Qualification	RET	BAH	ASA	FAL	SER	CRU	ATL	JAC
1	(Pernambuco) Retrô	14	7	5	2	19	13	+6	26	Advance to round of 32		1–0	3–1	1–2	1–1	1–1	2–1	1–1
2	Bahia de Feira	14	5	6	3	15	9	+6	21	Advance to round of 32	1–1		1–0	3–1	3–1	3–0	2–1	2–2
3	(Alagoas) ASA	14	6	1	7	14	16	−2	19	Advance to round of 32	1–2	1–0		1–0	1–1	0–2	0–1	3–2
4	(Sergipe) Falcon	14	5	4	5	16	15	+1	19	Advance to round of 32	1–1	0–0	0–1		0–1	4–1	1–0	1–1
5	Sergipe	14	5	4	5	19	19	0	19		0–1	1–0	2–1	1–3		2–1	2–3	1–2
6	(Alagoas) Cruzeiro de Arapiraca	14	5	3	6	13	22	−9	18		2–1	0–0	0–2	1–1	0–3		1–0	1–0
7	(Bahia) Atlético de Alagoinhas	14	4	3	7	15	18	−3	15		1–2	0–0	1–0	1–2	1–1	1–2		1–0
8	(Bahia) Jacuipense	14	3	6	5	20	19	+1	15		0–1	0–0	1–2	2–0	2–2	4–1	3–3	

Source: CBF
Rules for classification: 1) points; 2) wins; 3) goal difference; 4) goals scored; 5) head-to-head results (only between 2 teams); 6) fewest red cards; 7) fewest yellow cards; 8) draw.

=== Group A5 ===
Pos	Team	Pld	W	D	L	GF	GA	GD	Pts	Qualification	CEI	ANA	CEO	BRA	UNI	IPO	INT	REA
1	(Federal District (Brazil)) Ceilândia	14	7	7	0	28	5	+23	28	Advance to round of 32		1–1	0–0	1–1	2–0	4–0	4–0	3–0
2	(Goiás) Anápolis	14	6	7	1	26	6	+20	25	Advance to round of 32	0–1		3–0	0–0	1–0	1–0	7–0	1–0
3	(Mato Grosso) CEOV	14	7	3	4	29	16	+13	24	Advance to round of 32	2–2	1–1		0–2	2–1	2–1	6–0	9–0
4	(Federal District (Brazil)) Brasiliense	14	6	6	2	31	11	+20	24	Advance to round of 32	0–0	2–2	4–1		3–0	3–3	10–0	5–1
5	(Mato Grosso) União Rondonópolis	14	7	2	5	17	9	+8	23		0–0	0–0	2–0	2–0		3–0	3–0	3–0
6	(Goiás) Iporá	14	4	4	6	20	20	0	16		1–1	1–1	0–2	0–0	1–0		8–1	2–0
7	(Tocantins) Interporto	14	1	3	10	3	47	−44	6		0–2	0–0	0–2	1–0	0–2	0–2		1–1
8	(Rondônia) Real Ariquemes	14	1	2	11	4	44	−40	5		0–7	0–8	0–2	0–1	0–1	2–1	0–0	

Source: CBF
Rules for classification: 1) points; 2) wins; 3) goal difference; 4) goals scored; 5) head-to-head results (only between 2 teams); 6) fewest red cards; 7) fewest yellow cards; 8) draw.

=== Group A6 ===
Pos	Team	Pld	W	D	L	GF	GA	GD	Pts	Qualification	ATH	POR	DEM	VIT	SAN	RES	NOV	REA
1	(Minas Gerais) Athletic	14	9	2	3	19	9	+10	29	Advance to round of 32		1–2	1–0	0–0	4–2	3–0	3–1	1–0
2	(Rio de Janeiro (state)) Portuguesa	14	8	5	1	25	12	+13	29	Advance to round of 32	1–0		4–1	3–2	3–0	3–2	2–2	5–2
3	(Minas Gerais) Democrata GV	14	7	4	3	18	15	+3	25	Advance to round of 32	1–0	1–0		4–2	1–1	2–0	1–0	2–2
4	(Espírito Santo) Vitória	14	6	2	6	23	20	+3	20	Advance to round of 32	1–2	0–1	3–1		3–1	1–1	3–2	2–0
5	(São Paulo (state)) Santo André	14	5	4	5	15	16	−1	19		0–1	0–0	1–1	1–0		1–1	2–0	2–0
6	(Rio de Janeiro (state)) Resende	14	3	5	6	12	18	−6	14		0–0	0–0	0–1	1–2	2–0		3–1	1–1
7	(Rio de Janeiro (state)) Nova Iguaçu	14	2	4	8	15	23	−8	10		1–2	1–1	0–0	3–2	0–1	3–0		1–1
8	(Espírito Santo) Real Noroeste	14	1	4	9	9	23	−14	7		0–1	0–0	1–2	0–2	0–3	0–1	2–0	

Source: CBF
Rules for classification: 1) points; 2) wins; 3) goal difference; 4) goals scored; 5) head-to-head results (only between 2 teams); 6) fewest red cards; 7) fewest yellow cards; 8) draw.

=== Group A7 ===
Pos	Team	Pld	W	D	L	GF	GA	GD	Pts	Qualification	PAT	MAR	INT	FER	CRA	XVP	CAS	OPE
1	(Minas Gerais) Patrocinense	14	6	6	2	16	8	+8	24	Advance to round of 32		0–0	1–1	1–0	2–0	2–0	1–0	3–0
2	(Paraná (state)) Maringá	14	6	6	2	13	8	+5	24	Advance to round of 32	1–0		1–0	0–0	0–1	3–2	0–0	2–0
3	(São Paulo (state)) Inter de Limeira	14	6	4	4	15	15	0	22	Advance to round of 32	1–0	1–0		1–0	0–1	3–6	1–1	2–1
4	(São Paulo (state)) Ferroviária	14	5	5	4	16	11	+5	20	Advance to round of 32	1–1	1–2	1–2		0–0	4–2	1–0	0–0
5	(Goiás) CRAC	14	5	3	6	16	14	+2	18		1–2	1–1	2–2	0–1		1–2	1–2	4–0
6	(São Paulo (state)) XV de Piracicaba	14	4	4	6	20	21	−1	16		1–1	1–1	0–1	1–1	2–0		1–2	1–0
7	(Paraná (state)) FC Cascavel	14	3	7	4	12	17	−5	16		1–1	1–1	0–0	1–5	0–2	2–1		1–1
8	(Mato Grosso do Sul) Operário	14	1	5	8	5	19	−14	8		1–1	0–1	1–0	0–1	0–2	0–0	1–1	

Source: CBF
Rules for classification: 1) points; 2) wins; 3) goal difference; 4) goals scored; 5) head-to-head results (only between 2 teams); 6) fewest red cards; 7) fewest yellow cards; 8) draw.

=== Group A8 ===
Pos	Team	Pld	W	D	L	GF	GA	GD	Pts	Qualification	HER	CAX	CAM	BRA	SAO	CON	AIM	NOV
1	(Santa Catarina (state)) Hercílio Luz	14	8	5	1	21	10	+11	29	Advance to round of 32		2–2	2–1	1–0	3–0	2–0	2–0	1–0
2	(Rio Grande do Sul) Caxias	14	7	2	5	19	16	+3	23	Advance to round of 32	0–1		1–0	2–1	2–1	2–0	3–1	2–0
3	(Santa Catarina (state)) Camboriú	14	6	4	4	19	14	+5	22	Advance to round of 32	1–1	2–1		0–2	3–3	1–0	1–0	1–0
4	(Rio Grande do Sul) Brasil de Pelotas	14	5	5	4	15	13	+2	20	Advance to round of 32	1–0	2–1	1–1		2–2	1–0	2–2	1–0
5	(Paraná (state)) São Joseense	14	5	5	4	15	15	0	20		0–0	2–1	2–0	1–0		0–1	0–0	2–1
6	(Santa Catarina (state)) Concórdia	14	5	4	5	15	13	+2	19		0–1	4–0	1–1	2–1	1–1		3–1	1–1
7	(Rio Grande do Sul) Aimoré	14	1	7	6	8	21	−13	10		0–0	0–0	0–4	1–1	1–0	0–0		1–1
8	(Rio Grande do Sul) Novo Hamburgo	14	1	4	9	13	23	−10	7		5–5	0–2	0–3	0–0	0–1	1–2	4–1	

Source: CBF
Rules for classification: 1) points; 2) wins; 3) goal difference; 4) goals scored; 5) head-to-head results (only between 2 teams); 6) fewest red cards; 7) fewest yellow cards; 8) draw.

== Final stages ==
The final stages were played on a home-and-away two-legged basis. For the round of 16, semi-finals and finals, the best-overall-performance team hosted the second leg. If tied on aggregate, the away goals rule would not be used, extra time would not be played, and the penalty shoot-out would be used to determine the winners (Regulations Article 19).

For the quarter-finals, teams were seeded based on the table of results of all matches in the competition. The top four seeded teams hosted the second leg.

The four quarter-finals winners were promoted to 2024 Série C.

=== Round of 32 ===
The round of 32 was a two-legged knockout tie, with the draw regionalised. The matches were played from 29 July to 6 August.

==== Matches ====
Team 1	Agg.	Team 2	1st leg	2nd leg
Parnahyba (Piauí)	2–3	(Amazonas (Brazilian state)) Nacional	2–0	0–3
Águia de Marabá (Pará)	1–4	(Ceará) Atlético Cearense	1–1	0–3
Princesa do Solimões (Amazonas (Brazilian state))	1–4	(Ceará) Ferroviário	1–1	0–3
Maranhão	3–3 (5–4 p)	(Pará) Tuna Luso	2–3	1–0
Falcon (Sergipe)	2–3	(Paraíba) Sousa	1–1	1–2
Potiguar de Mossoró (Rio Grande do Norte)	1–1 (6–7 p)	Bahia de Feira	1–0	0–1
Pacajus (Ceará)	2–4	(Pernambuco) Retrô	1–2	1–2
ASA (Alagoas)	2–3	(Paraíba) Nacional de Patos	1–0	1–3
Vitória (Espírito Santo)	1–3	(Federal District (Brazil)) Ceilândia	1–0	0–3
CEOV (Mato Grosso)	1–4	(Rio de Janeiro (state)) Portuguesa	1–0	0–4
Brasiliense (Federal District (Brazil))	0–2	(Minas Gerais) Athletic	0–2	0–0
Democrata GV (Minas Gerais)	1–3	(Goiás) Anápolis	0–0	1–3
Brasil de Pelotas (Rio Grande do Sul)	1–2	(Minas Gerais) Patrocinense	0–0	1–2
Inter de Limeira (São Paulo (state))	1–2	(Rio Grande do Sul) Caxias	0–1	1–1
Ferroviária (São Paulo (state))	3–3 (4–2 p)	(Santa Catarina (state)) Hercílio Luz	1–1	2–2
Camboriú (Santa Catarina (state))	1–1 (6–5 p)	(Paraná (state)) Maringá	0–0	1–1

=== Round of 16 ===
The matches were played from 12 to 20 August.

==== Matches ====
Team 1	Agg.	Team 2	1st leg	2nd leg
Bahia de Feira	4–3	(Amazonas (Brazilian state)) Nacional	2–0	2–3
Atlético Cearense (Ceará)	2–4	(Paraíba) Sousa	1–2	1–2
Nacional de Patos (Paraíba)	1–3	(Ceará) Ferroviário	0–0	1–3
Maranhão	2–2 (6–5 p)	(Pernambuco) Retrô	0–0	2–2
Caxias (Rio Grande do Sul)	0–0 (7–6 p)	(Federal District (Brazil)) Ceilândia	0–0	0–0
Patrocinense (Minas Gerais)	1–3	(Rio de Janeiro (state)) Portuguesa	0–0	1–3
Camboriú (Santa Catarina (state))	1–2	(Minas Gerais) Athletic	1–0	0–2
Ferroviária (São Paulo (state))	2–0	(Goiás) Anápolis	1–0	1–0

=== Quarter-finals ===
The draw for the quarter-finals was seeded based on the table of results of all matches in the competition for the qualifying teams. The teams were ranked according to points. If tied on points, the following criteria would be used to determine the ranking: 1. Wins; 2. Goal difference; 3. Goals scored; 4. Fewest red cards; 5. Fewest yellow cards; 6. Draw in the headquarters of the Brazilian Football Confederation (Regulations Article 16).

==== Quarter-finals seedings ====
Seed	Team	Pts	W	GD
1	(Ceará) Ferroviário	44	13	+29
2	(Minas Gerais) Athletic	36	11	+13
3	(Paraíba) Sousa	36	11	+12
4	(Rio de Janeiro (state)) Portuguesa	36	10	+18
5	(Rio Grande do Sul) Caxias	29	8	+4
6	(São Paulo (state)) Ferroviária	28	7	+7
7	Bahia de Feira	27	7	+7
8	Maranhão	26	6	+7

==== Matches ====
The matches were played from 26 August to 3 September.

Team 1	Agg.	Team 2	1st leg	2nd leg
Maranhão	2–2 (0–3 p)	(Ceará) Ferroviário	1–1	1–1
Caxias (Rio Grande do Sul)	2–1	(Rio de Janeiro (state)) Portuguesa	1–1	1–0
Bahia de Feira	1–2	(Minas Gerais) Athletic	0–2	1–0
Ferroviária (São Paulo (state))	2–1	(Paraíba) Sousa	1–0	1–1

=== Semi-finals ===
The matches were played from 6 to 10 September.

==== Matches ====
Team 1	Agg.	Team 2	1st leg	2nd leg
Caxias (Rio Grande do Sul)	1–2	(Ceará) Ferroviário	1–1	0–1
Ferroviária (São Paulo (state))	3–1	(Minas Gerais) Athletic	1–0	2–1

=== Finals ===
The matches were played from 13 to 16 September.

==== Matches ====
Team 1	Agg.	Team 2	1st leg	2nd leg
Ferroviária (São Paulo (state))	1–2	(Ceará) Ferroviário	0–0	1–2

13 September 2023
20:00

Ferroviária (São Paulo (state))	0–0	(Ceará) Ferroviário
	Report

Fonte Luminosa, Araraquara
Attendance: 4,199
Referee: Maguielson Lima Barbosa (Distrito Federal)

16 September 2023
16:00

Ferroviário (Ceará)	2–1	(São Paulo (state)) Ferroviária
Deysinho 1'; Ciel 51'	Report	Vitor Barreto 38'

Estádio Presidente Vargas, Fortaleza
Attendance: 12,524
Referee: Leandro Pedro Vuaden (Rio Grande do Sul)

== Top goalscorers ==
Rank	Player	Team	Goals
1	Eron	(Rio Grande do Sul) Caxias	14
2	Marcelo Toscano	(Rio de Janeiro (state)) Portuguesa	13
3	Ciel	(Ceará) Ferroviário	12
3	Pablo Thomaz	(Mato Grosso) CEOV	12
5	Tony	(Espírito Santo) Vitória	9
6	Carlinhos	(Santa Catarina (state)) Camboriú	8
7	Alisson	(Ceará) Ferroviário	7
7	Brandão	(Minas Gerais) Athletic	7
7	Iury	(Amazonas (Brazilian state)) Nacional	7
7	Neto Oliveira	(Sergipe) Falcon	7
7	Paulo Rangel	(Pará) Tuna Luso	7
7	Romarinho	(Federal District (Brazil)) Ceilândia	7

Source: CBF
