= Agnaldo Liz =

Brazilian football manager (born 1968)

Personal information
- Full name: Agnaldo Liz Souza
- Date of birth: 7 June 1968 (age 58)
- Place of birth: Florianópolis, Brazil
- Height: 1.80 m (5 ft 11 in)
- Position: Centre back

Team information
- Current team: Atlético de Alagoinhas (head coach)

Senior career*
Years	Team	Apps	(Gls)
1986–1991	Figueirense		
1991–1993	Vitória		
1993–1994	Grêmio	58	(12)
1995	Flamengo	28	(1)
1996	Guarani	1	(0)
1996	Vitória	8	(0)
1997–2000	Palmeiras	59	(1)
2000–2001	Fluminense	19	(0)
2002	América Mineiro	0	(0)
2002	Olaria		
2002	União São João	4	(0)
2003	Lages		

Managerial career
- 2003: Tubarão FC
- 2004: Vitória
- 2004: Guarani
- 2005: Tubarão FC
- 2005: Ituano
- 2006: Tubarão FC
- 2006: CSA
- 2007: Comercial-SP
- 2007: Sampaio Corrêa
- 2007: Pelotas
- 2008: Catanduvense
- 2008: Itumbiara
- 2009: Coruripe
- 2009: Catanduvense
- 2010: Atlético Alagoinhas
- 2010: Rio Claro
- 2011: Campinense
- 2012: Fluminense de Feira
- 2012: Guarany de Sobral
- 2013: Curitibanos
- 2014: Atlético Alagoinhas
- 2017: Hercílio Luz
- 2018: Almirante Barroso
- 2020: Vitória U23
- 2020: Atlético Alagoinhas
- 2020: Barcelona de Ilhéus
- 2021–2022: Atlético Alagoinhas
- 2022: Altos
- 2022: Juazeirense
- 2023: Atlético Alagoinhas
- 2023: Jacobinense
- 2023: São Carlos
- 2024: Paranoá
- 2024: Carajás
- 2025: Atlético de Alagoinhas
- 2025: Lagarto
- 2026–: Atlético de Alagoinhas
- * Club domestic league appearances and goals

Agnaldo Liz Souza (born 7 June 1968) is a Brazilian football coach and former player who played as a central defender. He is the current head coach of Atlético de Alagoinhas.

== Playing career ==
Known as Agnaldo during his playing days, he was born in Florianópolis, Santa Catarina, and began his career with hometown side Figueirense in 1986. He moved to Vitória in 1991, being a regular starter before joining Grêmio in 1993.

Ahead of the 1995 season, Agnaldo signed a contract with Flamengo, but featured sparingly. He moved to Guarani in 1996, playing in only one match before subsequently returning to Vitória.

In 1997, Agnaldo agreed to a deal with Palmeiras, remaining at the club until 2000. He then represented Fluminense, América Mineiro, Olaria, União São João and Lages, retiring with the latter in 2003 at the age of 34.

== Managerial career ==
Shortly after retiring, Liz became a manager and took over Tubarão FC. On 27 December 2003, he took over former side Vitória, winning the 2004 Campeonato Baiano but being sacked on 30 June.

Liz was named in charge of Guarani in the Série A on 24 August 2004, but was dismissed on 4 October, with the club in the last position. He then returned to Tubarão for the 2005 campaign, before being named manager of Ituano on 26 February; he only managed the side one match before resigning six days later.

Liz returned to Tubarão once again before taking over CSA in February 2006. He was sacked by the latter in April, and worked for a brief period at Comercial-SP in the first months of the 2007 season.

On 6 February 2007, Liz was appointed Sampaio Corrêa manager, but was relieved of his duties on 9 March, after the club's elimination from the first phase of the Campeonato Maranhense. He took over Pelotas on 4 May, before being named at the helm of Catanduvense on 19 October.

Liz managed Itumbiara during the 2008 season, and later worked at Coruripe before returning to Catanduvense on 3 June 2009. The following 25 January, he was appointed manager of Atlético Alagoinhas.

Liz left Alagoinhas on 17 February 2010 to take over Rio Claro, and later was ahead of Campinense during the 2011 season. On 24 October 2011, he was named manager of Fluminense de Feira for the 2012 season, but was sacked on 15 February.

On 24 July 2012, Liz was appointed in charge of Guarany de Sobral, but resigned on 20 August. He worked for a brief period at Curitibanos in 2013, before returning to Atlético Alagoinhas on 3 April 2014.

On 22 May 2017, after spending two years managing the Santa Catarina Athletes Union, Liz was presented at Hercílio Luz, but was dismissed by the club on 31 August. The following 12 February, he was named manager of Almirante Barroso, and later spent more than a year without coaching before being appointed manager of the under-23 side of Vitória on 26 November 2019.

On 19 March 2020, Liz was fired from Vitória after the club closed the under-23 team. He later returned to Atlético Alagoinhas, but left the club on 19 October as their financial problems worsened.

On 21 October 2020, Liz took over Barcelona de Ilhéus, and returned to Atlético Alagoinhas on 24 June 2021. He won the 2022 Campeonato Baiano with the side before being named manager of Série C side Altos on 11 April 2022.

On 26 April 2022, after just two matches in charge, Liz was sacked by Altos.

== Honours ==
=== Player ===
Vitória

- Campeonato Baiano: 1992

Grêmio

- Copa do Brasil: 1994

Palmeiras

- Copa do Brasil: 1998
- Copa Mercosur: 1998
- Copa Libertadores: 1999
- Torneio Rio – São Paulo: 2000
- Copa dos Campeões: 2000

=== Manager ===
Vitória

- Campeonato Baiano: 2004

Atlético Alagoinhas

- Campeonato Baiano: 2022
