= Jefferson Maranhão =

Jefferson Maranhão may refer to:

- Jefferson Maranhão (footballer, born 1989), Jefferson Viana Correa, Brazilian football midfielder
- Jefferson Maranhão (footballer, born 1993), Jefferson Douglas Damião Correia, Brazilian football attacking midfielder
