= Luan Carlos =

Brazilian football coach

Personal information
- Full name: Luan Carlos Neto
- Date of birth: 21 May 1992 (age 34)
- Place of birth: Ipameri, Brazil
- Position: Defender

Team information
- Current team: Nacional-AM (head coach)

Youth career
- Years: Team
- Novo Horizonte

Managerial career
- 2015: Novo Horizonte (interim)
- 2016: Novo Horizonte
- 2017: Grêmio Anápolis
- 2017: Novo Horizonte
- 2018: Uniclinic
- 2018: Novo Horizonte
- 2019: Atlético Cearense
- 2019–2020: Floresta
- 2020: Caucaia
- 2020–2021: Goianésia
- 2021: Brusque (assistant)
- 2021: Brasiliense
- 2022: Camboriú
- 2022: Caxias
- 2022: Brusque
- 2022–2023: Brasiliense
- 2023: Campinense
- 2023: Altos
- 2024: Goianésia
- 2024: Camboriú
- 2025: Goiânia
- 2025: CRAC
- 2025: Centro Oeste
- 2026: CRAC
- 2026: Anápolis
- 2026: Rio Verde
- 2027–: Nacional-AM

Luan Carlos Neto (born 21 May 1992), known as Luan Carlos, is a Brazilian football coach, currently the head coach of Nacional-AM.

== Career ==
Born in Ipameri, Goiás, Luan Carlos played youth football for hometown side Novo Horizonte, but retired at the age of 15 due to a knee injury. He then turned into coaching, finishing his Physical Education graduation in 2012 before reaching the age of 20 and returning to Novo Horizonte in 2014, as a fitness coach.

Luan Carlos was an interim head coach of Novo Horizonte for two matches in the 2015 Campeonato Goiano - Segunda Divisão, and was named permanent head coach of the side in August 2016, in the place of Wladimir Araújo. On 26 April 2017, he was appointed head coach of Grêmio Anápolis, but returned to Novo Horizonte in July.

On 16 December 2017, Luan Carlos was named in charge of Uniclinic, and led the side to the third place of the 2018 Campeonato Cearense. He subsequently rejoined Novo Horizonte and led the side to the first division of the Campeonato Goiano after a ten-year absence.

Announced back at Uniclinic for the 2019 season, as the club was now named Atlético Cearense, Luan Carlos left on 25 June to take over Floresta, but was sacked on 28 January 2020. On 3 February 2020, he was announced at Caucaia, but resigned ten days later after alleging personal reasons.

On 9 March 2020, Luan Carlos returned to his native state after being named at the helm of Goianésia. Dismissed on 28 March 2021, he moved to Brusque on 27 April as Jerson Testoni's assistant.

On 17 August 2021, Luan Carlos was appointed head coach of Série D side Brasiliense. He left on a mutual agreement on 7 November, and was named in charge of Camboriú eighteen days later.

Luan Carlos led Camboriú to their best-ever position in the 2022 Campeonato Catarinense, losing the finals to Brusque. He was appointed Caxias head coach on 3 April 2022, but left the club on 16 May to return to Brusque, now as head coach. He was sacked by the latter club on 31 August.

After returning to Brasiliense and being in charge of fourth division side Campinense, Luan Carlos was named head coach of Altos in the Série C on 27 June 2023. On 24 July, after four winless matches, he resigned.

In the following seasons, Luan Carlos coached clubs from the state of Goiás, being in charge of Goianésia, Goiânia, CRAC (two stints) and Centro Oeste, aside from a short stint at Camboriú. On 15 July 2026, he returned to the third division with Anápolis.

On 21 October 2026, after a short stint at Rio Verde, Luan Carlos was appointed head coach of Nacional-AM also in division three.

== Personal life ==
Luan Carlos is the son of Paulo Marcos, a former footballer and coach who notably represented Internacional. He only knew his father at the age of 16.
