= Neguete (footballer, born 1987) =

Brazilian footballer

Personal information
- Full name: Rodrigo dos Santos Silva
- Date of birth: 22 January 1987 (age 39)
- Place of birth: Umuarama, Brazil
- Height: 1.81 m (5 ft 11 in)
- Position: Centre-back

Senior career*
Years	Team	Apps	(Gls)
2009–2010	São Luiz	28	(0)
2011	Chapecoense	6	(1)
2011	Brusque	4	(0)
2012	São Luiz	13	(0)
2012	Caxias	3	(0)
2013	Hermann Aichinger	10	(1)
2013	Brusque	4	(0)
2014	Cerâmica	0	(0)
2015	Marcílio Dias	13	(0)
2015–2020	Brusque	114	(2)
2016	→ Marcílio Dias (loan)	7	(0)
2017	→ Concórdia (loan)	13	(1)
2018	→ Camboriú (loan)	14	(0)
2021	Operário-MT	10	(0)
2021	Camboriú	19	(0)
2021	Inhumas	5	(0)
2022	Camboriú	9	(0)
2022	Carlos Renaux	20	(0)
2023	Camboriú	0	(0)
2023	Metropolitano	6	(1)
2024	Andraus	6	(0)
- * Club domestic league appearances and goals as of 20 October 2023

Rodrigo dos Santos Silva (born 22 January 1987), better known as Neguete, is a Brazilian former professional footballer who played as a centre-back.

== Career ==
A native of Paraná, Neguete played for several clubs in the southern region of Brazil, most notably during his time at Brusque, where the athlete won five titles and became one of the main players in the club's history.

On 2023 season, Neguete played for CA Metropolitano. After playing for Andraus in 2024, he retired as a player.

== Honours ==
Brusque

- Campeonato Brasileiro Série D: 2019
- Copa Santa Catarina: 2018, 2019
- Recopa Catarinense: 2020
- Campeonato Catarinense Série B: 2015

Concórdia

- Campeonato Catarinense Série B: 2017
