= Waguinho Dias =

Brazilian footballer and coach

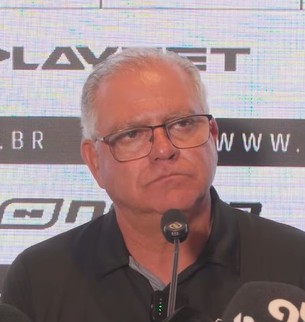
- Waguinho Dias in 2026

Personal information
- Full name: Wagner Santos de Souza Dias
- Date of birth: 23 July 1963 (age 63)
- Place of birth: Sumaré, Brazil
- Height: 1.80 m (5 ft 11 in)
- Position: Midfielder

Team information
- Current team: Serra Branca (head coach)

Youth career
- 1980–1982: Ponte Preta

Senior career*
Years	Team	Apps	(Gls)
1982–1987	Ponte Preta		
- → Rio Branco-SP (loan)
- → XV de Piracicaba (loan)
1987	Mogi Mirim		
1987	Hercílio Luz		
- Esportivo de Passos
- Bragantino
1990–1993	Rio Branco-SP		

Managerial career
- 1999–2000: União Barbarense U20
- 2001–2002: Guarani U20
- 2002–2003: Rio Branco-SP U20
- 2003: Rio Branco-SP
- 2004: Rio Branco-SP (assistant)
- 2006: Guarani
- 2006: Atlético Sorocaba
- 2006–2007: Guarani
- 2007: Sumaré
- 2008: Santa Rita
- 2008: Rio Branco-SP
- 2008: Portuguesa Santista
- 2008: Operário-MS
- 2008–2009: Sendas
- 2010: Guarani (interim)
- 2013–2014: Galícia
- 2014: União Barbarense
- 2015: Velo Clube
- 2015: União Barbarense
- 2016: Inter de Lages
- 2017–2018: Atlético Tubarão
- 2018–2019: Marcílio Dias
- 2019: Brusque
- 2019: Criciúma
- 2020: América de Natal
- 2020: Penapolense
- 2020–2021: Marcílio Dias
- 2021: Uberlândia
- 2021–2022: Brusque
- 2023: Ipatinga
- 2023–2024: Marcílio Dias
- 2024: Treze
- 2025: Confiança
- 2025: Marcílio Dias
- 2025–2026: Figueirense
- 2026: Inter de Limeira
- 2026: ABC
- 2026–: Serra Branca
- * Club domestic league appearances and goals

Wagner Santos de Souza Dias (born 23 July 1973), known as Waguinho Dias or simply Waguinho, is a Brazilian football coach and former player who played as a midfielder. He is the current head coach of Serra Branca.

== Career ==
Born in Sumaré, São Paulo, Waguinho was a Ponte Preta youth graduate, playing for three years in the first team squad before moving out on loan to several sides. In 1987, he was sold to Mogi Mirim, and retired at the age of 30 in 1993 with Rio Branco-SP.

After retiring, Waguinho started working as a coach, his first being the under-20 side of União Barbarense in 1999. After being in charge of the under-20 teams of Guarani and Rio Branco, he was named head coach of the latter's first team for the 2003 campaign.

Waguinho was an assistant of Rio Branco in 2004, and later returned to Guarani as a technical coordinator. In April 2006, he was named head coach of the main squad in the place of Toninho Cerezo, but was sacked on 8 June after the club's president changed.

On 1 October 2006, after a brief period at Atlético Sorocaba, Waguinho returned to Bugre after Luiz Carlos Barbieri was sacked, but was unable to avoid relegation from the Série B. He was again dismissed the following 25 February, and worked for a brief period at Sumaré before taking over Santa Rita on 20 November 2007.

In February 2008, Waguinho returned to his native state after being appointed head coach of Rio Branco-SP. In that season, he was also in charge of Portuguesa Santista, Operário-MS and Sendas.

In 2010, Waguinho returned to Guarani, again as a technical coordinator, and worked as an interim head coach once. He returned to coaching duties on 19 September 2013, after being named at the helm of Galícia.

In 2014, Waguinho took over União Barbarense, and managed to save the club from relegation in the Campeonato Paulista Série A2. On 7 October of that year, he was appointed Velo Clube head coach for the ensuing campaign, but returned to Barbarense the following 19 February.

On 16 November 2015, Waguinho was appointed in charge of Inter de Lages for the 2016 season. He avoided relegation from the Campeonato Catarinense with the side, and was named head coach of Atlético Tubarão on 13 February 2017.

Waguinho led Tubarão to the 2017 Copa Santa Catarina title, and was named in charge of Marcílio Dias on 10 July 2018. Ahead of the 2019 Campeonato Brasileiro Série D, he was presented as head coach of Brusque, and led the club to a first-ever title and promotion.

On 27 August 2019, Waguinho left Brusque and took over Criciúma in the second division. He was dismissed on 26 September after only five matches (two draws and three defeats), and was named in charge of América de Natal on 2 October.

On 3 February 2020, despite having six wins in nine matches, Waguinho was relieved of his duties at América. In the campaign, he also worked at Penapolense (where he left after suffering relegation in the Paulista A2) and Marcílio Dias.

Waguinho left Marcílio on 3 February 2021, after failing to agree new terms, and took over Uberlândia on 17 March. Sacked on 18 June, he returned to Brusque on 12 September, in the place of longtime incumbent Jerson Testoni.

Waguinho won the 2022 Campeonato Catarinense, but was sacked on 15 May 2022, after a poor start in the league. On 22 November, he agreed to take over Ipatinga, and returned to Marcílio Dias the following 28 June.

Waguinho departed Marcílio on 20 March 2024, and had a short stint at Treze before being named head coach of Confiança on 23 September. Despite winning the 2025 Campeonato Sergipano, he was sacked on 28 April of that year, and returned to Marcílio Dias the following day.

On 2 October 2025, Waguinho was announced as head coach of Figueirense. He won the year's Copa Santa Catarina, but was dismissed the following 22 January.

On 26 January 2026, Waguinho was appointed in charge of Inter de Limeira also in the third division. On 9 March, after being knocked out in the first stage of the Campeonato Paulista Série A2, he was sacked, and was presented at ABC late in the month.

On 1 September 2026, Waguinho left ABC after failing to agree new terms, and took over Serra Branca three days later.

== Honours ==
=== Coach ===
Atlético Tubarão

- Copa Santa Catarina: 2017

Brusque

- Campeonato Brasileiro Série D: 2019
- Campeonato Catarinense: 2022

Confiança

- Campeonato Sergipano: 2025

Figueirense

- Copa Santa Catarina: 2025
