= Diego Jardel =

Brazilian footballer (born 1989)

Personal information
- Full name: Diego Jardel Koester
- Date of birth: 26 December 1989 (age 36)
- Place of birth: Águas Mornas, Brazil
- Height: 1.80 m (5 ft 11 in)
- Position: Attacking midfielder

Team information
- Current team: Londrina

Youth career
- 2005–2006: Figueirense
- 2007–2009: Camboriú

Senior career*
Years	Team	Apps	(Gls)
2009–2011	União Leiria	0	(0)
2009–2010	→ Arouca (loan)	5	(0)
2012–2013	Camboriú	20	(3)
2012	→ Marcílio Dias (loan)		
2012	→ Imbituba (loan)		
2013–2017	Avaí	121	(10)
2015	→ Botafogo (loan)	34	(4)
2017–2019	Al-Arabi	44	(8)
2019–2020	Al Dhafra	24	(3)
2020–2021	Cuiabá	10	(1)
2021	Ajman	7	(3)
2022–2023	Brusque	32	(7)
2023–	Londrina	18	(1)
- * Club domestic league appearances and goals as of 6 September 2023

Diego Jardel Koester (born 26 December 1989), known as Diego Jardel, is a Brazilian footballer who plays as an attacking midfielder for Londrina.

== Playing career ==
After playing with Camboriú, Jardel joined Avaí in 2013. He played over 50 times for Avaí, including 45 times in the Campeonato Brasileiro Série B. Before the start of the 2015 season, Jardel negotiated a season-long loan with newly relegated Botafogo de Futebol e Regatas. Jardel has returned to Avaí after the end of loan term since 31 December 2015.

On 12 January 2022, he returned to Brazil and joined Brusque-SC.
