= Zé Vitor (footballer, born 1998) =

Brazilian footballer

Personal information
- Full name: José Vitor dos Santos Silva
- Date of birth: 4 November 1998 (age 27)
- Place of birth: Paulo Afonso, Brazil
- Height: 1.82 m (6 ft 0 in)
- Position: Forward

Team information
- Current team: Nanjing City
- Number: 9

Senior career*
Years	Team	Apps	(Gls)
2017	Estanciano	3	(1)
2018–2020	Atlético Tubarão	20	(6)
2019	→ IK Frej (loan)	19	(5)
2020–2022	Marcílio Dias	50	(14)
2021	→ Ituano (loan)	10	(1)
2022–2023	Vasco da Gama	5	(0)
2023	→ Feirense (loan)	13	(2)
2023	→ Londrina (loan)	12	(0)
2024	Ypiranga-RS	34	(12)
2025	Boavista-RJ	13	(5)
2025–2026	CSKA 1948	3	(0)
2026–	Nanjing City	0	(0)
- * Club domestic league appearances and goals as of 00:53, 9 March 2026 (UTC)

José Vitor dos Santos Silva (born 4 November 1998), simply known as Zé Vítor, is a Brazilian professional footballer who plays as a forward for China League One club Nanjing City.

== Career ==
Zé Vitor began his career at Estanciano in 2017. He became famous playing for the Santa Catarina teams of Atlético Tubarão and Marcílio Dias, where he scored 9 goals in 12 matches in the 2022 Campeonato Catarinense, which attracted the attention of Vasco da Gama. After playing in the 2023 season for Londrina on loan, he arrived in 2024 at Ypiranga-RS, where he once again stood out, scoring 12 goals in 34 games.

In the 2025 season, he played in the Campeonato Carioca for Boavista SC and in April he left for CSKA 1948 in Bulgarian football. He was released by the club at the end of the year.

== Honours ==
Ituano

- Campeonato Brasileiro Série C: 2021
