= Rômulo (footballer, born 2001) =

Brazilian footballer

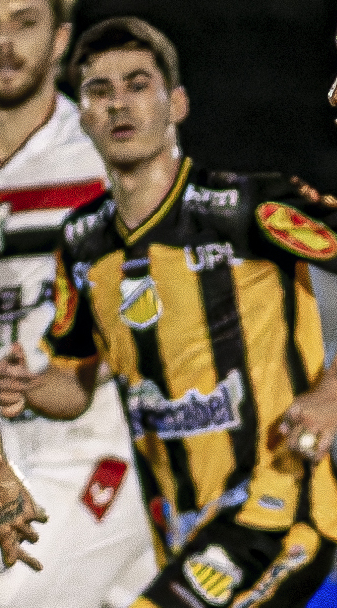
- Rômulo playing for Novorizontino in 2023

Personal information
- Full name: Rômulo Azevedo Simão
- Date of birth: 7 October 2001 (age 25)
- Place of birth: Pirassununga, Brazil
- Height: 1.77 m (5 ft 10 in)
- Positions: Attacking midfielder; forward

Team information
- Current team: Novorizontino (on loan from Palmeiras)
- Number: 10

Youth career
- 2013–2014: União São João
- 2017: Independente de Limeira
- 2018–2019: Matonense
- 2018–2019: → Atlético Paranaense (loan)
- 2019–2020: Novorizontino

Senior career*
Years	Team	Apps	(Gls)
2019	Matonense	11	(2)
2020–2024	Novorizontino	98	(15)
2024–	Palmeiras	13	(0)
2025	→ Ceará (loan)	14	(0)
2025–	→ Novorizontino (loan)	63	(19)
- * Club domestic league appearances and goals as of 17 November 2026

Rômulo Azevedo Simão (born 7 October 2001), simply known as Rômulo, is a Brazilian footballer who plays as either an attacking midfielder or a forward for Novorizontino, on loan from Palmeiras.

== Career ==
=== Early career ===
Born in Pirassununga, São Paulo, Rômulo represented União São João, Independente de Limeira and Matonense as a youth before being loaned out to Atlético Paranaense in September 2018. Back to Matonense in March 2019, he made his first team debut during the year's Campeonato Paulista Segunda Divisão before leaving the club in August for Novorizontino, after having unpaid wages.

=== Novorizontino ===
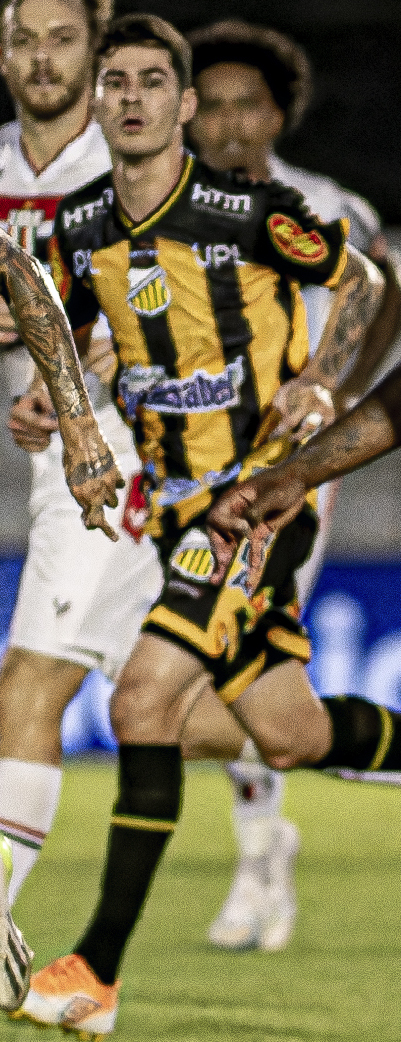
Rômulo playing for Novorizontino in 2023

Initially a member of the under-20 squad, Rômulo was promoted to the first team of Tigre in 2020, and started to feature with the squad in the year's Copa Paulista. He only started to feature regularly in the 2022 Série B, however, and renewed his contract until 2025 on 19 September 2022.

Rômulo became a regular starter during the 2023 season, contributing with 11 goals and nine assists during the year.

=== Palmeiras ===
On 20 February 2024, Palmeiras announced the signing of Rômulo on a five-year contract, with the player joining the club after the 2024 Campeonato Paulista. He made his club – and Série A – debut on 17 April, coiming on as a late substitute for Raphael Veiga in a 1–0 home loss to Internacional, but was unable to establish himself in the starting eleven under head coach Abel Ferreira.

==== Loan to Ceará ====
On 7 February 2025, Rômulo was loaned to Ceará until the end of the year. Initially a regular member, he lost space in June.

==== Loan to Novorizontino ====
On 1 August 2025, Rômulo returned to Novorizontino on loan until the end of the year. On 24 December, his loan was extended for a further season.

== Career statistics ==
As of 17 November 2026

Club	Season	League			State League		Cup		Continental		Other		Total	
Club	Season	Division	Apps	Goals	Apps	Goals	Apps	Goals	Apps	Goals	Apps	Goals	Apps	Goals
Matonense	2019	Paulista 2ª Divisão	—		11	2	—		—		—		11	2
Novorizontino	2020	Série D	0	0	—		0	0	—		8 (Note: Appearance(s) in Copa Paulista)	3	8	3
Novorizontino	2021	Série C	9	0	0	0	—		—		—		9	0
Novorizontino	2022	Série B	20	1	5	0	1	0	—		—		26	1
Novorizontino	2023	Série B	32	7	19	4	—		—		—		51	11
Novorizontino	2024	Série B	0	0	13	3	—		—		—		13	3
Novorizontino	Total		61	8	37	7	1	0	—		8	3	107	18
Palmeiras	2024	Série A	9	0	—		1	0	2 (Note: Appearance(s) in Copa Libertadores)	0	—		12	0
Palmeiras	2025	Série A	0	0	4	0	0	0	0	0	—		4	0
Palmeiras	Total		9	0	4	0	1	0	2	0	—		16	0
Ceará (loan)	2025	Série A	9	0	5	0	2	0	—		5 (Note: Appearance(s) in Copa do Nordeste)	0	21	0
Novorizontino (loan)	2025	Série B	16	2	—		—		—		—		16	2
Novorizontino (loan)	2026	Série B	38	12	9	5	3	1	—		0	0	50	18
Novorizontino (loan)	Total		54	14	9	5	3	1	—		0	0	66	20
Career total			133	22	66	14	7	1	2	0	13	3	221	40

== Honours ==
=== Clubs ===
Ceará

- Campeonato Cearense: 2025

Novorizontino

- Campeonato Brasileiro Série B: 2026

=== Individual ===
- Campeonato Paulista Breakthrough Player: 2024
- Campeonato Paulista Team of the Year: 2024, 2026
