= Alejandro Martínez (Argentine footballer) =

Argentine footballer (born 1997)

Personal information
- Full name: Silvio Alejandro Martínez
- Date of birth: 16 April 1997 (age 29)
- Place of birth: González Catán, Argentina
- Height: 1.71 m (5 ft 7 in)
- Position: Winger

Team information
- Current team: Huracán (on loan from Talleres)
- Number: 14

Youth career
- Atlas

Senior career*
| Years | Team | Apps | (Gls) |
| 2017–2019 | Atlas | 65 | (11) |
| 2019–2020 | Sportivo Barracas | 18 | (2) |
| 2020–2021 | Argentino de Merlo | 7 | (0) |
| 2021 | Defensores de Belgrano | 16 | (5) |
| 2021 | → Central Córdoba (loan) | 24 | (3) |
| 2022 | Central Córdoba | 38 | (8) |
| 2023–2024 | Tijuana | 31 | (3) |
| 2024– | Talleres | 25 | (3) |
| 2025 | → Ceará (loan) | 4 | (0) |
| 2025 | → Cuiabá (loan) | 17 | (2) |
| 2026– | → Huracán (loan) | 10 | (0) |
- * Club domestic league appearances and goals as of 17:35, 6 July 2026 (UTC)

Silvio Alejandro Martínez (born 12 July 1997) is an Argentine footballer who plays mainly as a left winger for Huracán, on loan from Talleres de Córdoba.

== Career ==
Born in González Catán, Buenos Aires, Martínez began his career with local side Club Atlético Atlas in the Primera D Metropolitana in 2017. In 2019, he moved to fellow league team Sportivo Barracas.

On 24 July 2020, Primera C Metropolitana side Argentino de Merlo announced the signing of Martínez. The following 5 February, he moved straight to Primera Nacional, signing for Defensores de Belgrano.

On 15 July 2021, Martínez was loaned to Primera División side Central Córdoba. The following 18 March, the club bought 50% of his economic rights, signing him permanently.

On 7 January 2023, after scoring eight goals for Central Córdoba, Martínez moved abroad and joined Liga MX side Tijuana. On 7 February of the following year, he returned to his home country after signing for Talleres de Córdoba.

On 2 February 2025, Ceará announced the signing of Martínez on a one-year loan deal from Talleres.

== Career statistics ==
As of 27 January 2025.

| Club | Season | League | | | Cup | | Continental | | Other | | Total | |
| Club | Season | Division | Apps | Goals | Apps | Goals | Apps | Goals | Apps | Goals | Apps | Goals |
|---|---|---|---|---|---|---|---|---|---|---|---|---|
| Atlas | 2017–18 | Primera D Metropolitana | ? | ? | 1 | 0 | — | | — | | ? | ? |
| Atlas | 2018–19 | Primera D Metropolitana | ? | ? | 1 | 0 | — | | — | | ? | ? |
| Atlas | Total | | 65 | 11 | 2 | 0 | — | | — | | 67 | 11 |
| Sportivo Barracas | 2019–20 | Primera D Metropolitana | 18 | 2 | 1 | 0 | — | | — | | 19 | 2 |
| Argentino de Merlo | 2020 | Primera C Metropolitana | 7 | 0 | — | | — | | — | | 7 | 0 |
| Defensores de Belgrano | 2021 | Primera Nacional | 16 | 5 | 1 | 0 | — | | — | | 17 | 5 |
| Central Córdoba | 2021 | Primera División | 24 | 3 | — | | — | | — | | 24 | 3 |
| Central Córdoba | 2022 | Primera División | 38 (Note: Soccerway counts Copa de la Liga Profesional appearances as league appearances.) | 8 | 1 | 0 | — | | — | | 39 | 8 |
| Central Córdoba | Total | | 62 | 11 | 1 | 0 | — | | — | | 63 | 11 |
| Tijuana | 2022–23 | Liga MX | 14 | 1 | — | | — | | — | | 14 | 1 |
| Tijuana | 2023–24 | Liga MX | 17 | 2 | — | | — | | 1 (Note: Appearance(s) in Leagues Cup) | 0 | 18 | 2 |
| Tijuana | Total | | 31 | 3 | — | | — | | 1 | 0 | 32 | 3 |
| Talleres | 2024 | Primera División | 25 | 3 | 3 | 1 | 3 (Note: Appearance(s) in Copa Libertadores) | 0 | — | | 31 | 4 |
| Talleres | 2025 | Primera División | 0 | 0 | 0 | 0 | 0 | 0 | — | | 0 | 0 |
| Talleres | Total | | 25 | 3 | 3 | 1 | 3 | 0 | — | | 31 | 4 |
| Ceará (loan) | 2025 | Série A | 2 | 0 | 2 | 0 | — | | 5 | 0 | 9 | 0 |
| Cuiabá (loan) | 2025 | Série B | 0 | 0 | 0 | 0 | — | | 0 | 0 | 0 | 0 |
| Career total | | | 226 | 35 | 10 | 1 | 3 | 0 | 6 | 0 | 245 | 36 |

== Honours ==
=== Clubs ===
Ceará

- Campeonato Cearense: 2025
