= Airton (footballer, born 1989) =

Brazilian footballer

Personal information
- Full name: Airton Santos de Oliveira
- Date of birth: 8 February 1989 (age 37)
- Place of birth: Santa Rosa de Lima, Brazil
- Height: 1.74 m (5 ft 9 in)
- Position: Left-back

Team information
- Current team: Confiança

Youth career
- 2007: Porto-PE
- 2008: Benfica (U19)

Senior career*
Years	Team	Apps	(Gls)
2008	Sport Recife		
2009–2012	Porto-PE		
2010	→ América-RN (loan)		
2010	→ Central (loan)		
2011	→ Náutico (loan)		
2012–2013	ABC		
2013–2014	Boa Esporte		
2013	→ Sampaio Corrêa (loan)		
2014	→ Paysandu (loan)		
2015	Nacional-AM		
2015	Capivariano		
2015	Botafogo-PB		
2016	Sergipe		
2016	Juazeirense		
2016	Paraíba de Cajazeiras		
2017	ASA		
2017	Porto-PE		
2018	Cabofriense		
2018	Uberlândia		
2018	Novo Horizonte-GO		
2018–2023	Brusque	222	(6)
2024	São Luiz		
2024	Marcílio Dias		
2024	Treze		
2025–	Confiança		
- * Club domestic league appearances and goals as of 24 October 2025

Airton Santos de Oliveira (born 8 February 1989), simply known as Airton, is a Brazilian professional footballer who plays as a left-back for Confiança.

== Career ==
Airton competed in the Copa São Paulo de Futebol Jr. for Porto de Caruaru. He caught the attention of SL Benfica where he played for the under-19 team. He returned to Brazil with Sport, and played for other teams such as Náutico, Sampaio Corrêa, ABC, América-RN, Sergipe, ASA and Paysandu.

For Brusque, Airton played from October 2018 to 2023, and won six titles, played 222 matches and scored 6 goals.

In December 2023, he was announced as a reinforcement of EC São Luiz. On 2024 season also played for Marcílio Dias and Treze. For the 2025 season, Aírton signed with AD Confiança.

== Honours ==
Sergipe

- Campeonato Sergipano: 2016

Brusque

- Campeonato Brasileiro Série D: 2019
- Copa Santa Catarina: 2018, 2019
- Campeonato Catarinense: 2022
- Recopa Catarinense: 2020, 2023

Confiança

- Campeonato Sergipano: 2025
