= Mota (footballer, born 1985) =

Brazilian footballer

Personal information
- Full name: Willis Mota Moreira
- Date of birth: 23 March 1985 (age 41)
- Place of birth: Feira de Santana, Brazil
- Height: 1.96 m (6 ft 5 in)
- Position: Goalkeeper

Team information
- Current team: Mixto

Senior career*
Years	Team	Apps	(Gls)
2007–2008	Paraíba do Sul		
2008	Náutico-RR		
2009	CFZ-RJ		
2010	Fênix-RJ		
2011	America-RJ		
2012	Barra Mansa		
2012–2016	Volta Redonda		
2014–2015	→ São Cristóvão (loan)		
2017–2018	CSA		
2019	Paysandu		
2020	XV de Piracicaba		
2020–2021	Sampaio Corrêa		
2022	Jacuipense		
2023	Portuguesa-RJ		
2023	Botafogo-PB		
2024	Madureira		
2024	Nova Iguaçu		
2025	Madureira		
2025–	Mixto		
- * Club domestic league appearances and goals as of 10 September 2025

Willis Mota Moreira (born 23 March 1985), simply known as Mota, is a Brazilian professional footballer who plays as a goalkeeper for Mixto.

== Career ==
Born in Feira de Santana, Bahia, Mota played most of his career in teams in the state of Rio de Janeiro. In 2016, he was champion of Série D with Volta Redonda. In 2017, he again won a national title, Series C with CSA, a team with which he created a deeper bond. He also stood out playing for Sampaio Corrêa, where he was state champion, Paysandu, Botafogo-PB and Madureira. His last club was Nova Iguaçu FC in the 2024 Campeonato Brasileiro Série D.

In 2025 Mota defended Madureira again, and later stood out at Mixto, being a hero in the classification against Portuguesa in 2025 Campeonato Brasileiro Série D.

== Honours ==
Volta Redonda

- Campeonato Brasileiro Série D: 2016

CSA

- Campeonato Brasileiro Série C: 2017
- Campeonato Alagoano: 2018

Sampaio Corrêa

- Campeonato Maranhense: 2021

== Personal life ==
Mota and his father, Mario Mota, have a social project in the city of Maceió with legal assistance and a football school.
