= Tubarão Futebol Clube =

Association football club in Brazil

Tubarão
- Full name: Tubarão Futebol Clube
- Nickname(s): Peixe; Peixão; Tricolor
- Founded: May 30, 1992; 33 years ago
- Dissolved: 2005
- Ground: Estádio Aníbal Torres Costa, Tubarão, Santa Catarina state, Brazil
- Capacity: 15,000
- President: Amauri de Oliveira
Home colours	Away colours

Tubarão Futebol Clube, commonly known as Tubarão, is a Brazilian football club based in Tubarão, Santa Catarina state. They competed in the Série C three times.

== History ==
The club was founded on May 25, 1992. Tubarão won the Copa Santa Catarina in 1998. They competed in the Série C in 1997, in 1998 and in 2002, they were eliminated in the First Stage in the three seasons.

== Honours ==
=== Official tournaments ===
State
Competitions	Titles	Seasons
Copa Santa Catarina	1	1998

=== Others tournaments ===
==== State ====
- Taça Governador do Estado (1): 1996

=== Runners-up ===
- Campeonato Catarinense (2): 1997, 1998

== Stadium ==
Tubarão Futebol Clube play their home games at Estádio Aníbal Torres Costa. The stadium has a maximum capacity of 15,000 people.
