= Antonio Galeano =

Paraguayan footballer (born 2000)

Personal information
- Full name: Antonio Javier Galeano Ferreira
- Date of birth: 22 March 2000 (age 26)
- Place of birth: Asunción, Paraguay
- Height: 1.70 m (5 ft 7 in)
- Position: Forward

Team information
- Current team: Remo
- Number: 21

Youth career
- Rubio Ñu
- 2019–2020: → São Paulo (loan)

Senior career*
| Years | Team | Apps | (Gls) |
| 2016–2021 | Rubio Ñu | 26 | (0) |
| 2020–2021 | → São Paulo (loan) | 24 | (1) |
| 2022–2025 | Cerro Porteño | 35 | (6) |
| 2023–2024 | → Nacional (loan) | 42 | (8) |
| 2025 | → Ceará (loan) | 46 | (7) |
| 2026 | Mirassol | 17 | (0) |
| 2026– | Remo | 1 | (0) |

International career^{‡}
| 2017 | Paraguay U17 | 10 | (3) |
| 2019 | Paraguay U20 | 3 | (0) |
- * Club domestic league appearances and goals as of 17 August 2026 ‡ National team caps and goals as of 22 January 2019

Antonio Javier Galeano Ferreira (born 22 March 2000), commonly known as Antonio Galeano or simply Galeano, is a Paraguayan professional footballer who plays as forward for Brazilian club Remo.

== Honours ==
São Paulo

- Campeonato Paulista: 2021

Ceará

- Campeonato Cearense: 2025
