= Barcelona Futebol Clube =

Barcelona
- Full name: Barcelona Futebol Clube
- Nicknames: Barça; Onça
- Founded: 17 September 2019; 6 years ago
- Stadium: Mário Pessoa
- Capacity: 10,000
- League: Campeonato Baiano
- 2025 2025: Série D, 56th of 64; Baiano, 8th of 10
Home colours	Away colours

Barcelona Futebol Clube (officially Ilhéus Soccer Futebol Entretenimento S/A) is a football club based in Ilhéus, in the state of Bahia, Brazil. The club was founded on 17 September 2019. The team joined the Bahia Football Federation on 22 October 2019.

== History ==
Barcelona made their professional debut in the Second Division of the Bahian Championship in 2020, occupying fifth place and missing out on the final stage. In August 2021, Barcelona became champions of the Bahian Second Division, beating Botafogo Bonfinense 3–0, after losing the first leg 2–1 in Senhor do Bonfim thus guaranteeing the only access place for the 2022 Baiano First Division.

== Honours ==
- Campeonato Baiano Second Division
  - Winners (1): 2021
