= Fernandinho (footballer, born July 1997) =

Brazilian footballer

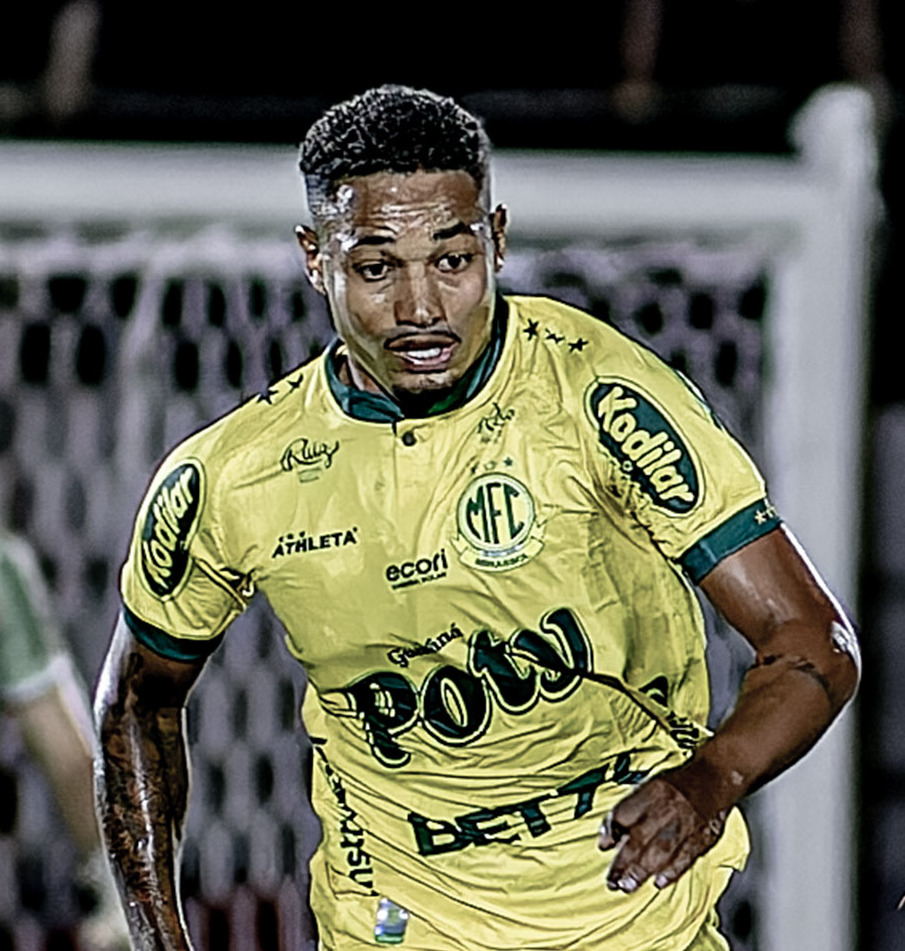
- Fernandinho playing for Mirassol in 2024

Personal information
- Full name: Fernando José Marques Maciel
- Date of birth: 19 July 1997 (age 29)
- Place of birth: São Luís, Brazil
- Height: 1.74 m (5 ft 9 in)
- Position: Forward

Team information
- Current team: Mirassol
- Number: 17

Youth career
- 2013–2016: Sampaio Corrêa
- 2014: → Santa Quitéria (loan)
- 2017–2018: Noroeste
- 2017: → Ponte Preta (loan)
- 2017–2018: → Internacional (loan)

Senior career*
Years	Team	Apps	(Gls)
2015–2017	Sampaio Corrêa	13	(1)
2017–2018	Noroeste	11	(1)
2018–2021	Bahia	3	(0)
2020	→ Joinville (loan)	9	(2)
2020–2021	→ Chapecoense (loan)	0	(0)
2021	Chapecoense	33	(2)
2021	→ Juárez (loan)	3	(0)
2022	Brusque	43	(6)
2022	Goiás	2	(0)
2023–2024	Mirassol	88	(7)
2025–2026	Ceará	51	(5)
2026–	Mirassol	0	(0)
- * Club domestic league appearances and goals as of 31 May 2026

Fernando José Marques Maciel (born 19 July 1997), commonly known as Fernandinho, is a Brazilian professional footballer who plays as a forward for Ceará.

== Club career ==
Born in São Luís, Maranhão, Fernandinho finished his formation with Sampaio Corrêa. He made his first team debut on 12 April 2015, coming on as a second-half substitute in a 0–0 Campeonato Maranhense home draw against Moto Club.

Fernandinho never established himself as a starter for the club, rescinded his contract in March 2017 and subsequently moved to Noroeste. After playing in the year's Campeonato Paulista Série A3, he moved on loan to Ponte Preta on 3 May, returning to the under-20 squad.

In September 2017, Fernandinho moved to Internacional on loan. He returned to his parent club the following March, but signed for Bahia on 29 May.

Fernandinho made his Bahia – and Série A – debut on 3 June 2018, replacing Júnior Brumado in a 0–2 home loss against Grêmio. His spell at the club was mainly associated to the under-23 squad, and on 13 December 2019, he was loaned to Joinville for the 2020 season.

On 3 June 2020, Fernandinho was announced at Chapecoense in the Série B, on loan for the remainder of the campaign. Shortly after arriving, he suffered a knee injury which sidelined him until January 2021.

On 17 February 2021, Fernandinho renewed with Chape until the end of the year.

== Career statistics ==
As of 7 May 2021

Club	Season	League			State League		Cup		Continental		Other		Total	
Club	Season	Division	Apps	Goals	Apps	Goals	Apps	Goals	Apps	Goals	Apps	Goals	Apps	Goals
Sampaio Corrêa	2015	Série B	0	0	1	0	0	0	—		0	0	1	0
Sampaio Corrêa	2016	Série B	7	1	3	0	0	0	—		0	0	10	1
Sampaio Corrêa	2017	Série C	0	0	2	0	0	0	—		1 (Note: Appearance(s) in Copa do Nordeste)	0	3	0
Sampaio Corrêa	Total		7	1	6	0	0	0	—		1	0	14	1
Noroeste	2017	Paulista A3	—		9	1	—		—		—		9	1
Noroeste	2018	Paulista A3	—		2	0	—		—		—		2	0
Noroeste	Total		—		11	1	—		—		—		11	1
Bahia	2018	Série A	2	0	—		—		—		—		2	0
Bahia	2019	Série A	0	0	1	0	0	0	—		0	0	1	0
Bahia	Total		2	0	1	0	0	0	—		0	0	3	0
Joinville (loan)	2020	Série D	0	0	9	2	—		—		—		9	2
Chapecoense	2020	Série B	0	0	—		—		—		—		0	0
Chapecoense	2021	Série A	0	0	12	1	0	0	—		1 (Note: Appearance(s) in Recopa Catarinense)	0	13	1
Chapecoense	Total		0	0	12	1	0	0	—		1	0	13	1
Career total			9	1	39	4	0	0	0	0	2	0	50	5

== Honours ==
=== Clubs ===
Bahia

- Campeonato Baiano: 2019

Joinville

- Copa Santa Catarina: 2020

Chapecoense

- Campeonato Catarinense: 2020

Brusque

- Campeonato Catarinense: 2022

Ceará

- Campeonato Cearense: 2025
