= Rodrigo Chagas =

Brazilian footballer

Personal information
- Full name: Rodrigo José Queiroz Chagas
- Date of birth: 19 March 1973 (age 53)
- Place of birth: Rio de Janeiro, Brazil
- Height: 1.72 m (5 ft 8 in)
- Positions: Defensive midfielder; right-back

Team information
- Current team: Vitória (assistant)

Youth career
- Bahia
- 1992: Vitória

Senior career*
Years	Team	Apps	(Gls)
1992–1995	Vitória		
1995–1996	Bayer Leverkusen	27	(1)
1996–1999	Corinthians	86	(1)
1999	Vitória	26	(0)
2000	Cruzeiro	34	(0)
2001	Sport Recife		
2001	Cruzeiro	9	(0)
2002	Ponte Preta	21	(0)
2002	Vitória	8	(0)
2003	Paysandu		
2004	CRB	5	(0)
2005	União São João	9	(0)

International career
1995	Brazil	3	(0)

Managerial career
- 2007: Ipitanga
- 2007–2009: Vitória U17
- 2009: Bahia U17
- 2010–2011: Bahia U20
- 2012: Jacuipense
- 2013: Ypiranga-BA
- 2014: Barras
- 2016: Juazeiro
- 2017–2019: Vitória U18
- 2019–2020: Vitória U20
- 2020: Vitória (interim)
- 2020–2021: Vitória
- 2022: Jacuipense
- 2023: Juazeirense
- 2023: Atlético Alagoinhas
- 2024: Monte Roraima
- 2025: Jacuipense
- 2025: Porto Vitória
- 2025: Vitória U20
- 2025: Vitória (interim)
- 2025: Vitória
- 2025–: Vitória (assistant)
- * Club domestic league appearances and goals

Rodrigo José Queiroz Chagas (born 19 March 1973 in Rio de Janeiro), known as Rodrigo Chagas or just Rodrigo, is a Brazilian football coach and former player who played as either a defensive midfielder or right-back. He is the current assistant coach of Vitória.

== Club career ==
Born in Rio de Janeiro, Rodrigo joined the youth sides of Vitória in 1992, and made his first team debut in the year's Campeonato Baiano shortly after. In the following year, he established himself as a regular starter, and was sold to Bayer Leverkusen in 1995 along with teammate Ramon Menezes.

Rodrigo returned to his home country in 1996, signing for Corinthians. He returned to Vitória in 1999 after winning two Campeonato Paulista titles, but moved to Cruzeiro in 2000.

Rodrigo spent the first half of the 2001 season at Sport Recife, before returning to Cruzeiro later in that year. In 2002, he represented Ponte Preta before rejoining Vitória for a third spell.

Rodrigo subsequently played for Paysandu, CRB and União São João, and had to retire in 2006 due to a car accident.

== International career ==
At international level, Rodrigo represented Brazil at the 1995 Copa América.

== Coaching career ==
Shortly after retiring, Chagas was appointed head coach of Ipitanga for the 2007 Baiano. He returned to Vitória later in that year as an under-17 coach, before moving to Bahia in the same role in 2009.

On 25 November 2021, after being in charge of Bahia's under-20 team, Chagas was named head coach of Jacuipense. He led the club to a promotion from the Campeonato Baiano Second Division, before being appointed at the helm of fellow league team Ypiranga-BA on 29 January 2013.

On 7 April 2014, Chagas was announced as Barras head coach. On 15 June 2016, after more than a year of inactivity, he took over Juazeiro.

On 16 January 2017, Chagas returned to Vitória as an under-18 coach. He was promoted to the under-20 squad in 2019, before becoming an interim head coach in November 2020, after the departure of Eduardo Barroca.

Back to his previous role after the appointment of Mazola Júnior, Chagas was definitely named head coach of the club on 22 December 2020, after Mazola was sacked. He was himself dismissed on 8 June 2021, and was given a holiday period before leaving the club permanently on 20 July.

In December 2021, Chagas returned to Jacuipense for the upcoming season. He left the club the following 10 November, and was announced at Juazeirense two days later.

Sacked on 1 February 2023, Chagas took over Atlético Alagoinhas fourteen days later, but was also dismissed on 15 May. On 21 December, he agreed to become Monte Roraima's first-ever head coach ahead of the 2024 campaign.

On 29 October 2024, Chagas returned to Jacuipense, but departed the club the following 15 February to take over Porto Vitória. Dismissed on 18 May 2025, he returned to Vitória on 14 July, as an under-20 coach. On 26 August, he was again an interim of the club, replacing sacked Fábio Carille.

On 3 September 2025, after a 1–0 win over Atlético Mineiro, Chagas was permanently named head coach of Vitória. On 24 September, however, after two defeats in as many matches, he was demoted to assistant coach, after the club appointed Jair Ventura as head coach.
