= Diego (footballer, born October 1995) =

Brazilian footballer

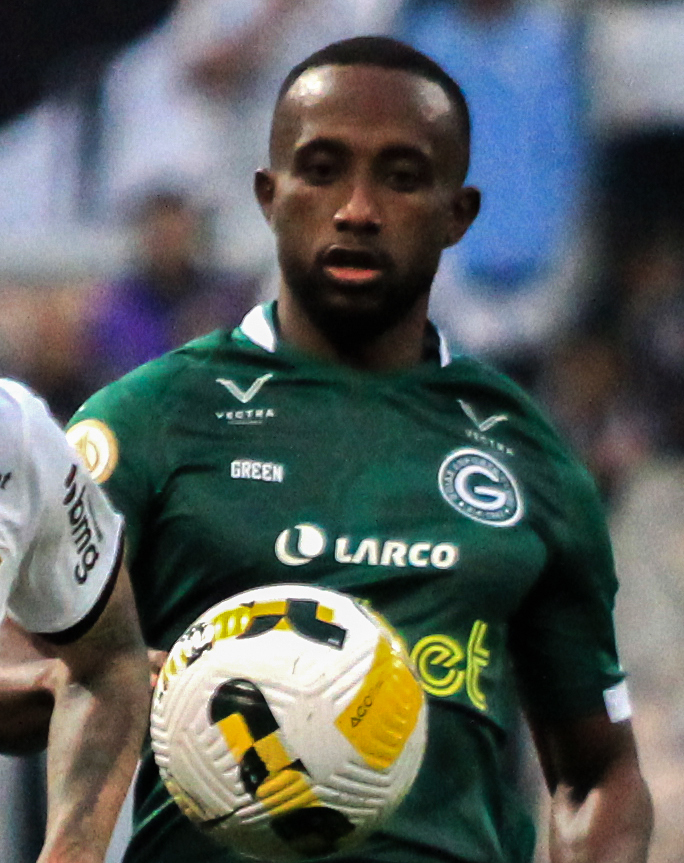
- Diego with Goiás in 2022

Personal information
- Full name: Jackson Diego Ibraim Fagundes
- Date of birth: 31 October 1995 (age 31)
- Place of birth: Macaé, Brazil
- Height: 1.75 m (5 ft 9 in)
- Positions: Right back; defensive midfielder

Team information
- Current team: Shimizu S-Pulse
- Number: 2

Senior career*
Years	Team	Apps	(Gls)
2017	Barcelona-RJ	20	(0)
2018–2020	Resende	22	(0)
2018	→ Friburguense (loan)	18	(4)
2019	→ Portuguesa-RJ (loan)	6	(0)
2019	→ Friburguense (loan)	17	(2)
2020–2021	Boa Esporte	24	(1)
2021–2024	Goiás	135	(5)
2025–2026	Ceará	49	(0)
2026–	Shimizu S-Pulse	0	(0)
- * Club domestic league appearances and goals as of 15 April 2026

Jackson Diego Ibraim Fagundes (born 31 October 1995), known as Dieguinho or just Diego, is a Brazilian footballer who plays for Shimizu S-Pulse. A versatile player, he primarily plays as either a right back or a defensive midfielder, but can also play as an attacking midfielder or a forward.

== Club career ==
=== Early career ===
Born in Macaé, Rio de Janeiro, Diego began his senior career with Barcelona-RJ in 2017. He joined Resende for the 2018 season, but after featuring rarely, he was loaned to Friburguense in April of that year.

Back to Resende, Diego again featured sparingly and moved on loan to Série D side Portuguesa-RJ on 13 April 2019. In July, he returned to Friburguense, also in a temporary deal.

On 13 July 2020, after playing in the 2020 Campeonato Carioca for Resende, Diego signed a permanent contract with Boa Esporte.

=== Goiás ===
On 12 May 2021, Diego agreed to a deal with Goiás in the Série B. He made his debut for the club on 1 June, starting in a 0–0 away draw against Sampaio Corrêa.

On 2 December 2021, after achieving promotion to the Série A as a starter, Diego renewed his contract until the end of 2023. He made his top tier debut on 10 April 2022, starting in a 3–0 away loss against Coritiba.

Diego scored his first goal in the main category of Brazilian football on 11 September 2022, netting the opener in a 1–1 home draw against Flamengo. On 27 October, he further extended his link until 2024.

Diego started the 2023 season sidelined, nursing a knee injury.

== Career statistics ==
As of 30 March 2023

Club	Season	League			State League		Cup		Continental		Other		Total	
Club	Season	Division	Apps	Goals	Apps	Goals	Apps	Goals	Apps	Goals	Apps	Goals	Apps	Goals
Barcelona-RJ	2017	Carioca Série B1	—		20	0	—		—		2 (Note: Appearance(s) in Copa Rio)	1	22	1
Resende	2018	Carioca	—		5	0	—		—		—		5	0
Resende	2019	Carioca	—		8	0	—		—		—		8	0
Resende	2020	Carioca	—		9	0	—		—		—		9	0
Resende	Total		—		22	0	—		—		—		22	0
Friburguense (loan)	2018	Carioca Série B1	—		18	4	—		—		8	1	26	5
Portuguesa-RJ (loan)	2019	Série D	6	0	—		—		—		—		6	0
Friburguense (loan)	2019	Carioca Série B1	—		17	2	—		—		—		17	2
Boa Esporte	2020	Série C	11	1	2	0	—		—		—		13	1
Boa Esporte	2021	Série D	0	0	11	0	—		—		—		11	0
Boa Esporte	Total		11	1	13	0	—		—		—		24	1
Goiás	2021	Série B	32	0	—		—		—		—		32	0
Goiás	2022	Série A	34	2	12	0	6	0	—		—		52	2
Goiás	2023	Série A	0	0	0	0	0	0	0	0	0	0	0	0
Goiás	Total		66	2	12	0	6	0	0	0	0	0	84	2
Career total			83	3	102	6	6	0	0	0	10	2	201	11

== Honours ==
Friburguense

- Campeonato Carioca Série B1: 2019

Ceará

- Campeonato Cearense: 2025
