= Jefferson Maranhão (footballer, born 1989) =

Brazilian footballer

Personal information
- Full name: Jefferson Viana Correa
- Date of birth: 10 June 1989 (age 37)
- Place of birth: São Luís, Brazil
- Height: 1.78 m (5 ft 10 in)
- Position: Midfielder

Team information
- Current team: Sertãozinho

Senior career*
| Years | Team | Apps | (Gls) |
| 2007–2009 | Palmeiras B | | |
| 2009 | Moto Club | | |
| 2010 | IAPE | | |
| 2010 | → Ituano (loan) | | |
| 2011 | Ituano | | |
| 2011–2015 | Avaí | | |
| 2011 | → Paraná (loan) | | |
| 2012 | → Mogi Mirim (loan) | | |
| 2013 | → Brasiliense (loan) | | |
| 2014 | → Atlético Sorocaba (loan) | | |
| 2014 | → CRB (loan) | | |
| 2015 | → Mirassol (loan) | | |
| 2015–2016 | Linense | | |
| 2017 | Madureira | | |
| 2017– | Sertãozinho | | |
- * Club domestic league appearances and goals as of 19 March 2017

Jefferson Viana Correa (born June 10, 1989 in São Luís), known as Jefferson Maranhão, is a Brazilian footballer who plays for Sertãozinho as midfielder.

== Career statistics ==
As of 19 March 2017

| Club | Season | League | | | State League | | Cup | | Conmebol | | Other | | Total | |
| Club | Season | Division | Apps | Goals | Apps | Goals | Apps | Goals | Apps | Goals | Apps | Goals | Apps | Goals |
|---|---|---|---|---|---|---|---|---|---|---|---|---|---|---|
| Ituano | 2011 | Paulista | — | | 7 | 2 | — | | — | | — | | 7 | 2 |
| Paraná | 2011 | Série B | 26 | 4 | — | | — | | — | | — | | 26 | 4 |
| Mogi Mirim | 2012 | Série D | — | | 14 | 0 | — | | — | | — | | 14 | 0 |
| Avaí | 2012 | Série B | 16 | 1 | — | | — | | — | | — | | 16 | 1 |
| Avaí | 2013 | Série B | 3 | 0 | 11 | 1 | — | | — | | — | | 14 | 1 |
| Avaí | Subtotal | | 19 | 1 | 11 | 1 | — | | — | | — | | 30 | 2 |
| Brasiliense | 2013 | Série C | 13 | 2 | — | | — | | — | | — | | 13 | 2 |
| Atlético Sorocaba | 2014 | Paulista | — | | 2 | 0 | — | | — | | — | | 2 | 0 |
| CRB | 2014 | Série C | 11 | 1 | 2 | 0 | — | | — | | — | | 13 | 1 |
| Mirassol | 2015 | Paulista A2 | — | | 17 | 1 | — | | — | | — | | 17 | 1 |
| Linense | 2015 | Paulista | — | | — | | — | | — | | 2 (Note: All appearance(s) in Copa Paulista) | 0 | 2 | 0 |
| Linense | 2016 | Série D | 5 | 1 | — | | — | | — | | — | | 5 | 1 |
| Linense | Subtotal | | 5 | 1 | — | | — | | — | | 2 | 0 | 7 | 1 |
| Madureira | 2017 | Carioca | — | | 3 | 1 | — | | — | | — | | 3 | 1 |
| Sertãozinho | 2017 | Paulista A2 | — | | 1 | 0 | — | | — | | — | | 1 | 0 |
| Career total | | | 74 | 9 | 57 | 5 | 0 | 0 | 0 | 0 | 2 | 0 | 133 | 14 |
