= Camboriú =

Camboriú Municipality of Camboriú Município de Camboriú
- Municipality
- Flag Coat of arms
- Motto: A beautiful city by nature Uma cidade bonita por natureza
- Location in Camboriú, Santa Catarina

- Location in Brazil
- Coordinates: 27°01′30″S 48°39′14″W
- Country: Brazil
- Region: South
- State: Santa Catarina
- Mesoregion: Vale do Itajai
- Established: April 5, 1884

Government
  - Mayor: Leonel Pavan (PSD)

Area
  - Total: 214.5 km^{2} (82.8 sq mi)
- Elevation: 8 m (26 ft)

Population (2022 Census)
  - Total: 103,074
  - Estimate (2025): 117,324
- Time zone: UTC-3 (BRT)
  - Summer (DST): UTC-2 (BRST)
- Demonym: camboriuense

Camboriú is a municipality in the state of Santa Catarina in the South region of Brazil. It is near Balneario Camboriu, a popular beach destination.

== Toponym ==
The toponym "Camboriú" is a reference to the Camboriú River. The name originates from the Tupi language, meaning "river of the common snook", from kamuri (snook) and 'y (river). Another hypothesis is that the indigenous origin was inspired by the relief of the Pedra Branca, a hill that resembles a female breast and is visible from several points in the municipality. According to Patrianova, in Pequeno Livro, Cambu means "to nurse", and Ryry, Ruru or Riú means nursing container, i.e. breast.

== Climate ==
Climate data for Camboriú (1976–2005)
Month	Jan	Feb	Mar	Apr	May	Jun	Jul	Aug	Sep	Oct	Nov	Dec	Year
Record high °C (°F)	39.5 (103.1)	39.2 (102.6)	38.4 (101.1)	35.0 (95.0)	35.0 (95.0)	31.2 (88.2)	32.7 (90.9)	34.0 (93.2)	34.6 (94.3)	31.8 (89.2)	36.0 (96.8)	38.2 (100.8)	39.5 (103.1)
Mean daily maximum °C (°F)	28.7 (83.7)	28.9 (84.0)	28.3 (82.9)	26.1 (79.0)	23.9 (75.0)	22.0 (71.6)	21.2 (70.2)	21.5 (70.7)	22.1 (71.8)	23.4 (74.1)	25.3 (77.5)	27.3 (81.1)	24.9 (76.8)
Daily mean °C (°F)	23.5 (74.3)	23.8 (74.8)	23.1 (73.6)	20.6 (69.1)	17.9 (64.2)	16.0 (60.8)	15.0 (59.0)	15.7 (60.3)	17.0 (62.6)	18.8 (65.8)	20.5 (68.9)	22.3 (72.1)	19.5 (67.1)
Mean daily minimum °C (°F)	19.4 (66.9)	19.7 (67.5)	18.8 (65.8)	16.0 (60.8)	13.1 (55.6)	11.2 (52.2)	10.2 (50.4)	11.1 (52.0)	13.2 (55.8)	15.0 (59.0)	16.4 (61.5)	18.1 (64.6)	15.2 (59.3)
Record low °C (°F)	9.4 (48.9)	9.9 (49.8)	7.4 (45.3)	2.0 (35.6)	1.2 (34.2)	−0.3 (31.5)	−2.6 (27.3)	−1.2 (29.8)	1.0 (33.8)	2.2 (36.0)	6.2 (43.2)	8.6 (47.5)	−2.6 (27.3)
Average precipitation mm (inches)	231.0 (9.09)	203.0 (7.99)	161.0 (6.34)	107.0 (4.21)	122.0 (4.80)	113.0 (4.45)	101.0 (3.98)	102.0 (4.02)	160.0 (6.30)	156.0 (6.14)	150.0 (5.91)	156.0 (6.14)	1,762 (69.37)
Average relative humidity (%)	85	86	87	87	88	88	88	88	88	86	85	84	87
Mean monthly sunshine hours	143	135	133	134	150	127	126	97	80	106	128	146	1,505
Source 1: Empresa Brasileira de Pesquisa Agropecuária (EMBRAPA)
Source 2: Climatempo (precipitation)

== See also ==
- List of municipalities in Santa Catarina
