= Camboriú Futebol Clube =

Camboriú
- Full name: Camboriú Futebol Clube
- Nicknames: Cambura; Terror da Baixada; Tricolor Camboriuense
- Founded: 11 April 2003; 23 years ago
- Ground: Robertão, Camboriú, Santa Catarina state, Brazil
- Capacity: 3,000
- League: Campeonato Catarinense
- 2025: Catarinense Série B, 2nd of 9 (promoted)
- Website: www.camboriufc.com
Home colors	Away colors	colors

Camboriú Futebol Clube, commonly known as Camboriú, is a Brazilian football club based in Camboriú, Santa Catarina state.

== History ==
The club was founded on 11 April 2003, as Sociedade Desportiva Camboriuense. They won the Campeonato Catarinense Série C in 2006. The club was renamed to Camboriú Futebol Clube on 24 April 2009.

== Honours ==
=== Official tournaments ===
State
Competitions	Titles	Seasons
Campeonato Catarinense Série B	1	2011
Campeonato Catarinense Série C	1	2006

=== Runners-up ===
- Campeonato Catarinense (1): 2022
- Campeonato Catarinense Série B (4): 2007, 2015, 2021, 2025

== Stadium ==
Camboriú Futebol Clube play their home games at Estádio Roberto Santos Garcia, nicknamed Robertão. The stadium has a maximum capacity of 3,000 people.
