= 2022 Campeonato Cearense =

Campeonato Cearense
- Season: 2022
- Dates: 8 January – 23 April
- Champions: Fortaleza (45th title)
- Relegated: Crato; Icasa
- Copa do Brasil: Caucaia; Ferroviário; Iguatu; Fortaleza (via Série A); Ceará (via RNC)
- Série D: Caucaia; Iguatu; Pacajus; Atlético Cearense (via Série C); Ferroviário (via Série C)
- Copa do Nordeste: Fortaleza; Ceará (via RNC)
- Copa do Nordeste qualification: Caucaia; Ferroviário (via RNC)
- Matches played: 66
- Goals scored: 155 (2.35 per match)
- Top goalscorer: Edson Cariús (9 goals)

The 2022 Campeonato Cearense (officially the Cearense 1XBET 2022 for sponsorship reasons) was the 108th edition of Ceará's top professional football league organized by FCF. The competition began on 8 January and ended on 23 April 2022.

After Sportradar found evidence of match fixing, on 16 February 2022, the FCF and the Tribunal de Justiça Desportiva do Futebol do Ceará (TJDF-CE) decided to suspend Crato from the tournament. Therefore, the last match of the first stage Crato v Ferroviário, scheduled for 19 February 2022, was not played and Ferroviário was awarded a 3–0 win.

On 22 February 2022, Icasa were denounced by Atlético Cearense before the TJDF-CE for fielding Leandro Mendes in the match Iguatu v Icasa played on 19 February 2022 (14th round). He was booked three times during the tournament (against Crato, Ferroviário and Maracanã) and was ineligible for the match against Iguatu. Later, Maracanã and Icasa asked the TJDF-CE to expel Crato from the tournament instead of suspending them. With this request, all the matches played by Crato would be annulled and replaced by 3–0 wins, which would allow Maracaná to qualify for the quarter-finals and avoid the possible relegation of Icasa. As the first legs of the semifinals were scheduled for 6 and 8 March 2022, the TJDF-CE suspended the Campeonato Cearense from 6 to 11 March 2022 until the judgement of the case. Although the announcement of the suspension was made while Caucaia and Iguatu were playing the first leg of their semi-final, the match was finished. On 7 March 2022, the STJD (Superior Tribunal de Justiça Desportiva) authorized the FCF to continue with the tournament as initially scheduled. Days later, the TJDF-CE also authorized the normal development of the tournament until the end of the match fixing investigation. On 25 April 2022, the TJDF-CE excluded Crato from the tournament and the matches played by Crato against Pacajus, Iguatu, Atlético Cearense and Ferroviário were annulled and replaced by 3–0 wins, however, two weeks later the TJDF-CE overturned its own decision and annulled all the matches played by Crato and replaced them by 3–0 wins. On 19 May 2022, the STJD, in response to a request from the FCF, Fortaleza, Ferroviário, Caucaia, Iguatu and Crato, temporarily suspended the decisions of the TJDF-CE. Finally, on 23 June 2022, the STJD overruled the decisions of the TJDF-CE confirming the match results and the title of Fortaleza.

Finally, Icasa were deducted four points and sanctioned with a fine of R$3,000 after they were punished, on 25 August 2022, by the TJDF-CE for fielding Leandro Mendes. Icasa were relegated.

The finals were played between the defending champions Fortaleza and Caucaia. Fortaleza won 4–0 on aggregate to win their 45th title.

== Format ==
In the first stage the teams (except the teams that participated in the 2022 Copa do Nordeste, Ceará and Fortaleza) played the other teams on a home-and-away round-robin tournament. Top two teams advanced to the semi-finals, while third and fourth places advanced to the quarter-finals. The bottom two teams were relegated to 2023 Campeonato Cearense Série B. First stage winners qualified for the 2023 Copa do Brasil. Ceará and Fortaleza started their participation in the quarter-finals.

Quarter-finals, semi-finals and finals were played on a home-and-away two-legged basis. If tied on aggregate, the penalty shoot-out would be used to determine the winners. A draw was held to determine the home-and-away teams for the quarter-finals and the semi-finals, while for the finals, the team with best performance in the semi-finals hosted the second leg. Champions qualified for the 2023 Copa do Brasil.

== Teams ==
Club	Home city	Manager
Atlético Cearense	Fortaleza	Reginaldo França
Caucaia	Caucaia	Roberto Carlos
Ceará	Fortaleza	Tiago Nunes
Crato	Crato	Jânio Fialho
Ferroviário	Fortaleza	Paulinho Kobayashi
Fortaleza	Fortaleza	Juan Pablo Vojvoda
Icasa	Juazeiro do Norte	Sidney Moraes
Iguatu	Iguatu	Washington Luiz
Maracanã	Maracanaú	Júnior Cearense
Pacajus	Pacajus	Raimundo Wágner

== First stage ==
Pos	Team	Pld	W	D	L	GF	GA	GD	Pts	Qualification or relegation
1	Caucaia	14	8	6	0	20	8	+12	30	Advance to the semi-finals and qualify for the 2023 Copa do Brasil
2	Ferroviário	14	6	8	0	24	9	+15	26	Advance to the semi-finals
3	Pacajus	14	5	5	4	17	14	+3	20	Advance to quarter-finals
4	Iguatu	14	5	4	5	23	13	+10	19	Advance to quarter-finals
5	Maracanã	14	3	8	3	16	15	+1	17	
6	Atlético Cearense	14	3	4	7	19	24	−5	13	
7	Icasa (Note: Icasa were deducted four points.) (R)	14	3	7	4	9	11	−2	12	Relegation to the 2023 Campeonato Cearense Série B
8	Crato (R)	14	1	2	11	5	39	−34	5	Relegation to the 2023 Campeonato Cearense Série B

Source: FCF
Rules for classification: 1) Points; 2) Wins; 3) Goal difference; 4) Goals scored; 5) Head-to-head result (only between two teams); 6) Draw.
(R) Relegated

== Final stages ==
=== Bracket ===
Quarter-finals
Ceará	2	0	2 (3)
4	Iguatu (p)	1	1	2 (4)
Fortaleza	1	5	6
3	Pacajus	0	0	0

Semi-finals
1	Caucaia	2	1	3
4	Iguatu	0	1	1
2	Ferroviário	0	1	1
Fortaleza	1	2	3

Finals
1	Caucaia	0	0	0
Fortaleza	0	4	4

=== Quarter-finals ===
Team 1	Agg.	Team 2	1st leg	2nd leg
Fortaleza	6–0	Pacajus	1–0	5–0
Ceará	2–2 (3–4 p)	Iguatu	2–1	0–1

==== Group 1 ====
24 February 2022
21:30

Fortaleza	1–0	Pacajus
Titi 52'	Report

Castelão, Fortaleza
Attendance: 7,626
Referee: Elizabete Esmeralda Cordeiro dos Santos Gomes

2 March 2022
19:30

Pacajus	0–5	Fortaleza
	Report	Robson 11'; Yago Pikachu 45+3'; Moisés 51'; Romero 75'; Hércules 86'

Castelão, Fortaleza
Attendance: 10,524
Referee: Raimundo Rodrigues de Oliveira Júnior

==== Group 2 ====
22 February 2022
20:00

Ceará	2–1	Iguatu
Mendoza 21' (pen.); Zé Roberto 28' (pen.)	Report	Davi 61'

Castelão, Fortaleza
Attendance: 6,531
Referee: Antônio Magno Lima Cordeiro

26 February 2022
17:45

Iguatu	1–0	Ceará
Otacílio Marcos 80'	Report
Penalties
Otacílio Marcos (penalty missed); Dodô (penalty missed); Bruno Menezes (penalty scored); Davi (penalty scored); Marcondi (penalty scored); Romário Becker (penalty scored)	4–3	(penalty missed) Vina; (penalty scored) Victor Luis; (penalty missed) Marlon; (penalty scored) Kelvyn; (penalty scored) Mendoza; (penalty missed) Gabriel Lacerda

Estádio Antônio Moreno de Melo, Iguatu
Attendance: 1,095
Referee: Renato Pinheiro

=== Semi-finals ===
Team 1	Agg.	Team 2	1st leg	2nd leg
Caucaia	3–1	Iguatu	2–0	1–1
Ferroviário	1–3	Fortaleza	0–1	1–2

==== Group 3 ====
6 March 2022
16:00

Caucaia	2–0	Iguatu
Bravo 84', 86'	Report

Estádio Municipal João Ronaldo, Pacajus
Attendance: 138
Referee: Luciano da Silva Miranda Filho

12 March 2022
16:00

Iguatu	1–1	Caucaia
Otacílio Marcos 54'	Report	Iury Tanque 37' (pen.)

Estádio Antônio Moreno de Melo, Iguatu
Attendance: 893
Referee: Wladyerisson Silva Oliveira

==== Group 4 ====
8 March 2022
21:30

Ferroviário	0–1	Fortaleza
	Report	Yago Pikachu 40'

Castelão, Fortaleza
Attendance: 4,246
Referee: Luiz César de Oliveira Magalhães

12 March 2022
17:45

Fortaleza	2–1	Ferroviário
Moisés 4'; André Baumer 90+3' (o.g.)	Report	Edson Cariús 73'

Castelão, Fortaleza
Attendance: 24,503
Referee: Marcelo de Lima Henrique

=== Finals ===
As Caucaia and Fortaleza had already qualified for the Copa do Brasil by winning the first stage and the 2022 Copa do Nordeste, respectively, third place Ferroviário earned a berth for the 2023 Copa do Brasil.

Team 1	Agg.	Team 2	1st leg	2nd leg
Caucaia	0–4	Fortaleza	0–0	0–4

==== Matches ====
22 April 2022
21:35

Caucaia	0–0	Fortaleza
	Report

Castelão, Fortaleza
Attendance: 3,895
Referee: Luciano da Silva Miranda Filho

Caucaia	Fortaleza

GK	1	(Brazil) Célio
DF	20	(Brazil) Ceará (c)
DF	15	(Brazil) Roni
DF	4	(Brazil) Túlio
DF	6	(Brazil) Matheus Maranguape
MF	5	(Brazil) Wilker		(substituted off) 71'
MF	8	(Brazil) Guto
MF	7	(Brazil) Santos		(substituted off) 64'
FW	11	(Brazil) Goiaba		(substituted off) 83'
FW	9	(Brazil) Iury Tanque		(substituted off) 71'
FW	17	(Brazil) Vanderlan		(substituted off) 64'
Substitutes:
DF	2	(Brazil) Adilson
DF	3	(Brazil) Lucas Neres
MF	10	(Brazil) Éverton		(substituted in) 71'
MF	13	(Brazil) Jair Pitbull
MF	14	(Brazil) Isaú
MF	16	(Brazil) Leylon		(substituted in) 64'
MF	18	(Brazil) Vitinho		(substituted in) 83'
MF	21	(Brazil) Sidin
FW	19	(Brazil) Bravo		(substituted in) 71'
FW	22	(Brazil) Vitor Ribeiro
FW	23	(Brazil) Caio
FW	55	(Brazil) Xandy	(yellow card) 87'	(substituted in) 64'
Coach:
(Brazil) Roberto Carlos

GK	23	(Brazil) Max Walef
DF	3	(Ecuador) Anthony Landázuri		(substituted off) 76'
DF	6	(Colombia) Brayan Ceballos	(yellow card) 51'
DF	4	(Brazil) Titi (c)
DF	29	(Brazil) Juninho Capixaba
MF	14	(Brazil) Ronald		(substituted off) 59'
MF	35	(Brazil) Hércules
MF	20	(Brazil) Matheus Vargas		(substituted off) 59'
FW	11	(Brazil) Romarinho	(yellow card) 30'
FW	79	(Brazil) Renato Kayzer		(substituted off) 71'
FW	7	(Brazil) Robson		(substituted off) 59'
Substitutes:
GK	1	(Brazil) Marcelo Boeck
DF	5	(Brazil) Marcelo Benevenuto
DF	40	(Brazil) Vitor Ricardo
MF	10	(Brazil) Lucas Crispim		(substituted in) 59'
MF	13	(Brazil) Lucas Lima		(substituted in) 59'
MF	15	(Brazil) Felipe
MF	22	(Brazil) Yago Pikachu		(substituted in) 76'
FW	18	(Argentina) Silvio Romero		(substituted in) 71'
FW	19	(Chile) Ángelo Henríquez
FW	21	(Brazil) Moisés		(substituted in) 59'
FW	34	(Argentina) Valentín Depietri
FW	77	(Brazil) Igor Torres
Coach:
(Argentina) Juan Pablo Vojvoda

Assistant referees:
José Moracy de Sousa e Silva
Camila Ferreira de Sousa
Fourth official:
Renato Pinheiro
Fifth official:
Alexandre de Souza Peixoto
Video assistant referee:
Luiz César de Oliveira Magalhães
Assistant video assistant referees:
Léo Simão Holanda

24 April 2022
18:30

Fortaleza	4–0	Caucaia
Romero 31'; Yago Pikachu 55', 64'; Ronald 78'	Report

Castelão, Fortaleza
Attendance: 34,790
Referee: Marcelo de Lima Henrique

Fortaleza	Caucaia

GK	23	(Brazil) Max Walef
DF	2	(Brazil) Tinga (c)
DF	5	(Brazil) Marcelo Benevenuto
DF	4	(Brazil) Titi
MF	22	(Brazil) Yago Pikachu
MF	35	(Brazil) Hércules		(substituted off) 71'
MF	15	(Brazil) Felipe		(substituted off) 59'
MF	13	(Brazil) Lucas Lima
MF	10	(Brazil) Lucas Crispim		(substituted off) 67'
FW	18	(Argentina) Silvio Romero		(substituted off) 59'
FW	21	(Brazil) Moisés		(substituted off) 59'
Substitutes:
GK	1	(Brazil) Marcelo Boeck
DF	3	(Ecuador) Anthony Landázuri
DF	6	(Colombia) Brayan Ceballos
DF	29	(Brazil) Juninho Capixaba		(substituted in) 67'
DF	40	(Brazil) Vitor Ricardo
MF	8	(Brazil) Matheus Jussa	(yellow card) 88'	(substituted in) 59'
MF	14	(Brazil) Ronald		(substituted in) 71'
MF	20	(Brazil) Matheus Vargas
FW	7	(Brazil) Robson
FW	11	(Brazil) Romarinho
FW	34	(Argentina) Valentín Depietri		(substituted in) 59'
FW	79	(Brazil) Renato Kayzer		(substituted in) 59'
Coach:
(Argentina) Juan Pablo Vojvoda

GK	1	(Brazil) Célio
DF	20	(Brazil) Ceará (c)
DF	15	(Brazil) Roni
DF	4	(Brazil) Túlio
DF	6	(Brazil) Matheus Maranguape
MF	5	(Brazil) Wilker
MF	8	(Brazil) Guto	(yellow card) 40'	(substituted off) 67'
MF	7	(Brazil) Santos		(substituted off) 67'
FW	11	(Brazil) Goiaba		(substituted off) 46'
FW	17	(Brazil) Vanderlan		(substituted off) 59'
FW	9	(Brazil) Iury Tanque		(substituted off) 76'
Substitutes:
DF	2	(Brazil) Adilson
DF	3	(Brazil) Igor Jacaré
DF	23	(Brazil) Lucas Neres
MF	10	(Brazil) Éverton		(substituted in) 67'
MF	13	(Brazil) Jair Pitbull
MF	14	(Brazil) Isaú
MF	16	(Brazil) Leylon		(substituted in) 67'
MF	18	(Brazil) Vitinho		(substituted in) 46'
MF	21	(Brazil) Sidin
FW	19	(Brazil) Bravo		(substituted in) 59'
FW	22	(Brazil) Vitor Ribeiro		(substituted in) 76'
FW	55	(Brazil) Caio
Coach:
(Brazil) Roberto Carlos

Assistant referees:
Nailton Júnior de Souza Oliveira
Renan Aguiar da Costa
Fourth official:
José Denis Garcês Lima
Fifth official:
Elizabete Esmeralda Cordeiro dos Santos Gomes
Video assistant referee:
Adriano Barros Carneiro
Assistant video assistant referees:
Antônio Magno Lima Cordeiro

== Overall table ==
Pos	Team	Pld	W	D	L	GF	GA	GD	Pts	Qualification or relegation
1	Fortaleza (Note: Fortaleza qualified for the Copa do Brasil via 2022 Campeonato Brasileiro Série A.)	6	5	1	0	13	1	+12	16	Champions and 2023 Copa do Brasil
2	Caucaia	18	9	8	1	23	13	+10	35	Runners-up and 2023 Copa do Brasil and 2023 Série D
3	Ferroviário (Note: Ferroviário and Atlético Cearense qualified for the Série D via 2022 Campeonato Brasileiro Série C.)	16	6	8	2	25	12	+13	26	2023 Copa do Brasil and 2023 Série D
4	Iguatu (Note: Originally, Pacajus qualified for the Copa do Brasil by winning the 2022 Copa Fares Lopes, however, CBF announced that the 2022 Copa Fares Lopes did not meet the requirements as Copa do Brasil qualification tournament. CBF awarded the berth to the 4th place Iguatu.)	18	6	5	7	26	18	+8	23	2023 Copa do Brasil and 2023 Série D
5	Pacajus	16	5	5	6	17	20	−3	20	2023 Série D
6	Ceará (Note: Ceará qualified for the Copa do Brasil via CBF ranking.)	2	1	0	1	2	2	0	3	2023 Copa do Brasil
7	Maracanã	14	3	8	3	16	15	+1	17	
8	Atlético Cearense	14	3	4	7	19	24	−5	13	2023 Série D
9	Icasa (Note: Icasa were deducted four points.)	14	3	7	4	9	11	−2	12	Relegation to the 2023 Campeonato Cearense Série B
10	Crato	14	1	2	11	5	39	−34	5	Relegation to the 2023 Campeonato Cearense Série B

Source: FCF

== Top goalscorers ==
Rank	Player	Team	Goals
1	(Brazil) Edson Cariús	Ferroviário	9
2	(Russia) Ari	Atlético Cearense	7
2	(Brazil) Romário	Iguatu	7
4	(Brazil) Edson	Pacajus	6
4	(Brazil) Otacílio Marcos	Iguatu	6
6	(Brazil) Vanderlan	Caucaia	5
6	(Brazil) Vitinho	Caucaia	5
