= Roberto Carlos (footballer, born 1971) =

Brazilian football manager

Personal information
- Full name: Roberto Carlos dos Santos
- Date of birth: 27 January 1971 (age 55)
- Place of birth: Ocara, Brazil
- Position: Left back

Team information
- Current team: Maranguape (head coach)

Senior career*
Years	Team	Apps	(Gls)
1991–1998	Ceará		(3)
- Ferroviário
2001	Tiradentes-CE		
- Quixadá
- 4 de Julho
- Potiguar Mossoró
- Atlético Cajazeiras
2002	Botafogo-PB		
- Rio Branco-SP
- Atlético Goianiense
2004–2005	Horizonte		

Managerial career
- 2004–2010: Horizonte (assistant)
- 2011–2014: Horizonte
- 2015: Itapipoca
- 2015: Sousa
- 2016–2017: Horizonte
- 2017: Uniclinic
- 2017–2018: Iguatu
- 2018: Caucaia
- 2018–2019: Iguatu
- 2019: Sousa
- 2019: Tiradentes-CE
- 2019–2020: Horizonte
- 2020–2021: Pacajus
- 2022: Caucaia
- 2022: Atlético Cearense
- 2023: Caucaia
- 2024–: Maranguape
- * Club domestic league appearances and goals

Roberto Carlos dos Santos (born 27 January 1971), known as Roberto Carlos, is a Brazilian football coach and former player who played as a right back. He is the current head coach of Maranguape.

== Playing career ==
Roberto Carlos was born in Ocara, Ceará, and began his career in 1989. He represented Ceará, Ferroviário, Tiradentes-CE, Quixadá, 4 de Julho, Potiguar de Mossoró, Atlético de Cajazeiras, Botafogo-PB, Rio Branco-SP, Atlético Goianiense. He retired from professional football in 2002, aged 31.

== Managerial career ==
In 2004, Roberto Carlos joined Horizonte as an assistant manager, but also played for the side due to the lack of players. In 2006, he stopped playing to become a full-time assistant manager of the side, and remained in the role until February 2011, when he was named manager of the club.

On 26 November 2014, after nearly ten years at the club, Roberto Carlos left Horizonte to take over Itapipoca. On 5 February 2015, he was named in charge of Sousa. He was sacked by the latter on 24 April.

Roberto Carlos returned to Horizonte for the 2016 season, but was sacked in January 2017. On 10 February of that year, he was appointed Uniclinic manager.

Roberto Carlos finished the 2017 in charge of Iguatu, and won the Campeonato Cearense Série B of that year. He left the club after the Campeonato Cearense ended, and was named manager of Caucaia on 13 April 2018.

Roberto Carlos returned to Iguatu in June 2018, but was dismissed the following 20 January. The following day, he returned to Sousa, but left in March after the club's elimination in the Campeonato Paraibano. He was subsequently named in charge of Tiradentes, but was sacked on 22 May 2019.

On 1 December 2021, Roberto Carlos returned to Caucaia. He led the side to the second position of the 2022 Campeonato Cearense before returning to Uniclinic on 26 April 2022, with the club now named Atlético Cearense.

Roberto Carlos was sacked on 20 July 2022, with Atlético in the last position in the third division.

== Honours ==
=== Manager ===
Horizonte

- Copa Fares Lopes: 2011

Iguatu

- Campeonato Cearense Série B: 2017
