= Marcelo Boeck =

Brazilian footballer (born 1984)

Personal information
- Full name: Marcelo Boeck
- Date of birth: 28 November 1984 (age 41)
- Place of birth: Vera Cruz, Brazil
- Height: 1.90 m (6 ft 3 in)
- Position: Goalkeeper

Youth career
- 1998–2003: Internacional

Senior career*
Years	Team	Apps	(Gls)
2004–2007	Internacional	17	(0)
2007–2010	Marítimo B	12	(0)
2007–2011	Marítimo	35	(0)
2011–2016	Sporting CP	4	(0)
2012–2013	Sporting CP B	6	(0)
2016	→ Chapecoense (loan)	7	(0)
2017–2022	Fortaleza	125	(0)
Total		206	(0)
- * Club domestic league appearances and goals

Marcelo Boeck (born 28 November 1984) is a Brazilian former professional footballer who played as a goalkeeper.

== Club career ==
=== Internacional ===
Born in Vera Cruz, Rio Grande do Sul of Belgian descent, Boeck started his professional career with SC Internacional, being part of the squads that won the 2006 Copa Libertadores, the 2006 FIFA Club World Cup and the 2007 Recopa Sudamericana, as well as the Campeonato Gaúcho on two occasions.

In four years, he played only 20 official games.

=== Marítimo ===
Boeck signed a three-year contract with C.S. Marítimo of Portugal on 17 August 2007. He totalled just five Primeira Liga matches in his first three seasons, acting as backup to successively Marcos and Peterson Peçanha and also fighting for second-choice status with Bruno Grassi, all three his compatriots; additionally, he also appeared on and off for the reserves in the third division.

In the 2010–11 campaign, Boeck won the battle for the starting job with Peçanha, and played all 30 league fixtures for the Madeirans as they finished in mid-table.

=== Sporting CP ===
On 30 June 2011, Boeck joined Sporting CP on a five-year deal for an undisclosed fee. He played second-fiddle to youth graduate and Portuguese international Rui Patrício during his spell.

When the team celebrated winning the Supertaça Cândido de Oliveira on 10 August 2015, Boeck doused striker Islam Slimani in champagne, angering the Algerian due to his Islamic faith's prohibition of alcohol. The following 8 January, he extended his contract until 2018 with an option for a further year.

Boeck appeared in 28 competitive matches in his four-and-a-half-year tenure at the Estádio José Alvalade.

=== Chapecoense ===
In the last days of the 2016 January transfer window, Boeck returned to his country and its Série A, joining Associação Chapecoense de Futebol who retained 50% of his sporting rights. He did not board LaMia Flight 2933 for the 2016 Copa Sudamericana Finals, which crashed and killed 19 of his teammates, because it was his birthday.

=== Fortaleza ===
Boeck moved to Fortaleza Esporte Clube in December 2016. He was a very important part of the squads that won two consecutive promotions from Série C, but lost his starting spot in 2019 to new signing Felipe Alves.

Immediately after his contract expired in December 2021, the 37-year-old Boeck agreed to a one-year extension. He remained connected to the club after retiring, leaving his post as executive assistant on 27 January 2026.

== Career statistics ==
Appearances and goals by club, season and competition
Club	Season	League			State League		Cup		Continental		Other		Total	
Club	Season	Division	Apps	Goals	Apps	Goals	Apps	Goals	Apps	Goals	Apps	Goals	Apps	Goals
Internacional	2005	Série A	5	0	1	0	2	0	—		—		8	0
Internacional	2006	Série A	3	0	8	0	—		1 (Note: Appearance in Copa Libertadores)	0	—		12	0
Internacional	2007	Série A	0	0	0	0	—		0	0	—		0	0
Internacional	Subtotal		8	0	9	0	2	0	1	0	—		20	0
Marítimo B	2007–08	Segunda Divisão	1	0	—								1	0
Marítimo B	2008–09	Segunda Divisão	2	0	—								2	0
Marítimo B	2009–10	Segunda Divisão	9	0	—								9	0
Marítimo B	Subtotal		12	0	—								12	0
Marítimo	2007–08	Primeira Liga	0	0	—		0	0	—		—		0	0
Marítimo	2008–09	Primeira Liga	2	0	—		0	0	0	0	1 (Note: Appearances in Taça da Liga)	0	3	0
Marítimo	2009–10	Primeira Liga	3	0	—		1	0	—		—		4	0
Marítimo	2010–11	Primeira Liga	30	0	—		0	0	4 (Note: Appearances in UEFA Europa League)	0	1	0	35	0
Marítimo	Subtotal		35	0	—		1	0	4	0	2	0	42	0
Sporting CP	2011–12	Primeira Liga	2	0	—		0	0	3	0	3	0	8	0
Sporting CP	2012–13	Primeira Liga	0	0	—		0	0	1	0	2	0	3	0
Sporting CP	2013–14	Primeira Liga	0	0	—		0	0	—		3	0	3	0
Sporting CP	2014–15	Primeira Liga	1	0	—		3	0	0	0	4	0	8	0
Sporting CP	2015–16	Primeira Liga	1	0	—		1	0	2	0	2	0	6	0
Sporting CP	Subtotal		4	0	—		4	0	6	0	14	0	28	0
Sporting CP B	2012–13	Segunda Liga	3	0	—								3	0
Sporting CP B	2013–14	Segunda Liga	3	0	—								3	0
Sporting CP B	Subtotal		6	0	—								6	0
Chapecoense	2016	Série A	6	0	1	0	4	0	0	0	—		11	0
Fortaleza	2017	Série C	23	0	13	0	1	0	—		5 (Note: Appearances in Copa do Nordeste)	0	42	0
Fortaleza	2018	Série B	33	0	15	0	0	0	—		—		48	0
Fortaleza	2019	Série A	7	0	1	0	1	0	—		12	0	21	0
Fortaleza	2020	Série A	0	0	1	0	0	0	0	0	0	0	1	0
Fortaleza	2021	Série A	19	0	0	0	4	0	—		2	0	25	0
Fortaleza	2022	Série A	13	0	0	0	3	0	4	0	0	0	20	0
Fortaleza	Subtotal		95	0	30	0	9	0	4	0	19	0	157	0
Career total			166	0	40	0	20	0	15	0	35	0	276	0

== Honours ==
Internacional

- FIFA Club World Cup: 2006
- Copa Libertadores: 2006
- Campeonato Gaúcho: 2005

Sporting CP

- Taça de Portugal: 2014–15
- Supertaça Cândido de Oliveira: 2015

Chapecoense

- Copa Sudamericana: 2016 (posthumously)
- Campeonato Catarinense: 2016

Fortaleza

- Campeonato Brasileiro Série B: 2018
- Copa do Nordeste: 2019, 2022
- Campeonato Cearense: 2019, 2020, 2021, 2022
