= Ronald (footballer, born June 1997) =

Brazilian footballer, born June 1997

Personal information
- Full name: Ronald dos Santos Lopes
- Date of birth: 18 June 1997 (age 29)
- Place of birth: Belford Roxo, Brazil
- Height: 1.71 m (5 ft 7 in)
- Position: Midfielder

Team information
- Current team: Criciúma (on loan from Vitória)

Youth career
- Audax Rio
- Flamengo
- Nova Iguaçu

Senior career*
Years	Team	Apps	(Gls)
2016–2018	Nova Iguaçu	3	(0)
2019	Nacional de Muriaé	7	(1)
2019	Ponte Preta	0	(0)
2020–2021	Juventus Jaraguá	11	(0)
2020–2021	→ Fortaleza (loan)	28	(0)
2021–	Fortaleza	45	(1)
2023	→ Cuiabá (loan)	21	(2)
2024	→ Mirassol (loan)	6	(0)
2024	→ Criciúma (loan)	30	(1)
2025–	Vitória	44	(0)
2026–	→ Criciúma (loan)	0	(0)
- * Club domestic league appearances and goals as of 8 April 2026

Ronald dos Santos Lopes (born 18 June 1997), simply known as Ronald, is a Brazilian footballer who plays as a midfielder for Criciúma, on loan from Vitória.

== Club career ==
Born in Belford Roxo, Rio de Janeiro, Ronald made his senior debut with Nova Iguaçu in 2016. Ahead of the 2019 season, after featuring rarely, he joined Nacional de Muriaé of the Campeonato Mineiro Módulo II. In the remainder of the year, he also played for Ponte Preta's reserve team in the Copa Paulista.

In December 2019, Ronald moved to Juventus Jaraguá, and immediately became a regular starter. On 10 August 2020, he joined Série A side Fortaleza on loan until the end of the season.

Ronald made his debut in the top tier of Brazilian football on 20 August 2020, coming on as a second-half substitute for Felipe in a 3–1 away win against Goiás. The following 8 April, he signed a permanent contract with Fortaleza until 2024.

== Career statistics ==
As of 26 February 2023.

Club	Season	League			State League		Cup		Continental		Other		Total	
Club	Season	Division	Apps	Goals	Apps	Goals	Apps	Goals	Apps	Goals	Apps	Goals	Apps	Goals
Nova Iguaçu	2016	Carioca Série B	—		1	0	—		—		—		1	0
Nova Iguaçu	2017	Carioca	—		0	0	—		—		—		0	0
Nova Iguaçu	2018	Série D	0	0	2	0	0	0	—		0	0	2	0
Nova Iguaçu	Total		0	0	3	0	0	0	—		0	0	3	0
Nacional Muriaé	2019	Mineiro Módulo II	—		7	1	—		—		—		7	1
Ponte Preta	2019	Série B	0	0	—		—		—		10 (Note: Appearance(s) in Copa Paulista)	0	10	0
Juventus Jaraguá	2020	Catarinense	—		11	0	—		—		—		11	0
Fortaleza	2020	Série A	28	0	2	0	2	0	—		—		32	0
Fortaleza	2021	Série A	23	0	5	1	6	1	—		1 (Note: Appearance(s) in Copa do Nordeste)	0	35	2
Fortaleza	2022	Série A	20	0	5	1	5	0	2 (Note: Appearance(s) in Copa Libertadores)	0	9	0	41	1
Fortaleza	2023	Série A	0	0	1	0	0	0	—		1	0	2	0
Fortaleza	Total		71	0	13	2	13	1	2	0	11	0	110	3
Cuiabá (loan)	2023	Série A	0	0	1	0	1	0	—		—		2	0
Career total			71	0	35	3	14	1	2	0	21	0	143	4

== Honours ==
Nova Iguaçu

- Campeonato Carioca Série B: 2016

Fortaleza

- Campeonato Cearense: 2020, 2021, 2022
- Copa do Nordeste: 2022
