= Max Walef =

Brazilian footballer (born 1993)

Personal information
- Full name: Max Walef Araújo da Silva
- Date of birth: 23 October 1993 (age 33)
- Place of birth: Teresina, Brazil
- Height: 1.85 m (6 ft 1 in)
- Position: Goalkeeper

Team information
- Current team: Botafogo-PB
- Number: 23

Youth career
- 2008–2013: Fortaleza

Senior career*
Years	Team	Apps	(Gls)
2014–2022	Fortaleza	41	(0)
2022–2023	Dnipro-1	27	(0)
2024	Inter de Limeira	11	(0)
2024–2025	Al-Najma	32	(0)
2026–	Botafogo-PB	6	(0)
- * Club domestic league appearances and goals as of 8 November 2026

Max Walef Araújo da Silva (born 23 October 1993) is a Brazilian professional footballer who plays as a goalkeeper for Botafogo-PB.

== Professional career ==
Walef has spent most of his professional career as the third, and sometimes fourth goalkeeper of Fortaleza having joined them in 2009. Walef made his professional debut with Fortaleza in a 2-1 Campeonato Brasileiro Série B win over São Bento on 25 September 2018.

On 19 July 2024, Walef joined Saudi First Division club Al-Najma.

== Career statistics ==
As of 13 May 2021

Club	Season	League			State League		Cup		Continental		Other		Total	
Club	Season	Division	Apps	Goals	Apps	Goals	Apps	Goals	Apps	Goals	Apps	Goals	Apps	Goals
Fortaleza	2014	Série C	0	0	0	0	0	0	—		—		0	0
Fortaleza	2015	Série C	0	0	0	0	0	0	—		5 (Note: Appearance(s) in Copa Fares Lopes)	0	5	0
Fortaleza	2016	Série C	0	0	1	0	0	0	—		3	0	4	0
Fortaleza	2017	Série C	0	0	0	0	0	0	—		6	0	6	0
Fortaleza	2018	Série B	3	0	0	0	0	0	—		1	0	4	0
Fortaleza	2019	Série A	0	0	0	0	0	0	—		0	0	0	0
Fortaleza	2020	Série A	1	0	2	0	2	0	0	0	0	0	5	0
Fortaleza	2021	Série A	0	0	1	0	0	0	—		0	0	1	0
Total			4	0	4	0	2	0	0	0	15	0	25	0

== Honours ==
Fortaleza

- Campeonato Brasileiro Série B: 2018
- Taça dos Campeões Cearenses: 2016 e 2017
- Campeonato Cearense: 2015, 2016, 2019, 2020, 2021, 2022
- Copa do Nordeste: 2019, 2022
