= Júnior Cearense =

Brazilian footballer

Personal information
- Full name: José Gerardo Moreira Rocha Júnior
- Date of birth: 19 November 1977 (age 48)
- Place of birth: Fortaleza, Brazil
- Height: 1.76 m (5 ft 9 in)
- Position: Midfielder

Team information
- Current team: Maracanã (head coach)

Senior career*
Years	Team	Apps	(Gls)
2000	Tiradentes-CE		
2000–2002	Fortaleza		
2003–2006	Ferroviário		
2003	→ Guarany de Sobral (loan)		
2004	→ Ceará (loan)	7	(0)
2005	→ River (loan)		
2007	Campinense		
2007	Aracati		
2007–2011	Horizonte		
2008	→ Fortaleza (loan)		
2009	→ Uniclinic (loan)		
2010	→ Ceará (loan)	2	(0)
2012	Tiradentes-CE	21	(2)
2012–2014	Guarany de Sobral	49	(4)

Managerial career
- 2015–2017: Guarany de Sobral
- 2018: Tiradentes-CE
- 2018–2020: Pacajus
- 2020: Maranguape
- 2020–2022: Maracanã
- 2022: Itapipoca
- 2023: Maracanã
- 2023: Pacatuba
- 2023: Imperatriz
- 2024–: Maracanã
- * Club domestic league appearances and goals

José Gerardo Rocha Moreira Júnior (born 19 November 1977), known as Júnior Cearense, is a Brazilian football coach and former player who played as a midfielder. He is the current head coach of Maracanã.

== Career ==
He is a veteran midfielder who has played for several clubs in Brazil, including the rivals Ceará and Fortaleza.
