= Felipe (footballer, born 1994) =

Brazilian footballer

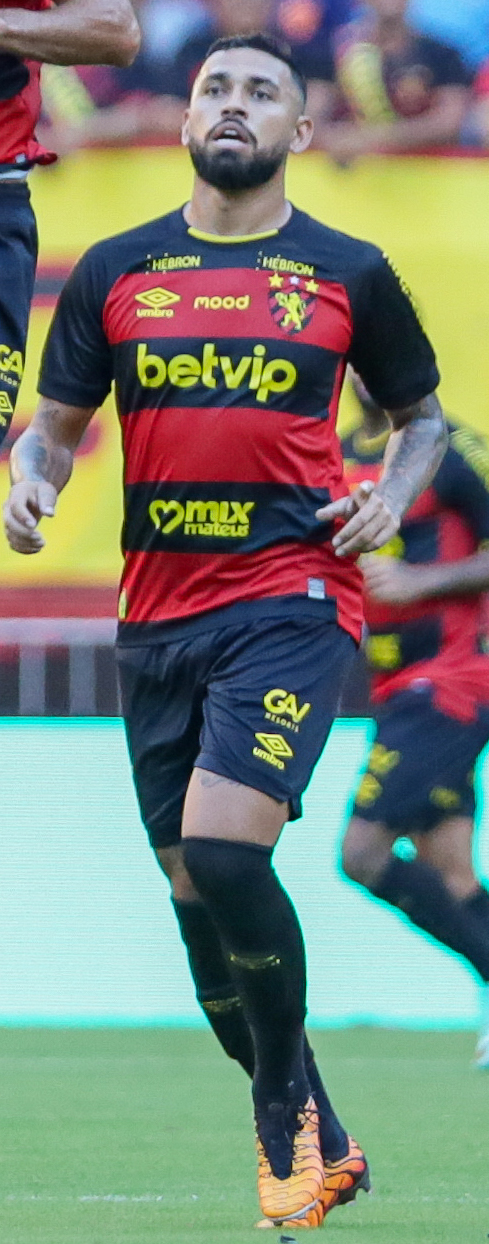

Personal information
- Full name: Luiz Antonio Ferreira Rodrigues
- Date of birth: 10 April 1994 (age 32)
- Place of birth: Maranguape, Brazil
- Height: 1.84 m (6 ft 1/2 in)
- Positions: Right back; defensive midfielder

Team information
- Current team: Liaoning Tieren
- Number: 15

Senior career*
Years	Team	Apps	(Gls)
2012–2015	Maranguape	38	(0)
2014	→ Uniclinic (loan)	6	(0)
2015–2022	Fortaleza	222	(7)
2023–2025	Goiás	17	(1)
2023–2024	→ Sport Recife (loan)	56	(0)
2025–	Liaoning Tieren	52	(1)
- * Club domestic league appearances and goals as of 17 October 2026

Luiz Antonio Ferreira Rodrigues (born 10 April 1994), known by his nickname Felipe, is a Brazilian footballer who plays for Liaoning Tieren as a right back or a defensive midfielder.

== Career statistics ==
As of match played 17 October 2026

Appearances and goals by club, season and competition
Club	Season	League			State League		Cup		Continental		Other		Total	
Club	Season	Division	Apps	Goals	Apps	Goals	Apps	Goals	Apps	Goals	Apps	Goals	Apps	Goals
Maranguape	2012	Cearense Série B	—		0	0	—		—		4 (Note: Appearance(s) in Copa Fares Lopes)	0	4	0
Maranguape	2013	Cearense Série B	—		15	0	—		—		2	0	17	0
Maranguape	2014	Cearense Série B	—		11	0	—		—		—		11	0
Maranguape	2015	Cearense	—		12	0	—		—		—		12	0
Maranguape	Total		—		38	0	—		—		6	0	44	0
Uniclinic (loan)	2014	Cearense Série C	—		6	0	—		—		—		6	0
Fortaleza	2015	Série C	0	0	—		0	0	—		3	1	3	1
Fortaleza	2016	Série C	18	0	11	1	6	1	—		5 (Note: Appearance(s) in Copa do Nordeste)	0	40	2
Fortaleza	2017	Série C	21	0	7	0	—		—		2	0	30	0
Fortaleza	2018	Série B	29	4	13	1	—		—		—		42	5
Fortaleza	2019	Série A	30	0	7	0	1	0	—		8	0	46	0
Fortaleza	2020	Série A	33	1	5	0	2	0	2 (Note: Appearance(s) in Copa Sudamericana)	0	7	0	49	1
Fortaleza	2021	Série A	28	0	6	0	8	1	—		3	0	45	1
Fortaleza	2022	Série A	12	0	2	0	3	0	6 (Note: Appearance(s) in Copa Libertadores)	0	7	0	30	0
Fortaleza	Total		171	5	51	2	20	2	8	0	35	1	287	10
Goiás	2023	Série A	0	0	9	1	2	0	2	0	4 (Note: Appearance(s) in Copa Verde)	0	17	1
Sport Recife (loan)	2023	Série B	15	0	—		—		—		—		15	0
Sport Recife (loan)	2024	Série B	32	0	9	0	4	0	—		9	0	54	0
Sport Recife (loan)	Total		47	0	9	0	4	0	—		9	0	69	0
Liaoning Tieren	2025	China League One	27	1	—		1	0	—		—		28	1
Liaoning Tieren	2026	Chinese Super League	25	0	—		0	0	—		—		25	0
Liaoning Tieren	Total		52	1	—		1	0	—		—		53	1
Career total			270	6	113	3	27	2	10	0	54	1	476	12

== Honours ==
Uniclinic

- Campeonato Cearense Série C: 2014

Fortaleza

- Campeonato Brasileiro Série B: 2018
- Copa do Nordeste: 2019, 2022
- Campeonato Cearense: 2016, 2019, 2020, 2021, 2022

Goiás

- Copa Verde: 2023

Liaoning Tieren

- China League One: 2025
