= Juan Sebastián Quintero =

Colombian footballer (born 1995)

Juan Quintero
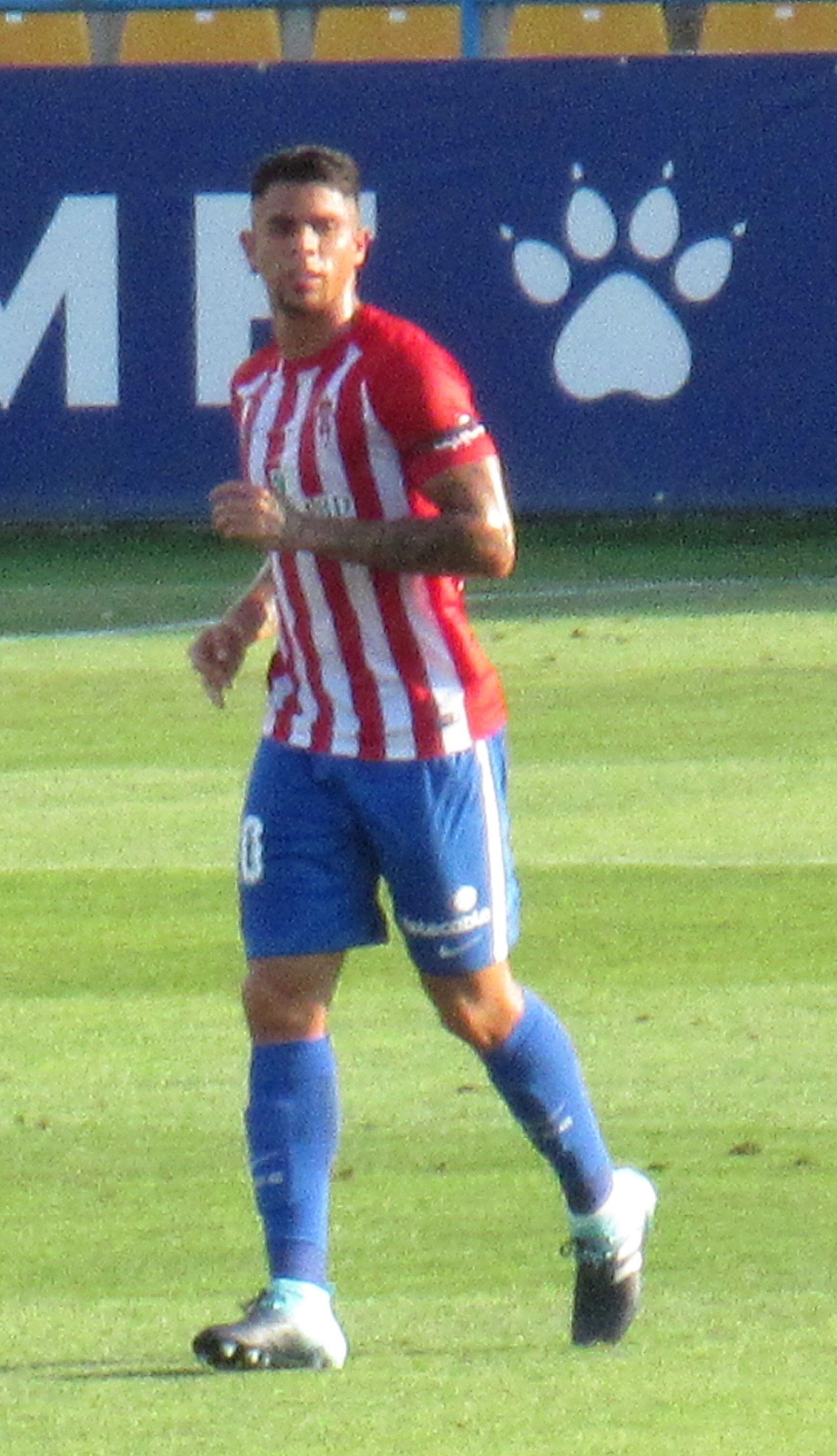
- Quintero playing for Sporting Gijón in 2017

Personal information
- Full name: Juan Sebastián Quintero Fletcher
- Date of birth: 23 March 1995 (age 31)
- Place of birth: Cali, Colombia
- Height: 1.83 m (6 ft 0 in)
- Position: Centre back

Team information
- Current team: Independiente Santa Fe
- Number: 2

Youth career
- 2011–2013: Deportivo Cali

Senior career*
Years	Team	Apps	(Gls)
2013–2018	Deportivo Cali	68	(0)
2017–2018	→ Sporting Gijón (loan)	6	(0)
2019–2022	Fortaleza	96	(2)
2021	→ Juventude (loan)	11	(0)
2022	→ Vasco da Gama (loan)	34	(1)
2023	Deportivo Pereira	22	(0)
2024	Vila Nova	34	(0)
2025	Deportivo Cali	18	(1)
2025–	Deportivo Pereira	7	(0)

International career
2016	Colombia U23	0	(0)
- * Club domestic league appearances and goals as of 12 December 2025

Juan Sebastián Quintero Fletcher (born 23 March 1995) is a Colombian footballer who plays as a centre back for Deportivo Pereira.

== Career ==
=== Deportivo Cali ===
==== Sporting Gijón (loan) ====
On 31 July 2017, after spending four years at Deportivo Cali, the club announced his loan to Sporting de Gijón for one season.

=== Fortaleza ===
On 19 January 2019 Quintero signed with Brazilian Série A club Fortaleza.

== International career ==
He was included among the squad of Colombia Olympic football team at the 2016 Summer Olympics, but never played.

== Personal life ==
In November 2018, Quintero and his brother were shot six times in their car when they were driving around Cali. Finally, both were unharmed.

== Career statistics ==
=== Club ===
As of 7 February 2022

Club	Season	League			Cup		State League		Continental		Other		Total	
Club	Season	Division	Apps	Goals	Apps	Goals	Apps	Goals	Apps	Goals	Apps	Goals	Apps	Goals
Deportivo Cali	2013	Primera A	1	0	0	0	—		—		—		1	0
Deportivo Cali	2014	Primera A	3	0	1	0	—		—		—		4	0
Deportivo Cali	2015	Primera A	11	0	5	0	—		0	0	—		16	0
Deportivo Cali	2016	Primera A	21	0	3	0	—		0	0	2 (Note: Appearance(s) in Superliga Colombiana.)	0	26	0
Deportivo Cali	2017	Primera A	18	0	4	0	—		3 (Note: Appearance(s) in Copa Sudamericana.)	0	–		25	0
Deportivo Cali	2018	Primera A	10	0	2	0	—		1	0	–		13	0
Deportivo Cali	Total		64	0	15	0	—		4	0	2	0	87	0
Sporting de Gijón (loan)	2017–18	Segunda División	5	0	1	0	—		—		—		6	0
Fortaleza	2019	Série A	37	1	2	0	8 (Note: Appearance(s) in Campeonato Cearense.)	0	—		9 (Note: Appearance(s) in Copa do Nordeste.)	1	56	2
Fortaleza	2020	Série A	14	0	0	0	4	0	1	0	8	0	27	0
Fortaleza	2021	Série A	1	0	2	0	4	0	—		6	0	13	0
Fortaleza	Total		52	1	4	0	16	0	1	0	23	1	96	2
Juventude (loan)	2021	Série A	11	0	—		—		—		—		11	0
Career total			132	1	18	0	16	0	5	0	25	1	200	2

== Honours ==
Deportivo Cali

- Categoría Primera A: 2015 Apertura
- Superliga Colombiana: 2014

Fortaleza

- Campeonato Cearense: 2019, 2020, 2021
- Copa do Nordeste: 2019
