= Thiago Cazé =

Brazilian footballer

Personal information
- Full name: Thiago Cazé da Silva
- Date of birth: 12 March 1990 (age 36)
- Place of birth: Brazil
- Height: 1.84 m (6 ft 0 in)
- Position: Defender

Team information
- Current team: Dorchester Town

Senior career*
| Years | Team | Apps | (Gls) |
| 2011 | Ferroviário (CE) | 4 | (0) |
| 2012 | Marília | 3 | (0) |
- Oriente Petrolero B
| 2014 | Lumezzane | 10 | (1) |
| 2015 | Lucchese | 2 | (1) |
| 2015–2017 | Akragas | 39 | (1) |
| 2017–2018 | Carrarese | 13 | (0) |
| 2018 | Weymouth | | |
| 2018–2019 | Crema | | |
| 2019–2020 | Latina | | |
| 2020– | Poole Town | | |
- * Club domestic league appearances and goals

Thiago Cazé da Silva (born 12 March 1990) is a Brazilian footballer who plays as a defender for Dorchester Town in England.

== Career ==
Before the 2012 season, Cazé da Silva signed for Brazilian third division side Marília after playing for Ferroviário (CE) in the Brazilian top flight. After that, he signed for Bolivian third division club Oriente Petrolero B.

In 2014, Cazé da Silva signed for Lumezzane in the Italian third division, where he made 10 league appearances and scored 1 goal. On 10 September 2014, he debuted for Lumezzane during a 0–0 draw with Mantova. On 20 December 2014, Cazé da Silva scored his first goal for Lumezzane during a 3–1 loss to FeralpiSalò.

In the 2015–16 season, Cazé da Silva signed for Akragas in Italy.

Before the second half of 2017–18, he signed for English seventh-division team Weymouth.

In 2018, Cazé da Silva signed for Crema in Italy.

In 2019, Cazé da Silva signed for Latina in Italy.

In 2020, he signed for English seventh division outfit Poole Town.

On 1 October 2021, Cazé da Silva signed for Dorchester Town FC in England.
