= Romarinho (footballer, born 1994) =

Brazilian footballer

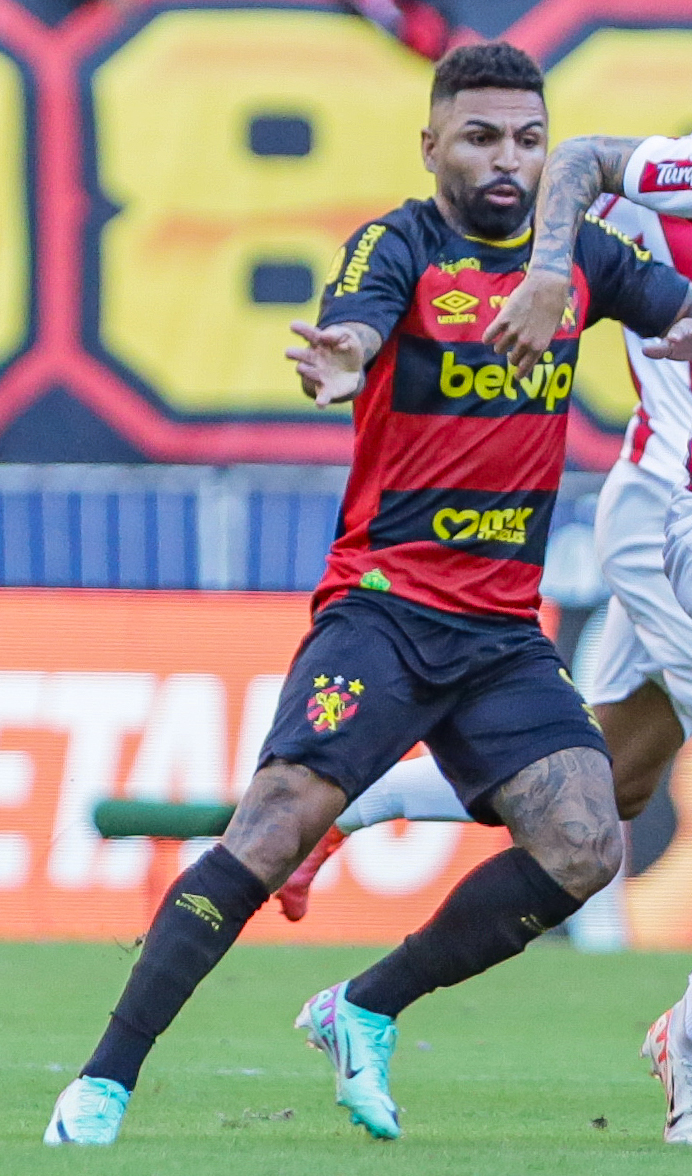
- Romarinho playing for Sport Recife in 2024

Personal information
- Full name: José Romário Silva de Souza
- Date of birth: 1 March 1994 (age 32)
- Place of birth: Ceará-Mirim, Brazil
- Height: 1.68 m (5 ft 6 in)
- Position: Forward

Team information
- Current team: Criciúma
- Number: 11

Youth career
- 2012–2013: ABC

Senior career*
| Years | Team | Apps | (Gls) |
| 2013–2014 | ABC | 2 | (0) |
| 2014–2018 | Globo | 121 | (34) |
| 2015 | → ABC (loan) | 12 | (0) |
| 2016 | → América de Natal (loan) | 6 | (0) |
| 2017–2018 | → Fluminense (loan) | 5 | (0) |
| 2018 | → Fortaleza (loan) | 15 | (0) |
| 2019–2023 | Fortaleza | 237 | (22) |
| 2023–2026 | Sport Recife | 54 | (4) |
| 2026– | Criciúma | 3 | (0) |
- * Club domestic league appearances and goals as of 15 April 2026

José Romário Silva de Souza (born 1 March 1994 in Ceará-Mirim), simply known as Romarinho, is a Brazilian professional footballer who plays as a forward for Criciúma. He has made over 100 competitive appearances for Fortaleza.

== Career statistics ==
As of 11 November 2021

Appearances and goals by club, season and competition
| Club | Season | League | | | State League | | National cup | | Continental | | Other | | Total | |
| Club | Season | Division | Apps | Goals | Apps | Goals | Apps | Goals | Apps | Goals | Apps | Goals | Apps | Goals |
|---|---|---|---|---|---|---|---|---|---|---|---|---|---|---|
| ABC | 2013 | Série B | 0 | 0 | 2 | 0 | 0 | 0 | — | | 1 (Note: Appearance(s) in Copa do Nordeste) | 0 | 3 | 0 |
| Globo | 2014 | Série D | 8 | 0 | 18 | 2 | — | | — | | — | | 26 | 2 |
| Globo | 2015 | Série D | 7 | 3 | 16 | 6 | 1 | 0 | — | | 6 | 0 | 30 | 9 |
| Globo | 2016 | Série D | 8 | 4 | 13 | 5 | 2 | 0 | — | | — | | 23 | 9 |
| Globo | 2017 | Série D | 12 | 3 | 16 | 3 | 1 | 0 | — | | 1 | 0 | 30 | 6 |
| Globo | 2018 | Série C | 17 | 6 | 6 | 2 | 0 | 0 | — | | 3 | 2 | 26 | 10 |
| Globo | Total | | 52 | 16 | 69 | 18 | 4 | 0 | — | | 10 | 2 | 135 | 36 |
| ABC (loan) | 2015 | Série B | 12 | 0 | — | | — | | — | | — | | 12 | 0 |
| América de Natal (loan) | 2016 | Série C | 6 | 0 | — | | — | | — | | — | | 6 | 0 |
| Fluminense (loan) | 2017 | Série A | 4 | 0 | — | | — | | 1 (Note: Appearance(s) in Copa Sudamericana) | 0 | 1 (Note: Appearance(s) in Primeira Liga) | 0 | 6 | 0 |
| Fluminense (loan) | 2018 | Série A | 0 | 0 | 1 | 0 | 0 | 0 | — | | — | | 1 | 0 |
| Fluminense (loan) | Total | | 4 | 0 | 1 | 0 | 0 | 0 | 1 | 0 | 1 | 0 | 7 | 0 |
| Fortaleza | 2018 | Série B | 14 | 0 | — | | — | | — | | — | | 14 | 0 |
| Fortaleza | 2019 | Série A | 32 | 3 | 6 | 0 | 2 | 0 | — | | 10 | 1 | 50 | 4 |
| Fortaleza | 2020 | Série A | 34 | 4 | 9 | 1 | 2 | 0 | 2 | 0 | 10 | 0 | 57 | 5 |
| Fortaleza | 2021 | Série A | 27 | 0 | 5 | 3 | 7 | 2 | — | | 7 | 0 | 46 | 5 |
| Fortaleza | Total | | 107 | 7 | 20 | 4 | 11 | 2 | 2 | 0 | 27 | 1 | 167 | 14 |
| Career total | | | 181 | 23 | 92 | 22 | 15 | 2 | 3 | 0 | 39 | 3 | 330 | 50 |

== Honours ==
Fortaleza

- Campeonato Brasileiro Série B: 2018
- Campeonato Cearense: 2019, 2020, 2021, 2022, 2023
- Copa do Nordeste: 2019, 2022
