= Tinga (footballer, born 1993) =

Brazilian footballer

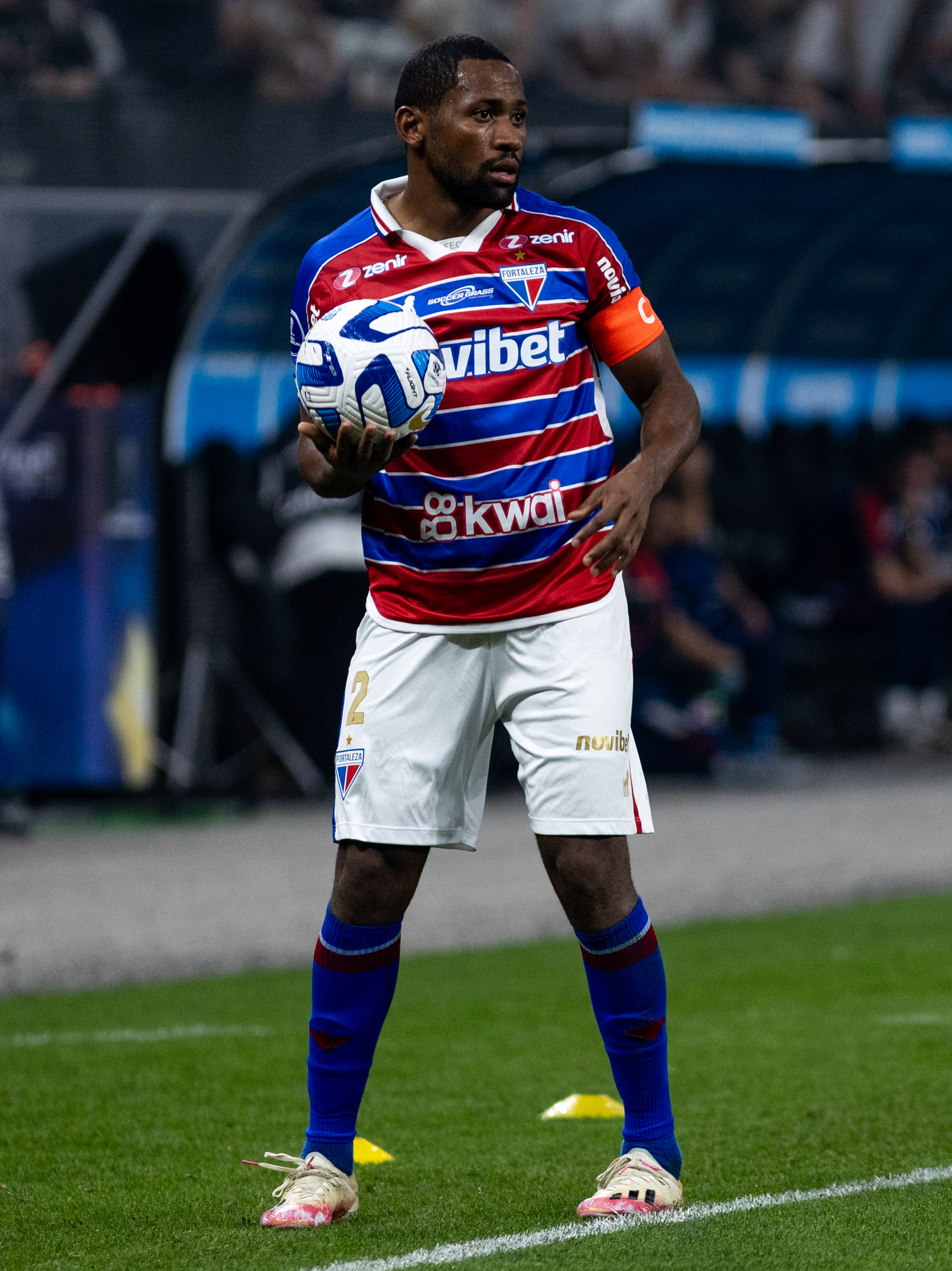
- Tinga with Fortaleza in 2023

Personal information
- Full name: Guilherme de Jesus da Silva
- Date of birth: 1 September 1993 (age 33)
- Place of birth: Porto Alegre, Brazil
- Height: 1.79 m (5 ft 10 1/2 in)
- Position: Right back

Team information
- Current team: Coritiba
- Number: 2

Youth career
- –2013: Grêmio

Senior career*
Years	Team	Apps	(Gls)
2013–2017	Grêmio	7	(0)
2014	→ Boa Esporte (loan)	18	(0)
2015	→ Fortaleza (loan)	31	(2)
2016–2017	→ Bahia (loan)	30	(0)
2017	Juventude	21	(0)
2018–2025	Fortaleza	389	(26)
2026–	Coritiba	11	(0)

International career
2013	Brazil U20	3	(0)
Medal record
Representing Brazil
Men's Football
Pan American Games
Bronze medal – third place	2015 Toronto	Team competition
- * Club domestic league appearances and goals as of 7 April 2026

Guilherme de Jesus da Silva (born 1 September 1993), commonly known as Tinga, is a Brazilian professional footballer who plays as a right back for Coritiba.

== Club career ==
In August 2014, Tinga was loaned by Grêmio to Série B side Boa Esporte to gain experience until the end of the Brazilian season. He made his debut for the new club on 27 August, in a 2–0 home win against Icasa.

== Career statistics ==
As of 10 November 2021.

Club	Season	League			State League		Cup		Continental		Other		Total	
Club	Season	Division	Apps	Goals	Apps	Goals	Apps	Goals	Apps	Goals	Apps	Goals	Apps	Goals
Grêmio	2013	Série A	0	0	4	0	0	0	0	0	—		4	0
Grêmio	2014	Série A	0	0	3	0	0	0	0	0	—		3	0
Grêmio	Total		0	0	7	0	0	0	0	0	—		7	0
Boa Esporte (loan)	2014	Série B	18	0	—		—		—		—		18	0
Fortaleza (loan)	2015	Série C	14	1	7	0	4	1	—		6 (Note: Appearance(s) in Copa do Nordeste)	0	31	2
Bahia	2016	Série B	20	0	4	0	2	0	—		4	0	30	0
Juventude	2017	Série B	21	0	—		—		—		—		21	0
Fortaleza	2018	Série B	32	2	17	3	—		—		—		49	5
Fortaleza	2019	Série A	23	4	10	1	2	0	—		8	0	43	5
Fortaleza	2020	Série A	28	0	7	3	2	1	2 (Note: Appearance(s) in Copa Sudamericana)	0	4	1	43	5
Fortaleza	2021	Série A	28	1	6	0	8	0	—		5	0	47	1
Fortaleza	Total		111	7	40	7	12	1	2	0	17	1	182	16
Career total			184	8	58	7	18	2	2	0	27	1	289	18

== Honours ==
=== Club ===
Fortaleza

- Campeonato Cearense: 2015, 2019, 2020, 2021, 2022, 2023
- Campeonato Brasileiro Série B: 2018
- Copa do Nordeste: 2019, 2022, 2024

=== International ===
Brazil U20

- Toulon Tournament: 2013
