= Estádio Presidente Vargas (Ceará) =

Football stadium in Fortaleza, Brazil

Coordinates: 3°44′45″S 38°32′12″W

- PV
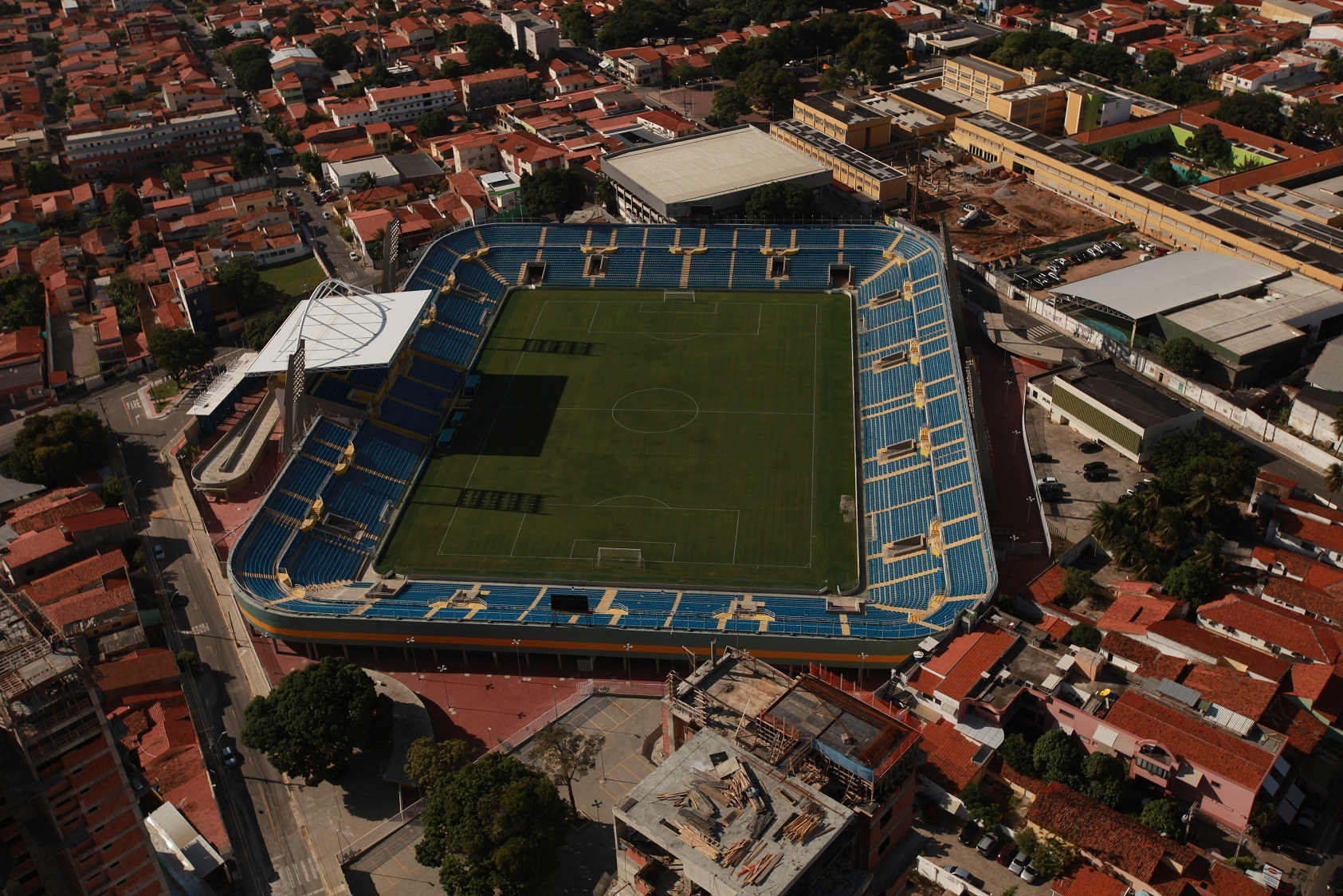
- Aerial view of the stadium Sisbrace
- Interactive map of Estádio Presidente Vargas
- Full name: Estádio Municipal Presidente Getúlio Vargas
- Location: Fortaleza, Ceará, Brazil
- Owner: Fortaleza City Hall
- Capacity: 20,600
- Surface: Grass
- Field size: 105 x 68

Construction
- Opened: September 21, 1941
- Renovated: 2008-2011

Tenants
- América (CE); Ferroviário (CE); Fortaleza (1941–1973, 2011–2012); Associação Esportiva Tiradentes; Ceará (1941–1973, 2011–2012); Floresta

The Estádio Presidente Vargas, nicknamed PV, is a multi-purpose stadium located in Fortaleza, Ceará, Brazil. It is currently used mostly for association football matches and also sometimes for American football matches. The venue is the home of América Football Club (CE), Fortaleza, Ferroviário Atlético Clube and Associação Esportiva Tiradentes. The stadium has a capacity of 20,000 and it was built in 1941. The stadium is owned by the Fortaleza City Hall and it is named after Brazilian president Getúlio Vargas.

The stadium was the largest stadium in Fortaleza until 1973 when the Castelão stadium was inaugurated.

== History ==
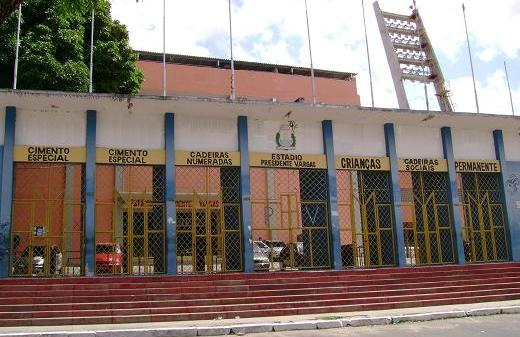
Exterior of the stadium

The Presidente Vargas Stadium was built in 1941 and was considered a modern facility at the time. The stadium was walled, had wooden grandstands and a wooden fence separating the field from fans, and a grass pitch (until then all fields in the city had clay which was moistened before games). This stadium was officially opened on September 14 of 1941, but the first match took place a week later, on September 21, when Ferroviário beat Tramways of Pernambuco 1–0.

== Attendance ==
The stadium's attendance record currently stands at 38,515, set on May 7, 1989, when Ferroviário and Ceará drew 1-1. But there are records of an audience of 41,099 in the game Ceará 0-1 Corinthians Brazilian Championship in 1971 but there is no confirmation that this has been official. Currently, due to renovations in the stadium and the strictest safety standards, the capacity was reduced to 22,000 spectators.

== Renovation ==
Between February 2008 and April 2011, the stadium was banned from making a series of improvements. The work, budgeted at R $48 million, foresaw the reconstruction of the roof over the social chairs, radio and TV booths, in addition to the renovation of the historic facade, the tunnels and access ramps, the changing rooms, the administration rooms, the parking lot and the press room, as well as the installation of an electronic scoreboard and glass fencing. The renovation of the Presidente Vargas stadium also included changing the entire electrical and hydro-sanitary system, the chairs and structural beams, and a new pitch.

Initially, of the newly installed seats, 8% were orange and the others blue. However, the two juxtaposed colors were relatively reminiscent of the colors of Fortaleza Esporte Clube, thus generating disagreement between some fans of rival Ceará Sporting Club. To avoid future problems, the 522 orange chairs were removed and transferred to the Estadio Antony Costa, which was also under renovation at the time. Blue chairs replaced the withdrawn seats.

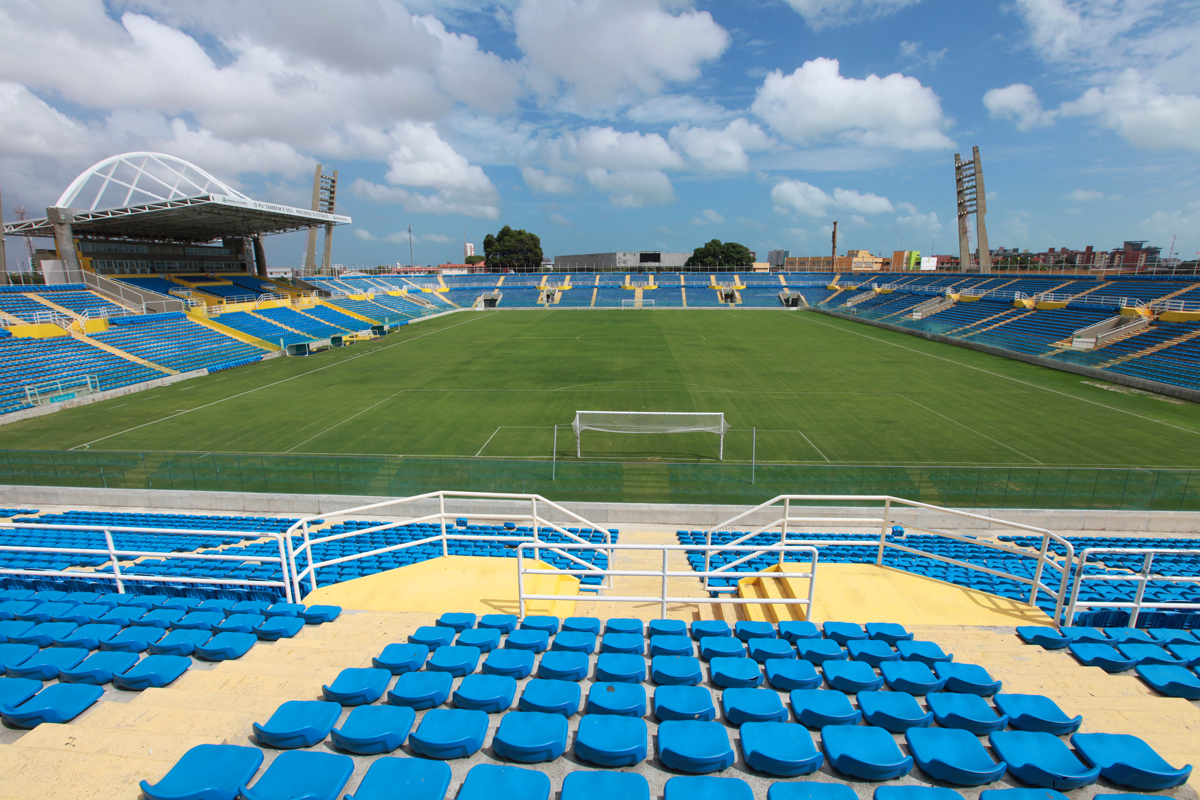
View of the stadium looking towards the field after renovation

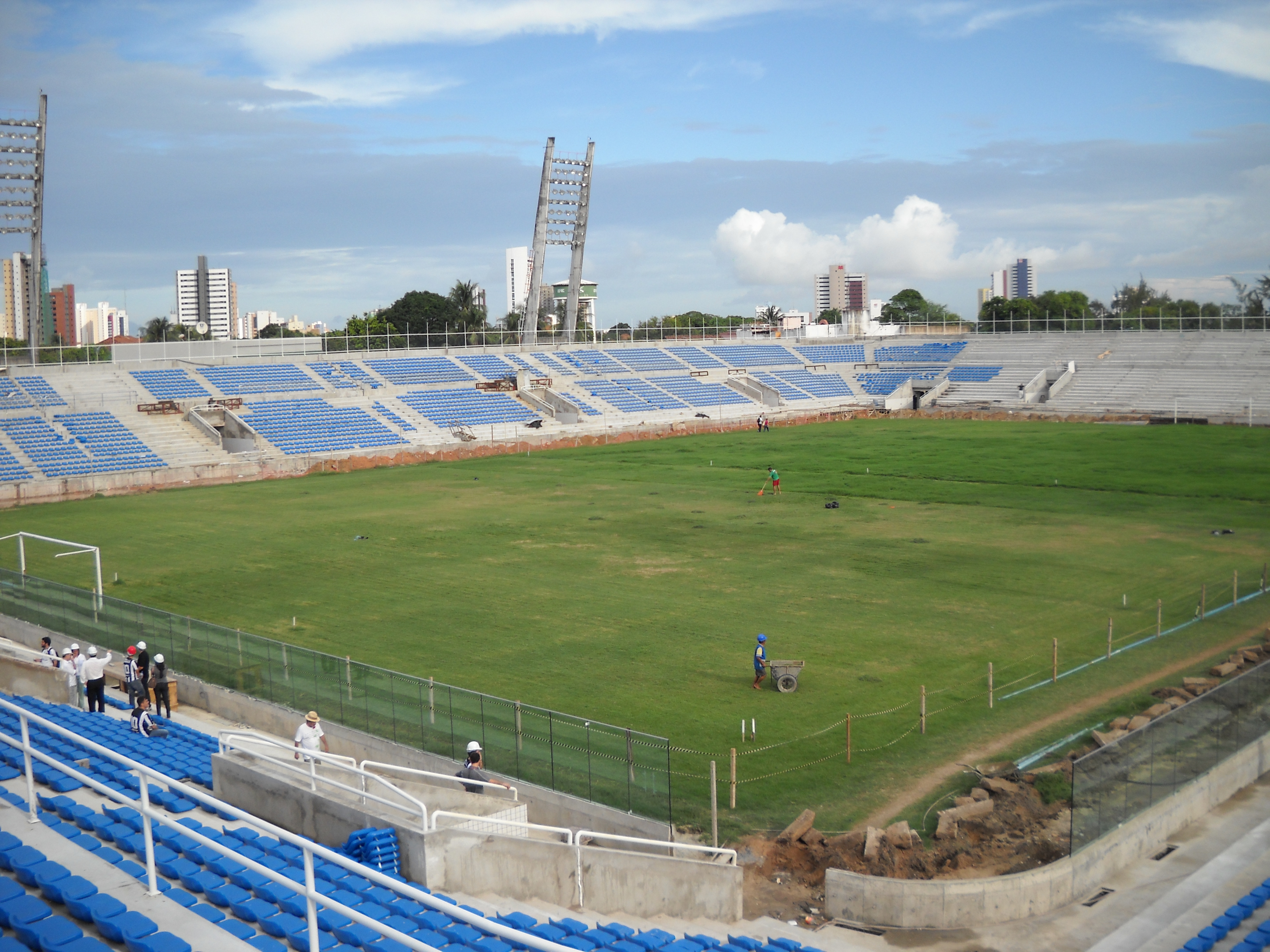
The stadium undergoing renovation

The PV was the main stadium of football in Ceará until the reopening of Castelão, in 2013, after the remodeling for the FIFA World Cup and FIFA Confederations Cup. The Caldeirão was also one of the training centers for the 2014 World Cup and the 2013 Confederations Cup.

The stadium has the tradition of receiving the greatest rivalries of Ceará football, such as the King Clasico (Ceará vs Fortaleza), the Peace Clasico (Ferroviário vs Ceará) and the Clasico of Colors (Fortaleza vs Ferroviário). In addition to such games, the stadium has also hosted games of the Copa do Brasil, and the Série B and Série C, the 2nd and 3rd divisions of the Brazilian league system.
