= Vitor Ricardo =

Brazilian footballer

Personal information
- Full name: Vitor Ricardo Guerra Candido Wach
- Date of birth: 14 April 2000 (age 26)
- Place of birth: Rio de Janeiro, Brazil
- Height: 1.78 m (5 ft 10 in)
- Position: Right back

Team information
- Current team: Figueirense
- Number: 22

Youth career
- 2017–2019: Flamengo
- 2019–2020: Palmeiras
- 2020–2021: Fortaleza

Senior career*
Years	Team	Apps	(Gls)
2021–	Fortaleza	2	(0)
2023	→ Aparecidense (loan)	13	(2)
2023	→ Ferroviária (loan)	18	(0)
2024	São Bernardo	21	(1)
2025	Boavista	10	(0)
2025	Pouso Alegre	6	(0)
2026	Botafogo-PB	4	(0)
2026–	Figueirense	10	(0)
- * Club domestic league appearances and goals as of 10 November 2026

Vitor Ricardo Guerra Candido Wach (born 14 April 2000), known as Vitor Ricardo, is a Brazilian professional footballer who plays as a right back for Figueirense.

== Club career ==
Born in Rio de Janeiro, Vitor Ricardo was a Flamengo youth graduate, but left the club in August 2019 to join Palmeiras. He left the latter in 2020, and signed for Fortaleza.

Vitor Ricardo made his first team debut for Leão on 13 March 2021, starting in a 1–1 home draw against Treze, for the year's Copa do Nordeste. Initially assigned to the under-23 squad, he was definitely promoted to the main squad in January 2022.

Vitor Ricardo made his Série A debut on 10 April 2022, starting in a 0–1 home loss against Cuiabá.

== Career statistics ==
As of 11 April 2022

Club	Season	League			State League		Cup		Continental		Other		Total	
Club	Season	Division	Apps	Goals	Apps	Goals	Apps	Goals	Apps	Goals	Apps	Goals	Apps	Goals
Fortaleza	2021	Série A	0	0	0	0	0	0	—		1 (Note: Appearance(s) in Copa do Nordeste)	0	1	0
Fortaleza	2022	Série A	1	0	0	0	0	0	0	0	0	0	1	0
Career total			1	0	0	0	0	0	0	0	1	0	2	0

== Honours ==
Fortaleza

- Copa do Nordeste: 2022
- Campeonato Cearense: 2022
