= Vera Cruz, Rio Grande do Sul =

Municipality of Rio Grande do Sul, Brazil

Vera Cruz
- Municipality
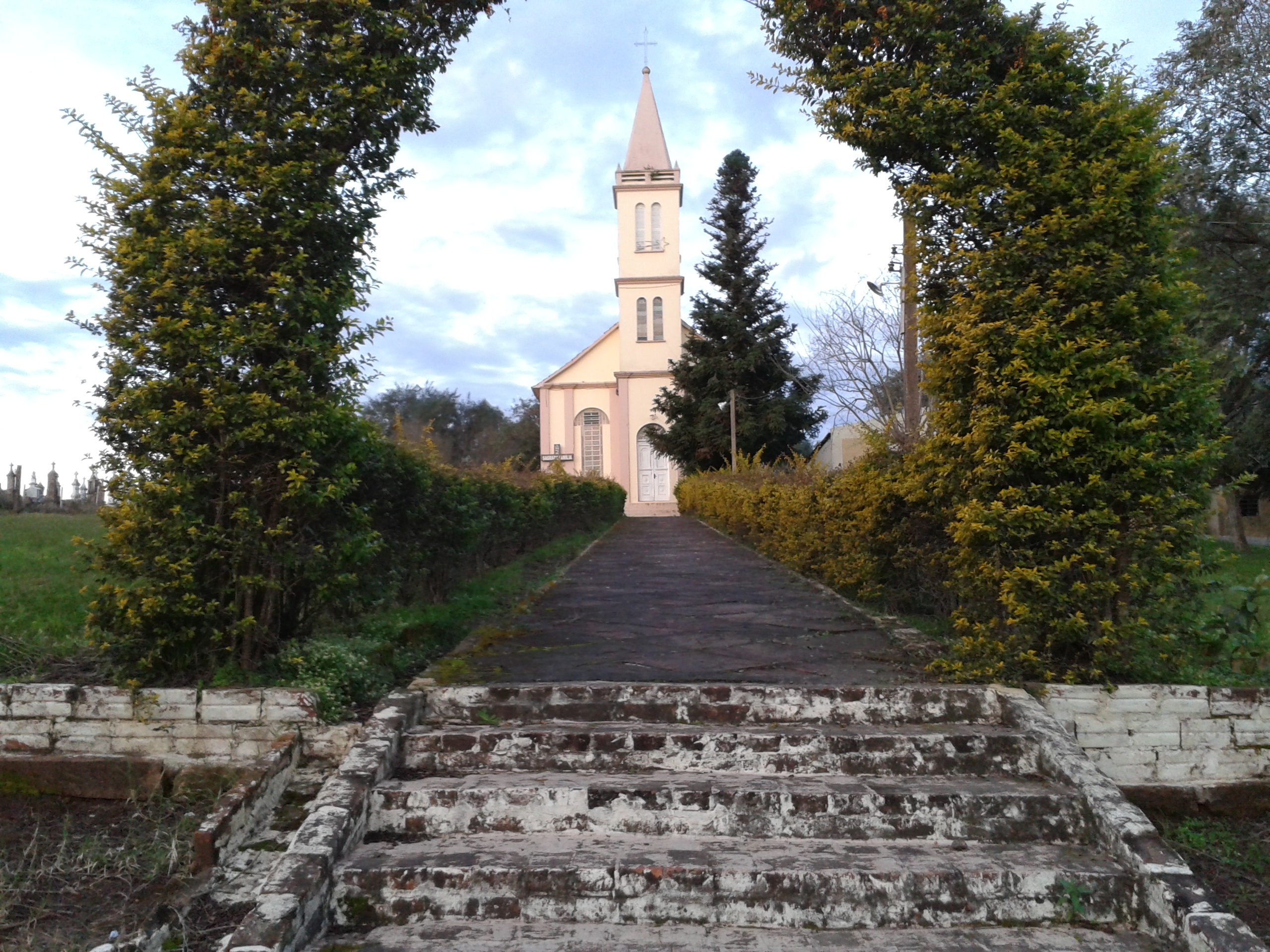
- Church in Vila Progresso, Vera Cruz

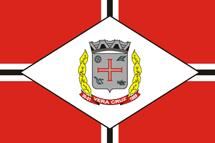
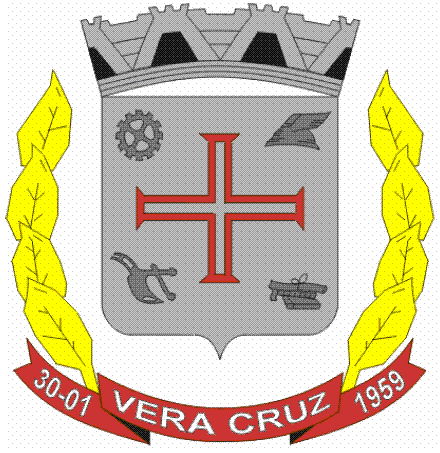
- Flag Coat of arms

- Location within Rio Grande do Sul

- Location in Brazil
- Coordinates: 29.715°S 52.5058°W
- Country: Brazil
- State: Rio Grande do Sul
- Founded: 07 June 1959

Population (2020)
  - Total: 27,099
- Time zone: UTC−3 (BRT)

Vera Cruz is a municipality in the Brazilian state of Rio Grande do Sul. It was founded on 7 June 1959 and it has a population of 27,099 as of 2020.

== See also ==
- List of municipalities in Rio Grande do Sul
