= 2019 Copa do Nordeste =

Tournament details
- Country: Brazil
- Dates: 15 January – 29 May
- Teams: 16

Final positions
- Champions: Fortaleza
- Runners-up: Botafogo-PB
- 2020 Copa do Brasil: Fortaleza

Tournament statistics
- Matches played: 72
- Goals scored: 156 (2.17 per match)
- Top goal scorer(s): Gilberto; Júnior Santos (8 goals each)

Awards
- Best player: Edinho

The 2019 Copa do Nordeste was the 16th edition of the main football tournament featuring teams from the Brazilian Northeast Region. The competition featured 16 clubs, with Bahia, Ceará and Pernambuco having two seeds each, and Rio Grande do Norte, Sergipe, Alagoas, Paraíba, Maranhão and Piauí with one seed each. Four teams were decided by a qualifying tournament (Pré-Copa do Nordeste).

In the finals, Fortaleza defeated Botafogo-PB 2–0 on aggregate to win their first Copa do Nordeste title. As champions, Fortaleza qualified for the Round of 16 of the 2020 Copa do Brasil.

Sampaio Corrêa were the defending champions, but were eliminated in the group stage.

== Format changes ==
In this season, 12 teams (9 state league champions and best placed teams in the 2018 CBF ranking from Bahia, Ceará and Pernambuco) gained direct entries into the group stage while the other four berths were decided by the Pré-Copa do Nordeste.

For the group stage, the 16 teams were drawn into two groups. Each team played once against the eight clubs from the other group. Top four teams qualified for the final stages. Quarter-finals and semi-finals were played on a single-leg basis and finals were played on a home-and-away two-legged basis.

== Teams ==
=== 2019 Pré-Copa do Nordeste ===
The 2019 Pré-Copa do Nordeste was the qualifying tournament of 2019 Copa do Nordeste. It was played from 18 April to 1 May 2018. Best placed team in the 2018 CBF ranking not already qualified from Alagoas, Bahia, Maranhão, Paraíba, Pernambuco, Piauí, Rio Grande do Norte and Sergipe competed to decide four places in the Copa do Nordeste.

==== Draw ====
The draw was held on 9 April 2018, 15:00, at the CBF headquarters in Rio de Janeiro. Teams were seeded by their 2018 CBF ranking (shown in parentheses). The eight teams were drawn into four ties, with the Pot A teams hosting the second leg.

2019 Pré-Copa do Nordeste draw
Pot A	Pot B
(Alagoas) CRB (36); (Maranhão) Sampaio Corrêa (39); (Rio Grande do Norte) América de Natal (43); (Pernambuco) Salgueiro (51)	(Sergipe) Confiança (54); (Piauí) Ríver^{[1]} (60); (Paraíba) Campinense (70); (Bahia) Juazeirense (82)

^{1} The identity of Piauí team was not known at the time of the draw.

Each tie was played on a home-and-away two-legged basis. If tied on aggregate, the away goals rule would not be used, extra time would not be played, and the penalty shoot-out would be used to determine the winner (Regulations Pré-Copa do Nordeste Article 9).

==== Matches ====
Team 1	Agg.	Team 2	1st leg	2nd leg
Ríver (Piauí)	2–5	(Maranhão) Sampaio Corrêa	2–2	0–3
Confiança (Sergipe)	5–3	(Rio Grande do Norte) América de Natal	3–3	2–0
Juazeirense (Bahia)	2–3	(Pernambuco) Salgueiro	1–1	1–2
Campinense (Paraíba)	2–3	(Alagoas) CRB	1–0	1–3

Sampaio Corrêa, Confiança, Salgueiro and CRB qualified for 2019 Copa do Nordeste.

=== Qualified teams ===
Association	Team	Qualification method
(Alagoas) Alagoas; 1 + 1 berths	CSA	2018 Campeonato Alagoano champions
(Alagoas) Alagoas; 1 + 1 berths	CRB	2019 Pré-Copa do Nordeste
(Bahia) Bahia; 2 berths	Bahia	2018 Campeonato Baiano champions
(Bahia) Bahia; 2 berths	Vitória	best placed team in the 2018 CBF ranking not already qualified
(Ceará) Ceará; 2 berths	Ceará	2018 Campeonato Cearense champions
(Ceará) Ceará; 2 berths	Fortaleza	best placed team in the 2018 CBF ranking not already qualified
(Maranhão) Maranhão; 1 + 1 berths	Moto Club	2018 Campeonato Maranhense champions
(Maranhão) Maranhão; 1 + 1 berths	Sampaio Corrêa	2019 Pré-Copa do Nordeste
(Paraíba) Paraíba; 1 berth	Botafogo-PB	2018 Campeonato Paraibano champions
Pernambuco^{[a]} 2 + 1 berths	Náutico	2018 Campeonato Pernambucano champions
Pernambuco^{[a]} 2 + 1 berths	Santa Cruz	best second-placed team in the 2018 CBF ranking not already qualified
Pernambuco^{[a]} 2 + 1 berths	Salgueiro	2019 Pré-Copa do Nordeste
(Piauí) Piauí; 1 berth	Altos	2018 Campeonato Piauiense champions
(Rio Grande do Norte) Rio Grande do Norte; 1 berth	ABC	2018 Campeonato Potiguar champions
(Sergipe) Sergipe; 1 + 1 berths	Sergipe	2018 Campeonato Sergipano champions
(Sergipe) Sergipe; 1 + 1 berths	Confiança	2019 Pré-Copa do Nordeste

^{a} Sport, Pernambuco best placed team in the 2018 CBF ranking, declined to participate in the Copa do Nordeste. They were replaced by Santa Cruz. Salgueiro (best fourth-placed team) entered the Pré-Copa do Nordeste.

== Schedule ==
The schedule of the competition was as follows.

Stage	First leg	Second leg
Group Stage	Round 1: 15–17 January	
Group Stage	Round 2: 19, 22 and 26–28 January	
Group Stage	Round 3: 2–3 and 9 February	
Group Stage	Round 4: 9, 16–17 and 24 February	
Group Stage	Round 5: 2 and 7 March	
Group Stage	Round 6: 10, 13–14 and 16–17 March	
Group Stage	Round 7: 23–24 March	
Group Stage	Round 8: 30 March	
Quarter-finals	6–8 April	
Semi-finals	9 May	
Finals	23 May	29 May

== Draw ==
The draw for the group stage was held on 4 October 2018, 20:00, at Teatro Gustavo Leite in Maceió. The 16 teams were drawn into two groups of eight containing two teams from each of the four pots with the restriction that teams from the same federation (except Salgueiro) could not be drawn into the same group. Teams were seeded by their 2018 CBF ranking (shown in parentheses).

Group stage draw
Pot 1	Pot 2	Pot 3	Pot 4
(Bahia) Vitória (18); Bahia (21); (Pernambuco) Santa Cruz (25); Ceará (27)	(Rio Grande do Norte) ABC (31); (Pernambuco) Náutico (32); (Alagoas) CRB (36); (Maranhão) Sampaio Corrêa (39)	(Ceará) Fortaleza (42); (Paraíba) Botafogo-PB (45); (Pernambuco) Salgueiro (51); (Sergipe) Confiança (54)	(Alagoas) CSA (59); (Maranhão) Moto Club (66); (Piauí) Altos (98); Sergipe (99)

A second draw to determine the home-and-away teams for matches between same-state clubs was held on 15 October 2018 at CBF headquarters in Rio de Janeiro.

== Group stage ==
For the group stage, the 16 teams were drawn into two groups of eight teams each. Each team played on a single round-robin tournament against the eight clubs from the other group. The top four teams of each group advanced to the quarter-finals of the knockout stages. The teams were ranked according to points (3 points for a win, 1 point for a draw, and 0 points for a loss). If tied on points, the following criteria would be used to determine the ranking: 1. Wins; 2. Goal difference; 3. Goals scored; 4. Fewest red cards; 5. Fewest yellow cards; 6. Draw in the headquarters of the Brazilian Football Confederation (Regulations Article 10).

=== Group A ===
Pos	Team	Pld	W	D	L	GF	GA	GD	Pts	Qualification
1	(Ceará) Fortaleza	8	3	4	1	12	6	+6	13	Advance to Quarter-finals
2	(Pernambuco) Santa Cruz	8	3	3	2	9	8	+1	12	Advance to Quarter-finals
3	(Alagoas) CRB	8	1	6	1	6	5	+1	9	Advance to Quarter-finals
4	(Bahia) Vitória	8	0	7	1	8	10	−2	7	Advance to Quarter-finals
5	(Pernambuco) Salgueiro	8	1	3	4	5	13	−8	6	
6	(Maranhão) Sampaio Corrêa	8	1	1	6	4	15	−11	4	
7	Sergipe	8	1	0	7	4	13	−9	3	
8	(Piauí) Altos	8	0	2	6	4	16	−12	2	

Source: CBF

=== Group B ===
Pos	Team	Pld	W	D	L	GF	GA	GD	Pts	Qualification
1	Ceará	8	5	3	0	15	5	+10	18	Advance to Quarter-finals
2	(Paraíba) Botafogo-PB	8	5	3	0	10	3	+7	18	Advance to Quarter-finals
3	(Alagoas) CSA	8	4	4	0	10	3	+7	16	Advance to Quarter-finals
4	(Pernambuco) Náutico	8	4	3	1	13	9	+4	15	Advance to Quarter-finals
5	Bahia	8	3	3	2	15	7	+8	12	
6	(Rio Grande do Norte) ABC	8	3	3	2	8	5	+3	12	
7	(Maranhão) Moto Club	8	2	5	1	9	7	+2	11	
8	(Sergipe) Confiança	8	2	2	4	6	13	−7	8	

Source: CBF

=== Results ===
Home \ Away	ABC	BAH	BOT	CEA	CON	CSA	MOT	NAU
(Piauí) Altos	1–1	0–5			0–1	1–2		
(Alagoas) CRB			0–0	0–0			2–2	1–2
(Ceará) Fortaleza	1–0	2–2			4–0	0–0		
(Pernambuco) Salgueiro			1–1	1–3			0–0	1–1
(Maranhão) Sampaio Corrêa	0–1	1–0			2–2	0–3		
(Pernambuco) Santa Cruz	1–0	1–3			2–0	1–1		
Sergipe			1–2	0–1			1–3	0–2
(Bahia) Vitória			1–3	1–1			1–1	1–1

Home \ Away	ALT	CRB	FOR	SAL	SAM	SAN	SER	VIT
(Rio Grande do Norte) ABC		0–0		4–1			2–1	0–0
Bahia		1–1		3–0			0–1	1–1
(Paraíba) Botafogo-PB	2–0		1–0		1–0	0–0		
Ceará	2–1		1–1		5–0	2–1		
(Sergipe) Confiança		0–2		0–1			1–0	2–2
(Alagoas) CSA		0–0		1–0			2–0	1–1
(Maranhão) Moto Club	1–1		1–1		1–0	0–1		
(Pernambuco) Náutico	2–0		1–3		2–1	2–2		

Source: CBF
Legend: Blue = home team win; Yellow = draw; Red = away team win.

== Final stages ==
Starting from the quarter-finals, the teams played a single-elimination tournament with the following rules:

- Quarter-finals and semi-finals were played on a single-leg basis, with the higher-seeded team hosting the leg.
  - If tied, the penalty shoot-out would be used to determine the winner (Regulations Article 11).
- Finals were played on a home-and-away two-legged basis, with the higher-seeded team hosting the second leg.
  - If tied on aggregate, the penalty shoot-out would be used to determine the winner (Regulations Article 12).
- Extra time would be not played and away goals rule would be not used in final stages.

Starting from the semi-finals, the teams were seeded according to their performance in the tournament. The teams were ranked according to overall points. If tied on overall points, the following criteria would be used to determine the ranking: 1. Overall wins; 2. Overall goal difference; 3. Draw in the headquarters of the Brazilian Football Confederation (Regulations Article 17).

=== Bracket ===
Quarter-finals
(Ceará)	Fortaleza	4
(Bahia)	Vitória	0
(Pernambuco)	Santa Cruz (p)	1 (8)
(Alagoas)	CRB	1 (7)
(Paraíba)	Botafogo-PB	3
(Alagoas)	CSA	1
(Ceará)	Ceará	0
(Pernambuco)	Náutico	2

Semi-finals
(Ceará)	Fortaleza	1
(Pernambuco)	Santa Cruz	0
(Paraíba)	Botafogo-PB	2
(Pernambuco)	Náutico	1

Finals
(Ceará)	Fortaleza	1	1	2
(Paraíba)	Botafogo-PB	0	0	0

=== Quarter-finals ===
Team 1	Score	Team 2
Fortaleza (Ceará)	4–0	(Bahia) Vitória
Santa Cruz (Pernambuco)	1–1 (8–7 p)	(Alagoas) CRB
Ceará	0–2	(Pernambuco) Náutico
Botafogo-PB (Paraíba)	3–1	(Alagoas) CSA

==== Matches ====
8 April 2019
21:30

Fortaleza (Ceará)	4–0	(Bahia) Vitória
Júnior Santos 27', 35'; Edinho 83'; Dodô 90'	Report

Castelão, Fortaleza
Attendance: 29,565
Referee: Marcelo Aparecido Ribeiro de Souza (Paraíba)

6 April 2019
20:00

Santa Cruz (Pernambuco)	1–1	(Alagoas) CRB
William Alves 90+2'	Report	William Barbio 86'
Penalties
Pipico (penalty scored); Charles (penalty scored); Carlos Renato (penalty scored); Dudu (penalty scored); William Alves (penalty scored); Augusto Potiguar (penalty scored); Ítalo Henrique (penalty scored); Allan Dias (penalty scored)	8–7	(penalty scored) Zé Carlos; (penalty scored) Ferrugem; (penalty scored) Daniel Borges; (penalty scored) William Barbio; (penalty scored) Felipe Menezes; (penalty scored) Guilherme Mattis; (penalty scored) Igor; (penalty missed) Mailson

Estádio do Arruda, Recife
Attendance: 8,018
Referee: Cláudio Francisco Lima e Silva (Sergipe)

6 April 2019
18:30

Ceará	0–2	(Pernambuco) Náutico
	Report	Valdo 76' (o.g.); Thiago 90'

Castelão, Fortaleza
Attendance: 35,140
Referee: Antônio Dib Moraes de Sousa (Piauí)

7 April 2019
18:00

Botafogo-PB (Paraíba)	3–1	(Alagoas) CSA
Clayton 49'; Nando 52'; Dico 86'	Report	Robinho 64'

Almeidão, João Pessoa
Attendance: 7,544
Referee: Diego Pombo Lopez (Bahia)

=== Semi-finals ===
Pos	Team	Pld	W	D	L	GF	GA	GD	Pts	Host
3	(Ceará) Fortaleza	9	4	4	1	16	6	+10	16	Host
4	(Pernambuco) Santa Cruz	9	3	4	2	10	9	+1	13	
1	(Paraíba) Botafogo-PB	9	6	3	0	13	4	+9	21	Host
2	(Pernambuco) Náutico	9	5	3	1	15	9	+6	18	

Source: CBF

Team 1	Score	Team 2
Fortaleza (Ceará)	1–0	(Pernambuco) Santa Cruz
Botafogo-PB (Paraíba)	2–1	(Pernambuco) Náutico

==== Matches ====
9 May 2019
21:30

Fortaleza (Ceará)	1–0	(Pernambuco) Santa Cruz
Romarinho 77'	Report

Castelão, Fortaleza
Attendance: 30,495
Referee: Marielson Alves Silva (Bahia)

9 May 2019
19:15

Botafogo-PB (Paraíba)	2–1	(Pernambuco) Náutico
Nando 55'; Juninho 89'	Report	Fábio Alves 60' (o.g.)

Almeidão, João Pessoa
Attendance: 8,462
Referee: Pablo Ramon Gonçalves Pinheiro (Rio Grande do Norte)

=== Finals ===
Pos	Team	Pld	W	D	L	GF	GA	GD	Pts	Host
1	(Paraíba) Botafogo-PB	10	7	3	0	15	5	+10	24	2nd leg
2	(Ceará) Fortaleza	10	5	4	1	17	6	+11	19	1st leg

Source: CBF

Team 1	Agg.	Team 2	1st leg	2nd leg
Fortaleza (Ceará)	2–0	(Paraíba) Botafogo-PB	1–0	1–0

==== Matches ====
23 May 2019
21:30

Fortaleza (Ceará)	1–0	(Paraíba) Botafogo-PB
Wellington Paulista 78'	Report

Castelão, Fortaleza
Attendance: 38,070
Referee: Diego Pombo Lopez (Bahia)

29 May 2019
20:00

Botafogo-PB (Paraíba)	0–1	(Ceará) Fortaleza
	Report	Wellington Paulista 3'

Almeidão, João Pessoa
Attendance: 17,518
Referee: Caio Max Augusto Vieira (Rio Grande do Norte)

2019 Copa do Nordeste
Champions

Fortaleza
1st title

== Top goalscorers ==
Rank	Player	Team	Goals
1	(Brazil) Gilberto	Bahia	8
1	(Brazil) Júnior Santos	(Ceará) Fortaleza	8
3	(Brazil) Marcos Aurélio	(Paraíba) Botafogo-PB	5
4	(Brazil) Patrick Fabiano	(Alagoas) CSA	4
4	(Brazil) Pipico	(Pernambuco) Santa Cruz	4
4	(Brazil) Wallace Pernambucano	(Pernambuco) Náutico	4
7	(Brazil) Edinho	(Ceará) Fortaleza	3
7	(Brazil) Felipe Baxola	Ceará	3
7	(Brazil) Márcio Diogo	(Maranhão) Moto Club	3
7	(Brazil) Maxuell Samurai	(Maranhão) Sampaio Corrêa	3
7	(Brazil) Nando	(Paraíba) Botafogo-PB	3
7	(Brazil) Ricardo Bueno	Ceará	3

Source:CBF

== 2019 Copa do Nordeste team ==
The 2019 Copa do Nordeste team was a squad consisting of the eleven most impressive players at the tournament.

Pos.	Player	Team
GK	(Brazil) Marcelo Boeck	(Ceará) Fortaleza
DF	(Brazil) Tinga	(Ceará) Fortaleza
DF	(Colombia) Juan Sebastián Quintero	(Ceará) Fortaleza
DF	(Brazil) Roger Carvalho	(Ceará) Fortaleza
DF	(Brazil) Carlinhos	(Ceará) Fortaleza
MF	(Brazil) Gregore	Bahia
MF	(Brazil) Marcos Aurélio	(Paraíba) Botafogo-PB
MF	(Brazil) Marcos Vinícius	(Paraíba) Botafogo-PB
FW	(Brazil) Edinho ^{a}	(Ceará) Fortaleza
FW	(Brazil) Júnior Santos ^{b}	(Ceará) Fortaleza
FW	(Brazil) Osvaldo	(Ceará) Fortaleza
Head coach	(Brazil) Rogério Ceni	(Ceará) Fortaleza

a.Best player
b.Top scorer (shared with Gilberto)

Head coach
(Brazil) Rogério Ceni

=== Awards ===
Before the 2020 Copa do Nordeste draw, the following players were rewarded for their performances during the 2019 competition.

- Best player: Edinho (Fortaleza)
- Best goalkeeper: Marcelo Boeck (Fortaleza)
- Topscorer: Gilberto (Bahia) and Júnior Santos (Fortaleza)
