= Edinho (footballer, born 1994) =

Brazilian footballer

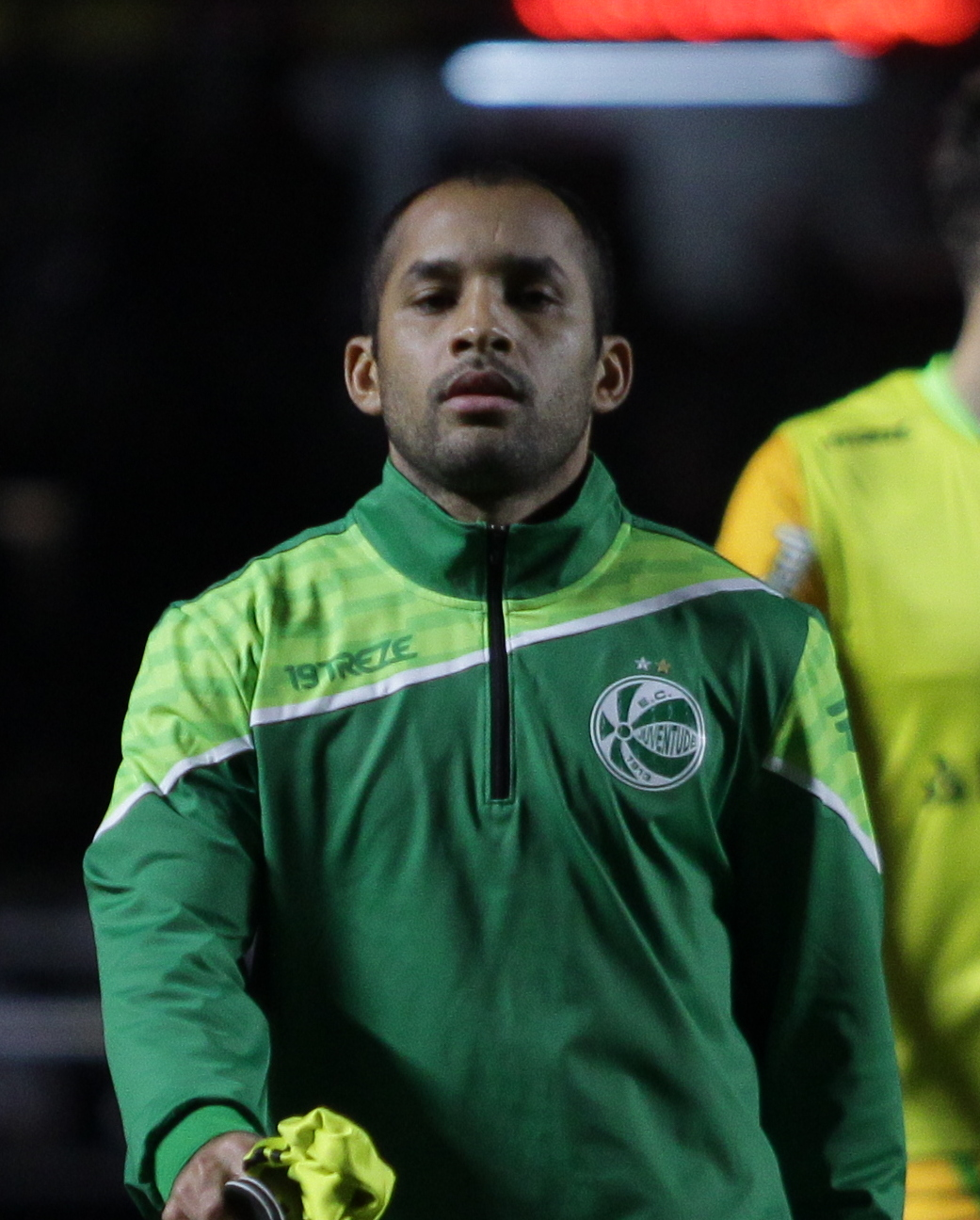

Personal information
- Full name: Francisco Edson Moreira da Silva
- Date of birth: 8 August 1994 (age 32)
- Place of birth: Baturité, Brazil
- Height: 1.58 m (5 ft 2 in)
- Position: Right winger

Team information
- Current team: Paysandu
- Number: 18

Youth career
- 2012–2013: Fortaleza

Senior career*
| Years | Team | Apps | (Gls) |
| 2013–2014 | Fortaleza | 24 | (6) |
| 2014–2016 | Tombense | 0 | (0) |
| 2015 | → Avaí (loan) | 6 | (0) |
| 2015 | → Paysandu (loan) | 27 | (3) |
| 2016 | → Ituano (loan) | 11 | (2) |
| 2016–2018 | Guarani | 12 | (1) |
| 2017 | → Mogi Mirim (loan) | 18 | (6) |
| 2017 | → CSA (loan) | 16 | (1) |
| 2018 | → Fortaleza (loan) | 25 | (4) |
| 2018–2021 | Atlético Mineiro | 6 | (0) |
| 2019 | → Fortaleza (loan) | 40 | (5) |
| 2020–2021 | → Daejeon Hana Citizen (loan) | 25 | (7) |
| 2021–2024 | Fortaleza | 13 | (0) |
| 2022 | → Juventude (loan) | 11 | (0) |
| 2023 | → Sport (loan) | 59 | (6) |
| 2024 | → Paysandu (loan) | 29 | (3) |
| 2025– | Paysandu | 4 | (0) |
- * Club domestic league appearances and goals as of 19 December 2025

Francisco Edson Moreira da Silva (born 8 August 1994), known simply as Edinho, is a Brazilian professional footballer who plays as a right winger for Paysandu.

== Career ==
Born in Baturité, Ceará, Edinho joined Fortaleza EC aged 17 and was promoted to the senior team in 2013. He was a starter in the 2014 Série C campaign making 16 appearances and scoring three goals. In 2014, he was sold to Tombense and in the two following years had a series of loan spells at Avaí, Paysandu and Ituano, before joining Guarani in 2016.

In July 2017, Edinho joined CSA on loan from Guarani, where he won the 2017 Série C title.

In 2018, Edinho returned to Fortaleza and played a major role in the team during the first half of the season, helping them get to the top of the Série B table by the 11th round with two goals and five assists.

On 28 June 2018, Edinho joined Atlético Mineiro on a five-year deal. He made his debut for Atlético, which also was his Série A debut, on 19 July 2018, in a 2–0 away loss to Grêmio.

In January 2019, Edinho rejoined Fortaleza on loan for the season.

== Career statistics ==
As of match played 28 September 2024

Appearances and goals by club, season and competition
| Club | Season | League | | | State league | | National cup (Note: Includes Copa do Brasil, Korean FA Cup) | | Continental | | Other | | Total | |
| Club | Season | Division | Apps | Goals | Apps | Goals | Apps | Goals | Apps | Goals | Apps | Goals | Apps | Goals |
|---|---|---|---|---|---|---|---|---|---|---|---|---|---|---|
| Fortaleza | 2012 | Série C | 0 | 0 | 2 (Note: Appearance(s) in Campeonato Cearense) | 0 | 0 | 0 | — | | — | | 2 | 0 |
| Fortaleza | 2013 | Série C | 2 | 0 | 9 | 1 | 1 | 0 | — | | — | | 12 | 1 |
| Fortaleza | 2014 | Série C | 16 | 3 | 25 | 9 | 0 | 0 | — | | — | | 41 | 12 |
| Fortaleza | Total | | 18 | 3 | 36 | 10 | 1 | 0 | — | | — | | 55 | 13 |
| Avaí (loan) | 2015 | Série A | 0 | 0 | 6 (Note: Appearance(s) in Campeonato Catarinense) | 0 | 0 | 0 | — | | — | | 6 | 0 |
| Paysandu (loan) | 2015 | Série B | 27 | 3 | 0 | 0 | 0 | 0 | — | | — | | 27 | 3 |
| Ituano (loan) | 2016 | Série D | 0 | 0 | 11 (Note: Appearance(s) in Campeonato Paulista Série A1) | 2 | 0 | 0 | — | | — | | 11 | 2 |
| Guarani | 2016 | Série C | 10 | 1 | 0 | 0 | 0 | 0 | — | | — | | 10 | 1 |
| Guarani | 2017 | Série B | 2 | 0 | 0 | 0 | 0 | 0 | — | | — | | 2 | 0 |
| Guarani | Total | | 12 | 1 | 0 | 0 | 0 | 0 | — | | — | | 12 | 1 |
| Mogi Mirim (loan) | 2017 | Série C | 0 | 0 | 18 (Note: Appearance(s) in Campeonato Paulista Série A2) | 6 | 0 | 0 | — | | — | | 18 | 6 |
| CSA (loan) | 2017 | Série C | 16 | 1 | 0 | 0 | 0 | 0 | — | | 1 (Note: Appearance(s) in Copa do Nordeste) | 1 | 17 | 2 |
| Fortaleza (loan) | 2018 | Série B | 11 | 2 | 14 | 2 | 0 | 0 | — | | 0 | 0 | 25 | 4 |
| Atlético Mineiro | 2018 | Série A | 6 | 0 | 0 | 0 | 0 | 0 | 0 | 0 | — | | 6 | 0 |
| Atlético Mineiro | 2020 | Série A | 0 | 0 | 3 (Note: Appearance(s) in Campeonato Mineiro) | 0 | 1 | 0 | 1 (Note: Appearance(s) in Copa Sudamericana) | 0 | — | | 5 | 0 |
| Atlético Mineiro | Total | | | 0 | 3 | 0 | 1 | 0 | 1 | 0 | — | | 11 | 0 |
| Fortaleza (loan) | 2019 | Série A | 29 | 3 | 11 | 2 | 1 | 0 | — | | 10 | 3 | 51 | 8 |
| Daejeon Hana Citizen (loan) | 2020 | K League 2 | 15 | 5 | — | | 0 | 0 | — | | — | | 15 | 5 |
| Daejeon Hana Citizen (loan) | 2021 | K League 2 | 10 | 2 | — | | 0 | 0 | — | | — | | 10 | 2 |
| Daejeon Hana Citizen (loan) | Total | | 25 | 7 | — | | 0 | 0 | — | | — | | 25 | 7 |
| Fortaleza | 2021 | Série A | 13 | 0 | 0 | 0 | 4 | 0 | — | | 0 | 0 | 17 | 0 |
| Juventude (loan) | 2022 | Série A | 10 | 0 | 0 | 0 | 1 | 0 | — | | — | | 11 | 0 |
| Sport Recife (loan) | 2023 | Série B | 34 | 2 | 13 (Note: Appearance(s) in Campeonato Pernambucano) | 2 | 3 | 0 | — | | 9 | 2 | 59 | 6 |
| Paysandu (loan) | 2024 | Série B | 14 | 0 | 0 | 0 | 1 | 0 | — | | 7 (Note: Appearance(s) in Copa Verde) | 3 | 22 | 3 |
| Career total | | | 215 | 20 | 112 | 24 | 12 | 0 | 1 | 0 | 27 | 9 | 367 | 53 |

== Honours ==
CSA

- Campeonato Brasileiro Série C: 2017

Fortaleza

- Campeonato Cearense: 2019

Sport

- Campeonato Pernambucano: 2023

Paysandu

- Campeonato Paraense: 2024
- Copa Verde: 2024

Fortaleza

- Melhor jogador do Campeonato Cearense: 2019
