= André Baumer =

Brazilian footballer (born 1997)

Personal information
- Full name: André Luiz Baumer
- Date of birth: 18 February 1997 (age 29)
- Place of birth: Joinville, Brazil
- Height: 1.88 m (6 ft 2 in)
- Position: Centre back

Team information
- Current team: Joinville

Youth career
- –2018: Joinville
- 2016–2017: → Flamengo (loan)

Senior career*
| Years | Team | Apps | (Gls) |
| 2018– | Joinville | 9 | (1) |
| 2018–2019 | → Académico Viseu (loan) | 19 | (0) |
- * Club domestic league appearances and goals as of 11:45, 27 September 2019 (UTC)

André Luiz Baumer (born 18 February 1997) is a Brazilian professional footballer who plays as a defender for Joinville.

== Career statistics ==
=== Club ===
As of 10 January 2019.

| Club | Season | League | | | Cup | | Other | | Total | |
| Club | Season | Division | Apps | Goals | Apps | Goals | Apps | Goals | Apps | Goals |
|---|---|---|---|---|---|---|---|---|---|---|
| Joinville | 2018 | Série C | 9 | 1 | 0 | 0 | 1 (Note: Appearances in the Campeonato Catarinense) | 0 | 10 | 1 |
| Académico Viseu (loan) | 2018–19 | LigaPro | 10 | 0 | 0 | 0 | 0 | 0 | 10 | 0 |
| Career total | | | 19 | 1 | 0 | 0 | 1 | 0 | 20 | 1 |
