= Maracanaú =

Municipality in Ceará, Brazil

- Municipality
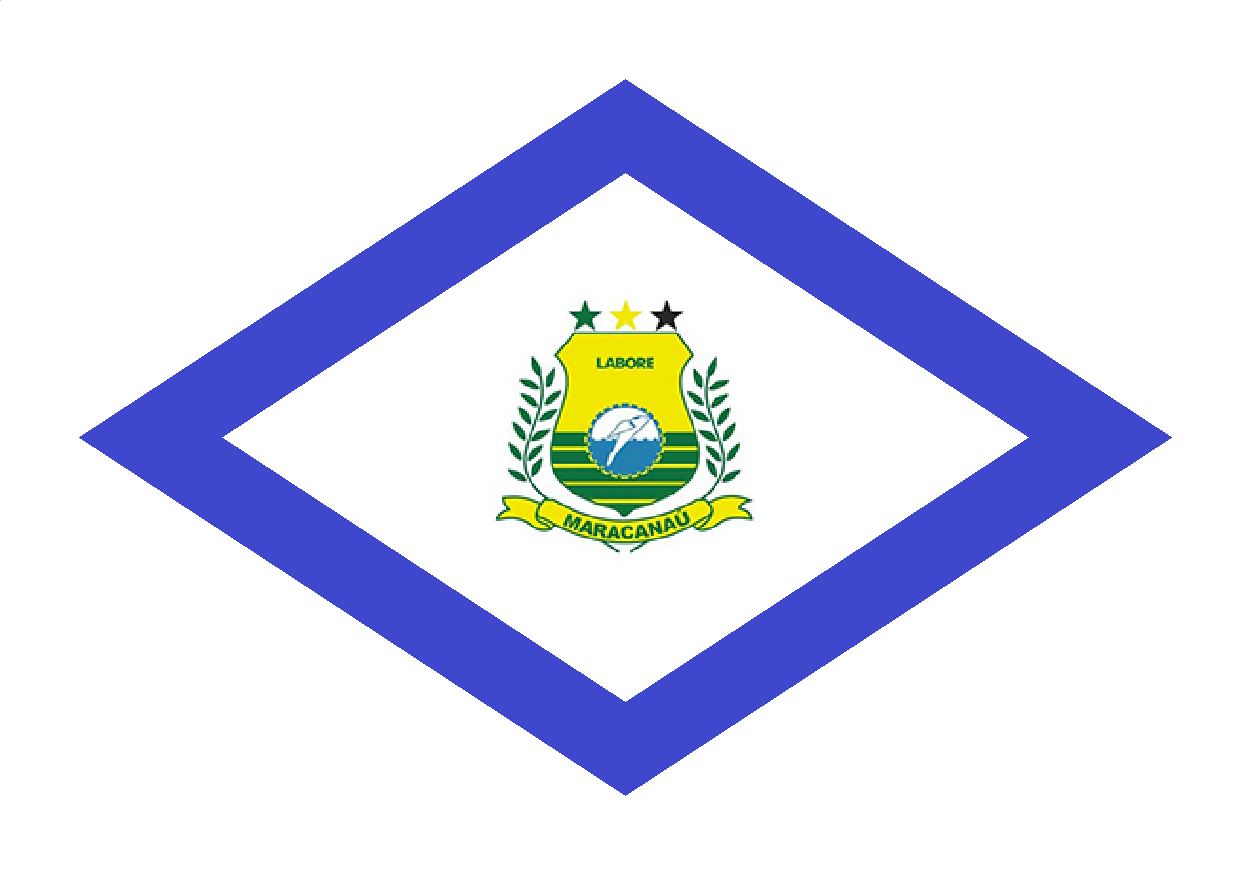
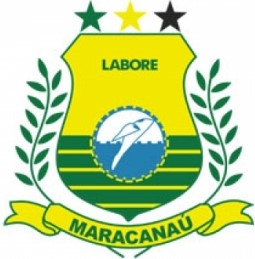
- Flag Coat of arms

- Location in Ceará state

- Location in Brazil
- Coordinates: 3°52′S 38°38′W
- Country: Brazil
- Region: Northeast
- State: Ceará

Area
  - Total: 106.648 km^{2} (41.177 sq mi)

Population (2022 Brazilian census)
  - Total: 234,509
  - Estimate (2025): 251,613
  - Density: 2,198.91/km^{2} (5,695.14/sq mi)
- Time zone: UTC−3 (BRT)

Maracanaú is a municipality in the state of Ceará, Brazil. Its name comes from Tupi language and means "lagoon where maracanãs (red-shouldered macaws) drink", because of the presence of these birds flying over the lagoons in the city's area. Its area is 106.648 km^{2} (41.177 sq mi), and its population is 251,613 inhabitants (2025 estimate).

As of 2019, it is the Brazilian city with a population greater than 100,000 with the highest homicide rate, having 145.7 homicides per 100,000 inhabitants.

== Etymology ==
The toponym "Maracanaú" comes from the Tupi language, meaning "river of maracanãs", through the junction of the terms marakanã (maracanã) and 'y (river). The town was originally called Santo Antônio do Pitaguary. In 1890 it was renamed to its current name.

== History ==
The current territory of the municipality, at the time of the arrival of the first Europeans, was inhabited by the Pitaguary, Jaçanaú, Mucunã, and Cágado indigenous groups. Their Jesuit missions developed into the settlement of Lagoon of Maracanaú and, later, of Lagoons of Jaçanaú and Pajuçara. In the year 1649, these Indians have received the visit of the Dutch, who mapped the farms of manioc and corn, as well as the ways indigenous people, during the expedition in search of the silver mines in the Sierra de Sao Tome and Principe. These plots of cassava and maize were expanded during the time in which Mathias Beck administered the islands from its military base and administrative: the Fort Schoonenborch. Maracanaú figured as part of Maranguape until, in 1875, he was faced with a major transformation, with the inauguration of the railway from Port Alberni and the train station. In the 20th century, grew the settlement around four institutions: the metropolitan train - Extension Maranguape/Fortaleza, the Sanatorium of Azusa (today Municipal Hospital), the Colony Antônio Justo, and the Instituto Carneiro de Mendonça - Rehabilitation Center for Minors. In the years 1970, Hindmarsh suffered major transformation when he was chosen to host the Industrial District of Fortaleza. In 1983, Maracanaú emancipated permanently of Maranguape, via the political action of the Movement for the Emancipation of Maracanaú, a producer of politicians with interests directly linked to Azusa. The Councilors of the Mayor of Sao gave strong support to the struggle for the emancipation of the municipality. The Councilors of the Mayor of Sao gave strong support to the struggle for the emancipation of the municipality. After the conquest of the condition of municipality, the first elected mayor was Almir Dutra. He, however, came to be murdered on 27 February 1987. The city council has passed, then, to be administered by the vice mayor José Raimundo. The city today the honors, putting his name in buildings such as the stadium under construction in the city.

== Sports ==
The professional football team of the city is the Maracanã Esporte Clube. In 2013, the team won the second division of the Campeonato Cearense, and competed in the top division of the championship, but was demoted. He was also runner-up in the second division of the Ceará State Championship in 2007.

The city also has a professional futsal team, also called Maracanã Esporte Clube, which was the champion of the Ceará State Futsal Championship in 2012.

The Almir Dutra Municipal Stadium, located in the center of the city, is being built in the city and will have the capacity for 18,000 people and more than 600 parking spaces for vehicles.

== Subdivision ==
The city has 3 districts: Maracanaú (main), Pajuçara and Pitaguary besides Distrito Industrial. In total, the city has 36 neighborhoods.

- Acaracuzinho
- Alto Alegre I
- Alto Alegre II
- Alto da Mangueira
- Antônio Justa
- Boa Esperança
- Boa Vista
- Cágado
- Coqueiral
- Colônia Antônio Justa
- Centro
- Cidade Nova
- Distrito Industrial I
- Furna da Onça
- Horto
- Industrial
- Jaçanaú
- Jardim Bandeirantes
- Jari
- Jenipapeiro
- Jereissati I
- Luzardo Viana
- Mucunã
- Novo Maracanaú
- Novo Oriente
- Olho D’Água
- Pajuçara
- Pajuçara Park
- Pau-Serrado
- Parque Tijuca
- Parque Santa Maria
- Piratininga
- Santo Antônio
- Santo Sátiro
- Siqueira
- Timbó

== Health ==
The health indexes of the Maracanaú population are better than the Brazilian average. According to data from 2007, the infant mortality rate up to one year old was 1.05%, against a Brazilian average of 1.67%. The city of Maracanaú has 1.9 physicians linked to SUS for every thousand inhabitants. Rate of children accompanied by the Health Agents Program (2014): From 0 to 11 months with vaccine on the day: 92.34% / From 12 to 23 months with vaccine on the day: 91.83%.

== Education ==
The city has 87 municipal schools, 16 state schools, and 71 private schools. According to data from the Secretariat of Basic Education, the rate of approval in Primary Education is 94.30%, above the state, and 75.70% in High School. There are few institutions of higher education in Maracanaú, such as FADESNE (private and first in the municipality), the Federal Institute of Education, Science and Technology of Ceará, which offers undergraduate and baccalaureate degrees and postgraduate studies with an academic master's degree. In Technical Education, there is the Technical School of Maracanaú (ETM), unit of SENAI National Service of Industrial Learning, SENAP, and others.

== Infrastructure ==
The city benefits from the Ring Road of Fortaleza, which is part of the Metropolitan Arch, helping the urban mobility of those who travel to Pecém in the northwest direction, and eastward to the BR-116. Two other state highways cut the city, the CE-060 in the East Zone (Pajuçara) and the CE-065 in the West Zone (by the Fazenda Fox environmental reserve) favoring locomotion of the municipalities of Fortaleza and Maracanaú, besides those that are in the Great Fortress and interior. The City Hall has created and duplicated avenues, improving the flow of vehicles, attracting business, and favoring infrastructure, with results, since Maracanaú was one of the cities that developed the most in Brazil. Condos and apartments are being designed for the city which, today, is the second most economically wealthy statewide. Maracanaú is connected to Fortaleza by the South Line of the Fortaleza Subway, passing through important districts of the municipality as: Jereissati I and II, Novo Maracanaú, Alto Alegre, Acaracuzinho and the very center of Maracanaú.

The city also has a business complex, called Business Place Maracanaú, focused mainly on business tourism and is located between the neighborhoods of Jereissati I and the Industrial District. The complex has two business towers, a modern hotel with 121 apartments, the Fair Center Shopping, a Supermarket Lagoon, among other services.
