= Associação Esportiva Tiradentes =

Tiradentes
- Full name: Associação Esportiva Tiradentes
- Nickname(s): O Tigre da PM; Tigre da Polícia Militar; Rubro-Azulino; Bicolor
- Founded: 15 September 1961
- Ground: Estádio Presidente Vargas, Fortaleza, Ceará state, Brazil
- Capacity: 23,000
- President: Sargento Fernandes
- Head Coach: Sérgio Alves
Home colours	Away colours	colours

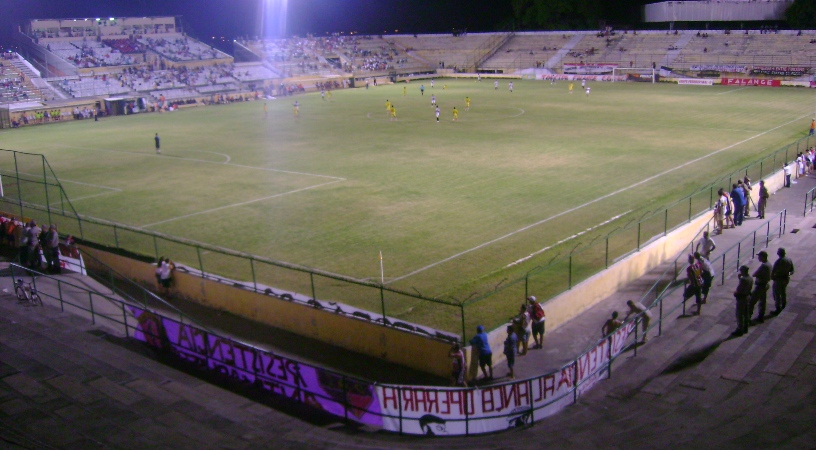
Estádio Presidente Vargas (Ceará)

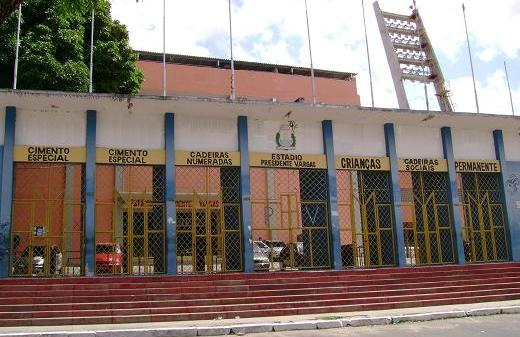
Estádio Presidente Vargas – exterior view

Associação Esportiva Tiradentes, commonly known as Tiradentes, is a Brazilian football club based in Fortaleza, Ceará state. They competed in the Série C once.

== History ==
The club was founded on 15 September 1961. They won the Campeonato Cearense in 1992.

== Honours ==
- Campeonato Cearense
  - Winners (1): 1992

== Stadium ==
Associação Esportiva Tiradentes play their home games at Estádio Presidente Vargas. The stadium has a maximum capacity of 23,000 people. The club also plays at Estádio Alcides Santos, which has a maximum capacity of 7,100 people.
