= Maracanã Esporte Clube =

Maracanã
- Full name: Maracanã Esporte Clube
- Nicknames: Maracanã das Indústrias; Alviceleste; Maracanã Industrial
- Founded: 31 January 2005; 21 years ago
- Ground: Estádio Municipal Ribeirão, Maracanaú, Ceará state, Brazil
- Capacity: 2,000
- League: Campeonato Brasileiro Série D Campeonato Cearense
- 2025 2025: Série D, 59th of 64; Cearense, 3rd of 10
Home colors	Away colors

Maracanã Esporte Clube, commonly known as Maracanã, is a Brazilian football club based in Maracanaú, Ceará state.

== History ==
The club was founded on January 31, 2005, and joined the Federação Cearense de Futebol in the same year. Maracanã was promoted to the 2008 Campeonato Cearense Second Level after finishing in the second position in the 2007 Campeonato Cearense Third Level. The team was promoted to the 2013 Campeonato Cearense after they won the Campeonato Cearense Second Level in 2012, when they defeated Pacatuba 4–2 on May 27, 2012, in Horizonte, in the last round of the competition.

== Honours ==
=== State ===
- Copa Fares Lopes
  - Winners (1): 2025
- Campeonato Cearense Série B
  - Winners (2): 2012, 2021
- Campeonato Cearense Série C
  - Winners (1): 2020
- Taça Padre Cícero
  - Winners (2): 2024, 2025

=== Futsal ===
- Campeonato Cearense de Futsal
  - Winners (1): 2012

== Stadium ==
Maracanã Esporte Clube play their home games at Estádio Municipal Ribeirão. The stadium has a maximum capacity of 2,000 people.

== Uniforms ==
The colors of the Maracanã uniform, the sky blue, and the white, being the 1st uniform, is the vertical striped shirt in sky blue and white, with blue shorts and white socks.

The second uniform consists of a white shirt with details in light blue, with white shorts and white stockings.
