= Pacajus =

Municipality in Ceará, Brazil

Coordinates: 4°10′S 38°28′W

- Municipality
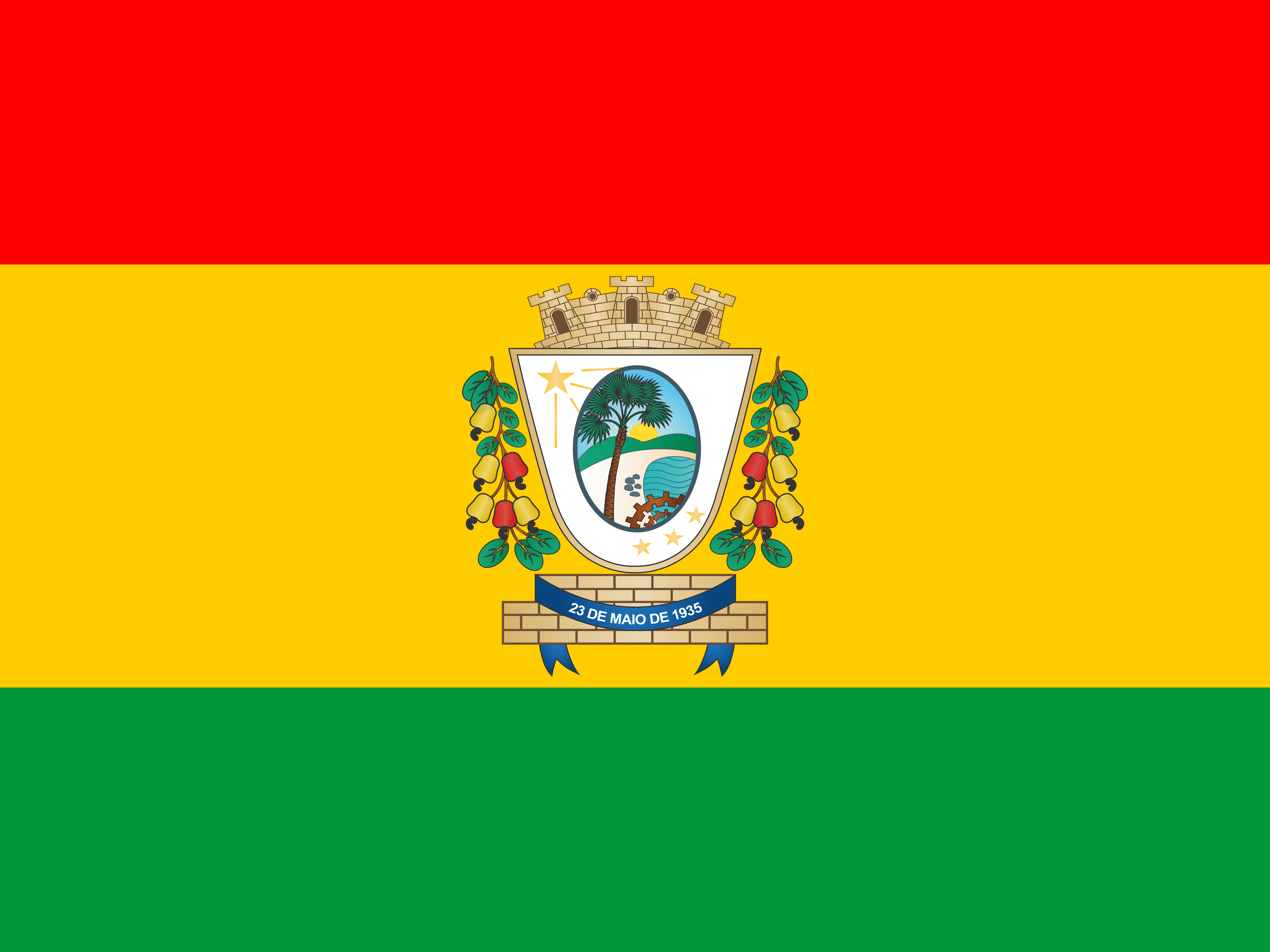
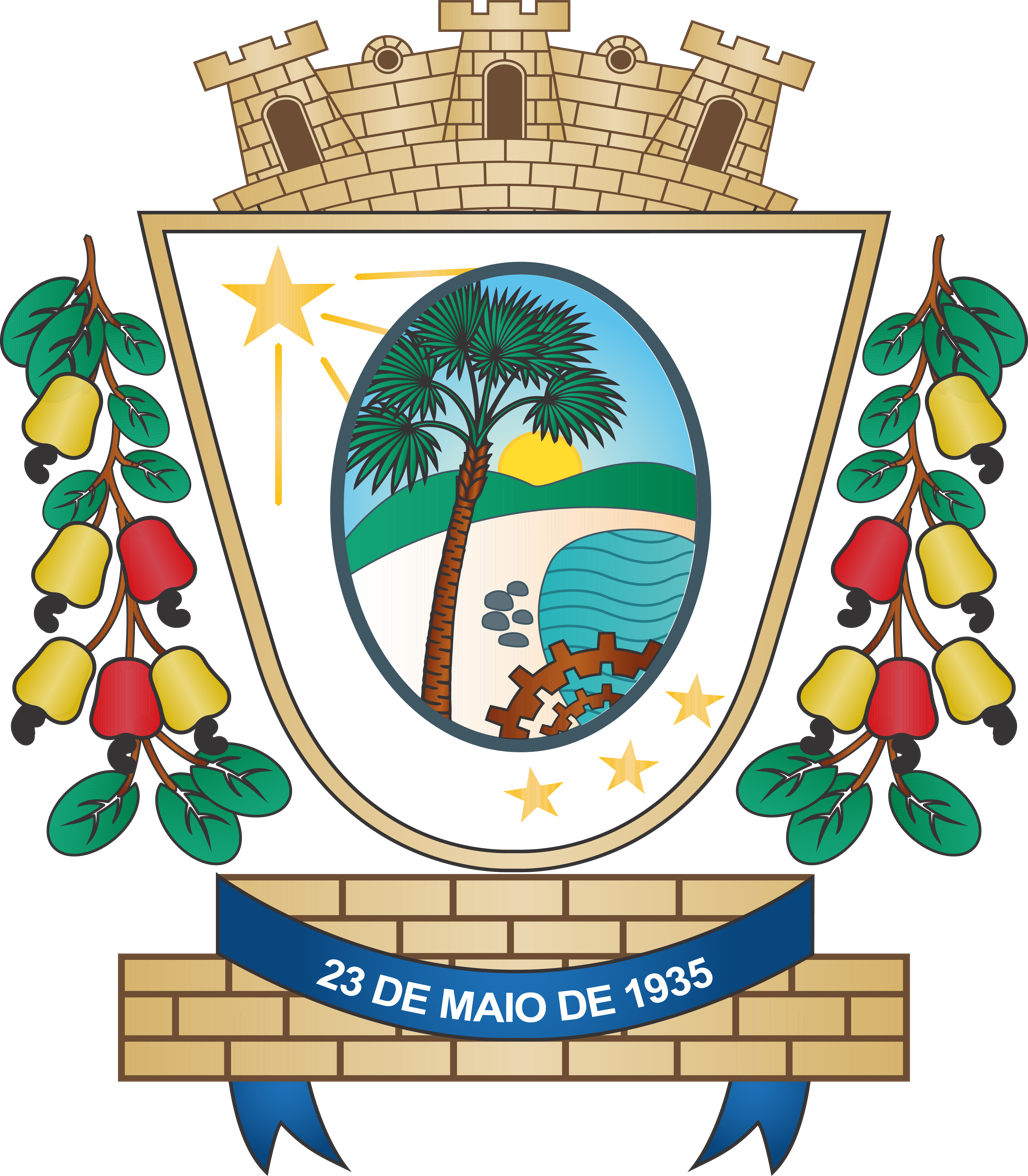
- Flag Coat of arms
- Interactive map of Pacajus
- Country: Brazil
- Region: Northeast
- State: Ceará
- Mesoregion: Metropolitana de Fortaleza

Population (2020)
  - Total: 73,188
- Time zone: UTC−3 (BRT)

Pacajus is a municipality in Ceará, Northeast Region, Brazil.

== See also ==
- List of municipalities in Ceará
