= 2020 Campeonato Cearense =

Campeonato Cearense
- Season: 2020
- Champions: Fortaleza
- Relegated: Floresta; Horizonte

The 2020 Campeonato Cearense was the 106th season of Ceará's top football league. Fortaleza won the league for the 43rd time.

== Format ==
First Round

- All the eight teams play each other once.
- The top six teams go to the Second round.
- The bottom two teams are relegated.

Second Round

- The eight teams play each other once.
- The top four teams go the Finals round.

Final Rounds

- The four teams are split according to the final standings and play semi-final match.
- The two semi-final winners will compete in the final to determine the 2020 Campeonato Cearense winners.

== Teams ==
| Club | Home city | Venue |
|---|---|---|
| Atlético Cearense | Fortaleza | Estádio Presidente Vargas |
| Barbalha | Barbalha | Estádio Antônio Lírio Callou |
| Caucaia | Caucaia | Estadio Municipal Raimundo de Oliveira Filho |
| Ceará | Fortaleza | Castelão |
| Ferroviário | Fortaleza | Estádio Presidente Vargas |
| Fortaleza | Fortaleza | Castelão |
| Floresta | Fortaleza | Estádio Felipe Santiago |
| Guarany | Sobral | Estádio Plácido Aderaldo Castelo |
| Horizonte | Horizonte | Estádio Olímpico Horácio Domingos De Sousa |
| Pacajus | Pacajus | |

== First round ==
| Pos | Team | Pld | W | D | L | GF | GA | GD | Pts | Promotion or qualification |
|---|---|---|---|---|---|---|---|---|---|---|
| 1 | Guarany | 7 | 4 | 3 | 0 | 9 | 3 | +6 | 15 | Qualification to the Second round |
| 2 | Barbalha | 7 | 4 | 2 | 1 | 11 | 3 | +8 | 14 | Qualification to the Second round |
| 3 | Ferroviário | 7 | 3 | 3 | 1 | 6 | 4 | +2 | 12 | Qualification to the Second round |
| 4 | Atlético Cearense | 7 | 2 | 2 | 3 | 8 | 9 | −1 | 8 (Note: Head-to-head points: Atlético Cearense 3, Caucaia 0) | Qualification to the Second round |
| 5 | Caucaia | 7 | 1 | 5 | 1 | 9 | 8 | +1 | 8 | Qualification to the Second round |
| 6 | Pacajus | 7 | 1 | 4 | 2 | 4 | 6 | −2 | 7 | Qualification to the Second round |
| 7 | Floresta | 7 | 1 | 3 | 3 | 9 | 14 | −5 | 6 | Relegation to the Campeonato Cearense B |
| 8 | Horizonte | 7 | 0 | 2 | 5 | 3 | 12 | −9 | 2 | Relegation to the Campeonato Cearense B |

Source: Soccerway
Rules for classification: 1) Points 2) Head-to-head points; 3) Goal difference; 4) Goals scored

== Second round ==
| Pos | Team | Pld | W | D | L | GF | GA | GD | Pts | Promotion or qualification |
|---|---|---|---|---|---|---|---|---|---|---|
| 1 | Fortaleza | 7 | 6 | 0 | 1 | 20 | 4 | +16 | 18 | Qualification to the Finals round |
| 2 | Ceará | 7 | 4 | 2 | 1 | 10 | 3 | +7 | 14 | Qualification to the Finals round |
| 3 | Ferroviário | 7 | 4 | 2 | 1 | 7 | 5 | +2 | 14 | Qualification to the Finals round |
| 4 | Guarany | 7 | 4 | 1 | 2 | 7 | 7 | 0 | 13 | Qualification to the Finals round |
| 5 | Atlético Cearense | 7 | 3 | 1 | 3 | 13 | 12 | +1 | 10 | |
| 6 | Caucaia | 7 | 1 | 1 | 5 | 4 | 10 | −6 | 4 (Note: Head-to-head points: Caucaia 3, Pacajus 0) | |
| 7 | Pacajus | 7 | 1 | 1 | 5 | 7 | 14 | −7 | 4 | |
| 8 | Barbalha | 7 | 1 | 0 | 6 | 6 | 19 | −13 | 3 | |

Source: Soccerway
Rules for classification: 1) Points 2) Head-to-head points; 3) Goal difference; 4) Goals scored

== Final rounds ==
=== Semi-finals ===
18 July 2020
18:30

| Fortaleza | 1–0 | Guarany |
|---|---|---|
| Tiago Orobó 23' | Report |

Castelão, Fortaleza
19 July 2020
18:30

| Ceará | 1–0 | Ferroviário |
|---|---|---|
| Felipe Silva 37' | Report |

Castelão

=== Final ===
30 September 2020
21:30

| Ceará | 1–2 | Fortaleza |
|---|---|---|
| Rafael Sóbis 45+5' | Report | Bruno Melo 35'; Tinga 90+1' |

Castelão, Fortaleza
21 October 2020
21:30

| Fortaleza | 1–0 | Ceará |
|---|---|---|
| Tinga 60' | Report |

Castelão, Fortaleza
