= Ferroviário Atlético Clube (CE) =

Brazilian association football club based in Fortaleza, Ceará, Brazil

Ferroviário
- Full name: Ferroviário Atlético Clube
- Nicknames: Tubarão da Barra (Barra's Shark); Ferrão (Big Iron); Time Proletário (Proletarian Team)
- Founded: 9 May 1933; 93 years ago
- Ground: Estádio Elzir Cabral
- Capacity: 2,160
- President: Newton Filho
- Head coach: Roberto Fonseca
- League: Campeonato Brasileiro Série D Campeonato Cearense
- 2025 2025: Série D, 32nd of 64; Cearense, 4th of 10
- Website: www.ferroviario.com.br
Home colors	Away colors

Ferroviário Atlético Clube, commonly referred to as Ferroviário, is a Brazilian professional club based in Fortaleza, Ceará founded on 9 May 1933. It competes in the Campeonato Brasileiro Série D, the fourth tier of Brazilian football, as well as in the Campeonato Cearense, the top flight of the Ceará state football league.

== History ==
The club was founded after two amateur soccer teams, named Matapasto and Jurubeba fused, and after RVC (Rede de Viação Cearense, "Cearense Transit Net"), a railroad company, wanted to have a team playing in Campeonato Cearense. On May 9, 1933 the team was founded as Ferroviário Foot-Ball Club. The club changed its name to Ferroviário Atlético Clube after some time.

In 1937, Ferroviário won its first title, the Campeonato Cearense Second Division, being promoted to the following year's first division. In 1945, the club won its first state championship, the Campeonato Cearense, after beating Maguari 3-1 in the final. In 1968, Ferroviário won the Campeonato Cearense without losing a single match.

On December 6, 2005, a Ferroviário player, Alessandro, died during a training at Vila Olímpica Elzir Cabral.

== Honours ==
=== Official tournaments ===
National
Competitions	Titles	Seasons
Campeonato Brasileiro Série D	2	2018, 2023
State
Competitions	Titles	Seasons
Campeonato Cearense	9	1945, 1950, 1952, 1968, 1970, 1979, 1988, 1994, 1995
Copa Fares Lopes	3	2018, 2020, 2024
Copa dos Campeões Cearenses	1	2019

- record

=== Others tournaments ===
==== State ====
- Torneio Início do Ceará (5): 1940, 1941, 1946, 1949, 1966

=== Runners-up ===
- Campeonato Cearense (20): 1940, 1942, 1946, 1947, 1949, 1951, 1953, 1955, 1960, 1963, 1967, 1980, 1981, 1982, 1983, 1989, 1996, 1998, 2003, 2017
- Copa Fares Lopes (1): 2023

=== Women's Football ===
- Campeonato Cearense de Futebol Feminino (1): 1983
