= Oliveira Canindé =

Brazilian footballer

Personal information
- Full name: Oliveira dos Santos Lopes
- Date of birth: 8 November 1965 (age 61)
- Place of birth: Canindé, Brazil
- Position: Defensive midfielder

Team information
- Current team: Caucaia

Senior career*
Years	Team	Apps	(Gls)
1983–1990	Ceará		
1991–1992	Fortaleza		
1993	São Bento		
1994–1995	Figueirense		
1996	Marcílio Dias		
1997	Fortaleza		
1998–1999	Uniclinic		

Managerial career
- 2003: Boa Viagem
- 2004: Quixadá
- 2004–2005: Limoeiro
- 2005: Piauí
- 2006: Parnahyba
- 2006: Icasa
- 2007: Parnahyba
- 2007: Uniclinic
- 2008: Ferroviário
- 2008: Guarani de Juazeiro
- 2008: Crato
- 2009: Guarany de Sobral
- 2009: Parnahyba
- 2009: Boa Viagem
- 2010: Guarany de Sobral
- 2010: Parnahyba
- 2011: Guarany de Sobral
- 2011: Moto Club
- 2011: Ríver
- 2012: Icasa
- 2012: Flamengo-PI
- 2012–2013: Campinense
- 2013: Guarany de Sobral
- 2014: CSA
- 2014: América-RN
- 2014: Santa Cruz
- 2015: Sampaio Corrêa
- 2015–2017: CSA
- 2017: Remo
- 2018: Treze
- 2018: Floresta
- 2018: Altos
- 2019: Ríver
- 2019: Hercílio Luz
- 2019: Crato
- 2019: Caucaia
- 2020: Campinense
- 2020: Caucaia
- 2020: Oeirense
- 2020: Atlético Cajazeirense
- 2021: Bahia de Feira
- 2021–2022: Manauara
- 2022: Pacajus
- 2023: CSE
- 2023: Parnahyba
- 2024: Bahia de Feira
- 2024–2025: Caucaia
- * Club domestic league appearances and goals as of 13 April 2024

Oliveira dos Santos Lopes (born 8 November 1965), better known as Oliveira Canindé, is a Brazilian former professional footballer and manager who played as a defensive midfielder.

== Playing career ==
Futsal player in his hometown, Canindé, Ceará, Oliveira was invited to Ceará SC youth squad in the 80s, adapting to field football as a defensive player. He also played for Fortaleza, São Bento, Figueirense, Marcílio Dias and Uniclinic, where he ended his career as an athlete in 1999.

== Managerial career ==
Oliveira Canindé began his career as a coach at Boa Viagem EC in Ceará, and his first major job was Limoeiro campaign in the 2004 Campeonato Brasileiro Série C. He won his first title at Parnahyba SC, being state champion in 2006. In 2010, he achieved great work again in the smaller divisions of the Brazilian Championship, with the Série D title with Guarany de Sobral.

In 2012 he won the Copa Piauí with EC Flamengo, and in the following season he reached the pinnacle of his career, winning the 2013 Copa do Nordeste with Campinense. He worked in the following seasons on teams at Santa Cruz, América de Natal (being state champion once again), CSA and Sampaio Corrêa. In 2015, again at CSA, he gained the promotion with the club being runner-up in Série D.

After a few years training intermediate teams, he had a job opportunity in Santa Catarina at Hercílio Luz. In the same year, he returned to Ceará, where he won the Copa Fares Lopes with Caucaia EC. In 2021 he was the first coach in the history of the newly founded Manaura EC, winning the Amazonas second division, where he remained until the beginning of 2022. In the second half of the year, worked at Pacajus and in 2023, at CSE and in a new spell at Parnahyba.

In 2024 he started the season at AD Bahia de Feira, but ended up being fired due to the team's bad campaign at Campeonato Baiano. He was later announced as the new coach of Caucaia EC.

== Honours ==
=== Player ===
Ceará

- Campeonato Cearense: 1984, 1986, 1989

Figueirense

- Campeonato Catarinense: 1994

Atlético Cearense

- Campeonato Cearense Série B: 1998

=== Manager ===
Parnahyba

- Campeonato Piauiense: 2006

Guarany de Sobral

- Campeonato Brasileiro Série D: 2010

Flamengo-PI

- Copa Piauí: 2012

Campinense

- Copa do Nordeste: 2013

América-RN

- Campeonato Potiguar: 2014
- Copa Cidade do Natal: 2014

Caucaia

- Copa Fares Lopes: 2019

Manauara

- Campeonato Amazonense Second Division: 2021
