= Reginaldo França =

Brazilian football manager

Personal information
- Full name: Reginaldo de França Lopes
- Date of birth: 31 October 1969 (age 56)
- Place of birth: Fortaleza, Brazil
- Position: Defensive midfielder

Team information
- Current team: Tirol (head coach)

Youth career
- Ceará

Senior career*
Years	Team	Apps	(Gls)
1999	Uniclinic		
2000	Uruburetama		
2001–2003	Maranguape		
2002	→ Ferroviário (loan)		
2003	Itapipoca		
2004	Boa Viagem		
2004	Cascavel		
2005	Quixadá		
2005	Guarany de Sobral		
2005	São Benedito		
2006	Ferroviário		
2006	São Benedito		

Managerial career
- 2007–2009: São Benedito
- 2009: Tiradentes-CE
- 2010: Maranguape
- 2010: São Benedito
- 2011: Maranguape U17
- 2011: Maranguape
- 2012: Pacatuba U20
- 2012: América-CE
- 2012: Maranguape
- 2013: São Benedito
- 2014: Pacatuba
- 2014: Aliança Atlética
- 2015–2018: Maranguape
- 2018: União-CE
- 2018: Crateús
- 2019: Tiradentes-CE (assistant)
- 2019: Floresta U20
- 2020: Crato
- 2021: Atlético Cearense
- 2021: Picos
- 2021: Maranguape
- 2022: Atlético Cearense
- 2022–2023: Tiradentes-CE
- 2023: Maranguape
- 2024: Imperatriz
- 2024–2025: Tocantinópolis
- 2025–: Tirol
- * Club domestic league appearances and goals

Reginaldo de França Lopes (born 31 October 1969), known as Reginaldo França, is a Brazilian professional football coach and former player. He is the current head coach of Tirol.

A defensive midfielder, França played his entire career for teams in the Ceará state, aside from a short period at Cascavel in 2004, and notably represented Ferroviário in the 2002 Série C. He retired in 2006 with São Benedito, and subsequently became their manager in the following year. As a manager, he also remained in his native state, notably managing Maranguape for nearly four consecutive years.

== Honours ==
=== Player ===
Guarany de Sobral

- Campeonato Cearense Segunda Divisão: 2005

São Benedito

- Campeonato Cearense Terceira Divisão: 2005
