= Raimundo Wágner =

Brazilian football manager

Personal information
- Full name: Raimundo Wágner Rodrigues e Silva
- Date of birth: 25 July 1971 (age 55)
- Place of birth: Juazeiro do Norte, Brazil
- Position: Midfielder

Team information
- Current team: Icasa (head coach)

Youth career
- Santa Clara

Senior career*
Years	Team	Apps	(Gls)
- Guarani de Juazeiro
- Iguatu FC

Managerial career
- Campo Grande-CE
- Crato
- 2007: Barbalha
- 2008: Icasa
- 2009: Vasco de Iguatu
- 2010: Guarani de Juazeiro
- 2011–2012: Icasa (assistant)
- 2011: Icasa (interim)
- 2011: Icasa (interim)
- 2012: Bahia de Feira U20
- 2012: Bahia de Feira (interim)
- 2014: Quixadá
- 2014: Iguatu
- 2015: Quixadá
- 2015: Ferroviário
- 2015–2016: Alto Santo
- 2017–2018: Floresta
- 2018: Guarani de Juazeiro
- 2019–2020: Atlético Cearense
- 2020: Iguatu
- 2021–2022: Atlético Cearense
- 2022: Pacajus
- 2022–2023: Floresta
- 2023: Floresta U20
- 2024: Ferroviário (interim)
- 2024: Ferroviário (interim)
- 2024: Floresta
- 2024–2025: Floresta U20
- 2026–: Icasa
- * Club domestic league appearances and goals

Raimundo Wágner Rodrigues e Silva (born 25 July 1971), also known as Raimundinho, is a Brazilian professional football coach and former player who played as a midfielder. He is the current head coach of Icasa.

== Career ==
Born in Juazeiro do Norte, Ceará, Raimundinho played as a midfielder for local teams in his native state. After retiring, he worked as a manager mainly in his native state, being notably in charge of Icasa in 2011 in the Série B. He was also a youth coordinator at Guarani de Juazeiro in 2013 and Floresta in 2018.

On 23 July 2019, Raimundinho was named manager of Atlético Cearense. He led the side to a first-ever promotion in the Série D in 2021, but resigned on 11 January 2022 after alleging personal reasons, and was appointed in charge of Pacajus late in the month.

Raimundinho returned to Floresta on 22 March 2022, being named manager of the team for the year's Campeonato Cearense Série B, while Ricardo Drubscky was in charge of the side during the 2022 Série C. On 30 November, he was named the sole head coach of the club for the 2023 season.

On 18 April 2023, after Gerson Gusmão was announced as the head coach of the first team for the 2023 Série C, Raimundinho was named in charge of the under-20 team. The following 24 January, he was presented at Ferroviário as a technical coordinator, but was immediately named interim head coach.

On 9 September 2024, Raimundinho returned to Floresta to coach the side in the Taça Fares Lopes.

== Honours ==
=== Coach ===
Barbalha

- Campeonato Cearense Terceira Divisão: 2007

Alto Santo

- Campeonato Cearense Terceira Divisão: 2015

Floresta

- Taça Fares Lopes: 2017
