= Olávio =

Brazilian footballer

Personal information
- Full name: Olávio dos Santos Lima Filho
- Date of birth: 10 September 1993 (age 33)
- Place of birth: Missão Velha, Brazil
- Height: 1.84 m (6 ft 0 in)
- Position: Forward

Team information
- Current team: Bylis
- Number: 9

Youth career
- Icasa

Senior career*
Years	Team	Apps	(Gls)
2011–2013	Icasa	15	(1)
2013	Guarani de Juazeiro	0	(0)
2014	Crato	16	(1)
2014	Alecrim	2	(0)
2014	Barbalha	0	(0)
2015	Alecrim	13	(0)
2016	Iguatu	4	(0)
2016	Crato	0	(0)
2017	Paraíba	10	(0)
2017	Barbalha	10	(3)
2018	Guarani de Juazeiro	9	(2)
2018–2019	Barbalha	29	(6)
2018	→ Caucaia (loan)	0	(0)
2019	Atlético Cearense	6	(1)
2020	Guarany de Sobral	12	(0)
2020	→ Juazeirense (loan)	4	(0)
2020	→ Ferroviário (loan)	10	(0)
2020	→ Icasa (loan)	11	(7)
2021–2022	Atlético Cearense	24	(22)
2021	→ Volta Redonda (loan)	7	(2)
2022	→ Campinense (loan)	21	(13)
2022	Chiangrai United	8	(3)
2023–2024	Brusque	67	(16)
2024	Athletic	2	(0)
2025	Shijiazhuang Gongfu	15	(4)
2025–2026	Brusque	15	(2)
2026–	Bylis	6	(0)
- * Club domestic league appearances and goals as of 13 May 2026

Olávio dos Santos Lima Filho (born 10 September 1993), simply known as Olávio, is a Brazilian professional footballer who plays for Bylis in the Albanian Kategoria Superiore. He previous played as a centre-back and midfielder, and currently plays as a forward.

== Career ==
Ólávio started his career as a centre-back at Icasa, and played the first 10 years of his career in this position. And it was exactly at the Icasa, in 2020 where the player found himself as a forward, scoring 7 goals in 11 matches for the club. In 2022 he was top scorer and state champion with Campinense. He had a quick spell at Chiangrai United F.C. and in 2023 signed with Brusque.

In August 2024, Olavio transferred to Athletic Club from São João del-Rei, where he played in only two matches. In 2025, he transferred to Shijiazhuang Gongfu, a China League One club. In July, he returned to Brusque again.

== Honours ==
Barbalha

- Campeonato Cearense Série B: 2018

Icasa

- Campeonato Cearense Série B: 2020

Campinense

- Campeonato Paraibano: 2022

Brusque

- Recopa Catarinense: 2023

Individual

- 2022 Campeonato Paraibano top scorer: 16 goals
