= Cléber (footballer, born 1996) =

Brazilian footballer

Personal information
- Full name: Cléber Bomfim de Jesus
- Date of birth: 22 October 1996 (age 30)
- Place of birth: Salvador, Brazil
- Height: 1.99 m (6 ft 6 in)
- Position: Forward

Team information
- Current team: Yunnan Yukun
- Number: 9

Senior career*
| Years | Team | Apps | (Gls) |
| 2017 | Icasa | 2 | (2) |
| 2017–2020 | Barbalha | 34 | (21) |
| 2018 | → Guarani de Juazeiro (loan) | 3 | (0) |
| 2018–2019 | → Vitória (loan) | 4 | (0) |
| 2019 | → Caucaia (loan) | 8 | (6) |
| 2019 | → Concórdia (loan) | 7 | (2) |
| 2019 | → Guarany de Sobral (loan) | 8 | (3) |
| 2020–2024 | Ceará | 93 | (15) |
| 2025 | Avaí | 51 | (14) |
| 2026– | Yunnan Yukun | 29 | (14) |
- * Club domestic league appearances and goals as of 8 November 2026

Cléber Bomfim de Jesus (born 22 October 1996), simply known as Cléber, is a Brazilian footballer who plays for Yunnan Yukun as a forward.

== Club career ==
=== Early career ===
Born in Salvador, Bahia, Cléber began his career in 2017, when invited to play for Icasa after impressing in a seven-a-side football tournament. After just two matches for the club, he moved to Barbalha, where he helped the club in their promotion to the second division of the Campeonato Cearense as champions.

Cléber was loaned to Guarani de Juazeiro for the 2018 Cearense, but appeared rarely and returned to Barbalha, where he was the top scorer of the second division as his club achieved another promotion as champions. On 18 May of that year, he renewed his contract with Barbalha until 2021, being subsequently loaned to Caucaia in July; the move was later declared void as he joined Vitória instead, also in a temporary deal.

Initially assigned to the under-23s, Cléber made his first team debut for Vitória on 15 January 2019, coming on as a second-half substitute for Eron in a 1–1 away draw against CSA, for the year's Copa do Nordeste. After only four appearances for the club, he left and represented Caucaia, Concórdia and Guarany de Sobral, all on loan from Barbalha; with the first two he achieved promotion to the first division of their respective state championships, while being crowned champions with the former.

=== Ceará ===
Returning to Barbalha for 2020, Cléber scored seven goals in the year's Cearense, which led to a move to Série A side Ceará on 9 March 2020; he agreed to a three-year contract with the club. At the club, he immediately became a starter and scored in both legs of the 2020 Copa do Nordeste Finals, helping Vozão to win the trophy unbeaten during the whole competition.

Cléber made his debut in the top tier on 7 August 2020, starting and scoring his team's first in a 3–2 away loss against Sport Recife.

On 5 January 2026, Cléber joined Chinese Super League club Yunnan Yukun.

== Career statistics ==
As of match played 8 November 2026

Appearances and goals by club, season and competition
| Club | Season | League | | | State League | | Cup | | Continental | | Other | | Total | |
| Club | Season | Division | Apps | Goals | Apps | Goals | Apps | Goals | Apps | Goals | Apps | Goals | Apps | Goals |
|---|---|---|---|---|---|---|---|---|---|---|---|---|---|---|
| Icasa | 2017 | Cearense Série B | — | | 2 | 2 | — | | — | | 3 (Note: Appearance(s) in Copa Fares Lopes) | 2 | 5 | 4 |
| Barbalha | 2017 | Cearense Série C | — | | 6 | 3 | — | | — | | — | | 6 | 3 |
| Barbalha | 2018 | Cearense Série B | — | | 16 | 11 | — | | — | | — | | 16 | 11 |
| Barbalha | 2019 | Cearense | — | | 0 | 0 | — | | — | | — | | 0 | 0 |
| Barbalha | 2020 | Cearense | — | | 12 | 7 | 1 | 0 | — | | — | | 13 | 7 |
| Barbalha | Total | | — | | 34 | 21 | 1 | 0 | — | | — | | 35 | 21 |
| Guarani de Juazeiro (loan) | 2018 | Série D | 0 | 0 | 3 | 0 | — | | — | | — | | 3 | 0 |
| Vitória (loan) | 2018 | Série A | 0 | 0 | — | | 0 | 0 | — | | — | | 0 | 0 |
| Vitória (loan) | 2019 | Série B | 0 | 0 | 1 | 0 | 1 | 0 | — | | 2 (Note: Appearance(s) in Copa do Nordeste) | 0 | 4 | 0 |
| Vitória (loan) | Total | | 0 | 0 | 1 | 0 | 1 | 0 | — | | 2 | 0 | 4 | 0 |
| Caucaia (loan) | 2019 | Cearense Série B | — | | 8 | 6 | — | | — | | — | | 8 | 6 |
| Concórdia (loan) | 2019 | Catarinense Série B | — | | 7 | 2 | — | | — | | — | | 7 | 2 |
| Guarany de Sobral (loan) | 2019 | Cearense | — | | 0 | 0 | — | | — | | 8 | 3 | 8 | 3 |
| Ceará | 2020 | Série A | 33 | 6 | — | | — | | — | | 5 | 2 | 38 | 8 |
| Ceará | 2021 | Série A | 28 | 3 | 4 | 1 | 2 | 1 | 3 (Note: Appearance(s) in Copa Sudamericana) | 0 | 7 | 1 | 44 | 6 |
| Ceará | 2022 | Série A | 21 | 5 | 1 | 0 | 5 | 2 | 6 | 2 | 7 | 0 | 40 | 9 |
| Ceará | 2023 | Série A | 6 | 0 | 0 | 0 | 0 | 0 | — | | 0 | 0 | 6 | 0 |
| Ceará | Total | | 88 | 14 | 5 | 1 | 7 | 3 | 9 | 2 | 19 | 3 | 128 | 23 |
| Avaí | 2025 | Série B | 37 | 13 | 14 | 1 | — | | — | | — | | 51 | 14 |
| Yunnan Yukun | 2026 | Chinese Super League | 29 | 14 | — | | 3 | 1 | — | | — | | 32 | 15 |
| Career total | | | 154 | 41 | 71 | 33 | 12 | 4 | 9 | 2 | 32 | 8 | 278 | 88 |

== Honours ==
Barbalha

- Campeonato Cearense Série B: 2018
- Campeonato Cearense Série C: 2017

Caucaia

- Campeonato Cearense Série B: 2019

Ceará

- Copa do Nordeste: 2020

Avaí

- Campeonato Catarinense: 2025
