= Igor Cariús =

Brazilian footballer (born 1993)

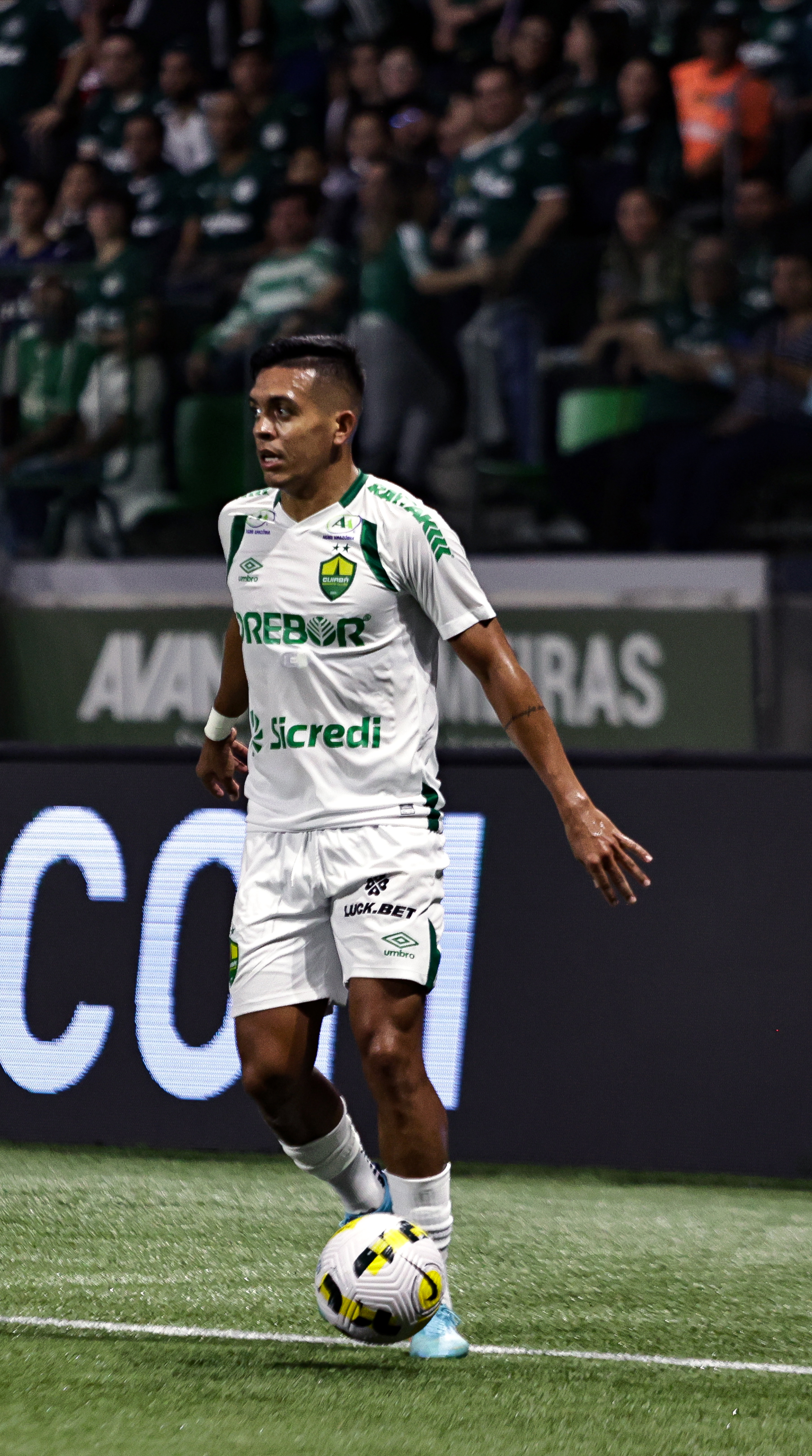

Personal information
- Full name: Igor Aquino da Silva
- Date of birth: 1 May 1993 (age 33)
- Place of birth: Cariús, Brazil
- Height: 1.82 m (6 ft 0 in)
- Position: Left back

Team information
- Current team: Vila Nova (on loan from Mirassol)

Senior career*
Years	Team	Apps	(Gls)
2012–2013	Iguatu	17	(1)
2014	Barbalha	16	(0)
2014	Iguatu	0	(0)
2015	Quixadá	12	(1)
2015–2016	Coruripe	25	(3)
2016	ASA	18	(0)
2017–2018	Paraná	60	(2)
2019–2020	CRB	73	(3)
2021	Atlético Goianiense	38	(2)
2022	Cuiabá	17	(0)
2023–2025	Sport Recife	83	(2)
2026–	Mirassol	4	(0)
2026–	→ Vila Nova (loan)	0	(0)
- * Club domestic league appearances and goals as of 9 April 2026

Igor Aquino da Silva (born 1 May 1993), known as Igor Cariús, is a Brazilian footballer. Mainly a left back. Currently plays for Vila Nova, on loan from Mirassol.

== Career ==
Born in Cariús, Ceará, Igor started his senior career in 2012 with local side Iguatu, and helped the club to win the third division of the Campeonato Cearense. In 2014, he moved to Barbalha, but returned to Iguatu later in the year for the Copa Fares Lopes.

In March 2015, after playing in the year's Cearense with Quixadá, Igor joined Coruripe. He signed for ASA for the 2016 Série C, where he was a regular starter.

On 21 December 2016, Igor agreed to a contract with Paraná in the Série B. He also featured regularly at his new club before moving to fellow second division side CRB on 4 January 2019.

On 9 February 2021, Igor signed a one-year deal with Série A side Atlético Goianiense.

== Personal life ==
Igor's cousin Edson Cariús is also a footballer who plays as a forward. Both played together at Iguatu in 2012, 2013 and 2014, Barbalha in 2014, Quixadá in 2015, Coruripe in 2015 and CRB in 2019. He was involved in the 2023 Brazilian football match-fixing scandal, but was absolved by the STJD on 1 June 2023.

== Career statistics ==
As of 13 October 2021

Club	Season	League			State League		Cup		Continental		Other		Total	
Club	Season	Division	Apps	Goals	Apps	Goals	Apps	Goals	Apps	Goals	Apps	Goals	Apps	Goals
Iguatu	2012	Cearense Série C	—		10	0	—		—		—		10	0
Iguatu	2013	Cearense Série B	—		7	1	—		—		—		7	1
Iguatu	Total		—		17	1	—		—		—		17	1
Barbalha	2014	Cearense Série B	—		16	0	2	0	—		—		18	0
Iguatu	2014	Cearense Série B	—		0	0	—		—		8 (Note: Appearance(s) in Copa Fares Lopes)	1	8	1
Quixadá	2015	Cearense	—		12	1	—		—		—		12	1
Coruripe	2015	Alagoano	—		9	1	1	0	—		—		10	1
Coruripe	2016	Alagoano	—		16	2	2	0	—		5 (Note: Appearance(s) in Copa do Nordeste)	0	23	2
Coruripe	Total		—		25	3	3	0	—		5	0	33	3
ASA	2016	Série C	18	0	—		—		—		—		18	0
Paraná	2017	Série B	30	1	3	1	5	0	—		4 (Note: Appearance(s) in Primeira Liga)	0	42	2
Paraná	2018	Série B	24	0	3	0	0	0	—		—		27	0
Paraná	Total		54	1	6	1	5	0	—		4	0	69	2
CRB	2019	Série B	33	1	7	0	2	0	—		7	0	49	1
CRB	2020	Série B	25	1	8	1	6	0	—		9	1	48	3
CRB	Total		58	2	15	1	8	0	—		16	1	97	4
Atlético Goianiense	2020	Série A	0	0	1	0	—		—		—		1	0
Atlético Goianiense	2021	Série A	27	0	10	1	3	0	4 (Note: Appearance(s) in Copa Sudamericana)	0	—		44	1
Atlético Goianiense	Total		27	0	11	1	3	0	4	0	—		45	1
Cuiabá	2022	Série A	0	0	2	0	0	0	0	0	—		2	0
Career total			157	3	104	8	21	0	4	0	33	2	319	13

== títulos ==
Iguatu

- Campeonato Cearense Série C: 2012

CRB

- Campeonato Alagoano: 2020

Atlético Goianiense

- Campeonato Goiano: 2020, 2021

Cuiabá

- Campeonato Mato-Grossense: 2022

Sport

- Campeonato Pernambucano: 2023, 2024
