= Marcelo Vilar =

Brazilian football manager

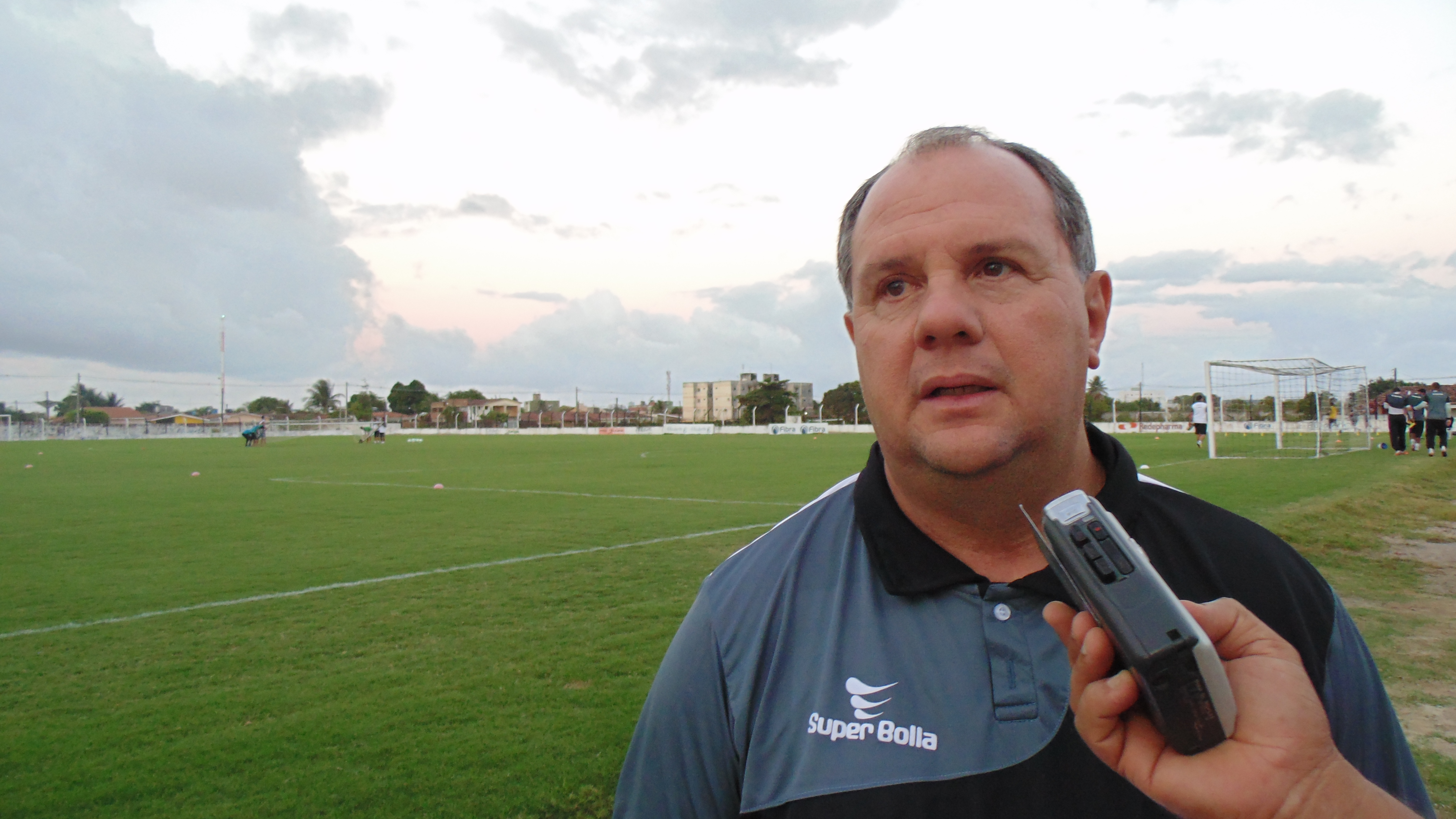

Personal information
- Full name: Marcelo Vilar e Lima Lopes
- Date of birth: 13 May 1961 (age 65)
- Place of birth: Fortaleza, Brazil

Team information
- Current team: Ferroviário (head coach)

Youth career
- Fortaleza
- Ceará

Senior career*
Years	Team	Apps	(Gls)
1981	Ceará		
- Tiradentes

Managerial career
- 1985: Ceará U20
- 1996–1997: Itapipoca
- 1997: Ceará
- 1998: Itapipoca
- 1998: Fortaleza
- 1999: Ferroviário-CE
- 1999–2000: Uniclinic
- 2001: Roma Barueri U20
- 2001–2002: Roma Apucarana
- 2003–2004: Itapipoca
- 2005: Uniclinic
- 2005: Crateús
- 2005: Icasa
- 2006: Palmeiras B
- 2006: Palmeiras (interim)
- 2006: Palmeiras
- 2006–2007: Grêmio Barueri
- 2007: Ceará
- 2007: Adap Galo Maringá
- 2008: Central
- 2008: Treze
- 2009: América de Natal
- 2009: Mixto
- 2010–2012: Treze
- 2013–2015: Botafogo-PB
- 2015: Caxias
- 2016: Treze
- 2017: Ferroviário
- 2017: Moto Club
- 2017: Sergipe
- 2017: ASA
- 2018: Horizonte
- 2018–2019: Ferroviário
- 2019: São Caetano
- 2020: Ferroviária
- 2020: Ríver-PI
- 2020: Ferroviário
- 2021: Botafogo-PB
- 2021: Altos
- 2022: Fluminense-PI
- 2023: Icasa
- 2024: Nacional-AM
- 2024: Manauara
- 2024: Ferroviário
- 2025: Manauara
- 2025: Treze
- 2025–: Ferroviário
- * Club domestic league appearances and goals

Marcelo Vilar e Lima Lopes (born 13 May 1961) is a Brazilian football coach, currently the head coach of Ferroviário.

== Honours ==
=== Manager ===
Ceará

- Campeonato Cearense: 1997

Roma Barueri

- Copa São Paulo de Futebol Júnior: 2001

Treze

- Campeonato Paraibano: 2011, 2012

Botafogo-PB

- Campeonato Brasileiro Série D: 2013
- Campeonato Paraibano: 2013, 2014

Ferroviário-CE

- Campeonato Brasileiro Série D: 2018
- Copa Fares Lopes: 2018

São Caetano

- Copa Paulista: 2019
