= 2014 Campeonato Cearense =

Campeonato Cearense de Futebol
- Season: 2014
- Champions: Ceará
- Relegated: Ferroviário; Tiradentes; Crato
- Copa do Brasil: Ceará; Fortaleza
- Série D: Guarany de Sobral
- Matches played: 92
- Goals scored: 308 (3.35 per match)
- Top goalscorer: Robert (Fortaleza) - 21 goals

The 2014 Campeonato Cearense de Futebol was the 100th season of top professional football league in the state of Ceará, Brazil. The competition began on January 5 and ended on April 23. Ceará won the championship for the 43rd time and 4th since 2011, while Ferroviário, Tiradentes and Crato were relegated.

== Format ==
The championship has three stages. On the first stage, all teams excluding those who are playing in 2014 Copa do Nordeste play a double round robin. The best four teams qualifies to the second stage.

On the second stage, the teams are joined by the clubs from Ceará who were playing on Copa Nordeste. The teams then play a double round robin again, where the best four teams qualifies to the final stage. In the final stage, it's a playoff with four teams.

The champion and the best team on first stage qualifies to the 2015 Copa do Brasil. The champion and the runner-up qualify to the 2015 Copa do Nordeste. The best team who isn't on Campeonato Brasileiro Série A, Série B or Série C qualifies to Série D.

The two worst three in first stage will be relegated.

== Participating teams ==
Club	Home city	2013 result
Ceará	Fortaleza	1st
Crato	Crato	9th
Ferroviário	Fortaleza	8th
Fortaleza	Fortaleza	4th
Guarani de Juazeiro	Juazeiro do Norte	7th
Guarany	Sobral	2nd
Horizonte	Horizonte	6th
Icasa	Juazeiro do Norte	3rd
Itapipoca	Itapipoca	1st (2nd division)
Quixadá	Quixadá	2nd (2nd division)
Tiradentes	Fortaleza	5th

== First stage ==
Pos	Team	Pld	W	D	L	GF	GA	GD	Pts	Qualification or relegation
1	Fortaleza (A)	16	13	3	0	48	14	+34	42	Qualifies to the Second stage and 2015 Copa do Brasil
2	Guarani de Juazeiro (A)	16	7	5	4	17	18	−1	26	Qualify to the Second stage
3	Horizonte (A)	16	6	7	3	26	18	+8	25	Qualify to the Second stage
4	Icasa (A)	16	6	6	4	18	19	−1	24	Qualify to the Second stage
5	Quixadá	16	6	4	6	23	20	+3	22	
6	Itapipoca	16	5	6	5	19	24	−5	21	
7	Ferroviário-CE (R)	16	5	3	8	26	25	+1	18	Relegated
8	Tiradentes (R)	16	2	6	8	26	32	−6	12	Relegated
9	Crato (R)	16	1	2	13	8	40	−32	5	Relegated

(A) Advance to a further round; (R) Relegated

=== Results ===
Home \ Away	CTO	FER	FOR	GUJ	HOR	ICA	ITA	QUI	TIR
Crato		0–1	1–2	0–0	0–2	0–1	0–0	1–2	3–2
Ferroviário-CE	7–2		0–4	5–0	0–3	1–2	0–0	0–0	3–1
Fortaleza	6–0	3–1		3–1	2–1	2–0	7–0	4–2	2–0
Guarani de Juazeiro	1–0	1–0	2–2		0–1	2–1	1–0	4–2	2–2
Horizonte	2–0	2–2	2–2	0–0		3–1	3–4	1–0	2–2
Icasa	2–0	3–2	0–0	1–0	1–1		1–1	0–0	2–2
Itapipoca	2–0	1–0	1–3	0–1	1–1	1–1		2–0	1–1
Quixadá	3–0	1–0	1–3	0–1	2–1	4–1	5–2		2–0
Tiradentes	7–1	2–4	2–3	1–1	1–1	0–1	0–3	3–1	

Legend: Blue = home team win; Yellow = draw; Red = away team win.

== Second stage ==
The four teams from the first stage are joined by Ceará and Guarany de Sobral who were playing on 2014 Copa do Nordeste.

Pos	Team	Pld	W	D	L	GF	GA	GD	Pts	Qualification
1	Fortaleza (A)	10	5	4	1	21	12	+9	19	Qualifies to the Final stage
2	Ceará (A)	10	5	4	1	18	9	+9	19	Qualifies to the Final stage
3	Guarany de Sobral (A)	10	3	4	3	15	13	+2	13	Qualifies to the Final stage
4	Icasa (A)	10	3	3	4	12	14	−2	12	Qualifies to the Final stage
5	Horizonte	10	3	2	5	12	21	−9	11	
6	Guarani de Juazeiro	10	0	5	5	8	17	−9	5	

Rules for classification: 1) points; 2) goal difference; 3) number of goals scored.
(A) Advance to a further round

=== Results ===
Home \ Away	CEA	FOR	GUJ	GNY	HOR	ICA
Ceará		3–1	0–0	1–0	5–1	1–0
Fortaleza	1–1		4–0	3–1	3–2	2–1
Guarani de Juazeiro	0–2	2–2		2–2	1–2	1–1
Guarany de Sobral	1–1	1–1	2–1		5–1	1–2
Horizonte	2–1	1–1	1–0	1–1		0–2
Icasa	3–3	0–3	1–1	0–1	2–1	

Legend: Blue = home team win; Yellow = draw; Red = away team win.

== Final stage ==
Semifinals
1	Fortaleza	1	3	4 (a.g.)
4	Icasa	3	1	4
2	Ceará	3	5	8
3	Guarany de Sobral	2	2	4

Finals
1	Fortaleza	0	0	0
2	Ceará	0	0	0

=== Semifinals ===
==== First leg ====
April 6, 2014
16:00 UTC−03:00

Icasa	3–1	Fortaleza
Douglas 47'; Bismarck 70'; Canga 83'		Wadison 30' (pen.)

Romeirão, Juazeiro do Norte
Attendance: 2,401
Referee: Almeida Filho

April 6, 2014
16:00 UTC−03:00

Guarany de Sobral	2–3	Ceará
Reinaldo Luis 36'; Marcos Vinicius 41'		Magno Alves 34'; Bill 54'; Felipe Amorim 85'

Estádio do Junco, Sobral
Attendance: 4,492
Referee: Péricles Bassols Cortez

==== Second leg ====
April 12, 2014
17:00 UTC−03:00

Fortaleza	3–1	Icasa
Marcelinho Paraíba 42' (pen.); Robert 60', 87'		Bismarck 62'

Estádio Presidente Vargas, Fortaleza
Attendance: 18,727
Referee: Léo Simão Holanda

April 13, 2014
16:00 UTC−03:00

Ceará	5–2	Guarany de Sobral
Magno Alves 43', 73', 75'; Souza 81'; Bill 88'		Zé Williams 53'; Thiago Furlan 57'

Castelão, Fortaleza
Attendance: 8,126
Referee: Luiz Cesar de Oliveira

=== Finals ===
April 16, 2013
22:00 UTC−03:00

Fortaleza	0–0	Ceará

Castelão, Fortaleza
Attendance: 18,412
Referee: Avelar Rodrigo

April 23, 2013
22:00 UTC−03:00

Ceará	0–0	Fortaleza

Castelão, Fortaleza
Attendance: 42,569
Referee: Anderson Daronco

With the results from the Second stage and the final stage aggregated, Ceará won the title because they had a better campaign.
