= Edson Cariús =

Brazilian footballer (born 1988)

Personal information
- Full name: Jose Edson Barros Silva
- Date of birth: 12 October 1988 (age 38)
- Place of birth: Cariús, Brazil
- Height: 1.84 m (6 ft 0 in)
- Position: Forward

Team information
- Current team: Botafogo-SP

Senior career*
Years	Team	Apps	(Gls)
2012–2013	Iguatu	30	(5)
2013–2014	Barbalha	18	(8)
2014	Iguatu	0	(0)
2015	Quixadá	14	(6)
2015	Coruripe	3	(1)
2016	Sousa	7	(1)
2016	Alto Santo	13	(9)
2017	Uniclinic	16	(9)
2017–2018	Floresta	25	(11)
2018–2019	Ferroviário	54	(35)
2019–2021	Fortaleza	16	(4)
2019	→ CRB (loan)	12	(1)
2020–2021	→ Al-Jabalain (loan)	13	(2)
2021	→ Remo (loan)	19	(2)
2021	→ Ferroviário (loan)	13	(3)
2022	Ferroviário	33	(12)
2022	Floresta	5	(1)
2023	Portuguesa da Ilha	7	(2)
2023	Tacuary	12	(1)
2023–	Botafogo-SP	17	(1)
- * Club domestic league appearances and goals as of 11 November 2023

Jose Edson Barros Silva (born 12 October 1988), known as Edson Cariús, is a Brazilian professional footballer who plays as a forward for Botafogo-SP.

== Professional career ==
Cariús quit his career as a motorcycle salesman in 2010 to work professionally as a footballer. He spent his early career with amateur clubs in his state Ceará. Cariús made his professional debut with CRB in a 3-1 Campeonato Brasileiro Série B win over on Brasil de Pelotas on 10 September 2019.

== Personal life ==
Cariús' cousin Igor Cariús is also a footballer who plays as a left back. Both played together at Iguatu in 2012, 2013 and 2014, Barbalha in 2014, Quixadá in 2015, Coruripe in 2015 and CRB in 2019.

== Career statistics ==
As of 28 April 2021

Club	Season	League			State League		Cup		Continental		Other		Total	
Club	Season	Division	Apps	Goals	Apps	Goals	Apps	Goals	Apps	Goals	Apps	Goals	Apps	Goals
Iguatu	2012	Cearense Série C	—		12	4	—		—		—		12	4
Iguatu	2013	Cearense Série B	—		18	1	—		—		—		18	1
Iguatu	Total		—		30	5	—		—		—		30	5
Barbalha	2013	Cearense Série C	—		2	0	—		—		8 (Note: Appearance(s) in Copa Fares Lopes)	5	10	5
Barbalha	2014	Cearense Série B	—		16	8	2	0	—		—		18	8
Barbalha	Total		—		18	8	2	0	—		8	5	28	13
Iguatu	2014	Cearense Série B	—		0	0	—		—		8	1	8	1
Quixadá	2015	Cearense	—		14	6	—		—		—		14	6
Coruripe	2015	Alagoano	—		3	1	0	0	—		—		3	1
Sousa	2016	Paraibano	—		7	1	—		—		—		7	1
Alto Santo	2016	Cearense Série B	—		13	9	—		—		4	4	17	13
Uniclinic	2017	Cearense	—		11	8	1	1	—		4 (Note: Appearance(s) in Copa do Nordeste)	0	16	9
Floresta	2017	Cearense Série B	—		0	0	—		—		10	4	10	4
Floresta	2018	Cearense	—		16	9	1	0	—		—		17	9
Floresta	Total		—		16	9	1	0	—		10	4	27	13
Ferroviário	2018	Série D	15	11	—		—		—		9	4	24	15
Ferroviário	2019	Série C	15	7	13	10	1	2	—		—		29	19
Ferroviário	Total		30	18	13	10	1	2	—		—		44	30
Fortaleza	2019	Série A	0	0	—		—		—		—		0	0
Fortaleza	2020	Série A	1	0	6	4	0	0	0	0	9	0	16	4
Fortaleza	Total		1	0	6	4	0	0	0	0	9	0	16	4
CRB (loan)	2019	Série B	12	2	—		—		—		—		12	2
Al-Jabalain (loan)	2020–21	MS League	13	2	—		—		—		—		13	2
Remo (loan)	2021	Série B	0	0	3	0	1	0	—		—		4	0
Remo (loan)	2021	Série B	7	0	9	2	3	0	—		—		19	2
Ferroviário (loan)	2021	Série C	10	1	—		—		—		3 (Note: Appearance(s) in Copa do Nordeste qualification)	2	13	3
Career total			73	23	140	63	8	3	0	0	55	20	276	109

== Honours ==
Alto Santo

- Campeonato Cearense Série B: 2016

Floresta

- Copa Fares Lopes: 2017

Ferroviário

- Copa Fares Lopes: 2018
- Campeonato Brasileiro Série D: 2018

Fortaleza

- Campeonato Cearense: 2020
