= 2015 Campeonato Cearense =

Campeonato Cearense de Futebol
- Season: 2015
- Champions: Ceará
- Relegated: Horizonte; São Benedito
- Copa do Brasil: Fortaleza; Ceará
- Série D: Guarani de Juazeiro
- Matches played: 76
- Goals scored: 223 (2.93 per match)
- Top goalscorer: Núbio Flávio (Icasa); Assisinho (Ceará) - 10 goals

The 2015 Campeonato Cearense de Futebol was the 101st season of top professional football league in the state of Ceará, Brazil. The competition began on January 14 and ended on May 3. Fortaleza won the championship for the 40th time, while Horizonte and São Benedito were relegated.

== Format ==
The ten teams are split in two groups, who play a double round robin against teams in the same group. The three best in each group advance to the second stage, while the two worst from each group are put in the loser's group.

In the loser's group, the four teams play against each other in a double round-robin, and the two worst are relegated.

In the second stage, the six teams are split in two groups, who play against the other teams in the same group twice. The two best in each group advance to the final stage.

The final stage are playoffs, where the teams are seeded by their performance in the whole championship.

== Participating teams ==
| Club | Home city | 2013 result |
|---|---|---|
| Ceará | Fortaleza | 1st |
| Fortaleza | Fortaleza | 2nd |
| Guarani de Juazeiro | Juazeiro do Norte | 6th |
| Guarany | Sobral | 4th |
| Horizonte | Horizonte | 5th |
| Icasa | Juazeiro do Norte | 3rd |
| Itapipoca | Itapipoca | 8th |
| Maranguape | Maranguape | 2nd (2nd division) |
| Quixadá | Quixadá | 7th |
| São Benedito | São Benedito | 1st (2nd division) |

== First stage ==
=== Group A1 ===
| Pos | Team | Pld | W | D | L | GF | GA | GD | Pts | Qualification |
|---|---|---|---|---|---|---|---|---|---|---|
| 1 | Icasa (A) | 8 | 5 | 1 | 2 | 15 | 11 | +4 | 16 | Qualifies to the Second stage |
| 2 | Fortaleza (A) | 8 | 4 | 3 | 1 | 13 | 7 | +6 | 15 | Qualifies to the Second stage |
| 3 | Quixadá (A) | 8 | 4 | 2 | 2 | 10 | 7 | +3 | 14 | Qualifies to the Second stage |
| 4 | Horizonte | 8 | 2 | 2 | 4 | 10 | 13 | −3 | 8 | Advances to Loser's Group |
| 5 | São Benedito | 8 | 1 | 0 | 7 | 9 | 19 | −10 | 3 | Advances to Loser's Group |

(A) Advance to a further round

==== Results ====
| Home \ Away | FOR | HOR | ICA | QUI | SBE |
|---|---|---|---|---|---|
| Fortaleza | | 1–1 | 1–0 | 0–0 | 3–2 |
| Horizonte | 1–3 | | 1–1 | 1–2 | 1–0 |
| Icasa | 2–0 | 4–3 | | 1–0 | 2–1 |
| Quixadá | 0–0 | 1–0 | 2–4 | | 2–0 |
| São Benedito | 1–5 | 1–2 | 2–1 | 1–3 | |

Legend: Blue = home team win; Yellow = draw; Red = away team win.

=== Group A2 ===
| Pos | Team | Pld | W | D | L | GF | GA | GD | Pts | Qualification |
|---|---|---|---|---|---|---|---|---|---|---|
| 1 | Ceará (A) | 8 | 6 | 1 | 1 | 18 | 7 | +11 | 19 | Qualifies to the Second stage |
| 2 | Maranguape (A) | 8 | 4 | 0 | 4 | 11 | 11 | 0 | 12 | Qualifies to the Second stage |
| 3 | Guarani de Juazeiro (A) | 8 | 3 | 1 | 4 | 11 | 9 | +2 | 10 | Qualifies to the Second stage |
| 4 | Guarany de Sobral | 8 | 3 | 1 | 4 | 5 | 11 | −6 | 10 | Advances to Loser's Group |
| 5 | Itapipoca | 8 | 2 | 1 | 5 | 4 | 11 | −7 | 7 | Advances to Loser's Group |

Rules for classification: 1) points; 2) goal difference; 3) number of goals scored.
(A) Advance to a further round

==== Results ====
| Home \ Away | CEA | GJU | GSO | ITA | MFC |
|---|---|---|---|---|---|
| Ceará | | 1–0 | 4–0 | 3–0 | 4–3 |
| Guarani de Juazeiro | 2–2 | | 2–0 | 0–1 | 1–2 |
| Guarany de Sobral | 2–1 | 1–3 | | 1–0 | 0–1 |
| Itapipoca | 0–2 | 0–2 | 0–0 | | 2–1 |
| Maranguape | 0–1 | 0–1 | 2–1 | 2–1 | |

Legend: Blue = home team win; Yellow = draw; Red = away team win.

== Second stage ==
=== Group B1 ===
| Pos | Team | Pld | W | D | L | GF | GA | GD | Pts | Qualification |
|---|---|---|---|---|---|---|---|---|---|---|
| 1 | Fortaleza (A) | 6 | 4 | 1 | 1 | 11 | 3 | +8 | 13 | Qualifies to the Final stage |
| 2 | Icasa (A) | 6 | 3 | 1 | 2 | 11 | 8 | +3 | 10 | Qualifies to the Final stage |
| 3 | Quixadá | 6 | 3 | 1 | 2 | 11 | 9 | +2 | 10 | |

Rules for classification: 1) points; 2) goal difference; 3) number of goals scored.
(A) Advance to a further round

=== Group B2 ===
| Pos | Team | Pld | W | D | L | GF | GA | GD | Pts | Qualification |
|---|---|---|---|---|---|---|---|---|---|---|
| 1 | Ceará (A) | 6 | 3 | 1 | 2 | 10 | 8 | +2 | 10 | Qualifies to the Final stage |
| 2 | Guarani de Juazeiro (A) | 6 | 1 | 1 | 4 | 3 | 8 | −5 | 4 | Qualifies to the Final stage |
| 3 | Maranguape | 6 | 1 | 1 | 4 | 7 | 17 | −10 | 4 | |

Rules for classification: 1) points; 2) goal difference; 3) number of goals scored.
(A) Advance to a further round

=== Results ===
| Home \ Away | FOR | ICA | QUI | CEA | GJU | MFC |
|---|---|---|---|---|---|---|
| Fortaleza | | | | 0–1 | 2–0 | 1–1 |
| Icasa | | | | 2–2 | 3–0 | 2–3 |
| Quixadá | | | | 3–1 | 0–2 | 4–1 |
| Ceará | 1–2 | 2–0 | 3–1 | | | |
| Guarani de Juazeiro | 0–1 | 0–1 | 1–1 | | | |
| Maranguape | 0–5 | 1–3 | 1–2 | | | |

Legend: Blue = home team win; Yellow = draw; Red = away team win.

=== Loser's group ===
| Pos | Team | Pld | W | D | L | GF | GA | GD | Pts | Relegation |
|---|---|---|---|---|---|---|---|---|---|---|
| 1 | Guarany de Sobral | 6 | 4 | 2 | 0 | 13 | 8 | +5 | 14 | |
| 2 | Itapipoca | 6 | 2 | 2 | 2 | 14 | 15 | −1 | 8 | |
| 3 | Horizonte | 6 | 2 | 1 | 3 | 13 | 11 | +2 | 7 | Relegation to 2016 Campeonato Cearense Second Division |
| 4 | São Benedito | 6 | 0 | 3 | 3 | 9 | 15 | −6 | 3 | Relegation to 2016 Campeonato Cearense Second Division |

Updated to match(es) played on unknown. Source:

== Final stage ==
Semifinals
1 | Ceará | 1 | 3 | 4
4 | Guarani de Juazeiro | 0 | 0 | 0
2 | Fortaleza | 2 | 0 | 2
3 | Icasa | 1 | 0 | 1

Finals
1 | Ceará | 1 | 2 | 3
2 | Fortaleza | 2 | 2 | 4

=== Semifinals ===
==== First leg ====
April 4, 2015
18:15 UTC−03:00

| Guarani de Juazeiro | 0–1 | Ceará |
|---|---|---|
| | | Assisinho 78' |

Romeirão, Juazeiro do Norte
Attendance: 1,521
Referee: José Cleuton Souza Lima

April 5, 2015
16:00 UTC−03:00

| Icasa | 1–2 | Fortaleza |
|---|---|---|
| Everton 79' | | Cássio 36'; Lúcio Maranhão 86' |

Romeirão, Juazeiro do Norte
Attendance: 4,876
Referee: Francisco Almeida Filho

==== Second leg ====
April 12, 2015
16:00 UTC−03:00

| Fortaleza | 0–0 | Icasa |

Castelão, Fortaleza
Referee: Glauco Feitosa

April 18, 2015
18:15 UTC−03:00

| Ceará | 3–0 | Guarani de Juazeiro |
|---|---|---|
| Magno Alves 31'; Marinho 48'; Marcos Aurélio 90+2' |

Estádio Presidente Vargas, Fortaleza

=== Finals ===
April 26, 2015
16:00 UTC−03:00

| Fortaleza | 2–1 | Ceará |
|---|---|---|
| Genílson 15'; Everton 36' | | Magno Alves 41' |

Castelão, Fortaleza

May 3, 2015
16:00 UTC−03:00

| Ceará | 2–2 | Fortaleza |
|---|---|---|
| Ricardinho 81'; Assisinho 90' | | Daniel Sobralense 31'; Cassiano 90+2' |

Castelão, Fortaleza
