= Rayr =

Brazilian footballer

Personal information
- Full name: Francisco Rayr Miller Moreira de Freitas
- Date of birth: 28 February 1999 (age 27)
- Place of birth: Ibicuitinga, Brazil
- Position: Goalkeeper

Youth career
- 2012–2013: Grêmio
- 2014–2017: São José-RS
- 2018–2019: Ceará
- 2019–2020: Atlético Cearense

Senior career*
Years	Team	Apps	(Gls)
2019–2021	Atlético Cearense	2	(0)
2020	→ Crato (loan)	1	(0)
2020	→ Tianguá (loan)	6	(1)
2021	→ Horizonte (loan)	9	(0)
2022	Maracanã	7	(0)
2022	Itapipoca	2	(0)
2022	Guarany de Sobral	1	(0)
2023	Maracanã	14	(0)
2023	Pacatuba	2	(0)
2023	Pacajus	3	(0)
2024	Maracanã	5	(0)
2024	Crato	6	(0)
2024	Ferroviário	2	(0)
2025–	Maracanã	17	(0)
- * Club domestic league appearances and goals as of 22 May 2025

Francisco Rayr Miller Moreira de Freitas (born 28 February 1999), simply known as Rayr, is a Brazilian professional footballer who plays as a goalkeeper.

== Career ==
Rayr began his career in 2013, when he came from his hometown Itacuitinga for a tryout and was accepted into Grêmio at the age of 14. He stayed at the club until the following year, and from 2014 to 2017 he was at EC São José, also from Porto Alegre. He returned to his state in 2018 to Ceará SC aged 18. As a professional, Rayr played for several clubs, such as Atlético Cearense, Maracanã among others.

On 16 February 2021, Rayr scored an injury time winning goal from a header, against Maracanã, at the Campeonato Cearense Série C.

On 22 May 2025, playing for Maracanã, Rayr became a highlight in the return match against SC Internacional, in the third phase of the 2025 Copa do Brasil, where he saved three penalty kicks during the game.

== Honours ==
Ferroviário

- Copa Fares Lopes: 2024

== See also ==
- List of goalscoring goalkeepers
