= 2016 Campeonato Cearense =

Campeonato Cearense de Futebol
- Season: 2016

The 2016 Campeonato Cearense de Futebol was the 102nd season of top professional football league in the state of Ceará, Brazil. The competition began in January and will end in May.

== Format ==
The ten teams are split in two groups, who play a double round robin against teams in the same group. The three best in each group advance to the second stage, while the two worst from each group are put in the loser's group.

In the loser's group, the four teams play against each other in a double round-robin, and the two worst are relegated.

In the second stage, the six teams are split in two groups, who play against the other teams in the same group twice. The two best in each group advance to the final stage.

The final stage are playoffs, where the teams are seeded by their performance in the whole championship.

== Participating teams ==
Club	Home city
Ceará	Fortaleza
Fortaleza	Fortaleza
Guarani de Juazeiro	Juazeiro do Norte
Guarany	Sobral
Icasa	Juazeiro do Norte
Itapipoca	Itapipoca
Maranguape	Maranguape
Quixadá	Quixadá
Tiradentes	Fortaleza
Uniclinic	Fortaleza

== First stage ==
=== Group A1 ===
Pos	Team	Pld	W	D	L	GF	GA	GD	Pts	Qualification
1	Fortaleza	7	5	1	1	16	6	+10	16	Second phase
2	Uniclinic	7	5	0	2	11	8	+3	15	Second phase
3	Maranguape	7	3	1	3	9	9	0	10	Second phase
4	Icasa	7	1	2	4	7	13	−6	5	Relegation phase
5	Itapipoca	8	1	2	5	3	10	−7	5	Relegation phase

Updated to match(es) played on 26 February 2016. Source: Group A1 Standings
Rules for classification: 1) points; 2) goal difference; 3) number of goals scored.

=== Group A2 ===
Pos	Team	Pld	W	D	L	GF	GA	GD	Pts	Qualification
1	Ceará	7	6	0	1	11	2	+9	18	Second phase
2	Guarany de Sobral	6	3	1	2	5	5	0	10	Second phase
3	Guarani de Juazeiro	6	2	2	2	6	6	0	8	Second phase
4	Tiradentes	7	1	3	3	6	9	−3	6	Relegation phase
5	Quixadá	6	0	2	4	2	8	−6	2	Relegation phase

Updated to match(es) played on 25 February 2016. Source: Group A2 Standings
Rules for classification: 1) points; 2) goal difference; 3) number of goals scored.
