= 2017 Campeonato Cearense =

Campeonato Cearense Série A
- Season: 2017
- Dates: Start date: 15 January 2017
- Teams: 10
- Champions: Ceará
- Relegated: Guarany de Sobral; Itapipoca
- Matches played: 49
- Goals scored: 137 (2.8 per match)
- Top goalscorer: Leílson Guarani de Juazeiro
- Biggest home win: Fortaleza 5–0 Itapipoca (March 4)
- Biggest away win: Horizante 0-4 Uniclinic (Feb 25)
- Highest attendance: 26,157
- Average attendance: 2109

The 2017 Campeonato Cearense is the 103rd season of Ceará's top football league. Ceará won the league for the 44th time.

== Format ==
First Round

- All the ten teams play each other once.
- The top eight teams go to the Final Rounds.
- The bottom two teams are relegated.

Final Rounds

- The eight teams are paired according to their ranking:
- 1 vs. 8 (Game 1)
- 2 vs. 7 (Game 2)
- 3 vs. 6 (Game 3)
- 4 vs. 5 (Game 4)
- The games are played over two legs. The better teams hosts the second leg.
- The winners are again paired according to their ranking:
- Winners Game 1 vs. Winners Game 4
- Winners Game 2 vs. Winners Game 3
- The games are this time played over three legs. When a team wins a leg, they gain three points. When a leg is tied, each team gets one point, and when a team loses, they gain zero points. The team with the most points at the end of the three legs moves on. If one team wins the first two legs, no third leg is played. The better team hosts the second and third legs.
- The winners of the semi-finals go on to the final, played the same way as the semi-finals.

Qualification

- The top two teams not already playing in Série A, Série B, or
  Série C, or already assured qualification to Série D qualify for the 2018 Campeonato Brasileiro Série D.
- The winner and runner-up qualify for the 2018 Copa do Brasil.
- The winner and runner-up qualify for the 2018 Copa do Nordeste.

== Teams ==
Club	Home city	2016 Result
Ceará	Fortaleza	5th
Ferroviário-CE	Fortaleza	3rd (Série B) (Note: Ferroviário-CE were promoted from instead of Alto Santo, who came in second and should have been promoted.)
Fortaleza	Fortaleza	1st
Guarani de Juazeiro	Juazeiro do Norte	3rd
Guarany de Sobral	Sobral	4th
Horizante	Horizonte	1st (Série B)
Itapipoca	Itapipoca	8th
Maranguape	Maranguape	6th
Tiradentes	Fortaleza	7th
Uniclinic	Fortaleza	2nd

== First round ==
Pos	Team	Pld	W	D	L	GF	GA	GD	Pts	Qualification or relegation
1	Ceará	9	6	2	1	12	5	+7	20	Advance to Semi-Finals
2	Fortaleza	9	5	2	2	16	5	+11	17	Advance to Semi-Finals
3	Horizante	9	5	0	4	14	11	+3	15	Advance to Semi-Finals
4	Guarani de Juazeiro	9	4	3	2	15	9	+6	15	Advance to Semi-Finals
5	Maranguape	9	4	2	3	11	13	−2	14	Advance to Semi-Finals
6	Ferroviário-CE	9	3	4	2	12	8	+4	13	Advance to Semi-Finals
7	Tiradentes	9	3	2	4	15	14	+1	11	Advance to Semi-Finals
8	Uniclinic	9	2	3	4	13	18	−5	9	Advance to Semi-Finals
9	Guarany de Sobral	9	1	3	5	10	19	−9	6	Relegated to 2018 Campeonato Cearense Série B
10	Itapipoca	9	0	3	6	6	22	−16	3	Relegated to 2018 Campeonato Cearense Série B

== Final Rounds ==
=== Quarter-finals ===
19 March 2017
16:00 UTC–4

Uniclinic	1-3	Ceará
Preto 81'	Report	39', 71' Magno Alves; 86' Cametá

Castelão, Fortaleza
Attendance: 5195
Referee: Leo Simão

25 March 2017
16:00 UTC–4

Ceará	4-1	Uniclinic
Luiz Otávio 19'; Victor Rangel 51'; Magno Alves 55', 88'	Report	80' (Pen.) Netinho; (yellow card) 58' (red card) Luis Fernando

Castelão, Fortaleza
Attendance: 5642
Referee: Luis César De Oliveira Magalhães

Ceará win 7–2 on Aggregate.

18 March 2017
16:00 UTC–4

Maranguape	1-1	Guarani de Juazeiro
Jair 89'	Report	71' Leílson

Estádio Domingão, Horizonte
Attendance: 350
Referee: Wladyerisson Silva Oliveira

18 March 2017
16:00 UTC–4

Guarani de Juazeiro	5-1	Maranguape
Ítalo 30', 57'; Da Silva 45'; Ademilson 51'; Zé Aquiras 89'	Report	22' Albano

Romeirão, Juazeiro do Norte
Attendance: 1607
Referee: Renato Pinheiro

Guarani de Juazeiro win 6–2 on Aggregate.

12 March 2017
16:00 UTC–4

Ferroviário-CE	1-1	Horizante
Jonathas 13'	Report	63' Doda

Castelão, Fortaleza
Attendance: 1567
Referee: Édson Galvão da Silva

26 March 2017
16:00 UTC–4

Horizante	1 (2)-(4) 1 (a.e.t.)	Ferroviário-CE
Berg 10'	Report	14' Jonathas
Penalties
Robert (penalty missed); César Sampaio (penalty scored); Canga (penalty scored); Doda (penalty missed)	2-4	(penalty scored) Assizinho; (penalty scored) Maxwell; (penalty scored) Jonathas; (penalty scored) Vitinho

Estádio Domingão, Horizonte
Attendance: 2391
Referee: Glauco Feitosa

Ferroviário-CE win on penalties after a 2–2 tie on Aggregate

15 March 2017
21:45 UTC–4

Tiradentes	2-3	Fortaleza
Cleiton 1'; Wilkson 50'	Report	28' Max Oliveira; 66', 76' Lúcio Flávio; (yellow card) 81' (red card) Felipe

Castelão, Fortaleza
Attendance: 3073
Referee: Gleysto Gonçalves da Silva

26 March 2017
16:00 UTC–4

Fortaleza	3-0	Tiradentes
Lúcio Flávio 75'; Zé Carlos 84', 89' (Pen.)	Report

Castelão, Fortaleza
Attendance: 5842
Referee: Avelar Rodrigo Da Silva

Fortaleza wins 6–2 on Aggregate

=== Semi-finals ===
2 April 2017
16:00 UTC–4

Ferroviário-CE	2-0	Fortaleza
Tony 49'; Mota 78'	Report

Castelão, Fortaleza
Attendance: 8724
Referee: Magno Cordeiro

9 April 2017
16:00 UTC–4

Fortaleza	1-1	Ferroviário-CE
Anderson 28'	Report	90+5' Mimi

Castelão, Fortaleza
Attendance: 10958
Referee: Leo Simão

19 April 2017
21:45 UTC–4

Fortaleza	0-0	Ferroviário-CE
	Report	(yellow card) 62' (red card) Moises Lucas

Castelão, Fortaleza
Attendance: 10855
Referee: Luis César De Oliveira Magalhães

Ferroviário-CE win with 5 points, to Fortaleza's 2 points

5 April 2017
21:45 UTC–4

Guarani de Juazeiro	0-0	Ceará
	Report

Romeirão, Juazeiro do Norte
Attendance: 3196
Referee: Édson Galvão da Silva

16 April 2017
16:00 UTC–4

Ceará	1-0	Guarani de Juazeiro
Lelê 82'; Magno Alves 90'	Report

Castelão, Fortaleza
Attendance: 7127
Referee: Wladyerisson Silva Oliveira

22 April 2017
16:00 UTC–4

Ceará	1-0	Guarani de Juazeiro
Alex Amado 71'	Report

Castelão, Fortaleza
Attendance: 8657
Referee: Leo Simão

Ceará win with 7 points to Guarani de Juazeiro's 1 point.

=== Final ===
30 April 2017
16:00 UTC–4

Ferroviário-CE	0-1	Ceará
	Report	19' Wallace Pernambucano

Castelão, Fortaleza
Attendance: 13978
Referee: Wladyerisson Silva Oliveira

3 May 2017
21:45 UTC–4

Ceará	2-0	Ferroviário-CE
Wallace Pernambucano 40'; Raul 84'	Report

Castelão, Fortaleza
Attendance: 26157
Referee: Luis César De Oliveira Magalhães

A third match was not necessary. Ceará wins with 6 points to Ferroviário-CE's 0 points.

Campeonato Cearense
2017 champion
Ceará
44th title

Ferroviário-CE and Guarani de Juazeiro qualify for 2018 Campeonato Brasileiro Série D
Ceará and Ferroviário-CE qualify for the 2018 Copa do Brasil.
Ceará and Ferroviário-CE qualify for the 2018 Copa do Nordeste.

== Topscorers ==
Rank	Player	Club	Goals
1.	(Brazil) Leílson	Guarani de Juazeiro	9
2.	(Brazil) Edson Carius	Uniclinic	8
3.	(Brazil) Magno Alves	Ceará	7
4.	(Brazil) Lúcio Flávio	Fortaleza	6
4.	(Brazil) Maxuell	Ferroviário-CE	6
5.	(Brazil) Isac	Horizante	5
5.	(Brazil) Ítalo	Guarani de Juazeiro	5
5.	(Brazil) Gugu	Maranguape	5
6.	(Brazil) Canga	Horizante	4
