= Mauro Iguatu =

Brazilian footballer (born 1987)

Personal information
- Full name: Mauro Gomes de Lima
- Date of birth: 14 November 1987 (age 38)
- Place of birth: Simplício Mendes, Brazil
- Height: 1.90 m (6 ft 3 in)
- Position: Goalkeeper

Team information
- Current team: Iguatu

Senior career*
Years	Team	Apps	(Gls)
2007–2015	Icasa		
2007	→ Barbalha (loan)		
2008	→ Atlético Cajazeirense (loan)		
2009	→ Barbalha (loan)		
2010	→ Corintians de Caicó (loan)		
2011	→ América de Natal (loan)		
2012	→ Nacional de Patos (loan)		
2013	→ Nacional de Patos (loan)		
2015	Atlético Sorocaba		
2016	Alto Santo		
2017	Ferroviário		
2017	Guarani de Juazeiro		
2017–2018	Floresta		
2018–2019	Treze		
2020	Guarany de Sobral		
2020–2021	Icasa		
2021	4 de Julho		
2021–2022	Campinense	59	(2)
2022	→ Serra Branca (loan)		
2023	Nacional de Patos		
2024–2025	Iguatu		
2025–	Teresina		
- * Club domestic league appearances and goals as of 13 October 2025

Mauro Gomes de Lima (born 14 November 1987), better known as Mauro Iguatu, is a Brazilian professional footballer who plays as a goalkeeper for Iguatu.

== Career ==
Mauro Iguatu began his career at Icasa, and in Ceará football he achieved most of his achievements. In 2018, he was part of the squad that conquered the promotion to Série C with Treze FC. He transferred to rival Campinense, where he was twice state champion in addition to gaining access again. For Campinense he also accomplished the feat of scoring two goals, from penalties.

In 2023 he transferred to Nacional de Patos. In October 2023, Mauro signed with AD Iguatu.

== Honours ==
Icasa

- Copa Fares Lopes: 2014
- Campeonato Cearense Série B: 2010

Floresta

- Copa Fares Lopes: 2017

Campinense

- Campeonato Paraibano: 2021, 2022

Serra Branca

- Campeonato Paraibano Second Division: 2022

== See also ==
- List of goalscoring goalkeepers
