= Alex Maranhão =

Brazilian footballer (born 1985)

Personal information
- Full name: Alexsandro Carvalho Lopes
- Date of birth: 30 April 1985 (age 41)
- Place of birth: São Luís, Brazil
- Height: 1.72 m (5 ft 7 1/2 in)
- Position: Midfielder

Senior career*
Years	Team	Apps	(Gls)
2004	Uniclinic	6	(0)
2005	Criciúma	14	(4)
2005	Ceará	3	(0)
2006	→ Icasa (loan)	3	(0)
2006	→ Madureira (loan)	7	(1)
2007	Ituano	18	(5)
2008	Nanchang Bayi	21	(0)
2009–2010	Bahia	15	(1)
2010	→ Sertãozinho (loan)	10	(0)
2010	→ Treze (loan)	1	(0)
2010	→ Beira-Mar (loan)	5	(0)
2011–2012	Grêmio Barueri	44	(7)
2013	Nacional-MG	9	(3)
2013	Fortaleza	6	(0)
2014	Grêmio Barueri	22	(3)
2015	Ismaily	12	(0)
2015	Sampaio Corrêa	15	(1)
2016	Guarani de Palhoça	17	(6)
2017–2018	Criciúma	110	(22)
2019	São Bento	10	(0)
2019	Ponte Preta	11	(1)
2020	Paysandu	25	(5)
2021	União Esporte	8	(3)
2021	Barra-SC	14	(2)
2022	União Esporte	11	(2)
2022	Metropolitano	1	(1)
- * Club domestic league appearances and goals as of 26 May 2022

Alexsandro Carvalho Lopes or simply Alex Maranhão (born 30 April 1985) is a Brazilian former professional footballer.

He used to play for the Chinese club Nanchang Bayi in 2008.

He transferred to Portuguese Primeira Liga side S.C. Beira-Mar in July 2010.

== Personal life ==
Alex Maranhão's daughter Taina is also a footballer.

== Honours ==
Criciúma

- Campeonato Catarinense: 2005

Icasa

- Copa Integração: 2007

Fortaleza

- Campeonato Cearense: 2009
