= 2012 Campeonato Cearense =

Campeonato Cearense de Futebol
- Season: 2012
- Champions: Ceará
- Relegated: Itapipoca; Trairiense; Crateús
- Copa do Brasil: Ceará; Fortaleza
- Série D: Horizonte
- Matches: 138
- Goals: 407 (2.95 per match)
- Top goalscorer: Felipe Azevedo(Ceará) - 16 goals

The 2012 Campeonato Cearense de Futebol was the 98th season of the top professional football league in the state of Ceará, Brazil. The competition began on January 18 and ended on May 13. Ceará won the championship for the 41st time, while Itapipoca, Trairiense and Crateús were relegated.

== Format ==
Each team plays the other once in a round-robin format followed by four team playoff with home-and-away series.

=== Qualifications ===
The two teams on the finals will qualify for the 2013 Copa do Brasil and 2013 Copa do Nordeste. The best team not playing in Campeonato Brasileiro Série A, B or C will qualify for 2012 Campeonato Brasileiro Série D.

== Teams ==
Club	Home city	2011 result
Ceará	Fortaleza	1st
Crateús	Crateús	2nd (2nd division)
Crato	Crato	9th
Ferroviário	Fortaleza	10th
Fortaleza	Fortaleza	3rd
Guarani de Juazeiro	Juazeiro do Norte	2nd
Guarany	Sobral	5th
Horizonte	Horizonte	4th
Icasa	Juazeiro do Norte	8th
Itapipoca	Itapipoca	7th
Tiradentes	Fortaleza	6th
Trairiense	Trairi	1st (2nd division)

== First stage ==
=== Standings ===
Pos	Team	Pld	W	D	L	GF	GA	GD	Pts	Qualification
1	Ceará	22	17	3	2	52	17	+35	54	Advanced to the Semifinals
2	Fortaleza	22	16	4	2	42	19	+23	52	Advanced to the Semifinals
3	Horizonte	22	14	2	6	50	30	+20	44	Advanced to the Semifinals
4	Tiradentes	22	11	5	6	36	29	+7	38	Advanced to the Semifinals
5	Crato	22	9	7	6	28	26	+2	34	
6	Guarani de Juazeiro	22	9	2	11	36	36	0	29	
7	Guarany de Sobral	22	6	7	9	28	33	−5	25	
8	Icasa	22	7	4	11	22	38	−16	25	
9	Ferroviário-CE	22	5	6	11	29	42	−13	21	
10	Trairiense	22	4	5	13	27	40	−13	17	
11	Crateús	22	7	5	10	30	36	−6	13 (Note: Crateús was docked 13 points for using an irregular player)	
12	Itapipoca	22	1	4	17	13	47	−34	7	

Updated to match(es) played on 17 April 2012. Source:
Rules for classification: 1st points; 2nd goal difference; 3rd number of goals scored; 4th less red cards; 5th less yellow cards; 6th raffle;

=== Results ===
Home \ Away	CEA	CTE	CTO	FER	FOR	GNI	GNY	HOR	ICA	ITA	TIR	TRA
Ceará		2–1	2–2	1–0	1–2	5–0	3–1	3–0	2–0	3–0	5–1	2–1
Crateús	1–1		2–1	2–1	1–2	1–4	1–0	1–1	3–0	4–2	1–1	1–0
Crato	2–4	1–0		2–0	0–0	1–0	3–2	0–2	2–0	3–0	1–2	1–1
Ferroviário-CE	1–2	3–3	0–1		1–3	2–1	3–2	1–4	0–1	1–1	3–3	3–2
Fortaleza	0–1	4–0	1–0	4–1		3–2	2–1	3–2	2–0	2–0	3–1	1–0
Guarani de Juazeiro	0–3	2–2	2–2	3–2	2–3		0–1	1–0	2–1	5–0	0–1	4–0
Guarany de Sobral	1–1	0–1	1–1	1–1	1–1	2–1		2–4	3–1	2–0	3–2	2–1
Horizonte	0–3	3–2	5–1	3–0	1–0	0–1	1–1		5–0	3–1	1–2	4–1
Icasa	2–0	2–1	0–1	0–0	1–2	3–2	1–1	2–3		3–0	0–2	2–1
Itapipoca	0–3	1–0	1–2	1–3	0–1	0–2	0–0	1–2	2–2		1–1	0–1
Tiradentes	1–3	3–2	0–0	1–2	0–0	4–0	1–0	1–2	3–0	2–1		3–1
Trairiense	1–2	2–0	1–1	1–1	3–3	0–2	4–1	3–4	1–1	2–1	0–1	

Legend: Blue = home team win; Yellow = draw; Red = away team win.

== Final Stage ==
Semifinals
1	Ceará	2	4	6
4	Tiradentes	0	0	0
2	Fortaleza	4	1	5
3	Horizonte	1	0	1

Finals
1	Ceará	0	1	1
2	Fortaleza	0	1	1

=== Semifinals ===
==== First leg ====
April 22, 2013
16:00 UTC−03:00

Tiradentes	0–2	Ceará
	Report	Régis 24'; Felipe Azevedo 26'

Estádio Presidente Vargas, Fortaleza
Attendance: 5,056
Referee: Almeida Filho

April 22, 2013
16:00 UTC−03:00

Horizonte	1–4	Fortaleza
Elanardo 59'	Report	Jailson 09'; Geraldo 18'; Marielson 65'; Cléo 74'

Domingão, Horizonte
Attendance: 4,668
Referee: Evandro Roman

==== Second leg ====
April 28, 2013
16:20 UTC−03:00

Fortaleza	1–0	Horizonte
Ciro Sena 48'	Report

Estádio Presidente Vargas, Fortaleza
Attendance: 9,712
Referee: Avelar Rodrigo

April 29, 2013
16:00 UTC−03:00

Ceará	4–0	Tiradentes
Régis 01'; Apodi 35'; Mota 37', 57'	Report

Estádio Presidente Vargas, Fortaleza
Attendance: 6,550
Referee: Luzimar Siqueira

=== Finals ===
May 6, 2013
16:00 UTC−03:00

Fortaleza	0–0	Ceará
	Report

Estádio Presidente Vargas, Fortaleza
Attendance: 13,832
Referee: Héber Roberto Lopes

May 13, 2013
16:00 UTC−03:00

Ceará	1–1	Fortaleza
Felipe Azevedo 76'	Report	Jailson 61'

Estádio Presidente Vargas, Fortaleza
Attendance: 15,967
Referee: Ricardo Marques Ribeiro

Ceará won due to better campaign on First stage.

== Top goalscorers ==
Rank	Name	Club	Goals
1	(Brazil) Felipe Azevedo	Ceará	16
2	(Brazil) André Cassaco	Horizonte	15
3	(Brazil) Mota	Ceará	14
3	(Brazil) Alex Paraíba	Trairiense	14
5	(Brazil) Moré	Guarani de Juazeiro	13
6	(Brazil) Canga	Ferroviário	9
6	(Brazil) Geraldo	Fortaleza	9
8	(Brazil) Romário	Ceará	8
8	(Brazil) Elanardo	Horizonte	8
8	(Brazil) Vanger	Horizonte	8
8	(Brazil) Wanderley	Horizonte	8

Source Federação Cearense de Futebol
Last updated: 14 May 2012
