= Campeonato Cearense de Futebol Feminino =

Women's football league in Ceará, Brazil

- Founded: 1983
- Country: Brazil
- Confederation: FCF
- Promotion to: Brasileiro Série A3
- Current champions: Fortaleza (4th title) (2025)
- Most championships: Caucaia (6 titles)
- Current: 2026

The Campeonato Cearense de Futebol Feminino is the women's football state championship of Ceará State, and is contested since 1983.

== List of champions ==
Following is the list with all recognized titles of Campeonato Cearense Feminino:

Season	Champions	Runners-up
1983	Ferroviário (1)	Salgado da Gama
1984–2007	Not held	
2008	Caucaia (1)	Floresta
2009	Caucaia (2)	Ceará
2010	Fortaleza (1)	Caucaia
2011	Caucaia (3)	Guarany de Sobral
2012	Caucaia (4)	América
2013	Caucaia (5)	Juventus
2014	Juventus (1)	Rio Branco
2015	Caucaia (6)	Juventus
2016	Menina Olímpica (1)	Fortaleza
2017	São Gonçalo (1)	Caucaia
2018	Ceará (1)	Tiradentes
2019	Ceará (2)	Fortaleza
2020	Fortaleza (2)	Ceará
2021	Ceará (3)	Fortaleza
2022	Fortaleza (3)	Ceará
2023	Ceará (4)	Fortaleza
2024	Ceará (5)	Fortaleza
2025	Fortaleza (4)	Ceará

== Titles by team ==
Teams in bold stills active.

Rank	Club	Winners	Winning years
1	**Caucaia**	6	2008, 2009, 2011, 2012, 2013, 2015
2	**Ceará**	5	2018, 2019, 2021, 2023, 2024
3	**Fortaleza**	4	2010, 2020, 2022, 2025
4	**Ferroviário**	1	1983
4	Juventus	1	2014
4	**Menina Olímpica**	1	2016
4	**São Gonçalo**	1	2017

=== By city ===
City	Championships	Clubs
Fortaleza	12	Ceará (5), Fortaleza (4), Ferroviário (1), Juventus (1), Menina Olímpica (1)
Caucaia	6	Caucaia (6)
São Gonçalo do Amarante	1	São Gonçalo (1)
