= Centro de Formação de Atletas Tirol =

Brazilian association football club

Tirol
- Full name: Centro de Formação de Atletas Tirol
- Nickname: Time da Coruja (Owl's team)
- Founded: 1 November 2011; 15 years ago
- Ground: Presidente Vargas
- Capacity: 20,600
- President: Deusmar Queirós
- Head coach: Fabiano Soares
- League: Campeonato Brasileiro Série D Campeonato Cearense
- 2025: Cearense, 5th of 10
- Website: https://tirolcefat.com/
Home colours	Away colours

Centro de Formação de Atletas Tirol, generally known as Tirol or CEFAT, is a Brazilian football club from Fortaleza, Ceará. It competes in the Campeonato Cearense, the top tier of the Ceará state football league.

== History ==
After starting their first projects before their official foundation date, Tirol was founded on 1 November 2011 as Grêmio Recreativo Pague Menos, mainly as a team for the employees of the Pague Menos pharmacies in the region. The club joined the Federação Cearense de Futebol as an amateur team in 2018, later becoming a professional side in 2021 and entering the year's Campeonato Cearense Série C.

Grêmio Pague Menos achieved promotion to the Campeonato Cearense Série B in their first-ever competition, but lost the finals to Guarani de Juazeiro. In May 2022, the club changed name to Centro de Formação de Atletas Tirol.

In the 2024 Cearense Série B, Tirol managed to achieve promotion to the Campeonato Cearense after defeating Itapipoca in the semifinals. The club defeated Cariri 3–0 in the final, winning the first title of their history.

During the 2025 Cearense, the club reached the quarterfinals of the competition and qualified to the 2026 Campeonato Brasileiro Série D.

== Honours ==
=== Official tournaments ===
State
Competitions	Titles	Seasons
Campeonato Cearense Série B	1	2024

=== Runners-up ===
- Campeonato Cearense Série C (1): 2021
