= Sávio Santos =

Brazilian footballer

Personal information
- Full name: João Sávio Melo dos Santos
- Date of birth: 9 June 2000 (age 26)
- Place of birth: Fortaleza, Brazil
- Height: 1.79 m (5 ft 10 in)
- Position: Striker

Team information
- Current team: Atlético Cearense

Youth career
- 2015–2020: Grêmio

Senior career*
Years	Team	Apps	(Gls)
2020–2021	Grêmio	0	(0)
2020	→ São Bento-SP (loan)	4	(0)
2021	→ Botafogo-PB (loan)	5	(0)
2021–2022	Mineros de Zacatecas	24	(5)
2022–2023	Al-Karamah		
2023	Caucaia	2	(0)
2023–	Atlético Cearense	4	(0)
- * Club domestic league appearances and goals as of 9 July 2023

João Sávio Melo dos Santos (born 9 June 2000), commonly known as Sávio Santos, is a Brazilian professional footballer who plays as a striker for Atlético Cearense.

== Club career ==
=== Grêmio ===
Born in Fortaleza, Brazil, Sávio Santos joined the Grêmio's Academy at the age of 15 in 2015.

== Career statistics ==
=== Club ===
As of 1 June 2021.

Appearances and goals by club, season and competition
Club	Season	League			National Cup		Continental		Other		Total	
Club	Season	Division	Apps	Goals	Apps	Goals	Apps	Goals	Apps	Goals	Apps	Goals
Grêmio	2020	Série A	—		—		—		—		0	0
Grêmio	2021	Série A	—		—		—		—		0	0
Grêmio	Total		0	0	0	0	0	0	0	0	0	0
São Bento-SP (loan)	2020	Série C	2	0	—		—		2 (Note: Appearance(s) in Campeonato Paulista Série A2.)	0	2	0
São Bento-SP (loan)	Total		2	0	0	0	0	0	2	0	4	0
Botafogo-PB (loan)	2021	Série C	—		—		—		5 (Note: Appearance(s) in Copa do Nordeste.)	0	5	0
Botafogo-PB (loan)	Total		0	0	0	0	0	0	5	0	5	0
Career total			2	0	0	0	0	0	7	0	9	0
