= Denis (footballer, born 1989) =

Brazilian footballer

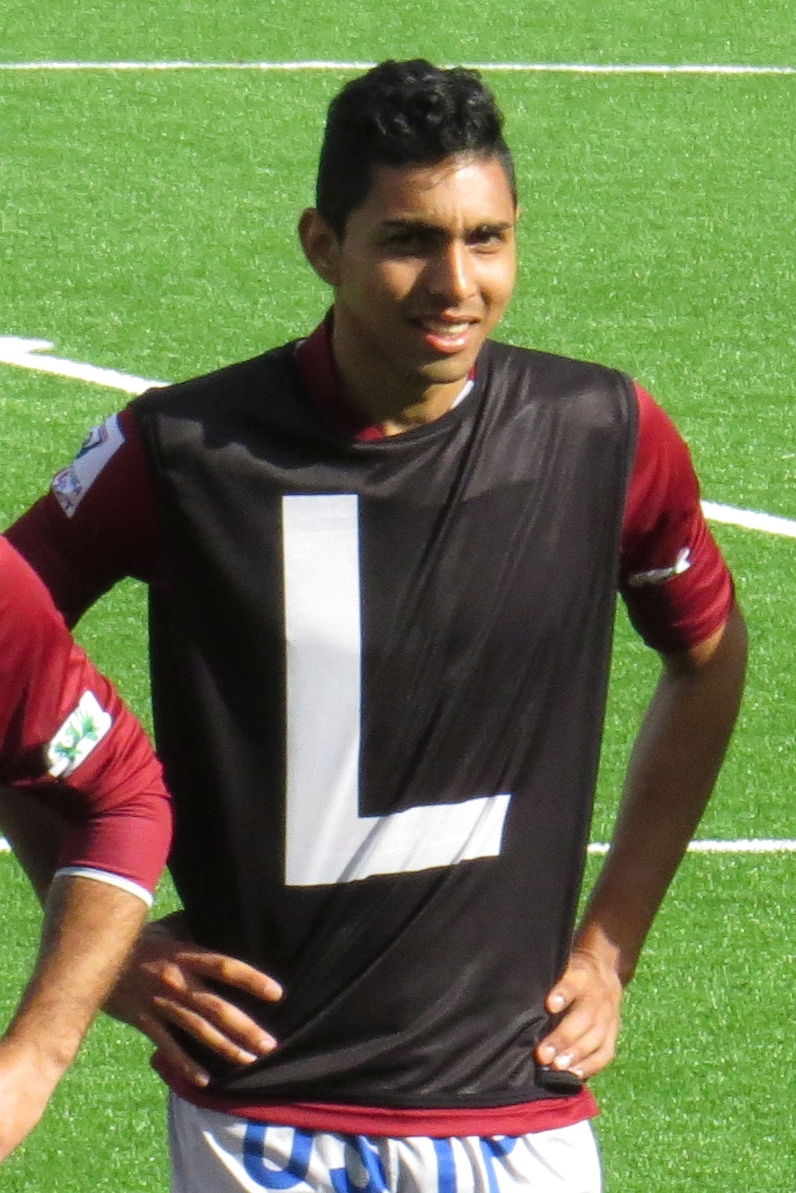
- Denis while still at Jaro, 2015

Personal information
- Full name: Denis Lima de Assis
- Date of birth: 29 December 1989 (age 36)
- Place of birth: Fortaleza, Brazil
- Height: 1.90 m (6 ft 3 in)
- Position: Forward

Team information
- Current team: Maranguape
- Number: 19

Youth career
- –2008: Aliança

Senior career*
Years	Team	Apps	(Gls)
2008	Aliança		
2009	Maguary		
2010	Pacatuba		
2011–2014	MP	75	(66)
2014–2016	Jaro	33	(5)
2016	Tiradentes	3	(0)
2016	Rio Branco		
2016–2017	Hong Kong Rangers	12	(4)
2017–2018	Lee Man	13	(4)
2018	Jaro	9	(1)
2019	MP	21	(9)
2020	Santa Lucía	3	(0)
2023–2024	Horizonte	7	(0)
2024–	Maranguape	6	(0)
- * Club domestic league appearances and goals as of 31 March 2024

Denis Lima de Assis (born 29 December 1989), simply known as Denis, is a Brazilian footballer who plays as a forward for Brazilian club Maranguape.

== Club career ==
On 30 November 2016, Rangers announced on Facebook that they had signed Denis.

On 3 July 2017, Lima moved to Lee Man following Lee & Man Paper's decision to form their own HKPL club.
