= Estádio Antônio Cruz =

Multi-use stadium in Fortaleza, Ceará, Brazil

Antônio Cruz
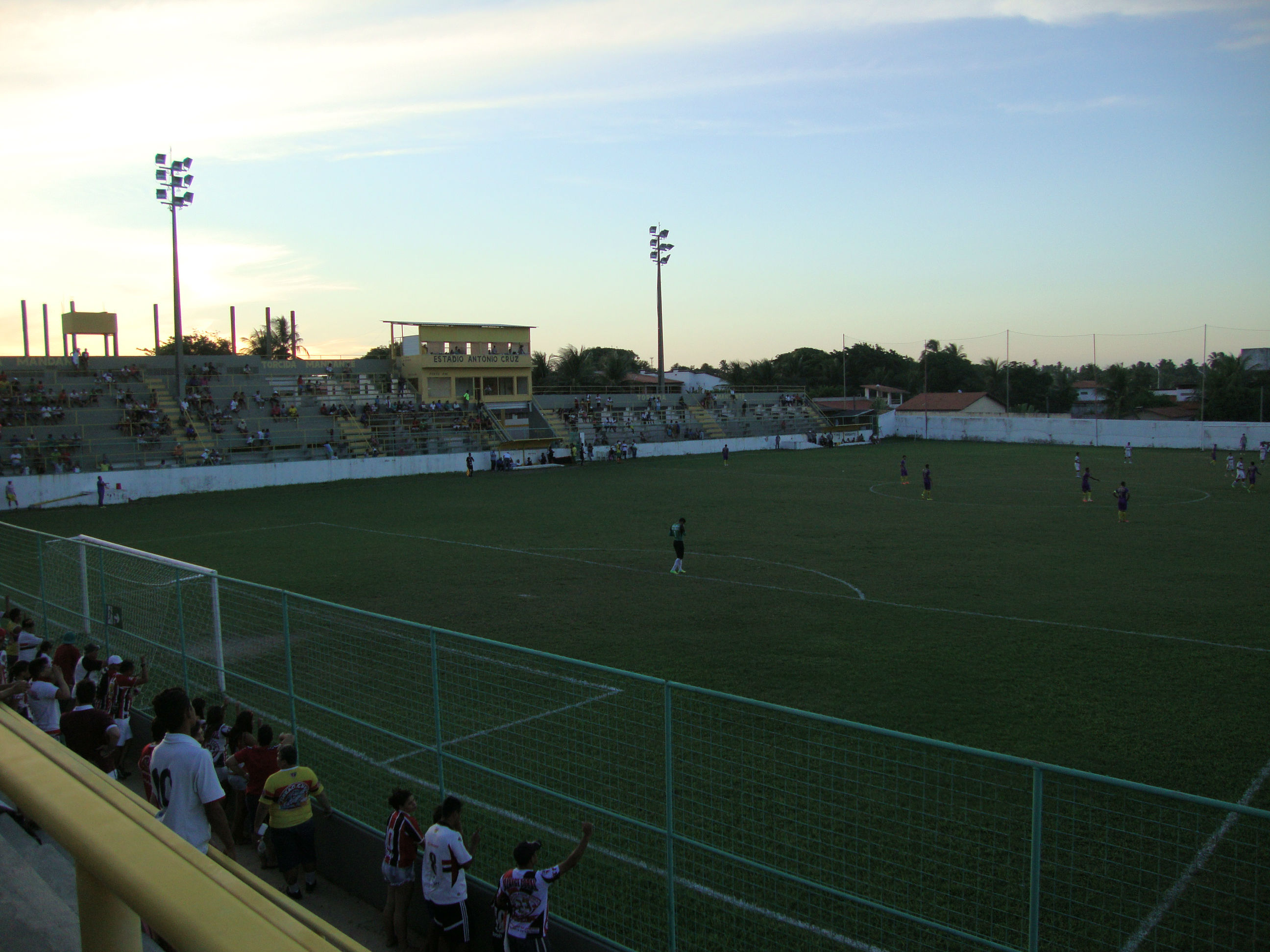
- Interactive map of Antônio Cruz
- Full name: Estádio Antônio Cruz
- Location: Fortaleza, CE, Brazil
- Coordinates: 3°49′5.65″S 38°26′56.45″W
- Owner: Atlético Cearense
- Operator: Atlético Cearense
- Capacity: 3,000
- Surface: Natural grass
- Field size: 100 × 70 m

Construction
- Renovated: 2016

Tenant
- Atlético Cearense

Estádio Antônio Cruz is a multi-use stadium in Fortaleza, Ceará, Brazil. It is used mostly for football matches, and has a maximum capacity of 3,000 people.
