= Campeonato Cearense Série C =

Football league in Ceará, Brazil

- Organising body: FCF
- Founded: 2004; 22 years ago
- Country: Brazil
- State: Ceará
- Level on pyramid: 3
- Promotion to: Série B
- Current champions: Crateus (3rd title) (2025)
- Most championships: Crateus (3 titles )
- Website: FCF Official website

The Campeonato Cearense Série C is the third tier of the professional state football league in the Brazilian state of Ceará. It is run by the Ceará Football Federation (FCF).

== List of champions ==
Season	Champions	Runners-up
2004	Crateus (1)	Trairiense
2005	São Benedito (1)	Horizonte
2006	Eusébio (1)	Caucaia
2007	Barbalha (1)	Maracanã
2008	Aracati (1)	Desportiva Tauá
2009	Caucaia (1)	Nova Russas
2010	Crateus (2)	Pacatuba
2011	Uruburetama (1)	Barbalha
2012	Iguatu (1)	Nova Russas
2013	América (1)	Barbalha
2014	Uniclinic (1)	Itapajé
2015	Alto Santo (1)	Floresta
2016	Tianguá (1)	EC Limoeiro
2017	União Brejo Santo (1)	Caucaia
2018	Campo Grande (1)	Crato
2019	Pacatuba (1)	Itapipoca
2020	Maracanã (1)	Cariri
2021	Guarani de Juazeiro (1)	Pague Menos
2022	Pacatuba (2)	Crateus
2023	Maranguape (1)	Cariri
2024	Quixadá (1)	Crato
2025	Crateus (3)	Guarany de Sobral

Name changes

- Uniclinic is the currently Atlético Cearense.
- Grêmio Recreativo Pague Menos is the currently Centro de Formação de Atletas Tirol.

== Titles by team ==
Teams in bold stills active.

Rank	Club	Winners	Winning years
1	**Crateus**	3	2004, 2010, 2025
2	**Pacatuba**	2	2019, 2022
3	**Alto Santo**	1	2015
3	**América**	1	2013
3	Aracati	1	2008
3	**Atlético Cearense**	1	2014
3	**Barbalha**	1	2007
3	**Campo Grande**	1	2018
3	**Caucaia**	1	2009
3	Eusébio	1	2006
3	**Guarani de Juazeiro**	1	2021
3	**Iguatu**	1	2012
3	**Maracanã**	1	2020
3	**Maranguape**	1	2023
3	**Quixadá**	1	2024
3	**São Benedito**	1	2005
3	Tianguá	1	2016
3	**União Brejo Santo**	1	2017
3	Uruburetama	1	2011

=== By city ===
City	Championships	Clubs
Crateus	3	Crateus (3)
Fortaleza	2	América (1), Atlético Cearense (1)
Juazeiro do Norte	2	Campo Grande (1), Guarani de Juazeiro (1)
Pacatuba	2	Pacatuba (2)
Alto Santo	1	Alto Santo (1)
Aracati	1	Aracati (1)
Barbalha	1	Barbalha (1)
Brejo Santo	1	União Brejo Santo (1)
Caucaia	1	Caucaia (1)
Eusébio	1	Eusébio (1)
Iguatu	1	Iguatu (1)
Maracanaú	1	Maracanã (1)
Maranguape	1	Maranguape (1)
Quixadá	1	Quixadá (1)
São Benedito	1	São Benedito (1)
Tianguá	1	Tianguá (1)
Uruburetama	1	Uruburetama (1)
