= Pacajus Esporte Clube =

Brazilian football club

Pacajus
- Full name: Pacajus Esporte Clube
- Nickname: Índio Paiacu do Vale do Caju
- Founded: 17 June 2017; 8 years ago
- Ground: Estádio Municipal João Ronaldo
- Capacity: 2,000
- President: Francisco Cristiano Cortez Oliveira
- Head coach: Raimundo Wágner
- 2024: Cearense Série B, 9th of 9 (relegated)
- Website: https://pacajusesporteclube.com.br/
Home colors	Away colors

Pacajus Esporte Clube, is a Brazilian professional football club based in Pacajus, Ceará.

== History ==
Founded on 17 June 2017, Pacajus affiliated themselves in the Federação Cearense de Futebol shortly after and played in the Campeonato Cearense Terceira Divisão later in the year. The club reached the semifinals and won promotion to the Segunda Divisão. After finishing fifth in the 2018 second level, the club won promotion to the Campeonato Cearense in 2019 after reaching the finals but losing the title to Caucaia.

In the 2020 Campeonato Cearense, Pacajus narrowly avoided relegation by finishing seventh. In the 2021 edition, the club finished fifth and qualified to the 2022 Série D.

== Honours ==
- Copa Fares Lopes
  - Winners (1): 2022
- Taça Padre Cícero
  - Winners (1): 2021
