= Copa Integração =

Brazilian football competition

The Copa Integração was a friendly Brazilian football competition held in the Northeast Region. Its purpose was to prepare the clubs for the following season.

== List of champions ==
Season	Champion
Season	Club	City
2005	(Pernambuco); Salgueiro	Salgueiro
2006	(Ceará); Guarani	Juazeiro do Norte
2007	(Ceará); Icasa	Juazeiro do Norte
2008	(Ceará); Icasa	Juazeiro do Norte
2009	(Ceará); Icasa	Juazeiro do Norte

=== Titles by team ===
Club	Titles
Icasa	3 (2007, 2008, 2009)
Guarani	1 (2006)
Salgueiro	1 (2005)

=== Titles by state ===
State	Titles
Ceará	4
Pernambuco	1
