= Boa Viagem, Ceará =

Municipality in Ceará, Brazil

Coordinates: 5°07′40″S 39°43′55″W

Boa Viagem
- Municipality
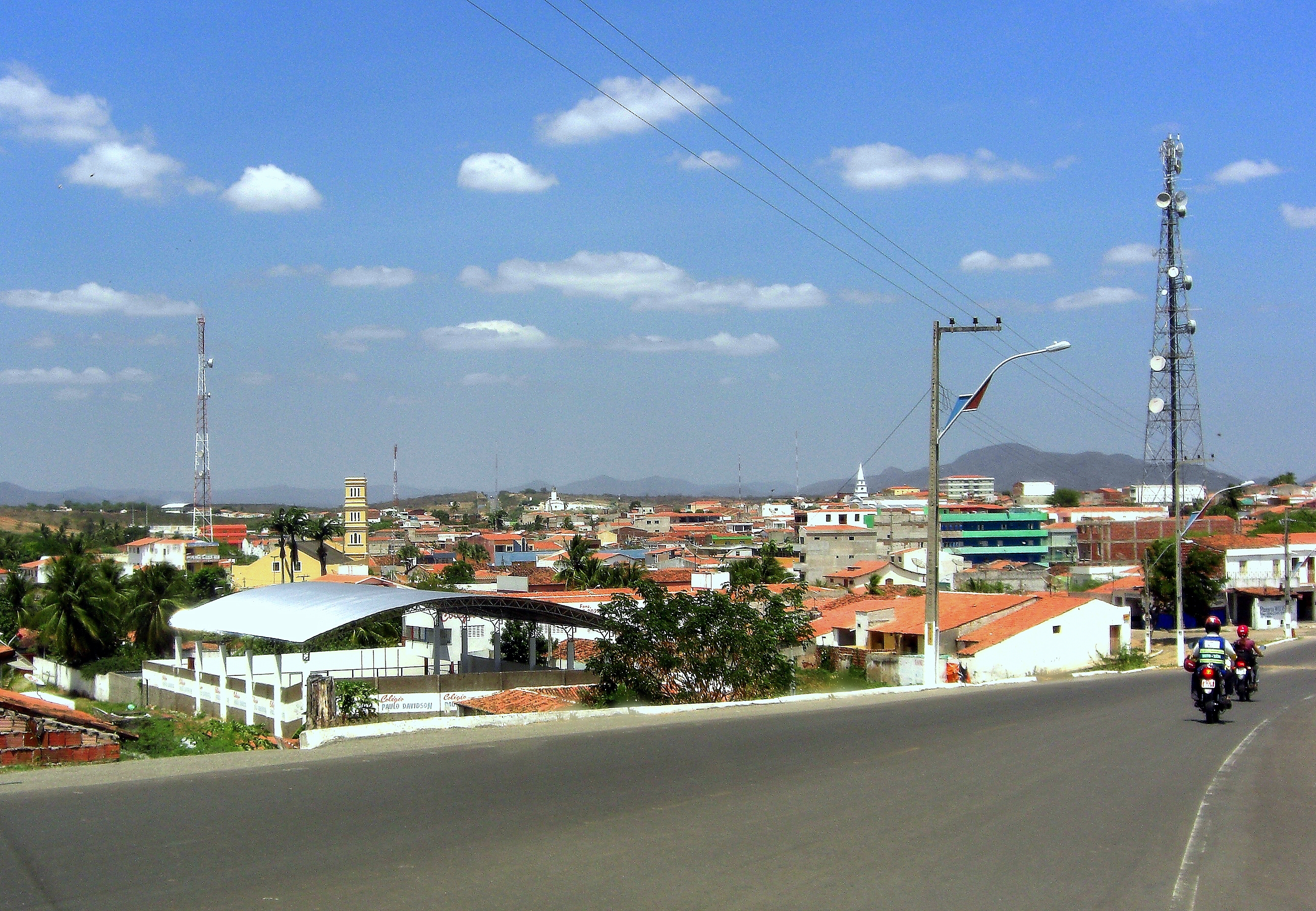

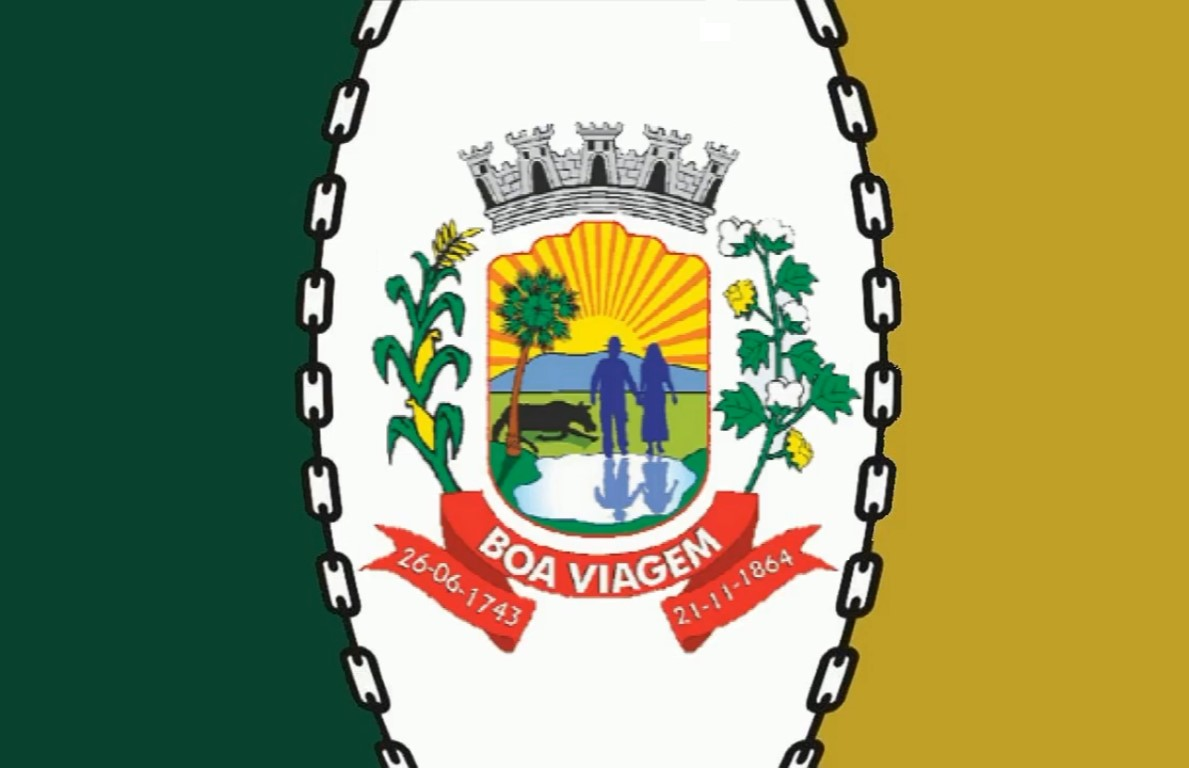
- Flag
- Interactive map of Boa Viagem
- Country: Brazil
- Region: Nordeste
- State: Ceará
- Mesoregion: Sertoes Cearenses

Population (2020)
  - Total: 54,577
- Time zone: UTC−3 (BRT)

Boa Viagem, Ceará is a municipality in the state of Ceará in the Northeast region of Brazil.

== See also ==
- List of municipalities in Ceará
