= Crateús Esporte Clube =

Crateús
- Full name: Crateús Esporte Clube
- Nicknames: Canário da Terra; Guerreiro do Poty
- Founded: February 1, 2001
- Ground: Jumelão, Crateús, Ceará state, Brazil
- Capacity: 4,000
Home colors	Away colors

Crateús Esporte Clube, commonly known as Crateús, is a Brazilian football club based in Crateús, Ceará state.

== History ==
The club was founded on February 14, 2001. They won the Campeonato Cearense Third Level in 2004 and in 2010. Crateús finished in the eleventh position in the 2012 Campeonato Cearense.

== Honours ==
- Campeonato Cearense Série C
  - Winners (3): 2004, 2010, 2025

== Stadium ==
Crateús Esporte Clube play their home games at Estádio Juvenal Melo, nicknamed Jumelão. The stadium has a maximum capacity of 4,000 people.
