= Cariús =

Municipality in Ceará, Brazil

Coordinates: 6°32′S 39°30′W

- Municipality
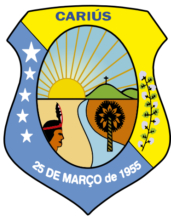
- Coat of arms
- Interactive map of Cariús
- Country: Brazil
- Region: Nordeste
- State: Ceará
- Mesoregion: Centro-Sul Cearense

Population (2020)
  - Total: 18,699
- Time zone: UTC−3 (BRT)

Cariús is a municipality in the state of Ceará in the Northeast region of Brazil.

== See also ==
- List of municipalities in Ceará
