= América Football Club (CE) =

América
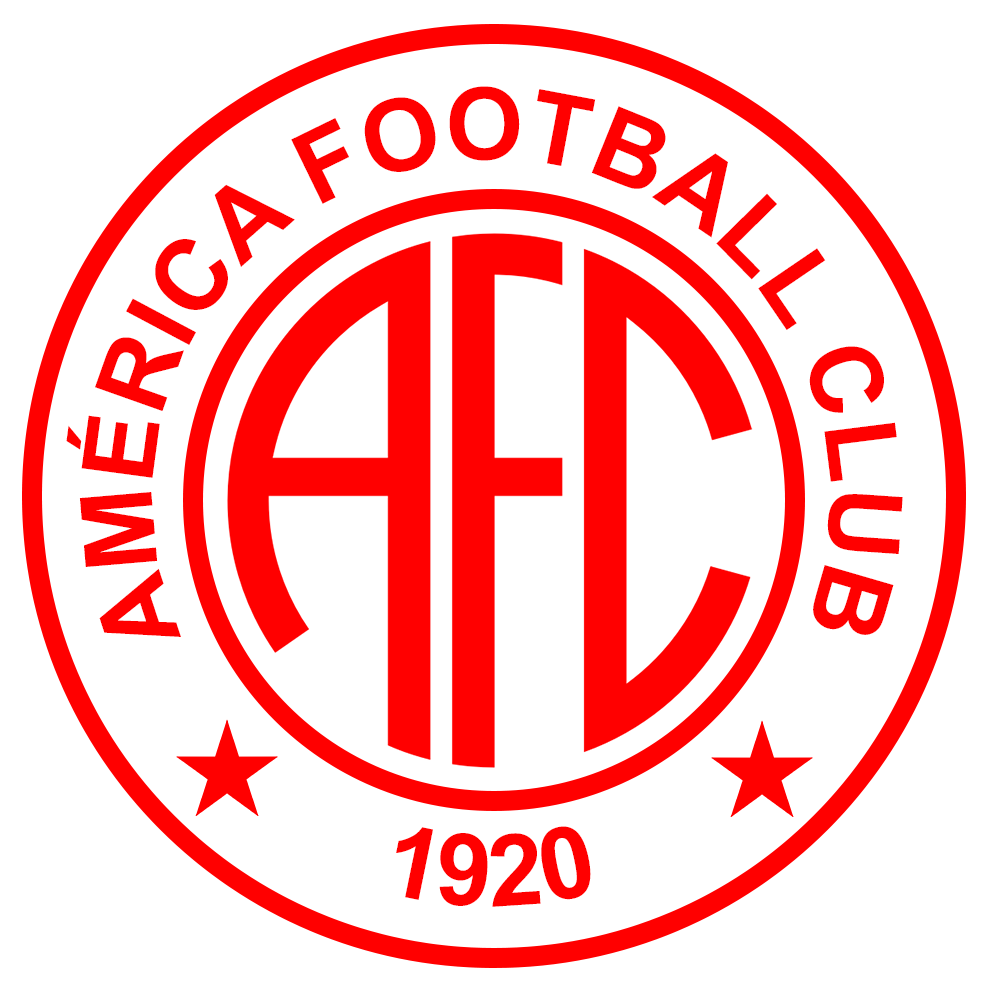
- Full name: América Football Club
- Nickname(s): Mecão
- Founded: November 11, 1920 (104 years ago)
- Ground: Estádio Presidente Vargas, Fortaleza, Ceará, Brazil
- Capacity: 23,000
Home colours	Away colours

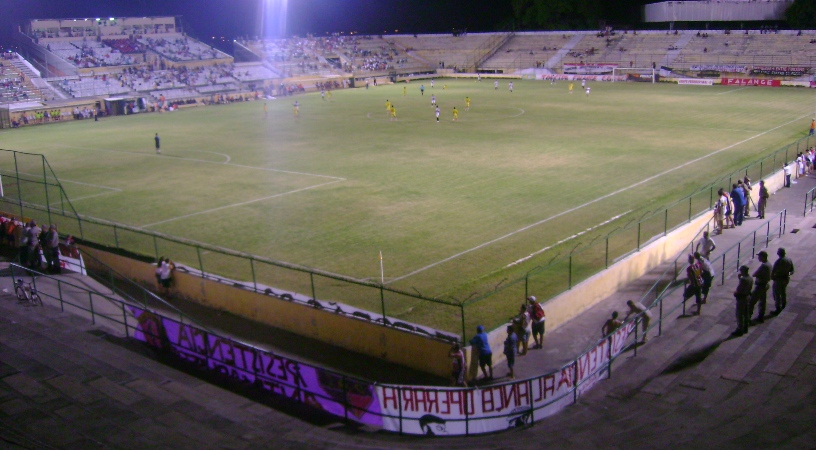
Estádio Presidente Vargas (Ceará)

América Football Club, is an association football club based in Fortaleza, the capital of the north-east Brazilian state of Ceará. The club was founded on November 11, 1920, and plays home games at Estádio Presidente Vargas, which has a maximum capacity of 23,000 people. América's mascot used to be a devil, but it was replaced with an eagle in the early 1990s. The club is primarily of historic importance in its home state.

Greatest achievements were the Championships of the State of Ceará of 1935 and 1966. In the years 1933, 1934, 1940, 1943, 1948 and 1954 América was runner up of the competition. In 1967 América qualified as state champion of 1966 for participation in the Taça Brasil, the national championship competition of those days. América won there the Grupo Norte da Zona Norte da Taça Brasil, winning both finals against the Champion of Pará, Paysandu SC from Belém, 1–0. In October 1967 a crowd of 40,000 witnessed when América was eliminated from the competition after a 0–1 home defeat against Náutico from Recife.

After the state championship in 1935 América, alongside Flamengo, SC Argentino and Duque de Caxias, broke away from the league to establish, without lasting success, an alternative association. América returned to the fold in 1938. Between 1921 and 1997 América played 64 seasons in the first state division. After 1997 the club played for seven years in the second division before being relegated to the third level where it also suffered a few relegations. A first place in 2013 afforded it a return to the second division in 2014.

A formative figure in the history of the club was the journalist and radio broadcaster Alberto Damasceno, who was president of the club for 23 years before he passed on the office to his son Gian Paolo Damasceno in the mid of the first decade of the 2000s.

The most remarkable player in the history of the club was José Ribamar de Oliveira "Canhoteiro", sometimes considered the left wing pendant to Garrincha. He played for América from 1949 until his move to São Paulo FC in 1953.

== Honours ==
- Campeonato Cearense
  - Winners (2): 1935, 1966
  - Runners-up (4): 1923, 1934, 1948, 1954
- Campeonato Cearense Série C
  - Winners (1): 2013
- Torneio Início do Ceará
  - Winners (6): 1924, 1950, 1956, 1957, 1963, 1970

== Other modalities ==
The basketball team of the club dominated in Ceará during the 1960s and won the state championships of 1962, 1963, 1964, 1966 and 1967.

The futsal team was similarly dominant and won altogether eight state championships in the years 1957, 1958, 1964, 1965, 1966, 1967, 1968 and 1969.
