= Federação Cearense de Futebol =

Brazilian football state federation

- Formation: 23 March 1920; 106 years ago
- Type: List of international sport federations
- Headquarters: Fortaleza, Ceará, Brazil
- Official language: Portuguese
- President: Mauro Carmélio
- Website: futebolcearense.com.br

The Federação Cearense de Futebol (English: Football Association of Ceará state) was founded on March 23, 1920, and it manages all the official football tournaments within the state of Ceará, which are the Campeonato Cearense and the Campeonato Cearense lower levels, and represents the clubs at the Brazilian Football Confederation (CBF).

== Current clubs in Brasileirão ==
As of 2023 season.

Club	City
Série A
Fortaleza	Fortaleza
Série B
Ceará	Fortaleza
Série C
Floresta	Fortaleza
Série D
Atlético Cearense	Fortaleza
Caucaia	Caucaia
Ferrovário	Fortaleza
Iguatu	Iguatu
Pacajus	Pacajus
