= Boa Viagem Esporte Clube =

Boa Viagem
- Full name: Boa Viagem Esporte Clube
- Nickname(s): Galo do Sertão Central
- Founded: December 22, 1999
- Ground: Serjão, Boa Viagem, Ceará state, Brazil
- Capacity: 5,000
Home colours	Away colours

Boa Viagem Esporte Clube, commonly known as Boa Viagem, is a Brazilian football club based in Boa Viagem, Ceará state.

== History ==
The club was founded on December 22, 1999. They finished in the second position in the Campeonato Cearense Second Level in 2000, when they lost the competition to Itapajé, and in 2007, when they lost the competition to Horizonte.

== Stadium ==
Boa Viagem Esporte Clube play their home games at Estádio Municipal Segismundo Rodrigues Neto, nicknamed Serjão. The stadium has a maximum capacity of 5,000 people.
