= Campeonato Cearense Série B =

Football league in Ceará, Brazil

- Organising body: FCF
- Founded: 1966; 60 years ago
- Country: Brazil
- State: Ceará
- Level on pyramid: 2
- Promotion to: Campeonato Cearense
- Relegation to: Série C
- Current champions: Itapipoca (3rd title) (2026)
- Most championships: Guarany de Sobral (4 titles)
- Website: FCF Official website

The Campeonato Cearense Série B is the second tier of the professional state football league in the Brazilian state of Ceará. It is run by the Ceará Football Federation (FCF).

== List of champions ==
Season	Champions	Runners-up
1966	Guarany de Sobral (1)	Quixadá
1967	Quixadá (1)	Messejana
1968	Tiradentes (1)	Riachuelo
1969	Olavo Bilac (1)	Messejana
1971–1993	Not held	
1994	EC Limoeiro (1)	Uruburetama
1995–1997	Not held	
1998	Uniclinic (1)	Itapipoca
1999	Guarany de Sobral (2)	Crato
2000	Itapajé (1)	Boa Viagem
2001	AD Limoeiro (1)	Maranguape
2002	Itapipoca (1)	Quixadá
2003	Icasa (1)	Uniclinic
2004	Guarani de Juazeiro (1)	Tiradentes
2005	Guarany de Sobral (3)	Maranguape
2006	Guarani de Juazeiro (2)	Itapajé
2007	Horizonte (1)	Boa Viagem
2008	Guarany de Sobral (4)	Maranguape
2009	AD Limoeiro (2)	Crato
2010	Icasa (2)	Tiradentes
2011	Trairiense (1)	Crateus
2012	Maracanã (1)	São Benedito
2013	Itapipoca (2)	Quixadá
2014	São Benedito (1)	Maranguape
2015	Tiradentes (2)	Uniclinic
2016	Alto Santo (1)	Horizonte
2017	Iguatu (1)	Floresta
2018	Barbalha (1)	Guarany de Sobral
2019	Caucaia (1)	Pacajus
2020	Icasa (3)	Crato
2021	Maracanã (2)	Iguatu
2022	Guarani de Juazeiro (3)	Barbalha
2023	Horizonte (2)	Floresta
2024	Tirol (1)	Cariri
2025	Maranguape (1)	Quixadá

Name changes

- Uniclinic is the currently Atlético Cearense.
- Grêmio Recreativo Pague Menos is the currently Centro de Formação de Atletas Tirol.

== Titles by team ==
Teams in bold stills active.

Rank	Club	Winners	Winning years
1	**Guarany de Sobral**	4	1967, 1999, 2005, 2008
2	**Icasa**	3	2003, 2010, 2020
2	**Guarani de Juazeiro**	3	2004, 2006, 2022
4	AD Limoeiro	2	2001, 2009
4	**Horizonte**	2	2007, 2023
4	**Itapipoca**	2	2002, 2013
4	**Maracanã**	2	2012, 2021
4	**Tiradentes**	2	1969, 2015
9	**Alto Santo**	1	2016
9	**Atlético Cearense**	1	1998
9	**Barbalha**	1	2018
9	**Caucaia**	1	2019
9	**Iguatu**	1	2017
9	**Itapajé**	1	2000
9	**EC Limoeiro**	1	1994
9	**Maranguape**	1	2025
9	Olavo Bilac	1	1970
9	**Quixadá**	1	1968
9	**São Benedito**	1	2014
9	**Tirol**	1	2024
9	**Trairiense**	1	2011

=== By city ===
City	Championships	Clubs
Juazeiro do Norte	6	Icasa (3), Guarani de Juazeiro (3)
Fortaleza	5	Tiradentes (2), Atlético Cearense (1), Olavo Bilac (1), Tirol (1)
Sobral	4	Guarany de Sobral (4)
Limoeiro do Norte	3	AD Limoeiro (2), EC Limoeiro (1)
Horizonte	2	Horizonte (2)
Itapipoca	2	Itapipoca (2)
Maracanaú	2	Maracanã (2)
Alto Santo	1	Alto Santo (1)
Barbalha	1	Barbalha (1)
Caucaia	1	Caucaia (1)
Iguatu	1	Iguatu (1)
Itapajé	1	Itapajé (1)
Maranguape	1	Maranguape (1)
Quixadá	1	Quixadá (1)
São Benedito	1	São Benedito (1)
Trairi	1	Trairiense (1)
