= Associação Desportiva Iguatu =

Iguatu
- Full name: Associação Desportiva Iguatu
- Nickname: Azulão
- Founded: 11 March 2010; 16 years ago
- Ground: Morenão
- Capacity: 3,600
- President: Antônio Filho
- Head Coach: Flávio Araújo
- League: Campeonato Brasileiro Série D Campeonato Cearense
- 2025 2025: Série D, 36th of 64; Cearense, 8 of 10
Home colours	Away colours

Associação Desportiva Iguatu, commonly known as Iguatu, is a Brazilian football club based in Iguatu, Ceará state, which currently compete in the Campeonato Brasileiro Série D, the fourth division of Brazilian football, as well as the Campeonato Cearense, the top tier of the Ceará state league.

== History ==
Founded on 11 March 2010, Iguatu intended to register the club in the year's Campeonato Cearense Série C, but only started playing professionally in 2012. They won the third division in their first professional year, achieving promotion to the Campeonato Cearense Série B, where they remained for two years before suffering relegation.

Iguatu only returned to the second division of the Cearense in 2015, after finishing third in the Série C. In 2017, the club achieved a first-ever promotion to the Campeonato Cearense, after winning the second division.

After a fifth position in the 2018 Cearense, Iguatu suffered relegation in 2019, after finishing ninth. After two seasons in the second division, the club returned to the top tier in 2021, despite losing the finals to Maracanã.

In the 2022 Cearense, Iguatu reached the semifinals of the competition, knocking out Ceará in the quarterfinals but being knocked out by Caucaia. By finishing fourth, the club also assured a spot in the 2023 Série D.

== Honours ==
- Copa Fares Lopes
  - Winners (1): 2023
- Campeonato Cearense Série B
  - Winners (1): 2018
- Campeonato Cearense Série C
  - Winners (1): 2012
- Taça Padre Cícero
  - Winners (3): 2018, 2023, 2026
