= Maranguape Futebol Clube =

Maranguape
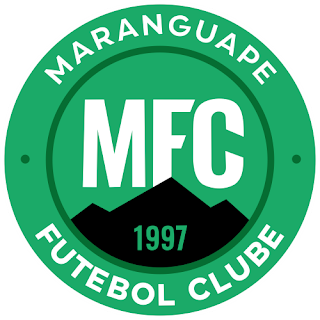
- Full name: Maranguape Futebol Clube
- Nicknames: Gavião da Serra; Clube Serrano; Verdão; Alviverde
- Founded: November 17, 1997
- Ground: Moraisão, Maranguape, Ceará state, Brazil
- Capacity: 5,000
Home colours	Away colours	colours

Maranguape Futebol Clube, commonly known as Maranguape, is a Brazilian football club based in Maranguape, Ceará state.

== History ==
The club was founded on November 17, 1997. They competed for the first time in the Campeonato Cearense in 2002, when they finished in the third position.

== Stadium ==
Maranguape Futebol Clube play their home games at Estádio Francisco Cardoso de Moraes, nicknamed Moraisão. The stadium has a maximum capacity of 5,000 people.

== Honours ==
- Campeonato Cearense Série B
  - Winners (1): 2025
- Campeonato Cearense Série C
  - Winners (1): 2023
