= Estádio Mauro Sampaio =

Stadium in Juazeiro do Norte, Brazil

Coordinates: 7.2242°S 39.3178°W

- Arena Romeirão
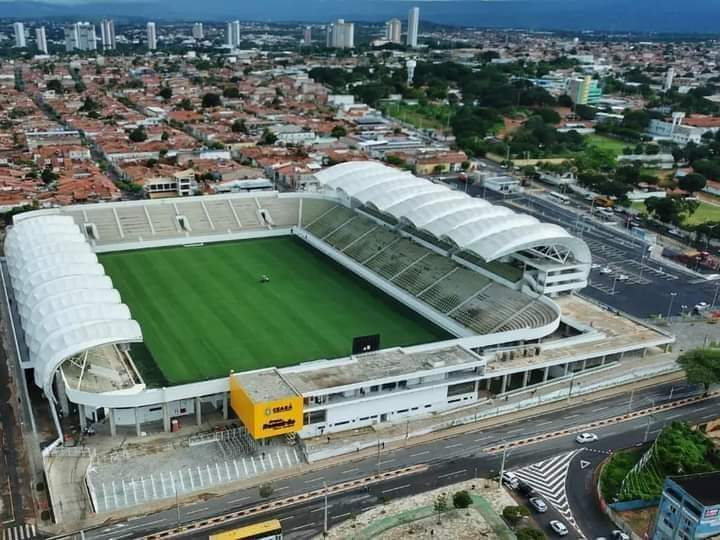
- Interactive map of Estádio Mauro Sampaio
- Full name: Estádio Mauro Sampaio
- Location: Juazeiro do Norte, Ceará, Brazil
- Capacity: 17000
- Surface: Grass

Construction
- Opened: May 1, 1970

Tenant
- Icasa

Estádio Mauro Sampaio, also known as Arena Romeirão, is a stadium in Juazeiro do Norte, Brazil. It is the home of Icasa soccer team.

Covering an area of 45,451 square meters, Arena Romeirão is equipped with a grass field that meets the standards of the Fédération Internationale de Football Association (FIFA), a football museum area, bleachers with a capacity of 17,000 seats, two team bench areas, press boxes and VIP suites, six locker rooms (four for teams and coaches, and two for referees and ball boys), two parking areas, a snack bar, and a medical facility.
