= Copa Fares Lopes =

- Founded: 2010
- Region: Ceará
- Current champions: Maracanã (1st title)
- Most championships: Ferroviário (3 titles)
- 2026

The Copa Fares Lopes, is a tournament organized by Federação Cearense de Futebol every second half of the season. Its name is a homage to Fares Cândido Lopes (1934–2004), president of the Federation from 1993 to his death.

The champions qualify for the Copa do Brasil first stage.

== List of champions ==
Following is the list with champions:

Season	Champions	Runners-up
2010	Horizonte (1)	Icasa
2011	Horizonte (2)	Guarani de Juazeiro
2012	Guarani de Juazeiro (1)	Horizonte
2013	Barbalha (1)	Guarany de Sobral
2014	Icasa (1)	Tiradentes
2015	Guarany de Sobral (1)	Guarani de Juazeiro
2016	Guarani de Juazeiro (2)	Horizonte
2017	Floresta (1)	Fortaleza
2018	Ferroviário (1)	Caucaia
2019	Caucaia (1)	Atlético Cearense
2020	Ferroviário (2)	Icasa
2021	Icasa (2)	Caucaia
2022	Pacajus (1)	Guarany de Sobral
2023	Iguatu (1)	Ferroviário
2024	Ferroviário (3)	Floresta
2025	Maracanã (1)	Tirol

== Titles by team ==
Teams in bold stills active.

Rank	Club	Winners	Winning years
1	Ferroviário	3	2018, 2020, 2024
2	Guarani de Juazeiro	2	2012, 2016
2	Horizonte	2	2010, 2011
2	Icasa	2	2014, 2021
8	Barbalha	1	2013
8	Caucaia	1	2019
8	Floresta	1	2017
8	Guarany de Sobral	1	2015
8	Iguatu	1	2023
8	Maracanã	1	2025
8	Pacajus	1	2022

=== By city ===
City	Championships	Clubs
Juazeiro do Norte	4	Icasa (2), Guarani de Juazeiro (2)
Fortaleza	4	Ferroviário (3), Floresta (1)
Horizonte	2	Horizonte (2)
Barbalha	1	Barbalha (1)
Caucaia	1	Caucaia (1)
Iguatu	1	Iguatu (1)
Maracanaú	1	Maracanã (1)
Pacajus	1	Pacajus (1)
Sobral	1	Guarany de Sobral (1)
