= Caucaia Esporte Clube =

Caucaia
- Full name: Caucaia Esporte Clube
- Nicknames: Raposa Metropolitana (Metropolitan Fox); Tricolor Metropolitano (Metropolitan Tricolor)
- Founded: 16 April 2004; 21 years ago
- Ground: Raimundão
- Capacity: 3,000
- Head Coach: Leandro Flávio
- League: Campeonato Cearense Série B
- 2025: Cearense, 5th of 10
Home colours	Away colours

Caucaia Esporte Clube, commonly known as Caucaia, is a Brazilian men's and women's football club based in Caucaia, Ceará state. The women's team competed twice in the Copa do Brasil de Futebol Feminino.

== History ==
The club was founded on 25 November 2001.

=== Men's team ===
They won the Campeonato Cearense Third Level in 2009.

=== Women's team ===
Caucaia competed for the first time in the Copa do Brasil de Futebol Feminino in 2008, when they were eliminated in the first round by Tiradentes. They competed again in 2009, when they were eliminated in the quarterfinals by São Francisco.

== Honours ==
=== State ===
- Campeonato Cearense
  - Runner-up (1): 2022
- Copa Fares Lopes
  - Winners (1): 2019
- Campeonato Cearense Série C
  - Winners (1): 2009
- Taça Padre Cícero
  - Winners (1): 2022

=== Women's Football ===
- Campeonato Cearense de Futebol Feminino
  - Winners (6): 2008, 2009, 2011, 2012, 2013, 2015

== Stadium ==
Caucaia Esporte Clube play their home games at Estádio Raimundo de Oliveira Filho, nicknamed Raimundão. The stadium has a maximum capacity of 3,000 people.
