= Crato Esporte Clube =

Crato
- Full name: Crato Esporte Clube
- Nicknames: Azulão da Princesa; Azulão do Cariri
- Founded: November 11, 1997
- Ground: Mirandão
- Capacity: 10,000
- League: Campeonato Cearense Série B
- 2025: Cearense Série B, 4th of 10
| Home colours | Away colours |

Crato Esporte Clube is a Brazilian professional football club based in Crato, Ceará. It competes in the Série D, the fourth tier of Brazilian football, as well as in the Campeonato Cearense, the top flight of the Ceará state football league.

== History ==
The club was founded on November 11, 1997. They finished in the second position in the Campeonato Cearense Second Level in 1999, when they lost the competition to Guarany, and in 2009, when they lost the competition to Limoeiro.

== Stadium ==
Crato Esporte Clube play their home games at Estádio Municipal Governador Virgílio Távora, nicknamed Mirandão. The stadium has a maximum capacity of 10,000 people.
