= Quixadá Futebol Clube =

Quixadá
- Full name: Quixadá Futebol Clube
- Nicknames: Canarinho do Sertão; Quixinha
- Founded: 27 December 1965; 59 years ago
- Ground: Abilhão, Quixadá, Ceará state, Brazil
- Capacity: 5,000
Home colours	Away colours

Quixadá Futebol Clube, commonly known as Quixadá, is a Brazilian football club based in Quixadá, Ceará state. They competed in the Série C once.

== History ==
The club was founded on September October 27, 1965. They won the Campeonato Cearense Second Level in 1967. Quixadá competed in the Série C in 1997, when they were eliminated in the Second Stage of the competition.

== Honours ==
- Campeonato Cearense Série B
  - Winners (1): 1967
- Campeonato Cearense Série C
  - Winners (1): 2024

== Stadium ==
Quixadá Futebol Clube play their home games at Estádio José Antônio Abílio de Lima, nicknamed Abilhão and Estádio dos Imigrantes. The stadium has a maximum capacity of 5,000 people.
