= Itapipoca Esporte Clube =

Itapipoca
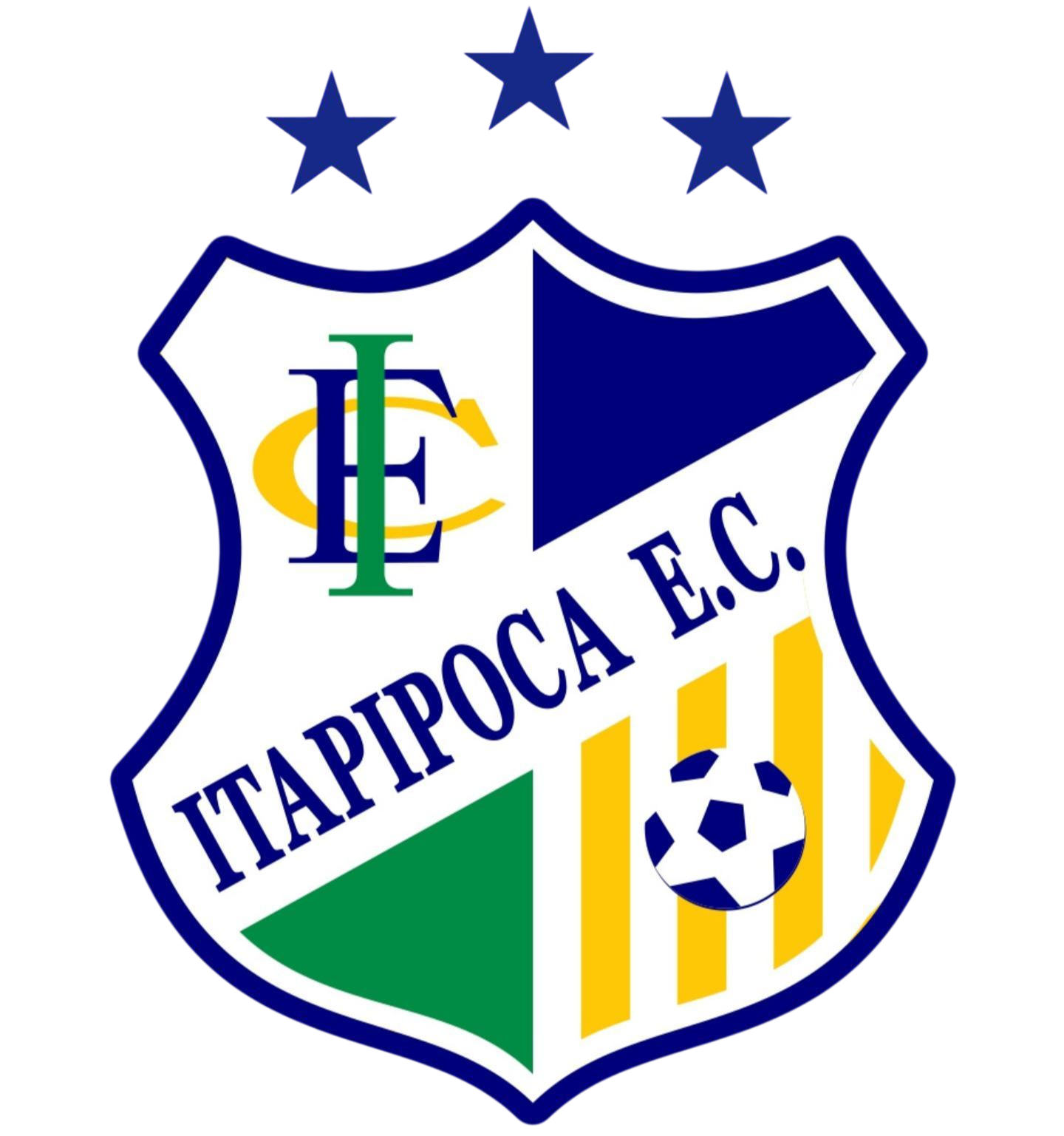
- Full name: Itapipoca Esporte Clube
- Nicknames: Garoto Travesso dos Três Climas; Ita
- Founded: December 20, 1993 (32 years ago)
- Ground: Perilão, Itapipoca, Ceará state, Brazil
- Capacity: 8,000
Home colors	Away colors	Third colors

Itapipoca Esporte Clube, commonly known as Itapipoca, is a Brazilian football club based in Itapipoca, Ceará state. They competed once in the Série C.

== History ==
The club was founded on December 20, 1993. Itapipoca won the Campeonato Cearense Second Level in 2002. They competed in the Série C in 2007, when they were eliminated in the First Stage of the competition.

== Honours ==
- Campeonato Cearense Série B:
  - Winners (3): 2002, 2013, 2026

== Stadium ==
Itapipoca Esporte Clube play their home games at Estádio Municipal Perilo Teixeira, nicknamed Perilão. The stadium has a maximum capacity of 8,000 people.
