= Guarani Esporte Clube (CE) =

Brazilian football club

Guarani de Juazeiro
- Full name: Guarani Esporte Clube
- Nicknames: Leão do Mercado; Guaraju; Rubro Negro
- Founded: April 10, 1941 (85 years ago)
- Ground: Romeirão, Juazeiro do Norte, Ceará state, Brazil
- Capacity: 16,000
- President: José Moura Vieira
- Head coach: Washington Luís
- League: Campeonato Cearense Série B
- 2025: Cearense Série B, 6th of 10
Home colors	Away colors

Guarani Esporte Clube, commonly known as Guarani de Juazeiro, is a Brazilian football club based in Juazeiro do Norte, Ceará state. They won the Copa Integração once and compete in the second division of Ceará's state championship.

== History ==
The club was founded on April 10, 1941. Guarani de Juazeiro won the Campeonato Cearense Second Level in 2004, and in 2006. They won the Copa Integração in 2006. Guarani competed in the Série D in 2011, when they were eliminated in the First Stage, after finishing in the third position in their group.

== Honours ==
=== State ===
- Campeonato Cearense
  - Runners-up (1): 2011
- Copa Fares Lopes
  - Winners (2): 2012, 2016
- Campeonato Cearense Série B
  - Winners (3): 2004, 2006, 2022
- Campeonato Cearense Série C
  - Winners (1): 2021
- Taça Padre Cícero
  - Winners (3): 2011, 2016, 2017

=== City ===
- Campeonato Citadino de Juazeiro do Norte
  - Winners (8): 1941, 1942, 1943, 1960, 1961, 1962, 1964, 1980

=== Friendly tournaments ===
- Copa Integração
  - Winners (1): 2006

== Stadium ==
Guarani Esporte Clube play their home games at Estádio Mauro Sampaio, nicknamed Romeirão. The stadium has a maximum capacity of 16,000 people.
