= Associação Desportiva Recreativa e Cultural Icasa =

Association football club in Brazil

Icasa
- Full name: Associação Desportiva Recreativa e Cultural Icasa
- Nickname: Verdão do Cariri (Cariri's Big Green)
- Founded: 5 January 1963; 63 years ago (as Icasa Esporte Clube)
- Ground: Mauro Sampaio
- Capacity: 20,000
- Chairman: Francisco Paz de Lira
- Manager: Flávio Araújo
- League: Campeonato Cearense Série B
- 2025: Cearense Série B, 7th of 10
- Website: www.icasafc.com
Home colors	Away colors

Associação Desportiva Recreativa e Cultural Icasa, or simply Icasa, is a Brazilian professional football club based in Juazeiro do Norte, Ceará. It competes in the Campeonato Cearense Série B, the second division of the Ceará state football league.

The club competed several times in the Campeonato Brasileiro Série C and returning after be relegated from Campeonato Brasileiro Série B in 2011.

== History ==
The club was founded on May 1, 1963 by Doro Germano, and José Feijó de Sá, as Icasa Esporte Clube. The club's founders were the owners of Indústria Cearense de Algodão S.A (Ceará Cotton Industry), shortened as ICASA, hence the club's name.

Icasa competed in the Campeonato Brasileiro Série C in 1981, 1995 and in 1998, being eliminated in the first stage in 1981, in the second stage in 1995, and in the first stage in 1998. In 1985, Icasa competed in the Série B, where they were eliminated in the first stage. In 1992, Icasa won the Campeonato Cearense, sharing the title with Fortaleza, Ceará, and Tiradentes, as the competition was not concluded due to a judicial dispute.

In 1998, the club was founded again as Juazeiro Empreendimentos to avoid paying a labor debt for a former club's player. After the debt was paid with the help of the club's supporters, on January 7, 2002, Juazeiro was refounded as Associação Desportiva Recreativa Cultural Icasa. In 2003, the club won the Campeonato Cearense Second Level. Icasa competed again in the Série C in 2005, where they were eliminated in the second stage, in 2006, again Icasa was eliminated in the second stage, in 2007, the club was eliminated in the first stage. Icasa competed in the 2008 Série C, where they were eliminated in the second stage, but as one of the four best clubs eliminated in that stage, Icasa qualified to compete in the following season's Série C. In 2009, the club was promoted to Série B. They won the Copa Integração in 2007, 2008, and in 2009.

== Stadium ==
The club usually plays its home games at Estádio Municipal Mauro Sampaio, usually known as Romeirão, which is a stadium located in Juazeiro do Norte, and it has a maximum capacity of 20,000 people.

== Honours ==
=== Official tournaments ===
State
Competitions	Titles	Seasons
Campeonato Cearense	1	1992
Copa Fares Lopes	2	2014, 2021
Campeonato Cearense Série B	3	2003, 2010, 2020

=== Others tournaments ===
==== Inter-state ====
- Torneio Paraíba-Ceará (1): 1972
- Copa Integração (3): 2007, 2008, 2009

==== State ====
- Taça Padre Cícero (2): 2014, 2015

==== City ====
- Campeonato Citadino de Juazeiro do Norte (8): 1965, 1966, 1967, 1968, 1969, 1970, 1971, 1972

=== Runners-up ===
- Campeonato Brasileiro Série C (1): 2012
- Campeonato Cearense (5): 1993, 1995, 2005, 2007, 2008
- Copa Fares Lopes (2): 2010, 2020

== Head coaches ==
- (Brazil) Charles Fabian (2008)
- (Brazil) Freitas Nascimento (2011)
- (Brazil) Dado Cavalcanti (2011)
- (Brazil) Márcio Bittencourt (2011)
- (Brazil) Arnaldo Lira (2011)
- (Brazil) Tarcísio Pugliese (2012)
- (Brazil) José Carlos Serrão (2012)
- (Brazil) Francisco Diá (2012–2013)
- (Brazil) Sidney Moraes (2013)
- (Brazil) Roni Araújo (2014)
- (Brazil) Tarcísio Pugliese (2014)
- (Brazil) Leandro Sena (2014)
- (Brazil) Vladimir de Jesus (2014)
- (Brazil) Tarcísio Pugliese (2014–)
