= FC Atlético Cearense =

Atlético Cearense
- Full name: Futebol Clube Atlético Cearense
- Nickname: Águia da Precabura (Eagle of the Precabura)
- Founded: 7 March 1997; 29 years ago
- Ground: Domingão
- Capacity: 10,500
- President: Maria José Vieira
- Head Coach: Raimundo Wágner
- League: Campeonato Brasileiro Série D Campeonato Cearense Série B
- 2025: Cearense Série B, 8th of 10
Home colours	Away colours

Futebol Clube Atlético Cearense, commonly known as Atlético Cearense, is a Brazilian football club based in Fortaleza, Ceará state. The club was formerly known as Uniclinic Atlético Clube and Centro de Treinamento Uniclinic.

== History ==
The club was founded on 7 March 1997 as Centro de Treinamento Uniclinic, and played their first senior tournament took place in 1998, as they featured and won the Campeonato Cearense Second Level. In 2002, after finishing ninth in the year's Campeonato Cearense, Uniclinic suffered relegation.

The club returned to the top tier in 2004, after finishing second in the 2003 Second Division. In 2008, they were renamed to Uniclinic Atlético Clube, and once again suffered relegation in the Cearense. The club spent the next five seasons in the second level, suffering relegation to the Campeonato Cearense Third Level in 2013.

Uniclinic won the third division in 2014, and achieved a second consecutive promotion in 2015 after finishing second in the second level. In 2016, the club reached the finals of the Cearense, but lost the title to Fortaleza; later in the year, the club debuted in a national competition after featuring in the Série D.

During the 2017 campaign, Uniclinic made their debut in the Copa do Brasil and in the Copa do Nordeste, being knocked out in the first stage of both tournaments. On 21 September 2018, the club was renamed to Futebol Clube Atlético Cearense.

On 17 October 2021, Atlético Cearense achieved promotion to the Série C for the first time in their history, after a 4–3 penalty win over Ferroviária.

== Honours ==
- Campeonato Cearense
  - Runners-up (1): 2016
- Campeonato Cearense Série B
  - Winners (1): 1998
- Campeonato Cearense Série C
  - Winners (1): 2014

== Stadium ==
Atlético Cearense is the owner of Estádio Antônio Cruz, which has a capacity of 3,000 people. The club often play their most important home games at Estádio Presidente Vargas, which has a maximum capacity of 20,262 people.
