= Campeonato Cearense =

Football league in Ceará, Brazil

- Organising body: FCF
- Founded: 1915; 111 years ago
- Country: Brazil
- State: Ceará
- Level on pyramid: 1
- Relegation to: Série B
- Domestic cup: Copa do Brasil
- Current champions: Fortaleza (47th title) (2026)
- Most championships: Ceará and Fortaleza (47 titles)
- Website: FCF Official website
- Current: 2026 Campeonato Cearense

The Campeonato Cearense is the professional state football league in the Brazilian state of Ceará. It is run by the Ceará Football Federation (FCF).

In over a hundred years of competition, only 11 clubs have won the title.

== List of champions ==
| Season | Champions | Runners-up |
|---|---|---|
| 1915 | Ceará (1) | Stella |
| 1916 | Ceará (2) | Maranguape |
| 1917 | Ceará (3) | Stella |
| 1918 | Ceará (4) | Fortaleza |
| 1919 | Ceará (5) | Fortaleza |
| 1920 | Fortaleza (1) | Guarany |
| 1921 | Fortaleza (2) | Guarany |
| 1922 | Ceará (6) | Fortaleza |
| 1923 | Fortaleza (3) | América |
| 1924 | Fortaleza (4) | Ceará |
| 1925 | Ceará (7) | Fortaleza |
| 1926 | Fortaleza (5) | Guarany |
| 1927 | Fortaleza (6) | Fluminense |
| 1928 | Fortaleza (7) | Maguari |
| 1929 | Maguari (1) | Fortaleza |
| 1930 | Orion (1) | Maguari |
| 1931 | Ceará (8) | Orion |
| 1932 | Ceará (9) | Maguari |
| 1933 | Fortaleza (8) | Ceará |
| 1934 | Fortaleza (9) | América |
| 1935 | América (1) | Maguari |
| 1936 | Maguari (2) | Fortaleza |
| 1937 | Fortaleza (10) | Maguari |
| 1938 | Fortaleza (11) | Maguari |
| 1939 | Ceará (10) | Estrela do Mar |
| 1940 | Tramways (1) | Ferroviário |
| 1941 | Ceará (11) | Fortaleza |
| 1942 | Ceará (12) | Ferroviário |
| 1943 | Maguari (3) | Ceará |
| 1944 | Maguari (4) | Fortaleza |
| 1945 | Ferroviário (1) | Maguari |
| 1946 | Fortaleza (12) | Ferroviário |
| 1947 | Fortaleza (13) | Ferroviário |
| 1948 | Ceará (13) | América |
| 1949 | Fortaleza (14) | Ferroviário |
| 1950 | Ferroviário (2) | Fortaleza |
| 1951 | Ceará (14) | Ferroviário |
| 1952 | Ferroviário (3) | Ceará |
| 1953 | Fortaleza (15) | Ferroviário |
| 1954 | Fortaleza (16) | América |
| 1955 | Calouros do Ar (1) | Ferroviário |
| 1956 | Gentilândia (1) | Usina Ceará |
| 1957 | Ceará (15) | Usina Ceará |
| 1958 | Ceará (16) | Fortaleza |
| 1959 | Fortaleza (17) | Ceará |
| 1960 | Fortaleza (18) | Ferroviário |
| 1961 | Ceará (17) | Usina Ceará |
| 1962 | Ceará (18) | Usina Ceará |
| 1963 | Ceará (19) | Ferroviário |
| 1964 | Fortaleza (19) | Ceará |
| 1965 | Fortaleza (20) | Ceará |
| 1966 | América (2) | Ceará |
| 1967 | Fortaleza (21) | Ferroviário |
| 1968 | Ferroviário (4) | Fortaleza |
| 1969 | Fortaleza (22) | Ceará |
| 1970 | Ferroviário (5) | Ceará |
| 1971 | Ceará (20) | Fortaleza |
| 1972 | Ceará (21) | Fortaleza |
| 1973 | Fortaleza (23) | Ceará |
| 1974 | Fortaleza (24) | Ceará |
| 1975 | Ceará (22) | Fortaleza |
| 1976 | Ceará (23) | Fortaleza |
| 1977 | Ceará (24) | Fortaleza |
| 1978 | Ceará (25) | Fortaleza |
| 1979 | Ferroviário (6) | Ceará |
| 1980 | Ceará (26) | Ferroviário |
| 1981 | Ceará (27) | Ferroviário |
| 1982 | Fortaleza (25) | Ferroviário |
| 1983 | Fortaleza (26) | Ferroviário |
| 1984 | Ceará (28) | Fortaleza |
| 1985 | Fortaleza (27) | Ceará |
| 1986 | Ceará (29) | Fortaleza |
| 1987 | Fortaleza (28) | Ceará |
| 1988 | Ferroviário (7) | Fortaleza |
| 1989 | Ceará (30) | Ferroviário |
| 1990 | Ceará (31) | Fortaleza |
| 1991 | Fortaleza (29) | Ceará |
| 1992 (Note: The 1992 title was shared by mutual agreement.) | Fortaleza (30) | Tie for champion |
| 1992 | Ceará (32) | Tie for champion |
| 1992 | Tiradentes (1) | Tie for champion |
| 1992 | Icasa (1) | Tie for champion |
| 1993 | Ceará (33) | Icasa |
| 1994 | Ferroviário (8) | Ceará |
| 1995 | Ferroviário (9) | Icasa |
| 1996 | Ceará (34) | Ferroviário |
| 1997 | Ceará (35) | Fortaleza |
| 1998 | Ceará (36) | Ferroviário |
| 1999 | Ceará (37) | Juazeiro |
| 2000 | Fortaleza (31) | Ceará |
| 2001 | Fortaleza (32) | Ceará |
| 2002 | Ceará (38) | Fortaleza |
| 2003 | Fortaleza (33) | Ceará |
| 2004 | Fortaleza (34) | Ferroviário |
| 2005 | Fortaleza (35) | Icasa |
| 2006 | Ceará (39) | Fortaleza |
| 2007 | Fortaleza (36) | Icasa |
| 2008 | Fortaleza (37) | Icasa |
| 2009 | Fortaleza (38) | Ceará |
| 2010 | Fortaleza (39) | Ceará |
| 2011 | Ceará (40) | Guarani de Juazeiro |
| 2012 | Ceará (41) | Fortaleza |
| 2013 | Ceará (42) | Guarany de Sobral |
| 2014 | Ceará (43) | Fortaleza |
| 2015 | Fortaleza (40) | Ceará |
| 2016 | Fortaleza (41) | Uniclinic |
| 2017 | Ceará (44) | Ferroviário |
| 2018 | Ceará (45) | Fortaleza |
| 2019 | Fortaleza (42) | Ceará |
| 2020 | Fortaleza (43) | Ceará |
| 2021 | Fortaleza (44) | Ceará |
| 2022 | Fortaleza (45) | Caucaia |
| 2023 | Fortaleza (46) | Ceará |
| 2024 | Ceará (46) | Fortaleza |
| 2025 | Ceará (47) | Fortaleza |
| 2026 | Fortaleza (47) | Ceará |

=== Notes ===
- Icasa EC was refounded as ADRC Icasa in 2002.
- Ceará titles from 1915 to 1919 were only recognized in 2008. The 1914 title was not considered official.
- Uniclinic is the currently Atlético Cearense.

== Titles by team ==
Teams in bold stills active.

| Rank | Club | Winners | Winning years |
|---|---|---|---|
| 1 | **Ceará** | 47 | 1915, 1916, 1917, 1918, 1919, 1922, 1925, 1931, 1932, 1939, 1941, 1942, 1948, 1951, 1957, 1958, 1961, 1962, 1963, 1971, 1972, 1975, 1976, 1977, 1978, 1980, 1981, 1984, 1986, 1989, 1990, 1992 (shared), 1993, 1996, 1997, 1998, 1999, 2002, 2006, 2011, 2012, 2013, 2014, 2017, 2018, 2024, 2025 |
| 1 | **Fortaleza** | 47 | 1920, 1921, 1923, 1924, 1926, 1927, 1928, 1933, 1934, 1937, 1938, 1946, 1947, 1949, 1953, 1954, 1959, 1960, 1964, 1965, 1967, 1969, 1973, 1974, 1982, 1983, 1985, 1987, 1991, 1992 (shared), 2000, 2001, 2003, 2004, 2005, 2007, 2008, 2009, 2010, 2015, 2016, 2019, 2020, 2021, 2022, 2023, 2026 |
| 3 | **Ferroviário** | 9 | 1945, 1950, 1952, 1968, 1970, 1979, 1988, 1994, 1995 |
| 4 | Maguari | 4 | 1929, 1936, 1943, 1944 |
| 5 | **América** | 2 | 1935, 1966 |
| 6 | **Calouros do Ar** | 1 | 1955 |
| 6 | Gentilândia | 1 | 1956 |
| 6 | **Icasa** | 1 | 1992 (shared) |
| 6 | Orion | 1 | 1930 |
| 6 | **Tiradentes** | 1 | 1992 (shared) |
| 6 | Tramways | 1 | 1940 |

=== By city ===
| City | Championships | Clubs |
|---|---|---|
| Fortaleza | 114 | Ceará (47), Fortaleza (47), Ferroviário (9), Maguari (4), América (2), Calouros do Ar (1), Gentilândia (1), Orion (1), Tiradentes (1), Tramways (1) |
| Juazeiro do Norte | 1 | Icasa (1) |
