= 2011 Copa do Brasil =

Copa Kia do Brasil 2011
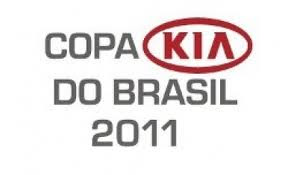

Tournament details
- Country: Brazil
- Dates: February 16 - June 8
- Teams: 64

Final positions
- Champions: (Rio de Janeiro (state)) Vasco da Gama
- Runners-up: (Paraná (state)) Coritiba

Tournament statistics
- Matches played: 111
- Goals scored: 315 (2.84 per match)
- Top goal scorer(s): Adriano; Alecsandro; Rafael Coelho; Kléber; William (5 goals each)

The 2011 Copa do Brasil (officially known as the 2011 Copa Kia do Brasil for sponsorship reasons) was the 23rd edition of the Copa do Brasil, Brazil's national football cup tournament. It began on February 16 and ended on June 8. This edition's champion was Vasco da Gama, with Coritiba ending as runners-up.

== Format ==
The competition is a single elimination knockout tournament featuring two-legged ties. In the first two rounds, if the away team wins the first match by 2 or more goals, the winner advances to the next round and the second leg will not be played. The away goals rule will be used. The winner qualifies to the 2012 Copa Libertadores.

== Qualified teams ==
Sixty-four teams qualified to the 2011 Copa do Brasil either through their states championship or through a ranking of teams.

=== Qualified by state championships and other competitions ===
Fifty-four teams qualified via their respective state competitions. Depending on their status with the Brazilian Football Confederation, each of the 27 state federations sent anywhere from one to three clubs. Each state determined their own qualification criteria, but they usually sent the clubs with best records in the state championships or other special competitions.

State	Team	Qualification method
Acre; 1 berth	Rio Branco (AC)	2010 Campeonato Acreano champion
Alagoas; 2 berths	Murici	2010 Campeonato Alagoano champion
Alagoas; 2 berths	ASA de Arapiraca	2010 Campeonato Alagoano runner-up
Amapá; 1 berth	Trem	2010 Campeonato Amapaense champion
Amazonas; 2 berths	Penarol	2010 Campeonato Amazonense champion
Amazonas; 2 berths	Fast Clube	2010 Campeonato Amazonense runner-up
Bahia; 2 berths	Vitória	2010 Campeonato Baiano champion
Bahia; 2 berths	Bahia	2010 Campeonato Baiano runner-up
Ceará; 2 berths	Fortaleza	2010 Campeonato Cearense champion
Ceará; 2 berths	Horizonte	2010 Copa Fares Lopes champion
Distrito Federal; 2 berths	Ceilândia	2010 Campeonato Brasiliense champion
Distrito Federal; 2 berths	Brasiliense	2010 Campeonato Brasiliense runner-up
Espírito Santo; 2 berths	Rio Branco (ES)	2010 Campeonato Capixaba champion
Espírito Santo; 2 berths	Vitória (ES)	2010 Copa Espírito Santo champion
Goiás; 2 berths	Atlético Goianiense	2010 Campeonato Goiano champion
Goiás; 2 berths	Santa Helena	2010 Campeonato Goiano runner-up
Maranhão; 2 berths	IAPE	2010 Copa União do Maranhão champion
Maranhão; 2 berths	Sampaio Corrêa	2010 Campeonato Maranhense champion
Mato Grosso; 2 berths	União	2010 Campeonato Mato-Grossense champion
Mato Grosso; 2 berths	Cuiabá	2010 Copa Governador do Mato Grosso champion
Mato Grosso do Sul; 2 berths	Comercial (MS)	2010 Campeonato Sul-Mato-Grossense champion
Mato Grosso do Sul; 2 berths	Naviraiense	2010 Campeonato Sul-Mato-Grossense runner-up
Minas Gerais; 3 berths	Atlético Mineiro	2010 Campeonato Mineiro champion
Minas Gerais; 3 berths	Ipatinga	2010 Campeonato Mineiro runner-up
Minas Gerais; 3 berths	Uberaba	2010 Taça Minas Gerais champion
Pará; 2 berths	Paysandu	2010 Campeonato Paraense champion
Pará; 2 berths	Águia de Marabá	2010 Campeonato Paraense runner-up
Paraíba; 2 berths	Treze	2010 Campeonato Paraibano champion
Paraíba; 2 berths	Botafogo (PB)	2010 Copa Paraíba champion
Paraná; 3 berths	Coritiba	2010 Campeonato Paranaense champion
Paraná; 3 berths	Atlético Paranaense	2010 Campeonato Paranaense runner-up
Paraná; 3 berths	Iraty	2010 Campeonato Paranaense 3rd place
Pernambuco; 2 berths	Sport	2010 Campeonato Pernambucano champion
Pernambuco; 2 berths	Náutico	2010 Campeonato Pernambucano runner-up
Piauí; 2 berths	Comercial (PI)	2010 Campeonato Piauiense champion
Piauí; 2 berths	Barras	2010 Campeonato Piauiense runner-up
Rio de Janeiro; 3 berths	Botafogo	2010 Campeonato Carioca champion
Rio de Janeiro; 3 berths	Flamengo	2010 Campeonato Carioca runner-up
Rio de Janeiro; 3 berths	Bangu	2010 Copa Rio runner-up
Rio Grande do Norte; 2 berths	ABC	2010 Campeonato Potiguar champion
Rio Grande do Norte; 2 berths	Corintians	2010 Campeonato Potiguar runner-up
Rio Grande do Sul; 3 berths	Caxias	2010 Campeonato Gaúcho 3rd place
Rio Grande do Sul; 3 berths	São José (RS)	2010 Campeonato Gaúcho 4th place
Rio Grande do Sul; 3 berths	Ypiranga (RS)	2009 Copa FGF runner-up
Rondônia; 1 berth	Vilhena	2010 Campeonato Rondoniense champion
Roraima; 1 berth	Baré	2010 Campeonato Roraimense champion
São Paulo; 3 berths	Santo André	2010 Campeonato Paulista runner-up
São Paulo; 3 berths	Grêmio Prudente	2010 Campeonato Paulista 3rd place
São Paulo; 3 berths	Paulista	2010 Copa Paulista champion
Santa Catarina; 2 berths	Avaí	2010 Campeonato Catarinense champion
Santa Catarina; 2 berths	Brusque	2010 Copa Santa Catarina champion
Sergipe; 2 berths	River Plate (SE)	2010 Campeonato Sergipano champion
Sergipe; 2 berths	São Domingos	2010 Copa Governo de Sergipe champion
Tocantins; 1 berth	Gurupi	2010 Campeonato Tocantinense champion

=== Qualified by CBF club ranking ===
Ten clubs qualified as one of the top ten clubs in CBF's club ranking, excluding those qualified by state competitions and clubs playing in the 2011 Copa Libertadores.

Pos	Team	State	Points (2010)
3	Vasco da Gama	Rio de Janeiro	2,086
5	São Paulo	São Paulo	2,049
7	Palmeiras	São Paulo	2,012
13	Goiás	Goiás	1,523
14	Guarani	São Paulo	1,516
17	Portuguesa	São Paulo	1,405
22	Santa Cruz	Pernambuco	1,140
23	Paraná	Paraná	1,080
24	Ceará	Ceará	1,056
25	Ponte Preta	São Paulo	1,047

== Bracket ==
Teams that play in their home stadium in the first leg are marked with †.

First Phase
(Rio de Janeiro (state)) Flamengo	3	-
(Alagoas) Murici †	0	-
(Ceará) Fortaleza	0	4
(Amazonas (Brazilian state)) Fast †	2	1
(São Paulo (state)) Guarani	4	0
(Mato Grosso) União †	4	0
(Alagoas) ASA	1	3
(Ceará) Horizonte †	3	3
(Minas Gerais) Atlético Mineiro	3	8
(Maranhão) IAPE †	2	1
(São Paulo (state)) Grêmio Prudente	1	3
(Paraná (state)) Iraty †	3	0
Ceará	2	-
(Mato Grosso) Cuiabá †	0	-
(Federal District (Brazil)) Brasiliense	1	2
(Pará) Águia de Marabá †	1	0
(Bahia) Vitória	1	0
(Paraíba) Botafogo (PB) †	3	0
(Rio Grande do Sul) Caxias	5	-
(Federal District (Brazil)) Ceilândia †	0	-
(Paraná (state)) Coritiba	1	2
(Rio Grande do Sul) Ypiranga (RS) †	0	0
(Goiás) Atlético Goianiense	2	1
(Santa Catarina (state)) Brusque †	3	0
(São Paulo (state)) Palmeiras	2	5
(Piauí) Comercial (PI) †	1	1
(Minas Gerais) Uberaba	3	-
(Goiás) Santa Helena †	1	-
(Pernambuco) Sport	0	2
(Maranhão) Sampaio Corrêa †	0	2
(São Paulo (state)) Santo André	2	1
(Mato Grosso do Sul) Naviraiense †	1	0
(Rio de Janeiro (state)) Vasco da Gama	6	-
(Mato Grosso do Sul) Comercial (MS) †	1	-
(Rio Grande do Norte) ABC	1	2
(Piauí) Barras †	1	1
(São Paulo (state)) Portuguesa	1	1
(Rio de Janeiro (state)) Bangu †	3	0
(Pernambuco) Náutico	1	6
(Amapá) Trem †	2	0
(Paraná (state)) Atlético Paranaense	1	3
(Acre (state)) Rio Branco (AC) †	2	1
(São Paulo (state)) Paulista	0	3
(Rio Grande do Sul) São José (RS) †	1	0
Bahia	0	5
(Sergipe) São Domingos †	0	1
(Pará) Paysandu	3	2
(Amazonas (Brazilian state)) Penarol †	2	2
(Rio de Janeiro (state)) Botafogo	0	1(4)
(Sergipe) River Plate †	1	0(1)
(Paraná (state)) Paraná	1	3
(Tocantins) Gurupi †	1	0
(Santa Catarina (state)) Avaí	3	-
(Rondônia) Vilhena †	0	-
(Minas Gerais) Ipatinga	1	3
(Espírito Santo) Rio Branco (ES) †	0	0
(São Paulo (state)) São Paulo	3	-
(Paraíba) Treze †	0	-
(Pernambuco) Santa Cruz	4	-
(Rio Grande do Norte) Corintians †	1	-
Goiás	4	-
(Espírito Santo) Vitória (ES) †	1	-
(São Paulo (state)) Ponte Preta	1	-
(Roraima) Baré †	0	-

Second Phase
(Rio de Janeiro (state)) Flamengo	3	-
(Ceará) Fortaleza †	0	-
(São Paulo (state)) Guarani †	1	2
(Ceará) Horizonte	1	2
(Minas Gerais) Atlético Mineiro	1	0
(São Paulo (state)) Grêmio Prudente †	2	0
Ceará	0	2
(Federal District (Brazil)) Brasiliense †	0	1
(Paraíba) Botafogo (PB) †	0	1
(Rio Grande do Sul) Caxias	1	3
(Paraná (state)) Coritiba	2	3
(Goiás) Atlético Goianiense †	1	1
(São Paulo (state)) Palmeiras	4	-
(Minas Gerais) Uberaba †	0	-
(Maranhão) Sampaio Corrêa †	3	0
(São Paulo (state)) Santo André	2	1
(Rio de Janeiro (state)) Vasco da Gama	0	2
(Rio Grande do Norte) ABC †	0	1
(Rio de Janeiro (state)) Bangu †	0	-
(Pernambuco) Náutico	2	-
(Paraná (state)) Atlético Paranaense	2	-
(São Paulo (state)) Paulista †	0	-
Bahia	0	2
(Pará) Paysandu †	0	1
(Rio de Janeiro (state)) Botafogo	2	3
(Paraná (state)) Paraná †	1	0
(Santa Catarina (state)) Avaí	1	4
(Minas Gerais) Ipatinga †	1	1
(São Paulo (state)) São Paulo	0	2
(Pernambuco) Santa Cruz †	1	0
Goiás	3	-
(São Paulo (state)) Ponte Preta †	0	-

Round of 16
(Rio de Janeiro (state)) Flamengo †	1	3
(Ceará) Horizonte	1	0
(São Paulo (state)) Grêmio Prudente	1	1
Ceará †	2	2
(Rio Grande do Sul) Caxias	0	0
(Paraná (state)) Coritiba †	4	1
(São Paulo (state)) Palmeiras	2	1
(São Paulo (state)) Santo André †	1	0
(Rio de Janeiro (state)) Vasco da Gama	3	0
(Pernambuco) Náutico †	0	0
Atlético Paranaense	1	5
Bahia †	1	0
(Rio de Janeiro (state)) Botafogo †	2	1
(Santa Catarina (state)) Avaí	2	1
(São Paulo (state)) São Paulo	1	1
Goiás †	0	0

Quarterfinals
(Rio de Janeiro (state)) Flamengo †	1	2
Ceará	2	2
(Paraná (state)) Coritiba	6	0
(São Paulo (state)) Palmeiras †	0	2
(Rio de Janeiro (state)) Vasco da Gama	2	1
(Paraná (state)) Atlético Paranaense †	2	1
(Santa Catarina (state)) Avaí	0	3
(São Paulo (state)) São Paulo †	1	1

Semifinals
Ceará †	0	0
(Paraná (state)) Coritiba	0	1
Finals
(Paraná (state)) Coritiba	0	3
(Rio de Janeiro (state)) Vasco da Gama †	1	2
(Rio de Janeiro (state)) Vasco da Gama †	1	2
(Santa Catarina (state)) Avaí	1	0

== First phase ==
The First Phase began on February 16 and ended on March 3.

=== Group 1 ===
February 16	Murici (Alagoas)	0–3	(Rio de Janeiro (state)) Flamengo	Maceió
21:00 (UTC−03:00)		Report	Ronaldinho 66'; Renato 72'; Guilherme Negueba 90'	Stadium: Estádio Rei Pelé; Attendance: 15,100; Referee: Jailson Macedo Freitas (Bahia)

Flamengo advanced because they won by at least two goals as the visiting team in the first game.

=== Group 2 ===
February 16	Fast (Amazonas (Brazilian state))	2–0	(Ceará) Fortaleza	Manaus
20:00 (UTC−04:00)	Claílson 14'; Ricardo 85'	Report		Stadium: Estádio Roberto Simonsen (SESI); Attendance: 1,500; Referee: Arnoldo Vasconcelos Figarela (Rondônia)

February 23	Fortaleza (Ceará)	4–1	(Amazonas (Brazilian state)) Fast	Fortaleza
21:00 (UTC−03:00)	Reginaldo Jr. 1', 84'; Gilmak 66'; Guto 75'	Report	Pedro Henrique 61'	Stadium: Estádio Alcides Santos; Attendance: 5,375; Referee: Suelson Diógenes de França Medeiros (Rio Grande do Norte)

Tied on points 3–3, Fortaleza advanced on greater goal difference.

=== Group 3 ===
February 16	União (Mato Grosso)	4–4	(São Paulo (state)) Guarani	Rondonópolis
20:00 (UTC−03:00)	Ronaldo 27'; Danilo Cruz 54'; Maricá 65', 67'	Report	Ronaldo Tres 2'; Marcos Denner 10'; Dadá 14'; Flávio 36'	Stadium: Estádio Engenheiro Luthero Lopes (Caldeirão); Attendance: 4,102; Referee: Marcos Mateus Pereira (Mato Grosso do Sul)

February 23	Guarani (São Paulo (state))	0–0	(Mato Grosso) União	Campinas
19:30 (UTC−03:00)		Report		Stadium: Estádio Brinco de Ouro; Attendance: 2,131; Referee: Antônio Frederico de Carvalho Schneider (Rio de Janeiro)

Tied on points 2–2 and equal on goal difference, Guarani advanced on away goals.

=== Group 4 ===
February 16	Horizonte (Ceará)	3–1	(Alagoas) ASA	Horizonte
20:00 (UTC−03:00)	Júnior Cearense 3'; Siloé 12'; Lucio Maranhão 45+2'	Report	Didira 30'	Stadium: Estádio Olímpico Horácio Domingos de Sousa (Domingão); Attendance: 1,015; Referee: Reginaldo Gomes (Rio Grande do Norte)

February 23	ASA (Alagoas)	3–3	(Ceará) Horizonte	Arapiraca
21:00 (UTC−03:00)	André Nunes 44'; Tiago 56', 62'	Report	Robert 11'; Júnior Cearense 33'; Elanardo 78'	Stadium: Estadio Municipal Coaracy de Mata Fonseca (Fumeirão); Attendance: 2,911; Referee: Claudio Francisco Lima e Silva (Sergipe)

ASA advanced on points 4–1.

=== Group 5 ===
February 23	IAPE (Maranhão)	2–3	(Minas Gerais) Atlético Mineiro	São Luís
21:50 (UTC−03:00)	Vanvan 14', 39'	Report	Renan Oliveira 6'; Diego Tardelli 46'; Ricardo Bueno 78'	Stadium: Estádio Nhozinho Santos; Attendance: 12,709; Referee: Andrey da Silva e Silva (Pará)

March 2	Atlético Mineiro (Minas Gerais)	8–1	(Maranhão) IAPE	Sete Lagoas
21:00 (UTC−03:00)	Renan Oliveira 1', 21'; Ricardinho 8'; Jóbson 68', 86'; Neto Berola 78'; Toró 80'; Diego Tardelli 88'	Report	Robson 89'	Stadium: Estádio Joaquim Henrique Nogueira (Arena do Jacaré); Attendance: 5,433; Referee: Wagner dos Santos Rosa (Rio de Janeiro)

Atlético Mineiro advanced on points 6–0.

=== Group 6 ===
February 16	Iraty (Paraná (state))	3–1	(São Paulo (state)) Grêmio Prudente	Irati
17:00 (UTC−02:00)	Sílvio 45'; Willian 50'; Eydison 58'	Report	Adriano 55'	Stadium: Estádio Coronel Emílio Gomes; Attendance: 1,080; Referee: Edmundo Alves do Nascimento (Santa Catarina)

February 23	Grêmio Prudente (São Paulo (state))	3–0	(Paraná (state)) Iraty	Presidente Prudente
21:00 (UTC−03:00)	Jandson 33', 36'; Adriano 68'	Report		Stadium: Estádio Eduardo José Farah (Prudentão); Attendance: 413; Referee: João Lupato (Mato Grosso do Sul)

Tied on points 3–3, Grêmio Prudente advanced on greater goal difference.

=== Group 7 ===
February 23	Cuiabá (Mato Grosso)	0–2	Ceará	Cuiabá
20:50 (UTC−04:00)		Report	Iarley 1'; Eusébio 79'	Stadium: Estádio Presidente Dutra; Attendance: 2,794; Referee: Elmo Alves Resende Cunha (Goiás)

Ceará advanced because they won by at least two goals as the visiting team in the first game.

=== Group 8 ===
February 23	Águia de Marabá (Pará)	1–1	(Federal District (Brazil)) Brasiliense	Marabá
21:00 (UTC−03:00)	Patrick 30'	Report	Rômulo 26'	Stadium: Estádio Municipal Zinho de Oliveira; Attendance: 1,877; Referee: Robson Martins Ferreira (Maranhão)

March 2	Brasiliense (Federal District (Brazil))	2–0	(Pará) Águia de Marabá	Taguatinga
21:00 (UTC−03:00)	Ruy 16'; Adrianinho 76'	Report		Stadium: Estádio Elmo Serejo Farias (Serejão); Attendance: 1,917; Referee: Eduardo Tomaz de Aquino Valadão (Goiás)

Brasiliense advanced on points 4–1.

=== Group 9 ===
February 16	Botafogo (PB) (Paraíba)	3–1	(Bahia) Vitória	João Pessoa
20:00 (UTC−03:00)	Henrique 46'; Chapinha 60'; Paulinho Macaíba 90+3'	Report	Viáfara 86'	Stadium: Estádio José Américo de Almeida Filho (Almeidão); Attendance: 1,225; Referee: Cláudio Mercante (Pernambuco)

February 24	Vitória (Bahia)	0–0	(Paraíba) Botafogo (PB)	Salvador
21:00 (UTC−03:00)		Report		Stadium: Estádio Manoel Barradas (Barradão); Attendance: 10,172; Referee: Marcos André Gomes da Penha (Espírito Santo)

Botafogo (PB) advanced on points 4–1.

=== Group 10 ===
February 16	Ceilândia (Federal District (Brazil))	0–5	(Rio Grande do Sul) Caxias	Ceilândia
17:00 (UTC−02:00)		Report	Neto 15'; Lima 18', 29'; Pedro Henrique 38'; Éverton 44'	Stadium: Estádio Maria de Lourdes Abadia; Attendance: 428; Referee: Wellington Ferreira Branquinho (Goiás)

Caxias advanced because they won by at least two goals as the visiting team in the first game.

=== Group 11 ===
February 16	Ypiranga (RS) (Rio Grande do Sul)	0–1	(Paraná (state)) Coritiba	Erechim
19:30 (UTC−02:00)		Report	Jonas 17'	Stadium: Estádio Olímpico Colosso da Lagoa; Attendance: 1,743; Referee: Célio Amorim (Santa Catarina)

February 24	Coritiba (Paraná (state))	2–0	(Rio Grande do Sul) Ypiranga (RS)	Curitiba
19:30 (UTC−03:00)	Eltinho 78'; Rafinha 83'	Report		Stadium: Estádio Couto Pereira; Attendance: 8,640; Referee: Milton Etsuo Ballerini (São Paulo)

Coritiba advanced on points 6–0.

=== Group 12 ===
February 23	Brusque (Santa Catarina (state))	3–2	(Goiás) Atlético Goianiense	Brusque
21:00 (UTC−03:00)	William 19', 43'; Aloisio 30'	Report	Felipe 11'; Marcão 66'	Stadium: Estádio Augusto Bauer; Attendance: 1,866; Referee: Marcelo Aparecido Ribeiro de Souza (São Paulo)

March 2	Atlético Goianiense (Goiás)	1–0	(Santa Catarina (state)) Brusque	Goiânia
21:00 (UTC−03:00)	Felipe 60'	Report		Stadium: Estádio Antônio Accioly; Attendance: 5,356; Referee: Wilton Pereira Sampaio (Distrito Federal)

Tied on points 3–3 and tied on goal difference, Atlético Goianiense advanced on away goals.

=== Group 13 ===
February 23	Comercial (PI) (Piauí)	1–2	(São Paulo (state)) Palmeiras	Teresina
21:50 (UTC−03:00)	Rafael 75'	Report	Adriano 31'; Kléber 46'	Stadium: Estádio Governador Alberto Tavares Silva (Albertão); Attendance: 13,286; Referee: José de Caldas Souza (Distrito Federal)

March 2	Palmeiras (São Paulo (state))	5–1	(Piauí) Comercial (PI)	São Paulo
21:50 (UTC−03:00)	Adriano 62', 65', 78', 80'; Gabriel Silva 83'	Report	Binha 72'	Stadium: Estádio Municipal Paulo Machado de Carvalho (Pacaembu); Attendance: 3,509; Referee: Márcio Changas da Silva (Rio Grande do Sul)

Palmeiras advanced on points 6–0.

=== Group 14 ===
February 16	Santa Helena (Goiás)	1–3	(Minas Gerais) Uberaba	Santa Helena de Goiás
21:00 (UTC−02:00)	Lukinha 68'	Report	Cristiano Brasília 20', 37'; Cadu 45+3'	Stadium: Estádio Pedro Romualdo Cabral; Attendance: 1,151; Referee: Wilton Pereira Sampaio (Distrito Federal)

Uberaba advanced because they won by at least two goals as the visiting team in the first game.

=== Group 15 ===
February 24	Sampaio Corrêa (Maranhão)	0–0	(Pernambuco) Sport	São Luís
21:00 (UTC−03:00)		Report		Stadium: Estádio Nhozinho Santos; Attendance: 12,092; Referee: Joaquim Webesther Florêncio Martins (Ceará)

March 2	Sport (Pernambuco)	2–2	(Maranhão) Sampaio Corrêa	Recife
21:00 (UTC−03:00)	Wellington Saci 51'; Tadeu 67'	Report	Robinho 19'; Rone 70'	Stadium: Estádio Adelmar da Costa Carvalho (Ilha do Retiro); Attendance: 9,615; Referee: Diego Pombo Lopez (Bahia)

Tied on points 2–2 and tied on goal difference, Sampaio Corrêa advanced on away goals.

=== Group 16 ===
February 16	Naviraiense (Mato Grosso do Sul)	1–2	(São Paulo (state)) Santo André	Naviraí
20:30 (UTC−03:00)	Nelson Júnior 79'	Report	Célio Codó 62'; Vitor Hugo 69'	Stadium: Estádio Jose Viroti (Virotão); Attendance: 2,304; Referee: Nilo Neves de Souza Júnior (Paraná)

February 23	Santo André (São Paulo (state))	1–0	(Mato Grosso do Sul) Naviraiense	Santo André
21:00 (UTC−03:00)	Adriano Louzada 39' (pen.)	Report		Stadium: Estádio Municipal Bruno José Daniel (Brunão); Attendance: 419; Referee: Adriano Milczvski (Paraná)

Santo André advanced on points 6–0.

=== Group 17 ===
February 23	Comercial (MS) (Mato Grosso do Sul)	1–6	(Rio de Janeiro (state)) Vasco da Gama	Campo Grande
20:50 (UTC−04:00)	Anderson 63' (pen.)	Report	Felipe Bastos 4'; Marcel 16' (pen.), 24'; Jéferson 44'; Éder Luís 57'; Rômulo 66'	Stadium: Estádio Universitário Pedro Pedrossian (Morenão); Attendance: 4,381; Referee: Antonio Denival de Morais (Paraná)

Vasco da Gama advanced because they won by at least two goals as the visiting team in the first game.

=== Group 18 ===
February 24	Barras (Piauí)	1–1	(Rio Grande do Norte) ABC	Teresina
21:00 (UTC−03:00)	Marquinhos Vitoria 46'	Report	Irineu 68'	Stadium: Estádio Governador Alberto Tavares Silva (Albertão); Attendance: 1,222; Referee: José Cleuton Sousa Lima (Ceará)

March 2	ABC (Rio Grande do Norte)	2–1	(Piauí) Barras	Natal
21:00 (UTC−03:00)	Irineu 1'; Leandrão 42'	Report	Neném B. 66'	Stadium: Estádio Maria Lamas Farache (Frasqueirão); Attendance: 5,286; Referee: Gleidson Ferreira Leite (Pernambuco)

ABC advanced on points 4–1.

=== Group 19 ===
February 16	Bangu (Rio de Janeiro (state))	3–1	(São Paulo (state)) Portuguesa	Rio de Janeiro
17:00 (UTC−02:00)	Thiago Galhardo 15', 75'; Pipico 61'	Report	Kempes 45'	Stadium: Estádio Proletário Guilherme da Silveira (Moça Bonita); Attendance: 836; Referee: Devarly Lira do Rosário (Espírito Santo)

February 23	Portuguesa (São Paulo (state))	1–0	(Rio de Janeiro (state)) Bangu	São Paulo
21:00 (UTC−03:00)	Ademir Sopa 67'	Report		Stadium: Estádio Doutor Osvaldo Teixeira Duarte (Canindé); Attendance: 1,036; Referee: Renato Cardoso da Conceição (Minas Gerais)

Tied on points 3–3, Bangu advanced on greater goal difference.

=== Group 20 ===
February 23	Trem (Amapá)	2–1	(Pernambuco) Náutico	Macapá
21:00 (UTC−03:00)	Lensandro 73'; Ari 90+3'	Report	Airton 75'	Stadium: Estádio Municipal Glicério de Souza Marques (Glicerão); Attendance: 1,005; Referee: Dewson Fernando Freitas da Silva (Pará)

March 3	Náutico (Pernambuco)	6–0	(Amapá) Trem	Recife
19:30 (UTC−03:00)	Bruno Meneghel 12', 35'; Airton 16'; Ricardo Xavier 49'; Kieza 56'; Deyvid Sacconi 76'	Report		Stadium: Estádio Eládio de Barros Carvalho (Aflitos); Attendance: 11,073; Referee: José Renato Albuquerque Soares (Paraíba)

Tied on points 3–3, Náutico advanced on greater goal difference.

=== Group 21 ===
February 23	Rio Branco (AC) (Acre (state))	2–1	(Paraná (state)) Atlético Paranaense	Rio Branco
20:00 (UTC−04:00)	Juliano César 28'; Alê 34' (o.g.)	Report	Lucas 79'	Stadium: Arena da Floresta; Attendance: 10,000; Referee: Wagner Reway (Mato Grosso)

March 2	Atlético Paranaense (Paraná (state))	3–1	(Acre (state)) Rio Branco (AC)	Curitiba
19:30 (UTC−03:00)	Guerrón 13'; Lucas 66', 68'	Report	Araújo 83'	Stadium: Arena da Baixada; Attendance: 9,620; Referee: Paulo Henrique de Godoy Bezerra (Santa Catarina)

Tied on points 3–3, Atlético Paranaense advanced on goal difference.

=== Group 22 ===
February 24	São José (RS) (Rio Grande do Sul)	1–0	(São Paulo (state)) Paulista	Porto Alegre
21:00 (UTC−03:00)	Xavier 82'	Report		Stadium: Estádio Passo d'Areia; Attendance: 375; Referee: Jefferson Schmidt (Santa Catarina)

March 2	Paulista (São Paulo (state))	3–0	(Rio Grande do Sul) São José (RS)	Jundiaí
21:00 (UTC−03:00)	Hernane 19'; Henrique 25'; Barboza 26'	Report		Stadium: Estádio Dr. Jayme Pinheiro de Ulhoa Cintra; Attendance: 757; Referee: Cleisson Veloso Pereira (Minas Gerais)

Tied on points 3–3, Paulista advanced on greater goal difference.

=== Group 23 ===
February 16	São Domingos (Sergipe)	0–0	Bahia	Aracaju
21:00 (UTC−03:00)		Report		Stadium: Estádio Estadual Lourival Baptista (Batistão); Attendance: 2,005; Referee: Nielson Nogueira Dias (Pernambuco)

February 23	Bahia	5–1	(Sergipe) São Domingos	Salvador
21:00 (UTC−03:00)	Marcos 4', 50'; Ramón 35'; Rafael 52', 66'	Report	André Saúde 85'	Stadium: Estádio Metropolitano Roberto Santos (Pituaçu); Attendance: 7,754; Referee: João Bosco Sátiro da Nóbrega (Paraíba)

Bahia advanced on points 4–1.

=== Group 24 ===
February 23	Penarol (Amazonas (Brazilian state))	2–3	(Pará) Paysandu	Itacoatiara
16:00 (UTC−04:00)	Marcos Pezão 28'; Rondinelli 45+1'	Report	Sandro Goiano 7'; Mendes 64', 79' (pen.)	Stadium: Estádio Floro de Mendonça; Attendance: 1,772; Referee: Antônio Neuricláudio Costa (Acre)

March 2	Paysandu (Pará)	2–2	(Amazonas (Brazilian state)) Penarol	Belém
21:00 (UTC−03:00)	Ciboy 58'; Marcos Pezão 84'	Report	Marquinho 90'; Mendes 90+3'	Stadium: Estádio Leônidas Sodré de Castro (Curuzu); Attendance: 4,868; Referee: Mayron Frederico dos Reis Novais (Maranhão)

Paysandu advance on points 4–1.

=== Group 25 ===
February 23	River Plate (Sergipe)	1–0	(Rio de Janeiro (state)) Botafogo	Aracaju
19:30 (UTC−03:00)	Bebeto Oliveira 86'	Report		Stadium: Estádio Estadual Lourival Baptista (Batistão); Attendance: 10,497; Referee: Marielson Alves Silva (Bahia)

March 3	Botafogo (Rio de Janeiro (state))	1–0 (4–1 p)	(Sergipe) River Plate	Rio de Janeiro
21:30 (UTC−03:00)	Bebeto 40' (o.g.)	Report		Stadium: Estádio Olímpico João Havelange (Engenhão); Attendance: 3,901; Referee: Emerson de Almeida Ferreira (Minas Gerais)

Tied 1–1 on points and equal on goal difference, Botafogo advanced on penalties 4–1.

=== Group 26 ===
February 16	Gurupi (Tocantins)	1–1	(Paraná (state)) Paraná	Gurupi
20:00 (UTC−03:00)	Wellington 58'	Report	Kelvin 69' (pen.)	Stadium: Estádio Gilberto Resende Rocha (Resendão); Attendance: 1,109; Referee: Rodrigo Raposo (Distrito Federal)

February 23	Paraná (Paraná (state))	3–0	(Tocantins) Gurupi	Curitiba
21:00 (UTC−03:00)	Renato 26'; Kelvin 69' (pen.); Douglas Packer 90'	Report		Stadium: Estádio Durival Britto e Silva (Vila Capanema); Attendance: 1,272; Referee: Raphael Claus (São Paulo)

Paraná advanced on points 4–1.

=== Group 27 ===
February 23	Vilhena (Rondônia)	0–3	(Santa Catarina (state)) Avaí	Vilhena
20:00 (UTC−04:00)		Report	Estrada 4'; William 64', 77'	Stadium: Estádio Arnaldo Lopes Martins (Portal da Amazônia); Attendance: 1,001; Referee: Alinor Silva da Paixão (Mato Grosso)

Avai advanced because they won by at least two goals as the visiting team in the first game.

=== Group 28 ===
February 23	Rio Branco (ES) (Espírito Santo)	0–1	(Minas Gerais) Ipatinga	Vitória
21:00 (UTC−03:00)		Report	Léo Medeiros 20'	Stadium: Estádio Salvador Venâncio da Costa; Attendance: 1,976; Referee: Rodrigo Nunes de Sá (Rio de Janeiro)

March 2	Ipatinga (Minas Gerais)	3–0	(Espírito Santo) Rio Branco (ES)	Ipatinga
21:00 (UTC−03:00)	Chiquinho 8'; Alessandro 33', 69'	Report		Stadium: Estádio Municipal Epaminondas Mendes Brito (Ipatingão); Attendance: 1,841; Referee: Raphael Claus (São Paulo)

Ipatinga advanced on points 6–0.

=== Group 29 ===
February 16	Treze (Paraíba)	0–3	(São Paulo (state)) São Paulo	Campina Grande
21:00 (UTC−03:00)		Report	Dagoberto 10', 26'; Fernandinho 47'	Stadium: Estádio Governador Ernani Sátyro (Amigão); Attendance: 12,350; Referee: Arilson Bispo da Anunciação (Bahia)

São Paulo advanced because they won by at least two goals as the visiting team in the first game.

=== Group 30 ===
February 23	Coríntians (Rio Grande do Norte)	1–4	(Pernambuco) Santa Cruz	Caicó
21:50 (UTC−03:00)	Júnior Juazeiro 10'	Report	Alexandre Silva 19'; Cléber Goiano 37', 44'; Gilberto 46'	Stadium: Estádio Senador Dinarte Mariz (Marizão); Attendance: 676; Referee: Francisco de Assis Almeida Filho (Ceará)

Santa Cruz advanced because they won by at least two goals as the visiting team in the first game.

=== Group 31 ===
February 16	Vitória (ES) (Espírito Santo)	1–4	Goiás	Vitória
21:00 (UTC−02:00)	Hércules 61'	Report	Hugo 17'; Toloi 69'; Marcelo Costa 75', 87'	Stadium: Estádio Salvador Venâncio da Costa; Attendance: 1,370; Referee: Emerson de Almeida Ferreira (Minas Gerais)

Goiás advanced because they won by at least two goals as the visiting team in the first game.

=== Group 32 ===
February 23	Baré (Roraima)	0–1	(São Paulo (state)) Ponte Preta	Boa Vista
20:00 (UTC−04:00)		Report	João Paulo 20'	Stadium: Estádio Flamarion Vasconcelos; Attendance: 1,070; Referee: Edmar Campos da Encarnação (Amazonas)

March 3	Ponte Preta (São Paulo (state))	(canceled)	(Roraima) Baré	Campinas
19:30 (UTC−03:00)				Stadium: Estádio Moisés Lucarelli; Referee: Carlos Eduardo Vieira Arêas (Santa Catarina)

Ponte Preta advanced because Baré was eliminated from the competitions by the STJD.

== Second phase ==
The Second Phase began on March 16 and ended on April 6.

=== Group 33 ===
March 16	Fortaleza (Ceará)	0–3	(Rio de Janeiro (state)) Flamengo	Fortaleza
21:50 UTC−03:00		Report	Renato 20'; Wanderley 60'; Diego Maurício 90+1'	Stadium: Estádio Placido Aderaldo Castelo (Castelão); Attendance: 21,089; Referee: Nielson Nogueira Dias (Pernambuco)

Flamengo advanced because they won by at least two goals as the visiting team in the first game.

=== Group 34 ===
March 17	Horizonte (Ceará)	1–1	(São Paulo (state)) Guarani	Horizonte
21:00 UTC−03:00	Siloé 39'	Report	Fabinho 83'	Stadium: Estádio Olímpico Horácio Domingos de Sousa (Domingão); Attendance: 1,200; Referee: João Bosco Sátiro de Nobrega (Paraíba)

March 30	Guarani (São Paulo (state))	2–2	(Ceará) Horizonte	Campinas
21:00 UTC−03:00	Márcio Guerreiro 42'; Dairo 90+1'	Report	Diego Palhinha 50', 83'	Stadium: Estádio Brinco de Ouro; Attendance: 1,914; Referee: Gutemberg de Paula Fonseca (Rio de Janeiro)

Tied on points 2–2, Horizonte advanced on away goals.

=== Group 35 ===
March 31	Grêmio Prudente (São Paulo (state))	2–1	(Minas Gerais) Atlético Mineiro	Presidente Prudente
20:00 UTC−03:00	Eraldo 10'; Juan Lima 37'	Report	Magno Alves 34'	Stadium: Estádio Eduardo José Farah (Prudentão); Attendance: 989; Referee: Antonio Denival de Morais (Paraná)

April 6	Atlético Mineiro (Minas Gerais)	0–0	(São Paulo (state)) Grêmio Prudente	Sete Lagoas
21:50 UTC−03:00		Report		Stadium: Estádio Joaquim Henrique Nogueira (Arena do Jacaré); Attendance: 6,968; Referee: Pathrice Wallace Corrêa Maia (Rio de Janeiro

Grêmio Prudente advanced on points 4–1.

=== Group 36 ===
March 16	Brasiliense (Federal District (Brazil))	0–0	Ceará	Taguatinga
21:50 UTC−03:00		Report		Stadium: Estádio Elmo Serejo Farias (Serejão); Attendance: 5,109; Referee: Janio Pires Gonçalves (Tocantins)

March 30	Ceará	2–1	(Federal District (Brazil)) Brasiliense	Fortaleza
21:50 UTC−03:00	Fabrício 25'; Marcelo Nicácio 90+2'	Report	Ruy 7'	Stadium: Estádio Placido Aderaldo Castelo (Castelão); Attendance: 32,179; Referee: Cláudio Mercante (Pernambuco)

Ceará advanced on points 4–1.

=== Group 37 ===
March 16	Botafogo (PB) (Paraíba)	0–1	(Rio Grande do Sul) Caxias	João Pessoa
21:00 UTC−03:00		Report	Marcelo 63'	Stadium: Estádio José Américo de Almeida Filho (Almeidão); Attendance: 1,463; Referee: Italo Medeiros de Azevedo (Rio Grande do Norte)

April 6	Caxias (Rio Grande do Sul)	3–1	(Paraíba) Botafogo (PB)	Caxias do Sul
21:00 UTC−03:00	Marcelo 8'; Lima 37'; Gerley 45+1'	Report	Charles Wagner 38'	Stadium: Estádio Francisco Stédile (Centenário); Attendance: 2,562; Referee: Wagner Reway (Mato Grosso)

Caxias advanced on points 6–0.

=== Group 38 ===
March 17	Atlético Goianiense (Goiás)	1–2	(Paraná (state)) Coritiba	Goiânia
21:30 UTC−03:00	Gilson 20'	Report	Marcos Aurélio 35', 63'	Stadium: Estádio do Governo do Estado de Goiás (Serra Dourada); Attendance: 4,452; Referee: Alicio Pena Junior (Minas Gerais)

March 30	Coritiba (Paraná (state))	3–1	(Goiás) Atlético Goianiense	Curitiba
21:50 UTC−03:00	Anderson Aquino 8', 17'; Éverton Ribeiro 84'	Report	Juninho 70'	Stadium: Estádio Major Antônio Couto Pereira; Attendance: 9,444; Referee: Vinícius Costa da Costa (Rio Grande do Sul

Coritiba advance on points 6–0.

=== Group 39 ===
March 16	Uberaba (Minas Gerais)	0–4	(São Paulo (state)) Palmeiras	Uberaba
21:50 UTC−03:00		Report	Luan 14', 22'; Kléber 42', 90'	Stadium: Estádio Municipal Engenheiro João Guido (Uberabão); Attendance: 8,206; Referee: Pablo dos Santos Alves (Espírito Santo)

Palmeiras advanced because they won by at least two goals as the visiting team in the first game.

=== Group 40 ===
March 16	Sampaio Corrêa (Maranhão)	3–2	(São Paulo (state)) Santo André	São Luís
21:00 UTC−03:00	Bruno Limão 39'; Rone 45', 58'	Report	Allan 63'; Célio Codó 76'	Stadium: Estádio Nhozinho Santos; Attendance: 12,855; Referee: Wladyerisson Silva Oliveira (Ceará)

April 6	Santo André (São Paulo (state))	1–0	(Maranhão) Sampaio Corrêa	Santo André
21:50 UTC−03:00	Juan Felipe 21'	Report		Stadium: Estádio Municipal Bruno José Daniel; Attendance: 594; Referee: Cleisson Veloso Pereira (Minas Gerais)

Tied on points 3–3, Santo André advanced on away goals.

=== Group 41 ===
March 30	ABC (Rio Grande do Norte)	0–0	(Rio de Janeiro (state)) Vasco da Gama	Natal
21:50 UTC−03:00		Report		Stadium: Estádio Maria Lamas Farache (Frasqueirão); Attendance: 11,641; Referee: João Bosco Sátiro da Nobrega (Paraíba)

April 6	Vasco da Gama (Rio de Janeiro (state))	2–1	(Rio Grande do Norte) ABC	Rio de Janeiro
21:50 UTC−03:00	Alecsandro 52' (pen.); Bernardo 78'	Report	Cascata 18'	Stadium: Estádio Vasco da Gama (São Januário); Attendance: 18,009; Referee: Emerson de Almeida Ferreira (Minas Gerais)

Vasco da Gama advanced on points 4–1.

=== Group 42 ===
March 16	Bangu (Rio de Janeiro (state))	0–2	(Pernambuco) Náutico	Rio de Janeiro
21:50 UTC−03:00		Report	Eduardo Ramos 49', 90'	Stadium: Estádio Proletário Guilherme da Silveira (Moça Bonita); Attendance: 136; Referee: Cleber Welington Abade (São Paulo)

Náutico advanced because they won by at least two goals as the visiting team in the first game.

=== Group 43 ===
March 16	Paulista (São Paulo (state))	0–2	(Paraná (state)) Atlético Paranaense	Jundiaí
19:30 UTC−03:00		Report	Nieto 25', 62'	Stadium: Estádio Dr. Jayme Pinheiro de Ulhoa Cintra; Attendance: 3,474; Referee: Felipe Gomes da Silva (Rio de Janeiro)

Atlético Paranaense advanced because they won by at least two goals as the visiting team in the first game.

=== Group 44 ===
March 30	Paysandu (Pará)	0–0	Bahia	Belém
21:50 UTC−03:00		Report		Stadium: Estádio Olímpico do Pará; Attendance: 14,637; Referee: Sandro Meira Ricci (Distrito Federal)

April 6	Bahia	2–1	(Pará) Paysandu	Salvador
21:50 UTC−03:00	Souza 31' (pen.), 41'	Report	Zé Augusto 55'	Stadium: Estádio Metropolitano Roberto Santos (Pituaçu); Attendance: 15,301; Referee: Luiz Flávio de Oliveira (São Paulo)

Bahia advance on points 4–1.

=== Group 45 ===
March 30	Paraná (Paraná (state))	1–2	(Rio de Janeiro (state)) Botafogo	Curitiba
19:30 UTC−03:00	Rodrigo Defendi 16'	Report	Antônio Carlos 15'; Willian 47'	Stadium: Estádio Durival Britto e Silva (Vila Capanema); Attendance: 4,490; Referee: Elmo Alves Resende Cunha (Goiás)

April 6	Botafogo (Rio de Janeiro (state))	3–0	(Paraná (state)) Paraná	Rio de Janeiro
21:50 UTC−03:00	Abreu 29', 54'; Caio 88' (pen.)	Report		Stadium: Estádio Olímpico João Havelange (Engenhão); Attendance: 6,014; Referee: Cleber Wellington Abade (São Paulo)

Botafogo advanced on points 6–0.

=== Group 46 ===
March 16	Ipatinga (Minas Gerais)	1–1	(Santa Catarina (state)) Avaí	Ipatinga
21:00 UTC−03:00	Pedro Paulo 52'	Report	Rafael Coelho 88'	Stadium: Estádio Municipal Epaminondas Mendes Brito (Ipatingão); Attendance: 1,280; Referee: Guilherme Cereta de Lima (São Paulo)

March 30	Avaí (Santa Catarina (state))	4–1	(Minas Gerais) Ipatinga	Florianópolis
21:50 UTC−03:00	Rafael Coelho 13', 34', 71'; Acleisson 64'	Report	Julinho 3' (o.g)	Stadium: Estádio Aderbal Ramos da Silva (Ressacada); Attendance: 4,148; Referee: Márcio Cristiano Brum Coruja (Rio Grande do Sul)

=== Group 47 ===
March 30	Santa Cruz (Pernambuco)	1–0	(São Paulo (state)) São Paulo	Recife
21:50 UTC−03:00	Rodrigo Souto 34' (o.g.)	Report		Stadium: Estádio José do Rego Maciel (Arruda); Attendance: 46,681; Referee: Marielson Alves Silva (Bahia)

April 6	São Paulo (São Paulo (state))	2–0	(Pernambuco) Santa Cruz	Barueri
21:50 UTC−03:00	Rhodolfo 9'; Ilsinho 72'	Report		Stadium: Arena Barueri; Attendance: 21,066; Referee: Gutemberg de Paula Fonseca (Rio de Janeiro)

Tied on points, São Paulo advanced on better goal difference.

=== Group 48 ===
March 31	Ponte Preta (São Paulo (state))	0–3	Goiás	Campinas
19:30 UTC−03:00		Report	Guto 10', 31'; Felipe Amorim 47'	Stadium: Estádio Moisés Lucarelli; Attendance: 3,085; Referee: Paulo Henrique de Godoy Bezerra (Santa Catarina)

Goiás advanced because they won by at least two goals as the visiting team in the first game.

== Round of 16 ==
The Round of 16 began on April 13 and ended on April 27.

=== Group 49 ===
April 20	Flamengo (Rio de Janeiro (state))	1–1	(Ceará) Horizonte	Rio de Janeiro
21:50 UTC−03:00	Wanderley 17'	Report	Elanardo 39' (pen.)	Stadium: Estádio Olímpico João Havelange (Engenhão); Attendance: 9,029; Referee: Wagner Reway (Mato Grosso)

April 27	Horizonte (Ceará)	0–3	(Rio de Janeiro (state)) Flamengo	Horizonte
21:50 UTC−03:00		Report	Rafael Galhardo 9'; Deivid 48'; Willians 81'	Stadium: Estádio Olímpico Horácio Domingos de Sousa (Domingão); Attendance: 5,058; Referee: Heber Roberto Lopes (Paraná)

Flamengo advanced on points 4–1.

=== Group 50 ===
April 21	Ceará	2–1	(São Paulo (state)) Grêmio Prudente	Horizonte
21:00 UTC−03:00	Geraldo 56' (pen.); Washington 89'	Report	Alceu 83'	Stadium: Estádio Olímpico Horácio Domingos de Sousa (Domingão); Attendance: 7,626; Referee: Claudio Mercante (Pernambuco)

April 27	Grêmio Prudente (São Paulo (state))	1–2	Ceará	Presidente Prudente
19:30 UTC−03:00	Eraldo 44'	Report	Iarley 1'; João Marcos 24'	Stadium: Estádio Eduardo José Farah (Prudentão); Attendance: 4,282; Referee: Marcos Mateus Pereira (Mato Grosso do Sul)

Ceará advanced on points 6–0.

=== Group 51 ===
April 14	Cortiba (Paraná (state))	4–0	(Rio Grande do Sul) Caxias	Curitiba
20:30 UTC−03:00	Davi 21'; Bill 43', 78'; Rafinha 51'	Report		Stadium: Estádio Major Antônio Couto Pereira; Attendance: 12,677; Referee: Antônio Frederico de Carvalho Schneider (Rio de Janeiro)

April 28	Caxias (Rio Grande do Sul)	0–1	(Paraná (state)) Coritiba	Caxias do Sul
19:30 UTC−03:00		Report	Émerson 72'	Stadium: Estádio Francisco Stédile (Centenário); Attendance: 2,485; Referee: Jefferson Schmidt (Santa Catarina)

Coritiba advanced on points 6–0.

=== Group 52 ===
April 13	Santo André (São Paulo (state))	1–2	(São Paulo (state)) Palmeiras	Santo André
21:50 UTC−03:00	Anderson 87'	Report	Kleber 22', 69'	Stadium: Estádio Bruno José Daniel; Attendance: 7,039; Referee: Guilherme Ceretta da Lima (São Paulo)

April 21	Palmeiras (São Paulo (state))	1–0	(São Paulo (state)) Santo André	São Paulo
16:00 UTC−03:00	Danilo 77'	Report		Stadium: Estádio Municipal Paulo Machado de Carvalho (Pacaembu); Attendance: 33,614; Referee: Raphael Claus (São Paulo)

Palmeiras advanced on points 6–0.

=== Group 53 ===
April 13	Náutico (Pernambuco)	0–3	(Rio de Janeiro (state)) Vasco da Gama	Recife
21:50 UTC−03:00		Report	Dedé 32'; Alecsandro 51'; Bernardo 90+2'	Stadium: Estádio Eládio de Barros Carvalho (Aflitos); Attendance: 12,244; Referee: Celio Amorim (Santa Catarina)

April 27	Vasco da Gama (Rio de Janeiro (state))	0–0	(Pernambuco) Náutico	Rio de Janeiro
21:50 UTC−03:00		Report		Stadium: Estádio São Januário; Attendance: 5,557; Referee: Devarly Lira do Rosario (Espírito Santo)

Vasco da Gama advanced on points 4–1.

=== Group 54 ===
April 13	Bahia	1–1	(Paraná (state)) Atlético Paranaense	Salvador
21:50 UTC−03:00	Camacho 84'	Report	Guerrón 45'	Stadium: Estádio Metropolitano Roberto Santos (Pituaçu); Attendance: 12,574; Referee: Sálvio Spinola Fagundes Filho (São Paulo)

April 20	Atlético Paranaense (Paraná (state))	5–0	Bahia	Curitiba
21:50 UTC−03:00	Paulo Baier 22', 40' (pen.); Manoel 25'; Rafael Santos 34'; Adaílton 50'	Report		Stadium: Arena da Baixada; Attendance: 14,037; Referee: Marcio Chagas da Silva (Rio Grande do Sul)

Atlético Paranaense advanced on points 4–1.

=== Group 55 ===
April 13	Botafogo (Rio de Janeiro (state))	2–2	(Santa Catarina (state)) Avaí	Rio de Janeiro
19:30 UTC−03:00	Herrera 23'; Abreu 44'	Report	William 13'; Rafael Coelho 21'	Stadium: Estádio Olímpico João Havelange (Engenhão); Attendance: 5,574; Referee: Fabricío Neves Corrêa (Rio Grande do Sul)

April 20	Avaí (Santa Catarina (state))	1–1	(Rio de Janeiro (state)) Botafogo	Florianópolis
19:30 UTC−03:00	William 88' (pen.)	Report	Abreu 72'	Stadium: Estádio Aderbal Ramos da Silva (Ressacada); Attendance: 7,209; Referee: Ricardo Marques Ribeiro (Minas Gerais)

Tied 2–2 on points, Avaí advanced on away goals.

=== Group 56 ===
April 20	Goiás	0–1	(São Paulo (state)) São Paulo	Goiânia
21:50 UTC−03:00		Report	Dagoberto 47'	Stadium: Estádio Serra Dourada; Attendance: 28,526; Referee: Marcos André Gomes de Penha (Espírito Santo)

April 27	São Paulo (São Paulo (state))	1–0	Goiás	São Paulo
21:50 UTC−03:00	Dagoberto 19'	Report		Stadium: Estádio Cícero Pompeu de Toledo (Morumbi); Attendance: 34,544; Referee: Marcelo de Lima Henrique (Rio de Janeiro)

São Paulo advanced on points 6–0.

== Quarterfinals ==
The Quarterfinals began on May 4 and ended on May 12.

=== Group 57 ===
May 5, 2011	Flamengo (Rio de Janeiro (state))	1–2	Ceará	Rio de Janeiro
21:50 UTC−03:00	Wanderley 75'	Report	Marcelo Nicácio 43'; Geraldo 66'	Stadium: Estádio Olímpico João Havelange (Engenhão); Attendance: 17,127; Referee: Marcos André Gomes de Penha (Espírito Santo)

May 11, 2011	Ceará	2–2	(Rio de Janeiro (state)) Flamengo	Fortaleza
21:50 UTC−03:00	Washington 35', 41'	Report	Thiago Neves 19', 27'	Stadium: Estádio Presidente Vargas; Attendance: 12,936; Referee: Sandro Meira Ricci (Distrito Federal)

Ceará advanced on points 4–1.

=== Group 58 ===
May 5, 2011	Coritiba (Paraná (state))	6–0	(São Paulo (state)) Palmeiras	Curitiba
19:30 UTC−03:00	Émerson 11'; Davi 22'; Léo Gago 43'; Bill 56'; Geraldo 90'; Anderson Aquino 90+2'	Report		Stadium: Estádio Major Antônio Couto Pereira; Attendance: 28,870; Referee: Leandro Pedro Vuaden (Rio Grande do Sul)

May 11, 2011	Palmeiras (São Paulo (state))	2–0	(Paraná (state)) Coritiba	São Paulo
21:50 UTC−03:00	Émerson 46' (o.g.); Marcos Assunção 65'	Report		Stadium: Estádio Municipal Paulo Machado de Carvalho (Pacaembu); Attendance: 6,541; Referee: Nielson Nogueira Dias (Pernambuco)

Tied on points 3–3, Coritiba advanced on better goal difference.

=== Group 59 ===
May 4, 2011	Atlético Paranaense (Paraná (state))	2–2	(Rio de Janeiro (state)) Vasco da Gama	Curitiba
21:50 UTC−03:00	Guerrón 51'; Paulo Baier 88' (pen.)	Report	Alecsandro 36'; Diego Souza 73'	Stadium: Estádio Joaquim Américo Guimarães (Arena de Baixada); Attendance: 15,969; Referee: Wilton Pereira Sampaio (Distrito Federal)

May 12, 2011	Vasco da Gama (Rio de Janeiro (state))	1–1	(Paraná (state)) Atlético Paranaense	Rio de Janeiro
19:30 UTC−03:00	Élton 79'	Report	Nieto 73'	Stadium: Estádio São Januário; Attendance: 21,206; Referee: Elmo Alves Resende Cunha (Goiás)

Tied on points 2–2, Vasco da Gama advanced on away goals.

=== Group 60 ===
May 4, 2011	São Paulo (São Paulo (state))	1–0	(Santa Catarina (state)) Avaí	São Paulo
21:50 UTC−03:00	Revson 48' (o.g.)	Report		Stadium: Estádio Cícero Pompeu de Toledo (Morumbi); Attendance: 20,815; Referee: André Luiz de Freitas Castro (Goiás)

May 12, 2011	Avaí (Santa Catarina (state))	3–1	(São Paulo (state)) São Paulo	Florianópolis
21:50 UTC−03:00	William 17'; Bruno Silva 31'; Marquinhos 46'	Report	Casimiro 16'	Stadium: Estádio Aderbal Ramos da Silva (Ressacada); Attendance: 12,956; Referee: Marcio Chagas da Silva (Rio Grande do Sul)

Tied on points 3–3, Avaí advanced on better goal difference.

== Semifinals ==
The Semifinals began on May 18 and ended on May 25.

=== Group 61 ===
May 18, 2011	Ceará	0–0	(Paraná (state)) Coritiba	Fortaleza
21:50 UTC−03:00		Report		Stadium: Estádio Presidente Vargas; Attendance: 12,101; Referee: Leandro Pedro Vuaden (Rio Grande do Sul)

May 25, 2011	Coritiba (Paraná (state))	1–0	Ceará	Curitiba
21:50 UTC−03:00	Anderson Aquino 50'	Report		Stadium: Estádio Major Antônio Couto Pereira; Attendance: 27,317; Referee: Wilson Luiz Seneme (São Paulo)

Coritiba advanced on points 4–1.

=== Group 62 ===
May 18, 2011	Vasco da Gama (Rio de Janeiro (state))	1–1	(Santa Catarina (state)) Avaí	Rio de Janeiro
21:50 UTC−03:00	Diego Souza 90+3'	Report	Julinho 80'	Stadium: Estádio São Januário; Attendance: 19,136; Referee: Wilson Luiz Seneme (São Paulo)

May 25, 2011	Avaí (Santa Catarina (state))	0–2	(Rio de Janeiro (state)) Vasco da Gama	Florianópolis
21:50 UTC−03:00		Report	Revson 4' (o.g.); Diego Souza 35'	Stadium: Estádio Aderbal Ramos da Silva (Ressacada); Attendance: 15,868; Referee: Leandro Pedro Vuaden (Rio Grande do Sul)

Vasco da Gama advanced on points 4–1.

== Finals ==
The Finals was played on June 1 and June 8.

=== Group 63 ===
June 1, 2011
21:50 UTC−03:00

Vasco da Gama (Rio de Janeiro (state))	1–0	(Paraná (state)) Coritiba
Alecsandro 50'	Report

Estádio São Januário, Rio de Janeiro
Attendance: 21,365
Referee: Paulo César de Oliveira (São Paulo)

June 8, 2011
21:50 UTC−03:00

Coritiba (Paraná (state))	3–2	(Rio de Janeiro (state)) Vasco da Gama
Bill 29'; Davi 44'; Willian Farias 66'	Report	Alecsandro 12'; Éder Luís 57'

Estádio Major Antônio Couto Pereira, Curitiba
Attendance: 31,516
Referee: Sálvio Fagundes (São Paulo)

Tied on points 3–3, Vasco da Gama won on away goals.

Copa do Brasil
2011 champion

1st title

== Top goalscorers ==
Rank	Player	Club	Goals
1	(Brazil) Adriano	Palmeiras	5
1	(Brazil) Alecsandro	Vasco da Gama	5
1	(Brazil) Kléber	Palmeiras	5
1	(Brazil) Rafael Coelho	Avaí	5
1	(Brazil) William	Avaí	5
