= 2010 Campeonato Brasileiro Série D =

Campeonato Brasileiro de Clubes da Série D
- Season: 2010
- Champions: Guarany de Sobral
- Promoted: Madureira; Araguaína; Guarany de Sobral; Joinville
- Matches: 164
- Goals: 436 (2.66 per match)
- Top goalscorer: 11 goals: Danilo Pitbull
- Biggest home win: Uberaba 6-1 Rio Branco (ES) (August 14, 2010)
- Biggest away win: Camaçari 1-3 Uberaba (August 01, 2010)
- Highest scoring: 8 goals: Madureira 6-2 Operário (PR) (October 16, 2010)
- Longest winning run: 5 games: CSA (July 18-August 22); Mixto (July 25-September 05)
- Longest unbeaten run: 9 games: Araguaína (August 22-October 30); Guarany de Sobral (September 12-November 14)
- Longest losing run: 6 games: Potiguar de Mossoró (July 18-August 22)
- Highest attendance: 50.897: Santa Cruz 4-3 Guarany de Sobral (September 05, 2010)
- Lowest attendance: 11: Marcílio Dias 0-0 Iraty (August 08, 2010)
- Average attendance: 2.780

The Campeonato Brasileiro Série D 2010 fue la segunda edición del Campeonato Brasileño de Serie D. The competition has 40 clubs, four of which will eventually ascendieron to the Campeonato Brasileiro Série C de 2011.

== Competition format ==
The 40 teams are divided in ten groups of 4, playing within them in a double round-robin format. The two best ranked in each group at the end of 6 rounds will qualify to the Second Stage, which will be played in home-and-away system. Winners advance to Third Stage along with the three losers with best record in previous stages. The Quarter-Final winners will be promoted to the Série C 2011. As there is no Série E, or Fifth Division, technically there will be no relegation. However, teams who were not promoted will have to re-qualify for Série D 2011 through their respective state leagues.

== Participating teams ==
State	Team	City	Qualification criteria
São Paulo	Botafogo-SP	Ribeirão Preto	Best record in 2010 State Championship
São Paulo	Oeste	Itápolis	2nd best record in 2010 State Championship
Rio de Janeiro	América-RJ	Rio de Janeiro	Best record in 2010 State Championship
Rio de Janeiro	Madureira	Rio de Janeiro	2009 Copa Rio Runner-up
Rio Grande do Sul	São José	Porto Alegre	Best record in 2010 State Championship
Rio Grande do Sul	Pelotas^{1}	Pelotas	3rd best record in 2010 State Championship
Minas Gerais	Tupi^{2}	Juiz de Fora	3rd best record in 2010 State Championship
Minas Gerais	Uberaba^{2}	Uberaba	5th best record in 2010 State Championship
Paraná	Iraty	Irati	Best record in 2010 State Championship
Paraná	Operário Ferroviário	Ponta Grossa	2nd Best Record in 2010 State Championship
Pernambuco	Santa Cruz	Recife	Best record in 2010 State Championship
Pernambuco	Central	Caruaru	2nd best record in 2010 State Championship
Bahia	Camaçari	Camaçari	Best record in 2010 State Championship
Bahia	Fluminense de Feira	Feira de Santana	2009 Copa Governador do Estado Champion
Goiás	No representative^{3}
Goiás	No representative^{3}
Santa Catarina	Joinville	Joinville	Best record in 2010 State Championship
Santa Catarina	Metropolitano	Blumenau	2009 Copa Santa Catarina Runner-up
Santa Catarina	Marcílio Dias	Itajaí	2009 Série C Relegated
Ceará	Guarany de Sobral	Sobral	Best record in 2010 State Championship
Pará	Remo	Belém	Best record in 2010 State Championship
Pará	Cametá^{4}	Cametá	4th Best record in 2010 State Championship
Rio Grande do Norte	Potiguar^{5}	Mossoró	5th best record in 2010 State Championship
Alagoas	CSA^{8}	Maceió	2010 Second Division State Championship Champion
Distrito Federal	Ceilândia	Ceilândia	2010 State Championship Champion
Distrito Federal	Botafogo-DF^{3}	Guará	3rd Best record in 2010 State Championship
Distrito Federal	Brasília^{3}	Ceilândia	6th Best record in 2010 State Championship
Espírito Santo	Rio Branco-ES	Cariacica	2010 State Championship Champion
Maranhão	JV Lideral	Imperatriz	2009 State Championship Champion
Maranhão	Sampaio Corrêa	São Luís	2009 Série C Relegated
Paraíba	Treze	Campina Grande	Best record in 2010 State Championship
Mato Grosso do Sul	CENE	Campo Grande	2010 Copa Governador André Pucinelli Champion
Amazonas	América-AM^{6}	Manaus	2009 State Championship Champion
Sergipe	River Plate-SE	Carmópolis	2010 State Championship Champion
Sergipe	Confiança	Aracaju	2009 Série C Relegated
Piauí	Flamengo do Piauí	Teresina	2009 Copa Piauí Champion
Mato Grosso	Vila Aurora	Rondonópolis	2009 Copa Governador de Mato Grosso Champion
Mato Grosso	Mixto	Cuiabá	2009 Série C Relegated
Acre	Náuas	Cruzeiro do Sul	Best record in 2010 State Championship
Rondônia	Vilhena	Vilhena	2010 State Championship Runners-up
Tocantins	Araguaína	Araguaína	2009 State Championship Champion
Amapá	Cristal^{7}	Macapá	2009 State Championship Runner-up
Roraima	No representative^{4}

- ^{1} The second best team, Veranópolis withdrew.
- ^{2} Both the second best team, Democrata-GV, and the fourth best team, Villa Nova withdrew.
- ^{3} All Goiás-based teams withdrew. Since Goiás clubs were already allocated in Group 6, the entries were passed on to Distrito Federal, also on Group 6, and better placed on CBF's Ranking, ahead of Tocantins, also on Group 6.
- ^{4} All Roraima-based teams withdrew. Since Roraima clube were already allocated in Group 1, the entry passed on to Pará, better placed on CBF's Ranking.
- ^{5} The second best team Corintians de Caicó and the fourth best team Santa Cruz (RN) withdrew.
- ^{6} Briefly known as Manaos
- ^{7} Santana withdrew.
- ^{8} Murici and all the other Alagoas State Championship First Division teams withdrew due to the floodings

== Results ==
=== First stage ===
==== Group 1 ====
Team	Pld	W	D	L	GF	GA	GD	Pts
(Pará) Remo	6	3	2	1	9	5	4	11
(Amazonas (Brazilian state)) América (AM)	6	2	3	1	9	7	2	9
(Pará) Cametá	6	2	2	2	10	8	2	8
(Amapá) Cristal	6	1	1	4	4	12	-8	4

	AMN	CMT	CRS	REM
América (AM)	-	0-0	3-1	1-1
Cametá	3-3	—	2-0	3-1
Cristal	1-2	2-1	-	0-0
Remo	1-0	2-1	4-0	-

==== Group 2 ====
Team	Pld	W	D	L	GF	GA	GD	Pts
(Mato Grosso) Mixto	6	5	1	0	13	4	9	16
(Mato Grosso) Vila Aurora	6	3	2	1	8	5	3	11
(Rondônia) Vilhena	6	2	0	4	6	6	0	6
(Acre (state)) Náuas	6	0	1	5	3	15	-12	1

	MIX	NAS	VAU	VLH
Mixto	—	5-1	1-1	1-0
Náuas	0-2	—	0-1	0-2
Vila Aurora	1-2	2-2	—	2-0
Vilhena	1-2	3-0^{WO}	0-1	—

==== Group 3 ====
Team	Pld	W	D	L	GF	GA	GD	Pts
(Ceará) Guarany de Sobral	6	2	3	1	13	7	6	9
(Maranhão) Sampaio Corrêa	6	2	3	1	9	5	4	9
(Maranhão) JV Lideral	6	2	3	1	6	6	0	9
(Piauí) Flamengo (PI)	6	0	3	3	4	14	-10	3

	FLM	GNY	JVL	SCO
Flamengo (PI)	—	2-2	1-1	0-1
Guarany de Sobral	5-0	—	4-0	0-0
JV Lideral	0-0	3-0	—	0-0
Sampaio Corrêa	5-1	2-2	1-2	—

==== Group 4 ====
Team	Pld	W	D	L	GF	GA	GD	Pts
(Alagoas) CSA	6	5	0	1	13	7	6	15
(Pernambuco) Santa Cruz	6	3	2	1	6	3	3	11
(Sergipe) Confiança	6	2	2	2	6	6	0	8
(Rio Grande do Norte) Potiguar de Mossoró	6	0	0	6	3	12	-9	0

	CON	CSA	POT	SCR
Confiança	—	1-2	1-0	1-1
CSA	3-1	—	2-0	1-2
Potiguar de Mossoró	0-2	3-4	—	0-1
Santa Cruz	0-0	0-1	2-0	—

==== Group 5 ====
Team	Pld	W	D	L	GF	GA	GD	Pts
(Paraíba) Treze	6	4	0	2	9	6	3	12
(Bahia) Fluminense de Feira	6	3	1	2	10	9	1	10
(Sergipe) River Plate (SE)	6	2	2	2	10	12	-2	8
(Pernambuco) Central	6	1	1	4	10	13	-3	4

	CTL	FLF	RVR	TRE
Central	—	0-1	5-2	0-1
Fluminense de Feira	2-1	—	2-3	3-2
River Plate (SE)	3-3	1-1	—	1-0
Treze	4-1	2-1	1-0	—

==== Group 6 ====
Team	Pld	W	D	L	GF	GA	GD	Pts
(Federal District (Brazil)) Brasília	6	2	3	1	7	6	1	9
(Tocantins) Araguaína	6	2	3	1	6	5	1	9
(Federal District (Brazil)) Ceilândia	6	2	2	2	7	7	0	8
(Federal District (Brazil)) Botafogo (DF)	6	0	4	2	4	6	-2	4

	ARA	BDF	BLI	CEI
Araguaína	—	1-0	1-1	2-1
Botafogo (DF)	0-0	-	0-0	1-1
Brasília	2-2	2-1	-	2-0
Ceilândia	1-0	2-2	2-0	—

==== Group 7 ====
Team	Pld	W	D	L	GF	GA	GD	Pts
(Minas Gerais) Uberaba	6	4	1	1	18	7	11	13
(Espírito Santo) Rio Branco (ES)	6	3	1	2	14	12	2	10
(Rio de Janeiro (state)) América (RJ)	6	3	1	2	11	12	-1	10
(Bahia) Camaçari	6	0	1	5	4	16	-12	1

	AME	CMÇ	RBC	UBR
América (RJ)	—	2-1	3-2	1-1
Camaçari	0-2	—	1-1	1-3
Rio Branco (ES)	4-1	4-1	—	2-0
Uberaba	4-2	4-0	6-1	—

==== Group 8 ====
Team	Pld	W	D	L	GF	GA	GD	Pts
(Rio de Janeiro (state)) Madureira	6	3	1	2	9	11	-2	10
(Minas Gerais) Tupi	6	2	3	1	7	4	3	9
(Mato Grosso do Sul) CENE	6	2	3	1	8	6	2	9
(São Paulo (state)) Botafogo-RP	6	1	1	4	5	9	-3	4

	BRP	CEN	MAD	TUP
Botafogo-RP	—	0-1	0-1	1-1
CENE	0-1	—	4-2	1-1
Madureira	4-3	1-1	—	1-0
Tupi	1-0	1-1	3-0	—

==== Group 9 ====
Team	Pld	W	D	L	GF	GA	GD	Pts
(Santa Catarina (state)) Joinville	6	3	2	1	7	4	3	11
(Paraná (state)) Operário (PR)	6	3	1	2	3	3	0	10
(Rio Grande do Sul) São José	6	2	1	3	6	6	0	7
(São Paulo (state)) Oeste	6	1	2	3	3	6	-3	5

	JEC	OES	OPE	SJS
Joinville	—	2-1	2-0	2-1
Oeste	0-0	—	0-0	1-0
Operário (PR)	1-0	1-0	—	1-0
São José	1-1	3-1	1−0	—

==== Group 10 ====
Team	Pld	W	D	L	GF	GA	GD	Pts
(Santa Catarina (state)) Metropolitano	6	3	2	1	9	5	4	11
(Paraná (state)) Iraty	6	2	3	1	8	8	0	9
(Rio Grande do Sul) Pelotas	6	2	2	2	9	6	3	8
(Santa Catarina (state)) Marcílio Dias	6	0	3	3	2	9	-7	3

	IRT	MCD	MTP	PEL
Iraty	—	1-0	3-3	2-1
Marcílio Dias	0-0	—	0-2	1-1
Metropolitano	2-0	1-1	—	1-0
Pelotas	2-2	4-0	1-0	—

=== Second stage ===
First leg played on September 4 and 05; Second leg played on September 11 and 12.

Team 1	Agg.	Team 2	1st leg	2nd leg
Remo (Pará)	1-1 (a)	(Mato Grosso) Vila Aurora	0-0	1-1
Mixto (Mato Grosso)	5-5 (a)	(Amazonas (Brazilian state)) América (AM)	1-3	4-2
Guarany de Sobral (Ceará)	5-4	(Pernambuco) Santa Cruz	3-4	2-0
CSA (Alagoas)	2-7	(Maranhão) Sampaio Corrêa	0-5	2-2
Treze (Paraíba)	3-3 (a)	(Tocantins) Araguaína	1-1	2-2
Brasília (Federal District (Brazil))	3-1	(Bahia) Fluminense de Feira	0-1	3-0
Uberaba (Minas Gerais)	4-2	(Minas Gerais) Tupi	2-2	2-0
Madureira (Rio de Janeiro (state))	3-2	(Espírito Santo) Rio Branco (ES)	1-1	2-1
Joinville (Santa Catarina (state))	4-0	(Paraná (state)) Iraty	2-0	2-0
Metropolitano (Santa Catarina (state))	2-4	(Paraná (state)) Operário (PR)	0-1	2-3

Teams in the left column played second match at home.

=== Third stage ===
First leg played on September 25 and 26; Second leg played on October 2.

Team 1	Agg.	Team 2	1st leg	2nd leg
Vila Aurora (Mato Grosso)	3-1	(Amazonas (Brazilian state)) América (AM)	0-1	3-0
Sampaio Corrêa (Maranhão)	3-4	(Ceará) Guarany de Sobral	2-3	1-1
Brasília (Federal District (Brazil))	4-6	(Tocantins) Araguaína	3-4	1-2
Madureira (Rio de Janeiro (state))	3-1	(Minas Gerais) Uberaba	3-1	0-0
Operário (PR) (Paraná (state))	0-1	(Santa Catarina (state)) Joinville	0-0	0-1

Teams in the left column played second match at home.

Three of the five 3rd stage losers qualify due to their overall record:
Qualification After 3rd Stage Matchday 02, October 2

Team	Pld	W	D	L	GF	GA	GD	Pts
(Santa Catarina (state)) Joinville	10	6	3	1	12	4	8	21
(Rio de Janeiro (state)) Madureira	10	5	3	2	15	14	1	18
(Tocantins) Araguaína	10	4	5	1	15	12	3	17
(Ceará) Guarany de Sobral	10	4	4	2	22	14	8	16
(Mato Grosso) Vila Aurora	10	4	4	2	13	8	5	16
(Minas Gerais) Uberaba	10	5	3	2	23	12	11	18
(Paraná (state)) Operário (PR)	10	5	2	3	7	6	1	17
(Amazonas (Brazilian state)) América (AM)	10	4	3	3	15	15	0	15
(Maranhão) Sampaio Corrêa	10	3	5	2	15	10	5	14
(Federal District (Brazil)) Brasília	10	3	3	4	14	13	1	12

=== Bracket ===
Quarterfinals
W1	(Santa Catarina (state)) Joinville	1	1
L3	(Amazonas (Brazilian state)) América (AM)	2	1
W2	(Rio de Janeiro (state)) Madureira	4	6
L2	(Paraná (state)) Operário (PR)	2	2
W3	(Tocantins) Araguaína (p)	0	0
L1	(Minas Gerais) Uberaba	0	0
W4	(Ceará) Guarany de Sobral	2	2
W5	(Mato Grosso) Vila Aurora	0	1

Semifinals
(Amazonas (Brazilian state)) América (AM)	1	2
(Rio de Janeiro (state)) Madureira	2	0
(Tocantins) Araguaína	2	0
(Ceará) Guarany de Sobral (a)	2	0

Finals
(Amazonas (Brazilian state)) América (AM)	1	1
(Ceará) Guarany de Sobral	1	4

(p) won on penalty shootout.
(a) won by away goals rule.

=== Quarter-finals ===
First leg played on October 10; Second leg played on October 16 and 17.

Team 1	Agg.	Team 2	1st leg	2nd leg
Joinville (Santa Catarina (state))	2-3	(Amazonas (Brazilian state)) América (AM)	1-2	1-1
Madureira (Rio de Janeiro (state))	10-4	(Paraná (state)) Operário (PR)	4-2	6-2
Araguaína (Tocantins)	0-0 (p 3-2)	(Minas Gerais) Uberaba	0-0	0-0
Guarany de Sobral (Ceará)	4-1	(Mato Grosso) Vila Aurora	2-0	2-1

Teams in the left column played second match at home.

=== Semifinals ===
First leg played on October 23 and 24; Second leg played on October 27 and 30.

Team 1	Agg.	Team 2	1st leg	2nd leg
Madureira (Rio de Janeiro (state))	2-3	(Amazonas (Brazilian state)) América (AM)	2-1	0-2
Guarany de Sobral (Ceará)	2-2 (a)	(Tocantins) Araguaína	2-2	0-0

Teams in the left column played second match at home.

=== Finals ===
All times Brazilian Daylight Saving Time

7 November 2010
18:00

América (AM) (Amazonas (Brazilian state))	1 – 1	(Ceará) Guarany de Sobral
Edinho 14'	Report	Wanderley 10'

Estádio Colosso do Tapajós, Santarém^{1}
Attendance: 668
Referee: Fernando Rodrigues
- ^{1} Since América's stadium, SESI, doesn't have the minimum attendance capacity, the game was transferred from Amazonas to Pará

14 November 2010
18:00

Guarany de Sobral (Ceará)	4 – 1	(Amazonas (Brazilian state)) América (AM)
Danilo Pitbull 25'; Júnior Alves 31'; Wanderley 56'; Jhony 62'	Report	Clailson 49'

Estádio do Junco, Sobral
Referee: Afonso Amorim de Souza

Guarany de Sobral won 5–2 on aggregate.

América (AM) was judged not guilty on November 5 by the STJD, accused of fielding an out-of-contract player in the Quarterfinals against Joinville. If found guilty, the club would have been disqualified from the Série D, losing its promotion, which would then by awarded to Joinville. The Semifinals should be then replayed, this time facing Madureira and Joinville. The club will now be judged again, accused of fielding a suspended player in the Second Leg of the Semifinals against Madureira.
On November 12, América (AM) was declared guilty of fielding a suspender player. However, later on the same day, the club achieved to suspend the decision.
Finally, on December 9, the STJD decided to punish América (AM) with the loss of 6 points due to fielding an out-of-contract player. América (AM), that way, loses its promoting, that being awarded to Joinville.

2010 Campeonato Brasileiro Série D Winners
Guarany de Sobral
1st Title

== Final standings ==
Team	Pld	W	D	L	GF	GA	GD	Pts
(Ceará) Guarany de Sobral (P) (C)	16	7	7	2	33	19	14	28
(Rio de Janeiro (state)) Madureira (P)	14	8	3	3	27	21	6	27
(Tocantins) Araguaína (P)	14	4	9	1	17	14	3	21
(Santa Catarina (state)) Joinville (P)	12	6	4	2	14	7	7	22
(Minas Gerais) Uberaba	12	5	5	2	23	12	11	20
(Paraná (state)) Operário (PR)	12	5	2	5	11	16	-5	17
(Mato Grosso) Vila Aurora	12	4	4	4	14	12	2	16
(Amazonas (Brazilian state)) América (AM)	16	6	5	5	23	24	-1	13
(Maranhão) Sampaio Corrêa	10	3	5	2	15	10	5	14
(Federal District (Brazil)) Brasília	10	3	3	4	14	13	1	12
(Mato Grosso) Mixto	8	6	1	1	18	9	9	19
(Alagoas) CSA	8	5	1	2	15	14	1	16
(Paraíba) Treze	8	4	2	2	12	9	3	14
(Pernambuco) Santa Cruz	8	4	2	2	10	8	2	14
(Bahia) Fluminense de Feira	8	4	1	3	11	12	-1	13
(Pará) Remo	8	3	4	1	10	6	4	13
(Santa Catarina (state)) Metropolitano	8	3	2	3	11	9	2	11
(Espírito Santo) Rio Branco (ES)	8	3	2	3	16	15	1	11
(Minas Gerais) Tupi	8	2	4	2	9	8	1	10
(Paraná (state)) Iraty	8	2	3	3	8	12	-4	9
(Rio de Janeiro (state)) América (RJ)	6	3	1	2	11	12	-1	10
(Mato Grosso do Sul) CENE	6	2	3	1	8	6	2	9
(Maranhão) JV Lideral	6	2	3	1	6	6	0	9
(Rio Grande do Sul) Pelotas	6	2	2	2	9	6	3	8
(Pará) Cametá	6	2	2	2	10	8	2	8
(Federal District (Brazil)) Ceilândia	6	2	2	2	7	7	0	8
(Sergipe) Confiança	6	2	2	2	6	6	0	8
(Sergipe) River Plate (SE)	6	2	2	2	10	12	-2	8
(Rio Grande do Sul) São José	6	2	1	3	6	6	0	7
(Rondônia) Vilhena	6	2	0	4	6	6	0	6
(São Paulo (state)) Oeste	6	1	2	3	3	6	-3	5
(Pernambuco) Central	6	1	1	4	10	13	-3	4
(São Paulo (state)) Botafogo-RP	6	1	1	4	5	9	-3	4
(Amapá) Cristal	6	1	1	4	4	12	-8	4
(Federal District (Brazil)) Botafogo (DF)	6	0	4	2	4	6	-2	4
(Santa Catarina (state)) Marcílio Dias	6	0	3	3	2	9	-7	3
(Piauí) Flamengo (PI)	6	0	3	3	4	14	-10	3
(Bahia) Camaçari	6	0	1	5	4	16	-12	1
(Acre (state)) Náuas	6	0	1	5	3	15	-12	1
(Rio Grande do Norte) Potiguar de Mossoró	6	0	0	6	3	12	-9	0

== Top goalscorers ==
Pos	Name	Club	Goals
1	(Brazil) Danilo Pitbull	Guarany de Sobral	11
2	(Brazil) Patrick	Mixto	8
3	(Brazil) Charles	América (AM)	7
4	(Brazil) Célio Codó	Sampaio Corrêa	6
4	(Brazil) Dimba	Ceilândia	6
4	(Brazil) Maciel	Madureira	6
