= 2011 Campeonato Paranaense =

Campeonato Paranaense - 1ª Divisão
- Season: 2011
- Champions: Coritiba
- Relegated: Paraná; Cascavel
- Copa do Brasil: Coritiba; Atlético Paranaense; Operário
- Série D: Operário; Cianorte
- Matches: 30
- Goals: 76 (2.53 per match)
- Top goalscorer: Negreiros (4 goals)
- Biggest home win: Coritiba 5-0 Iraty (February 3 )
- Biggest away win: Cascavel 0-3 Iraty (January 30); Paranavaí 0-3 Coritiba (March 10); Cascavel 0-3 Coritiba (March 20)
- Highest scoring: Coritiba 6-2 Rio Branco-RR (April 2)
- Longest winning run: 14 games:Coritiba (February 03 - )
- Longest unbeaten run: 22 games: Coritiba (all games)
- Longest winless run: 13 games: Cascavel (February 6 - )
- Longest losing run: 6 game: Cascavel (February 27 -March 27 )
- Highest attendance: Coritiba 4-2 C.A. Paranaense (22,195) (February 20)
- Lowest attendance: Corinthians Paranaense 1-2 Rio Branco (181) (January 19)
- Average attendance: 3,130

The 2011 Campeonato Paranaense de Futebol Profissional da 1ª Divisão is the 96th season of Paraná's top professional football league. The competition began on January 16 and will end on May 15. Coritiba is the defending champion.

== Format ==
The tournament consists of a double round-robin format, in which all twelve teams play each other twice, with classification split in two stages. The first stage of the tournament started on January 16 and will end on February 27 and the second stage will start on March 5 and end on May 1. The better-placed teams of each stage will face themselves in a two-legged tie, with the team with the most points in the overall classification playing the second leg home, the winning team will then be declared champion. The finals are notable in the sense that goal difference will not be a tiebreaking criteria, if both teams tie on points the decision will go directly to a penalty shootout. If the same team is best-placed on both stages, it will automatically be declared champion.

The best two-placed teams in the overall classification not advancing to the finals and not from Curitiba will face themselves in a two-legged tie competing for the Torneio do Interior. The team with the most points will play the second leg home. The bottom two teams on overall classification will be relegated.

=== Qualifications ===
The best three teams not qualified to 2012 Copa Libertadores will qualify for 2012 Copa do Brasil. The best two teams not playing in Campeonato Brasileiro Série A, B or C will qualify for 2011 Campeonato Brasileiro Série D.

== Participating teams ==
Club	Home city	2010 result
Arapongas	Arapongas	2nd (2ª Divisão)
Atlético Paranaense	Curitiba	2nd
Cascavel	Cascavel	7th
Cianorte	Cianorte	9th
Corinthians Paranaense	Curitiba	8th
Coritiba	Curitiba	1st
Iraty	Irati	3rd
Operário	Ponta Grossa	5th
Paraná	Curitiba	4th
Paranavaí	Paranavaí	6th
Rio Branco	Paranaguá	10th
Roma Apucarana	Apucarana	1st (2ª Divisão)

== First stage ==
Pos	Team	Pld	W	D	L	GF	GA	GD	Pts	Qualification
1	Coritiba (A)	11	9	2	0	27	8	+19	29	Advances to the Finals and 2012 Copa do Brasil
2	Operário	11	7	1	3	17	10	+7	22	
3	Atlético Paranaense	11	7	0	4	25	18	+7	21	
4	Iraty	11	6	2	3	16	13	+3	20	
5	Arapongas	11	5	2	4	10	8	+2	17	
6	Cianorte	11	5	2	4	14	15	−1	17	
7	Corinthians Paranaense	11	5	0	6	12	15	−3	15	
8	Roma Apucarana	11	3	5	3	15	17	−2	14	
9	Paranavaí	11	3	2	6	14	18	−4	11	
10	Rio Branco-RR	11	2	3	6	12	20	−8	9	
11	Cascavel	11	1	3	7	8	17	−9	6	
12	Paraná	11	1	2	8	8	21	−13	5	

Updated to match(es) played on 27 February 2011. Source:
Rules for classification: 1st points; 2nd wins; 3rd goal difference; 4th goals scored; 5th red cards received; 6th yellow cards received; 7th public draw
(A) Advance to a further round

== Second stage ==
Pos	Team	Pld	W	D	L	GF	GA	GD	Pts	Qualification
1	Coritiba	11	11	0	0	35	9	+26	33	Champions (Note: Coritiba (first stage champions) win second stage so they will be declared champions)
2	Atlético Paranaense	11	8	1	2	21	14	+7	25	
3	Operário	11	5	3	3	0	0	0	18	
4	Paraná	11	5	3	3	18	17	+1	18	
5	Cianorte	11	5	2	4	18	11	+7	17	
6	Arapongas	11	5	2	4	19	17	+2	17	
7	Rio Branco-RR	11	4	3	4	12	20	−8	15	
8	Paranavaí	11	4	2	5	19	19	0	14	
9	Roma Apucarana	11	4	1	6	0	0	0	13	
10	Corinthians Paranaense	11	2	3	6	0	0	0	9	
11	Iraty	11	1	2	8	0	0	0	5	
12	Cascavel	11	0	2	9	0	0	0	2	

Updated to match(es) played on final standings. Source:
Rules for classification: 1st points; 2nd wins; 3rd goal difference; 4th goals scored; 5th red cards received; 6th yellow cards received; 7th public draw

=== Notable matches ===
Round 21: Atlético Paranaense vs. Coritiba

On penultimate matchday Atlético Paranaense will play against first stage champions and second stage leader Coritiba. Coritiba won this match and became champion prematurely.

Table of second stage after Round 20
Pos	Team	Pld	W	D	L	GF	GA	GD	Pts
1	Coritiba	9	9	0	0	30	9	+21	27
2	Atlético Paranaense	9	7	1	1	18	10	+8	22

March 22, 2011
16:00 UTC−03:00

Atlético Paranaense	0-3	Coritiba

Estádio Joaquim Américo Guimarães, Curitiba

== Overall classification ==
Pos	Team	Pld	W	D	L	GF	GA	GD	Pts	Qualification or relegation
1	Coritiba (C)	22	20	2	0	62	17	+45	62	2012 Copa do Brasil
2	Atlético Paranaense	22	15	1	6	46	32	+14	46	2012 Copa do Brasil
3	Operário	22	12	4	6	35	25	+10	40	Torneio do Interior and Série D and 2012 Copa do Brasil
4	Cianorte	22	10	4	8	33	25	+8	34	Torneio do Interior and Série D
5	Arapongas	22	10	4	8	29	25	+4	34	
6	Roma Apucarana	22	7	6	9	32	40	−8	27	
7	Paranavaí	22	7	4	11	33	37	−4	25	
8	Iraty	22	7	4	11	26	33	−7	25	
9	Corinthians Paranaense	22	7	3	12	26	33	−7	24	
10	Rio Branco-RR	22	6	6	10	25	41	−16	24	
11	Paraná (R)	22	6	5	11	26	38	−12	23	Relegation to Campeonato Paranaense Série Prata
12	Cascavel (R)	22	1	5	16	15	42	−27	8	Relegation to Campeonato Paranaense Série Prata

Updated to match(es) played on 24 April 2011. Source:
Rules for classification: 1st seeding(winner of the final stage=1st, loser of the final stage=2nd); 2nd points; 3rd wins; 4th goal difference; 5th goals scored; 6th red cards received; 7th yellow cards received; 8th public draw
(C) Champions; (R) Relegated
