= José Oliveira =

José Oliveira may refer to:

- José Oliveira (footballer, born 1997), Timor-Leste football player
- José Oliveira (footballer, born 2002), Portuguese football goalkeeper
- José Manuel Oliveira (born 1967), Spanish racing cyclist
- José María Oliveira, Spanish film director
- José do Patrocínio Oliveira, Brazilian composer, singer, original voice actor of Walt Disney's José Carioca

== See also ==
- José de Oliveira (disambiguation)
