= Marconne Montenegro =

Brazilian football manager

Personal information
- Full name: Marconne dos Santos Montenegro
- Date of birth: 17 June 1974 (age 52)
- Place of birth: Brazil

Team information
- Current team: Horizonte (manager)

Managerial career
- Years: Team
- 2014–2015: Fortaleza U13
- 2016: Fortaleza U17
- 2017–2018: Fortaleza U20 (assistant)
- 2018–2021: Fortaleza U20
- 2018–2021: Fortaleza U23
- 2019: Fortaleza (interim)
- 2020: Fortaleza (interim)
- 2022–: Horizonte

Marconne dos Santos Montenegro (born 17 June 1974) is a Brazilian football manager, currently in charge of Horizonte.

== Career ==
After starting his career in Fortaleza's youth schools, Montenegro joined the club's under-13 squad in 2014. He took over the under-17s in 2016, before being named an assistant of the under-20s in the following year.

In January 2018, Montenegro was named manager of the under-20 squad, replacing Totonho. In August of the following year, he was the interim manager of the main squad in a 2–0 Série A win against CSA, as Rogério Ceni left for Cruzeiro.

On 10 November 2020, as Ceni again left the club, Montenegro was again appointed interim.
