= Horizonte Futebol Clube =

Horizonte
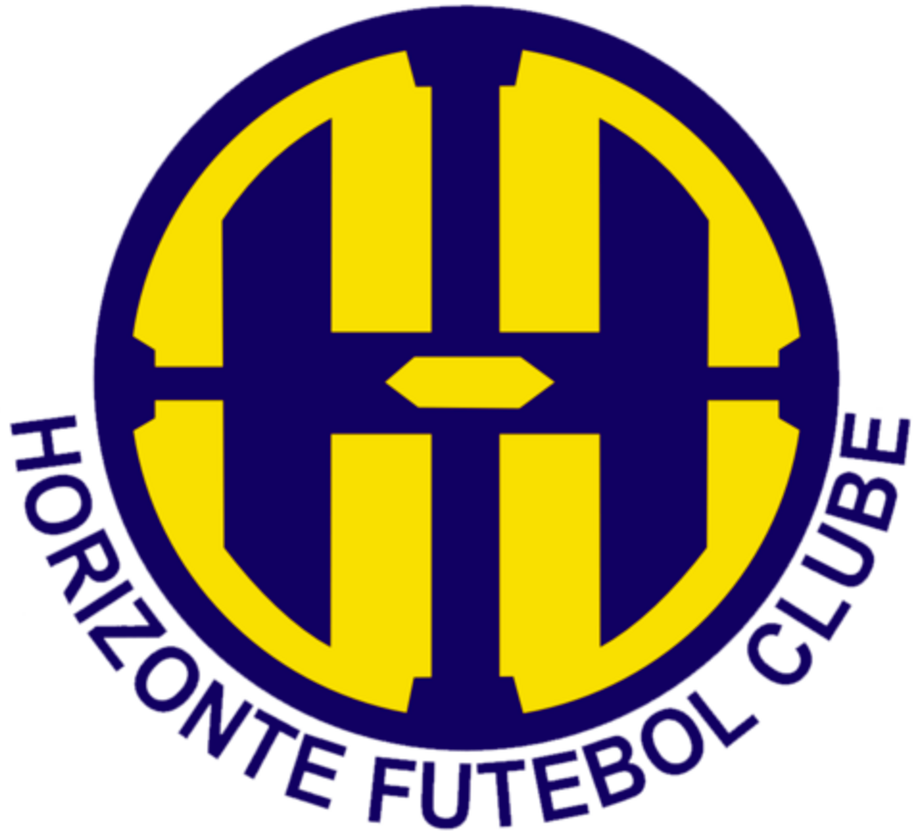
- Full name: Horizonte Futebol Clube
- Nickname: Galo do Tabuleiro
- Founded: 27 March 2004; 22 years ago
- Ground: Domingão, Horizonte, Ceará state, Brazil
- Capacity: 10,500
- President: Paulo Wagner
- League: Campeonato Cearense
- 2025 2025: Série D, 38th of 64; Cearense, 6th of 10
Home colours	Away colours

Horizonte Futebol Clube, commonly known as Horizonte, is a Brazilian football men's and women's team based in Horizonte, Ceará state. The men's team competed in the Série C and in the Copa do Brasil once, while the women's team competed in the Copa do Brasil de Futebol Feminino once.

== History ==
=== Foundation ===
The club was founded on March 27, 2004.

=== Men's team ===
Horizonte won the Campeonato Cearense Second Division in 2007. They competed in the Série C in 2008, when they were eliminated in the First Stage of the competition. Horizonte will compete in the Copa do Brasil in 2011.

=== Women's team ===
The club competed in the Copa do Brasil de Futebol Feminino in 2007, when they were eliminated in the First Stage by Tiradentes.

== Honours ==
- Copa Fares Lopes
  - Winners (2): 2010, 2011
- Campeonato Cearense Série B
  - Winners (2): 2007, 2023
- Taça Padre Cícero
  - Winners (2): 2010, 2012

== Stadium ==
Horizonte Futebol Clube play their home games at Estádio José Domingos Neto, nicknamed Domingão. The stadium has a maximum capacity of 10,000 people.
