= 2010 Campeonato Gaúcho =

Campeonato Gaúcho
- Season: 2010
- Champions: Grêmio
- Relegated: Esportivo; Avenida
- Série D: São José; Pelotas
- Top goalscorer: Jefferson (São José) — 11 goals

The 2010 Campeonato de Primeira Divisão de Futebol Profissional da FGF (2010 FGF First Division Professional Football Championship), better known as the 2010 Campeonato Gaúcho or Gaúcho, was the 90th edition of the top flight football league of the Brazilian state of Rio Grande do Sul. The season began on 16 January and ended on 2 May, when Grêmio, despite losing the final match to their city rivals Internacional 0-1, clinched their 36th title in history thanks to their 2-0 win in the first match. The win broke a 2-year streak by Internacional. Other clubs like São José, Novo Hamburgo and Pelotas also caught the attention due to their overall record in the competition. All three clubs qualified to the 2010 Campeonato Brasileiro Série D.

== Format ==
The sixteen clubs were divided into two groups that would contest in only two matches to determine which four teams from each group would qualify to the play-offs. The first stage called Taça Piratini 2012 (Piratini Cup 2012, won by Caxias) had each team from one group play only one club in the other group. In the second stage, called Taça Farroupilha 2012 (Farroupilha Cup 2012, won by Grêmio) each club within each group played one match against a club in the group. The two lowest ranked teams in the overall standings were relegated (Internacional (SM) and Porto Alegre.

== Teams ==
Porto Alegre and Pelotas — winner and runner-up of the 2009 Campeonato Gaúcho Segunda Divisão, respectively — took the places from Brasil and Sapucaiense, relegated in the last tournament.

Club	Home city	Position in 2009
Avenida	Santa Cruz do Sul	10th
Caxias	Caxias do Sul	8th
Esportivo	Bento Gonçalves	14th
Grêmio	Porto Alegre	Runners-up
Internacional	Porto Alegre	Winners
Internacional (SM)	Santa Maria	11th
Juventude	Caxias do Sul	7th
Novo Hamburgo	Novo Hamburgo	12th
Pelotas	Pelotas	Runners-up (Lower Level)
Porto Alegre	Porto Alegre	Winners (Lower Level)
Santa Cruz	Santa Cruz do Sul	5th
São José	Porto Alegre	9th
São Luiz	Ijuí	13th
Universidade^{1}	Canoas	6th
Veranópolis	Veranópolis	4th
Ypiranga	Erechim	3rd

^{1}The club played the 2009 season under the name S.C. Ulbra.

=== Groups ===
Group 1: Grêmio, Juventude, Avenida, Esportivo, Internacional (SM), Porto Alegre and Ypiranga.

Group 2: Internacional, Caxias, Pelotas, Santa Cruz, São José and São Luiz, Universidade and Veranópolis.

== Taça Fernando Carvalho ==
=== First stage ===
==== Group A standings ====
Pos	Team	Pld	W	D	L	GF	GA	GD	Pts	Qualification
1	Grêmio	8	5	2	1	17	10	+7	17	To Second Stage
2	Novo Hamburgo	8	2	2	4	10	14	−4	8	To Second Stage
3	Internacional (SM)	8	2	2	4	10	18	−8	8	To Second Stage
4	Juventude	8	1	3	4	10	18	−8	6	To Second Stage
5	Ypiranga	8	1	2	5	9	17	−8	5	
6	Porto Alegre	8	1	1	6	10	21	−11	4	
7	Esportivo	8	1	0	7	7	22	−15	3	
8	Avenida	8	0	1	7	8	16	−8	1	

Updated to match(es) played on 14 February 2010. Source: FGF (in Portuguese)
Rules for classification: 1) points; 2) goal difference; 3) number of goals scored.

==== Group B standings ====
Pos	Team	Pld	W	D	L	GF	GA	GD	Pts	Qualification
1	Internacional (Q)	8	7	1	0	19	6	+13	22	To the Second Stage
2	São José-RS (Q)	8	6	1	1	18	10	+8	19	To the Second Stage
3	São Luiz (Q)	8	5	3	0	20	7	+13	18	To the Second Stage
4	Veranópolis (Q)	8	5	2	1	20	11	+9	17	To the Second Stage
5	Pelotas	8	5	0	3	18	10	+8	15	
6	Caxias	8	4	3	1	16	11	+5	15	
7	Santa Cruz-RS	8	4	2	2	12	8	+4	14	
8	Universidade	8	2	1	5	13	18	−5	7	

Updated to match(es) played on 14 February 2010. Source: FGF (in Portuguese)
Rules for classification: 1) points; 2) goal difference; 3) number of goals scored.
(Q) Qualified for the phase indicated

==== Results ====
Home \ Away	AVE	ESP	GRE	ISM	JUV	NHA	POA	YPI	CAX	INT	PEL	SCR	SJO	SLU	UNI	VER
Avenida									2–2	1–2	0–1	0–1	1–3	0–1	2–3	2–3
ESP									0–1	1–2	0–5	1–3	1–2	1–4	3–0	0–3
Grêmio									3–2	0–1	3–2	2–1	2–1	1–1	5–1	1–1
Internacional (SM)									1–1	1–1	3–1	1–4	1–3	0–3	0–3	3–2
Juventude									1–1	0–5	1–3	0–1	2–2	3–3	3–2	0–1
Novo Hamburgo									0–2	1–3	1–0	1–1	2–3	1–2	2–1	2–2
Porto Alegre									4–5	0–1	1–2	1–1	1–2	0–5	2–0	1–5
Ypiranga									0–2	2–4	1–4	2–0	0–2	1–1	1–1	2–3
Caxias																
Internacional																
Pelotas																
Santa Cruz-RS																
São José-RS																
São Luiz																
Universidade																
Veranópolis																

Legend: Blue = home team win; Yellow = draw; Red = away team win.

=== Playoffs ===
Quarter-finals
17 Feb, Olímpico
Grêmio*	4
Veranópolis	2
17 Feb, Passo D'Areia
São José*	0
Internacional (SM)	2
18 Feb, Beira-Rio
Internacional*	2
Juventude	0
18 Feb, Vale
Novo Hamburgo*	2
São Luiz	0

Semi-finals
20 Feb, Olímpico
Grêmio*	4
Internacional (SM)	1
21 Feb, Beira-Rio
Internacional*	1
Novo Hamburgo	2

Final
28 Feb, Olímpico
Grêmio*	1
Novo Hamburgo	0

=== Final ===
28 February
16:00 (GMT -03:00)

Grêmio	1–0	Novo Hamburgo
Ferdinando 20'	Report

Estádio Olímpico Monumental
Attendance: 30,252
Referee: Carlos Eugênio Simon

== Taça Fábio Koff ==
=== First stage ===
==== Group A standings ====
Pos	Team	Pld	W	D	L	GF	GA	GD	Pts	Qualification
1	Grêmio (Q)	7	7	0	0	16	4	+12	21	To Second Stage
2	Novo Hamburgo (Q)	7	4	1	2	13	8	+5	13	To Second Stage
3	Internacional (SM) (Q)	7	3	1	3	11	14	−3	10	To Second Stage
4	Ypiranga (Q)	7	2	3	2	10	13	−3	9	To Second Stage
5	Porto Alegre	7	2	1	4	13	14	−1	7	
6	Esportivo	7	2	1	4	10	15	−5	7	
7	Avenida	7	2	0	5	12	15	−3	6	
8	Juventude	7	1	3	3	9	11	−2	6	

Updated to match(es) played on 4 April 2010. Source: FGF (in Portuguese)
Rules for classification: 1) points; 2) goal difference; 3) number of goals scored.
(Q) Qualified for the phase indicated

==== Group A results ====
Home \ Away	AVE	ESP	GRE	ISM	JUV	NHA	POR	YPI
Avenida			1–3		1–0	1–2		1–2
Esportivo	2–4			1–3	1–1	2–1		
Grêmio		2–0		3–0		2–1	1–0	
Internacional (SM)	3–2				2–4		2–1	
Juventude			1–2				1–1	1–1
Novo Hamburgo				2–0	3–1			0–0
Porto Alegre	3–2	1–2				2–4		5–2
Ypiranga		3–2	1–3	1–1				

Legend: Blue = home team win; Yellow = draw; Red = away team win.

==== Group B standings ====
Pos	Team	Pld	W	D	L	GF	GA	GD	Pts	Qualification
1	Caxias (Q)	7	6	1	0	13	5	+8	19	To the Second Stage
2	São José-RS (Q)	7	3	3	1	16	10	+6	12	To the Second Stage
3	Internacional (Q)	7	3	2	2	12	9	+3	11	To the Second Stage
4	Pelotas (Q)	7	2	3	2	10	10	0	9	To the Second Stage
5	Veranópolis	7	2	2	3	14	13	+1	8	
6	Universidade	7	2	2	3	10	15	−5	8	
7	São Luiz	7	1	2	4	9	13	−4	5	
8	Santa Cruz-RS	7	0	3	4	8	17	−9	3	

Updated to match(es) played on 4 April 2010. Source: FGF (in Portuguese)
Rules for classification: 1) points; 2) goal difference; 3) number of goals scored.
(Q) Qualified for the phase indicated

==== Group B results ====
Home \ Away	CAX	INT	PEL	SCR	SJO	SLU	UNI	VER
Caxias					2–1		1–0	
Internacional			2–2	4–1			4–0	
Pelotas	2–3							1–0
Santa Cruz-RS	1–1					3–3	1–2	0–4
São José-RS		3–0	1–1	2–2		2–1		
São Luiz	0–2	0–1	1–1				3–1	
Universidade			3–2					2–2
Veranópolis	1–2	1–1			2–5			

Legend: Blue = home team win; Yellow = draw; Red = away team win.

=== Playoffs bracket ===
Quarter-finals
8 Apr, Olímpico
Grêmio*	1
Pelotas	2
8 Apr, Passo D'Areia
São José* (p)	0 (3)
Internacional (SM)	0 (1)
7 Apr, Centenário
Caxias*	2 (1)
Ypiranga (p)	2 (3)
7 Apr, Vale
Novo Hamburgo*	3 (4)
Internacional (p)	3 (5)

Semi-finals
11 Apr, Passo D'Areia
Pelotas (p)	1 (4)
São José*	1 (2)
10 Apr, Beira-Rio
Ypiranga	0
Internacional*	2

Final
18 Apr, Beira-Rio
Pelotas	2
Internacional*	3

* Homeground advantage

=== Final ===
18 April
16:00 (GMT -03:00)

Internacional	3–2	Pelotas
Bolivar 42'; Edu 74'; D'Alessandro 82'	Report	Clodoaldo 30', 38'

Estádio Beira-Rio
Attendance: 26,823
Referee: Carlos Eugênio Simon

== Tournament Finals ==
25 April
16:00 (GMT -03:00)

Internacional	0–2	Grêmio
		Rodrigo; Borges

Estádio Beira-Rio
Attendance: 34,744
Referee: Leonardo Gaciba
2 May
16:00 (GMT -03:00)

Grêmio	0–1	Internacional
		Giuliano

Estádio Olímpico Monumental
Referee: Leandro Vuaden

Grêmio won 2–1 on aggregate.

== Overall table ==
The overall table considers only the matches played during the first stage of both Taça Fernando Carvalho and Taça Fábio Koff and will define the two teams that will be relegated to play lower levels in 2011. Moreover, the best and second-best placed teams not playing Campeonato Brasileiro Série A (Grêmio, Internacional), B or C (Caxias, Juventude) will be "promoted" to 2010 Campeonato Brasileiro Série D.

Pos	Team	Pld	W	D	L	GF	GA	GD	Pts	Qualification or relegation
1	Grêmio (C)	15	12	2	1	33	14	+19	38	
2	Caxias	15	10	4	1	29	16	+13	34	2011 Copa do Brasil (Note: Gremio and Internacional were qualified to 2011 Copa Libertadores, thus the berths allocated to Caxias and São José.)
3	Internacional	15	10	3	2	31	15	+16	33	
4	São José-RS	15	9	4	2	34	20	+14	31	Série D 2010 and 2011 Copa do Brasil
5	Veranópolis	15	7	4	4	34	24	+10	25 (Note: Veranópolis withdrew its berth to play Série D 2010)	
6	Pelotas	15	7	3	5	29	21	+8	24	Série D 2010
7	São Luiz	15	6	5	4	29	20	+9	23	
8	Novo Hamburgo	15	6	3	6	23	22	+1	21	
9	Internacional (SM)	15	5	3	7	21	32	−11	18	
10	Santa Cruz-RS	15	4	5	6	20	25	−5	17	
11	Universidade	15	4	3	8	23	33	−10	15	
12	Ypiranga	15	3	5	7	19	30	−11	14	2011 Copa do Brasil (Note: Ypiranga qualified as the 2009 Copa FGF runners.)
13	Juventude	15	2	6	7	19	29	−10	12	
14	Porto Alegre	15	3	2	10	23	35	−12	11	
15	Esportivo	15	3	1	11	17	37	−20	10	Relegation to Lower Levels
16	Avenida	15	2	1	12	20	31	−11	7	Relegation to Lower Levels

Updated to match(es) played on 29 March 2010. Source: FGF (in Portuguese)
Rules for classification: 1) points; 2) goal difference; 3) number of goals scored.
(C) Champions
