= Mendes (footballer, born 1976) =

Brazilian footballer

Personal information
- Full name: Silvio Mendes da Paixão Junior
- Date of birth: 2 April 1976 (age 50)
- Place of birth: Salvador, Brazil
- Height: 1.87 m (6 ft 2 in)
- Position: Forward

Senior career*
Years	Team	Apps	(Gls)
1996	Catuense		
1997	Galícia		
1998–2000	Camaçari		
2000	Heerenveen		
2001	Oriente Petrolero		
2002–2003	Figueirense		
2004	Vila Nova		
2004	Náutico		
2005	Mogi Mirim		
2005	Guarani		
2005	Portuguesa		
2006	Vitória		
2007	Portuguesa Santista		
2007	Peñarol		
2008–2009	Juventude		
2010	Sertãozinho		
2010	Bahia		
2011	Paysandu		
2011	Águia de Marabá		
2012	Novo Hamburgo		
2012	Remo		
2013	CSA		
2013	Penedense		
2014	Brasiliense		
2015	Araxá		
2015	Taboão da Serra		
- * Club domestic league appearances and goals

Silvio Mendes da Paixão Junior (born 2 April 1976), simply known as Mendes, is a Brazilian former professional footballer who played as a forward.

== Career ==
Born in Salvador, Mendes started his career at Catuense. He also played for Galícia and Camaçari, where he was champion of the Copa da Bahia in 1999. He played in Dutch football with Heerenveen before joining Oriente Petrolero in Bolivia, where he was national champion. In 2002 and 2003 he was two-time state champion at Figueirense, and played for other intermediate clubs in Brazil until arriving at Peñarol in 2007, where he scored 11 goals in the 2006–07 Uruguayan Primera División. The following year, he played for Juventude and was one of the top scorers in that year's state championship.

He also played for Bahia, Novo Hamburgo, teams from the state of Pará, CSA, Brasiliense, Araxá and Taboão da Serra, his last professional team. After retiring, he began working as a football commentator on radio and TV in the state of Bahia.

== Honours ==
Camaçari

- Taça Estado da Bahia: 1999

Oriente Petrolero

- Bolivian Primera División: 2001

Figueirense

- Campeonato Catarinense: 2002, 2003

Individual

- 2004 Campeonato Goiano top scorer: 17 goals
- 2008 Campeonato Gaúcho top scorer: 13 goals
