= Domingão =

Football venue in Horizonte, Ceará, Brazil

- Interactive map of Domingão
- Full name: Estádio Olímpico Horácio Domingos de Sousa
- Location: Horizonte, CE, Brazil
- Coordinates: 4.104722°S 38.488056°W
- Owner: City of Horizonte
- Operator: City of Horizonte
- Capacity: 10,500
- Surface: Natural grass
- Field size: 105 × 68 m

Construction
- Groundbreaking: 2003
- Built: 2008
- Opened: 28 December 2008
- Cost: R$ 20 million

Tenants
- Horizonte; Floresta

Estádio Olímpico Horácio Domingos de Sousa, commonly known as Domingão, is a multi-use stadium in Horizonte, Ceará, Brazil. It is used mostly for football matches, and has a maximum capacity of 10,500 people.

The construction of the stadium began in 2003 and ended in 2008, with a R$ 20 million cost. Named after Horácio Domingos de Sousa, a political leader which helped to create Horizonte FC.

The stadium was inaugurated on 28 December 2008, in a match between Horizonte and Ceará. In March 2021, as the city of Fortaleza was in lockdown, Fortaleza EC chose Domingão as their home stadium for the latter stages of the 2021 Campeonato Cearense.
