= Marcelo Costa =

Brazilian footballer

Personal information
- Full name: Marcelo Pereira da Costa
- Date of birth: 24 July 1980 (age 46)
- Place of birth: Campinas do Sul, Brazil
- Height: 1.76 m (5 ft 9 1/2 in)
- Position: Attacking midfielder

Team information
- Current team: Joinville

Youth career
- 1998–1999: Juventude

Senior career*
Years	Team	Apps	(Gls)
2000–2004	Juventude	78	(6)
2004–2005	Nacional	24	(2)
2005–2006	→ Grêmio (loan)	6	(1)
2006–2009	Palmeiras	10	(0)
2007	→ Juventude (loan)		
2008	→ Ipatinga (loan)		
2008	→ Juventude (loan)		
2010	Caxias	8	(1)
2010–2011	Goiás	27	(3)
2012	São Caetano	31	(7)
2013–2015	Joinville	73	(16)
2016–	Paysandu		
- * Club domestic league appearances and goals

Marcelo Pereira da Costa (born 24 July 1980, in Campinas do Sul), is a Brazilian footballer who plays as an attacking midfielder for Paysandu.

== Honours ==
Grêmio

- Campeonato Brasileiro Série B: 2005
- Campeonato Gaúcho: 2006

Joinville

- Campeonato Brasileiro Série B: 2014

Paysandu

- Campeonato Paraense: 2016
- Copa Verde: 2016
