= Estádio Coronel Emílio Gomes =

Multi-use stadium in Irati, Brazil

Coordinates: 25°28′01.13″S 50°39′33.82″W

- Interactive map of Estádio Coronel Emílio Gomes
- Location: Irati, Paraná, Brazil
- Capacity: 8,000

Construction
- Groundbreaking: 1950
- Built: 1950

Tenant
- Iraty Sport Club

Estádio Coronel Emílio Gomes is a multi-use stadium located in Irati, Brazil. It is used mostly for football matches and hosts the home matches of Iraty Sport Club. The stadium has a maximum capacity of 8,000 people and was built in 1950.
