= José de Oliveira =

José de Oliveira can refer to:

- José Alberto de Oliveira Anchieta (1832–1897), Portuguese explorer and naturalist
- José Luiz de Oliveira (born 1904), Brazilian footballer
- José Freire de Oliveira Neto (1928–2012), Brazilian Catholic bishop
- José Ribamar de Oliveira (1932–1974), Brazilian footballer
- Zé Olívio (José Olivio Miranda Oliveira, 1947-2008), Brazilian trade unionist
- José Aparecido de Oliveira, Brazilian politician, minister of Culture (Brazil) 1985 and 1988–1990
- José Carlos de Oliveira, Brazilian runner in 1995 South American Championships in Athletics and 1999 IAAF World Cross Country Championships – Men's short race
- José Roberto de Oliveira (born 1980), Brazilian footballer
- Márcio José de Oliveira (born 1984), Brazilian footballer
- José Jefferson Rodrigues de Oliveira (born 1985), Brazilian footballer
- Paulinho (footballer, born April 1986), Brazilian footballer, full name Paulo José de Oliveira
- José Rogério de Oliveira Melo (born 1990), Brazilian footballer

== See also ==
- Éder Bonfim (Éder José de Oliveira Bonfim, born 1981), Brazilian footballer
- Baltemar Brito (Baltemar José de Oliveira, born 1952), Brazilian footballer
- José Dirceu (José Dirceu de Oliveira e Silva, born 1946), Brazilian politician
- Alex Fraga (Alex José de Oliveira Fraga, born 1986), Brazilian footballer
- Anderson Lessa (José Anderson de Oliveira Lessa, born 1989), Brazilian footballer
- Zezé Motta (Maria José Motta de Oliveira, born 1944), Brazilian actress and singer
- Alexandre José Oliveira (Alexandre José de Oliveira Albuquerque, born 1977), Brazilian footballer
- Cássio Oliveira (Cássio José de Abreu Oliveira, born 1980), Brazilian footballer
- Juca de Oliveira (José de Oliveira Santos, born 1935), Brazilian actor
- Zezé Perrella (José Perrella de Oliveira Costa, born 1956), Brazilian footballer
- Tibi (Portuguese footballer) (António José de Oliveira Meireles, born 1951), Brazilian footballer
