= Gilmak =

Brazilian footballer (born 1986)

Personal information
- Full name: Gilmak Queiroz da Silva
- Date of birth: December 2, 1986 (age 39)
- Place of birth: Horizonte, Brazil
- Height: 1.79 m (5 ft 10 in)
- Position: Midfielder

Team information
- Current team: Botafogo-SP

Senior career*
Years	Team	Apps	(Gls)
2003–2006	Horizonte FC		
2005	→ Quixadá FC (loan)		
2006	→ Noroeste (loan)		
2007	Aracati EC		
2008–2012	Fortaleza	19	(1)
2010	→ Fredrikstad FK (loan)	1	(0)
2013–	Botafogo-SP		
- * Club domestic league appearances and goals as of 18 May 2013

Gilmak Queiroz da Silva, commonly known as Gilmak, (born December 2, 1986, in Horizonte, Brazil) is a Brazilian footballer who plays as a midfielder for Brazilian club Botafogo-SP.

He made his debut for Fredrikstad FK as a substitute against Strømmen IF August 8, 2010.
