= Acleisson =

Brazilian footballer (born 1982)

Personal information
- Full name: Acleisson Scaion
- Date of birth: 21 May 1982 (age 44)
- Place of birth: Brazil
- Height: 1.76 m (5 ft 9 in)
- Position: Midfielder

Senior career*
Years	Team	Apps	(Gls)
2000–2004	Botafogo-SP		
2005–2008	São Carlos		
2007	→ Mika (loan)		
2008	Mirassol	15	(2)
2009–2010	Portuguesa	62	(0)
2011	Avaí	20	(0)
2012	Mirassol	13	(2)
2012	CA Bragantino	22	(2)
2013	Comercial-SP	22	(1)
2013	Guaratinguetá	6	(0)
2014	Ferroviária	11	(0)
2015	Thespakusatsu Gunma	22	(1)
2017–2018	Rio Claro	26	(0)
2017–2018	Portuguesa Santista	15	(0)
2020	Rio Claro	10	(0)
2021	Penapolense	10	(0)
- * Club domestic league appearances and goals as of 14:03, 24 August 2023 (UTC) ‡ National team caps and goals as of 14:03, 24 August 2023 (UTC)

Acleisson Scaion (born May 21, 1982) is a former Brazilian football player.

== Playing career ==
Acleisson played professionally for Associação Portuguesa de Desportos, appearing in the Campeonato Brasileiro Série B for two seasons, before joining former manager Vagner Benazzi at Avaí FC where he played in the Campeonato Brasileiro Série A.

Acleisson played for J2 League club; Thespakusatsu Gunma in 2015 season.
