= Campinas do Sul =

Municipality in Rio Grande do Sul, Brazil

Coordinates: 27°43′S 52°37′W

- Municipality
- Flag Coat of arms
- Interactive map of Campinas do Sul
- Country: Brazil
- Time zone: UTC−3 (BRT)

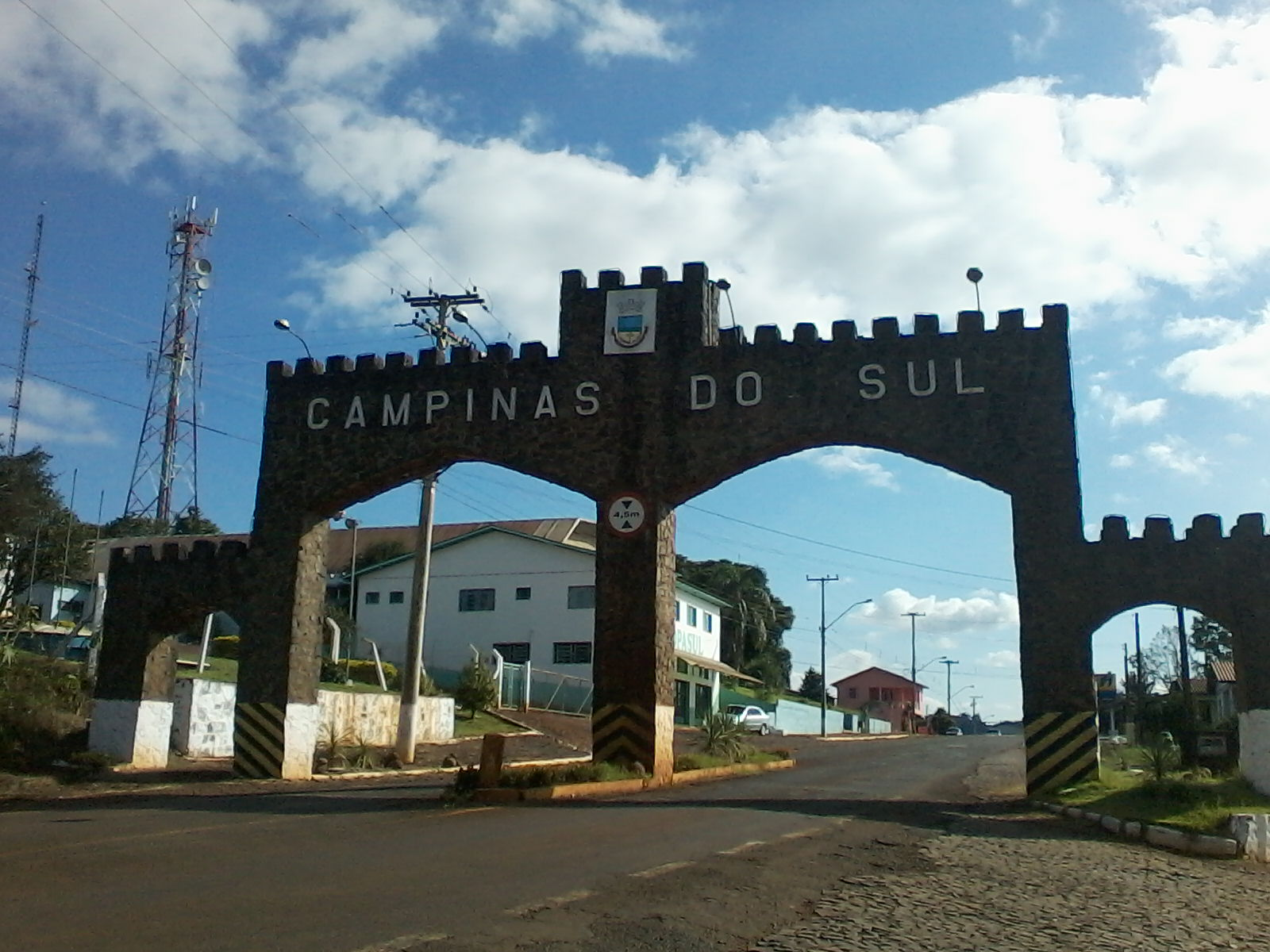

Campinas do Sul is a municipality in the state of Rio Grande do Sul, Brazil. As of 2020, the estimated population was 5,438.

== See also ==
- List of municipalities in Rio Grande do Sul
