= João Marcos (footballer, born 1981) =

Brazilian footballer

Personal information
- Full name: João Marcos Alves Ferreira
- Date of birth: 24 June 1981 (age 45)
- Place of birth: Marília, Brazil
- Height: 1.77 m (5 ft 10 in)
- Position: Defensive midfielder

Senior career*
Years	Team	Apps	(Gls)
2003–2006	Marília		
2007	Ponte Preta		
2008	Marília		
2009	Noroeste		
2009–2017	Ceará		
- * Club domestic league appearances and goals

João Marcos Alves Ferreira (born 24 June 1981 in Marília), known as João Marcos, is a Brazilian former professional footballer who played as a defensive midfielder.

== Honours ==
Ceará

- Campeonato Cearense: 2011, 2012, 2013, 2014
- Copa do Nordeste: 2015
