= Camaçari Futebol Clube =

Brazilian football club

Camaçari
- Full name: Camaçari Futebol Clube
- Founded: November 8, 1968
- Ground: Estádio Armando Oliveira, Camaçari, Bahia state, Brazil
- Capacity: 7,000
- President: Fernando Lopes
- Head Coach: Sapatão
- Website: http://www.camacarifc.com/
Home colours	Away colours

Camaçari Futebol Clube, commonly known as Camaçari, is a Brazilian football club from Camaçari, Bahia state. They competed in the Série D once.

== History ==
The club was founded on November 8, 1968. They won the Campeonato Baiano Second Level in 1991 and in 1997 and the Taça Estado da Bahia in 1999. They competed in the Série D in 2010, when they were eliminated in the First Stage.

== Honours ==
- Taça Estado da Bahia
  - Winners (1): 1999
- Campeonato Baiano Second Division
  - Winners (2): 1991, 1997

== Stadium ==
Camaçari Futebol Clube play their home games at Estádio Armando Oliveira. The stadium has a maximum capacity of 7,000 people.
