= Gilson (footballer, born 1979) =

Brazilian footballer

Personal information
- Full name: Gilson Rosa de Jesus
- Date of birth: November 29, 1979 (age 46)
- Place of birth: Brasília, Brazil
- Height: 1.85 m (6 ft 1 in)
- Position: Central defender

Team information
- Current team: ABC

Senior career*
Years	Team	Apps	(Gls)
2002–2003	Gama	0	(0)
2003–2006	Brasiliense	0	(0)
2007–2008	→ Atlético Goianiense (loan)	0	(0)
2009–2013	Atlético Goianiense	80	(6)
2013–	ABC	6	(0)
- * Club domestic league appearances and goals as of September 26, 2010 ‡ National team caps and goals as of September 26, 2010

Gilson Rosa de Jesus (born 29 November 1979) is a Brazilian footballer.

== Career ==
Gilson played in only three clubs, and settled more time in Brasiliense.

Throughout his career Gilson won four national championships titles between them the second and third division.

== Honours ==
- Campeonato Brasileiro (2ª divisão): 2002
- Campeonato Brasiliense: 2004, 2005, 2006
- Campeonato Goiano: 2007
- Campeonato Brasileiro (3ª divisão): 2008

== Contract ==
- Atlético Goianiense.
