= Revson (footballer) =

Brazilian footballer

Personal information
- Full name: Revson Cordeiro dos Santos
- Date of birth: 20 December 1987 (age 38)
- Place of birth: Cascavel, Brazil
- Height: 1.86 m (6 ft 1 in)
- Positions: Midfielder; defender

Team information
- Current team: Azuriz Pato Branco

Senior career*
Years	Team	Apps	(Gls)
2007	Grêmio	45	(0)
2008	Sete de Setembro	0	(0)
2008	Luverdense	6	(0)
2008	Caxias	8	(0)
2009	AA Iguaçu	0	(0)
2009–2010	Pato Branco	30	(15)
2011	Avaí	9	(0)
2012	São Caetano	9	(0)
2012–2013	Nacional Madeira	20	(3)
2013	→ CSKA Sofia (loan)	5	(0)
2014–2015	Avaí	18	(1)
2016	Inter de Lages	11	(1)
2016	Anápolis	2	(0)
2017	Bragantino	8	(0)
2017	Real Estelí	0	(0)
2018	Hercílio Luz	10	(0)
2018	Toledo	15	(3)
2019	Operário	10	(0)
2020–	Brasil de Pelotas	8	(0)
2022	→ Azuriz Pato Branco (loan)	0	(0)
- * Club domestic league appearances and goals as of 21 May 2018

Revson Cordeiro dos Santos (born 20 December 1987), simply known as Revson, is a Brazilian professional footballer who plays as a midfielder for Azuriz Pato Branco.
