= Ronaldo Tres =

Brazilian footballer

Personal information
- Date of birth: 13 February 1987 (age 39)
- Place of birth: Rodeio Bonito, Rio Grande do Sul, Brazil
- Height: 1.75 m (5 ft 9 in)
- Position: Defensive midfielder

Youth career
- 2005–2006: Atlético-PR

Senior career*
Years	Team	Apps	(Gls)
2006–2007	→ Figueirense (Loan)		
2007	→ Rio Branco-PR (Loan)		
2007–2008	Figueirense		
2009–2010	Corinthians-PR		
2010–2012	Corinthians		
2010–2011	→ Guarani (Loan)	3	(0)
2011	→ Bragantino (Loan)		
2012	→ Ipatinga (Loan)	5	(1)
2013–2014	Figueirense	21	(0)
2015	J. Malucelli	10	(0)
2016	Veranópolis	11	(0)
2017	Cruzeiro-RS	12	(0)
2017	Espírito Santo	10	(0)
- * Club domestic league appearances and goals

Ronaldo Tres (born 13 February 1987) is a Brazilian former football defensive midfielder.

== Contract ==
2010 - Corinthians
2010. 5 - 2011. 5 Guarani (Loan)
2011. 5 - 2011. 7 Corinthians B
2011. 7 - 2011. 10 Guarani (Loan)
