= Eusébio (footballer, born 1985) =

Brazilian footballer

Personal information
- Full name: José Jefferson Rodrigues de Oliveira
- Date of birth: September 22, 1985 (age 41)
- Place of birth: Fortaleza, Brazil
- Height: 1.68 m (5 ft 6 in)
- Positions: Centre midfielder; left wing back

Team information
- Current team: Atlético Goianiense

Youth career
- Fortaleza

Senior career*
Years	Team	Apps	(Gls)
2005–2010	Fortaleza	39	(6)
2010–	Ceará	62	(3)
2013	→ Guarani (loan)	0	(0)
2014–	→ Atlético Goianiense (loan)		
- * Club domestic league appearances and goals as of 17 April 2013 (UTC)

Jefferson José Rodrigues de Oliveira, known as Eusébio (born September 22, 1985, in Fortaleza) is a Brazilian footballer, currently playing for Atlético Goianiense, on loan from Ceará.

== Career ==
In 2008, Eusébio made it to the GAIS in Sweden for testing, but with the exchange of coaches in his time was sent back.

== Contract ==
- Ceará.
