= Iraty Sport Club =

Iraty
- Full name: Iraty Sport Club
- Nickname: Azulão
- Founded: April 21, 1914
- Ground: Coronel Emílio Gomes, Irati, Brazil
- Capacity: 8,000
- Chairman: Odair Sérgio Marochi Filho
- Manager: Karmino Colombini
- League: Campeonato Paranaense
- 2021: 4th of 12th
Home colours	Away colours

Iraty Sport Club, or simply Iraty, is a Brazilian football team from Irati in Paraná, founded on April 21, 1914.

Their home stadium is the Coronel Emílio Gomes stadium, capacity 8,000.

== History ==
The club was founded at Irati city, in 1914. The founders were a group of sportsmen led by Antônio Xavier da Silveira. Iraty Sport Club is one of the oldest clubs of Paraná and the club's first match was in 1914, defeating Imbituvense by 3-0.

On May 1, 2002, the club won its first state championship, competing the Copa do Brasil of the following year. In that year, the club also won the Campeonato Paranaense de Juniores (Paraná Youth Championship).

== Honours ==
=== State ===
- Campeonato Paranaense
  - Winners (1): 2002
- Copa Paraná
  - Runners-up (1): 2006
- Campeonato Paranaense Série Prata
  - Winners (1): 1993
  - Runners-up (1): 2000
- Campeonato Paranaense do Interior
  - Winners (4): 1998, 2002, 2005, 2010

== Squads 2011 ==
Note: Flags indicate national team as defined under FIFA eligibility rules; some limited exceptions apply. Players may hold more than one non-FIFA nationality.

No. / Pos. / Nation / Player; — / MF / BRA / Marcelo Ceará	No. / Pos. / Nation / Player

=== Out to loan ===
Note: Flags indicate national team as defined under FIFA eligibility rules; some limited exceptions apply. Players may hold more than one non-FIFA nationality.

No.	Pos.	Nation	Player
—	DF	BRA	Élson (to Americano-RJ)
—	DF	BRA	Edson (to Grêmio Barueri)

No.	Pos.	Nation	Player
—	DF	BRA	Rogério (to Atlético-GO)
—	FW	BRA	Leandro Rodrigues (to Chapecoense)

== Coach ==
- (Croatia) Ivica Kulasevic (2002)
