= Horizonte, Ceará =

Municipality in Ceará, Brazil

Coordinates: 4°5′56″S 38°29′45″W

Horizonte
- Municipality
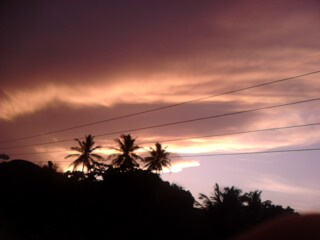

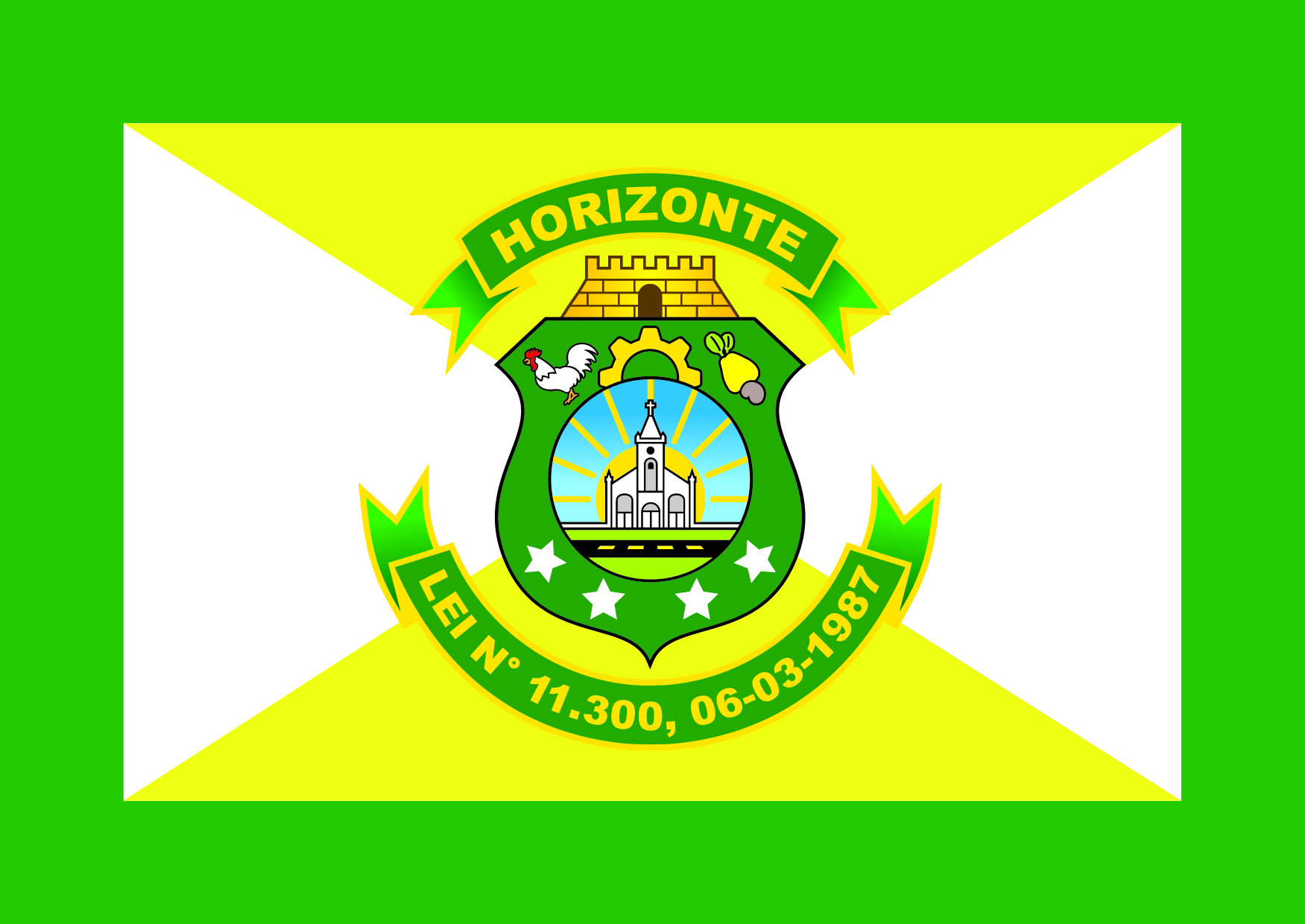
- Flag
- Interactive map of Horizonte
- Country: Brazil
- Region: Nordeste
- State: Ceará
- Mesoregion: Metropolitana de Fortaleza

Population (2020)
  - Total: 68,529
- Time zone: UTC−3 (BRT)

Horizonte is a municipality in the state of Ceará in the Northeast region of Brazil.

== Automotive ==
Among some Enterprises locally, there was the Troller, which was closed by Ford and bought by State Government who resold to Comexport. This together General Motors do Brasil planned to the import the vehicles Chevrolet Captiva EV and Chevrolet Spark EUV to be assembled there with parts in CKD of China, started on 3 Dezember 2025, an investment of R$ 400 million of US$ 73,7 million since 2026. 10 Units a day, 5 each Model, 100 Monthly each. Indeed, the PACE Horizonte Ceará, Ceará Automotive Plant reached maximum physical capacity and an adjacent area of 400,000 square meters (m²) was already deforest for expansion. With the arrival of MG Motor, with models to begin in October 2026 of this year with two 100% electric models, the MG4 EV Urban, an entry-level hatchback, and the MG S5 with more 600 jobs, the multi-brand space in Horizonte is working to attract system integrators to strengthen the production chain in the state. The plant had already surpassed the mark of 2,500 new technology vehicles produced by General Motors this month, a leap compared to the 1,200 older technology vehicles that the unit produced annually in the past, when it was still the Troller plant.

== See also ==
- List of municipalities in Ceará
