= Irati, Paraná =

Irati
- Municipality
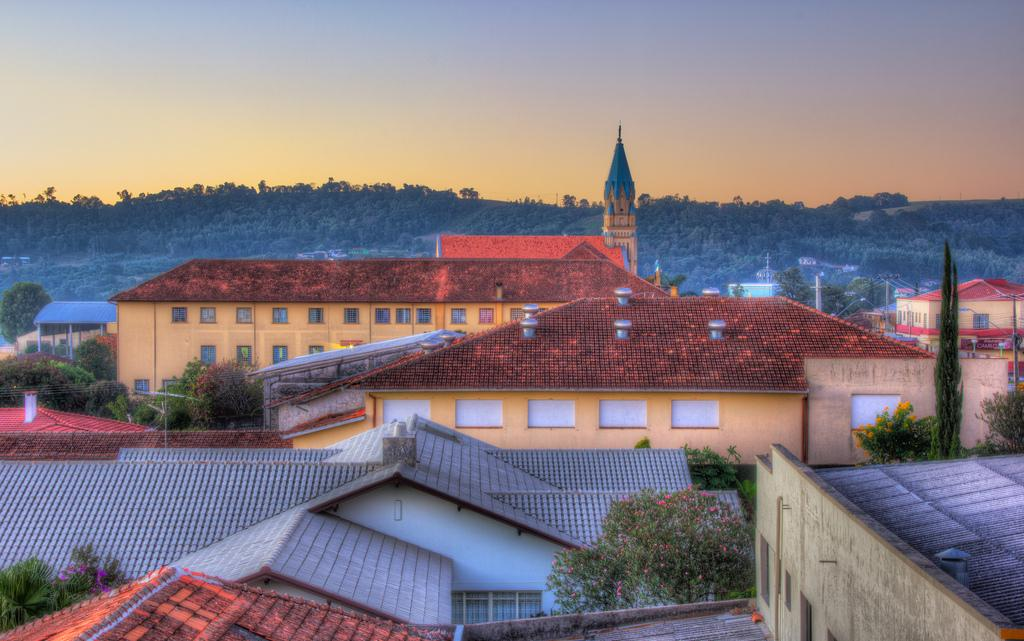
- Church of São Miguel

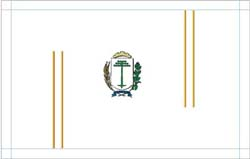
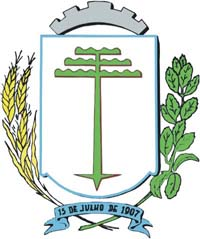
- Flag Coat of arms

- Location of Irati

- Location in Brazil
- Coordinates: 25°28′11″S 50°39′17″W
- Country: Brazil
- Region: Southern
- State: Paraná
- Mesoregion: Sudeste Paranaense

Population (2022)
  - Total: 59,250
  - Density: 153.5/sq mi (59.28/km^{2})
- Time zone: UTC−3 (BRT)

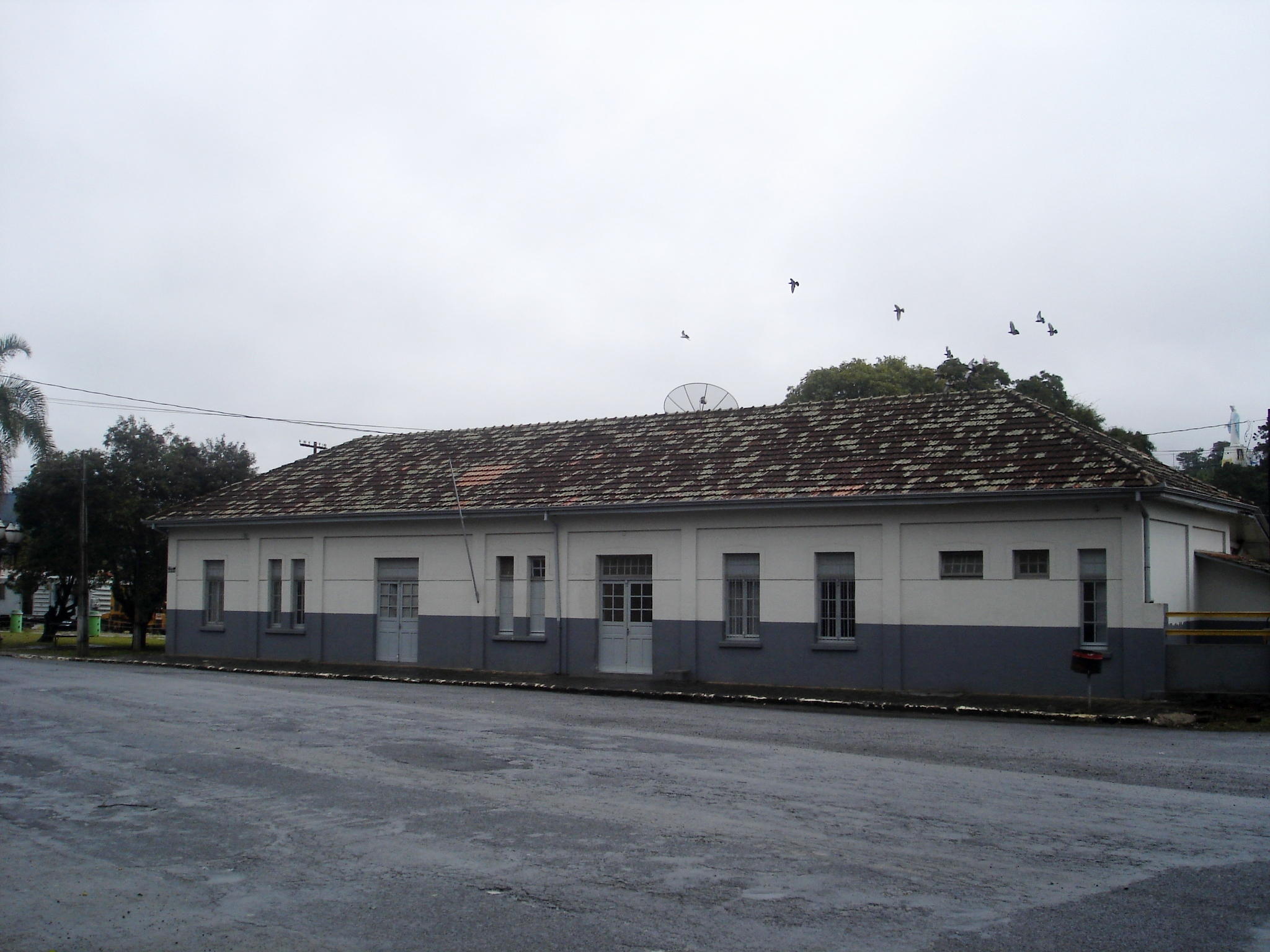
Irati railway station, 2009

Irati is a municipality in the state of Paraná in Brazil, located in the southeastern region of the state. Its population at the 2022 census was 59,250. The main ethnicities are especially Poles and Ukrainians, who seek to maintain customs and traditions of their ancestors.

Irati sprang up in the 1890s as a railroad town along the São Paulo – Rio Grande do Sul railroad line. The name, Irati, comes from the Tupi language and reportedly means "river of honey" (apparently there were many bees in the region).

A distinguishing feature of many small towns in southern Brazil is the municipal anthem.

== Climate ==
Irati has an oceanic climate (Köppen]: Cfb) with warm summers, mild winters, and abundant rainfall.

Climate data for Irati, Paraná (1991–2020)
Month	Jan	Feb	Mar	Apr	May	Jun	Jul	Aug	Sep	Oct	Nov	Dec	Year
Mean daily maximum °C (°F)	27.4 (81.3)	27.3 (81.1)	26.6 (79.9)	24.6 (76.3)	20.8 (69.4)	19.7 (67.5)	20.0 (68.0)	22.1 (71.8)	23.0 (73.4)	24.5 (76.1)	26.0 (78.8)	27.2 (81.0)	24.1 (75.4)
Daily mean °C (°F)	21.2 (70.2)	21.1 (70.0)	20.1 (68.2)	17.8 (64.0)	14.4 (57.9)	13.4 (56.1)	12.9 (55.2)	14.4 (57.9)	16.1 (61.0)	18.1 (64.6)	19.3 (66.7)	20.8 (69.4)	17.5 (63.5)
Mean daily minimum °C (°F)	17.2 (63.0)	17.2 (63.0)	16.0 (60.8)	13.6 (56.5)	10.2 (50.4)	9.2 (48.6)	8.2 (46.8)	9.1 (48.4)	11.3 (52.3)	13.8 (56.8)	14.7 (58.5)	16.4 (61.5)	13.1 (55.6)
Average precipitation mm (inches)	199.4 (7.85)	161.5 (6.36)	128.2 (5.05)	106.2 (4.18)	118.4 (4.66)	137.7 (5.42)	109.0 (4.29)	86.2 (3.39)	155.6 (6.13)	186.1 (7.33)	129.6 (5.10)	149.8 (5.90)	1,667.7 (65.66)
Average precipitation days (≥ 1.0 mm)	14.1	12.4	10.0	7.0	7.0	7.6	6.6	6.0	9.1	11.6	9.6	12.3	113.3
Average relative humidity (%)	80.7	81.5	81.2	81.4	83.8	85.1	81.6	76.6	77.2	79.5	76.3	78.4	80.3
Average dew point °C (°F)	18.4 (65.1)	18.4 (65.1)	17.4 (63.3)	15.4 (59.7)	12.6 (54.7)	11.7 (53.1)	10.7 (51.3)	11.1 (52.0)	12.8 (55.0)	15.0 (59.0)	15.6 (60.1)	17.4 (63.3)	14.7 (58.5)
Mean monthly sunshine hours	162.7	141.5	161.3	157.0	141.0	131.5	158.1	177.8	140.7	142.7	169.8	172.0	1,856.1
Source: NOAA

== Notable people ==
- Eliana Michaelichen Bezerra – TV hostess, actress and singer
- Pedro Muffato – politician, businessman and racing driver
