= 2014 Copa Verde =

Tournament details
- Country: Brazil
- Dates: 11 February – 21 April
- Teams: 16

Final positions
- Champions: (Federal District (Brazil)) Brasília (1st title)
- Runners-up: (Pará) Paysandu

Tournament statistics
- Matches played: 30
- Goals scored: 82 (2.73 per match)
- Top goal scorer(s): (Brazil) Lima (7 goals)

The 2014 Copa Verde was the first edition of a football competition held in the Brazil. Featuring 16 clubs, with Pará has three vacancies; Amazonas, Distrito Federal and Mato Grosso with two each and Acre, Amapá, Espírito Santo, Mato Grosso do Sul, Rondônia, Roraima and Tocantins. The champion earned the spot in the 2015 Copa Sudamericana.

Brasília won the final over Paysandu. However, on July 28, 2014, the title was awarded to Paysandu, due to irregularities of the squad of Brasília. Brasília appealed the decision, and obtained a suspension which reversed this decision temporarily. A final decision by the Superior Court of Sports Justice (STJD) declared Brasília as the champion.

== Qualified teams ==
Association	Team	Qualification method
(Acre (state)) Acre; 1 berth	Plácido de Castro	2013 Campeonato Acriano champions
(Amapá) Amapá; 1 berth	Santos	2013 Campeonato Amapaense champions
(Amazonas (Brazilian state)) Amazonas; 2 berths	Princesa do Solimões	2013 Campeonato Amazonense champions
(Amazonas (Brazilian state)) Amazonas; 2 berths	Nacional	2013 Campeonato Amazonense runners-up
(Federal District (Brazil)) Distrito Federal; 2 berths	Brasiliense	2013 Campeonato Brasiliense champions
(Federal District (Brazil)) Distrito Federal; 2 berths	Brasília	2013 Campeonato Brasiliense runners-up
(Espírito Santo) Espírito Santo; 1 berth	Desportiva Ferroviária	2013 Campeonato Capixaba champions
(Mato Grosso) Mato Grosso; 2 berths	Cuiabá	2013 Campeonato Mato-Grossense champions
(Mato Grosso) Mato Grosso; 2 berths	Mixto	2013 Campeonato Mato-Grossense runners-up
(Mato Grosso do Sul) Mato Grosso do Sul; 1 berth	CENE	2013 Campeonato Sul-Mato-Grossense champions
(Pará) Pará; 3 berths	Paysandu	2013 Campeonato Paraense champions
(Pará) Pará; 3 berths	Paragominas	2013 Campeonato Paraense runners-up
(Pará) Pará; 3 berths	Remo	2013 Campeonato Paraense 3rd place
(Rondônia) Rondônia; 1 berth	Vilhena	2013 Campeonato Rondoniense champions
(Roraima) Roraima; 1 berth	Náutico	2013 Campeonato Roraimense champions
(Tocantins) Tocantins; 1 berth	Interporto	2013 Campeonato Tocantinense champions

== Bracket ==
Round of 16
(Roraima) Náutico	2	0	2
(Pará) Paysandu	7	4	11
(Amazonas (Brazilian state)) Princesa do Solimões	1	2	3
(Amapá) Santos	0	2	2
(Pará) Paragominas	1	2	3
(Pará) Remo	2	4	6
(Acre (state)) Plácido de Castro	0	0	0
(Amazonas (Brazilian state)) Nacional	0	1	1
(Federal District (Brazil)) Brasília	0	2	2
(Mato Grosso do Sul) CENE	0	0	0
(Espírito Santo) Desportiva Ferroviária	0	1	1
(Mato Grosso) Cuiabá	0	2	2
(Tocantins) Interporto	0	0	0
(Federal District (Brazil)) Brasiliense	2	2	4
(Rondônia) Vilhena	4	1	5
(Mato Grosso) Mixto	1	2	3

Quarter-finals
(Pará) Paysandu	6	2	8
(Amazonas (Brazilian state)) Princesa do Solimões	1	1	2
(Pará) Remo (a)	1	2	3
(Amazonas (Brazilian state)) Nacional	1	2	3
(Federal District (Brazil)) Brasília	1	0	1
(Mato Grosso) Cuiabá	0	0	0
(Federal District (Brazil)) Brasiliense	1	4	5
(Rondônia) Vilhena	0	3	3

Semi-finals
(Pará) Paysandu	1	0	1
(Pará) Remo	0	0	0
(Federal District (Brazil)) Brasília	0	3	3
(Federal District (Brazil)) Brasiliense	2	0	2

Finals
(Pará) Paysandu	2	1	3 (6)
(Federal District (Brazil)) Brasília (p)	1	2	3 (7)

== Finals ==
8 April 2014
21:00 BRT (UTC−3)

Paysandu (Pará)	2–1	(Federal District (Brazil)) Brasília
Héverton 14'; Lima 53'	Report	Gilmar 8'

Mangueirão, Belém
Attendance: 18,256
Referee: Wagner Reway

21 April 2014
17:00 BRT (UTC−3)

Brasília (Federal District (Brazil))	2–1	(Pará) Paysandu
Gilmar 39' (pen.); Alekito 54'	Report	Leandro Carvalho 84'
Penalties
Matheuzinho (penalty missed); Natan (penalty scored); Daniel (penalty scored); Rennan (penalty scored); Claudecir (penalty scored); Índio (penalty scored); Alekito (penalty scored); Fernando (penalty scored)	7–6	(penalty scored) Augusto Recife; (penalty scored) Yago Pikachu; (penalty scored) João Paulo; (penalty scored) Leandro Carvalho; (penalty missed) Lima; (penalty scored) Bruninho; (penalty scored) Djalma; (penalty missed) Heliton

Estádio Nacional Mané Garrincha, Brasília
Attendance: 51,701
Referee: Pablo dos Santos Alves

Tied 3–3 on aggregate, Brasília won on penalties.
