= 2014 Copa Verde finals =

- Event: 2014 Copa Verde
Paysandu	Brasília
(Pará)	(Federal District (Brazil))
3	3
- on aggregate Brasília won 7–6 on penalties

First leg
Paysandu	Brasília
2	1
- Date: 8 April 2014
- Venue: Mangueirão, Belém
- Referee: Wagner Reway
- Attendance: 18,256

Second leg
Brasília	Paysandu
2	1
- Date: 21 April 2014
- Venue: Estádio Nacional Mané Garrincha, Brasília
- Referee: Pablo dos Santos Alves
- Attendance: 51,701

The 2014 Copa Verde finals was the final two-legged tie that decided the 2014 Copa Verde, the 1st season of the Copa Verde, Brazil's regional cup football tournament organised by the Brazilian Football Confederation.

The finals were contested in a two-legged home-and-away format between Paysandu, from Pará, and Brasília, from Distrito Federal.

Paysandu won the first leg 2–1, and Brasília won the second leg by the same score, which meant the title was decided by a penalty shoot-out, which Brasília won 7–6 to claim their first Copa Verde title. However, on 28 July 2014, the title was awarded to Paysandu, due to irregularities of the squad of Brasília. Brasília appealed against this decision, and obtained a suspension which reversed this decision temporarily. A final decision by the Superior Court of Sports Justice (STJD) declared Brasília as the champion.

== Teams ==
Team	Previous finals appearances (bold indicates winners)
(Pará) Paysandu	None
(Federal District (Brazil)) Brasília	None

=== Road to the final ===
Note: In all scores below, the score of the finalist is given first.

(Pará) Paysandu			Round	(Federal District (Brazil)) Brasília		
Opponent	Venue	Score		Opponent	Venue	Score
(Roraima) Náutico (won 11–2 on aggregate)	Away	7–2	Round of 16	(Mato Grosso do Sul) CENE (won 2–0 on aggregate)	Home	0–0
(Roraima) Náutico (won 11–2 on aggregate)	Home	4–0	Round of 16	(Mato Grosso do Sul) CENE (won 2–0 on aggregate)	Away	2–0
(Amazonas (Brazilian state)) Princesa do Solimões (won 8–2 on aggregate)	Home	6–1	Quarter-finals	(Mato Grosso) Cuiabá (won 1–0 on aggregate)	Home	1–0
(Amazonas (Brazilian state)) Princesa do Solimões (won 8–2 on aggregate)	Away	2–1	Quarter-finals	(Mato Grosso) Cuiabá (won 1–0 on aggregate)	Away	0–0
(Pará) Remo (won 1–0 on aggregate)	Neutral	1–0	Semi-finals	(Federal District (Brazil)) Brasiliense (won 3–2 on aggregate)	Home	0–2
(Pará) Remo (won 1–0 on aggregate)	Neutral	0–0	Semi-finals	(Federal District (Brazil)) Brasiliense (won 3–2 on aggregate)	Away	3–0

== Matches ==
=== First leg ===
8 April 2014
21:00 BRT (UTC−3)

Paysandu (Pará)	2–1	(Federal District (Brazil)) Brasília
Héverton 14'; Lima 53'	Report	Gilmar 8'

Mangueirão, Belém
Attendance: 18,256
Referee: Wagner Reway (Mato Grosso)

**Paysandu**	**Brasília**

GK	101	(Brazil) Matheus
DF	107	(Brazil) Djalma
DF	103	(Brazil) Charles
DF	104	(Brazil) João Paulo
DF	106	(Brazil) Airton
MF	105	(Brazil) Ricardo Capanema	(yellow card) 39'
MF	108	(Brazil) Zé Antônio	(substituted off) 88'
MF	111	(Brazil) Billy
MF	102	(Brazil) Yago Pikachu	(substituted off) 73'
MF	110	(Brazil) Héverton (c)	(substituted off) 58'
FW	109	(Brazil) Lima
Substitutes:
MF	115	(Brazil) Vanderson	(substituted on) 88'
FW	117	(Brazil) Heliton	(substituted on) 73'
FW	118	(Brazil) Dennis	(substituted on) 58'
Coach:
(Brazil) Mazola Júnior

GK	1	(Brazil) Artur
DF	2	(Brazil) Tamaré	(substituted off) 46'
DF	3	(Brazil) André Nunes
DF	4	(Brazil) Márcio Santos	(yellow card) 75'
DF	6	(Brazil) Kaká
MF	5	(Brazil) Pedro Ayub (c)
MF	7	(Brazil) Matheuzinho
MF	8	(Brazil) Clécio	(yellow card) 10'
MF	10	(Brazil) Gilmar	(substituted off) 68'
FW	11	(Brazil) Alekito	(yellow card) 70'
FW	9	(Brazil) Marlon	(substituted off) 58'
Substitutes:
DF	14	(Brazil) Fernando	(substituted on) 46'
MF	15	(Brazil) Natan	(substituted on) 68'
FW	18	(Brazil) Alex	(substituted on) 58'
Coach:
(Brazil) Luís Carlos Carioca

Assistant referees:
Sandro do Nascimento Medeiros (Maranhão)
Rogério de Oliveira Braga (Piauí)
Fourth official:
Edmar Campos da Encarnação (Amazonas)
Fifth official:
Hélcio Araújo Neves (Pará)

=== Second leg ===
21 April 2014
17:00 BRT (UTC−3)

Brasília (Federal District (Brazil))	2–1	(Pará) Paysandu
Gilmar 39' (pen.); Alekito 54'	Report	Leandro Carvalho 84'
Penalties
Matheuzinho (penalty missed); Natan (penalty scored); Daniel (penalty scored); Rennan (penalty scored); Claudecir (penalty scored); Índio (penalty scored); Alekito (penalty scored); Fernando (penalty scored)	7–6	(penalty scored) Augusto Recife; (penalty scored) Yago Pikachu; (penalty scored) João Paulo; (penalty scored) Leandro Carvalho; (penalty missed) Lima; (penalty scored) Bruninho; (penalty scored) Djalma; (penalty missed) Heliton

Estádio Nacional Mané Garrincha, Brasília
Attendance: 51,701
Referee: Pablo dos Santos Alves (Espírito Santo)

**Brasília**	**Paysandu**

GK	1	(Brazil) Artur
DF	2	(Brazil) Fernando
DF	3	(Brazil) André Nunes
DF	4	(Brazil) Índio
DF	6	(Brazil) Kaká		(substituted off) 79'
MF	5	(Brazil) Pedro Ayub (c)		(yellow card) 71'
MF	7	(Brazil) Matheuzinho
MF	8	(Brazil) Clécio		(substituted off) 79'
MF	10	(Brazil) Gilmar		(substituted off) 65'
FW	11	(Brazil) Alekito		(yellow card) 41'
FW	9	(Brazil) Claudecir
Substitutes:
DF	14	(Brazil) Rennan		(substituted on) 79'
MF	15	(Brazil) Natan	(yellow card) 90'	(substituted on) 65'
MF	16	(Brazil) Daniel		(substituted on) 79'
Coach:
(Brazil) Luís Carlos Carioca

GK	101	(Brazil) Matheus
DF	102	(Brazil) Yago Pikachu	(yellow card) 31'
DF	103	(Brazil) Charles	(red card) 37'
DF	104	(Brazil) João Paulo
DF	106	(Brazil) Airton	(substituted off) 56'
MF	105	(Brazil) Augusto Recife
MF	107	(Brazil) Billy	(substituted off) 42'
MF	108	(Brazil) Zé Antônio (c)	(substituted off) 67'
MF	110	(Brazil) Bruninho
MF	111	(Brazil) Djalma
FW	109	(Brazil) Lima
Substitutes:
DF	114	(Brazil) Pablo	(substituted on) 42'
FW	117	(Brazil) Heliton	(substituted on) 67'
FW	118	(Brazil) Leandro Carvalho	(substituted on) 56'
Coach:
(Brazil) Mazola Júnior

Assistant referees:
Francisco Casimiro de Sousa (Tocantins)
Nilton Pereira da Silva (Roraima)
Fourth official:
Paulo Henrique Schleich Vollkopf (Mato Grosso do Sul)
Fifth official:
José Araújo Sabino (Distrito Federal)

== See also ==
- 2015 Copa Sudamericana
