= 2013 Campeonato Cearense =

Campeonato Cearense de Futebol
- Season: 2013
- Champions: Ceará
- Relegated: São Benedito; Maracanã
- Copa do Brasil: Ceará; Horizonte
- Série D: Tiradentes
- Matches played: 134
- Goals scored: 360 (2.69 per match)
- Top goalscorer: Giancarlo (Ferroviário) - 19 goals

The 2013 Campeonato Cearense de Futebol was the 99th season of top professional football league in the state of Ceará, Brazil. The competition began on January 5 and ended on May 19. Ceará won the championship for the 42nd time and 3rd since 2011, while São Benedito and Maracanã were relegated.

== Format ==
The championship has three stages. On the first stage, all teams excluding those who are playing in 2013 Copa do Nordeste play a double round robin. The best six teams qualifies to the second stage.

On the second stage, the teams are joined by the clubs from Ceará who were playing on Copa Nordeste. The teams then play a double round robin again, where the best four teams qualifies to the final stage. In the final stage, it's a playoff with four teams.

The champion and the best team on first stage qualifies to the 2014 Copa do Brasil. The champion and the runner-up qualify to the 2014 Copa do Nordeste. The best team who isn't on Campeonato Brasileiro Série A, Série B or Série C qualifies to Série D. The two worst teams in first stage will be relegated.

== Participating teams ==
Club	Home city	2012 result
Ceará	Fortaleza	1st
Crato	Crato	5th
Ferroviário	Fortaleza	9th
Fortaleza	Fortaleza	2nd
Guarani de Juazeiro	Juazeiro do Norte	6th
Guarany	Sobral	7th
Horizonte	Horizonte	3rd
Icasa	Juazeiro do Norte	8th
Maracanã	Maracanaú	1st (2nd division)
São Benedito	São Benedito	2nd (2nd division)
Tiradentes	Fortaleza	4th

== First stage ==
Pos	Team	Pld	W	D	L	GF	GA	GD	Pts	Qualification or relegation
1	Horizonte (A)	16	10	4	2	24	13	+11	34	Qualifies to the Second stage and 2014 Copa do Brasil
2	Ferroviário-CE (A)	16	9	3	4	30	17	+13	30	Qualify to the Second stage
3	Icasa (A)	16	7	4	5	24	19	+5	25	Qualify to the Second stage
4	Guarani de Juazeiro (A)	16	7	4	5	14	11	+3	25	Qualify to the Second stage
5	Tiradentes (A)	16	6	4	6	23	20	+3	22	Qualify to the Second stage
6	Guarany de Sobral (A)	16	6	4	6	21	22	−1	22	Qualify to the Second stage
7	Crato	16	3	6	7	20	24	−4	15	
8	São Benedito (R)	16	2	6	8	20	34	−14	12	Relegated
9	Maracanã (R)	16	2	5	9	10	26	−16	11	Relegated

(A) Advance to a further round; (R) Relegated

=== Results ===
Home \ Away	CTO	FER	GUJ	GNY	HOR	ICA	MAR	SBE	TIR
Crato		0–1	0–2	2–2	2–2	3–0	2–0	3–1	2–2
Ferroviário-CE	1–0		1–0	2–1	0–0	2–3	5–0	7–2	3–2
Guarani de Juazeiro	1–1	1–0		0–0	0–1	1–0	1–0	1–0	0–2
Guarany de Sobral	1–0	3–2	1–0		1–2	1–0	0–1	3–0	3–3
Horizonte	4–2	0–1	1–1	1–0		4–1	1–0	3–2	0–1
Icasa	1–0	1–1	2–2	6–1	0–1		3–0	0–0	1–0
Maracanã	2–2	0–1	0–1	2–1	1–1	0–2		1–1	0–0
São Benedito	1–1	3–3	1–0	1–1	0–1	2–3	3–3		1–0
Tiradentes	3–0	1–0	1–3	0–2	1–2	1–1	2–0	4–2	

Legend: Blue = home team win; Yellow = draw; Red = away team win.

== Second stage ==
The six teams from the First stage are joined by Ceará and Fortaleza who were playing on 2013 Copa do Nordeste.

Pos	Team	Pld	W	D	L	GF	GA	GD	Pts	Qualification
1	Icasa (A)	14	9	1	4	24	16	+8	28	Qualifies to the Final stage
2	Ceará (A)	14	8	2	4	27	14	+13	26	Qualifies to the Final stage
3	Fortaleza (A)	14	8	2	4	21	13	+8	26	Qualifies to the Final stage
4	Guarany de Sobral (A)	14	7	1	6	21	19	+2	22	Qualifies to the Final stage
5	Tiradentes	14	6	4	4	21	21	0	22	
6	Horizonte	14	5	4	5	18	17	+1	19	
7	Guarani de Juazeiro	14	3	0	11	13	31	−18	9	
8	Ferroviário-CE	14	2	2	10	10	24	−14	8	

Rules for classification: 1) points; 2) goal difference; 3) number of goals scored.
(A) Advance to a further round

=== Results ===
Home \ Away	CEA	FER	FOR	GUJ	GNY	HOR	ICA	TIR
Ceará		1–0	2–0	4–1	1–2	0–0	3–1	2–2
Ferroviário-CE	0–2		2–2	2–1	1–2	1–4	2–4	0–1
Fortaleza	0–1	1–0		1–2	2–1	1–0	3–0	2–2
Guarani de Juazeiro	3–2	0–1	2–1		0–3	0–1	0–3	1–2
Guarany de Sobral	3–2	3–0	0–1	2–1		1–3	0–1	1–0
Horizonte	0–3	1–0	1–2	3–0	2–2		0–1	2–2
Icasa	2–0	1–0	0–2	4–2	2–0	1–1		3–0
Tiradentes	0–4	1–1	0–3	2–0	3–1	3–0	3–1	

Legend: Blue = home team win; Yellow = draw; Red = away team win.

== Final stage ==
Semifinals
1	Icasa	0	4	4
4	Guarany de Sobral	3	1	4 (a.g.)
2	Ceará	3	3	6
3	Fortaleza	2	1	3

Finals
4	Guarany de Sobral	1	1	2
2	Ceará	1	1	2

=== Semifinals ===
==== First leg ====
May 5, 2013
16:00 UTC−03:00

Guarany de Sobral	3–0	Icasa

Estádio do Junco, Sobral

May 5, 2013
16:00 UTC−03:00

Fortaleza	0–3	Ceará

Estádio Presidente Vargas, Fortaleza

==== Second leg ====
May 12, 2013
16:00 UTC−03:00

Icasa	4–1	Guarany de Sobral

Romeirão, Juazeiro do Norte

May 12, 2013
16:00 UTC−03:00

Ceará	3–1	Fortaleza

Castelão, Fortaleza

=== Finals ===
May 15, 2013
21:50 UTC−03:00

Guarany de Sobral	1–1	Ceará
Maciel 1'		Mota 52'

Estádio do Junco, Sobral
Referee: Wladyerisson Silva

May 19, 2013
16:00 UTC−03:00

Ceará	1–1	Guarany de Sobral
Mota 12'		Luiz Carlos 4'

Castelão, Fortaleza
Attendance: 50,511
Referee: Avelar Rodrigo da Silva

Ceará Sporting Club won due to better campaign.
