= 2019 Campeonato Mineiro =

105th season of Mineiro's top professional football league

Campeonato Mineiro
- Season: 2019
- Champions: Cruzeiro
- Relegated: Guarani de Divinópolis; Tupi
- Matches played: 74
- Goals scored: 189 (2.55 per match)
- Top goalscorer: Fred (12 goals)

The 2019 Campeonato Mineiro was the 105th season of Mineiro's top professional football league. The competition began on January 19 and ended on April 3. Cruzeiro are the defending champions, having won their 38th title by defeating Atlético Mineiro.

== Format ==
=== First stage ===
The 2019 Módulo I first stage was played by 12 clubs in a single round-robin, with all teams playing each other once. The eight best-placed teams qualified for the final stage and the bottom two teams were relegated to the 2020 Módulo II.

The league also selects Minas Gerais's representatives in the Campeonato Brasileiro Série D and the Copa do Brasil. The three best-placed teams not already qualified for the 2019 seasons of the Série A, Série B or Série C, earn places in the 2020 Série D. The four best-placed teams qualify for the 2020 Copa do Brasil. Should a team qualify for the cup by other means, their entry is passed down to the next best-placed team.

=== Knockout stage ===
The knockout stage was played between the 8 best-placed teams from the previous stage, with the quarterfinals played in a one-legged tie and the semifinals and finals played in a two-legged tie. The quarterfinals were hosted by the better placing team in the first stage. In the semifinals, the best-placed team in the first stage of each contest has the right to choose whether to play its home game in the first or second leg. The away goals rule is not in effect, and should two teams be level on aggregate after both legs, the team who placed better in the first stage advances.

== Participating teams ==
Team	Home city	Manager	2018 result
América Mineiro	Belo Horizonte	Givanildo Oliveira	3rd
Atlético Mineiro	Belo Horizonte	Levir Culpi	2nd
Boa Esporte	Varginha	Tuca Guimarães	7th
Caldense	Poços de Caldas	Mauro Fernandes	9th
Cruzeiro	Belo Horizonte	Mano Menezes	1st
Guarani	Divinópolis	Gian Rodrigues	1st (Módulo II)
Patrocinense	Patrocínio	Rodrigo Fonseca	8th
Tombense	Tombos	Ricardo Drubscky	5th
Tupi	Juiz de Fora	Beto Sousa	4th
Tupynambás	Juiz de Fora	Paulo Campos	2nd (Módulo II)
URT	Patos de Minas	Ito Roque	6th
Villa Nova	Nova Lima	Eugênio Souza	10th

== First stage ==
Pos	Team	Pld	W	D	L	GF	GA	GD	Pts	Qualification or relegation
1	Atlético Mineiro	11	9	1	1	24	6	+18	28	Knockout stage
2	Cruzeiro	11	7	4	0	22	5	+17	25	Knockout stage
3	América Mineiro	11	6	4	1	22	9	+13	22	Knockout stage
4	Boa Esporte	11	5	3	3	21	16	+5	18	Knockout stage and 2020 Série D
5	Tombense	11	3	4	4	11	11	0	13	Knockout stage and 2020 Série D
6	Caldense	11	3	4	4	11	12	−1	13	Knockout stage and 2020 Série D
7	Patrocinense	11	3	3	5	10	13	−3	12	Knockout stage
8	Tupynambás	11	3	2	6	10	18	−8	11	Knockout stage
9	Villa Nova	11	3	2	6	9	21	−12	11	
10	URT	11	2	4	5	9	16	−7	10	
11	Guarani	11	1	7	3	8	13	−5	10	2020 Módulo II
12	Tupi	11	0	4	7	6	23	−17	4	2020 Módulo II

Updated to match(es) played on 20 March 2019. Source:
Rules for classification: 1) Points; 2) Wins; 3) Goal difference; 4) Goals scored; 5) Head-to-head results; 6) Fewest red cards received; 7) Fewest yellow cards received; 8) Draw.

== Knockout stage ==
=== Bracket ===
Quarter-final
Atlético Mineiro	3
Tupynambás	1
Boa Esporte	1 (3)
Tombense	1 (0)
Cruzeiro	5
Patrocinense	0
América Mineiro	2
Caldense	0

Semi-final
Atlético Mineiro	0	5	5
Boa Esporte	0	0	0
Cruzeiro	3	3	6
América Mineiro	2	0	2

Final
Atlético	1	1	2
Cruzeiro	2	1	3

=== Quarterfinals ===
==== Quarterfinal 1 ====
March 23, 2019
16:00 UTC−03:00

Atlético Mineiro	3 – 1	Tupynambás
Juan Cazares 29', 63'; Ricardo Oliveira 82'	Report	Ademilson 72' (pen.)

Mineirão, Belo Horizonte
Attendance: 46,924
Referee: Emerson De Almeida Ferreira

==== Quarterfinal 2 ====
March 23, 2019
19:00 UTC−03:00

Cruzeiro	5 – 0	Patrocinense
Fred 8'; Rodriguinho 23', 75'; Marquinhos Gabriel 47', 49'	Report

Mineirão, Belo Horizonte
Attendance: 19,998
Referee: Ronei Candido Alves

==== Quarterfinal 3 ====
March 25, 2019
20:00 UTC−03:00

América Mineiro	2 – 0	Caldense
Matheusinho 83'; João Paulo 90+2'	Report

Independência, Belo Horizonte
Attendance: 2,267
Referee: Felipe Fernandes de Lima

==== Quarterfinal 4 ====
March 23, 2019
21:00 UTC−03:00

Boa Esporte	1 – 1	Tombense
Gustavo Henrique 8'	Report	Everton 38'
Penalties
Gindré (penalty scored); Chiquinho Alagoano (penalty scored); Ferreira (penalty scored)	3 – 0	(penalty missed) Bruninho; (penalty missed) Bruno Ferreira; (penalty missed) Vander

Melão, Varginha
Referee: Ricardo Marques Ribeiro

=== Semifinals ===
==== Semifinal 1 ====
March 30, 2019
18:00 UTC−03:00

Boa Esporte	0 – 0	Atlético Mineiro
	Report

Melão, Varginha

April 7, 2019
16:00 UTC−03:00

Atlético Mineiro	5 – 0	Boa Esporte
Luan 25'; Elias 41'; Victor 45+4' (o.g.); Geuvânio 47'; Vinícius Goes 74'

Mineirão, Belo Horizonte

==== Semifinal 2 ====
March 31, 2019
16:00 UTC−03:00

América Mineiro	2 – 3	Cruzeiro
Diego Jussani 57'; Jonatas Belusso 84'	Report	Fred 18', 52', 71'

Independência, Belo Horizonte

April 6, 2019
19:00 UTC−03:00

Cruzeiro	3 – 0	América Mineiro
Léo 15'; Fred 20'; Rafinha 88'	Report

Mineirão, Belo Horizonte

=== Finals ===
14 April 2019
16:00 (UTC−03:00)

Cruzeiro	2 – 1	Atlético Mineiro
Marquinhos Gabriel 45+1'; Léo 61'		Ricardo Oliveira 56'

Mineirão
Attendance: 51.032
Referee: Wagner do Nascimento

20 April 2019
16:30 (UTC−03:00)

Atlético Mineiro	1 – 1	Cruzeiro
Elias 30'		Fred 79' (pen.)

Independência
Referee: Leandro Bizzio Marinho

== Goalscorers ==
Rank	Player	Club	Goals
1	(Brazil) Fred	Cruzeiro	12
2	(Brazil) Ademilson	Tupynambás	8
3	(Brazil) Ricardo Oliveira	Atlético Mineiro	7
4	(Brazil) Gindré	Boa Esporte	6
4	(Brazil) Gustavo Henrique	Boa Esporte	6
