= 2012 Campeonato Brasileiro Série C =

Campeonato Brasileiro de Clubes da Série C
- Season: 2012
- Champions: Oeste
- Promoted: Chapecoense; Icasa; Oeste; Paysandu
- Relegated: Guarany; Tupi; Salgueiro; Santo André
- Matches: 195
- Goals: 495 (2.54 per match)
- Top goalscorer: Dênis Marques (Santa Cruz) - 11 goals
- Average attendance: 842,596

The 2012 Campeonato Brasileiro Série C, the third level of the Brazilian League, would be contested by 20 clubs from May 27 until November 4, 2012. Top four teams in the table will qualify to the Campeonato Brasileiro Série B to be contested in 2013, meanwhile the bottom four will be relegated to Campeonato Brasileiro Série D.

Due to legal issues, the STJD suspended the Série C and Série D until the issues were settled. After 32 days, the CBF confirmed that the Série C started at June 30 and ended on December 1.

== Rule changes ==
Unlike previous years, in 2012 participating clubs will be divided in two groups of 10, instead of the four groups of five clubs, the system adopted by 2011. Thus, all teams will be involved in the tournament until the end of the year. The amendment will allow all clubs in the competition to play at least 18 games in the tournament. The top of each group will advance to the knockout stage for the decisive stages of the quarterfinals, semifinals and final. The semifinalists will be promoted to the Series B 2013.

== Teams ==
Team	Home city	Stadium	Capacity
Águia	Marabá	Zinho de Oliveira	5,500
Brasiliense	Brasília	Boca do Jacaré	30,000
Caxias	Caxias do Sul	Centenário	30,800
Chapecoense	Chapecó	Arena Condá	25,000
Cuiabá	Cuiabá	Verdão	40,000
Duque de Caxias	Duque de Caxias	Marrentão	7,000
Fortaleza	Fortaleza	Presidente Vargas	20,600
Guarany	Sobral	Junco	10,000
Icasa	Juazeiro do Norte	Romeirão	16,000
Luverdense	Lucas do Rio Verde	Passo das Emas Stadium	15,000
Macaé	Macaé	Moacyzão	15,000
Madureira	Rio de Janeiro	Conselheiro Galvão	10,000
Oeste	Itápolis	Amaros	16,000
Paysandu	Belém	Curuzú	20,000
Salgueiro	Salgueiro	Salgueirão	10,000
Santa Cruz	Recife	Arruda	60,000
Santo André	Santo André	Bruno José Daniel	18,000
Treze	Campina Grande	Presidente Vargas	10,000
Tupi	Juiz de Fora	Mário Helênio	40,000
Vila Nova	Goiânia	Serra Dourada	50,000

== First stage ==
=== Group A ===
Pos	Team	Pld	W	D	L	GF	GA	GD	Pts	Qualification or relegation
1	Fortaleza	18	11	6	1	28	11	+17	39	Advances to Final Stage
2	Luverdense	18	10	4	4	32	26	+6	34	Advances to Final Stage
3	Icasa	18	7	3	8	18	19	−1	24	Advances to Final Stage
4	Paysandu	18	5	9	4	26	19	+7	24	Advances to Final Stage
5	Treze	18	7	1	10	24	33	−9	22	
6	Santa Cruz	18	5	7	6	26	22	+4	22	
7	Águia de Marabá	18	5	7	6	22	32	−10	22	
8	Cuiabá	18	4	8	6	20	21	−1	20	
9	Salgueiro	18	4	8	6	25	29	−4	20	Relegation to Série D
10	Guarany de Sobral	18	3	5	10	21	30	−9	14	Relegation to Série D

==== Matches ====
Home \ Away	AGM	CUI	FOR	GUA	ICA	LUV	PAY	SAL	STC	TRE
Águia de Marabá		2–1	0–0	2–1	1–0	2–2	1–1	2–2	1–0	5–1
Cuiabá	3–1		0–0	2–1	0–0	0–2	1–1	1–1	0–0	5–1
Fortaleza	0–0	3–0		4–1	1–0	3–3	3–1	2–1	2–0	2–1
Guarany	3–1	3–4	1–1		1–2	0–1	1–2	2–0	1–1	2–0
Icasa	2–1	0–0	0–2	1–0		0–1	1–0	2–0	3–1	3–0
Luverdense	5–1	1–0	2–0	1–1	2–1		2–2	3–2	2–1	0–2
Paysandu	0–0	2–1	0–1	1–1	1–1	2–0		4–0	0–0	5–1
Salgueiro	1–1	2–2	0–0	3–0	2–1	6–2	1–1		2–2	2–0
Santa Cruz	6–1	1–0	1–2	1–1	4–0	2–1	3–3	0–0		2–1
Treze	4–0	0–0	0–2	3–1	2–1	1–2	1–0	4–0	2–1	

Legend: Blue = home team win; Yellow = draw; Red = away team win.

=== Group B ===
Pos	Team	Pld	W	D	L	GF	GA	GD	Pts	Qualification or relegation
1	Macaé	18	9	5	4	33	17	+16	32	Advances to Final Stage
2	Duque de Caxias	18	9	2	7	22	23	−1	29	Advances to Final Stage
3	Chapecoense	18	8	5	5	24	12	+12	29	Advances to Final Stage
4	Oeste	18	8	5	5	22	19	+3	29	Advances to Final Stage
5	Caxias	18	8	3	7	23	26	−3	27	
6	Brasiliense	18	7	2	9	25	29	−4	23	
7	Vila Nova	18	6	5	7	27	26	+1	23	
8	Madureira	18	6	5	7	17	21	−4	23	
9	Santo André	18	3	9	6	14	22	−8	18	Relegation to Série D
10	Tupi	18	3	5	10	13	25	−12	14	Relegation to Série D

==== Matches ====
Home \ Away	BRS	CAX	CHA	DCA	MAC	MAD	OES	STA	TUP	VIL
Brasiliense		2–1	1–1	3–2	1–3	2–0	3–2	1–2	2–1	4–2
Caxias	3–0		2–0	0–1	0–4	2–0	3–2	0–0	1–0	2–1
Chapecoense	3–0	4–0		3–1	1–1	1–0	1–0	0–0	5–0	3–2
Duque de Caxias	1–0	2–1	0–1		2–1	0–2	0–0	3–2	2–1	1–1
Macaé	2–2	4–1	0–0	2–1		0–0	0–2	3–1	4–2	3–0
Madureira	1–0	1–1	2–1	1–2	2–1		1–1	1–1	1–0	3–1
Oeste	2–1	1–2	1–0	1–0	1–1	0–0		2–1	1–0	3–1
Santo André	0–3	2–1	0–0	0–1	0–3	1–0	1–1		1–1	0–0
Tupi	2–0	2–2	1–0	0–2	0–1	2–1	0–1	0–0		1–1
Vila Nova	1–0	0–1	1–0	4–1	1–0	5–1	4–1	2–2	0–0	

Legend: Blue = home team win; Yellow = draw; Red = away team win.

== Final stage ==
Quarterfinals
Fortaleza	1	1	2
Oeste	1	3	4
Luverdense	0	1	1
Chapecoense	3	0	3
Duque de Caxias	1	0	1
Icasa	2	0	2
Macaé	0	3	3
Paysandu	2	2	4

Semifinals
Oeste	1	0	1
Chapecoense	0	0	0
Icasa (a)	2	2	4
Paysandu	3	1	4

Finals
Oeste	0	2	2
Icasa	0	0	0

== Top goalscorers ==
Goals	Player	Team
11	(Brazil) Denis Marques	Santa Cruz
10	(Brazil) Rubinho	Luverdense
9	(Brazil) Pedro Júnior	Vila Nova
8	(Brazil) Jones	Macaé
8	(Brazil) Zambi	Macaé
7	(Brazil) Bruno Veiga	Duque de Caxias
7	(Brazil) Wal	Fortaleza
