= 2013 Campeonato Brasileiro Série D =

Campeonato Brasileiro Série D
- Season: 2013
- Champions: Botafogo-PB
- Promoted: Botafogo-PB; Juventude; Salgueiro; Tupi
- Matches: 190
- Goals: 475 (2.5 per match)
- Top goalscorer: Ademilson (12 goals)

The 2013 Campeonato Brasileiro Série D was the fifth edition of the Campeonato Brasileiro Serie D, the fourth division of the Brazilian League.

It was contested by 40 clubs, four of which were promoted to the 2014 Campeonato Brasileiro Série C.

== Competition format ==
The 40 teams are divided in eight groups of 5, playing within them in a double round-robin format. The two best ranked in each group at the end of 10 rounds will qualify to the Second Stage, which will be played in home-and-away system. Winners advance to Third Stage. The quarterfinal winners will be promoted to the Série C 2014. As there is no Série E, or fifth division, technically there will be no relegation. However, teams who were not promoted will have to re-qualify for Série D 2014 through their respective state leagues.
The competition can also be considered as 4 mini-tournaments (Group 1+2;3+4;5+6;7+8) because according to the playoff-structure, exactly one team of each "mini-tournament" will be promoted.

== Participating teams ==
State	Team	Qualification method
(Acre (state)) Acre	Plácido de Castro	2013 Campeonato Acriano champions
Alagoas	CSA	2013 Campeonato Alagoano best record
Amapá	Ypiranga (AP)	2012 Campeonato Amapaense runners-up
(Amazonas (Brazilian state)) Amazonas	Nacional	2012 Campeonato Amazonense champions
Bahia	Juazeirense	2013 Campeonato Baiano best record
Bahia	Vitória da Conquista	2012 Copa Governador champions
Ceará	Tiradentes	2013 Campeonato Cearense best record
(Federal District (Brazil)) Distrito Federal	Brasília	2013 Campeonato Brasiliense runners-up
Espírito Santo	Aracruz	2013 Campeonato Capixaba best record after 1st Phase
Goiás	Goianésia	2013 Campeonato Goiano best record
Goiás	Aparecidense	2013 Campeonato Goiano 2nd best record
Maranhão	Maranhão	2012 Campeonato Maranhense runner-up
Mato Grosso	Mixto	2013 Campeonato Mato-Grossense runner-up
Mato Grosso do Sul	Águia Negra	2012 Campeonato Sul-Mato-Grossense champions
Minas Gerais	Villa Nova	2013 Campeonato Mineiro best record
Minas Gerais	Araxá	2013 Campeonato Mineiro 2nd best record
Pará	Paragominas	2013 Campeonato Paraense best record
Paraíba	Botafogo (PB)	2013 Campeonato Paraibano champions
(Paraná (state)) Paraná	Londrina	2013 Campeonato Paranaense best record
(Paraná (state)) Paraná	J. Malucelli	2013 Campeonato Paranaense 2nd best record
Pernambuco	Ypiranga (PE)	2013 Campeonato Pernambucano best record
Pernambuco	Central	2013 Campeonato Pernambucano 2nd best record
Piauí	Parnahyba	2013 Campeonato Piauiense champion
(Rio de Janeiro (state)) Rio de Janeiro	Resende	2013 Campeonato Carioca best record
(Rio de Janeiro (state)) Rio de Janeiro	Nova Iguaçu	2012 Copa Rio champions
Rio Grande do Norte	Potiguar	2013 Campeonato Potiguar champions
Rio Grande do Sul	Lajeadense	2013 Campeonato Gaúcho best record
Rio Grande do Sul	Juventude	2012 Copa FGF champions
Rondônia	Genus	2013 Campeonato Rondoniense best record
Roraima	Náutico	2013 Campeonato Roraimense champions
(São Paulo (state)) São Paulo	Botafogo (SP)	2013 Campeonato Paulista best record
(São Paulo (state)) São Paulo	Penapolense	2013 Campeonato Paulista 2nd best record
(Santa Catarina (state)) Santa Catarina	Metropolitano	2013 Campeonato Catarinense best record
(Santa Catarina (state)) Santa Catarina	Marcílio Dias	2012 Copa Santa Catarina 2nd best record
Sergipe	Sergipe	2013 Campeonato Sergipano champions
Tocantins	Gurupi	2012 Campeonato Tocantinense champions
Brazil	Salgueiro	2012 Série C Relegated (9th - Group A)
Brazil	Guarany	2012 Série C Relegated (10th - Group A)
Brazil	Santo André	2012 Série C Relegated (9th - Group B)
Brazil	Tupi	2012 Série C Relegated (10th - Group B)

== First stage ==
Key to colours in group tables
Group winners, runners-up advance to the Round of 16
Teams eliminated from the competition

=== Group 1 (AC-AM-PA-RO-RR) ===
Team	Pld	W	D	L	GF	GA	GD	Pts
(Amazonas (Brazilian state)) Nacional-AM	8	5	0	3	21	14	+7	15
(Acre (state)) Plácido de Castro	8	4	1	3	9	12	−3	13
(Pará) Paragominas	8	5	2	1	15	7	+8	11^{1}
(Roraima) Náutico-RR	8	2	1	5	11	16	−5	7
(Rondônia) Genus	8	1	2	5	11	18	−7	5

^{1} Six points deducted for use of irregular player.

=== Group 2 (AP-MA-PE-PI-TO) ===
Team	Pld	W	D	L	GF	GA	GD	Pts
(Tocantins) Gurupi	8	5	0	3	12	16	−4	15
(Pernambuco) Salgueiro	8	4	3	1	16	7	+9	15
(Piauí) Parnahyba	8	3	2	3	9	10	−1	11
Maranhão	8	2	3	3	13	10	+3	9
(Amapá) Ypiranga-AP	8	1	2	5	6	13	−7	5

=== Group 3 (CE-PE-RN) ===
Team	Pld	W	D	L	GF	GA	GD	Pts
(Ceará) Tiradentes	8	6	1	1	13	2	+11	19
(Pernambuco) Central	8	4	1	3	8	4	+4	13
(Ceará) Guarany de Sobral	8	3	3	2	8	8	0	12
(Pernambuco) Ypiranga-PE	8	3	1	4	9	11	−2	10
(Rio Grande do Norte) Potiguar	8	0	2	6	3	16	−13	2

=== Group 4 (AL-BA-PB-SE) ===
Team	Pld	W	D	L	GF	GA	GD	Pts
(Paraíba) Botafogo-PB	8	5	2	1	14	7	+7	17
Sergipe	8	5	1	2	16	7	+9	16
(Bahia) Vitória da Conquista	8	3	2	3	6	7	−1	11
(Bahia) Juazeirense	8	2	2	4	8	16	−8	8
(Alagoas) CSA	8	1	1	6	6	13	−7	4

=== Group 5 (DF-GO-MT-MS) ===
Team	Pld	W	D	L	GF	GA	GD	Pts
(Mato Grosso) Mixto	8	5	1	2	7	4	+3	16
(Goiás) Aparecidense	8	4	3	1	11	4	+7	15
(Goiás) Goianésia	8	3	1	4	10	10	0	10
(Mato Grosso do Sul) Águia Negra	8	2	3	3	8	12	−4	9
(Federal District (Brazil)) Brasília	8	1	2	5	8	14	−6	5

=== Group 6 (ES-MG-RJ) ===
Team	Pld	W	D	L	GF	GA	GD	Pts
(Minas Gerais) Tupi	8	7	0	1	17	8	+9	21
(Rio de Janeiro (state)) Resende	8	4	2	2	11	6	+5	14
(Rio de Janeiro (state)) Nova Iguaçu	8	2	3	3	8	9	−1	9
(Espírito Santo) Aracruz	8	1	3	4	8	14	−6	6
(Minas Gerais) Araxá	8	1	2	5	5	12	−7	5

=== Group 7 (MG-RS-SC-SP) ===
Team	Pld	W	D	L	GF	GA	GD	Pts
(Rio Grande do Sul) Juventude	8	5	0	3	9	7	+2	15
(São Paulo (state)) Santo André	8	4	2	2	11	8	+3	14
(Santa Catarina (state)) Marcílio Dias	8	3	2	3	10	9	+1	11
(São Paulo (state)) Penapolense	8	3	0	5	8	9	−1	9
(Minas Gerais) Villa Nova	8	2	2	4	6	11	−5	8

=== Group 8 (PR-RS-SC-SP) ===
Team	Pld	W	D	L	GF	GA	GD	Pts
(Santa Catarina (state)) Metropolitano	8	4	1	3	11	8	+3	13
(Paraná (state)) Londrina	8	4	1	3	9	9	0	13
(Paraná (state)) J. Malucelli	8	2	4	2	14	13	+1	10
(São Paulo (state)) Botafogo-SP	8	2	3	3	8	7	+1	9
(Rio Grande do Sul) Lajeadense	8	2	3	3	8	13	−5	9

== Final Stage ==
Round of 16
(Amazonas (Brazilian state)) Nacional-AM	0	2	2
(Pernambuco) Salgueiro (a)	0	2	2
(Acre (state)) Plácido de Castro (a)	1	1	2
(Tocantins) Gurupi	0	2	2
(Ceará) Tiradentes (a)	2	0	2
Sergipe	2	0	2
(Pernambuco) Central	3	1	4 (3)
(Paraíba) Botafogo-PB (p)	1	3	4 (5)
(Mato Grosso) Mixto (a)	2	0	2
(Rio de Janeiro (state)) Resende	1	1	2
(Goiás) Aparecidense (a)*	1	2	3
(Minas Gerais) Tupi	1	2	3
(Rio Grande do Sul) Juventude	0	3	3
(Paraná (state)) Londrina	1	1	2
(São Paulo (state)) Santo André	0	1	1
(Santa Catarina (state)) Metropolitano	0	2	2

Quarterfinals
(Pernambuco) Salgueiro	1	3	4
(Acre (state)) Plácido de Castro	1	1	2
(Ceará) Tiradentes	1	0	1
(Paraíba) Botafogo-PB	2	1	3
(Mato Grosso) Mixto	1	2	3
(Minas Gerais) Tupi	1	3	4
(Rio Grande do Sul) Juventude (a)	2	0	2
(Santa Catarina (state)) Metropolitano	2	0	2

Semifinals
(Pernambuco) Salgueiro	1	0	1
(Paraíba) Botafogo-PB	2	2	4
(Minas Gerais) Tupi	0	1	1
(Rio Grande do Sul) Juventude	4	0	4

Finals
(Paraíba) Botafogo-PB	1	2	3
(Rio Grande do Sul) Juventude	2	0	2

^{*} Aparecidense was excluded by the STJD, because in the second leg against Tupi, the Aparecidense's physio Ramildo De Silva invaded the field to save a goal at the 89th minute.

=== Finals ===
October 27, 2013
17:00 UTC−2

Juventude	2 – 1	Botafogo-PB
Zulu 3'; Paulo Josué 68'	Report	Rafael Aidar 49'

Arena Grêmio, Porto Alegre
Attendance: 4,024
Referee: Raphael Claus

November 3, 2013
17:00 UTC−2

Botafogo-PB	2 – 0	Juventude
Larramendi 21'; Rafael Aidar 90+1'	Report

Almeidão, João Pessoa
Attendance: 19,619
Referee: Felipe Gomes da Silva
