= 2013 in Brazilian football =

Football in Brazil
- Season: 2013

Men's football
- Série A: Cruzeiro
- Série B: Palmeiras
- Série C: Santa Cruz
- Série D: Botafogo PB
- Copa do Brasil: Flamengo

The following article presents a summary of the 2013 football (soccer) season in Brazil, which is the 112th season of competitive football in the country.

== Campeonato Brasileiro Série A ==
The 2013 Campeonato Brasileiro Série A started on May 26, 2013, and concluded on December 8, 2013.

Pos	Team	Pld	W	D	L	GF	GA	GD	Pts	Qualification or relegation
1	Cruzeiro (C)	38	23	7	8	77	37	+40	76	2014 Copa Libertadores Second Stage (Note: Atlético Mineiro is qualified for the second stage of the 2014 Copa Libertadores as the 2013 Copa Libertadores champion. Flamengo is qualified for the second stage of the 2014 Copa Libertadores as the 2013 Copa do Brasil champion.)
2	Grêmio	38	18	11	9	42	35	+7	65	2014 Copa Libertadores Second Stage
3	Atlético Paranaense	38	18	10	10	65	49	+16	64	2014 Copa Libertadores First Stage
4	Botafogo	38	17	10	11	55	41	+14	61	2014 Copa Libertadores First Stage
5	Vitória	38	16	11	11	59	53	+6	59	
6	Goiás	38	16	11	11	48	44	+4	59	
7	Santos	38	15	12	11	51	38	+13	57	
8	Atlético Mineiro	38	15	12	11	49	38	+11	57	2014 Copa Libertadores Second Stage
9	São Paulo	38	14	8	16	39	40	−1	50	
10	Corinthians	38	11	17	10	27	22	+5	50	
11	Coritiba	38	12	12	14	42	45	−3	48	
12	Bahia	38	12	12	14	37	45	−8	48	
13	Internacional	38	11	15	12	51	52	−1	48	
14	Criciúma	38	13	7	18	49	63	−14	46	
15	Fluminense	38	12	10	16	43	47	−4	46	
16	Flamengo	38	12	13	13	43	46	−3	45 (Note: Flamengo and Portuguesa were punished for selecting suspended players in Round 38. Each club lost 4 points.)	2014 Copa Libertadores Second Stage
17	Portuguesa (R)	38	12	12	14	50	46	+4	44	Relegation to Série B
18	Vasco da Gama (R)	38	11	11	16	50	61	−11	44	Relegation to Série B
19	Ponte Preta (R)	38	9	10	19	37	55	−18	37	Relegation to Série B
20	Náutico (R)	38	5	5	28	22	79	−57	20	Relegation to Série B

Updated to match(es) played on unknown. Source: Soccerway.com
Rules for classification: 1st points; 2nd wins; 3rd goal difference; 4th goals scored; 5th head-to-head results; 6th least red cards received; 7th least yellow cards received; 8th draw.
(C) Champions; (R) Relegated
Notes:

Cruzeiro declared as the Campeonato Brasileiro Série A champions.

=== Relegation ===
The four worst placed teams, which are Portuguesa, Vasco da Gama, Ponte Preta and Náutico, were relegated to the following year's second level.

== Campeonato Brasileiro Série B ==
The 2013 Campeonato Brasileiro Série B started on May 24, 2013, and concluded on November 30, 2013.

Pos	Team	Pld	W	D	L	GF	GA	GD	Pts	Promotion or relegation
1	Palmeiras (C, P)	38	24	7	7	71	28	+43	79	Promotion to 2014 Série A
2	Chapecoense (P)	38	20	12	6	60	31	+29	72	Promotion to 2014 Série A
3	Sport (P)	38	20	3	15	64	56	+8	63	Promotion to 2014 Série A
4	Figueirense (P)	38	18	6	14	63	52	+11	60	Promotion to 2014 Série A
5	Icasa	38	18	5	15	50	54	−4	59	
6	Joinville	38	17	8	13	58	44	+14	59	
7	Ceará	38	16	11	11	60	50	+10	59	
8	Paraná	38	16	9	13	55	39	+16	57	
9	América-MG	38	14	15	9	51	42	+9	57	
10	Avaí	38	16	8	14	49	46	+3	56	
11	Boa Esporte	38	13	11	14	33	46	−13	50	
12	Bragantino	38	13	8	17	37	43	−6	47	
13	América-RN	38	11	14	13	48	56	−8	47	
14	ABC	38	13	7	18	45	58	−13	46	
15	Oeste	38	11	13	14	44	58	−14	46	
16	Atlético Goianiense	38	12	8	18	42	51	−9	44	
17	Guaratinguetá (R)	38	11	8	19	42	54	−12	41	Relegation to 2014 Série C
18	Paysandu (R)	38	10	10	18	40	56	−16	40	Relegation to 2014 Série C
19	São Caetano (R)	38	9	9	20	45	59	−14	36	Relegation to 2014 Série C
20	ASA (R)	38	11	2	25	41	75	−34	35	Relegation to 2014 Série C

Updated to match(es) played on unknown. Source: Soccerway.com
Rules for classification: 1st points; 2nd wins; 3rd goal difference; 4th goals scored; 5th head-to-head results; 6th least red cards received; 7th least yellow cards received; 8th draw.
(C) Champions; (P) Promoted; (R) Relegated

Palmeiras declared as the Campeonato Brasileiro Série B champions.

=== Promotion ===
The four best placed teams, which are Palmeiras, Chapecoense, Sport and Figueirense, were promoted to the following year's first level.

=== Relegation ===
The four worst placed teams, which are Guaratinguetá, Paysandu, São Caetano and ASA, were relegated to the following year's third level.

== Campeonato Brasileiro Série C ==
The 2013 Campeonato Brasileiro Série C started on June 1, 2013, and is scheduled to end on December 1, 2013.

- Águia de Marabá
- Baraúnas
- Barueri
- Betim
- Brasiliense
- Caxias
- CRAC
- CRB
- Cuiabá
- Duque de Caxias
- Fortaleza
- Guarani
- Luverdense
- Macaé
- Madureira
- Mogi Mirim
- Rio Branco
- Sampaio Corrêa
- Santa Cruz
- Treze
- Vila Nova

The Campeonato Brasileiro Série C final was played between Santa Cruz and Sampaio Corrêa.

November 24, 2013

Sampaio Corrêa	0–0	Santa Cruz

Castelão

December 1, 2013

Santa Cruz	2–1	Sampaio Corrêa

Estádio do Arruda

Santa Cruz declared as the league champions by aggregate score of 2–1.

=== Promotion ===
The four best placed teams, which are Santa Cruz, Sampaio Corrêa, Luverdense, and Vila Nova, were promoted to the following year's second level.

=== Relegation ===
The five worst placed teams, which are Baraúnas, Barueri, Brasiliense, CRAC and Rio Branco, were relegated to the following year's fourth level.

== Campeonato Brasileiro Série D ==
The 2013 Campeonato Brasileiro Série D started on June 1, 2013, and concluded on November 3, 2013.

- Águia Negra
- Aparecidense
- Aracruz
- Araxá
- Botafogo (PB)
- Botafogo (SP)
- Brasília
- Central
- CSA
- Genus
- Goianésia
- Guarany de Sobral
- Gurupi
- J. Malucelli
- Juazeirense
- Juventude
- Lajeadense
- Londrina
- Maranhão
- Marcílio Dias
- Metropolitano
- Mixto
- Nacional (AM)
- Náutico (RR)
- Nova Iguaçu
- Paragominas
- Parnahyba
- Penapolense
- Plácido de Castro
- Potiguar
- Resende
- Salgueiro
- Santo André
- Sergipe
- Tiradentes
- Tupi
- Villa Nova
- Vitória da Conquista
- Ypiranga (AP)
- Ypiranga (PE)

The Campeonato Brasileiro Série D final was played between Botafogo (PB) and Juventude.

October 27, 2013

Juventude	2–1	Botafogo (PB)

Arena Grêmio

November 3, 2013

Botafogo (PB)	2–0	Juventude

Almeidão

Botafogo (PB) declared as the league champions by aggregate score of 3–2.

=== Promotion ===
The four best placed teams, which are Botafogo (PB), Juventude, Salgueiro and Tupi, were promoted to the following year's third level.

== Copa do Brasil ==
The 2013 Copa do Brasil started on April 3, 2013, and concluded on November 27, 2013. The Copa do Brasil final was played between Flamengo and Atlético Paranaense.

November 20, 2013

Atlético Paranaense	1–1	Flamengo

Estádio Vila Capanema

November 27, 2013

Flamengo	2–0	Atlético Paranaense

Estádio do Maracanã

Flamengo declared as the cup champions by aggregate score of 3–1.

== State championship champions ==
State	Champion
(Acre (state)) Acre	Plácido de Castro
Alagoas	CRB
Amapá	Santos
(Amazonas (Brazilian state)) Amazonas	Princesa do Solimões
Bahia	Vitória
Ceará	Ceará
(Federal District (Brazil)) Distrito Federal	Brasiliense
Espírito Santo	Desportiva
Goiás	Goiás
Maranhão	Maranhão
Mato Grosso	Cuiabá
Mato Grosso do Sul	CENE
Minas Gerais	Atlético Mineiro
Pará	Paysandu
Paraíba	Botafogo
(Paraná (state)) Paraná	Coritiba
Pernambuco	Santa Cruz
Piauí	Parnahyba
(Rio de Janeiro (state)) Rio de Janeiro	Botafogo
Rio Grande do Norte	Potiguar
Rio Grande do Sul	Internacional
Rondônia	Vilhena
Roraima	Náutico
(Santa Catarina (state)) Santa Catarina	Criciúma
(São Paulo (state)) São Paulo	Corinthians
Sergipe	Sergipe
Tocantins	Interporto

== Youth competition champions ==
Competition	Champion
Campeonato Brasileiro Sub-20	Internacional
Copa do Brasil Sub-17^{(1)}	São Paulo
Copa do Brasil Sub-20	Santos
Copa Nacional do Espírito Santo Sub-17^{(1)}	Fluminense
Copa Rio Sub-17	Fluminense
Copa Santiago de Futebol Juvenil	Internacional
Copa São Paulo de Futebol Júnior	Santos
Copa Sub-17 de Promissão	Audax São Paulo
Taça Belo Horizonte de Juniores	Vasco da Gama
Copa 2 de Julho Sub-17	Brazil U-17

^{(1)} The Copa Nacional do Espírito Santo Sub-17, between 2008 and 2012, was named Copa Brasil Sub-17. The similar named Copa do Brasil Sub-17 is organized by the Brazilian Football Confederation and it was first played in 2013.

== Other competition champions ==
Competition	Champion
Campeonato Paulista do Interior	Ponte Preta
Copa Espírito Santo	Real Noroeste
Copa FGF	Novo Hamburgo
Copa Governador do Mato Grosso	Rondonópolis
Copa do Nordeste	Campinense
Copa Paulista de Futebol	São Bernardo
Copa Rio	Duque de Caxias
Copa Santa Catarina	Joinville

== Brazilian clubs in international competitions ==
Team	2013 Copa Libertadores	2013 Copa Sudamericana	2013 Recopa Sudamericana	2013 Suruga Bank Championship	2013 FIFA Club World Cup
Atlético Mineiro	Champions defeated (Paraguay) Olimpia	N/A	N/A	N/A	Third place defeated (China) Guangzhou Evergrande
Bahia	N/A	Quarterfinals eliminated by (Colombia) Atlético Nacional	N/A	N/A	N/A
Corinthians	Round of 16 eliminated by (Argentina) Boca Juniors	N/A	Champions defeated (Brazil) São Paulo	N/A	N/A
Coritiba	N/A	Quarterfinals eliminated by (Colombia) Itagüí	N/A	N/A	N/A
Criciúma	N/A	Second Stage eliminated by (Brazil) Ponte Preta	N/A	N/A	N/A
Fluminense	Quarterfinals eliminated by (Paraguay) Olimpia	N/A	N/A	N/A	N/A
Grêmio	Round of 16 eliminated by (Colombia) Santa Fe	N/A	N/A	N/A	N/A
Náutico	N/A	Second Stage eliminated by (Brazil) Sport Recife	N/A	N/A	N/A
Palmeiras	Round of 16 eliminated by (Mexico) Tijuana	N/A	N/A	N/A	N/A
Ponte Preta	N/A	Runners-up lost to (Argentina) Lanús	N/A	N/A	N/A
Portuguesa	N/A	Second Stage eliminated by (Brazil) Bahia	N/A	N/A	N/A
São Paulo	Round of 16 eliminated by (Brazil) Atlético Mineiro	Semifinals eliminated by (Brazil) Ponte Preta	Runners-up lost to (Brazil) Corinthians	Runners-up lost to (Japan) Kashima Antlers	N/A
Sport Recife	N/A	Quarterfinals eliminated by (Paraguay) Libertad	N/A	N/A	N/A
Vitória	N/A	Second Stage eliminated by (Brazil) Coritiba	N/A	N/A	N/A

== Brazil national team ==
The following table lists all the games played by the Brazilian national team in official competitions and friendly matches during 2013.

February 6 International friendly	England	2–1	Brazil	London, England
17:30 (UTC–3)	Rooney 26'; Lampard 60'		Fred 48'	Stadium: Wembley Stadium; Attendance: 87,453; Referee: Pedro Proença (Portugal)

March 21 International friendly	Italy	2–2	Brazil	Geneva, Switzerland
16:30 (UTC–3)	De Rossi 54'; Balotelli 57'		Fred 33'; Oscar 42'	Stadium: Stade de Genève; Attendance: 28,000; Referee: Stephan Studer (Switzerland)

March 25 International friendly	Russia	1–1	Brazil	London, England
16:30 (UTC–3)	Fayzulin 73'		Fred 90'	Stadium: Stamford Bridge; Attendance: 35,206; Referee: Howard Webb (England)

April 6 International friendly	Bolivia	0–4	Brazil	Santa Cruz de la Sierra, Bolivia
16:30 (UTC–3)			Damião 4'; Neymar 31', 42'; Leandro 90+2'	Stadium: Estadio Ramón Tahuichi Aguilera; Attendance: 35,000; Referee: Patricio Loustau (Argentina)

April 24 International friendly	Brazil	2–2	Chile	Belo Horizonte, Brazil
22:00 (UTC–3)	Réver 25'; Neymar 55'		González 8'; Vargas 64'	Stadium: Mineirão; Attendance: 53,331; Referee: Carlos Amarilla (Paraguay)

June 2 International friendly	Brazil	2–2	England	Rio de Janeiro, Brazil
16:00 (UTC–3)	Fred 57'; Paulinho 83'		Oxlade-Chamberlain 68'; Rooney 79'	Stadium: Estádio do Maracanã; Attendance: 66,015; Referee: Wilmar Roldán (Colombia)

June 9 International friendly	Brazil	3–0	France	Porto Alegre, Brazil
16:00 (UTC–3)	Oscar 54'; Hernanes 85'; Lucas 90+3' (pen.)			Stadium: Arena do Grêmio; Attendance: 51,919; Referee: Víctor Carrillo (Peru)

June 15 FIFA Confederations Cup; Group Stage	Brazil	3–0	Japan	Brasília, Brazil
16:00 (UTC–3)	Neymar 3'; Paulinho 48'; Jô 90+3'	Report		Stadium: Estádio Nacional de Brasília; Attendance: 67,423; Referee: Pedro Proença (Portugal)

June 19 FIFA Confederations Cup; Group Stage	Brazil	2–0	Mexico	Fortaleza, Brazil
16:00 (UTC–3)	Neymar 9'; Jô 90+3'	Report		Stadium: Castelão; Attendance: 50,791; Referee: Howard Webb (England)

June 22 FIFA Confederations Cup; Group Stage	Italy	2–4	Brazil	Salvador, Brazil
16:00 (UTC–3)	Giaccherini 51'; Chiellini 71'	Report	Dante 45+1'; Neymar 55'; Fred 66', 89'	Stadium: Arena Fonte Nova; Attendance: 48,874; Referee: Ravshan Irmatov (Uzbekistan)

June 26 FIFA Confederations Cup; Semifinals	Brazil	2–1	Uruguay	Belo Horizonte, Brazil
16:00 (UTC–3)	Fred 41'; Paulinho 86'	Report	Cavani 48'	Stadium: Mineirão; Attendance: 57,483; Referee: Enrique Osses (Chile)

June 30 FIFA Confederations Cup; Final	Brazil	3–0	Spain	Rio de Janeiro, Brazil
19:00 (UTC–3)	Fred 2', 47'; Neymar 44'	Report		Stadium: Estádio do Maracanã; Attendance: 73,531; Referee: Björn Kuipers (Netherlands)

August 14 International friendly	Switzerland	1–0	Brazil	Basel, Switzerland
15:45 (UTC–3)	Alves 48' (o.g.)			Stadium: St. Jakob-Park; Attendance: 31,100; Referee: Deniz Aytekin (Germany)

September 7 International friendly	Brazil	6–0	Australia	Brasília, Brazil
16:15 (UTC–3)	Jô 8', 34'; Neymar 36'; Ramires 58'; Pato 73'; Luiz Gustavo 84'			Stadium: Estádio Nacional Mané Garrincha; Attendance: 40,996; Referee: Enrique Cáceres (Paraguay)

September 10 International friendly	Brazil	3–1	Portugal	Foxborough, United States
22:00 (UTC–3)	Thiago Silva 24'; Neymar 34'; Jô 49'		Meireles 18'	Stadium: Gillette Stadium; Attendance: 62,310; Referee: Juan Guzman (United States)

October 12 International friendly	South Korea	0–2	Brazil	Seoul, South Korea
08:00 (UTC–3)			Neymar 44'; Oscar 49'	Stadium: Seoul World Cup Stadium; Attendance: 65,038; Referee: Ravshan Irmatov (Uzbekistan)

October 15 International friendly	Brazil	2–0	Zambia	Beijing, China
08:45 (UTC–3)	Oscar 59'; Dedé 66'			Stadium: National Stadium; Referee: Fan Qi (China)

November 16 International friendly	Brazil	5–0	Honduras	Miami, United States
22:30 (UTC–2)	Bernard 22'; Dante 55'; Maicon 66'; Willian 70'; Hulk 74'			Stadium: Sun Life Stadium; Attendance: 71,124; Referee: Dave Gantar (Canada)

November 19 International friendly	Brazil	2–1	Chile	Toronto, Canada
23:00 (UTC–2)	Hulk 14'; Robinho 79'		Vargas 71'	Stadium: Rogers Centre; Attendance: 53,331; Referee: Silviu Petrescu (Canada)

== Women's football ==
=== National team ===
The following table lists all the games played by the Brazil women's national football team in official competitions and friendly matches during 2013.

==== International friendly ====
March 6, 2013 International friendly	France	2–2	Brazil	Nancy, France
	Eugenie Le Sommer 56'; Gaëtanie Thiney 85'	Report	Giovânia 31', 78'	Stadium: Stade Marcel Picot; Referee: Alexandra Ihringova (England)

March 9, 2013 International friendly	France	1–1	Brazil	Rouen, France
	Louisa Necib 90+1'	Report	Laura Georges 48' (own goal)	Stadium: Stade Robert Diochon; Referee: Simona Ghisletta (Switzerland)

June 19, 2013 International friendly	Sweden	1–1	Brazil	Stockholm, Sweden
	Nilla Fischer 5'	Report	Andressa Alves 30'	Stadium: Söderstadion; Referee: Christina Pedersen (Norway)

November 11, 2013 Friendly	United States	4–1	Brazil	Orlando, United States
15:30 EDT	Leroux 15' 36'; Wambach 17' (pen.); Tymrak 76'; Loyd (yellow card) 79' (yellow-red card) 90+2'	Report	Andréia Rosa (yellow card) 5'; Rosana 25'	Stadium: Florida Citrus Bowl Stadium; Attendance: 20,274; Referee: Margaret Domka (USA)

==== Valais Women's Cup ====
September 22, 2013 Semifinals	Brazil	0–1	New Zealand	Châtel-Saint-Denis, Switzerland
		Report	Amber Hearn 66'	Stadium: Stade du Lussy; Referee: Stéphane Frappart (France)

September 25, 2013 Third place playoff	Brazil	4–0	Mexico	Savièse, Switzerland
	Fabiana Baiana 29'; Debinha 25', 41'; Tamires 80'	Report		Stadium: Stade Saint-Germain; Referee: Esther Staubli (Switzerland)

==== Torneio Internacional de Brasília de Futebol Feminino ====
December 11, 2013 First Stage	Brazil	2–0	Chile	Brasília, Brazil
16:00	Marta 10'; Thaisa 32'	Report		Stadium: Estádio Nacional Mané Garrincha; Attendance: 8,371; Referee: Rodrigo Raposo (Brazil)

December 15, 2013 First Stage	Scotland	1–3	Brazil	Brasília, Brazil
21:50	Lauder 75'	Report	Marta 26'; Debinha 35', 48'	Stadium: Estádio Nacional Mané Garrincha; Attendance: 3,257; Referee: Ademário Neves (Brazil)

December 18, 2013 First Stage	Brazil	0–0	Canada	Brasília, Brazil
21:50		Report		Stadium: Estádio Nacional Mané Garrincha; Attendance: 2,895; Referee: Vanderlei Soares de Macedo (Brazil)

December 22, 2013 Final	Brazil	5–0	Chile	Brasília, Brazil
16:00	Formiga 8'; Marta 41'; Darlene 56'; Cristiane 76'; Debinha 85'	Report		Stadium: Estádio Nacional Mané Garrincha; Referee: Rodrigo Raposo (Brazil)

The Brazil women's national football team competed in the following competitions in 2013:

Competition	Performance
Torneio Internacional de Brasília	Champions
Valais Women's Cup	Third place

== Campeonato Brasileiro de Futebol Feminino ==
The 2013 Campeonato Brasileiro de Futebol Feminino started on September 18, 2013, and concluded on December 7, 2013.

- América-SP
- ASCOOP
- Botafogo-PB
- Caucaia
- Centro Olímpico
- Duque de Caxias
- Foz Cataratas
- Francana
- Iranduba
- Kindermann
- Mixto
- Pinheirense
- Rio Preto
- São Francisco
- São José
- Tiradentes
- Tuna Luso
- Vasco da Gama
- Viana
- Vitória-PE

The Campeonato Brasileiro de Futebol Feminino final was played between Centro Olímpico and São José.

December 4, 2013

São José	2–2	Centro Olímpico

Estádio ADC GM

December 7, 2013

Centro Olímpico	2–1	São José

Baetão

Centro Olímpico declared as the league champions by aggregate score of 4–3.

=== Copa do Brasil de Futebol Feminino ===
The 2013 Copa do Brasil de Futebol Feminino started on February 2, 2013, and concluded on May 4, 2013.

April 27, 2013

Vitória-PE	1–1	São José

Carneirão

May 4, 2013

São José	4–0	Vitória-PE

Estádio Martins Pereira=

São José declared as the cup champions by aggregate score of 5–1.

=== Domestic competition champions ===
Competition	Champion
Campeonato Carioca	Vasco da Gama
Campeonato Paulista	Ferroviária

=== Brazilian clubs in international competitions ===
Team	2013 Copa Libertadores Femenina
Foz Cataratas	Eliminated in the First Stage
São José	Champions defeated (Colombia) Formas Íntimas
