= Feitosa =

Feitosa may refer to:

== People ==
- Antonia Alves ("Jovita") Feitosa (1848-1867), Brazilian female soldier
- Antonio Cleilson da Silva Feitosa (born 1987), Brazilian association football player
- Carlos Eduardo Albano Feitosa (born 1941), Brazilian volleyball player
- Francisco Erandir da Silva Feitosa (born 1982), Brazilian association football player
- Juliette Freire Feitosa (born 1989) Brazilian media personality, lawyer, makeup artist, digital influencer, television presenter, and singer
- Glaube Feitosa (born 1973), Brazilian former kickboxer and kyokushin full contact karate practitioner
- Sidny Feitosa dos Santos (born 1981), Brazilian association football player
- Tarcisio Feitosa da Silva, Brazilian environmental activist

== Places ==
- Feitosa River, a river of Ceará, Brazil
- Feitosa, a neighborhood in Maceió, Brazil
