= 2012 Campeonato Amazonense =

Campeonato Amazonense de Futebol
- Season: 2012
- Champions: Nacional
- Relegated: CDC Manicoré; Operário
- Copa do Brasil: Nacional; Fast Clube
- Série D: Nacional
- Matches: 104
- Goals: 294 (2.83 per match)
- Top goalscorer: Leonardo (Nacional) - 14 goals

The 2012 Campeonato Amazonense de Futebol was the 96th season of the top professional football league in Amazonas, Brazil. The competition began on January 28 and concluded on May 26. Nacional won the championship for the 41st time, while CDC Manicoré and Operário were relegated.

== Format ==
The tournament consists of a double round-robin format, where all twelve teams play each other twice, the competition split in two stages. Each round counts as one stage. The top four teams from each stage advance to the playoffs matches, and the first stage champion will face the second stage champion. If the same team win both stages, it will be considered the champion.

The bottom two teams on overall classification will be relegated.

=== Qualifications ===
The champion qualifies to 2013 Campeonato Brasileiro Série D. The two stage winner qualifies to the 2013 Copa do Brasil.

== Participating teams ==
| Club | Home city | 2011 result |
|---|---|---|
| CDC Manicoré | Manicoré | 1st (2nd division) |
| Fast Clube | Manaus | 3rd |
| Holanda | Rio Preto da Eva | 3rd (2nd division) |
| Iranduba | Iranduba | 2nd (2nd division) |
| Nacional | Manaus | 2nd |
| Operário | Manacapuru | 5th |
| Penarol | Itacoatiara | 1st |
| Princesa do Solimões | Manacapuru | 7th |
| Rio Negro | Manaus | 6th |
| São Raimundo | Manaus | 4th |

== First round - Taça Estado do Amazonas ==
=== Standings ===
| Pos | Team | Pld | W | D | L | GF | GA | GD | Pts | Qualification |
|---|---|---|---|---|---|---|---|---|---|---|
| 1 | Penarol (A) | 9 | 6 | 3 | 0 | 14 | 6 | +8 | 21 | Advances to the Semifinals |
| 2 | Nacional-AM (A) | 9 | 6 | 2 | 1 | 20 | 4 | +16 | 20 | Advances to the Semifinals |
| 3 | Fast Clube (A) | 9 | 6 | 0 | 3 | 20 | 8 | +12 | 18 | Advances to the Semifinals |
| 4 | Princesa do Solimões (A) | 9 | 4 | 2 | 3 | 13 | 9 | +4 | 14 | Advances to the Semifinals |
| 5 | Holanda | 9 | 4 | 0 | 5 | 16 | 14 | +2 | 12 | |
| 6 | CDC Manicoré | 9 | 4 | 0 | 5 | 9 | 15 | −6 | 12 | |
| 7 | São Raimundo-AM | 9 | 3 | 2 | 4 | 11 | 14 | −3 | 11 | |
| 8 | Iranduba | 9 | 3 | 1 | 5 | 10 | 15 | −5 | 10 | |
| 9 | Operário | 9 | 2 | 1 | 6 | 15 | 26 | −11 | 7 | |
| 10 | Rio Negro | 9 | 1 | 1 | 7 | 4 | 21 | −17 | 4 | |

Updated to match(es) played on 8 December 2012. Source:
Rules for classification: 1) points; 2) goal difference; 3) number of goals scored.
(A) Advance to a further round

=== Results ===
| Home \ Away | CDC | FAS | HOL | IRA | NAC | OPE | PEN | PRI | RIO | SRA |
|---|---|---|---|---|---|---|---|---|---|---|
| CDC Manicoré | | | | | | 2–0 | | 0–1 | 1–0 | 2–1 |
| Fast Clube | 1–2 | | | 5–1 | | 6–2 | | 2–0 | | 2–0 |
| Holanda | 4–1 | 0–1 | | | | 4–3 | | | 2–0 | |
| Iranduba | 2–0 | | 0–3 | | | | 1–2 | | | 0–1 |
| Nacional-AM | 4–0 | 1–0 | 2–1 | 1–2 | | | 0–0 | | | 2–0 |
| Operário | | | | 1–3 | 0–2 | | 2–2 | | 3–1 | |
| Penarol | 2–1 | 2–1 | 2–0 | | | | | | 2–0 | 0–0 |
| Princesa do Solimões | | | 2–0 | 0–0 | 1–1 | 4–1 | 1–2 | | | |
| Rio Negro | | 0–2 | | 2–1 | 0–7 | | | 0–2 | | |
| São Raimundo-AM | | | 3–2 | | | 2–3 | | 3–2 | 1–1 | |

Source: RSSSF Brazil
Legend: Blue = home team win; Yellow = draw; Red = away team win.

=== Semifinals ===
==== First leg ====
February 29, 2012
16:30 UTC−03:00

| Princesa do Solimões | 1–1 | Penarol |
|---|---|---|
| Cacau 57' | | Fernando 17' |

Estádio Olímpico Municipal Gilberto Mestrinho, Manacapuru

February 29, 2012
21:00 UTC−03:00

| Fast Clube | 0-0 | Nacional |

Estádio Roberto Simonsen, Manaus

==== Second leg ====
March 3, 2012

| Penarol | 1-1 | Princesa do Solimões |
|---|---|---|
| Isac 58' | | Felipe 75' |
Penalties
| | 3–4 |

Estádio Floro de Mendonça, Itacoatiara, Amazonas

March 3, 2012

| Nacional | 1-0 | Fast Clube |
|---|---|---|
| Cristovão 76' |

Estádio Roberto Simonsen, Manaus

=== Finals ===
==== First leg ====
March 10, 2012
15:00 UTC−03:00

| Princesa do Solimões | 1-2 | Nacional |
|---|---|---|
| Renato 37' | | Garanha 49', 65' |

Estádio Olímpico Municipal Gilberto Mestrinho, Manacapuru

==== Second leg ====
March 17, 2012
15:00 UTC−03:00

| Nacional | 0-1 | Princesa do Solimões |
|---|---|---|
| | | Cacau 43' |
Penalties
| | 5–4 |

Estádio Roberto Simonsen, Manaus

== Second round - Taça Cidade de Manaus ==
=== Standings ===
| Pos | Team | Pld | W | D | L | GF | GA | GD | Pts | Qualification |
|---|---|---|---|---|---|---|---|---|---|---|
| 1 | São Raimundo-AM (A) | 9 | 5 | 2 | 2 | 18 | 9 | +9 | 17 | Advances to the Semifinals |
| 2 | Fast Clube (A) | 9 | 5 | 1 | 3 | 19 | 10 | +9 | 16 | Advances to the Semifinals |
| 3 | Rio Negro (A) | 9 | 5 | 1 | 3 | 17 | 16 | +1 | 16 | Advances to the Semifinals |
| 4 | Iranduba (A) | 9 | 4 | 4 | 1 | 17 | 12 | +5 | 16 | Advances to the Semifinals |
| 5 | Penarol | 9 | 5 | 0 | 4 | 17 | 12 | +5 | 15 | |
| 6 | Holanda | 9 | 4 | 1 | 4 | 12 | 12 | 0 | 13 | |
| 7 | Nacional-AM | 9 | 3 | 2 | 4 | 12 | 12 | 0 | 11 | |
| 8 | Princesa do Solimões | 9 | 3 | 1 | 5 | 12 | 19 | −7 | 10 | |
| 9 | Operário | 9 | 2 | 2 | 5 | 5 | 12 | −7 | 8 | |
| 10 | CDC Manicoré | 9 | 1 | 2 | 6 | 9 | 22 | −13 | 5 | |

Updated to match(es) played on 8 December 2012. Source:
Rules for classification: 1) points; 2) goal difference; 3) number of goals scored.
(A) Advance to a further round

=== Results ===
| Home \ Away | CDC | FAS | HOL | IRA | NAC | OPE | PEN | PRI | RIO | SRA |
|---|---|---|---|---|---|---|---|---|---|---|
| CDC Manicoré | | 0–2 | 2–1 | 3–3 | 1–3 | | 1–2 | | | |
| Fast Clube | | | 2–2 | | 3–0 | | 2–1 | | 4–2 | |
| Holanda | | | | 3–4 | 1–0 | | 0–1 | 1–0 | | 0–1 |
| Iranduba | | 2–0 | | | 2–2 | 0–0 | | 1–2 | 1–1 | 2–1 |
| Nacional-AM | | | | | | 0–1 | | 4–0 | 2–0 | |
| Operário | 1–1 | 1–0 | 0–1 | | | | | | | 1–3 |
| Penarol | | | | 0–2 | 3–0 | 2–0 | | 5–2 | | |
| Princesa do Solimões | 2–0 | 1–4 | | | | 2–0 | | | 2–3 | 1–1 |
| Rio Negro | 2–1 | | 2–3 | | | 3–1 | 3–2 | | | 1–0 |
| São Raimundo-AM | 6–0 | 3–2 | | | 1–1 | | 2–1 | | | |

Source: RSSSF Brazil
Legend: Blue = home team win; Yellow = draw; Red = away team win.

=== Semifinals ===
==== First leg ====
May 2, 2012

| Iranduba | 0-0 | São Raimundo |

April 28, 2012

| Rio Negro | 0-0 | Fast Clube |

==== Second leg ====
May 9, 2012

| São Raimundo | 1-3 | Iranduba |

May 6, 2012

| Fast Clube | 0-0 | Rio Negro |
Penalties
| | 3–1 |

=== Finals ===
==== First leg ====
May 12, 2012

| Iranduba | 0-2 | Fast Clube |

==== Second leg ====
May 16, 2012

| Fast Clube | 2-0 | Iranduba |

== Finals ==
=== First leg ===
May 19, 2012
16:00 UTC−03:00

| Fast Clube | 2-2 | Nacional |
|---|---|---|
| João Gomes; Lacraia | | Leonardo |

Estádio Roberto Simonsen, Manaus
Referee: Wilson Luiz Seneme

=== Second leg ===
May 26, 2012
15:00 UTC−03:00

| Nacional | 2-1 | Fast Clube |
|---|---|---|
| Edvan 35'; Alexandre 46' | | Nando 76' |

Estádio Roberto Simonsen, Manaus
Referee: Leandro Pedro Vuaden

== Overall classification ==
| Pos | Team | Pld | W | D | L | GF | GA | GD | Pts | Qualification or relegation |
|---|---|---|---|---|---|---|---|---|---|---|
| 1 | Nacional-AM (C) | 18 | 9 | 4 | 5 | 32 | 16 | +16 | 31 | Qualified to Copa do Brasil and Brasileiro Série D |
| 2 | Fast Clube | 18 | 11 | 1 | 6 | 39 | 18 | +21 | 34 | Qualified to Copa do Brasil |
| 3 | Penarol | 18 | 11 | 3 | 4 | 31 | 18 | +13 | 36 | |
| 4 | São Raimundo-AM | 18 | 8 | 4 | 6 | 39 | 23 | +16 | 28 | |
| 5 | Iranduba | 18 | 7 | 5 | 6 | 27 | 27 | 0 | 26 | |
| 6 | Holanda | 18 | 8 | 1 | 9 | 28 | 26 | +2 | 25 | |
| 7 | Princesa do Solimões | 18 | 7 | 3 | 8 | 25 | 28 | −3 | 24 | |
| 8 | Rio Negro | 18 | 6 | 2 | 10 | 21 | 37 | −16 | 20 | |
| 9 | CDC Manicoré (R) | 18 | 5 | 2 | 11 | 18 | 37 | −19 | 17 | Relegated to the Second Division |
| 10 | Operário (R) | 18 | 4 | 3 | 11 | 20 | 38 | −18 | 15 | Relegated to the Second Division |

Updated to match(es) played on 8 December 2012. Source: RSSSF Brazil
Rules for classification: 1) points; 2) goal difference; 3) number of goals scored.
(C) Champions; (R) Relegated
