= São Benedito Airport =

Walfrido Salmito de Almeida Airport Aeroporto Walfrido Salmito de Almeida
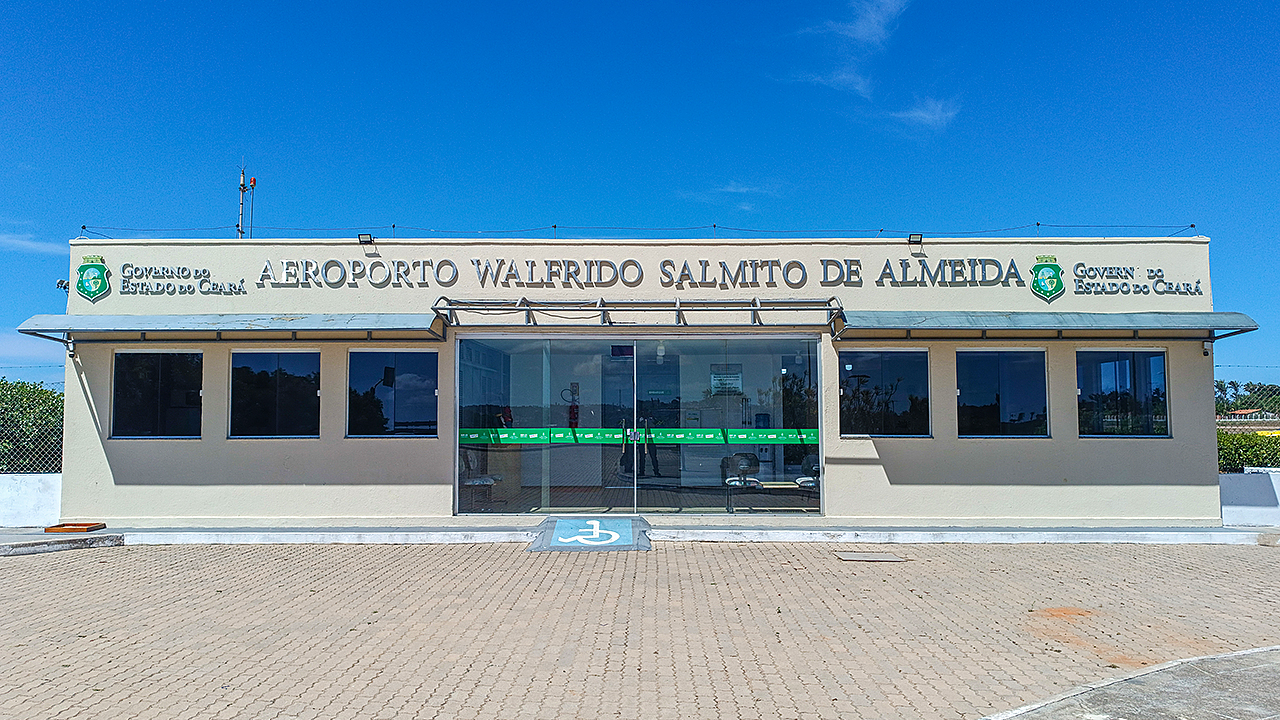
- IATA: JSB; ICAO: SWBE; LID: CE0006

Summary
- Airport type: Public
- Operator: Infraero (2023–2025); Visac Aeroportos (2025-present)
- Serves: São Benedito
- Opened: November 25, 2013
- Time zone: BRT (UTC−03:00)
- Elevation AMSL: 844 m (2,769 ft)
- Coordinates: 04°02′34″S 040°53′38″W
- Website: www4.infraero.gov.br/aeroporto-sao-benedito/

Map
- Location in Brazil

Runways
Direction	Length		Surface
Direction	m	ft	Surface
10/28	1,500	4,921	Asphalt

Statistics (2024)
- Passengers: 1,644
- Aircraft Operations: 781
- Metric tonnes of cargo: 5
- Statistics: Infraero; Sources: Airport Website, ANAC, DECEA

Walfrido Salmito de Almeida Airport (IATA: JSB, ICAO: SWBE), is the airport serving São Benedito, Brazil.

It is managed by contract by Visac Aeroportos.

== History ==
The airport was commissioned on November 25, 2013.

Previously operated by Infraero, on April 22, 2025 the State of Ceará signed a one-year contract of operation with Visac Aeroportos.

== Access ==
The airport is located 3 km (2 mi) from downtown São Benedito.

== See also ==
- List of airports in Brazil
