= Associação Desportiva São Benedito =

Brazilian football club

São Benedito
- Full name: Associação Desportiva São Benedito
- Nicknames: Santo Preto; Azulão da Serra
- Founded: January 20, 2005 (20 years ago)
- Ground: Estádio Tarcísio Araújo, São Benedito, Brazil
Home colors	Away colors

Associação Desportiva São Benedito, usually called São Benedito, is the main football (soccer) club in São Benedito, Ceará, Brazil. It was founded on January 20, 2005.
