= Rick (footballer, born 1987) =

Brazilian footballer

Personal information
- Full name: Ricardo Aparecido Tavares
- Date of birth: April 23, 1987 (age 39)
- Place of birth: São Paulo, Brazil
- Height: 1.73 m (5 ft 8 in)
- Positions: Midfielder; defender

Team information
- Current team: Guarany de Sobral

Youth career
- Palmeiras

Senior career*
| Years | Team | Apps | (Gls) |
| 2006 | Tokyo Verdy | 3 | (0) |
| 2007 | Palmeiras B | | |
| 2007 | Palmeiras | | |
| 2008 | São Bento | | |
| 2009 | Mogi Mirim | | |
| 2010 | Marília | 3 | (0) |
| 2011 | Icasa | | |
| 2011 | Cuiabá | | |
| 2011 | Itapirense | | |
| 2012 | Marília | | |
| 2012– | Guarany de Sobral | | |
- * Club domestic league appearances and goals as of June 8, 2011

Ricardo Aparecido Tavares (born 23 April 1987 in São Manuel, São Paulo), commonly known as Rick, is a Brazilian football player at the position of midfielder. He currently plays for Guarany Sporting Club.

== Career ==
He spent youth career at Palmeiras and played for Japanese club Tokyo Verdy at the age of 19. After finishing his contract with Verdy, he returned to Palmeiras but never played as a starting player.

== Club statistics ==
| Club performance | | | League | | Cup | | Total | |
| Season | Club | League | Apps | Goals | Apps | Goals | Apps | Goals |
| Japan | | | League | | Emperor's Cup | | Total | |
|---|---|---|---|---|---|---|---|---|
| 2006 | Tokyo Verdy | J2 League | 3 | 0 | 0 | 0 | 3 | 0 |
| Country | Japan | | 3 | 0 | 0 | 0 | 3 | 0 |
| Total | | | 3 | 0 | 0 | 0 | 3 | 0 |
