= 2013 Campeonato Goiano =

Campeonato Goiano de Futebol
- Season: 2013
- Champions: Goiás
- Relegated: Rio Verde; Itumbiara
- Copa do Brasil: Goiás; Atlético Goianiense; Goianésia
- Série D: Goianésia; Aparecidense
- Matches played: 96
- Goals scored: 273 (2.84 per match)
- Top goalscorer: Ricardo Jesus (Atlético Goianiense) - 12 goals

The 2013 Campeonato Goiano de Futebol was the 70th season of Goiás' top professional football league. The competition began on January 20 and ended on May 19. Goiás were the champion by the 24th time. Rio Verde and Itumbiara were relegated.

== Format ==
The tournament consists of a double round-robin format, in which all ten teams play each other twice. The four better-placed teams will face themselves in playoffs matches. The bottom two teams on overall classification will be relegated.

The top 3 will qualify for the 2014 Copa do Brasil. The two best teams that aren't on Campeonato Brasileiro Série A, Série B or Série C qualify to the Série D.

== Participating teams ==
Club	Home city	2012 result
Anápolis	Anápolis	1st (2nd division)
Aparecidense	Aparecida de Goiânia	6th
Atlético Goianiense	Goiânia	2nd
CRAC	Catalão	3rd
Goianésia	Goianésia	8th
Goiás	Goiânia	1st
Grêmio Anápolis	Anápolis	2nd (2nd division)
Itumbiara	Itumbiara	5th
Rio Verde	Rio Verde	7th
Vila Nova	Goiânia	4th

== First stage ==
Pos	Team	Pld	W	D	L	GF	GA	GD	Pts	Qualification or relegation
1	Goiás (A)	16	11	4	1	41	10	+31	37	Advances to the Semifinals
2	Atlético Goianiense (A)	18	9	6	3	33	18	+15	33	Advances to the Semifinals
3	Goianésia (A)	18	9	4	5	26	20	+6	31	Advances to the Semifinals
4	Aparecidense (A)	18	7	5	6	28	23	+5	26	Advances to the Semifinals
5	Grêmio Anápolis	18	7	3	8	20	23	−3	24	
6	Vila Nova	18	6	2	10	27	34	−7	20	
7	CRAC	18	6	2	10	17	28	−11	20	
8	Anápolis	18	4	7	7	28	35	−7	19	
9	Rio Verde (R)	18	4	7	7	20	31	−11	19	Relegated
10	Itumbiara (R)	18	3	4	11	15	33	−18	13	Relegated

(A) Advance to a further round; (R) Relegated

=== Results ===
Home \ Away	ANA	APA	ACG	CRAC	GNE	GOI	GAN	ITU	RVE	VIL
Anápolis		0–1	2–3	1–1	2–2	0–4	3–1	3–2	3–2	1–2
Aparecidense	2–1		0–3	3–1	3–2	1–2	2–1	2–0	1–1	5–0
Atlético Goianiense	0–3	4–0		3–0	2–1	1–7	3–3	13–0	4–1	4–1
CRAC	2–2	2–1	2–1		0–2	1–2	1–0	0–1	2–1	3–2
Goianésia	3–0	2–1	3–1	2–0		1–5	1–0	1–2	0–4	3–2
Goiás	3–0	1–6	2–2	2–0	4–1		1–4	2–0	7–0	3–3
Grêmio Anápolis	1–1	3–2	1–1	1–0	2–1	1–3		2–0	2–1	2–0
Itumbiara	2–2	2–3	0–2	1–2	0–1	1–1	1–0		1–7	2–5
Rio Verde	2–2	1–1	1–1	1–0	1–2	1–0	1–1	3–0		2–1
Vila Nova	2–2	2–2	0–1	2–0	2–0	0–2	1–2	2–0	3–0	

Legend: Blue = home team win; Yellow = draw; Red = away team win.

== Final stage ==
Semifinals
1	Goiás	1	4	5
4	Aparecidense	2	1	3
2	Atlético Goianiense	3	3	6
3	Goianésia	0	0	0

Finals
1	Goiás	0	2	2
2	Atlético Goianiense	0	2	2
