= Simão (footballer, born 1984) =

Brazilian footballer

Personal information
- Full name: Simão Rodrigues dos Santos
- Date of birth: July 5, 1984 (age 42)
- Place of birth: Rio de Janeiro, Brazil
- Height: 1.74 m (5 ft 9 in)
- Position: Attacking midfielder

Team information
- Current team: Guarany de Sobral

Youth career
- 2001–2002: Guarani

Senior career*
| Years | Team | Apps | (Gls) |
| 2003–2004 | Guarani | 64 | (2) |
| 2005–2009 | Atlético-PR | 1 | (0) |
| 2005 | → Brasiliense (loan) | 6 | (0) |
| 2006 | → Portuguesa-SP (loan) | | |
| 2007–2008 | → Fortaleza (loan) | | |
| 2009 | → ABC (loan) | | |
| 2009 | Portuguesa-SP | 9 | (0) |
| 2010 | Ituano | | |
| 2010 | América-MG | | |
| 2011 | Linense | | |
| 2011 | Paulínia FC | | |
| 2012 | Anapolina | | |
| 2012– | Guarany de Sobral | | |
- * Club domestic league appearances and goals

Simão Rodrigues dos Santos (born July 5, 1984, in Rio de Janeiro), or simply Simão, is a Brazilian footballer who plays as an attacking midfielder for Guarany de Sobral.
