= Renato Santiago =

Brazilian footballer

Councillor of São José dos Campos
- Incumbent
- Assumed office 1 January 2021
- Constituency: At-large

Personal details
- Born: 19 June 1977 (age 49) Juiz de Fora, Brazil
- Party: UNIÃO (2024–present)
- Other political affiliations: PSDB (2020–24)
- Spouse: Patricia Santiago
- Children: Raí; Raphaela
- Education: Federal University of Juiz de Fora
- Profession: Footballer, professor, politician
Association football career
- Full name: Renato Camargo Santiago
- Date of birth: 19 June 1977 (age 49)
- Place of birth: Juiz de Fora, Brazil
- Height: 1.83 m (6 ft 0 in)
- Position: Forward
Youth career
- 1994–1997: Fluminense
Senior career*
Years	Team	Apps	(Gls)
2000	Tupi		(6)
2001	Sobradinho		(10)
2001	América Mineiro	0	(0)
2002	São José-SP	16	(10)
2002	Marília	4	(2)
2003	Figueirense		
2004	Juventude	7	(0)
2004	ES Tunis		
2005	Taubaté	11	(8)
2005	Atlético Sorocaba	1	(0)
2006	Taubaté	17	(10)
2006	Remo	21	(4)
2007	Tupi		
2007	Tupynambás	11	(12)
2008	Caldense		
2008–2009	São José-SP	20	(10)
2009	Americana	6	(0)
2010	São José-SP	17	(7)
2011	Campinense	10	(6)
2011–2012	São José-SP	14	(3)
2012–2013	Joseense	34	(15)
- * Club domestic league appearances and goals

Renato Camargo Santiago (born 19 June 1977) is a Brazilian politician, professor and retired footballer who played as a forward. He is a current councillor of São José dos Campos, aside from a youth coordinator of São José-SP.

== Career ==
Born in Juiz de Fora, Minas Gerais, Santiago played for Fluminense as a youth before returning to his hometown in 1997 to study Physical Education in the Federal University of Juiz de Fora. He began his career with Tupi in 2000, before impressing with Sobradinho in the 2001 Campeonato Brasiliense.

Santiago was signed by Série A side América Mineiro for the remainder of the 2001 season, and first joined São José-SP in 2002. He later played for Marília, Figueirense and Juventude before moving abroad to join Espérance Sportive de Tunis in 2004.

Back to Brazil in 2005, Santiago was a top scorer for Taubaté in two consecutive seasons and played in the 2006 Série B for Remo. In the following years, he notably played for clubs in his native state and São José, where he soon became a fan favourite.

In 2012, Santiago moved to neighbouring Joseense, where he also acted as a fotball manager while playing. He left his managerial role in July 2013, and agreed to return to São José also to work as a fotball manager in October.

In September 2014, after nearly a year away from a playing role, Santiago announced his retirement.

== Post-playing career ==
After retiring, Santiago became a teacher in São José dos Campos, and was elected councillor of the city in 2020. In the end of 2023, he returned to São José EC as a youth coordinator.
