= Ademilson (footballer, born 1974) =

Brazilian footballer

Personal information
- Full name: Ademilson Correa
- Date of birth: 9 October 1974 (age 52)
- Place of birth: Itaguaí, Brazil
- Height: 1.72 m (5 ft 8 in)
- Position: Forward

Youth career
- –1994: Ypiranga-RS

Senior career*
Years	Team	Apps	(Gls)
1994–1996	Ypiranga-RS		
1997	Rio Branco-ES		
1998	Comercial-SP		
2000	Rio Branco-ES		
2001	Alegrense		
2001	Desportiva		
2002	Alegrense		
2002	Botafogo		
2003	Fluminense	28	(6)
2003	Irapuato		
2004	Lobos de Tlaxcala		
2005	Lokeren		
2005	Paysandu		
2006	Cianorte		
2006	Marília		
2007–2010	Tupi		
2010	Ipatinga		
2010–2011	Uberlândia		
2011–2015	Tupi		
2016–2018	Tupynambás		
2018	Athletic-MG		
2019	Tupi		
2019–2020	Tupynambás		
- * Club domestic league appearances and goals

Ademilson Correa (born 9 October 1974), simply known as Ademilson, is a Brazilian former professional footballer who played as a forward.

== Career ==
Ademilson played for several clubs in Brazil, notably Botafogo and Fluminense, as well as teams in Mexico and Lokeren from Belgium.

He is considered the greatest idol of Tupi of Juiz de Fora, where he was part of the campaigns of both promotions to Series D, in 2011 with the title, and in 2013. Also in 2013 Campeonato Brasileiro Série D, in the Aparcidense vs. Tupi match, has a goal was denied by the Goiás club's masseur who invaded the field and took the ball away before crossing the goal line.

Ademilson ended his career at the age of 44, defending Tupynambás from Juiz de Fora.

== Honours ==
Alegrense

- Campeonato Capixaba: 2001, 2002

Tupi

- Campeonato Brasileiro Série D: 2011
- Taça Minas Gerais: 2009

Tupynambás

- Campeonato Mineiro Segunda Divisão: 2016

Individual

- 2013 Campeonato Brasileiro Série D top scorer: 12 goals
