= Washington Olivera =

Uruguayan footballer and coach (born 1954)

Personal information
- Full name: Enrique Washington Olivera Castro
- Date of birth: June 25, 1954 (age 72)
- Place of birth: Montevideo, Uruguay
- Position: Forward

Youth career
- Montevideo Wanderers

Senior career*
Years	Team	Apps	(Gls)
1975–1978	Montevideo Wanderers		
1979	Peñarol		
1980	O'Higgins		
1980–1981	Tampa Bay Rowdies	28	(4)
1980–1982	Tampa Bay Rowdies (indoor)	15	(12)
1981–1983	Cobreloa		
1983	Nacional		
1984–1985	Progreso		
1985	Provincial Osorno		
1986–1987	Racing Club		
1987–1990	Toluca		
1990–1991	Luis Ángel Firpo		

International career
1976	Uruguay U23	5	(3)
1976–1979	Uruguay	10	(1)

Managerial career
- 2002: Provincial Osorno
- Cobreloa (youth)
- 2006: Cobreloa B
- * Club domestic league appearances and goals

Enrique Washington Olivera Castro (born June 25, 1954, in Montevideo, Uruguay), known as Washington Olivera, is a coach and former footballer who played for clubs in Uruguay, Argentina, Chile, the United States and El Salvador, as well as the Uruguay national football team. He played as a forward.

== Teams ==
- Montevideo Wanderers 1975–1978
- Peñarol 1979
- O'Higgins 1980
- Tampa Bay Rowdies 1980–1981
- Cobreloa 1981–1983
- Nacional 1983
- Progreso 1984–1985
- Provincial Osorno 1985
- Racing Club 1986–1987
- Toluca 1987–1990
- Luis Ángel Firpo 1990–1991

== Coaching career ==
Olivera worked as coach for the Cobreloa youth system and led the B-team at the 2006 Tercera División. He trained players such as Eduardo Vargas and Junior Fernandes.

== Personal life ==
He is the father of professional footballer Bryan Olivera and the uncle of Mario Larramendi.

He is well known by his nickname, Trapo (Rag).

He made his home in Osorno, Chile.

His nephew, Enzo Olivera, is a sports journalist who wrote the biographical book El Trapo, la verdad de Washington Olivera (The Rag, the truth about Washington Olivera).

== Honours ==
Cobreloa

- Chilean Primera División: 1982

Individual

- Chilean Primera División Top Goalscorer: 1983
