= Mario Larramendi =

Uruguayan footballer (born 1984)

Personal information
- Full name: Mario Esteban Larramendi Olivera
- Date of birth: 6 June 1984 (age 42)
- Place of birth: Montevideo, Uruguay
- Height: 1.90 m (6 ft 3 in)
- Position: Defender

Youth career
- Rentistas
- Cerrito

Senior career*
Years	Team	Apps	(Gls)
2000–2002	Deportivo Arauco	–	(–)
2002–2006	Provincial Osorno		
2006–2009	Cerrito	56	(3)
2010	14 de Julho		
2011–2013	Passo Fundo		
2013–2015	Novo Hamburgo		
2013	→ Botafogo-PB (loan)	7	(3)
2015	→ Marau (loan)	4	(0)
2015	Cerrito	10	(1)
2016	Treze	4	(1)
2017	Miramar Misiones	8	(0)
2017	Rentistas	11	(1)
2019	Passo Fundo	7	(1)
2019	IA Potencia	4	(0)
2020	La Luz	12	(1)
- * Club domestic league appearances and goals

Mario Esteban Larramendi Olivera (born June 6, 1984) is a Uruguayan former footballer who played as a defender. He played in Chile, in Uruguay for Cerrito (twice) and in Brazil for 14 de Julho, Passo Fundo and Novo Hamburgo from Rio Grande do Sul state, and Botafogo-PB from Paraíba state, among others.

== Career ==
Larremendi's early career was spent in Chile with Deportivo Arauco and Provincial Osorno, before joining Cerrito, who at the time played in the Uruguayan Primera División. After the club suffered relegation, he moved to Brazil, signing first for 14 de Julho in 2009 and then Passo Fundo in 2011. In 2012, he helped Passo Fundo win promotion from the second level of the Rio Grande do Sul state league to the top level.

On 29 April 2013, after the conclusion of the state league, he signed for Novo Hamburgo. However, before playing a competitive game, on 3 June 2013 he moved to Botafogo-PB. There he was a member of the team which won Série D, scoring the first goal in the second leg of the final.

After leaving Botafogo at the end of the 2013 season, he signed again for Novo Hamburgo, but was soon diagnosed with a serious injury which ruled him out for the first half of the season. In May 2015, he was loaned to second division club Esporte Clube Marau for 25 days. At the end of this spell he announced he was retiring from football and returning to Uruguay.

In September 2015 he signed again for Cerrito, who were now playing in the Uruguayan Segunda División Amateur (third tier) in Uruguay. He captained the side to the title.

On 14 December 2015, it was announced that Larramendi had signed for Treze for the 2016 Campeonato Paraibano. On 19 March 2016, Treze announced that the player had left the club, after an inappropriate post on social media.

Larramendi ended his career in his homeland with IA Potencia in 2019 and La Luz in 2020.

== Personal life ==
Larramendi is the nephew of the former Uruguay international footballer Washington Olivera.

Larramendi rose to some notoriety in the Brazilian press when, in December 2013, shortly after signing for Novo Hamburgo after leaving Botafogo-PB, he was diagnosed with a tumour in his left femur. Unable to afford the treatment, he advertised for sale on social media the Série D winners medal he had received only a couple of months previous. Within 24 hours, the chairman of Novo Hamburgo announced that tests would be funded by his contracted club. The state government of Paraíba also promised to pay for the operation.

== Achievements ==
- Champion, 2013 Campeonato Brasileiro Série D (with Botafogo-PB)
- Champion, 2015 Uruguayan Segunda División Amateur (with Cerrito)
