= 2013 Campeonato Mato-Grossense =

Brazilian state football league season

Campeonato Mato-Grossense de Futebol
- Season: 2013
- Champions: Cuiabá
- Relegated: Vila Aurora
- Copa do Brasil: Cuiabá
- Série D: Mixto
- Matches played: 76
- Goals scored: 175 (2.3 per match)

The 2013 Campeonato Mato-Grossense de Futebol was the 71st edition of the Mato Grosso's top professional football league. The competition began on January 20, and ended on May 5. Cuiabá Esporte Clube won the championship by the 4th time, while Vila Aurora was relegated. Atlético Campoverdense withdrawn their spot on the championship, so the championship had only one relegation spot and nine teams.

== Format ==
On the first stage, all teams play against each other in a double round-robin. The worst team is relegated, and the top four teams qualify to the playoffs. The playoffs are two-leg matches.

=== Qualifications ===
The champion qualifies to the 2014 Copa do Brasil. The best team who isn't on Campeonato Brasileiro Série A, Série B or Série C qualifies to the Campeonato Brasileiro Série D.

== Participating teams ==
Club	Home city	2012 result
Cacerense	Cáceres, Mato Grosso	2nd (2nd division)
Cuiabá	Cuiabá	2nd
Luverdense	Lucas do Rio Verde	1st
Mato Grosso	Cuiabá	7th
Mixto	Cuiabá	3rd
Rondonópolis	Rondonópolis	8th
Sinop	Sinop	1st (2nd division)
União	Rondonópolis	5th
Vila Aurora	Rondonópolis	4th

== First round ==
=== Standings ===
Pos	Team	Pld	W	D	L	GF	GA	GD	Pts	Qualification or relegation
1	Luverdense	16	10	5	1	29	11	+18	35	Advanced to the Final_stage
2	Mato Grosso	16	9	4	3	24	13	+11	31	Advanced to the Final_stage
3	Cuiabá	16	8	5	3	26	16	+10	29	Advanced to the Final_stage
4	Mixto	16	6	8	2	15	9	+6	26	Advanced to the Final_stage
5	União-MT	16	6	5	5	20	17	+3	23	
6	Rondonópolis	16	4	7	5	22	20	+2	19	
7	Cacerense	16	5	3	8	13	23	−10	18	
8	Sinop	16	2	1	13	6	27	−21	7	
9	Vila Aurora (R)	16	0	6	10	10	29	−19	6	Relegated

(R) Relegated

=== Results ===
Home \ Away	CAC	CUI	LUV	MAT	MIX	RON	SIN	UEC	VLA
Cacerense		1–2	0–3	0–1	0–2	2–1	1–0	1–1	0–0
Cuiabá	4–1		0–0	0–2	0–0	2–0	2–0	2–0	2–2
Luverdense	2–1	2–2		3–0	1–1	2–1	0–1	3–2	3–1
Mato Grosso	2–0	3–0	1–1		1–1	1–0	1–0	0–1	4–2
Mixto	4–0	2–1	0–0	0–0		1–2	1–0	0–0	1–0
Rondonópolis	1–1	2–2	0–1	2–2	1–1		4–0	1–1	2–2
Sinop	0–1	0–2	1–3	1–3	0–1	1–2		0–1	1–0
União-MT	0–2	1–2	0–2	2–1	3–0	1–1	4–0		2–1
Vila Aurora	0–2	0–3	0–3	0–2	0–0	0–2	1–1	1–1	

Legend: Blue = home team win; Yellow = draw; Red = away team win.

== Final stage ==
Semifinals
1	Luverdense	1	0	1
4	Mixto	2	1	3
2	Mato Grosso	0	1	1
3	Cuiabá	2	3	5

Finals
4	Mixto	1	1	2 (2)
3	Cuiabá	0	2	2 (3)

=== Semifinals ===
==== First leg ====
April 13, 2013
18:00 UTC−03:00

Mixto	2–1	Luverdense

Dutrinha, Cuiabá

April 14, 2013
15:00 UTC−03:00

Cuiabá	2–0	Mato Grosso

Dutrinha, Cuiabá

==== Second leg ====
April 21, 2013
15:00 UTC−03:00

Luverdense	0–1	Mixto

Passo das Emas Stadium, Lucas do Rio Verde

April 21, 2013
18:00 UTC−03:00

Mato Grosso	1–3	Cuiabá

Dutrinha, Cuiabá

=== Finals ===
April 28, 2013
15:00 UTC−03:00

Mixto	1–0	Cuiabá
Paulo Henrique 77'

Dutrinha, Cuiabá

May 05, 2013
15:00 UTC−03:00

Cuiabá	2–1	Mixto
Marcão; Fernando		Felipe Adão
Penalties
	3-2

Dutrinha, Cuiabá

Cuiabá won the 2013 Campeonato Mato-Grossense.
