= 2013 Campeonato Roraimense =

Campeonato Roraimense de Futebol
- Season: 2013
- Champions: Náutico
- Copa do Brasil: Náutico
- Série D: Náutico
- Matches played: 21
- Goals scored: 60 (2.86 per match)

The 2013 Campeonato Roraimense de Futebol was the 54th edition of the Roraima's top professional football league. The competition began on April 6, and ended on May 29. Náutico won the championship by the 2nd time.

== Format ==
On the first stage, all teams play against each other in a double round-robin. The best team in each round advance to the finals. The finals are played in two-legged ties.

The first round is named Taça Boa Vista and the second round is named Taça Roraima.

=== Qualifications ===
The champion qualify to the 2013 Campeonato Brasileiro Série D and the 2014 Copa do Brasil.

== Participating teams ==
Club	Home city	2012 result
Atlético Roraima	Boa Vista	3rd
Baré	Boa Vista	Did not play
GAS	Boa Vista	6th
Náutico	Caracaraí	2nd
São Raimundo-RR	Boa Vista	1st

== First round (Taça Boa Vista) ==
=== Standings ===
Pos	Team	Pld	W	D	L	GF	GA	GD	Pts	Qualification
1	Náutico-RR	4	2	2	0	7	5	+2	8	Champion of the round
2	São Raimundo-RR	4	2	1	1	5	2	+3	7	
3	Baré	4	1	2	1	6	6	0	5	
4	Atlético Roraima	4	0	3	1	6	7	−1	3	
5	GAS	4	0	2	2	3	7	−4	2	

Rules for classification: 1) points; 2) goal difference; 3) number of goals scored.

=== Results ===
Home \ Away	ATR	BAR	GAS	NAR	RAI
Atlético Roraima		1–1		2–2	
Baré			1–1		
GAS					1–0
Náutico-RR		4–3	1–0		
São Raimundo-RR	2–1			0–0	

Legend: Blue = home team win; Yellow = draw; Red = away team win.

== Second round (Taça Roraima) ==
=== Standings ===
Pos	Team	Pld	W	D	L	GF	GA	GD	Pts	Qualification
1	São Raimundo-RR	4	3	0	1	12	2	+10	9	Champion of the round
2	Baré	4	2	1	1	6	4	+2	7	
3	GAS	4	2	0	2	7	9	−2	6	
4	Náutico-RR	4	1	1	2	4	10	−6	4	
5	Atlético Roraima	4	1	0	3	4	8	−4	3	

Rules for classification: 1) points; 2) goal difference; 3) number of goals scored.

=== Results ===
Home \ Away	ATR	BAR	GAS	NAR	RAI
Atlético Roraima			2–3		0–3
Baré	0–1			2–2	
GAS		1–3		2–0	
Náutico-RR	2–1				0–5
São Raimundo-RR		0–1	4–1		

Legend: Blue = home team win; Yellow = draw; Red = away team win.

== Final stage ==
June 1, 2013
18:00 UTC−03:00

São Raimundo-RR	0–0	Náutico
Penalties
	4-5

Estádio Raimundo Ribeiro de Souza, Boa Vista
Attendance: 439
Referee: Zacarias Santiago

Náutico Futebol Clube is the champion of the 2013 Campeonato Roraimense.
