= Erandir =

Brazilian footballer (born 1982)

Personal information
- Full name: Francisco Erandir da Silva Feitosa
- Date of birth: August 5, 1982 (age 44)
- Place of birth: Fortaleza, Brazil
- Height: 1.82 m (6 ft 0 in)
- Position: Defensive midfielder

Youth career
- 1999–2000: Fortaleza

Senior career*
| Years | Team | Apps | (Gls) |
| 2001 | Fortaleza | 13 | (1) |
| 2001 | Atlético Paranaense | 5 | (0) |
| 2002–2005 | Fortaleza | 125 | (2) |
| 2006–2008 | Atlético Paranaense | 44 | (2) |
| 2008 | → Fortaleza (Loan) | | |
| 2009–2010 | Atlético Goianiense | 13 | (0) |
| 2011 | São Caetano | 12 | (0) |
| 2012 | Guarany de Sobral | 6 | (0) |
| 2013 | Boa Esporte | 1 | (0) |
| 2013–2014 | Horizonte | 18 | (1) |
| 2015 | Sousa | 2 | (0) |
| 2015–2019 | Ferroviário | 37 | (0) |
| 2019–2020 | Caucaia | 11 | (0) |
- * Club domestic league appearances and goals

Francisco Erandir da Silva Feitosa (born August 5, 1982), or simply Erandir, is a Brazilian professional footballer who plays as a defensive midfielder.
