= Operário Esporte Clube =

Operário
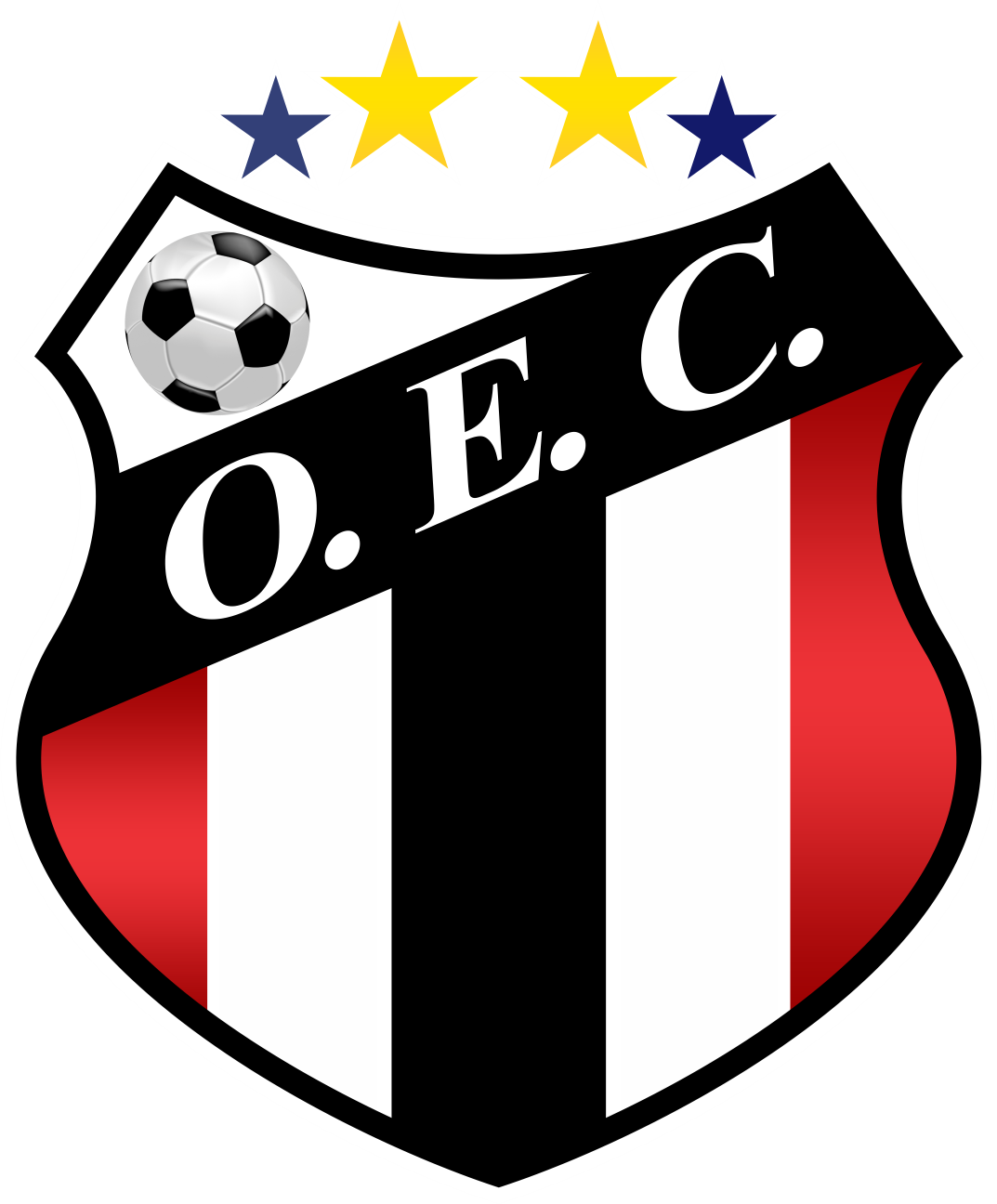
- Full name: Operário Esporte Clube
- Nickname(s): Sapão da Terra Preta; Sapão
- Founded: June 10, 1982
- Ground: Gilbertão, Manacapuru, Amazonas state, Brazil
- Capacity: 15,000
Home colours	Away colours

Operário Esporte Clube, commonly known as Operário, is a Brazilian football club based in Manacapuru, Amazonas state.

== History ==
The club was founded on June 10, 1982. Operário won the Campeonato Amazonense Second Level in 2010.

== Achievements ==
- Campeonato Amazonense Second Level:
  - Winners (2): 2010, 2014

== Stadium ==
Operário Esporte Clube play their home games at Estádio Olímpico Municipal Gilberto Mestrinho, nicknamed Gilbertão. The stadium has a maximum capacity of 15,000 people.
