= 2013 Campeonato Acreano =

Campeonato Acreano
- Season: 2013
- Champions: Plácido de Castro (1st title)
- Relegated: Independência (withdrawn); Nauás
- Copa do Brasil: Plácido de Castro; Rio Branco
- Série D: Plácido de Castro
- Matches played: 62
- Goals scored: 216 (3.48 per match)
- Top goalscorer: Juliano César (Rio Branco) (26 goals)
- Biggest home win: Galvez 10–0 Nauás

The 2013 Campeonato Acreano was the 67th season of the Campeonato Acreano, the top professional football league of the state of Acre. Plácido de Castro were champions for the 1st time. The championship started 17 February 2013, and ended on 26 May.

== Format ==
The first stage is in double round-robin. The best four teams qualify to Final Stage.

The champion and the runner-up qualify to the 2014 Copa do Brasil. The champion also qualifies to the 2013 Campeonato Brasileiro Série D

As Independência withdrawn its participation, they were replaced by Alto Acre Futebol Club.

== Teams ==
Club	Home city	2012 result
Alto Acre	Epitaciolândia	8th
Andirá	Rio Branco	6th
Atlético	Rio Branco	2nd
Galvez	Rio Branco	1st (2nd division)
Juventus	Rio Branco	5th
Náuas	Cruzeiro do Sul	7th
Plácido de Castro	Plácido de Castro	4th
Rio Branco	Rio Branco	1st (Champions)

== First stage ==
Pos	Team	Pld	W	D	L	GF	GA	GD	Pts	Qualification or relegation
1	Rio Branco-AC	14	11	1	2	44	8	+36	34	Advanced to the Final Stage
2	Atlético Acreano	14	9	3	2	24	13	+11	30	Advanced to the Final Stage
3	Plácido de Castro	14	9	1	4	24	14	+10	28	Advanced to the Final Stage
4	Galvez	14	6	4	4	29	15	+14	22	Advanced to the Final Stage
5	Juventus-AC	14	6	2	6	33	27	+6	20	
6	Alto Acre	14	3	2	9	18	31	−13	11	
7	Andirá	14	2	3	9	14	39	−25	9	
8	Náuas	14	1	2	11	14	53	−39	5	Relegated to the 2013 Second Division of Campeonao Acreano

== Final stage ==
Semifinals
1	Rio Branco	1	1	2
4	Galvez	1	10	11
3	Plácido de Castro	1	0	1
2	Atlético	0	0	0

Finals
1	Rio Branco	2	0 (2)	2
3	Plácido de Castro	0	3 (4)	3

Rio Branco and Plácido de Castro qualified for 2013 Copa do Brasil
