= São Benedito =

Municipality in Ceará, Brazil

Coordinates: 4°02′56″S 40°51′54″W

- Municipality
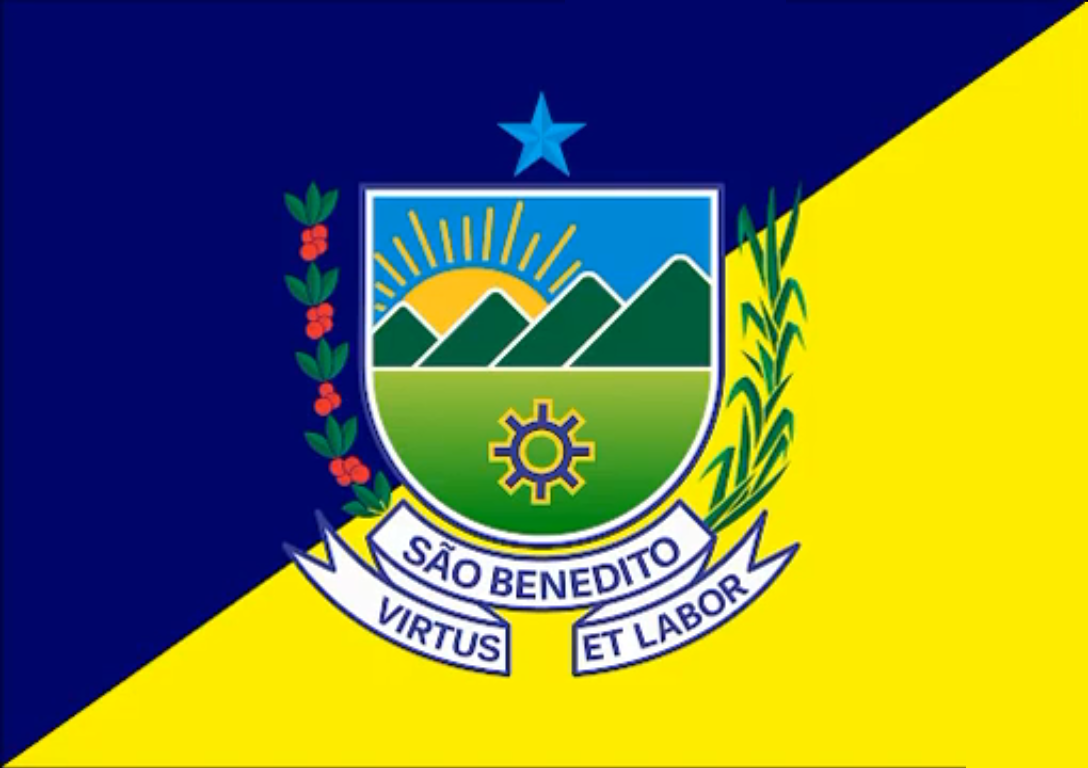
- Flag Coat of arms
- Interactive map of São Benedito
- Country: Brazil
- Region: Northeast
- State: Ceará
- Founded: 25 November 1873

Government
  - Mayor: Saul Lima Maciel (PDT)

Area
  - Total: 350.847 km^{2} (135.463 sq mi)
- Elevation: 902 m (2,959 ft)

Population (2022)
  - Total: 47.640
  - Density: 0.13579/km^{2} (0.35168/sq mi)
- Demonym: beneditense
- Time zone: UTC−3 (BRT)
- CEP: 62370-000
- Area code: 88
- HDI (2010): 0.611 – medium
- Website: saobenedito.ce.gov.br

São Benedito is a municipality in the state of Ceará in the Northeast region of Brazil.

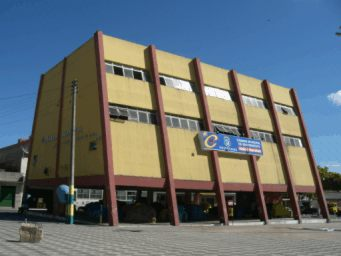
Câmara Municipal (the legislature) of São Benedito

== Transportation ==
The city is served by Walfrido Salmito de Almeida Airport.

== See also ==
- List of municipalities in Ceará
