= Lima (footballer, born 1982) =

Brazilian footballer

Personal information
- Full name: João Maria Lima do Nascimento
- Date of birth: September 4, 1982 (age 44)
- Place of birth: Rio de Janeiro, Brazil
- Height: 1.82 m (6 ft 0 in)
- Position: Forward

Team information
- Current team: Ceará

Senior career*
Years	Team	Apps	(Gls)
1999–2001	Alecrim		
2002	Caxias		
2005	Veranópilis		
2006–2007	Brasil de Farroupilha		
2008	Goiás	3	(0)
2008–2009	Joinville		
2009	Bahia	10	(2)
2009–2013	Joinville	127	(68)
2010	→ FC Seoul (Loan)	0	(0)
2014	Paysandu		
2014–	Ceará		
- * Club domestic league appearances and goals

João Maria Lima do Nascimento, also known as Lima (born September 4, 1982 in Brazil) is a Brazilian footballer who plays as a forward for Ceará.
