= Tupynambás Futebol Clube =

Tupynambás
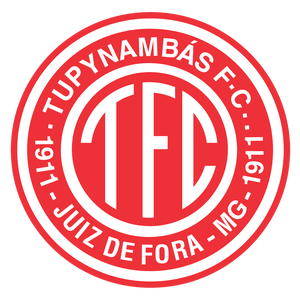
- Full name: Tupynambás Futebol Clube
- Nicknames: Baeta; Leão do Poço Rico
- Founded: August 15, 1911 (114 years ago)
- Ground: Estádio Mário Helênio
- Capacity: 31,863
- 2024: Mineiro Segunda Divisão, 4th of 17
| Home colors | Away colors | colors |

Tupynambás Futebol Clube, commonly known as Tupynambás, is a Brazilian professional association football club based in Juiz de Fora, Minas Gerais. The team plays in the Campeonato Mineiro Segunda Divisão, the third tier of football in Minas Gerais.

== History ==
The club was founded on August 15, 1911, being named after the Tupinambás, a native Brazilian nation. The club won the Campeonato Citadino de Juiz de Fora in 1919, 1920, 1924, 1925, 1928, 1931, 1932, 1934, 1946, 1961, and 1966. They competed in the Campeonato Mineiro in 1969, but closed their football department soon after that due to financial problems. Tupynambás competed in the Campeonato Mineiro Second Level in 1983, but after a bad performance, the team, commanded by head coach Augusto Clemente, again closed its football department. The club reopened its football department in 2007 when they reached the Second Stage of the Campeonato Mineiro Third Level. Tupynambás' Renato Santiago was the competition's top goal scorer, with 12 goals, but once again ceased football operations.

In 2016, Tupynambás returned to professional football after receiving a percentage fee from Danilo's sale to Real Madrid.

== Current squad ==
Note: Flags indicate national team as defined under FIFA eligibility rules; some limited exceptions apply. Players may hold more than one non-FIFA nationality.

| No. / Pos. / Nation / Player; — / GK / BRA / Glaysson | No. / Pos. / Nation / Player |

== Honours ==
=== State ===
- Campeonato Mineiro
  - Runners-up (1): 1934
- Campeonato Mineiro Segunda Divisão
  - Winners (1): 2016

=== City ===
- Campeonato Citadino de Juiz de Fora
  - Winners (11): 1919, 1920, 1924, 1925, 1928, 1931, 1932, 1934, 1946, 1961, 1966
- Torneio Início da Liga de Juiz de Fora
  - Winners (17): 1919, 1920, 1925, 1929, 1930, 1931 1932, 1935, 1938 1940, 1945, 1949, 1050, 1051, 1956, 1962, 1965
- Troféu Mário Helênio de Lery Santos
  - Winners (1): 2019
- Torneio Municipal
  - Winners (2): 1951, 1952
- Copa Juiz de Fora
  - Winners (2): 1961, 1964

== Stadium ==
Tupynambás Futebol Clube play their home games at Estádio Mário Helênio. The stadium has a maximum capacity of 31,863 people.

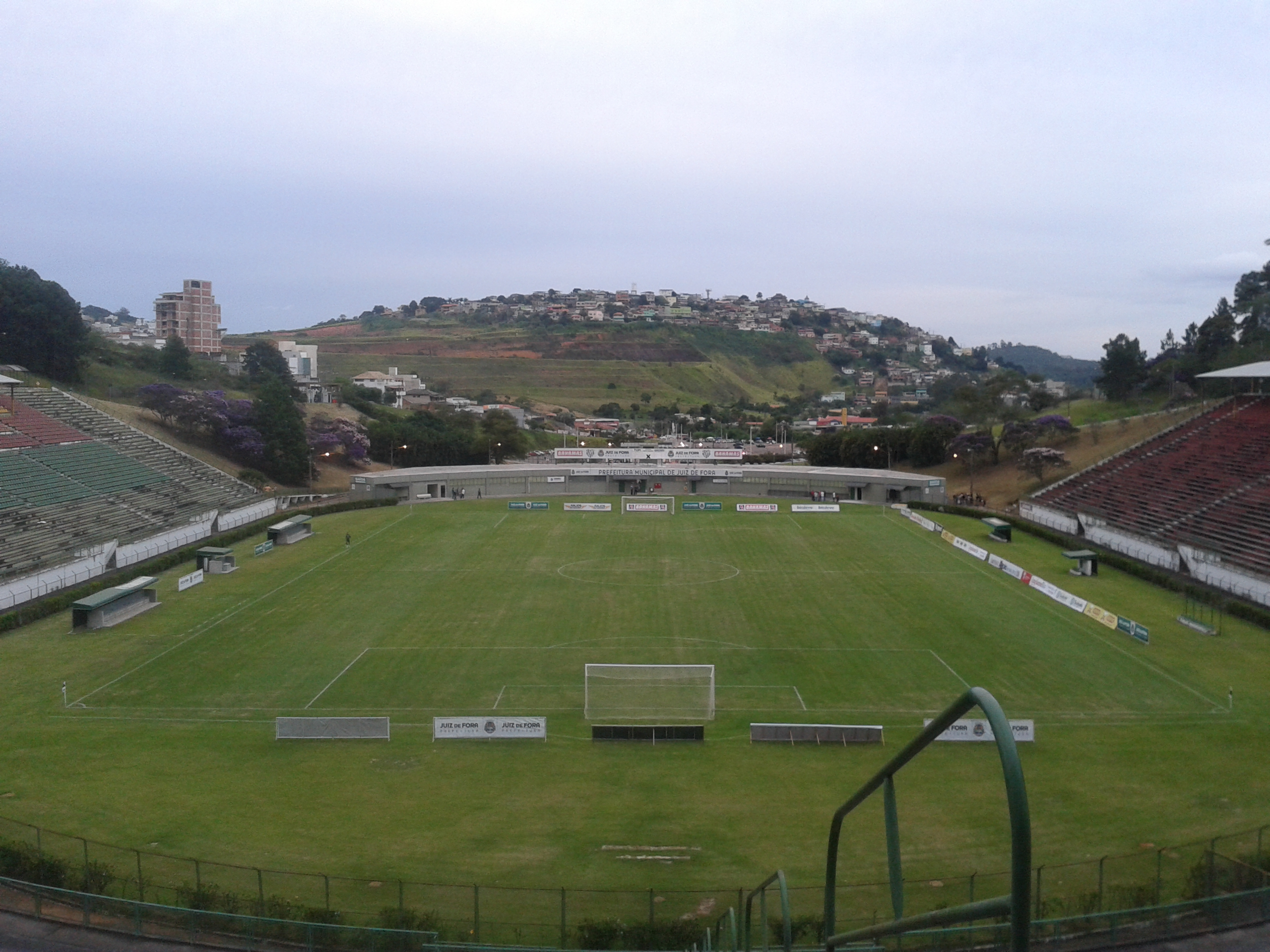
Estádio Mário Helênio
