= Leandro Carvalho (footballer, born 1995) =

Brazilian footballer

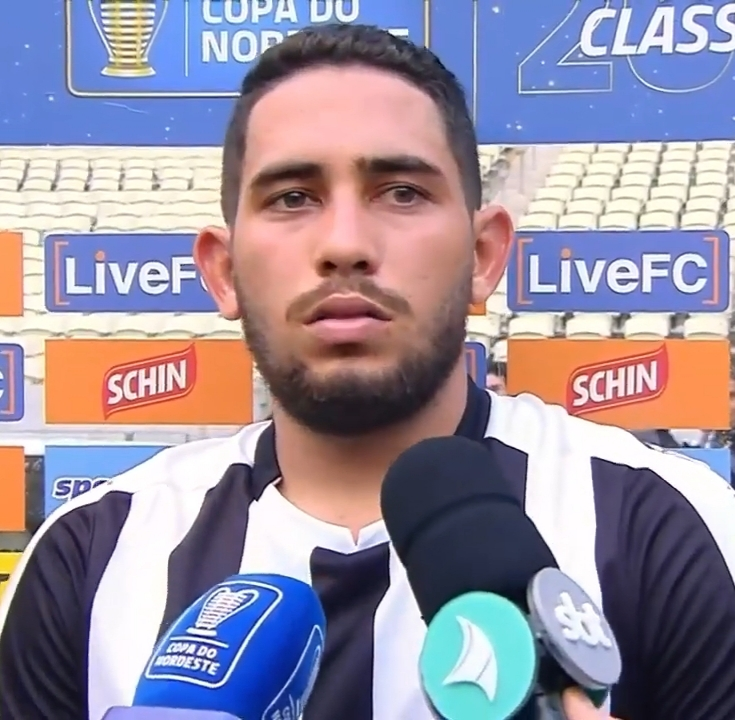

Personal information
- Full name: Leandro Carvalho da Silva
- Date of birth: 10 May 1995 (age 31)
- Place of birth: Belém, Brazil
- Height: 1.72 m (5 ft 7 1/2 in)
- Position: Forward

Team information
- Current team: Águia de Marabá

Senior career*
Years	Team	Apps	(Gls)
2014–2017	Paysandu	12	(1)
2016	→ Penapolense (loan)	11	(1)
2016	→ Linense (loan)	0	(0)
2016	→ Carajás (loan)	0	(0)
2017	→ Ceará (loan)	17	(3)
2018–2019	Botafogo	10	(0)
2018	→ Ceará (loan)	20	(5)
2019–2023	Ceará	78	(8)
2021	→ América Mineiro (loan)	11	(0)
2021	→ Al-Qadsiah (loan)	5	(0)
2022	→ Náutico (loan)	13	(1)
2022	→ Remo (loan)	7	(1)
2023	Avaí	2	(0)
2024–	Águia de Marabá	0	(0)
- * Club domestic league appearances and goals as of 23:14, 25 October 2021 (UTC)

Leandro Carvalho da Silva (born 10 May 1995), known as Leandro Carvalho, is a Brazilian footballer who plays as forward for Águia de Marabá.

== Club career ==
Born in Belém, Leandro Carvalho represented Paysandu as youth. Promoted to the first team ahead of the 2014 season, he made his senior debut on 19 January of that year by coming on as a second-half substitute in a 2–2 Campeonato Paraense away draw against Paragominas.

Leandro Carvalho scored his first goal as a senior on 2 February 2014, netting the fifth in a 6–0 home routing of São Francisco-PA. He featured regularly during the year, but appeared rarely in the following campaign due to an indiscipline problem.

On 8 January 2016, Leandro Carvalho was loaned to Penapolense until the end of the year's Campeonato Paulista Série A2. After featuring regularly, he served subsequent loans at Linense and Carajás before returning to Papão in November 2016 due to another indiscipline problem.

On 1 August 2017, Leandro Carvalho moved to fellow second division side Ceará, on loan until the end of the season. The following 1 January, after achieving promotion to Série A, he signed a three-year deal with Botafogo also in the main category.

On 6 July 2018, after being rarely used, Leandro Carvalho returned to Ceará on loan until December. The following 28 February, he signed a permanent three-year contract with the latter club.

On 12 February 2021, Leandro Carvalho moved to fellow top tier side América-MG, on a loan deal until December 2021. On 26 July, after several indiscipline problems, his loan was cut short and he joined Al-Qadsiah also in a temporary deal.

== Career statistics ==
As of 25 October 2021

Club	Season	League			State League		Cup		Continental		Other		Total	
Club	Season	Division	Apps	Goals	Apps	Goals	Apps	Goals	Apps	Goals	Apps	Goals	Apps	Goals
Paysandu	2014	Série C	5	0	11	2	2	1	—		6 (Note: All appearance(s) in Copa Verde)	1	24	4
Paysandu	2015	Série B	1	0	4	0	0	0	—		1	0	6	0
Paysandu	2016	Série B	2	0	0	0	0	0	—		—		2	0
Paysandu	2017	Série B	4	1	11	1	2	0	—		6	1	23	3
Paysandu	Total		12	1	26	3	4	1	—		13	2	53	7
Penapolense (loan)	2016	Paulista A2	—		11	1	—		—		—		11	1
Linense (loan)	2016	Série D	0	0	—		—		—		—		0	0
Carajás (loan)	2016	Paraense 2ª Divisão	—		0	0	—		—		—		0	0
Ceará (loan)	2017	Série B	16	2	—		—		—		—		16	2
Botafogo	2018	Série A	1	0	2	0	0	0	1 (Note: Appearance(s) in Copa Sudamericana)	0	—		4	0
Botafogo	2019	Série A	0	0	4	0	1	0	1	0	—		6	0
Botafogo	Total		1	0	6	0	1	0	2	0	—		10	0
Ceará (loan)	2018	Série A	20	5	—		—		—		—		20	5
Ceará	2019	Série A	26	3	6	2	—		—		3 (Note: All appearance(s) in Copa do Nordeste)	0	35	5
Ceará	2020	Série A	19	1	6	0	9	2	—		9	0	43	3
Ceará	Total		45	4	12	2	9	2	—		9	0	78	8
América Mineiro (loan)	2021	Série A	0	0	9	0	2	0	—		—		11	0
Career total			94	12	64	6	16	3	2	0	25	2	199	23

== Honours ==
Paysandu

- Campeonato Paraense: 2016, 2017
- Copa Verde: 2016

Botafogo

- Campeonato Carioca: 2018

Ceará

- Copa do Nordeste: 2020, 2023

Náutico

- Campeonato Pernambucano: 2022
