= João Paulo (footballer, born November 1984) =

Brazilian footballer

Personal information
- Full name: João Paulo Pereira Mendes Bersch
- Date of birth: November 17, 1984 (age 41)
- Place of birth: Curitiba, Brazil
- Height: 1.84 m (6 ft 0 in)
- Position: Central defender

Team information
- Current team: Paysandu

Youth career
- 2001–2002: Atlético-PR

Senior career*
| Years | Team | Apps | (Gls) |
| 2003 | Atlético-PR | | |
| 2004–2009 | Paraná | 35 | (0) |
| 2008 | → Goiás (loan) | 9 | (0) |
| 2009–2010 | Goiás | 14 | (1) |
| 2010 | → Figueirense (loan) | 4 | (0) |
| 2011–2012 | Figueirense | 74 | (7) |
| 2013 | Joinville | 0 | (0) |
| 2014– | Paysandu | | |
- * Club domestic league appearances and goals

João Paulo Pereira Mendes Bersch or simply João Paulo (born November 17, 1984, in Curitiba), is a Brazilian central defender who currently plays for Paysandu Sport Club.

== Contract ==
- Paraná: 1 February 2007 to 31 January 2010
- Figueirense: 6 May 2011 to 31 December 2012
