= Guarany Sporting Club =

Guarany de Sobral
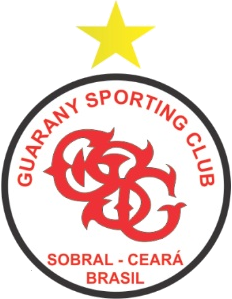
- Full name: Guarany Sporting Club
- Nicknames: Bugre Sobralense; Cacique do Vale; Guarasol
- Founded: July 3, 1938
- Ground: Estádio do Junco
- Capacity: 10,000
- Presidente: José Cláudio
- League: Campeonato Cearense Série B
- 2025: Cearense Série C, 2nd of 4 (promoted)
Home colours	Away colours

Guarany Sporting Club, commonly known as Guarany de Sobral or just as Guarany, is a Brazilian football club from Sobral, Ceará state. They competed once in the Série B and in the Série C, and won the Série D once.

== History ==
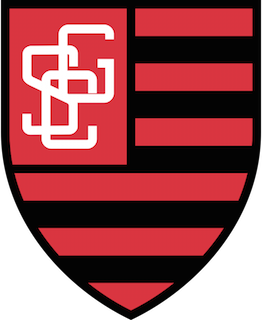
Old crest

Guarany Sporting Club was founded on July 2, 1938, at Luiz Nogueira Adeodato's home, located in Sobral, Ceará state. The first members of the club's board of directors were Father José Aloísio Pinto and Luiz Nogueira Adeodato. Guarany won their first title, which was the Campeonato Cearense Second Level, in 1966, winning the competition again in the following year and in 1999. They competed in the Série C in 2001, finishing in the third place, and then being promoted to the Série B in 2002, replacing Malutrom in the competition. The club competed in the Série D in 2010, winning the competition after beating América-AM in the final.

== Stadium ==
Guarany de Sobral play their home games at Estádio Plácido Aderaldo Castelo, commonly known as Estádio do Junco. The stadium is located in Sobral, Ceará, and has a maximum capacity of 15,000 people.

== Honours ==
=== Official tournaments ===
National
Competitions	Titles	Seasons
Campeonato Brasileiro Série D	1	2010
State
Competitions	Titles	Seasons
Copa Fares Lopes	1	2015
Campeonato Cearense Série B	4	1967, 1999, 2005, 2008

- record

=== Others tournaments ===
==== State ====
- Taça Padre Cícero (3): 2013, 2019, 2020

==== City ====
- Campeonato Sobralense (27): 1940, 1941, 1942, 1943, 1944, 1945, 1947, 1948, 1950, 1951, 1952, 1953, 1955, 1957, 1960, 1964, 1965, 1966, 1973, 1974, 1975, 1976, 1977, 1979, 1980, 1981, 1982
- Torneio da Reinauguração do Estádio do Junco (1): 1999

=== Runners-up ===
- Campeonato Cearense (1): 2013
- Copa Fares Lopes (2): 2013, 2022
- Campeonato Cearense Série B (1): 2018
- Campeonato Cearense Série C (1): 2025

== Current squad ==
Note: Flags indicate national team as defined under FIFA eligibility rules; some limited exceptions apply. Players may hold more than one non-FIFA nationality.

No.	Pos.	Nation	Player
—	GK	BRA	Eliardo
—	GK	BRA	Marcelo Silva
—	DF	BRA	Ari
—	DF	BRA	Joécio
—	DF	BRA	Zadda
—	DF	BRA	Simão
—	DF	BRA	Rick
—	MF	BRA	Erandir
—	MF	BRA	Cacau
—	MF	BRA	Ramon
—	MF	BRA	Jordy
—	MF	BRA	Rafael Rodrigues

No.	Pos.	Nation	Player
—	MF	BRA	Jorginho
—	MF	BRA	Marcos Cacau
—	MF	BRA	Rodrigo Santos
—	MF	BRA	Leandro Mendes
—	MF	BRA	Kate (on loan from Ceará)
—	FW	BRA	Danilo Pitbull
—	FW	BRA	Rinaldo
—	FW	BRA	Marco Túlio
—	FW	BRA	Oliveira
—	FW	BRA	Rafael
—	FW	BRA	Alemão
—	FW	BRA	Alckmin (on loan from Ceará)
