= 2023 Campeonato Catarinense =

Campeonato Catarinense
- Season: 2023
- Dates: 14 January - 8 April
- Champions: Criciúma (11th title)
- Relegated: Atlético Catarinense; Camboriú
- Copa do Brasil: Brusque; Criciúma
- Série D: Barra; Concórdia; Hercílio Luz
- Matches played: 80
- Goals scored: 145 (1.81 per match)
- Top goalscorer: Adilson Bahia; Fabinho; Waguininho (5 goals each)

The 2023 Campeonato Catarinense (officially the Catarinense Fort Atacadista 2023 for sponsorship reasons) is the 98th season of Santa Catarina's top-flight football league organized by FCF. The season began on 14 January and ended on 8 April 2023.

The finals were played between Criciúma and the defending champions Brusque. Criciúma won 2–0 on aggregate and clinched their 11th title.

== Format ==
The tournament was contested between 12 teams, who first played in a single round-robin tournament. In the first stage, the bottom two teams were relegated to the 2024 Série B. The final stage was played on a home-and-away two-legged basis. Champions and runners-up qualified for the 2024 Copa do Brasil, while three teams qualified for the 2024 Campeonato Brasileiro Série D.

== Participating teams ==
Club	Home city	Manager	2022 result	Titles (last)
Atlético Catarinense	São José	Carlos Pereira (caretaker)	2nd (Série B)	0
Avaí	Florianópolis	Alex	8th	18 (2021)
Barra	Balneário Camboriú	Rafael Piccinin	10th	0
Brusque	Brusque	Luizinho Lopes	1st	2 (2022)
Camboriú	Camboriú	Júnior Lopes	2nd	0
Chapecoense	Chapecó	Argel Fuchs	6th	7 (2020)
Concórdia	Concórdia	Itamar Schülle	3rd	0
Criciúma	Criciúma	Cláudio Tencati	1st (Série B)	10 (2013)
Figueirense	Florianópolis	Douglas Bazolli	4th	18 (2018)
Hercílio Luz	Tubarão	Raul Cabral	5th	2 (1958)
Joinville	Joinville	Marcelo Martelotte	9th	12 (2001)
Marcílio Dias	Itajaí	Rogélio (caretaker)	7th	1 (1963)

== First stage ==
=== Table and Results ===
Pos	Team	Pld	W	D	L	GF	GA	GD	Pts	Qualification or relegation	HER	CHA	BRU	CRI	AVA	CON	BAR	FIG	JEC	MCD	CAM	ATL
1	Hercílio Luz	11	6	4	1	9	3	+6	22	Advance to Final stage		1–0		0–0	1–0		1–0		1–0		0–0	
2	Chapecoense	11	5	5	1	16	7	+9	20	Advance to Final stage			0–0	1–1	2–0					3–0	3–1	3–1
3	Brusque	11	4	7	0	11	6	+5	19	Advance to Final stage	2–1			1–1		0–0	2–0	3–2			1–1	
4	Criciúma	11	4	6	1	12	6	+6	18	Advance to Final stage						0–0		1–0	1–1	0–1		2–0
5	Avaí	11	5	2	4	18	14	+4	17	Advance to Final stage			1–1	2–2		1–0		4–0			3–0	
6	Concórdia	11	3	7	1	9	5	+4	16	Advance to Final stage	0–0	2–2					0–0	0–0	1–0			3–0
7	Barra	11	3	4	4	10	14	−4	13	Advance to Final stage		0–0		0–1	4–3					3–1		1–0
8	Figueirense	11	3	3	5	11	13	−2	12	Advance to Final stage	1–1	0–1					4–0		1–1	2–1		1–0
9	Joinville	11	2	6	3	10	6	+4	12			1–1	0–1		3–0		0–0			0–0		
10	Marcílio Dias	11	3	2	6	8	15	−7	11		0–2		0–0		1–2	1–2					1–0	
11	Camboriú (R)	11	2	5	4	7	14	−7	11	Relegation to Série B				0–3		1–1	2–2	1–0	0–0			1–0
12	Atlético Catarinense (R)	11	0	1	10	2	20	−18	1	Relegation to Série B	0–1		0–0		0–2				0–4	1–2		

Source: FCF
Rules for classification: 1) Points; 2) Wins; 3) Goal difference; 4) Goals scored; 5) Head-to-head result (only in a two-way tie); 6) Fewest red cards; 7) Fewest yellow cards; 8) Draw.
(R) Relegated

== Final stage ==
Starting from the quarter-finals, the teams played a single-elimination tournament. The matches were played on a home-and-away two-legged basis, with the higher-seeded team hosting the second leg. If tied on aggregate, the penalty shoot-out would be used to determine the winners.

=== Bracket ===
Quarter-finals
5	Avaí	0	0	0 (13)
4	Criciúma (p)	0	0	0 (14)
8	Figueirense	0	0	0
1	Hercílio Luz	1	0	1
7	Barra	2	2	4
2	Chapecoense	0	1	1
6	Concórdia	0	0	0
3	Brusque	0	2	2

Semi-finals
4	Criciúma	2	1	3
1	Hercílio Luz	0	2	2
7	Barra	1	1	2
3	Brusque	2	3	5

Finals
4	Criciúma	1	1	2
3	Brusque	0	0	0

=== Quarter-finals ===
Team 1	Agg.	Team 2	1st leg	2nd leg
Figueirense	0–1	Hercílio Luz	0–1	0–0
Barra	4–1	Chapecoense	2–0	2–1
Concórdia	0–2	Brusque	0–0	0–2
Avaí	0–0 (13–14 p)	Criciúma	0–0	0–0

==== Group A ====
19 March 2023
17:00

Figueirense	0–1	Hercílio Luz
	Report	André Henrique 3'

Estádio Orlando Scarpelli, Florianópolis
Attendance: 8,331
Referee: Gustavo Ervino Bauermann

22 March 2023
20:00

Hercílio Luz	0–0	Figueirense
	Report

Estádio Aníbal Torres Costa, Tubarão
Attendance: 3,885
Referee: Héber Lopes

Hercílio Luz qualified for the semi-finals.

==== Group B ====
18 March 2023
19:00

Barra	2–0	Chapecoense
Adilson Bahia 31' (pen.); Marcelinho 90+1'	Report

Estádio Hercílio Luz, Itajaí
Attendance: 1,033
Referee: William Machado Steffen

23 March 2023
21:00

Chapecoense	1–2	Barra
Ribamar 20'	Report	Natan Costa 56'; Marcelinho 85'

Arena Condá, Chapecó
Attendance: 7,181
Referee: Rodrigo D'Alonso Ferreira

Barra qualified for the semi-finals.

==== Group C ====
19 March 2023
16:00

Concórdia	0–0	Brusque
	Report

Estádio Domingos Machado de Lima, Concórdia
Attendance: 982
Referee: Héber Lopes

23 March 2023
19:00

Brusque	2–0	Concórdia
Guilherme Queiróz 31'; Everton Bala 82'	Report

Estádio Augusto Bauer, Brusque
Attendance: 2,112
Referee: Luiz Augusto Silveira Tisne

Brusque qualified for the semi-finals.

==== Group D ====
18 March 2023
16:30

Avaí	0–0	Criciúma
	Report

Estádio da Ressacada, Florianópolis
Attendance: 7,284
Referee: Ramon Abatti Abel

21 March 2023
21:00

Criciúma	0–0	Avaí
	Report
Penalties
Fellipe Mateus (penalty scored); Marcinho (penalty scored); Lohan (penalty scored); Marcelo Hermes (penalty scored); Éder (penalty scored); Ítalo (penalty scored); Claudinho (penalty scored); Léo Costa (penalty scored); Rayan (penalty scored); Rodrigo (penalty scored); Gustavo (penalty missed); Fellipe Mateus (penalty scored); Marcinho (penalty scored); Lohan (penalty scored); Marcelo Hermes (penalty scored)	14–13	(penalty scored) Waguininho; (penalty scored) Dentinho; (penalty scored) Andrey; (penalty scored) Natanael; (penalty scored) Ricardo Bueno; (penalty scored) Giva; (penalty scored) Raniele; (penalty scored) Thales Oleques; (penalty scored) Eduardo; (penalty scored) Vitão; (penalty missed) Alexander; (penalty scored) Waguininho; (penalty scored) Dentinho; (penalty scored) Andrey; (penalty missed) Natanael

Estádio Heriberto Hülse, Criciúma
Attendance: 14,440
Referee: Bráulio da Silva Machado

Criciúma qualified for the semi-finals.

=== Semi-finals ===
Team 1	Agg.	Team 2	1st leg	2nd leg
Criciúma	3–2	Hercílio Luz	2–0	1–2
Barra	2–5	Brusque	1–2	1–3

==== Group E ====
25 March 2023
16:30

Criciúma	2–0	Hercílio Luz
Éder 11'; Fellipe Mateus 15'	Report

Estádio Heriberto Hülse, Criciúma
Attendance: 14,723
Referee: Rafael Traci

29 March 2023
21:00

Hercílio Luz	2–1	Criciúma
André Henrique 5'; Anderson Ligeiro 58' (pen.)	Report	Fabinho 73'

Estádio Aníbal Torres Costa, Tubarão
Attendance: 4,680
Referee: William Machado Steffen

Criciúma qualified for the finals.

==== Group F ====
26 March 2023
17:00

Barra	1–2	Brusque
Roldan 29'	Report	Alex Ruan 50'; Everton Bala 53'

Estádio Hercílio Luz, Itajaí
Attendance: 2,150
Referee: Bráulio da Silva Machado

29 March 2023
19:00

Brusque	3–1	Barra
Alex Ruan 4'; Guilherme Queiróz 37'; Cléo Silva 62'	Report	Adilson Bahia 48'

Estádio Augusto Bauer, Brusque
Attendance: 2,855
Referee: Héber Lopes

Brusque qualified for the finals.

=== Finals ===
Team 1	Agg.	Team 2	1st leg	2nd leg
Criciúma	2–0	Brusque	1–0	1–0

==== Group G ====
1 April 2023
16:30

Criciúma	1–0	Brusque
Lohan 90'	Report

Estádio Heriberto Hülse, Criciúma
Attendance: 16,796
Referee: Bráulio da Silva Machado

Criciúma	Brusque

GK	1	(Brazil) Gustavo
DF	2	(Brazil) Claudinho		(substituted off) 87'
DF	3	(Brazil) Rodrigo (c)
DF	4	(Brazil) Walisson Maia
DF	6	(Brazil) Marcelo Hermes		(substituted off) 87'
MF	8	(Brazil) Arilson
MF	17	(Brazil) Rômulo		(substituted off) 57'
MF	7	(Brazil) Fellipe Mateus
MF	10	(Brazil) Marcinho	(yellow card) 13'	(substituted off) 76'
FW	11	(Brazil) Fabinho
FW	23	(Italy) Éder		(substituted off) 76'
Substitutes:
GK	12	(Brazil) Alisson
DF	13	(Brazil) Thiago Mina
DF	16	(Brazil) Hélder Santos		(substituted in) 87'
MF	5	(Brazil) Crystopher		(substituted in) 57'
MF	9	(Brazil) Alexandre Tam
MF	14	(Brazil) Léo Gonçalves
MF	15	(Brazil) Léo Costa
MF	20	(Brazil) Ítalo		(substituted in) 76'
MF	21	(Brazil) Thiaguinho
MF	22	(Brazil) Rodrigo Souza
FW	18	(Brazil) João Carlos		(substituted in) 87'
FW	19	(Brazil) Lohan	(yellow card) 90+9'	(substituted in) 76'
Coach:
(Brazil) Cláudio Tencati

GK	1	(Brazil) Matheus Nogueira
DF	20	(Brazil) Toty		(substituted off) 84'
DF	3	(Brazil) Éverton Alemão
DF	4	(Brazil) Wallace (c)
DF	66	(Brazil) Alex Ruan	(yellow card) 52'
MF	5	(Brazil) Rodolfo Potiguar
MF	33	(Brazil) João Pedro	(yellow card) 84'	(substituted off) 84'
MF	8	(Brazil) Jhemerson		(substituted off) 77'
FW	99	(Brazil) Everton Bala
FW	17	(Brazil) Guilherme Queiróz		(substituted off) 65'
FW	7	(Brazil) Cléo Silva		(substituted off) 65'
Substitutes:
GK	47	(Brazil) Ruan Carneiro
DF	14	(Brazil) Dionatan
DF	21	(Brazil) Danilo Belão		(substituted in) 84'
DF	22	(Brazil) Iran
MF	10	(Brazil) Thiago Alagoano		(substituted in) 77'
MF	88	(Brazil) Rodrigo		(substituted in) 84'
MF	97	(Brazil) Neto
FW	9	(Brazil) Olávio		(substituted in) 65'
FW	11	(Brazil) Lucas Poletto
FW	18	(Brazil) Pedoca
FW	27	(Brazil) Diego Mathias		(substituted in) 65'
Coach:
(Brazil) Luizinho Lopes

Assistant referees:
Henrique Neu Ribeiro
Thiaggo Americano Labes
Fourth official:
Fernando Henrique de Medeiros Miranda
Fifth official:
Hector Andrew Lisbôa Jacques
Video assistant referee:
Rafael Traci
Assistant video assistant referees:
Éder Alexandre

8 April 2023
16:30

Brusque	0–1	Criciúma
	Report	Hélder Santos 77'

Estádio Augusto Bauer, Brusque
Attendance: 4,978
Referee: Ramon Abatti Abel

Brusque	Criciúma

GK	1	(Brazil) Matheus Nogueira
DF	20	(Brazil) Toty		(substituted off) 57'
DF	2	(Brazil) Éverton Alemão
DF	4	(Brazil) Wallace (c)	(yellow card) 59'
DF	66	(Brazil) Alex Ruan
MF	5	(Brazil) Rodolfo Potiguar	(yellow card) 60'
MF	88	(Brazil) Rodrigo	(yellow card) 23'	(substituted off) 66'
MF	8	(Brazil) Jhemerson
FW	99	(Brazil) Everton Bala		(substituted off) 80'
FW	17	(Brazil) Guilherme Queiróz		(substituted off) 80'
FW	7	(Brazil) Cléo Silva
Substitutes:
GK	47	(Brazil) Ruan Carneiro
DF	3	(Brazil) Ianson
DF	6	(Brazil) Airton
DF	21	(Brazil) Danilo Belão
DF	22	(Brazil) Iran
MF	10	(Brazil) Thiago Alagoano		(substituted in) 66'
MF	30	(Brazil) Luiz Henrique
FW	9	(Brazil) Olávio		(substituted in) 57'
FW	11	(Brazil) Lucas Poletto		(substituted in) 80'
FW	18	(Brazil) Pedoca	(yellow card) 45+6'
FW	19	(Brazil) Luizinho
FW	27	(Brazil) Diego Mathias		(substituted in) 80'
Coach:
(Brazil) Luizinho Lopes

GK	1	(Brazil) Gustavo	(yellow card) 87'
DF	2	(Brazil) Claudinho		(substituted off) 73'
DF	3	(Brazil) Rodrigo (c)
DF	4	(Brazil) Walisson Maia
DF	6	(Brazil) Marcelo Hermes
MF	8	(Brazil) Arilson	(yellow card) 56'
MF	17	(Brazil) Rômulo	(yellow card) 77'	(substituted off) 73'
MF	7	(Brazil) Fellipe Mateus
MF	10	(Brazil) Marcinho		(substituted off) 66'
FW	11	(Brazil) Fabinho		(substituted off) 88'
FW	23	(Italy) Éder	(yellow card) 59'	(substituted off) 66'
Substitutes:
GK	12	(Brazil) Alisson
GK	24	(Brazil) Kauã
DF	13	(Brazil) Rayan
DF	14	(Brazil) Cristovam	(yellow card) 83'	(substituted in) 73'
DF	16	(Brazil) Hélder Santos		(substituted in) 66'
MF	5	(Brazil) Crystopher		(substituted in) 73'
MF	9	(Brazil) Alexandre Tam
MF	15	(Brazil) Léo Costa		(substituted in) 88'
MF	20	(Brazil) Ítalo
FW	18	(Brazil) João Carlos
FW	19	(Brazil) Lohan		(substituted in) 66'
FW	21	(Brazil) Tiago Marques
Coach:
(Brazil) Cláudio Tencati

Assistant referees:
Alex dos Santos
Thiaggo Americano Labes
Fourth official:
Charly Wendy Straub Deretti
Fifth official:
André Eduardo da Silveira
Video assistant referee:
Héber Lopes
Assistant video assistant referees:
Helton Nunes

== Top goalscorers ==
Rank	Player	Team	Goals
1	Waguininho	Avaí	5
2	Maxwell	Chapecoense	4
2	Olávio	Brusque	4
