= 2024 Criciúma Esporte Clube season =

Criciúma Esporte Clube
2024 season
- Manager: Cláudio Tencati
- Stadium: Estádio Heriberto Hülse
- Série A: 18th (relegated)
- Campeonato Catarinense: Winners
- Copa do Brasil: Third round
- Recopa Catarinense: Winners
- Top goalscorer: League: Matheusinho (3); All: Matheusinho (3)
- Average home league attendance: 14,203
Home colours	Away colours	Third colours

The 2024 season was the 93rd season in the history of Criciúma Esporte Clube and the second consecutive season in the top division. They played in the Série A and the Campeonato Catarinense.

== Competitions ==
=== Overall record ===
Competition	First match	Last match	Starting round	Final position	Record							
Competition	First match	Last match	Starting round	Final position	Pld	W	D	L	GF	GA	GD	Win %
Série A	14 April 2024	8 December 2024	Matchday 1	18th	38	9	11	18	42	61	−19	23.68
Campeonato Catarinense	January 2024	6 April 2024	First stage	Winners	17	11	3	3	26	14	+12	64.71
Copa do Brasil	14 April 2024	23 May 2024	Second round	Third round	4	0	2	2	1	4	−3	0.00
Recopa Catarinense	16 January 2024		Final	Winners	1	1	0	0	2	0	+2	100.00
Total					60	21	16	23	71	79	−8	35.00

Source: Soccerway

=== Recopa Catarinense ===
16 January 2024	Criciúma	2–0	Marcílio Dias	Criciúma
21:30 UTC−3	Felipe Vizeu 31'; Éder 39'	Report		Stadium: Estádio Heriberto Hülse; Attendance: 10,037; Referee: Gustavo Ervino Bauermann

=== Campeonato Catarinense ===
==== First stage ====
20 January 2024 1	Criciúma	4–1	Figueirense	Criciúma
16:30 UTC−3	Rodrigo 16'; Marcelo Hermes 59'; Renato Kayzer 68'; João Carlos 72'	Report	Léo Baiano 57'	Stadium: Estádio Heriberto Hülse; Attendance: 10,186; Referee: Bráulio da Silva Machado

24 January 2024 2	Concórdia	1–2	Criciúma	Concórdia
19:00 UTC−3	Perema 90+3'	Report	Rodrigo 11'; Marquinhos Gabriel 76' (pen.)	Stadium: Estádio Domingos Machado de Lima; Attendance: 1,054; Referee: Diego da Costa Cidral

28 January 2024 3	Criciúma	2–0	Hercílio Luz	Criciúma
19:00 UTC−3	Marquinhos Gabriel 19'; Felipe Vizeu 27'	Report		Stadium: Estádio Heriberto Hülse; Attendance: 11,529; Referee: Edson da Silva

31 January 2024 4	Marcílio Dias	1–0	Criciúma	Itajaí
20:00 UTC−3	Juninho Tardelli 33'	Report		Stadium: Estádio Hercílio Luz; Attendance: 3,402; Referee: Ramon Abatti Abel

3 February 2024 5	Criciúma	1–0	Nação	Criciúma
18:30 UTC−3	Marquinhos Gabriel 45'	Report		Stadium: Estádio Heriberto Hülse; Attendance: 8,114; Referee: Franciel dos Santos Martins

7 February 2024 6	Criciúma	1–0	Barra	Criciúma
20:00 UTC−3	Felipe Vizeu 55'	Report		Stadium: Estádio Heriberto Hülse; Attendance: 10,492; Referee: Fernando Henrique de Medeiros Miranda

12 February 2024 7	Avaí	2–3	Criciúma	Florianópolis
19:00 UTC−3	Andrey 79'; Maurício Garcez 83'	Report	Renato Kayzer 5'; Felipe Vizeu 12' (pen.); Fellipe Mateus 54'	Stadium: Estádio da Ressacada; Attendance: 5,833; Referee: Gustavo Ervino Bauermann

15 February 2024 8	Criciúma	1–2	Brusque	Criciúma
19:00 UTC−3	Claudinho 29'	Report	Rodolfo Potiguar 48'; Candelo 86' (o.g.)	Stadium: Estádio Heriberto Hülse; Attendance: 11,331; Referee: Diego da Costa Cidral

18 February 2024 9	Internacional de Lages	0–1	Criciúma	Lages
17:00 UTC−3		Report	Éder 29'	Stadium: Estádio Vidal Ramos Júnior; Attendance: 2,399; Referee: Edson da Silva

24 February 2024 10	Joinville	0–0	Criciúma	Joinville
19:00 UTC−3		Report		Stadium: Arena Joinville; Attendance: 8,656; Referee: Bráulio da Silva Machado

2 March 2024 11	Criciúma	2–0	Chapecoense	Criciúma
16:30 UTC−3	Ángel 42'; Felipe Vizeu 86'	Report		Stadium: Estádio Heriberto Hülse; Attendance: 11,125; Referee: Edson da Silva

==== Quarter-finals ====
9 March 2024 First leg	Hercílio Luz	1–1	Criciúma	Tubarão
18:00 UTC−3	Anderson Ligeiro 48'	Report	Claudinho 7'	Stadium: Estádio Aníbal Torres Costa; Attendance: 2,393; Referee: Rafael Traci

17 March 2024 Second leg	Criciúma	2–1 (3–2 agg.)	Hercílio Luz	Criciúma
19:30 UTC−3	Éder 29'; Renato Kayzer 40'	Report	Anderson Ligeiro 23'	Stadium: Estádio Heriberto Hülse; Attendance: 14,041; Referee: Ramon Abatti Abel

==== Semi-finals ====
21 March 2024 First leg	Barra	2–1	Criciúma	Itajaí
20:30 UTC−3	Marcelinho 48' (pen.); Wesley Matos 55'	Report	Claudinho 14'	Stadium: Estádio Hercílio Luz; Attendance: 2,071; Referee: Rafael Traci

24 March 2024 Second leg	Criciúma	2–1 (3–3 agg.) (4–3 p)	Barra	Criciúma
16:00 UTC−3	Fellipe Mateus 6'; Renato Kayzer 37'	Report	Wesley Matos 45+2'	Stadium: Estádio Heriberto Hülse; Attendance: 15,028; Referee: Ramon Abatti Abel
	Penalties
	Fellipe Mateus (penalty scored); Barreto (penalty missed); Claudinho (penalty scored); Marcelo Hermes (penalty scored); Éder (penalty scored)		(penalty scored) DG; (penalty missed) Thiago Santos; (penalty scored) Adilson Bahia; (penalty missed) Álvaro; (penalty scored) Roldan

==== Finals ====
30 March 2024 First leg	Brusque	1–2	Criciúma	Itajaí
16:30 UTC−3	Guilherme Queiróz 75' (pen.)	Report	Tobias Figueiredo 26'; Fellipe Mateus 64' (pen.)	Stadium: Estádio Hercílio Luz; Attendance: 3,473; Referee: Bráulio da Silva Machado

6 April 2024 Second leg	Criciúma	1–1 (3–2 agg.)	Brusque	Criciúma
16:30 UTC−3	Higor Meritão 3'	Report	Gustavo 46' (o.g.)	Stadium: Estádio Heriberto Hülse; Attendance: 18,593; Referee: Ramon Abatti Abel

=== Série A ===
==== League table ====
Pos	Team	Pld	W	D	L	GF	GA	GD	Pts	Qualification or relegation
16	Red Bull Bragantino	38	10	14	14	44	48	−4	44	
17	Athletico Paranaense (R)	38	11	9	18	40	46	−6	42	Relegation to Campeonato Brasileiro Série B
18	Criciúma (R)	38	9	11	18	42	61	−19	38	Relegation to Campeonato Brasileiro Série B
19	Atlético Goianiense (R)	38	7	9	22	29	58	−29	30	Relegation to Campeonato Brasileiro Série B
20	Cuiabá (R)	38	6	12	20	29	49	−20	30	Relegation to Campeonato Brasileiro Série B

Source: CBF
Rules for classification: 1) points; 2) wins; 3) goal difference; 4) goals scored; 5) head-to-head results (only between two teams); 6) fewest red cards; 7) fewest yellow cards; 8) drawing of lots.
(R) Relegated

==== Matches ====
The match schedule was released on 29 February.

13 April 2024 1	Criciúma	1–1	Juventude	Criciúma
18:30 UTC−3	Renato Kayzer 36'	Report	Jean Carlos 64'	Stadium: Estádio Heriberto Hülse; Attendance: 12,408; Referee: Bruno Pereira Vasconcelos (Bahia)

17 April 2024 2	Atlético Mineiro	1–1	Criciúma	Belo Horizonte
20:00 UTC−3	Gustavo Scarpa 40'	Report	Matheusinho 84'	Stadium: Arena MRV; Attendance: 24,613; Referee: Paulo Belence Alves dos Prazeres Filho (Pernambuco)

27 April 2024 4	Vasco	0–4	Criciúma	Rio de Janeiro
16:00 UTC−3		Report	Fellipe Mateus 32', 47'; Bolasie 55'; Higor Meritão 69'	Stadium: Estádio São Januário; Attendance: 17,607; Referee: Caio Max Augusto Vieira (Rio Grande do Norte)

2024 5	Grêmio	v	Criciúma
--:-- UTC−3
Note: Match postponed due to the 2024 Rio Grande do Sul floods.

2 June 2024 7	Criciúma	1–2	Palmeiras	Criciúma
16:00 UTC−3	Matheusinho 69'	Report	Gómez 67' (pen.); Lázaro 90+2'	Stadium: Helibelto Hülse; Attendance: 19,027; Referee: Rafael Rodrigo Klein (Rio Grande do Sul)

9 June 2024 6	Criciúma	2–5	Cuiabá	Criciúma
16:00 UTC−3	Matheusinho 63'; Tobias Figueiredo 65'	Report	Pitta 16'; Clayson 23', 35'; Max 46'; Ramon 90+5'	Stadium: Estádio Heriberto Hülse; Attendance: 13,846; Referee: Bruno Arleu de Araújo (Rio de Janeiro)

13 June 2024 8	Athletico Paranaense	3–1	Criciúma	Curitiba
20:00 UTC−3	Mastriani 23', 54'; Cuello 79'	Report	Barreto 8'	Stadium: Arena da Baixada; Attendance: 22,515; Referee: Jonathan Benkenstein Pinheiro (Rio Grande do Sul)

16 June 2024 9	Criciúma	2–2	Bahia	Criciúma
18:30 UTC−3	Marcelo Hermes 34'; Arthur Caíke 46'	Report	Everaldo 56'; Caio Alexandre 72'	Stadium: Estádio Heriberto Hülse; Attendance: 8,661; Referee: Flávio Rodrigues de Souza (São Paulo)

19 June 2024 10	Atlético Goianiense	1–2	Criciúma	Goiânia
19:00 UTC−3	Guilherme Romão 11'	Report	Newton 60'; Trauco 90+13'	Stadium: Estádio Antônio Accioly; Attendance: 6,478; Referee: Alex Gomes Stefano (Rio de Janeiro)

22 June 2024 11	Criciúma	2–1	Botafogo	Criciúma
16:00 UTC−3	Barreto 10'; Arthur 84'	Report	Halter 55'	Stadium: Estádio Heriberto Hülse; Attendance: 16,256; Referee: Luiz Flávio de Oliveira (São Paulo)

27 June 2024 12	São Paulo	2–1	Criciúma	São Paulo
20:00 UTC−3	Alisson 1'; Luciano 22'	Report	Arthur Caíke 90+2'	Stadium: Estádio do Morumbi; Attendance: 28,008; Referee: Bruno Pereira Vasconcelos (Bahia)

30 June 2024 13	Criciúma	1–1	Internacional	Criciúma
18:30 UTC−3	Claudinho 79'	Report	Bruno Henrique 40'	Stadium: Estádio Heriberto Hülse; Attendance: 15,859; Referee: Wagner do Nascimento Magalhães (Rio de Janeiro)

3 July 2024 14	Criciúma	1–0	Cruzeiro	Criciúma
20:00 UTC−3	Bolasie 46'	Report		Stadium: Estádio Heriberto Hülse; Attendance: 12,352; Referee: João Vitor Gobi (São Paulo)

7 July 2024 15	Vitória	2–1	Criciúma	Salvador
18:30 UTC−3	Alerrandro 31' (pen.); Lucas Esteves 37'	Report	Matheusinho 43'	Stadium: Barradão; Attendance: 16,489; Referee: Bruno Mota Correia (Rio de Janeiro)

24 July 2024 3	Criciúma	v	Fortaleza	Criciúma
19:00 UTC−3		Report		Stadium: Estádio Heriberto Hülse
Note: Match postponed due to the Fortaleza involvement in the 2024 Copa do Nordeste.

=== Copa do Brasil ===
==== First round ====
28 February 2024	Operário (Mato Grosso)	0–0	(Santa Catarina (state)) Criciúma	Cuiabá
21:30 UTC−3		Report		Stadium: Arena Pantanal; Attendance: 940; Referee: Flávio Rodrigues de Souza (São Paulo)
Note: Criciúma advanced to the next round by being a better ranked team.

==== Second round ====
14 April 2024	Brasiliense (Federal District (Brazil))	1–1 (1–3 p)	(Santa Catarina (state)) Criciúma	Taguatinga
19:00 UTC−3	Wallace 53' (pen.)	Report	Éder 3'	Stadium: Serejão; Attendance: 2,501; Referee: Wagner do Nascimento Magalhães (Rio de Janeiro)
	Penalties
	Gustavo Lila (penalty missed); Gustavão (penalty missed); Dandan (penalty missed); Wallace (penalty scored)		(penalty missed) Fellipe Mateus; (penalty scored) Marcelo Hermes; (penalty scored) Higor Meritão; (penalty scored) Renato Kayzer

==== Third round ====
30 April 2024 First leg	Bahia	1–0	(Santa Catarina (state)) Criciúma	Salvador
19:00 UTC−3	Thaciano 56'	Report		Stadium: Casa de Apostas Arena Fonte Nova; Attendance: 37,005; Referee: Marcelo de Lima Henrique (Ceará)

23 May 2024 Second leg	Criciúma (Santa Catarina (state))	0–2 (0–3 agg.)	Bahia	Criciúma
19:00 UTC−3		Report	de Pena 89'; Jean Lucas 90+3'	Stadium: Estádio Heriberto Hülse; Attendance: 14,316; Referee: Raphael Claus (São Paulo)
