= 2024 Brusque Futebol Clube season =

Brusque
2024 season
- Manager: Luizinho Vieira (from 20 May)
- Stadium: Estádio Augusto Bauer
- Série B: 19th
- Campeonato Catarinense: Taça Guanabara
- Copa do Brasil: First round
| Home colours | Away colours |

The 2024 season is Brusque's 37th in existence. They will play in the Série B and the Campeonato Catarinense and the Copa do Brasil.

== Players ==
=== First-team squad ===
As of 21 August 2024

Note: Flags indicate national team as defined under FIFA eligibility rules; some limited exceptions apply. Players may hold more than one non-FIFA nationality.

| No. | Pos. | Nation | Player |
|---|---|---|---|
| 1 | GK | BRA | Matheus Nogueira |
| 2 | DF | BRA | Éverton Alemão |
| 3 | DF | BRA | Ianson |
| 4 | DF | BRA | Wallace (captain) |
| 5 | MF | BRA | Rodolfo Potiguar |
| 7 | MF | BRA | Dionísio (on loan from Vitória) |
| 8 | MF | BRA | Jhemerson (on loan from Tombense) |
| 9 | FW | BRA | Olávio |
| 10 | FW | BRA | Dentinho |
| 11 | FW | BRA | Diego Tavares |
| 12 | DF | BRA | Marcelo |
| 15 | DF | BRA | Ronei |
| 17 | FW | BRA | Guilherme Queiróz |
| 18 | FW | BRA | Keké (on loan from Tombense) |
| 19 | MF | BRA | Marcos Serrato |
| 21 | DF | BRA | Luiz Henrique (on loan from Juventus Jaraguá) |

| No. | Pos. | Nation | Player |
|---|---|---|---|
| 22 | DF | BRA | Cristovam |
| 27 | FW | BRA | Diego Mathias |
| 28 | DF | BRA | Maurício |
| 29 | FW | BRA | Wellissol |
| 31 | GK | BRA | Matheus Emiliano |
| 33 | MF | BRA | Madison |
| 35 | GK | BRA | Georgemy |
| 66 | DF | BRA | Alex Ruan |
| 80 | FW | BRA | Osman Júnior |
| 94 | FW | BRA | Paulinho Moccelin |
| 99 | DF | BRA | Mateus Pivô (on loan from Sampaio Corrêa) |
| — | MF | URU | Agustín González |
| — | MF | BRA | Lorran |
| — | FW | BRA | Luizinho (on loan from Inter de Lages) |
| — | FW | URU | Matías Ocampo (on loan from Liverpool Montevideo) |
| — | FW | URU | Rodrigo Pollero (on loan from Bellinzona) |

=== Youth team ===
Note: Flags indicate national team as defined under FIFA eligibility rules; some limited exceptions apply. Players may hold more than one non-FIFA nationality.

| No. | Pos. | Nation | Player |
|---|---|---|---|
| 12 | FW | BRA | Neto |
| 20 | FW | BRA | Robinho |

| No. | Pos. | Nation | Player |
|---|---|---|---|
| 51 | MF | BRA | Pedro Vitor |
| — | MF | BRA | Guto |

=== Out on loan ===
Note: Flags indicate national team as defined under FIFA eligibility rules; some limited exceptions apply. Players may hold more than one non-FIFA nationality.

| No. | Pos. | Nation | Player |
|---|---|---|---|
| — | GK | BRA | Jordan (at Sport Recife until 30 November 2024) |
| — | DF | BRA | Iran (at Náutico until 30 November 2024) |

| No. | Pos. | Nation | Player |
|---|---|---|---|
| — | MF | BRA | Patrick Machado (at Volta Redonda until 30 November 2024) |

== Competitions ==
=== Overall record ===
| Competition | First match | Last match | Starting round | Record | | | | | | | |
| Competition | First match | Last match | Starting round | Pld | W | D | L | GF | GA | GD | Win % |
|---|---|---|---|---|---|---|---|---|---|---|---|
| Série B | April 2024 | December 2024 | Matchday 1 | 0 | 0 | 0 | 0 | 0 | 0 | +0 | — |
| Campeonato Catarinense | January 2024 | | | 0 | 0 | 0 | 0 | 0 | 0 | +0 | — |
| Copa do Brasil | | | First round | 0 | 0 | 0 | 0 | 0 | 0 | +0 | — |
| Total | | | | 0 | 0 | 0 | 0 | 0 | 0 | +0 | — |

Source: [ Soccerway]

=== Série B ===
==== League table ====
| Pos | Team | Pld | W | D | L | GF | GA | GD | Pts | Promotion or relegation |
|---|---|---|---|---|---|---|---|---|---|---|
| 16 | CRB | 38 | 11 | 10 | 17 | 38 | 45 | −7 | 43 | |
| 17 | Ponte Preta (R) | 38 | 10 | 8 | 20 | 37 | 55 | −18 | 38 | Relegation to 2025 Campeonato Brasileiro Série C |
| 18 | Ituano (R) | 38 | 11 | 4 | 23 | 43 | 63 | −20 | 37 | Relegation to 2025 Campeonato Brasileiro Série C |
| 19 | Brusque (R) | 38 | 8 | 12 | 18 | 24 | 44 | −20 | 36 | Relegation to 2025 Campeonato Brasileiro Série C |
| 20 | Guarani (R) | 38 | 8 | 9 | 21 | 33 | 53 | −20 | 33 | Relegation to 2025 Campeonato Brasileiro Série C |

Source: CBF
Rules for classification: 1) points; 2) wins; 3) goal difference; 4) goals scored; 5) head-to-head results (only between 2 teams); 6) fewest red cards; 7) fewest yellow cards; 8) drawing of lots.
(R) Relegated

==== Results summary ====
| Overall | | | | | | | | Home | | | | | | Away | | | | | |
| Pld | W | D | L | GF | GA | GD | Pts | W | D | L | GF | GA | GD | W | D | L | GF | GA | GD |
|---|---|---|---|---|---|---|---|---|---|---|---|---|---|---|---|---|---|---|---|
| 0 | 0 | 0 | 0 | 0 | 0 | 0 | 0 | 0 | 0 | 0 | 0 | 0 | 0 | 0 | 0 | 0 | 0 | 0 | 0 |

==== Results by round ====
| Round | 1 | 2 | 3 | 4 | 5 | 6 | 7 | 8 | 9 | 10 | 11 | 12 | 13 | 14 | 15 | 16 | 17 | 18 | 19 | 20 | 21 | 22 | 23 | 24 |
|---|---|---|---|---|---|---|---|---|---|---|---|---|---|---|---|---|---|---|---|---|---|---|---|---|
| Ground | H | A | H | A | H | A | A | H | A | H | H | A | A | H | A | A | H | A | H | A | H | A | H | A |
| Result | W | L | L | L | D | L | D | D | L | W | D | D | D | D | D | D | W | L | D | L | L | L | W | |
| Position | 1 | 8 | 12 | 16 | 15 | 16 | 17 | 19 | 19 | 18 | 18 | 18 | 18 | 18 | 18 | 18 | 18 | 18 | 18 | 18 | 19 | 19 | 18 | |

Updated to match(es) played on 28 August 2024. Source: Worldfootball
A = Away; H = Home; W = Win; D = Draw; L = Loss

==== Matches ====
The match schedule was released on 6 March.

| 23 April 2024 4 | Brusque | 3–1 | Mirassol |
| 21:00 UTC−3 |

| 28 April 2024 5 | Coritiba | 1–0 | Brusque |
| 21:00 UTC−3 |

| 5 May 2024 6 | Brusque | 0–2 | Goiás |
| 21:00 UTC−3 |

| 11 May 2024 7 | Sport | 4–1 | Brusque |
| 21:00 UTC−3 |

| 15 May 2024 8 | Brusque | 0–0 | Operário Ferroviário |
| 21:00 UTC−3 |

| 19 May 2024 9 | Santos | 4–0 | Brusque |
| 21:00 UTC−3 |

| 26 May 2024 10 | Vila Nova | 2–2 | Brusque |
| 21:00 UTC−3 |

| 1 June 2024 11 | Brusque | 0–0 | Novorizontino |
| 21:00 UTC−3 |

| 8 June 2024 12 | Amazonas | 2–1 | Brusque |
| 21:00 UTC−3 |

| 16 June 2024 13 | Brusque | 1–0 | Ceará |
| 21:00 UTC−3 |

| 19 June 2024 14 | Brusque | 0–0 | Avaí |
| 21:00 UTC−3 |

| 22 June 2024 15 | Ituano | 1–1 | Brusque |
| 21:00 UTC−3 |

| 1 July 2024 16 | CRB | 1–1 | Brusque |
| 21:00 UTC−3 |

| 5 July 2024 17 | Brusque | 0–0 | Ponte Preta |
| 21:00 UTC−3 |

| 14 July 2024 18 | Chapecoense | 1–1 | Brusque |
| 21:00 UTC−3 |

| 21 July 2024 19 | Botafogo-SP | 2–2 | Brusque |
| 21:00 UTC−3 |

| 24 July 2024 | Brusque | 1–0 | Paysandu |
| 21:00 UTC−3 |

| 28 July 2024 20 | Guarani | 1–0 | Brusque |
| 21:00 UTC−3 |

| 2 August 2024 21 | Brusque | 0–0 | América Mineiro |
| 21:00 UTC−3 |

| 9 August 2024 22 | Mirassol | 2–0 | Brusque |
| 21:00 UTC−3 |

| 18 August 2024 23 | Brusque | 0–1 | Coritiba |
| 21:00 UTC−3 |

| 21 August 2024 24 | Goiás | 4–1 | Brusque |
| 21:00 UTC−3 |

| 27 August 2024 25 | Brusque | 1–0 | Sport |
| 21:00 UTC−3 |

| 2 September 2024 24 | Operário Ferroviário | v | Brusque | Ponta Grossa |
| 21:30 UTC−3 | | | | Stadium: Estádio Germano Krüger |

=== Copa do Brasil ===
==== Second round ====
| 12 March 2024 Second round | ABC | 1–1 (4–5 p) | Brusque |
| 16:00 UTC−3 |

==== Third round ====
| 1 May 2024 First leg | Brusque | 0–1 | Atlético Goianiense | Brusque |
| 16:00 UTC−3 | | | | Stadium: Estádio Augusto Bauer |

| 22 May 2024 Second leg | Atlético Goianiense | 4–2 (5–2 agg.) | Brusque | Goiânia |
| 19:00 UTC−3 | | | | Stadium: Estádio Antônio Accioly |
