= Eliedson =

Brazilian footballer

Personal information
- Full name: Eliedson Pereira de Souza
- Date of birth: 17 March 2003 (age 23)
- Place of birth: Jaguaruna, Brazil
- Position: Defensive midfielder

Youth career
- 2005–2024: Criciúma

Senior career*
Years	Team	Apps	(Gls)
2022–2026	Criciúma	25	(0)
2025	→ Caxias (loan)	5	(0)
Total		30	(0)
- * Club domestic league appearances and goals

Eliedson Pereira de Souza (born 17 March 2003), simply known as Eliedson, is a Brazilian retired footballer. Mainly a defensive midfielder, he could also play as a centre-back.

== Career ==
Born in Jaguaruna, Santa Catarina, Eliedson joined Criciúma's youth setup at the age of 12. He made his first team debut on 13 June 2022, starting in a 3–1 Campeonato Catarinense Série B home win over Atlético Catarinense.

After another first team appearance, Eliedson returned to the under-20s, and was only promoted to the main squad again in January 2024. During the 2024 Campeonato Catarinense, he became a starter at Cláudio Tencati's side.

Eliedson made his Série A debut on 17 April 2024, coming on as a late substitute for Fellipe Mateus in a 1–1 away draw against Atlético Mineiro. He subsequently lost space in the 2025 season, and was loaned to Caxias on 11 April of that year.

Back to Criciúma on 15 August 2025, Eliedson only played for a B-side in the Copa Santa Catarina, and announced his retirement at the age of 22 on 23 January 2026.

== Career statistics ==
Club	Season	League			State League		Cup		Continental		Other		Total	
Club	Season	Division	Apps	Goals	Apps	Goals	Apps	Goals	Apps	Goals	Apps	Goals	Apps	Goals
Criciúma	2022	Série B	0	0	2	0	0	0	—		—		2	0
Criciúma	2023	Série B	0	0	0	0	0	0	—		—		0	0
Criciúma	2024	Série A	5	0	13	0	2	0	—		1 (Note: Appearance(s) in Recopa Catarinense)	0	21	0
Criciúma	2025	Série B	0	0	5	0	0	0	—		5 (Note: Appearance(s) in Copa Santa Catarina)	0	10	0
Criciúma	Total		5	0	20	0	2	0	0	0	6	0	33	0
Caxias (loan)	2025	Série C	5	0	—		—		—		—		5	0
Career total			10	0	20	0	2	0	0	0	6	0	38	0

== Honours ==
Criciúma

- Campeonato Catarinense Série B: 2022
- Campeonato Catarinense: 2023
- Recopa Catarinense: 2024
