= 2025 Criciúma Esporte Clube season =

Criciúma Esporte Clube
2025 season
- Stadium: Estádio Heriberto Hülse
- Série B: Pre-season
- Campeonato Catarinense: Pre-season
- Copa do Brasil: Pre-season
- Average home league attendance: 10,486

The 2025 season is the 78th competitive year for Criciúma Esporte Clube. The club will participate in the Campeonato Brasileiro Série B after relegation, the Campeonato Catarinense, and the Copa do Brasil.

== Squad ==
=== Transfers In ===
Pos.	Player	Transferred from	Fee	Date	Source
MF	(Brazil) Everton Morelli	(Brazil) Maringá	Loan	3 January 2025	
MF	(Brazil) Juninho	(Brazil) Goiás	Free	3 January 2025	
MF	(Brazil) Matheus Trindade	(Brazil) Paysandu	Free	3 January 2025	
FW	(Brazil) Talisson	(Brazil) Red Bull Bragantino	Loan	4 January 2025	
MF	(Brazil) Luiz Henrique	(Brazil) Goiás	Free	7 January 2025	
DF	(Brazil) Léo Alaba	(Portugal) AVS	Loan	9 January 2025	
GK	(Brazil) Caíque	(Brazil) Grêmio	R$ 250,000	16 January 2025	

=== Transfers Out ===
Pos.	Player	Transferred to	Fee	Date	Source
FW	(Brazil) Felipe Vizeu	(Brazil) Remo	Undisclosed	1 January 2025	
DF	(Venezuela) Wilker Ángel			1 January 2025	
FW	(Democratic Republic of the Congo) Yannick Bolasie	(Brazil) Cruzeiro	Undisclosed	1 January 2025	
DF	(Peru) Miguel Trauco	(Peru) Alianza Lima	Free	6 January 2025	
GK	(Brazil) Alisson	(Brazil) Paysandu	Undisclosed	8 January 2025	
GK	(Brazil) Gustavo	(Brazil) Juventude	Undisclosed	13 January 2025	
DF	(Brazil) Guilherme Silva	(Brazil) Santa Catarina	Contract terminated	14 January 2025	

== Competitions ==
=== Overall record ===
Competition	First match	Last match	Starting round	Record							
Competition	First match	Last match	Starting round	Pld	W	D	L	GF	GA	GD	Win %
Série B	5 April 2025	22 November 2025	Matchday 1	0	0	0	0	0	0	+0	—
Campeonato Catarinense	19 January 2025			1	1	0	0	2	0	+2	100.00
Copa do Brasil				0	0	0	0	0	0	+0	—
Total				1	1	0	0	2	0	+2	100.00

Last updated: 19 January 2025
Source: Competitions

=== Série B ===
==== League table ====
Pos	Team	Pld	W	D	L	GF	GA	GD	Pts	Promotion or relegation
3	Chapecoense (P)	38	18	8	12	52	35	+17	62	Promotion to 2026 Campeonato Brasileiro Série A
4	Remo (P)	38	16	14	8	51	39	+12	62	Promotion to 2026 Campeonato Brasileiro Série A
5	Criciúma	38	17	10	11	47	33	+14	61	
6	Goiás	38	17	10	11	42	37	+5	61	
7	Novorizontino	38	15	15	8	43	32	+11	60	

Source: CBF
Rules for classification: 1) points; 2) wins; 3) goal difference; 4) goals scored; 5) head-to-head results (only between 2 teams); 6) fewest red cards; 7) fewest yellow cards; 8) drawing of lots.
(P) Promoted

==== Matches ====
29 July 2025 19	Criciúma	1–0	Cuiabá

1 August 2025 20	Operário Ferroviário	1–0	Criciúma

11 August 2025 21	Criciúma	4–2	Athletico Paranaense

18 August 2025 22	Athletic Club	1–1	Criciúma

=== Campeonato Catarinense ===
==== Results by round ====
Round	1	2
Ground		H
Result		
Position		

Updated to match(es) played on 19 January 2025. Source:
A = Away; H = Home; W = Win; D = Draw; L = Loss

19 January 2025 1	Criciúma	2–0	Concórdia
16:00 UTC−3

22 January 2025 3	Figueirense	2–3	Criciúma	Florianópolis
21:00 UTC−3	Iury (yellow card) 45+1'; Gabriel Santiago 61'; Jhony Douglas 83'	Report	Everton Morelli 18'; Eduardo Melo (yellow card) 23' (goal) 36'; Juninho 77'	Stadium: Estádio Orlando Scarpelli; Attendance: 6,535; Referee: (Brazil) Cinesio Mendes Junior

26 January 2025 4	Criciúma	1–1	Barra	Criciúma
18:30	Fellipe Mateus 35'; Petterson (yellow card) 82'	Report	Natan (yellow card) 4' (goal) 80'; Saymon (yellow card) 89'; Ewerton (yellow card) 90'	Stadium: Estádio Heriberto Hülse; Attendance: 7,923; Referee: (Brazil) Adriano de Souza

30 January 2025 5	Criciúma	3–0	Joinville	Criciúma
21:00	Werik Popó (yellow card) 16'; Juninho 19'; Fellipe Mateus (yellow card) 41'; Neto Pessoa 62'; Marcelo Hermes 88' (pen.); Jhonata Robert (yellow card) 90'	Report	Carlos Alexandre (yellow card) 40'	Stadium: Estádio Heriberto Hülse; Attendance: 8,383; Referee: (Brazil) Braulio da Silva Machado

1 February 2025 6	Chapecoense	0–0	Criciúma	Chapecó
16:00		Report		Stadium: Arena Condá; Attendance: 1,356; Referee: (Brazil) Rafael Traci

6 February 2025 7	Criciúma	1–1	Santa Catarina	Criciúma
21:00	Juninho 63'	Report	Guilherme (yellow card) 88'; Brener 90+2'	Stadium: Estádio Heriberto Hülse; Attendance: 8,762; Referee: (Brazil) Rodrigo D'Alonso Ferreira

=== Copa do Brasil ===
==== Third round ====
The draw was held on 9 April 2025.

1 May 2025 First leg	Criciúma	1–0	Red Bull Bragantino	Criciúma
18:30 UTC−3	Matheus Trindade 54'	Report		Stadium: Heriberto Hülse; Referee: Felipe Fernandes de Lima

22 May 2025 Second leg	Red Bull Bragantino	v	Criciúma	Bragança Paulista
21:30 UTC−3		Report		Stadium: Nabi Abi Chedid
