= 2026 Criciúma Esporte Clube season =

Criciúma Esporte Clube
2026 season
- Manager: Eduardo Baptista (until 23 September); Umberto Louzer (from 24 September)
- Stadium: Estádio Heriberto Hülse
- Campeonato Brasileiro Série B: 5th
- Promotion play-offs: Semi-finals
- Top goalscorer: League: Fellipe Mateus (6); All: Fellipe Mateus (6)

In the 2026 season, Criciúma Esporte Clube competes in the Campeonato Brasileiro Série B and the Campeonato Catarinense.

== Transfers ==
=== In ===
Pos.	Player	Transferred from	Fee	Date	Source
MF	(Brazil) Eduardo	(South Korea) FC Anyang	Free	2 January 2026	
DF	(Brazil) César Martins	(Brazil) Novorizontino	Free	5 January 2026	
MF	(Brazil) Willean Lepo	(Brazil) Vitória	Loan	6 January 2026	
FW	(Brazil) Yuri Tanque	(South Korea) Jeju SK	Free	15 January 2026	
MF	(Brazil) Jean Irmer	(Brazil) Novorizontino	Undisclosed	27 January 2026	
DF	(Brazil) Bruno Alves	(Brazil) Cuiabá	Free	5 February 2026	
FW	(Venezuela) Rómulo Otero	(Uruguay) Nacional	Loan	7 February 2026	
GK	(Brazil) Airton	(Brazil) Vila Nova	Free	2 March 2026	
FW	(Brazil) Romarinho	(Brazil) Sport	Free	5 March 2026	
MF	(Brazil) Ronald	(Brazil) Vitória	Loan	26 June 2026	

== Competitions ==
=== Campeonato Brasileiro Série B ===
Pos	Team	Pld	W	D	L	GF	GA	GD	Pts	Promotion or relegation
3	Vila Nova	38	19	9	10	53	39	+14	66	Advance to the promotion play-offs
4	Fortaleza	38	17	14	7	45	33	+12	65	Advance to the promotion play-offs
5	Criciúma	38	18	8	12	38	32	+6	62	Advance to the promotion play-offs
6	Atlético Goianiense	38	16	13	9	46	35	+11	61	Advance to the promotion play-offs
7	CRB	38	17	8	13	58	52	+6	59	

Source: CBF
Rules for classification: 1) points; 2) wins; 3) goal difference; 4) goals scored; 5) head-to-head results (only between 2 teams); 6) fewest red cards; 7) fewest yellow cards; 8) drawing of lots.

Round	1	2	3	4	5	6	7	8	9	10	11	12	13	14	15	16	17	18	19	20	21	22	23	24	25	26	27	28	29	30	31	32	33	34	35	36	37	38
Ground	A	H	A	H	A	H	A	A	H	A	A	H	H	A	H	H	A	H	A	H	A	H	A	H	A	H	H	A	H	H	A	A	H	A	A	H	A	H
Result	W	D	L	W	L	W	D	D	D	D	W	W	D	W	W	W	W	W	W	D	L	W	D	L	L	W	L	L	L	W	W	L	W	W	L	W	L	L
Position	6	7	12	7	10	4	6	7	8	9	8	6	6	5	3	3	1	1	1	1	1	1	1	2	3	2	5	5	6	5	4	5	5	5	5	4	4	5

A = Away; H = Home; W = Win; D = Draw; L = Loss

==== Matches ====
22 March 2026 1	Náutico	0–1	Criciúma
16:00 UTC−3

1 April 2026 2	Criciúma	1–1	Athletic
21:30 UTC−3

6 April 2026 3	Goiás	1–0	Criciúma
21:00 UTC−3

10 April 2026 4	Criciúma	1–0	Botafogo-SP
20:30 UTC−3

19 April 2026 5	Fortaleza	3–2	Criciúma
20:00 UTC−3

26 April 2026 6	Criciúma	3–1	CRB
20:30 UTC−3

2 May 2026 7	Cuiabá	1–1	Criciúma
18:30 UTC−3

9 May 2026 9	Juventude	0–0	Criciúma
21:15 UTC−3

17 May 2026 9	Criciúma	1–1	Atlético Goianiense
18:30 UTC−3

24 May 2026 10	Operário Ferroviário	1–1	Criciúma
20:30 UTC−3

30 May 2026 11	Avaí	1–2	Criciúma
16:00 UTC−3

6 June 2026 12	Criciúma	1–0	Londrina
11:00 UTC−3

15 June 2026 13	Criciúma	1–1	Ceará
21:00 UTC−3

23 June 2026 14	América Mineiro	0–1	Criciúma
20:00 UTC−3

27 June 2026 15	Criciúma	1–0	São Bernardo
16:00 UTC−3

4 July 2026 16	Criciúma	1–0	Sport
16:00 UTC−3

8 July 2026 17	Ponte Preta	1–2	Criciúma
20:00 UTC−3

18 July 2026 18	Criciúma	2–0	Vila Nova
16:00 UTC−3

21 July 2026 19	Novorizontino	0–1	Criciúma
19:30 UTC−3

26 July 2026 20	Criciúma	0–0	Náutico
16:00 UTC−3

9 August 2026 21	Athletic	2–0	Criciúma
11:00 UTC−3

15 August 2026 22	Criciúma	1–0	Goiás
16:00 UTC−3

19 August 2026 23	Botafogo-SP	1–1	Criciúma
21:30 UTC−3

23 August 2026 24	Criciúma	0–2	Fortaleza
18:30 UTC−3

30 August 2026 25	CRB	2–1	Criciúma
18:00 UTC−3

4 September 2026 26	Criciúma	2–0	Cuiabá
19:30 UTC−3

8 September 2026 27	Criciúma	0–2	Juventude
21:00 UTC−3

13 September 2026 28	Atlético Goianiense	4–0	Criciúma
16:00 UTC−3

22 September 2026 29	Criciúma	0–2	Operário Ferroviário
19:30 UTC−3

27 September 2026 30	Criciúma	3–0	Avaí
11:00 UTC−3

2 October 2026 31	Londrina	0–2	Criciúma
20:30 UTC−3

8 October 2026 32	Ceará	1–0	Criciúma
19:30 UTC−3

12 October 2026 33	Criciúma	1–0	América Mineiro
19:30 UTC−3

18 October 2026 34	São Bernardo	0–1	Criciúma
16:00 UTC−3

23 October 2026 35	Sport	2–1	Criciúma
21:00 UTC−3

30 October 2026 36	Criciúma	2–0	Ponte Preta
19:00 UTC−3

7 November 2026 37	Vila Nova	1–0	Criciúma
20:00 UTC−3

14 November 2026 38	Criciúma	0–1	Novorizontino	Criciúma
16:30 UTC−3				Stadium: Estádio Heriberto Hülse

==== Promotion play-offs ====
22 November 2026 First leg	Criciúma	v	Fortaleza	Criciúma
16:00 UTC−3				Stadium: Estádio Heriberto Hülse

28 November 2026 Second leg	Fortaleza	v	Criciúma	Fortaleza
20:00 UTC−3				Stadium: Castelão

=== Campeonato Catarinense ===
7 January 2026 1	Marcílio Dias	2–0	Criciúma
19:00 UTC−3

11 January 2026 2	Criciúma	2–1	Avaí
18:00 UTC−3

15 January 2026 2	Joinville	0–0	Criciúma
20:00 UTC−3

19 January 2026 4	Criciúma	3–1	Concórdia
19:30 UTC−3

22 January 2026 5	Camboriú	1–2	Criciúma
21:30 UTC−3

25 January 2026 6	Criciúma	3–3	Brusque
18:00 UTC−3

==== Quarter-finals ====
1 February 2026 First leg	Criciúma	1–2	Chapecoense
18:00 UTC−3

8 February 2026 Second leg	Chapecoense	0–0 (2–1 agg.)	Criciúma
19:00 UTC−3
