= João Carlos (footballer, born 2001) =

Brazilian footballer

Personal information
- Full name: João Carlos Barros Lopes
- Date of birth: 21 June 2001 (age 25)
- Place of birth: Campo Erê, Brazil
- Height: 1.68 m (5 ft 6 in)
- Position: Forward

Team information
- Current team: Criciúma
- Number: 21

Youth career
- 2015–2016: Brusque
- 2017–2018: Vasco da Gama
- 2019–2021: Criciúma

Senior career*
Years	Team	Apps	(Gls)
2020–	Criciúma	108	(7)
2022	→ Marcílio Dias (loan)	16	(1)
2024	→ Ituano (loan)	16	(1)
- * Club domestic league appearances and goals as of 15 April 2026

João Carlos Barros Lopes (born 21 June 2001), known as João Carlos, is a Brazilian footballer who plays as a forward for Criciúma.

== Career ==
Born in Campo Erê, Santa Catarina, João Carlos began his career with Brusque, and had a short spell at Vasco da Gama before joining the youth sides of Criciúma in 2019. He made his first team debut with the latter on 22 January 2020, starting in a 2–1 Campeonato Catarinense home win over Concórdia.

João Carlos scored his first senior goal on 26 January 2020, netting the equalizer in a 3–2 away loss to Juventus Jaraguá. Regularly used during the 2020 Campeonato Catarinense, he lost his space afterwards, and was loaned to Marcílio Dias on 9 March 2022.

João Carlos helped the Marinheiro to win the 2022 Copa Santa Catarina, and returned to Tigre in January 2023. On 30 January 2024, after being mainly a backup option as the club achieved promotion to the Série A, he renewed his contract until 2025.

== Career statistics ==
As of 16 February 2024

Club	Season	League			State League		Cup		Continental		Other		Total	
Club	Season	Division	Apps	Goals	Apps	Goals	Apps	Goals	Apps	Goals	Apps	Goals	Apps	Goals
Criciúma	2020	Série C	6	0	11	1	0	0	—		—		17	1
Criciúma	2021	Série C	2	0	8	1	2	0	—		4 (Note: Appearance(s) in Copa Santa Catarina)	0	16	1
Criciúma	2023	Série B	16	0	13	1	1	0	—		—		30	1
Criciúma	2024	Série A	0	0	7	1	0	0	—		1 (Note: Appearance(s) in Recopa Catarinense)	0	8	1
Criciúma	Total		24	0	39	4	3	0	—		5	0	71	4
Marcílio Dias (loan)	2022	Série D	14	1	2	0	—		—		13	3	29	4
Career total			38	1	41	4	3	0	0	0	18	3	100	8

== Honours ==
Marcílio Dias

- Copa Santa Catarina: 2022

Criciúma

- Campeonato Catarinense: 2023
- Recopa Catarinense: 2024
