= 2024 Recopa Catarinense =

Criciúma	Marcílio Dias
(Santa Catarina (state))	(Santa Catarina (state))
2	0
- Date: 16 January 2024
- Venue: Estádio Heriberto Hülse, Criciúma
- Referee: Gustavo Ervino Bauermann (FCF)
- Attendance: 10,037

The 2024 Recopa Catarinense was the sixth edition of a state football "super-cup" tournament organized by the Federação Catarinense de Futebol (FCF). It was played in a single match between Criciúma, winner of the 2023 Campeonato Catarinense and Marcílio Dias, winner of the 2023 Copa Santa Catarina.

The match, held on 16 January 2024, at the Estádio Heriberto Hülse, Criciúma emerged victorious with a score of 2-0 and won their first title of the tournament.

== Background ==
On 13 January 2018, Chapecoense, holder of the previous season's state title, faced in a friendly the winner of the Copa Santa Catarina, CA Tubarão. Later, on 14 September 2018, the FCF made the Recopa Catarinense official in the state calendar along the same lines. At the time, the entity planned to hold the tournament in January, but the 2019 Copa América made it impossible to hold the match in that month. Until the edition in question, Figueirense and Brusque have won two titles, while Avaí and Joinville have won the tournament once.

== Match ==
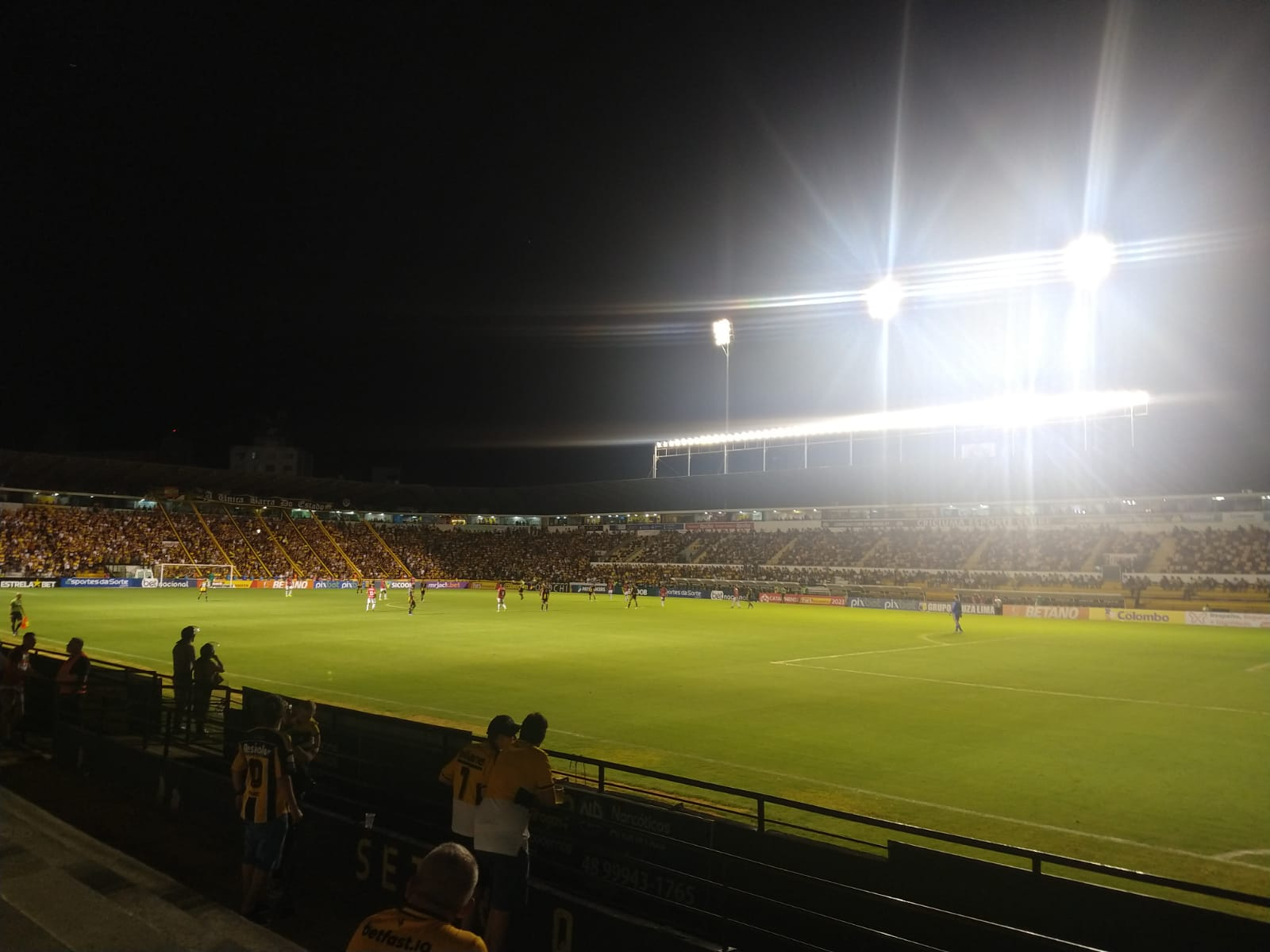
Estádio Heriberto Hülse, where the 2024 Recopa Catarinense was held.

The match took place at 9:30 pm on Tuesday, January 16, 2024, at the Estádio Heriberto Hülse, in Criciúma. The attendance was 10,037 people. The refereeing quartet was made up of Gustavo Ervino Bauermann, assisted by assistants Kléber Lúcio Gil and Fabiano Coelho da Silva. Luiz Augusto Silveira Tisne acted as fourth referee. For this edition, there were tributes to Zagallo, including the trophy, named Mário Jorge Lobo Zagallo. The transmission took place through SporTV and Premiere.

After piling up opportunities and forcing goalkeeper Belliato to work hard, Criciúma managed to score the first after a low cross from Eder to Felipe Vizeu, who finished practically with an empty net in the 31st minute. Eight minutes later, it was Eder's turn to appear free inside the small area to extend the score and make Tigre go to the dressing room more calmly. At half-time, the experienced striker revealed that he promised coach Cláudio Tencati that he would return to analyze his physical form and the possibility of playing in the Recopa Catarinense final. Criciúma came back from the locker room looking for the third and almost managed it after Fellipe Mateus took advantage of the opportunity from a corner kick, but Belliato, once again, appeared to save Marinheiro. On the other hand, Marcílio Dias tried to react after substitutions and ended up finishing with defender Silvio, but goalkeeper Gustavo appeared to make a good save. However, the Mario Jorge Lobo Zagallo trophy went to Criciúma, which guarantees the unprecedented Recopa Catarinense title.
