= Alisson (footballer, born 1995) =

Brazilian footballer

Personal information
- Full name: Alisson Machado dos Santos
- Date of birth: 8 June 1995 (age 31)
- Place of birth: Santiago, Brazil
- Height: 1.88 m (6 ft 2 in)
- Position: Goalkeeper

Team information
- Current team: Criciúma
- Number: 1

Youth career
- 2012–2014: Internacional
- 2015–2016: Figueirense

Senior career*
Years	Team	Apps	(Gls)
2016–2018	Figueirense	4	(0)
2019–2020	Paraná	45	(0)
2021–	Criciúma	52	(0)
2025	→ Paysandu (loan)	1	(0)
- * Club domestic league appearances and goals as of 15 April 2026

Alisson Machado dos Santos (born 8 June 1995), simply known as Alisson, is a Brazilian footballer who plays as a goalkeeper for Criciúma.

== Career ==
Born in Santiago, Rio Grande do Sul, Alisson represented Internacional and Figueirense as a youth. Promoted to the latter's first team in January 2016, he only made his senior debut on 25 November 2017, starting in a 1–0 Série B home win over Paysandu.

Rarely used by Figueira, Alisson joined Paraná on 8 February 2019. Initially a backup option in his first year, he became a regular starter in his second.

On 12 February 2021, Alisson was announced at Criciúma. A backup to Gustavo, he was a part of the squad which achieved two promotions in three seasons.

On 9 January 2025, Alisson joined Brazilian club Paysandu Sport Club

== Career statistics ==
As of 30 January 2024

Club	Season	League			State League		Cup		Continental		Other		Total	
Club	Season	Division	Apps	Goals	Apps	Goals	Apps	Goals	Apps	Goals	Apps	Goals	Apps	Goals
Figueirense	2016	Série A	0	0	0	0	0	0	—		—		0	0
Figueirense	2017	Série B	1	0	0	0	0	0	—		—		1	0
Figueirense	2018	Série B	1	0	2	0	0	0	—		—		3	0
Figueirense	Total		2	0	2	0	0	0	—		—		4	0
Paraná	2019	Série B	5	0	3	0	0	0	—		—		8	0
Paraná	2020	Série B	19	0	8	0	2	0	—		—		29	0
Paraná	Total		24	0	11	0	2	0	—		—		37	0
Criciúma	2021	Série C	1	0	3	0	1	0	—		4 (Note: Appearance(s) in Copa Santa Catarina)	0	9	0
Criciúma	2022	Série B	1	0	11	0	0	0	—		—		12	0
Criciúma	2023	Série B	5	0	2	0	0	0	—		—		7	0
Criciúma	2024	Série A	0	0	0	0	0	0	—		0	0	0	0
Criciúma	Total		7	0	16	0	1	0	—		4	0	28	0
Career total			33	0	29	0	3	0	0	0	4	0	69	0

== Honours ==
Figueirense

- Campeonato Catarinense: 2018

Criciúma

- Campeonato Catarinense Série B: 2022
- Campeonato Catarinense: 2023
- Recopa Catarinense: 2024

Paysandu

- Supercopa Grão-Pará: 2025
