= Fabinho (footballer, born 1999) =

Brazilian footballer

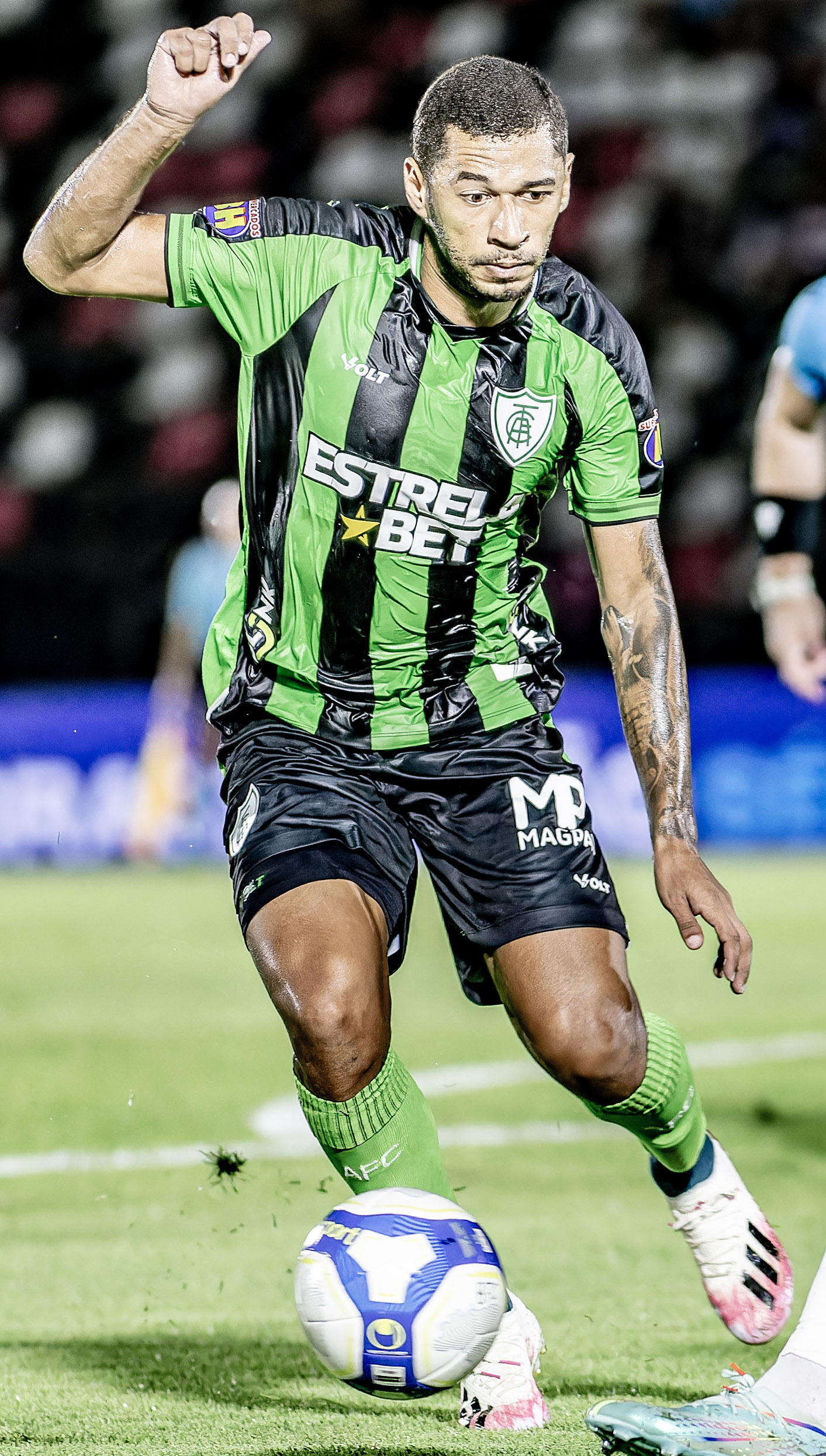

Personal information
- Full name: Fabio Augusto Luciano da Silva
- Date of birth: 18 November 1999 (age 26)
- Place of birth: São José dos Campos, Brazil
- Height: 1.80 m (5 ft 11 in)
- Position: Forward

Team information
- Current team: Coritiba
- Number: 28

Youth career
- 2014–2019: São Paulo

Senior career*
Years	Team	Apps	(Gls)
2017–2020	São Paulo	2	(0)
2020–2024	Athletico Paranaense	13	(1)
2021	→ Chapecoense (loan)	26	(2)
2021	→ Vitória (loan)	14	(2)
2022	→ Mirassol (loan)	13	(0)
2022	→ CRB (loan)	31	(8)
2023	→ Criciúma (loan)	42	(10)
2024–2025	América Mineiro	62	(14)
2026–	Coritiba	13	(1)
- * Club domestic league appearances and goals as of 7 April 2026

Fabio Augusto Luciano da Silva (born 18 November 1999), commonly known as Fabinho, is a Brazilian footballer who plays as a forward for Coritiba.

== Career ==
=== São Paulo ===
Fabinho made his league debut for São Paulo B against Desportivo Brasil on 30 August 2017.

Fabinho made his league debut for São Paulo against Internacional on 7 September 2019.

=== Athletico Paranaense ===
Fabinho made his league debut for Athletico Paranaense against Red Bull Bragantino on 3 September 2020. He scored his first goal for the club against Coritiba on 12 September 2020, scoring in the 12th minute.

=== Chapecoense ===
Fabinho scored on his debut for Chapecoense against Concórdia on 25 February 2021, scoring in the 86th minute.

=== Vitória ===
Fabinho made his league debut for Vitória against Goiás Esporte Clube on 2 October 2021.

=== Mirassol ===
Fabinho made his league debut for Mirassol against RB Bragantino on 27 January 2022. He scored his first goal for the club in the Copa do Brasil against Grêmio on 2 March 2022, scoring in the 53rd minute.

=== CRB ===
Fabinho made his league debut for CRB against CR Vasco da Gama on 16 April 2022. He scored his first goal for the club against Novorizontino on 5 May 2022, scoring in the 12th minute.

=== Criciúma ===
Fabinho made his league debut for Criciúma against Joinville on 12 February 2023. He scored his first goals for the club against Camboriú on 15 February 2023, scoring a hattrick.

=== América Mineiro ===
Fabinho made his league debut for América Mineiro against Pouso Alegre on 25 January 2024. He scored his first goal for the club against Ipatinga on 28 January 2024, scoring in the 72nd minute.

== Career statistics ==
=== Club ===
As of 30 March 2021.

Club	Season	League			State league		Cup		Continental		Other		Total	
Club	Season	Division	Apps	Goals	Apps	Goals	Apps	Goals	Apps	Goals	Apps	Goals	Apps	Goals
São Paulo	2017	Série A	0	0	—		0	0	—		3 (Note: Appearance(s) in Copa Paulista)	0	3	0
São Paulo	2019	Série A	1	0	0	0	0	0	—		—		1	0
São Paulo	2020	Série A	0	0	1	0	0	0	—		—		1	0
São Paulo	Total		1	0	1	0	0	0	—		3	0	5	0
Athletico Paranaense	2020	Série A	13	1	—		2	0	5 (Note: Appearance(s) in Copa Libertadores)	0	—		20	1
Chapecoense (loan)	2021	Série A	0	0	4	1	0	0	—		—		4	1
Career total			14	1	5	1	2	0	5	0	3	0	29	2

== Honours ==
São Paulo (youth)

- Copa São Paulo de Futebol Jr.: 2019
- Copa do Brasil Sub-20: 2018
- Supercopa do Brasil Sub-20: 2018
- Copa RS Sub-20: 2017
- Taça Belo Horizonte de Juniores: 2017
- U-18 Aspire Tri-Series: 2017
- Future Cup: 2017
- Copa Ouro Sub-17: 2017
- Campeonato Paulista Sub-17: 2015, 2016
- Campeonato Paulista Sub-15: 2014
- Copa Votorantim Sub-15: 2014

Criciúma

- Campeonato Catarinense: 2023

== Personal life ==
Fabinho is brother of the also footballer Luiz Phellype.
