= Ianson =

Brazilian footballer

Personal information
- Full name: Ianson Acosta Soares
- Date of birth: 15 July 1995 (age 31)
- Place of birth: Caxias do Sul, Brazil
- Height: 1.87 m (6 ft 2 in)
- Position: Centre-back

Team information
- Current team: Caxias

Youth career
- –2012: Caxias

Senior career*
Years	Team	Apps	(Gls)
2013	Caxias		
2014	Clermont Foot		
2014	→ Cournon (loan)		
2014	→ Criciúma (loan)	4	(0)
2015–2018	Criciúma	28	(1)
2016	→ Brusque (loan)	2	(0)
2018–2025	Brusque	214	(7)
2025	Tombense	16	(0)
2026	Santa Cruz	6	(1)
2026–	Caxias	18	(0)
- * Club domestic league appearances and goals as of 10 November 2026

Ianson Acosta Soares (born 15 July 1995), simply known as Ianson, is a Brazilian professional footballer who plays as a centre-back for Caxias.

== Career ==
Born in Caxias do Sul, Ianson began his career at SER Caxias. In 2014, he was signed by Clermont Foot, but did not establish himself in French football. He was loaned to Criciúma at the end of 2014, and acquired definitively in 2015. He played for the team until 2018, being loaned in 2016 for the Série D dispute with Brusque FC. He permanently transferred to the club in 2018 where he remains to this day, having made 168 appearances until the 2023 season. In March 2025, Ianson ended his time at Brusque after 214 matches and 7 goals to transfer to Tombense FC. For the 2026 season, Ianson signed with Santa Cruz.

== Honours ==
Brusque

- Campeonato Brasileiro Série D: 2019
- Copa Santa Catarina: 2018, 2019
- Campeonato Catarinense: 2022
- Recopa Catarinense: 2020, 2023
