= Éverton Alemão =

Brazilian footballer (born 1993)

Personal information
- Full name: Éverton Paulo Strieder
- Date of birth: 1 June 1993 (age 33)
- Place of birth: Cerro Largo, Brazil
- Height: 1.85 m (6 ft 1 in)
- Position: Centre-back

Team information
- Current team: Barra-SC

Youth career
- –2013: Caxias

Senior career*
Years	Team	Apps	(Gls)
2013	Caxias		
2014–2019	São José-RS	65	(6)
2014	→ Santo Ângelo (loan)		
2015	→ Juventus-SC (loan)		
2018	→ Guarani (loan)	11	(0)
2019–2022	Brusque	121	(5)
2023	Mirassol	0	(0)
2023–2025	Brusque	98	(4)
2026–	Barra-SC	28	(4)
- * Club domestic league appearances and goals as of 11 November 2026

Éverton Paulo Strieder (born 1 June 1993), better known as Éverton Alemão, is a Brazilian professional footballer who plays as a centre-back for Barra-SC.

== Career ==
Éverton started his career at SER Caxias, but ended up being traded to São José in 2014. In 2017 he was part of the Copa Paulo Sant'Ana champion squad. In 2018, he was loaned to Guarani.

In 2019 Everton Alemão arrived at Brusque, where he remained until 2022, making 121 appearances. He returned to Brusque for a second spell after competing in the 2023 Campeonato Paulista with Mirassol.

== Honours ==
São José

- Copa FGF: 2017

Brusque

- Campeonato Catarinense: 2022
- Copa Santa Catarina: 2019
- Recopa Catarinense: 2020
