= Diego Mathias =

Brazilian footballer (born 1999)

Personal information
- Full name: Diego Mathias de Almeida
- Date of birth: 12 June 1999 (age 27)
- Place of birth: Rio de Janeiro, Brazil
- Height: 1.82 m (6 ft 0 in)
- Positions: Attacking midfielder; forward

Team information
- Current team: Novorizontino (on loan from Noroeste)

Youth career
- 2011–2013: Artsul
- 2014: Ituano
- 2015–2018: Artsul
- 2017: → Fluminense (loan)
- 2018: Joinville

Senior career*
Years	Team	Apps	(Gls)
2018–2021	Joinville	55	(9)
2021–2025	Brusque	129	(15)
2022	→ Caxias (loan)	17	(0)
2024	→ São Bento (loan)	13	(5)
2026–	Noroeste	7	(1)
2026–	→ Novorizontino (loan)	4	(0)
- * Club domestic league appearances and goals as of 17 November 2026

Diego Mathias de Almeida (born 12 June 1999), simply known as Diego Mathias, is a Brazilian professional footballer who plays as a forward for Novorizontino, on loan from Noroeste.

== Career ==
A striker notable for his great mobility, Mathias was trained by the youth sectors of Artsul, with spells at Ituano and Fluminense. As a professional, he stood out as an athlete for Joinville, where he won the 2020 Copa Santa Catarina and the 2021 Recopa Catarinense. He transferred to Brusque in 2021 and was state champion with the club in 2023. He also had loan spells at SER Caxias in 2022 and EC São Bento in 2024.

== Honours ==
Joinville

- Copa Santa Catarina: 2020
- Recopa Catarinense: 2021

Brusque

- Campeonato Catarinense: 2022
- Recopa Catarinense: 2023
