= Juninho (footballer, born 2001) =

Brazilian footballer

Personal information
- Full name: Alexandre de Almeida Silva Júnior
- Date of birth: 23 January 2001 (age 25)
- Place of birth: Nova Iguaçu, Brazil
- Height: 1.74 m (5 ft 9 in)
- Position: Centre midfielder

Team information
- Current team: Novorizontino
- Number: 50

Youth career
- –2020: Vasco da Gama

Senior career*
| Years | Team | Apps | (Gls) |
| 2020–2023 | Vasco da Gama | 75 | (1) |
| 2023 | → Orlando City B (loan) | 17 | (4) |
| 2023 | → Orlando City SC (loan) | 1 | (0) |
| 2024 | Goiás | 41 | (5) |
| 2025 | Criciúma | 27 | (4) |
| 2026– | Novorizontino | 48 | (8) |
- * Club domestic league appearances and goals as of 17 November 2026

Alexandre de Almeida Silva Júnior (born 23 January 2001), commonly known as Juninho, is a Brazilian footballer who plays as a centre midfielder for Novorizontino.

== Career ==
In March 2023, Juninho signed for MLS Next Pro club Orlando City B on loan for the 2023 season with the option to make the transfer permanent.

== Career statistics ==
=== Club ===
As of 7 June 2020.

Vasco da Gama

Titulo Copa do Brasil sub-20

| Club | Season | League | | | State league | | Cup | | Continental | | Other | | Total | |
| Club | Season | Division | Apps | Goals | Apps | Goals | Apps | Goals | Apps | Goals | Apps | Goals | Apps | Goals |
|---|---|---|---|---|---|---|---|---|---|---|---|---|---|---|
| Vasco da Gama | 2020 | Série A | 0 | 0 | 7 (Note: Appearances in the Campeonato Carioca) | 0 | 3 (Note: Appearances in the Copa do Brasil) | 0 | 1 (Note: Appearances in the Copa Sudamericana) | 0 | 0 | 0 | 11 | 0 |
| Career total | | | 0 | 0 | 7 | 0 | 3 | 0 | 1 | 0 | 0 | 0 | 11 | 0 |
