= Rodolfo Potiguar =

Brazilian footballer

Personal information
- Full name: Gerson Rodolfo da Silva
- Date of birth: 24 January 1988 (age 38)
- Place of birth: Caicó, Brazil
- Height: 1.79 m (5 ft 10 in)
- Position: Defensive midfielder

Team information
- Current team: Marcílio Dias

Youth career
- –2007: Porto-PE

Senior career*
Years	Team	Apps	(Gls)
2007–2012	Porto-PE		
2009	→ Central (loan)		
2010	→ Salgueiro (loan)		
2011	→ Náutico (loan)		
2011	→ Guarany de Sobral (loan)		
2012–2017	Salgueiro		
2013	→ Picos (loan)		
2017–2019	Fluminense de Feira		
2018–2019	→ Juazeirense (loan)		
2019–2025	Brusque		
2025–	Marcílio Dias		
- * Club domestic league appearances and goals as of 19 October 2025

Gerson Rodolfo da Silva (born 24 January 1988), better known as Rodolfo Potiguar, is a Brazilian professional footballer who plays as a defensive midfielder for Marcílio Dias.

== Career ==
Born in the state of Rio Grande do Norte, Rodolfo started playing and developed most of his career in football in Pernambuco, playing for Porto, Central Salgueiro and Náutico. He also had spells at Guarany de Sobral, Picos, Juazeirense and Fluminense de Feira.

On 2019 he was acquired by Brusque FC, his first club outside the northeast, and where he won titles for the first time. In May 2025, Potiguar transferred to Marcílio Dias.

== Honours ==
Brusque

- Campeonato Catarinense: 2022
- Copa Santa Catarina: 2019
- Recopa Catarinense: 2020, 2023
