= Iran (footballer, born 1995) =

Brazilian footballer

Personal information
- Full name: Iran Sidny Freitas de Almeida
- Date of birth: 29 November 1995 (age 30)
- Place of birth: Riachão do Jacuípe, Brazil
- Height: 1.84 m (6 ft 0 in)
- Position: Centre-back

Team information
- Current team: Maranhão
- Number: 4

Senior career*
| Years | Team | Apps | (Gls) |
| 2014–2015 | Amadense | 0 | (0) |
| 2017 | Flamengo de Guanambi | 3 | (0) |
| 2017 | Colo Colo | 4 | (0) |
| 2018 | PFC Cajazeiras | 12 | (0) |
| 2019 | Atlético Alagoinhas | 11 | (0) |
| 2019 | Real Noroeste | 0 | (0) |
| 2020 | Jacobina | 7 | (0) |
| 2020 | River | 0 | (0) |
| 2020–2022 | Atlético Alagoinhas | 50 | (1) |
| 2021 | → Maranhão (loan) | 7 | (0) |
| 2021 | → Atlético Paraense (loan) | 2 | (0) |
| 2022 | Volta Redonda | 33 | (3) |
| 2023–2024 | Brusque | 17 | (0) |
| 2024 | → Náutico (loan) | 13 | (0) |
| 2025 | Portuguesa-RJ | 5 | (0) |
| 2025 | América de Natal | 3 | (0) |
| 2025 | → Barra-SC (loan) | 4 | (0) |
| 2026 | São José-SP | 9 | (0) |
| 2026– | Maranhão | 0 | (0) |
- * Club domestic league appearances and goals as of 10 November 2026

Iran Sidny Freitas de Almeida (born 29 November 1995), known as Iran Sidny or just Iran, is a Brazilian footballer who plays as a centre-back for Maranhão.

== Career ==
Born in Riachão do Jacuípe, Bahia, Iran began his career with Amadense in 2014, and subsequently played for amateur teams in the cities of Valença and of his hometown. He then played in the 2017 Campeonato Baiano for Flamengo de Guanambi, before moving to second division side Colo Colo.

In December 2018, after being a starter for PFC Cajazeiras, Iran signed for Atlético Alagoinhas. He finished the 2019 season at Real Noroeste, and played for Jacobina and River before returning to Atlético Alagoinhas on 25 August 2020.

In 2021, Iran served loans at Maranhão and Atlético Paraense. On 13 April 2022, he agreed to a contract with Volta Redonda until the end of the year.

On 23 November 2022, Iran moved to Brusque on a one-year deal. On 16 May 2024, he was announced at Náutico on loan until the end of the season.

On 12 December 2024, Iran moved to Portuguesa-RJ. He joined América de Natal the following 3 February, before being loaned out to Barra-SC on 12 June 2025.

On 9 December 2025, São José-SP announced the signing of Iran.

== Career statistics ==
As of 29 April 2026

| Club | Season | League | | | State League | | Cup | | Continental | | Other | | Total | |
| Club | Season | Division | Apps | Goals | Apps | Goals | Apps | Goals | Apps | Goals | Apps | Goals | Apps | Goals |
|---|---|---|---|---|---|---|---|---|---|---|---|---|---|---|
| Flamengo de Guanambi | 2017 | Baiano | — | | 3 | 0 | — | | — | | — | | 3 | 0 |
| Colo Colo | 2017 | Baiano 2ª Divisão | — | | 4 | 0 | — | | — | | — | | 4 | 0 |
| PFC Cajazeiras | 2018 | Baiano 2ª Divisão | — | | 12 | 0 | — | | — | | — | | 12 | 0 |
| Atlético Alagoinhas | 2019 | Baiano | — | | 11 | 0 | — | | — | | — | | 11 | 0 |
| Real Noroeste | 2019 | Capixaba | — | | — | | — | | — | | 6 (Note: One appearance in Copa Verde, five appearances in Copa Espírito Santo) | 0 | 6 | 0 |
| Jacobina | 2020 | Baiano | — | | 7 | 0 | — | | — | | — | | 7 | 0 |
| River | 2020 | Série D | — | | — | | — | | — | | 1 (Note: Appearance(s) in Copa do Nordeste) | 0 | 1 | 0 |
| Atlético Alagoinha | 2020 | Série D | 15 | 0 | — | | — | | — | | 2 | 0 | 17 | 0 |
| Atlético Alagoinha | 2021 | Série D | 12 | 0 | 12 | 1 | 1 | 0 | — | | — | | 25 | 1 |
| Atlético Alagoinha | 2022 | Série D | — | | 11 | 0 | 1 | 0 | — | | 7 | 1 | 19 | 1 |
| Atlético Alagoinha | Total | | 27 | 0 | 23 | 1 | 2 | 0 | — | | 9 | 1 | 61 | 2 |
| Maranhão (loan) | 2021 | Maranhense Série B | — | | 7 | 0 | — | | — | | — | | 7 | 0 |
| Atlético Paraense (loan) | 2021 | Paraense Série A2 | — | | 2 | 0 | — | | — | | — | | 2 | 0 |
| Volta Redonda | 2022 | Série C | 21 | 2 | 12 | 1 | — | | — | | 5 (Note: Appearance(s) in Copa Rio) | 1 | 38 | 4 |
| Brusque | 2023 | Série C | 10 | 0 | 6 | 0 | 1 | 0 | — | | 0 | 0 | 17 | 0 |
| Brusque | 2024 | Série B | 0 | 0 | 1 | 0 | 0 | 0 | — | | — | | 1 | 0 |
| Brusque | Total | | 10 | 0 | 7 | 0 | 1 | 0 | — | | 0 | 0 | 18 | 0 |
| Náutico (loan) | 2024 | Série C | 13 | 0 | — | | — | | — | | — | | 13 | 0 |
| Portuguesa-RJ | 2025 | Carioca | — | | 5 | 0 | — | | — | | — | | 5 | 0 |
| América de Natal | 2025 | Série D | — | | 3 | 0 | — | | — | | 4 | 0 | 7 | 0 |
| Barra-SC (loan) | 2025 | Série D | 4 | 0 | — | | — | | — | | — | | 4 | 0 |
| São José-SP | 2026 | Paulista A2 | — | | 9 | 0 | — | | — | | — | | 9 | 0 |
| Career total | | | 75 | 2 | 105 | 2 | 3 | 0 | 0 | 0 | 25 | 2 | 208 | 6 |

== Honours ==
Real Noroeste

- Copa Espírito Santo: 2019

Atlético Alagoinhas

- Campeonato Baiano: 2021, 2022

Volta Redonda

- Campeonato Carioca Série A2: 2022
- Copa Rio: 2022

Brusque

- Recopa Catarinense: 2023

América de Natal

- Campeonato Potiguar: 2025

Barra-SC

- Campeonato Brasileiro Série D: 2025
