= Juninho Tardelli =

Brazilian footballer

Personal information
- Full name: José Tadeu Martins Júnior
- Date of birth: August 23, 1983 (age 43)
- Place of birth: São Paulo, Brazil
- Height: 1.72 m (5 ft 7 1/2 in)
- Position: Midfielder

Team information
- Current team: Marcílio Dias-SC
- Number: 10

Senior career*
Years	Team	Apps	(Gls)
2006	Marcílio Dias		
2007	Primavera		
2007	Caxias		
2008	São Bernardo		
2009	Atlético Mineiro	0	(0)
2009	Tigres do Brasil	4	(1)
2010	Juventus Jaraguá		
2011	Porto Alegre		
2011	Cruzeiro		
2011	Camboriú		
2012–2013	Lajeadense	10	(0)
2013–2014	Mes Kerman	9	(0)
2014–	Ypiranga-RS		
- * Club domestic league appearances and goals as of 08:28, 17 June 2014 (UTC)

José Tadeu Martins Júnior (born 23 August 1983), simply known as Juninho Tardelli is a Brazilian footballer playing for Marcílio Dias as a midfielder.
