= Dentinho (footballer, born 1997) =

Brazilian footballer

Personal information
- Full name: Lucas Baptista Félix
- Date of birth: 7 May 1997 (age 29)
- Place of birth: Cachoeiro de Itapemirim, Brazil
- Height: 1.83 m (6 ft 0 in)
- Position: Forward

Team information
- Current team: Caxias

Senior career*
Years	Team	Apps	(Gls)
2018–2019	Tigres do Brasil	11	(0)
2020	Estrela do Norte	10	(1)
2021	Sousa	22	(4)
2021–2022	Hercílio Luz	12	(3)
2022–2023	Avaí	32	(2)
2022	→ Vila Nova (loan)	13	(1)
2023–2024	Brusque	48	(3)
2025	Chapecoense	24	(1)
2025–2026	Guarani	13	(1)
2026–	Caxias	5	(1)
- * Club domestic league appearances and goals as of 10 November 2026

Lucas Baptista Félix (born 7 May 1997), commonly known as Dentinho, is a Brazilian footballer who plays as a forward for Caxias.

== Club career ==
Born in Cachoeiro de Itapemirim, Espírito Santo, Dentinho began his career with Tigres do Brasil in 2018. In September 2020 season, he moved to hometown side Estrela do Norte.

On 27 January 2021, Dentinho was announced as the new signing of Sousa. A regular starter, he signed for Hercílio Luz in September, for the year's Copa Santa Catarina.

On 6 April 2022, Dentinho agreed to a contract with Série A side Avaí until December 2023. He made his debut in the category four days later, coming on as a late substitute for Jonathan Copete in a 1–0 home win over América Mineiro.

== Career statistics ==
As of 7 February 2023

Club	Season	League			State League		Cup		Continental		Other		Total	
Club	Season	Division	Apps	Goals	Apps	Goals	Apps	Goals	Apps	Goals	Apps	Goals	Apps	Goals
Tigres do Brasil	2018	Carioca Série B1	—		3	0	—		—		—		3	0
Tigres do Brasil	2019	Carioca Série B1	—		8	0	—		—		5 (Note: Appearance(s) in Copa Rio)	1	13	1
Tigres do Brasil	Total		—		11	0	—		—		5	1	16	1
Estrela do Norte	2020	Capixaba	—		10	1	—		—		—		10	1
Sousa	2021	Série D	12	2	10	2	—		—		—		22	4
Hercílio Luz	2021	Catarinense	—		0	0	—		—		8 (Note: Appearance(s) in Copa Santa Catarina)	0	8	0
Hercílio Luz	2022	Catarinense	—		12	3	—		—		—		12	3
Hercílio Luz	Total		—		12	3	—		—		8	0	20	3
Avaí	2022	Série A	10	0	—		—		—		—		10	0
Avaí	2023	Série B	0	0	2	0	0	0	—		—		2	0
Avaí	Total		10	0	2	0	0	0	—		—		12	0
Vila Nova (loan)	2022	Série B	13	1	—		—		—		—		13	1
Career total			35	3	45	6	0	0	0	0	13	1	93	10
