= Eduardo (footballer, born 1997) =

Brazilian footballer

Personal information
- Full name: Eduardo Jacinto de Biasi
- Date of birth: 9 January 1997 (age 29)
- Place of birth: Treze de Maio, Brazil
- Height: 1.78 m (5 ft 10 in)
- Position: Defensive midfielder

Team information
- Current team: Criciúma
- Number: 5

Youth career
- 2014–2017: Criciúma
- 2017: → Cruzeiro (loan)

Senior career*
Years	Team	Apps	(Gls)
2015–2021	Criciúma	132	(4)
2022–2023	Avaí	71	(3)
2024	Chapecoense	5	(0)
2024	Novorizontino	30	(0)
2025	FC Anyang	18	(0)
2026–	Criciúma	13	(0)
- * Club domestic league appearances and goals as of 15 April 2026

Eduardo Jacinto de Biasi (born 9 January 1997), simply known as Eduardo, is a Brazilian footballer who plays as a defensive midfielder for Criciúma.

== Club career ==
Born in Três de Maio, Santa Catarina, Eduardo joined Criciúma's youth setup in 2014, after a recommendation from his brother, who was already in the club's first team. He made his senior debut on 12 April 2015, coming on as a late substitute in a 1–0 Campeonato Catarinense home win over Metropolitano.

Mainly used in the under-20 squad afterwards, Eduardo moved to Cruzeiro on a one-year loan deal. However, he only featured for the under-20s, and returned to Criciúma for the 2018 campaign, where he became a starter.

On 13 January 2022, Eduardo signed a two-year contract with Avaí, newly promoted to the Série A.

== Personal life ==
Eduardo's older brother Ezequiel is also a footballer. A right back, he too was groomed at Criciúma.

== Career statistics ==
As of match played 28 September 2025

Appearances and goals by club, season and competition
Club	Season	League			State League		Cup		Continental		Other		Total	
Club	Season	Division	Apps	Goals	Apps	Goals	Apps	Goals	Apps	Goals	Apps	Goals	Apps	Goals
Criciúma	2015	Série B	0	0	7	0	0	0	—		1 (Note: Appearance(s) in Recopa Catarinense)	0	8	0
Criciúma	2016	Série B	0	0	0	0	0	0	—		1 (Note: Appearance(s) in Primeira Liga)	0	1	0
Criciúma	2017	Série B	0	0	0	0	0	0	—		2	0	2	0
Criciúma	2018	Série B	25	3	2	0	0	0	—		—		27	3
Criciúma	2019	Série B	30	0	16	0	2	0	—		—		48	0
Criciúma	2020	Série C	16	0	10	0	1	0	—		—		27	0
Criciúma	2021	Série C	21	0	11	1	6	1	—		2 (Note: Appearance(s) in Copa Santa Catarina)	0	40	2
Criciúma	Total		92	3	39	1	9	1	—		5	0	145	5
Avaí	2022	Série A	31	1	11	0	1	0	—		1	0	44	1
Avaí	2023	Série B	19	2	10	0	—		—		—		29	2
Avaí	Total		50	3	21	0	1	0	—		1	0	73	3
Chapecoense	2024	Série B	—		5	0	—		—		—		5	0
Novorizontino	2024	Série B	30	0	—		—		—		—		30	0
FC Anyang	2025	K League 1	18	0	—		2	0	—		—		20	0
Career total			190	6	65	1	12	1	0	0	6	0	273	8
