= Rodrigo (footballer, born 1987) =

Brazilian footballer

Personal information
- Full name: Rodrigo Fagundes de Freitas
- Date of birth: 10 March 1987 (age 39)
- Place of birth: Coxim, Brazil
- Height: 1.87 m (6 ft 2 in)
- Position: Defender

Team information
- Current team: Criciúma
- Number: 3

Senior career*
Years	Team	Apps	(Gls)
2007–2009	CENE		
2008	→ Roma Apucarana (loan)		
2009	MS/Saad		
2010	Cascavel CR		
2010	Comercial		
2010	Marcílio Dias	6	(0)
2011	Cascavel CR	11	(0)
2011	Comercial		
2011–2012	Toledo	17	(1)
2012–2013	CENE	6	(2)
2013–2015	XV de Piracicaba	17	(3)
2015–2016	Paraná	4	(1)
2016–2017	XV de Piracicaba	47	(8)
2017	Boa Esporte	0	(0)
2018	Veranópolis	5	(0)
2018	Brusque	0	(0)
2018–2019	Operário Ferroviário	32	(1)
2020	Santo André	14	(1)
2020	Brasiliense	10	(0)
2020	Botafogo-PB	9	(2)
2021	Santo André	13	(0)
2021–	Criciúma	218	(16)
- * Club domestic league appearances and goals as of 15 April 2026

Rodrigo Fagundes Freitas (born 10 Match 1987), known as Rodrigo Fagundes or simply Rodrigo is a Brazilian footballer who currently plays as a defender for Criciúma.

== Career statistics ==
=== Club ===
As of 29 July 2020.

Club	Season	League			State League		Cup		Continental		Other		Total	
Club	Season	Division	Apps	Goals	Apps	Goals	Apps	Goals	Apps	Goals	Apps	Goals	Apps	Goals
Marcílio Dias	2010	Série D	6	0	–		–		–		–		6	0
Cascavel CR	2011	Paranaense	–		11	0	–		–		–		11	0
Toledo	2012	Paranaense	–		17	1	–		–		–		17	1
CENE	2012	Série D	6	2	–		–		–		–		6	2
XV de Piracicaba	2013	Paulista	–		–		–		–		21 (Note: Appearances in the Copa Paulista)	1	21	1
XV de Piracicaba	2014	Paulista	–		9	2	–		–		19	0	28	2
XV de Piracicaba	2015	Paulista	–		8	1	–		–		–		8	1
XV de Piracicaba	Total		–		17	3	–		–		40	1	57	4
Paraná	2015	Série B	4	1	–		–		–		–		4	1
XV de Piracicaba	2016	Paulista	–		–		–		–		16	1	16	1
XV de Piracicaba	2017	Série D	6	1	16	5	–		–		11	1	33	7
XV de Piracicaba	Total		6	1	16	5	–		–		27	2	49	8
Veranópolis	2018	Gaúcho	–		6	0	–		–		–		6	0
Operário Ferroviário	2018	Série C	5	0	–		–		–		–		5	0
Operário Ferroviário	2019	Série B	25	1	2	0	–		–		–		27	1
Operário Ferroviário	Total		30	1	2	0	–		–		–		32	1
Santo André	2020	Paulista	–		11	1	2	0	–		–		13	1
Career total			52	5	80	10	2	0	0	0	67	3	201	18

Notes

Títulos

Criciúma Esporte Clube

Campeonato Catarinense Série B 2022

Campeonato Catarinense A 2023,2024

Recopa Catarinense 2024, 2025
