= Danilo Belão =

Brazilian footballer

Personal information
- Full name: Danilo José Belão
- Date of birth: 5 April 1997 (age 29)
- Place of birth: Pirangi, Brazil
- Height: 1.78 m (5 ft 10 in)
- Position: Right-back

Team information
- Current team: Betim

Youth career
- 2011–2018: São Paulo

Senior career*
Years	Team	Apps	(Gls)
2017–2019	São Paulo	6	(1)
2018	→ Itumbiara (loan)		
2019	→ Votuporanguense (loan)		
2020	Votuporanguense		
2020	Democrata-GV		
2021–2023	Inter de Lages		
2021	→ Caldense (loan)		
2021	→ Vila Nova (loan)		
2022	→ Villa Nova (loan)		
2022	→ Betim (loan)		
2022	→ Tombense (loan)		
2023	→ Brusque (loan)		
2024	Náutico		
2025	Joinville		
2026–	Betim		
- * Club domestic league appearances and goals as of 8 March 2026

Danilo José Belão (born 5 April 1997) is a Brazilian professional footballer who plays as a right-back.

== Career ==
Danilo started in the youth sectors of São Paulo, where he won important titles such as the Campeonato Brasileiro de Aspirantes and the Copa do Brasil U20. He played for Itumbiara and Votuporanguense until he was hired by Inter de Lages, the club that holds his pass. He was loaned to several clubs, highlighting in 2023 at Brusque, where he currently plays.

On 4 December 2023, his permanent hiring by was announced by Náutico. In November 2024, he signed with Joinville EC. For the 2026 season, Belão signed with Betim.

== Honours ==
São Paulo

- Campeonato Brasileiro Sub-23: 2018
- Copa do Brasil Sub-20: 2018

Brusque

- Recopa Catarinense: 2023
