= Rayan (footballer, born 1989) =

Brazilian footballer

Personal information
- Full name: Rayan Poltronieri Pereira
- Date of birth: 21 December 1989 (age 36)
- Place of birth: Linhares, Brazil
- Height: 1.85 m (6 ft 1 in)
- Position: Centre-back

Team information
- Current team: Criciúma

Youth career
- 2007: São Caetano

Senior career*
Years	Team	Apps	(Gls)
2008–2009	São Caetano	0	(0)
2008	→ Mirassol (loan)	0	(0)
2008	→ Batatais (loan)	0	(0)
2009	→ Red Bull Brasil (loan)	0	(0)
2009	→ Mirassol (loan)	0	(0)
2009	→ Batatais (loan)	0	(0)
2010–2011	Campinense	0	(0)
2010	→ Red Bull Brasil (loan)	0	(0)
2011–2012	Icasa	2	(0)
2012	Rio Claro	0	(0)
2013	São José	0	(0)
2013–2015	Santo André	10	(1)
2015–2016	São Bernardo	4	(0)
2016	→ ASA (loan)	17	(0)
2017–2018	Paraná	61	(1)
2019–2020	Ferroviária	18	(1)
2019	→ Bragantino (loan)	14	(1)
2020	→ Ponte Preta (loan)	7	(0)
2021	Ponte Preta	18	(0)
2022	Mirassol	7	(0)
2022–	Criciúma	43	(2)
- * Club domestic league appearances and goals as of 20:21, 22 December 2022 (UTC)

Rayan Poltronieri Pereira, commonly known as Rayan, is a Brazilian footballer who plays as a centre-back for Criciúma.

== Career ==
He made his national league debut for Icasa in 2011 Campeonato Brasileiro Série B, against Duque de Caxias on 20 July 2011. He has also represented Paraná in 2018 Campeonato Brasileiro Série A and 2017 Campeonato Brasileiro Série B, ASA in 2016 Campeonato Brasileiro Série C and Santo André in 2013 Campeonato Brasileiro Série D.
