= Marcelo Hermes =

Brazilian footballer

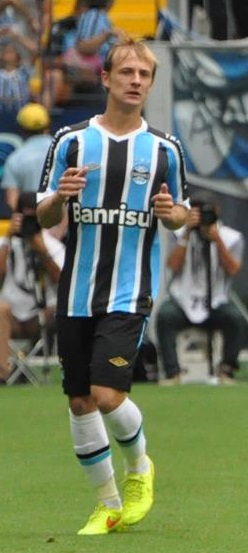
- Hermes in January 2015

Personal information
- Date of birth: 1 February 1995 (age 31)
- Place of birth: Sarandi, Brazil
- Height: 1.77 m (5 ft 10 in)
- Position: Left back

Team information
- Current team: Criciúma
- Number: 22

Youth career
- 2006–2008: Vila Nova
- 2008: Mundo Verde
- 2008–2009: Figueirense
- 2009: Internacional
- 2009–2014: Grêmio

Senior career*
Years	Team	Apps	(Gls)
2015–2017	Grêmio	34	(2)
2017	Benfica B	5	(0)
2017–2019	Benfica	1	(0)
2018	→ Cruzeiro (loan)	15	(1)
2019–2020	Cruzeiro	0	(0)
2019	→ Goiás (loan)	26	(0)
2020	Marítimo	30	(1)
2021	Ponte Preta	7	(0)
2022–	Criciúma	175	(13)
2025	→ Juventude (loan)	22	(2)
- * Club domestic league appearances and goals as of 15 April 2026

Marcelo Hermes (born 1 February 1995) is a Brazilian professional footballer who plays as a left back for Criciúma.

== Career ==
=== Early career ===
Born in Sarandi, Rio Grande do Sul, Hermes started his career at a football academy in Nova Boa Vista. Shortly after, he played futsal at SERCESA of Carazinho with whom he won a state title. In 2008, Hermes joined Figueirense where he stayed one season. In 2009, he had a very quick visit to Porto Alegre side Internacional, before joining city rivals Grêmio. There he played in youth ranks until 2014.

=== Grêmio ===
At the end of 2014, Hermes was brought to Grêmio's first-team by Luiz Felipe Scolari. However, Hermes did not play any match and was only on the bench against Flamengo in Série A. It was only in 2015, after being registered in Campeonato Gaúcho, that he got his first opportunity to play. On 31 January, Hermes debuted professionally in a 3–0 home win over União Frederiquense in the league's first round.

=== Benfica ===
On 4 January 2017, Hermes signed for Portuguese champions Benfica until 2021.

=== Cruzeiro ===
In January 2019, after on year on loan with Cruzeiro from Benfica, he signed a two-year contract with Cruzeiro and joined Goiás on one year loan.

=== Marítimo ===
In August 2020, Hermes signed a two-year contract with Marítimo.

== Honours ==
Benfica

- Primeira Liga: 2016–17

Cruzeiro

- Campeonato Mineiro: 2018
- Copa do Brasil: 2018

Criciúma

- Campeonato Catarinense: 2023
- Recopa Catarinense: 2024
