= Keké (footballer) =

Brazilian footballer

Personal information
- Full name: Paulo de Souza Júnior
- Date of birth: 11 October 1995 (age 31)
- Place of birth: Marília, Brazil
- Height: 1.77 m (5 ft 10 in)
- Position: Left winger

Team information
- Current team: Joinville

Youth career
- 2014: Flamengo-SP
- 2015: Mogi Mirim

Senior career*
Years	Team	Apps	(Gls)
2015–2016	Mogi Mirim	29	(3)
2017	Veranópolis	11	(3)
2017–2025	Tombense	106	(15)
2018–2019	→ Vila Nova (loan)	29	(3)
2020	→ Ituano (loan)	3	(0)
2020	→ Figueirense (loan)	16	(3)
2021	→ Cruzeiro (loan)	3	(0)
2024	→ Água Santa (loan)	13	(1)
2024	→ Brusque (loan)	12	(2)
2025–	Joinville	17	(3)
- * Club domestic league appearances and goals as of 6 November 2025

Paulo de Souza Júnior (born 11 October 1995), better known by the nickname Keké, is a Brazilian professional footballer who plays as a left winger for Joinville.

== Career ==
Revealed by Flamengo de Guarulhos, Keké played professionally for Mogi Mirim and Veranópolis before arriving at Tombense, a club that has held its federative rights since 2019. For the club, he was champion of the 2020 Recopa Mineira, in addition to making more than 100 appearances.

He was loaned to other teams, namely Vila Nova, Ituano, Figueirense. In 2021 he played on loan for Cruzeiro, but due to a foot injury, he only played three matches. At the beginning of 2024, he played in the Campeonato Paulista for EC Água Santa, and on 15 April 2024, he was loaned once more time to Brusque FC. For the 2025 season, Keké signed a permanent contract with Joinville.

== Honours ==
Tombense

- Recopa Mineira: 2020
