= Waguininho =

Brazilian footballer

Personal information
- Full name: Wagner da Silva Souza
- Date of birth: 30 January 1990 (age 36)
- Place of birth: Cubatão, Brazil
- Height: 1.78 m (5 ft 10 in)
- Position: Forward

Team information
- Current team: Criciúma
- Number: 13

Youth career
- São Vicente

Senior career*
Years	Team	Apps	(Gls)
2010–2012	São Vicente	53	(23)
2013	Mogi Mirim	29	(5)
2014–2015	Oeste	78	(14)
2016	→ Bucheon FC 1995 (loan)	36	(9)
2017	Bucheon FC 1995	28	(12)
2018–2019	Suwon Samsung Bluewings	36	(8)
2020	Guarani	28	(6)
2021	Coritiba	44	(11)
2022–2023	Cruzeiro	16	(1)
2023	→ Avaí (loan)	31	(9)
2024–2025	Novorizontino	78	(11)
2026–	Criciúma	16	(3)
- * Club domestic league appearances and goals as of 15 April 2026

Wagner da Silva Souza (born 30 January 1990), commonly known as Waguininho, is a Brazilian footballer who plays as a forward for Criciúma.

== Career ==
Waguininho joined the K League 2 side Bucheon FC 1995 in January 2016.

== Career statistics ==
As of match played 11 November 2023

Club	Season	League			State League		Cup		Conmebol		Other		Total	
Club	Season	Division	Apps	Goals	Apps	Goals	Apps	Goals	Apps	Goals	Apps	Goals	Apps	Goals
São Vicente	2010	Paulista 2ª Divisão	—		17	5	—		—		—		17	5
São Vicente	2011	Paulista 2ª Divisão	—		12	4	—		—		—		12	4
São Vicente	2012	Paulista 2ª Divisão	—		24	14	—		—		—		24	14
São Vicente	Total		—		53	23	—		—		—		53	23
Mogi Mirim	2013	Série C	11	0	18	5	—		—		—		29	5
Oeste	2014	Série B	16	2	11	2	—		—		—		27	4
Oeste	2015	Série B	33	6	18	4	—		—		—		51	10
Oeste	Total		49	8	29	6	—		—		—		78	14
Bucheon FC 1995 (loan)	2016	K League Challenge	36	9	—		3	2	—		—		39	11
Bucheon FC 1995	2017	K League Challenge	28	12	—		3	0	—		—		31	12
Suwon Samsung Bluewings	2018	K League 1	17	7	—		0	0	9	3	—		26	10
Suwon Samsung Bluewings	2019	K League 1	19	1	—		2	0	—		—		21	1
Suwon Samsung Bluewings	Total		36	8	—		2	0	9	3	—		47	11
Guarani	2020	Série B	23	4	5	2	—		—		—		28	6
Coritiba	2021	Série B	34	9	10	2	4	0	—		—		48	11
Cruzeiro	2022	Série B	6	0	10	1	4	0	—		—		20	1
Avaí (loan)	2023	Série B	22	4	9	5	—		—		—		31	9
Career total			245	54	134	44	16	2	9	3	0	0	404	103
