= Cléo Silva =

Brazilian footballer (born 1989)

Personal information
- Full name: Cleone Santos Silva
- Date of birth: 21 November 1989 (age 36)
- Place of birth: Salgado, Brazil
- Height: 1.73 m (5 ft 8 in)
- Position: Forward

Team information
- Current team: Barra-SC

Senior career*
Years	Team	Apps	(Gls)
2011–2014	Rio Preto		
2012	→ Grêmio Maringá (loan)		
2013	→ Foz do Iguaçu (loan)		
2014–2022	Novorizontino	185	(30)
2014	→ Itumbiara (loan)		
2014	→ Parauapebas (loan)		
2015	→ Boa Esporte (loan)	7	(0)
2015	→ Cuiabá (loan)	6	(1)
2016	→ Joinville (loan)	14	(0)
2016	→ Botafogo–SP (loan)	4	(0)
2017	→ Luverdense (loan)	14	(0)
2018	→ São Bento (loan)	16	(0)
2019	→ Operário Ferroviário (loan)	12	(0)
2023	Brusque	26	(3)
2023–	Zakho		
2023–	Santo André	7	(1)
2023–	Náutico	5	(0)
2023–	CRAC	13	(2)
2023–	Barra-SC	48	(3)
- * Club domestic league appearances and goals as of 11 November 2026

Cleone Santos Silva (born 21 November 1989), known by Cléo Silva, is a Brazilian footballer who plays as a forward for Barra-SC.

== Career statistics ==
=== Club ===
As of 12 August 2020

Club	Season	League			State League		Cup		Continental		Other		Total	
Club	Season	Division	Apps	Goals	Apps	Goals	Apps	Goals	Apps	Goals	Apps	Goals	Apps	Goals
Rio Preto	2012	Paulista A2	–		15	0	–		–		–		15	0
Rio Preto	2013	Paulista A3	–		17	1	–		–		13 (Note: Appearances in the Copa Paulista)	1	30	2
Rio Preto	2014	Paulista A3	–		24	4	–		–		–		24	4
Rio Preto	Total		–		56	5	–		–		13	1	69	6
Novorizontino	2015	Paulista A2	–		18	3	–		–		–		18	3
Novorizontino	2016	Paulista	–		14	1	–		–		–		14	1
Novorizontino	2017	Paulista	–		11	2	–		–		–		11	2
Novorizontino	2018	Série D	10	2	11	1	–		–		–		21	3
Novorizontino	2019	Série D	7	3	13	3	–		–		–		20	6
Novorizontino	2020	Série D	–		13	2	1	0	–		–		14	2
Novorizontino	Total		17	5	80	12	1	0	–		–		98	17
Boa Esporte (loan)	2015	Série B	7	0	–		–		–		–		7	0
Cuiabá (loan)	2015	Série C	6	1	–		–		–		–		6	1
Joinville (loan)	2016	Série B	11	0	–		3	0	–		–		14	0
Botafogo–SP (loan)	2016	Série C	4	0	–		–		–		–		4	0
Luverdense (loan)	2017	Série B	14	0	–		–		–		–		14	0
São Bento (loan)	2018	Série B	16	0	–		–		–		–		16	0
Operário Ferroviário (loan)	2019	Série B	13	0	–		–		–		–		13	0
Career total			88	6	136	17	4	0	0	0	13	1	241	24
