= Jhemerson =

Brazilian footballer

Personal information
- Full name: Jhemerson Guimarães Gaigher
- Date of birth: 27 January 1997 (age 29)
- Place of birth: Anchieta, Brazil
- Height: 1.73 m (5 ft 8 in)
- Position: Midfielder

Team information
- Current team: Guarani (on loan from Tombense)

Youth career
- 2010–2012: Gol Brasil-MG
- 2013–2016: Araxá
- 2016–2019: Vitória

Senior career*
Years	Team	Apps	(Gls)
2017–2019	Vitória	19	(2)
2019	Paraná	12	(0)
2020–	Tombense	33	(2)
2021–2022	→ Confiança (loan)	28	(3)
2023–2024	→ Brusque (loan)	75	(4)
2025	→ Operário Ferroviário (loan)	9	(0)
2025–	→ Guarani (loan)	3	(0)
- * Club domestic league appearances and goals as of 24 October 2025

Jhemerson Guimarães Gaigher (born 27 January 1997), simply known as Jhemerson, is a Brazilian professional footballer who plays as a midfielder for Guarani, on loan from Tombense.

== Career ==
Jhemerson began his professional career at EC Vitória, after standing out for Araxá EC in a Copa São Paulo de Futebol Jr. He was part of the state champion squad in 2017 and remained at the club until 2019, when he signed with Paraná Clube. In 2020 he signed a contract with Tombense, the team that owns his rights. He had loan spells in 2021 at Confiança, and since 2023 he has played for Brusque FC de Santa Catarina. In 2025, he was loaned to Operário Ferroviário, where he was part of the state championship-winning squad. He was later loaned again to Guarani FC.

== Honours ==
Vitória

- Campeonato Baiano: 2017

Brusque

- Recopa Catarinense: 2023

Operário Ferroviário

- Campeonato Paranaense: 2025
