= Fellipe Mateus =

Brazilian footballer

Personal information
- Full name: Fellipe Mateus de Sena Araújo
- Date of birth: 12 February 1991 (age 35)
- Place of birth: Campina Grande, Brazil
- Height: 1.78 m (5 ft 10 in)
- Position: Midfielder

Team information
- Current team: Criciúma
- Number: 7

Youth career
- ECUS
- São Bernardo

Senior career*
Years	Team	Apps	(Gls)
2011–2018	São Bernardo	18	(0)
2011	→ Mauaense (loan)	11	(1)
2012	→ Cuiabá (loan)	4	(0)
2013	→ Ferroviária (loan)	7	(0)
2015	→ União Barbarense (loan)	19	(2)
2016	→ Boa Esporte (loan)	23	(5)
2017	→ Boa Esporte (loan)	30	(3)
2018	→ Juventude (loan)	24	(3)
2018–2021	Ferroviária	39	(4)
2019	→ Figueirense (loan)	31	(4)
2021–	Criciúma	183	(19)
- * Club domestic league appearances and goals as of 15 April 2026

Fellipe Mateus de Sena Araújo (born 12 February 1991), known as Fellipe Mateus, is a Brazilian footballer who plays as a midfielder for Criciúma.

== Career ==
Born in Campina Grande, Paraíba, Fellipe Mateus made his senior debut while on loan at Mauaense, as the club had a partnership with São Bernardo. He never managed to establish himself as a starter for Tigre, serving loan stints at Cuiabá, Ferroviária, União Barbarense, Boa Esporte and Juventude; with Boa he lifted the 2016 Série C title.

On 28 September 2018, Fellipe Mateus returned to Ferroviária in a permanent deal. On 7 April of the following year, he was loaned to Figueirense for the remainder of the season.

On 20 May 2021, Fellipe Mateus signed for Criciúma. On 3 April 2023, after winning the 2022 Campeonato Catarinense Série B and achieving promotion in the 2022 Série C, he renewed his contract with the club until December 2024.

== Career statistics ==
As of 30 April 2024

Club	Season	League			State League		Cup		Continental		Other		Total	
Club	Season	Division	Apps	Goals	Apps	Goals	Apps	Goals	Apps	Goals	Apps	Goals	Apps	Goals
Mauaense (loan)	2011	Paulista 2ª Divisão	—		11	1	—		—		—		11	1
São Bernardo	2012	Paulista A2	—		4	0	—		—		—		4	0
São Bernardo	2013	Paulista	—		0	0	0	0	—		20 (Note: Appearance(s) in Copa Paulista)	4	20	4
São Bernardo	2014	Paulista	—		1	0	0	0	—		19	3	20	3
São Bernardo	2015	Paulista	—		0	0	—		—		11	1	11	1
São Bernardo	2016	Paulista	—		4	0	—		—		—		4	0
São Bernardo	2017	Série D	0	0	9	0	—		—		—		9	0
São Bernardo	Total		0	0	18	0	0	0	—		50	8	68	8
Cuiabá (loan)	2012	Série C	4	0	—		—		—		—		4	0
Ferroviária (loan)	2013	Paulista A2	—		7	0	—		—		—		7	0
União Barbarense (loan)	2015	Paulista A2	—		19	2	—		—		—		19	2
Boa Esporte (loan)	2016	Série C	23	5	—		—		—		—		23	5
Boa Esporte (loan)	2017	Série B	30	3	—		—		—		—		30	3
Juventude	2018	Série B	14	2	10	0	2	0	—		—		26	2
Ferroviária	2018	Série D	0	0	—		—		—		11	2	11	2
Ferroviária	2019	Série D	0	0	10	0	—		—		—		10	0
Ferroviária	2020	Série D	14	4	9	0	1	0	—		—		24	4
Ferroviária	2021	Série D	0	0	6	0	—		—		—		6	0
Ferroviária	Total		14	4	25	0	1	0	—		11	2	51	6
Figueirense (loan)	2019	Série B	31	4	—		—		—		—		31	4
Criciúma	2021	Série C	18	2	—		3	1	—		1 (Note: Appearance(s) in Copa Santa Catarina)	0	22	3
Criciúma	2022	Série B	36	1	6	0	2	0	—		—		44	1
Criciúma	2023	Série B	36	5	16	3	2	0	—		—		54	8
Criciúma	2024	Série A	3	2	16	3	2	0	—		—		21	5
Criciúma	Total		93	10	38	6	9	1	—		1	0	141	17
Career total			209	28	128	9	12	1	0	0	62	10	411	48

== Honours ==
São Bernardo

- Copa Paulista: 2013

Boa Esporte

- Campeonato Brasileiro Série C: 2016

Criciúma

- Campeonato Catarinense Série B: 2022
- Campeonato Catarinense: 2023, 2024
- Recopa Catarinense: 2024, 2025
