= Matheus Nogueira (footballer, born 1986) =

Brazilian footballer

Personal information
- Full name: Matheus Nogueira da Silva
- Date of birth: 8 August 1986 (age 40)
- Place of birth: São Paulo, Brazil
- Height: 1.90 m (6 ft 3 in)
- Position: Goalkeeper

Team information
- Current team: Brusque
- Number: 1

Youth career
- 2006: Portuguesa

Senior career*
Years	Team	Apps	(Gls)
2006–2008	Portuguesa		
2008	→ São Bento (loan)		
2008	→ Batatais (loan)		
2009	Batatais		
2009	→ Barretos (loan)		
2010	América–SP	5	(0)
2010	Taboão da Serra	7	(0)
2011	Audax	6	(0)
2011	Sumaré	0	(0)
2012	Batatais	25	(0)
2012	Cotia	0	(0)
2013–2014	Itapirense	24	(0)
2014	Sumaré	0	(0)
2014–2015	Independente–SP	14	(0)
2016	Batatais	22	(0)
2016	Ferroviária	10	(0)
2017	América-RN	1	(0)
2018	Água Santa	7	(0)
2018	Maringá	8	(0)
2019	Santo André	2	(0)
2020–2021	Brasil de Pelotas	48	(0)
2022	Londrina	40	(0)
2023–	Brusque	167	(0)
- * Club domestic league appearances and goals as of 9 November 2026

Matheus Nogueira da Silva (born 8 August 1986), known as Matheus Nogueira, is a Brazilian footballer who plays for Brusque as a goalkeeper.

== Career statistics ==
As of 21 February 2017

Club	Season	League			State League		Cup		Continental		Other		Total	
Club	Season	Division	Apps	Goals	Apps	Goals	Apps	Goals	Apps	Goals	Apps	Goals	Apps	Goals
América–SP	2010	Paulista A2	—		5	0	—		—		—		5	0
Audax	2011	Paulista A2	—		6	0	—		—		—		6	0
Batatais	2012	Paulista A3	—		25	0	—		—		—		25	0
Itapirense	2013	Paulista A3	—		24	0	—		—		—		24	0
Itapirense	2014	Paulista A2	—		1	0	—		—		—		1	0
Itapirense	Subtotal		—		25	0	—		—		—		25	0
Independente–SP	2014	Paulista A3	—		—		—		—		12 (Note: All appearance(s) in Copa Paulista)	0	12	0
Independente–SP	2015	Paulista A2	—		2	0	—		—		—		2	0
Independente–SP	Subtotal		—		2	0	—		—		12	0	14	0
Batatais	2016	Paulista A2	—		22	0	—		—		—		22	0
Ferroviária	2016	Paulista	—		—		1	0	—		20	0	21	0
Ferroviária	2017	Paulista	—		4	0	1	0	—		—		5	0
Ferroviária	Subtotal		—		4	0	2	0	—		20	0	26	0
Career total			0	0	89	0	2	0	0	0	32	0	123	0
