= Estádio Aníbal Torres Costa =

Football stadium in Tubarão, Santa Catarina, Brazil

Coordinates: 28.4667°S 49.0069°W

- Aníbal Costa
- Interactive map of Estádio Aníbal Torres Costa
- Full name: Estádio Aníbal Torres Costa
- Location: Tubarão, Santa Catarina, Brazil
- Owner: Hercílio Luz Futebol Clube
- Capacity: 15,000
- Surface: grass
- Field size: (100 m X 70 m)

Construction
- Opened: 1955

Tenants
- Tubarão Futebol Clube; Hercílio Luz Futebol Clube

Estádio Aníbal Torres Costa, usually simply Aníbal Costa is an association football stadium in Tubarão, near Santa Catarina, Brazil. The stadium holds 15,000 people. It was inaugurated in 1955. The stadium is owned by Hercílio Luz Futebol Clube and it is the home ground of Tubarão Futebol Clube.
