= Hercílio Luz Futebol Clube =

Hercílio Luz
- Full name: Hercílio Luz Futebol Clube
- Nickname: Leão do Sul
- Founded: 22 December 1918 (107 years ago)
- Ground: Aníbal Costa, Tubarão, Santa Catarina state, Brazil
- Capacity: 15,000
- President: Wamerson Wiggers
- Head Coach: Paulo Baier
- League: Campeonato Catarinense Série B
- 2025: Catarinense, 12th of 12 (relegated)
- Website: www.hercilioluzfc.com.br
Home colours	Away colours

Hercílio Luz Futebol Clube, often abbreviated to Hercílio Luz, is a Brazilian football club based in Tubarão, Santa Catarina. Founded on 22 December 1918, it was the first Santa Catarina club to compete in the Campeonato Brasileiro Série A and the first southern Santa Catarina team to win the state championship. It currently plays in the Campeonato Catarinense Série A, the first division of the Santa Catarina state league, and the Campeonato Brasileiro Série D.

== History ==
The club was founded on December 23, 1918. They won the Campeonato Catarinense in 1957 and in 1958. Hercílio Luz competed in the Taça Brasil in 1959, but they were eliminated in the first stage by Atlético Paranaense.

== Honours ==
=== Official tournaments ===
State
Competitions	Titles	Seasons
Campeonato Catarinense	2	1957, 1958
Campeonato Catarinense Série B	1	2026

=== Runners-up ===
- Copa Santa Catarina (2): 2018, 2022
- Campeonato Catarinense Série B (3): 1994, 2017, 2020

== Stadium ==
Hercílio Luz Futebol Clube play their home games at Aníbal Costa. The stadium has a maximum capacity of 15,000 people.
