= Gustavo (footballer, born 1993) =

Brazilian footballer

Personal information
- Full name: Luiz Gustavo de Almeida Pinto
- Date of birth: 10 March 1993 (age 33)
- Place of birth: Colatina, Brazil
- Height: 1.87 m (6 ft 2 in)
- Position: Goalkeeper

Team information
- Current team: América Mineiro
- Number: 1

Youth career
- –2010: Vitória

Senior career*
Years	Team	Apps	(Gls)
2010–2017	Vitória	5	(0)
2017	→ Atlântico (loan)	9	(0)
2018	Jequié	7	(0)
2018	Itumbiara	1	(0)
2019	Novo Hamburgo	13	(0)
2019–2020	Altético Goianiense	1	(0)
2020	→ Novorizontino (loan)	0	(0)
2020	→ Sampaio Corrêa (loan)	33	(0)
2021–2024	Criciúma	100	(0)
2025	Juventude	20	(0)
2025	→ América Mineiro (loan)	14	(0)
2026–	América Mineiro	32	(0)

International career^{‡}
2013	Brazil U20	4	(0)
- * Club domestic league appearances and goals as of 18 November 2026 ‡ National team caps and goals as of 13 July 2013

Luiz Gustavo de Almeida Pinto (born 10 March 1993), known as Gustavo, is a Brazilian footballer who plays as a goalkeeper for América Mineiro.

Gustavo has previously played in Campeonato Brasileiro Série B for Vitória and Campeonato Brasileiro Série D for Itumbiara.
