= Concórdia Atlético Clube =

Concórdia
- Full name: Concórdia Atlético Clube
- Nicknames: Galo do Oeste; CAC
- Founded: 2 March 2005
- Ground: Estádio Domingos Machado de Lima, Concórdia
- Capacity: 5,000
- Chairman: Jonas Guzzatto
- Manager: Gilmar Silva
- League: Campeonato Catarinense
- 2025: Catarinense, 10th of 12
- Website: http://galodooeste.com.br/
Home colours	Away colours

Concórdia Atlético Clube, usually known simply as Concórdia, is a Brazilian football club from Concórdia, Santa Catarina.

== History ==
Founded on 2 March 2005, Concórdia first appeared in the top tier of the Campeonato Catarinense in 2011 after finishing second in the second tier of the previous year; the club, however, subsequently suffered relegation. In June 2012, the club confirmed their place in the year's Campeonato Brasileiro Série D, but was knocked out in the first phase.

== Honours ==
=== Official tournaments ===
State
Competitions	Titles	Seasons
Copa Santa Catarina	1	2024
Campeonato Catarinense Série B	1	2017

=== Runners-up ===
- Copa Santa Catarina (2): 2020, 2023
- Recopa Catarinense (1): 2025
- Campeonato Catarinense Série B (2): 2010, 2019
