= Estádio Heriberto Hülse =

Football stadium in Criciúma, Santa Catarina, Brazil

Coordinates: 28°41′03″S 49°22′03″W

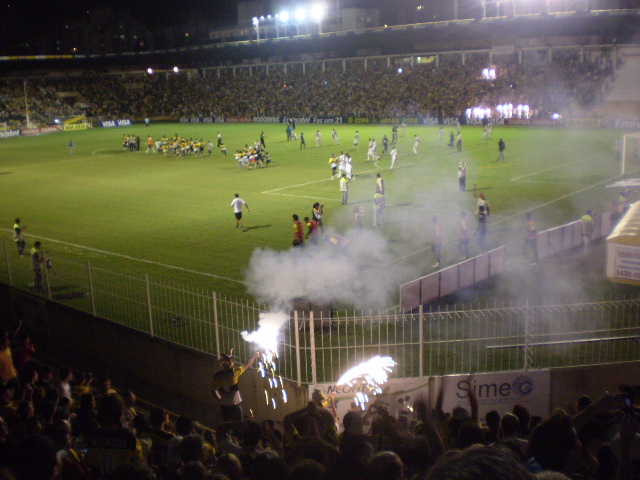
- Sisbrace
- Interactive map of Estádio Heriberto Hülse
- Location: Criciúma, Brazil
- Capacity: 19,225
- Field size: 110 x 75 m

Construction
- Built: 1955
- Opened: 16 October 1955

Tenant
- Criciúma Esporte Clube

Estádio Heriberto Hülse, is a football stadium located in Criciúma, Santa Catarina, Brazil. The stadium holds 19,225 people. It was built in 1955. The stadium is owned by Criciúma Esporte Clube, and its formal name honors Heriberto Hülse, who was Santa Catarina's governor between 1958 and 1960, and was the donor of the stadium floodlights.

== History ==
The inaugural match was played on 18 October 1955, when Imbituba beat Comerciário 1–0. The first goal of the stadium was scored by Imbituba's Valdo.

The stadium's attendance record currently stands at 32,534 people, set on 20 May 1995, when Criciúma and São Paulo drew 1-1 in the Copa Libertadores.

The most important match played at the stadium occurred in 1991. Criciúma, managed by Luiz Felipe Scolari, won the Copa do Brasil after a 0–0 draw against Grêmio. After the title, Criciúma's board of directors expanded the stadium maximum capacity from 15,000 people to 25,000 people. This was done because the club was qualified to play the following year's Copa Libertadores, and, to be allowed to play their home matches at Heriberto Hülse, it was necessary to expand the stadium maximum capacity.
