= Clube Náutico Marcílio Dias =

Brazilian football club

Marcílio Dias
- Full name: Clube Náutico Marcílio Dias
- Nicknames: Marinheiro (Sailor), Cílio
- Founded: 17 March 1919; 107 years ago
- Ground: Hercílio Luz
- Capacity: 6,010
- President: Lucas Costa Brunet
- Head coach: Moisés Egert
- League: Campeonato Brasileiro Série D Campeonato Catarinense
- 2025 2025: Série D, 28th of 64; Catarinense, 8th of 12
Home colours	Away colours	Third colours

Clube Náutico Marcílio Dias, known simply as Marcílio Dias, is a Brazilian football club from Itajaí, Santa Catarina state. The club plays its home matches at Hercílio Luz and competed in Copa João Havelange in 2000, in the Campeonato Brasileiro Série B in 1989, in the Campeonato Brasileiro Série C in 1988, 1995, 2001, 2003, 2005 and 2006. The club won the Recopa Sul-Brasileira in 2007, the state championship in 1963, and the state cup in 2007.

== History ==
The club was founded on March 17, 1919, by Alírio Gandra, Victor Miranda and Gabriel João Collares with the intention to develop rowing in Itajaí city. The club's name was given after a suggestion by its first president, Ignácio Mascarenhas.

In 1963, Marcílio Dias won its first title, which was the state championship.

In 1988, the club competed in the Campeonato Brasileiro Série C for the first time, being eliminated in the third stage of the competition. In the following year, Marcílio Dias competed in the Campeonato Brasileiro Série B, but was eliminated in the first stage of the competition.

In 1995, Marcílio Dias competed again in the Campeonato Brasileiro Série C, and also competed in its first international competition, which was the Torneio Mercosul, reaching the semifinal stage of the competition. In 1999, the club won the Campeonato Catarinense Second Level, after beating in the final a club from the same city, Itajaí.

The club competed in the yellow module of Copa João Havelange in 2000, but was eliminated in the competition's first stage, in 2001, in 2003, in 2005 and in 2006 Marcílio Dias competed in the Campeonato Brasileiro Série C, being eliminated in the first stage in those seasons. In 2007, Marcílio Dias won the Copa Santa Catarina, thus qualifying to the following year's Campeonato Brasileiro Série C and the same season's Recopa Sul-Brasileira. On December 8, 2007, the club beat Caxias 4–1, and won the Recopa Sul-Brasileira. Marcílio Dias' Luiz Ricardo, with five goals, was the competition's top goalscorer.

== Honours ==
=== Official tournaments ===
Regional
Competitions	Titles	Seasons
Recopa Sul-Brasileira	1^{s}	2007
State
Competitions	Titles	Seasons
Campeonato Catarinense	1	1963
Copa Santa Catarina	3	2007, 2022, 2023
Campeonato Catarinense Série B	3^{s}	1999, 2010, 2013

- record
- ^{S} shared record

=== Others tournaments ===
==== State ====
- Taça Governador do Estado (2): 1988, 1989

==== State Regional ====
- Campeonato do Vale do Itajaí (3): 1939, 1944, 1946
- Torneio Início do Vale do Itajaí (2): 1944, 1945

==== City ====
- Campeonato Municipal (LID) (5): 1958, 1960, 1961, 1962, 1963
- Campeonato Municipal (ASVI) (1): 1938
- Torneio Início de Itajaí (LID) (5): 1952, 1953, 1955, 1957, 1959

=== Runners-up ===
- Campeonato Sul-Brasileiro (1): 1962
- Campeonato Catarinense (8): 1930, 1944, 1960, 1961, 1962, 1967, 1986, 2000
- Copa Santa Catarina (3): 2012, 2019, 2024
- Recopa Catarinense (2): 2023, 2024
- Campeonato Catarinense Série B (3): 2005, 2006, 2018

== Stadium ==
Marcílio Dias's home stadium is Hercílio Luz, built in 1921, with a maximum capacity of 12,000 people.

== Club name ==
The club is named after the guerrilheiro da marinha Marcílio Dias, who fought in the Paraguayan War and died in the Battle of Riachuelo.

== Current squad ==
Note: Flags indicate national team as defined under FIFA eligibility rules; some limited exceptions apply. Players may hold more than one non-FIFA nationality.

No.	Pos.	Nation	Player
—	GK	BRA	Igor
—	GK	BRA	Eduardo
—	DF	BRA	Alex Moraes
—	DF	BRA	Edimar
—	DF	BRA	Josias Basso
—	DF	BRA	Neguette
—	DF	BRA	Maurício Ribeiro
—	DF	BRA	Sidnei
—	DF	BRA	Alex Cazumba
—	DF	BRA	André Luiz
—	DF	BRA	Felipe Correia

No.	Pos.	Nation	Player
—	MF	BRA	Batista
—	MF	BRA	Xipote
—	MF	BRA	Cacá
—	MF	BRA	Leandro Branco
—	MF	BRA	Mineiro
—	FW	BRA	Adriano
—	FW	BRA	João Paulo
—	FW	BRA	Leandrinho
—	FW	BRA	Rodrigo
—	FW	BRA	Tardelli
—	FW	BRA	Toni
