= Criciúma Esporte Clube =

Brazilian association football club based in Criciúma, Santa Catarina, Brazil

Criciúma
- Full name: Criciúma Esporte Clube
- Nickname: Tigre (Tiger)
- Founded: 13 May 1947; 79 years ago
- Ground: Heriberto Hülse
- Capacity: 19,300
- President: Valter Minotto
- Head coach: Umberto Louzer
- League: Campeonato Brasileiro Série B Campeonato Catarinense
- 2025 2025: Série B, 5th of 20; Catarinense, 5th of 12
- Website: www.criciumaec.com.br
Home colors	Away colors	Third colors

Criciúma Esporte Clube is a Brazilian professional club based in Criciúma, Santa Catarina founded on 13 May 1947.

Criciúma is one of the most successful team from Santa Catarina, having won the 1991 Copa do Brasil, the 2002 Campeonato Brasileiro Série B, and the 2006 Campeonato Brasileiro Série C.

== History ==
Criciúma Esporte Clube was founded on May 13, 1947, as Comerciário Esporte Clube; however the club folded due to a financial crisis in the 1960s. The club was refounded in 1976 by some of the original Comerciário Esporte Clube members. In 1978 the club was renamed as Criciúma Esporte Clube, and its current colors black, yellow and white were adopted in 1984. The present colors of Criciúma Esporte Clube are the reason the club is called Tigre (meaning Tiger).

The club's greatest feat was winning the 1991 Copa do Brasil under coach Felipe Scolari, later World Cup winner with Brazil, while being in the second division. The achievement qualified Criciúma for the following year's Copa Libertadores.

In the following years, the club was not very successful. After being promoted to Série A in 1992, the club played in the division for 5 years before getting relegated. In 2005, Criciúma, after a very poor campaign, was relegated to the Brazilian Série C. In 2006, Criciúma won the Série C, and was promoted back to the Série B.

After a period of crisis in the club, in 2012 the club regained forces, and after being in the first four places the entire championship returned to the Série A.

== Honours ==
Criciúma has won three national level championships. Winning the 1991 Copa do Brasil qualified the club to the 1992 Copa Libertadores where Criciúma finished in the 5th place, surpassing even the expectations of its fans. These achievements make Criciúma one of the most successful teams from Santa Catarina.

=== Official tournaments ===
National
Competitions	Titles	Seasons
Copa do Brasil	1	1991
Campeonato Brasileiro Série B	1	2002
Campeonato Brasileiro Série C	1	2006
State
Competitions	Titles	Seasons
Campeonato Catarinense	12	1968 ^{(1)}, 1986, 1989, 1990, 1991, 1993, 1995, 1998, 2005, 2013, 2023, 2024
Copa Santa Catarina	1	1993
Recopa Catarinense	2^{s}	2024, 2025
Campeonato Catarinense Série B	1	2022

- record
- ^{S} shared record

^{1} Champion in 1968 as Comerciário Esporte Clube

=== Others tournaments ===
==== State ====
- Taça Governador do Estado (8): 1986, 1987, 1990, 1991, 1992, 1993, 1994, 1995
- Taça ACESC (1): 2026

==== State Regional ====
- Campeonato Regional da LARM (9): 1949, 1950, 1951, 1955, 1957, 1958, 1960, 1961, 1975

=== Runners-up ===
- Campeonato Brasileiro Série B (1): 2012
- Campeonato Catarinense (10): 1980, 1981, 1982, 1987, 1994, 2001, 2002, 2007, 2008, 2011
- Copa Santa Catarina (1): 1998

== Stadium ==
Criciúma's stadium is Estádio Heriberto Hülse, built in 1955, with a maximum capacity of 19,900 people.

== Current squad ==
As of 30 October 2026

Note: Flags indicate national team as defined under FIFA eligibility rules; some limited exceptions apply. Players may hold more than one non-FIFA nationality.

No.	Pos.	Nation	Player
1	GK	BRA	Alisson
3	DF	BRA	Rodrigo (captain)
4	DF	BRA	Luciano Castán
5	MF	BRA	Eduardo
6	DF	BRA	Marcinho
7	MF	BRA	Fellipe Mateus
8	MF	BRA	Gui Lobo
9	FW	BRA	Nicolas
10	MF	BRA	Jhonata Robert
11	FW	BRA	Romarinho
13	FW	BRA	Waguininho
14	MF	BRA	Ronald (on loan from Vitória)
21	FW	BRA	João Carlos
22	DF	BRA	Marcelo Hermes
30	DF	BRA	Octávio Henrique
31	DF	BRA	Hiago Alves

No.	Pos.	Nation	Player
32	GK	BRA	Airton
33	FW	BRA	Yuri Tanque
34	DF	BRA	Bruno Alves
37	DF	BRA	César Martins
39	FW	BRA	Thales
41	MF	BRA	Jean Irmer
43	DF	BRA	Ruan Carvalho
50	MF	BRA	Thiaguinho
70	GK	BRA	Pedro Santos
73	GK	BRA	Kauã Moroso
77	FW	BRA	Diego Gonçalves
88	FW	BRA	Cauê
91	FW	VEN	Rómulo Otero (on loan from Nacional Montevideo)
97	DF	BRA	Willean Lepo (on loan from Vitória)
—	DF	BRA	Rômulo Júnior (on loan from Atlético Mineiro)

=== Youth players ===
Note: Flags indicate national team as defined under FIFA eligibility rules; some limited exceptions apply. Players may hold more than one non-FIFA nationality.

No.	Pos.	Nation	Player
19	FW	BRA	Thales
90	FW	BRA	Gabriel Capella

=== Out on loan ===
Note: Flags indicate national team as defined under FIFA eligibility rules; some limited exceptions apply. Players may hold more than one non-FIFA nationality.

No.	Pos.	Nation	Player
—	DF	BRA	Heitor Roca (at Inter de Limeira until 30 November 2026)

== Notable head coaches ==
- (Brazil) Argel Fuchs
- (Brazil) Cláudio Tencati
- (Brazil) Cuca
- (Brazil) Dorival Júnior
- (Brazil) Edson Gaúcho
- (Brazil) Gelson Silva
- (Brazil) Gilson Kleina
- (Brazil) Itamar Schülle
- (Brazil) Lauro Búrigo
- (Brazil) Levir Culpi
- (Brazil) Lori Sandri
- (Brazil) Luiz Gonzaga Milioli
- (Brazil) Luiz Felipe Scolari
- (Brazil) Roberto Cavalo
- (Brazil) Vadão
- (Brazil) Zé Carlos
- (Uruguay) Sergio Ramirez

== 1991 Copa do Brasil ==
Criciúma won the Copa do Brasil 1991, playing the following matches:

Stage	Match	1st Leg	2nd Leg
First Round	Ubiratan – Criciúma	1–1	1–4
Second Round	Criciúma – Atlético Mineiro	1–0	1–0
Quarterfinals	Goiás – Criciúma	0–0	0–3
Semifinals	Remo – Criciúma	0–1	0–2
Final	Grêmio – Criciúma	1–1	0–0

== Competitions record ==
=== First Division (Serie A) ===
Year	Position	Year	Position
1979	67th	1995	16th
1986	9th	1996	21st
1987	6th	1997	24th
1988	23rd	2003	14th
1993	23rd	2004	21st
1994	20th	2013	15th
2014	20th		

=== Second Division (Serie B) ===
Year	Position	Year	Position
1980	54th	1992	3rd
1981	30th	1998	6th
1982	38th	1999	18th
1983	47th	2000	14th
1986	1st	2001	22nd
1987	6th	2002	1st
1989	5th	2005	21st
1990	7th	2007	7th
1991	35th	2008	18th
2011	14th	2012	2nd
2015	12th	2016	8th
2017	13th	2018	14th
2019	19th	2022	8th
2023	3rd		

=== Third Division (Serie C) ===
Year	Position	Year	Position
2006	1st	2009	15th
2010	3rd	2020	

=== Brazilian Cup ===
Year	Position	Year	Position
1990	4th	1999	18th
1991	1st	2002	17th
1992	7th	2003	17th
1994	23rd	2006	15th
1996	6th	2008	13th
2009	26th		

=== Libertadores Cup ===
Year	Position
1992	5th
