= Recopa Catarinense =

- Organiser(s): FCF
- Founded: 2018
- Region: Santa Catarina, Brazil
- Teams: 2
- Related competitions: Campeonato Catarinense; Copa Santa Catarina
- Current champions: Criciúma (2nd title)
- Most championships: Brusque; Criciúma; Figueirense (2 titles each)
- Broadcaster: SporTV

The Recopa Catarinense (English: Santa Catarina Winners Cup), is a super cup tournament organized by the FCF reuniting the winners of Campeonato Catarinense and Copa Santa Catarina of each season, since 2019.

== List of champions ==
Following is the list with all the champions of the Recopa Catarinense.

Year	Venue (date)	Champion	Final Score	Runners-up
2019	Orlando Scarpelli (4 Jul)	Figueirense; 2018 Campeonato Catarinense winners	1–0; Report	Brusque; 2018 Copa Santa Catarina winners
2020	Ressacada (18 Jan)	Brusque; 2019 Copa Santa Catarina winners	2–0; Report	Avaí; 2019 Campeonato Catarinense winners
2021	Arena Condá (21 Feb)	Joinville; 2020 Copa Santa Catarina winners	1–1; 5–3 (pen.); Report	Chapecoense; 2020 Campeonato Catarinense winners
2022	Ressacada (19 Jan)	Figueirense; 2021 Copa Santa Catarina winners	3–1; Report	Avaí; 2021 Campeonato Catarinense winners
2023	Augusto Bauer (12 Jan)	Brusque; 2022 Campeonato Catarinense winners	1–0; Report	Marcílio Dias; 2022 Copa Santa Catarina winners
2024	Heriberto Hülse (16 Jan)	Criciúma; 2023 Campeonato Catarinense winners	2–0; Report	Marcílio Dias; 2023 Copa Santa Catarina winners
2025	Heriberto Hülse (19 Jan)	Criciúma; 2024 Campeonato Catarinense winners	2–0; Report	Concórdia; 2024 Copa Santa Catarina winners

=== Titles by team ===
Rank	Club	Winners	Winning years
1	Brusque	2	2020, 2023
1	Criciúma	2	2024, 2025
1	Figueirense	2	2019, 2022
4	Joinville	1	2021
