= Copa Santa Catarina =

Association football tournament

The Copa Santa Catarina (English: Santa Catarina Cup) is a tournament organized by the Santa Catarina State Football Federation every second half of the season. It is played by Santa Catarina state teams. The competition's winner gains the right to compete in the same year's Recopa Sul-Brasileira and in the following year's Campeonato Brasileiro Série D. The competition was formed in 1990.

== Format ==
In the 2007 season, the competition was played by five clubs and it was divided in three stages. The clubs played against each once in each of the first two stages, and the winners of both stages played the final in two legs.

== List of champions ==
Following is the list with champions and runners-up:

| Season | Champions | Runners-up |
|---|---|---|
| 1990 | Figueirense (1) | Brusque |
| 1991 | Araranguá (1) | Figueirense |
| 1992 | Brusque (1) | Inter de Lages |
| 1993 | Criciúma (1) | Figueirense |
| 1994 | Not held | |
| 1995 | Avaí (1) | Joinville |
| 1996 | Figueirense (2) | Chapecoense |
| 1997 | Not held | |
| 1998 | Tubarão (1) | Criciúma |
| 1999–2005 | Not held | |
| 2006 | Chapecoense (1) | Próspera |
| 2007 | Marcílio Dias (1) | Joinville |
| 2008 | Brusque (2) | Joinville |
| 2009 | Joinville (1) | Metropolitano |
| 2010 | Brusque (3) | Joinville |
| 2011 | Joinville (2) | Brusque |
| 2012 | Joinville (3) | Marcílio Dias |
| 2013 | Joinville (4) | Metropolitano |
| 2014–2016 | Not held | |
| 2017 | Atlético Tubarão (1) | Brusque |
| 2018 | Brusque (4) | Hercílio Luz |
| 2019 | Brusque (5) | Marcílio Dias |
| 2020 | Joinville (5) | Concórdia |
| 2021 | Figueirense (3) | Juventus |
| 2022 | Marcílio Dias (2) | Hercílio Luz |
| 2023 | Marcílio Dias (3) | Concórdia |
| 2024 | Concórdia (1) | Marcílio Dias |
| 2025 | Figueirense (4) | Joinville |

== Titles by team ==
| Club | Titles | Runners-up |
|---|---|---|
| Joinville | 5 (2009, 2011, 2012, 2013, 2020) | 5 (1995, 2007, 2008, 2010, 2025) |
| Brusque | 5 (1992, 2008, 2010, 2018, 2019) | 3 (1990, 2011, 2017) |
| Figueirense | 4 (1990, 1996, 2021, 2025) | 2 (1991, 1993) |
| Marcílio Dias | 3 (2007, 2022, 2023) | 3 (2012, 2019, 2024) |
| Concórdia | 1 (2024) | 2 (2020, 2023) |
| Chapecoense | 1 (2006) | 1 (1996) |
| Criciúma | 1 (1993) | 1 (1998) |
| Araranguá | 1 (1991) | 0 |
| Atlético Tubarão | 1 (2017) | 0 |
| Avaí | 1 (1995) | 0 |
| Tubarão FC | 1 (1998) | 0 |
| Hercílio Luz | 0 | 2 (2018, 2022) |
| Metropolitano | 0 | 2 (2009, 2013) |
| Inter de Lages | 0 | 1 (1992) |
| Juventus | 0 | 1 (2021) |
| Próspera | 0 | 1 (2006) |
