= 2026 Campeonato Catarinense =

Campeonato Catarinense
- Season: 2026
- Dates: 6 January - 8 March
- Champions: Barra
- Relegated: Carlos Renaux; Figueirense; Joinville
- Copa do Brasil: Barra; Chapecoense; Criciúma
- Série D: Camboriú; Santa Catarina
- Matches: 70
- Goals: 168 (2.4 per match)

The 2026 Campeonato Catarinense (officially the Catarinense Fort Atacadista 2026 for sponsorship reasons) was the 101st season of Santa Catarina's top-flight football league organized by FCF. The season began on 6 January and ended on 8 March 2026. Avaí were the defending champions but they were eliminated in the quarter-finals.

== Format ==
The tournament consists of 12 teams competing in four stages. In the first stage, the teams were divided into two groups of six, with each group playing a single round-robin tournament against the teams in the other group. The top four teams in each group will advance to the final stages, while the bottom two will play in the relegation stage, which will see three teams relegated to the 2027 Série B. The final stages (quarter-finals, semi-finals and final) will be played on a home-and-away two-legged basis. Additionally, teams eliminated in the final stages will compete in the Taça ACESC 70 anos, which will determine third place.

Champions and runners-up will qualify for the 2027 Copa do Brasil and the 2027 Copa Sul-Sudeste. Third place will win the Taça ACESC – Associação dos Cronistas Esportivos de Santa Catarina – 70 anos and will also qualify for the 2027 Copa do Brasil. The two best teams not already qualified for the 2027 Série A, Série B or Série C will qualify for the 2027 Campeonato Brasileiro Série D.

== Participating teams ==
Club	Home city	Manager	2025 result	Titles (last)
Avaí	Florianópolis	Cauan de Almeida	1st	19 (2025)
Barra	Balneário Camboriú	Eduardo Souza	9th	0
Brusque	Brusque	Higo Magalhães	6th	2 (2022)
Camboriú	Camboriú	Laécio Aquino	2nd (Série B)	0
Carlos Renaux	Brusque	André Horta	1st (Série B)	2 (1953)
Chapecoense	Chapecó	Gilmar Dal Pozzo	2nd	7 (2020)
Concórdia	Concórdia	Henrique Barcellos	10th	0
Criciúma	Criciúma	Eduardo Baptista	5th	12 (2024)
Figueirense	Florianópolis	Márcio Zanardi	7th	18 (2018)
Joinville	Joinville	Serginho Catarinense	4th	12 (2001)
Marcílio Dias	Itajaí	Emerson Cris	8th	1 (1963)
Santa Catarina	Rio do Sul	Betinho	3rd	0

== First stage ==
For the group stage, the 12 teams were drawn into two groups of six teams each. Each team played on a single round-robin tournament against the six clubs from the other group. The top four teams of each group advanced to the quarter-finals of the knockout stages, while the bottom two teams in each group will play in the relegation stage. The teams were ranked according to points (3 points for a win, 1 point for a draw, and 0 points for a loss). If tied on points, the following criteria would be used to determine the ranking: 1. Wins; 2. Goal difference; 3. Goals scored; 4. Fewest red cards; 5. Fewest yellow cards; 6. Draw.

=== Group A ===
Pos	Team	Pld	W	D	L	GF	GA	GD	Pts	Qualification
1	Brusque	6	3	3	0	9	6	+3	12	Advance to Final stages
2	Avaí	6	3	1	2	8	7	+1	10	Advance to Final stages
3	Camboriú	6	2	3	1	8	6	+2	9	Advance to Final stages
4	Concórdia	6	2	1	3	5	10	−5	7	Advance to Final stages
5	Marcílio Dias	6	2	0	4	6	6	0	6	Advance to Relegation stage
6	Joinville	6	0	1	5	3	14	−11	1	Advance to Relegation stage

Source: FCF

=== Group B ===
Pos	Team	Pld	W	D	L	GF	GA	GD	Pts	Qualification
1	Santa Catarina	6	3	3	0	10	5	+5	12	Advance to Final stages
2	Chapecoense	6	3	2	1	11	5	+6	11	Advance to Final stages
3	Criciúma	6	3	2	1	10	8	+2	11	Advance to Final stages
4	Barra	6	3	0	3	8	5	+3	9	Advance to Final stages
5	Figueirense	6	2	1	3	6	8	−2	7	Advance to Relegation stage
6	Carlos Renaux	6	1	1	4	4	8	−4	4	Advance to Relegation stage

Source: FCF

=== Results ===
Home \ Away	BAR	CAR	CHA	CRI	FIG	SAN
Avaí	2–1	1–0	1–1			
Brusque		1–0			2–1	1–1
Camboriú	1–0		2–0	1–2		
Concórdia			1–2		1–0	0–0
Joinville		0–1		0–0	2–3	
Marcílio Dias	0–1			2–0		0–1

Home \ Away	AVA	BRU	CAM	CON	JOI	MAR
Barra		0–1		5–1	1–0	
Carlos Renaux			1–1	0–1		2–4
Chapecoense		1–1			6–0	1–0
Criciúma	2–1	3–3		3–1		
Figueirense	0–2		1–1			1–0
Santa Catarina	3–1		2–2		3–1	

Source:FCF
Legend: Blue = home team win; Yellow = draw; Red = away team win.

== Final stages ==
Starting from the quarter-finals, the teams will play a single-elimination tournament. The matches will be played on a home-and-away two-legged basis, with the higher-seeded team hosting the second leg. If tied on aggregate, the penalty shoot-out will be used to determine the winners.

Teams eliminated in the quarter-finals will play in the Taça ACESC 70 anos play-offs, while those eliminated in the semi-finals will play in the Taça ACESC 70 anos semi-finals.

=== Bracket ===
Quarter-finals
Camboriú (p)	1	1	2 (4)
Avaí	2	0	2 (3)
Barra	1	1	2
Santa Catarina	1	0	1
Concórdia	0	1	1 (4)
Brusque (p)	0	1	1 (5)
Criciúma	1	0	1
Chapecoense	2	0	2

Semi-finals
Camboriú	1	0	1
Barra	1	3	4
Brusque	1	0	1
Chapecoense	0	3	3

Finals
Barra	3	0	3
Chapecoense	1	1	2

=== Quarter-finals ===
Team 1	Agg.	Team 2	1st leg	2nd leg
Concórdia	1–1 (4–5 p)	Brusque	0–0	1–1
Barra	2–1	Santa Catarina	1–1	1–0
Camboriú	2–2 (4–3 p)	Avaí	1–2	1–0
Criciúma	1–2	Chapecoense	1–2	0–0

==== Group C ====
1 February 2026
17:00

Concórdia	0–0	Brusque
	Report

Estádio Domingos Machado de Lima, Concórdia
Attendance: 1,023
Referee: Fernando Henrique de Medeiros Miranda

7 February 2026
19:30

Brusque	1–1	Concórdia
Álvaro 90+2'		Lucas Barboza 63'
Penalties
Álvaro (penalty scored); Petterson Novaes (penalty scored); Raimar (penalty scored); Alisson Cassiano (penalty scored); Rafael Milhorim (penalty scored)	5–4	(penalty scored) Paulo Matheus; (penalty scored) Caike Duarte; (penalty scored) Enzo Trentin; (penalty scored) Matheus Maia; (penalty missed) Petterson

Arena Simon, Brusque
Referee: Igor da Silva Albuquerque

Brusque qualified for the semi-finals.

==== Group D ====
31 January 2026
18:30

Barra	1–1	Santa Catarina
Éverton Alemão 45'	Report	Bruninho 13'

Arena Barra FC, Itajaí
Attendance: 2,011
Referee: Júlio César Pfleger

7 February 2026
19:00

Santa Catarina	0–1	Barra
		Warley 85'

Estádio Municipal Alfredo João Krieck, Rio do Sul
Referee: Gustavo Ervino Bauermann

Barra qualified for the semi-finals.

==== Group E ====
31 January 2026
16:30

Camboriú	1–2	Avaí
Wermeson 85' (pen.)	Report	Thayllon 7'; Allyson 9'

Estádio Orlando Scarpelli, Florianópolis
Attendance: 839
Referee: Cinésio Mendes Júnior

8 February 2026
18:00

Avaí	0–1	Camboriú
		Kaká 73'
Penalties
Daniel Penha (penalty scored); DG (penalty scored); Jean Lucas (penalty missed); Luiz Henrique (penalty scored); Avenatti (penalty missed)	3–4	(penalty scored) Wermeson; (penalty scored) Kaká; (penalty scored) Nádson; (penalty scored) Reginaldo

Estádio da Ressacada, Florianópolis
Referee: Franciel dos Santos Martins

Camboriú qualified for the semi-finals.

==== Group F ====
1 February 2026
18:00

Criciúma	1–2	Chapecoense
Waguininho 73'	Report	Everton 16'; Marcinho 34'

Estádio Heriberto Hülse, Criciúma
Attendance: 8,353
Referee: Rodrigo D'Alonso Ferreira

8 February 2026
19:00

Chapecoense	0–0	Criciúma

Arena Condá, Chapecó
Referee: Júlio César Pfleger

Chapecoense qualified for the semi-finals.

=== Semi-finals ===
Team 1	Agg.	Team 2	1st leg	2nd leg
Brusque	1–3	Chapecoense	1–0	0–3
Camboriú	1–4	Barra	1–1	0–3

==== Group H ====
14 February 2026
16:30

Brusque	1–0	Chapecoense
João Prado 45+3'

Arena Simon, Brusque
Referee: Bráulio da Silva Machado

22 February 2026
18:00

Chapecoense	3–0	Brusque
Jean Carlos 45'; Clar 50'; Higor Meritão 90+5'

Arena Condá, Chapecó
Referee: Rodrigo D'Alonso Ferreira

Chapecoense qualified for the finals.

==== Group I ====
15 February 2026
17:00

Camboriú	1–1	Barra
Kaká 78'		Geovany Soares 18'

Estádio Orlando Scarpelli, Florianópolis
Referee: Ramon Abatti

21 February 2026
19:00

Barra	3–0	Camboriú
Gabriel Silva 27'; Lucas Vargas 77'; Elvinho 90+1'

Arena Barra FC, Itajaí
Referee: Diego da Costa Cidral

Barra qualified for the finals.

=== Finals ===
Team 1	Agg.	Team 2	1st leg	2nd leg
Barra	3–2	Chapecoense	3–1	0–1

==== Group O ====
1 March 2026
18:00

Barra	3–1	Chapecoense
Elvinho 20'; Renan Bernabé 29'; Gabriel Silva 65'		João Vitor 89'

Arena Barra FC, Itajaí
Referee: Júlio César Pfleger

Barra	Chapecoense

GK	1	(Brazil) Ewerton
DF	2	(Brazil) Fábio
DF	3	(Brazil) Jean Pierre (c)
DF	4	(Brazil) Éverton Alemão
DF	6	(Brazil) Da Rocha
MF	8	(Brazil) Henrique Freitas		(substituted off) 81'
MF	5	(Brazil) Tetê
MF	10	(Brazil) Elvinho	(yellow card) 20'	(substituted off) 75'
FW	7	(Brazil) Gabriel Silva		(substituted off) 71'
FW	9	(Brazil) Renan Bernabé		(substituted off) 75'
FW	11	(Brazil) Geovany Soares		(substituted off) 81'
Substitutes:
GK	12	(Brazil) Fabian Volpi
DF	13	(Brazil) Vitão
DF	14	(Brazil) Vavá França
MF	15	(Brazil) Pablo Gabriel
MF	16	(Brazil) Péricles
MF	18	(Brazil) Warley		(substituted on) 75'
MF	24	(Brazil) Barba		(substituted on) 81'
FW	17	(Brazil) Cléo Silva		(substituted on) 71'
FW	19	(Brazil) Saymon		(substituted on) 81'
FW	20	(Brazil) Marcelinho
FW	21	(Brazil) Nicolas
FW	23	(Brazil) Lucas Vargas		(substituted on) 75'
Coach:
(Brazil) Eduardo Souza

GK	12	(Brazil) Léo Vieira
DF	25	(Brazil) Victor Caetano		(substituted off) 72'
DF	33	(Brazil) Bruno Leonardo (c)	(yellow card) 64'
DF	3	(Brazil) Eduardo Doma
DF	37	(Paraguay) Walter Clar
MF	27	(Brazil) Camilo Reijers
MF	99	(Brazil) Rafael Carvalheira
MF	20	(Brazil) Jean Carlos		(substituted off) 84'
FW	7	(Brazil) Marcinho	(yellow card) 53'	(substituted off) 60'
FW	77	(Brazil) Ítalo Vargas		(substituted off) 84'
FW	18	(Brazil) Neto Pessoa		(substituted off) 60'
Substitutes:
GK	1	(Brazil) Rafael Santos
DF	2	(Brazil) Marcos Vinícius		(substituted on) 84'
DF	4	(Brazil) João Paulo
DF	21	(Brazil) Kauan Faria	(red card) 79'	(substituted on) 72'
DF	91	(Brazil) Bruno Pacheco
MF	5	(Brazil) João Vitor		(substituted on) 84'
MF	19	(Brazil) David
MF	22	(Brazil) Higor Meritão
MF	97	(Brazil) Ênio
FW	9	(Brazil) Pedro Perotti		(substituted on) 60'
FW	70	(Brazil) Rubens		(substituted on) 60'
FW	90	(Brazil) Mailson
Coach:
(Brazil) Gilmar Dal Pozzo

Assistant referees:
Henrique Neu Ribeiro
Bruno Muller
Fourth official:
Fernando Henrique de Medeiros Miranda
Fifth official:
Deise Genoefa Bellaver
Video assistant referee:
Rafael Traci
Assistant video assistant referees:
Helton Nunes
Diego da Costa Cidral

8 March 2026
18:00

Chapecoense	1–0	Barra
Jean Carlos 88'

Arena Condá, Chapecó
Referee: Ramon Abatti

Chapecoense	Barra

GK	12	(Brazil) Léo Vieira
DF	26	(Brazil) Everton		(substituted off) 61'
DF	25	(Brazil) Victor Caetano
DF	3	(Brazil) Eduardo Doma
DF	37	(Paraguay) Walter Clar
MF	27	(Brazil) Camilo Reijers	(yellow card) 21'
MF	22	(Brazil) Higor Meritão		(substituted off) 62'
MF	99	(Brazil) Rafael Carvalheira
MF	10	(Brazil) Giovanni Augusto (c)		(substituted off) 68'
FW	77	(Brazil) Ítalo Vargas		(substituted off) 46'
FW	18	(Brazil) Neto Pessoa		(substituted off) 46'
Substitutes:
GK	1	(Brazil) Rafael Santos
DF	4	(Brazil) João Paulo
DF	15	(Brazil) Rafael Thyere
DF	91	(Brazil) Bruno Pacheco
MF	5	(Brazil) João Vitor
MF	19	(Brazil) David
MF	20	(Brazil) Jean Carlos		(substituted on) 61'
MF	97	(Brazil) Ênio
FW	7	(Brazil) Marcinho	(yellow card) 46'	(substituted on) 46'
FW	9	(Brazil) Pedro Perotti		(substituted on) 46'
FW	11	(Democratic Republic of the Congo) Yannick Bolasie		(substituted on) 68'
FW	70	(Brazil) Rubens		(substituted on) 62'
Coach:
(Brazil) Gilmar Dal Pozzo

GK	1	(Brazil) Ewerton
DF	2	(Brazil) Fábio
DF	3	(Brazil) Jean Pierre (c)
DF	4	(Brazil) Éverton Alemão
DF	6	(Brazil) Da Rocha	(yellow card) 90+1'
MF	8	(Brazil) Henrique Freitas		(substituted off) 62'
MF	5	(Brazil) Tetê
MF	10	(Brazil) Elvinho	(yellow card) 14'	(substituted off) 15'
FW	7	(Brazil) Gabriel Silva		(substituted off) 71'
FW	9	(Brazil) Renan Bernabé		(substituted off) 62'
FW	11	(Brazil) Geovany Soares		(substituted off) 72'
Substitutes:
GK	12	(Brazil) Fabian Volpi
DF	13	(Brazil) Vitão
DF	14	(Brazil) Vavá França
MF	15	(Brazil) Pablo Gabriel		(substituted on) 62'
MF	16	(Brazil) Péricles		(substituted on) 72'
MF	18	(Brazil) Warley
MF	24	(Brazil) Barba
FW	17	(Brazil) Cléo Silva		(substituted on) 15'
FW	19	(Brazil) Saymon
FW	20	(Brazil) Marcelinho		(substituted on) 71'
FW	21	(Brazil) Nicolas
FW	23	(Brazil) Lucas Vargas	(yellow card) 90+7'	(substituted on) 62'
Coach:
(Brazil) Eduardo Souza

Assistant referees:
Diogo Berndt
Hector Andrew Lisboa Jacques
Fourth official:
Luiz Augusto Silveira Tisne
Fifth official:
Aline Risso
Video assistant referee:
Rodrigo D'Alonso Ferreira
Assistant video assistant referees:
Helton Nunes
Fernando Henrique de Medeiros Miranda

== Taça ACESC 70 anos ==
The Taça ACESC 70 anos will determine third place in the tournament. The winners will qualify for the 2027 Copa do Brasil. The teams will compete in a single-elimination tournament. If tied on aggregate, the penalty shoot-out will be used to determine the winners.

The play-offs were played on a home-and-away, two-legged basis. The semi-finals were played as a single match, and the number of matches in the final will depend on whether the finalists are participating in the 2026 Copa do Brasil. The higher-seeded team will host the second leg of the two-legged fixture and the only leg of the one-legged fixture.

=== Play-offs ===
Team 1	Agg.	Team 2	1st leg	2nd leg
Concórdia	2–6	Criciúma	2–2	0–4
Santa Catarina	1–5	Avaí	1–2	0–3

=== Semi-finals ===
Team 1	Score	Team 2
Brusque	0–1	Criciúma
Camboriú	1–0	Avaí

=== Finals ===
Team 1	Agg.	Team 2	1st leg	2nd leg
Camboriú	3–3 (7–8 p)	Criciúma	1–0	2–3

==== Group N ====
4 March 2026
20:00

Camboriú	1–0	Criciúma
Danilo Mendes 55'

Estádio Orlando Scarpelli, Florianópolis

7 March 2026
18:00

Criciúma	3–2	Camboriú
Waguininho 22'; Jhonata Robert 54'; Jean Irmer 82'		Wermeson 13' (pen.); Mansur 58'
Penalties
Jhonata Robert (penalty scored); Marcinho (penalty missed); Jean Irmer (penalty scored); João Carlos (penalty scored); Waguininho (penalty missed); Luciano Castán (penalty scored); Marcelo Hermes (penalty scored); Thales (penalty scored); Ruan Carvalho (penalty scored); Alisson (penalty missed); Jhonata Robert (penalty scored)	8–7	(penalty missed) Wermeson; (penalty scored) Kaká; (penalty missed) Nádson; (penalty scored) Danilo Mendes; (penalty scored) Macías; (penalty scored) Matheuzinho; (penalty scored) Matheus Belém; (penalty scored) Alysson Dutra; (penalty scored) Silva; (penalty missed) Vavá; (penalty missed) Wermeson

Estádio Heriberto Hülse, Criciúma

== Relegation stage ==
The relegation stage was played in a round-robin format. Once this stage was complete, the three clubs with the fewest points were relegated to the 2027 Série B. Since Figueirense had the highest ranking among fifth-place clubs in the first stage, they started the relegation stage with an extra point.

=== Group G ===
Pos	Team	Pld	W	D	L	GF	GA	GD	Pts	Relegation	MAR	CAR	FIG	JOI
1	Marcílio Dias	6	4	1	1	10	5	+5	13			1–1	1–0	2–0
2	Carlos Renaux	6	4	1	1	10	8	+2	13	Relegation to Série B	2–1		1–0	2–1
3	Figueirense	6	2	0	4	6	7	−1	7	Relegation to Série B	0–1	2–4		1–0
4	Joinville	6	1	0	5	6	12	−6	3	Relegation to Série B	2–4	3–0	0–3	

Source: FCF

== Overall table ==
Pos	Team	Pld	W	D	L	GF	GA	GD	Pts	Qualification or relegation
1	Barra	6	3	0	3	8	5	+3	9	Champions and 2027 Copa do Brasil
2	Chapecoense	6	3	2	1	11	5	+6	11	Runners-up and 2027 Copa do Brasil
3	Criciúma	6	3	2	1	10	8	+2	11	2027 Copa do Brasil
4	Camboriú	6	2	3	1	8	6	+2	9	2027 Série D
5	Brusque	6	3	3	0	9	6	+3	12	
6	Avaí	6	3	1	2	8	7	+1	10	
7	Santa Catarina	6	3	3	0	10	5	+5	12	2027 Série D
8	Concórdia	6	2	1	3	5	10	−5	7	
9	Marcílio Dias	6	2	0	4	6	6	0	6	
10	Carlos Renaux	6	1	1	4	4	8	−4	4	Relegation to 2027 Catarinense Série B
11	Figueirense	6	2	1	3	6	8	−2	7	Relegation to 2027 Catarinense Série B
12	Joinville	6	0	1	5	3	14	−11	1	Relegation to 2027 Catarinense Série B

Source: FCF
