= 2025 Santa Cruz Futebol Clube season =

Santa Cruz
2025 season
- Chairman: Bruno Rodrigues
- Manager: Itamar Schulle; Marcelo Cabo
- Stadium: Estádio do Arruda; Arena Pernambuco
- Série D: Runners-up (Promoted)
- Pernambucano: Semi-finals
- Copa do Nordeste: Preliminary round
- Top goalscorer: League: Thiago Galhardo (7); All: Thiaguinho (9)
| Home colours | Away colours | Third colours |

The 2025 season was Santa Cruz's 112th season in the club's history. Santa Cruz competed in the Campeonato Pernambucano, Copa do Nordeste and Série D.

== Statistics ==
=== Overall ===
| Games played | 38 (11 Pernambucano, 1 Copa do Nordeste, 24 Série D, 2 Friendlies) |
| Games won | 17 (6 Pernambucano, 0 Copa do Nordeste, 11 Série D, 0 Friendlies) |
| Games drawn | 10 (2 Pernambucano, 0 Copa do Nordeste, 8 Série D, 0 Friendlies) |
| Games lost | 11 (3 Pernambucano, 1 Copa do Nordeste, 5 Série D, 2 Friendlies) |
| Goals scored | 43 |
| Goals conceded | 29 |
| Goal difference | +14 |
| Best result (goal difference) | 4–0 (A) v Jaguar – Pernambucano – 2025.02.07; 4–0 (H) v Horizonte – Série D – 2025.04.27 |
| Worst result (goal difference) | 1–3 (A) v Ferroviário – Série D – 2025.06.08 |
| Top scorer | Thiaguinho (9) |

Source: Santa Cruz FC official website

=== Goalscorers ===
| Place | Position | Nationality | Number | Name | Copa do Nordeste | Campeonato Pernambucano | Série D | Total |
|---|---|---|---|---|---|---|---|---|
| 1 | FW | (Brazil) | 17 | Thiaguinho | 1 | 4 | 4 | 9 |
| 2 | FW | (Brazil) | 9 | Thiago Galhardo | 0 | 0 | 7 | 7 |
| 3 | FW | (Brazil) | 11 | Geovany | 0 | 0 | 5 | 5 |
| 4 | DF | (Brazil) | 15 | Israel | 0 | 1 | 2 | 3 |
| 4 | MF | (Brazil) | 7 | João Pedro | 0 | 3 | 0 | 3 |
| 4 | MF | (Brazil) | 10 | Matheus Melo | 0 | 3 | 0 | 3 |
| 4 | MF | (Brazil) | 21 | Renato | 0 | 0 | 3 | 3 |
| 5 | DF | (Brazil) | 4 | William Alves | 0 | 0 | 2 | 2 |
| 6 | FW | (Argentina) | 37 | Ariel Nahuelpán | 0 | 0 | 1 | 1 |
| 6 | FW | (Brazil) | 16 | Douglas Skilo | 0 | 1 | 0 | 1 |
| 6 | DF | (Brazil) | 3 | Eurico | 0 | 0 | 1 | 1 |
| 6 | FW | (Brazil) | 29 | Everton Felipe | 0 | 1 | 0 | 1 |
| 6 | MF | (Brazil) | 5 | Lucas Siqueira | 0 | 1 | 0 | 1 |
| 6 | MF | (Brazil) | 8 | Wagner Balotelli | 0 | 0 | 1 | 1 |
| 6 | MF | (Brazil) | 10 | Willian Júnior | 0 | 0 | 1 | 1 |
| | | | | Own goals | 0 | 0 | 1 | 1 |
| | | | | Total | 1 | 14 | 28 | 43 |

=== Managers performance ===
| Name | From | To | P | W | D | L | GF | GA | Avg% | Ref |
|---|---|---|---|---|---|---|---|---|---|---|
| (Brazil) Itamar Schulle | 4 January 2025 | 29 March 2025 | 13 | 6 | 2 | 5 | 15 | 11 | 51% | |
| (Brazil) Marcelo Cabo | 5 April 2025 | 4 October 2025 | 25 | 11 | 8 | 6 | 28 | 18 | 54% | |

== Friendlies ==
| 29 March 2025 | ASA | 2–0 | Santa Cruz | Arapiraca |
| 17:00 (UTC-3) | Junior Viçosa 18'; Otávio 46' | Report | | Stadium: Estádio Municipal Coaracy da Mata Fonseca; Referee: Gean Pereira |

| 5 April 2025 | Santa Cruz | 0–1 | ABC | Recife |
| 16:00 (UTC-3) | | Report | Islan 80' | Stadium: Estádio José do Rego Maciel (Arruda); Attendance: 5,135 |

== Official Competitions ==
=== Copa do Nordeste ===
==== Preliminary round ====
| 4 January 2025 | Santa Cruz | 1–2 | Treze | Recife |
| 16:00 (UTC-3) | Thiaguinho 56' | Report | Wandson 34'; Van 69' | Stadium: Estádio José do Rego Maciel (Arruda); Attendance: 20,518; Referee: Antonio Dib Moraes De Sousa |

==== Record ====
| Final Position | Points | Matches | Wins | Draws | Losses | Goals For | Goals Away | Avg% |
|---|---|---|---|---|---|---|---|---|
| N/A | 0 | 1 | 0 | 0 | 1 | 1 | 2 | 0% |

=== Campeonato Pernambucano ===
==== First stage ====
| 11 January 2025 1 | Decisão | 1–1 | Santa Cruz | Sertânia |
| 16:00 (UTC-3) | Gilmar Pitimbu 4' | Report | João Pedro 73' | Stadium: Estádio Municipal Odilon Ferreira dos Santos; Attendance: 1,214; Referee: Anderson Marques |

| 16 January 2025 2 | Santa Cruz | 2–0 | Petrolina | Recife |
| 20:00 (UTC-3) | João Pedro 9'; Thiaguinho 51' | Report | | Stadium: Estádio José do Rego Maciel (Arruda); Attendance: 24,001; Referee: Diego Fernando |

| 19 January 2025 3 | Santa Cruz | 2–0 | Afogados da Ingazeira | Recife |
| 16:00 (UTC-3) | Thiaguinho 21'; Matheus Melo 70' | Report | | Stadium: Estádio José do Rego Maciel (Arruda); Attendance: 26,284; Referee: Hugo Figueiredo |

| 25 January 2025 4 | Náutico | 2–1 | Santa Cruz | Recife |
| 16:30 (UTC-3) | Patrick Allan 27'; Paulo Sérgio 76' | Report | Thiaguinho 28' | Stadium: Estádio Eládio de Barros Carvalho (Aflitos); Attendance: 13,128; Referee: Deborah Cecilia Cruz Correia |

| 28 January 2025 5 | Santa Cruz | 1–0 | Retrô | Recife |
| 20:00 (UTC-3) | Israel 83' | Report | | Stadium: Estádio José do Rego Maciel (Arruda); Attendance: 19,512; Referee: Nairon Pereira de Lira |

| 1 February 2025 6 | Santa Cruz | 1–0 | Sport | Recife |
| 16:30 (UTC-3) | Douglas Skilo 85' | Report | | Stadium: Estádio José do Rego Maciel (Arruda); Attendance: 27,506; Referee: Rodrigo Klein |

| 7 February 2025 7 | Jaguar | 0–4 | Santa Cruz | São Lourenço da Mata |
| 20:00 (UTC-3) | | Report | Thiaguinho 1'; João Pedro 12'; Lucas Siqueira 16'; Matheus Melo 90+3' | Stadium: Estádio Governador Carlos Wilson Campos (Arena Pernambuco); Attendance: 4,726; Referee: Michelangelo Martins de Almeida Junior |

| 16 February 2025 8 | Santa Cruz | 2–1 | Central | Recife |
| 16:00 (UTC-3) | Matheus Melo 58' (pen.); Everton Felipe 81' | Report | Moacir 50' (pen.) | Stadium: Estádio José do Rego Maciel (Arruda); Attendance: 25,014; Referee: Hugo Dias Figueiredo |

| 22 February 2025 9 | Maguary | 0–0 | Santa Cruz | São Lourenço da Mata |
| 16:30 (UTC-3) | | Report | | Stadium: Estádio Governador Carlos Wilson Campos (Arena Pernambuco); Attendance: 7,806; Referee: Diego Fernando |

==== Semi-finals ====
| 8 March 2025 | Sport | 2–0 | Santa Cruz | Recife |
| 16:30 (UTC-3) | Paciência 28'; Silva 70' | Report | | Stadium: Estádio Adelmar da Costa Carvalho (Ilha do Retiro); Attendance: 18,044; Referee: Rodrigo José Pereira de Lima |

| 15 March 2025 | Santa Cruz | 0–1 | Sport | Recife |
| 16:30 (UTC-3) | | Report | Domínguez 67' | Stadium: Estádio José do Rego Maciel (Arruda); Attendance: 30,025; Referee: Anderson Daronco |

==== Record ====
| Final Position | Points | Matches | Wins | Draws | Losses | Goals For | Goals Away | Avg% |
|---|---|---|---|---|---|---|---|---|
| 3rd | 20 | 11 | 6 | 2 | 3 | 14 | 7 | 60% |

=== Série D ===
==== Group stage ====
| 20 April 2025 1 | Treze | 0–1 | Santa Cruz | Campina Grande |
| 16:00 (UTC-3) | | Report | Israel 83' | Stadium: Estádio Governador Ernani Sátyro (Amigão); Attendance: 4,902; Referee: Rafael Carlos Salgueiro Lima |

| 27 April 2025 2 | Santa Cruz | 4–0 | Horizonte | Recife |
| 17:00 (UTC-3) | Thiago Galhardo 13' (pen.); Israel 18'; Willian Júnior 47'; Geovany 56' | Report | | Stadium: Estádio José do Rego Maciel (Arruda); Attendance: 27,019; Referee: Michael Vinicius Santos Freitas |

| 3 May 2025 3 | Santa Cruz de Natal | 0–0 | Santa Cruz | Goianinha |
| 15:00 (UTC-3) | | Report | | Stadium: Estádio José Nazareno do Nascimento; Attendance: 1,410; Referee: Raimundo Rodrigues de Oliveira Junior |

| 9 May 2025 4 | Santa Cruz | 2–1 | América de Natal | Recife |
| 20:00 (UTC-3) | Thiago Galhardo 23', 41' | Report | Souza 54' | Stadium: Estádio José do Rego Maciel (Arruda); Attendance: 26,122; Referee: Leo Simão Holanda |

| 18 May 2025 5 | Central | 1–2 | Santa Cruz | Caruaru |
| 16:00 (UTC-3) | Kauê 53' | Report | Geovany 39'; Thiaguinho 49' | Stadium: Estádio Luiz José de Lacerda (Lacerdão); Attendance: 9,118; Referee: José Woshington da Silva |

| 25 May 2025 6 | Sousa | 0–1 | Santa Cruz | Sousa |
| 16:30 (UTC-3) | | Report | Geovany 45+3' | Stadium: Estádio Governador Antônio Mariz; Attendance: 971; Referee: Marcel Phillipe Santos Martins |

| 1 June 2025 7 | Santa Cruz | 3–1 | Ferroviário | Recife |
| 17:00 (UTC-3) | Thiaguinho 27', 69'; Geovany 85' | Report | Kevin Rivas 71' | Stadium: Estádio José do Rego Maciel (Arruda); Attendance: 30,025; Referee: Bruno Nogueira Prado |

| 8 June 2025 8 | Ferroviário | 3–1 | Santa Cruz | Fortaleza |
| 17:30 (UTC-3) | Ciel 16', 73'; João Neto 90' | Report | Thiago Galhardo 12' | Stadium: Estádio Presidente Vargas; Attendance: 1,226; Referee: Wiomar Santana de Oliveira |

| 15 June 2025 9 | Santa Cruz | 2–0 | Sousa | Recife |
| 17:00 (UTC-3) | Thiago Galhardo 14' (pen.); Thiaguinho 24' | Report | | Stadium: Estádio José do Rego Maciel (Arruda); Attendance: 16,903; Referee: Josué Reis de Jesus Júnior |

| 29 June 2025 10 | Santa Cruz | 0–1 | Central | Recife |
| 17:00 (UTC-3) | | Report | Zé Artur 78' | Stadium: Estádio José do Rego Maciel (Arruda); Attendance: 14,384; Referee: Diego Fernando Silva de Lima |

| 6 July 2025 11 | América de Natal | 0–0 | Santa Cruz | Natal |
| 16:30 (UTC-3) | | Report | | Stadium: Arena das Dunas; Attendance: 12,356; Referee: Emerson Ricardo de Almeida Andrade |

| 13 July 2025 12 | Santa Cruz | 1–1 | Santa Cruz de Natal | Recife |
| 17:00 (UTC-3) | Thiago Galhardo 90+5' (pen.) | Report | Eduardo Brito 13' | Stadium: Estádio José do Rego Maciel (Arruda); Attendance: 8,003; Referee: Emerson Souza |

| 20 July 2025 13 | Horizonte | 2–0 | Santa Cruz | Horizonte |
| 16:00 (UTC-3) | Claudivan 38'; Weberth 44' | Report | | Stadium: Estádio Olímpico Horácio Domingos de Sousa (Domingão); Attendance: 703; Referee: Marcel Phillipe Santos Martins |

| 27 July 2025 14 | Santa Cruz | 3–0 | Treze | São Lourenço da Mata |
| 16:00 (UTC-3) | Renato 27'; Eurico 36'; William Alves 47' | Report | | Stadium: Estádio Governador Carlos Wilson Campos (Arena Pernambuco); Attendance: 10,103; Referee: Mayron Frederico dos Reis Novais |

==== Second stage ====
| 3 August 2025 | Sergipe | 2–1 | Santa Cruz | Aracaju |
| 17:00 (UTC-3) | Matheus Sacramento 7'; Rickelme 47' | Report | Geovany 29' | Stadium: Estádio Lourival Baptista (Batistão); Attendance: 8,258; Referee: Márcio dos Santos Oliveira |

| 9 August 2025 | Santa Cruz | 2–1 (5–4 p) | Sergipe | São Lourenço da Mata |
| 17:00 (UTC-3) | Mateus Henrique 2' (o.g.); Thiago Galhardo 56' | Report | Felipe Pará 64' | Stadium: Estádio Governador Carlos Wilson Campos (Arena Pernambuco); Attendance: 35,882; Referee: Paulo José Souza Mourão |
| | Penalties |
| | Thiago Galhardo (penalty scored); Ariel (penalty missed); Renato (penalty scored); Eurico (penalty missed); Wagner Balotelli (penalty scored); Thiaguinho (penalty scored); Pedro Favela (penalty scored) | | (penalty missed) Felipe Pará; (penalty scored) Matheus Sacramento; (penalty missed) Ericson; (penalty scored) Pedro Santos; (penalty scored) Luan; (penalty scored) Jefferson; (penalty missed) Moisés Ribeiro |

==== Round of 16 ====
| 18 August 2025 | Santa Cruz | 1–1 | Altos | São Lourenço da Mata |
| 21:00 (UTC-3) | William Alves 10' | Report | Mikael 74' | Stadium: Estádio Governador Carlos Wilson Campos (Arena Pernambuco); Attendance: 42,653; Referee: José Mendonça da Silva Junior |

| 24 August 2025 | Altos | 0–0 (1–3 p) | Santa Cruz | Teresina |
| 18:00 (UTC-3) | | Report | | Stadium: Estádio Lindolfo Monteiro; Attendance: 2,500; Referee: André Luiz Skettino Policarpo Bento |
| | Penalties |
| | Esquerdinha (penalty missed); Jonathan (penalty missed); Digão (penalty scored); Leandro Amorim (penalty missed) | | (penalty scored) Renato; (penalty scored) Geovany; (penalty missed) João Pedro; (penalty scored) Wagner Balotelli |

==== Quarter-finals ====
| 30 August 2025 | Santa Cruz | 1–0 | América de Natal | São Lourenço da Mata |
| 19:00 (UTC-3) | Ariel 87' | Report | | Stadium: Estádio Governador Carlos Wilson Campos (Arena Pernambuco); Attendance: 40,505; Referee: Rafael Rodrigo Klein |

| 7 September 2025 | América de Natal | 1–1 | Santa Cruz | Natal |
| 19:00 (UTC-3) | Aruá 48' | Report | Wagner Balotelli 81' | Stadium: Arena das Dunas; Attendance: 29,807; Referee: Ramon Abatti Abel |

==== Semi-finals ====
| 14 September 2025 | Maranhão | 0–1 | Santa Cruz | São Luís |
| 16:00 (UTC-3) | | Report | Renato 78' | Stadium: Estádio Governador João Castelo (Castelão); Attendance: 6,062; Referee: João Vitor Gobi |

| 20 September 2025 | Santa Cruz | 0–0 | Maranhão | São Lourenço da Mata |
| 19:30 (UTC-3) | | Report | | Stadium: Estádio Governador Carlos Wilson Campos (Arena Pernambuco); Attendance: 40,892; Referee: Léo Simão Holanda |

==== Finals ====
| 27 September 2025 | Santa Cruz | 1–2 | Barra | São Lourenço da Mata |
| 17:00 (UTC-3) | Renato 33' | Report | Elvinho 37'; Renan Bernabé 61' | Stadium: Estádio Governador Carlos Wilson Campos (Arena Pernambuco); Attendance: 45,500; Referee: Fernando Antonio Mendes de Salles Nascimento Filho |

| 4 October 2025 | Barra | 0–0 | Santa Cruz | Itajaí |
| 16:00 (UTC-3) | | Report | | Stadium: Arena Barra Futebol Clube; Attendance: 5,238; Referee: Alex Gomes Stefano |

==== Record ====
| Final Position | Points | Matches | Wins | Draws | Losses | Goals For | Goals Away | Avg% |
|---|---|---|---|---|---|---|---|---|
| 2nd | 41 | 24 | 11 | 8 | 5 | 28 | 17 | 57% |
