= Ewerton (footballer, born 1998) =

Brazilian footballer (born 1998)

Personal information
- Full name: Ewerton Ferreira da Silva
- Date of birth: 7 May 1998 (age 28)
- Place of birth: Santo Antônio, Brazil
- Height: 1.90 m (6 ft 3 in)
- Position: Goalkeeper

Team information
- Current team: Académico de Viseu (on loan from Barra-SC)
- Number: 98

Youth career
- 2016–2018: América de Natal

Senior career*
Years	Team	Apps	(Gls)
2016–2023	América de Natal	48	(0)
2021	→ CRB (loan)	0	(0)
2022	→ Confiança do Sergipe (loan)	22	(0)
2023	→ Barra-SC (loan)	15	(0)
2024–	Barra-SC	83	(0)
2026–	→ Académico de Viseu (loan)	11	(0)
- * Club domestic league appearances and goals as of 23:41, 12 November 2026 (UTC)

Ewerton Ferreira da Silva (born 7 May 1998), known as Ewerton, is a Brazilian professional footballer who plays as a goalkeeper for Portuguese club Académico de Viseu, on loan from Barra-SC.

He began his career with América de Natal, where he won the Campeonato Potiguar in 2019 and 2023. He has made over 100 appearances for Barra-SC, winning the Campeonato Brasileiro Série C in 2025 and the Campeonato Catarinense in 2026.

== Career ==
=== América de Natal ===
Born in Santo Antônio in the state of Rio Grande do Norte, Ewerton began playing for América de Natal in his home state. When the other two goalkeepers were injured, he made his debut in the Campeonato Brasileiro Série C on 13 August 2016 in a 2–0 home win over Salgueiro for his only appearance of the season, but spent the next two years largely in the under-20 team. After Glédson moved to Avaí, he was the starting goalkeeper for 2019, and his side won the Campeonato Potiguar, defeating ABC 2–1 in the final on 25 April.

In 2020, Ewerton played 33 games for América across all competitions, despite losing his place to Vitor Paiva at various points in the year. On 12 February 2021, he was loaned to CRB under former América manager Roberto Fernandes, but had no opportunities. He was loaned the following year to Confiança do Sergipe, a team relying on such deals due to budget issues. For the start of 2023, he moved on the same basis to Barra-SC, where he played 15 games in a run to the semi-finals of the Campeonato Catarinense after eliminating Chapecoense.

Ewerton returned to América de Natal for the final of the 2023 Campeonato Potiguar, playing in the 1–0 first-leg win at home to ABC on 11 May. Bruno Pianissolla played the goalless draw a week later that won the title.

=== Barra-SC ===
In 2024, Ewerton moved permanently to Barra. On 21 March, after a 2–1 home win over Criciúma in the semi-finals of the Campeonato Catarinense, he was punched in the chest by his teammate Natan Costa, who was sent off. The team won Campeonato Brasileiro Série D in 2025, defeating Santa Cruz 2–1 on aggregate in the final for their first national title.

Barra won the 2026 Campeonato Catarinense, their first title in the competition. Ewerton kept a clean sheet in four out of 12 games, conceded the fewest goals, and was man of the match in the final victory over Chapecoense; he saved four penalty kicks during the season. In the third and fourth rounds of the Copa do Brasil in March, he kept América Mineiro and Volta Redonda to goalless draws before defeating them on penalties. On 10 May, in a goalless home draw against Caxias, he made his 100th appearance for the club and 40th without conceding.

On 23 July 2026, Ewerton moved abroad for the first time, joining newly promoted Primeira Liga club Académico de Viseu in Portugal. He made his national top-flight debut on 9 August in his team's first such game for 37 years, a 2–2 draw away to Benfica. He was voted the league's Goalkeeper of the month for September/October, having kept two clean sheets and conceded three goals in five appearances; he was level with votes with Diogo Costa, but surpassed the Porto goalkeeper due to playing more minutes.

== Honours ==
América de Natal

- Campeonato Potiguar: 2019, 2023

Barra-SC

- Campeonato Brasileiro Série D: 2025
- Campeonato Catarinense: 2026
