= Eduardo Souza (football manager) =

Brazilian football coach (born 1980)

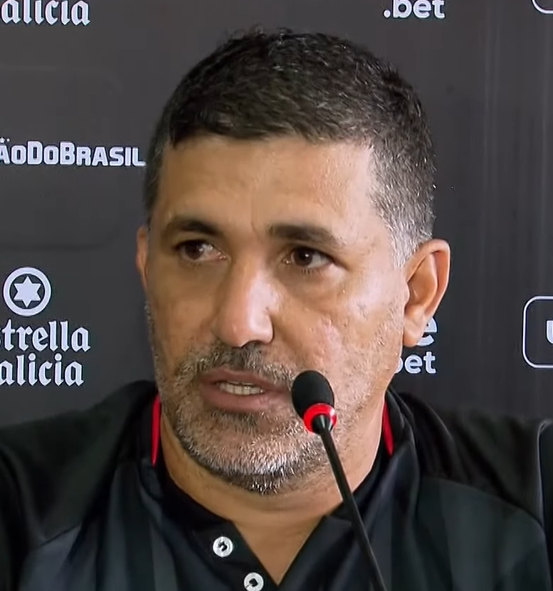
- Souza in 2023

Personal information
- Full name: Eduardo do Nascimento Souza
- Date of birth: 1 January 1980 (age 46)
- Place of birth: Votuporanga, Brazil
- Position: Centre-back

Youth career
- Years: Team
- Santos
- –1999: Rio Branco-SP

Managerial career
- 2012: Ituano (assistant)
- 2012: CRB (assistant)
- 2013: Brasiliense (assistant)
- 2014: CRB (assistant)
- 2014: CRB
- 2014: Ituano (assistant)
- 2014: Atlético Paranaense (assistant)
- 2015: Vasco da Gama (assistant)
- 2015: Ponte Preta (assistant)
- 2015: São Paulo (assistant)
- 2016: Bahia (assistant)
- 2016: Santa Cruz (assistant)
- 2017: Atlético Goianiense (assistant)
- 2018: Novorizontino (assistant)
- 2018: Ponte Preta (assistant)
- 2018: CRB (assistant)
- 2019: Votuporanguense
- 2019–2021: Atlético Goianiense (assistant)
- 2019: Atlético Goianiense (interim)
- 2020: Atlético Goianiense (interim)
- 2020: Atlético Goianiense (interim)
- 2020: Atlético Goianiense (interim)
- 2021–2022: Atlético Goianiense (assistant)
- 2021: Atlético Goianiense (interim)
- 2021: Atlético Goianiense (interim)
- 2022: Atlético Goianiense (interim)
- 2022: Aparecidense
- 2022: Atlético Goianiense (assistant)
- 2022: Atlético Goianiense (interim)
- 2023: Atlético Goianiense
- 2023: Londrina
- 2024: Barra-SC
- 2024: Hercílio Luz
- 2025: Marcílio Dias
- 2025–2026: Barra-SC
- 2026: Atlético Goianiense

Eduardo do Nascimento Souza (born 1 January 1980), known as Eduardo Souza or Dorita, is a Brazilian football coach.

== Career ==
Born in Votuporanga, São Paulo, Souza played youth football as a central defender for Santos and Rio Branco-SP's youth categories before retiring at the age of 19. After graduating in Physical Education at the State University of Londrina in 2002, he started to work at Londrina's youth setup as a fitness coach, and was later promoted to the first team.

Souza then went on to work with Roberto Fonseca, always as a fitness coach. In December 2013, he joined CRB as Roberval Davino's assistant, and became the club's interim coach the following March after Davino's dismissal.

On 27 March 2014, Souza was confirmed as CRB head coach, but resigned on 18 May. He then joined Doriva's staff as his assistant at Ituano, Atlético Paranaense, Vasco da Gama, Ponte Preta (two stints), São Paulo, Bahia, Santa Cruz, Atlético Goianiense, Novorizontino and again CRB.

On 9 December 2018, Souza was named head coach of Votuporanguense, but was sacked the following 12 February after only seven matches. He subsequently returned to Atlético Goianiense as a permanent assistant coach of the main squad; in October, he was interim coach for one match (a 0–0 home draw against Ponte Preta) before the signing of Eduardo Barroca.

After the dismissal of Cristóvão Borges in February 2020, Souza was again named interim of Dragão until the appointment of Vagner Mancini. He was also an interim in one further occasion, between the tenures of Mancini and Marcelo Cabo, before leaving the club on 3 March 2021 for personal reasons.

In April 2021, Souza returned to Dragão, and was again named interim in May after Jorginho resigned. He became an interim again on 7 February 2022, after Cabo left, but he himself left the club fourteen days later, stating a "desire to become a full-time head coach".

On 9 March 2022, Souza replaced Thiago Carvalho at the helm of Série C side Aparecidense. He was himself dismissed on 6 June, with the club nearing the relegation zone.

Souza returned to Atlético on 28 August 2022, as an assistant of Eduardo Baptista, but was named interim coach on 29 September. On 13 November, despite the club's relegation, he was confirmed as manager for the upcoming season.

On 3 March 2023, despite having nine wins in 13 matches during the season, Souza was sacked by Atlético. On 3 July, he became Londrina's fifth permanent manager of the season, being also dismissed on 7 September.

On 13 December 2023, Souza was named head coach of Barra-SC for the upcoming season. Sacked on 26 March of the following year, he later took over Hercílio Luz on 30 April 2024, but resigned from the side on 3 November.

On 22 November 2024, Marcílio Dias announced Souza as their head coach for the ensuing campaign. He asked to leave the club the following 3 February, and returned to Barra hours later.

Souza won the 2025 Série D and the 2026 Campeonato Catarinense with the club, their first-ever national and state titles, respectively. On 10 March 2026, he left Barra to return to Atlético Goianiense, now as permanent head coach, but left by mutual consent on 14 June.

== Coaching statistics ==
As of 15 June 2026.

Coaching record by team and tenure
Team	Nat	From	To	Record								Ref
Team	Nat	From	To	G	W	D	L	GF	GA	GD	Win %	Ref
CRB	(Brazil)	2 March 2014	18 May 2014	18	8	4	6	21	18	+3	44.44	
Votuporanguense	(Brazil)	9 December 2018	12 February 2019	7	0	4	3	4	7	−3	0.00	
Atlético Goianiense (interim)	(Brazil)	12 October 2019	14 October 2019	1	0	1	0	0	0	+0	0.00	
Atlético Goianiense (interim)	(Brazil)	25 February 2020	25 June 2020	5	4	1	0	12	2	+10	80.00	
Atlético Goianiense (interim)	(Brazil)	12 October 2020	7 November 2020	7	1	2	4	5	10	−5	14.29	
Atlético Goianiense (Note: In charge of a reserve side during one match of the 2020 Campeonato Goiano and one match of the 2020 Copa Verde, as the main squad was involved in the Série A.)	(Brazil)	28 January 2021	7 February 2021	2	0	0	2	4	8	−4	0.00	
Atlético Goianiense (interim)	(Brazil)	15 May 2021	27 May 2021	2	0	2	0	1	1	+0	0.00	
Atlético Goianiense (interim)	(Brazil)	27 September 2021	11 November 2021	11	3	4	4	9	13	−4	27.27	
Atlético Goianiense (interim)	(Brazil)	7 February 2022	21 February 2022	4	3	0	1	6	3	+3	75.00	
Aparecidense	(Brazil)	9 March 2022	6 June 2022	11	3	3	5	11	12	−1	27.27	
Atlético Goianiense (interim)	(Brazil)	29 September 2022	13 November 2022	10	3	5	2	14	13	+1	30.00	
Atlético Goianiense	(Brazil)	13 November 2022	5 March 2023	13	9	2	2	26	13	+13	69.23	
Londrina	(Brazil)	3 July 2023	7 September 2023	12	2	3	7	8	17	−9	16.67	
Barra-SC	(Brazil)	13 December 2023	26 March 2024	15	7	2	6	22	16	+6	46.67	
Hercílio Luz	(Brazil)	30 April 2024	3 November 2024	22	9	11	2	24	15	+9	40.91	
Marcílio Dias	(Brazil)	22 November 2024	3 February 2025	6	1	3	2	3	4	−1	16.67	
Barra-SC	(Brazil)	3 February 2025	10 March 2026	40	21	9	10	52	29	+23	52.50	
Atlético Goianiense	(Brazil)	10 March 2026	14 June 2026	20	7	8	5	19	17	+2	35.00	
Total				206	81	64	61	241	198	+43	39.32	—

== Honours ==
Barra

- Campeonato Brasileiro Série D: 2025
- Campeonato Catarinense: 2026

Atlético Goianiense

- Campeonato Goiano runner-up: 2026
