= Gabriel Melo =

Brazilian footballer (born 2000)

Personal information
- Full name: Gabriel Couto Caetano de Melo
- Date of birth: 23 June 2000 (age 26)
- Place of birth: Brazil
- Height: 1.66 m (5 ft 5 in)
- Position: Winger

Youth career
- –2020: Barra

Senior career*
Years	Team	Apps	(Gls)
2020–2021	Ittihad Kalba	1	(0)
2021–2022	Dibba Al Fujairah		
2022–2024	Al Urooba		
- * Club domestic league appearances and goals as of 13:44, 28 December 2020 (UTC)

Gabriel Couto Caetano de Melo (born 23 June 2000), commonly known as Gabriel Melo, is a Brazilian footballer who plays as a winger.

== Career statistics ==
=== Club ===
As of 28 December 2020.

Club	Season	League			Cup		Continental		Other		Total	
Club	Season	Division	Apps	Goals	Apps	Goals	Apps	Goals	Apps	Goals	Apps	Goals
Al-Ittihad Kalba	2020–21	UAE Pro League	1	0	0	0	0	0	0	0	1	0
Career total			1	0	0	0	0	0	0	0	1	0
