= Ronaldy =

Brazilian footballer

Personal information
- Full name: Ronaldy Wyllian da Silva Santana
- Date of birth: 28 March 1997 (age 29)
- Place of birth: Rio de Janeiro, Brazil
- Height: 1.76 m (5 ft 9 in)
- Position: Forward

Team information
- Current team: ABC

Youth career
- 2016: Ceres
- 2017: America-RJ

Senior career*
Years	Team	Apps	(Gls)
2016	Ceres	4	(0)
2018	Barcelona-RJ	19	(4)
2019	Ceres	13	(5)
2020	Campo Grande	15	(12)
2021	Serranense	2	(0)
2021	Campo Grande	5	(0)
2022	Império Serrano	12	(4)
2022	Campo Grande	9	(1)
2023	Gonçalense	7	(2)
2023	Campo Grande	5	(1)
2024	Rio Branco-VN	7	(1)
2024	Bonsucesso	14	(2)
2025	São Francisco-PA	8	(2)
2025	→ Tuna Luso (loan)	16	(10)
2025–	ABC	3	(0)
- * Club domestic league appearances and goals as of 4 October 2025

Ronaldy Wyllian da Silva Santana (born 28 March 1997), simply known as Ronaldy, is a Brazilian professional footballer who plays as a forward for ABC.

== Career ==
Born in Rio de Janeiro, Ronaldy began his career playing in the state's lower leagues, playing for Ceres, America-RJ, Barcelona-RJ and Campo Grande. In 2024, he was runner-up in the Campeonato Capixaba with Rio Branco-VN, and in 2025, he transferred to Pará, where played in the Campeonato Paraense for São Francisco.

In March 2025, Ronaldy was loaned to Tuna Luso for the Série D, finishing the competition as the top scorer with 10 goals. Due to his inputs, he was acquired by Série C side ABC until the end of 2026.

== Honours ==
Ceres

- Campeonato Carioca Série B2: 2019

Individual

- 2025 Campeonato Brasileiro Série D top scorer: 10 goals
