= Léo Duarte (footballer, born 1999) =

Brazilian footballer

Personal information
- Full name: Leonardo da Silva Cruz Duarte
- Date of birth: 23 March 1999 (age 27)
- Place of birth: Salto, Brazil
- Height: 1.86 m (6 ft 1 in)
- Position: Right-back

Team information
- Current team: Barra-SC

Youth career
- 2014–2019: Ituano

Senior career*
Years	Team	Apps	(Gls)
2018–2021	Ituano	38	(2)
2021	→ XV de Piracicaba (loan)	15	(0)
2022–2023	Inter de Limeira	26	(0)
2022	→ Mirassol (loan)	23	(1)
2023	Vila Nova	29	(0)
2024	Ituano	27	(1)
2025	São Bernardo	4	(0)
2026–	Barra-SC	1	(0)
- * Club domestic league appearances and goals as of 10 November 2026

Leonardo da Silva Cruz Duarte (born 23 March 1999), known as Léo Duarte, is a Brazilian footballer who plays as a right-back for Barra-SC.

== Career ==
Léo Duarte was born in Salto, São Paulo, and joined Ituano's youth setup at the age of 14. He made his senior debut on 8 August 2018, starting in a 3–1 away loss to Nacional-SP, for the year's Copa Paulista.

On 3 February 2021, Léo Duarte was loaned to XV de Piracicaba until the end of the Campeonato Paulista Série A2. Upon returning, he started to feature more regularly for Ituano, and scored his first senior goal on 14 August, netting his team's second in a 2–2 home draw against São José-RS.

On 6 December 2021, Léo Duarte signed a contract with Inter de Limeira until the middle of 2023. On 7 April 2022, he was loaned to Mirassol until the end of the year.

On 29 March 2023, Léo Duarte signed for Série B side Vila Nova. After being a regular starter, he returned to Ituano on 18 December, with the club now also in the second division.

== Career statistics ==
As of 28 February 2024

Club	Season	League			State League		Cup		Continental		Other		Total	
Club	Season	Division	Apps	Goals	Apps	Goals	Apps	Goals	Apps	Goals	Apps	Goals	Apps	Goals
Ituano	2018	Paulista	—		—		—		—		1 (Note: Appearance(s) in Copa Paulista)	0	1	0
Ituano	2020	Série C	12	0	5	0	—		—		—		17	0
Ituano	2021	Série C	21	2	—		—		—		—		21	2
Ituano	Total		33	2	5	0	—		—		1	0	39	2
XV de Piracicaba (loan)	2021	Paulista A2	—		15	0	—		—		—		15	0
Inter de Limeira	2022	Série D	0	0	14	0	—		—		—		14	0
Inter de Limeira	2023	Série D	0	0	12	0	—		—		—		12	0
Inter de Limeira	Total		0	0	26	0	—		—		—		26	0
Mirassol (loan)	2022	Série C	23	1	—		—		—		—		23	1
Vila Nova	2023	Série B	29	0	—		—		—		—		29	0
Ituano	2024	Série B	0	0	9	1	1	0	—		—		10	1
Career total			85	3	55	1	1	0	0	0	1	0	142	4

== Honours ==
Ituano

- Campeonato Brasileiro Série C: 2021

Mirassol

- Campeonato Brasileiro Série C: 2022
