= Márcio Ribeiro =

Brazilian footballer

Personal information
- Full name: Márcio José Ribeiro e Silva
- Date of birth: 12 March 1957 (age 69)
- Place of birth: Palmeira d'Oeste, Brazil
- Position: Attacking midfielder

Team information
- Current team: Audax (head coach)

Senior career*
Years	Team	Apps	(Gls)
1976–1978	Botafogo-SP		
1977	→ Grêmio Maringá (loan)		
1981	Jalesense		
1983–1984	CRB		(19)
1984	Coritiba	23	(5)
1985	ABC		
1986	Próspera		
1986–1987	Treze		(1)
1987	Taubaté		
1988	Botafogo-PB		
1989	Santa Cruz-RS		
1990	Costa Rica		
- ASA

Managerial career
- 1995–1996: Taubaté
- 1998: XV de Piracicaba
- 1999–2000: Palestra São Bernardo
- 2001: Barretos
- 2001–2002: Taubaté
- 2002: XV de Piracicaba
- 2002: Barretos
- 2003: XV de Piracicaba
- 2003–2005: Ferroviária
- 2005: Guaratinguetá
- 2005: CSA
- 2005: América-SP
- 2005–2006: URT
- 2006: XV de Piracicaba
- 2006: União São João
- 2007: Bandeirante
- 2007: Botafogo-SP
- 2008: Bandeirante
- 2008: União São João
- 2008–2009: Taquaritinga
- 2009: Catanduvense
- 2009: Comercial-SP
- 2009–2010: Rio Preto
- 2010: América-SP
- 2010: Goiatuba
- 2010–2011: Goianésia
- 2011: Francana
- 2011–2012: União São João
- 2012: América-SP
- 2013–2016: Água Santa
- 2016: Portuguesa
- 2017: Barretos
- 2018–2019: Água Santa
- 2020: Anápolis
- 2020: Linense
- 2020: Costa Rica
- 2021: Bandeirante
- 2021: Matonense
- 2021: América-SP
- 2023: São Caetano
- 2023–: Audax
- * Club domestic league appearances and goals

Márcio José Ribeiro e Silva (born 12 March 1957), known as Márcio Ribeiro, is a Brazilian football coach and former player who played as an attacking midfielder. He is the current head coach of Audax.

Márcio Ribeiro spent his career mainly in charge of clubs in the São Paulo state before taking over Água Santa in 2013. With the club he achieved three consecutive promotions, and made his professional debut in 2016 Campeonato Paulista.

Márcio Ribeiro also had an unassuming spell at Portuguesa during the last months of 2016, suffering relegation to Série D. Back in 2005, he won the Campeonato Alagoano while in charge of CSA.

== Honours ==
=== Club ===
CRB

- Campeonato Alagoano: 1983

=== Manager ===
CSA

- Campeonato Alagoano: 2005

=== Individual ===
- Campeonato Alagoano top goalscorer: 1983
