= Neto Volpi =

Brazilian footballer

Personal information
- Full name: Alvino Volpi Neto
- Date of birth: 1 August 1992 (age 34)
- Place of birth: Rio do Campo, Brazil
- Height: 1.89 m (6 ft 2 in)
- Position: Goalkeeper

Team information
- Current team: Deportes Tolima
- Number: 35

Senior career*
Years	Team	Apps	(Gls)
2012–2014	Figueirense	0	(0)
2014–2015	→ Santo André (loan)	0	(0)
2016–2017	Inter de Lages	10	(0)
2017–2018	Atlético Tubarão	0	(0)
2018	→ Figueirense (loan)	0	(0)
2018–2019	América de Cali	33	(0)
2019	→ Deportivo Pasto	26	(0)
2020	Shimizu S-Pulse	3	(0)
2021	Concórdia	9	(0)
2021–2022	Peñarol	9	(0)
2023–	Deportes Tolima	39	(0)
- * Club domestic league appearances and goals as of 8 June 2023

Alvino Volpi Neto (born 1 August 1992), commonly known as Neto Volpi, is a Brazilian professional footballer who plays as a goalkeeper for Deportes Tolima of the Categoría Primera A.

== Career ==
Neto Volpi began his career playing for Figueirense's youth sides. In 2014, Santo André announced the signing of Volpi on loan.

He returned to Santa Catarina, his home state, after joining Inter de Lages for the 2016 season. Neto Volpi eventually became the club's first-stringer goalkeeper in all three tournaments Inter de Lages played throughout the season – Campeonato Catarinense, Copa do Brasil and Campeonato Brasileiro Série D.

Afterwards, he signed with América de Cali. Neto Volpi currently plays for Shimizu S-Pulse earning £3,000 per week.

== Personal life ==
Neto Volpi is cousin of the also goalkeeper Tiago Volpi and brother of Fabian Volpi.

== Honours ==
Santo André

- Copa Paulista: 2014

Figueirense

- Campeonato Catarinense: 2018

América de Cali

- Primera A (Finalización): 2019

Peñarol

- Uruguayan Primera División: 2021

Individual

- Best goalkeeper of Primera A (Apertura): 2019
