= Guilherme Lazaroni =

Brazilian footballer (born 1992)

Personal information
- Full name: Guilherme Henrique dos Reis Lazaroni
- Date of birth: 18 November 1992 (age 33)
- Place of birth: Rio Claro, Brazil
- Height: 1.79 m (5 ft 10 in)
- Position: Left back

Team information
- Current team: Barra-SC

Senior career*
Years	Team	Apps	(Gls)
2012	Figueirense	12	(0)
2013	Tombense	11	(1)
2013–2014	Fortaleza	6	(0)
2014–2018	Figueirense	32	(0)
2015	→ Portimonense (loan)	10	(0)
2016	→ Linense (loan)	6	(0)
2016	→ Red Bull Brasil (loan)	16	(2)
2018–2020	Portimonense	3	(0)
2019	→ Sport Recife (loan)	10	(0)
2020	→ Ponte Preta (loan)	42	(1)
2021–2022	Novorizontino	13	(1)
2022–2023	Vitória	9	(1)
2023–2024	Hercílio Luz	25	(0)
2024	Ituano	15	(0)
2025	Água Santa	6	(0)
2025–	Barra-SC	22	(0)
- * Club domestic league appearances and goals as of 11 November 2026

Guilherme Henrique dos Reis Lazaroni (born 18 November 1992), commonly known as Guilherme Lazaroni, is a Brazilian footballer who plays as a left back for Barra-SC.

== Career statistics ==
=== Club ===
As of 29 March 2019.

Club	Season	League			Cup		Continental		Other		Total	
Club	Season	Division	Apps	Goals	Apps	Goals	Apps	Goals	Apps	Goals	Apps	Goals
Figueirense	2012	Série A	10	0	0	0	2 (Note: Appearances in the Copa Sudamericana)	0	6 (Note: Appearances in the Campeonato Catarinense)	0	18	0
Tombense	2013	–			0	0	–		11 (Note: Appearances in the Campeonato Mineiro)	1	11	1
Fortaleza	2013	Série C	5	0	1 (Note: Appearances in the Copa do Brasil)	0	–		0	0	6	0
Fortaleza	2014	Série C	0	0	0	0	–		0	0	0	0
Fortaleza	Total		5	0	1	0	0	0	0	0	6	0
Figueirense	2014	Série A	6	0	3	0	–		1	0	10	0
Figueirense	2015	Série A	0	0	0	0	–		0	0	0	0
Figueirense	2016	Série A	0	0	0	0	–		0	0	0	0
Figueirense	2017	Série B	9	0	0	0	–		0	0	9	0
Figueirense	2018	Série B	12	0	4	0	–		6	0	22	0
Figueirense	Total		32	0	7	0	0	0	7	0	46	0
Portimonense (loan)	2014–15	Segunda Liga	10	0	0	0	–		0	0	10	0
Linense (loan)	2016	Série D	0	0	1	0	–		5 (Note: Appearances in the Campeonato Paulista)	0	6	0
Red Bull Brasil (loan)	2017	Série D	0	0	14 (Note: Appearances in the Copa Paulista)	1	–		4	1	18	2
Portimonense	2018–19	Primeira Liga	3	0	0	0	–		0	0	3	0
Sport Recife (loan)	2019	Série B	0	0	0	0	–		3 (Note: Appearances in the Campeonato Pernambucano)	0	3	0
Career total			60	0	23	1	2	0	36	2	121	3
