= Marquinho (footballer, born 2002) =

Brazilian footballer

Personal information
- Full name: Marco Antonio Marsulo Junior
- Date of birth: 5 April 2002 (age 24)
- Place of birth: São José do Rio Pardo, Brazil
- Height: 1.81 m (5 ft 11 in)
- Position: Attacking midfielder

Team information
- Current team: Barra-SC

Youth career
- 2015–2018: São Paulo
- 2019: Juventus-SP
- 2020: Cruzeiro
- 2021: Chapecoense

Senior career*
Years	Team	Apps	(Gls)
2021–2022	Chapecoense	11	(0)
2022–2023	Barra-SC	14	(1)
2023	→ Figueirense (loan)	5	(0)
2023–2026	Académico de Viseu	54	(8)
2025–2026	→ Botafogo-SP (loan)	34	(3)
2026–	Barra-SC	1	(1)
- * Club domestic league appearances and goals as of 11 November 2026

Marco Antonio Marsulo Junior (born 5 April 2002), commonly known as Marquinho, is a Brazilian professional footballer who plays as an attacking midfielder for Barra-SC.

== Club career ==
Born in São José do Rio Pardo, São Paulo, Marquinho started his career at the age of 13 with São Paulo. He subsequently represented Juventus-SP and Cruzeiro before joining Chapecoense in 2021.

Marquinho made his first team – and Série A – debut on 10 October 2021, coming on as a second-half substitute for Geuvânio in a 2–5 away loss against Internacional.

On 10 June 2025, Marquinho returned to Brazil and joined Botafogo-SP on loan.

== Career statistics ==
As of 25 October 2021

Club	Season	League			State league		National cup		Continental		Other		Total	
Club	Season	Division	Apps	Goals	Apps	Goals	Apps	Goals	Apps	Goals	Apps	Goals	Apps	Goals
Chapecoense	2021	Série A	5	1	0	0	0	0	—		—		5	1
Career total			5	1	0	0	0	0	0	0	0	0	5	1

== Honours ==
Individual

- Liga Portugal 2 Midfielder of the Month: January 2024
