= Geovany Soares =

Brazilian footballer

- Geovany with Atlético Goianiense in 2026

Personal information
- Full name: Geovany dos Santos Soares
- Date of birth: 28 July 2000 (age 26)
- Place of birth: Maceió, Brazil
- Height: 1.68 m (5 ft 6 in)
- Position: Winger

Team information
- Current team: Atlético Goianiense (on loan from Atlético Tubarão)

Youth career
- 2019–2021: Jacobina

Senior career*
| Years | Team | Apps | (Gls) |
| 2021 | Jaciobá | 4 | (1) |
| 2021 | Itabaiana | 5 | (0) |
| 2021 | Zumbi | 9 | (6) |
| 2022 | CSP | 5 | (2) |
| 2022 | Grêmio Prudente | 16 | (3) |
| 2023 | Parintins | 9 | (2) |
| 2023 | XV de Jaú | 17 | (3) |
| 2024 | Rio Claro | 15 | (3) |
| 2024– | Atlético Tubarão | 11 | (4) |
| 2024–2025 | → Marcílio Dias (loan) | 12 | (4) |
| 2025 | → Santa Cruz (loan) | 23 | (5) |
| 2026 | → Barra-SC (loan) | 12 | (3) |
| 2026– | → Atlético Goianiense (loan) | 30 | (3) |
- * Club domestic league appearances and goals as of 03:38, 5 October 2026 (UTC)

Geovany dos Santos Soares (born 28 July 2000), known as Geovany Soares or just Geovany, is a Brazilian professional footballer who plays as a winger for Campeonato Brasileiro Série B club Atlético Goianiense, on loan from Atlético Tubarão.

== Career ==
Geovany Soares began his professional career in 2021 with Jaciobá in Alagoas. After playing for teams without a national calendar, he stood out in 2025 playing for Santa Cruz in their runner-up campaign in Série D. Linked to Atlético Tubarão, he was loaned to Barra-SC and helped the club to win their first-ever Campeonato Catarinense title in 2026.

In March, Geovany Soares was loaned to Série B side Atlético Goianiense until the end of the year.

== Personal life ==
Geovany Soares is cousin of the International footballer Marta.

== Honours ==
Grêmio Prudente

- Campeonato Paulista Série A4: 2022

Barra

- Campeonato Catarinense: 2026
