= Fabian Volpi =

Brazilian footballer

Personal information
- Full name: Fabian Harry Volpi
- Date of birth: 11 July 1997 (age 29)
- Place of birth: Florianópolis, Brazil
- Height: 1.86 m (6 ft 1 in)
- Position: Goalkeeper

Team information
- Current team: Barra-SC

Youth career
- –2016: Inter de Lages

Senior career*
Years	Team	Apps	(Gls)
2016–2018	Inter de Lages	11	(0)
2017	→ Hercílio Luz (loan)	0	(0)
2019	Metropolitano	9	(0)
2020–2021	Joinville	15	(0)
2022	Aimoré	27	(0)
2023	Amazonas	6	(0)
2023–2024	Caxias	26	(0)
2024	Amazonas	1	(0)
2025	Retrô	34	(0)
2026–	Barra-SC	5	(0)
- * Club domestic league appearances and goals as of 11 November 2026

Fabian Volpi (born 11 July 1997) is a Brazilian footballer who plays as a goalkeeper for Barra-SC.

== Career ==
Fabian Volpi began his career playing football in the state of Santa Catarina, and also had notable spells in Caxias and Amazonas. For 2025, he signed a contract with Retrô.

In January 2026, Volpi signed with Barra-SC.

== Personal life ==
Fabian Volpi is cousin of the goalkeeper Tiago Volpi and the younger brother of the also goalkeeper Neto Volpi.

== Honours ==
Amazonas

- Campeonato Amazonense: 2023

Joinville

- Copa Santa Catarina: 2020
- Recopa Catarinense: 2021

Barra

- Campeonato Catarinense: 2026
