= Esporte Clube Água Santa =

Água Santa
- Full name: Esporte Clube Água Santa
- Nickname: Netuno (Neptune)
- Founded: 27 October 1981; 44 years ago
- Ground: Distrital do Inamar
- Capacity: 10,000
- President: Paulo Sirqueira Korek Farias
- Head coach: Pintado
- League: Campeonato Brasileiro Série D Campeonato Paulista Série A2
- 2025 2025: Série D, 25th of 64; Paulista, 15th of 16 (relegated)
- Website: www.ecaguasanta.com
Home colours	Away colours	Third colours

Esporte Clube Água Santa, commonly referred to as simply Água Santa, is a Brazilian association football club in Diadema, São Paulo, currently playing in the Campeonato Paulista A2, the second tier of the São Paulo state football league, and the Campeonato Brasileiro Série D.

Founded as an amateur team by migrants in 1981, Água Santa became one of the strongest non-professional teams in the ABC region, winning 17 titles during that time. On 8 December 2011, the team turned pro, joining the Campeonato Paulista Segunda Divisão in 2013. Água Santa won three consecutive promotions in their first years of professionalism, and by 2016, they were already in the top tier of the Campeonato Paulista. They were relegated back to Campeonato Paulista Série A2 after just one season in the top flight. They were promoted to the first division again for the 2020 season, were relegated again in the same year, and won promotion back to the top tier in the following season.

Since the beginning of the professional era, Água Santa has played at Estádio Distrital do Inamar. The club's home colours are white and blue and the team mascot is Neptune, the Roman god of the sea. Their main rivals are São Bernardo, São Caetano and Santo André. Água Santa also had a troublesome off-field relationship with cross-town rivals Clube Atlético Diadema, which resulted in the latter team leaving for Ribeirão Pires.

== History ==
=== Amateur era (1981–2011) ===
Água Santa was founded by migrants from Northern Brazil, Northeastern Brazil and Minas Gerais on 27 October 1981 as an amateur team in the Eldorado neighborhood of Diadema, on a street called Estrada Água Santa, which is where the club got its name from. In the 2000s, the club grew into one of the powerhouses of the Diadema amateur football league. The club won the local third division in 2000 and the second division the following year. They finished second in the league in 2002 and 2003, and in 2004 they won the title for the first time. Água Santa were runners-up again in 2005 and 2006.

In 2008, Água Santa played in the Copa Uniligas, an amateur cup contested by the best performing teams in the ABC region. They made it all the way to the finals, but ended up losing 1–0 to Santo André side União Vila Sá. Água Santa won three consecutive Diadema amateur football league titles from 2009 to 2011, establishing the team as the strongest in the city. Their amateur league games already attracted crowds of over 5,000 fans to Arena Inamar every sunday, and the team gained national attention after former Corinthians star Dinei, who had also played for Água Santa, wore the team's shirt during the fourth season of the A Fazenda reality show. As Diadema was one of the few larger cities in São Paulo that never had a professional football team, the club decided to turn pro, paying a R$600,000 fee to join the Federação Paulista de Futebol, quitting the amateur league in the process.

Former footballer Capitão was chosen to be Netuno's director of football, and Paulo Sirqueira Korek Farias was the club's first (and so far only) president, with Revelino "Pretinho" Teixeira serving as the vice-president. The Roman god of the sea Neptune was chosen to be the team's mascot due to their name (Holy Water, in Portuguese) and the club's proximity to the Billings dam. Their home stadium is also next to a Sabesp water tank facility.

=== Meteoric rise (2012–2016) ===
The club chose to take part only in youth tournaments in 2012. They played their first youth league games undear coach Lilló on 7 April 2014, against local rivals Santo André at Estádio Bruno José Daniel. The U15 clash ended in a goalless draw, while the U17 team lost 0–1. While the under-20 and under-17 sides were eliminated in the first stage of their respective leagues, the U15 Água Santa team performed better, reaching the third stage of the U-15 Campeonato Paulista in their first year.

Márcio Ribeiro was hired to be Água Santa's manager in the 2013 Campeonato Paulista Segunda Divisão. Their first ever professional match game was held on 28 April 2013 at Baetão, in São Bernardo do Campo. Over 1,500 fans attended the match against EC São Bernardo, who took the lead in the 61st minute. Three minutes later, midfielder Lucas Limão scored Netuno's first ever professional goal, converting a penalty kick. He scored again in the 73rd minute, giving Água Santa their first ever league win. Água Santa played their first home game against crosstown rivals and fellow debutant side CAD on 4 May, losing 2–3 in front of a sold-out crowd. In spite of their local derby defeat, Água Santa's matches kept attracting large crowds and the club eventually won promotion to Série A3 on 13 October, following a 3–1 win against Cotia. The club also made it to the league finals against Matonense. Although Água Santa comfortably won the first leg 5–2, they lost the away leg 4–0 and had to settle for second place in their first ever professional league season.

The team saw continued success in the 2014 Campeonato Paulista Série A3, finishing sixth in the first stage and achieving promotion for the second straight year, after finishing the second stage in second place in their group, which also featured Sertãozinho, São José dos Campos and eventual league winners Novorizontino. In the 2015 season, Água Santa finished fourth in Campeonato Paulista Série A2, achieving promotion once again, this time to the first tier of the São Paulo state league. Due to the club's arrival in the top flight, the Estádio Distrital do Inamar had to go through reconstruction, which increased the stadium capacity to 10,000 people.

Rule changes for the 2016 Campeonato Paulista saw six clubs being relegated instead of the usual four, as the Federação Paulista de Futebol intended to decrease the number of participant clubs from 20 to 16. Água Santa had a decent start to the championship, winning three of the first five games, but soon after the team went into a six-game winless streak, putting Netuno in the relegation zone and resulting in the sacking of long-time manager Márcio Ribeiro after nearly four years in charge of the club. Márcio Bittencourt was appointed the new manager soon after. His first match in charge was against Palmeiras on 27 March. The game ended in a resounding 4–1 win for the Diadema side, which was called "a humiliation" by newspaper O Estado de S. Paulo. The result of that match is now often used as a provocation against Palmeiras' fans by rivals and even by Água Santa itself multiple times. Despite the media repercussion, that would end up being their only win until the end of the tournament. On 2 April, Água Santa suffered their biggest defeat in history, a 7–2 thrashing by Ponte Preta at Moisés Lucarelli. A home loss to São Bernardo in the final matchday of the first stage, combined with a Botafogo win over Capivariano officially relegated Água Santa back to the second division for the 2017 season.

=== Later years (2016–present) ===
Following their relegation, Água Santa took part in the Copa Paulista for the first time in 2016. Bittencourt was replaced by Edinho, who signed a one-year deal to be the new head coach. He left the club by mutual consent after just nine games in charge, and on 21 September, Fahel Júnior was appointed as the new manager. Under Fahel, Água Santa couldn't get past the second stage of the Copa Paulista.

For the 2017 Campeonato Paulista Série A2, Jorginho was chosen to lead the club back to the top tier of the Paulistão. He was joined by former club manager Márcio Ribeiro, who was hired for a director role. The season started well for Água Santa, as the club finished the first stage leading the competition. They played Bragantino in the semifinals, and narrowly missed promotion, being eliminated in a penalty shoot-out. Their Copa Paulista run was also short-fated, as Água Santa again lost in the second stage.

Jorginho remained at the helm for 2018, but unlike in the previous season, the club had a rough start in Série A2, which led to Jorginho's dismissal on 28 January. The same day, the club announced Toninho Cecílio as his replacement. Água Santa kept struggling under Cecílio, who was fired after failing to lead the club to a single win in six matches. With the club at the bottom of the table, Márcio Ribeiro returned to a coaching role for the remainder of the tournament, saving the club from relegation. Água Santa chose to field their U20 team in the 2018 Copa Paulista. Under Antônio Carlos Papel, the club did not perform well. They were eliminated in the first stage, finishing last in their group.

With Ribeiro back in charge for the 2019 Campeonato Paulista Série A2, Água Santa returned to good form and finished the first stage at the top of the table. They beat Taubaté in both legs of the quarterfinals but lost to Santo André in the semifinals, which would cause them to miss promotion. However, the acquisition of Bragantino by Red Bull in the top flight automatically relegated Red Bull Brasil, as the same company is not allowed to have two clubs in the same division. This opened up a spot in the 2020 Campeonato Paulista, which went to Água Santa, who had finished third overall in the second tier. That would not be enough to keep Ribeiro in charge of the club for the Copa Paulista, as he was dismissed on 30 April 2019. Former Santo André head coach Fernando Marchiori was brought in to be in charge of the club in the cup. After finishing the first stage leading their group, Netuno's cup run ended in the second stage for the third time in four years.

Água Santa had a bad start to the 2020 season, losing their first three Paulistão games without scoring a single goal. The poor run resulted in Fernando Marchiori's firing on 30 January 2020. Pintado was named his replacement for the remainder of the Campeonato Paulista. The new head coach led Água Santa to their first win of the year on 8 February, against Ferroviária, and took the team out of the relegation zone. On 27 March, with the competition on hold due to the COVID-19 pandemic, Pintado left Água Santa for Brasileirão Série B side Juventude. On 30 June, it was reported that Toninho Cecílio would return for a second stint in charge of the club for the remaining two games of the tournament. Água Santa failed to get a win under Cecílio, and were relegated back to Série A2 at the end of the competition.

== Stadium ==
Esporte Clube Água Santa play their home games at Estádio Distrital do Inamar. The stadium has a maximum capacity of 10,000 people.

== Current squad ==
=== First team squad ===
As of 13 February 2025

Note: Flags indicate national team as defined under FIFA eligibility rules; some limited exceptions apply. Players may hold more than one non-FIFA nationality.

No.	Pos.	Nation	Player
—	GK	BRA	Luan Ribeiro
—	GK	BRA	Lucas Arceli
—	GK	BRA	Matheus Novaes
—	DF	CHI	Andrés Robles (on loan from Deportes Antofagasta)
—	DF	BRA	Fábio Sanches
—	DF	BRA	Joílson
—	DF	BRA	Lucas Rocha
—	DF	BRA	Rafael Vaz
—	DF	BRA	Roger
—	DF	BRA	Stephanno
—	DF	BRA	Diogo Batista (on loan from Coritiba)
—	DF	BRA	Guilherme Lazaroni
—	DF	BRA	Renan Castro
—	DF	BRA	Ynaiã

No.	Pos.	Nation	Player
—	MF	BRA	Luan Dias
—	MF	BRA	Ramon Vinicius
—	MF	BRA	Robinho
—	MF	BRA	Villian
—	MF	BRA	Wesley Dias
—	FW	BRA	Ademilson
—	FW	BRA	Davi Gomes
—	FW	BRA	Gabriel Silva (on loan from Vila Nova)
—	FW	BRA	Arthur Korek
—	FW	BRA	Marco Antônio
—	FW	BRA	Neilton
—	FW	BRA	Willen Mota
—	FW	BRA	Marquinhos

=== Youth players ===
Note: Flags indicate national team as defined under FIFA eligibility rules; some limited exceptions apply. Players may hold more than one non-FIFA nationality.

No.	Pos.	Nation	Player
—	DF	BRA	Bryan Ribeiro
—	MF	BRA	Diego Anjos

No.	Pos.	Nation	Player
—	FW	BRA	Ryan Santos

== Honours ==
=== State ===
- Campeonato Paulista
  - Runners-up (1): 2023
- Campeonato Paulista Série A2
  - Runners-up (1): 2021
- Campeonato Paulista Série A4
  - Runners-up (1): 2013

=== City ===
- Campeonato Amador de Diadema
  - Winners (3): 2004, 2009, 2010
- Campeonato Amador de Diadema – Segunda Divisão
  - Winners (1): 2001
- Campeonato Amador de Diadema – Terceira Divisão
  - Winners (1): 2000
- Divisão Especial da Liga de Futebol Amador de Diadema
  - Winners (1): 2011
- Copa Kaiser
  - Winners (1): 2002
