= Walter Clar =

Paraguayan footballer (born 1994)

Personal information
- Full name: Walter David Clar Fritz
- Date of birth: 27 September 1994 (age 32)
- Place of birth: Pirapó, Paraguay
- Height: 1.79 m (5 ft 10 in)
- Position: Left-back

Team information
- Current team: Atlante
- Number: 37

Youth career
- 2010–2013: Olimpia

Senior career*
Years	Team	Apps	(Gls)
2013–2017	Olimpia	57	(3)
2015	→ Rubio Ñu (loan)	15	(2)
2016	→ General Díaz (loan)	8	(1)
2016	→ Sportivo Luqueño (loan)	13	(0)
2017	Sportivo Luqueño	4	(0)
2017–2018	General Díaz	6	(2)
2018–2019	Independiente	39	(5)
2019	Sol de América	19	(4)
2019	→ Boavista (loan)	0	(0)
2020	Guaraní	8	(1)
2021–2022	Nacional Asunción	37	(1)
2022	River Plate Montevideo	30	(1)
2023	Guaraní	11	(0)
2023–2024	Tacuary	47	(3)
2024–2026	Chapecoense	82	(14)
2026–	Atlante	6	(0)

International career
2015	Paraguay U23	3	(0)
- * Club domestic league appearances and goals as of 18 September 2026

Walter David Clar Fritz (born 27 September 1994) is a Paraguayan professional footballer who plays as a left-back for Liga MX club Atlante.

== Club career ==
Born in Pirapó, Clar began his career with Club Olimpia and was promoted to the first team in 2013. He made his professional debut in a 2–1 Paraguayan Primera División loss to Club Sol de América on 28 July 2013.

Despite being a regular starter in the 2014 season, Clar lost space in the following year, and subsequently served loans at Rubio Ñu, General Díaz and Sportivo Luqueño He subsequently signed a permanent deal with the latter for the 2017 season, before returning to General Díaz later in that year and then signing for Independiente FBC in 2018.

On 27 December 2018, Clar agreed to a deal with Sol de América. On 24 July 2019, he moved abroad for the first time in his career, joining Portuguese side Boavista on a one-year loan with an option to buy.

Clar returned to his home country in December 2019, after failing to make an appearance, and joined Guaraní. He left the club in October to sign for Nacional Asunción, and later moved to Uruguayan side River Plate Montevideo on 30 March 2022.

On 6 February 2023, Clar returned to Guaraní. Sparingly used, he moved to Tacuary later in that year, before signing a one-and-a-half-year contract with Série B side Chapecoense on 27 August 2024.

On 13 August 2025, after becoming an undisputed first-choice at Chape, Clar renewed his link until November 2026.
