= Victor Caetano =

Brazilian footballer

Personal information
- Full name: Victor Henrique Carvalho Caetano
- Date of birth: 19 October 1997 (age 29)
- Place of birth: Belo Horizonte, Brazil
- Height: 1.86 m (6 ft 1 in)
- Position: Centre-back

Team information
- Current team: Chapecoense
- Number: 25

Youth career
- 2013–2017: América Mineiro

Senior career*
| Years | Team | Apps | (Gls) |
| 2018 | Social | 6 | (0) |
| 2018 | Fernandópolis | 7 | (0) |
| 2018 | Real-RS | 0 | (0) |
| 2019 | Mirassol | 0 | (0) |
| 2020–2022 | Primavera | 17 | (1) |
| 2021 | → Juventus Jaraguá (loan) | 6 | (0) |
| 2022–2023 | Paraná | 2 | (0) |
| 2023 | → Taubaté (loan) | 11 | (1) |
| 2023 | → Operário-MS (loan) | 7 | (0) |
| 2023 | → Metropolitano (loan) | 3 | (0) |
| 2024 | Desportivo Brasil | 18 | (0) |
| 2024 | Paraná | 5 | (0) |
| 2024– | Chapecoense | 53 | (3) |
- * Club domestic league appearances and goals as of 14:30, 1 June 2026 (UTC)

Victor Henrique Carvalho Caetano (born 19 October 1997), known as Victor Caetano, is a Brazilian footballer who plays as a centre-back for Chapecoense.

== Career ==
Born in Belo Horizonte, Minas Gerais, Caetano represented América Mineiro as a youth. After making his senior debut with Social in 2018, he subsequently played for Fernandópolis and Real-RS before signing for Mirassol.

Caetano joined Primavera ahead of the 2020 season, but was subsequently loaned out to Juventus Jaraguá. On 27 April 2022, he moved to Paraná, and renewed his contract for a further year on 14 December.

On 14 January 2023, Caetano was loaned to Taubaté. He subsequently served another loan stints at Operário-MS and Metropolitano in that year, before signing for Desportivo Brasil on 15 December.

On 3 May 2024, Caetano returned to Paraná. In August, he signed for Chapecoense, initially as a member of the group to play in the Copa Santa Catarina.

On 28 November 2024, after managing to break through the first team in the Série B, Caetano renewed his contract with Chape for a further year. He subsequently started to feature regularly for the side, and further extended his link until November 2026 on 30 May 2025.

== Career statistics ==
As of 1 June 2026

| Club | Season | League | | | State League | | Cup | | Continental | | Other | | Total | |
| Club | Season | Division | Apps | Goals | Apps | Goals | Apps | Goals | Apps | Goals | Apps | Goals | Apps | Goals |
|---|---|---|---|---|---|---|---|---|---|---|---|---|---|---|
| Social | 2018 | Mineiro Módulo II | — | | 6 | 0 | — | | — | | — | | 6 | 0 |
| Fernandópolis | 2018 | Paulista 2ª Divisão | — | | 7 | 0 | — | | — | | — | | 7 | 0 |
| Real-RS | 2018 | Gaúcho Série B | — | | 0 | 0 | — | | — | | — | | 0 | 0 |
| Mirassol | 2019 | Paulista | — | | 0 | 0 | — | | — | | 20 (Note: Appearance(s) in Copa Paulista) | 1 | 20 | 1 |
| Primavera | 2020 | Paulista A3 | — | | 13 | 1 | — | | — | | 8 | 0 | 21 | 1 |
| Primavera | 2021 | Paulista A3 | — | | — | | — | | — | | 6 | 0 | 6 | 0 |
| Primavera | 2022 | Paulista A2 | — | | 4 | 0 | — | | — | | — | | 4 | 0 |
| Primavera | Total | | — | | 17 | 1 | — | | — | | 14 | 0 | 31 | 1 |
| Juventus Jaraguá (loan) | 2020 | Catarinense | — | | 0 | 0 | — | | — | | 6 (Note: Appearance(s) in Copa Santa Catarina) | 0 | 6 | 0 |
| Juventus Jaraguá (loan) | 2021 | Catarinense | — | | 6 | 0 | — | | — | | — | | 6 | 0 |
| Juventus Jaraguá (loan) | Total | | — | | 6 | 0 | — | | — | | 6 | 0 | 12 | 0 |
| Paraná | 2022 | Série D | 2 | 0 | — | | — | | — | | — | | 2 | 0 |
| Taubaté (loan) | 2023 | Paulista A2 | — | | 11 | 1 | — | | — | | — | | 11 | 1 |
| Operário-MS (loan) | 2023 | Série D | 4 | 0 | 3 | 0 | — | | — | | — | | 7 | 0 |
| Metropolitano (loan) | 2023 | Catarinense Série B | — | | 3 | 0 | — | | — | | — | | 3 | 0 |
| Desportivo Brasil | 2024 | Paulista A3 | — | | 18 | 0 | — | | — | | — | | 18 | 0 |
| Paraná | 2024 | Paranaense Série Prata | — | | 5 | 0 | — | | — | | — | | 5 | 0 |
| Chapecoense | 2024 | Série B | 3 | 1 | — | | — | | — | | — | | 3 | 1 |
| Chapecoense | 2025 | Série B | 28 | 1 | 2 | 0 | — | | — | | — | | 30 | 1 |
| Chapecoense | 2026 | Série A | 8 | 0 | 12 | 1 | 2 | 0 | — | | — | | 22 | 1 |
| Chapecoense | Total | | 39 | 2 | 14 | 1 | 2 | 0 | — | | — | | 55 | 2 |
| Career total | | | 45 | 2 | 90 | 3 | 2 | 0 | 0 | 0 | 40 | 1 | 177 | 6 |

== Honours ==
Paraná

- Campeonato Paranaense Série Prata: 2024
