= Wagner Balotelli =

Brazilian footballer

Personal information
- Full name: Wagner Pereira Marques
- Date of birth: 1 September 1992 (age 34)
- Place of birth: Brasília, Brazil
- Height: 1.80 m (5 ft 11 in)
- Position: Midfielder

Team information
- Current team: Santa Cruz (on loan)

Senior career*
Years	Team	Apps	(Gls)
2017	Samambaia		
2018	Gama	3	(0)
2018	América-GO		
2018	Cruzeiro-DF		
2019–2020	Gama	25	(1)
2019	→ Anápolis (loan)	9	(1)
2020–	Brasiliense	50	(1)
2022	→ Camboriú (loan)	16	(1)
2022	→ Brusque (loan)	29	(1)
2023	→ Camboriú (loan)	20	(0)
2023	→ Brusque (loan)	7	(0)
2024	→ São José-SP (loan)	22	(1)
2024	→ Tombense (loan)	4	(0)
2025–	→ Santa Cruz (loan)	32	(1)
- * Club domestic league appearances and goals as of 29 May 2025

Wagner Pereira Marques (born 1 September 1992), better known as Wagner Balotelli, is a Brazilian professional footballer who plays as a midfielder for Santa Cruz, on loan from Brasiliense.

== Career ==
Born in Brasília, Wagner Balotelli was successful at the state's two biggest clubs, SE Gama and Brasiliense FC. He was also loaned to Camboriú and Brusque, twice each. On 2024, Balotelli was loaned to São José for the Campeonato Paulista Série A2 dispute. and in July 2024, loaned to Tombense FC for the 2024 Campeonato Brasileiro Série C.

In 2025 season, Balotelli is loaned again, this time to Santa Cruz FC.

== Honours ==
Gama

- Campeonato Brasiliense: 2019, 2020

Brasiliense

- Copa Verde: 2020
- Campeonato Brasiliense: 2021, 2022
