= Wermeson =

Brazilian footballer

Personal information
- Full name: Wermeson do Carmo Silva
- Date of birth: 16 February 2001 (age 25)
- Place of birth: Rondonópolis, Brazil
- Height: 1.68 m (5 ft 6 in)
- Position: Midfielder

Team information
- Current team: Portimonense (on loan from Camboriú)
- Number: 38

Youth career
- 2018–2022: Guarani

Senior career*
Years	Team	Apps	(Gls)
2021–2022	Guarani	0	(0)
2022	→ América de Natal (loan)	8	(0)
2023	América de Natal	20	(1)
2023	União São João	17	(3)
2024	ASA	4	(0)
2024	União São João	9	(2)
2024–2025	São Caetano	19	(9)
2025–	Camboriú	10	(3)
2026	→ Chapecoense (loan)	0	(0)
2026–	→ Portimonense (loan)	3	(0)
- * Club domestic league appearances and goals as of 12 September 2026

Wermeson do Carmo Silva (born 16 February 2001), simply known as Wermeson, is a Brazilian professional footballer who plays as a midfielder for Liga Portugal 2 club Portimonense on loan from Camboriú.

== Career ==
Trained in the youth sectors of Guarani FC, he stayed at the club from 2018 to 2022, when it was acquired by América-RN, where he would become champion of the 2022 Campeonato Brasileiro Série D and the state championship in 2023. In the second semester he defended União São João being once again champion of the fourth tier of football in São Paulo.

After a two-month spell at ASA and competing in the Paulista Série A4 again for União São João, in June 2024 Wermeson was hired by São Caetano, becoming the team's top scorer in the Copa Paulista.

== Honours ==
América de Natal

- Campeonato Brasileiro Série D: 2022
- Campeonato Potiguar: 2023

União São João

- Campeonato Paulista Série A4: 2023

Individual

- 2024 Copa Paulista top scorer: 7 goals
