= Nádson (footballer, born 1989) =

Brazilian footballer

Personal information
- Full name: Nádson da Silva Almeida
- Date of birth: 22 July 1989 (age 37)
- Place of birth: Lauro de Freitas, Brazil
- Height: 1.70 m (5 ft 7 in)
- Position: Attacking midfielder

Team information
- Current team: Botafogo-PB

Youth career
- Coritiba
- 2007–2009: São Carlos
- 2008: → Santos (loan)

Senior career*
Years	Team	Apps	(Gls)
2009	São Carlos	17	(4)
2009–2012	Palmeiras B	36	(13)
2011	→ Grêmio Barueri (loan)	2	(0)
2012	→ Ponte Preta (loan)	2	(0)
2013	Avaí	0	(0)
2013	Bragantino	2	(0)
2013–2014	Audax	8	(0)
2014	→ Guaratinguetá (loan)	11	(2)
2015	Caldense	0	(0)
2015	Sampaio Corrêa	31	(10)
2016	Paraná	25	(3)
2017–2018	Chapecoense	38	(1)
2018	→ Paraná (loan)	10	(0)
2019	Botafogo SP	43	(3)
2020–2021	CSA	49	(4)
2021	Sampaio Corrêa	19	(2)
2022–	Botafogo-PB	0	(0)
- * Club domestic league appearances and goals as of 19 January 2019

Nádson da Silva Almeida (born 22 June 1989), simply known as Nádson, is a Brazilian footballer who plays as an attacking midfielder for Botafogo-PB.

== Club career ==
A São Carlos youth graduate, Nádson was born in Lauro de Freitas, Bahia. In 2009, he joined Palmeiras, but failed to make a single appearance for the first team, being only limited to play for the reserve team and serving loan stints at Grêmio Barueri and Ponte Preta; with the latter he made his Série A debut on 20 May 2012, coming on as a second-half substitute for Tony in a 0–1 home loss against Atlético Mineiro.

Nádson subsequently represented Avaí, Bragantino, Audax, Guaratinguetá, Caldense, Sampaio Corrêa and Paraná in quick succession; with the second last he scored a career-best ten goals in the year's Série B. On 28 December 2016, after cutting ties with the latter, he signed a two-year deal with Chapecoense in the first division.

On 28 December 2018, Nádson signed for Botafogo SP.

== Career statistics ==
As of 9 April 2017

Club	Season	League			State League		Cup		Continental		Other		Total	
Club	Season	Division	Apps	Goals	Apps	Goals	Apps	Goals	Apps	Goals	Apps	Goals	Apps	Goals
São Carlos	2009	Paulista A3	—		17	4	—		—		—		17	4
Palmeiras B	2009	Paulista A3	—		0	0	—		—		8 (Note: Appearance(s) in Copa Paulista)	0	8	0
Palmeiras B	2010	Paulista A3	—		24	5	—		—		9	1	33	6
Palmeiras B	2011	Paulista A2	—		18	6	—		—		—		18	6
Palmeiras B	2012	Paulista A2	—		18	7	—		—		—		18	7
Palmeiras B	Total		—		60	18	—		—		17	1	77	19
Grêmio Barueri (loan)	2011	Série B	2	0	—		—		—		—		2	0
Ponte Preta (loan)	2012	Série A	1	0	—		—		—		—		1	0
Avaí	2013	Série B	0	0	12	2	1	0	—		—		13	2
Bragantino	2013	Série B	2	0	—		—		—		—		2	0
Audax	2013	Paulista A2	—		0	0	—		—		10	4	10	4
Audax	2014	Paulista	—		8	0	—		—		—		8	0
Audax	Total		—		8	0	—		—		10	4	18	4
Guaratinguetá (loan)	2014	Série C	2	0	—		—		—		—		2	0
Caldense	2015	Série D	0	0	14	1	—		—		—		14	1
Sampaio Corrêa	2015	Série B	31	10	—		—		—		—		31	10
Paraná	2016	Série B	25	3	14	2	4	2	—		—		43	7
Chapecoense	2017	Série A	0	0	12	0	0	0	0	0	0	0	12	0
Career total			63	13	137	27	5	2	0	0	27	5	232	47

== Honours ==
Chapecoense

- Campeonato Catarinense: 2017

CSA

- Campeonato Alagoano: 2021
