= David Antunes =

Brazilian footballer

Personal information
- Full name: David Antunes da Silva
- Date of birth: 17 August 2005 (age 21)
- Place of birth: Chapecó, Brazil
- Height: 1.78 m (5 ft 10 in)
- Position: Midfielder

Team information
- Current team: Chapecoense
- Number: 19

Youth career
- 2017–2025: Chapecoense

Senior career*
Years	Team	Apps	(Gls)
2024–	Chapecoense	11	(0)
- * Club domestic league appearances and goals as of 04:12, 6 May 2026 (UTC)

David Antunes da Silva (born 17 August 2005), known as David Antunes or just David, is a Brazilian footballer who plays as a midfielder for Chapecoense.

== Career ==
Born in Chapecó, Santa Catarina, David joined the youth categories of hometown side Chapecoense in 2017, for the under-12s. After making his senior debut in the 2023 Copa Santa Catarina, he made his professional debut on 24 November 2024, coming on as a late substitute in a 1–0 Série B away loss to Mirassol.

On 31 July 2025, David renewed his link with Chape until 2028. He was handed his first start on 29 September, in a 3–1 away win over Amazonas, and featured in a further four matches as the club achieved promotion to the Série A.

== Career statistics ==
As of 6 May 2026

Club	Season	League			State League		Cup		Continental		Other		Total	
Club	Season	Division	Apps	Goals	Apps	Goals	Apps	Goals	Apps	Goals	Apps	Goals	Apps	Goals
Chapecoense	2023	Série B	—		—		—		—		3 (Note: Appearance(s) in Copa Santa Catarina)	0	3	0
Chapecoense	2024	Série B	1	0	—		—		—		7	0	8	0
Chapecoense	2025	Série B	5	0	0	0	—		—		2	0	7	0
Chapecoense	2026	Série A	4	0	1	0	0	0	—		3 (Note: Appearance(s) in Copa Sul-Sudeste)	0	8	0
Career total			10	0	1	0	0	0	0	0	15	0	26	0
