= Everton (footballer, born April 1995) =

Brazilian footballer

Personal information
- Full name: Everton Souza da Cruz
- Date of birth: 10 April 1995 (age 31)
- Place of birth: Presidente Epitácio, Brazil
- Height: 1.81 m (5 ft 11 in)
- Position: Right-back

Team information
- Current team: Chapecoense
- Number: 26

Youth career
- Marcílio Dias

Senior career*
Years	Team	Apps	(Gls)
2016	Campo Mourão		
2017	Freipaulistano	7	(0)
2018	Inter de Bebedouro	22	(3)
2019	Toledo	10	(0)
2019	Atlético Tubarão	6	(1)
2020	Velo Clube	18	(1)
2021	Uberlândia	8	(0)
2021	Capivariano	6	(0)
2021	Camboriú	18	(3)
2022	Portuguesa Santista	12	(0)
2022–2023	América de Natal	38	(2)
2024	ASA	4	(0)
2024	Camboriú	12	(0)
2025	Serra Branca	11	(4)
2025–	Chapecoense	39	(2)
- * Club domestic league appearances and goals as of 9 April 2026

Everton Souza da Cruz (born 10 April 1995), simply known as Everton, is a Brazilian footballer who plays as a right-back for Chapecoense.

== Career ==
Born in Presidente Epitácio, São Paulo, Everton played for Marcílio Dias as a youth before making his senior debut with Campo Mourão in 2016.

In the following years, Everton played for Freipaulistano, Inter de Bebedouro and Toledo before signing for Série D side Atlético Tubarão in 2019. On 11 December of that year, he was announced at Velo Clube.

After representing Uberlândia, Capivariano and Camboriú during the 2021 season, Everton began the 2022 campaign at Portuguesa Santista before being presented at América de Natal on 12 April of that year. He helped the side to win the 2022 Série D, and signed for ASA on 6 October 2023.

Everton returned to Cambura in April 2024, before joining Serra Branca on 17 October of that year. On 28 March 2025, he signed a contract with Série B side Chapecoense until November.

On 5 January 2026, after helping Chape to achieve promotion to the Série A, Everton renewed his link with the club for a further year.

== Career statistics ==
As of 1 June 2026

Club	Season	League			State League		Cup		Continental		Other		Total	
Club	Season	Division	Apps	Goals	Apps	Goals	Apps	Goals	Apps	Goals	Apps	Goals	Apps	Goals
Freipaulistano	2017	Sergipano	—		7	0	—		—		—		7	0
Inter de Bebedouro	2018	Paulista 2ª Divisão	—		22	3	—		—		—		22	3
Toledo	2019	Paranaense	—		10	0	—		—		—		10	0
Atlético Tubarão	2019	Série D	6	1	—		—		—		—		6	1
Velo Clube	2020	Paulista A3	—		18	1	—		—		3 (Note: Appearance(s) in Copa Paulista)	0	21	1
Uberlândia	2021	Série D	—		8	0	—		—		—		8	0
Capivariano	2021	Paulista A3	—		6	0	—		—		—		6	0
Camboriú	2021	Catarinense Série B	—		18	3	—		—		—		18	3
Portuguesa Santista	2022	Paulista A2	—		12	0	—		—		—		12	0
América de Natal	2022	Série D	20	0	—		—		—		—		20	0
América de Natal	2023	Série C	5	0	13	2	1	0	—		—		19	2
América de Natal	Total		25	0	13	2	1	0	—		—		39	2
ASA	2024	Série D	—		4	0	—		—		7 (Note: One appearance in Copa do Nordeste, six appearances in Copa Alagoas)	0	11	0
Camboriú	2024	Catarinense Série B	—		12	0	—		—		—		12	0
Serra Branca	2025	Paraibano	—		11	4	—		—		—		11	4
Chapecoense	2025	Série B	24	1	—		—		—		—		24	1
Chapecoense	2026	Série A	14	0	7	1	1	0	—		2 (Note: Appearance(s) in Copa Sul-Sudeste)	0	24	1
Chapecoense	Total		38	1	7	1	1	0	—		2	0	48	2
Career total			69	2	148	14	2	0	0	0	12	0	231	16

== Honours ==
Velo Clube

- Campeonato Paulista Série A3: 2020

América de Natal

- Campeonato Brasileiro Série D: 2022
- Campeonato Potiguar: 2023
