= Arena Barra FC =

Football stadium in Itabaiana, Sergipe, Brazil

- Interactive map of Arena Barra FC
- Full name: Arena Barra Futebol Clube
- Location: Rua Ângelo Cavaglieri, Itajaí, SC, Brazil
- Coordinates: 26.94848136886016°S 48.674721471504746°W
- Owner: Barra-SC
- Operator: Barra-SC
- Capacity: 5,500
- Surface: Natural grass

Construction
- Built: May 2022 – January 2025
- Opened: 19 January 2025

Tenant
- Barra-SC

Arena Barra Futebol Clube is a football stadium in Itajaí, Santa Catarina, Brazil. It has a maximum capacity of 5,500 people, and hosts the home matches of Barra Futebol Clube (SC).

== History ==
In May 2022, Barra started the construction of a training ground and a new stadium. The construction was expected to end in May 2024, but only ended in January 2025 due to climate complications.

On 19 January 2025, the new stadium was officially inaugurated hours before a match against Joinville. The match ended 0–0.
