= 2025 Campeonato Brasileiro Série D =

2025 Brazilian football competition

Campeonato Brasileiro Série D
- Season: 2025
- Dates: 19 April – 4 October
- Champions: Barra (1st title)
- Promoted: Barra; Inter de Limeira; Maranhão; Santa Cruz
- Matches: 510
- Goals: 1,148 (2.25 per match)
- Top goalscorer: Ronaldy (10 goals)
- Biggest home win: Aparecidense 7–0 Porto Velho; Group A5, R11, 5 July
- Biggest away win: União 0–4 ASA; Group A4, R7, 31 May; Independência 1–5 Altos; Round of 32, 1st leg, 3 August
- Highest scoring: 7 goals Mixto 4–3 Porto Velho; Group A5, R1, 20 April; Aparecidense 7–0 Porto Velho; Group A5, R11, 5 July

The 2025 Campeonato Brasileiro Série D (officially the Brasileirão Série D will bank 2025 for sponsorship reasons) was a football competition held in Brazil, equivalent to the fourth division. It began on 19 April and ended on 4 October.

Sixty-four teams competed in the tournament. Sixty teams qualified from their state leagues and cups, and four relegated from the 2024 Campeonato Brasileiro Série C (Aparecidense, Ferroviário, Sampaio Corrêa, and São José).

== Teams ==
Location of teams in 2025 Série D

=== Federation ranking ===
The number of teams from each state was chosen based on the CBF State Ranking.

| Rank | Federation | Coeff. | Teams | Notes |
|---|---|---|---|---|
| 1 | (São Paulo (state)) São Paulo | 92,416 | 4 | |
| 2 | (Rio de Janeiro (state)) Rio de Janeiro | 57,607 | 3 | |
| 3 | Rio Grande do Sul | 41,508 | 3 | +1 (C) |
| 4 | Minas Gerais | 40,481 | 3 | |
| 5 | (Paraná (state)) Paraná | 32,209 | 3 | |
| 6 | Ceará | 26,310 | 3 | +1 (C) |
| 7 | Goiás | 25,942 | 3 | +1 (C) |
| 8 | (Santa Catarina (state)) Santa Catarina | 24,393 | 3 | |
| 9 | Bahia | 22,387 | 3 | |
| 10 | Pernambuco | 12,978 | 2 | |
| 11 | Alagoas | 11,382 | 2 | |
| 12 | Mato Grosso | 10,728 | 2 | |
| 13 | Pará | 9,651 | 2 | |
| 14 | Rio Grande do Norte | 6,696 | 2 | |
| 15 | Maranhão | 6,641 | 2 | +1 (C) |
| 16 | (Amazonas (Brazilian state)) Amazonas | 6,533 | 2 | |
| 17 | Paraíba | 5,638 | 2 | |
| 18 | Sergipe | 4,573 | 2 | |
| 19 | Piauí | 4,071 | 2 | |
| 20 | (Federal District (Brazil)) Distrito Federal | 3,433 | 2 | |
| 21 | Espírito Santo | 2,512 | 2 | |
| 22 | (Acre (state)) Acre | 2,360 | 2 | |
| 23 | Tocantins | 2,224 | 2 | |
| 24 | Roraima | 1,671 | 1 | |
| 25 | Rondônia | 1,511 | 1 | |
| 26 | Mato Grosso do Sul | 1,410 | 1 | |
| 27 | Amapá | 1,285 | 1 | |

=== Participating teams ===
| Federation | Team | Home city | Qualification method |
|---|---|---|---|
| (Acre (state)) Acre | Independência | Rio Branco | 2024 Campeonato Acreano champions |
| (Acre (state)) Acre | Humaitá | Porto Acre | 2024 Campeonato Acreano runners-up |
| Alagoas | ASA | Arapiraca | 2024 Campeonato Alagoano runners-up |
| Alagoas | Penedense | Penedo | 2024 Copa Alagoas runners-up |
| Amapá | Trem | Macapá | 2024 Campeonato Amapaense champions |
| (Amazonas (Brazilian state)) Amazonas | Manaus | Manaus | 2024 Campeonato Amazonense champions |
| (Amazonas (Brazilian state)) Amazonas | Manauara | Manaus | 2024 Campeonato Amazonense 3rd place |
| Bahia | Barcelona de Ilhéus | Ilhéus | 2024 Campeonato Baiano 3rd place |
| Bahia | Jequié | Jequié | 2024 Campeonato Baiano 4th place |
| Bahia | Juazeirense | Juazeiro | 2024 Campeonato Baiano 5th place |
| Ceará | Maracanã | Maracanaú | 2024 Campeonato Cearense 3rd place |
| Ceará | Iguatu | Iguatu | 2024 Campeonato Cearense 6th place |
| Ceará | Horizonte | Horizonte | 2024 Campeonato Cearense 7th place |
| Ceará | Ferroviário | Fortaleza | 2024 Campeonato Brasileiro Série C 19th place |
| Espírito Santo | Rio Branco | Vitória | 2024 Campeonato Capixaba champions |
| Espírito Santo | Porto Vitória | Vitória | 2024 Copa ES champions |
| (Federal District (Brazil)) Federal District | Ceilândia | Ceilândia | 2024 Campeonato Brasiliense champions |
| (Federal District (Brazil)) Federal District | Capital | Paranoá | 2024 Campeonato Brasiliense runners-up |
| Goiás | Goiânia | Goiânia | 2024 Campeonato Goiano 4th place |
| Goiás | Goiatuba | Goiatuba | 2024 Campeonato Goiano 7th place |
| Goiás | Goianésia | Goianésia | 2024 Campeonato Goiano 8th place |
| Goiás | Aparecidense | Aparecida de Goiânia | 2024 Campeonato Brasileiro Série C 18th place |
| Maranhão | Maranhão | São Luís | 2024 Campeonato Maranhense runners-up |
| Maranhão | Imperatriz | Imperatriz | 2024 Campeonato Maranhense 3rd place |
| Maranhão | Sampaio Corrêa | São Luís | 2024 Campeonato Brasileiro Série C 17th place |
| Mato Grosso | Luverdense | Lucas do Rio Verde | 2024 Campeonato Mato-Grossense 3rd place |
| Mato Grosso | Mixto (Note: União Rondonópolis declined to participate due to economic problems, and were replaced by Mixto.) | Cuiabá | 2024 Campeonato Mato-Grossense 4th place |
| Mato Grosso do Sul | Operário | Campo Grande | 2024 Campeonato Sul-Mato-Grossense champions |
| Minas Gerais | Pouso Alegre | Pouso Alegre | 2024 Campeonato Mineiro 6th place |
| Minas Gerais | Itabirito | Itabirito | 2024 Campeonato Mineiro 7th place |
| Minas Gerais | Uberlândia | Uberlândia | 2024 Campeonato Mineiro 8th place |
| Pará | Tuna Luso | Belém | 2024 Campeonato Paraense 3rd place |
| Pará | Águia de Marabá | Marabá | 2024 Campeonato Paraense 4th place |
| Paraíba | Sousa | Sousa | 2024 Campeonato Paraibano champions |
| Paraíba | Treze | Campina Grande | 2024 Campeonato Paraibano 3rd place |
| (Paraná (state)) Paraná | FC Cascavel | Cascavel | 2024 Campeonato Paranaense 5th place |
| (Paraná (state)) Paraná | Azuriz | Marmeleiro | 2024 Campeonato Paranaense 6th place |
| (Paraná (state)) Paraná | Cianorte | Cianorte | 2024 Campeonato Paranaense 8th place |
| Pernambuco | Santa Cruz | Recife | 2024 Campeonato Pernambucano 4th place |
| Pernambuco | Central | Caruaru | 2024 Campeonato Pernambucano 5th place |
| Piauí | Altos | Altos | 2024 Campeonato Piauiense champions |
| Piauí | Parnahyba | Parnaíba | 2024 Campeonato Piauiense runners-up |
| (Rio de Janeiro (state)) Rio de Janeiro | Nova Iguaçu | Nova Iguaçu | 2024 Campeonato Carioca runners-up |
| (Rio de Janeiro (state)) Rio de Janeiro | Boavista | Saquarema | 2024 Campeonato Carioca 6th place |
| (Rio de Janeiro (state)) Rio de Janeiro | Maricá | Maricá | 2024 Copa Rio champions |
| Rio Grande do Norte | América de Natal | Natal | 2024 Campeonato Potiguar champions |
| Rio Grande do Norte | Santa Cruz de Natal | Natal | 2024 Campeonato Potiguar runners-up |
| Rio Grande do Sul | Guarany de Bagé | Bagé | 2024 Campeonato Gaúcho 5th place |
| Rio Grande do Sul | Brasil de Pelotas | Pelotas | 2024 Campeonato Gaúcho 7th place |
| Rio Grande do Sul | São Luiz | Ijuí | 2024 Campeonato Gaúcho 8th place |
| Rio Grande do Sul | São José | Porto Alegre | 2024 Campeonato Brasileiro Série C 20th place |
| Rondônia | Porto Velho | Porto Velho | 2024 Campeonato Rondoniense champions |
| Roraima | GAS | Boa Vista | 2024 Campeonato Roraimense champions |
| (Santa Catarina (state)) Santa Catarina | Barra | Balneário Camboriú | 2024 Campeonato Catarinense 4th place |
| (Santa Catarina (state)) Santa Catarina | Marcílio Dias | Itajaí | 2024 Campeonato Catarinense 5th place |
| (Santa Catarina (state)) Santa Catarina | Joinville | Joinville | 2024 Campeonato Catarinense 7th place |
| (São Paulo (state)) São Paulo | Inter de Limeira | Limeira | 2024 Campeonato Paulista 6th place |
| (São Paulo (state)) São Paulo | Portuguesa | São Paulo | 2024 Campeonato Paulista 8th place |
| (São Paulo (state)) São Paulo | Água Santa | Diadema | 2024 Campeonato Paulista 10th place |
| (São Paulo (state)) São Paulo | Monte Azul | Monte Azul Paulista | 2024 Copa Paulista champions |
| Sergipe | Sergipe | Aracaju | 2024 Campeonato Sergipano runners-up |
| Sergipe | Lagarto | Lagarto | 2024 Campeonato Sergipano 3rd place |
| Tocantins | União | Araguaína | 2024 Campeonato Tocantinense champions |
| Tocantins | Tocantinópolis | Tocantinópolis | 2024 Campeonato Tocantinense runners-up |

== Format ==
In the group stage, the 64 teams were divided into eight groups of eight organized regionally. Top four teams qualified for the round of 32. From the round of 32 on the competition was played as a knock-out tournament with each round contested over two legs.

== Group stage ==
In the group stage, each group was played on a home-and-away round-robin basis. The teams were ranked according to points (3 points for a win, 1 point for a draw, and 0 points for a loss). If tied on points, the following criteria would be used to determine the ranking: 1. Wins; 2. Goal difference; 3. Goals scored; 4. Head-to-head (if the tie was only between two teams); 5. Fewest red cards; 6. Fewest yellow cards; 7. Draw in the headquarters of the Brazilian Football Confederation (Regulations Article 16).

The top four teams qualified for the round of 32.

=== Group A1 ===
| Pos | Team | Pld | W | D | L | GF | GA | GD | Pts | Qualification | TUN | MNA | MAN | IND | AGU | TRE | GAS | HUM |
|---|---|---|---|---|---|---|---|---|---|---|---|---|---|---|---|---|---|---|
| 1 | (Pará) Tuna Luso | 14 | 8 | 3 | 3 | 24 | 10 | +14 | 27 | Advance to round of 32 | | 2–1 | 3–0 | 3–0 | 2–0 | 4–2 | 3–0 | 2–0 |
| 2 | (Amazonas (Brazilian state)) Manauara | 14 | 7 | 5 | 2 | 27 | 11 | +16 | 26 | Advance to round of 32 | 3–0 | | 2–2 | 1–1 | 0–0 | 2–0 | 3–0 | 5–0 |
| 3 | (Amazonas (Brazilian state)) Manaus | 14 | 6 | 5 | 3 | 21 | 17 | +4 | 23 | Advance to round of 32 | 2–1 | 1–1 | | 1–0 | 3–3 | 1–0 | 1–2 | 4–0 |
| 4 | (Acre (state)) Independência | 14 | 6 | 3 | 5 | 18 | 19 | −1 | 21 | Advance to round of 32 | 0–0 | 2–1 | 1–0 | | 0–2 | 2–2 | 4–1 | 0–1 |
| 5 | (Pará) Águia de Marabá | 14 | 5 | 5 | 4 | 22 | 14 | +8 | 20 | | 0–0 | 0–1 | 1–1 | 4–1 | | 0–2 | 1–0 | 6–0 |
| 6 | (Amapá) Trem | 14 | 5 | 3 | 6 | 23 | 24 | −1 | 18 | | 2–1 | 0–3 | 1–1 | 1–2 | 2–1 | | 1–3 | 5–1 |
| 7 | (Roraima) GAS | 14 | 4 | 3 | 7 | 17 | 24 | −7 | 15 | | 0–0 | 1–2 | 1–2 | 1–2 | 1–1 | 1–1 | | 2–1 |
| 8 | (Acre (state)) Humaitá | 14 | 1 | 1 | 12 | 12 | 45 | −33 | 4 | | 0–3 | 2–2 | 1–2 | 1–3 | 1–3 | 2–4 | 2–4 | |

Source: CBF
Legend: Blue = home team win; Yellow = draw; Red = away team win.
Rules for classification: 1) points; 2) wins; 3) goal difference; 4) goals scored; 5) head-to-head results (only between 2 teams); 6) fewest red cards; 7) fewest yellow cards; 8) draw.

=== Group A2 ===
| Pos | Team | Pld | W | D | L | GF | GA | GD | Pts | Qualification | ALT | IMP | SAM | MAC | IGU | TOC | PAR | MAR |
|---|---|---|---|---|---|---|---|---|---|---|---|---|---|---|---|---|---|---|
| 1 | (Piauí) Altos | 14 | 7 | 5 | 2 | 22 | 14 | +8 | 26 | Advance to round of 32 | | 1–1 | 1–1 | 0–1 | 2–1 | 1–1 | 4–2 | 1–0 |
| 2 | (Maranhão) Imperatriz | 14 | 7 | 3 | 4 | 17 | 15 | +2 | 24 | Advance to round of 32 | 0–1 | | 1–0 | 1–0 | 2–1 | 4–0 | 3–2 | 0–0 |
| 3 | (Maranhão) Sampaio Corrêa | 14 | 5 | 6 | 3 | 17 | 11 | +6 | 21 | Advance to round of 32 | 2–2 | 3–0 | | 1–1 | 1–1 | 2–0 | 1–0 | 2–0 |
| 4 | Maranhão | 14 | 4 | 7 | 3 | 18 | 12 | +6 | 19 | Advance to round of 32 | 1–1 | 3–0 | 2–0 | | 1–1 | 2–3 | 1–1 | 3–0 |
| 5 | (Ceará) Iguatu | 14 | 5 | 3 | 6 | 15 | 15 | 0 | 18 | | 2–3 | 1–0 | 1–0 | 1–0 | | 0–1 | 3–0 | 2–1 |
| 6 | (Tocantins) Tocantinópolis | 14 | 3 | 6 | 5 | 11 | 17 | −6 | 15 | | 1–0 | 1–2 | 0–0 | 1–1 | 1–1 | | 0–0 | 2–2 |
| 7 | (Piauí) Parnahyba | 14 | 3 | 5 | 6 | 16 | 22 | −6 | 14 | | 0–2 | 0–0 | 2–2 | 2–2 | 2–0 | 1–0 | | 3–2 |
| 8 | (Ceará) Maracanã | 14 | 3 | 3 | 8 | 12 | 22 | −10 | 9 (Note: STJD punished Maracanã by taking away three points due to homophobic chants from the stands during the home game against Iguatu.) | | 1–3 | 2–3 | 0–2 | 0–0 | 1–0 | 1–0 | 2–1 | |

Source: CBF
Legend: Blue = home team win; Yellow = draw; Red = away team win.
Rules for classification: 1) points; 2) wins; 3) goal difference; 4) goals scored; 5) head-to-head results (only between 2 teams); 6) fewest red cards; 7) fewest yellow cards; 8) draw.

=== Group A3 ===
| Pos | Team | Pld | W | D | L | GF | GA | GD | Pts | Qualification | AME | SAN | CEN | FER | HOR | SCN | TRE | SOU |
|---|---|---|---|---|---|---|---|---|---|---|---|---|---|---|---|---|---|---|
| 1 | (Rio Grande do Norte) América de Natal | 14 | 8 | 3 | 3 | 21 | 9 | +12 | 27 | Advance to round of 32 | | 0–0 | 0–0 | 3–2 | 2–0 | 3–0 | 4–0 | 2–0 |
| 2 | (Pernambuco) Santa Cruz | 14 | 8 | 3 | 3 | 20 | 10 | +10 | 27 | Advance to round of 32 | 2–1 | | 0–1 | 3–1 | 4–0 | 1–1 | 3–0 | 2–0 |
| 3 | (Pernambuco) Central | 14 | 7 | 5 | 2 | 15 | 7 | +8 | 26 | Advance to round of 32 | 1–2 | 1–2 | | 2–1 | 1–0 | 1–0 | 1–0 | 1–1 |
| 4 | (Ceará) Ferroviário | 14 | 5 | 3 | 6 | 15 | 19 | −4 | 18 | Advance to round of 32 | 1–0 | 3–1 | 0–0 | | 1–0 | 3–1 | 1–1 | 0–0 |
| 5 | (Ceará) Horizonte | 14 | 5 | 2 | 7 | 14 | 17 | −3 | 17 | | 0–0 | 2–0 | 1–1 | 2–0 | | 4–2 | 0–1 | 2–1 |
| 6 | (Rio Grande do Norte) Santa Cruz de Natal | 14 | 5 | 2 | 7 | 13 | 20 | −7 | 17 | | 1–2 | 0–0 | 0–2 | 1–2 | 1–0 | | 1–0 | 1–0 |
| 7 | (Paraíba) Treze | 14 | 4 | 1 | 9 | 7 | 20 | −13 | 13 | | 1–2 | 0–1 | 0–3 | 1–0 | 0–2 | 1–2 | | 1–0 |
| 8 | (Paraíba) Sousa | 14 | 3 | 3 | 8 | 11 | 14 | −3 | 12 | | 1–0 | 0–1 | 0–0 | 4–0 | 3–1 | 1–2 | 0–1 | |

Source: CBF
Legend: Blue = home team win; Yellow = draw; Red = away team win.
Rules for classification: 1) points; 2) wins; 3) goal difference; 4) goals scored; 5) head-to-head results (only between 2 teams); 6) fewest red cards; 7) fewest yellow cards; 8) draw.

=== Group A4 ===
| Pos | Team | Pld | W | D | L | GF | GA | GD | Pts | Qualification | ASA | LAG | SER | JUA | UNI | JEQ | BAR | PEN |
|---|---|---|---|---|---|---|---|---|---|---|---|---|---|---|---|---|---|---|
| 1 | (Alagoas) ASA | 14 | 9 | 4 | 1 | 27 | 8 | +19 | 31 | Advance to round of 32 | | 1–0 | 2–2 | 3–0 | 2–2 | 4–2 | 4–0 | 1–0 |
| 2 | (Sergipe) Lagarto | 14 | 7 | 2 | 5 | 20 | 16 | +4 | 23 | Advance to round of 32 | 0–0 | | 0–3 | 3–1 | 2–1 | 2–1 | 2–0 | 4–0 |
| 3 | Sergipe | 14 | 6 | 4 | 4 | 16 | 10 | +6 | 22 | Advance to round of 32 | 1–2 | 1–2 | | 0–0 | 0–0 | 1–0 | 4–1 | 2–0 |
| 4 | (Bahia) Juazeirense | 14 | 6 | 4 | 4 | 12 | 15 | −3 | 22 | Advance to round of 32 | 0–3 | 2–1 | 0–0 | | 1–0 | 2–1 | 1–1 | 1–0 |
| 5 | (Tocantins) União | 14 | 5 | 4 | 5 | 14 | 16 | −2 | 19 | | 0–4 | 1–0 | 2–0 | 1–0 | | 1–0 | 3–0 | 1–1 |
| 6 | (Bahia) Jequié | 14 | 4 | 4 | 6 | 15 | 16 | −1 | 16 | | 0–0 | 3–1 | 1–0 | 2–3 | 1–0 | | 0–0 | 0–0 |
| 7 | (Bahia) Barcelona de Ilhéus | 14 | 2 | 5 | 7 | 9 | 20 | −11 | 11 | | 1–0 | 2–2 | 0–1 | 0–1 | 4–1 | 0–0 | | 0–1 |
| 8 | (Alagoas) Penedense | 14 | 1 | 5 | 8 | 5 | 17 | −12 | 8 | | 0–1 | 0–1 | 0–1 | 0–0 | 1–1 | 2–4 | 0–0 | |

Source: CBF
Legend: Blue = home team win; Yellow = draw; Red = away team win.
Rules for classification: 1) points; 2) wins; 3) goal difference; 4) goals scored; 5) head-to-head results (only between 2 teams); 6) fewest red cards; 7) fewest yellow cards; 8) draw.

=== Group A5 ===
| Pos | Team | Pld | W | D | L | GF | GA | GD | Pts | Qualification | APA | CEI | LUV | MIX | CAP | GOI | GNE | PVE |
|---|---|---|---|---|---|---|---|---|---|---|---|---|---|---|---|---|---|---|
| 1 | (Goiás) Aparecidense | 14 | 10 | 2 | 2 | 32 | 12 | +20 | 32 | Advance to round of 32 | | 2–0 | 4–1 | 0–0 | 2–1 | 3–1 | 2–1 | 7–0 |
| 2 | (Federal District (Brazil)) Ceilândia | 14 | 8 | 4 | 2 | 23 | 14 | +9 | 28 | Advance to round of 32 | 2–3 | | 1–0 | 2–1 | 1–0 | 1–0 | 2–0 | 3–0 |
| 3 | (Mato Grosso) Luverdense | 14 | 7 | 4 | 3 | 14 | 12 | +2 | 25 | Advance to round of 32 | 3–1 | 2–2 | | 0–0 | 2–1 | 1–0 | 1–0 | 1–0 |
| 4 | (Mato Grosso) Mixto | 14 | 6 | 6 | 2 | 22 | 13 | +9 | 24 | Advance to round of 32 | 0–0 | 1–1 | 0–1 | | 1–0 | 3–0 | 3–2 | 4–3 |
| 5 | (Federal District (Brazil)) Capital | 14 | 4 | 5 | 5 | 14 | 12 | +2 | 17 | | 0–1 | 2–2 | 2–0 | 1–1 | | 0–0 | 1–1 | 3–0 |
| 6 | (Goiás) Goiânia | 14 | 2 | 4 | 8 | 12 | 22 | −10 | 10 | | 0–3 | 2–2 | 0–1 | 1–3 | 1–1 | | 0–1 | 2–0 |
| 7 | (Goiás) Goianésia | 14 | 1 | 5 | 8 | 11 | 22 | −11 | 8 | | 0–3 | 1–2 | 1–1 | 2–2 | 0–1 | 1–3 | | 1–1 |
| 8 | (Rondônia) Porto Velho | 14 | 1 | 4 | 9 | 9 | 30 | −21 | 7 | | 3–1 | 0–2 | 0–0 | 0–3 | 0–1 | 2–2 | 0–0 | |

Source: CBF
Legend: Blue = home team win; Yellow = draw; Red = away team win.
Rules for classification: 1) points; 2) wins; 3) goal difference; 4) goals scored; 5) head-to-head results (only between 2 teams); 6) fewest red cards; 7) fewest yellow cards; 8) draw.

=== Group A6 ===
| Pos | Team | Pld | W | D | L | GF | GA | GD | Pts | Qualification | POR | RBR | AGS | MAR | POU | PVI | NIG | BOA |
|---|---|---|---|---|---|---|---|---|---|---|---|---|---|---|---|---|---|---|
| 1 | (São Paulo (state)) Portuguesa | 14 | 9 | 3 | 2 | 22 | 13 | +9 | 30 | Advance to round of 32 | | 2–1 | 2–1 | 2–1 | 2–1 | 2–1 | 1–0 | 3–0 |
| 2 | (Espírito Santo) Rio Branco | 14 | 8 | 2 | 4 | 19 | 9 | +10 | 26 | Advance to round of 32 | 0–0 | | 3–2 | 3–0 | 3–0 | 2–0 | 0–1 | 2–0 |
| 3 | (São Paulo (state)) Água Santa | 14 | 6 | 3 | 5 | 20 | 18 | +2 | 21 | Advance to round of 32 | 2–1 | 1–2 | | 1–1 | 2–3 | 0–0 | 2–1 | 2–0 |
| 4 | (Rio de Janeiro (state)) Maricá | 14 | 5 | 4 | 5 | 14 | 14 | 0 | 19 | Advance to round of 32 | 0–1 | 2–0 | 0–1 | | 1–0 | 2–1 | 1–1 | 1–0 |
| 5 | (Minas Gerais) Pouso Alegre | 14 | 5 | 2 | 7 | 13 | 18 | −5 | 17 | | 2–0 | 1–0 | 0–2 | 1–1 | | 1–1 | 1–0 | 2–0 |
| 6 | (Espírito Santo) Porto Vitória | 14 | 4 | 5 | 5 | 14 | 13 | +1 | 17 | | 1–3 | 0–1 | 2–0 | 0–0 | 3–0 | | 1–1 | 2–0 |
| 7 | (Rio de Janeiro (state)) Nova Iguaçu | 14 | 3 | 6 | 5 | 13 | 16 | −3 | 15 | | 1–1 | 0–0 | 1–2 | 1–3 | 2–1 | 1–1 | | 2–1 |
| 8 | (Rio de Janeiro (state)) Boavista | 14 | 2 | 3 | 9 | 9 | 23 | −14 | 9 | | 2–2 | 0–2 | 2–2 | 2–1 | 1–0 | 0–1 | 1–1 | |

Source: CBF
Legend: Blue = home team win; Yellow = draw; Red = away team win.
Rules for classification: 1) points; 2) wins; 3) goal difference; 4) goals scored; 5) head-to-head results (only between 2 teams); 6) fewest red cards; 7) fewest yellow cards; 8) draw.

=== Group A7 ===
| Pos | Team | Pld | W | D | L | GF | GA | GD | Pts | Qualification | INT | CIA | GOI | FCC | UBE | MON | OPE | ITA |
|---|---|---|---|---|---|---|---|---|---|---|---|---|---|---|---|---|---|---|
| 1 | (São Paulo (state)) Inter de Limeira | 14 | 9 | 3 | 2 | 21 | 7 | +14 | 30 | Advance to round of 32 | | 2–0 | 0–1 | 1–0 | 1–0 | 1–1 | 5–1 | 3–1 |
| 2 | (Paraná (state)) Cianorte | 14 | 6 | 4 | 4 | 22 | 17 | +5 | 22 | Advance to round of 32 | 0–0 | | 2–3 | 3–0 | 3–2 | 2–0 | 1–0 | 3–1 |
| 3 | (Goiás) Goiatuba | 14 | 6 | 4 | 4 | 21 | 16 | +5 | 22 | Advance to round of 32 | 1–3 | 3–1 | | 0–0 | 1–1 | 1–1 | 2–0 | 0–0 |
| 4 | (Paraná (state)) FC Cascavel | 14 | 5 | 6 | 3 | 15 | 15 | 0 | 21 | Advance to round of 32 | 2–0 | 2–1 | 1–4 | | 2–1 | 1–1 | 3–1 | 1–1 |
| 5 | (Minas Gerais) Uberlândia | 14 | 4 | 4 | 6 | 21 | 20 | +1 | 16 | | 0–3 | 1–1 | 2–1 | 1–1 | | 2–0 | 2–3 | 4–0 |
| 6 | (São Paulo (state)) Monte Azul | 14 | 3 | 5 | 6 | 13 | 18 | −5 | 14 | | 0–1 | 1–1 | 3–2 | 0–1 | 2–1 | | 1–2 | 0–1 |
| 7 | (Mato Grosso do Sul) Operário | 14 | 3 | 5 | 6 | 13 | 22 | −9 | 14 | | 0–1 | 0–2 | 2–1 | 0–0 | 1–1 | 1–1 | | 1–1 |
| 8 | (Minas Gerais) Itabirito | 14 | 1 | 7 | 6 | 11 | 22 | −11 | 10 | | 0–0 | 2–2 | 0–1 | 1–1 | 1–3 | 1–2 | 1–1 | |

Source: CBF
Legend: Blue = home team win; Yellow = draw; Red = away team win.
Rules for classification: 1) points; 2) wins; 3) goal difference; 4) goals scored; 5) head-to-head results (only between 2 teams); 6) fewest red cards; 7) fewest yellow cards; 8) draw.

=== Group A8 ===
| Pos | Team | Pld | W | D | L | GF | GA | GD | Pts | Qualification | BAR | SJO | JEC | MDI | GUA | BRA | SLU | AZU |
|---|---|---|---|---|---|---|---|---|---|---|---|---|---|---|---|---|---|---|
| 1 | (Santa Catarina (state)) Barra | 14 | 8 | 2 | 4 | 20 | 10 | +10 | 26 | Advance to round of 32 | | 1–1 | 1–0 | 2–1 | 3–0 | 0–1 | 3–0 | 1–0 |
| 2 | (Rio Grande do Sul) São José | 14 | 7 | 5 | 2 | 21 | 11 | +10 | 26 | Advance to round of 32 | 3–3 | | 1–1 | 1–1 | 0–1 | 1–0 | 3–0 | 1–0 |
| 3 | (Santa Catarina (state)) Joinville | 14 | 6 | 3 | 5 | 11 | 11 | 0 | 21 | Advance to round of 32 | 2–1 | 0–2 | | 1–1 | 1–0 | 1–0 | 2–1 | 1–0 |
| 4 | (Santa Catarina (state)) Marcílio Dias | 14 | 5 | 6 | 3 | 17 | 15 | +2 | 21 | Advance to round of 32 | 1–0 | 0–0 | 1–0 | | 1–1 | 1–2 | 3–0 | 1–0 |
| 5 | (Rio Grande do Sul) Guarany de Bagé | 14 | 5 | 4 | 5 | 11 | 14 | −3 | 19 | | 0–2 | 1–0 | 2–1 | 3–3 | | 1–0 | 2–1 | 0–1 |
| 6 | (Rio Grande do Sul) Brasil de Pelotas | 14 | 5 | 1 | 8 | 11 | 12 | −1 | 16 | | 1–0 | 1–3 | 1–0 | 1–2 | 0–0 | | 0–1 | 4–0 |
| 7 | (Rio Grande do Sul) São Luiz | 14 | 4 | 1 | 9 | 10 | 20 | −10 | 13 | | 0–2 | 1–2 | 0–1 | 3–0 | 1–0 | 1–0 | | 1–2 |
| 8 | (Paraná (state)) Azuriz | 14 | 3 | 4 | 7 | 6 | 14 | −8 | 13 | | 0–1 | 1–3 | 0–0 | 1–1 | 0–0 | 1–0 | 0–0 | |

Source: CBF
Legend: Blue = home team win; Yellow = draw; Red = away team win.
Rules for classification: 1) points; 2) wins; 3) goal difference; 4) goals scored; 5) head-to-head results (only between 2 teams); 6) fewest red cards; 7) fewest yellow cards; 8) draw.

== Final stages ==
The final stages were played on a home-and-away two-legged basis. For the round of 16, semi-finals and finals, the best-overall-performance team hosted the second leg. If tied on aggregate, the away goals rule would not be used, extra time would not be played, and the penalty shoot-out would be used to determine the winners (Regulations Article 20).

For the quarter-finals, teams were seeded based on the table of results of all matches in the competition. The top four seeded teams hosted the second leg.

The four quarter-finals winners were promoted to 2026 Série C.

=== Round of 32 ===
The round of 32 was a two-legged knockout tie, with the draw regionalised. The matches were played from 2 to 10 August.

==== Matches ====
| Team 1 | Agg. | Team 2 | 1st leg | 2nd leg |
|---|---|---|---|---|
| Maranhão | 4–3 | (Pará) Tuna Luso | 4–1 | 0–2 |
| Manaus (Amazonas (Brazilian state)) | 2–2 (3–5 p) | (Maranhão) Imperatriz | 0–2 | 2–0 |
| Independência (Acre (state)) | 2–8 | (Piauí) Altos | 1–5 | 1–3 |
| Sampaio Corrêa (Maranhão) | 1–2 | (Amazonas (Brazilian state)) Manauara | 1–1 | 0–1 |
| Juazeirense (Bahia) | 1–3 | (Rio Grande do Norte) América de Natal | 1–1 | 0–2 |
| Central (Pernambuco) | 3–2 | (Sergipe) Lagarto | 1–0 | 2–2 |
| Ferroviário (Ceará) | 0–3 | (Alagoas) ASA | 0–1 | 0–2 |
| Sergipe | 3–3 (4–5 p) | (Pernambuco) Santa Cruz | 2–1 | 1–2 |
| Maricá (Rio de Janeiro (state)) | 3–4 | (Goiás) Aparecidense | 1–2 | 2–2 |
| Luverdense (Mato Grosso) | 0–3 | (Espírito Santo) Rio Branco | 0–0 | 0–3 |
| Mixto (Mato Grosso) | 1–1 (4–3 p) | (São Paulo (state)) Portuguesa | 1–0 | 0–1 |
| Água Santa (São Paulo (state)) | 1–2 | (Federal District (Brazil)) Ceilândia | 1–1 | 0–1 |
| Marcílio Dias (Santa Catarina (state)) | 1–2 | (São Paulo (state)) Inter de Limeira | 0–0 | 1–2 |
| Goiatuba (Goiás) | 3–2 | (Rio Grande do Sul) São José | 1–1 | 2–1 |
| FC Cascavel (Paraná (state)) | 0–4 | (Santa Catarina (state)) Barra | 0–1 | 0–3 |
| Joinville (Santa Catarina (state)) | 1–5 | (Paraná (state)) Cianorte | 1–1 | 0–4 |

=== Round of 16 ===
The matches were played from 16 to 24 August.

==== Matches ====
| Team 1 | Agg. | Team 2 | 1st leg | 2nd leg |
|---|---|---|---|---|
| Maranhão | 2–1 | (Pernambuco) Central | 2–1 | 0–0 |
| Imperatriz (Maranhão) | 0–1 | (Rio Grande do Norte) América de Natal | 0–1 | 0–0 |
| Santa Cruz (Pernambuco) | 1–1 (3–1 p) | (Piauí) Altos | 1–1 | 0–0 |
| Manauara (Amazonas (Brazilian state)) | 0–1 | (Alagoas) ASA | 0–1 | 0–0 |
| Goiatuba (Goiás) | 4–3 | (Goiás) Aparecidense | 2–3 | 2–0 |
| Rio Branco (Espírito Santo) | 0–1 | (São Paulo (state)) Inter de Limeira | 0–1 | 0–0 |
| Cianorte (Paraná (state)) | 3–1 | (Mato Grosso) Mixto | 1–1 | 2–0 |
| Ceilândia (Federal District (Brazil)) | 1–2 | (Santa Catarina (state)) Barra | 1–1 | 0–1 |

=== Quarter-finals ===
The draw for the quarter-finals were seeded based on the table of results of all matches in the competition for the qualifying teams. The teams were ranked according to points. If tied on points, the following criteria would be used to determine the ranking: 1. Wins; 2. Goal difference; 3. Goals scored; 4. Fewest red cards; 5. Fewest yellow cards; 6. Draw in the headquarters of the Brazilian Football Confederation (Regulations Article 18).

==== Quarter-finals seedings ====
| Seed | Team | Pts | W | GD |
|---|---|---|---|---|
| 1 | (Alagoas) ASA | 41 | 12 | +23 |
| 2 | (São Paulo (state)) Inter de Limeira | 38 | 11 | +16 |
| 3 | (Santa Catarina (state)) Barra | 36 | 11 | +15 |
| 4 | (Rio Grande do Norte) América de Natal | 35 | 10 | +15 |
| 5 | (Pernambuco) Santa Cruz | 32 | 9 | +10 |
| 6 | (Paraná (state)) Cianorte | 30 | 8 | +11 |
| 7 | (Goiás) Goiatuba | 29 | 8 | +7 |
| 8 | Maranhão | 26 | 6 | +8 |

==== Matches ====
The matches were played from 30 August to 7 September.

| Team 1 | Agg. | Team 2 | 1st leg | 2nd leg |
|---|---|---|---|---|
| Maranhão | 4–0 | (Alagoas) ASA | 1–0 | 3–0 |
| Santa Cruz (Pernambuco) | 2–1 | (Rio Grande do Norte) América de Natal | 1–0 | 1–1 |
| Goiatuba (Goiás) | 0–1 | (São Paulo (state)) Inter de Limeira | 0–0 | 0–1 |
| Cianorte (Paraná (state)) | 0–1 | (Santa Catarina (state)) Barra | 0–0 | 0–1 |

=== Semi-finals ===
The matches were played from 13 to 20 September.

==== Matches ====
| Team 1 | Agg. | Team 2 | 1st leg | 2nd leg |
|---|---|---|---|---|
| Maranhão | 0–1 | (Pernambuco) Santa Cruz | 0–1 | 0–0 |
| Barra (Santa Catarina (state)) | 5–2 | (São Paulo (state)) Inter de Limeira | 2–0 | 3–2 |

=== Finals ===
The matches were played on 27 September and 4 October.

==== Matches ====
| Team 1 | Agg. | Team 2 | 1st leg | 2nd leg |
|---|---|---|---|---|
| Santa Cruz (Pernambuco) | 1–2 | (Santa Catarina (state)) Barra | 1–2 | 0–0 |

27 September 2025
17:00

| Santa Cruz (Pernambuco) | 1–2 | (Santa Catarina (state)) Barra |
|---|---|---|
| Renato 30' | Report | Elvinho 37'; Renan Bernabé 61' |

Arena Pernambuco, São Lourenço da Mata
Attendance: 45,500
Referee: Fernando Antônio Mendes de Salles Nascimento Filho (Pará)

4 October 2025
16:00

| Barra (Santa Catarina (state)) | 0–0 | (Pernambuco) Santa Cruz |
|---|---|---|
| | Report |

Arena Barra FC, Itajaí
Referee: Alex Gomes Stefano (Rio de Janeiro)

== Top goalscorers ==
| Rank | Player | Team | Goals |
|---|---|---|---|
| 1 | (Brazil) Ronaldy | (Pará) Tuna Luso | 10 |
| 2 | (Brazil) Giovane Gomes | (Rio Grande do Sul) São José | 9 |
| 2 | (Brazil) Marcelo Toscano | (Alagoas) ASA | 9 |
| 2 | (Brazil) Renan Bernabé | (Santa Catarina (state)) Barra | 9 |
| 5 | (Brazil) Ciel | (Ceará) Ferroviário | 8 |
| 5 | (Brazil) Diego Fernandes | (Espírito Santo) Rio Branco | 8 |
| 5 | (Brazil) Jonas Moreira | (Amapá) Trem | 8 |
| 5 | (Brazil) Júnior Mandacaru | (Piauí) Altos | 8 |

Source: CBF
