= Barra Futebol Clube (SC) =

Barra
- Full name: Barra Futebol Clube
- Nickname: Pescador (Fisherman)
- Founded: 18 January 2013; 13 years ago
- Ground: Arena Barra FC, Itajaí
- Capacity: 5,500
- President: Benê Sobrinho
- Head coach: Evaristo Piza
- League: Campeonato Brasileiro Série C Campeonato Catarinense
- 2025 2025: Série D, 1st of 64 (champions); Catarinense, 9th of 12
| Home colours | Away colours | Third colours |

Barra Futebol Clube, usually known as Barra or Barra-SC, is a Brazilian football club from Balneário Camboriú, Santa Catarina.

The club was initially notable due to holding the federative rights of some players, like Yann Rolim, Guilherme Biteco and deceased Matheus Biteco.

== History ==
Founded in 2013 by a number of businessmen, Barra played in the Campeonato Catarinense Série C in their first three seasons, achieving promotion in 2015. In the 2021 Campeonato Catarinense Série B, the club achieved a first-ever promotion to the Campeonato Catarinense as champions with an unbeaten status.

In their campaign in the first division, Barra managed to avoid relegation, and finished fourth in the 2023 edition, qualifying to the 2024 Série D for the first time ever.

In 2025, after another fourth place in the previous year's Catarinense, Barra inaugurated a stadium (Arena Barra FC) and a training ground. Despite only finishing ninth in the state league, the club achieved promotion to the Série C on 6 September, after defeating Cianorte in the quarterfinals.

On 4 October 2025, Barra became champions of the Série D after a 2–1 aggregate win over Santa Cruz; with 12 years of existence, the club became the second-youngest to win the fourth division, only behind Retrô.

== Current squad ==
As of 1 September 2026

Note: Flags indicate national team as defined under FIFA eligibility rules; some limited exceptions apply. Players may hold more than one non-FIFA nationality.

| No. | Pos. | Nation | Player |
|---|---|---|---|
| — | GK | BRA | Matheus Keyser (on loan from Brasiliense) |
| — | GK | BRA | Luiz Fabiano |
| — | GK | BRA | Fabian Volpi |
| — | DF | BRA | Éverton Alemão |
| — | DF | BRA | Léo Duarte |
| — | DF | BRA | Jackson |
| — | DF | BRA | Jean Pierre |
| — | DF | BRA | Gabriel Jesus |
| — | DF | BRA | Kayque |
| — | DF | BRA | Guilherme Lazaroni |
| — | DF | BRA | Da Rocha |
| — | DF | BRA | Vavá |
| — | DF | BRA | Vitão |
| — | DF | BRA | João Vinícius (on loan from Novo Hamburgo) |
| — | DF | BRA | Augusto Potiguar |
| — | MF | BRA | Barba |
| — | MF | BRA | Matheus Barbosa |
| — | MF | BRA | Marquinho |

| No. | Pos. | Nation | Player |
|---|---|---|---|
| — | MF | BRA | Gaudencio |
| — | MF | BRA | Pedro Peçanha (on loan from Cascavel) |
| — | MF | BRA | Esquerdinha |
| — | MF | BRA | Elvinho |
| — | MF | BRA | Rick |
| — | MF | BRA | Warley |
| — | FW | BRA | Giovani Albuquerque |
| — | FW | BRA | Renan Bernabé |
| — | FW | BRA | Betinho (on loan from Horizonte) |
| — | FW | BRA | Marcelinho (on loan from Tombense) |
| — | FW | BRA | Matheuzinho (on loan from Camboriú) |
| — | FW | BRA | Nicolas |
| — | FW | BRA | Vinícius Popó (on loan from Capivariano) |
| — | FW | BRA | Saymon |
| — | FW | BRA | Cléo Silva |
| — | FW | BRA | Gabriel Silva |
| — | FW | BRA | Lucas Vargas |

=== Out on loan ===
Note: Flags indicate national team as defined under FIFA eligibility rules; some limited exceptions apply. Players may hold more than one non-FIFA nationality.

| No. | Pos. | Nation | Player |
|---|---|---|---|
| — | GK | BRA | Ewerton (at (Portugal) Académico Viseu until 30 June 2027) |
| — | MF | BRA | Natan Costa (at Floresta until 31 December 2026) |
| — | MF | BRA | Caíke (at Cianorte until 31 December 2026) |

| No. | Pos. | Nation | Player |
|---|---|---|---|
| — | MF | BRA | Lucas Nunes (at Paraná until 31 December 2026) |
| — | FW | BRA | Felipe Rodrigues (at São José until 31 December 2026) |

== Honours ==
=== Official tournaments ===
National
| Competitions | Titles | Seasons |
|---|---|---|
| Campeonato Brasileiro Série D | 1 | 2025 |
State
| Competitions | Titles | Seasons |
| Campeonato Catarinense | 1 | 2026 |
| Campeonato Catarinense Série B | 1 | 2021 |
| Campeonato Catarinense Série C | 1 | 2015 |
