= Içara =

Içara - SC
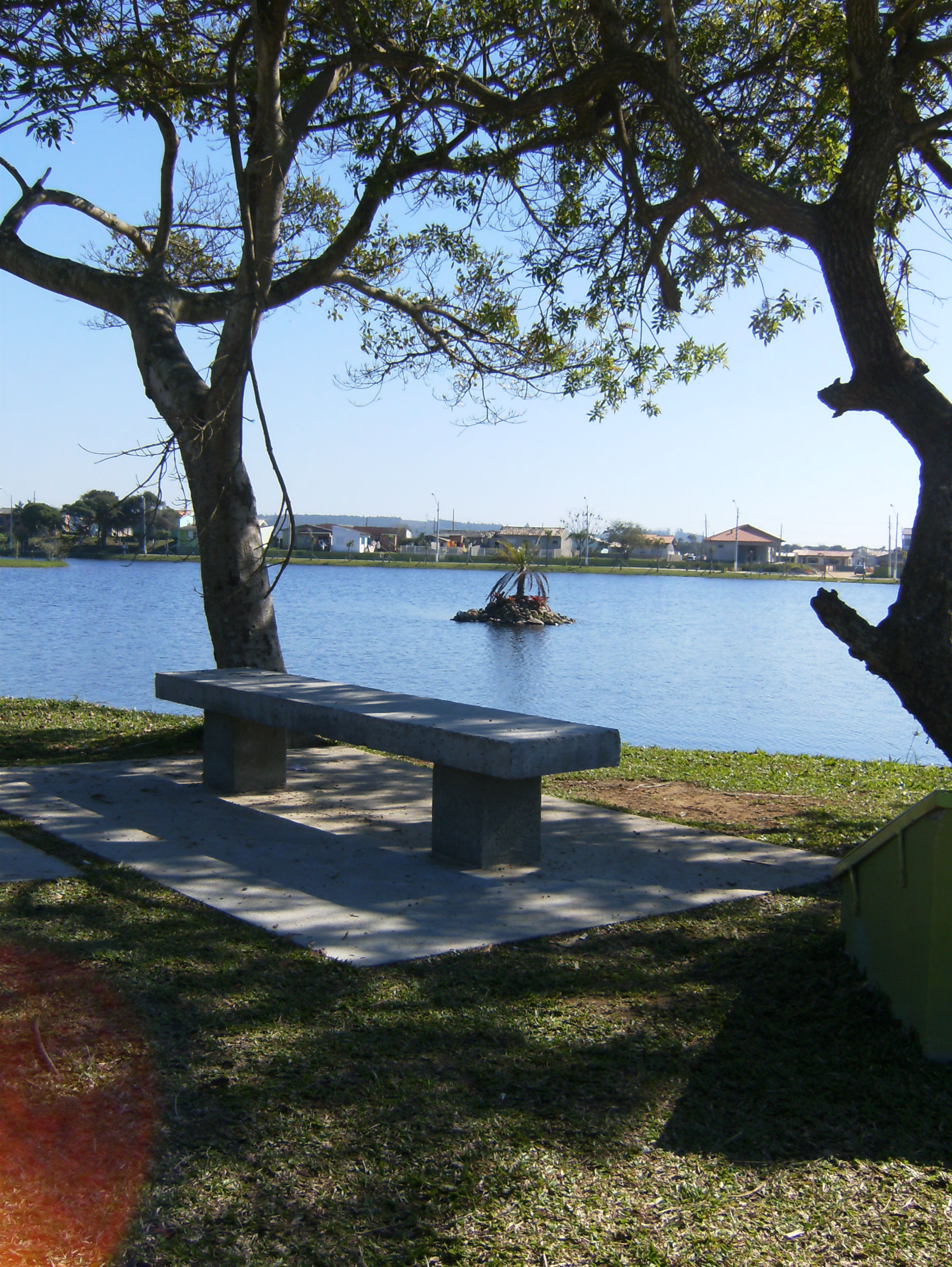

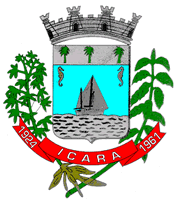
- Flag Coat of arms

- Location within Brazil
- Coordinates: 28°42′48″S 49°18′00″W
- Country: Brazil
- State: Santa Catarina
- Founded: January 6, 1880

Area
  - Total: 230.393 km^{2} (88.955 sq mi)

Population (2020)
  - Total: 57,247

Içara is a city in the Brazilian state of Santa Catarina. It is located 170 km south of Florianópolis, the state capital and around 890 km south of São Paulo. It is the Brazilian capital of the honey and tobacco industries, but is also very strong in plastic, ceramic tiles and chemicals.

Nearby cities are Siderópolis, Cocal do Sul, Morro da Fumaça, Maracajá, Araranguá, Nova Veneza, Forquilhinha and Criciuma.

Several small towns lie around Içara forming a metropolitan area of 250 thousand people. The most important are:

- Criciuma (larger city)
- Urussanga
- Nova Veneza
- Nova Trento
- Siderópolis
- Orleans
- Araranguá
- Timbe do Sul

== Notable people ==
- Jean Coral (born 1988), Brazilian footballer
- Kathiê Librelato (born 1988), Chess player
