= Criciúma =

Municipality in Santa Catarina, Brazil

- Municipality
- Municipality of Criciúma
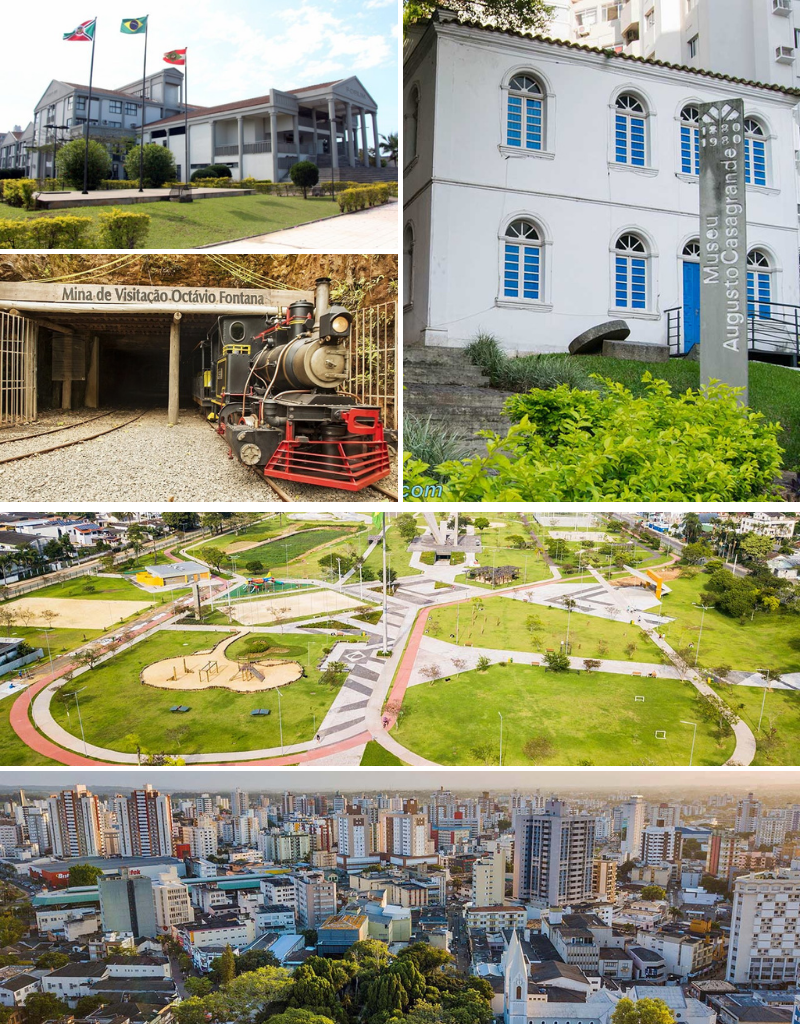

- Flag Coat of arms

- Location in Brazil

- Location within Brazil
- Coordinates: 28°40′40″S 49°22′12″W
- Country: Brazil
- Region: South
- State: Santa Catarina
- Founded: January 6, 1880

Government
  - Mayor: Vaguinho Espíndola (PSDB)

Area
  - Total: 235.628 km^{2} (90.976 sq mi)
- Elevation: 46 m (151 ft)

Population (2022 Brazilian census)
  - Total: 214,493
  - Estimate (2025): 227,438
  - Density: 910.304/km^{2} (2,357.68/sq mi)
- Time zone: UTC-3 (UTC-3)
- HDI (2010): 0.788 – high
- Website: criciuma.sc.gov.br

Criciúma (Portuguese pronunciation: [kɾisiˈumɐ]) is a city in the Brazilian state of Santa Catarina. At 28°40′39″S 49°22′11″W, it is located 180 km south of Florianópolis, the state capital and around 900 km south of São Paulo. The city is the center of Brazil's flooring and home materials industry, and is the second-largest such center in the world.

== City data ==
- Foundation: 214 493 (2022 estimate)
- Area: 209,8 km^{2}
- Nearby cities: Siderópolis, Cocal do Sul, Morro da Fumaça, Maracajá, Araranguá, Nova Veneza, Forquilhinha, Içara

The city was founded on January 6, 1880, by Italian immigrants. It has an approximate population of 213,000 inhabitants, and an area of 209.8 km². In April 2004, Criciúma was affected by a tropical cyclone, a phenomenon unheard of in recent South Atlantic history, which caused some damage.

It is the Brazilian capital of coal and ceramic tiles, but also very strong in plastic, textiles (jeans), and chemicals.

Criciúma is 24 km inland from the Atlantic Ocean (Rincão beach) and around 40 km from the mountains of the interior of Santa Catarina state.

Criciúma is also the name of the city's football (soccer) team, which plays in the national league. They have won several championship titles, including a national championship in 1991 (Copa do Brasil). Their colors are white, black and yellow, symbols of the state mineral resources, mainly coal.

Several small towns lie around Criciúma forming a metropolitan area of 250 thousand people. The most important are: Içara (a major producer of honey), Urussanga, Nova Veneza, Siderópolis, Orleans and Araranguá.

The city is the seat of the Roman Catholic Diocese of Criciúma. Criciuma's cathedral is Catedral São José.

According to IBGE statistics for 2014, it has 211,369 inhabitants, being the main city of the Carboniferous Metropolitan Region, which has about 600 thousand inhabitants, besides being the most populous city of South Catarinense, the seventh largest in the state of Santa Catarina and the 22nd in the Southern Region of Brazil. Under the Unified Health System, the SUS, Criciúma houses more than 252 thousand registered. It is among the 100 municipalities in Brazil with the best Human Development Index (HDI), calculated as 0.788 in 2010, being the 76th most well-rated municipality in the country and the 14th best evaluated in Santa Catarina that year.

The city is an industrial center in several sectors, among them: confection, packaging, ceramic, plastic and disposable, metalworking, extraction of coal, civil construction and graphic material.

With headquarters in Criciúma, Rede Angeloni is the largest supermarket chain in Santa Catarina and the 10th largest in the country, with 27 stores spread throughout Brazil, the largest hypermarket in the network is located in Criciúma. In addition to having 3 malls, in the service sector - health and education - stands out with three hospitals, two 24-hour care units, the University of Extremo Sul Catarinense, Federal Institute of Santa Catarina and seven other colleges.

Known for being the Brazilian Capital of Coal and Ceramic Coating. In its subsoil it harbors one of the largest mineral reserves of the country. The Visitation Mine Octávio Fontana, allows a view of the historical evolution of the extractive wealth of the city. Colonized by Italians, the city also received Poles, Germans, Portuguese and Arabs at various stages of its development.

Among so many popular festivals that take place in the South, one of them is in Criciúma. The Festival of Ethnicities, which in the first editions was named Quermesse for being held in Nereu Ramos Square, next to St. Joseph's Cathedral, brings together all the ethnic traditions of the region and has as main objectives to promote the manifestations and to integrate the colonizers of Criciúma, thus passing on their cultural history.

== Transportation ==
Criciúma is served by Diomício Freitas Airport located in the adjoining municipality of Forquilhinha and Humberto Ghizzo Bortoluzzi Regional Airport located in Jaguaruna.

== Notable people ==
- Valdomiro, football player
- Patric, football player
- Paulinho Criciúma, football player
- Tonho Gil, coach and former footballer
- Airton Souza, coach and former footballer
- Rafael, football player
- Rafaela Ferreira, racing driver

== Twin towns – sister cities ==
Criciúma is twinned with:

- Huaibei, China
- Vittorio Veneto, Italy

== Climate ==
Climate data for Urussanga (1981–2010)
Month	Jan	Feb	Mar	Apr	May	Jun	Jul	Aug	Sep	Oct	Nov	Dec	Year
Mean daily maximum °C (°F)	29.8 (85.6)	30.0 (86.0)	29.1 (84.4)	26.8 (80.2)	23.6 (74.5)	22.1 (71.8)	21.4 (70.5)	23.3 (73.9)	23.5 (74.3)	25.1 (77.2)	27.4 (81.3)	28.9 (84.0)	25.9 (78.6)
Daily mean °C (°F)	24.0 (75.2)	24.1 (75.4)	23.1 (73.6)	20.6 (69.1)	17.0 (62.6)	15.3 (59.5)	14.8 (58.6)	15.9 (60.6)	17.3 (63.1)	19.3 (66.7)	21.5 (70.7)	22.9 (73.2)	19.7 (67.5)
Mean daily minimum °C (°F)	19.3 (66.7)	19.5 (67.1)	18.5 (65.3)	15.8 (60.4)	12.2 (54.0)	10.6 (51.1)	10.1 (50.2)	10.6 (51.1)	12.1 (53.8)	14.3 (57.7)	16.3 (61.3)	18.0 (64.4)	14.8 (58.6)
Average precipitation mm (inches)	191.8 (7.55)	179.3 (7.06)	188.9 (7.44)	108.8 (4.28)	157.6 (6.20)	66.7 (2.63)	120.6 (4.75)	110.0 (4.33)	122.4 (4.82)	129.5 (5.10)	150.5 (5.93)	157.7 (6.21)	1,683.8 (66.29)
Average precipitation days (≥ 1.0 mm)	12	14	12	9	9	7	9	7	10	11	11	11	122
Average relative humidity (%)	81.3	83.5	85.1	85.5	87.2	87.6	86.7	82.8	82.1	81.5	80.3	80.5	83.7
Mean monthly sunshine hours	163.3	150.5	165.4	154.8	147.7	122.0	133.3	147.5	133.5	151.1	162.1	166.3	1,797.5
Source: Instituto Nacional de Meteorologia
