= Aldo Baldin =

Brazilian tenor

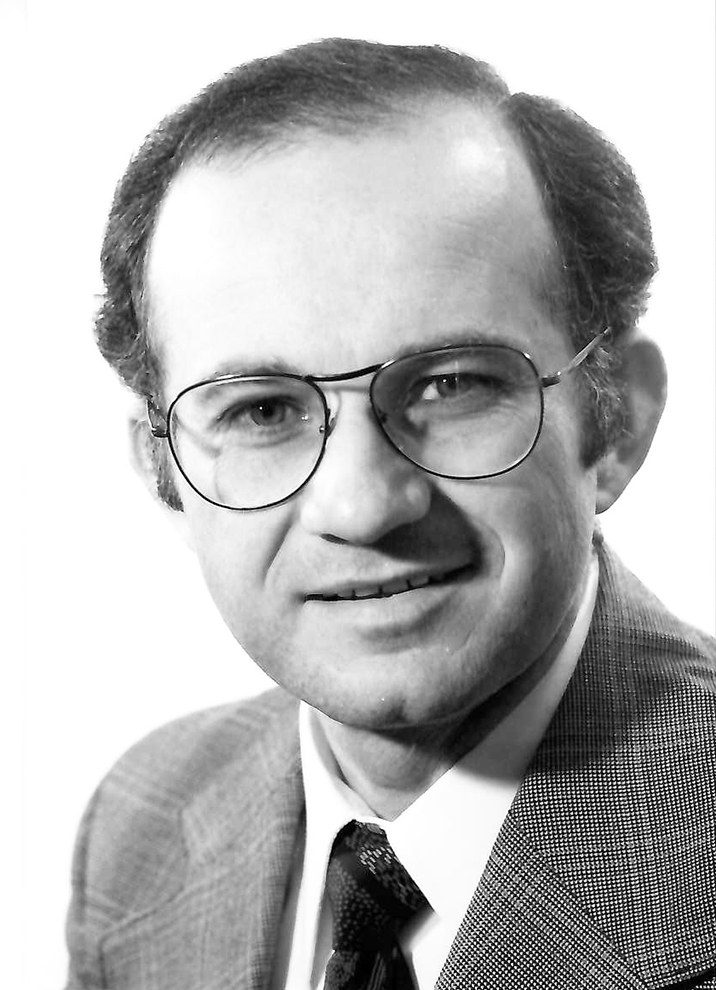
- Aldo Baldin in 1980
- Born: January 1, 1945; Urussanga, Santa Catarina, Brazil
- Died: January 5, 1994 (aged 49); Waldbronn, Germany
- Occupations: Tenor; Academic teacher
- Organizations: Mannheim National Theatre; Teatro Colón; Internationale Bachakademie Stuttgart; Hochschule für Musik Karlsruhe
- Awards: Cruz e Sousa Cultural Merit Medal (in memoriam) - Santa Catarina, Brazil (2016)

Signature
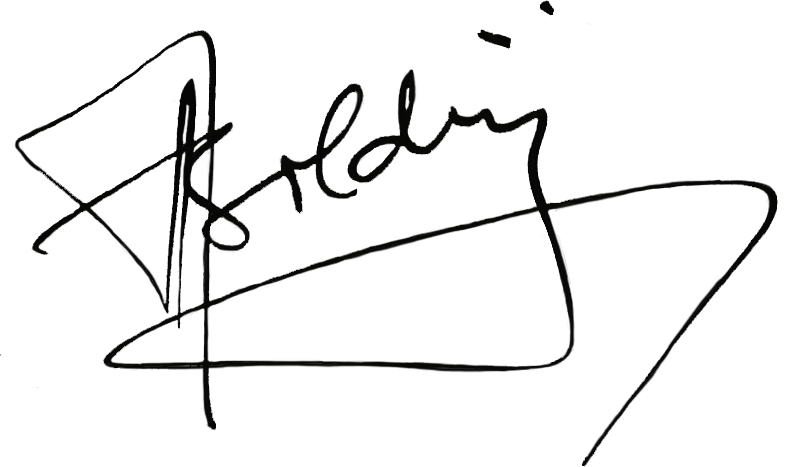

Aldo Baldin (January 1, 1945 - January 5, 1994) was a Brazilian classical tenor, known for his interpretations of music by Johann Sebastian Bach. He performed internationally and made many recordings. He was professor of voice at the Hochschule für Musik Karlsruhe.

== Education ==
Aldo Baldin was born in Urussanga, Santa Catarina. A child prodigy in music, he was awarded a scholarship in Brazil for studies in piano and cello. He learned singing with Heloisa Nemoto Vergara and cello with Jean-Jacques Pagnot at the Music School of the Federal University of Rio Grande do Sul (UFRGS) in Porto Alegre. He graduated in vocal studies alongside Roberto Miranda and Eliane Sampaio from the Federal University of Rio de Janeiro.

Conductor Karl Richter was instrumental in securing a scholarship from DAAD for Baldin to study with Martin Gründler at the Musikhochschule Frankfurt, where he received a Performing Arts degree. He continued to study with Margarethe von Winterfeldt in Berlin and participated in summer courses with Conchita Badia and Noemi Perugia in Paris.

== Singing career ==
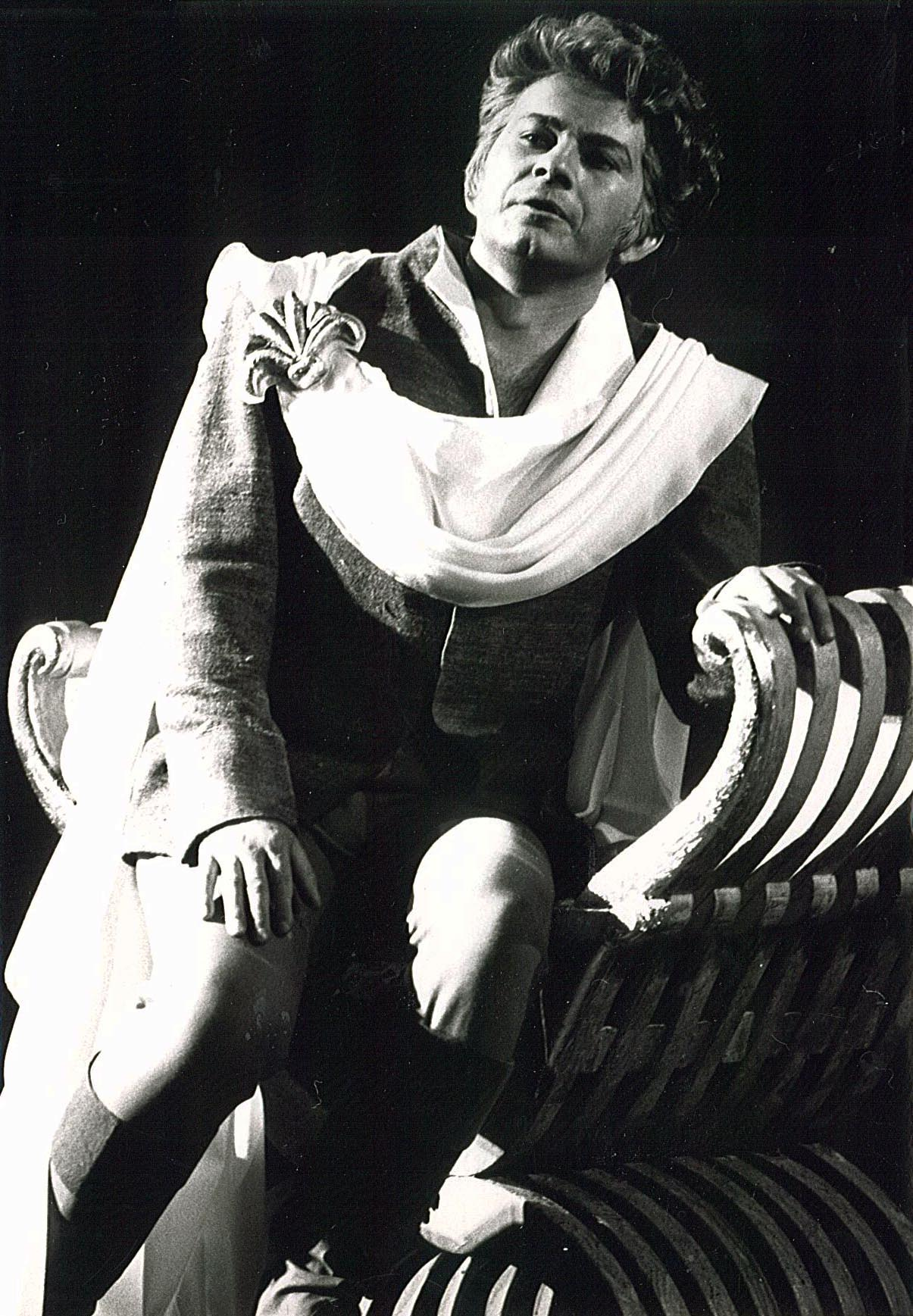
Baldin in the role of Idamantes in Morart's Idomeneo

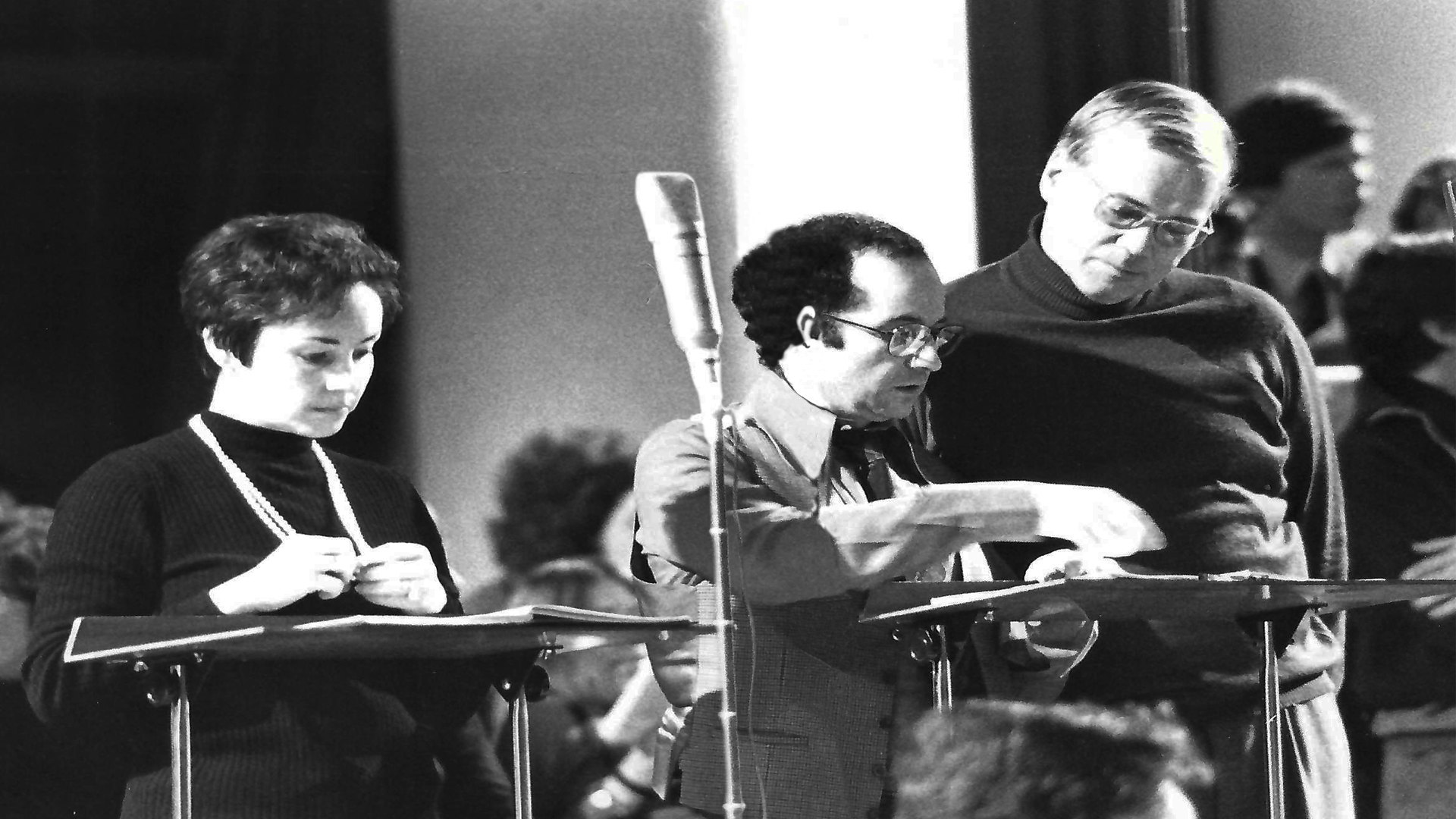
Edith Mathis, Baldin and Dietrich Fischer-Dieskau recording Haydn's Die Schöpfung (London, 1980)

While still studying, Baldin was already active as a concert and oratorio soloist and Lied interpreter and was also in demand as a recording artist for radio and record companies.

His career as an opera singer began at the Pfalztheater in Kaiserslautern, in 1975, and soon led to the Mannheim National Theatre. In 1980, he debuted at the Teatro Colón in Buenos Aires and, in 1981, at the Teatro alla Scala in Milan. He was also hired as a guest performer at the Deutsche Oper Berlin and at other internationally known opera houses. He undertook extended concert tours, which brought him to France, Holland, Italy, Portugal, Spain, Switzerland, Israel, Russia, Poland, Czech Republic, Latvia, Iceland, the US and South America. He worked with conductors such as Sir Neville Marriner, Helmuth Rilling, Herbert von Karajan, Rolf Beck, Karl Richter, Isaac Karabtchevsky and Peter Schreier. With Neville Marriner, Baldin recorded Haydn's Die Schöpfung (Philips Records - 1981 Grammy Winner) and Mozart's Die Zauberflöte and Le nozze di Figaro (Philips - 1986 Grammy Nomination).

The great versatility of his voice enabled him to perform music from the Renaissance to contemporary. In opera, he focused on Mozart, Donizetti and Rossini; in concert, he focused on Bach's music, particularly the role of the Evangelist, but also works by Haydn, Mozart, Beethoven, Bruckner, Rossini and Verdi. Baldin's song repertoire covers not only German Lieder, but also the Spanish, Italian, and French literature, as well as songs by contemporary Brazilian composers.

== Concert Repertoire ==
Composer	Works
Johann F. Agricola	Christmas Cantata
Johann S. Bach	St. Matthew Passion and St. John Passion (Evangelist and Arien), Mass in B minor, Christmas Oratorio, Magnificat and Sacred and Secular Cantatas
Carl P. E. Bach	Magnificat
Johann Bach	Wie fein und lieblich Cantata
Johann C. Bach	Magnificat
Johann L. Bach	Die mit Tränen säen
Beethoven	Missa Solemnis, Symphony No. 9, Mass in C major, Ne giorni miei felice, Christ on the Mount of Olives and Friedens Cantata
Hans G. Bertram	The Rich Man and Poor Lazarus
Bizet	Te Deum
Brahms	Rinaldo
Britten	Serenade and Les lluminations
Bruckner	Te Deum and Mass No. 3
Buxtehude	Magnificat
Cornelius	Stabat Mater and Großer Dominus
Dvorak	Requiem, Stabat Mater and Mass in D major
Gabrieli	In Ecclesiis
Gounod	Missa Solemnis
Händel	Messiah, Judas Maccabeus, Israel in Egypt, Preis der Tonkunst, Ode for St. Cecilia's Day and Alexander's Feast
Haydn	The Creation, The Seasons, Stabat Mater, Salve Regina and Masses
Honegger	King David
Janáček	Glagolitic Mass and Pater Noster
Kodaly	Psalmus Hungaricus and Missa Brevis
Lisz	Christus and Psalms 23, 110
F. Martin	Golgatha and La Nativité du Jesu Christ
José Mauricio	Credo and Te Deum
Mendelssohn	Elias, Paulus, The First Walpurgis Night and Symphony No. 2 (Lobgesang)
Monteverdi	Marian Vespers, Dixit Secondo and Canti Guenerie Amore
Mozart	Requiem, Vesperae de Dominica, Vesperae solennes de confessore, Freimaurer Cantata, Davidde penitente, Concert Arias, Regina Coeli and Masses
L. Nono	Sul ponte di Hiroshima
Orff	Carmina Burana and Catulli Carmina
Penderecki	Dies irae
Puccini	Messa di Gloria
Reger	Requiem-Satz and O Sacred Head, Now Wounded
Rossini	Stabat Mater and Petite Messe Solennelle
Saint-Saens	Christmas Oratorio
Santoro	Verborgenheit and Cantata
D. Scarlatti	Missa di S. Cecilia and Große Messe in D
Schubert	Stabat Mater, Lazarus and Masses
Schütz	Christmas Story, Resurrection History, Musikalische Exequien, Magnificat, Vater Abraham - erbarme dich mein, Symphoniae Sacrae Nr. 7, 8, 9, 10 and Psalms Nr. 23, 130, 136
Schumann	Faust-Szenen, Requiem, Der Königssohn and Paradise and the Peri
Strawinsky	Les Noces, Cantata, Pulcinella and Wind Mass in B minor
Telemann	Der Tag des Gerichts, Jauchzet - ihr Christen, Süße Hoffnung - wenn ich frage and Psalms
K. Thomas	Messe in a
Verdi	Requiem
Vivaldi	Magnificat

== Opera Repertoire ==
Composer	Opera	Role
Auber	Fra Diavolo	Lorenzo
Beethoven	Fidelio	Jaquino
Bellini	La Somnambula (The Sleepwalker)	Elvino
Bizet	Les pêcheurs de perles (The Pearl Fishers)	Nadir
Cherubini	Anacréon; Lodoïska	Anacréon; Floreski
Donizetti	L'elisir d'amore Don Pasquale	Nemorino; Ernesto
Egk	Der Revisor	Bobtschinskij
de Falla	La Vida Breve (The Brief Life)	Paco
Fortner	Bluthochzeit	Der Mond
Gounod	Faust; Mireille	Faust; Vincent
Haydn	Philemon und Baucis; L'Infedeltà Delusa (Deceit Outwitted)	Philemon; Filippo
Hindemith	Cardillac	Cavalier
Lortzing	Zar und Zimmermann (Tsar and Carpenter)	Chateauneuf (French Ambassador)
Massenet	Manon; Werther	Des Grieux; Werther
Mozart	The Magic Flute; The Abduction from the Seraglio; Così fan tutte (Women are like that); Don Giovanni; Idomeneo The Marriage of Figaro; The Clemency of Titus; La Finta Giardiniera (The Pretend Garden-Girl)	Tamino; Belmonte; Ferrando; Don Ottavio; Idamantes; Arbace; Basilio; Tito; Count Belfiore
Nicolai	The Merry Wives of Windsor	Fenton
Puccini	Gianni Schicchi	Rinuccio
Ravel	The Child and the Spells	The Tree Frog; Wedgwood Teapot; The Little Old Man
Rossini	The Barber of Seville; The Italian Girl in Algiers; Cinderella	Count Almaviva; Lindoro; Don Ramiro
J. Strauss	The Flittermouse	Alfred
R. Strauss	The Knight of the Rose; Arabella	Italian Singer; Count Elemer
Strawinsky	Oedipus Rex	Oedipus; Shepherd
Verdi	La Traviata; Otello; Falstaff	Alfredo; Cassio; Fenton
Wagner	The Master-Singers of Nuremberg; Tannhäuser; Tristan and Isolde The Rhinegold Parsifal	David; Walther von der Vogelweide; Young Sailor; Shepherd; God of Spring; Sunshine; 3rd Squire
Zeller	The Bird Seller	Count Stanislaus

== Lied Repertoire ==
Composer	Lied
Beethoven	Scottish Songs with Piano Trio; An die ferne Geliebte; Gellert Lieder
Brahms	Liebeslieder Walzer
Debussy	Fêtes Galantes
Falla	Siete Canciones Populares Españolas
Fauré	Poème d'un Jour
Poulenc	Trois Chansons de F. García Lorca
Schubert	Die schöne Müllerin; Winterreise
Schumann	Dichterliebe; Liederkreis, Op. 39
Turina	Poema en Forma de Canciones

== Teaching career ==
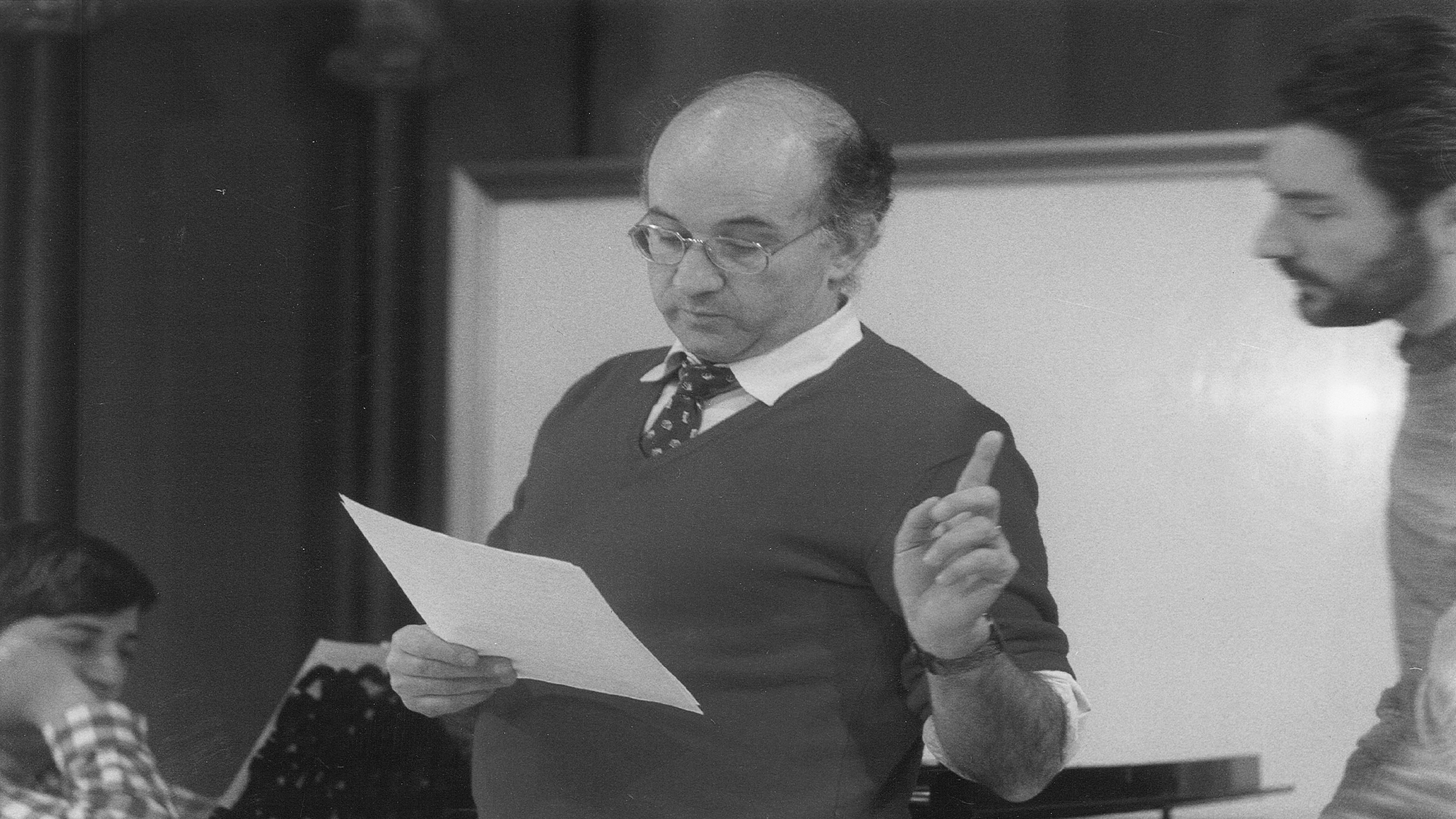
Baldin teaching at the Bach Academy of Buenos Aires (1993)

Among other institutions, Baldin taught at the music academies of Blumenau, Brazil, in 1975. From 1978 to 1980, he was a lecturer in vocal music at the Musikhochschule of Heidelberg and, in 1983, he became a professor at the Hochschule für Musik Karlsruhe. His students included Reginaldo Pinheiro, Fernando Portari, Roberto Saccà, Marc Marshall, Hernán Iturralde, Ulf Bästlein, Hans Christoph Begemann, Georg Heckel, Winfried Toll and Ralf Willershäuser.

Aldo Baldin died in Waldbronn, on January 5, 1994, at age 49.

== Documentary ==
In 2011, after receiving the Research and Development of Feature Film award from the Cinemateca Catarinense, filmmaker Yves Goulart started a research on Aldo Baldin's life and career to make his biographical documentary called Aldo Baldin - A Life for Music. The film was released in Brazil in July 2025 by Bretz Filmes.

== Discography ==
Baldin's discography covers a wide range of recordings of oratorios, Lieder and operas on well-known labels. He used to work regularly with the world's noted conductors and orchestras and performed at international music festivals, as well as in nearly all great concert halls and opera houses in the world. His recordings of complete operas include:

- Basilio in Le nozze di Figaro – José van Dam, Barbara Hendricks, Ruggero Raimondi, Lucia Popp, Agnes Baltsa, Robert Lloyd, Felicity Palmer – The Ambrosian Opera Chorus, Academy of St Martin in the Fields, Sir Neville Marriner (Philips Classics, 1986)
- Christ in Die Schuldigkeit des ersten Gebots – Margaret Marshall, Ann Murray, Inga Nielsen, Hans Peter Blochwitz – Radio-Sinfonieorchester Stuttgart, Sir Neville Marriner (Philips Classics, 1989)
- Filippo in L'infedeltà delusa – Edith Mathis, Barbara Hendricks, Claes H. Ahnsjö, Michael Devlin – Orchestre de Chambre de Lausanne, Antal Doráti (Philips Records, 1980)
- Hirte in Oedipus Rex – Gabriele Schreckenbach, Werner Hollweg, Roland Hermann, Roland Bracht, Jochen Bartels – Sinfonieorchester des Südwestfunks, Ferdinand Leitner (Intercord, 1989)
- Tenor soloist in L'incontro improvviso – Claes H. Ahnsjö, Linda Zoghby, Margaret Marshall, Della Jones, Domenico Trimarchi, Benjamin Luxon – Orchestre de Chambre de Lausanne, Antal Doráti (Philips Records, 1979; only featured in the appendix numbers)
- Monostatos in Die Zauberflöte – Samuel Ramey, Cheryl Studer, Kiri Te Kanawa, Francisco Araiza, Olaf Bär, Eva Lind, José van Dam, Yvonne Kenny, Iris Vermillion, Anne Collins – The Ambrosian Opera Chorus, Academy of St Martin in the Fields, Sir Neville Marriner (Philips Classics, 1989)

His oratorio and cantata work include:

- A majority of Johann Sebastian Bach's sacred cantatas, as well as his St. John Passion, under Helmuth Rilling for Hänssler and CBS.
- A 1980 recording of Joseph Haydn's The Creation under the direction of Sir Neville Marriner, with fellow soloists Edith Mathis and Dietrich Fischer-Dieskau, which garnered a Grammy Award at the 1981 ceremony.
- A recording of Gaetano Donizetti's rarely-performed Messa di Requiem under Miguel Angel Gomez-Martinez for Orfeo.
