= Jucemar (footballer, born 1980) =

Brazilian footballer

Personal information
- Full name: Jucemar Luiz Domingos de Ambrózio
- Date of birth: July 29, 1980 (age 46)
- Place of birth: Criciúma, Brazil
- Date of death: August 21, 2024
- Height: 1.76 m (5 ft 9 in)
- Position: Right back

Youth career
- 2000–2002: Criciúma

Senior career*
Years	Team	Apps	(Gls)
1999–2003	Criciúma		(0)
2003	Taubaté (loan)		
2003	Bahia		
2004–2005	Coritiba	32	(2)
2006–2007	FC Dinamo Tbilisi		
2007	Grêmio	4	(0)
2007	FC Dinamo Tbilisi		
2012	Icasa		
- * Club domestic league appearances and goals

Jucemar Luiz Domingos de Ambrózio (born 29 July 1980 in Criciúma - SC / died 21 August 2024 in Siderópolis, SC), or simply Jucemar, was a Brazilian right back who played for FC Dinamo Tbilisi.

Jucemar previously played for Criciúma Esporte Clube, Coritiba Foot Ball Club and Grêmio Foot-Ball Porto Alegrense. Jucemar appeared in 45 competitive matches for Criciúma. He last played for CSA at age 31.

== Honours ==
- Rio Grande do Sul State League: 2007
