= Arroio Trinta =

- Municipality
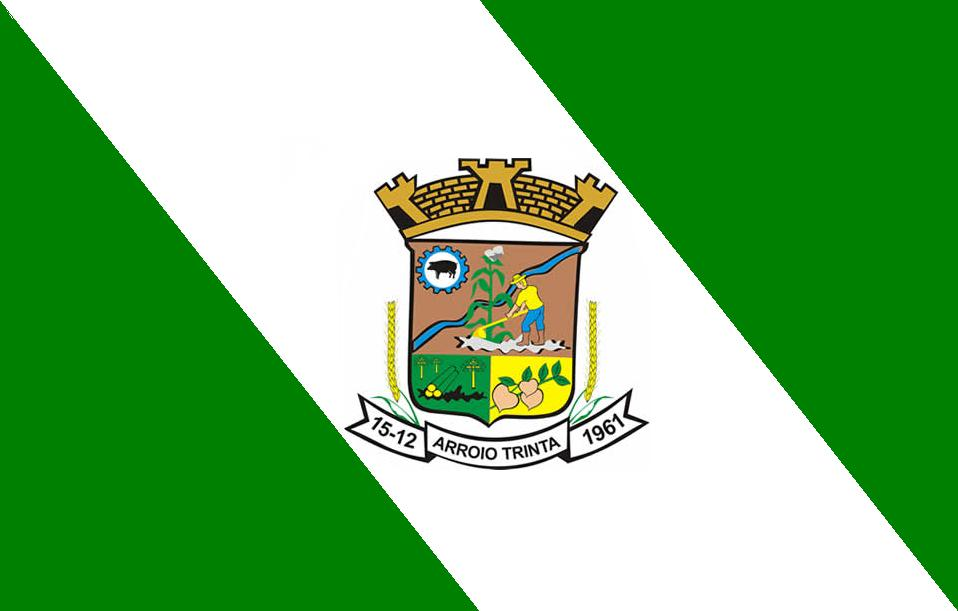
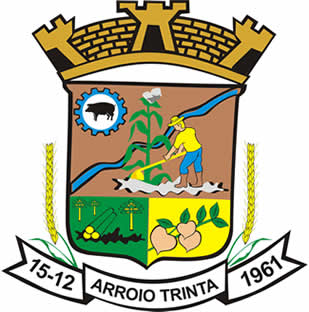
- Flag Coat of arms

- Location in Brazil
- Coordinates: 26°52′S 51°19′W
- Country: Brazil
- Region: South
- State: Santa Catarina
- Mesoregion: Oeste Catarinense

Population (2020)
  - Total: 3,549
- Time zone: UTC -3

Arroio Trinta is a municipality in the state of Santa Catarina in the South region of Brazil. The population in 2020 was 3,549 inhabitants.

== History ==
=== Etymology ===
There is a degree of curiosity concerning the name of the town. It is said that in order to arrive at the city of Videira (to which the town belonged until 1961), a small river (Arroio) had to be crossed thirty (Trinta) times, and for this reason the name of the town became Arroio Trinta.

=== Origin ===
The Italian descendants who immigrated to the region of Urussanga began to colonise Arroio Trinta in 1924. Until then, the population was made up of caboclos.

The first mill of Arroio Trinta came a year later after the arrival of the first families and the first sawmill was established five years later.

== See also ==
- List of municipalities in Santa Catarina
- Official Arroio Trinta Website
