= Daniel Frasson =

Brazilian footballer and coach (1966–2023)

Personal information
- Date of birth: 10 December 1966
- Place of birth: Siderópolis, Brazil
- Date of death: 15 July 2023 (aged 56)
- Height: 1.78 m (5 ft 10 in)
- Position: Midfielder

Senior career*
Years	Team	Apps	(Gls)
- Palmeiras
- Internacional
- Atlético Mineiro
- Paraná
- Fortaleza

Managerial career
- 2006: Fortaleza
- Quixadá
- Iguatu
- Nova Russas
- Flamengo do Piauí
- Tiradentes
- Gurupi
- * Club domestic league appearances and goals

Daniel Frasson (10 December 1966 – 15 July 2023) was a Brazilian football player and coach.

== Career ==
Born in Siderópolis, Frasson played as a midfielder for Palmeiras, Internacional, Atlético Mineiro, Paraná and Fortaleza. With Palmeiras he won the national championship in 1993, the club's first title for 16 years. He also won a number of state titles, being the Campeonato Paulista in 1993, Campeonato Mineiro in 1995, Campeonato Catarinense in 1999, and Campeonato Cearense in 2000 and 2001.

After retiring as a player he became a technical director at Fortaleza, and also managed clubs including Quixadá, Iguatu, Nova Russas, Flamengo do Piauí, Tiradentes and Gurupi. He had a spell as Fortaleza manager in 2006.

== Death ==
Frasson died on 15 July 2023, at the age of 56.
