= Airton Souza =

Brazilian footballer and coach

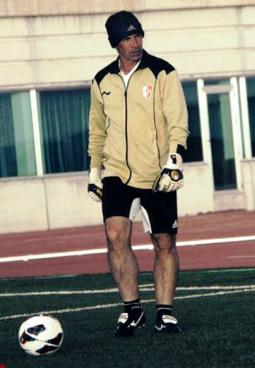
- Training Camp in Spain 2013

Personal information
- Full name: Airton de Souza
- Date of birth: 12 February 1958 (age 68)
- Place of birth: Criciuma,Brazil
- Position: Goalkeeper

Team information
- Current team: Al-Shamal Sports Club (Goalkeeper Coach)

Senior career*
Years	Team	Apps	(Gls)
1977–1978	Grêmio Foot-Ball Porto Alegrense		
1978–1982	Criciúma Esporte Clube (Comerciario)		
1983	Atletico Goianiense		
1984–1985	Hercílio Luz Futebol Clube		
1986–1987	Ferroviario Esporte Clube		
1988	Esporte Clube Uniao		
1989	Apucarana Futebol Clube		

Managerial career
- 1990–1997: Criciúma Esporte Clube (Brazil)
- 1997–2002: Shimizu Commercial High School (Japan)
- 2002–2005: Criciúma Esporte Clube (Brazil)
- 2006: Clube Náutico Capibaribe (Brazil)
- 2006–2008: Al-Khor Sports Club (Qatar)
- 2008–2016: Al-Shamal Sports Club (Qatar)
- 2016-2017: Al Rayyan SC GK Academy (Qatar)
- * Club domestic league appearances and goals

Airton de Souza, (commonly known simply as Souza), is a coach, goalkeeper and a former player for Comerciario (Criciúma Esporte Clube).
