= Siderópolis =

Siderópolis NOVA BELLUNO Bellun
- Municipality
- Flag Coat of arms
- Nickname: Sider
- Location in Brazil
- Coordinates: 28°35′S 49°26′W
- Country: Brazil
- Region: South
- State: Santa Catarina
- Mesoregion: Extreme Catarinense South

Area
  - Total: 101,400 sq mi (262,700 km^{2})
- Elevation: 482 ft (147 m)

Population (2020)
  - Total: 14,092
  - Density: 128/sq mi (49.6/km^{2})
- Time zone: UTC -3
- CEP: 88860000
- Area code: 48
- Website: http://www.sidera.com.br

Siderópolis is a municipality in the state of Santa Catarina in the South region of Brazil.

== History ==
Siderópolis (Nova Belluno) is one of the first Italian settlements in Brazil. The arrival of Italian immigrants in the region is related to the great migration of Europeans to various parts of the world that took place by the end of the 19th century. They migrated especially to the Americas, searching for better living options fleeing the squalid living conditions that came to be because of the European Industrial Revolution. In Brazil, after 1890, the federal government developed a policy aiming to encourage immigration from Europe, thus it reduced the price of ship tickets and gave them benefits, which favored the migration of Germans, Poles, Russians and Italians mainly to the region Southern Brazil.

In 1891, the first Italian immigrants who had embarked at Genoa in Italy arrived in Rio de Janeiro, passed by Desterro (Florianópolis's old name), Laguna with a train and the railway Dona Teresa Cristina they reached Pedras Grandes, from there on an ox cart to Urussanga, and finally to the long-awaited land yet unnamed. A beautiful land surrounded by a vast mountain range, plenty of natural resources and inhabited by Brazilian natives, the Bugres.

The immigrant group consisted of about 100 families from the Italian provinces of Belluno, Venice, Treviso, Ferrara and Bergamo. At first the settlement was known as Nova Belluno (New Belluno), which name was suggested by Marta Savaris, one of the immigrants, because of the similarity of the local relief of Belluno, Italy.

In the mid 20th century were discovered large reserves of coal in the soil of the region. The first miners began to settle it, among them Brazil's National Siderurgic Company (CSN), which explored the region between 1940 and 1980. The district was renamed itself Siderópolis to highlight the presence on the coal market, also to please the CSN's big investors, company which promised a bright future. In the 1940s, being a district Urussanga, from then began a movement for the emancipation of Siderópolis, which culminated on December 19, 1958, when then-governor of Santa Catarina, Heriberto Hülse, signed the law No. 380, breaking up the municipality of Siderópolis from Urussanga, thereby making the city politically emancipated and court of the county Urussanga.

== Language ==
The Italian presence was so strong that currently much of the population is bilingual, maintainers of Italian dialects, the most common being Bergamasco and a new fusion of the Veneto's dialect, named Talian. Even after nearly 150 years, a relevant percentage of the population speak Portuguese with strong Italian accent.

== Italian cuisine ==
A fusion of Northern Italian with German, Portuguese, Arabic and Polish cuisines developed in that area. The classic Polenta with chicken on tomato sauce, the Italian soup became Minestra di Fagioli (bean soup) as the production of all the kinds of beans is very common. It is quite easy to find a restaurant that serves lasagne with Churrasco (due to strong presence of gaucho tradition).

== Return to origins ==
As almost 80% of the people are of Italian ancestry, they have the right to dual nationality, eligible to living in the European Union. Every year hundreds of young couples migrate to Germany to work at Gelateria in the summer season, Bringing great growth in civil construction. Some of them decided to rebuild their lives in Italy, Germany and United kingdom. Some of the few descendants of Japanese who also settled in the region (see Japanese Brazilian) made their way to in Japan, as they found difficult to fit into cultural patterns of Brazilian society.

== Redemption of the traditions ==
Groups of culture and tradition are fighting today to change back the city's name for the original, New Belluno. The mining just brought destruction for the nature, polluting rivers and enriching a minority.

== Notable people ==
- Enemésio Ângelo Lazzaris, BISHOP of The Roman Catholic Diocese of Balsas (Latin: Dioecesis Balsensis) located in the city of Balsas in the ecclesiastical province of São Luís do Maranhão in Brazil.
- Valdo, football player
- Daniel Frasson, football player

== See also ==
- List of municipalities in Santa Catarina
- Santa Catarina (disambiguation)
