= Diomício Freitas Airport =

Diomício Freitas/Forquilhinha Airport Aeroporto Diomício Freitas/Forquilhinha
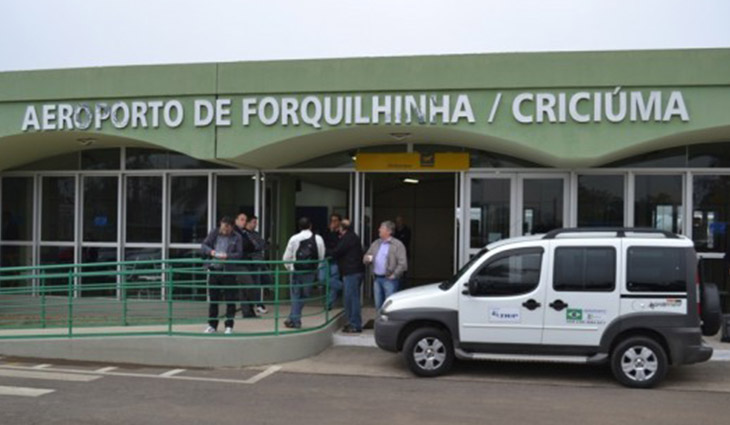
- IATA: CCM; ICAO: SSIM; LID: SC0009

Summary
- Airport type: Public
- Operator: Infraero (2006–2016); RDL Aeroportos (2017–2020); Infracea (2020–present)
- Serves: Criciúma
- Location: Forquilhinha, Brazil
- Opened: December 17, 1979
- Time zone: BRT (UTC−03:00)
- Elevation AMSL: 28 m (92 ft)
- Coordinates: 28°43′33″S 049°25′29″W

Map
- Location in Brazil

Runways
| Direction | Length | | Surface |
| Direction | m | ft | Surface |
|---|---|---|---|
| 09/27 | 1,568 | 5,144 | Asphalt |

Statistics (2016)
- Passengers: 59,865 ▼24%
- Aircraft Operations: 2,876 ▼13%
- Metric tonnes of cargo: 34 ▼11%
- Statistics: Infraero; Sources: ANAC, DECEA

Diomício Freitas/Forquilhinha Airport (IATA: CCM, ICAO: SSIM) formerly SBCM, is the airport serving Criciúma, Brazil, located in the adjoining municipality of Forquilhinha. It is named after Diomício Manoel de Freitas (1911-1981), a local entrepreneur and politician.

It is operated by Infracea.

== History ==
The airport was opened on December 17, 1979.

Between 2006 and 2016 the airport was managed by contract by Infraero, and between 2017 and 2020 by RDL Aeroportos. In 2020 Infracea became the new contractor.

== Airlines and destinations ==
| Airlines | Destinations |
|---|---|
| Azul Conecta | Florianópolis |

== Access ==
The airport is located 6 km (4 mi) from downtown Criciúma and 8 km (5 mi) from downtown Forquilhinha.

== See also ==
- List of airports in Brazil
