= Pedras Grandes =

Municipality in Santa Catarina, Brazil

Coordinates: 28°27′S 49°11′W

- Municipality
- Municipality of Pedras Grandes
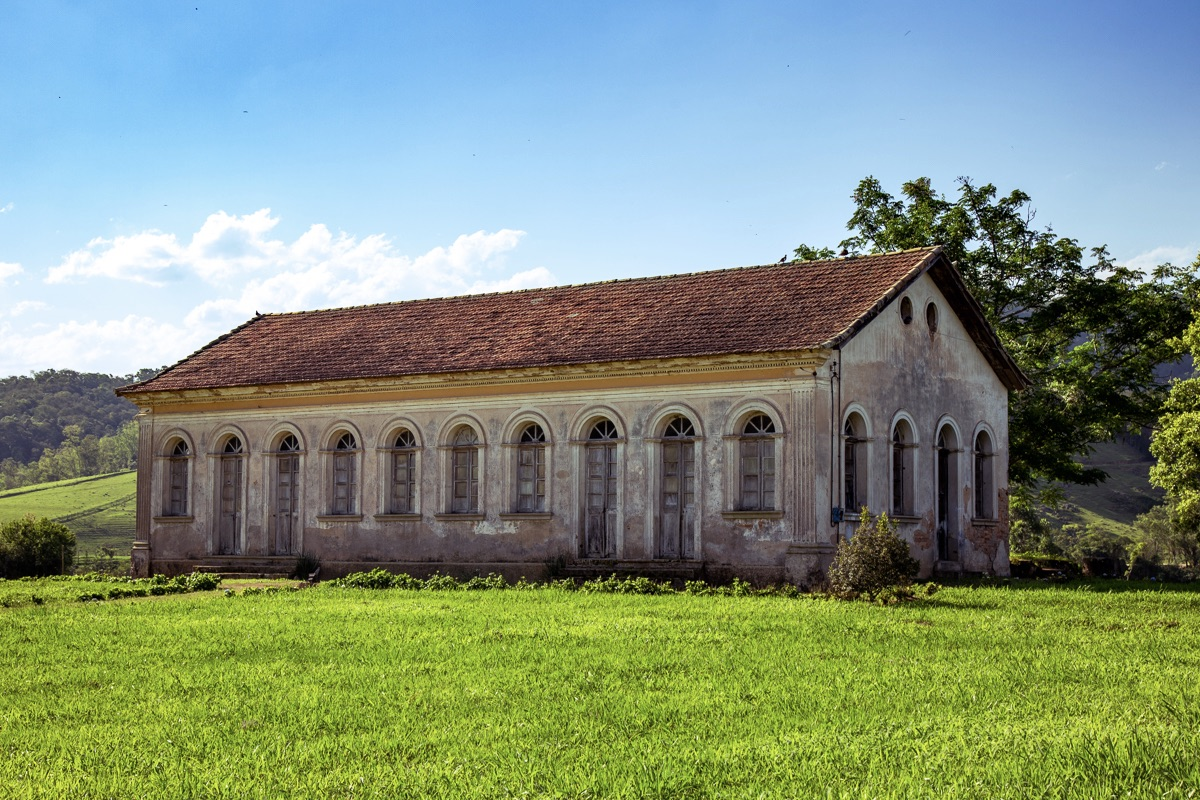

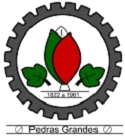
- Flag Coat of arms

- Country: Brazil
- Region: South
- State: Santa Catarina
- HDI (2010): 0.728 – high

Pedras Grandes is a municipality in Brazilian State of Santa Catarina.

== History ==
Pedras Grandes is a town of Italian immigration. In 1877, the first Italian immigrants arrived from Veneto. The town thrived on coal mining. The town was elevated to a municipality in 1961. Until then, it was a district of Tubarão. It is considered the "cradle" of Italian settlement in Southern Santa Catarina.

== Geography ==
Situated at 28º26'09" South and 49º11'06" West, upon River Tubarão. Its population, as of 2020, was estimated at 3,953 inhabitants, of whom 90% is estimated to be of Italian descent. The area of the municipality is 153,81 km^{2}.
