= 25 Scottish Songs =

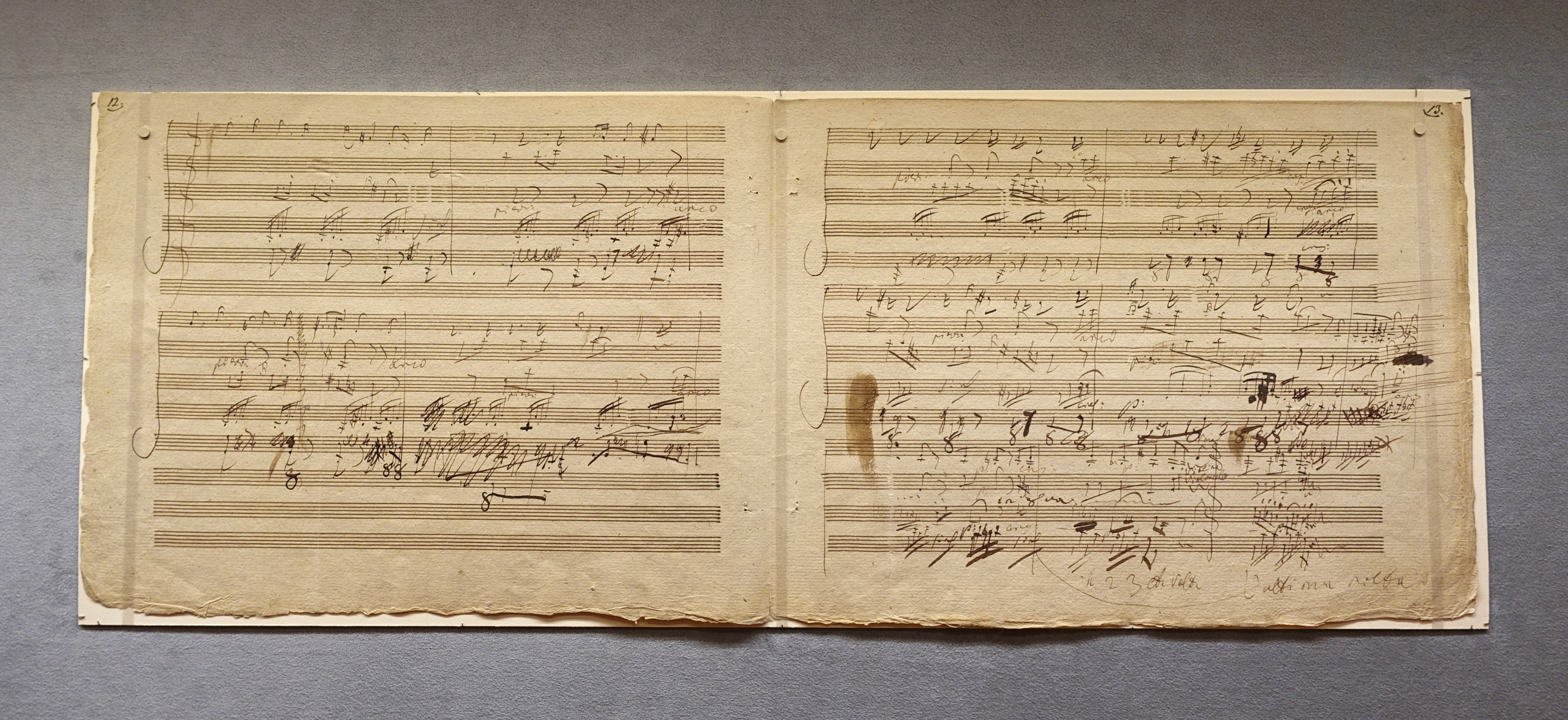
"The Sweetest Lad Was Jamie" in the Schottische Lieder, op. 108, no.5, 1814–1815, musical autograph

25 Scottish Songs (or in full Twenty-five Scottish songs: for voice, mixed chorus, violin, violoncello and piano) (Opus 108) is a classical musical arrangement written from 1814 onward by German composer and pianist Ludwig van Beethoven. The work was published in London and Edinburgh in 1818, and in Berlin in 1822.

The names of the songs are:

1. "Music, Love and Wine"; "O let me music hear, night and day!" 1817, words by William Smyth, folk song setting
2. "Sunset"; "The sun upon the Weirdlaw Hill;" 1818, words by Sir Walter Scott, folk song setting
3. "O sweet were the hours;" 1817, words by William Smyth, folk song setting
4. "The Maid of Isla"; "O maid of Isla from yon cliff;" 1817, words by Sir Walter Scott, folk song setting
5. "The sweetest lad was Jamie;" 1815, words by William Smyth, folk song setting
6. "Dim, dim is my eye;" 1815, words by William Brown, folk song setting
7. "Bonnie Laddie, Highland Laddie"; "Where got ye that siller moon" 1815, words by James Hogg, folk song setting
8. "The lovely lass of Inverness;" 1816, words by Robert Burns, folk song setting
9. "Behold, my Love"; "Behold my Love how green the groves;" 1817, words by Robert Burns, folk song setting
10. Sympathy; "Why, Julia, say, that pensive mien?" 1815, words by William Smyth, folk song setting
11. Oh, Thou Art the Lad of My Heart, Willy; 1815, words by William Smyth, folk song setting, variations on this air: Op 107 #9
12. Oh, Had My Fate Been Join'd With Thine; 1816, words by Lord Byron, folk song setting
13. Come Fill, Fill, My Good Fellow; 1817, words by William Smyth, folk song setting
14. O How Can I Be Blithe; 1816, words by Robert Burns, folk song setting
15. O Cruel was My Father; 1816, words by Alexander Ballantyne, folk song setting
16. Could This Ill World Have Been Contriv'd; 1816, words by James Hogg, folk song setting
17. O Mary at Thy Window Be, 1817; words by Robert Burns, folk song setting
18. Enchantress, Farewell; 1818, words by Sir Walter Scott, folk song setting
19. O Swiftly Glides the Bonny Boat; 1815, words by Joanna Baillie, folk song setting
20. Faithfu' Johnie; "When will you come again;" 1815, words by Anne Grant, folk song setting
21. Jeanie's Distress; "By William late offended;" 1817, words by William Smyth, folk song setting
22. The Highland Watch; "Old Scotia, wake thy mountain strain;" 1817, words by James Hogg, folk song setting for voice, chorus and piano trio
23. The Shepherd's Song; "The gowan glitters on the sward;" 1818, words by Joanna Baillie, folk song setting
24. Again, my Lyre, yet once again; 1815, words by William Smyth
25. Sally in Our Alley; "Of all the girls that are so smart;" 1817, words by Henry Carey, folk song setting

The names in German are:

1. Musik, Liebe und Wein: Es schallte die Musik, Nacht und Tag!
2. Der Abend: Die Sonne sinkt ins Ettrick-Thal
3. O köstliche Zeit: O köstliche Zeit
4. Das Islamädchen: O Islamägdlein, die du kühn
5. Der schönste Bub: Der schönste Bub war Henny
6. Trüb ist mein Auge: Trüb, trüb ist mein Auge wie
7. Frische Bursche, Hochlands Bursche: Wem den Silbermond ihr dankt
8. Die holde Maid von Inverness: Die holde Maid von Inverness kennt
9. Schau her, mein Lieb: Schau her, mein Lieb, der Wälder grün
10. Sympathie: Was, Julia sagt der Blick voll Gram
11. O du nur bist mein Herzensbub: O du nur bist mein Herzensbub
12. O hatte doch dies gold'ne Pfand: O hatte doch dies gold'ne Pfand
13. Trinklied: Schenk ein, mein guter Junge, schenk hoch
14. O, wie kann ich wohl fröhlich sein: O, wie kann ich wohl fröhlich sein?
15. O, grausam war mein Vater: O, grausam war mein Vater
16. Wenn doch die arge böse Welt: Wenn doch die arge böse Welt
17. Mariechen, komm ans Fensterlein: Mariechen komm ans Fensterlein
18. O Zaub'rin, leb'wohl: Leb'wohl, o Zaub'rin
19. Wie gleitet schnell das leichte Boot: Wie gleitet schnell das leichte Boot
20. Der treue Johnie: O wann kehrst du zurück
21. Jeanie's Trübsal: Als William jüngst mich schähte
22. Die Hochlands Wache: Alt Schottland, wecke deiner Hohn
23. Des Schäfers Lied: Die Masslieb glänzt auf grünem Grund
24. Noch einmal wecken Thränen: Noch einmal wecken Thränen bang
25. Das Baschen in unserm Strässchen: Von allen Mädchen glatt und schön
