= Der Tag des Gerichts =

Der Tag des Gerichts (TWV 6:8) is a sacred oratorio for chorus, orchestra and continuo by Georg Philipp Telemann. Composed in 1762, the work is Telemann's final oratorio. The title of the work refers to "Judgement Day" or "The Day of Reckoning."
