= Timbé do Sul =

Coordinates: 28.8303°S 49.8472°W

- Municipality
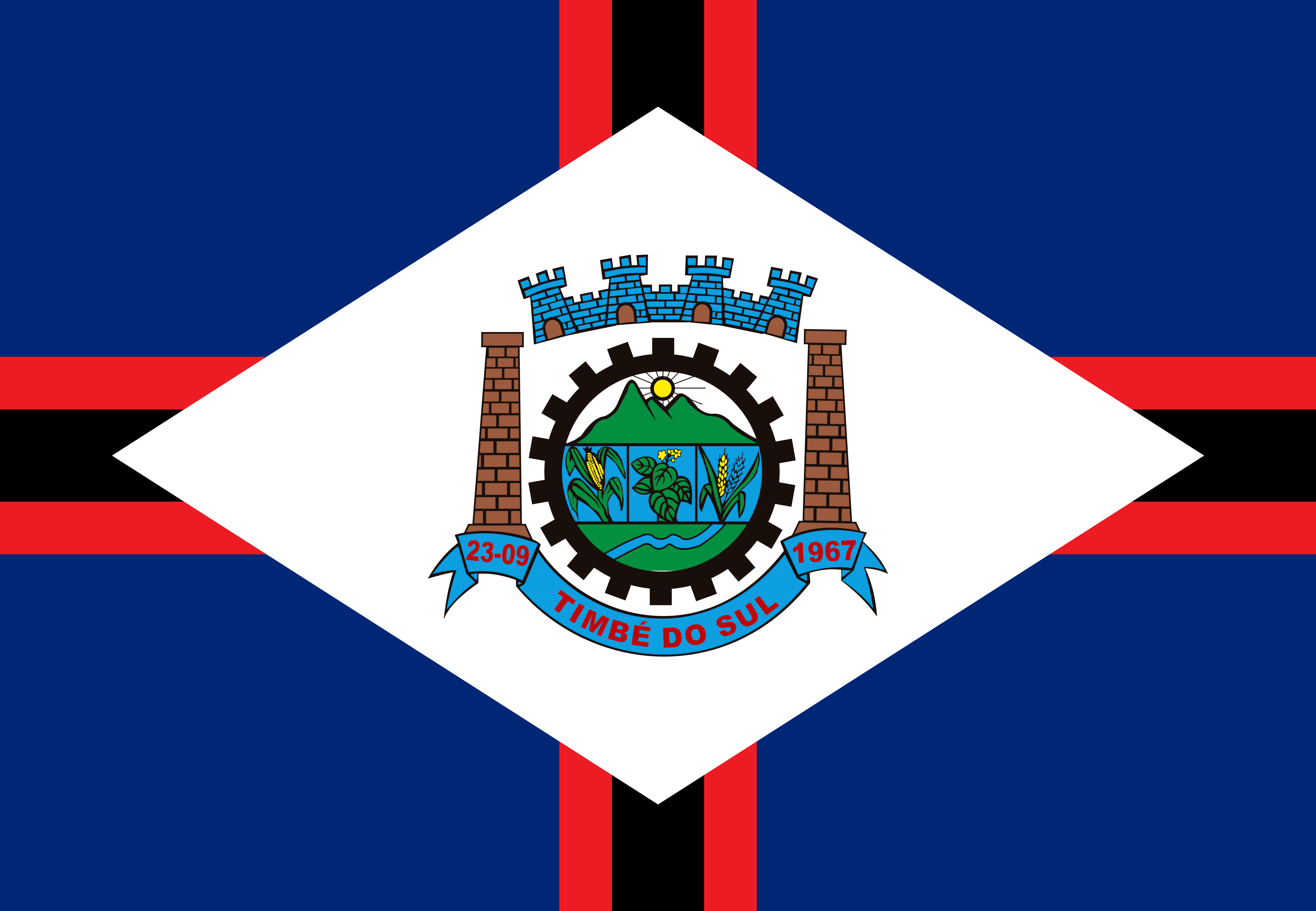
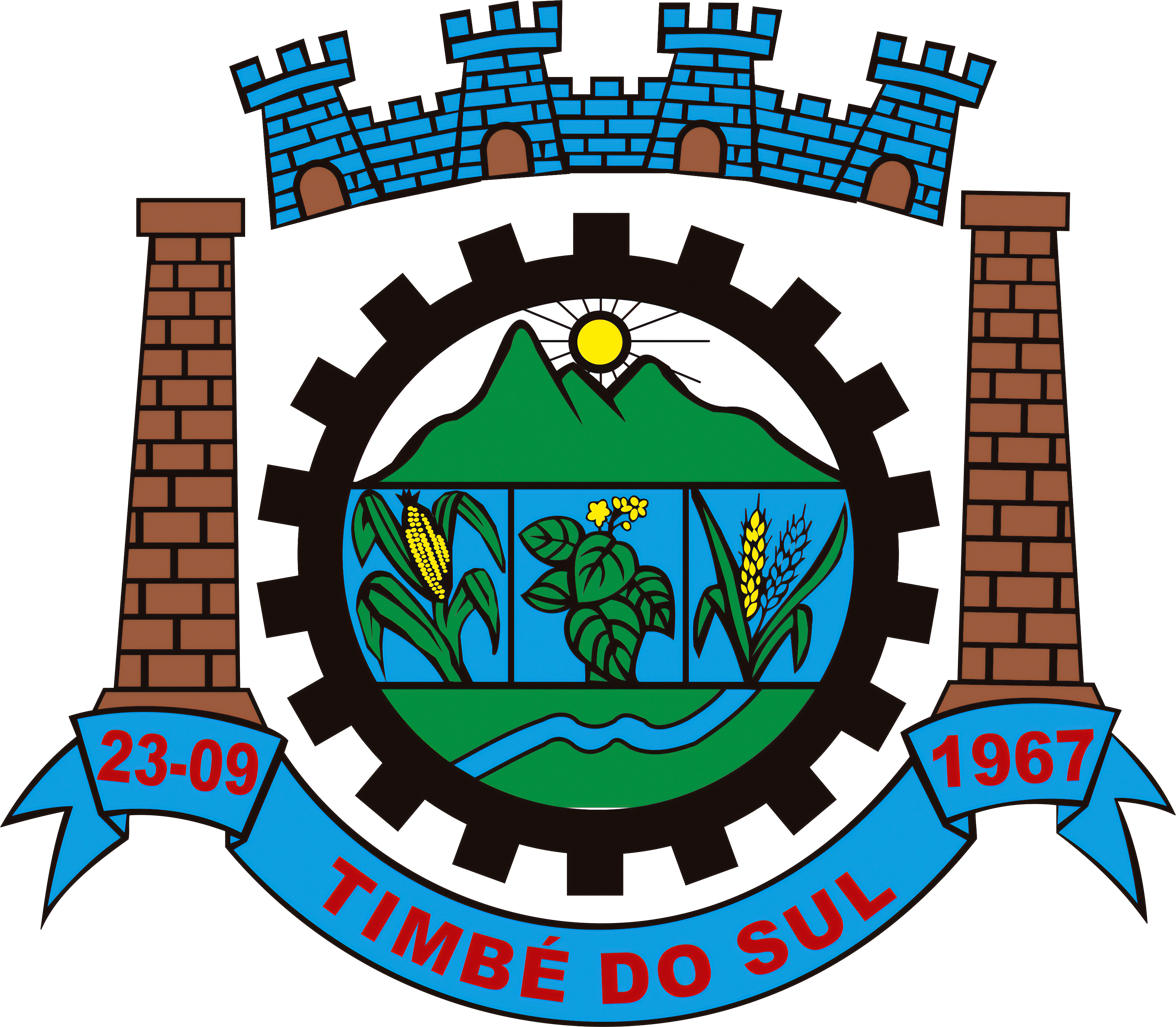
- Flag Coat of arms
- Interactive map of Timbé do Sul
- Country: Brazil
- Region: South
- State: Santa Catarina
- Mesoregion: Sul Catarinense

Population (2020)
  - Total: 5,343
- Time zone: UTC -3
- Website: www.timbedosul.sc.gov.br

Timbé do Sul is a municipality in the state of Santa Catarina in the South region of Brazil.

== See also ==
- List of municipalities in Santa Catarina
