= Forquilhinha =

Municipality in Santa Catarina, Brazil

Coordinates: 28°45′51″S 49°28′20″W

- Municipality
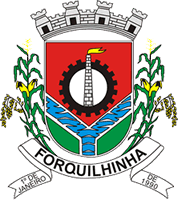
- Flag Coat of arms
- Interactive map of Forquilhinha
- Country: Brazil
- Time zone: UTC−3 (BRT)

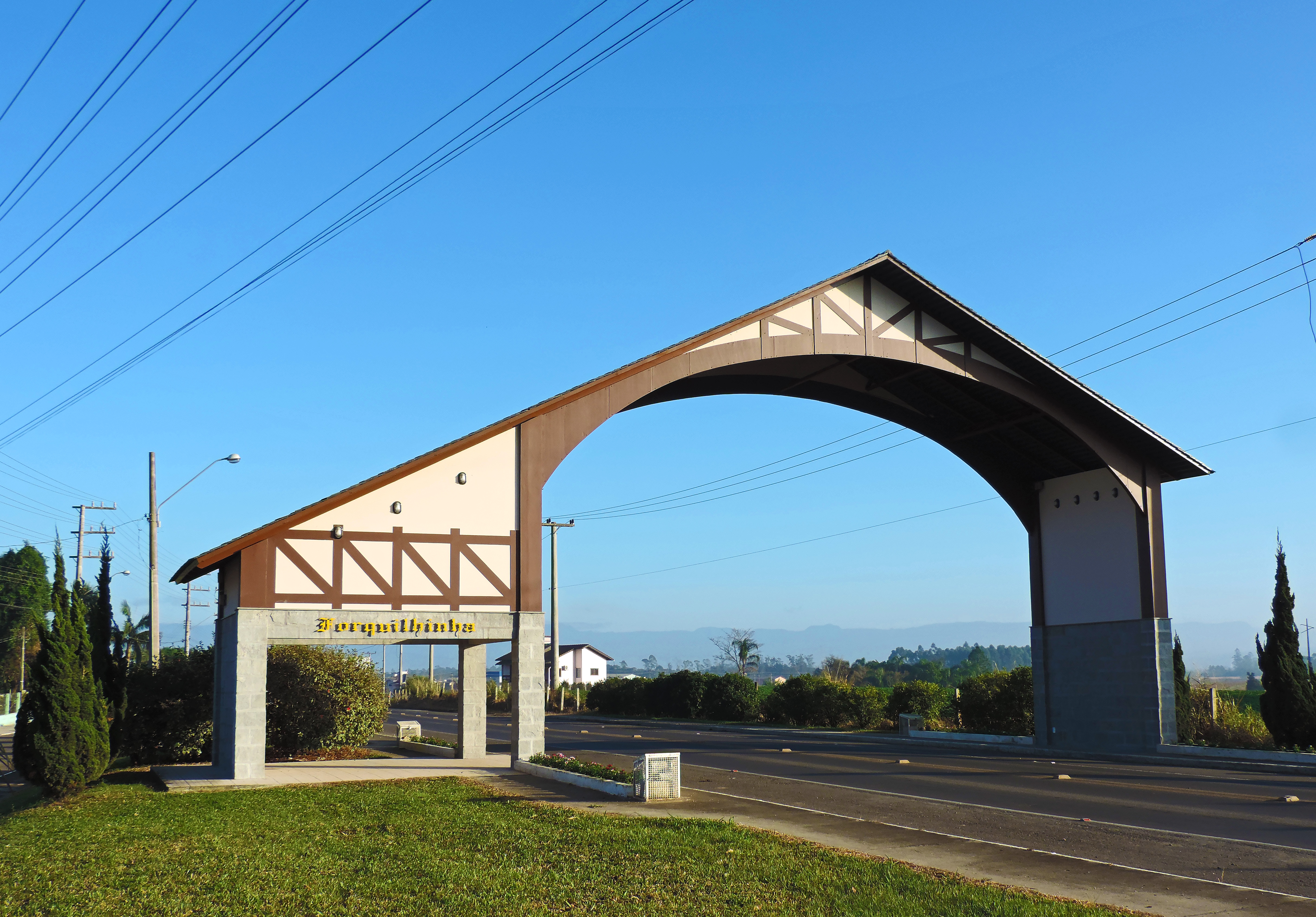
Major road of Forquilhinha

Forquilhinha is a municipality in the Brazilian state of Santa Catarina. In 2020, it had a population of 27,211 inhabitants. It covers an area of 184,557 km^{2} at an altitude of 42 meters above sea level. It is the native town of cardinal Paulo Evaristo Arns and his sister Zilda Arns.

The city is served by Diomício Freitas Airport.
