= Cocal do Sul =

- Municipality
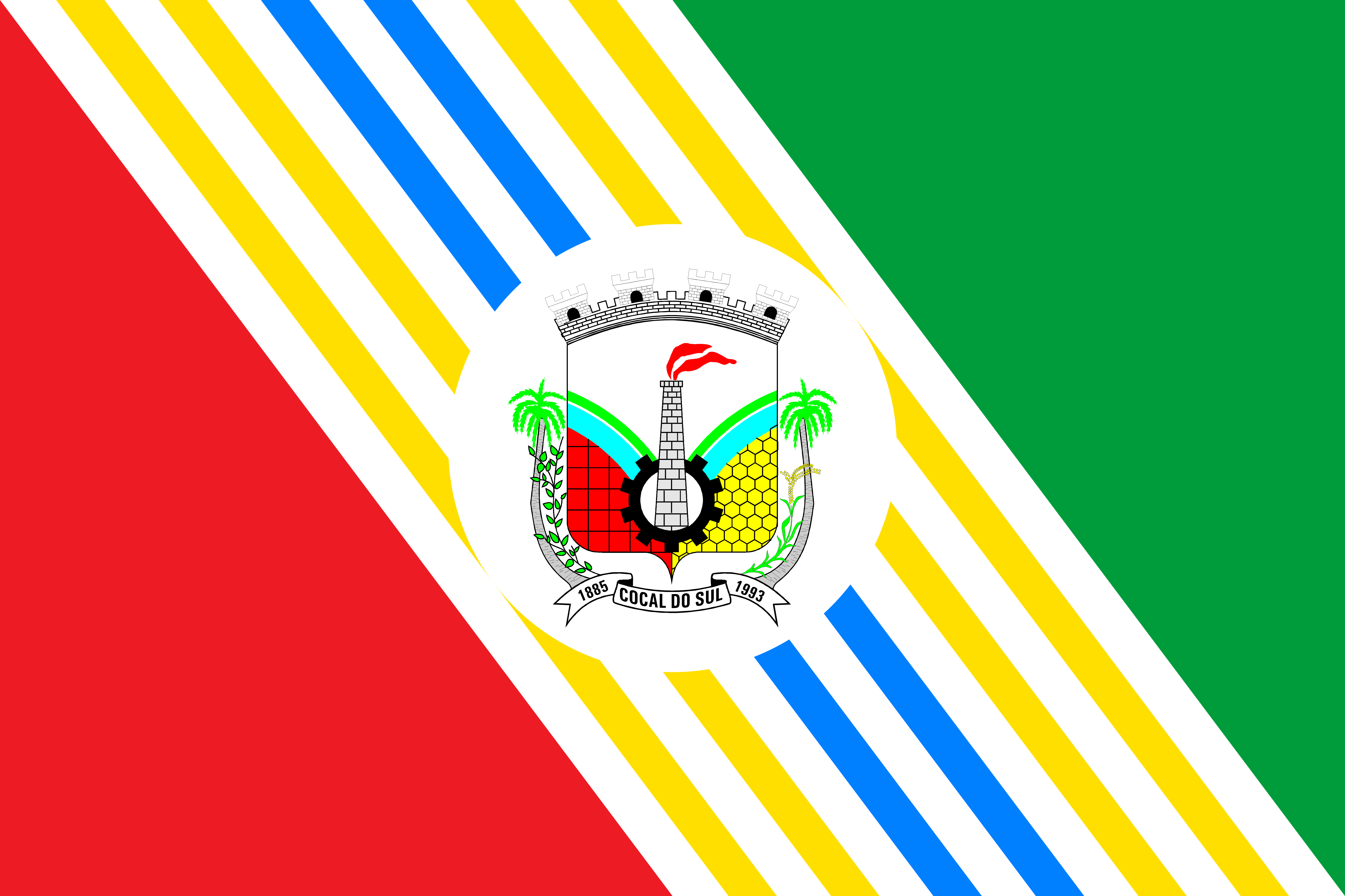
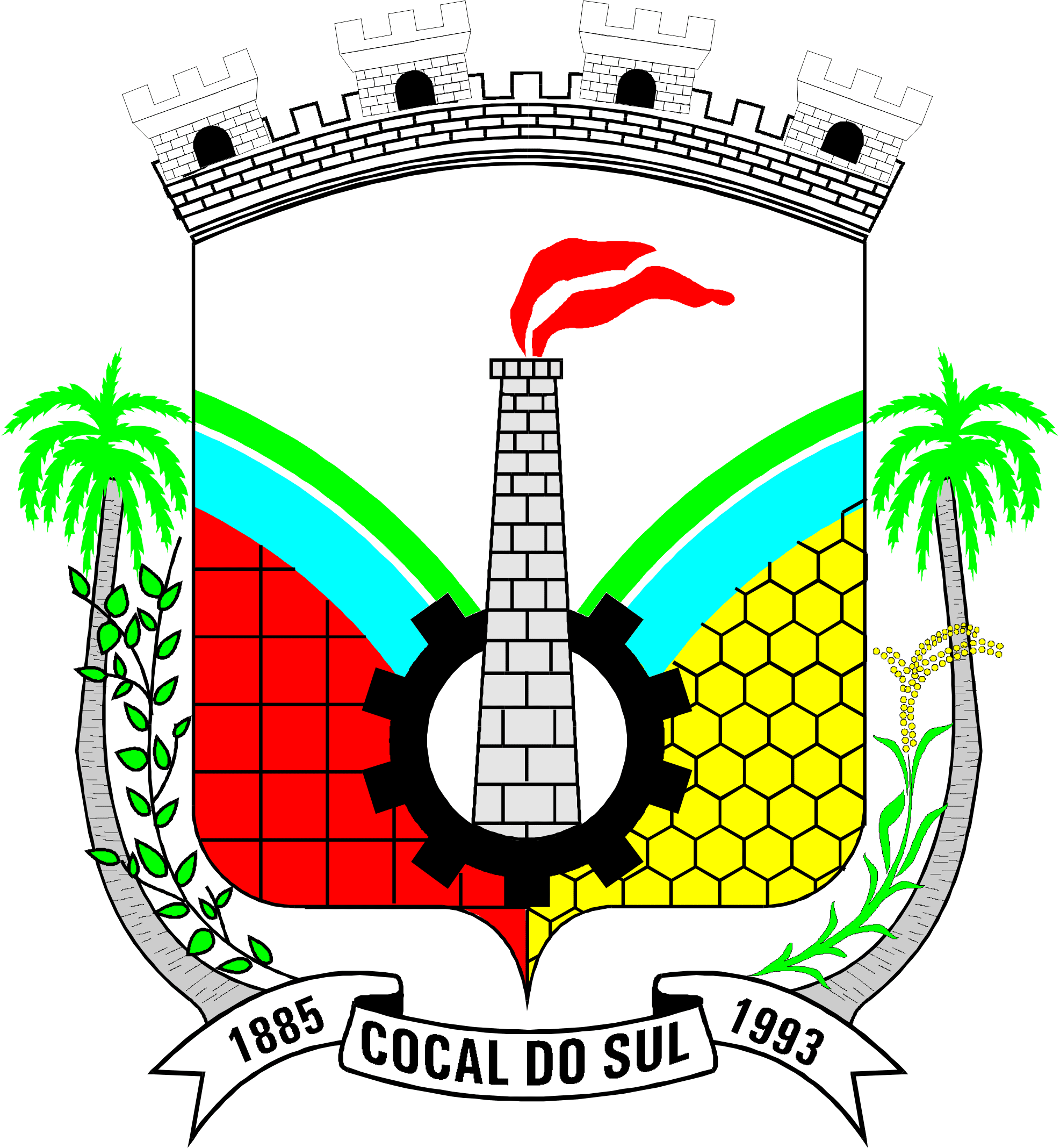
- Flag Coat of arms

- Location in Brazil
- Coordinates: 28.6008°S 49.3258°W
- Country: Brazil
- Region: South
- State: Santa Catarina
- Mesoregion: Sul Catarinense

Population (2020)
  - Total: 16,821
- Time zone: UTC -3
- Website: www.cocaldosul.sc.gov.br

Cocal do Sul is a municipality in the state of Santa Catarina in the South region of Brazil.

== See also ==
- List of municipalities in Santa Catarina
