= Morro da Fumaça =

Morro da Fumaça, Santa Catarina
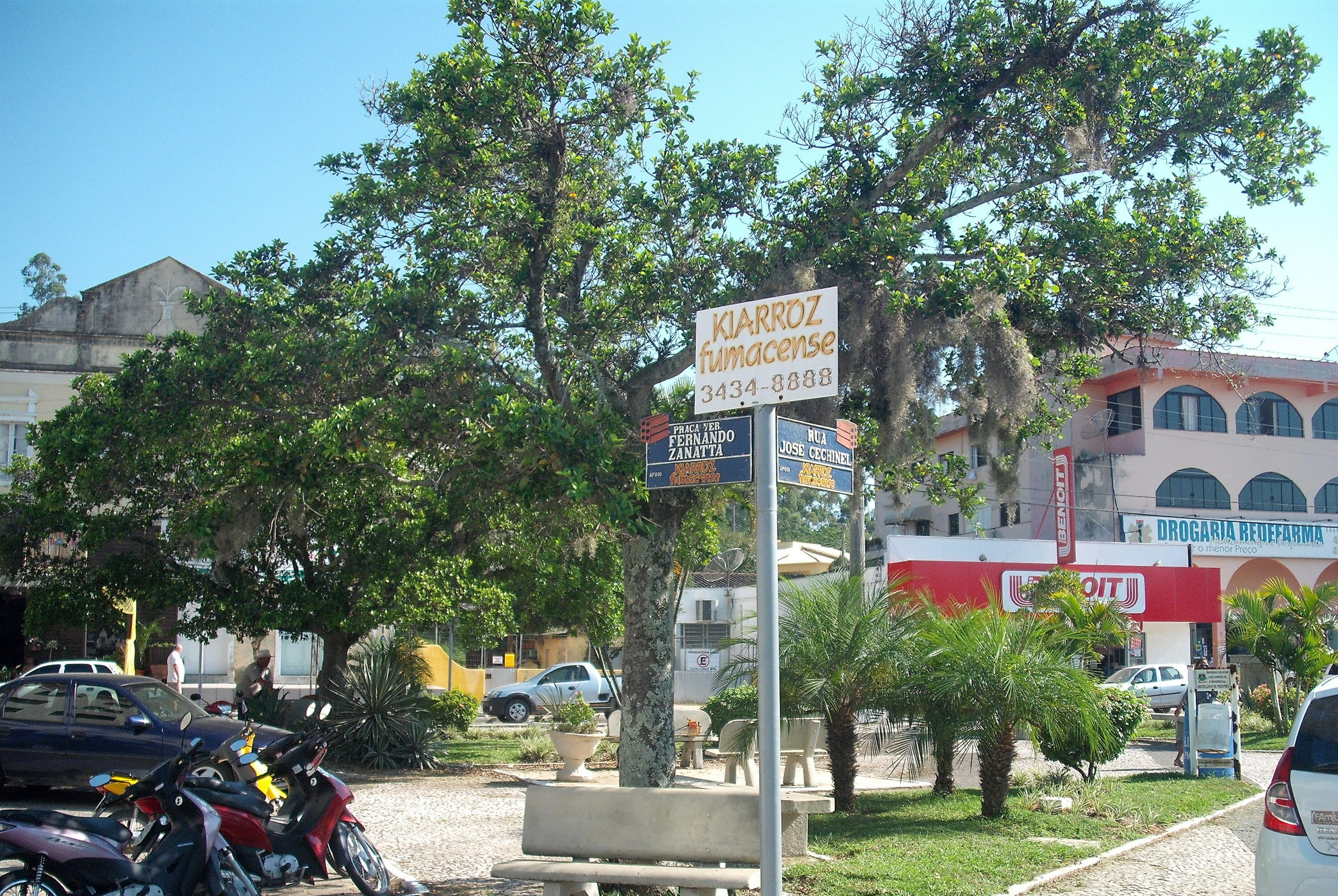

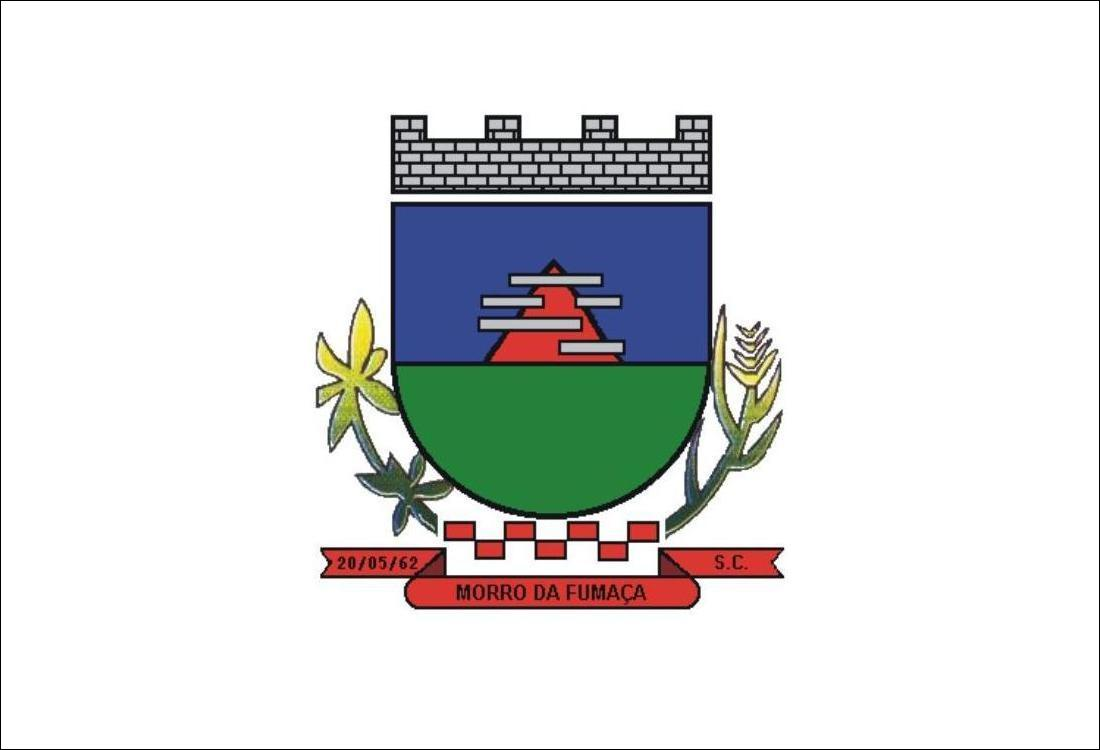
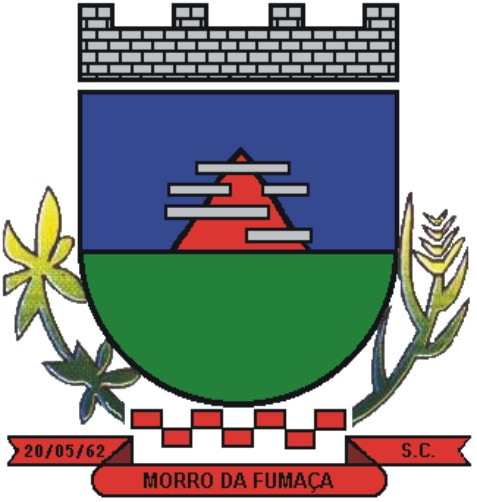
- Flag Coat of arms

- Location in Brazil

- Location within Brazil
- Coordinates: 28°28′00″S 49°00′25″W
- Country: Brazil
- Region: South
- State: Santa Catarina
- City Emancipation: May 20, 1962

Government
  - (Prefeito) (Vice-prefeito) (Presidente da camara): Eduardo guollo (PP) Davi pelegrin (PP) Marijane felippe (PP)

Area
  - City: 82.935 km^{2} (32.021 sq mi)
  - Urban: 34,846 km^{2} (13,454 sq mi)
  - Metro: 12,153 km^{2} (4,692 sq mi)
- Elevation: 18 m (59 ft)

Population (2025)
  - City: 20.000(estimado)
  - Density: 253/km^{2} (660/sq mi)
- Time zone: UTC-3 (UTC-3)
  - Summer (DST): UTC-2 (UTC-2)
- HDI (2020): 0.894 – very high
- Climate Type: Temperate
- Website: Prefeitura Municipal

Morro da Fumaça is a Brazilian municipality in the state of Santa Catarina. Its population was estimated at 20,000 inhabitants in 2025(2026). It has an area of 82.935 square kilometres (32.021 sq mi) and is located at an average elevation of 18 metres (59 ft).
