= Nova Veneza, Santa Catarina =

Brazilian municipality located in Santa Catarina, Southern Brazil

Coordinates: 28.6369°S 49.4978°W

- Municipality
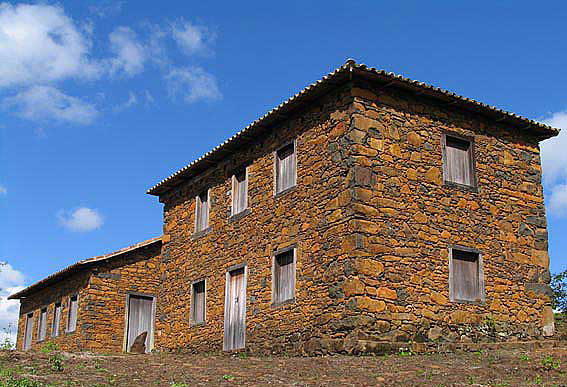
- Typical Northern Italian house made with rocks in Nova Veneza.

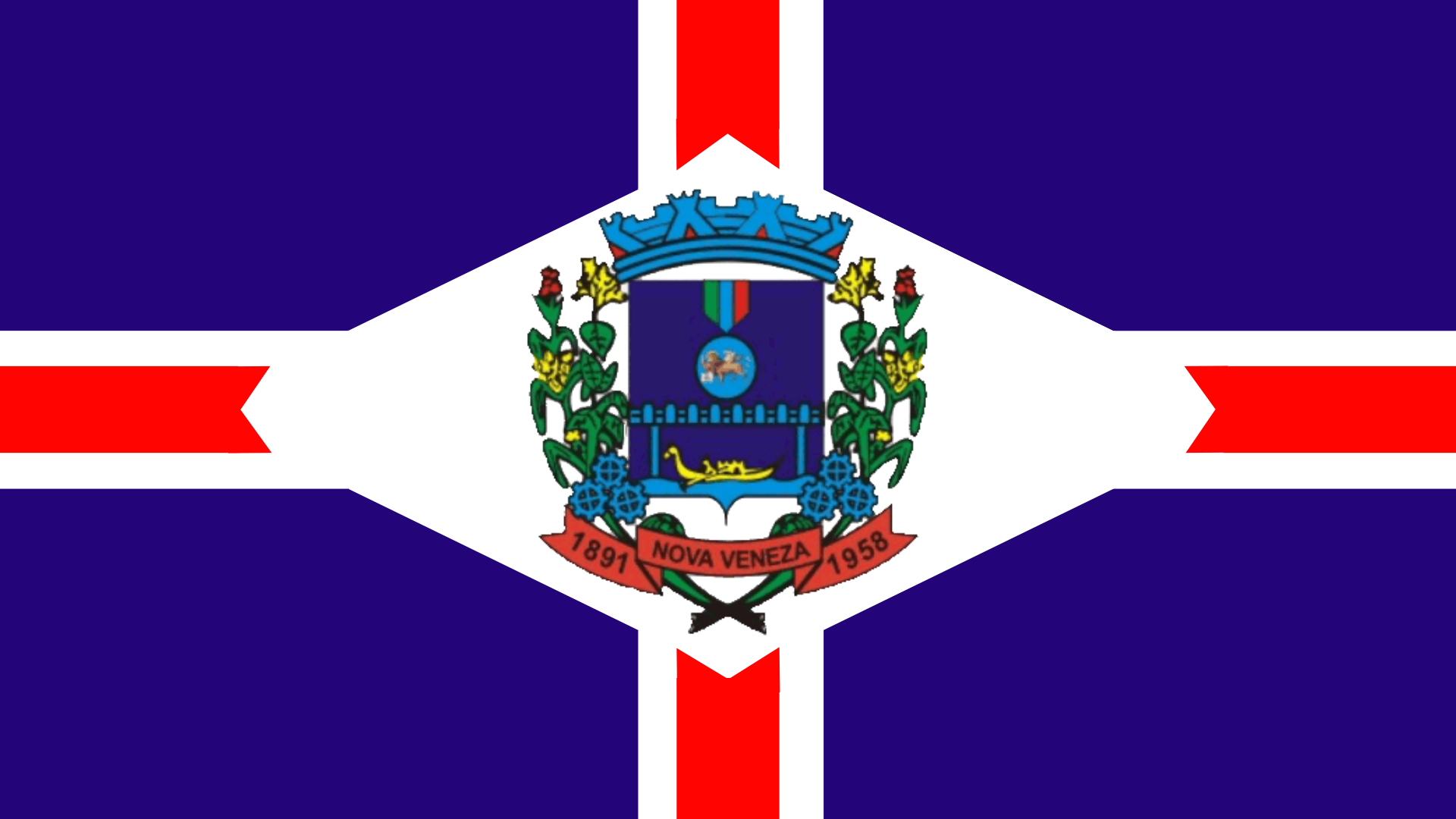
- Flag Coat of arms
- Interactive map of Nova Veneza, Santa Catarina
- Country: Brazil
- Time zone: UTC−3 (BRT)

Nova Veneza (a Portuguese name meaning "New Venice") is a Brazilian municipality located in Santa Catarina, Southern Brazil. It has 15,342 inhabitants and was settled by immigrants from Venice in 1891.

People of Venetian descent make up 95% of the population.
