= Maracajá =

Coordinates: 28.8467°S 49.4528°W

- Municipality
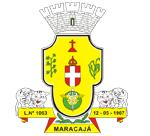
- Flag Coat of arms
- Interactive map of Maracajá
- Country: Brazil
- Region: South
- State: Santa Catarina
- Mesoregion: Sul Catarinense

Population (2020)
  - Total: 7,378
- Time zone: UTC -3

Maracajá is a municipality in the state of Santa Catarina in the South region of Brazil.

== See also ==
- List of municipalities in Santa Catarina
