= Urussanga =

Coordinates: 28.5178°S 49.3208°W

- Municipality
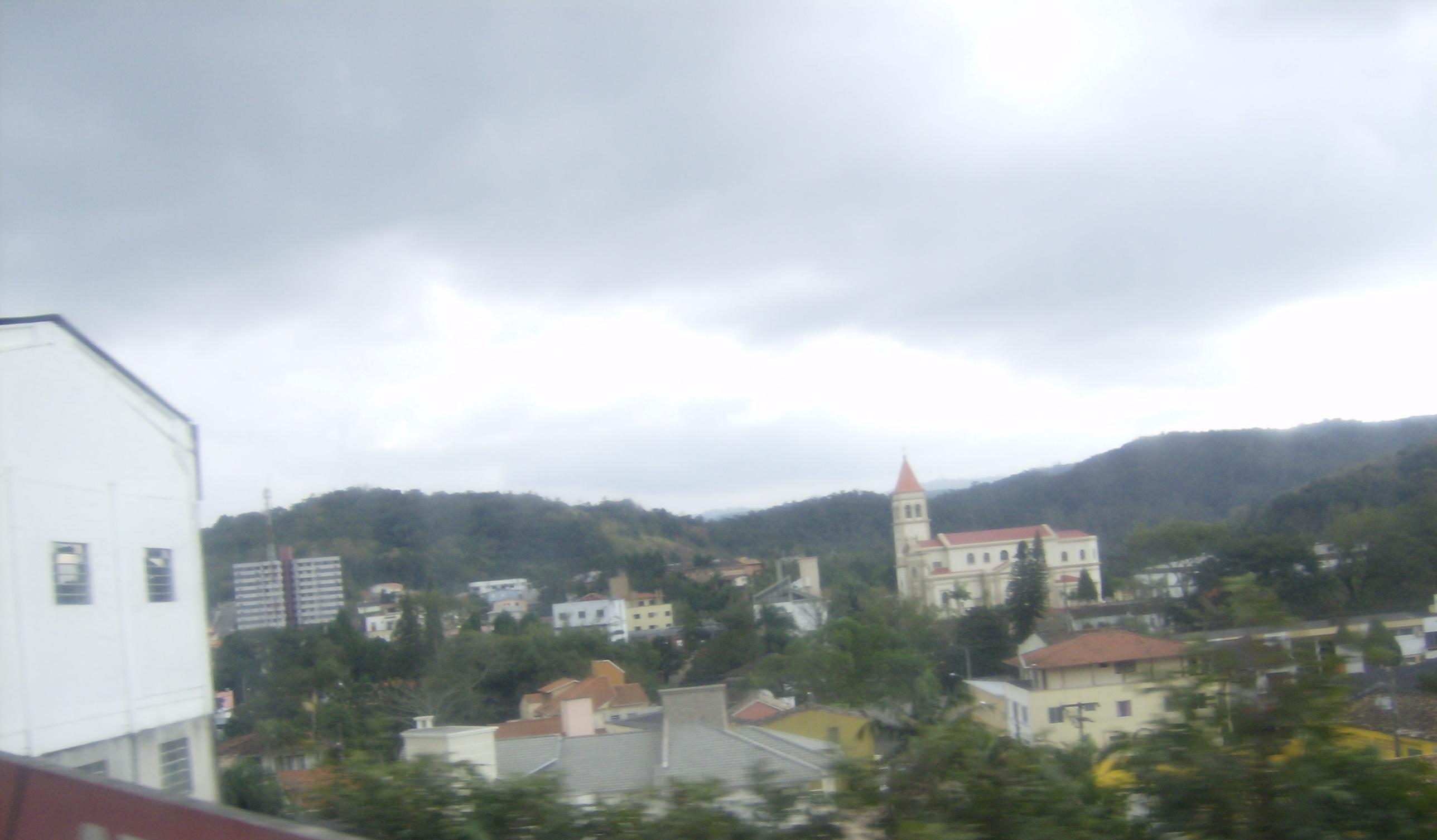

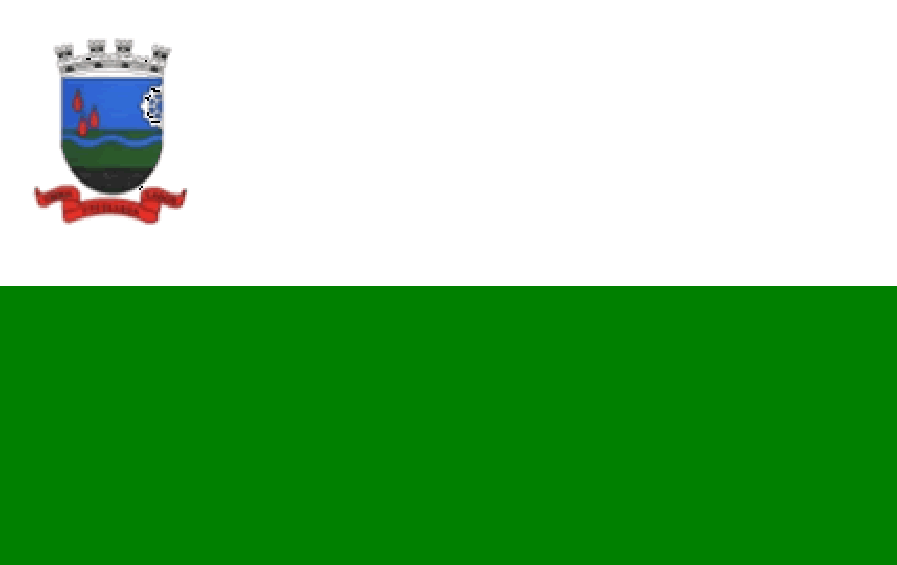
- Flag Coat of arms
- Interactive map of Urussanga
- Country: Brazil
- Region: South
- State: Santa Catarina
- Mesoregion: Sul Catarinense

Population (2020)
  - Total: 21,344
- Time zone: UTC -3

Urussanga is a municipality in the state of Santa Catarina in the South region of Brazil. The name means "very cold water" in the Tupi language.

Urussanga is a municipality in the state of Santa Catarina, Brazil. It is at latitude 28º31'04" south and longitude 49º19'15" west, being at an altitude of 49 meters, and 185 kilometers from the state capital Florianópolis. Its estimated population in 2020 was 21,344 inhabitants. It has an area of 237.41² kilometers.

Urussanga is also the name of the main river that cross the city. The village was founded by engineer Joaquim Vieira Ferreira on May 26, 1878 and emancipated on October 6, 1900. Main nucleus of Italian colonization in the south of the state, it stands out in gastronomy and wine production. It hosts the Wine Festival in even years, and Ritorno alle Origini in the odd ones: the first, always in August, and the second, on the city's anniversary, when the culture inherited from immigrants is celebrated, with much music, good food and good wine.

For a long time, the main economic activity was mineral coal extraction; the town is located in one of the main coal regions of the country (along with the municipalities of Lauro Müller, Siderópolis and Criciúma).

Most of current population's origin is Italian and the access roads to central area are SC-446 highway via Criciúma and Orleans and SC-445 via BR-101 (Morro da Fumaça).

The town is twinned with Longarone, in the province of Belluno, Veneto region, Italy.

== Climate ==
Climate data for Urussanga (1981–2010 normals, extremes 1976–2005)
Month	Jan	Feb	Mar	Apr	May	Jun	Jul	Aug	Sep	Oct	Nov	Dec	Year
Record high °C (°F)	42.2 (108.0)	40.7 (105.3)	39.2 (102.6)	37.0 (98.6)	36.6 (97.9)	33.6 (92.5)	34.4 (93.9)	38.2 (100.8)	39.3 (102.7)	40.5 (104.9)	41.0 (105.8)	41.7 (107.1)	42.2 (108.0)
Mean daily maximum °C (°F)	29.8 (85.6)	30.0 (86.0)	29.1 (84.4)	26.8 (80.2)	23.6 (74.5)	22.1 (71.8)	21.4 (70.5)	23.3 (73.9)	23.5 (74.3)	25.1 (77.2)	27.4 (81.3)	28.9 (84.0)	25.9 (78.6)
Daily mean °C (°F)	24.0 (75.2)	24.1 (75.4)	23.1 (73.6)	20.6 (69.1)	17.0 (62.6)	15.3 (59.5)	14.8 (58.6)	15.9 (60.6)	17.3 (63.1)	19.3 (66.7)	21.5 (70.7)	22.9 (73.2)	19.7 (67.5)
Mean daily minimum °C (°F)	19.3 (66.7)	19.5 (67.1)	18.5 (65.3)	15.8 (60.4)	12.2 (54.0)	10.6 (51.1)	10.1 (50.2)	10.6 (51.1)	12.1 (53.8)	14.3 (57.7)	16.3 (61.3)	18.0 (64.4)	14.8 (58.6)
Record low °C (°F)	9.6 (49.3)	7.2 (45.0)	6.0 (42.8)	−1.0 (30.2)	−1.8 (28.8)	−3.0 (26.6)	−6.0 (21.2)	−4.6 (23.7)	−1.6 (29.1)	1.2 (34.2)	3.2 (37.8)	5.6 (42.1)	−6.0 (21.2)
Average precipitation mm (inches)	191.8 (7.55)	179.3 (7.06)	188.9 (7.44)	108.8 (4.28)	157.6 (6.20)	66.7 (2.63)	120.6 (4.75)	110.0 (4.33)	122.4 (4.82)	129.5 (5.10)	150.5 (5.93)	157.7 (6.21)	1,683.8 (66.29)
Average precipitation days (≥ 1.0 mm)	12	14	12	9	9	7	9	7	10	11	11	11	122
Average relative humidity (%)	81.3	83.5	85.1	85.5	87.2	87.6	86.7	82.8	82.1	81.5	80.3	80.5	83.7
Mean monthly sunshine hours	163.3	150.5	165.4	154.8	147.7	122.0	133.3	147.5	133.5	151.1	162.1	166.3	1,797.5
Source 1: Instituto Nacional de Meteorologia
Source 2: Empresa Brasileira de Pesquisa Agropecuária (EMBRAPA)

== See also ==
- List of municipalities in Santa Catarina
