= 2021 Campeonato Catarinense =

Campeonato Catarinense
- Season: 2021
- Dates: 24 February - 26 May
- Champions: Avaí (18th title)
- Relegated: Criciúma; Metropolitano
- Copa do Brasil: Avaí; Chapecoense
- Série D: Juventus; Marcílio Dias; Próspera
- Matches: 80
- Goals: 178 (2.23 per match)
- Top goalscorer: Perotti (15 goals)

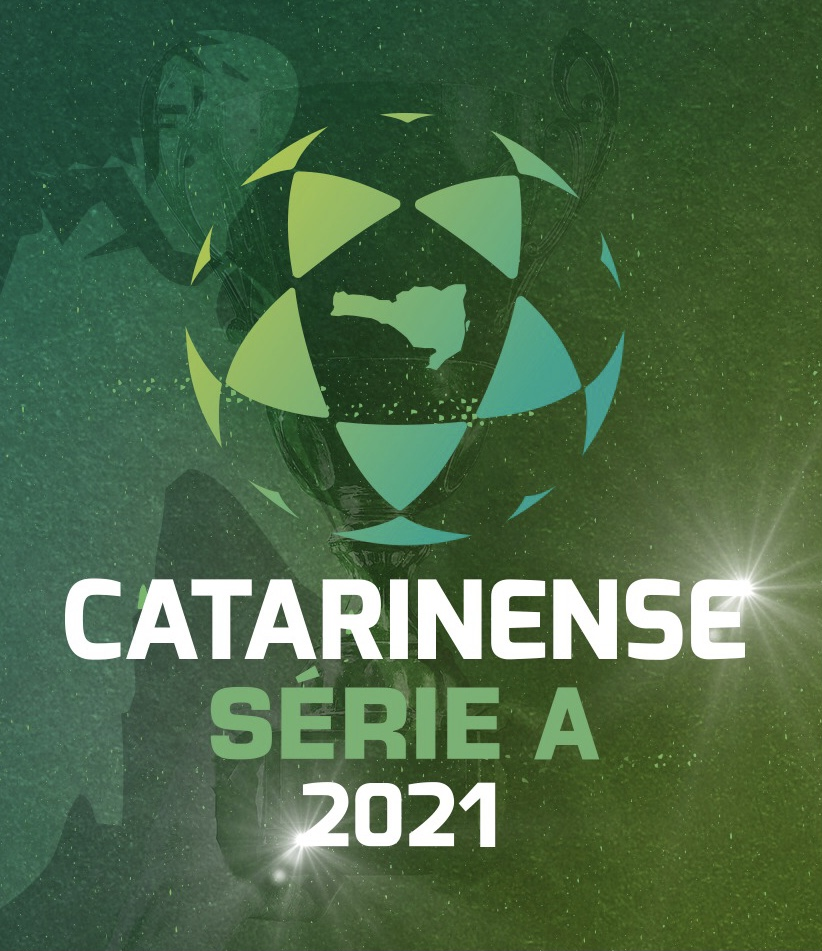
Official logo of the 2021 Campeonato Catarinense (Santa Catarina State Championship)

The Campeonato Catarinense de Futebol Profissional da Série A de 2021, known as the 2021 Campeonato Catarinense, was the 96th season of Santa Catarina's top-flight football league. The season began on 24 February and ended on 26 May 2021.

On 3 March, FCF suspended the tournament due to the COVID-19 pandemic in Brazil. Although the Campeonato Catarinense was suspended some postponed matches were played. The tournament resumed on 20 March.

In the finals, Avaí defeated the defending champions Chapecoense 3–2 on aggregate to win their 18th title.

== Format ==
The tournament was contested between 12 teams, who first played in a single round-robin tournament. In the first stage, the bottom two teams were relegated to next year's Série B. The final stage was played on a home-and-away two-legged basis. Champions and runners-up qualified for the 2022 Copa do Brasil, while three teams qualified for the 2022 Campeonato Brasileiro Série D.

== Participating teams ==
Club	Home city	2020 result	Titles (last)
Avaí	Florianópolis	5th	17 (2019)
Brusque	Brusque	2nd	1 (1992)
Chapecoense	Chapecó	1st	7 (2020)
Concórdia	Concórdia	9th	0
Criciúma	Criciúma	3rd	10 (2013)
Figueirense	Florianópolis	6th	18 (2018)
Hercílio Luz	Tubarão	2nd (Série B)	2 (1958)
Joinville	Joinville	8th	12 (2001)
Juventus	Jaraguá do Sul	4th	0
Marcílio Dias	Itajaí	7th	1 (1963)
Metropolitano	Blumenau	3rd (Série B)	0
Próspera	Criciúma	1st (Série B)	0

== First stage ==
=== Table and Results ===
Pos	Team	Pld	W	D	L	GF	GA	GD	Pts	Qualification or relegation	CHA	BRU	AVA	JUV	MCD	PRO	JEC	FIG	CON	HER	CRI	MET
1	Chapecoense	11	8	2	1	23	6	+17	26	Advance to Final stage		0–0	2–1	2–0		3–1				0–1		5–0
2	Brusque	11	6	4	1	19	9	+10	22	Advance to Final stage			2–0	4–0		3–1		2–2		2–1		1–0
3	Avaí	11	6	3	2	10	5	+5	21	Advance to Final stage				2–0	0–0		1–0	1–0	0–0	2–0		
4	Juventus	11	5	3	3	16	17	−1	18	Advance to Final stage					1–1		3–2	3–2	2–1	2–0	2–0	
5	Marcílio Dias	11	3	6	2	11	9	+2	15	Advance to Final stage	2–2	1–2				2–0			3–2		1–1	
6	Próspera	11	4	2	5	10	16	−6	14	Advance to Final stage			1–1	0–0			0–1	1–0				2–0
7	Joinville	11	3	4	4	10	13	−3	13	Advance to Final stage	0–3	0–0			0–0				1–1		1–0	
8	Figueirense	11	2	5	4	12	11	+1	11	Advance to Final stage	1–3				0–0		1–1		3–0	3–0	0–0	
9	Concórdia	11	2	4	5	11	15	−4	10		0–2	2–1				4–0					0–0	1–3
10	Hercílio Luz (Note: Hercílio Luz were deducted three points.)	11	3	3	5	12	18	−6	9						1–0	2–3	4–3		0–0			2–2
11	Criciúma (R)	11	1	5	5	6	10	−4	8	Relegation to the Série B	0–1	2–2	0–1			0–1				1–1		2–0
12	Metropolitano (R)	11	1	3	7	8	19	−11	6	Relegation to the Série B			0–1	3–3	0–1		0–1	0–0				

Source: FCF
Rules for classification: 1) Points; 2) Wins; 3) Goal difference; 4) Goals scored; 5) Head-to-head result (only in a two-way tie); 6) Fewest red cards; 7) Fewest yellow cards; 8) Draw.
(R) Relegated

== Final stage ==
Starting from the quarter-finals, the teams played a single-elimination tournament. The matches were played on a home-and-away two-legged basis, with the higher-seeded team hosting the second leg. If tied on aggregate, the higher-seeded team would qualified.

=== Bracket ===
Quarter-finals
6	Próspera	0	1	1
3	Avaí	1	2	3
7	Joinville	2	0	2
2	Brusque	2	1	3
5	Marcílio Dias	1	1	2
4	Juventus	0	0	0
8	Figueirense	3	0	3
1	Chapecoense	1	2	3

Semi-finals
3	Avaí	0	1	1
2	Brusque	0	0	0
5	Marcílio Dias	1	1	2
1	Chapecoense	4	1	5

Finals
3	Avaí	2	1	3
1	Chapecoense	1	1	2

=== Quarter-finals ===
Team 1	Agg.	Team 2	1st leg	2nd leg
Figueirense	3–3	Chapecoense	3–1	0–2
Joinville	2–3	Brusque	2–2	0–1
Próspera	1–3	Avaí	0–1	1–2
Marcílio Dias	2–0	Juventus	1–0	1–0

==== Group A ====
Originally, the Group A would be played between the first stage winners Chapecoense and the 8th place Hercílio Luz. The match Hercílio Luz v Chapecoense, 0–0, was played on 25 April 2021 at Estádio Aníbal Torres Costa in Tubarão. The match Chapecoense v Hercílio Luz, 1–0, was played on 28 April 2021 at Arena Condá in Chapecó. Chapecoense won 1–0 on aggregate and qualified for the semi-finals. However, on 29 April 2021, the FCF announced that was investigating Hercílio Luz to find out if they potentially fielded an ineligible player (Alisson) against Brusque in the first stage. Due to this, FCF suspended the semi-finals between Marcílio Dias and Chapecoense.

On 4 May 2021, Hercílio Luz were deducted three points and sanctioned with a fine of R$15,000 (reduced later to R$10,000) after they were punished by Tribunal de Justiça Desportiva do Futebol de Santa Catarina (TJD–SC). TJD–SC also annulled the results of the quarter-finals between Chapecoense and Hercílio Luz and ordered that the quarter-finals be replayed between Chapecoense and the new 8th place Figueirense.

9 May 2021
16:00

Figueirense	3–1	Chapecoense
Tiago Coser 13' (o.g.); Breno 19'; Giva 25'	Report	Anselmo Ramon 63'

Estádio Orlando Scarpelli, Florianópolis
Attendance: 45
Referee: Diego da Costa Cidral

12 May 2021
20:30

Chapecoense	2–0	Figueirense
Laércio 5'; Derlan 56'	Report

Arena Condá, Chapecó
Attendance: 38
Referee: Ramon Abatti Abel

Chapecoense qualified for the semi-finals.

==== Group B ====
25 April 2021
16:00

Joinville	2–2	Brusque
Thiago Santos 3'; Alison 41' (pen.)	Report	Thiago Alagoano 30'; Bruno Mota 90+1'

Arena Joinville, Joinville
Attendance: 39
Referee: Rafael Traci

28 April 2021
19:00

Brusque	1–0	Joinville
Thiago Alagoano 78'	Report

Estádio Augusto Bauer, Brusque
Attendance: 38
Referee: Rodrigo D’Alonso Ferreira

Brusque qualified for the semi-finals.

==== Group C ====
25 April 2021
19:00

Próspera	0–1	Avaí
	Report	Jonathan 90+4'

Estádio Heriberto Hülse, Criciúma
Attendance: 39
Referee: Diego da Costa Cidral

28 April 2021
20:30

Avaí	2–1	Próspera
Edílson 34' (pen.); Matheus Lucas 83'	Report	Lucas Sebastian 58'

Estádio da Ressacada, Florianópolis
Attendance: 37
Referee: Bráulio da Silva Machado

Avaí qualified for the semi-finals.

==== Group D ====
25 April 2021
19:00

Marcílio Dias	1–0	Juventus
David Batista 20'	Report

Estádio Hercílio Luz, Itajaí
Attendance: 31
Referee: Ramon Abatti Abel

28 April 2021
19:00

Juventus	0–1	Marcílio Dias
	Report	Wallace 53'

Estádio João Marcatto, Jaraguá do Sul
Attendance: 35
Referee: Luiz Augusto Silveira Tisne

Marcílio Dias qualified for the semi-finals.

=== Semi-finals ===
Team 1	Agg.	Team 2	1st leg	2nd leg
Marcílio Dias	2–5	Chapecoense	1–4	1–1
Avaí	1–0	Brusque	0–0	1–0

==== Group F ====
16 May 2021
16:00

Marcílio Dias	1–4	Chapecoense
Wallace 44'	Report	Anselmo Ramon 30'; Perotti 49'; Ronei 82'; Fernandinho 90+2'

Estádio Hercílio Luz, Itajaí
Attendance: 45
Referee: Luiz Augusto Silveira Tisne

19 May 2021
15:30

Chapecoense	1–1	Marcílio Dias
Perotti 90+2'	Report	Nathan Ferreira 9'

Arena Condá, Chapecó
Attendance: 39
Referee: William Machado Steffen

Chapecoense qualified for the finals.

==== Group G ====
2 May 2021
16:00

Avaí	0–0	Brusque
	Report

Estádio da Ressacada, Florianópolis
Attendance: 42
Referee: Ramon Abatti Abel

19 May 2021 (Note: The match slated for 9 May 2021 was rescheduled for 19 May 2021.)
20:30

Brusque	0–1	Avaí
	Report	Edílson 66'

Estádio Augusto Bauer, Brusque
Attendance: 41
Referee: Bráulio da Silva Machado

Avaí qualified for the finals.

=== Finals ===
Team 1	Agg.	Team 2	1st leg	2nd leg
Avaí	3–2	Chapecoense	2–1	1–1

==== Group H ====
23 May 2021
16:00

Avaí	2–1	Chapecoense
Lourenço 64'; Vinícius Leite 90+3'	Report	Anderson Leite 77'

Estádio da Ressacada, Florianópolis
Attendance: 123
Referee: Luiz Augusto Silveira Tisne

26 May 2021
16:00

Chapecoense	1–1	Avaí
Perotti 90+5'	Report	Giovanni 69'

Arena Condá, Chapecó
Attendance: 125
Referee: Ramon Abatti Abel

== General table ==
Pos	Team	Pld	W	D	L	GF	GA	GD	Pts	Qualification or relegation
1	Avaí	17	10	5	2	17	8	+9	35	Champions and 2022 Copa do Brasil
2	Chapecoense	17	10	4	3	33	14	+19	34	Runners-up and 2022 Copa do Brasil
3	Brusque	15	7	6	2	22	12	+10	27	
4	Marcílio Dias	15	5	7	3	15	14	+1	22	2022 Série D
5	Juventus	13	5	3	5	16	19	−3	18	2022 Série D
6	Próspera	13	4	2	7	11	19	−8	14	2022 Série D
7	Figueirense	13	3	5	5	15	14	+1	14	
8	Joinville	13	3	5	5	12	16	−4	14	
9	Concórdia	11	2	4	5	11	15	−4	10	
10	Hercílio Luz (Note: Hercílio Luz were deducted three points.)	11	3	3	5	12	18	−6	9	
11	Criciúma	11	1	5	5	6	10	−4	8	Relegation to 2022 Catarinense Série B
12	Metropolitano	11	1	3	7	8	19	−11	6	Relegation to 2022 Catarinense Série B

Source: FCF

== Top goalscorers ==
No.	Player	Club	Goals
1	Perotti	Chapecoense	15
2	Thiago Alagoano	Brusque	7
3	Júnior Pirambu	Brusque	6
