= 2020 Campeonato Catarinense =

Campeonato Catarinense
- Season: 2020
- Dates: 22 January - 13 September
- Champions: Chapecoense (7th title)
- Relegated: Tubarão
- Copa do Brasil: Brusque; Chapecoense
- Série D: Joinville; Juventus; Marcílio Dias
- Matches played: 61
- Goals scored: 129 (2.11 per match)
- Top goalscorer: Edu (8 goals)

The Campeonato Catarinense de Futebol Profissional da Série A de 2020, known as the 2020 Campeonato Catarinense, was the 95th season of Santa Catarina's top-flight football league. The season began on 22 January and ended on 13 September 2020.

On 16 March 2020, FCF suspended the Campeonato Catarinense indefinitely due to the COVID-19 pandemic in Brazil. Complying with the guidelines of the Governo do Estado de Santa Catarina, the tournament resumed behind closed doors on 8 July 2020.

After the quarter-final first legs, played on 8 and 9 July 2020, several players and staff of Chapecoense, Criciúma, Figueirense, Joinville, and Marcílio Dias tested positive for COVID-19. Because of this, on 13 July 2020, the Governo de Santa Catarina and FCF suspended the tournament until 27 July 2020. Due to the spread of COVID-19, on 24 July 2020, the Governo de Santa Catarina extended the suspension until 7 August 2020, but a subsequent agreement between FCF and the Governo de Santa Catarina lifted the suspension. Finally, the tournament resumed again on 29 July 2020.

In the finals, Chapecoense defeated Brusque 3–0 on aggregate to win their seventh title.

Avaí were the defending champions but they were eliminated in the quarter-finals.

== Format ==
The tournament was contested between 10 teams, who first played in a single round-robin tournament. The bottom two teams played a relegation play-off to next year's Série B. The final stage and the relegation play-off were played on a home-and-away two-legged basis. Champions and runners-up qualified for the 2021 Copa do Brasil, while three teams qualified for the 2021 Campeonato Brasileiro Série D.

== Participating teams ==
Club	Home city	2019 result	Titles (last)
Avaí	Florianópolis	1st	17 (2019)
Brusque	Brusque	6th	1 (1992)
Chapecoense	Chapecó	2nd	6 (2017)
Concórdia	Concórdia	2nd (Série B)	0
Criciúma	Criciúma	4th	10 (2013)
Figueirense	Florianópolis	3rd	18 (2018)
Joinville	Joinville	7th	12 (2001)
Juventus^{[a]}	Jaraguá do Sul	3rd (Série B)	0
Marcílio Dias	Itajaí	5th	1 (1963)
Tubarão	Tubarão	8th	0

^{a} Almirante Barroso (2019 Série B champions) declined to participate in the tournament. They were replaced by Juventus (2019 Série B 3rd place).

== First stage ==
=== Table and Results ===
Pos	Team	Pld	W	D	L	GF	GA	GD	Pts	Qualification	AVA	BRU	FIG	MCD	CRI	JUV	JEC	CHA	CON	TUB
1	Avaí	9	5	2	2	12	6	+6	17	Advance to Final stage		0–1		3–1	0–1	2–1	2–1			
2	Brusque	9	5	2	2	13	9	+4	17	Advance to Final stage						1–0	5–4		1–1	1–1
3	Figueirense	9	4	3	2	8	5	+3	15	Advance to Final stage	0–2	1–0				0–0	2–1	0–0		
4	Marcílio Dias	9	4	3	2	9	9	0	15	Advance to Final stage		1–0	2–1					1–0	2–1	0–0
5	Criciúma	9	3	4	2	9	9	0	13	Advance to Final stage		1–3	0–0	1–1					2–1	0–0
6	Juventus	9	3	2	4	10	10	0	11	Advance to Final stage				2–0	3–2		2–3		0–0	
7	Joinville	9	3	1	5	13	17	−4	10	Advance to Final stage				1–1	0–1				2–1	1–0
8	Chapecoense	9	2	4	3	8	6	+2	10	Advance to Final stage	0–0	0–1			1–1	0–1	3–0			
9	Concórdia	9	1	4	4	10	12	−2	7	Relegation play-off	1–1		0–2					1–1		4–1
10	Tubarão	9	1	3	5	5	14	−9	6	Relegation play-off	0–2		0–2			2–1		1–3		

Source: FCF
Rules for classification: 1) Points; 2) Wins; 3) Goal difference; 4) Goals scored; 5) Head-to-head result; 6) Fewest red cards; 7) Fewest yellow cards; 8) Draw.

== Relegation play-off ==
The play-off was played on a home-and-away two-legged basis, with the higher-seeded hosting the second leg. If tied on aggregate the lower-seeded would be relegated.

Team 1	Agg.	Team 2	1st leg	2nd leg
Tubarão	1–4	Concórdia	0–2	1–2

=== Matches ===
1 August 2020 (Note: The match originally slated for 14 July 2020, and later rescheduled for 27 July 2020, was rescheduled again for 1 August 2020.)
15:00

Tubarão	0–2	Concórdia
	Report	Warley 54'; Diego Felipe 83'

Estádio Domingos Silveira Gonzales, Tubarão
Attendance: 0
Referee: Rodrigo D'Alonso Ferreira

5 August 2020 (Note: The match originally slated for 19 July 2020, and later rescheduled for 31 July 2020, was rescheduled again for 5 August 2020.)
15:00

Concórdia	2–1	Tubarão
Cleison Tetê 35'; Warley 39'	Report	Kevin 74'

Estádio Domingos Machado de Lima, Concórdia
Attendance: 0
Referee: Héber Lopes

Tubarão were relegated.

== Final stage ==
Starting from the quarter-finals, the teams played a single-elimination tournament. The matches were played on a home-and-away two-legged basis, with the higher-seeded team hosting the second leg. If tied on aggregate, the penalty shoot-out would be used to determine the winner.

=== Bracket ===
Quarter-finals
8	Chapecoense	2	1	3
1	Avaí	0	1	1
5	Criciúma	0	1	1
4	Marcílio Dias	0	0	0
6	Juventus	1	4	5
3	Figueirense	2	1	3
7	Joinville	0	1	1
2	Brusque	1	2	3

Semi-finals
8	Chapecoense (p)	1	0	1 (4)
5	Criciúma	0	1	1 (2)
6	Juventus	2	0	2
2	Brusque	3	0	3

Finals
8	Chapecoense	2	1	3
2	Brusque	0	0	0

=== Quarter-finals ===
Team 1	Agg.	Team 2	1st leg	2nd leg
Chapecoense	3–1	Avaí	2–0	1–1
Joinville	1–3	Brusque	0–1	1–2
Juventus	5–3	Figueirense	1–2	4–1
Criciúma	1–0	Marcílio Dias	0–0	1–0

==== Group A ====
8 July 2020
20:30

Chapecoense	2–0	Avaí
Luiz Otávio 54'; Anselmo Ramon 70'	Report

Arena Condá, Chapecó
Attendance: 0
Referee: Rafael Traci

30 July 2020 (Note: The match originally slated for 12 July 2020, and later rescheduled for 29 July 2020, was rescheduled again for 30 July 2020.)
20:00

Avaí	1–1	Chapecoense
Daniel Amorim 22'	Report	Aylon 28'

Estádio da Ressacada, Florianópolis
Attendance: 0
Referee: Rafael Traci

Chapecoense qualified for the semi-finals.

==== Group B ====
9 July 2020
19:00

Joinville	0–1	Brusque
	Report	Thiago Alagoano 66'

Arena Joinville, Joinville
Attendance: 0
Referee: Rodrigo D’Alonso Ferreira

30 July 2020 (Note: The match originally slated for 12 July 2020, and later rescheduled for 29 July 2020, was rescheduled again for 30 July 2020.)
18:00

Brusque	2–1	Joinville
Marco Antônio 20'; Edu 66' (pen.)	Report	Matheus Trindade 79'

Estádio Augusto Bauer, Brusque
Attendance: 0
Referee: Fernando Henrique de Medeiros Miranda

Brusque qualified for the semi-finals.

==== Group C ====
9 July 2020
15:00

Juventus	1–2	Figueirense
Geovane Itinga 81'	Report	Pedro Lucas 11'; Diego Gonçalves 27'

Estádio João Marcatto, Jaraguá do Sul
Attendance: 0
Referee: Bráulio da Silva Machado

29 July 2020 (Note: The match originally slated for 12 July 2020, and later rescheduled for 28 July 2020, was rescheduled again for 29 July 2020.)
21:30

Figueirense	1–4	Juventus
Alemão 62'	Report	Geovane Itinga 32'; Allan 46'; Marllon 87', 90+6'

Estádio Orlando Scarpelli, Florianópolis
Attendance: 0
Referee: Luiz Augusto Silveira Tisne

Juventus qualified for the semi-finals.

==== Group D ====
8 July 2020
19:00

Criciúma	0–0	Marcílio Dias
	Report

Estádio Heriberto Hülse, Criciúma
Attendance: 0
Referee: Diego da Costa Cidral

30 July 2020 (Note: The match originally slated for 11 July 2020, rescheduled for 12 July 2020 and later rescheduled again for 28 July 2020, was rescheduled finally for 30 July 2020.)
16:00

Marcílio Dias	0–1	Criciúma
	Report	Jean Dias 43'

Estádio Hercílio Luz, Itajaí
Attendance: 0
Referee: Diego da Costa Cidral

Criciúma qualified for the semi-finals.

=== Semi-finals ===
Team 1	Agg.	Team 2	1st leg	2nd leg
Chapecoense	1–1 (4–2 p)	Criciúma	1–0	0–1
Juventus	2–3	Brusque	2–3	0–0

==== Group F ====
2 August 2020
18:00

Chapecoense	1–0	Criciúma
Paulinho Moccelin 46'	Report

Arena Condá, Chapecó
Attendance: 0
Referee: Fernando Henrique de Medeiros Miranda

5 August 2020
21:30

Criciúma	1–0	Chapecoense
Foguinho 4'	Report
Penalties
Agenor (penalty scored); Foguinho (penalty missed); Jean Dias (penalty missed); Vitão (penalty scored)	2–4	(penalty missed) Ezequiel; (penalty scored) Derlan; (penalty scored) Paulinho Moccelin; (penalty scored) Luiz Otávio; (penalty scored) Anselmo Ramon

Estádio Heriberto Hülse, Criciúma
Attendance: 0
Referee: Rafael Traci

Chapecoense qualified for the finals.

==== Group G ====
2 August 2020
16:00

Juventus	2–3	Brusque
Gustavo Poffo 45+1'; Fabinho 65'	Report	Thiago Alagoano 32', 64'; Edu 41'

Estádio João Marcatto, Jaraguá do Sul
Attendance: 0
Referee: Ramon Abatti Abel

5 August 2020
19:00

Brusque	0–0	Juventus
	Report

Estádio Augusto Bauer, Brusque
Attendance: 0
Referee: Ramon Abatti Abel

Brusque qualified for the finals.

=== Finals ===
Team 1	Agg.	Team 2	1st leg	2nd leg
Chapecoense	3–0	Brusque	2–0	1–0

==== Group H ====
9 September 2020
21:30

Chapecoense	2–0	Brusque
Luiz Otávio 21'; Joílson 73'	Report

Arena Condá, Chapecó
Attendance: 0
Referee: Diego da Costa Cidral

13 September 2020
16:00

Brusque	0–1	Chapecoense
	Report	Anselmo Ramon 68'

Estádio Augusto Bauer, Brusque
Attendance: 0
Referee: Rodrigo D’Alonso Ferreira

== General table ==
Pos	Team	Pld	W	D	L	GF	GA	GD	Pts	Qualification or relegation
1	Chapecoense	15	6	5	4	15	8	+7	23	Champions and 2021 Copa do Brasil
2	Brusque	15	8	3	4	19	15	+4	27	Runners-up and 2021 Copa do Brasil
3	Criciúma	13	5	5	3	11	10	+1	20	
4	Juventus	13	4	3	6	17	16	+1	15	2021 Série D
5	Avaí	11	5	3	3	13	9	+4	18	
6	Figueirense	11	5	3	3	11	10	+1	18	
7	Marcílio Dias	11	4	4	3	9	10	−1	16	2021 Série D
8	Joinville	11	3	1	7	14	20	−6	10	2021 Série D
9	Concórdia	11	3	4	4	14	13	+1	13	
10	Tubarão	11	1	3	7	6	18	−12	6	Relegation to 2021 Catarinense Série B

Source: FCF

== Top goalscorers ==
No.	Player	Club	Goals
1	Edu	Brusque	8
2	Thiago Alagoano	Brusque	6
3	Marllon	Juventus	5
4	Carlos César	Criciúma	4
4	Geovane Itinga	Juventus	4
4	Luquinhas	Joinville	4
