= Guilherme (footballer, born 2000) =

Brazilian footballer

Gui Mendes
Personal information
- Full name: Guilherme Mendes Ribeiro
- Date of birth: 3 August 2000 (age 26)
- Place of birth: Agudos, Brazil
- Height: 1.77 m (5 ft 10 in)
- Position: Forward

Senior career*
Years	Team	Apps	(Gls)
2018–2021	Ituano	25	(8)
2020–2021	→ Cruzeiro (loan)	0	(0)
2021–2022	Inter de Limeira	16	(4)
2022	Aparecidense	0	(0)
2023	Athletic	14	(0)
- * Club domestic league appearances and goals as of 10 September 2023

Guilherme Mendes Ribeiro (born 3 August 2000), commonly known as Gui Mendes or Guilherme, is a Brazilian footballer who plays as a forward.

== Career statistics ==
=== Club ===
As of 13 August 2020.

Club	Season	League			State League		Cup		Other		Total	
Club	Season	Division	Apps	Goals	Apps	Goals	Apps	Goals	Apps	Goals	Apps	Goals
Ituano	2018	–			1 (Note: Appearances in the Campeonato Paulista)	0	0	0	10 (Note: Appearances in the Copa Paulista)	0	11	0
Ituano	2019	Série D	11	8	8	0	0	0	0	0	19	8
Ituano	2020	Série C	0	0	5	0	0	0	0	0	5	0
Ituano	Total		11	8	14	0	0	0	10	0	35	8
Cruzeiro (loan)	2020	Série B	0	0	0	0	0	0	0	0	0	0
Career total			11	8	14	0	0	0	10	0	35	8
