= Foguinho (footballer, born 1992) =

Brazilian footballer

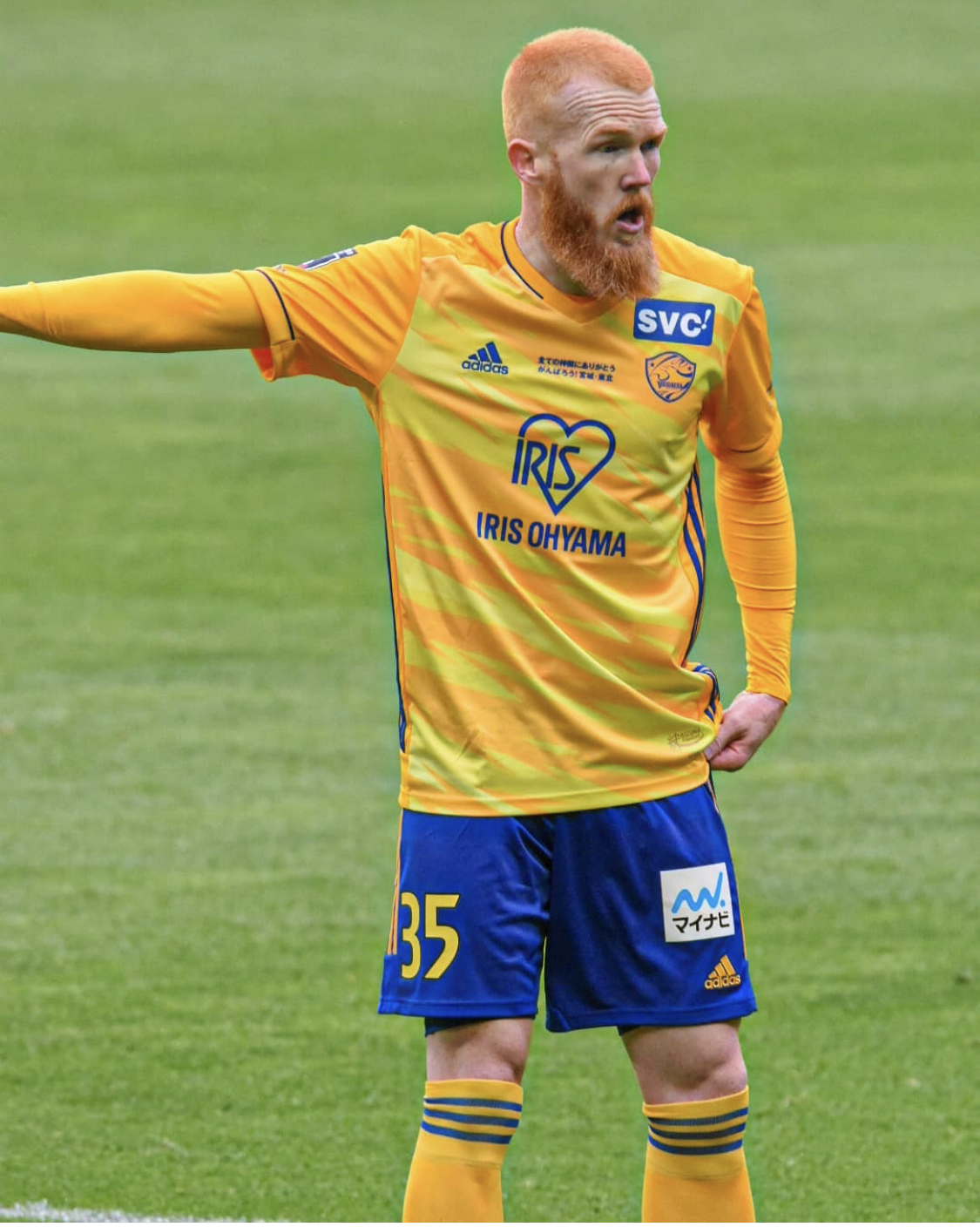

Personal information
- Full name: Guilherme Seefeldt Krolow
- Date of birth: 15 June 1992 (age 34)
- Place of birth: São Lourenço do Sul, Brazil
- Height: 1.80 m (5 ft 11 in)
- Position: Midfielder

Team information
- Current team: São Bernardo
- Number: 8

Youth career
- 2010–2011: Grêmio

Senior career*
Years	Team	Apps	(Gls)
2010–2012	Pelotas		
2012–2013	Ferroviário	26	(1)
2013	Ceará	2	(0)
2013	→ Mirassol (loan)		
2014	Icasa	39	(4)
2015	Oeste	8	(1)
2016–2017	Aparecidense	33	(1)
2017	Chaves	0	(0)
2018	Cruzeiro-RS	11	(0)
2018–2019	Caxias	28	(3)
2019–2020	Criciúma	46	(6)
2020–2021	Avaí	3	(0)
2021–2023	Vegalta Sendai	64	(6)
2024	Chapecoense	41	(2)
2025–	São Bernardo	61	(4)
- * Club domestic league appearances and goals as of 18 November 2026

Guilherme Seefeldt Krolow (born 15 June 1992), commonly known as Foguinho (little fire in Portuguese, because of his reddish hair and beard), is a Brazilian footballer who plays as a midfielder for São Bernardo.

== Career statistics ==
=== Club ===
As of 27 October 2022.

Club	Season	League			State League		National Cup		League Cup		Other		Total	
Club	Season	Division	Apps	Goals	Apps	Goals	Apps	Goals	Apps	Goals	Apps	Goals	Apps	Goals
Pelotas	2010	Série D	0	0	3 (Note: Appearances in the Campeonato Gaúcho)	0	0	0	–		0	0	3	0
Pelotas	2011	–												
Pelotas	2012	–			4	0	0	0	–		0	0	4	0
Pelotas	Total		0	0	7	0	0	0	0	0	0	0	7	0
Ferroviário	2012	–			0	0	0	0	–		0	0	0	0
Ferroviário	2013	–			26 (Note: Appearances in the Campeonato Cearense)	1	0	0	–		0	0	26	1
Ferroviário	Total		0	0	26	1	0	0	0	0	0	0	26	1
Ceará	2013	Série B	2	0	0	0	0	0	–		0	0	2	0
Icasa	2014	Série B	17	1	22	3	0	0	–		0	0	39	4
Oeste	2015	Série B	2	0	7 (Note: Appearances in the Campeonato Paulista A2)	0	0	0	–		0	0	9	0
Aparecidense	2016	Série D	7	1	13 (Note: Appearances in the Campeonato Goiano)	0	3 (Note: Appearances in the Copa do Brasil)	1	–		3 (Note: Appearances in the Copa Verde)	0	26	2
Aparecidense	2017	Série D	0	0	13	0	0	0	–		0	0	13	0
Aparecidense	Total		7	1	26	0	3	1	0	0	3	0	39	2
Chaves	2017–18	Primeira Liga	0	0	–		0	0	–		0	0	0	0
Cruzeiro-RS	2018	–			11	0	0	0	–		0	0	11	0
Caxias	2018	Série D	4	0	0	0	0	0	–		0	0	4	0
Caxias	2019	Série D	10	0	14	3	0	0	–		0	0	24	4
Caxias	Total		14	0	14	3	0	0	0	0	0	0	28	3
Criciúma	2019	Série B	20	3	0	0	0	0	–		0	0	20	3
Criciúma	2020	Série C	15	1	11 (Note: Appearances in the Campeonato Catarinense)	2	1	0	–		0	0	27	3
Criciúma	Total		35	4	11	2	1	0	0	0	0	0	57	6
Avaí	2020	Série B	1	0	0	0	0	0	–		0	0	1	0
Avaí	2021	Série B	0	0	2	0	0	0	–		0	0	2	0
Avaí	Total		1	0	3	0	0	0	0	0	0	0	4	0
Vegalta Sendai	2021	J1 League	7	0	–		0	0	1 (Note: Appearances in the J.League Cup)	0	0	0	8	0
Vegalta Sendai	2022	J2 League	35	5	–		2	0	–		–		37	5
Career total			120	11	126	9	6	1	1	0	3	0	256	21
