= Ronei =

Brazilian footballer

Personal information
- Full name: Ronei Gebing
- Date of birth: 22 February 1998 (age 28)
- Place of birth: Três Passos, Brazil
- Height: 1.75 m (5 ft 9 in)
- Positions: Right back; midfielder

Team information
- Current team: Caxias

Youth career
- 2010–2013: Juventude
- 2014: Encantado
- 2015–2018: Chapecoense

Senior career*
Years	Team	Apps	(Gls)
2017–2023	Chapecoense	124	(1)
2024	Brusque	25	(0)
2025–	Caxias	21	(0)
- * Club domestic league appearances and goals as of 1 July 2026

Ronei Gebing (born 22 February 1998), simply known as Ronei, is a Brazilian footballer who plays for Caxias as either a right back or a midfielder.

== Club career ==
Ronei was born in Três Passos, Rio Grande do Sul, and joined Chapecoense's youth setup in 2015, from EC Encantado. He made his first team debut on 9 February 2017, coming on as a half-time substitute in a 0–2 away loss against Cruzeiro in the Primeira Liga.

Ronei subsequently returned to the youth sides until the 2019 campaign, when he was promoted to the main squad. He made his Série A debut on 4 December of that year, playing the last 15 minutes of a 3–0 home win against CSA.

In the 2020 campaign, Ronei became a regular starter under manager Umberto Louzer, and contributed with 23 league appearances as Chape returned to the top tier as champions.

== Career statistics ==
As of 25 October 2021

Club	Season	League			State League		Cup		Continental		Other		Total	
Club	Season	Division	Apps	Goals	Apps	Goals	Apps	Goals	Apps	Goals	Apps	Goals	Apps	Goals
Chapecoense	2017	Série A	0	0	0	0	0	0	—		1 (Note: Appearance(s) in Primeira Liga)	0	1	0
Chapecoense	2018	Série A	0	0	0	0	0	0	—		—		0	0
Chapecoense	2019	Série A	1	0	1	0	0	0	—		—		2	0
Chapecoense	2020	Série B	23	0	9	0	0	0	—		—		32	0
Chapecoense	2021	Série A	9	0	12	1	2	0	—		1 (Note: Appearance(s) in Recopa Catarinense)	0	24	1
Career total			33	0	22	1	2	0	0	0	2	0	59	1

== Honours ==
Chapecoense

- Campeonato Catarinense: 2020
- Campeonato Brasileiro Série B: 2020
