= 2018 Copa Paulista =

Tournament details
- Country: São Paulo (state), Brazil
- Teams: 27

Final positions
- Champions: Votuporanguense
- Runners-up: Ferroviária

Tournament statistics
- Matches played: 218
- Goals scored: 501 (2.3 per match)
- Top goal scorer(s): Felipe Henrique Jose dos Santos (Olímpia); Leonardo Luiz e Castro (Red Bull Brasil)

The 2018 Copa Paulista was the 20th edition of São Paulo State Cup. 27 teams participate in the tournament. The winner gets to choose between a qualification spot for the 2019 Copa do Brasil or the 2019 Campeonato Brasileiro Série D. The spot not chosen by the winners will be taken by the second-placed team.

Votuporanguense defeated Ferroviária on the finals to win their first title. As champions, Votuporanguense chose to qualify to the 2019 Copa do Brasil and thus Ferroviária qualified to the 2019 Campeonato Brasileiro Série D.

== Format ==
First Stage: The clubs will be divided into four groups according to their location. The top four of each group will advance to the second stage.

Second Stage: The 16 clubs will be divided into four groups of four. The winner and runners-up of each group will advance to the Knockout stage.

Each stage will be played in a double round-robin format.

== Qualified teams ==
- Água Santa
- Atibaia
- Audax
- Batatais
- Bragantino
- Desportivo Brasil
- Ferroviária
- Inter de Limeira
- Ituano
- Juventus
- Mirassol
- Nacional
- Noroeste
- Novorizontino
- Olímpia
- Penapolense
- Portuguesa
- Red Bull Brasil
- Rio Claro
- Santo André
- Santos
- São Bernardo
- São Caetano
- Taboão da Serra
- Taubaté
- Votuporanguense
- XV de Piracicaba

== First stage ==
=== Group 1 ===
Pos	Team	Pld	W	D	L	GF	GA	GD	Pts
1	Mirassol	10	6	3	1	13	4	+9	21
2	Olímpia	10	6	3	1	14	7	+7	21
3	Votuporanguense	10	5	1	4	12	7	+5	16
4	Novorizontino	10	3	4	3	11	10	+1	13
5	Penapolense	10	2	1	7	5	22	−17	7
6	Batatais	10	1	2	7	7	12	−5	5

=== Group 2 ===
Pos	Team	Pld	W	D	L	GF	GA	GD	Pts
1	Ferroviária	12	6	4	2	15	9	+6	22
2	Red Bull Brasil	12	4	7	1	16	9	+7	19
3	XV de Piracicaba	12	4	5	3	15	14	+1	17
4	Rio Claro	12	3	5	4	7	9	−2	14
5	Inter de Limeira	12	3	4	5	11	13	−2	13
6	Noroeste	12	3	4	5	11	16	−5	13
7	Desportivo Brasil	12	2	5	5	7	12	−5	11

=== Group 3 ===
Pos	Team	Pld	W	D	L	GF	GA	GD	Pts
1	São Caetano	12	7	5	0	14	3	+11	26
2	Taubaté	12	7	3	2	16	9	+7	24
3	Santo André	12	6	3	3	12	6	+6	21
4	São Bernardo	12	5	3	4	11	8	+3	18
5	Santos	12	4	2	6	16	18	−2	14
6	Bragantino	12	2	4	6	13	19	−6	10
7	Água Santa	12	0	2	10	6	25	−19	2

=== Group 4 ===
Pos	Team	Pld	W	D	L	GF	GA	GD	Pts
1	Ituano	12	8	2	2	25	14	+11	26
2	Atibaia	12	7	1	4	24	17	+7	22
3	Juventus	12	6	2	4	16	12	+4	20
4	Audax	12	6	1	5	15	13	+2	19
5	Portuguesa	12	5	3	4	11	10	+1	18
6	Nacional	12	4	1	7	15	19	−4	13
7	Taboão da Serra	12	0	2	10	15	36	−21	2

== Second stage ==
=== Group 5 ===
Pos	Team	Pld	W	D	L	GF	GA	GD	Pts
1	Mirassol	6	3	2	1	7	5	+2	11
2	Red Bull Brasil	6	2	3	1	8	5	+3	9
3	Santo André	6	2	2	2	8	10	−2	8
4	Audax	6	1	1	4	5	8	−3	4

=== Group 6 ===
Pos	Team	Pld	W	D	L	GF	GA	GD	Pts
1	Ferroviária	6	5	0	1	13	2	+11	15
2	Olímpia	6	3	1	2	7	9	−2	10
3	São Bernardo	6	2	1	3	8	9	−1	7
4	Juventus	6	0	2	4	3	11	−8	2

=== Group 7 ===
Pos	Team	Pld	W	D	L	GF	GA	GD	Pts
1	Votuporanguense	6	4	1	1	9	6	+3	13
2	Atibaia	6	2	3	1	6	5	+1	9
3	Rio Claro	6	0	5	1	4	5	−1	5
4	São Caetano	6	0	3	3	3	6	−3	3

=== Group 8 ===
Pos	Team	Pld	W	D	L	GF	GA	GD	Pts
1	Novorizontino	6	3	2	1	7	6	+1	11
2	Taubaté	6	2	4	0	8	6	+2	10
3	XV de Piracicaba	6	2	2	2	6	6	0	8
4	Ituano	6	1	0	5	6	9	−3	3

== Final stage ==
=== Bracket ===
Quarterfinals
Novorizontino	1	2	3
Ferroviária (a)	1	2	3
Red Bull Brasil	1	3	4
Mirassol	1	2	3
Atibaia	2	1	3
Olímpia	1	1	2
Votuporanguense	4	0	4
Taubaté	2	1	3

Semifinals
Ferroviária	2	2	4
Red Bull Brasil	0	2	2
Atibaia	1	0	1
Votuporanguense	1	3	4

Finals
Ferroviária	1	1	2 (3)
Votuporanguense (p)	1	1	2 (5)
