= 2019 Campeonato Brasileiro Série D =

Football competition in Brazil

Campeonato Brasileiro Série D
- Season: 2019
- Dates: 4 May – 18 August
- Champions: Brusque (1st title)
- Promoted: Brusque; Ituano; Jacuipense; Manaus
- Matches: 266
- Goals: 639 (2.4 per match)
- Top goalscorer: Júnior Pirambu (10 goals)
- Biggest home win: América de Natal 8–0 Serrano; Group A6, R6, 9 June
- Biggest away win: Serrano 0–6 América de Natal; Group A6, R1, 4 May
- Highest scoring: 8 goals América de Natal 8–0 Serrano; Group A6, R6, 9 June
- Highest attendance: 44,896; Manaus 2–2 (5–6 p) Brusque; Finals, 2nd leg, 18 August
- Lowest attendance: 15; Serrano 1–5 América-PE; Group A6, R3, 19 May
- Total attendance: 318,227
- Average attendance: 1,196

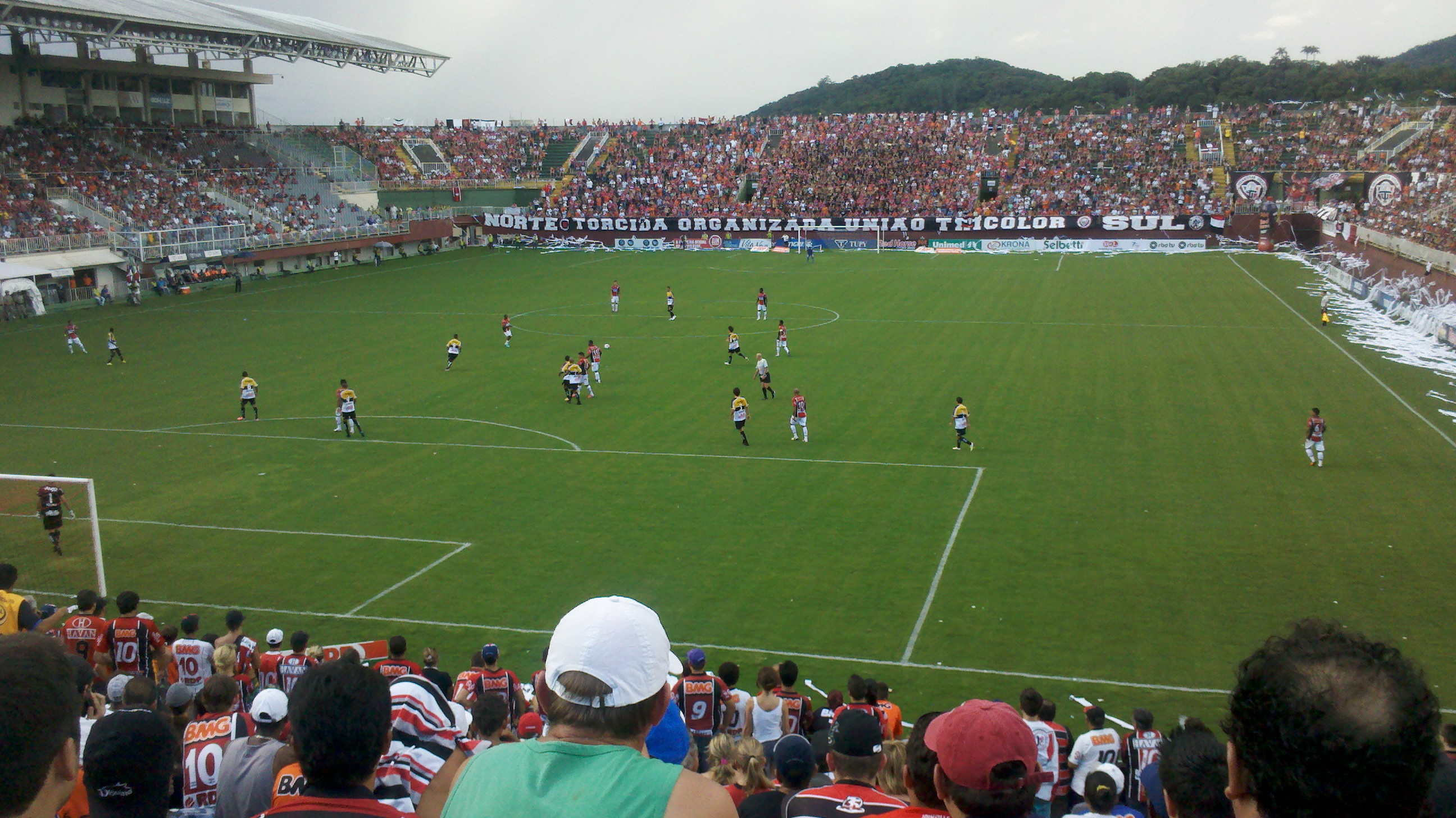
Arena Joinville in Santa Catarina

The 2019 Campeonato Brasileiro Série D was a football competition held in Brazil, equivalent to the fourth division. The competition started on 4 May and ended on 18 August 2019.

Sixty-eight teams competed in the tournament. Sixty-four teams qualified from their state leagues and cups, and four relegated from the 2018 Campeonato Brasileiro Série C (Joinville, Juazeirense, Salgueiro and Tupi).

Brusque, Ituano, Jacuipense and Manaus qualified for the semi-finals and were promoted to the 2020 Campeonato Brasileiro Série C.

The finals between Brusque and Manaus finished in a 4–4 draw on aggregate, but Brusque clinched their first title by winning 6–5 on penalties.

== Teams ==
Location of teams in 2019 Série D

=== Federation ranking ===
The number of teams from each state was chosen based on the CBF State Ranking.

Rank	Federation	Coeff.	Teams	Notes
1	(São Paulo (state)) São Paulo	87.253	4	
2	(Rio de Janeiro (state)) Rio de Janeiro	50.584	3	
3	Minas Gerais	47.813	3	+1 (C)
4	Rio Grande do Sul	39.165	3	
5	(Santa Catarina (state)) Santa Catarina	34.400	3	+1 (C)
6	(Paraná (state)) Paraná	32.444	3	
7	Pernambuco	21.895	3	+1 (C)
8	Bahia	20.871	3	+1 (C)
9	Goiás	19.425	3	
10	Ceará	13.664	2	
11	Alagoas	10.992	2	
12	Pará	9.558	2	
13	Mato Grosso	9.065	2	
14	Rio Grande do Norte	7.997	2	
15	Maranhão	6.574	2	
16	Paraíba	4.989	2	
17	Sergipe	3.864	2	
18	(Acre (state)) Acre	3.006	2	
19	Piauí	2.789	2	
20	(Federal District (Brazil)) Distrito Federal	2.380	2	
21	(Amazonas (Brazilian state)) Amazonas	2.147	2	
22	Mato Grosso do Sul	2.037	2	
23	Tocantins	1.858	2	
24	Espírito Santo	1.799	2	
25	Rondônia	1.737	2	
26	Amapá	1.719	2	
27	Roraima	1.662	2	

=== Participating teams ===
The teams were:

Federation	Team	Home city	Qualification method
(Acre (state)) Acre	Rio Branco	Rio Branco	2018 Campeonato Acriano champions
(Acre (state)) Acre	Galvez	Rio Branco	2018 Campeonato Acriano runners-up
Alagoas	ASA	Arapiraca	2018 Campeonato Alagoano 3rd place
Alagoas	Coruripe	Coruripe	2018 Campeonato Alagoano 4th place
Amapá	Ypiranga	Macapá	2018 Campeonato Amapaense champions
Amapá	Santos	Macapá	2018 Campeonato Amapaense runners-up
(Amazonas (Brazilian state)) Amazonas	Manaus	Manaus	2018 Campeonato Amazonense champions
(Amazonas (Brazilian state)) Amazonas	Fast Clube	Manaus	2018 Campeonato Amazonense runners-up
Bahia	Bahia de Feira	Feira de Santana	2018 Campeonato Baiano 4th place
Bahia	Fluminense de Feira	Feira de Santana	2018 Campeonato Baiano 5th place
Bahia	Jacuipense	Riachão do Jacuípe	2018 Campeonato Baiano 6th place
Bahia	Juazeirense	Juazeiro	2018 Série C Group A 9th place
Ceará	Atlético Cearense^{[a]}	Fortaleza	2018 Campeonato Cearense 3rd place
Ceará	Floresta	Fortaleza	2018 Campeonato Cearense 4th place
Espírito Santo	Serra	Serra	2018 Campeonato Capixaba champions
Espírito Santo	Vitória-ES	Vitória	2018 Copa Espírito Santo champions
(Federal District (Brazil)) Federal District	Sobradinho	Sobradinho	2018 Campeonato Brasiliense champions
(Federal District (Brazil)) Federal District	Brasiliense	Taguatinga	2018 Campeonato Brasiliense runners-up
Goiás	Aparecidense	Aparecida de Goiânia	2018 Campeonato Goiano runners-up
Goiás	Anapolina	Anápolis	2018 Campeonato Goiano 4th place
Goiás	Iporá	Iporá	2018 Campeonato Goiano 5th place
Maranhão	Moto Club	São Luís	2018 Campeonato Maranhense champions
Maranhão	Maranhão	São Luís	2018 Copa Federação Maranhense de Futebol champions
Mato Grosso	Sinop	Sinop	2018 Campeonato Mato-Grossense runners-up
Mato Grosso	União Rondonópolis	Rondonópolis	2018 Campeonato Mato-Grossense 4th place
Mato Grosso do Sul	Operário	Campo Grande	2018 Campeonato Sul-Mato-Grossense champions
Mato Grosso do Sul	Corumbaense	Corumbá	2018 Campeonato Sul-Mato-Grossense runners-up
Minas Gerais	URT	Patos de Minas	2018 Campeonato Mineiro 6th place
Minas Gerais	Patrocinense	Patrocínio	2018 Campeonato Mineiro 8th place
Minas Gerais	Caldense	Poços de Caldas	2018 Campeonato Mineiro 9th place
Minas Gerais	Tupi	Juiz de Fora	2018 Série C Group B 9th place
Pará	Bragantino	Bragança	2018 Campeonato Paraense 3rd place
Pará	São Raimundo-PA	Santarém	2018 Campeonato Paraense 4th place
Paraíba	Campinense	Campina Grande	2018 Campeonato Paraibano runners-up
Paraíba	Serrano	Campina Grande	2018 Campeonato Paraibano 3rd place
(Paraná (state)) Paraná	Foz do Iguaçu	Foz do Iguaçu	2018 Campeonato Paranaense 3rd place
(Paraná (state)) Paraná	Maringá	Maringá	2018 Campeonato Paranaense 5th place
(Paraná (state)) Paraná	Cianorte	Cianorte	2018 Campeonato Paranaense 6th place
Pernambuco	Central	Caruaru	2018 Campeonato Pernambucano runners-up
Pernambuco	Vitória das Tabocas	Vitória de Santo Antão	2018 Campeonato Pernambucano 5th place
Pernambuco	América-PE	Recife	2018 Campeonato Pernambucano 7th place
Pernambuco	Salgueiro	Salgueiro	2018 Série C Group A 10th place
Piauí	Altos	Altos	2018 Campeonato Piauiense champions
Piauí	River	Teresina	2018 Campeonato Piauiense runners-up
(Rio de Janeiro (state)) Rio de Janeiro	Boavista	Saquarema	2018 Campeonato Carioca 5th place
(Rio de Janeiro (state)) Rio de Janeiro	Portuguesa-RJ	Rio de Janeiro	2018 Campeonato Carioca 6th place
(Rio de Janeiro (state)) Rio de Janeiro	Itaboraí	Itaboraí	2018 Copa Rio runners-up
Rio Grande do Norte	América de Natal	Natal	2018 Campeonato Potiguar runners-up
Rio Grande do Norte	Santa Cruz de Natal	Natal	2018 Campeonato Potiguar 3rd place
Rio Grande do Sul	Avenida	Santa Cruz do Sul	2018 Campeonato Gaúcho 4th place
Rio Grande do Sul	Caxias	Caxias do Sul	2018 Campeonato Gaúcho 5th place
Rio Grande do Sul	Gaúcho	Passo Fundo	2018 Copa FGF runners-up
Rondônia	Real Ariquemes	Ariquemes	2018 Campeonato Rondoniense champions
Rondônia	Barcelona	Vilhena	2018 Campeonato Rondoniense runners-up
Roraima	São Raimundo-RR	Boa Vista	2018 Campeonato Roraimense champions
Roraima	Atlético Roraima	Boa Vista	2018 Campeonato Roraimense runners up
(Santa Catarina (state)) Santa Catarina	Tubarão	Tubarão	2018 Campeonato Catarinense 3rd place
(Santa Catarina (state)) Santa Catarina	Brusque	Brusque	2018 Campeonato Catarinense 7th place
(Santa Catarina (state)) Santa Catarina	Hercílio Luz	Tubarão	2018 Campeonato Catarinense 8th place
(Santa Catarina (state)) Santa Catarina	Joinville	Joinville	2018 Série C Group B 10th place
(São Paulo (state)) São Paulo	Novorizontino	Novo Horizonte	2018 Campeonato Paulista 5th place
(São Paulo (state)) São Paulo	São Caetano	São Caetano do Sul	2018 Campeonato Paulista 7th place
(São Paulo (state)) São Paulo	Ituano	Itu	2018 Campeonato Paulista 12th place
(São Paulo (state)) São Paulo	Ferroviária	Araraquara	2018 Copa Paulista runners-up
Sergipe	Sergipe	Aracaju	2018 Campeonato Sergipano champions
Sergipe	Itabaiana	Itabaiana	2018 Campeonato Sergipano runners-up
Tocantins	Palmas	Palmas	2018 Campeonato Tocantinense champions
Tocantins	Interporto^{[b]}	Porto Nacional	2018 Campeonato Tocantinense 3rd place

^{a} Uniclinic Atlético Clube was renamed as Futebol Clube Atlético Cearense on 21 September 2018.
^{b} Gurupi, 2018 Campeonato Tocantinense runners-up, declined to participate in the Série D on 5 April 2019. They were replaced by Interporto on 12 April 2019.

== Competition format ==
In the first stage, 68 teams were divided into seventeen groups of four, organized regionally. 32 teams (17 winners and 15 runners-up) qualified for the second stage. From the second stage on the competition was played as a knock-out tournament with each round contested over two legs.

== First stage ==
In the first stage, each group played on a home-and-away round-robin basis. The winners of each group and the best 15 runners-up qualified for the second stage. The teams were ranked according to points (3 points for a win, 1 point for a draw, and 0 points for a loss). If tied on points, the following criteria would be used to determine the ranking: 1. Wins; 2. Goal difference; 3. Goals scored; 4. Head-to-head (if the tie was only between two teams); 5. Fewest red cards; 6. Fewest yellow cards; 7. Draw in the headquarters of the Brazilian Football Confederation (Regulations Article 12).

Key to colours in group tables
Group winners advance to the Second stage
Best group runners-up advance to the Second stage

=== Group A1 ===
Pos	Team	Pld	W	D	L	GF	GA	GD	Pts
1	(Roraima) São Raimundo-RR	6	4	0	2	15	6	+9	12
2	(Amazonas (Brazilian state)) Fast Clube	6	2	3	1	9	5	+4	9
3	(Rondônia) Barcelona	6	2	2	2	7	10	−3	8
4	(Acre (state)) Rio Branco	6	1	1	4	6	16	−10	4

=== Group A2 ===
Pos	Team	Pld	W	D	L	GF	GA	GD	Pts
1	(Amazonas (Brazilian state)) Manaus	6	4	2	0	16	7	+9	14
2	(Rondônia) Real Ariquemes	6	3	2	1	9	9	0	11
3	(Acre (state)) Galvez	6	1	3	2	10	12	−2	6
4	(Amapá) Santos	6	0	1	5	3	10	−7	1

=== Group A3 ===
Pos	Team	Pld	W	D	L	GF	GA	GD	Pts
1	(Maranhão) Moto Club	6	4	2	0	16	4	+12	14
2	(Pará) São Raimundo-PA	6	4	1	1	12	7	+5	13
3	(Amapá) Ypiranga	6	1	2	3	8	13	−5	5
4	Atlético Roraima	6	0	1	5	3	15	−12	1

=== Group A4 ===
Pos	Team	Pld	W	D	L	GF	GA	GD	Pts
1	(Pará) Bragantino	6	3	0	3	8	7	+1	9
2	(Ceará) Floresta	6	2	3	1	11	7	+4	9
3	(Piauí) River	6	2	3	1	10	7	+3	9
4	(Rio Grande do Norte) Santa Cruz de Natal	6	1	2	3	6	14	−8	5

=== Group A5 ===
Pos	Team	Pld	W	D	L	GF	GA	GD	Pts
1	(Ceará) Atlético Cearense	6	5	0	1	12	6	+6	15
2	(Pernambuco) Central	6	3	0	3	10	7	+3	9
3	(Piauí) Altos	6	3	0	3	7	10	−3	9
4	Maranhão	6	1	0	5	10	16	−6	3

=== Group A6 ===
Pos	Team	Pld	W	D	L	GF	GA	GD	Pts
1	(Rio Grande do Norte) América de Natal	6	4	2	0	20	1	+19	14
2	(Pernambuco) América-PE	6	3	1	2	8	8	0	10
3	Bahia de Feira^{[1]}	6	3	1	2	12	5	+7	7
4	(Paraíba) Serrano	6	0	0	6	2	28	−26	0

^{1} Bahia de Feira were deducted three points for fielding the ineligible player Edimar.

=== Group A7 ===
Pos	Team	Pld	W	D	L	GF	GA	GD	Pts
1	(Bahia) Jacuipense	6	5	0	1	11	2	+9	15
2	(Alagoas) ASA	6	4	1	1	8	5	+3	13
3	(Paraíba) Campinense	6	2	1	3	6	5	+1	7
4	(Pernambuco) Vitória das Tabocas	6	0	0	6	3	16	−13	0

=== Group A8 ===
Pos	Team	Pld	W	D	L	GF	GA	GD	Pts
1	(Bahia) Fluminense de Feira	6	3	3	0	8	4	+4	12
2	(Pernambuco) Salgueiro	6	2	4	0	8	6	+2	10
3	Sergipe	6	1	2	3	11	10	+1	5
4	(Alagoas) Coruripe	6	1	1	4	2	9	−7	4

=== Group A9 ===
Pos	Team	Pld	W	D	L	GF	GA	GD	Pts
1	(Sergipe) Itabaiana	6	4	1	1	9	5	+4	13
2	(Bahia) Juazeirense	6	3	2	1	8	4	+4	11
3	(Goiás) Aparecidense	6	3	0	3	8	5	+3	9
4	(Tocantins) Interporto	6	0	1	5	2	13	−11	1

=== Group A10 ===
Pos	Team	Pld	W	D	L	GF	GA	GD	Pts
1	(Goiás) Iporá	6	3	1	2	7	5	+2	10
2	(Mato Grosso) Sinop	6	2	3	1	7	8	−1	9
3	(Mato Grosso do Sul) Corumbaense	6	2	1	3	9	9	0	7
4	(Tocantins) Palmas	6	1	3	2	5	6	−1	6

=== Group A11 ===
Pos	Team	Pld	W	D	L	GF	GA	GD	Pts
1	(Minas Gerais) Patrocinense	6	3	1	2	9	7	+2	10
2	(Mato Grosso) União Rondonópolis	6	3	1	2	10	9	+1	10
3	(Goiás) Anapolina	6	2	2	2	6	6	0	8
4	(Mato Grosso do Sul) Operário	6	1	2	3	6	9	−3	5

=== Group A12 ===
Pos	Team	Pld	W	D	L	GF	GA	GD	Pts
1	(Minas Gerais) Caldense	6	5	1	0	7	1	+6	16
2	(Espírito Santo) Vitória-ES	6	3	2	1	7	4	+3	11
3	(Rio de Janeiro (state)) Portuguesa-RJ	6	2	1	3	5	6	−1	7
4	(Federal District (Brazil)) Sobradinho	6	0	0	6	1	9	−8	0

=== Group A13 ===
Pos	Team	Pld	W	D	L	GF	GA	GD	Pts
1	(Federal District (Brazil)) Brasiliense	6	3	3	0	5	2	+3	12
2	(São Paulo (state)) Ituano	6	3	2	1	11	3	+8	11
3	(Minas Gerais) URT	6	1	3	2	2	3	−1	6
4	(Espírito Santo) Serra	6	0	2	4	1	11	−10	2

=== Group A14 ===
Pos	Team	Pld	W	D	L	GF	GA	GD	Pts
1	(São Paulo (state)) Novorizontino	6	4	2	0	13	3	+10	14
2	(Santa Catarina (state)) Hercílio Luz	6	3	0	3	5	6	−1	9
3	(Rio de Janeiro (state)) Itaboraí	6	1	2	3	6	10	−4	5
4	(Minas Gerais) Tupi	6	1	2	3	5	10	−5	5

=== Group A15 ===
Pos	Team	Pld	W	D	L	GF	GA	GD	Pts
1	(Santa Catarina (state)) Brusque	6	5	0	1	15	6	+9	15
2	(Rio de Janeiro (state)) Boavista	6	5	0	1	9	5	+4	15
3	(Rio Grande do Sul) Gaúcho	6	1	0	5	5	8	−3	3
4	(Paraná (state)) Foz do Iguaçu	6	1	0	5	3	13	−10	3

=== Group A16 ===
Pos	Team	Pld	W	D	L	GF	GA	GD	Pts
1	(Paraná (state)) Cianorte	6	4	1	1	5	3	+2	13
2	(Rio Grande do Sul) Caxias	6	3	2	1	8	4	+4	11
3	(São Paulo (state)) São Caetano	6	1	2	3	7	7	0	5
4	(Santa Catarina (state)) Tubarão	6	1	1	4	7	13	−6	4

=== Group A17 ===
Pos	Team	Pld	W	D	L	GF	GA	GD	Pts
1	(Rio Grande do Sul) Avenida	6	3	1	2	6	5	+1	10
2	(São Paulo (state)) Ferroviária	6	3	0	3	4	3	+1	9
3	(Paraná (state)) Maringá	6	2	2	2	4	5	−1	8
4	(Santa Catarina (state)) Joinville	6	2	1	3	3	4	−1	7

== Second stage ==
The Second stage was a two-legged knockout tie, with the draw regionalised.

=== Qualification and draw ===
The 32 qualifiers (17 group winners and 15 best performing group runners-up) were divided into two pots. Pot 1 contained the 16 best performing group winners. Pot 2 contained the worst performing group winner and the 15 qualifying group runners-up. In pot 1 the teams were numbered 1 to 16 in numerical order of the group they qualified from. In pot 2 the teams were numbered 17 to 32 in numerical order of the group they qualified from. In the case that one of the qualifying runners-up was from the same group as the worst performing group winner, both teams would be in pot 2 and the group winners would be numbered lower in sequence than the group runners-up.

The teams were ranked according to points. If tied on points, the following criteria would be used to determine the ranking: 1. Wins; 2. Goal difference; 3. Goals scored; 4. Draw in the headquarters of the Brazilian Football Confederation (Regulations Article 14).

To keep the draw regionalised Team 1 played Team 18, Team 2 played Team 17 and this pattern was repeated throughout the draw. The higher numbered team played at home in the first leg.

==== Ranking of group winners ====
Rank	Team	Pts	W	GD	GF	Pot
1	(Minas Gerais) Caldense	16	5	+6	7	Pot 1
2	(Santa Catarina (state)) Brusque	15	5	+9	15	Pot 1
3	(Bahia) Jacuipense	15	5	+9	11	Pot 1
4	(Ceará) Atlético Cearense	15	5	+6	12	Pot 1
5	(Rio Grande do Norte) América de Natal	14	4	+19	20	Pot 1
6	(Maranhão) Moto Club	14	4	+12	16	Pot 1
7	(São Paulo (state)) Novorizontino	14	4	+10	13	Pot 1
8	(Amazonas (Brazilian state)) Manaus	14	4	+9	16	Pot 1
9	(Sergipe) Itabaiana	13	4	+4	9	Pot 1
10	(Paraná (state)) Cianorte	13	4	+2	5	Pot 1
11	(Roraima) São Raimundo-RR	12	4	+9	15	Pot 1
12	(Bahia) Fluminense de Feira	12	3	+4	8	Pot 1
13	(Federal District (Brazil)) Brasiliense	12	3	+3	5	Pot 1
14	(Minas Gerais) Patrocinense	10	3	+2	9	Pot 1
15	(Goiás) Iporá	10	3	+2	7	Pot 1
16	(Rio Grande do Sul) Avenida	10	3	+1	6	Pot 1
17	(Pará) Bragantino	9	3	+1	8	Pot 2

==== Ranking of group runners-up ====
Rank	Team	Pts	W	GD	GF	Pot
1	(Rio de Janeiro (state)) Boavista	15	5	+4	9	Pot 2
2	(Pará) São Raimundo-PA	13	4	+5	12	Pot 2
3	(Alagoas) ASA	13	4	+3	8	Pot 2
4	(São Paulo (state)) Ituano	11	3	+8	11	Pot 2
5	(Rio Grande do Sul) Caxias	11	3	+4	8	Pot 2
6	(Bahia) Juazeirense	11	3	+4	8	Pot 2
7	(Espírito Santo) Vitória-ES	11	3	+3	7	Pot 2
8	(Rondônia) Real Ariquemes	11	3	0	9	Pot 2
9	(Mato Grosso) União Rondonópolis	10	3	+1	10	Pot 2
10	(Pernambuco) América-PE	10	3	0	8	Pot 2
11	(Pernambuco) Salgueiro	10	2	+2	8	Pot 2
12	(Pernambuco) Central	9	3	+3	10	Pot 2
13	(São Paulo (state)) Ferroviária	9	3	+1	4	Pot 2
14	(Santa Catarina (state)) Hercílio Luz	9	3	−1	5	Pot 2
15	(Ceará) Floresta	9	2	+4	11	Pot 2
16	(Amazonas (Brazilian state)) Fast Clube	9	2	+4	9	Eliminated
17	(Mato Grosso) Sinop	9	2	−1	7	Eliminated

==== Qualification pots ====
Pot 1
#	Group	Team
1	A1	(Roraima) São Raimundo-RR
2	A2	(Amazonas (Brazilian state)) Manaus
3	A3	(Maranhão) Moto Club
4	A5	(Ceará) Atlético Cearense
5	A6	(Rio Grande do Norte) América de Natal
6	A7	(Bahia) Jacuipense
7	A8	(Bahia) Fluminense de Feira
8	A9	(Sergipe) Itabaiana
9	A10	(Goiás) Iporá
10	A11	(Minas Gerais) Patrocinense
11	A12	(Minas Gerais) Caldense
12	A13	(Federal District (Brazil)) Brasiliense
13	A14	(São Paulo (state)) Novorizontino
14	A15	(Santa Catarina (state)) Brusque
15	A16	(Paraná (state)) Cianorte
16	A17	(Rio Grande do Sul) Avenida

Pot 2
#	Group	Team
17	A2	(Rondônia) Real Ariquemes
18	A3	(Pará) São Raimundo-PA
19	A4	(Pará) Bragantino
20	A4	(Ceará) Floresta
21	A5	(Pernambuco) Central
22	A6	(Pernambuco) América-PE
23	A7	(Alagoas) ASA
24	A8	(Pernambuco) Salgueiro
25	A9	(Bahia) Juazeirense
26	A11	(Mato Grosso) União Rondonópolis
27	A12	(Espírito Santo) Vitória-ES
28	A13	(São Paulo (state)) Ituano
29	A14	(Santa Catarina (state)) Hercílio Luz
30	A15	(Rio de Janeiro (state)) Boavista
31	A16	(Rio Grande do Sul) Caxias
32	A17	(São Paulo (state)) Ferroviária

==== Ties ====
The matches were played from 15 to 23 June.

Team 1	Agg.	Team 2	1st leg	2nd leg
São Raimundo-PA (Pará)	2–1	(Roraima) São Raimundo-RR	1–0	1–1
Real Ariquemes (Rondônia)	2–6	(Amazonas (Brazilian state)) Manaus	1–2	1–4
Floresta (Ceará)	5–3	(Maranhão) Moto Club	3–3	2–0
Bragantino (Pará)	4–2	(Ceará) Atlético Cearense	3–0	1–2
América-PE (Pernambuco)	1–2	(Rio Grande do Norte) América de Natal	1–0	0–2
Central (Pernambuco)	3–3 (3–5 p)	(Bahia) Jacuipense	2–0	1–3
Salgueiro (Pernambuco)	1–2	(Bahia) Fluminense de Feira	1–1	0–1
ASA (Alagoas)	3–4	(Sergipe) Itabaiana	2–0	1–4
União Rondonópolis (Mato Grosso)	2–5	(Goiás) Iporá	2–3	0–2
Juazeirense (Bahia)	1–1 (5–4 p)	(Minas Gerais) Patrocinense	1–0	0–1
Ituano (São Paulo (state))	4–1	(Minas Gerais) Caldense	2–1	2–0
Vitória-ES (Espírito Santo)	2–1	(Federal District (Brazil)) Brasiliense	0–0	2–1
Boavista (Rio de Janeiro (state))	1–1 (4–2 p)	(São Paulo (state)) Novorizontino	0–1	1–0
Hercílio Luz (Santa Catarina (state))	0–2	(Santa Catarina (state)) Brusque	0–0	0–2
Ferroviária (São Paulo (state))	0–0 (3–4 p)	(Paraná (state)) Cianorte	0–0	0–0
Caxias (Rio Grande do Sul)	0–0 (6–5 p)	(Rio Grande do Sul) Avenida	0–0	0–0

== Third stage ==
The third stage was a two-legged knockout tie, with the draw regionalised. The ties were predetermined from the second stage, with the winners of second stage tie 1 playing the winners of second stage tie 2, etc. The teams were seeded according to their performance in the tournament with the higher-seeded team hosting the second leg.

=== Ties ===
The matches were played from 30 June to 8 July.

Team 1	Agg.	Team 2	1st leg	2nd leg
São Raimundo-PA (Pará)	1–1 (3–4 p)	(Amazonas (Brazilian state)) Manaus	1–0	0–1
Bragantino (Pará)	1–3	(Ceará) Floresta	0–0	1–3
América de Natal (Rio Grande do Norte)	0–1	(Bahia) Jacuipense	0–0	0–1
Fluminense de Feira (Bahia)	0–3	(Sergipe) Itabaiana	0–1	0–2
Juazeirense (Bahia)	1–1 (4–3 p)	(Goiás) Iporá	1–1	0–0
Vitória-ES (Espírito Santo)	1–2	(São Paulo (state)) Ituano	0–0	1–2
Boavista (Rio de Janeiro (state))	1–4	(Santa Catarina (state)) Brusque	1–1	0–3
Caxias (Rio Grande do Sul)	2–1	(Paraná (state)) Cianorte	0–0	2–1

== Final stages ==
The final stages were a two leg knockout competition with quarter-finals, semi-finals and finals rounds. The draw for the quarter-finals was seeded based on the table of results of all matches in the competition for the qualifying teams. First played eighth, second played seventh, etc. The top four seeded teams played the second leg at home. The four quarter-final winners were promoted to Série C for 2020.

The draw for the semi-finals was seeded based on the table of results of all matches in the competition for the qualifying teams. First played fourth, second played third. The top two seeded teams played the second leg at home.

In the finals, the team with the best record in the competition played the second leg at home.

=== Quarter-finals seedings ===
Seed	Team	Pts	W	GD	GF
1	(Santa Catarina (state)) Brusque	23	7	+14	21
2	(Amazonas (Brazilian state)) Manaus	23	7	+13	23
3	(Bahia) Jacuipense	22	7	+10	15
4	(Sergipe) Itabaiana	22	7	+8	16
5	(São Paulo (state)) Ituano	21	6	+12	17
6	(Ceará) Floresta	17	4	+8	19
7	(Rio Grande do Sul) Caxias	17	4	+5	10
8	(Bahia) Juazeirense	16	4	+4	10

=== Quarter-finals ties ===
The matches were played from 13 to 21 July.

Team 1	Agg.	Team 2	1st leg	2nd leg
Juazeirense (Bahia)	1–4	(Santa Catarina (state)) Brusque	1–0	0–4
Caxias (Rio Grande do Sul)	1–3	(Amazonas (Brazilian state)) Manaus	1–0	0–3
Floresta (Ceará)	2–3	(Bahia) Jacuipense	2–2	0–1
Ituano (São Paulo (state))	3–2	(Sergipe) Itabaiana	3–1	0–1

=== Semi-finals seedings ===
Seed	Team	Pts	W	GD	GF
1	(Santa Catarina (state)) Brusque	26	8	+17	25
2	(Amazonas (Brazilian state)) Manaus	26	8	+15	26
3	(Bahia) Jacuipense	26	8	+11	18
4	(São Paulo (state)) Ituano	24	7	+13	20

=== Semi-finals ties ===
The matches were played from 28 July to 4 August.

Team 1	Agg.	Team 2	1st leg	2nd leg
Ituano (São Paulo (state))	2–2 (3–4 p)	(Santa Catarina (state)) Brusque	2–0	0–2
Jacuipense (Bahia)	1–2	(Amazonas (Brazilian state)) Manaus	1–1	0–1

=== Finals seedings ===
Seed	Team	Pts	W	GD	GF
1	(Amazonas (Brazilian state)) Manaus	30	9	+16	28
2	(Santa Catarina (state)) Brusque	29	9	+17	27

=== Finals ===
The matches were played on 11 and 18 August.

Team 1	Agg.	Team 2	1st leg	2nd leg
Brusque (Santa Catarina (state))	4–4 (6–5 p)	(Amazonas (Brazilian state)) Manaus	2–2	2–2

11 August 2019
16:00 UTC−3

Brusque (Santa Catarina (state))	2–2	(Amazonas (Brazilian state)) Manaus
Júnior Pirambu 48'; Zé Mateus 54'	Report	Rossini 62', 81'

Estádio Augusto Bauer, Brusque
Attendance: 4,487
Referee: Wagner Reway (Paraíba)

18 August 2019
16:00 UTC−3

Manaus (Amazonas (Brazilian state))	2–2	(Santa Catarina (state)) Brusque
Sávio 8'; Mateus Oliveira 59'	Report	Júnior Pirambu 2'; Thiago Alagoano 82'
Penalties
Derlan (penalty scored); Charles (penalty scored); Martony (penalty scored); Thiago Spice (penalty scored); Mateus Oliveira (penalty scored); Márcio Passos (penalty missed)	5–6	(penalty scored) Thiago Alagoano; (penalty scored) Airton; (penalty scored) Thiago Henrique; (penalty scored) Gama; (penalty scored) Vinícius; (penalty scored) Zé Carlos

Arena da Amazônia, Manaus
Attendance: 44,896
Referee: Edina Alves Batista (São Paulo)

== Top goalscorers ==
Rank	Player	Team	Goals
1	Júnior Pirambu	(Santa Catarina (state)) Brusque	10
2	Gui Mendes	(São Paulo (state)) Ituano	8
2	Hamilton	(Amazonas (Brazilian state)) Manaus	8
2	Mateus Oliveira	(Amazonas (Brazilian state)) Manaus	8
2	Thiago Alagoano	(Santa Catarina (state)) Brusque	8
6	Paulo Vyctor	(Ceará) Floresta	7
7	Wallace Lima	(Maranhão) Moto Club	6
8	Ebinho	Bahia de Feira	5
8	Joélson	(Pernambuco) Central	5
8	Luiz Paulo	(Sergipe) Itabaiana	5
8	Max	(Rio Grande do Norte) América de Natal	5
8	Thauan	(Alagoas) ASA	5

Source: CBF
