= Júnior Pirambu =

Brazilian footballer (born 1994)

Personal information
- Full name: Aldevan Santos Nascimento Júnior
- Date of birth: 3 August 1994 (age 32)
- Place of birth: Aracaju, Brazil
- Height: 1.83 m (6 ft 0 in)
- Position: Forward

Team information
- Current team: Sergipe

Youth career
- –2013: Sergipe

Senior career*
Years	Team	Apps	(Gls)
2013–2015	Sergipe	11	(2)
2016	Lagarto	10	(6)
2017	Maranhão	8	(3)
2018	Olímpico	7	(4)
2019	Metropolitano	12	(6)
2019	Brusque	16	(10)
2019–2020	Londrina	33	(6)
2020–2021	Brusque	12	(6)
2021	Londrina	22	(1)
2022	Portuguesa-RJ	11	(1)
2022	Brasil de Pelotas	14	(1)
2023	Camboriú	9	(1)
2023	Campinense	12	(1)
2024	Central	8	(3)
2025–	Sergipe	5	(0)
- * Club domestic league appearances and goals as of 28 August 2025

Aldevan Santos Nascimento Júnior (born 3 August 1994), better known as Júnior Pirambu, is a Brazilian professional footballer who plays as a forward.

== Career ==
Born in Aracaju, he started his career at CS Sergipe. He played for several other teams in Brazil, most notably Brusque, where he was champion of the 2019 Série D, and Londrina EC, where he was state champion in 2021.

Pirambu was announced by Camboriú as a reinforcement for the 2023 season. In May, the player transferred to Campinense.

After playing for Central in 2024 season, Pirambu transferred to Sergipe.

== Honours ==
Sergipe

- Campeonato Sergipano: 2013

Brusque

- Campeonato Brasileiro Série D: 2019

Londrina

- Campeonato Paranaense: 2021

Individual

- 2019 Campeonato Brasileiro Série D top scorer: 10 goals
