= Campeonato Brasileiro Série D =

Football league in Brazil

- Founded: 2009
- Country: Brazil
- Confederation: CONMEBOL
- Number of clubs: 64 (96 from 2026)
- Level on pyramid: 4
- Promotion to: Série C
- Current champions: Uberlândia (1st title) (2026)
- Most championships: Ferroviário (2 titles)
- Broadcaster(s): BandSports; TV Brasil
- Website: Official website
- Current: 2026 Campeonato Brasileiro Série D

The Campeonato Brasileiro Série D (English: Brazilian Championship Serie D), commonly known as the Série D or the Brazilian Série D to distinguish it from the Italian Serie D, is the fourth division of the Brazilian football league system, and was announced by the Brazilian Football Confederation (CBF) on 9 April 2008. The Campeonato Brasileiro Série D was formed from the split of the Série C, keeping its best 20 clubs and playing double round robin as does the top three divisions. The Série D keeps the same format of the older Série C, but with participation limited to 40 clubs recognized by the state federation. In 2016 the Série D was expanded to 68 clubs, but in 2022 it was reduced to 64 clubs.

The Série D format is a mixed system: the 64 clubs are divided in 8 groups organized regionally, playing in a round-robin format. The top teams qualify for playoffs and clubs that reach the semi-finals are promoted to Série C. Clubs qualify for the Série D by their performance at state championships — spots are given to the top clubs on those leagues that are not at Série A, B or C — at state cups or relegation from Série C.

== List of champions ==
The following table shows the winners and runners-up of the Série D tournaments played since its beginning in 2009, according to the Brazilian Football Confederation:

Ed.	Season	Champion	Runner-up
1	2009	(Pará) São Raimundo	(Rio de Janeiro (state)) Macaé
2	2010	(Ceará) Guarany de Sobral	(Rio de Janeiro (state)) Madureira
3	2011	(Minas Gerais) Tupi	(Pernambuco) Santa Cruz
4	2012	(Maranhão) Sampaio Corrêa	(Goiás) CRAC
5	2013	(Paraíba) Botafogo	(Rio Grande do Sul) Juventude
6	2014	(Minas Gerais) Tombense	(Rio Grande do Sul) Brasil de Pelotas
7	2015	(São Paulo (state)) Botafogo	(Piauí) Ríver
8	2016	(Rio de Janeiro (state)) Volta Redonda	(Alagoas) CSA
9	2017	(Paraná (state)) Operário Ferroviário	(Rio Grande do Norte) Globo
10	2018	(Ceará) Ferroviário	(Paraíba) Treze
11	2019	(Santa Catarina (state)) Brusque	(Amazonas (Brazilian state)) Manaus
12	2020	(São Paulo (state)) Mirassol	(Ceará) Floresta
13	2021	(Goiás) Aparecidense	(Paraíba) Campinense
14	2022	(Rio Grande do Norte) América de Natal	(Minas Gerais) Pouso Alegre
15	2023	(Ceará) Ferroviário	(São Paulo (state)) Ferroviária
16	2024	(Pernambuco) Retrô	(Goiás) Anápolis
17	2025	(Santa Catarina (state)) Barra	(Pernambuco) Santa Cruz
18	2026	(Minas Gerais) Uberlândia	(Alagoas) ASA

== Performances ==
=== By club ===
Performance in the Campeonato Brasileiro Série D by club
Club	Won	Runners-up	Years won	Years runners-up
(Ceará) Ferroviário	2	0	2018, 2023	—
(Rio Grande do Norte) América-RN	1	0	2022	—
(Goiás) Aparecidense	1	0	2021	—
(Santa Catarina (state)) Barra-SC	1	0	2025	—
(Paraíba) Botafogo-PB	1	0	2013	—
(São Paulo (state)) Botafogo-SP	1	0	2015	—
(Santa Catarina (state)) Brusque	1	0	2019	—
(Ceará) Guarany de Sobral	1	0	2010	—
(São Paulo (state)) Mirassol	1	0	2020	—
(Paraná (state)) Operário Ferroviário	1	0	2017	—
(Pernambuco) Retrô	1	0	2024	—
(Maranhão) Sampaio Corrêa	1	0	2012	—
(Pará) São Raimundo	1	0	2009	—
(Minas Gerais) Tombense	1	0	2014	—
(Minas Gerais) Tupi	1	0	2011	—
(Minas Gerais) Uberlândia	1	0	2026	—
(Rio de Janeiro (state)) Volta Redonda	1	0	2016	—
(Pernambuco) Santa Cruz	0	2	—	2011, 2025
(Goiás) Anápolis	0	1	—	2024
(Alagoas) ASA	0	1	—	2026
(Rio Grande do Sul) Brasil de Pelotas	0	1	—	2014
(Paraíba) Campinense	0	1	—	2021
(Goiás) CRAC	0	1	—	2012
(Alagoas) CSA	0	1	—	2016
(São Paulo (state)) Ferroviária	0	1	—	2023
(Ceará) Floresta	0	1	—	2020
(Rio Grande do Norte) Globo	0	1	—	2017
(Rio Grande do Sul) Juventude	0	1	—	2013
(Rio de Janeiro (state)) Macaé	0	1	—	2009
(Rio de Janeiro (state)) Madureira	0	1	—	2010
(Amazonas (Brazilian state)) Manaus	0	1	—	2019
(Minas Gerais) Pouso Alegre	0	1	—	2022
(Piauí) Ríver	0	1	—	2015
(Paraíba) Treze	0	1	—	2018

=== By state ===
Performance by state
State	Winners	Runners-up
Ceará	3	1
Minas Gerais	3	1
São Paulo	2	1
Santa Catarina	2	0
Goiás	1	2
Paraíba	1	2
Pernambuco	1	2
Rio de Janeiro	1	2
Rio Grande do Norte	1	1
Maranhão	1	0
Pará	1	0
Paraná	1	0
Alagoas	0	2
Rio Grande do Sul	0	2
Amazonas	0	1
Piauí	0	1

== Participations ==
=== Most appearances ===
As of 2025 season

Below is the list of clubs that have more appearances in the Campeonato Brasileiro Série D.

Club	App	First	Last
Central	12	2009	2025
Sergipe	11	2009	2025
Aparecidense	10	2012	2025
Campinense	10	2012	2023
Moto Club	9	2009	2024
Rio Branco (AC)	9	2014	2024
São Raimundo (RR)	9	2014	2024

=== Clubs promoted from Série D ===
Year	Clubs
2009	São Raimundo (PA), Macaé, Chapecoense, Alecrim
2010	Guarany de Sobral, Madureira, Araguaína, Joinville
2011	Tupi, Santa Cruz, Cuiabá, Oeste, Treze
2012	Sampaio Corrêa, CRAC, Baraúnas, Mogi Mirim
2013	Botafogo (PB), Juventude, Tupi, Salgueiro
2014	Tombense, Brasil de Pelotas, Londrina, Confiança
2015	Botafogo (SP), Ríver, Remo, Ypiranga
2016	Volta Redonda, CSA, São Bento, Moto Club
2017	Operário Ferroviário, Globo, Atlético Acreano, Juazeirense
2018	Ferrovário, Treze, São José (RS), Imperatriz
2019	Brusque, Manaus, Ituano, Jacuipense
2020	Mirassol, Floresta, Novorizontino, Altos
2021	Aparecidense, Campinense, ABC, Atlético Cearense
2022	América de Natal, Pouso Alegre, Amazonas, São Bernardo FC
2023	Ferrovário, Ferroviária, Athletic, Caxias
2024	Retrô, Anápolis, Itabaiana, Maringá
2025	Barra (SC), Santa Cruz, Inter de Limeira, Maranhão
2026	Uberlândia, ASA, Gama, ABC, Goiatuba, Nacional (AM)

1. Treze managed to promote to Série C in the sports court.

== Top scorers ==
Year	Player (team)	Goals
2009	Michell (São Raimundo-PA)	10
2010	Danilo Pitbull (Guarany de Sobral)	11
2011	Fernando (Cuiabá); Marcinho Beija-Flor (Oeste)	11
2012	Nino Guerreiro (CRAC)	13
2013	Ademilson (Tupi)	12
2014	Nena (Brasil de Pelotas)	8
2015	Jô (São Caetano)	12
2016	Manoel (Altos)	10
2017	Eduardo (Atlético Acreano); Weverton (Princesa do Solimões)	9
2018	Edson Cariús (Ferroviário-CE)	11
2019	Júnior Pirambu (Brusque)	10
2020	Wallace Pernambucano (América-RN); Zé Eduardo (Brasiliense)	12
2021	Gabriel Santos (Caldense)	13
2022	Ítalo (Amazonas); Rafael (Amazonas)	11
2023	Eron (Caxias)	14
2024	Thiaguinho (Treze)	10
2025	Ronaldy (Tuna Luso)	10
2026	Felipe Clemente (Gama); Rian Santana (CSA)	11

== Winning managers ==
Year	Manager	Club
2009	Lúcio Matos	São Raimundo (PA)
2010	Oliveira Canindé	Guarany de Sobral
2011	Ricardo Drubscky	Tupi
2012	Flávio Araújo	Sampaio Corrêa
2013	Marcelo Vilar	Botafogo (PB)
2014	Eugênio Souza	Tombense
2015	Marcelo Veiga	Botafogo (SP)
2016	Felipe Surian	Volta Redonda
2017	Gerson Gusmão	Operário Ferroviário
2018	Marcelo Vilar (2)	Ferroviário
2019	Waguinho Dias	Brusque
2020	Eduardo Baptista	Mirassol
2021	Thiago Carvalho	Aparecidense
2022	Leandro Sena	América de Natal
2023	Paulinho Kobayashi	Ferroviário
2024	Itamar Schülle	Retrô
2025	Eduardo Souza	Barra (SC)
2026	Danilo	Uberlândia

== See also ==
- Campeonato Brasileiro Série A, the main division of Brazilian football
- Campeonato Brasileiro Série B, the second division of Brazilian football
- Campeonato Brasileiro Série C, the third division of Brazilian football
- CBF
