= Allan (footballer, born 1994) =

Brazilian footballer

Personal information
- Full name: Allan Christian de Almeida
- Date of birth: 24 February 1994 (age 32)
- Place of birth: São Paulo, Brazil
- Height: 1.85 m (6 ft 1 in)
- Position: Midfielder

Team information
- Current team: União Suzano

Youth career
- –2014: São Paulo

Senior career*
Years	Team	Apps	(Gls)
2014–2017	São Paulo	0	(0)
2014	→ Noroeste (loan)	10	(3)
2015–2016	→ Nacional-SP (loan)	34	(1)
2018	Shukura Kobuleti	0	(0)
2018–2019	Nacional-SP	0	(0)
2019	→ Boa (loan)	5	(0)
2020	Tupynambás	6	(0)
2020	Juventus-SC	4	(1)
2020	Camboriú	9	(0)
2021	Juventus-SC	20	(1)
2022	Juventus-SP	3	(0)
2023–	União Suzano	0	(0)

International career
2011	Brazil U17	1	(0)
- * Club domestic league appearances and goals as of 19:20, 21 October 2020 (UTC)

Allan Christian de Almeida (born 24 February 1994), commonly known as Allan, is a Brazilian footballer who currently plays as a midfielder for União Suzano.

== Career statistics ==
=== Club ===
As of 17 June 2019.

Club	Season	League			State League		Cup		Continental		Other		Total	
Club	Season	Division	Apps	Goals	Apps	Goals	Apps	Goals	Apps	Goals	Apps	Goals	Apps	Goals
São Paulo	2014	Série A	0	0	0	0	0	0	0	0	0	0	0	0
São Paulo	2015	Série A	0	0	0	0	0	0	0	0	0	0	0	0
São Paulo	2016	Série A	0	0	0	0	0	0	0	0	0	0	0	0
São Paulo	2017	Série A	0	0	0	0	0	0	0	0	0	0	0	0
São Paulo	Total		0	0	0	0	0	0	0	0	0	0	0	0
Noroeste (loan)	2014	–			10 (Note: Appearances in the Campeonato Paulista A3)	3	0	0	–		0	0	10	3
Nacional-SP (loan)	2015	–			12	0	0	0	–		0	0	12	0
Nacional-SP (loan)	2016	–			22	1	0	0	–		0	0	22	1
Nacional-SP (loan)	Total		0	0	34	1	0	0	0	0	0	0	34	1
Nacional-SP	2018	–			0	0	0	0	–		3 (Note: Appearances in the Copa Paulista)	0	3	0
Boa	2019	Série C	1	0	4 (Note: Appearances in the Campeonato Mineiro)	0	0	0	–		0	0	5	0
Career total			1	0	48	0	0	0	0	0	3	0	52	0
