= Marcinho Beija-Flor =

Brazilian footballer

Personal information
- Full name: Márcio Antônio Batista
- Date of birth: 11 December 1979 (age 46)
- Place of birth: Florianópolis, Brazil
- Height: 1.73 m (5 ft 8 in)
- Position: Winger

Senior career*
Years	Team	Apps	(Gls)
2003	Guarani de Palhoça		
2004	Avaí		
2005	Figueirense		
2005	Comercial-SP		
2006	Joinville		
2006	Sertãozinho		
2007	Botafogo-SP		
2007	CRB		
2007–2008	Morelia		
2009	CRB		
2009	Sertãozinho		
2010	Noroeste		
2010	Botafogo-SP		
2010–2011	Uberaba		
2011	Rio Verde-MS		
2011–2013	Oeste		
2014	São José-SP		
2014	Sertãozinho		
2014	Oeste		
2015	Comercial-SP		
2016	Sergipe		
- * Club domestic league appearances and goals

Márcio Antônio Batista (born 11 December 1979), better known as Marcinho Beija-Flor, is a Brazilian former professional footballer who played as a winger.

== Career ==
Marcinho played for several clubs in Brazil, with emphasis on his time at Oeste FC, where he was top scorer in 2011 Série D and champion of 2012 Série C. He ended his career at CS Sergipe as state champion.

His nickname "Beija-Flor" (English: hummingbird) was given because the athlete, short in stature, had good impulsion and seemed to stop in the air.

== Honours ==
Oeste

- Campeonato Brasileiro Série C: 2012
- Campeonato Paulista do Interior: 2011

Uberaba

- Taça Minas Gerais: 2010

Sergipe

- Campeonato Sergipano: 2016

Individual

- 2011 Campeonato Brasileiro Série D top scorer: 11 goals
