= Estádio Hercílio Luz =

Football stadium in Itajaí, Santa Catarina, Brazil

- Gigantão das Avenidas
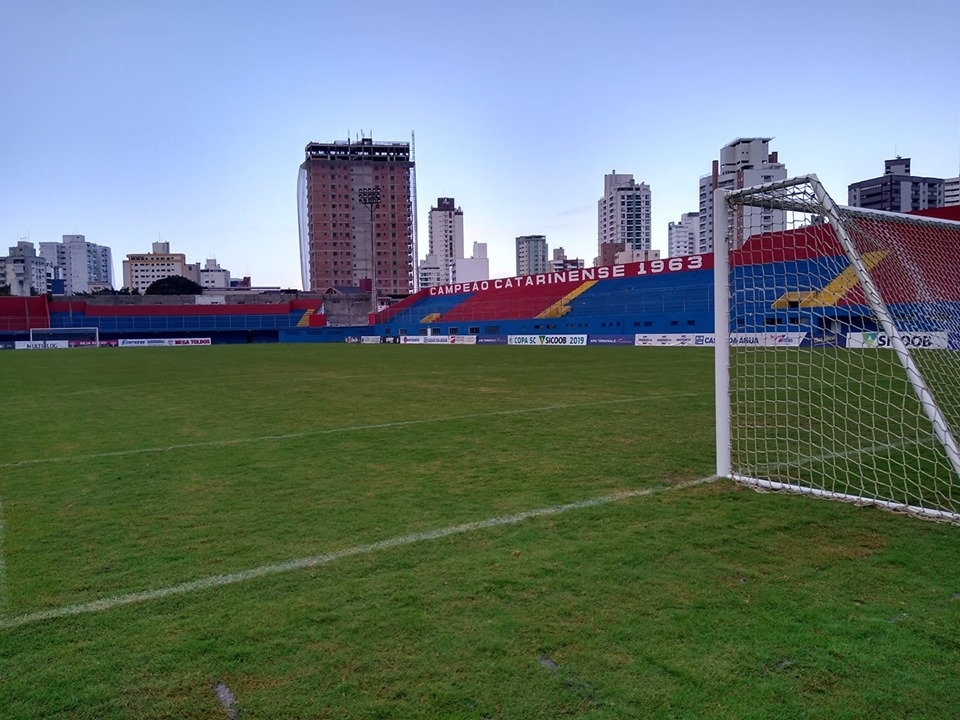
- Interactive map of Estádio Hercílio Luz
- Full name: Estádio Dr. Hercílio Luz
- Location: Itajaí, Santa Catarina, Brazil
- Coordinates: 26.90839611809725°S 48.659854590210244°W
- Owner: Clube Náutico Marcílio Dias
- Capacity: 6.000
- Surface: grass
- Field size: 105 x 68m

Construction
- Opened: October 2, 1921
- Renovated: 2019

Tenant
- Marcílio Dias

Estádio Hercílio Luz is an association football stadium in Itajaí, Santa Catarina, Brazil. The stadium holds 6,000 people. It was inaugurated in 1921. The name of the stadium is in honor of Hercílio Luz, governor at the time the land was given for the construction of the field.
