= Thiago Alagoano =

Brazilian footballer

Personal information
- Full name: Luiz Carlos Marques Lima
- Date of birth: 30 May 1989 (age 37)
- Place of birth: Delmiro Gouveia, Brazil
- Height: 1.71 m (5 ft 7 in)
- Position: Forward

Team information
- Current team: Floresta

Youth career
- 2008: ASA

Senior career*
Years	Team	Apps	(Gls)
2009–2012	ASA	8	(1)
2010	→ Américo (loan)	11	(3)
2012–2014	Horizonte	28	(10)
2013	→ Baraúnas (loan)	9	(2)
2014	→ Jacuipense (loan)	15	(12)
2014	→ Jeju United (loan)	7	(1)
2015	Coruripe	13	(2)
2015	Colo Colo	6	(3)
2016	Cruzeiro-RS	13	(4)
2016	River-PI	7	(0)
2017	Cruzeiro-RS	13	(5)
2017–2018	Joinville	23	(4)
2019	São Luiz	15	(2)
2019–2021	Brusque	125	(50)
2022	Inter de Limeira	9	(1)
2022	Criciúma	32	(2)
2023	Brusque	16	(0)
2023–	Floresta	8	(1)
- * Club domestic league appearances and goals as of 26 August 2023

Luiz Carlos Marques Lima (born 30 May 1989), commonly known as Thiago Alagoano, is a Brazilian professional footballer who plays as a forward for Floresta.

== Club career ==
In August 2014, Alagoano joined South Korean club Jeju United.
