= 2026 Santa Cruz Futebol Clube season =

Santa Cruz
2026 season
- Chairman: Bruno Rodrigues
- Manager: Marcelo Cabo; Claudinei Oliveira; Cristian de Souza
- Stadium: Estádio do Arruda; Arena Pernambuco
- Série C: Second stage (Promoted)
- Pernambucano: Semi-finals
- Copa do Brasil: Second round
| Home colours | Away colours |

The 2026 season was Santa Cruz's 113th season in the club's history. Santa Cruz competed in the Campeonato Pernambucano, Copa do Brasil and Série C.

== Squad ==
As of 4 October 2026

Note: Flags indicate national team as defined under FIFA eligibility rules; some limited exceptions apply. Players may hold more than one non-FIFA nationality.

| No. | Pos. | Nation | Player |
|---|---|---|---|
| 1 | GK | BRA | Thiago Coelho |
| 2 | DF | BRA | Thiago Ennes |
| 3 | DF | BRA | Eurico |
| 4 | DF | BRA | William Alves (captain) |
| 5 | MF | BRA | Pedro Favela |
| 6 | DF | BRA | Alex Ruan |
| 7 | MF | BRA | Fabinho |
| 8 | MF | BRA | Arilson |
| 9 | FW | BRA | Matheus Cadorini (on loan from Portuguesa) |
| 10 | FW | BRA | Cassiano Bouzon |
| 11 | MF | BRA | Matheus Melo |
| 12 | GK | BRA | Rokenedy |
| 13 | DF | BRA | Matheus Vinícius |
| 15 | MF | BRA | Andrey |

| No. | Pos. | Nation | Player |
|---|---|---|---|
| 17 | FW | BRA | Ronald |
| 18 | MF | BRA | Willian Júnior (on loan from Gama-DF) |
| 19 | FW | BRA | Renato |
| 20 | MF | BRA | Patrick Allan |
| 23 | FW | BRA | Tiago Marques |
| 25 | GK | BRA | Gabriel Souza |
| 26 | MF | BRA | Silva |
| 28 | FW | BRA | Eron |
| 29 | FW | BRA | Alex Sandro |
| 31 | DF | BRA | Zé Mário |
| 32 | MF | BRA | João Pedro |
| 37 | FW | BRA | Everaldo |
| 60 | DF | BRA | Rodrigues |

== Friendlies ==
=== Vitoria Cup ===
| 8 January 2026 | Santa Cruz (Brazil) | 0–1 | (Argentina) Defensa y Justicia | Recife |
| 16:00 (UTC-3) | | Report | Fernandez 68' | Stadium: Estádio José do Rego Maciel (Arruda); Attendance: 0 Referee: Paulo Belence |

== Statistics ==
=== Goalscorers ===
| Place | Position | Nationality | Number | Name | Campeonato Pernambucano | Copa do Brasil | Série C | Total |
|---|---|---|---|---|---|---|---|---|
| 1 | FW | (Brazil) | 9 | Diego Quirino | 4 | 0 | 1 | 5 |
| 1 | DF | (Brazil) | 13 | Matheus Vinicius | 2 | 0 | 3 | 5 |
| 1 | MF | (Brazil) | 19 | Renato | 2 | 0 | 3 | 5 |
| 2 | FW | (Brazil) | 28 | Eron | 0 | 0 | 3 | 3 |
| 2 | MF | (Brazil) | 14 | Eurico | 1 | 0 | 2 | 3 |
| 2 | MF | (Brazil) | 15 | Pedro Favela | 0 | 0 | 3 | 3 |
| 3 | FW | (Brazil) | 29 | Marquinhos | 0 | 0 | 2 | 2 |
| 3 | MF | (Brazil) | 20 | Patrick Allan | 2 | 0 | 0 | 2 |
| 3 | MF | (Brazil) | 17 | Ronald | 0 | 0 | 2 | 2 |
| 4 | DF | (Brazil) | 27 | Edson Miranda | 0 | 0 | 1 | 1 |
| 4 | MF | (Brazil) | 37 | Everaldo | 0 | 0 | 1 | 1 |
| 4 | MF | (Brazil) | 7 | Fabinho | 0 | 0 | 1 | 1 |
| 4 | DF | (Brazil) | 2 | Israel | 1 | 0 | 0 | 1 |
| 4 | FW | (Brazil) | 23 | Tiago Marques | 0 | 0 | 1 | 1 |
| 4 | MF | (Brazil) | 18 | Vitinho | 1 | 0 | 0 | 1 |
| 4 | MF | (Brazil) | 10 | Willian Júnior | 1 | 0 | 0 | 1 |
| | | | | Own goals | 1 | 0 | 2 | 3 |
| | | | | Total | 15 | 0 | 25 | 40 |

=== Managers performance ===
| Name | From | To | P | W | D | L | GF | GA | Avg% | Ref |
|---|---|---|---|---|---|---|---|---|---|---|
| (Brazil) Marcelo Cabo | 11 January 2026 | 25 January 2026 | 5 | 2 | 1 | 2 | 5 | 6 | 46% | |
| (Brazil) Fábio Cortez (c) | 28 January 2026 | 22 February 2026 | 6 | 3 | 0 | 3 | 10 | 6 | 50% | |
| (Brazil) Claudinei Oliveira | 5 March 2026 | 2 May 2026 | 6 | 1 | 2 | 3 | 2 | 4 | 27% | |
| (Brazil) Cristian de Souza | 11 May 2026 | 10 October 2026 | 20 | 10 | 6 | 4 | 23 | 14 | 60% | |

(c) Indicates the caretaker manager

=== Overall record ===
| Competition | First match | Last match | Starting round | Final position | Record | | | | | | | |
| Competition | First match | Last match | Starting round | Final position | Pld | W | D | L | GF | GA | GD | Win % |
|---|---|---|---|---|---|---|---|---|---|---|---|---|
| Pernambucano | 11 January | 22 February | First stage | Semi-finals | 11 | 5 | 1 | 5 | 15 | 12 | +3 | 45.45 |
| Copa do Brasil | 5 March | 5 March | Second round | Second round | 1 | 0 | 1 | 0 | 0 | 0 | +0 | 0.00 |
| Série C | 6 April | 10 October | First stage | Second stage | 25 | 11 | 7 | 7 | 25 | 18 | +7 | 44.00 |
| Total | | | | | 37 | 16 | 9 | 12 | 40 | 30 | +10 | 43.24 |

Last updated: 10 October 2026
Source: Competitions

== Competitions ==
=== Campeonato Pernambucano ===
==== First stage ====
| 11 January 2026 1 | Santa Cruz | 3–0 | Decisão | São Lourenço da Mata |
| 18:00 (UTC-3) | Renato 17'; Quirino 20'; Mateus Rodrigues 32' (o.g.) | Report | | Stadium: Estádio Governador Carlos Wilson Campos (Arena Pernambuco); Attendance: 5,263; Referee: Michelangelo Almeida |

| 14 January 2026 2 | Maguary | 1–1 | Santa Cruz | Bonito |
| 15:00 (UTC-3) | Bruno Vinícius 29' | Report | Renato 36' | Stadium: Estádio Municipal Arthur Tavares de Melo; Attendance: 1,154; Referee: Diego Fernando |

| 17 January 2026 3 | Santa Cruz | 1–0 | Vitória das Tabocas | São Lourenço da Mata |
| 17:00 (UTC-3) | Matheus Vinicius 71' | Report | | Stadium: Estádio Governador Carlos Wilson Campos (Arena Pernambuco); Attendance: 6,078; Referee: Hugo Figueiredo |

| 21 January 2026 4 | Retrô | 1–0 | Santa Cruz | São Lourenço da Mata |
| 21:30 (UTC-3) | Bruno Marques 75' | Report | | Stadium: Estádio Governador Carlos Wilson Campos (Arena Pernambuco); Attendance: 1,423; Referee: Paulo Belence |

| 25 January 2026 5 | Santa Cruz | 0–4 | Náutico | São Lourenço da Mata |
| 18:00 (UTC-3) | | Report | Dodô 38'; Vinícius 53', 59'; Junior Todinho 76' | Stadium: Estádio Governador Carlos Wilson Campos (Arena Pernambuco); Attendance: 13,232; Referee: Rodrigo Pereira |

| 28 January 2026 6 | Santa Cruz | 6–0 | Jaguar | Recife |
| 16:00 (UTC-3) | Patrick Allan 1'; Willian Júnior 5'; Diego Quirino 30', 55', 58'; Vitinho 84' | Report | | Stadium: Estádio José do Rego Maciel (Arruda); Attendance: 0 Referee: Hugo Figueiredo |

| 31 January 2026 7 | Sport | 2–1 | Santa Cruz | Recife |
| 16:30 (UTC-3) | Gustavo Coutinho 36' (pen.); Micael 90+1' | Report | Eurico 39' | Stadium: Estádio Adelmar da Costa Carvalho (Ilha do Retiro); Attendance: 20,631; Referee: Paulo Belence |

==== Second stage ====
| 5 February 2026 | Decisão | 1–2 | Santa Cruz | Goiana |
| 16:30 (UTC-3) | Bambam 84' | Report | Israel 12'; Matheus Vinícius 43' | Stadium: Estádio José Dionísio do Carmo; Attendance: 2,002; Referee: Michelangelo Almeida |

| 8 February 2026 | Santa Cruz | 1–0 | Decisão | Recife |
| 18:00 (UTC-3) | Patrick Allan 50' | Report | | Stadium: Estádio José do Rego Maciel (Arruda); Attendance: 0 Referee: Hugo Figueiredo |

==== Semi-finals ====
| 11 February 2026 | Santa Cruz | 0–1 | Náutico | São Lourenço da Mata |
| 20:00 (UTC-3) | | Report | Paulo Sérgio 17' | Stadium: Estádio Governador Carlos Wilson Campos (Arena Pernambuco); Attendance: 9,411; Referee: Bruno Arleu de Araújo |

| 22 February 2026 | Náutico | 2–0 | Santa Cruz | Recife |
| 18:00 (UTC-3) | Paulo Sérgio 45+6' (pen.), 72' | Report | | Stadium: Estádio Eládio de Barros Carvalho (Aflitos); Attendance: 16,181; Referee: Paulo César Zanovelli |

=== Copa do Brasil ===
==== Second round ====
| 5 March 2026 | Santa Cruz | 0–0 (2–4 p) | Sousa | São Lourenço da Mata |
| 21:30 (UTC-3) | | Report | | Stadium: Estádio Governador Carlos Wilson Campos (Arena Pernambuco); Attendance: 9,632; Referee: Paulo Jose Souza Mourão |
| | Penalties |
| | Ariel (penalty scored); Willian Júnior (penalty missed); Eurico (penalty scored); Marquinhos (penalty missed) | | (penalty scored) Veraldo; (penalty scored) Cristian; (penalty scored) Felipe Jacaré; (penalty scored) Diego Viana |

=== Série C ===
==== First stage ====
| 6 April 2026 1 | Santa Cruz | 1–0 | Itabaiana | São Lourenço da Mata |
| 20:00 (UTC-3) | Marquinhos 70' | Report | | Stadium: Estádio Governador Carlos Wilson Campos (Arena Pernambuco); Attendance: 10,267; Referee: Wagner Silveira Echevarria |

| 11 April 2026 2 | Floresta | 1–1 | Santa Cruz | Horizonte |
| 17:00 (UTC-3) | Daniel Troiano 33' | Report | Tiago Marques 35' | Stadium: Estádio Olímpico Horácio Domingos de Sousa (Domingão); Attendance: 436; Referee: Antônio Carlos Pequeno Frutuoso |

| 18 April 2026 3 | Confiança | 1–0 | Santa Cruz | Aracaju |
| 16:00 (UTC-3) | João Pedro 9' | Report | | Stadium: Estádio Lourival Baptista (Batistão); Attendance: 3,465; Referee: Paulo Roberto Alves Junior |

| 26 April 2026 4 | Santa Cruz | 0–1 | Amazonas | São Lourenço da Mata |
| 16:00 (UTC-3) | | Report | Schiappacasse 58' | Stadium: Estádio Governador Carlos Wilson Campos (Arena Pernambuco); Attendance: 13,501; Referee: Diego da Costa Cidral |

| 2 May 2026 5 | Guarani | 1–0 | Santa Cruz | Campinas |
| 17:00 (UTC-3) | Willian Farias 90+1' | Report | | Stadium: Estádio Brinco de Ouro da Princesa; Attendance: 5,550; Referee: Gustavo Ervino Bauermann |

| 11 May 2026 6 | Inter de Limeira | 1–2 | Santa Cruz | Limeira |
| 20:00 (UTC-3) | Getúlio 75' | Report | Ronald 59'; Saulo 74' (o.g.) | Stadium: Estádio Major José Levy Sobrinho; Attendance: 1,725; Referee: Marcos Mateus de Sousa |

| 16 May 2026 7 | Santa Cruz | 2–0 | Volta Redonda | São Lourenço da Mata |
| 17:00 (UTC-3) | Pedro Favela 8'; Marquinhos 80' | Report | | Stadium: Estádio Governador Carlos Wilson Campos (Arena Pernambuco); Attendance: 12,222; Referee: Marcos Mateus Pereira |

| 23 May 2026 8 | Maringá | 1–1 | Santa Cruz | Maringá |
| 19:30 (UTC-3) | Adeílson Maranhão 20' | Report | Pedro Favela 4' | Stadium: Estádio Willie Davids; Attendance: 2,614; Referee: Fabiano Monteiro dos Santos |

| 31 May 2026 9 | Santa Cruz | 1–1 | Ferroviária | São Lourenço da Mata |
| 16:00 (UTC-3) | Eurico 54' | Report | Denílson 24' | Stadium: Estádio Governador Carlos Wilson Campos (Arena Pernambuco); Attendance: 19,981; Referee: Maguielson Lima Barbosa |

| 14 June 2026 10 | Brusque | 0–1 | Santa Cruz | Brusque |
| 11:00 (UTC-3) | | Report | Edson Miranda 90+8' | Stadium: Estádio Augusto Bauer; Attendance: 2,033; Referee: Dewson Fernando Freitas da Silva |

| 20 June 2026 11 | Santa Cruz | 0–1 | Ypiranga | São Lourenço da Mata |
| 19:00 (UTC-3) | | Report | Estêvão 20' | Stadium: Estádio Governador Carlos Wilson Campos (Arena Pernambuco); Attendance: 12,310; Referee: Leonardo Willers Lorenzatto |

| 27 June 2026 12 | Paysandu | 1–3 | Santa Cruz | Belém |
| 17:00 (UTC-3) | Juninho 73' | Report | Juninho 26' (o.g.); Everaldo 45+1'; Fabinho 68' | Stadium: Estádio Leônidas Sodré de Castro (Curuzu); Attendance: 7,305; Referee: João Vitor Gobi |

| 4 July 2026 13 | Santa Cruz | 1–0 | Ituano | São Lourenço da Mata |
| 19:30 (UTC-3) | Renato 55' | Report | | Stadium: Estádio Governador Carlos Wilson Campos (Arena Pernambuco); Attendance: 10,935; Referee: Wagner Francisco Silva Souza |

| 12 July 2026 14 | Barra | 1–2 | Santa Cruz | Itajaí |
| 11:00 (UTC-3) | Renan Barnabé 52' | Report | Matheus Vinícius 24'; Quirino 36' | Stadium: Arena Barra FC; Attendance: 1,540; Referee: Artur de Morais Fernandes |

| 25 July 2026 15 | Santa Cruz | 0–1 | Figueirense | São Lourenço da Mata |
| 17:00 (UTC-3) | | Report | Emerson Galego 39' (pen.) | Stadium: Estádio Governador Carlos Wilson Campos (Arena Pernambuco); Attendance: 27,393; Referee: Kléber Ariel Gonçalves Silva |

| 8 August 2026 16 | Botafogo–PB | 2–2 | Santa Cruz | João Pessoa |
| 17:00 (UTC-3) | Dudu Hatamoto 15'; Lucas Cândido 63' | Report | Ronald 61'; Eron 71' | Stadium: Estádio José Américo de Almeida Filho (Almeidão); Attendance: 8,940; Referee: Emerson Souza Silva |

| 15 August 2026 17 | Santa Cruz | 0–1 | Maranhão | São Lourenço da Mata |
| 19:30 (UTC-3) | | Report | Felipe Cruz 33' | Stadium: Estádio Governador Carlos Wilson Campos (Arena Pernambuco); Attendance: 17,306; Referee: Antonio Dib Moraes de Sousa |

| 22 August 2026 18 | Santa Cruz | 2–0 | Caxias | São Lourenço da Mata |
| 19:30 (UTC-3) | Eron 41'; Matheus Vinícius 55' | Report | | Stadium: Estádio Governador Carlos Wilson Campos (Arena Pernambuco); Attendance: 13,774; Referee: Jefferson Ferreira de Moraes |

| 29 August 2026 19 | Anápolis | 1–1 | Santa Cruz | Anápolis |
| 17:00 (UTC-3) | Fernando Viana 74' | Report | Eurico 37' | Stadium: Estádio Jonas Duarte; Attendance: 3,179; Referee: Alisson Sidnei Furtado |

==== Second stage ====
| 6 September 2026 1 | Santa Cruz | 1–0 | Botafogo–PB | São Lourenço da Mata |
| 18:30 (UTC-3) | Eron 12' (pen.) | Report | | Stadium: Estádio Governador Carlos Wilson Campos (Arena Pernambuco); Attendance: 27,479; Referee: Dênis da Silva Ribeiro Serafim |

| 12 September 2026 2 | Maringá | 0–1 | Santa Cruz | Maringá |
| 19:30 (UTC-3) | | Report | Matheus Vinicius 90+3' | Stadium: Estádio Willie Davids; Attendance: 4,215; Referee: Anderson Ribeiro Goncalves |

| 20 September 2026 3 | Santa Cruz | 1–0 | Floresta | São Lourenço da Mata |
| 16:00 (UTC-3) | Renato 10' | Report | | Stadium: Estádio Governador Carlos Wilson Campos (Arena Pernambuco); Attendance: 44,951; Referee: João Vitor Gobi |

| 26 September 2026 4 | Floresta | 1–1 | Santa Cruz | Fortaleza |
| 17:00 (UTC-3) | Rafinha 15' | Report | Renato 85' | Stadium: Estádio Presidente Vargas; Attendance: 2,963; Referee: Márcio dos Santos Oliveira |

| 3 October 2026 5 | Santa Cruz | 1–1 | Maringá | São Lourenço da Mata |
| 17:00 (UTC-3) | Pedro Favela 50' | Report | Adeílson Maranhão 1' | Stadium: Estádio Governador Carlos Wilson Campos (Arena Pernambuco); Attendance: 45,500; Referee: Raphael Claus |

| 10 October 2026 6 | Botafogo–PB | 1–0 | Santa Cruz | João Pessoa |
| 17:00 (UTC-3) | Dudu Hatamoto 82' | Report | | Stadium: Estádio José Américo de Almeida Filho (Almeidão); Attendance: 1,518; Referee: Bruno Arleu de Araújo |
