= Paraibano (disambiguation) =

Paraibano is a town in Maranhão, Brazil.

Paraibano may also refer to:

- Demonym of Paraíba state, Brazil
- Campeonato Paraibano, a Brazilian football (soccer) competition
- Centro Sportivo Paraibano, a Brazilian football (soccer) player
