= Diego Quirino =

Brazilian footballer (born 1993)

Personal information
- Full name: Diego de Souza Quirino
- Date of birth: 14 October 1993 (age 33)
- Place of birth: Cambará, Brazil
- Height: 1.79 m (5 ft 10 in)
- Position: Forward

Team information
- Current team: Caxias

Youth career
- Londrina

Senior career*
Years	Team	Apps	(Gls)
2012–2017	Londrina	28	(3)
2012	→ Iraty (loan)	10	(1)
2014	→ Junior Team (loan)	7	(2)
2015	→ Foz do Iguaçu (loan)	12	(3)
2016	→ J. Malucelli (loan)	9	(1)
2017	→ Sergipe (loan)	9	(1)
2017	→ Operário Ferroviário (loan)	15	(5)
2018–2019	Operário Ferroviário	26	(3)
2019	→ Ypiranga-RS (loan)	18	(1)
2020	Taubaté	8	(2)
2020–2021	Ypiranga-RS	40	(14)
2022–2023	Avaí	8	(0)
2022	→ Novorizontino (loan)	27	(3)
2023	→ Ituano (loan)	47	(7)
2024	Inter de Limeira	13	(4)
2024	Mirassol	17	(1)
2024–2025	Ferroviária	26	(8)
2025	Londrina	14	(3)
2026	Santa Cruz	20	(5)
2026–	Caxias	5	(0)
- * Club domestic league appearances and goals as of 10 November 2026

Diego de Souza Quirino (born 14 October 1993), known as Diego Quirino or just Quirino, is a Brazilian footballer who plays as a forward for Caxias.

== Club career ==
Born in Cambará, Paraná, Quirino was a Londrina youth graduate, but made his senior debut while on loan at Iraty, in 2012. After featuring rarely for his parent club in 2013, he served loans at Junior Team and Foz do Iguaçu, before being more utilized in the 2015 season.

Quirino was again loaned in 2016 and 2017, moving to J. Malucelli, Sergipe and Operário Ferroviário. He signed a permanent deal with the latter club on 22 January 2018, but moved on loan to Ypiranga-RS on 15 April 2019.

Quirino terminated his link with Operário on 3 October 2019, and was announced at Taubaté in December. He returned to Ypiranga the following October, and became the top scorer of the 2021 Série C while at the club.

On 18 January 2022, Quirino signed a two-year contract with Avaí, newly promoted to the Série A.

== Career statistics ==
As of 17 February 2022

Club	Season	League			State League		Cup		Continental		Other		Total	
Club	Season	Division	Apps	Goals	Apps	Goals	Apps	Goals	Apps	Goals	Apps	Goals	Apps	Goals
Londrina	2012	Paranaense	—		0	0	—		—		—		0	0
Londrina	2013	Série D	0	0	2	0	—		—		—		2	0
Londrina	2014	Série D	0	0	—		1	0	—		—		1	0
Londrina	2015	Série C	22	3	—		—		—		—		22	3
Londrina	2016	Série B	0	0	4	0	1	0	—		—		5	0
Londrina	Total		22	3	6	0	2	0	—		—		30	3
Iraty (loan)	2012	Paranaense	—		10	1	—		—		—		10	1
Junior Team (loan)	2014	Paranaense 2ª Divisão	—		7	2	—		—		—		7	2
Foz do Iguaçu (loan)	2015	Série D	0	0	12	3	—		—		—		12	3
J. Malucelli (loan)	2016	Série D	9	1	—		—		—		—		9	1
Sergipe (loan)	2017	Série D	0	0	9	1	1	0	—		1 (Note: Appearance(s) in Copa do Nordeste)	0	11	1
Operário Ferroviário (loan)	2017	Série D	15	5	—		—		—		—		15	5
Operário Ferroviário	2018	Série C	17	1	5	2	—		—		—		22	3
Operário Ferroviário	2019	Série B	0	0	4	0	—		—		—		4	0
Operário Ferroviário	Total		17	1	9	2	—		—		—		26	3
Ypiranga-RS (loan)	2019	Série C	13	0	5	1	—		—		—		18	1
Taubaté	2020	Paulista A2	—		8	2	—		—		—		8	2
Ypiranga-RS	2020	Série C	8	1	—		—		—		—		8	1
Ypiranga-RS	2021	Série C	23	10	9	3	2	0	—		—		34	13
Ypiranga-RS	Total		31	11	9	3	2	0	—		—		42	14
Avaí	2022	Série A	0	0	5	0	0	0	—		1 (Note: Appearance(s) in Recopa Catarinense)	0	6	0
Career total			107	21	80	15	5	0	0	0	2	4	194	36

== Honours ==
Londrina

- Campeonato Paranaense: 2014

Operário Ferroviário

- Campeonato Brasileiro Série D: 2017
- Campeonato Paranaense Second Division: 2018
- Campeonato Brasileiro Série C: 2018

Ypiranga-RS

- Campeonato Gaúcho Série A2: 2019
