= Henágio =

Brazilian footballer (1961–2015)

Personal information
- Full name: Henágio Figueiredo dos Santos
- Date of birth: 10 December 1961
- Place of birth: Aracaju, Brazil
- Date of death: 26 October 2015 (aged 53)
- Place of death: Recife, Brazil
- Position: Midfielder

Youth career
- 1978: Sergipe

Senior career*
Years	Team	Apps	(Gls)
1979–1983	Sergipe		
1983–1985	Santa Cruz	195	(34)
1985–1986	Sport Recife		
1987	Guarani		
1987–1988	Flamengo	28	(4)
1988–1989	America-RJ		
1989	Figueirense		
1989	Pinheiros-PR		
1990	Paraná		
1991	Coritiba		
1991	Sampaio Corrêa		
1991	Tuna Luso		
1992–1993	Santa Cruz		
1993	Campinense		
1994	Santa Cruz		
1994	Treze		
1999	Cori-Sabbá		
2000	Vitória-PE		
2001	Cori-Sabbá		
- * Club domestic league appearances and goals as of 28 November 2023

Henágio Figueiredo dos Santos (10 December 1961 – 26 October 2015), simply known as Henágio, was a Brazilian professional footballer who played as a midfielder.

== Career ==
Initially a 400m athlete, Henágio received an invitation from CS Sergipe to take a test and join football. So a reserve player in the first years of his career, he gained prominence in 1982, where he was state champion and highlighted. He was hired by Santa Cruz FC in 1983 and was again successful in winning the Pernambuco state championship. He played for Flamengo, champion of the 1987 Copa União, in addition to being part of the last squad of EC Pinheiros, and the first of Paraná Clube. He ended his career in 1994, but returned in 1999 to play for Cori-Sabbá in the city of Floriano.

== Honours ==
Sergipe

- Campeonato Sergipano: 1982

Santa Cruz

- Campeonato Pernambucano: 1983, 1993

Flamengo

- Copa União Green Module: 1987
- Taça Guanabara: 1988

== Death ==
Henágio was found dead by a neighbor, on 26 October 2015, at his residence in the city of Recife.
