= Clássico das Emoções =

Brazilian football derby

- Location: Recife, Pernambuco, Brazil
- Teams: Náutico; Santa Cruz
- First meeting: July 29, 1917; Friendly match Santa Cruz 3–0 Náutico
- Latest meeting: January 25, 2025; Campeonato Pernambucano; Náutico 2–1 Santa Cruz
- Stadiums: Aflitos (Náutico); Arruda (Santa Cruz)

Statistics
- Total meetings: 534
- Most wins: Santa Cruz (203)
- Top scorer: Tará, Santa Cruz (17 goals)
- All-time series: Náutico: 173; Drawn: 158; Santa Cruz: 203
- Largest victory: July 9, 1944; Náutico 5–0 Santa Cruz; October 6, 1991; Náutico 0–5 Santa Cruz

The Clássico das Emoções (in English: Derby of Emotions) is the football rivalry between Clube Náutico Capibaribe and Santa Cruz Futebol Clube, both clubs from Recife, Pernambuco, Brazil. The first match between the two happened on May 26, 1918.

== Statistics ==
=== Head to head results ===
- Matches – 536
- Náutico wins – 175
- Santa Cruz wins – 203
- Drawn – 158
- Náutico goals – 744
- Santa Cruz goals – 827

=== Finals between Náutico and Santa Cruz ===
- Náutico won the Campeonato Pernambucano defeating Santa Cruz in the finals nine times: 1934, 1960, 1974, 1984, 1985, 1989, 2001, 2002, 2004.
- Santa Cruz won the Campeonato Pernambucano defeating Náutico in the finals seven times: 1946, 1959, 1970, 1976, 1983, 1993 e 1995.

=== Highest attendance ===
December 18, 1983
Santa Cruz 1–1 Náutico
Arruda
Attendance: 76,636 people

=== All-time top scorers ===
- Náutico: Baiano (15 goals) and Bita (13 goals)
- Santa Cruz: Tará (17 goals) and Betinho (14 goals)

== Honours ==
Competitions	Náutico	Santa Cruz
Campeonato Brasileiro Série C	1	1
Pernambucano Championship	24	29
Northeast Cup	–	1
Torneio dos Campeões do Norte–Nordeste	1	–
Total	26	31

== See also ==
- Clássico dos Clássicos
- Campeonato Pernambucano
