= Silva (footballer, born 1995) =

Brazilian footballer

Personal information
- Full name: Adniellyson da Silva Oliveira
- Date of birth: 7 September 1995 (age 31)
- Place of birth: Paraibano, Brazil
- Height: 1.77 m (5 ft 10 in)
- Position: Midfielder

Team information
- Current team: Santa Cruz
- Number: 26

Youth career
- Internacional

Senior career*
Years	Team	Apps	(Gls)
2015–2018	Internacional	6	(0)
2016–2017	→ Atlético Goianiense (loan)	20	(0)
2018	→ Sampaio Corrêa (loan)	13	(1)
2019–2020	Tubarão	3	(0)
2020	Boa Esporte	1	(0)
2020	Internacional	0	(0)
2020–2021	Chiasso	28	(0)
2021–2022	Sion	0	(0)
2021–2022	→ Yverdon (loan)	31	(0)
2022–2025	Yverdon	32	(1)
2024–2025	Yverdon II	5	(0)
2025	→ Nyon (loan)	16	(0)
2026	Camboriú	32	(1)
2026–	Santa Cruz	32	(1)
- * Club domestic league appearances and goals as of 9 November 2026

Adniellyson da Silva Oliveira (born 7 September 1995), simply known as Silva, is a Brazilian footballer who plays for Santa Cruz as midfielder.

== Club career ==
On 24 June 2021, he joined Yverdon in Swiss Challenge League on loan. On 11 July 2022, Silva returned to Yverdon on a permanent basis and signed a three-year contract. On 8 January 2025, Silva was loaned to Nyon.

== Career statistics ==
As of 12 August 2017

Club	Season	League			State League		Cup		Conmebol		Other		Total	
Club	Season	Division	Apps	Goals	Apps	Goals	Apps	Goals	Apps	Goals	Apps	Goals	Apps	Goals
Internacional	2015	Série A	6	0	—		1	0	—		—		7	0
Internacional	2016	Série A	0	0	1	0	0	0	—		1 (Note: Appearance(s) in Primeira Liga)	0	2	0
Internacional	Subtotal		6	0	1	0	1	0	—		1	0	9	0
Atlético Goianiense	2016	Série B	9	0	—		—		—		—		9	0
Atlético Goianiense	2017	Série A	9	0	11	0	1	0	—		—		21	0
Atlético Goianiense	Subtotal		18	0	11	0	1	0	—		—		30	0
Career total			24	0	12	0	2	0	—		1	0	39	0
