= Ramón (footballer, born 1950) =

Brazilian footballer and manager

Ramon
Personal information
- Full name: Ramón da Silva Ramos
- Date of birth: March 12, 1950 (age 76)
- Place of birth: Sirinhaém, Brazil
- Position: Forward

Senior career*
Years	Team	Apps	(Gls)
1970–1975	Santa Cruz	112	(39)
1976	Internacional		
1976	Sport	11	(3)
1976–1979	Vasco	22	(11)
1979–1981	Goiás	32	(8)
1981–1982	Ceará	15	(10)
1983	São José		
1984	Ferroviário		
1985	Brasília		

Managerial career
- 1995–1996: Ferroviário
- * Club domestic league appearances and goals

Ramón da Silva Ramos, commonly known as just Ramón (born March 12, 1950), is a former Brazilian football forward, who played in several Série A clubs. He was the top goalscorer of the Série A 1973.

== Playing career ==
Ramon was born in Sirinhaém, state of Pernambuco, and started playing professionally in 1970, defending Santa Cruz, in which he played 112 games and scored 39 goals for the club, finishing as the Série A 1973 top goalscorer with 23 goals. He left the club in 1975, briefly playing for Internacional, and Sport in 1976, playing eleven Série A games and scoring three goals for the latter club. Ramon then joined Rio de Janeiro-based Vasco in 1976, scoring eleven Série A goals in 22 games, before moving to Goiás in 1979, in which he played Brazilian National League 32 games and scored eight goals. He moved to Ceará in 1981, scoring 15 Série A games in ten games, before leaving the club in the following year. After defending São José in 1983 and Ferroviário in 1984, he retired while defending Brasília in 1985.

== Coaching career ==
After his retirement, he worked in 1995 and in 1996 as Ferroviário's head coach.

== Honors ==
=== Individual ===
- Campeonato Brasileiro Série A Top Goalscorer: 1973

=== Club ===
Ceará

- Campeonato Pernambucano: 1981

Santa Cruz

- Campeonato Pernambucano: 1970, 1971, 1972, 1973

Vasco

- Campeonato Carioca: 1977
