= Eurico (footballer, born 1994) =

Brazilian footballer

Personal information
- Full name: Eurico Nicolau de Lima Neto
- Date of birth: 16 April 1994 (age 32)
- Place of birth: Santa Luzia, Brazil
- Height: 1.82 m (5 ft 11 1/2 in)
- Position: Defensive midfielder

Team information
- Current team: Santa Cruz
- Number: 3

Youth career
- Cruzeiro

Senior career*
Years	Team	Apps	(Gls)
2014–2019	Cruzeiro	11	(0)
2016	→ Ponte Preta (loan)	3	(0)
2016	→ Náutico (loan)	11	(0)
2017	→ Botafogo-SP (loan)	0	(0)
2018	→ Tupi (loan)	0	(0)
2018	→ Ipatinga (loan)	8	(1)
2019	Villa Nova	9	(0)
2020–2023	Alverca	67	(3)
2023–2024	Anadia	22	(0)
2025	Betim	10	(3)
2025–	Santa Cruz	55	(4)

International career
2015	Brazil U23	4	(0)
Medal record
Representing Brazil
Men's Football
Pan American Games
Bronze medal – third place	2015 Toronto	Team competition
- * Club domestic league appearances and goals as of 3 September 2024

Eurico Nicolau de Lima Neto (born 16 April 1994), simply known as Eurico, is a Brazilian footballer who plays as a defensive midfielder for Santa Cruz.
