= Tiago Marques =

Brazilian footballer

Personal information
- Full name: Tiago Marques Rezende
- Date of birth: 3 March 1988 (age 38)
- Place of birth: Jataí, Brazil
- Height: 1.92 m (6 ft 4 in)
- Position: Forward

Team information
- Current team: Santa Cruz
- Number: 23

Senior career*
Years	Team	Apps	(Gls)
2007–2011	XV de Piracicaba		
2011–2012	Comercial	1	(0)
2012	Ferroviária		
2013	Atlético Sorocaba	17	(3)
2013	Grêmio Barueri	16	(6)
2014–2017	Ferroviária	29	(10)
2016	→ Botafogo-SP (loan)	7	(2)
2017	Juventude	32	(11)
2018–2019	Jeju United	51	(15)
2019	Ponte Preta	5	(0)
2020	Água Santa	7	(0)
2020	Ferroviária	16	(11)
2021	Santo André	12	(0)
2021	Ituano	23	(6)
2022–2023	Criciúma	15	(2)
2024–2025	CSA	50	(22)
2026	North	6	(2)
2026	Santa Cruz	17	(1)
- * Club domestic league appearances and goals as of 9 November 2026

Tiago Marques Rezende (born March 3, 1988), known as Tiago Marques, is a Brazilian footballer who plays as a forward for Santa Cruz.

== Career statistics ==
As of match played 7 February 2026

Club	Season	League			State League		Cup		Continental		Other		Total	
Club	Season	Division	Apps	Goals	Apps	Goals	Apps	Goals	Apps	Goals	Apps	Goals	Apps	Goals
XV de Piracicaba	2007	Paulista A3	—		3	0	—		—		2 (Note: All appearance(s) in Copa Paulista)	0	5	0
Comercial	2011	Paulista A2	—		—		—		—		14	1	14	1
Comercial	2012	Paulista	—		1	0	—		—		—		1	0
Comercial	Total		—		1	0	—		—		14	1	15	1
Ferroviária	2012	Paulista A2	—		10	3	—		—		16	5	26	8
Atlético Sorocaba	2013	Paulista	—		17	3	—		—		—		17	3
Grêmio Barueri	2013	Série C	16	6	—		—		—		—		16	6
Ferroviária	2014	Paulista A2	—		—		—		—		8	2	8	2
Ferroviária	2016	Paulista	—		10	2	4	3	—		—		14	5
Ferroviária	2017	Paulista	—		14	5	1	1	—		—		15	6
Ferroviária	Total		—		24	7	5	4	—		8	2	37	13
Botafogo–SP (loan)	2016	Série C	7	2	—		—		—		—		7	2
Juventude	2017	Série B	32	11	—		—		—		—		32	11
Jeju United	2018	K League 1	31	8	—		3	4	3	0	—		37	12
Jeju United	2019	K League 1	15	4	—		1	0	—		—		16	4
Jeju United	Total		46	12	—		4	4	3	0	—		53	16
Ponte Preta	2019	Série B	5	0	—		—		—		—		5	0
Água Santa	2020	Paulista	—		7	0	—		—		—		7	0
Ferroviária	2020	Série D	16	11	—		0	0	—		—		16	11
Santo André	2021	Série D	—		12	0	—		—		—		12	0
Ituano	2021	Série D	23	6	—		—		—		—		23	6
Criciúma	2022	Série B	3	0	—		1	0	—		—		4	0
Criciúma	2023	Série B	12	2	0	0	0	0	—		—		12	2
Criciúma	Total		15	2	0	0	1	0	—		—		16	2
CSA	2024	Série C	15	9	9	2	—		—		1 (Note: All appearance(s) in Copa Nordeste)	0	25	11
CSA	2025	Série C	17	6	9	5	6	3	—		9	3	41	17
CSA	Total		32	15	18	7	6	3	—		10	3	66	28
North	2026	Mineiro	—		6	2	—		—		0	0	6	2
Career total			192	65	98	22	16	11	3	0	50	11	359	109
