= Eron (footballer, born 1998) =

Brazilian footballer

Personal information
- Full name: Eronildo dos Santos Rocha
- Date of birth: 16 July 1998 (age 28)
- Place of birth: Salvador, Bahia, Brazil
- Height: 1.75 m (5 ft 9 in)
- Position: Forward

Team information
- Current team: Santa Cruz
- Number: 28

Youth career
- Vitória

Senior career*
Years	Team	Apps	(Gls)
2018–2021	Vitória	53	(5)
2020	→ Remo (loan)	8	(0)
2022	Sampaio Corrêa	32	(8)
2022	ABC	3	(0)
2023	Caxias	36	(18)
2023	Vila Nova	0	(0)
2024–2025	Vegalta Sendai	54	(6)
2026–	Santa Cruz	18	(3)

International career
2015	Brazil U17	12	(9)
- * Club domestic league appearances and goals as of 9 November 2026

Eronildo dos Santos Rocha (born 16 July 1998), simply known as Eron, is a Brazilian professional footballer who plays as forward for Santa Cruz .

When playing for Vitória in 2020, he was rumoured to negotiate with a club in Azerbaijan. Instead, he was loaned to Remo before later transferring to Sampaio Corrêa. In 2023, he became top goalscorer and helped Caxias win promotion to Série C.

== Career statistics ==
=== Club ===
As of match played 7 December 2024

Appearances and goals by club, season and competition
Club	Season	League			State league		National cup (Note: Includes Copa do Brasil, Emperor's Cup)		League cup (Note: Includes J.League Cup)		Other		Total	
Club	Season	Division	Apps	Goals	Apps	Goals	Apps	Goals	Apps	Goals	Apps	Goals	Apps	Goals
Vitória	2018	Série A	2	0	0	0	0	0	—		—		2	0
Vitória	2019	Série B	18	1	2 (Note: Appearance(s) in Campeonato Baiano)	0	0	0	—		2 (Note: Appearance(s) in Copa do Nordeste)	0	22	1
Vitória	2020	Série B	3	0	8	4	0	0	—		1	0	12	4
Vitória	2021	Série B	11	0	3	0	2	0	—		2	0	18	0
Vitória	Total		34	1	13	4	2	0	—		5	0	54	5
Remo (loan)	2020	Série C	8	0	0	0	0	0	—		0	0	8	0
Sampaio Corrêa	2022	Série B	11	1	— (Note: Appearance(s) in Campeonato Maranhense)	3	2	1	—		8	3	21+	8
ABC	2022	Série C	3	0	0	0	0	0	—		—		3	0
Caxias	2023	Série D	22	14	14 (Note: Appearance(s) in Campeonato Gaúcho)	4	—		—		—		36	18
Vegalta Sendai	2024	J2 League	30	3	—		0	0	0	0	2 (Note: Appearance(s) in J2 League Promotion play-offs)	1	32	4
Career total			108	19	27+	11	4	1	0	0	15	4	154+	35
