= Ronald (footballer, born 1997) =

Brazilian footballer (born february 1997)

Personal information
- Full name: Ronald Santanna Rodrigues
- Date of birth: 5 February 1997 (age 29)
- Place of birth: Bom Jesus do Itabapoana, Brazil
- Height: 1.62 m (5 ft 4 in)
- Position: Winger

Team information
- Current team: Santa Cruz
- Number: 17

Youth career
- Internacional

Senior career*
Years	Team	Apps	(Gls)
2018	Internacional	1	(0)
2018–2019	Boavista B	12	(2)
2019–2021	Botafogo-SP	47	(6)
2021–2022	Botafogo	33	(0)
2022	→ Novorizontino (loan)	23	(2)
2023–2024	Água Santa	19	(0)
2023	→ Vila Nova (loan)	4	(0)
2024	Operário Ferroviário	30	(3)
2025	CRB	4	(0)
2025	Operário Ferroviário	6	(0)
2026	Tombense	8	(1)
2026–	Santa Cruz	22	(2)
- * Club domestic league appearances and goals as of 9 November 2026

Ronald Santanna Rodrigues (born 5 February 1997), simply known as Ronald, is a Brazilian footballer who plays as a winger for Santa Cruz.

== Club career ==
Born in Bom Jesus do Itabapoana, Rio de Janeiro, Ronald was an Internacional youth graduate. He made his first team debut on 27 January 2018, coming on as a late substitute for Marcinho in a 3–0 Campeonato Gaúcho home win over Avenida.

On 31 August 2018, Ronald moved abroad and joined Portuguese side Boavista. However, he only featured for the B-side before returning to his home country on 20 May 2019, after signing for Botafogo-SP.

A regular starter for the Pantera, Ronald moved to Botafogo on 20 February 2021. Regularly used, he suffered an ankle injury in July, being sidelined for the remainder of the campaign, which ended in promotion.

== Career statistics ==
As of 16 February 2022

Club	Season	League			State League		Cup		Continental		Other		Total	
Club	Season	Division	Apps	Goals	Apps	Goals	Apps	Goals	Apps	Goals	Apps	Goals	Apps	Goals
Internacional	2018	Série A	0	0	1	0	0	0	—		—		1	0
Boavista B	2018–19	AF Porto Divisão de Elite	12	2	—		—		—		—		12	2
Botafogo-SP	2019	Paulista B	2	0	—		—		—		—		2	0
Botafogo-SP	2020	Paulista B	32	5	13	1	—		—		—		45	6
Botafogo-SP	Subtotal		34	5	13	1	—		—		—		47	6
Botafogo	2021	Série B	15	0	13	0	1	0	—		—		29	0
Botafogo	2022	Série A	0	0	3	0	0	0	—		—		3	0
Botafogo	Subtotal		15	0	16	0	1	0	—		—		32	0
Career total			61	7	30	1	1	0	0	0	0	0	92	8

== Honours ==
Botafogo

- Campeonato Brasileiro Série B: 2021
