= Santa Cruz Futebol Clube =

Brazilian association football club based in Recife, Pernambuco, Brazil

Santa Cruz
- Full name: Santa Cruz Futebol Clube
- Nicknames: Cobra Coral (Coral Snake); Terror Do Nordeste (Terror of the Northeastern Region); O Mais Querido (The most dear); Time de Guerreiros (Team of Warriors); Time do Povo (People's Team); Clube da Multidão (Crowd Club)
- Founded: 3 February 1914; 112 years ago
- Stadium: Estádio do Arruda
- Capacity: 60,044
- Owner(s): Cobra Coral Participações S/A (90%); Associação civil Santa Cruz Futebol Clube (10%)
- President: Bruno Rodrigues
- Head coach: Cristian de Souza
- League: Campeonato Brasileiro Série C Campeonato Pernambucano
- 2025 2025: Série D, 2nd of 64 (promoted); Pernambucano, 3rd of 10
- Website: santacruzpe.com.br
Home colors	Away colors

Santa Cruz Futebol Clube, better known as Santa Cruz, and sometimes just Santa, is a Brazilian multisport club based in the city of Recife. Founded on 3 February 1914, it is nicknamed "O Mais Querido das Multidões" (The Most Beloved of the Crowds)

Among its main achievements are a Campeonato Brasileiro – Série C and a Copa do Nordeste. Among its state titles, 29 Campeonato Pernambucano stand out, including three editions designated as Supercampeonato Pernambucano, making it the only three-time Pernambuco Super Champion. It also has five wins in the now defunct Copa Pernambuco. In addition to its main titles, Santa Cruz also won the 1979 Fita Azul, a soccer honor given to Brazilian clubs that went on friendly tours abroad and returned undefeated. At the official international level, it has participated in a CONMEBOL competition, the 2016 Copa Sudamericana.

In the Campeonato Brasileiro – Série A, its best finish was in 1960 and 1975, when it came in fourth place. Between 1969 and 1983, Santa Cruz won nine state titles out of fifteen contested. During this fruitful period for the club, considered the best in its history, players such as Givanildo, Nunes, Fumanchu, and Ramón shone. In 1972, in the midst of its golden age, the Estádio do Arruda was inaugurated.

With seven strikers with over 100 goals, Santa Cruz was the first club in the Northeast Region, of Brazil and the twelfth in Brazil to reach the milestone of 10,000 goals scored.

Its official colors are black, white and red. It usually plays its matches at its Estádio do Arruda, the sixth largest in Brazil and the second largest privately owned stadium. As the second most popular club in Pernambuco, its two biggest sporting rivals are Sport Club do Recife, with whom it plays the Clássico das Multidões (Derby of the Multitudes), and Clube Náutico Capibaribe, with whom it plays the Clássico das Emoções (Derby of Emotions).

== History ==
=== Early history ===
On 3 February 1914, eleven young men aging from 14 to 16 years founded a football society. Because the boys used to play football on the streets by the yard of the Santa Cruz Church, the club was named after that church, which is situated on Santa Cruz Street in Recife. At the first meeting, they decided the position of each member, the name of the club "Santa Cruz Foot-Ball Club", and the society's colors.

The original colors were black and white. Some time after, the color pattern was changed because another local team (Sport Club Flamengo) already had those colors. Therefore, the club included the red color by suggestion of Teófilo Batista de Carvalho, also known as Lacraia. Lacraia has participated in all major early events of Santa Cruz's history, except the foundation.

Many people came to see the first match at Derby plains. The "team of boys" as Santa Cruz was called at the time beat Rio Negro (Black River) by 7–0. Rio Negro demanded revenge in another match. Curiously, the terms of the revenge stated that Sílvio Machado (he scored five goals in the first match) could not play. Despite that, Santa Cruz accepted the challenge. Carlindo, who substituted Sílvio Machado, scored six goals and Santa Cruz won again by 9–0. A subsequent victory over the Western Telegraph Company team, very famous at the time, made the popularity of Santa Cruz increase even more. The club was almost closed in its very first year. Some members proposed to use the club funds to buy a sugarcane juice extractor. Alexandre Carvalho (see members above) violently disapproved of such an offensive proposal and effectively saved the club. In early 20th century Recife, football was regarded as an elite sport. It was played mostly by upper-class boys and by the workers of English companies that operated in Recife. At that time racism was common and Afro-Brazilians were not allowed to play football. Santa Cruz, however, was the first team in Pernambuco to accept them. Lacraia, was the first one. This fact contributed to the popularity of the team, as black people are numerous in Brazilian population. Campeonato Pernambucano

In 1915, there was Brazilian football's greatest comeback. At Aflitos stadium, Santa Cruz was trailing América (Pernambuco), 5–1, but in the bottom 15 minutes of the match the score changed, 6–5. In 1917, the club was accepted into the Pernambucan Sport League, the precursor name of the Pernambucan Football Federation.

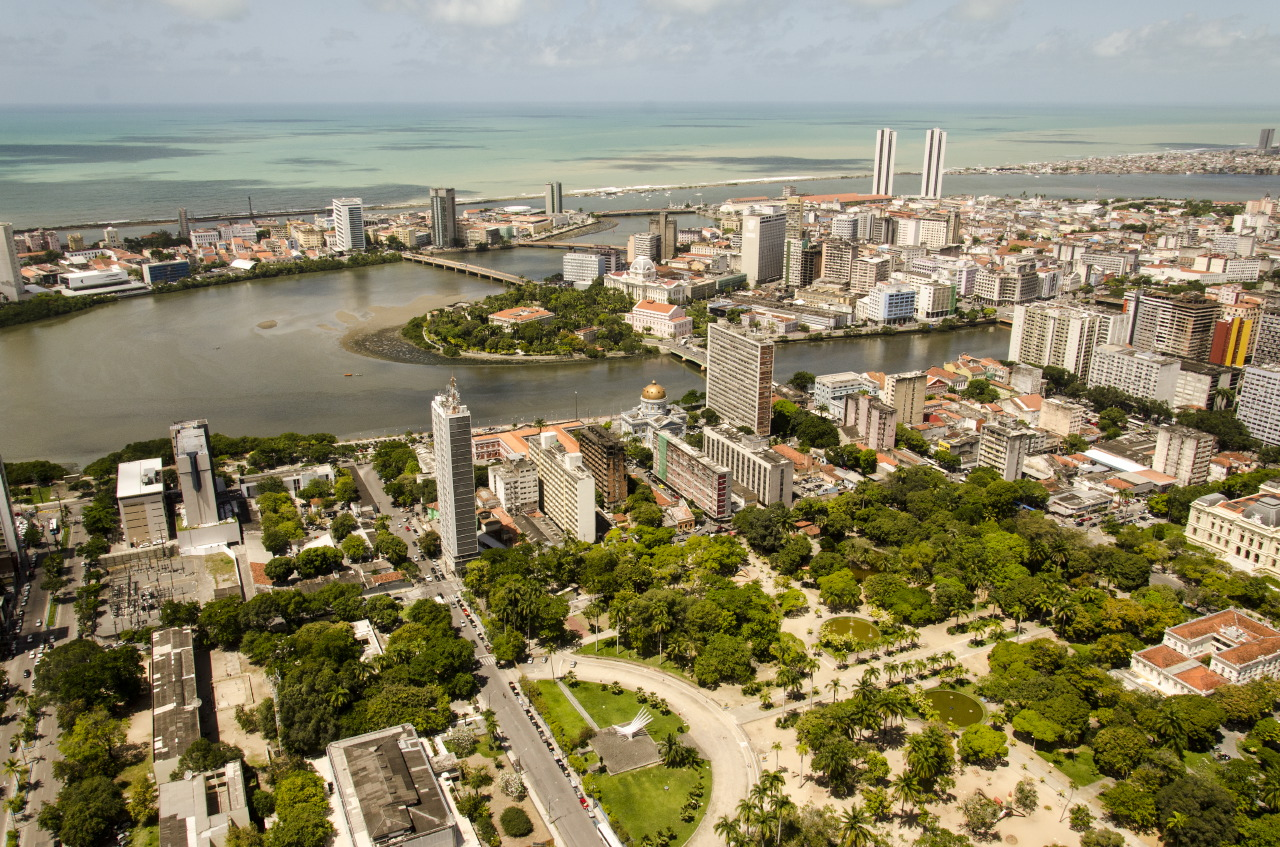
Boa Vista neighborhood, where Santa Cruz Futebol Clube was founded

On 30 January 1919, Santa Cruz beat Botafogo 3–2 on the Malaquias field. Alberto Santos-Dumont, the airplane pioneer, was in Recife, but was unnoticed: Santa Cruz's victory took everyone's attention. On 31 January, the Jornal Pequeno (Small Newspaper) printed in the headlines: "Botafogo Futebol Clube is beaten by the home boys by 3–2." It was the first time that a northern-northeastern team beat a team from the south-eastern region of Brazil.

On 13 December 1931, Santa Cruz with Tará and Sherlock as the most important contributors successfully pursued its first Campeonato Pernambucano against Torre, 2–0. On 10 October 1934, the Brazil national team, newly home from the 1934 World Cup in Italy, played some friendlies against the major teams of Pernambuco: Sport Recife was defeated 4–2; Náutico was beaten 8–3, and Santa Cruz was defeated 3–1. A ship delay on return to Rio de Janeiro enabled Santa Cruz to equalize the initial loss, 3–2.

==== Suicidal Tour ====
In 1943, faced with financial hardship, the club arranged for 5 friendly matches against local-club Transviário Esporte Clube in Belém, Pará to promote Santa Cruz's image and a payday of five million Brazilian réis. Their travel to Belém was marked by fears of attacks by German U-boats, as the tour began during World War II. This resulted in their steamboat, Pará, being escorted by two Brazilian Naval ships and the steamboat having to sail with its lights off.

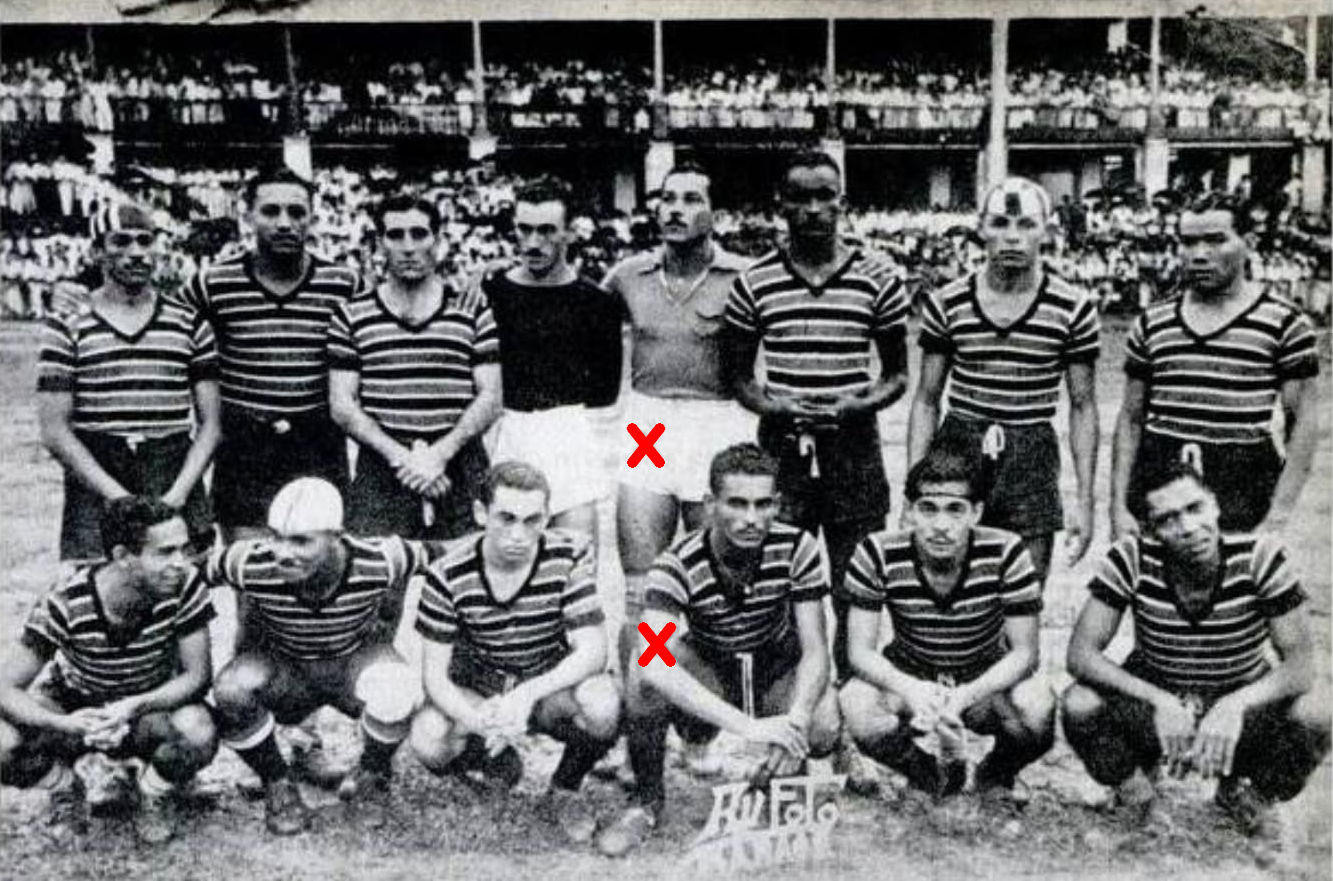
The 1943 Santa Cruz squad. (Players marked with a red cross died during the tour)

After the five friendly matches, the club was invited to extend their club tour into Amazonas by Olímpico Clube. This resulted in the team traveling by steamboat up the Amazon River at a speed of ten nautical miles per day, resulting in a two-week travel time to reach Manaus. During their stint in Amazonas, the head of the delegation and six players contracted dysentery after their match against Rio Negro, to which those effected recovered before their next matches.

After the matches in Amazonas, the delegation aimed for an international stint in Peru and Guyana, but was blocked by the Brazilian Sports Federation at the request of the Ministry of Foreign Affairs for clubs to not leave the country during World War II. Facing a 90-day suspension if they continued on, the delegation gave up and returned to Belém via steamboat. During this return, two of the players, Goalkeeper King and striker Papeira, were diagnosed with typhoid fever, resulting in hospitalization and, eventually, their deaths.

In total, at least 26 (Note: Some sources state the club played 28 matches over the course of the tour.) matches were played over the course of a 4-month tour, which left two players dead and the club broke again, after paying travel costs and funeral expenses. From this, the club tour became known as the "Suicidal Tour" due to the deaths, difficulties faced, financial hardship, and the threat of German submarine attacks.

=== 1960s and 1970s ===
During the late 1960s and the 1970s, Santa Cruz achieved greater popularity. Much of that was due to the 5 times state championship title achievement (State Penta-championship) of Santa Cruz. Santa Cruz's impressive performances in the National championship, expanded awareness of the club's talent beyond the state of Pernambuco. Santa Cruz in Série A increased awareness about its abilities outside of the state when the club out performed Flamengo in 1965 at Maracanã Stadium, 3–1. The club were having great performances and obtained first place in the National Championship's first stage.

In 1972, Pelé played his 1000th match against Santa Cruz.

In 1975, Santa Cruz reached the semi-finals of the Campeonato Brasileiro, a first for a northeastern team. The controversial semi-final against Cruzeiro on 7 December ended with Cruzeiro winning 3–2. The club achieved fourth place, their best performance in the National Championship to date. Santa Cruz went without a match loss in 1977 and 1978 during their successful pursuit of the Brazilian Championship for 35 consecutive seasons, the second greatest title run in the national competition. In 1978, Santa Cruz was the first team to qualify for the 2nd Stage of the National Championship, with 23 points. In the second and third stages, Santa Cruz topped both of their groups, and qualified for the quarterfinals, where they lost to Sport Club Internacional. In the final standings, Santa Cruz finished in fifth.

=== 1980s and 1990s ===
During the 1980s, Santa Cruz was relegated to the Second Division of the National Championship twice (1982 and 1989). Since then the club's performance in national competitions has declined.

In the early 1990s, Santa Cruz won three successive state championships: (1990, 1993 and 1995). However, being in the second division of the National Championship often eclipsed such achievements. Moreover, in the following years, Santa Cruz had to share the championship 5 consecutive titles with an arch-rival. Santa Cruz unsuccessfully stopped Sport Recife in their pursuit of a 5th successive championship. Nevertheless, in 1996, Maurício was the top scorer of the 2nd Division Brazilian Championship with 13 goals.

=== 2000–11: More decline ===
Since the final match in the 2006 Campeonato Pernambucano vs. Sport, in which Sport won the championship, the team has experienced a new decline. It was delegated to Second Division in 2006 and then to the Third Division in 2007 after weak campaigns. That latest decline also included eliminations in the first rounds of the Copa do Brasil (2007 and 2009) by weaker teams like Nacional Fast Clube and Americano, that were then playing regional competitions.

Continuing the decline was the downfall into Hexagonal da Morte, the bottom six, in the 2008 Campeonato Pernambucano, narrowly escaping relegation in the seventh match. Also, in September 2008, after another weak campaign in the 2008 Série C, Santa Cruz was relegated to the new Fourth Division for 2009, becoming the first club to fall from First Division to Fourth in three years.

=== 2011–present ===
In 2011, Santa Cruz started a reaction. The club was eliminated from the Copa do Brasil in the second phase by São Paulo, but had a respectable performance. Santa Cruz won the first game 1–0, but lost in the second game 2–0. On 15 May, Santa Cruz won the Campeonato Pernambucano, beating Sport Recife. That year, Santa Cruz had the highest attendance average in all Brazilian football, beating teams like Flamengo and Corinthians.

In 2013, Santa Cruz won the Campeonato Pernambucano, and became tricampeão (three-time consecutive champion), beating rivals Sport Recife as they had done in 2011 and 2012 as well.

In May 2016, Santa Cruz won the Copa do Nordeste for the first time in its history, and earned a spot in the 2016 Copa Sudamericana, their first international participation. The team began their campaign in the second stage, beating Sport Recife 1–0 on aggregate. In the third stage, the club was paired up with Colombian club Independiente Medellín. Santa Cruz lost the first leg in Colombia 2–0, but won 3–1 in Recife with a hat-trick from Grafite, although it was not enough and the club was eliminated on away goals. The team also won the Campeonato Pernambuco that year, beating Sport again, as they had done in the previous four finals.

On 30 August 2025, Santa Cruz won the first leg of the quarter-finals of the 2025 Campeonato Brasileiro Série D 1–0 over América de Natal, at the Arena Pernambuco. As they only needed a draw to secure promotion to the Série C, Santa Cruz went to the packed Arena das Dunas for the decisive game. América de Natal opened the scoring three minutes into the second half, but late in the match, Santa Cruz scored the goal that secured their spot in the 2026 Brazilian Championship Série C.

In the semi-finals, Santa Cruz defeated Maranhão 1–0 on aggregate and advanced to the final against Barra. In the final, they lost the first leg 2–1 at Arena Pernambuco and drew 0–0 in the second leg, finishing as runner-up.

== Symbols ==
=== Colors ===
The original colors of the club were black and white. However, at that time, the Pernambucan Sport League did not allow the participation of different clubs with the same colors. Thus, the red color was introduced to differentiate from the color pattern of Sport Club Flamengo.

Santa Cruz is also known as O Tricolor (The Tricolor) and its fans as Tricolores.

90-years Commemorative badge

=== Badge ===
Teófilo de Carvalho aka Lácraia, an engineering student and the first black football player in northeastern Brazil, he was responsible for designing the Santa Cruz crest. He chose to create a stylized white anchor flanked by buds, red on the left and black on the right, with the monogram S.C.F.C. superimposed. The anchor symbolizes steadfastness and tranquility. In the 1970s, there was a statutory change that reversed the position of the red and black colors on the crest. In 1959, Santa used a crest similar to that of São Paulo, due to the use of a shirt in honor of Lanzoninho, a former São Paulo player who was Pernambuco champion in 1957. The use of this crest was only circumstantial.

=== Mascot ===
With the adoption of three colors, the striped jersey of Santa Cruz resembled a Coral snake. Due to this, the team is known by the fans as Coral.

=== Anthem ===
The official anthem of the club is widely unknown by the fans. However, a march named O Mais Querido (The Dearest One) by Lourenço da Fonseca Barbosa (Capiba) is very popular and is the de facto anthem.

== Stadium ==
The team's stadium, Estádio José do Rego Maciel, is located in Arruda, a borough of Recife. It is named after a former mayor of Recife. It is widely known as Estádio do Arruda (Arruda Stadium). The fans call it Arrudão (Big Arruda) or Mundão do Arruda (Great Land of Arruda).

On 1 April 1982, the stadium was re-inaugurated after improvements and enlargement. From the original capacity of 64,000 people, the maximum capacity was then estimated at 110,000. However, due to safety reasons, the maximum capacity so far is 90,200, which occurred in a Brazil vs Argentina match on 23 March 1994. Since then the official stadium capacity has been reduced to 60,044.

The stadium is also known as the Repúblicas Independentes do Arruda (Independent Republics of Arruda).

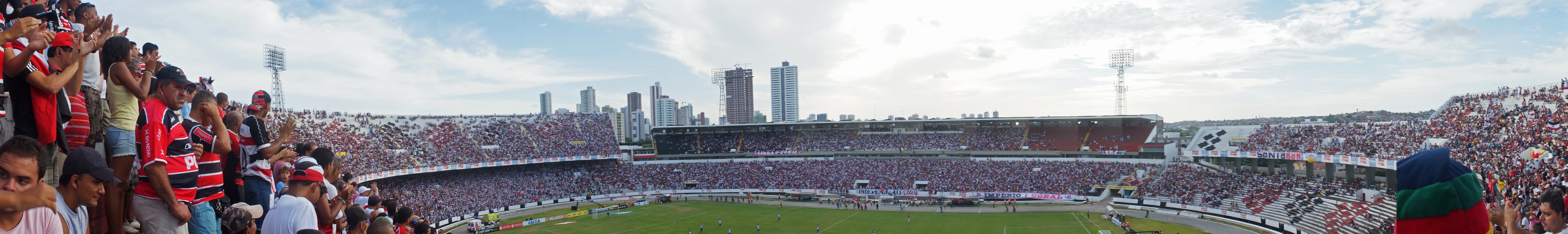
The Estádio José do Rego Maciel, popularly known as "Arruda," is the sixth largest football stadium in Brazil, with a capacity for 60,044 people

== Honours ==
=== Official tournaments ===
National
Competitions	Titles	Seasons
Campeonato Brasileiro Série C	1	2013
Regional
Competitions	Titles	Seasons
Copa do Nordeste	1	2016
State
Competitions	Titles	Seasons
Campeonato Pernambucano	29	1931, 1932, 1933, 1935, 1940, 1946, 1947, 1957, 1959, 1969, 1970, 1971, 1972, 1973, 1976, 1978, 1979, 1983, 1986, 1987, 1990, 1993, 1995, 2005, 2011, 2012, 2013, 2015, 2016
Copa Pernambuco	5	2008, 2009, 2010, 2012, 2019

- record

=== Others tournaments ===
==== International ====
- Marco Antonio Maciel Tournament (1): 1979
- Vinausteel Tournament (1): 2003

==== Regional and Inter-state ====
- Torneio Bahia-Pernambuco (1): 1956
- Torneio Paraíba-Pernambuco (1): 1962
- Torneio Hexagonal Norte-Nordeste (1): 1967
- Taça Asa Branca (1): 2017

==== State ====
- Torneio Início de Pernambuco (12): 1919, 1926, 1937, 1939, 1946, 1947, 1954, 1956, 1969, 1971, 1972, 1976

=== Runners-up ===
- Campeonato Brasileiro Série B (3): 1999, 2005, 2015
- Campeonato Brasileiro Série D (2): 2011, 2025
- Campeonato Pernambucano (31): 1915, 1916, 1917, 1918, 1920, 1921, 1929, 1934, 1936, 1937, 1938, 1939, 1943, 1949, 1953, 1960, 1962, 1974, 1980, 1984, 1985, 1989, 1996, 1999, 2000, 2001, 2002, 2003, 2004, 2006, 2020
- Copa Pernambuco (2): 1998, 2011

=== The Super-Championship ===
The Pernambucan Football Championship is usually divided into three turns. Each turn is a small championship itself. If a team wins all the three turns then it is automatically declared as champion. If a team wins two turns and another team wins the remaining turn, the championship has a final play-off. Generally, the play-off consists of two matches or three matches. However, if three different teams win each one a turn, the championship has a play-off named the Super-championship. The Super-championship consists of a play-off among the three winners of each turn. Super-championships are rare and very prestigious.

=== Awards ===
- Fita Azul (1): 1979

Fita Azul do Futebol Brasileiro (Brazilian Football Blue Ribbon) was an award given for the club which succeeds in an excursion out of the country.

In the Middle East, Santa Cruz played against the national teams of

- Kuwait (1–5 and 1–1)
- Bahrain (0–3)
- Qatar (0–4 and 1–4)
- Dubai (one of the Arab Emirates) (1–2)
- Abu Dhabi (one of the Arab Emirates) (0–3)

Santa Cruz also played

- Al-Aim (0–3)
- Nasser Sport Club (2–6)
- Al-Hilal of Saudi Arabia (0–3)

In Europe there were two matches. The first was against the Romania national team (2–4), and the second against Paris Saint-Germain (2–2).

== Statistics ==
=== Participations ===
Participating in 2025

Competition		Seasons	Best campaign	Debut	Last
	Campeonato Pernambucano	111	Champion (29 times)	1915	2025
	Copa do Nordeste	18	Champion (2016)	1994	2025
(Brazil)	Série A	24	4th place (1960 and 1975)	1960	2016
(Brazil)	Série B	20	2nd place (3 times)	1982	2017
(Brazil)	Série C	7	Champion (2013)	2008	2021
(Brazil)	Série D	6	2nd place (2011 and 2025)	2009	2025
(Brazil)	Copa do Brasil	28	Round of 16 (8 times)	1990	2023
	Copa Sudamericana	1	Round of 16 (2016)	2016	

=== Top scorers ===
This is a list of Santa Cruz's top scorers with over 100 goals.

Santa Cruz Football Club's top scorers
(Brazil) 1. Tará	207
(Brazil) 2. Luciano Veloso	174
(Brazil) 3. Ramón	148
(Brazil) 4. Betinho	143
(Brazil) 5. Fernando Santana	123
(Brazil) 6. Elói de Paula	115
(Brazil) 7. Siduca	105

=== Most appearances ===
This is a list of Santa Cruz players with more than 300 matches.

Most appearances for Santa Cruz Futebol Clube
(Brazil) 1. Givanildo Oliveira	599
(Brazil) 2. Luciano Veloso	409
(Brazil) 3. Ramón	377
(Brazil) 4. Fernando Santana	360
(Brazil) 5. Pedrinho	342

== Players ==
=== Current squad ===
As of 4 October 2026

Note: Flags indicate national team as defined under FIFA eligibility rules; some limited exceptions apply. Players may hold more than one non-FIFA nationality.

No.	Pos.	Nation	Player
1	GK	BRA	Thiago Coelho
2	DF	BRA	Thiago Ennes
3	DF	BRA	Eurico
4	DF	BRA	William Alves (captain)
5	MF	BRA	Pedro Favela
6	DF	BRA	Alex Ruan
7	MF	BRA	Fabinho
8	MF	BRA	Arilson
9	FW	BRA	Matheus Cadorini (on loan from Portuguesa)
10	FW	BRA	Cassiano Bouzon
11	MF	BRA	Matheus Melo
12	GK	BRA	Rokenedy
13	DF	BRA	Matheus Vinícius
15	MF	BRA	Andrey

No.	Pos.	Nation	Player
17	FW	BRA	Ronald
18	MF	BRA	Willian Júnior (on loan from Gama-DF)
19	FW	BRA	Renato
20	MF	BRA	Patrick Allan
23	FW	BRA	Tiago Marques
25	GK	BRA	Gabriel Souza
26	MF	BRA	Silva
28	FW	BRA	Eron
29	FW	BRA	Alex Sandro
31	DF	BRA	Zé Mário
32	MF	BRA	João Pedro
37	FW	BRA	Everaldo
60	DF	BRA	Rodrigues

== Local rivals ==
Santa Cruz has two major rivals within the city of Recife:

=== Clássico das Multidões ===
==== Sport ====
Clássico das Multidões is the name given to the football rivalry between Santa Cruz Futebol Clube and Sport Club do Recife, two of the most prominent clubs in the state of Pernambuco, Brazil. The matchup is one of the most traditional derbies in Northeastern and Brazilian football, known for its large crowds, intense competition, and passionate fan involvement.

The term "Clássico das Multidões" ("Derby of the Multitudes") originated from the historical ability of both teams to draw massive attendances to stadiums, especially the Estádio do Arruda and the Ilha do Retiro. The encounters are significant in state competitions such as the Campeonato Pernambucano, and have also taken place in national tournaments, including the Campeonato Brasileiro and the Copa do Nordeste.

The first match between Santa Cruz and Sport was played on 6 May 1917, with Sport winning 2–0. Since then, the rivalry has become one of the most balanced in the region, with hundreds of matches played over the decades. The derby is often decisive, featuring championship finals and matches that determined promotions or relegations in national leagues.

The biggest goal difference in the Clássico das Multidões occurred in the 1934 Campeonato Pernambucano, when Santa Cruz thrashed Sport 7–0.

Last update: Santa Cruz 0–2 Sport, 15 March 2025.

Rival	G	V	D	L	GF	GA
Sport	571	173	166	239	678	738

=== Náutico ===
Clássico das Emoções is the name given to the football rivalry between Santa Cruz Futebol Clube and Clube Náutico Capibaribe, two of the most traditional clubs in the state of Pernambuco, Brazil. The matchup is one of the oldest and most balanced derbies in Northeastern football, known for its intensity and unpredictable outcomes.

The nickname "Clássico das Emoções" ("Derby of Emotions") reflects the dramatic nature of the encounters, which are often decided by small margins and frequently feature tense, high-stakes moments for both sets of supporters. Matches are usually played at the Estádio do Arruda or the Estádio dos Aflitos, drawing large crowds and carrying significant weight in the Campeonato Pernambucano, as well as in national competitions such as the Campeonato Brasileiro and the Copa do Nordeste.

The first match took place on 29 June 1917, with Santa Cruz winning 3–0 in a charity tournament match played at Estádio dos Aflitos. The 100th Campeonato Pernambucano also marked the 500th time this classic match was played, resulting in a 5–3 victory for Santa Cruz.

Last update: Náutico 2–1 Santa Cruz, 25 January 2025.

Rival	G	V	D	L	GF	GA
Náutico	535	203	159	173	829	741

== Notable players ==
- Rivaldo
- Grafite
- Barbosa
- Givanildo Oliveira
- Levir Culpi
- Nunes
- Ramón
- Ricardo Rocha
- Zequinha
- Renatinho
- Tiago Cardoso
- Henágio
- Dênis Marques
- Flávio Caça-Rato
- Keno

== Notable coaches ==
- (Uruguay) Ricardo Diéz (1959)
- (Brazil) Evaristo de Macedo (1972)
- (Brazil) Paulo Emilio (1973, 1975)
- (Brazil) Ênio Andrade (1977)
- (Brazil) Evaristo de Macedo (1977–79)
- (Brazil) Paulo Emilio (1980)
- (Brazil) Carlos Alberto Silva (1983–84)
- (Brazil) Lori Sandri (1984)
- (Brazil) Paulinho de Almeida (1987)
- (Brazil) Moisés (1987)
- (Brazil) Abel Braga (1987–88)
- (Brazil) Givanildo Oliveira (1989–90)
- (Brazil) Valmir Louruz (1994)
- (Brazil) Péricles Chamusca (1996)
- (Brazil) Givanildo Oliveira (1998–99)
- (Brazil) Otacílio Gonçalves (1999–02)
- (Brazil) Heron Ferreira (2002)
- (Brazil) Péricles Chamusca (2002–04)
- (Brazil) Roberval Davino (2004)
- (Brazil) Givanildo Oliveira (2004–06), (2006)
- (Brazil) Valdir Espinosa (2006)
- (Brazil) René Simões (2006)
- (Brazil) Giba (2006)
- (Brazil) Evaristo de Macedo (2007)
- (Brazil) Mauro Fernandes (2007)
- (Brazil) Ricardo Rocha (2008)
- (Brazil) Márcio Bittencourt (2008–09)
- (Brazil) Dado Cavalcanti (2009–10)
- (Brazil) Lori Sandri (2010)
- (Brazil) Givanildo Oliveira (2010)
- (Brazil) Zé Teodoro (2011–12)
- (Brazil) Marcelo Martelotte (2013)
- (Brazil) Vica (2013–14)
- (Brazil) Sérgio Guedes (2014)
- (Brazil) Ricardinho (2015)
- (Brazil) Marcelo Martelotte (2015–16)
- (Brazil) Milton Mendes (2016)
- (Brazil) Doriva (2016)
- (Brazil) Vinícius Eutrópio (2017)
- (Brazil) Givanildo Oliveira (2017)
- (Brazil) Marcelo Martelotte (2017)

== Other modalities ==
=== American Football ===
The Santa Cruz Pirates, formerly known as the Recife Pirates, is the American football team of Santa Cruz Futebol Clube. The team is the champion of the 2018 Taça das Cidades, the 2018 Liga Nordestina, and the 2019 Pernambuco Bowl.

=== Futsal ===
Santa Cruz's history with futsal dates back to the 1960s. William Ribeiro was responsible for introducing the sport to Santa Cruz, winning the Pernambuco Futsal Championship with the club in 1960. The club also has youth teams starting with the under-7s. The under-15 team was twice Campeonato Pernambucano de Futsal champion, beating Sport in the first leg at Ilha do Retiro by 1–2 and in the second leg by 4–0 at Arrudinha. Santa also won championships with its under-7, under-8, under-9, under-10, under-11, and under-12 teams at the Festival HD Esportes de Futsal.

=== Bowling ===
Bowling is one of the newest sports announced by Santa Cruz. The team consists of Niltinho Farias, Alcindo Marsaro, Ivan Neto, Nelson Tachibana, Edson Pontual, Edson Pontual Júnior, and Guilherme Caminha. In 2018, Santa won the Pernambuco Individual Bowling Championship title, with Edson Pontual, Guilherme Caminha, and Niltinho Farias standing out.

=== E-sports ===
In 2018, Santa Cruz partnered with a local team and expanded its activities into e-sports. The club competes in EA FC, specifically in the 11v11 Pro Clubs mode, and has already achieved significant results, including winning the Copa do Nordeste (SUPER VS), finishing as 2nd place in Brasileiro Série A (Conexão FIFA), 2nd place in Brasileiro Série B (Clanbase), and securing 8th place in the Brasileirão Série A (EFA).

== Uniforms ==
Home colours: Shirt with red, white, and black stripes, black shorts, and black socks;

Awaay colours: White shirt with a black and red stripe across the chest, white shorts, and white socks;

Third colours: It changes every year;

Home colours	Away colours	Third colours

== Sponsors ==
Master Sponsorship

Período	Empresa
2025	(Brazil) Bet Dá Sorte
2024	(Brazil) Esportes da Sorte
2022–2023	(Brazil) BetNacional
2021	without sponsorship
2020	(Brazil) Estadium Bet
2019	(Brazil) Infinity Bet
2018	(Brazil) Transwinter
2016–2017	(Brazil) MRV Engenharia
2015	(Brazil) Imecap Hair
2015	(Brazil) Jairo Rocha
2010–2014	(Brazil) Votorantim
2009	(Brazil) Primor
2005–2008	(Brazil) Minasgás
2004	(France) Quartzolit
2001–2002	(Brazil) Peixe
1999–2001	(Brazil) Telemar
1998	(Brazil) Excelsior Seguros
1995–1997	(Italy) Parmalat
1994	(United States) Coca-Cola
1989–1993	(Brazil) Banorte
1988	(United States) Coca-Cola
1986–1987	(Brazil) Banorte

Sports Equipment

Período	Fornecedor
2026–present	(United States) Reebok
2022–2025	(Brazil) Volt Sport
2017–2021	(Brazil) Cobra Coral (own brand)
2009–2017	(Brazil) Penalty
2008	(Brazil) Champs
1998–2007	(Brazil) Finta
1997–1998	(Italy) Diadora
1995–1997	(Brazil) Rhumell
1994–1995	(Brazil) Amddma
1991–1993	(Brazil) CCS
1983–1990	(Germany) Adidas
