= 2013 Campeonato Baiano =

Campeonato Baiano de Futebol
- Season: 2013
- Champions: Vitória
- Relegated: Fluminense de Feira; Atlético Alagoinhas
- Copa do Brasil: Vitória; Juazeiro
- Série D: Juazeirense
- Copa do Nordeste: Vitória; Bahia; Vitória da Conquista
- Matches: 73
- Goals: 182 (2.49 per match)
- Top goalscorer: Rômulo (Bahia de Feira) - 13 goals

The 2013 Campeonato Baiano de Futebol was the 109th season of Bahia's top professional football league. The competition began on January 20 and ended on May 19. Vitória won the championship by the 27th time, while Fluminense de Feira and Atlético Alagoinhas were relegated.

== Format ==
The championship has three stages. On the first stage, all teams except those who are playing in the 2013 Copa do Nordeste play a single round-robin. The best five teams qualifies to the second stage. Also, the best team in this stage qualifies to the 2014 Copa do Nordeste, and the second best qualifies to the 2014 Copa do Brasil. The two worst teams in this stage are relegated.

On the second stage, the teams are joined by the clubs from Bahia who were playing in Copa do Nordeste. The teams are put in two groups. The clubs from each group faces all clubs in the other group. The two best teams in each group qualify to the Final stage. In the final stage, it's a playoff with four teams.

The best team who is not in Campeonato Brasileiro Série A, Série B or Série C qualifies to Série D. The champion also qualifies to the 2014 Copa do Brasil.

== Participating teams ==
Club	Home city	2012 result
Atlético de Alagoinhas	Alagoinhas	6th
Bahia	Salvador	1st
Bahia de Feira	Feira de Santana	5th
Botafogo de Salvador	Salvador	1st (2nd division)
Feirense	Feira de Santana	3rd
Fluminense de Feira	Feira de Santana	9th
Jacuipense	Riachão do Jacuípe	2nd (2nd division)
Juazeiro	Juazeiro	7th
Juazeirense	Juazeiro	8th
Serrano	Vitória da Conquista	10th
Vitória	Salvador	2nd
Vitória da Conquista	Vitória da Conquista	4th

== First stage ==
Pos	Team	Pld	W	D	L	GF	GA	GD	Pts	Qualification or relegation
1	Vitória da Conquista (A)	8	5	2	1	16	5	+11	17	Advances to the Second stage
2	Juazeiro (A)	8	4	2	2	11	4	+7	14	Advances to the Second stage
3	Bahia de Feira (A)	8	3	4	1	10	7	+3	13	Advances to the Second stage
4	Botafogo de Salvador (A)	8	2	4	2	12	10	+2	10	Advances to the Second stage
5	Juazeirense (A)	8	2	4	2	8	11	−3	10	Advances to the Second stage
6	Jacuipense	8	2	3	3	10	13	−3	9	
7	Serrano	8	2	3	3	8	11	−3	9	
8	Fluminense de Feira (R)	8	2	2	4	4	9	−5	8	Relegated
9	Atlético de Alagoinhas (R)	8	1	2	5	7	16	−9	5	Relegated

(A) Advance to a further round; (R) Relegated

=== Results ===
Home \ Away	ATL	BAF	BOT	FLU	JAC	JUA	JSE	SER	VCO
Atlético de Alagoinhas			2–1				0–1	1–2	1–3
Bahia de Feira	2–1			2–0			1–1		1–1
Botafogo de Salvador		1–2		3–1	1–1			3–1	
Fluminense de Feira	0–0						0–1	0–0	1–3
Jacuipense	2–2	2–1		0–1		0–1			
Juazeiro	5–0	0–0	1–1	0–1					
Juazeirense			1–1		3–3	0–3		1–1	
Serrano		1–1			1–2	2–0			0–3
Vitória da Conquista			1–1		3–0	0–1	2–0		

Legend: Blue = home team win; Yellow = draw; Red = away team win.

== Second stage ==
Teams from each group face the teams in the other group twice.

=== Group 1 ===
Pos	Team	Pld	W	D	L	GF	GA	GD	Pts	Qualification
1	Juazeiro (A)	8	3	1	4	6	10	−4	10	Advances to the Final stage
2	Bahia (A)	8	1	5	2	8	11	−3	8	Advances to the Final stage
3	Botafogo de Salvador	8	1	1	6	4	18	−14	4	
4	Feirense	8	1	0	7	6	14	−8	3	

Rules for classification: 1) points; 2) goal difference; 3) number of goals scored.
(A) Advance to a further round

=== Group 2 ===
Pos	Team	Pld	W	D	L	GF	GA	GD	Pts	Qualification
1	Juazeirense (A)	8	6	1	1	13	3	+10	19	Advances to the Final stage
2	Vitória (A)	8	6	0	2	17	7	+10	18	Advances to the Final stage
3	Bahia de Feira	8	4	3	1	15	6	+9	15	
4	Vitória da Conquista	8	3	3	2	8	8	0	12	

Rules for classification: 1) points; 2) goal difference; 3) number of goals scored.
(A) Advance to a further round

=== Results ===
Home \ Away	BAH	BOT	FEI	JUA	BAF	JSE	VIT	VCO
Bahia					0–0	2–0	1–5	1–1
Botafogo de Salvador					1–2	0–3	1–0	0–0
Feirense					3–1	0–2	1–2	0–1
Juazeiro					0–3	1–4	0–1	1–0
Bahia de Feira	2–2	6–0	1–0	0–0				
Juazeirense	0–0	2–0	1–0	1–0				
Vitória	2–1	3–1	4–1	0–1				
Vitória da Conquista	1–1	2–1	2–1	1–3				

Legend: Blue = home team win; Yellow = draw; Red = away team win.

== Final stage ==
Semifinals
Juazeirense	0	2	2
Vitória	4	0	4
Juazeiro	0	0	0
Bahia	2	1	3

Finals
Vitória	7	1	8
Bahia	3	1	4

=== Semifinals ===
==== First leg ====
May 1, 2013
16:00 UTC−03:00

Bahia	2–0	Juazeiro
Zé Roberto 09'; Pablo 27'	Report

Itaipava Arena Fonte Nova, Salvador
Attendance: 6,848
Referee: Marcelo de Lima Henrique

May 2, 2013
20:30 UTC−03:00

Vitória	4–0	Juazeirense
Dinei 01'; Maxi Biancucchi 39'; Vander 82'; Marquinhos 88'	Report

Barradão, Salvador
Attendance: 8,167
Referee: Wilton Sampaio

==== Second leg ====
May 4, 2013
18:30 UTC−03:00

Juazeiro	0–1	Bahia
	Report	Talisca 45'

Adautão, Juazeiro
Attendance: 2,129
Referee: Wilson Luiz Seneme

May 5, 2013
16:00 UTC−03:00

Juazeirense	2–0	Vitória
Deon 42'; Madson 90+2'	Report

Adautão, Juazeiro
Attendance: 943
Referee: Ricardo Marques Ribeiro

=== Third-place play-off ===
May 9, 2013
16:00 UTC−03:00

Juazeiro	0–1	Juazeirense
	Report	Waguinho 27'

Adautão, Juazeiro
Attendance: 176
Referee: Moarcy Sobrinho Andrade Cruz

May 12, 2013
16:00 UTC−03:00

Juazeirense	1–2	Juazeiro
Deon 45'	Report	Jean 23'; Jarbas 72'

Adautão, Juazeiro
Attendance: 127
Referee: Reinaldo Silva de Santana

=== Finals ===
May 12, 2013
16:00 UTC−03:00

Bahia	3–7	Vitória
Fernandão 40' (pen.), 47'; Adriano 89'	Report	Gabriel Paulista 2'; Dinei 13', 46', 58', 90'; Fabrício 21'; Maxi Biancucchi 65'

Itaipava Arena Fonte Nova, Salvador
Attendance: 19,395
Referee: Marcelo de Lima Henrique

May 19, 2013
16:00 UTC−03:00

Vitória	1–1	Bahia
Dinei 19'	Report	Fernandão 65'

Barradão, Salvador
Attendance: 32,514
Referee: Wilson Luiz Seneme
