= 2019 Campeonato Baiano =

Campeonato Baiano
- Season: 2019
- Champions: Bahia
- Relegated: Jequié
- Copa do Brasil: Bahia; Bahia de Feira; Atlético de Alagoinhas
- Série D: Bahia de Feira; Atlético de Alagoinhas; Vitória da Conquista
- Copa do Nordeste: Bahia; Vitória; Juazeirense
- Matches played: 51
- Goals scored: 141 (2.76 per match)
- Top goalscorer: João Neto (Atlético de Alagoinhas) - 8 goals

The 2019 Campeonato Baiano de Futebol was the 115th edition of Bahia's top professional football league. The competition began on 19 January and ended on 21 April. Bahia won the championship for the 48th time.

== First phase ==
Pos	Team	Pld	W	D	L	GF	GA	GD	Pts	Qualification or relegation
1	Bahia de Feira	9	4	4	1	18	12	+6	16	Qualified to Semifinals
2	Atlético de Alagoinhas	9	4	4	1	19	14	+5	16	Qualified to Semifinals
3	Bahia	9	4	3	2	19	6	+13	15	Qualified to Semifinals
4	Vitória da Conquista	9	4	1	4	12	14	−2	13	Qualified to Semifinals
5	Vitória	9	3	4	2	12	9	+3	13	
6	Fluminense de Feira	9	3	3	3	8	8	0	12	
7	Jacuipense	9	3	1	5	11	14	−3	10	
8	Juazeirense	9	2	4	3	11	16	−5	10	
9	Jacobina	9	2	2	5	9	16	−7	8	
10	Jequié	9	1	4	4	10	20	−10	7	Relegated

Updated to match(es) played on March 17, 2019. Source: RSSSF.com
Rules for classification: 1) points; 2) wins; 3) goal difference; 4) number of goals scored.

== Semifinals ==
Team 1	Agg.	Team 2	1st leg	2nd leg
Vitória da Conquista	2–3	Bahia de Feira	1–1	1–2
Bahia	5–0	Atlético de Alagoinhas	3–0	2–0

== Finals ==
April 14, 2019
16:00 UTC−4

Bahia de Feira	1–1	Bahia
Bruninho 27'		Rogério 90+7'

Estádio Joia da Princesa, Feira de Santana
Attendance: 5,781
Referee: Ricardo Marques

April 21, 2019
16:00 UTC−4

Bahia	1-0	Bahia de Feira
Gilberto 53'

Arena Fonte Nova, Salvador
Attendance: 41,413
Referee: Luiz Flávio de Oliveira

Bahia won 2–1 on aggregate.
