= 2008 Campeonato Baiano =

The Campeonato Baiano 2008 is the 104th edition of the Campeonato Baiano. Vitória won the competition.

== Format ==
First stage:

The 12 teams play in double round-robin in 22 rounds. The top 4 qualify for the Final Stage, the bottom team is relegated.

Final stage:

The 4 teams play in double round-robin in 6 rounds. The winners of Final Stage is the champions. The top 3 teams (except the clubs of Série A and Série B) qualify for the Série C.

== Participating teams ==
- Atlético-BA
- Bahia
- Camaçari
- Colo-Colo
- Feirense
- Fluminense de Feira

- Ipitanga
- Itabuna
- Juazeiro
- Poções
- Vitória
- Vitória da Conquista

== Standings ==
Campeonato Baiano League Table, 2008

P	Team	Pts	G	W	D	L	GF	GA	GD	%
1	Bahia	50	22	15	5	2	38	13	25	75,8
2	Vitória da Conquista	48	22	15	3	4	45	26	19	72,7
3	Vitória	42	22	13	3	6	50	28	22	63,6
4	Itabuna	35	22	9	8	5	34	32	2	53,0
5	Atlético-BA	34	22	10	4	8	33	28	5	51,5
6	Colo-Colo	34	22	10	4	8	25	22	3	51,5
7	Ipitanga	28	22	8	4	10	32	35	-3	42,4
8	Feirense	28	22	7	7	8	30	28	2	42,4
9	Camaçari	22	22	5	7	10	27	39	-12	33,3
10	Fluminense de Feira *	16	22	4	10	8	30	35	-5	24,2
11	Poções	13	22	3	4	15	17	42	-25	19,7
12	Juazeiro	9	22	2	3	17	20	53	-33	13,6

P - position; Pts – points earned; G – games played; W - matches won; D - matches drawn; L - matches lost;
GF – goals for; GA – goals against; GD – goal difference; % - Percentage points achieved

Advance to the final stage of Campeonato Baiano 2008
Relegated to the Série B 2008

* For offending the referee, Fluminense de Feira was punished with the loss of 6 points.

== Final stage ==
=== Final standings ===
Team		Pts	G	W	D	L	GF	GA	GD
1	Vitória	10	6	3	1	2	16	13	3
2	Bahia	10	6	3	1	2	11	8	3
3	Vitória da Conquista	8	6	2	2	2	12	14	-2
4	Itabuna	6	6	2	0	4	8	12	-4
P - position; Pts – points earned; G – games played; W - matches won; D - matches drawn; L - matches lost; GF – goals for; GA – goals against; GD – goal difference

=== First Three Matches ===
Round	Date	Home team	Score	Away team
1st	April 6, 2008	Vitória da Conquista	0 - 0	Bahia
1st	April 6, 2008	Itabuna	0 - 1	Vitória
2nd	April 13, 2008	Bahia	2 - 1	Itabuna
2nd	April 13, 2008	Vitória	5 - 5	Vitória da Conquista
3rd	April 20, 2008	Vitória	1 - 4	Bahia
3rd	April 20, 2008	Vitória da Conquista	2 - 0	Itabuna

=== Second Three Matches ===
Round	Date	Home team	Score	Away team
4th	April 26, 2008	Itabuna	3 - 2	Vitória da Conquista
4th	April 27, 2008	Bahia	0 - 3	Vitória
5th	May 1, 2008	Vitória da Conquista	3 - 1	Vitória
5th	May 1, 2008	Itabuna	3 - 0	Bahia
6th	May 4, 2008	Bahia	5 - 0	Vitória da Conquista
6th	May 4, 2008	Vitória	5 - 1	Itabuna

Campeonato Baiano
2008 Winners
Vitória
24th Title
