= Copa Governador do Estado da Bahia =

- Organiser(s): Federação Baiana de Futebol
- Founded: 1998
- Abolished: 2016
- Region: Bahia, Brazil
- Qualifier for: Copa do Brasil
- Related competitions: Campeonato Baiano
- Most championships: Vitória da Conquista (5 titles)

The Copa Governador do Estado da Bahia (previously Taça Estado da Bahia) was a tournament organized by Federação Baiana de Futebol in order to decide which club would represent the Brazilian state of Bahia at the Copa do Brasil.

== List of champions ==
=== Taça Estado da Bahia ===
Season	Champions	Runners-up
1998	Fluminense de Feira (1)	Bahia de Feira
1999	Camaçari (1)	Catuense
2000	Bahia (1)	Catuense
2001	Catuense (1)	Vitória
2002	Bahia (2)	Vitória
2003	Palmeiras do Nordeste (1)	Cruzeiro
2004	Vitória (1)	Bahia
2005	Vitória (2)	Ipitanga
2006	Vitória (3)	Bahia
2007	Bahia (3)	Fluminense de Feira
2008	Not held	

=== Copa Governador do Estado da Bahia ===
Season	Champions	Runners-up
2009	Fluminense de Feira (2)	Vitória da Conquista
2010	Vitória da Conquista (1)	Atlético de Alagoinhas
2011	Vitória da Conquista (2)	Atlético de Alagoinhas
2012	Vitória da Conquista (3)	Jacuipense
2013	Bahia de Feira (1)	Vitória da Conquista
2014	Vitória da Conquista (4)	Jacuipense
2015	Fluminense de Feira (3)	Juazeirense
2016	Vitória da Conquista (5)	Jacobina

== Titles by team ==
Teams in bold stills active.

Rank	Club	Winners	Winning years
1	**Vitória da Conquista**	5	2010, 2011, 2012, 2014, 2016
2	**Bahia**	3	2000, 2002, 2007
2	**Fluminense de Feira**	3	1998, 2009, 2015
2	**Vitória**	3	2004, 2005, 2006
5	**Bahia de Feira**	1	2013
5	**Camaçari**	1	1999
5	Catuense	1	2001
5	Palmeiras do Nordeste	1	2003

=== By city ===
City	Championships	Clubs
Salvador	6	Bahia (3), Vitória (3)
Feira de Santana	5	Fluminense de Feira (3), Bahia de Feira (1), Palmeiras do Nordeste (1)
Vitória da Conquista	5	Vitória da Conquista (5)
Camaçari	1	Camaçari (1)
Catu	1	Catuense (1)
