= Deon (footballer) =

Brazilian footballer (1987–2023)

- Deon with Bahia de Feira

Personal information
- Full name: José Aldean Oliveira de Jesus
- Date of birth: 6 June 1987
- Place of birth: Itapicuru, Brazil
- Date of death: 9 August 2023 (aged 36)
- Place of death: Feira de Santana, Brazil
- Height: 1.77 m (5 ft 10 in)
- Position: Forward

Youth career
- –2005: Bahia

Senior career*
Years	Team	Apps	(Gls)
2005–2008	Bahia	11	(4)
2009	Fluminense de Feira		
2009	Palmeiras B		
2010	Fluminense de Feira		
2011	Vila Nova		
2011–2012	Atlético de Alagoinhas		
2012	Tupi		
2013–2014	Juazeirense		
2014	Atlético de Alagoinhas		
2015	Serrano-BA		
2015–2016	Fluminense de Feira		
2016	Atlético de Alagoinhas		
2017	Flamengo de Guanambi		
2017	Jacobina		
2018–2023	Bahia de Feira	123	(39)
- * Club domestic league appearances and goals

José Aldean Oliveira de Jesus (6 June 1987 – 9 August 2023), better known as Deon, was a Brazilian professional footballer who played as a forward.

== Career ==
Deon played for Bahia between 2005 and 2008, playing 11 matches and scoring 4 goals during the period. He subsequently played for Fluminense de Feira and Atlético de Alagoinhas. He arrived at Bahia de Feira in 2018, where he played 123 matches and scored 39 goals. He was runner-up in Bahia de Feira in 2019 and 2021 editions of Campeonato Baiano.

== Death ==
On 9 August 2023, Deon fell ill during a training session held at Arena Cajueiro, Feira de Santana. Paramedics confirmed the player's death at the scene.

== See also ==
- List of association football players who died during their careers

== See also ==
- List of association footballers who died while playing
