= 2001 Campeonato Brasileiro Série C =

Campeonato Brasileiro Série C
- Season: 2001
- Champions: Etti Jundiaí
- Promoted: Etti Jundiaí; Mogi Mirim; Guarany de Sobral
- Matches: 412
- Goals: 1,127 (2.74 per match)
- Top goalscorer: 14 goals: Rodrigo Ayres (Atlético-GO); Edmílson (Brasiliense); Jean Carlos (Etti Jundiaí)
- Biggest home win: Juazeiro 7-0 Cachoeiro (October 21, 2001)
- Biggest away win: Guarabira 0-6 São Gonçalo (October 24, 2001)

The football (soccer) Campeonato Brasileiro Série C 2001, the third level of Brazilian National League, was played from September 8 to December 15, 2001. The competition had 65 clubs and two of them were promoted to Série B.

Etti Jundiaí finished the final phase group with most points and was declared 2001 Brazilian Série C champions, claiming the promotion to the 2002 Série B along with Mogi Mirim, the runners-up. the third-placed team, Guarany de Sobral, was also promoted after Malutrom withdrew from the 2002 Série B.

== Stages of the competition ==
=== First stage ===
Group A (AC-AP-AM-PA-RO-RR)

Pos	Team	Pld	W	D	L	GF	GA	GD	Pts	Qualification
1	(Amapá) Ypiranga-AP	12	7	2	3	20	14	+6	23	Qualified for the second stage
2	(Roraima) Rio Negro-RR	12	5	6	1	18	10	+8	21	Qualified for the second stage
3	(Pará) Águia de Marabá	12	5	4	3	18	14	+4	19	
4	(Amazonas (Brazilian state)) Rio Negro-AM	12	5	2	5	28	22	+6	17	
5	(Pará) Tiradentes-PA	12	4	3	5	22	17	+5	15	
6	(Acre (state)) Andirá	12	4	2	6	15	19	−4	14	
7	(Rondônia) Genus	12	2	1	9	13	38	−25	7	

Source: rsssf.com

Group B (CE-MA-PI-TO)

Pos	Team	Pld	W	D	L	GF	GA	GD	Pts	Qualification
1	(Ceará) Guarany de Sobral	10	7	2	1	15	7	+8	23	Qualified for the second stage
2	(Ceará) Ferroviário-CE	10	7	2	1	12	3	+9	23	Qualified for the second stage
3	(Piauí) River	10	5	2	3	20	14	+6	17	
4	(Maranhão) Caxiense	10	3	1	6	7	16	−9	10	
5	(Tocantins) Tocantinópolis	10	2	2	6	16	19	−3	8	
6	(Maranhão) Moto Club	10	0	3	7	5	16	−11	3	

Source: rsssf.com

Group C (PB-RN)

Pos	Team	Pld	W	D	L	GF	GA	GD	Pts	Qualification
1	(Paraíba) Treze	10	6	3	1	18	8	+10	21	Qualified for the second stage
2	(Rio Grande do Norte) São Gonçalo	10	5	4	1	16	6	+10	19	Qualified for the second stage
3	(Rio Grande do Norte) Coríntians	10	5	4	1	16	9	+7	19	
4	(Paraíba) Guarabira	10	2	4	4	11	23	−12	10	
5	(Paraíba) Botafogo-PB	10	1	3	6	8	13	−5	6	
6	(Paraíba) Atlético Cajazeirense	10	1	2	7	12	22	−10	5	

Source: rsssf.com

Group D (AL-PE-SE)

Pos	Team	Pld	W	D	L	GF	GA	GD	Pts	Qualification
1	(Alagoas) Corinthians-AL	10	6	0	4	21	21	0	18	Qualified for the second stage
2	(Sergipe) Confiança	10	5	2	3	14	11	+3	17	Qualified for the second stage
3	(Alagoas) ASA	10	5	0	5	14	15	−1	15	
4	(Pernambuco) Central	10	4	2	4	16	12	+4	14	
5	(Alagoas) CSA	10	4	0	6	13	16	−3	12	
6	(Sergipe) Itabaiana	10	3	2	5	17	20	−3	11	

Source: rsssf.com

Group E (DF-GO-MT-MS)

Pos	Team	Pld	W	D	L	GF	GA	GD	Pts	Qualification
1	(Federal District (Brazil)) Brasiliense	12	9	2	1	29	10	+19	29	Qualified for the second stage
2	(Goiás) Atlético Goianiense	12	5	6	1	13	8	+5	21	Qualified for the second stage
3	(Mato Grosso do Sul) CENE	12	5	3	4	20	17	+3	18	
4	(Goiás) Goiânia	12	4	4	4	10	14	−4	16	
5	(Mato Grosso) União Rondonópolis	12	3	2	7	6	18	−12	11	
6	(Mato Grosso do Sul) Comercial-MS	12	2	5	5	11	12	−1	11	
7	(Goiás) Real-GO	12	2	2	8	13	23	−10	8	

Source: rsssf.com

Group F (BA-ES)

Pos	Team	Pld	W	D	L	GF	GA	GD	Pts	Qualification
1	(Bahia) Juazeiro	10	7	1	2	28	13	+15	22	Qualified for the second stage
2	(Bahia) Independente-BA	10	6	1	3	17	9	+8	19	Qualified for the second stage
3	(Bahia) Catuense	10	5	1	4	13	13	0	16	
4	(Bahia) Colo Colo-BA	10	3	3	4	12	14	−2	12	
5	(Espírito Santo) Estrela do Norte	10	2	2	6	8	15	−7	8	
6	(Espírito Santo) Cachoeiro	10	1	4	5	8	22	−14	7	

Source: rsssf.com

Group G (RJ-SP)

Pos	Team	Pld	W	D	L	GF	GA	GD	Pts	Qualification
1	(São Paulo (state)) Etti Jundiaí	12	8	2	2	22	9	+13	26	Qualified for the second stage
2	(Rio de Janeiro (state)) Madureira	12	8	1	3	19	9	+10	25	Qualified for the second stage
3	(São Paulo (state)) Santo André	12	7	2	3	20	11	+9	23	
4	(São Paulo (state)) Atlético Sorocaba	12	4	3	5	15	18	−3	15	
5	(Rio de Janeiro (state)) Olaria	12	4	2	6	11	16	−5	14	
6	(Rio de Janeiro (state)) América-RJ	12	2	3	7	7	21	−14	9	
7	(Rio de Janeiro (state)) Bangu	12	2	1	9	9	19	−10	7	

Source: rsssf.com

Group H (MG)

Pos	Team	Pld	W	D	L	GF	GA	GD	Pts	Qualification
1	(Minas Gerais) Ipatinga	12	7	3	2	22	9	+13	24	Qualified for the second stage
2	(Minas Gerais) Uberlândia	12	7	3	2	20	13	+7	24	Qualified for the second stage
3	(Minas Gerais) Villa Nova	12	4	6	2	14	6	+8	18	
4	(Minas Gerais) Atlético de Três Corações	12	4	3	5	11	18	−7	15	
5	(Minas Gerais) Mamoré	12	2	6	4	14	19	−5	12	
6	(Minas Gerais) Tupi	12	2	5	5	13	17	−4	11	
7	(Minas Gerais) Uberaba	12	1	4	7	16	28	−12	7	

Source: rsssf.com

Group I (PR-RJ-SP)

Pos	Team	Pld	W	D	L	GF	GA	GD	Pts	Qualification
1	(São Paulo (state)) Mogi Mirim	10	6	2	2	14	10	+4	20	Qualified for the second stage
2	(Paraná (state)) União Bandeirante	10	5	3	2	18	15	+3	18	Qualified for the second stage
3	(Rio de Janeiro (state)) Friburguense	10	3	5	2	11	11	0	14	
4	(São Paulo (state)) Ituano	10	3	4	3	9	6	+3	13	
5	(São Paulo (state)) Rio Branco-SP	10	2	4	4	9	9	0	10	
6	(Rio de Janeiro (state)) Volta Redonda	10	1	2	7	7	17	−10	5	

Source: rsssf.com

Group J (PR-RS-SC)

Pos	Team	Pld	W	D	L	GF	GA	GD	Pts	Qualification
1	(Santa Catarina (state)) Tubarão	12	7	4	1	20	9	+11	25	Qualified for the second stage
2	(Rio Grande do Sul) Brasil de Pelotas	12	6	4	2	13	9	+4	22	Qualified for the second stage
3	(Paraná (state)) Iraty	12	5	4	3	21	18	+3	19	
4	(Rio Grande do Sul) São José-RS	12	4	3	5	14	18	−4	15	
5	(Rio Grande do Sul) Pelotas	12	3	5	4	11	12	−1	14	
6	(Rio Grande do Sul) Passo Fundo	12	2	4	6	8	17	−9	10	
7	(Santa Catarina (state)) Marcílio Dias	12	2	2	8	13	17	−4	8	

Source: rsssf.com

=== Second stage ===
Group 1 (AP-CE-PB-RR)

Pos	Team	Pld	W	D	L	GF	GA	GD	Pts	Qualification
1	(Ceará) Guarany de Sobral	4	2	1	1	8	6	+2	7	Qualified for the final stage
2	(Amapá) Ypiranga-AP	4	2	1	1	5	7	−2	7	
3	(Paraíba) Treze	4	1	3	0	7	3	+4	6	
4	(Roraima) Rio Negro-RR	4	1	1	2	5	7	−2	4	
5	(Ceará) Ferroviário-CE	4	0	2	2	3	5	−2	2	

Source: rsssf.com

Group 2 (AL-DF-GO-RN-SE)

Pos	Team	Pld	W	D	L	GF	GA	GD	Pts	Qualification
1	(Goiás) Atlético Goianiense	4	3	0	1	8	3	+5	9	Qualified for the final stage
2	(Alagoas) Corinthians-AL	4	3	0	1	6	6	0	9	
3	(Sergipe) Confiança	4	2	0	2	8	6	+2	6	
4	(Federal District (Brazil)) Brasiliense	4	2	0	2	6	7	−1	6	
5	(Rio Grande do Norte) São Gonçalo	4	0	0	4	5	11	−6	0	

Source: rsssf.com

Group 3 (BA-MG-RJ-SP)

Pos	Team	Pld	W	D	L	GF	GA	GD	Pts	Qualification
1	(São Paulo (state)) Etti Jundiaí	4	4	0	0	13	2	+11	12	Qualified for the final stage
2	(Bahia) Juazeiro	4	2	1	1	9	8	+1	7	
3	(Minas Gerais) Ipatinga	4	1	1	2	4	7	−3	4	
4	(Rio de Janeiro (state)) Madureira	4	1	1	2	6	10	−4	4	
5	(Bahia) Independente-BA	4	0	1	3	4	9	−5	1	

Source: rsssf.com

Group 4 (MG-PR-RS-SC-SP)

Pos	Team	Pld	W	D	L	GF	GA	GD	Pts	Qualification
1	(São Paulo (state)) Mogi Mirim	4	2	1	1	7	2	+5	7	Qualified for the final stage
2	(Paraná (state)) União Bandeirante	4	2	1	1	5	5	0	7	
3	(Santa Catarina (state)) Tubarão	4	2	0	2	6	8	−2	6	
4	(Rio Grande do Sul) Brasil de Pelotas	4	1	1	2	7	8	−1	4	
5	(Minas Gerais) Uberlândia	4	0	3	1	3	5	−2	3	

Source: rsssf.com

=== Final stage ===
Pos	Team	Pld	W	D	L	GF	GA	GD	Pts	ETJ	MGM	GSB	ACG
1	Etti Jundiaí (P)	6	4	2	0	13	7	+6	14		2–1	2–2	2–0
2	Mogi Mirim (P)	6	3	0	3	13	12	+1	9	1–3		3–0	1–0
3	Guarany de Sobral (P)	6	2	2	2	11	13	−2	8	1–1	5–3		2–1
4	Atlético Goianiense	6	1	0	5	8	13	−5	3	2–3	2–4	3–1	

Source: rsssf.com
(P) Promoted to Série B 2002

== Sources ==
- rsssf.com
