= Campeonato Baiano Second Division =

Football league in Brazil

- Organising body: FBF
- Founded: 1922; 104 years ago
- Country: Brazil
- State: Bahia
- Level on pyramid: 2
- Promotion to: Campeonato Baiano
- Current champions: Bahia de Feira (4th title) (2025)
- Most championships: Bahia de Feira (4)
- Website: FBF Official website

The Campeonato Baiano Second Division is the second tier of the professional state football league in the Brazilian state of Bahia state league. It is run by the Bahia Football Federation (FBF). Usually, the champions of a division are promoted in the next year to the immediately upper level.

== History ==
The Second Level of the Bahia State Championship is competed since 1922, and was not held from 1924 to 1934, in 1938, from 1942 to 1964, in 1966, in 1969, in 1970, from 1972 to 1974, from 1976 to 1980 and in 2005.

== List of champions ==
The table below shows the lower level champions of Baiano State Championship.

Season	Champions	Runners-up
1922	Auto Bahia (1)	Fluminense
1922	Auto Bahia (1)	Yankee
1923	Yankee (1)	Democrata
1924–1934	Not held	
1935	São Pedro (1)	Yankee
1936	Energia Circular (1)	São Pedro
1937	Energia Circular (2)	Maetinga EC
1938	Not held	
1939	Guarany (1)	Maetinga EC
1940	Energia Circular (3)	Jussari FC
1941	Bragança (1)	Baianópolis
1942–1964	Not held	
1965	Redenção (1)	Estrela de Março
1966	Not held	
1967	Internacional (1)	Jacuipense
1968	Redenção (2)	Ideal
1969	SMTC (1)	Colo Colo
1970	Not held	
1971	Palestra (1)	Unidos
1972–1974	Not held	
1975	Redenção (3)	Guarany
1976	Not held	
1977	Bancários da Bahia (1)	Atlético de Alagoinhas
1978–1980	Not held	
1981	Botafogo (SA) (1)	Bahia de Feira
1982	Bahia de Feira (1)	Ypiranga
1983	Ypiranga (1)	Atlético de Alagoinhas
1984	Bancários da Bahia (2)	Botafogo
1985	Galícia (1)	Botafogo (SA)
1986	Bahia de Feira (2)	Botafogo
1987	Atlanta (1)	São Cristóvão
1988	Galícia (2)	Estrela de Março
1989	Jacuipense (1)	Ypiranga
1990	Ypiranga (2)	Ilhéus
1991	Camaçari (1)	Leônico
1992	Jequié (1)	Real Serrinhense
1993	Poções (1)	Atlético de Alagoinhas
1994	Conquista (1)	Eunápolis
1995	São Francisco (1)	Jacuipense
1996	Juazeiro (1)	Grapiúna
1997	Camaçari (2)	Aliança
1998	Cruzeiro (1)	Atlético de Alagoinhas
1999	Colo Colo (1)	Fluminense de Feira
2000	Barreiras (1)	Jacuipense
2001	Palmeiras do Nordeste (1)	Grapiúna
2002	Itabuna (1)	Jacuipense
2003	Camaçariense (1)	Astro
2004	Ipitanga (1)	Guanambi
2005	Not held	
2006	Vitória da Conquista (1)	Jacuipense
2007	Feirense (1)	Galícia
2008	Madre de Deus (1)	Guanambi
2009	Bahia de Feira (3)	Juazeirense
2010	Juazeiro (2)	Serrano
2011	Juazeirense (1)	Itabuna
2012	Botafogo (1)	Jacuipense
2013	Galícia (3)	Catuense
2014	Colo Colo (2)	Jacobina
2015	Flamengo de Guanambi (1)	Fluminense de Feira
2016	Atlântico (1)	Portela
2017	Jequié (2)	Pituaçu
2018	Atlético de Alagoinhas (1)	Pituaçu
2019	Doce Mel (2)	Olímpia
2020	UNIRB (1)	Colo Colo
2021	Barcelona (1)	Botafogo
2022	Itabuna (2)	Jacobinense
2023	Jequié (3)	Jacobina
2024	Colo Colo (3)	Porto
2025	Bahia de Feira (4)	Galícia

Names change

- Atlanta is the currently Doce Mel.

== Titles by team ==
Teams in bold stills active.

Rank	Club	Winners	Winning years
1	**Bahia de Feira**	4	1982, 1986, 2009, 2025
2	**Colo Colo**	3	1999, 2014, 2024
2	Energia Circular	3	1936, 1937, 1940
2	**Galícia**	3	1985, 1988, 2013
2	**Jequié**	3	1992, 2017, 2023
2	Redenção	3	1941, 1968, 1975
7	Bancários da Bahia	2	1977, 1984
7	**Camaçari**	2	1991, 1997
7	**Doce Mel**	2	1987, 2019
7	**Itabuna**	2	2002, 2022
7	**Juazeiro**	2	1996, 2010
7	**Ypiranga**	2	1983, 1990
13	**Atlântico**	1	2016
13	**Atlético de Alagoinhas**	1	2018
13	Auto Bahia	1	1922
13	**Barcelona**	1	2021
13	Barreiras	1	2000
13	**Botafogo**	1	2012
13	Botafogo (SA)	1	1981
13	Bragança	1	1941
13	**Camaçariense**	1	2003
13	Conquista	1	1994
13	**Cruzeiro**	1	1998
13	**Feirense**	1	2007
13	**Flamengo de Guanambi**	1	2015
13	Guarany	1	1939
13	Internacional	1	1967
13	**Ipitanga**	1	2004
13	**Jacuipense**	1	1989
13	**Juazeirense**	1	2011
13	**Madre de Deus**	1	2008
13	Palestra	1	1971
13	Palmeiras do Nordeste	1	2001
13	Poções	1	1993
13	São Francisco	1	1995
13	São Pedro	1	1935
13	SMTC	1	1969
13	**UNIRB**	1	2020
13	**Vitória da Conquista**	1	2006
13	Yankee	1	1923

=== By city ===
City	Championships	Clubs
Salvador	21	Energia Circular (3), Galícia (3), Redenção (3), ABB (2), Ypiranga (2), Auto Bahia (1), Botafogo (1), Bragança (1), Guarany (1), Palestra (1), São Pedro (1), SMTC (1), Yankee (1)
Feira de Santana	6	Bahia de Feira (4), Feirense (1), Palmeiras do Nordeste (1)
Jequié	5	Jequié (3), Doce Mel (2)
Ilhéus	4	Colo Colo (3), Barcelona (1)
Camaçari	3	Camaçari (2), Camaçariense (1)
Juazeiro	3	Juazeiro (2), Juazeirense (1)
Alagoinhas	2	Atlético de Alagoinhas (1), UNIRB (1)
Itabuna	2	Itabuna (2)
Lauro de Freitas	2	Atlântico (1), Ipitanga (1)
São Francisco do Conde	2	Internacional (1), São Francisco (1)
Vitória da Conquista	2	Conquista (1), Vitória da Conquista (1)
Barreiras	1	Barreiras (1)
Cruz das Almas	1	Cruzeiro (1)
Guanambi	1	Flamengo (1)
Madre de Deus	1	Madre de Deus (1)
Poções	1	Poções (1)
Riachão do Jacuípe	1	Jacuipense (1)
Santo Amaro	1	Botafogo (1)

== See also ==
- Campeonato Baiano
- Campeonato Baiano Third Division
