= Marcone (footballer, born 1987) =

Brazilian footballer

Personal information
- Full name: Marcone Cena Cerqueira
- Date of birth: 12 September 1987 (age 39)
- Place of birth: Itabuna, Brazil
- Height: 1.80 m (5 ft 11 in)
- Position: Midfielder

Team information
- Current team: Grapiuna

Youth career
- 2005: Bahia

Senior career*
| Years | Team | Apps | (Gls) |
| 2005–2014 | Bahia | | |
| 2012–2013 | → São Caetano (loan) | | |
| 2013 | → Atlético Goianiense (loan) | | |
| 2014 | → Comercial–SP (loan) | | |
| 2014 | → Náutico (loan) | | |
| 2015 | Icasa | | |
| 2015 | Vitória da Conquista | | |
| 2016 | Atlético de Cajazeiras | | |
| 2016 | Galícia | | |
| 2017– | Doze | | |
- * Club domestic league appearances and goals as of 12 March 2017

Marcone Cena Cerqueira (born September 12, 1987), known as Marcone, is a Brazilian footballer who plays for Doze as midfielder.

== Career ==
Marcone began playing football with Esporte Clube Bahia. He was promoted to Bahia's senior squad in 2006, and made over 200 competitive appearances for the club.

== Career statistics ==
As of 12 March 2017

| Club | Season | League | | | State League | | Cup | | Conmebol | | Other | | Total | |
| Club | Season | Division | Apps | Goals | Apps | Goals | Apps | Goals | Apps | Goals | Apps | Goals | Apps | Goals |
|---|---|---|---|---|---|---|---|---|---|---|---|---|---|---|
| Bahia | 2008 | Série B | 32 | 0 | — | | 1 | 0 | — | | — | | 33 | 0 |
| Bahia | 2009 | Série B | 14 | 0 | 12 | 1 | 1 | 0 | — | | — | | 27 | 1 |
| Bahia | 2010 | Série B | 22 | 0 | 17 | 1 | 3 | 0 | — | | — | | 42 | 1 |
| Bahia | 2011 | Série A | 18 | 1 | 15 | 3 | 6 | 0 | — | | — | | 39 | 4 |
| Bahia | Subtotal | | 54 | 1 | 44 | 5 | 10 | 0 | — | | — | | 108 | 6 |
| São Caetano | 2012 | Série B | 17 | 2 | 11 | 1 | — | | — | | — | | 28 | 3 |
| São Caetano | 2013 | Série B | — | | 5 | 0 | — | | — | | — | | 5 | 0 |
| São Caetano | Subtotal | | 17 | 2 | 16 | 1 | — | | — | | — | | 33 | 3 |
| Atlético Goianiense | 2013 | Série B | 3 | 0 | — | | 0 | 0 | — | | — | | 3 | 0 |
| Comercial–SP | 2014 | Paulista | — | | 9 | 0 | — | | — | | — | | 9 | 0 |
| Náutico | 2014 | Série B | 5 | 0 | — | | — | | — | | — | | 5 | 0 |
| Icasa | 2015 | Série C | 5 | 0 | — | | — | | — | | — | | 5 | 0 |
| Vitória da Conquista | 2015 | Baiano | — | | — | | — | | — | | 1 (Note: All appearance(s) in Copa Governador do Estado da Bahia) | 0 | 1 | 0 |
| Galícia | 2016 | Baiano | — | | 2 | 0 | — | | — | | — | | 2 | 0 |
| Doze | 2017 | Capixaba | — | | 2 | 0 | — | | — | | — | | 2 | 0 |
| Career total | | | 116 | 3 | 73 | 6 | 11 | 0 | 0 | 0 | 1 | 0 | 201 | 9 |
