= Michael (footballer, born February 1996) =

Brazilian footballer

Personal information
- Full name: Michael Santos Silva Alves
- Date of birth: February 16, 1996 (age 30)
- Place of birth: Feira de Santana, Brazil
- Height: 1.78 m (5 ft 10 in)
- Position: Midfielder

Team information
- Current team: Atlético de Alagoinhas

Senior career*
Years	Team	Apps	(Gls)
2016	Metropolitano	0	(0)
2018–2019	FC Gifu	12	(2)
2020	Jacobina	4	(0)
2020	Bahia de Feira	7	(1)
2021	Guarany de Sobral	6	(0)
2021	UNIRB	4	(0)
2022–2023	Praiense	8	(2)
2023–2024	Cherno More	19	(2)
2024	Dobrudzha	12	(0)
2025–	Atlético de Alagoinhas	0	(0)
- * Club domestic league appearances and goals as of 8 February 2025

Michael Santos Silva Alves (born February 16, 1996) is a Brazilian footballer who plays as a midfielder for Atlético de Alagoinhas.

== Career ==
In 2018 Michael joined J2 League club FC Gifu. He made his debut on 4 August in a match against Tochigi and scored two goals in 12 matches for two years.
