= Federação Bahiana de Futebol =

Brazilian football state federation

- Formation: 14 September 1913; 113 years ago
- Type: List of international sport federations
- Headquarters: Salvador, Bahia, Brazil
- Official language: Portuguese
- President: Ednaldo Rodrigues
- Website: fbf.org.br

The Federação Bahiana de Futebol (English: Football Association of Bahia state) was founded on 14 September 1913, and it manages all the official football tournaments within the state of Bahia, which are the Campeonato Baiano and the Campeonato Baiano lower levels, and represents the clubs at the Brazilian Football Confederation (CBF). Its headquarters are located in the Edifício Palácio dos Esportes, Praça Castro Alves, Salvador.

== Current clubs in Brasileirão ==
As of 2025 season.

Club	City
Série A
Bahia	Salvador
Vitória	Salvador
Série D
Jequié	Jequié
Juazeirense	Juazeiro
Barcelona de Ilhéus	Ilhéus
