= Botafogo Sport Club =

Botafogo
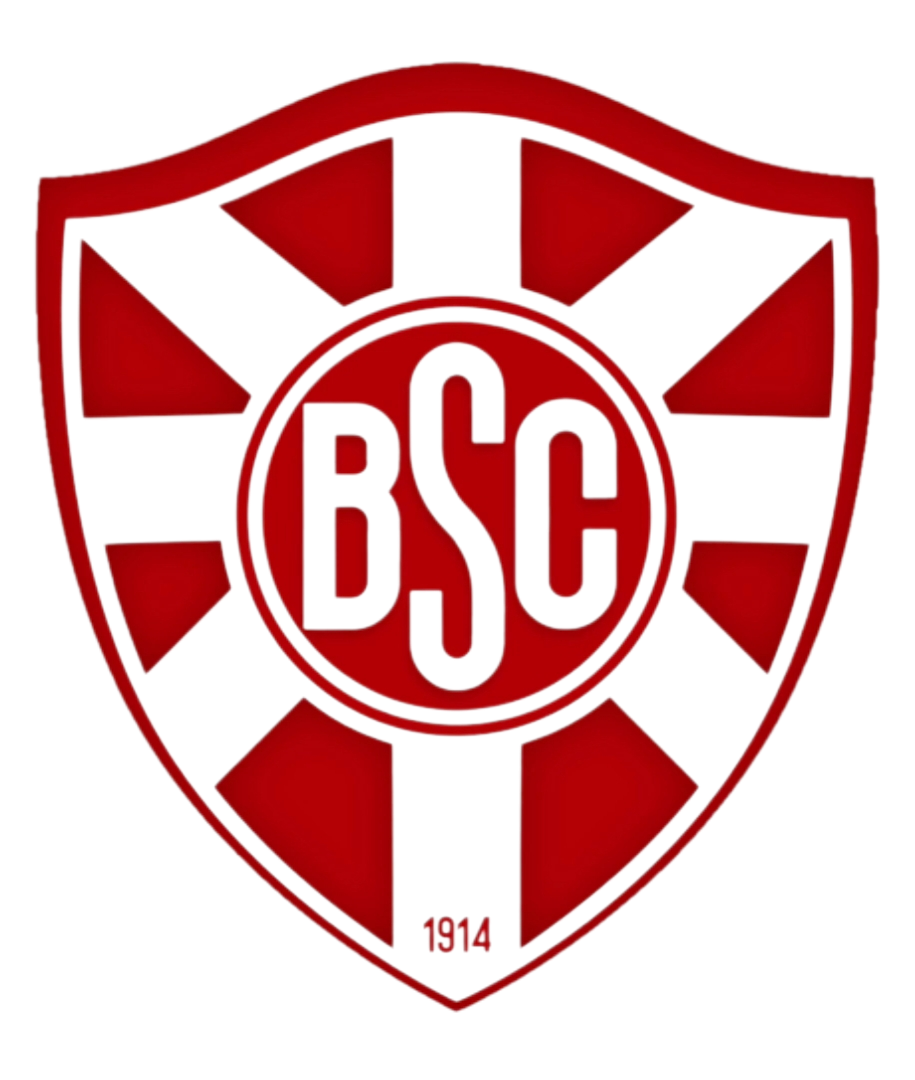
- Full name: Botafogo Sport Club
- Nickname(s): Fogo; O Mais Simpático; Diabo-rubro; Botafogo Bonfinense
- Founded: November 1, 1914
- Ground: Estádio Roberto Santos, Salvador, Bahia state, Brazil
- Capacity: 32,157
- League: Campeonato Baiano
- 2014: 12th
Home colors	Away colors

Botafogo Sport Club, commonly known as Botafogo, is a Brazilian football club based in Salvador, Bahia state. They won the Campeonato Baiano seven times.

== History ==
The club was founded on August 14, 1919. They won the Campeonato Baiano in 1919, 1922, 1923, 1926, 1930, 1935, and in 1938. The club participated in the Taça de Prata in 1980, when it finished in 62nd among 64 clubs. The club closed its football department in 1990, but reopened it in 2011 to compete in the Campeonato Baiano Second Level, when they were eliminated in the First Stage of the competition. The first game after their return was played on April 10, 2011, and the club was defeated 3–0 by Ypiranga.

== Stadium ==
Since the club reopened its activities in 2011, they play their home games at Estádio Roberto Santos, located in Pituaçu neighborhood, Salvador. The stadium has a maximum capacity of 32,157 people.

Until they folded in 1990, Botafogo Sport Club played their home games at Estádio Campo da Pólvora, located in Salvador. The stadium had a maximum capacity of 2,000 people.

== Honours ==
- Campeonato Baiano
  - Winners (7): 1919, 1922, 1923, 1926, 1930, 1935, 1938
  - Runners-up (8): 1918, 1929, 1932, 1943, 1953, 1954, 1961, 1965, 1977
- Campeonato Baiano Second Division
  - Winners (1): 2012
- Torneio Início da Bahia
  - Winners (6): 1924, 1925, 1940, 1948, 1952, 1963
