= Campeonato Baiano Third Division =

Football league in Brazil

- Organising body: FBF
- Founded: 2000; 26 years ago
- Country: Brazil
- State: Bahia
- Level on pyramid: 3
- Promotion to: 2nd Division
- Most championships: Itapetinga; Astro (1 title each)
- Website: FBF Official website

The Campeonato Baiano Third Division is the third tier of the professional state football league in the Brazilian state of Bahia state league. It is run by the Bahia Football Federation (FBF).

== List of champions ==
Season	Champions	Runners-up
2000	Itapetinga (1)	Independente
2001–2011	Not held	
2012	Astro (1)	Cruzeiro
2013–2022	Not held	
2023	Canceled	

== Titles by team ==
Teams in bold stills active.

Rank	Club	Winners	Winning years
1	**Astro**	1	2012
1	Itapetinga	1	2000

=== By city ===
City	Championships	Clubs
Feira de Santana	1	Astro (1)
Itapetinga	1	Itapetinga (1)
