= Guanambi Atlético Clube =

Guanambi
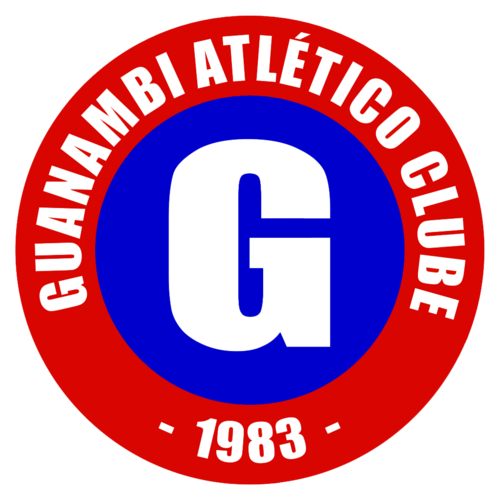
- Full name: Guanambi Atlético Clube
- Nickname(s): GAC; Guanambi; O mais querido de Guanambi
- Founded: February 8, 1983
- Ground: Estádio 2 de Julho, Guanambi, Bahia state, Brazil
- Capacity: 5,000
Home colours	Away colours

Guanambi Atlético Clube, commonly known as Guanambi, is a Brazilian football club based in Guanambi, Bahia state.

== History ==
The club was founded on February 8, 1983. Guanambi finished in the second place in the Campeonato Baiano Second Level twice. The first time was in 2004, when they lost the title to Ipitanga. The second time was in 2008, when they lost the competition to Madre de Deus.

== Stadium ==
Guanambi Atlético Clube play their home games at Estádio 2 de Julho. The stadium has a maximum capacity of 5,000 people.
