= Estádio de Pituaçu =

Football stadium in Salvador, Brazil

Coordinates: 12°56′47.89″S 38°25′1.27″W

Estádio Governador Roberto Santos
- Estádio de Pituaçu
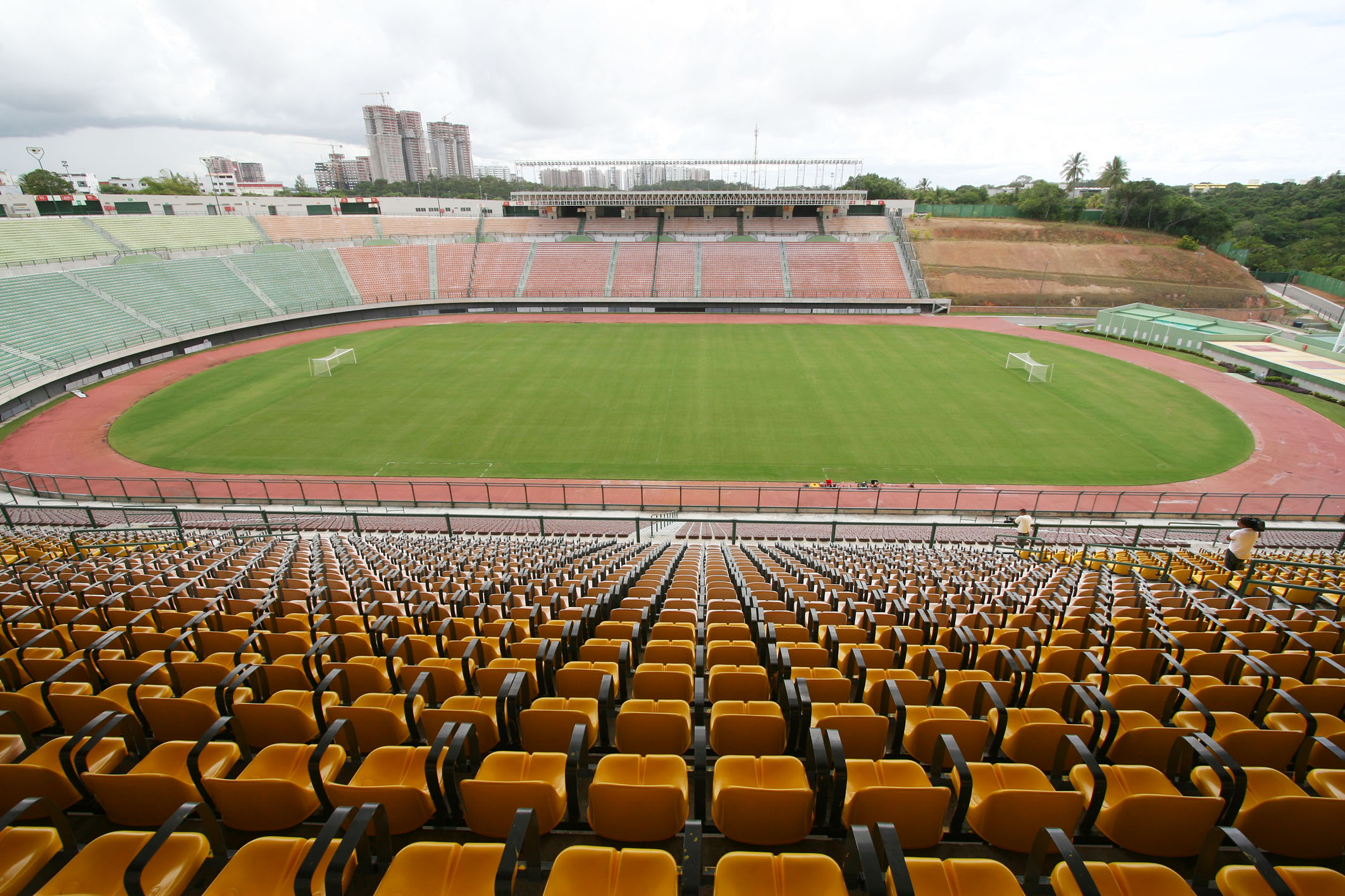
- Sisbrace
- Interactive map of Estádio Governador Roberto Santos
- Location: Salvador, Brazil
- Owner: State of Bahia
- Capacity: 32,157
- Surface: Grass
- Field size: 110 x 68m

Construction
- Opened: 1979
- Renovated: 2009

Tenant
- Esporte Clube Bahia (2008–2013)

Estádio Governador Roberto Santos, usually known as Estádio de Pituaçu, is a football stadium located in Salvador, Bahia state, Brazil. The stadium is owned by the Government of Bahia state and it was built in 1979. Its formal name honors Roberto Santos, who was a federal deputy, the governor of Bahia state from 1975 to 1979, a professor at the Faculty of Medicine of the Federal University of Bahia, and was the Minister of Health during José Sarney's government. The stadium became one of the most important stadiums in Bahia after the Fonte Nova stadium's demolition was announced, and it has a maximum capacity of 32,157 people, but it will be expanded to a maximum capacity of 34,000 people. It is Esporte Clube Bahia's home stadium during the rebuilding of the Arena Fonte Nova.

== History ==
The stadium construction concluded in 1979. The inaugural match was played on March 11 of that year, when Bahia beat Fluminense de Feira 2-0. The first goal of the stadium was scored by Bahia's Douglas.

The stadium's attendance record currently stands at 18,418, set on April 2, 1995, when Vitória beat Bahia 2-0.

On January 21, 2008, the stadium reformation started. It was planned to be concluded in August of the same year, but it was delayed to October due to a workers' strike. The first official game of the new stadium occurred on January 25, 2009, with Bahia defeating Ipitanga 4-0. Its maximum capacity will be expanded to 34,000 people, and it will be adapted to be in accordance with the Brazilian Supporters' Statute (Estatuto do Torcedor).

Estádio de Pituaçu hosted the 2010 World Cup Qualifying game between Brazil and Chile, played on September 9, 2009, and won by the Brazilians 4-2.
