= Estádio Joia da Princesa =

Football stadium in Feira de Santana, municipality of the brazilian state of Bahia

Coordinates: 12°14′40.50″S 38°58′20.46″W

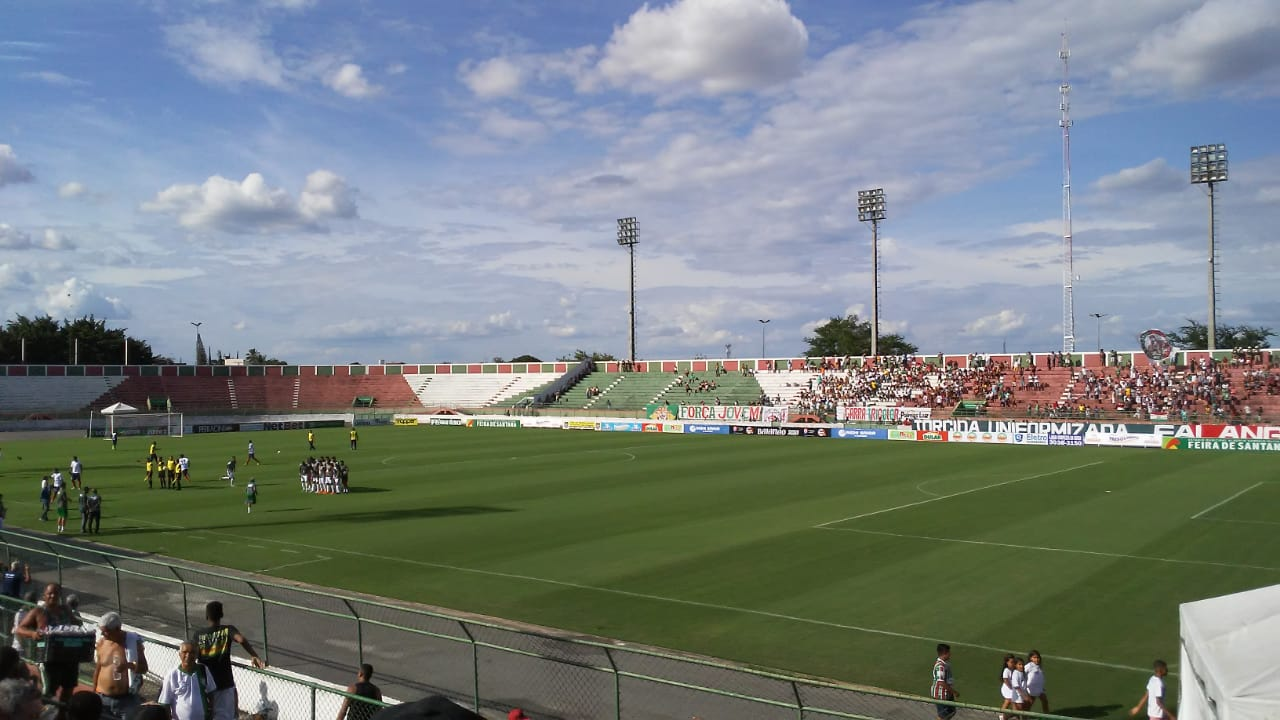
- Sisbrace
- Interactive map of Estádio Joia da Princesa
- Full name: Estádio Municipal Alberto Oliveira
- Location: Feira de Santana, Bahia Brazil
- Owner: Feira de Santana Town Hall
- Capacity: 16,274
- Surface: Grass

Construction
- Opened: April 23, 1953

Tenants
- Bahia de Feira; Feirense; Fluminense de Feira; Palmeiras Nordeste

Estádio Municipal Alberto Oliveira, usually known as Estádio Joia da Princesa, is a multi-use stadium in Feira de Santana, Brazil. It is currently used mostly for football matches. The stadium holds 16,274. It was built in 1953. Bahia de Feira, Feirense and Fluminense de Feira play their home games at the stadium. Palmeiras Nordeste also played at the stadium

Estádio Joia da Princesa is owned by the Feira de Santana Town Hall. The stadium's formal name honors Alberto Oliveira, who was a Feira de Santana's alderman (vereador, in Portuguese language) and was a president of Fluminense de Feira.

== History ==
In 1953, the works on Estádio Joia da Princesa were completed. The inaugural match was played on April 23 of that year, when Bahia de Feira beat Galícia Esporte Clube 2-0. The first goal of the stadium was scored by Bahia de Feira's Mário Porto.

The stadium's attendance record currently stands at 20,254, set on August 22, 1985 when Fluminense de Feira beat Vasco da Gama 1-0.
