= Catuense Futebol =

Catuense
- Full name: Catuense Futebol
- Nickname(s): Catuca
- Founded: January 1, 1974; 51 years ago
- Ground: Penão, Catu, Bahia state, Brazil
- Capacity: 8,000
- President: Cido Pena
- Website: https://web.archive.org/web/20110317192726/http://www.aecatuense.com.br/
Home colors	Away colors

Catuense Futebol, commonly known as Catuense, is a Brazilian football club based in Catu, Bahia state. They competed in the Série A once, in the Série B seven times, in the Série C seven times and in the Copa do Brasil once. The club was formerly known as Associação Desportiva Catuense.

== History ==
The club was founded on January 1, 1974, as Associação Desportiva Catuense. They competed in the Série B in 1982, in 1985, in 1986, in 1987, in 1988, in 1989, when they were eliminated in the semifinals, and in 1990, when they reached the semifinal stage. Catuense competed in the Série A in 1984, when they finished in the last place in their group. The club competed in the Série C in 1992, in 1993, in 1994, when they reached the semifinals of the competition, in 1995, in 1996, in 1997, and in 1998. Associação Desportiva Catuense was renamed to Catuense Futebol in 2001. The club won the Taça Estado da Bahia in 2001. Catuense competed in the Copa do Brasil in 2004, when they were eliminated in the First Stage by Atlético Mineiro.

== Honours ==
=== Official tournaments ===
State
Competitions	Titles	Seasons
Taça Estado da Bahia	1	2001

=== Runners-up ===
- Campeonato Baiano (4): 1983, 1986, 1987, 2003
- Taça Estado da Bahia (2): 1999, 2000
- Campeonato Baiano Second Division (1): 2013

== Stadium ==
Catuense Futebol play their home games at Estádio Antônio Pena, nicknamed Penão. The stadium has a maximum capacity of 8,000 people.
