= 1980 Campeonato Brasileiro Série B =

Campeonato Brasileiro Série B
- Season: 1980
- Champions: Londrina (1st title)
- Promoted: Londrina; CSA
- Matches: 278
- Goals: 677 (2.44 per match)
- Top goalscorer: Osmarzinho (Botafogo-SP) - 12 goals
- Biggest home win: Paysandu 5-0 Rio Negro-AM (March 12, 1980); Botafogo-SP 5-0 Goiânia (April 6, 1980); Botafogo-SP 6-1 Paysandu (April 20, 1980)
- Biggest away win: Botafogo-BA 0-7 Americano (March 15, 1980)
- Highest scoring: América-SP 6-2 Figueirense (March 15, 1980)

The 1980 Campeonato Brasileiro Série B, officially, the Taça de Prata 1980, was the 3rd edition of the Campeonato Brasileiro Série B. The championship was performed by 64 clubs, divided into 8 groups of 8 teams each, in which the first-placed team of each group proceeded to a playoff in which the winners would be promoted to the Second phase of the Copa Brasil of the same year. The losers would proceed to the second phase of the Taça de Prata, in which 20 teams (the losers of the promotion playoff, and the second and third-placed teams in each group)were divided into four groups of five teams. The winner of each group qualified to the semifinals, disputed in a knockout tournament format, in which the winners were promoted to the Taça de Ouro of the following year.

== First phase ==
=== Group A ===
Pos	Team	Pld	W	D	L	GF	GA	GD	Pts
1	(Pará) Paysandu	7	4	3	0	12	4	+8	11
2	(Maranhão) Sampaio Corrêa	7	3	3	1	14	10	+4	9
3	(Pará) Tuna Luso	7	3	2	2	13	9	+4	8
4	(Piauí) River	7	2	4	1	6	3	+3	8
5	(Maranhão) Moto Club	7	1	5	1	10	10	0	7
6	(Amazonas (Brazilian state)) Rio Negro	7	2	1	4	8	16	−8	5
7	Piauí	7	2	0	5	8	13	−5	4
8	(Amazonas (Brazilian state)) Fast Clube	7	0	4	3	6	12	−6	4

=== Group B ===
Pos	Team	Pld	W	D	L	GF	GA	GD	Pts
1	(Rio de Janeiro (state)) Americano	7	5	1	1	20	7	+13	11
2	(Alagoas) CSA	7	5	0	2	13	7	+6	10
3	(Rio de Janeiro (state)) Bonsucesso	7	4	2	1	10	6	+4	10
4	(Alagoas) ASA	7	3	2	2	6	6	0	8
5	(Bahia) Itabuna	7	3	1	3	9	9	0	7
6	(Sergipe) Confiança	7	1	2	4	4	9	−5	4
7	Sergipe	7	1	1	5	8	15	−7	3
8	(Bahia) Botafogo-BA	7	1	1	5	6	17	−11	3

=== Group C ===
Pos	Team	Pld	W	D	L	GF	GA	GD	Pts
1	(Pernambuco) Sport	7	5	2	0	9	1	+8	12
2	(Ceará) Fortaleza	7	4	1	2	12	7	+5	9
3	(Rio Grande do Norte) ABC	7	3	1	3	7	5	+2	7
4	(Paraíba) Campinense	7	1	5	1	4	4	0	7
5	(Pernambuco) Central	7	1	4	2	3	3	0	6
6	(Bahia) Leônico	7	1	4	2	3	6	−3	6
7	(Rio Grande do Norte) Baraúnas	7	2	1	4	6	13	−7	5
8	(Paraíba) Treze	7	0	4	3	5	10	−5	4

=== Group D ===
Pos	Team	Pld	W	D	L	GF	GA	GD	Pts
1	(Goiás) Anapolina	7	4	2	1	11	5	+6	10
2	(Goiás) Itumbiara	7	5	0	2	11	6	+5	10
3	(Minas Gerais) Uberaba	7	4	2	1	10	7	+3	10
4	(Federal District (Brazil)) Brasília	7	4	0	3	12	8	+4	8
5	(Mato Grosso) Operário-MT	7	2	3	2	6	6	0	7
6	(Minas Gerais) Villa Nova	7	1	3	3	4	5	−1	5
7	(Mato Grosso) União Rondonópolis	7	2	1	4	6	12	−6	5
8	(Federal District (Brazil)) Guará	7	0	1	6	3	14	−11	1

=== Group E ===
Pos	Team	Pld	W	D	L	GF	GA	GD	Pts
1	(Minas Gerais) Uberlândia	7	4	1	2	8	5	+3	9
2	(Mato Grosso do Sul) Comercial-MS	7	3	2	2	8	6	+2	8
3	(Minas Gerais) América-MG	7	3	2	2	7	6	+1	8
4	(Goiás) Goiânia	7	2	4	1	4	3	+1	8
5	(Minas Gerais) Caldense	7	3	1	3	8	4	+4	7
6	(Espírito Santo) Vitória	7	2	2	3	6	8	−2	6
7	Goiás	7	1	4	2	5	6	−1	6
8	(Espírito Santo) Rio Branco-ES	7	1	2	4	5	13	−8	4

=== Group F ===
Pos	Team	Pld	W	D	L	GF	GA	GD	Pts
1	(Rio de Janeiro (state)) Bangu	7	5	1	1	13	5	+8	11
2	(São Paulo (state)) Ferroviária	7	4	1	2	11	7	+4	9
3	(São Paulo (state)) Botafogo-SP	7	3	1	3	11	7	+4	7
4	(São Paulo (state)) Internacional de Limeira	7	3	1	3	8	6	+2	7
5	(São Paulo (state)) Noroeste	7	3	1	3	5	8	−3	7
6	(Rio de Janeiro (state)) Goytacaz	7	2	2	3	4	9	−5	6
7	(Rio de Janeiro (state)) Campo Grande	7	2	1	4	10	11	−1	5
8	(Rio de Janeiro (state)) Serrano-RJ	7	1	2	4	4	13	−9	4

=== Group G ===
Pos	Team	Pld	W	D	L	GF	GA	GD	Pts
1	(São Paulo (state)) América-SP	7	6	1	0	23	9	+14	13
2	(Rio Grande do Sul) Caxias	7	3	4	0	8	5	+3	10
3	(Paraná (state)) Grêmio Maringá	7	3	2	2	12	7	+5	8
4	(Santa Catarina (state)) Figueirense	7	3	1	3	13	12	+1	7
5	(São Paulo (state)) XV de Piracicaba	7	2	2	3	11	11	0	6
6	(Rio Grande do Sul) Novo Hamburgo	7	2	1	4	5	13	−8	5
7	(Paraná (state)) Operário-PR	7	2	0	5	6	14	−8	4
8	(Santa Catarina (state)) Avaí	7	1	1	5	7	14	−7	3

=== Group H ===
Pos	Team	Pld	W	D	L	GF	GA	GD	Pts
1	(São Paulo (state)) Juventus	7	5	1	1	12	6	+6	11
2	(São Paulo (state)) Comercial-SP	7	4	3	0	10	2	+8	11
3	(Paraná (state)) Londrina	7	4	1	2	10	8	+2	9
4	(Paraná (state)) Atlético-PR	7	2	5	0	5	3	+2	9
5	(Rio Grande do Sul) Juventude	7	2	2	3	8	9	−1	6
6	(Rio Grande do Sul) Brasil de Pelotas	7	0	5	2	7	9	−2	5
7	(Santa Catarina (state)) Criciúma	7	1	2	4	6	10	−4	4
8	(Santa Catarina (state)) Chapecoense	7	0	1	6	2	13	−11	1

== Promotion play-off ==
Team 1	Agg.	Team 2	1st leg	2nd leg
Paysandu	2-3	Americano	2-1	0-2
Juventus	2-2	América-SP	2-0	0-2
Anapolina	1-4	Sport	1-1	0-3
Uberlândia	2-4	Bangu	2-0	0-4

== Second phase ==
=== Group I ===
Pos	Team	Pld	W	D	L	GF	GA	GD	Pts	Qualification
1	Botafogo-SP	4	3	1	0	18	5	+13	7	Qualified to Semifinals
2	Fortaleza	4	1	3	0	5	3	+2	5	
3	Goiânia	4	1	1	2	3	7	−4	3	
4	Paysandu	4	1	1	2	3	9	−6	3	
5	Itumbiara	4	1	0	3	5	11	−6	2	

=== Group J ===
Pos	Team	Pld	W	D	L	GF	GA	GD	Pts	Qualification
1	Londrina	4	4	0	0	8	2	+6	8	Qualified to Semifinals
2	Grêmio Maringá	4	3	0	1	10	4	+6	6	
3	Sampaio Corrêa	4	1	1	2	6	8	−2	3	
4	Anapolina	4	0	2	2	4	9	−5	2	
5	Bonsucesso	4	0	1	3	4	9	−5	1	

=== Group K ===
Pos	Team	Pld	W	D	L	GF	GA	GD	Pts	Qualification
1	CSA	4	2	2	0	5	3	+2	6	Qualified to Semifinals
2	Caxias	4	2	1	1	4	3	+1	5	
3	Comercial-SP	4	2	0	2	7	5	+2	4	
4	Tuna Luso	4	1	1	2	2	4	−2	3	
5	Uberlândia	4	1	0	3	3	6	−3	2	

=== Group L ===
Pos	Team	Pld	W	D	L	GF	GA	GD	Pts	Qualification
1	Ferroviária	4	3	1	0	7	1	+6	7	Qualified to Semifinals
2	Uberaba	4	2	1	1	6	3	+3	5	
3	ABC	4	2	1	1	9	10	−1	5	
4	Juventus	4	0	2	2	4	6	−2	2	
5	América-MG	4	0	1	3	4	10	−6	1	

== Semifinals ==
Team 1	Agg.	Team 2	1st leg	2nd leg
Botafogo-SP	1-3	Londrina	1-2	0-1
CSA	2-0	Ferroviária	1-0	1-0

== Finals ==
=== First leg ===
11 May 1980

CSA (Alagoas)	1 – 1	(Paraná (state)) Londrina
Dentinho 76'		Paulinho 85'

Rei Pelé, Maceió (AL)
Attendance: 25,659
Referee: (São Paulo (state)) Oscar Scolfaro

=== Second leg ===
18 May 1980

Londrina (Paraná (state))	4 – 0	(Alagoas) CSA
Zé Antônio 29'; Lívio 33'; Paulinho 80', 84'

Café, Londrina (PR)
Attendance: 36,489
Referee: (Rio de Janeiro (state)) José Roberto Wright

== Sources ==
- RSSSF
