= Higor Farias =

Brazilian footballer (born 2007)

Personal information
- Full name: Higor Augusto Farias de Oliveira
- Date of birth: 6 January 2003 (age 23)
- Place of birth: Brazil
- Height: 1.69 m (5 ft 7 in)
- Position: Winger

Team information
- Current team: Atlético de Alagoinhas
- Number: 7

Youth career
- 2021–2022: XV de Jaú
- 2022–2024: Corinthians

Senior career*
Years	Team	Apps	(Gls)
2024	Água Santa	0	(0)
2025	Brasil de Pelotas	12	(0)
2026–	Atlético de Alagoinhas	13	(0)
- * Club domestic league appearances and goals as of 31 May 2026

Higor Augusto Farias de Oliveira (born 6 January 2003), known as Higor Farias, is a Brazilian footballer who plays as a Winger for Alagoinhas.

== Club career ==
Higor Farias joined XV de Jaú' U20 categories at the age of nineteen. After a great performance in the Campeonato Paulista Sub-20 championship in the 2021 season, Higor Farias caught the attention of Corinthians and signed a contract to play for the team until December 2024. The player was one of the 30 registered by Danilo for the 2024 São Paulo Junior Football Cup.

In 2024, Higo was part of the team that won the 2024 Copinha championship. Shortly after winning the title, Higor Farias terminated his contract with the club through Brazilian courts, citing the club's failure to honor financial agreements and payment obligations. He subsequently signed with Água Santa for the remainder of the 2024 season.

== Career statistics ==
As of 24 May 2026

Club	Season	League			State league		Cup		Continental		Other		Total	
Club	Season	Division	Apps	Goals	Apps	Goals	Apps	Goals	Apps	Goals	Apps	Goals	Apps	Goals
Brasil de pelotas	2025	Série D	0	0	12	0	0	0	0	0	—		12	0
Alagoinhas-BA	2026	Série D	7	0	6	0	1	0	0	0	—		14	0
Total			7	0	18	0	1	0	0	0	0	0	26	0

== Honours ==
Corinthians U20

- Copa São Paulo de Futebol Júnior: 2024
