= UNIRB Futebol Clube =

Brazilian football club based in Alagoinhas, Brazil

UNIRB
- Full name: Universitário Regional do Brasil Futebol Clube
- Founded: 12 October 2018
- Ground: Estádio Municipal Antonio Carneiro
- League: Campeonato Baiano Second Level
- Website: http://unirb.esp.br/time/
| Home colours | Away colours |

UNIRB Futebol Clube is a Brazilian football club in the city of Alagoinhas, in the state of Bahia. Their colors are blue, red and white. The club is linked to the Centro Universitário UNIRB. Competed in the Campeonato Baiano Second Level for access to the first division, in 2019 for the first time.

== History ==
The club belongs to the UNIRB education network (Centro Universitário Regional do Brasil). It was created in an academic extension project with the initial objective of helping to develop the education of students at the institution, in areas such as Physical Education, Physiotherapy, Nutrition, Psychology and Law.

At the end of 2018, the university board decided to register the team to compete in professional championships. The team disputed in the professional tournament for the first time in 2019, when participating in the Campeonato Baiano Second Level. And in 2020, the UNIRB played in the second division final with the Colo-Colo from Ilhéus. The Alagoinhas club won on penalties and became champion of the tournament, being promoted to dispute the Campeonato Baiano for the first time in 2021. In the 2022 edition, UNIRB had its worst campaign and was consequently relegated to the serie B.

== Achievements ==
- Campeonato Baiano Second Level:
  - Winners (1): 2020
