= 1985 Campeonato Brasileiro Série B =

Campeonato Brasileiro Série B
- Season: 1985
- Champions: Tuna Luso (1st title)
- Promoted: Tuna Luso
- Matches: 48
- Goals: 109 (2.27 per match)
- Top goalscorer: Guilherme (Figueirense) - 6 goals
- Biggest home win: Tuna Luso 5-1 Fortaleza (March 13, 1985)
- Biggest away win: Colorado 0-3 Marília (February 9, 1985)
- Longest winning run: Tuna Luso (3 matches;9 February to 10 March); Operário-MS (3 matches;3 February to 2 March); Figueirense (3 matches;10 February to 10 March); Tuna Luso (3 matches;13 March to 31 March)
- Longest unbeaten run: Tuna Luso (8 matches)

The 1985 Campeonato Brasileiro Série B, officially, the Taça de Prata, was the 8th edition of the Campeonato Brasileiro Série B. The championship was disputed by 24 clubs in a knockout tournament form, until the last phase, disputed by a group of three teams. the champion would be promoted to the 1986 Copa Brasil. Tuna Luso won the title, beating Goytacaz and Figueirense in the final group.

== First phase ==
Team 1	Agg.	Team 2	1st leg	2nd leg
Moto Club (Maranhão)	0–3	(Pará) Tuna Luso	0–0	0–3
União Rondonópolis (Mato Grosso)	1-3	(Amazonas (Brazilian state)) Rio Negro	1–1	0-2
River (Piauí)	1–5	(Ceará) Fortaleza	1–3	0–2
Treze (Paraíba)	3-1	(Rio Grande do Norte) América-RN	2-0	1-1
América-SP (São Paulo (state))	1–1(p)	(Rio de Janeiro (state)) Goytacaz	1–0	0–1
América-MG (Minas Gerais)	2–2(p)	(Espírito Santo) Vitória-ES	2–0	0–2
Central (Pernambuco)	1-1(p)	(Alagoas) CRB	1–1	0–0
Confiança (Sergipe)	0–3	(Bahia) Catuense	0–2	0–1
Marília (São Paulo (state))	4–1	(Paraná (state)) Colorado	1–1	3–0
Novo Hamburgo (Rio Grande do Sul)	1-2	(Santa Catarina (state)) Figueirense	0-0	1-2
Sobradinho (Federal District (Brazil))	1-3	(Rio de Janeiro (state)) Americano	0-0	1-3
Operário-MS (Mato Grosso do Sul)	4-1	(Goiás) Goiânia	2–0	2-1

== Second phase ==
Team 1	Agg.	Team 2	1st leg	2nd leg
Tuna Luso (Pará)	3–1	(Amazonas (Brazilian state)) Rio Negro	1–0	2–1
Treze (Paraíba)	3-4	(Ceará) Fortaleza	3–1	0-3
América-MG (Minas Gerais)	1–4	(Rio de Janeiro (state)) Goytacaz	1–3	0–1
Central (Pernambuco)	1–1(p)	(Bahia) Catuense	1–1	0–0
Marília (São Paulo (state))	3-6	(Santa Catarina (state)) Figueirense	2-3	1-3
Operário-MS (Mato Grosso do Sul)	3–0	(Rio de Janeiro (state)) Americano	3–0	0–0

== Third phase ==
Team 1	Agg.	Team 2	1st leg	2nd leg
Fortaleza (Ceará)	1-5	(Pará) Tuna Luso	0–0	1-5
Catuense (Bahia)	1–3	(Rio de Janeiro (state)) Goytacaz	0–0	1–3
Operário-MS (Mato Grosso do Sul)	2–4	(Santa Catarina (state)) Figueirense	2–1	0–3

== Final triangular ==
Pos	Team	Pld	W	D	L	GF	GA	GD	Pts
1	(Pará) Tuna Luso	4	3	0	1	7	5	+2	6
2	(Rio de Janeiro (state)) Goytacaz	4	1	1	2	4	4	0	3
3	(Santa Catarina (state)) Figueirense	4	1	1	2	7	9	−2	3

== Sources ==
- 1985 Taça de Prata at RSSSF
