= Grapiúna Atlético Clube =

Grapiúna
- Full name: Grapiúna Atlético Clube
- Nickname(s): Aurinegro Baiano; Bem-Te-Vi do Sul
- Founded: March 11, 1996
- Ground: Itabunão, Itabuna, Bahia state, Brazil
- Capacity: 11,745
Home colours	Away colours

Grapiúna Atlético Clube, commonly known as Grapiúna, is a Brazilian football club based in Itabuna, Bahia state.

== History ==
The club was founded on October 12, 1998. Grapiúna finished in the second place in the Campeonato Baiano Second Level in 2001, when they lost the title to Palmeiras Nordeste.

== Stadium ==
Grapiúna Atlético Clube play their home games at Estádio Luiz Viana Filho, nicknamed Itabunão. The stadium has a maximum capacity of 11,745 people.
