= Vitória da Conquista =

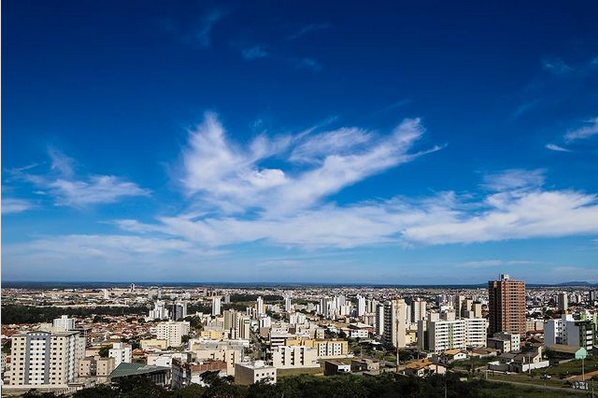
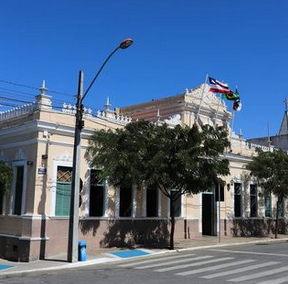
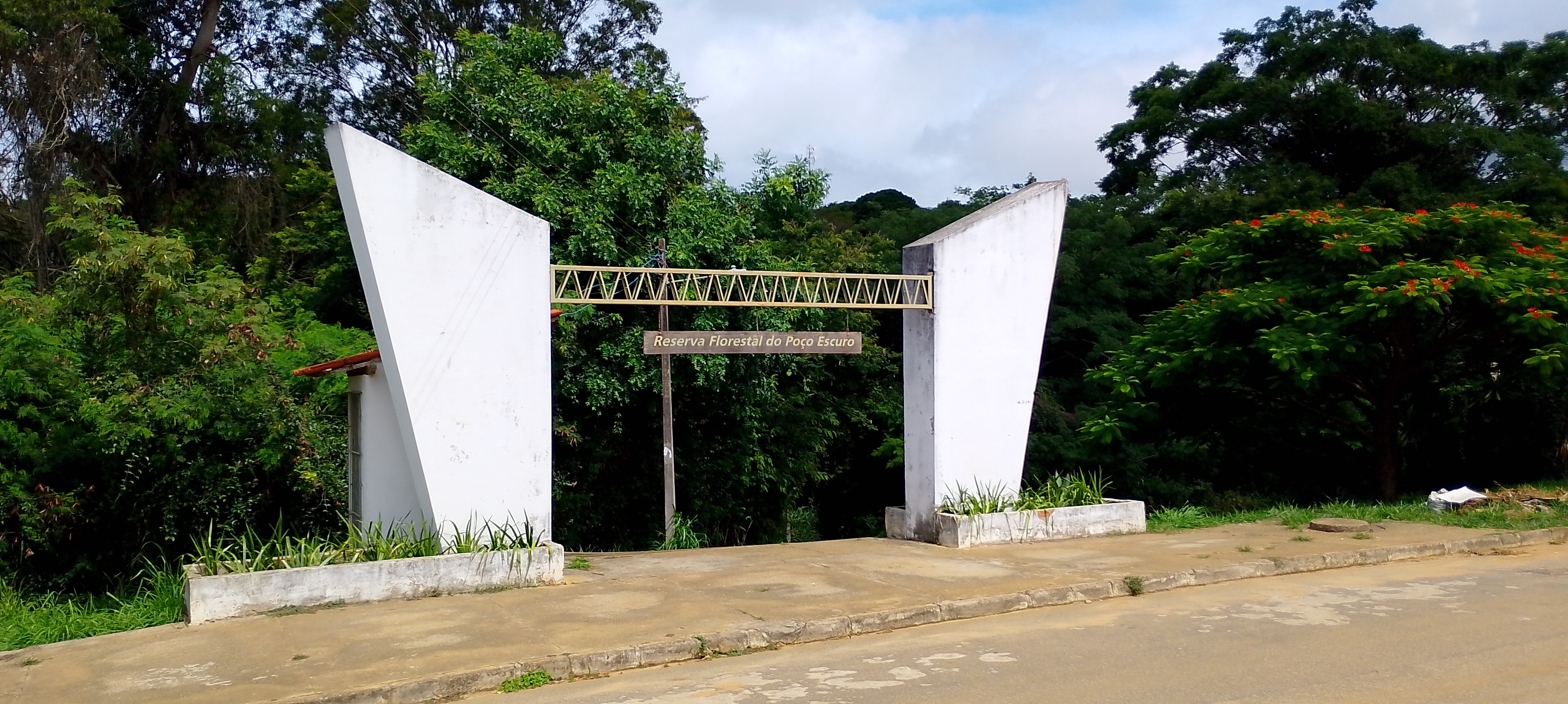

- Flag Coat of arms

- Location in Bahia, Brazil

- Location within Brazil
- Coordinates: 14°51′57″S 40°50′20″W
- Country: Brazil
- Region: Northeast
- State: Bahia
- Founded: November 9, 1840

Government
  - Mayor: Sheila Lemos (DEM)

Area
  - Total: 3,204.257 km^{2} (1,237.171 sq mi)
- Elevation: 923 m (3,028 ft)

Population (2022)
  - Total: 370,879
  - Estimate (2025): 396,613
  - Density: 115.746/km^{2} (299.780/sq mi)
- Time zone: UTC−3 (BRT)
  - Summer (DST): UTC-2 (UTC-2)
- Area code: 77
- Website: Prefeitura de Vitória da Conquista

Vitória da Conquista is a municipality in Bahia, Brazil, that has a population of 396,613 people as of 2025, according to the IBGE (Brazilian Institute of Geography and Statistics). It is the third largest city in the state of Bahia, after Salvador and Feira de Santana.

Vitória da Conquista is known as simply "Conquista" by locals in order to differentiate it from the city of Vitória in the state of Espírito Santo. It was named after the colony of Vitória da Conquista.

== History ==
Vitória da Conquista was founded in 1783, after several battles against the native Imboré and Mongoió tribes by João Gonçalves da Costa, born in Chaves, Trás-os-Montes, Portugal.

Costa had served the Portuguese crown during Joseph I's kingdom, fighting the natives, conquering their land, and attempting to convert them to Christianity. He founded the Arraial da Conquista ("Conquest Town") near the site of the last battles and began the building of a church in honour of the Holy Mother of Victory.

At the same time, João Gonçalves da Costa was ordered to lead the construction of two of the principal roads in the state of Bahia, one from Vitória da Conquista to the city of Ilhéus on the coast and another from Vitória da Conquista to the Jequitinhonha River in Minas Gerais. Today, the latter road has become part of the larger federal highway system, and is known as the Rio-Bahia — BR-116.

== Geography ==
=== Climate ===
Vitória da Conquista has a tropical highland climate (Köppen: Cwa, closely bordering on Cwb and Aw). The altitude of the city itself varies between 923 meters and 1100 meters. Precipitation from April to August is often characterized by fine, misty rain, while heavier rains fall from October to March. Winters (July through October) tend to lack much precipitation but are cool and humid, with cold air coming up to the plateau from the ocean and often producing fog.

Mean temperature varies from a low of 17.8 °C (64 °F) in July to 21.8 °C (71 °F) in March. Mean rainfall ranges from 17.9 mm (.7 inches) in July to 127.8 mm (5 inches) in December. (1961-1990 trends from Hong Kong Observatories).

The vegetation ranges from very dry and coarse (1,000 meters and above) to an array of grasses, ferns and palms at slightly lower elevations on the plateau. This is the coffee-growing elevation.

Climate data for Vitória da Conquista (1981–2010)
Month	Jan	Feb	Mar	Apr	May	Jun	Jul	Aug	Sep	Oct	Nov	Dec	Year
Mean daily maximum °C (°F)	28.1 (82.6)	28.6 (83.5)	27.8 (82.0)	26.4 (79.5)	25.1 (77.2)	23.2 (73.8)	22.9 (73.2)	23.8 (74.8)	26.0 (78.8)	27.5 (81.5)	27.4 (81.3)	27.6 (81.7)	26.2 (79.2)
Daily mean °C (°F)	22.3 (72.1)	22.4 (72.3)	22.1 (71.8)	21.0 (69.8)	19.8 (67.6)	18.0 (64.4)	17.5 (63.5)	18.0 (64.4)	19.6 (67.3)	21.1 (70.0)	21.7 (71.1)	22.1 (71.8)	20.5 (68.9)
Mean daily minimum °C (°F)	18.1 (64.6)	17.9 (64.2)	18.1 (64.6)	17.5 (63.5)	16.2 (61.2)	14.5 (58.1)	13.8 (56.8)	13.8 (56.8)	15.0 (59.0)	16.2 (61.2)	17.4 (63.3)	17.9 (64.2)	16.4 (61.5)
Average precipitation mm (inches)	98.7 (3.89)	76.7 (3.02)	114.0 (4.49)	57.4 (2.26)	24.0 (0.94)	20.8 (0.82)	24.8 (0.98)	19.9 (0.78)	20.8 (0.82)	45.9 (1.81)	129.5 (5.10)	125.6 (4.94)	758.1 (29.85)
Average precipitation days (≥ 1.0 mm)	8	6	10	8	6	6	7	4	4	5	8	9	81
Average relative humidity (%)	75.9	75.2	79.7	82.1	82.2	83.2	82.8	78.9	75.0	72.7	76.5	76.9	78.4
Mean monthly sunshine hours	217.3	197.8	203.3	188.3	187.3	165.4	179.3	201.0	205.7	211.8	171.6	178.7	2,307.5
Source: Instituto Nacional de Meteorologia

== Economy ==
The major economic activities are commerce, medical services, and coffee growing. The city is home to the main campus of Southwest Bahia State University.

The local economy includes major enterprises such as Grupo Marinho de Andrade (Teiú and Revani), Coca-Cola, Dilly Calçados, Umbro, BahiaFarma, and Café Maratá, alongside small-scale and cottage industries. Event facilities in the city include the Miraflores Arena.

The entrepreneurial Ymborés Industrial Park (Centro Industrial dos Ymborés) lies on the outskirts of the city along with industries such as ceramics, granite/marble, shoes, toilet valves, cleaning products, bedding, and many others. Micro industries produce safes, candles, clothing, packaging, and hundreds of other products for local consumption and export.

As a business center, Vitoria da Conquista serves the entire southwestern region of the state of Bahia and the northern part of the state of Minas Gerais.

== Transportation ==
Vitória da Conquista is served by Glauber Rocha Airport. It was named after the Brazilian film director Glauber Rocha, who was born in Vitória da Conquista. There is also a bus terminal with lines that go to all cities in the state and major cities in the country.

There is no rail line that runs through the city.

== Sports ==
The city is home of the Série D football club Esporte Clube Vitória da Conquista, and former Série B Serrano Sport Club.

== Crime ==
According to the 2024 Atlas of Violence, published by the Institute for Applied Economic Research (Ipea) and the Brazilian Public Security Forum (FBSP), Vitória da Conquista recorded a homicide rate of 22.1 per 100,000 inhabitants in 2022. This places the city at 163rd nationally among municipalities with more than 100,000 residents and as the safest city in the state of Bahia.

In contrast, other cities in Bahia face significantly higher homicide rates. Santo Antônio de Jesus leads with 94.1 per 100,000 inhabitants, followed by Jequié (91.9), Simões Filho (81.2), Camaçari (76.6), and Juazeiro (72.3).

Additionally, the Vitória da Conquista City Hall has implemented several initiatives to maintain and improve public safety. These include the creation of the Municipal Guard, the development of a Municipal Public Security Plan, and the “Brilha Conquista” program, which replaced street lighting with LED lights to help reduce crime.

== Historic structures ==
Vitória da Conquista is home to numerous historic structures. Only the House of Dona Zaza (Casa de Dona Zaza) is protected as a state monument.

== Notable people ==
- Glauber de Andrade Rocha - Film Director.
- Antônio Rodrigo Nogueira aka "Minotauro" — mixed martial artist
- Nayara Ribeiro — swimmer
- Leandro de Oliveira - Brazilian track and field athlete.

== See also ==
- List of municipalities in Bahia
