= Cruzeiro Futebol Clube (BA) =

Cruzeiro
- Full name: Cruzeiro Futebol Clube
- Founded: September 26, 1967
- Ground: Barbosão, Cruz das Almas, Bahia state, Brazil
- Capacity: 8,000
Home colours	Away colours

Cruzeiro Futebol Clube, commonly known as Cruzeiro, is a Brazilian football club based in Cruz das Almas, Bahia state.

== History ==
The club was founded on September 26, 1967. Cruzeiro won the Campeonato Baiano Second Level in 1998.

== Achievements ==
- Campeonato Baiano Second Level:
  - Winners (1): 1998

== Stadium ==
Cruzeiro Futebol Clube play their home games at Estádio Municipal Carmelito Barbosa Alves, nicknamed Barbosão. The stadium has a maximum capacity of 8,000 people.
