= Esporte Clube Ypiranga =

Ypiranga
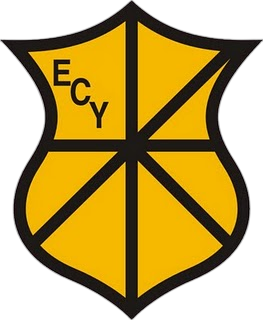
- Full name: Esporte Clube Ypiranga
- Nickname: O Mais Querido
- Founded: 7 September 1906
- Ground: Estádio Deputado Galdino Leite
- Capacity: 4,000
- President: Valdemar Filho
- Head coach: Fábio Marques
- League: Campeonato Baiano (Second Division)
- 2014: 7th
Home colours	Away colours

Esporte Clube Ypiranga is a football team of Salvador, Bahia. Its colours are yellow and black.

With 10 titles of the Campeonato Baiano, it has the third-most titles in the Bahia state championship, coming behind Vitória and Bahia, with 30 and 50 titles, respectively.

== History ==
Esporte Clube Ypiranga was founded on 7 September 1906, originating itself from Sport Club Sete de Setembro, founded on 17 April 1904. it is one of the oldest football teams in Bahia.

The team participated in the Campeonato Baiano for the first time in 1914, finishing in third place. Eventually, the team won its first title in 1917, finishing the championship without losing a match. After that, the team won another nine titles, the latest of them in 1951. Despite being one of the most traditional teams in Bahia, Ypiranga has not participated in the Campeonato Brasileiro at any level. Ypiranga eventually was relegated to the Second Division of the Campeonato Baiano in 1999 and has not been promoted back into the first division ever since.

== Honours ==
=== Regional ===
- Torneio dos Campeões do Norte
  - Winners (1): 1951

=== State ===
- Campeonato Baiano
  - Winners (10): 1917*, 1918*, 1920, 1921*, 1925*, 1928*, 1929*, 1932*, 1939, 1951
  - Runners-up (11): 1915, 1926, 1927, 1931, 1933, 1937, 1938, 1946, 1949, 1952, 1960
- Campeonato Baiano Second Division
  - Winners (2): 1983, 1990*
- Torneio Início da Bahia
  - Winners (8): 1919, 1922, 1929, 1933, 1947, 1956, 1959, 1963

* being an unbeaten champion.
