= Associação Desportiva Jequié =

Jequié
- Full name: Associação Desportiva Jequié
- Nickname: Jipão (Big Jeep)
- Founded: 20 November 1969; 56 years ago
- Ground: Waldomiro Borges, Jequié
- Capacity: 3,000
- President: Leur Lomanto Júnior
- Head coach: Erivaldo Silva
- League: Campeonato Baiano
- 2025 2025: Série D, 45th of 64; Baiano, 7th of 10
Home colours	Away colours	Third colours

Associação Desportiva Jequié, known as Jequié, are a Brazilian football team from Jequié, Bahia. The club competes in the Campeonato Baiano and the Campeonato Brasileiro Série D.

== History ==
Founded on 20 November 1969, Jequié featured regularly in the Campeonato Baiano first division during the 70s, being relegated in 1980. After a period of inactivity, the club returned in 1991 and was crowned champions of the second level in the following year.

After an impressive third position in 1994, Jequié was relegated as dead last in 1997. After spending the 200s floating between the second and first levels and also through inactivity, the team was again crowned champions of the second division in 2017.

== Honours ==
- Campeonato Baiano Second Division:
  - Winners (3): 1992, 2017, 2023
