= Catu =

Municipality of Bahia, Brazil

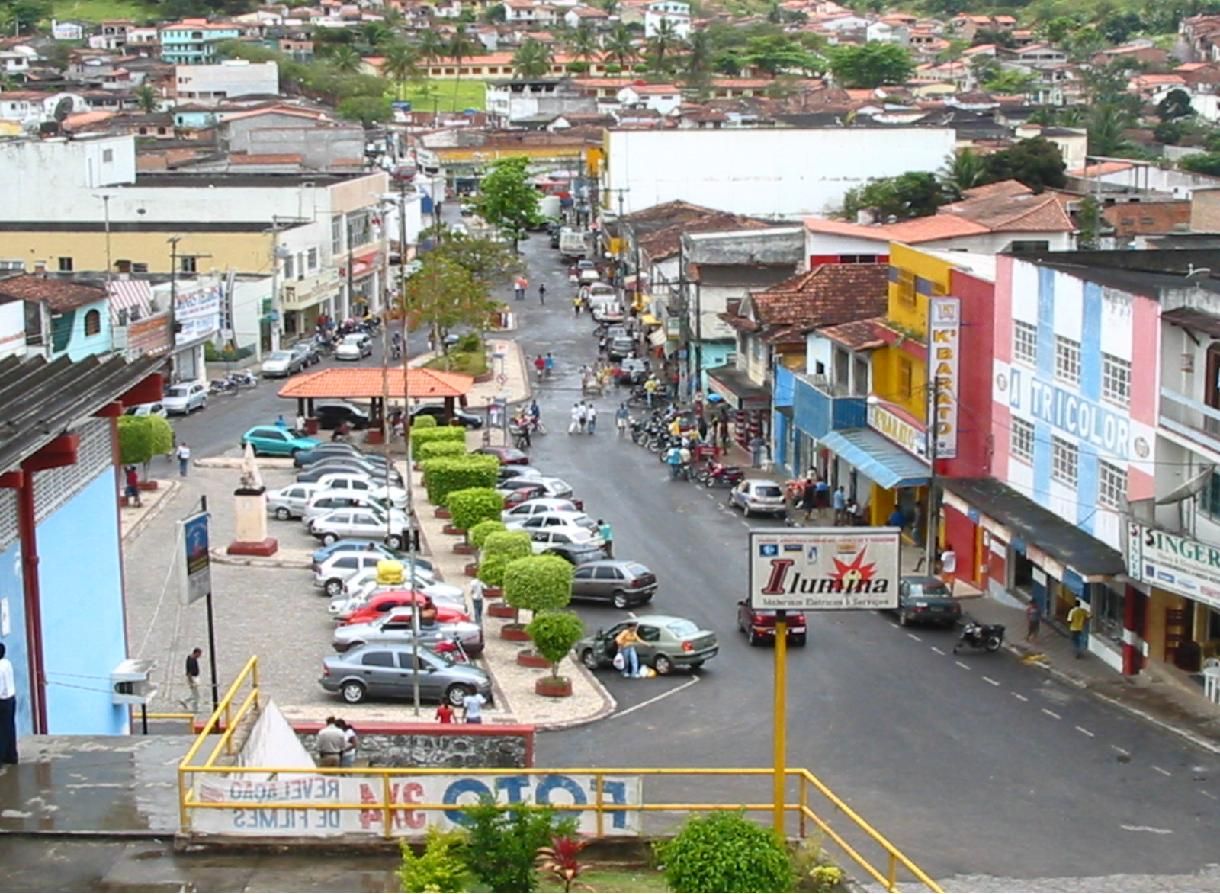
- Center of Catu

- Flag Coat of arms

- Location of Catu
- Coordinates: 12°20′59″S 38°22′59″W
- Country: Brazil
- Region: Northeast
- State: Bahia

Area
  - Total: 426.955 km^{2} (164.848 sq mi)
- Elevation: 100 m (330 ft)

Population (2020)
  - Total: 54,970
  - Density: 122.72/km^{2} (317.8/sq mi)
- Time zone: UTC−3 (BRT)

Catu is a city in Bahia, Brazil. Its population is 54,970 as of 2020. It is located at 12°20′59″S 38°22′59″W.

Catu is a prosperous city, with a prominent petroleum and commercial sector, both of which are equally well developed. It is known for its irregular topography and is located on the BR-110 between Salvador and Alagoinhas, approximately 78 km from the former and 32 km from the latter. It is part of Salvador's Metropolitan Region.

== Origins ==
When the Portuguese arrived in Bahia, the Patachó and Tupiniquim indigenous peoples inhabited the territory where the city is now situated. These early inhabitants moved inland to the sertão, in order to escape Portuguese persecution.

Up to 1782 historical facts are few and imprecise. The area where the city of Catu was built on is known to have integrated the captaincy of the count da Ponte, whereto many colonists migrated. It was left to the Catholic Church to take the first steps towards the foundation of the parish of Santa do Catu, enclosing the vast territory.

In 1787, the then 12th Archbishop of Bahia, Dom Antônio Correia, founded the parish. Nearly half a century later, on July 23, 1830, priest João Nepomuceno Moreira de Pinho, the vicars of Santana do Catu and of Alagoinhas met to remove the limits of their parishes and came to an agreement. The new divisions were recognized on June 26, 1863, by the president of the Province, Dr. José Bonifácio Basconcelos de Azambuja.

Santana do Catu became a city on July 26, 1868.

== Administration ==
With the inception of provincial law number 1058 on July 26, 1868, the municipality of Santana do Catu was created, containing territory from the previously called Vila de São Francisco.

In the administrative division of 1911 Brazil, the municipality was composed of the districts Santana do Catu (main district), Pojuca and São Miguel, losing Pojuca with law number 979 of July 29, 1913, which promoted the district to a municipality. Santana de Catu had its name simplified by the state Decree number 7455 of July 23, 1931, which was validated by the Decree number 7479, of July 8 of the same year. It was promoted to a city on March 30, 1938.

Since state Decree number 11089 of November 30, 1938, Catu has been composed of three districts: Catu (main district), Bela Flor (formerly São Miguel) and Sítio Novo, and since May 29, 1966 it has been the headquarters of Comarca.
