= Palmeiras Nordeste Futebol =

Palmeiras Nordeste
- Full name: Palmeiras Nordeste Futebol
- Founded: August 22, 2000
- Dissolved: 2005
- Ground: Estádio Joia da Princesa, Feira de Santana, Bahia state, Brazil
- Capacity: 16,274
Home colors	Away colors

Palmeiras Nordeste Futebol, commonly known as Palmeiras Nordeste, was a Brazilian football club based in Feira de Santana, Bahia state. They competed in the Série C once. The club was formerly known as Associação Atlética Independente.

== History ==
The club was founded on August 22, 2000 as Associação Atlética Independente. Palmeiras Nordeste won the Campeonato Baiano Second Level in 2001. After joining a partnership with Sociedade Esportiva Palmeiras of São Paulo in 2002, the club was renamed to Palmeiras Nordeste Futebol. The club competed in the Série C in 2002, when they were eliminated in the First Stage of the competition. The club won the Taça Estado da Bahia in 2003. Palmeiras Nordeste folded a few years after their partnership with Sociedade Esportiva Palmeiras ended.

== Honours ==
- Taça Estado da Bahia
  - Winners (1): 2003
- Campeonato Baiano Second Division
  - Winners (1): 2001

== Stadium ==
Palmeiras Nordeste Futebol played their home games at Estádio Municipal Alberto Oliveira, nicknamed Estádio Joia da Princesa. The stadium has a maximum capacity of 16,274 people.
