= Juazeiro Social Clube =

Juazeiro
- Full name: Juazeiro Social Clube
- Nicknames: Tricolor das Carrancas; Carranca; Tricolor do Norte
- Founded: August 16, 1995
- Ground: Adauto Morais
- Capacity: 12,000
Home colors	Away colors

Juazeiro Social Clube, usually known as Juazeiro is a Brazilian football club from Juazeiro, Bahia state.

== History ==
On August 16, 1995, Juazeiro Social Clube was founded as a professional club after eight amateur clubs, América, Barro Vermelho, Carranca, Colonial, Grêmio, Olaria, XV de Novembro and Veneza, merged.

In 1996, Juazeiro won its first title, which was the Campeonato Baiano Second Level.

In 2001, the club finished as Bahia State Championship runner-up, after being defeated by Bahia in the final.

== Honours ==
- Campeonato Baiano
  - Runners-up (1): 2001
- Campeonato Baiano Second Level
  - Winners (2): 1996, 2010

== Stadium ==
Juazeiro's stadium is Estádio Adauto Morais, with a maximum capacity of 12,000 people.
