= Esporte Clube Primeiro Passo Vitória da Conquista =

Vitória da Conquista
- Full name: Esporte Clube Primeiro Passo Vitória da Conquista
- Nicknames: Bode; Bodão Alviverde
- Founded: January 21, 2005 (21 years ago)
- Ground: Lomanto Júnior, Vitória da Conquista, Bahia state, Brazil
- Capacity: 12,500
- President: Ederlane Amorim
- Head coach: Washington "Coração Valente"
- League: Campeonato Baiano Segunda Divisão
- 2025: Baiano Segunda Divisão, 6th of 10
Home colors	Away colors

Esporte Clube Primeiro Passo Vitória da Conquista, commonly referred to as Vitória da Conquista, is a Brazilian football club based in Vitória da Conquista, Bahia. The club plays in Série D, the fourth tier of Brazilian football, as well as in the Campeonato Baiano, the top level of the Bahia state football league.

They competed in the Série C in 2008, and in the Série D in 2011, 2012, 2013 and 2014.

== History ==
The club was founded on January 21, 2005. They won the Campeonato Baiano Second Level in 2006 and the Copa Governador do Estado da Bahia in 2010. Vitória da Conquista competed in the Série C in 2008, when they were eliminated in the Second Stage, and competed in the Série D in 2011, 2012, 2013 and 2014, in all occasions, being eliminated in the first stage. They won the Copa Governador do Estado da Bahia again in 2011, when they beat Atlético de Alagoinhas in the final, the same team they beat in the previous season. Vitória won the Copa Governador do Estado da Bahia again in 2012, when they beat Jacuipense in the final.

== Honours ==
- Campeonato Baiano
  - Runners-up: 2015
- Copa Governador do Estado da Bahia
  - Winners (5): 2010, 2011, 2012, 2014, 2016
- Campeonato Baiano Second Division
  - Winners (1): 2006

== Season records ==
Season	Campeonato Baiano					Copa BA	Campeonato Brasileiro			Copa do Brasil
Season	Division	Format	Stage	Position	Position	Copa BA	Division	Stage	Position	Copa do Brasil
2006	B	2g5-g4–2	Final	Champion						
2007	A	g12-g4	First Stage	8th						
2008	A	g12-g4	Final 4	3rd		-	C	2nd Stage (8*4er)	3rd, 21st	
2009	A	g12–4	First Stage	5th		RU				
2010	A	2g6–2g4–4	Second Stage	3rd	5th	CH				
2011	A	2g6–2g4–4	Second Stage	3rd	5th	CH	D	in first stage		

References: rsssfbrasil

== Stadium ==
Esporte Clube Primeiro Passo Vitória da Conquista play their home games at Lomanto Júnior. The stadium has a maximum capacity of 12,500 people.
