= Colo Colo de Futebol e Regatas =

Colo Colo
- Full name: Colo Colo de Futebol e Regatas
- Nickname(s): Tigrão (Big Tiger)
- Founded: April 3, 1948; 77 years ago
- Ground: Estádio Mário Pessoa
- Capacity: 10,000
Home colors	Away colors

Colo Colo de Futebol e Regatas, usually known simply as Colo Colo, is a football club from Ilhéus, Bahia, Brazil. Colo-Colo was champion of the Campeonato Baiano, Bahia football league, in 2006.

== History ==
On April 3, 1948, the club was founded by a group of sportsmen led by Airton Adami.

In 1999, Colo Colo won its first title, the Campeonato Baiano Second Division, thus being promoted to the following year's first division. In the final, the club beat Fluminense de Feira.

In 2001, Colo Colo competed in the Campeonato Brasileiro Série C for the first time. The club was eliminated in the first stage.

In 2006, Colo Colo won its most important title, the Campeonato Baiano. The club defeated Vitória in both competition's stage finals, thus avoiding a final stage. In the first stage's final first leg Colo Colo and Vitória drew 1–1, and in the second leg, Colo Colo won 1–0. In the second stage's final first leg, at home, Colo Colo beat Vitória 4–3. In the second leg, in Salvador city, Colo Colo surprisingly beat its rival 4–2. After the conquer of the championship, the coach and most of the team were signed to major football clubs in Bahia, like Vitória or Bahia.

== Honours ==
=== State ===
- Campeonato Baiano
  - Winners (1): 2006
- Campeonato Baiano Second Division
  - Winners (3): 1999, 2014, 2024

=== City ===
- Campeonato Ilheense
  - Winners (6): 1953, 1958, 1959, 1960, 1961, 1997

== Stadium ==
Colo Colo's home stadium is Estádio Mário Pessoa. The stadium's maximum capacity is 10,000 people.

== Colors and logo ==
The club's colors are blue, yellow and white. Colo Colo is nicknamed Tigrão, meaning Big Tiger. The nickname is in the club's logo. The club's mascot is a tiger, also depicted in the logo. The club is named after the traditional Chilean club Colo-Colo, however the club's colors and home kit were chosen after the successful Argentine club Boca Juniors. In 1948, the club's director, José Haroldo de Castro traveled to Argentina, and bought a Boca Juniors strip. The kit's design was then adopted by the club.
