= Jequié =

Municipality of Bahia, Brazil

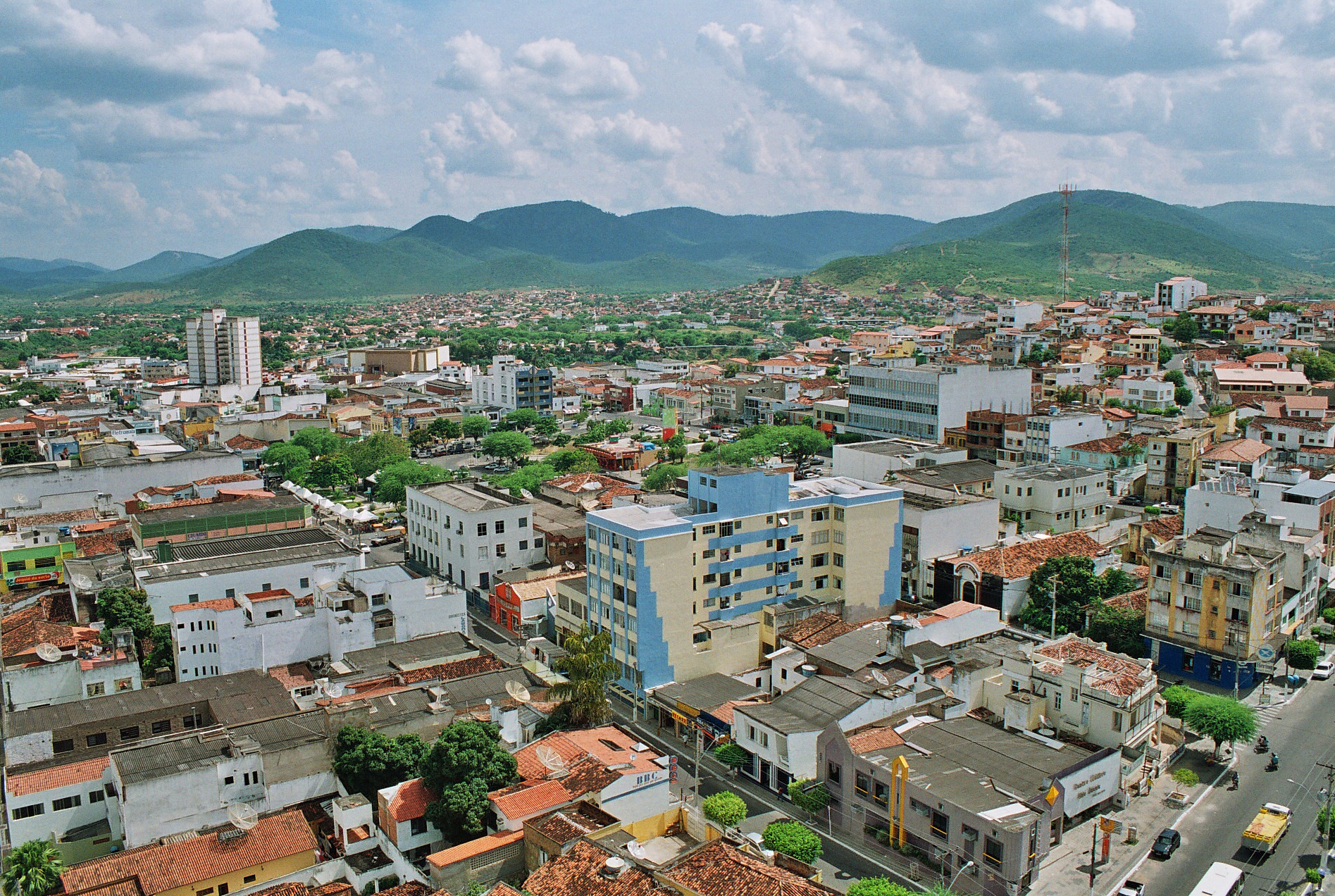
- Jequié

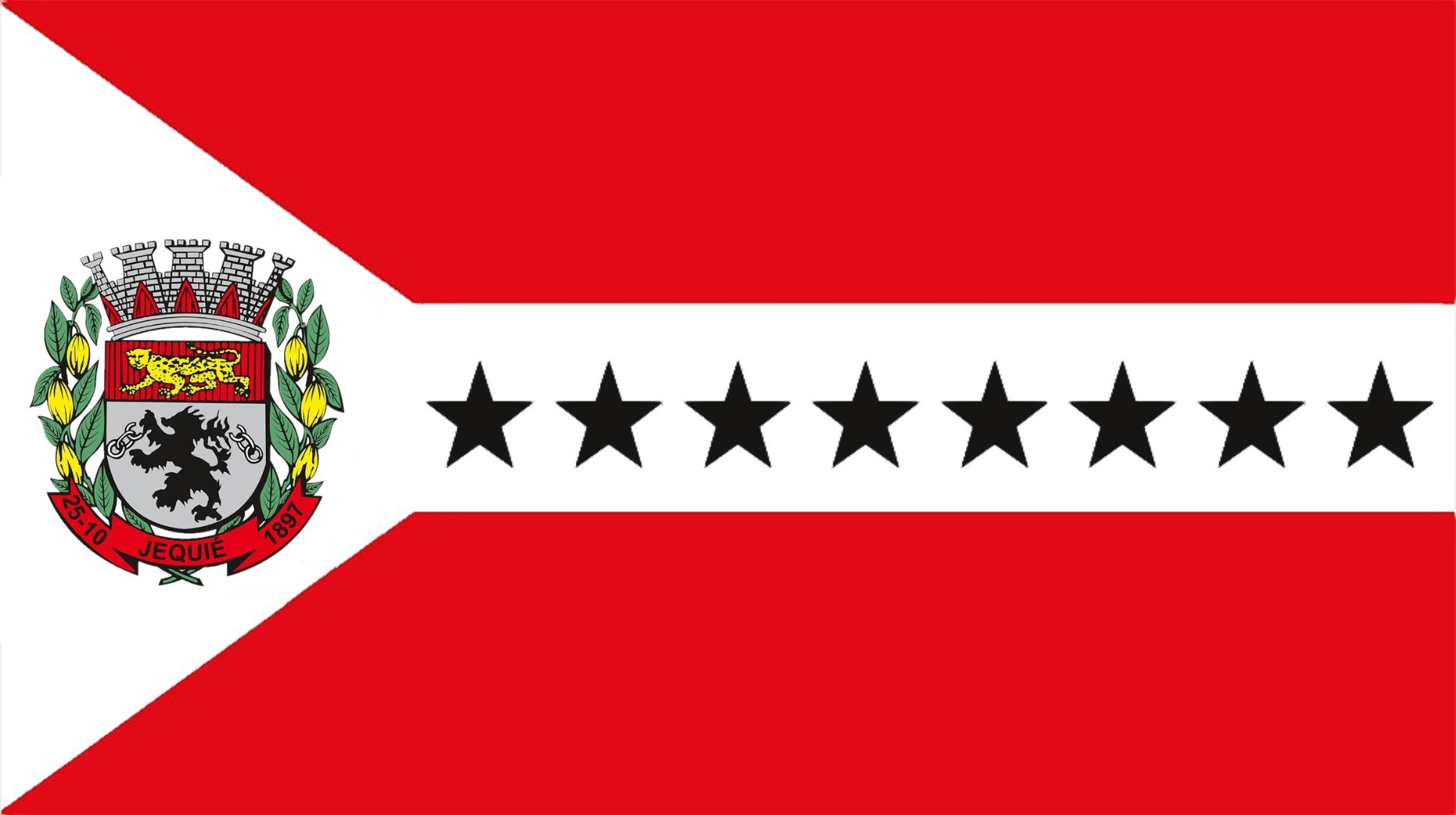
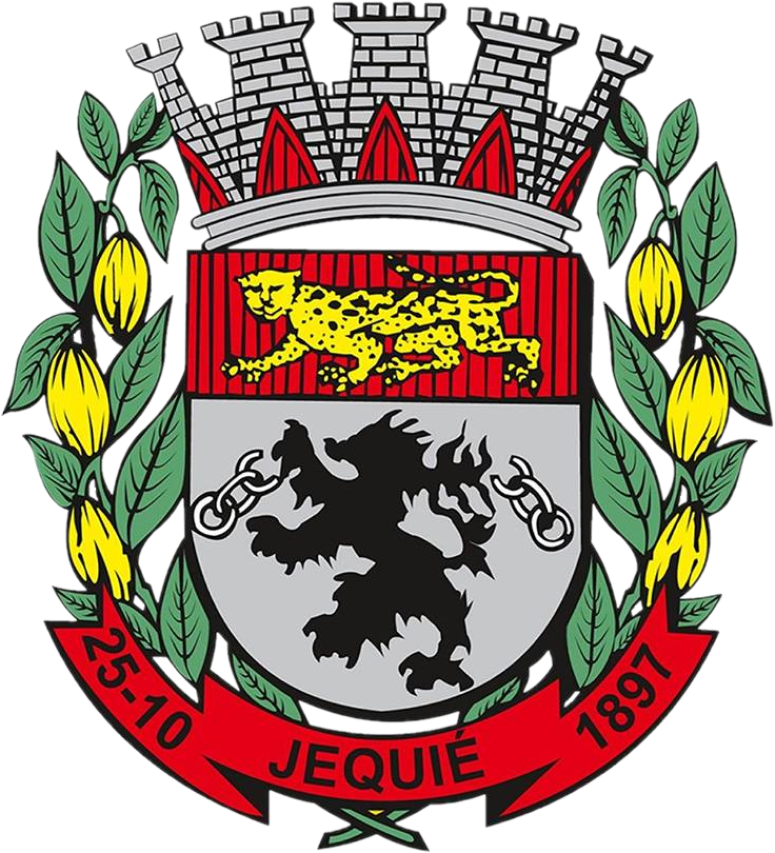
- Flag Coat of arms

- Location within Brazil
- Coordinates: 13.8630°S 40.0843°W
- Country: Brazil
- Region: Nordeste
- State: Bahia

Government

Area
  - Total: 2,969.034 km^{2} (1,146.350 sq mi)

Population (2022 Census)
  - Total: 158,813
  - Estimate (2025): 169,201
  - Density: 53.4898/km^{2} (138.538/sq mi)
- Time zone: UTC−3 (BRT)

Jequié is a city in the state of Bahia, Brazil. Jequié is 365 km away from Salvador, in the Southwest region of Bahia. It is nicknamed "Cidade Sol", meaning "The Sun City" because of its high temperatures. Surrounded by mountains, the city suffers with the heat during the whole year. Jequié is rich on Iron Ore. It is also known as "Chicago Baiana".

It is located between the Atlantic Forest and the Caatinga.

== Climate ==
Climate data for Jequié
Month	Jan	Feb	Mar	Apr	May	Jun	Jul	Aug	Sep	Oct	Nov	Dec	Year
Mean daily maximum °C (°F)	31.3 (88.3)	31.6 (88.9)	31.4 (88.5)	29.9 (85.8)	28.0 (82.4)	26.8 (80.2)	26.0 (78.8)	26.8 (80.2)	28.2 (82.8)	30.0 (86.0)	30.3 (86.5)	30.7 (87.3)	29.3 (84.7)
Daily mean °C (°F)	25.8 (78.4)	26.2 (79.2)	26.3 (79.3)	25.0 (77.0)	23.2 (73.8)	22.1 (71.8)	21.5 (70.7)	21.8 (71.2)	23.1 (73.6)	24.6 (76.3)	24.9 (76.8)	25.4 (77.7)	24.2 (75.6)
Mean daily minimum °C (°F)	20.9 (69.6)	21.1 (70.0)	21.2 (70.2)	20.6 (69.1)	19.1 (66.4)	17.8 (64.0)	17.1 (62.8)	17.1 (62.8)	18.2 (64.8)	19.6 (67.3)	20.6 (69.1)	20.8 (69.4)	19.5 (67.1)
Average precipitation mm (inches)	57.9 (2.28)	75.5 (2.97)	90.6 (3.57)	75.3 (2.96)	38.9 (1.53)	34.7 (1.37)	38.1 (1.50)	32.4 (1.28)	20.1 (0.79)	40.6 (1.60)	105.0 (4.13)	85.4 (3.36)	688.9 (27.12)
Source: Universidade Federal de Campina Grande

== Gallery ==
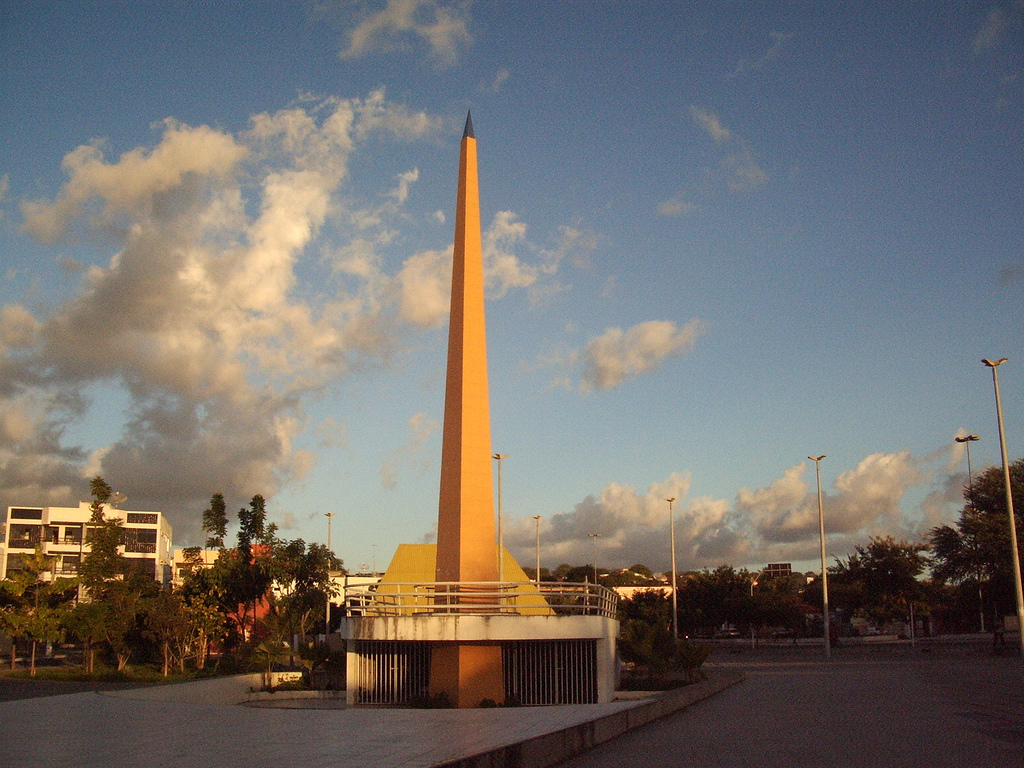
Obelisk of Jequié

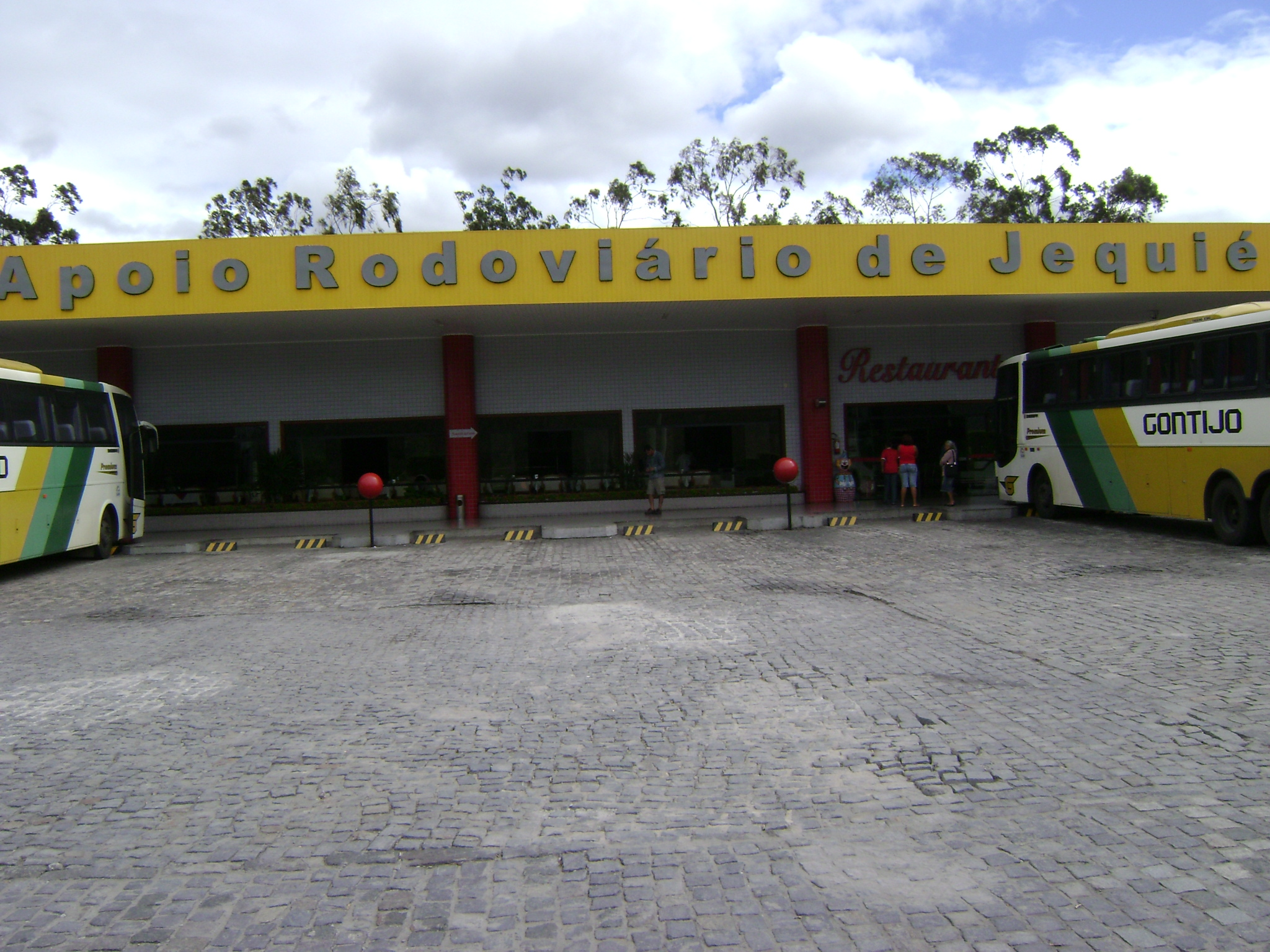
Road Support of Jequié
