= Esporte Clube Ipitanga da Bahia =

Ipitanga
- Full name: Esporte Clube Ipitanga da Bahia Ltda.
- Founded: September 20, 2003
- Ground: Estádio Municipal Pedro Amorim Duarte, Senhor do Bonfim, Bahia state, Brazil
- Capacity: 6,000
Home colours	Away colours	colours

Esporte Clube Ipitanga da Bahia Ltda., commonly known as Ipitanga, is a Brazilian football club based in Senhor do Bonfim, Bahia state. They competed in the Série C twice.

== History ==
The club was founded on September 20, 2003, in Lauro de Freitas. Ipitanga won the Campeonato Baiano Second Level in 2004. The club moved to Terra Nova in 2005, then played in Madre de Deus from 2006 to 2007. They competed in the Série C for the first time in 2005, when they were eliminated in the First Stage of the competition, competing again in 2006, when they were eliminated in the First Stage of the competition.

== Achievements ==
- Campeonato Baiano Second Level:
  - Winners (1): 2004

== Stadium ==
Esporte Clube Ipitanga da Bahia play their home games at Estádio Municipal Pedro Amorim Duarte. The stadium has a maximum capacity of 6,000 people.

The club played at Estádio Municipal de Lauro de Freitas from 2003 to 2005. The stadium has a maximum capacity of 6,000 people.
