= Sociedade Desportiva Juazeirense =

Juazeirense
- Full name: Sociedade Desportiva Juazeirense
- Nickname: Cancão de Fogo (Eagle of Fire)
- Founded: 12 December 2006; 19 years ago
- Ground: Estádio Adauto Moraes
- Capacity: 8,000
- President: Roberto Carlos Leal
- Head coach: Aroldo Moreira
- League: Campeonato Brasileiro Série D Campeonato Baiano
- 2025 2025: Série D, 24th of 64; Baiano, 6th of 10
- Website: juazeirense.com.br
| Home colors | Away colors |

Sociedade Desportiva Juazeirense, or simply Juazeirense, is a Brazilian professional football club based in Juazeiro, Bahia. It competes in the Série D, the fourth tier of Brazilian football, as well as in the Campeonato Baiano, the top flight of the Bahia state football league.

== History ==
Logo utilized until 2025.

The club was founded on 12 December 2006. Juazeirense won the Campeonato Baiano Second Level in 2011, after beating Itabuna in the final.

== Honours ==
- Campeonato Baiano Second Division
  - Winners (1): 2011

== Stadium ==
Sociedade Desportiva Juazeirense play their home games at Estádio Municipal Adauto Moraes. The stadium has a maximum capacity of 8,000 people.
