= Associação Desportiva Bahia de Feira =

Brazilian football club based in Feira de Santana, Brazil

Bahia de Feira
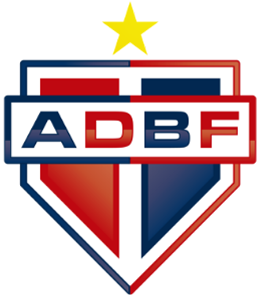
- Full name: Associação Desportiva Bahia de Feira
- Nicknames: Cangaceiro; Feira; Tremendão; Time da Tradição
- Founded: 2 July 1937; 88 years ago
- Ground: Arena Cajueiro
- Capacity: 16,274
- President: Thiago Santana Oliveira Souza
- League: Campeonato Baiano
- 2025: Baiano Segunda Divisão, 1st of 10 (champions)
- Website: www.bahiadefeira.com.br

Associação Desportiva Bahia de Feira, commonly referred to as Bahia de Feira, is a Brazilian football club based in Feira de Santana, Bahia. The club plays in Copa Governador Do Estado Da Bahia, the fourth tier of Brazilian football, as well as in the Campeonato Baiano, the top level of the Bahia state football league.

== History ==
The club was founded on 2 July 1937. Bahia de Feira won the Campeonato Baiano Second Level in 1982, 1986, and in 2009. They won the Campeonato Baiano in 2011, after beating Vitória in the final. Bahia de Feira competed in the Série D in 2011, when they were eliminated in the First Stage of the competition.

== Honours ==
- Campeonato Baiano
  - Winners (1): 2011
  - Runners-up (2): 2019, 2021
- Copa Governador do Estado da Bahia
  - Winners (1): 2013
- Campeonato Baiano Second Division
  - Winners (4): 1982, 1986, 2009, 2025
- Torneio Início Baiano
  - Winners (1): 2011

== Stadium ==
Associação Desportiva Bahia de Feira play their home games at Estádio Municipal Alberto Oliveira, nicknamed Estádio Joia da Princesa. The stadium has a maximum capacity of 16,274 people.
