= Alagoinhas Atlético Clube =

Association football club in Brazil

Atlético de Alagoinhas
- Full name: Alagoinhas Atlético Clube
- Nicknames: Carcará (Caracara); Alagoinhas
- Founded: 2 April 1970; 56 years ago
- Ground: Carneirão
- Capacity: 18,000
- President: Albino Leite
- League: Campeonato Brasileiro Série D Campeonato Baiano
- 2025: Baiano, 4th of 10
Home colours	Away colours

Alagoinhas Atlético Clube, commonly referred to as Atlético de Alagoinhas, is a Brazilian football club based in Alagoinhas, Bahia. The club plays in Série D, the fourth tier of Brazilian football, as well as in the Campeonato Baiano, the top level of the Bahia state football league. They won this league in 2022.

They competed in the 1972 Campeonato Brasileiro Série B, in the 2004 Série C and in the 2009 Série D.

== History ==
Alagoinhas Atlético Clube were founded on 2 April 1970, by a group of sportsmen. Their first official game was a 2–0 win against Leônico, played a year later. Atlético reached the semifinal level in the Série B in 1972, and were eliminated in the first stage in the Série C in 2004, and in the Série D in 2009.

== Stadium ==
Atlético de Alagoinhas play their home games at Carneirão. The stadium has a maximum capacity of 18,000 people.

== League and cup history ==
  - Série D: 37th – relegated
  - 4th – eliminated at the first stage
- 2010: 6th (state), 2nd (state cup)
- 2011: 11th (state), 2nd (state cup)
- 2012: 6th (state), 3rd (state cup)
- 2013: 12th – relegated

== Honours ==
=== Official tournaments ===
State
Competitions	Titles	Seasons
Campeonato Baiano	2	2021, 2022
Campeonato Baiano Second Division	1	2018

=== Runners-up ===
- Campeonato Baiano (2): 1973, 2020
- Copa Governador do Estado da Bahia (2): 2010, 2011
- Campeonato Baiano Second Division (4): 1977, 1983, 1993, 1998

== Statistics ==
- Best position: Semifinal Stage of Série B: 3rd place (1972)

== Current squad ==
As of 31 May 2026

Note: Flags indicate national team as defined under FIFA eligibility rules; some limited exceptions apply. Players may hold more than one non-FIFA nationality.

No.	Pos.	Nation	Player
1	GK	BRA	Mateus
2	DF	BRA	Hernandes
3	DF	BRA	Guilherme Queiroz
4	DF	BRA	Jailton
6	DF	BRA	Cicero Matheus
7	FW	BRA	Higor Farias
8	MF	BRA	Everson Ribeiro
9	FW	BRA	João Leonardo
10	FW	BRA	Esquerdinha
11	DF	BRA	Jefferson
12	GK	BRA	Gabriel Bartelli
13	DF	BRA	Jadson
14	DF	BRA	Fellipe Kayrê
15	MF	BRA	Everton
16	MF	BRA	Kaio Ribeiro
17	DF	BRA	Ryan Rocha
18	FW	BRA	Walter
19	FW	BRA	Gleydisson
20	FW	BRA	Ruan Teles
—	GK	BRA	Neto Barbosa
—	GK	BRA	Jordan
—	GK	BRA	Leonardo
—	DF	BRA	Marquinhos

No.	Pos.	Nation	Player
—	DF	BRA	Lucas Barboza
—	DF	BRA	Anderson Santos
—	DF	BRA	Pessi
—	DF	BRA	Maksuel Pereira
—	DF	BRA	Van
—	DF	BRA	Cordeiro
—	DF	BRA	Pedro Victor
—	DF	BRA	Gabriel de Lima
—	MF	BRA	Rafael Augusto
—	MF	BRA	Macajuba
—	MF	BRA	Miller Dias
—	MF	BRA	Fabiano Santiago
—	DF	BRA	Henrique Marcos
—	MF	BRA	Paulo Victor
—	FW	BRA	Juan Xavier
—	FW	BRA	Kevin Chaves
—	FW	BRA	Michael
—	FW	BRA	Douglas Barbosa
—	DF	BRA	Samuel
—	FW	BRA	Nalbert Cauã
—	MF	BRA	Julian Suzuki
—	FW	BRA	Jeferson

== CBF ranking ==
- Position: 148th
- Points: 32

== Former managers ==
- (Brazil) Antônio Dumas (2007–2008)
