= 2013 Copa do Brasil =

Copa Perdigão do Brasil 2013

Tournament details
- Country: Brazil
- Dates: 27 February – 27 November
- Teams: 87

Final positions
- Champions: Flamengo
- Runners-up: Atlético Paranaense

Tournament statistics
- Matches played: 158
- Goals scored: 364 (2.3 per match)
- Top goal scorer: Hernane (8 goals)

The 2013 Copa do Brasil (officially the 2013 Copa Perdigão do Brasil for sponsorship reasons) was the 25th edition of the Copa do Brasil. It began on February 27 and ended on November 27. The competition was contested by 87 teams, either qualified through participating in their respective state championships (71), by the CBF Rankings (10) or those qualified for 2013 Copa Libertadores (6). Clubs that qualify for the 2013 Copa Libertadores entered the competition in the Round of 16. The best 8 teams of 2012 Campeonato Brasileiro eliminated up to the third round qualifies for 2013 Copa Sudamericana which was contested in the second half of 2013.

== Format ==
The competition is a single elimination knockout tournament featuring two-legged ties. In the first two rounds, if the away team wins the first match by 2 or more goals, it progresses straight to the next round avoiding the second leg. The away goals rule is also used in the Copa do Brasil. The winner qualifies for the 2014 Copa Libertadores.

== Qualified teams ==
Teams in bold qualified for 2013 Copa Libertadores and entered directly in the Round of 16.

Association	Team (Berth)	Qualification method
(Acre (state)) Acre; 2 berths
(Acre (state)) Acre; 2 berths	Rio Branco	2012 Campeonato Acreano champions
(Acre (state)) Acre; 2 berths	Atlético Acreano	2012 Campeonato Acreano runners-up
(Alagoas) Alagoas; 3 berths
(Alagoas) Alagoas; 3 berths	CRB	2012 Campeonato Alagoano champions
(Alagoas) Alagoas; 3 berths	ASA	2012 Campeonato Alagoano runners-up
(Alagoas) Alagoas; 3 berths	CSA	2012 Campeonato Alagoano 3rd place
(Amapá) Amapá; 1 berth	Oratório	2012 Campeonato Amapaense champions
(Amazonas (Brazilian state)) Amazonas; 2 berths
(Amazonas (Brazilian state)) Amazonas; 2 berths	Nacional	2012 Campeonato Amazonense champions
(Amazonas (Brazilian state)) Amazonas; 2 berths	Fast Clube	2012 Campeonato Amazonense runners-up
(Bahia) Bahia; 3 berths
(Bahia) Bahia; 3 berths	Bahia	2012 Campeonato Baiano champions
(Bahia) Bahia; 3 berths	Vitória	2012 Campeonato Baiano runners-up
(Bahia) Bahia; 3 berths	Vitória da Conquista	2012 Copa Governador do Estado da Bahia champions
(Ceará) Ceará; 3 berths
(Ceará) Ceará; 3 berths	Ceará	2012 Campeonato Cearense champions
(Ceará) Ceará; 3 berths	Fortaleza	2012 Campeonato Cearense runners-up
(Ceará) Ceará; 3 berths	Guarani de Juazeiro	2012 Copa Fares Lopes champions
Espírito Santo; 2 berths
Espírito Santo; 2 berths	Aracruz	2012 Campeonato Capixaba champions
Espírito Santo; 2 berths	Desportiva	2012 Copa Espírito Santo champions
(Federal District (Brazil)) Federal District; 3 berths
(Federal District (Brazil)) Federal District; 3 berths	Ceilândia	2012 Campeonato Brasiliense champions
(Federal District (Brazil)) Federal District; 3 berths	Luziânia	2012 Campeonato Brasiliense runners-up
(Federal District (Brazil)) Federal District; 3 berths	Sobradinho	2012 Campeonato Brasiliense 3rd place
(Goiás) Goiás; 3 berths
(Goiás) Goiás; 3 berths	Goiás	2012 Campeonato Goiano champions
(Goiás) Goiás; 3 berths	Atlético Goianiense	2012 Campeonato Goiano runners-up
(Goiás) Goiás; 3 berths	CRAC	2012 Campeonato Goiano 3rd place
(Maranhão) Maranhão; 2 berths
(Maranhão) Maranhão; 2 berths	Sampaio Corrêa	2012 Campeonato Maranhense champions
(Maranhão) Maranhão; 2 berths	Maranhão	2012 Copa União do Maranhão champions
(Mato Grosso) Mato Grosso; 2 berths
(Mato Grosso) Mato Grosso; 2 berths	Luverdense	2012 Campeonato Mato-Grossense champions
(Mato Grosso) Mato Grosso; 2 berths	Mixto	2012 Copa Governador de Mato Grosso champions
Mato Grosso do Sul 2 berths
Mato Grosso do Sul 2 berths	Águia Negra	2012 Campeonato Sul-Mato-Grossense champions
Mato Grosso do Sul 2 berths	Naviraiense	2012 Campeonato Sul-Mato-Grossense runners-up
(Minas Gerais) Minas Gerais; 4+1+1 berths
(Minas Gerais) Minas Gerais; 4+1+1 berths	**Atlético Mineiro**	**2012 Série A runners-up**
(Minas Gerais) Minas Gerais; 4+1+1 berths	América	2012 Campeonato Mineiro runners-up
(Minas Gerais) Minas Gerais; 4+1+1 berths	Tupi	2012 Campeonato Mineiro 3rd place
(Minas Gerais) Minas Gerais; 4+1+1 berths	Cruzeiro	2012 Campeonato Mineiro 4th place
(Minas Gerais) Minas Gerais; 4+1+1 berths	Boa Esporte	2012 Taça Minas Gerais champions
(Minas Gerais) Minas Gerais; 4+1+1 berths	Betim^{Note MG} (CBF)	7th best team in CBF-Ranking not already qualifies
(Pará) Pará; 3+1 berths
(Pará) Pará; 3+1 berths	Cametá	2012 Campeonato Paraense champions
(Pará) Pará; 3+1 berths	Remo	2012 Campeonato Paraense runners-up
(Pará) Pará; 3+1 berths	Águia de Marabá	2012 Campeonato Paraense 3rd place
(Pará) Pará; 3+1 berths	Paysandu (CBF)	9th best team in CBF-Ranking not already qualifies
(Paraíba) Paraíba; 2 berths
(Paraíba) Paraíba; 2 berths	Campinense	2012 Campeonato Paraibano champions
(Paraíba) Paraíba; 2 berths	Sousa^{Note PB}	2012 Campeonato Paraibano runners-up
(Paraná (state)) Paraná; 4+1 berths
(Paraná (state)) Paraná; 4+1 berths	Coritiba	2012 Campeonato Paranaense champions
(Paraná (state)) Paraná; 4+1 berths	Atlético Paranaense	2012 Campeonato Paranaense runners-up
(Paraná (state)) Paraná; 4+1 berths	Arapongas	2012 Campeonato Paranaense 3rd place
(Paraná (state)) Paraná; 4+1 berths	Cianorte	2012 Campeonato Paranaense 4th place
(Paraná (state)) Paraná; 4+1 berths	Paraná (CBF)	3rd best team in CBF-Ranking not already qualified
(Pernambuco) Pernambuco; 3+1 berths
(Pernambuco) Pernambuco; 3+1 berths	Santa Cruz	2012 Campeonato Pernambucano champions
(Pernambuco) Pernambuco; 3+1 berths	Sport	2012 Campeonato Pernambucano runners-up
(Pernambuco) Pernambuco; 3+1 berths	Salgueiro	2012 Campeonato Pernambucano 3rd place
(Pernambuco) Pernambuco; 3+1 berths	Náutico (CBF)	Best team in CBF-Ranking not already qualified
(Piauí) Piauí; 2 berths
(Piauí) Piauí; 2 berths	Parnahyba	2012 Campeonato Piauiense champions
(Piauí) Piauí; 2 berths	Flamengo	2012 Copa Piauí champions
(Rio de Janeiro (state)) Rio de Janeiro; 5+2 berths
(Rio de Janeiro (state)) Rio de Janeiro; 5+2 berths	**Fluminense**	**2012 Série A champions**
(Rio de Janeiro (state)) Rio de Janeiro; 5+2 berths	**Vasco da Gama**	**2012 Série A 5th place**
(Rio de Janeiro (state)) Rio de Janeiro; 5+2 berths	Botafogo	2012 Campeonato Carioca runners-up
(Rio de Janeiro (state)) Rio de Janeiro; 5+2 berths	Flamengo	2012 Campeonato Carioca 3rd place
(Rio de Janeiro (state)) Rio de Janeiro; 5+2 berths	Resende	2012 Campeonato Carioca 5th place
(Rio de Janeiro (state)) Rio de Janeiro; 5+2 berths	Volta Redonda	2012 Campeonato Carioca 6th place
(Rio de Janeiro (state)) Rio de Janeiro; 5+2 berths	Bangu	2012 Copa Rio runners-up
(Rio Grande do Norte) Rio Grande do Norte; 3 berths
(Rio Grande do Norte) Rio Grande do Norte; 3 berths	América	2012 Campeonato Potiguar champions
(Rio Grande do Norte) Rio Grande do Norte; 3 berths	ABC	2012 Campeonato Potiguar runners-up
(Rio Grande do Norte) Rio Grande do Norte; 3 berths	Santa Cruz	2013 Copa FNF champions
(Rio Grande do Sul) Rio Grande do Sul; 4+1 berths
(Rio Grande do Sul) Rio Grande do Sul; 4+1 berths	**Grêmio**	**2012 Série A 3rd place**
(Rio Grande do Sul) Rio Grande do Sul; 4+1 berths	Internacional	2012 Campeonato Gaúcho champions
(Rio Grande do Sul) Rio Grande do Sul; 4+1 berths	Caxias	2012 Campeonato Gaúcho runners-up
(Rio Grande do Sul) Rio Grande do Sul; 4+1 berths	Veranópolis	2012 Campeonato Gaúcho 4th place
(Rio Grande do Sul) Rio Grande do Sul; 4+1 berths	Brasil de Pelotas	2012 Copa FGF runners-up
(Rondônia) Rondônia; 1 berth	Ji-Paraná	2012 Campeonato Rondoniense champions
(Roraima) Roraima; 1 berth	São Raimundo	2012 Campeonato Roraimense champions
(São Paulo (state)) São Paulo; 5+2+5 berths
(São Paulo (state)) São Paulo; 5+2+5 berths	**Corinthians**	**2012 Copa Libertadores champions**
(São Paulo (state)) São Paulo; 5+2+5 berths	**Palmeiras**	**2012 Copa do Brasil champions**
(São Paulo (state)) São Paulo; 5+2+5 berths	~~São Paulo~~^{Note SP}	~~2012 Série A 4th place~~
(São Paulo (state)) São Paulo; 5+2+5 berths	Santos	2012 Campeonato Paulista champions
(São Paulo (state)) São Paulo; 5+2+5 berths	Guarani	2012 Campeonato Paulista runners-up
(São Paulo (state)) São Paulo; 5+2+5 berths	Ponte Preta	2012 Campeonato Paulista 4th place
(São Paulo (state)) São Paulo; 5+2+5 berths	São Bernardo	2012 Campeonato Paulista Série A2 champions
(São Paulo (state)) São Paulo; 5+2+5 berths	Noroeste	2012 Copa Paulista champions
(São Paulo (state)) São Paulo; 5+2+5 berths	Portuguesa (CBF)	2nd best team in CBF-Ranking not already qualified
(São Paulo (state)) São Paulo; 5+2+5 berths	Grêmio Barueri (CBF)	4th best team in CBF-Ranking not already qualified
(São Paulo (state)) São Paulo; 5+2+5 berths	São Caetano (CBF)	6th best team in CBF-Ranking not already qualified
(São Paulo (state)) São Paulo; 5+2+5 berths	Bragantino (CBF)	8th best team in CBF-Ranking not already qualified
(São Paulo (state)) São Paulo; 5+2+5 berths	Santo André (CBF)	10th best team in CBF-Ranking not already qualified
(Santa Catarina (state)) Santa Catarina; 3+1 berths
(Santa Catarina (state)) Santa Catarina; 3+1 berths	Avaí	2012 Campeonato Catarinense champions
(Santa Catarina (state)) Santa Catarina; 3+1 berths	Figueirense	2012 Campeonato Catarinense runners-up
(Santa Catarina (state)) Santa Catarina; 3+1 berths	Joinville	2012 Copa Santa Catarina champions
(Santa Catarina (state)) Santa Catarina; 3+1 berths	Criciúma (CBF)	5th best team in CBF-Ranking not already qualified
(Sergipe) Sergipe; 2 berths
(Sergipe) Sergipe; 2 berths	Itabaiana	2012 Campeonato Sergipano champions
(Sergipe) Sergipe; 2 berths	Confiança	2012 Copa Governo do Estado de Sergipe champions
(Tocantins) Tocantins; 1 berth	Gurupi	2012 Campeonato Tocantinense champions

Notes

- Minas Gerais (MG): Formerly known as Ipatinga FC until 2012.
- Paraíba (PB): Originally, CSP had qualified as 2012 Copa Paraíba champion, but the team was disqualified by the Brazilian Superior Court of Sports Justice (STJD) and replaced by Sousa.
- São Paulo (SP): São Paulo qualified to 2013 Copa Sudamericana as 2012 Copa Sudamericana champions. CBF announced that Vasco da Gama (2012 Série A 5th) entered in his berth due to scheduling conflicts.

== Preliminary round ==
Team 1	Agg.	Team 2	1st leg	2nd leg
Desportiva (Espírito Santo)	6–5	(Acre (state)) Atlético Acreano	1–1	5–4

=== First leg ===
27 February	Atlético Acreano	1–1	Desportiva	Arena da Floresta, Rio Branco
20:00 UTC−03:00	Luna 90'	Report	Leo Oliveira 41'	Attendance: 484; Referee: Edmar Campos da Encarnacão (Amazonas)

=== Second leg ===
13 March	Desportiva	5–4	Atlético Acreano	Estádio Alencar Araripe, Cariacica
20:30 UTC−03:00	David Dener 33'; Flavio Santos 45+1'; Carlos Vitor 60', 90+2'; Leo Oliveira 81'	Report	Alcione 18'; Gessé 55'; Jeferson 78'; Lelão 90+5'	Attendance: 3,293; Referee: Rodrigo Carvalhaes de Miranda (Rio de Janeiro)
Note: Desportiva won 6–5 on aggregate.

== First round ==
Team 1	Agg.	Team 2	1st leg	2nd leg
Flamengo (Rio de Janeiro (state))	4–0	(Pará) Remo	1–0	3–0
Sampaio Corrêa (Maranhão)	1–1 (6–7 p)	(Paraíba) Campinense	1–0	0–1
Ceará	4–3	(Federal District (Brazil)) Ceilândia	0–0	4–3
ASA (Alagoas)	2–1	(Rio Grande do Norte) Santa Cruz-RN	0–0	2–1
Internacional (Rio Grande do Sul)	2–0	(Acre (state)) Rio Branco	2–0	NP
Santa Cruz (Pernambuco)	4–1	(Ceará) Guarani de Juazeiro	2–1	2–0
Avaí (Santa Catarina (state))	4–2	(Rio de Janeiro (state)) Volta Redonda	0–1	4–1
América Mineiro (Minas Gerais)	3–2	(Tocantins) Gurupi	3–2	0–0
Goiás	3–1	(Amapá) Oratório	3–1	NP
Santo André (São Paulo (state))	2–1	(Rio Grande do Sul) Veranópolis	0–1	2–0
Sport Recife (Pernambuco)	3–0	(Bahia) Vitória da Conquista	1–0	2–0
ABC (Rio Grande do Norte)	3–1	(Piauí) Parnahyba	3–1	NP
Vitória (Bahia)	6–3	(Mato Grosso) Mixto	1–2	5–1
Boa Esporte (Minas Gerais)	2–4	(Pernambuco) Salgueiro	0–2	2–2
Paraná (Paraná (state))	3–4	(São Paulo (state)) São Bernardo	1–1	2–3
Criciúma (Santa Catarina (state))	3–0	(São Paulo (state)) Noroeste	0–0	3–0
Coritiba (Paraná (state))	3–0	(Paraíba) Sousa	3–0	NP
Águia de Marabá (Pará)	1–4	(Amazonas (Brazilian state)) Nacional-AM	0–2	1–2
Ponte Preta (São Paulo (state))	3–0	(Sergipe) Itabaiana	3–0	NP
Bragantino (São Paulo (state))	2–0	(Mato Grosso do Sul) Águia Negra	2–0	NP
Botafogo (Rio de Janeiro (state))	2–0	(Federal District (Brazil)) Sobradinho	0–0	2–0
CRB (Alagoas)	3–2	(Amazonas (Brazilian state)) Fast Clube	1–1	2–1
Figueirense (Santa Catarina (state))	4–1	(Espírito Santo) Desportiva	4–1	NP
São Caetano (São Paulo (state))	1–1 (1–3 p)	(Paraná (state)) Arapongas	0–1	1–0
Cruzeiro (Minas Gerais)	3–0	(Alagoas) CSA	3–0	NP
Caxias (Rio Grande do Sul)	1–2	(Rio de Janeiro (state)) Resende	1–2	0–0
Atlético Goianiense (Goiás)	7–0	(Pará) Cametá	7–0	NP
Grêmio Barueri (São Paulo (state))	1–5	(Paraná (state)) Cianorte	1–2	0–3
Atlético Paranaense (Paraná (state))	3–0	(Rio Grande do Sul) Brasil de Pelotas	1–0	2–0
América de Natal (Rio Grande do Norte)	2–0	(Rondônia) Ji-Paraná	1–0	1–0
Portuguesa (São Paulo (state))	1–1 (a)	(Mato Grosso do Sul) Naviraiense	0–0	1–1
Paysandu (Pará)	2–0	(Roraima) São Raimundo-RR	2–0	NP
Santos (São Paulo (state))	4–2	(Piauí) Flamengo-PI	2–2	2–0
Joinville (Santa Catarina (state))	2–1	(Espírito Santo) Aracruz	1–1	1–0
Náutico (Pernambuco)	2–4	(Goiás) CRAC	1–3	1–1
Betim (Minas Gerais)	3–1	(Rio de Janeiro (state)) Bangu	2–1	1–0
Bahia	2–0	Maranhão	2–0	NP
Luverdense (Mato Grosso)	3–1	(Minas Gerais) Tupi	0–1	3–0
Guarani (São Paulo (state))	1–1 (1–4 p)	(Sergipe) Confiança	0–1	1–0
Fortaleza (Ceará)	0–0 (3–2 p)	(Federal District (Brazil)) Luziânia	0–0	0–0

=== First leg ===
3 April	Ceilândia	0–0	Ceará	Estádio Abadião, Ceilândia
16:00 UTC−03:00		Report		Attendance: 1,061; Referee: Luciano Oliveira dos Santos (Tocantins)

3 April	Resende	2–1	Caxias	Estádio do Trabalhador, Resende
16:00 UTC−03:00	Kim 61'; Denilson 90+5'	Report	Rafael Santiago 15'	Attendance: 347; Referee: Flávio Rodrigues Guerra (São Paulo)

3 April	Bangu	1–2	Betim	Estádio Moça Bonita, Rio de Janeiro
16:00 UTC−03:00	Sergio Júnior 54'	Report	Robert 79'; Bruninho 87' (pen.)	Attendance: 478; Referee: Devarly Lira do Rosário (Espírito Santo)

3 April	Brasil de Pelotas	0–1	Atlético Paranaense	Estádio Bento Freitas, Pelotas
19:30 UTC−03:00		Report	Elias 45' (pen.)	Attendance: 3,316; Referee: Bráulio da Silva Machado (Santa Catarina)

3 April	Guarani de Juazeiro	1–2	Santa Cruz	Estádio Mauro Sampaio, Juazeiro do Norte
20:30 UTC−03:00	Gustavo 60'	Report	Luciano Sorriso 14'; Raul 51'	Attendance: 1,745; Referee: Renan Roberto de Souza (Paraíba)

3 April	Veranópolis	1–0	Santo André	Estádio Antônio Farina, Veranópolis
20:30 UTC−03:00	Emanuel 36'	Report		Attendance: 164; Referee: Ronan Marques da Rosa (Santa Catarina)

3 April	Noroeste	0–0	Criciúma	Estádio Alfredo de Castilho, Bauru
20:30 UTC−03:00		Report		Attendance: 548; Referee: João Lupato (Mato Grosso do Sul)

3 April	Cianorte	2–1	Grêmio Barueri	Estádio Albino Turbay, Cianorte
20:30 UTC−03:00	Jovany 44'; Maurício da Silva 81'	Report	Alê 52'	Attendance: 632; Referee: Paulo Vollkopf (Mato Grosso do Sul)

3 April	Nacional-AM	2–0	Águia de Marabá	Estádio Roberto Simonsen, Manaus
21:30 UTC−03:00	Rafael Morisco 28'; Charles 89'	Report		Attendance: 1,137; Referee: Gerválio Taigo de Carvalho Lira (Roraima)

3 April	Naviraiense	0–0	Portuguesa	Virotão, Naviraí
21:30 UTC−03:00		Report		Attendance: 962; Referee: Antônio Denival de Morais (Paraná)

3 April	Remo	0–1	Flamengo	Estádio Olímpico do Pará, Belém
22:00 UTC−03:00		Report	Rafinha 55'	Attendance: 20,493; Referee: Raphael Claus (São Paulo)

3 April	Rio Branco	0–2	Internacional	Arena da Floresta, Rio Branco
22:00 UTC−03:00		Report	Caio 65'; Forlán 90+3' (pen.)	Attendance: 6,897; Referee: Fledes Rodrigues Santos (Rondônia)
Note: Internacional advanced because they won by at least two goals as the visiting team in the first leg.

3 April	Vitória da Conquista	0–1	Sport Recife	Estádio Lomanto Júnior, Vitória da Conquista
22:00 UTC−03:00		Report	Rithely 44'	Attendance: 5,120; Referee: Cláudio Francisco Lima e Silva (Sergipe)

4 April	Itabaiana	0–3	Ponte Preta	Estádio Presidente Médici, Itabaiana
21:50 UTC−03:00		Report	Alemão 3' (pen.), 33'; Rildo 57'	Attendance: 1,101; Referee: Sebastião Rufino Ribeiro Filho (Pernambuco)
Note: Ponte Preta advanced because they won by at least two goals as the visiting team in the first leg.

10 April	Campinense	0–1	Sampaio Corrêa	Amigão, Campina Grande
20:30 UTC−03:00		Report	Edgar 90+1'	Attendance: 4,590; Referee: Leandro Saraiva Dantas de Oliveira (Rio Grande do Norte)

10 April	Santa Cruz-RN	0–0	ASA	Iberezão, Santa Cruz
20:30 UTC−03:00		Report		Attendance: 722; Referee: Éder Caxias Meneses (Paraíba)

10 April	Volta Redonda	1–0	Avaí	Estádio Raulino de Oliveira, Volta Redonda
20:30 UTC−03:00	André Alves 90'	Report		Attendance: 1,477; Referee: Vinicius Furlan (São Paulo)

10 April	Gurupi	2–3	América Mineiro	Estádio Gilberto Resende, Gurupi
20:30 UTC−03:00	Ricardo 29'; Edson Santiago 71'	Report	Nikão 19'; Fábio Júnior 32', 44'	Attendance: 1,065; Referee: Rodrigo Batista Raposo (Distrito Federal)

10 April	Oratório	1–3	Goiás	Estádio Glicério Marques, Macapá
20:30 UTC−03:00	Junior 38'	Report	Walter 51', 73'; Hugo 61' (pen.)	Attendance: 1,285; Referee: Wasley do Couto (Pará)
Note: Goiás advanced because they won by at least two goals as the visiting team in the first leg.

10 April	Salgueiro	2–0	Boa Esporte	Estádio Cornélio de Barros, Salgueiro
20:30 UTC−03:00	Elvis 6'; Pio 55'	Report		Attendance: 1,654; Referee: Avelar Rodrigo da Silva (Ceará)

10 April	Desportiva	1–4	Figueirense	Estádio Alencar Araripe, Cariacica
20:30 UTC−03:00	Flavio Santos 16'	Report	Thiego 48'; Douglas da Silva 54'; Maylson 59'; Botti 87'	Attendance: 6,779; Referee: Wagner dos Santos Rosa (Rio de Janeiro)
Note: Figueirense advanced because they won by at least two goals as the visiting team in the first leg.

10 April	Arapongas	1–0	São Caetano	Estádio dos Pássaros, Arapongas
20:30 UTC−03:00	Edu Amparo 45+1'	Report		Attendance: 3,068; Referee: Marcos Mateus Pereira (Mato Grosso do Sul)

10 April	Cametá	0–7	Atlético Goianiense	Parque do Bacurau, Cametá
20:30 UTC−03:00		Report	Robston 9', 42'; John Lennon 76', 88'; Ernandes 78'; Caio César 81'; Wiliam Barbio 89'	Attendance: 2,637; Referee: Antonio Dib Moraes de Sousa (Piauí)
Note: Atlético Goianiense advanced because they won by at least two goals as the visiting team in the first leg.

10 April	Aracruz	1–1	Joinville	Estádio do Bambu, Aracruz
20:30 UTC−03:00	Regilson 70'	Report	Marcelo Costa 11'	Attendance: 2,235; Referee: Igor Junio Benevenuto (Minas Gerais)

10 April	Tupi	1–0	Luverdense	Estádio Mário Helênio, Juiz de Fora
20:30 UTC−03:00	Dieguinho 9'	Report		Attendance: 554; Referee: Felipe Duarte Varejão (Espírito Santo)

10 April	Confiança	1–0	Guarani	Batistão, Aracaju
20:30 UTC−03:00	Da Silva 29'	Report		Attendance: 2,692; Referee: Gilberto Rodrigues Castro Júnior (Pernambuco)

10 April	Luziânia	0–0	Fortaleza	Estádio Zequinha Roriz, Luziânia
20:30 UTC−03:00		Report		Attendance: 4,136; Referee: Alício Pena Júnior (Minas Gerais)

10 April	Ji-Paraná	0–1	América de Natal	Biancão, Ji-Paraná
21:00 UTC−03:00		Report	Itamar 38'	Attendance: 557; Referee: Carlos Ronne Casas de Paiva (Acre)

10 April	São Raimundo-RR	0–2	Paysandu	Estádio Raimundo Ribeiro, Boa Vista
21:00 UTC−03:00		Report	Eduardo Ramos 24'; Heliton 28'	Attendance: 1,200; Referee: Edmar Campos da Encarnacão (Amazonas)
Note: Paysandu advanced because they won by at least two goals as the visiting team in the first leg.

10 April	Fast Clube	1–1	CRB	Estádio Roberto Simonsen, Manaus
21:30 UTC−03:00	Elielton 42'	Report	Gladstone 80'	Attendance: 647; Referee: Paulo Santos Moreira (Maranhão)

10 April	Mixto	2–1	Vitória	Estádio Presidente Dutra, Cuiabá
22:00 UTC−03:00	Soares 48'; Odail 82'	Report	Luís Alberto 15'	Attendance: 2,048; Referee: Eduardo Tomaz de Aquino Valadão (Goiás)

10 April	Águia Negra	0–2	Bragantino	Estádio Ninho da Águia, Rio Brilhante
22:00 UTC−03:00		Report	Léo Jaime 7'; Robertinho 90+3'	Attendance: 945; Referee: Leandro Júnior Hermes (Paraná)
Note: Bragantino advanced because they won by at least two goals as the visiting team in the first leg.

10 April	CSA	0–3	Cruzeiro	Estádio Rei Pelé, Maceió
22:00 UTC−03:00		Report	Diego Souza 10'; Dagoberto 54' (pen.); Ricardo Goulart 87'	Attendance: 6,111; Referee: Jaílson Macedo Freitas (Bahia)
Note: Cruzeiro advanced because they won by at least two goals as the visiting team in the first leg.

10 April	Flamengo-PI	2–2	Santos	Albertão, Teresina
22:00 UTC−03:00	Édson Di 34' (pen.), 55'	Report	Giva 26'; Montillo 31'	Attendance: 25,400; Referee: Pablo Ramon Gonçalves Pinheiro (Rio Grande do Norte)

10 April	CRAC	3–1	Náutico	Estádio Genervino da Fonseca, Catalão
22:00 UTC−03:00	Pantico 21' (pen.), 45'; Danilo 79'	Report	Alcides 90+2'	Attendance: 2,237; Referee: Alinor Silva da Paixão (Mato Grosso)

11 April	Parnahyba	1–3	ABC	Estádio Dirceu Arcoverde, Parnaíba
20:30 UTC−03:00	Damisson 25' (pen.)	Report	Marcilio 21'; Rodrigo Silva 51' (pen.), 90+2'	Attendance: 3,223; Referee: Francisco de Assis Almeida Filho (Ceará)
Note: ABC advanced because they won by at least two goals as the visiting team in the first leg.

11 April	São Bernardo	1–1	Paraná	Primeiro de Maio, São Bernardo do Campo
21:30 UTC−03:00	Bruno Gonçalves 7'	Report	Rubinho 88'	Attendance: 5,578; Referee: Roger Goulart (Rio Grande do Sul)

11 April	Maranhão	0–2	Bahia	Castelão, São Luís
21:50 UTC−03:00		Report	Magal 10'; Diones 54'	Attendance: 5,540; Referee: Wladyerisson Silva Oliveira (Ceará)
Note: Bahia advanced because they won by at least two goals as the visiting team in the first leg.

17 April	Sobradinho	0–0	Botafogo	Bezerrão, Gama
19:30 UTC−03:00		Report		Attendance: 15,042; Referee: André Luiz de Freitas Castro (Goiás)

1 May	Sousa	0–3	Coritiba	Marizão, Sousa
19:30 UTC−03:00		Report	Bonfim 38'; Júlio César 66'; Luizinho 90+3'	Attendance: 827; Referee: Cláudio Mercante Júnior (Pernambuco)
Note: Coritiba advanced because they won by at least two goals as the visiting team in the first leg.

=== Second leg ===
10 April	Santa Cruz	2–0	Guarani de Juazeiro	Estádio do Arruda, Recife
20:30 UTC−03:00	Denis Marques 13' (pen.); Everton Sena 17'	Report		Attendance: 7,087; Referee: Charles Hebert Cavalcante Ferreira (Alagoas)
Note: Santa Cruz won 4–1 on aggregate.

10 April	Águia de Marabá	1–2	Nacional-AM	Estádio Zinho de Oliveira, Marabá
20:30 UTC−03:00	Danillo Galvão 76'	Report	Felipe 66', 72'	Attendance: 368; Referee: Rogério José Bueno (Distrito Federal)
Note: Nacional-AM won 4–1 on aggregate.

10 April	Ceará	4–3	Ceilândia	Castelão, Fortaleza
22:00 UTC−03:00	Lulinha 13'; Magno Alves 19'; Potiguar 50'; Vicente 59'	Report	Clecio 11'; Rodriguinho 61'; Cassius 80'	Attendance: 6,167; Referee: Emerson Luiz Sobral (Pernambuco)
Note: Ceará won 4–3 on aggregate.

16 April	Vitória	5–1	Mixto	Barradão, Salvador
19:30 UTC−03:00	Dinei 37', 68'; Escudero 40' (pen.); Vander 81'; Marquinhos 90+3'	Report	Geovani 41'	Attendance: 5,522; Referee: Pablo dos Santos Alves (Espírito Santo)
Note: Vitória won 6–3 on aggregate.

16 April	Portuguesa	1–1	Naviraiense	Estádio do Canindé, São Paulo
21:50 UTC−03:00	Arraya 76'	Report	Paulo Sérgio 71'	Attendance: 881; Referee: Emerson de Almeida Ferreira (Minas Gerais)
Note: 1–1 on aggregate. Naviraiense won on away goals.

17 April	Santo André	2–0	Veranópolis	Estádio Bruno José Daniel, Santo André
15:00 UTC−03:00	Jardel 72'; Eliélton 86'	Report		Attendance: 792; Referee: Cleisson Veloso Pereira (Minas Gerais)
Note: Santo André won 2–1 on aggregate.

17 April	Atlético Paranaense	2–0	Brasil de Pelotas	Eco-Estádio, Curitiba
19:30 UTC−03:00	Paulo Baier 68'; Éverton 79'	Report		Attendance: 5,458; Referee: Luiz Flávio de Oliveira (São Paulo)
Note: Atlético Paranaense won 3–0 on aggregate.

17 April	Sampaio Corrêa	0–1 (6–7 p)	Campinense	Castelão, São Luís
20:30 UTC−03:00		Report	Ricardo 85'	Attendance: 19,885; Referee: Gleysto Gonçalves da Silva (Ceará)
Note: 1–1 on aggregate. Campinense won 7–6 on penalties.

17 April	América Mineiro	0–0	Gurupi	Estádio Independência, Belo Horizonte
20:30 UTC−03:00		Report		Attendance: 477; Referee: Marcos André Gomes da Penha (Espírito Santo)
Note: América won 3–2 on aggregate.

17 April	Boa Esporte	2–2	Salgueiro	Melão, Varginha
20:30 UTC−03:00	Marcelinho Paraíba 61' (pen.); Fernando 74'	Report	Alexon 56'; Peri 64'	Attendance: 762; Referee: Marcelo Aparecido de Souza (São Paulo)
Note: Salgueiro won 4–2 on aggregate.

17 April	Criciúma	3–0	Noroeste	Estádio Heriberto Hülse, Criciúma
20:30 UTC−03:00	Ivo 26'; Lins 46', 69'	Report		Attendance: 7,883; Referee: Márcio Chagas da Silva (Rio Grande do Sul)
Note: Criciúma won 3–0 on aggregate.

17 April	São Caetano	1–0 (1–3 p)	Arapongas	Anacleto Campanella, São Caetano do Sul
20:30 UTC−03:00	Gabriel 38'	Report		Attendance: 473; Referee: Rodrigo Nunes de Sá (Rio de Janeiro)
Note: 1–1 on aggregate. Arapongas won 3–1 on penalties.

17 April	Grêmio Barueri	0–3	Cianorte	Arena Barueri, Barueri
20:30 UTC−03:00		Report	Heli 45', 54'; Eydison 62'	Attendance: 649; Referee: Alício Pena Júnior (Minas Gerais)
Note: Cianorte won 5–1 on aggregate.

17 April	Joinville	1–0	Aracruz	Arena Joinville, Joinville
20:30 UTC−03:00	Marcelo Costa 45' (pen.)	Report		Attendance: 8,439; Referee: Jean Pierre Gonçalves Lima (Rio Grande do Sul)
Note: Joinville won 2–1 on aggregate.

17 April	Betim	1–0	Bangu	Arena do Jacaré, Sete Lagoas
20:30 UTC−03:00	Joelson 49'	Report		Attendance: 207; Referee: Thiago Duarte Peixoto (São Paulo)
Note: Betim won 3–1 on aggregate.

17 April	Guarani	1–0 (1–4 p)	Confiança	Estádio Major José Levy Sobrinho, Limeira
20:30 UTC−03:00	Fernando Gaúcho 90+4'	Report		Attendance: 372; Referee: Edivaldo Elias da Silva (Paraná)
Note: 1–1 on aggregate. Confiança won 4–1 on penalties.

17 April	Flamengo	3–0	Remo	Estádio Raulino de Oliveira, Volta Redonda
22:00 UTC−03:00	Hernane 36', 50', 71'	Report		Attendance: 3,614; Referee: Wagner Reway (Mato Grosso)
Note: Flamengo won 4–0 on aggregate.

17 April	Sport Recife	2–0	Vitória da Conquista	Estádio Ilha do Retiro, Recife
22:00 UTC−03:00	Marcos Aurélio 45+1' (pen.); Pelezinho 84'	Report		Attendance: 2,154; Referee: Dewson Fernando Freitas da Silva (Pará)
Note: Sport Recife won 3–0 on aggregate.

17 April	Santos	2–0	Flamengo-PI	Estádio Vila Belmiro, Santos
22:00 UTC−03:00	Rafael Galhardo 71'; Neymar 85'	Report		Attendance: 8,732; Referee: Paulo Schleich Vollkopf (Mato Grosso do Sul)
Note: Santos won 4–2 on aggregate.

17 April	Luverdense	3–0	Tupi	Passo das Emas Stadium, Lucas do Rio Verde
22:00 UTC−03:00	Tozim 15'; Rafael Tavares 28'; Marcelo Maciel 37'	Report		Attendance: 1,471; Referee: Cléber Vaz da Silva (Goiás)
Note: Luverdense won 3–1 on aggregate.

17 April	Fortaleza	0–0 (3–2 p)	Luziânia	Castelão, Fortaleza
22:00 UTC−03:00		Report		Attendance: 2,229; Referee: Antônio Dib Moraes de Sousa (Piauí)
Note: 0–0 on aggregate. Fortaleza won 3–2 on penalties.

18 April	Caxias	0–0	Resende	Estádio Centenário, Caxias do Sul
20:30 UTC−03:00		Report		Attendance: 733; Referee: Rodrigo Alonso Ferreira (Santa Catarina)
Note: Resende won 2–1 on aggregate.

18 April	Náutico	1–1	CRAC	Estádio dos Aflitos, Recife
20:30 UTC−03:00	Élton 86'	Report	Jonatan 29'	Attendance: 3,026; Referee: Ítalo Medeiros de Azevedo (Rio Grande do Norte)
Note: CRAC won 4–2 on aggregate.

24 April	Avaí	4–1	Volta Redonda	Estádio da Ressacada, Florianópolis
19:30 UTC−03:00	Higor 12'; Reis 28'; Marquinhos 54'; Danilo 73'	Report	Rafael Granja 15'	Attendance: 4,545; Referee: Adriano Milczvski (Paraná)
Note: Avaí won 4–2 on aggregate.

24 April	Paraná	2–3	São Bernardo	Eco-Estádio, Curitiba
19:30 UTC−03:00	Carlinhos 24'; Rubinho 64'	Report	Kleber 30'; Fernando Baiano 33'; Bady 71'	Attendance: 3,889; Referee: Anderson Daronco (Rio Grande do Sul)
Note: São Bernardo won 4–3 on aggregate.

24 April	Botafogo	2–0	Sobradinho	Estádio Raulino de Oliveira, Volta Redonda
19:30 UTC−03:00	Rafael Marques 35'; Fellype Gabriel 73'	Report		Attendance: 2,895; Referee: Rodrigo Guarizo do Amaral (São Paulo)
Note: Botafogo won 2–0 on aggregate.

25 April	ASA	2–1	Santa Cruz-RN	Estádio Coaracy da Mata Fonseca, Arapiraca
20:30 UTC−03:00	Tiago Garça 30', 56'	Report	Maurício Pantera 37'	Attendance: 1,489; Referee: Marielson Alves Silva (Bahia)
Note: ASA won 2–1 on aggregate.

25 April	CRB	2–1	Fast Clube	Estádio Rei Pelé, Maceió
20:30 UTC−03:00	Schwenck 20'; Marcos Antonio 90'	Report	Junior 58'	Attendance: 5,160; Referee: Clizaldo Di Pace França (Paraíba)
Note: CRB won 3–2 on aggregate.

25 April	América de Natal	1–0	Ji-Paraná	Nazarenão, Goianinha
20:30 UTC−03:00	Tiago Adan 86'	Report		Attendance: 1,306; Referee: Nielson Nogueira Dias (Pernambuco)
Note: América de Natal won 2–0 on aggregate.

== Second round ==
Team 1	Agg.	Team 2	1st leg	2nd leg
Flamengo (Rio de Janeiro (state))	4–2	(Paraíba) Campinense	2–1	2–1
Ceará	3–3 (3–4 p)	(Alagoas) ASA	0–3	3–0
Internacional (Rio Grande do Sul)	2–0	(Pernambuco) Santa Cruz	0–0	2–0
Avaí (Santa Catarina (state))	1–3	(Minas Gerais) América Mineiro	1–0	0–3
Goiás	4–2	(São Paulo (state)) Santo André	3–2	1–0
Sport Recife (Pernambuco)	2–5	(Rio Grande do Norte) ABC	0–2	2–3
Vitória (Bahia)	1–1 (a)	(Pernambuco) Salgueiro	0–0	1–1
Criciúma (Santa Catarina (state))	4–2	(São Paulo (state)) São Bernardo	1–1	3–1
Coritiba (Paraná (state))	2–4	(Amazonas (Brazilian state)) Nacional-AM	1–4	1–0
Ponte Preta (São Paulo (state))	3–1	(São Paulo (state)) Bragantino	3–1	NP
Botafogo (Rio de Janeiro (state))	3–0	(Alagoas) CRB	0–0	3–0
Figueirense (Santa Catarina (state))	3–1	(Paraná (state)) Arapongas	0–0	3–1
Cruzeiro (Minas Gerais)	6–1	(Rio de Janeiro (state)) Resende	2–1	4–0
Atlético Goianiense (Goiás)	3–1	(Paraná (state)) Cianorte	3–1	NP
Atlético Paranaense (Paraná (state))	6–2	(Rio Grande do Norte) América de Natal	6–2	NP
Paysandu (Pará)	1–2	(Mato Grosso do Sul) Naviraiense^{1}	1–0	0–2
Santos (São Paulo (state))	1–0	(Santa Catarina (state)) Joinville	1–0	0–0
Betim (Minas Gerais)	2–4	(Goiás) CRAC	2–3	0–1
Bahia	1–2	(Mato Grosso) Luverdense	0–2	1–0
Fortaleza (Ceará)	5–1	(Sergipe) Confiança	1–1	4–0

- Note 1: Naviraiense won on aggregate but was disqualified by the STJD after being punished for fielding an ineligible player.

=== First leg ===
1 May	Santo André	2–3	Goiás	Estádio Bruno José Daniel, Santo André
15:00 UTC−03:00	Elvis 35' (pen.); Gustavinho 90+2'	Report	Walter 38'; Eduardo Sasha 70', 74'	Attendance: 1,990; Referee: Wagner do Nascimento Magalhães (Rio de Janeiro)

1 May	Cianorte	1–3	Atlético Goianiense	Estádio Albino Turbay, Cianorte
16:00 UTC−03:00	Heli 85'	Report	Ricardo Jesus 19'; Caio César 34'; Dodô 60'	Attendance: 819; Referee: Marcos Mateus Pereira (Mato Grosso do Sul)
Note: Atlético Goianiense advanced because they won by at least two goals as the visiting team in the first leg.

1 May	CRAC	3–2	Betim	Estádio Genervino da Fonseca, Catalão
16:00 UTC−03:00	William Júnior 21'; Jonatan 38'; Pantico 63' (pen.)	Report	Marion 14'; Azevedo 69'	Attendance: 3,470; Referee: Janio Pires Gonçalves (Tocantins)

1 May	Campinense	1–2	Flamengo	Amigão, Campina Grande
21:50 UTC−03:00	Jeferson Maranhense 8'	Report	Renato Abreu 28', 60'	Attendance: 16,580; Referee: Dewson Fernando Freitas da Silva (Pará)

1 May	ASA	3–0	Ceará	Estádio Coaracy da Mata Fonseca, Arapiraca
21:50 UTC−03:00	Léo Gamalho 23', 64'; Didira 77'	Report		Attendance: 1,209; Referee: Gilberto Rodrigues Castro Junior (Pernambuco)

1 May	Santa Cruz	0–0	Internacional	Estádio do Arruda, Recife
21:50 UTC−03:00		Report		Attendance: 15,072; Referee: Arilson Bispo da Anunciação (Bahia)

1 May	Resende	1–2	Cruzeiro	Estádio Raulino de Oliveira, Volta Redonda
21:50 UTC−03:00	Guto 76'	Report	Everton Ribeiro 58'; Nílton 59'	Attendance: 968; Referee: Marcos André Gomes da Penha (Espírito Santo)

2 May	CRB	0–0	Botafogo	Estádio Rei Pelé, Maceió
19:30 UTC−03:00		Report		Attendance: 14,194; Referee: Cláudio Francisco Lima e Silva (Sergipe)

7 May	São Bernardo	1–1	Criciúma	Primeiro de Maio, São Bernardo do Campo
19:30 UTC−03:00	Marlon 53' (o.g.)	Report	Marcel 65'	Attendance: 5,094; Referee: Grazianni Maciel Rocha (Rio de Janeiro)

7 May	América Mineiro	0–1	Avaí	Estádio Independência, Belo Horizonte
21:50 UTC−03:00		Report	Reis 62'	Attendance: 2,393; Referee: Devarly Lira do Rosário (Espírito Santo)

8 May	Arapongas	0–0	Figueirense	Estádio dos Pássaros, Arapongas
19:30 UTC−03:00		Report		Attendance: 3,181; Referee: Rodrigo Guarizo do Amaral (São Paulo)

8 May	Confiança	1–1	Fortaleza	Batistão, Aracaju
20:30 UTC−03:00	Wallace 44'	Report	Jaílson 36'	Attendance: 3,266; Referee: Renan Roberto de Souza (Paraíba)

8 May	ABC	2–0	Sport Recife	Frasqueirão, Natal
22:00 UTC−03:00	Jean Carioca 57'; Rodrigo Silva 77'	Report		Attendance: 3,411; Referee: Charles Hebert Cavalcante Ferreira (Alagoas)

8 May	Naviraiense	0–1	Paysandu	Virotão, Naviraí
22:00 UTC−03:00		Report	Rafael Oliveira 8'	Attendance: 1,320; Referee: Alinor Silva da Paixão (Mato Grosso)

8 May	Joinville	0–1	Santos	Arena Joinville, Joinville
22:00 UTC−03:00		Report	Durval 83'	Attendance: 15,991; Referee: Márcio Chagas da Silva (Rio Grande do Sul)

8 May	Luverdense	2–0	Bahia	Passo das Emas Stadium, Lucas do Rio Verde
22:00 UTC−03:00	Tozim 16'; Marcelo Maciel 50'	Report		Attendance: 2,156; Referee: Elmo Alves Resende Cunha (Goiás)

9 May	América de Natal	2–6	Atlético Paranaense	Estádio Manoel Dantas Barretto, Ceará-Mirim
19:30 UTC−03:00	Itamar 41'; Daniel 43'	Report	Ederson 2', 45+2'; Felipe 14' (pen.); Cleberson 37'; Manoel 72'; Douglas Coutinho 89'	Attendance: 3,626; Referee: Avelar Rodrigo da Silva (Ceará)
Note: Atlético Paranaense advanced because they won by at least two goals as the visiting team in the first leg.

9 May	Bragantino	1–3	Ponte Preta	Estádio Nabi Abi Chedid, Bragança Paulista
21:50 UTC−03:00	Serginho 19'	Report	Rildo 46'; William 54', 68'	Attendance: 565; Referee: Rodrigo Braghetto (São Paulo)
Note: Ponte Preta advanced because they won by at least two goals as the visiting team in the first leg.

15 May	Salgueiro	0–0	Vitória	Estádio Cornélio de Barros, Salgueiro
19:30 UTC−03:00		Report		Attendance: 2,608; Referee: Cláudio Francisco Lima e Silva (Sergipe)

15 May	Nacional-AM	4–1	Coritiba	Estádio Roberto Simonsen, Manaus
21:30 UTC−03:00	Danilo Rios 9', 45+1' (pen.); Wesley Gigu 30'; Ricardo Amaral 83'	Report	Geraldo 25'	Attendance: 3,051; Referee: Antônio Neuriclaudio do Rego Costa (Acre)

=== Second leg ===
8 May	Ceará	3–0 (3–4 p)	ASA	Estádio Presidente Vargas, Fortaleza
22:00 UTC−03:00	Rafael Vaz 10'; Pingo 32'; Mota 66'	Report		Attendance: 18,845; Referee: Antonio Dib Moraes de Sousa (Piauí)
Note: 3–3 on aggregate. ASA won 4–3 on penalties.

15 May	Goiás	1–0	Santo André	Estádio Serra Dourada, Goiânia
19:30 UTC−03:00	Junior Viçosa 68'	Report		Attendance: 5,551; Referee: Wagner Reway (Mato Grosso)
Note: Goiás won 4–2 on aggregate.

15 May	Criciúma	3–1	São Bernardo	Estádio Heriberto Hülse, Criciúma
19:30 UTC−03:00	Giancarlo 19'; Elton 63'; Lins 80'	Report	Gil 41'	Attendance: 9,103; Referee: Edivaldo Elias da Silva (Paraná)
Note: Criciúma won 4–2 on aggregate.

15 May	Paysandu	0–2	Naviraiense	Estádio da Curuzú, Belém
20:30 UTC−03:00		Report	Everson Piki 82'; Joel 90'	Attendance: 11,316; Referee: Mayron dos Reis Novais (Maranhão)
Note: Naviraiense won 2–1 on aggregate, but was disqualified. Paysandu advanced.

15 May	Betim	0–1	CRAC	Arena do Calçado, Nova Serrana
20:30 UTC−03:00		Report	Jonatan 42'	Attendance: 336; Referee: Rodrigo Carvalhaes de Miranda (Rio de Janeiro)
Note: CRAC won 4–2 on aggregate.

15 May	Flamengo	2–1	Campinense	Estádio Mário Helênio, Juiz de Fora
22:00 UTC−03:00	Roberto 6' (o.g.); Elias 78'	Report	Bismarck 8'	Attendance: 19,286; Referee: Cleisson Veloso Pereira (Minas Gerais)
Note: Flamengo won 4–2 on aggregate.

15 May	Internacional	2–0	Santa Cruz	Estádio Centenário, Caxias do Sul
22:00 UTC−03:00	D'Alessandro 58'; Caio 82'	Report		Attendance: 2,957; Referee: Antônio Denival de Morais (Paraná)
Note: Internacional won 2–0 on aggregate.

15 May	Bahia	1–0	Luverdense	Arena Fonte Nova, Salvador
22:00 UTC−03:00	Rafael Donato 65'	Report		Attendance: 1,706; Referee: Pablo dos Santos Alves (Espírito Santo)
Note: Luverdense won 2–1 on aggregate.

16 May	Avaí	0–3	América Mineiro	Estádio da Ressacada, Florianópolis
19:30 UTC−03:00		Report	Fábio Júnior 33', 81' (pen.); Leandro Ferreira 58'	Attendance: 4,241; Referee: Wagner dos Santos Rosa (Rio de Janeiro)
Note: América Mineiro won 3–1 on aggregate.

21 May	Sport Recife	2–3	ABC	Estádio Ilha do Retiro, Recife
21:00 UTC−03:00	Maurício 3'; Renan Teixeira 42'	Report	Rodrigo Silva 10', 69'; Rodrigo Santos 84'	Attendance: 6,262; Referee: Jaílson Macedo Freitas (Bahia)
Note: ABC won 5–2 on aggregate.

22 May	Vitória	1–1	Salgueiro	Arena Fonte Nova, Salvador
19:30 UTC−03:00	Neto Coruja 21'	Report	Elvis 29'	Attendance: 6,102; Referee: André Luiz de Freitas Castro (Goiás)
Note: 1–1 on aggregate. Salgueiro won on away goals.

22 May	Figueirense	3–1	Arapongas	Estádio Orlando Scarpelli, Florianópolis
20:30 UTC−03:00	Maylson 45'; Ricardinho 68'; Rafael Costa 79'	Report	Cristovam 57'	Attendance: 4,292; Referee: Diego Almeida Real (Rio Grande do Sul)
Note: Figueirense won 3–1 on aggregate.

22 May	Botafogo	3–0	CRB	Estádio Raulino de Oliveira, Volta Redonda
22:00 UTC−03:00	Antônio Carlos 22'; Andrezinho 85'; Rafael Marques 87'	Report		Attendance: 1,173; Referee: Vinícius Furlan (São Paulo)
Note: Botafogo won 3–0 on aggregate.

22 May	Cruzeiro	4–0	Resende	Mineirão, Belo Horizonte
22:00 UTC−03:00	Dagoberto 6'; Borges 37', 49'; Lucca 89'	Report		Attendance: 12,245; Referee: Rodrigo Batista Raposo (Distrito Federal)
Note: Cruzeiro won 6–1 on aggregate.

22 May	Santos	0–0	Joinville	Estádio Vila Belmiro, Santos
22:00 UTC−03:00		Report		Attendance: 4,758; Referee: Dewson Fernando Freitas da Silva (Pará)
Note: Santos won 1–0 on aggregate.

23 May	Coritiba	1–0	Nacional-AM	Estádio Couto Pereira, Curitiba
19:30 UTC−03:00	Geraldo 30'	Report		Attendance: 12,917; Referee: Bráulio da Silva Machado (Santa Catarina)
Note: Nacional won 4–2 on aggregate.

23 May	Fortaleza	4–0	Confiança	Estádio Presidente Vargas, Fortaleza
19:30 UTC−03:00	Assisinho 2', 74'; Marinho Donizete 25'; Fabrício 86'	Report		Attendance: 12,144; Referee: Leandro Saraiva Dantas de Oliveira (Rio Grande do Norte)
Note: Fortaleza won 5–1 on aggregate.

== Third round ==
Team 1	Agg.	Team 2	1st leg	2nd leg
Flamengo (Rio de Janeiro (state))	4–1	(Alagoas) ASA	2–0	2–1
América Mineiro (Minas Gerais)	2–4	(Rio Grande do Sul) Internacional	1–3	1–1
ABC (Rio Grande do Norte)	1–4	Goiás	0–3	1–1
Criciúma (Santa Catarina (state))	1–1 (a)	(Pernambuco) Salgueiro	0–0	1–1
Nacional-AM (Amazonas (Brazilian state))	2–0	(São Paulo (state)) Ponte Preta	1–0	1–0
Figueirense (Santa Catarina (state))	1–1 (4–5 p)	(Rio de Janeiro (state)) Botafogo	0–1	1–0
Atlético Goianiense (Goiás)	0–6	(Minas Gerais) Cruzeiro	0–5	0–1
Atlético Paranaense (Paraná (state))	2–1	(Pará) Paysandu	0–0	2–1
CRAC (Goiás)	1–3	(São Paulo (state)) Santos	1–1	0–2
Luverdense (Mato Grosso)	2–1	(Ceará) Fortaleza	0–0	2–1

=== First leg ===
2 July	Salgueiro	0–0	Criciúma	Estádio Cornélio de Barros, Salgueiro
19:30 UTC−03:00		Report		Attendance: 1,894; Referee: Francisco Carlos do Nascimento (Alagoas)

3 July	Goiás	3–0	ABC	Estádio Serra Dourada, Goiânia
21:50 UTC−03:00	Amaral 38'; Renan Oliveira 47'; Walter 85' (pen.)	Report		Attendance: 2,000; Referee: Emerson de Almeida Ferreira (Minas Gerais)

3 July	Botafogo	1–0	Figueirense	Estádio Raulino de Oliveira, Volta Redonda
21:50 UTC−03:00	Rafael Marques 29'	Report		Attendance: 1,262; Referee: Guilherme Ceretta de Lima (São Paulo)

9 July	Cruzeiro	5–0	Atlético Goianiense	Mineirão, Belo Horizonte
21:50 UTC−03:00	Diego Souza 10'; Vinícius Araújo 31'; Dedé 44'; Everton Ribeiro 58'; Egídio 76'	Report		Attendance: 11,317; Referee: Rodrigo Nunes de Sá (Rio de Janeiro)

10 July	Fortaleza	0–0	Luverdense	Estádio Presidente Vargas, Fortaleza
19:00 UTC−03:00		Report		Attendance: 12,834; Referee: Ítalo Medeiros de Azevedo (Rio Grande do Norte)

10 July	Ponte Preta	0–1	Nacional-AM	Estádio Moisés Lucarelli, Campinas
19:30 UTC−03:00		Report	Danilo Rios 75'	Attendance: 2,453; Referee: Luis Teixeira Rocha (Rio Grande do Sul)

10 July	ASA	0–2	Flamengo	Estádio Coaracy da Mata Fonseca, Arapiraca
21:50 UTC−03:00		Report	Moreno 63'; Nixon 73'	Attendance: 5,252; Referee: Leandro Bizzio Marinho (São Paulo)

10 July	Internacional	3–1	América Mineiro	Estádio Centenário, Caxias do Sul
21:50 UTC−03:00	D'Alessandro 66' (pen.); Forlán 69'; Maurides 89'	Report	Rodriguinho 40'	Attendance: 3,407; Referee: Bráulio da Silva Machado (Santa Catarina)

10 July	Santos	1–1	CRAC	Estádio Vila Belmiro, Santos
21:50 UTC−03:00	Leandrinho 39'	Report	Ben-Hur 67'	Attendance: 3,800; Referee: Leandro Júnior Hermes (Paraná)

17 July	Paysandu	0–0	Atlético Paranaense	Estádio Olímpico do Pará, Belém
19:30 UTC−03:00		Report		Attendance: 12,082; Referee: André Luiz de Freitas Castro (Goiás)

=== Second leg ===
17 July	Criciúma	1–1	Salgueiro	Estádio Heriberto Hülse, Criciúma
19:30 UTC−03:00	Fábio Ferreira 35'	Report	Fabrício Ceará 87'	Attendance: 9,969; Referee: Fabrício Neves Correa (Rio Grande do Sul)
Note: 1–1 on aggregate. Salgueiro won on away goals.

17 July	Atlético Goianiense	0–1	Cruzeiro	Estádio Serra Dourada, Goiânia
19:30 UTC−03:00		Report	Lucca 11'	Attendance: 1,280; Referee: Raphael Claus (São Paulo)
Note: Cruzeiro won 6–0 on aggregate.

17 July	Flamengo	2–1	ASA	Estádio Raulino de Oliveira, Volta Redonda
21:50 UTC−03:00	Elias 43'; Moreno 81'	Report	Osmar 57'	Attendance: 3,116; Referee: Anderson Daronco (Rio Grande do Sul)
Note: Flamengo won 4–1 on aggregate.

17 July	América Mineiro	1–1	Internacional	Estádio Independência, Belo Horizonte
21:50 UTC−03:00	Ronaldo Alves 59' (o.g.)	Report	D'Alessandro 68'	Attendance: 1,268; Referee: Edivaldo Elias da Silva (Paraná)
Note: Internacional won 4–2 on aggregate.

17 July	ABC	1–1	Goiás	Frasqueirão, Natal
21:50 UTC−03:00	Diogo Barcelos 32'	Report	Hugo 72'	Attendance: 2,268; Referee: Jaílson Macedo Freitas (Bahia)
Note: Goiás won 4–1 on aggregate.

18 July	Luverdense	2–1	Fortaleza	Passo das Emas Stadium, Lucas do Rio Verde
21:50 UTC−03:00	Tozin 9'; Gilson 43'	Report	Guarú 40'	Attendance: 2,357; Referee: Guilherme Ceretta de Lima (São Paulo)
Note: Luverdense won 2–1 on aggregate.

24 July	Atlético Paranaense	2–1	Paysandu	Estádio Vila Capanema, Curitiba
19:30 UTC−03:00	Paulo Baier 8' (pen.); Marcelo 60'	Report	Zé Antônio 72'	Attendance: 4,946; Referee: Grazianni Maciel Rocha (Rio de Janeiro)
Note: Atlético Paranaense won 2–1 on aggregate.

24 July	Nacional-AM	1–0	Ponte Preta	Estádio Roberto Simonsen, Manaus
21:30 UTC−03:00	Leonardo 19'	Report		Attendance: 5,000; Referee: Dewson Fernando Freitas da Silva (Pará)
Note: Nacional won 2–0 on aggregate.

24 July	Figueirense	1–0 (4–5 p)	Botafogo	Estádio Orlando Scarpelli, Florianópolis
21:50 UTC−03:00	Ricardo Bueno 10'	Report		Attendance: 2,932; Referee: Márcio Chagas da Silva (Rio Grande do Sul)
	Penalties
	Ricardo Bueno (penalty missed); Tchô (penalty scored); Wellington Saci (penalty scored); André Rocha (penalty missed); Thiego (penalty scored); Bruno Pires (penalty scored); Nem (penalty missed)		(penalty missed) Lodeiro; (penalty scored) Seedorf; (penalty scored) Renato; (penalty missed) Edílson; (penalty scored) Dória; (penalty scored) Alex; (penalty scored) Rafael Marques
Note: 1–1 on aggregate. Botafogo won 5–4 on penalties.

24 July	CRAC	0–2	Santos	Estádio Genervino da Fonseca, Catalão
21:50 UTC−03:00		Report	Gustavo Henrique 9'; Léo Cittadini 75'	Attendance: 1,568; Referee: Wagner Reway (Mato Grosso)
Note: Santos won 3–1 on aggregate.

== Final rounds ==
A draw by CBF scheduled for August 6 set the matches for this round. The 16 qualified teams were divided in two pots. Teams from pot 1 are the ones who competed at the 2013 Copa Libertadores (except São Paulo, replaced by Vasco da Gama) plus the two highest CBF ranked teams qualified via the Third Round. Pot 2 is composed of the other teams that qualified through the Third Round.

=== Qualified teams ===
Pot 1	Pot 2
(Minas Gerais) Atlético Mineiro; (São Paulo (state)) Corinthians; (Rio de Janeiro (state)) Fluminense; (Rio Grande do Sul) Grêmio; (São Paulo (state)) Palmeiras; (Rio de Janeiro (state)) Vasco da Gama; (Rio Grande do Sul) Internacional; (Rio de Janeiro (state)) Flamengo	(São Paulo (state)) Santos; (Minas Gerais) Cruzeiro; (Paraná (state)) Atlético Paranaense; (Rio de Janeiro (state)) Botafogo; Goiás; (Mato Grosso) Luverdense; (Pernambuco) Salgueiro; (Amazonas (Brazilian state)) Nacional-AM

=== Bracket ===
Teams that play in their home stadium in the first leg are marked with †.

Round of 16
(São Paulo (state)) Corinthians	0	2	2
(Mato Grosso) Luverdense †	1	0	1
(Rio Grande do Sul) Grêmio	0	2	2
(São Paulo (state)) Santos †	1	0	1
(Rio Grande do Sul) Internacional †	3	2	5
(Pernambuco) Salgueiro	0	2	2
(São Paulo (state)) Palmeiras †	1	0	1
(Paraná (state)) Atlético Paranaense	0	3	3
(Rio de Janeiro (state)) Fluminense †	1	0	1
Goiás	0	2	2
(Rio de Janeiro (state)) Vasco da Gama	2	2	4
(Amazonas (Brazilian state)) Nacional-AM †	0	1	1
(Minas Gerais) Atlético Mineiro	2	2	4
(Rio de Janeiro (state)) Botafogo †	4	2	6
(Rio de Janeiro (state)) Flamengo (a)	1	1	2
(Minas Gerais) Cruzeiro †	2	0	2

Quarterfinals
(São Paulo (state)) Corinthians †	0	0	0 (2)
(Rio Grande do Sul) Grêmio (p)	0	0	0 (3)
(Rio Grande do Sul) Internacional †	1	0	1
(Paraná (state)) Atlético Paranaense (a)	1	0	1
Goiás † (a)	2	2	4
(Rio de Janeiro (state)) Vasco da Gama	1	3	4
(Rio de Janeiro (state)) Botafogo ‡	1	0	1
(Rio de Janeiro (state)) Flamengo	1	4	5

Semifinals
(Rio Grande do Sul) Grêmio	0	0	0
(Paraná (state)) Atlético Paranaense †	1	0	1
Goiás †	1	1	2
(Rio de Janeiro (state)) Flamengo	2	2	4

Finals
(Paraná (state)) Atlético Paranaense †	1	0	1
(Rio de Janeiro (state)) Flamengo	1	2	3

=== Round of 16 ===
Team 1	Agg.	Team 2	1st leg	2nd leg
Corinthians (São Paulo (state))	2–1	(Mato Grosso) Luverdense	0–1	2–0
Grêmio (Rio Grande do Sul)	2–1	(São Paulo (state)) Santos	0–1	2–0
Salgueiro (Pernambuco)	2–5	(Rio Grande do Sul) Internacional	0–3	2–2
Atlético Paranaense (Paraná (state))	3–1	(São Paulo (state)) Palmeiras	0–1	3–0
Goiás	2–1	(Rio de Janeiro (state)) Fluminense	0–1	2–0
Vasco da Gama (Rio de Janeiro (state))	4–1	(Amazonas (Brazilian state)) Nacional-AM	2–0	2–1
Atlético Mineiro (Minas Gerais)	4–6	(Rio de Janeiro (state)) Botafogo	2–4	2–2
Flamengo (Rio de Janeiro (state))	2–2 (a)	(Minas Gerais) Cruzeiro	1–2	1–0

==== First leg ====
20 August	Nacional-AM	0–2	Vasco da Gama	Estádio Roberto Simonsen, Manaus
21:50 UTC−03:00		Report	Tenorio 44', 90+1' (pen.)	Attendance: 5,000; Referee: Dewson Fernando Freitas da Silva (Pará)

21 August	Santos	1–0	Grêmio	Estádio Vila Belmiro, Santos
19:30 UTC−03:00	Gabriel 82'	Report		Attendance: 6,195; Referee: Jaílson Macedo Freitas (Bahia)

21 August	Palmeiras	1–0	Atlético Paranaense	Estádio do Pacaembu, São Paulo
19:30 UTC−03:00	Vilson 4'	Report		Attendance: 20,856; Referee: André Luiz de Freitas Castro (Goiás)

21 August	Luverdense	1–0	Corinthians	Passo das Emas Stadium, Lucas do Rio Verde
21:50 UTC−03:00	Misael 90'	Report		Attendance: 9,102; Referee: Pablo dos Santos Alves (Espírito Santo)

21 August	Fluminense	1–0	Goiás	Estádio do Maracanã, Rio de Janeiro
21:50 UTC−03:00	Samuel 43'	Report		Attendance: 20,083; Referee: Marcos André Gomes da Penha (Espírito Santo)

21 August	Cruzeiro	2–1	Flamengo	Mineirão, Belo Horizonte
21:50 UTC−03:00	Willian 28'; Everton Ribeiro 57'	Report	Carlos Eduardo 69'	Attendance: 33,645; Referee: Marcelo Aparecido de Souza (São Paulo)

22 August	Internacional	3–0	Salgueiro	Estádio do Vale, Novo Hamburgo
19:30 UTC−03:00	D'Alessandro 49' (pen.); Scocco 67'; Forlán 88'	Report		Attendance: 1,686; Referee: Alício Pena Júnior (Minas Gerais)

22 August	Botafogo	4–2	Atlético Mineiro	Estádio do Maracanã, Rio de Janeiro
21:50 UTC−03:00	Lodeiro 30'; Leonardo Silva 49' (o.g.); Rafael Marques 56'; Vitinho 85'	Report	Marcos Rocha 21'; Guilherme 89'	Attendance: 20,286; Referee: Paulo Godoy Bezerra (Santa Catarina)

==== Second leg ====
28 August	Goiás	2–0	Fluminense	Estádio Serra Dourada, Goiânia
19:30 UTC−03:00	Renan Oliveira 45+2'; William Matheus 55'	Report		Attendance: 22,892; Referee: Luiz Flávio de Oliveira (São Paulo)
Note: Goiás won 2–1 on aggregate.

28 August	Atlético Mineiro	2–2	Botafogo	Estádio Independência, Belo Horizonte
19:30 UTC−03:00	Marcos Rocha 38'; Fernandinho 57'	Report	Rafael Marques 51'; Dória 62'	Attendance: 16,048; Referee: Wilton Pereira Sampaio (Goiás)
Note: Botafogo won 6–4 on aggregate.

28 August	Corinthians	2–0	Luverdense	Estádio do Pacaembu, São Paulo
21:50 UTC−03:00	Pato 30'; Fábio Santos 45'	Report		Attendance: 28,576; Referee: Wagner do Nascimento Magalhães (Rio de Janeiro)
Note: Corinthians won 2–1 on aggregate.

28 August	Grêmio	2–0	Santos	Arena do Grêmio, Porto Alegre
21:50 UTC−03:00	Souza 55'; Werley 88'	Report		Attendance: 25,871; Referee: Felipe Gomes da Silva (Paraná)
Note: Grêmio won 2–1 on aggregate.

28 August	Atlético Paranaense	3–0	Palmeiras	Estádio Vila Capanema, Curitiba
21:50 UTC−03:00	Éderson 35', 78'; Paulo Baier 67'	Report		Attendance: 10,789; Referee: Ricardo Marques Ribeiro (Minas Gerais)
Note: Atlético Paranaense won 3–1 on aggregate.

28 August	Flamengo	1–0	Cruzeiro	Estádio do Maracanã, Rio de Janeiro
21:50 UTC−03:00	Elias 88'	Report		Attendance: 53,538; Referee: Jaílson Macedo Freitas (Bahia)
Note: 2–2 on aggregate. Flamengo won on away goals.

29 August	Salgueiro	2–2	Internacional	Estádio Cornélio de Barros, Salgueiro
21:50 UTC−03:00	Ranieri 57'; Daniel 90+1'	Report	Jorge Henrique 14'; Alex 62'	Attendance: 1,287; Referee: Wagner Reway (Mato Grosso)
Note: Internacional won 5–2 on aggregate.

29 August	Vasco da Gama	2–1	Nacional-AM	Estádio São Januário, Rio de Janeiro
21:50 UTC−03:00	Marlone 33'; Dakson 89'	Report	Danilo Rios 7'	Attendance: 8,100; Referee: Jean Pierre Gonçalves Lima (Rio Grande do Sul)
Note: Vasco da Gama won 4–1 on aggregate.

=== Quarterfinals ===
Team 1	Agg.	Team 2	1st leg	2nd leg
Corinthians (São Paulo (state))	0–0 (2–3 p)	(Rio Grande do Sul) Grêmio	0–0	0–0
Internacional (Rio Grande do Sul)	1–1 (a)	(Paraná (state)) Atlético Paranaense	1–1	0–0
Goiás	4–4 (a)	(Rio de Janeiro (state)) Vasco da Gama	2–1	2–3
Botafogo (Rio de Janeiro (state))	1–5	(Rio de Janeiro (state)) Flamengo	1–1	0–4

==== First leg ====
25 September	Corinthians	0–0	Grêmio	Estádio do Pacaembu, São Paulo
21:50 UTC−03:00		Report		Attendance: 28,351; Referee: Ricardo Marques Ribeiro (Minas Gerais)

25 September	Goiás	2–1	Vasco da Gama	Estádio Serra Dourada, Goiânia
21:50 UTC−03:00	Walter 9' (pen.); Roni 74'	Report	Edmilson 2'	Attendance: 13,753; Referee: Paulo César de Oliveira (São Paulo)

25 September	Botafogo	1–1	Flamengo	Estádio do Maracanã, Rio de Janeiro
21:50 UTC−03:00	Edílson 58'	Report	André Santos 13'	Attendance: 34,319; Referee: Wagner do Nascimento Magalhães (Rio de Janeiro)

26 September	Internacional	1–1	Atlético Paranaense	Estádio do Vale, Novo Hamburgo
21:00 UTC−03:00	Otávio 89'	Report	Paulo Baier 5'	Attendance: 5,923; Referee: Sandro Ricci (Pernambuco)

==== Second leg ====
23 October	Grêmio	0–0 (3–2 p)	Corinthians	Arena do Grêmio, Porto Alegre
21:50 UTC−02:00		Report		Attendance: 33,503; Referee: Paulo Godoy Bezerra (Santa Catarina)
	Penalties
	Barcos (penalty missed); Alex Telles (penalty missed); Pará (penalty scored); Elano (penalty scored); Kléber (penalty scored)		(penalty missed) Danilo; (penalty scored) Romarinho; (penalty missed) Edenílson; (penalty scored) Alessandro; (penalty missed) Pato
Note: 0–0 on aggregate. Grêmio won 3–2 on penalties.

23 October	Atlético Paranaense	0–0	Internacional	Estádio Vila Capanema, Curitiba
21:50 UTC−02:00		Report		Attendance: 12,629; Referee: Wilson Seneme (São Paulo)
Note: 1–1 on aggregate. Atlético Paranaense won on away goals.

23 October	Flamengo	4–0	Botafogo	Estádio do Maracanã, Rio de Janeiro
21:50 UTC−02:00	Hernane 20', 33', 58'; Léo Moura 72' (pen.)	Report		Attendance: 59,848; Referee: Paulo César de Oliveira (São Paulo)
Note: Flamengo won 5–1 on aggregate.

24 October	Vasco da Gama	3–2	Goiás	Estádio do Maracanã, Rio de Janeiro
21:00 UTC−02:00	Thalles 3', 17'; Willie 80'	Report	Hugo 19'; Amaral 56'	Attendance: 36,061; Referee: Luiz Flávio de Oliveira (São Paulo)
Note: 4–4 on aggregate. Goiás won on away goals.

=== Semifinals ===
Team 1	Agg.	Team 2	1st leg	2nd leg
Atlético Paranaense (Paraná (state))	1–0	(Rio Grande do Sul) Grêmio	1–0	0–0
Goiás	2–4	(Rio de Janeiro (state)) Flamengo	1–2	1–2

==== First leg ====
30 October	Atlético Paranaense	1–0	Grêmio	Estádio Vila Capanema, Curitiba
21:50 UTC−02:00	Dellatorre 37'	Report		Attendance: 15,162; Referee: Ricardo Marques Ribeiro (Minas Gerais)

30 October	Goiás	1–2	Flamengo	Estádio Serra Dourada, Goiânia
21:50 UTC−02:00	Vítor 39'	Report	Paulinho 26'; Chicão 42'	Attendance: 35,112; Referee: Wilson Seneme (São Paulo)

==== Second leg ====
6 November	Grêmio	0–0	Atlético Paranaense	Arena do Grêmio, Porto Alegre
21:50 UTC−02:00		Report		Attendance: 41,244; Referee: Marcelo de Lima Henrique (Rio de Janeiro)
Note: Atlético Paranaense won 1–0 on aggregate.

6 November	Flamengo	2–1	Goiás	Estádio do Maracanã, Rio de Janeiro
21:50 UTC−02:00	Hernane 14'; Elias 24'	Report	Eduardo Sasha 5'	Attendance: 56,224; Referee: Leandro Vuaden (Rio Grande do Sul)
Note: Flamengo won 4–2 on aggregate.

=== Finals ===
Team 1	Agg.	Team 2	1st leg	2nd leg
Atlético Paranaense (Paraná (state))	1–3	(Rio de Janeiro (state)) Flamengo	1–1	0–2

==== First leg ====
20 November	Atlético Paranaense	1–1	Flamengo	Estádio Vila Capanema, Curitiba
21:50 UTC−02:00	Marcelo 18'	Report	Amaral 31'	Attendance: 15,484; Referee: Paulo César de Oliveira (São Paulo)

Atlético-PR	Flamengo

==== Second leg ====
27 November	Flamengo	2–0	Atlético Paranaense	Estádio do Maracanã, Rio de Janeiro
21:50 UTC−02:00	Elias 88'; Hernane 90+5'	Report		Attendance: 68,857; Referee: Leandro Vuaden (Rio Grande do Sul)
Note: Flamengo won 3–1 on aggregate.

Flamengo	Atlético-PR

2013 Copa do Brasil
Champions

Flamengo
3rd title

== Copa Sudamericana qualification ==
The eight best teams eliminated before the Round of 16 with the best 2012 Série A or 2012 Série B record qualified for 2013 Copa Sudamericana.

Pos	Team	Final status
1	Botafogo	Round of 16
2	Santos	Round of 16
3	Cruzeiro	Round of 16
4	Internacional	Round of 16
5	Flamengo	Round of 16
6	Náutico	Eliminated (first round)
7	Coritiba	Eliminated (second round)
8	Ponte Preta	Eliminated (third round)
9	Bahia	Eliminated (second round)
10	Portuguesa	Eliminated (first round)
11	Goiás	Round of 16
12	Criciúma	Eliminated (third round)
13	Atlético Paranaense	Round of 16
14	Vitória	Eliminated (second round)
15	Sport Recife	Eliminated (second round)
16	Palmeiras	Not eligible
17	Atlético Goianiense	Eliminated (third round)
18	Figueirense	Eliminated (third round)

Key to colors on the table
Qualified
Not qualified
