= Danilo Pereira (disambiguation) =

Danilo Pereira (born 1991) is a Portuguese professional footballer.

Danilo Pereira may also refer to:

- Danilo (footballer, born 1986), Brazilian footballer
- Danilo Rios (born 1988), Brazilian footballer
- Danilo (footballer, born 1989) Brazilian footballer
- Danilo (footballer, born 1999), Brazilian footballer
