= 2012 Campeonato Baiano =

Campeonato Baiano de Futebol
- Season: 2012
- Champions: Bahia
- Relegated: Camaçari; Itabuna
- Copa do Brasil: Bahia; Vitória; Vitória da Conquista
- Série D: Feirense
- Matches: 140
- Goals: 405 (2.89 per match)
- Top goalscorer: Neto Baiano (Vitória) - 27 goals

The 2012 Campeonato Baiano de Futebol was the 108th season of Bahia's top professional football league. The competition began on January 18 and ended on May 13. Bahia won the championship for the 44th time, while Camaçari and Itabuna were relegated.

== Format ==
The championship has three stages. First stage, semifinals and finals. At first stage, the 12 teams play a double round-robin. The four best teams advance to the semifinals.

The champion and runner-up qualifies for the 2013 Copa do Brasil. The two worst teams are relegated. The best team that is not playing any Campeonato Brasileiro qualifies for the 2012 Campeonato Brasileiro Série D.

== Participating teams ==
Club	Home city	2011 result
Atlético de Alagoinhas	Alagoinhas	6th
Bahia	Salvador	3rd
Bahia de Feira	Feira de Santana	1st
Camaçari	Camaçari	8th
Feirense	Feira de Santana	7th
Fluminense de Feira	Feira de Santana	9th
Itabuna	Itabuna	2nd (2nd division)
Juazeiro	Juazeiro	10th
Juazeirense	Juazeiro	1st (2nd division)
Serrano	Vitória da Conquista	4th
Vitória	Salvador	2nd
Vitória da Conquista	Vitória da Conquista	5th

== First stage ==
=== Standings ===
Pos	Team	Pld	W	D	L	GF	GA	GD	Pts	Qualification or relegation
1	Bahia (A)	22	16	4	2	57	24	+33	52	Advances to the Semifinals
2	Vitória (A)	22	12	7	3	53	17	+36	43	Advances to the Semifinals
3	Feirense (A)	22	11	6	5	37	25	+12	39	Advances to the Semifinals
4	Vitória da Conquista (A)	22	10	5	7	32	28	+4	35	Advances to the Semifinals
5	Bahia de Feira	22	10	2	10	34	30	+4	32	
6	Atlético de Alagoinhas	22	7	10	5	31	24	+7	31	
7	Juazeiro	22	6	7	9	25	44	−19	25	
8	Juazeirense	22	6	6	10	21	35	−14	24	
9	Fluminense de Feira	22	5	8	9	21	36	−15	23	
10	Serrano	22	4	11	7	22	30	−8	23	
11	Camaçari (R)	22	4	7	11	28	43	−15	19	Relegation to Campeonato Baiano 2nd Division
12	Itabuna (R)	22	2	5	15	20	45	−25	11	Relegation to Campeonato Baiano 2nd Division

Updated to match(es) played on 08 December 2012. Source:
Rules for classification: 1) points; 2) goal difference; 3) number of goals scored.
(A) Advance to a further round; (R) Relegated

=== Results ===
Home \ Away	ATL	BAH	BAF	CAM	FEI	FLU	ITA	JUA	JSE	SER	VIT	VCO
Atlético de Alagoinhas		1–2	0–0	3–0	0–2	3–0	2–0	5–0	2–1	1–1	0–0	1–1
Bahia	3–3		3–2	5–1	3–2	4–0	7–1	1–1	2–0	3–2	0–0	2–0
Bahia de Feira	1–2	1–0		0–1	3–4	1–0	2–1	1–2	3–0	2–0	2–0	2–0
Camaçari	1–0	0–3	1–2		1–1	0–1	0–0	5–3	2–0	1–1	1–4	2–3
Feirense	3–0	0–1	2–0	0–0		4–2	1–0	1–1	4–0	2–0	1–1	3–1
Fluminense de Feira	1–1	0–2	2–2	2–1	1–1		0–3	2–3	1–1	1–1	1–1	0–3
Itabuna	1–1	3–4	0–4	3–2	2–3	2–2		0–1	0–1	1–1	0–2	1–2
Juazeiro	0–4	1–4	1–3	2–2	1–0	1–2	1–0		3–3	1–1	0–2	1–0
Juazeirense	1–1	1–1	1–0	1–1	0–1	0–1	3–0	1–0		2–2	3–2	1–0
Serrano	1–1	1–3	2–1	2–2	1–1	0–1	4–1	0–0	1–0		1–0	0–0
Vitória	5–0	3–2	4–0	3–1	6–1	1–1	0–0	6–1	4–1	3–0		1–1
Vitória da Conquista	0–0	1–2	4–2	4–3	1–0	1–0	2–1	1–1	4–0	3–0	0–5	

Source: RSSSF Brazil
Legend: Blue = home team win; Yellow = draw; Red = away team win.

== Final stage ==
=== Semifinals ===
==== First leg ====
April 22, 2012
16:00 UTC−03:00

Vitória da Conquista	1–0	Bahia
Carlinhos 53'	Report

Lomanto Júnior, Vitória da Conquista
Attendance: 4859

April 22, 2012
16:00 UTC−03:00

Feirense	1-0	Vitória
Cleiton 68'	Report

Estádio Pedro Amorim Duarte, Senhor do Bonfim
Attendance: 1445

==== Second leg ====
April 28, 2012
16:00 UTC−03:00

Vitória	3–2	Feirense
Pedro Ken 14'; Léo 40'; Neto Baiano 72'	Report	Danilo Cruz 52', 74'

Barradão, Salvador
Attendance: 10,736

3–3 on aggregate. Vitória won on better first stage record

April 29, 2012
16:00 UTC−03:00

Bahia	1-0	Vitória da Conquista
Rafael Donato 89'	Report

Estádio de Pituaçu, Salvador
Attendance: 19,358

1–1 on aggregate. Bahia won on better first stage record

=== Third place ===
==== First leg ====
May 6, 2012
16:00 UTC−03:00

Vitória da Conquista	1–4	Feirense
Cacá 37'	Report	André Cabeça 33' (pen.); Ananias 42'; Ermínio 49'; Ângelo 60'

Lomanto Júnior, Vitória da Conquista
Attendance: 517
Referee: Carlos Vila Nova

==== Second leg ====
May 12, 2012
16:00 UTC−03:00

Feirense	2-3	Vitória da Conquista
Danilo Cruz 3'; Crill 81'	Report	Roni 2'; Zé Leandro 43' (pen.); Wellington 57'

Estádio Pedro Amorim Duarte, Senhor do Bonfim
Attendance: 430
Referee: Clodoaldo Mendes da Anunciação

Feirense won 6–4 on aggregate.

=== Finals ===
==== First leg ====
May 6, 2012
16:00 UTC−03:00

Vitória	0–0	Bahia
	Report

Barradão, Salvador
Attendance: 31263
Referee: Marcelo de Lima Henrique

==== Second leg ====
May 12, 2012
16:00 UTC−03:00

Bahia	3-3	Vitória
Fahel 8'; Gabriel 45+1'; Diones 71'	Report	Neto Baiano 4', 54' (pen.); Dinei 56'

Estádio Pituaçu, Salvador
Attendance: 32157
Referee: Wilson Luiz Seneme

3–3 on aggregate. Bahia won on better first stage record.

== Top scorers ==
Pos	Player	Club	Goals
1	Neto Baiano	Vitória	27
2	Souza	Bahia	18
3	João Neto	Bahia de Feira	13
4	Júnior	Camaçari	11
5	Júnior	Bahia	9
6	Clodoaldo	Juazeirense	8
6	Danilo Cruz	Feirense	8
6	Deon	Atlético Alagoinhas	8
6	Robert	Atlético Alagoinhas	8
10	Carlinhos	Vitória da Conquista	7
10	Marquinhos	Vitória	7
10	Nino	Juazeiro	7
