= 2012 Campeonato Roraimense =

Campeonato Roraimense
- Season: 2012
- Champions: São Raimundo-RR
- Relegated: (no relegation)
- Copa do Brasil: São Raimundo-RR
- Série D: Náutico-RR (via Torneio Seletivo)

The 2012 Campeonato Roraimense was the 18th season of Roraima's top professional football league. The competition began 31 March and ended 9 June. Associação Esportiva Real was the defending champion

== Format ==
The six clubs played two single round robin tournaments. The group winners qualified for the final. The winner of both tournaments played for the state championship. If the same team won both tournament, they would have been automatically declared the champion. All games were played in Ribeirão, Boa Vista.

=== Qualifications ===
The champion qualified for 2013 Copa do Brasil.

== Participating teams ==
Club	Home city
Atlético Roraima	Boa Vista
GAS	Boa Vista
Náutico (RR)	Caracaraí
Real (RR)	São Luiz do Anauá
Rio Negro (RR)	Boa Vista
São Raimundo (RR)	Boa Vista

== First tournament ==
Pos	Team	Pld	W	D	L	GF	GA	GD	Pts	Qualification
1	São Raimundo-RR (A)	5	4	1	0	15	3	+12	13	Finals
2	Náutico-RR	5	3	2	0	26	4	+22	11	
3	Real	5	3	1	1	16	6	+10	10	
4	Rio Negro Clube	5	2	0	3	7	7	0	6	
5	Atlético Roraima	5	1	0	4	16	6	+10	3	
6	GAS	5	0	0	5	3	31	−28	0	

(A) Advance to a further round

== Second tournament ==
Pos	Team	Pld	W	D	L	GF	GA	GD	Pts	Qualification
1	Náutico-RR (A)	5	5	0	0	17	0	+17	15	Finals
2	São Raimundo-RR	5	4	0	1	14	3	+11	12	
3	Atlético Roraima	5	3	0	2	11	6	+5	9	
4	Real	5	3	0	2	16	6	+10	9	
5	Rio Negro Clube	5	1	0	4	8	12	−4	3	
6	GAS	5	0	0	5	7	37	−30	0	

(A) Advance to a further round

== Finals ==
June 09, 2012
17:00

Náutico-RR	0-2	São Raimundo-RR
		Lennon 1'; Deivid 25'

Attendance: Ribeirão, Boa Vista

== Overall standings ==
Pos	Team	Pld	W	D	L	GF	GA	GD	Pts	Qualification
1	São Raimundo-RR (C)	11	9	1	1	31	6	+25	28	2013 Copa do Brasil
2	Náutico-RR	11	8	2	1	43	6	+37	26	
3	Real	10	5	1	4	26	15	+11	16	
4	Atlético Roraima	10	4	0	6	18	29	−11	12	
5	Rio Negro Clube	10	3	0	7	15	19	−4	9	
6	GAS	10	0	0	10	10	68	−58	0	

(C) Champions
