= 2012 Campeonato Alagoano =

Campeonato Alagoano de Futebol
- Season: 2012
- Champions: CRB
- Relegated: Coruripe; Penedense
- Copa do Brasil: CRB; ASA
- Série D: CSA
- Copa do Nordeste: CRB; ASA
- Matches: 104
- Goals: 313 (3.01 per match)
- Top goalscorer: Lúcio Maranhão (ASA) (21 goals)

The 2012 Campeonato Alagoano de Futebol was the 82nd season of Alagoas's top professional football league. The competition began on January 14 and ended on May 12. CRB won the championship for the 26th time, while Associação Atlética Coruripe and Penedense were relegated.

== Format ==
The tournament consists of a double round-robin format, in which all twelve teams play each other twice, with classification split in two stages. Each round counts as one stage. The four better-placed teams of each stage will face themselves in playoffs matches, and the first stage champion will face the second stage champion. If the same team win both stages, it will be considered the champion.

The bottom two teams on overall classification will be relegated.

== Participating teams ==
Club	Home city	2011 result
ASA	Arapiraca	1st
CEO	Olho d'Água das Flores	1st (2nd division)
Corinthians	Pilar	4th
Coruripe	Coruripe	2nd
CRB	Maceió	6th
CSA	Maceió	8th
CSE	Palmeira dos Índios	7th
Murici	Murici	3rd
Penedense	Penedo	2nd (2nd division)
Sport Atalaia	Atalaia	5th

== First round (first stage) ==
=== Standings ===
Pos	Team	Pld	W	D	L	GF	GA	GD	Pts	Qualification
1	CRB (A)	9	6	1	2	12	4	+8	19	Advances to the Semifinals
2	Corinthians Alagoano (A)	9	5	1	3	24	17	+7	16	Advances to the Semifinals
3	ASA (A)	9	4	3	2	10	10	0	15	Advances to the Semifinals
4	Murici (A)	9	4	2	3	15	11	+4	14	Advances to the Semifinals
5	CSA	9	4	2	3	11	7	+4	14	
6	Sport Atalaia	9	3	2	4	14	14	0	11	
7	CSE	9	3	1	5	14	16	−2	10	
8	Coruripe	9	2	4	3	11	13	−2	10	
9	Penedense	9	2	2	5	9	16	−7	8	
10	CEO	9	2	2	5	11	23	−12	8	

Updated to match(es) played on 08 December 2012. Source:
Rules for classification: 1) Points; 2) wins; 3) goal difference; 4) head-to-head (if two teams involved); 5) goals scored; 6) draw
(A) Advance to a further round

=== Results ===
Home \ Away	ASA	CEO	CAL	COR	CRB	CSA	CSE	MUR	PEN	SAT
ASA		2–1				0–0	1–0	2–1	2–2	
CEO				1–1	0–1				4–2	2–1
Corinthians Alagoano	4–1	9–1						4–4	2–0	3–2
Coruripe	2–1		3–0					1–1	0–2	
CRB	0–1		0–1	1–1		3–0	2–1			
CSA		0–0	4–0	2–0			2–1			
CSE		4–2	2–1	2–0					2–2	2–4
Murici		3–0			0–2	2–1	2–0			2–0
Penedense					0–1	0–2		1–0		0–3
Sport Atalaia	0–0			3–3	0–2	1–0				

Source: RSSSF Brasil
Legend: Blue = home team win; Yellow = draw; Red = away team win.

=== Semifinals ===
==== First leg ====
February 15, 2012
20:00 UTC−03:00

Murici	1–1	CRB
Alex Murici 34'		Filipi 29'

Estádio José Gomes da Costa, Murici

February 16, 2012
16:00 UTC−03:00

ASA	5–0	Corinthians Alagoano
Valdivia 25'; Lúcio Maranhão 50', 61', 74'; Didira 73'

Coaracy da Mata Fonseca, Arapiraca

==== Second leg ====
February 25, 2012
14:30 UTC−03:00

Corinthians Alagoano	1–1	ASA
Fabiano 43'		Didira 31'

Dr. Rubens Canuto, Pilar

ASA won 6-1 on aggregated

February 26, 2012
14:30 UTC−03:00

CRB	5-0	Murici

Estádio Rei Pelé, Maceió

CRB won 6-1 on aggregated

=== Finals ===
==== First leg ====
February 29, 2012
21:00 UTC−03:00

ASA	2-2	CRB
Gabriel 64'; Lúcio Maranhão 86'		Jadílson 45+1'; Elsinho 67'

Coaracy da Mata Fonseca, Arapiraca

==== Second leg ====
March 4, 2012
16:00 UTC−03:00

CRB	2-2	ASA
Geovani 83', 108'		Lúcio Maranhão 31'; Audálio 93'
Penalties
Aloísio Pereira (penalty scored); Geovani (penalty scored); Rodrigão (penalty scored); Rodrigo Dantas (penalty scored)	4-2	(penalty missed) Lúcio Maranhão; (penalty scored) Gabriel; (penalty scored) Fabiano; (penalty missed) Jorginho

Estádio Rei Pelé, Maceió

== Second round (second stage) ==
=== Standings ===
Pos	Team	Pld	W	D	L	GF	GA	GD	Pts	Qualification
1	CSA (A)	9	7	1	1	22	8	+14	22	Advances to the Semifinals
2	ASA (A)	9	6	1	2	20	11	+9	19	Advances to the Semifinals
3	CSE (A)	9	3	3	3	18	14	+4	12	Advances to the Semifinals
4	Sport Atalaia (A)	9	3	3	3	13	14	−1	12	Advances to the Semifinals
5	CRB	9	3	2	4	17	17	0	11	
6	CEO	9	3	2	4	12	19	−7	11	
7	Murici	9	2	4	3	10	12	−2	10	
8	Corinthians Alagoano	9	2	4	3	11	14	−3	10	
9	Penedense	9	2	3	4	12	19	−7	9	
10	Coruripe	9	2	1	6	6	13	−7	7	

Updated to match(es) played on 08 December 2012. Source:
Rules for classification: 1) Points; 2) wins; 3) goal difference; 4) head-to-head (if two teams involved); 5) goals scored; 6) draw
(A) Advance to a further round

=== Results ===
Home \ Away	ASA	CEO	CAL	COR	CRB	CSA	CSE	MUR	PEN	SAT
ASA			4–0	2–0	2–1					3–1
CEO	2–1		1–1			2–1	0–5	2–1		
Corinthians Alagoano				1–1	0–1	1–2	2–0			
Coruripe		2–0			1–5	0–1	2–1			0–1
CRB		3–1						1–2	1–3	2–2
CSA	3–2				2–2			2–1	4–0	2–0
CSE	2–2				4–1	0–5		1–1		
Murici	0–2		2–2	1–0					2–2	
Penedense	1–2	1–1	2–2	1–0			0–4			
Sport Atalaia		4–2	1–2				1–1	0–0	3–2	

Source: RSSSF Brasil
Legend: Blue = home team win; Yellow = draw; Red = away team win.

=== Semifinals ===
==== First leg ====
April 25, 2012
15:15 UTC−03:00

Sport Atalaia	0-0	CSA

Luís Pontes, Atalaia

April 25, 2012
20:30 UTC−03:00

CSE	2-2	ASA
Peixinho 10', 66'		Gaúcho 02'; Gabriel 76'

Estádio Juca Sampaio, Palmeira dos Índios

==== Second leg ====
April 28, 2012
17:00 UTC−03:00

CSA	3-2	Sport Atalaia
Cleberson 15'; Jucemar 38'; Washington 66'		Da Silva 58', 90+3'

Rei Pelé, Maceió

CSA won 3-2 on aggregated

April 25, 2012
20:30 UTC−03:00

ASA	4-1	CSE
Henry 32'; Audálio 57'; Lúcio Maranhão 61'; Cal 68'		Paulo Vitor 09'

Coaracy da Mata, Arapiraca

ASA won 6-3 on aggregated

=== Finals ===
==== First leg ====
May 01, 2012
16:00 UTC−03:00

ASA	2-0	CSA
Lúcio Maranhão 19', 84'

Coaracy da Mata, Arapiraca

==== Second leg ====
May 05, 2012
15:15 UTC−03:00

CSA	0-0	ASA

Rei Pelé, Maceió

== Championship finals ==
=== First leg ===
May 09, 2012

CRB	2-1	ASA
Geovani 12'; Vanderlei 90'		Lúcio Maranhão 12'

Rei Pelé, Maceió

=== Second leg ===
May 12, 2012
16:00 UTC−03:00

ASA	0-0	CRB

Coaracy da Mata, Arapiraca

== Overall classification ==
Pos	Team	Pld	W	D	L	GF	GA	GD	Pts	Qualification or relegation
1	CRB (C)	24	11	7	6	40	26	+14	40	2013 Copa do Brasil and 2013 Copa do Nordeste
2	ASA	28	13	10	5	49	31	+18	49	2013 Copa do Brasil and 2013 Copa do Nordeste
3	CSA	22	12	5	5	36	19	+17	41	2013 Copa do Brasil and Série D
4	Corinthians Alagoano	20	7	6	7	36	37	−1	27	
5	Murici	20	6	7	7	26	29	−3	25	
6	Sport Atalaia	20	6	6	8	29	31	−2	24	
7	CSE	20	6	5	9	35	36	−1	23	
8	CEO	18	5	4	9	23	42	−19	19	
9	Coruripe (R)	18	4	5	9	17	26	−9	17	Relegation to Campeonato Alagoano 2nd Division
10	Penedense (R)	18	4	5	9	21	35	−14	17	Relegation to Campeonato Alagoano 2nd Division

Updated to match(es) played on 12 May 2012. Source: RSSSF Brasil
Rules for classification: 1) Champion and runners-up; 2)points; 3) wins; 4) goal difference; 5) goals scored; 6) head-to-head (if two teams involved); 7) decision game
(C) Champions; (R) Relegated
