= 2012 Campeonato Mineiro =

Campeonato Mineiro
- Season: 2012
- Champions: Atlético
- Relegated: Democrata GV and Uberaba
- Copa do Brasil: América; Tupi; Cruzeiro
- Série D: Nacional; Guarani
- Matches: 72
- Goals: 195 (2.71 per match)

The 2012 Campeonato da Primera Divisåo de Profissionais - Módulo I (official name: Campeonato Mineiro Chevrolet 2012), better known as 2012 Campeonato Mineiro, was the 98th season of Minas Gerais' top-flight football league. The season began at January 29 and ended on May 13.

== Format ==
The first stage is a single round robin. The top four teams will be qualified to the playoffs, and the bottom two teams will be relegated to the 2013 Módulo II

=== Qualifications ===
The best three teams will qualify for 2013 Copa do Brasil. The best two teams not playing in Campeonato Brasileiro Série A, Série B or Série C will qualify for 2012 Campeonato Brasileiro Série D.

=== Teams ===
Locations of the 2012 Módulo I teams

Clubs	Home City	2011 result
América Mineiro	Belo Horizonte	3rd
América-TO	Teófilo Otoni	4th
Atlético Mineiro	Belo Horizonte	2nd
Boa Esporte	Varginha	1st (Módulo II)
Caldense	Poços de Caldas	7th
Cruzeiro	Belo Horizonte	1st
EC Democrata	Governador Valadares	10th
Guarani	Divinópolis	8th
Nacional	Nova Serrana	2nd (Módulo II)
Tupi	Juiz de Fora	6th
Uberaba SC	Uberaba	9th
Villa Nova	Nova Lima	5th

== First stage ==
Pos	Team	Pld	W	D	L	GF	GA	GD	Pts	Qualification or relegation
1	Atlético Mineiro (A)	11	9	2	0	26	7	+19	29	Advances to the Semifinals
2	Cruzeiro (A)	11	9	1	1	27	28	−1	28	Advances to the Semifinals
3	América Mineiro (A)	11	7	0	4	20	15	+5	21	Advances to the Semifinals
4	Tupi (A)	11	5	2	4	14	11	+3	17	Advances to the Semifinals
5	Nacional-MG	11	5	1	5	18	20	−2	16	Série D
6	Guarani-MG	11	4	3	4	15	15	0	15	Série D
7	Caldense	11	3	4	4	8	14	−6	13	
8	Boa Esporte	11	3	3	5	9	10	−1	12	
9	América de Teófilo Otoni	11	3	2	6	12	16	−4	11	
10	Villa Nova	11	2	4	5	11	16	−5	10	
11	Democrata (R)	11	2	1	8	7	27	−20	7	Relegation to Modul II
12	Uberaba (R)	11	1	3	7	12	20	−8	6	Relegation to Modul II

Source: fmf (in Portuguese)
Rules for classification: 1st points; 2nd wins; 3rd goal difference; 4th goals scored; 5th head-to-head points (only when two teams are tie) 5th red cards received; 6th yellow cards received; 7th public draw
(A) Advance to a further round; (R) Relegated

=== Results ===
Home \ Away	AMG	ATO	CAM	BOA	CAL	CRU	DEM	GUA	NAC	TUP	UBE	VIN
América Mineiro			1–2	1–0	2–0			0–4		1–2		2–1
América de Teófilo Otoni	1–2		1–2	0–0			2–0		3–2	1–3		
Atlético Mineiro				2–0	2–0	2–2	3–0		4–2			
Boa Esporte					1–0	0–2	3–0	0–0			4–0	
Caldense			1–0			0–5			2–0	1–0		2–2
Cruzeiro	2–1	2–0						0–1		3–0	3–2	2–0
Democrata	1–3				1–1	0–2			0–3	2–1		
Guarani-MG		2–2	0–4		1–1		3–1					1–2
Nacional-MG	2–5			2–1		2–4		1–0			1–1	
Tupi			0–0	3–0				3–1	0–1		2–1	0–0
Uberaba	0–2	0–1	0–3		0–0		5–0	1–2				
Villa Nova		2–1	1–2	0–0			1–2		0–2		2–2	

Legend: Blue = home team win; Yellow = draw; Red = away team win.

== Playoffs ==
Semifinals
1	Atlético Mineiro	1	1	2
4	Tupi	1	0	1
2	Cruzeiro	2	1	3
3	América Mineiro	3	2	5

Finals
Atlético Mineiro	1	3	4
América Mineiro	1	0	1

== Overall table ==
Pos	Team	Pld	W	D	L	GF	GA	GD	Pts	Qualification or relegation
1	Atlético Mineiro (C)	15	11	4	0	32	9	+23	37	Finalist and 2013 Copa do Brasil Round of 16 (Note: Atlético Mineiro is qualified for 2013 Copa Libertadores and 2013 Copa do Brasil as 2012 Campeonato Brasileiro Série A runners-up)
2	América Mineiro	15	9	1	5	26	22	+4	28	Finalist and 2013 Copa do Brasil
3	Tupi	13	5	3	5	15	13	+2	18	Eliminated in Semifinals and 2013 Copa do Brasil
4	Cruzeiro	13	9	1	3	30	33	−3	28	Eliminated in Semifinals and 2013 Copa do Brasil
5	Nacional-MG	11	5	1	5	18	20	−2	16	Série D
6	Guarani-MG	11	4	3	4	15	15	0	15	Série D
7	Caldense	11	3	4	4	8	14	−6	13	
8	Boa Esporte	11	3	3	5	9	10	−1	12	2013 Copa do Brasil (Note: Boa Esporte qualified as 2012 Taça Minas Gerais champions)
9	América de Teófilo Otoni	11	3	2	6	12	16	−4	11	
10	Villa Nova	11	2	4	5	11	16	−5	10	
11	Democrata (R)	11	2	1	8	7	27	−20	7	Relegation to Modul II
12	Uberaba (R)	11	1	3	7	12	20	−8	6	Relegation to Modul II

Source: fmf (in Portuguese)
Rules for classification: 1st stage; 2nd points; 3rd wins; 4th goal difference; 5th goals scored; 6th head-to-head points (only when two teams are tie) 7th red cards received; 8th yellow cards received; 9th public draw
(C) Champions; (R) Relegated
