= 2011 Copa Governador do Estado da Bahia =

Copa Governador do Estado Primera e Segunda Divisao de Profissionais

Tournament details
- Country: Brazil
- Teams: 8

2011 Copa Governador do Estado da Bahia was the 13th edition of Bahia State Cup, and the third edition as Copa Governador do Estado da Bahia. Eight teams participated in the tournament.

The winner qualified for 2012 Campeonato Brasileiro Série D.

== Format ==
The clubs were divided into two groups of four. The top two teams of each group advanced to the semifinals.

== Participating teams ==
- Alagoinhas
- Bahia de Feira
- Vitória da Conquista
- Bahia
- Vitória
- Feirense
- Itabuna
- Serrano

== First stage ==
Key to colours in group tables
Group winners, runners-up advance to the Semifinals
Teams which can no longer advance to the Semifinals

=== Group 1 ===
Team	Pld	W	D	L	GF	GA	GD	Pts
Bahia								
Bahia de Feira								
Feirense								
Alagoinhas								

=== Group 2 ===
Team	Pld	W	D	L	GF	GA	GD	Pts
Vitória								
Vitória da Conquista								
Serrano								
Itabuna								
