= William Matheus =

Brazilian footballer

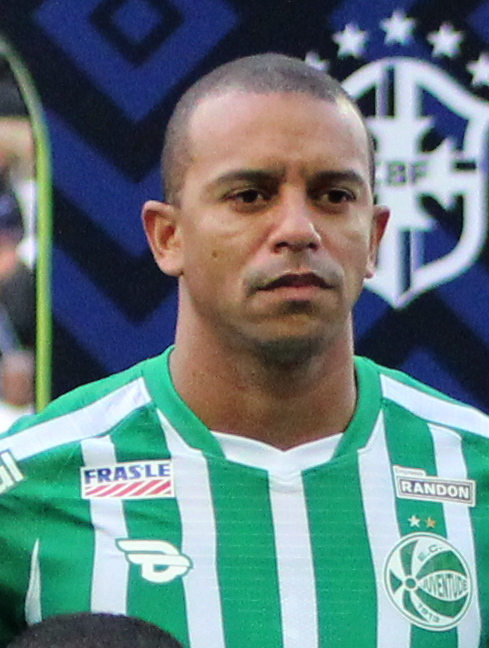

Personal information
- Full name: William Matheus da Silva
- Date of birth: 2 April 1990 (age 36)
- Place of birth: Nova Iguaçu, Brazil
- Height: 1.87 m (6 ft 2 in)
- Position: Left back

Youth career
- 2006–2009: Figueirense

Senior career*
Years	Team	Apps	(Gls)
2008–2010	Figueirense	22	(0)
2009	→ Botafogo-DF (loan)		
2010	→ Tombense (loan)		
2011	→ Democrata-GV (loan)	7	(0)
2011–2013	Boca Júnior	0	(0)
2011–2012	→ Bahia (loan)	17	(0)
2012	→ Vasco da Gama (loan)	21	(0)
2013	→ Goiás (loan)	50	(2)
2014	Palmeiras	10	(1)
2014–2017	Toulouse	24	(0)
2014–2015	Toulouse II	9	(1)
2016	→ Fluminense (loan)	20	(0)
2017–2020	Coritiba	120	(6)
2019	→ Guarani (loan)	12	(2)
2021	Shimizu S-Pulse	0	(0)
2021–2022	Juventude	46	(1)
2023	Figueirense	12	(0)
- * Club domestic league appearances and goals as of 00:51, 30 November 2021 (UTC)

William Matheus da Silva (born 2 April 1990), known as William Matheus, is a Brazilian footballer. Mainly a left back, he can also play as a centre back.

== Career ==
William Matheus came through the youth ranks at Figueirense and graduated to the first team in 2008, playing Campeonato Brasileiro Série A games in that season.

William Matheus then had loan spells with Botafogo (DF), Tombense and Democrata-GV playing state league football. In June 2011, he signed a three-year contract with Boca Júnior (SE) and loaned to Bahia in the same month, and became a member of their U23 team. He played in 2011 Copa Governador do Estado da Bahia. He remained at Bahia for the first part of 2012, playing for the first team in Campeonato Baiano, but was released from his loan contract in June having suffered from injury and not been able to get back into the team. Later that month he signed on loan with Vasco da Gama until the end of 2012, to play in the 2012 Campeonato Brasileiro Série A. Having played 21 games, including 19 starts, for Vasco in Série A he obtained a contract for 2013 with Goiás. Despite interest from the board, he chose not to sign a new contract with Goiás, and left at the end of the season having played in 59 games and scored 3 goals in all competitions.

In January 2014, William Matheus signed with Palmeiras to play the 2014 season, the year of the centenary of the club. After just sixteen appearances, Palmeiras accepted an offer from French club Toulouse to sign him in July 2014.

William Matheus signed a four-year contract with Toulouse on 29 July 2014. He made his Ligue 1 debut on 9 August 2014 in a 3–2 defeat against Nice. After two seasons in France he returned to Brazil on a loan agreement with Fluminense. He left Toulouse permanently on 4 February 2017, signing a deal with Coritiba.

In 2019, despite being a regular for Coritiba, he was loaned to Guarani for the Campeonato Paulista.
