= 2012 Campeonato Gaúcho =

Campeonato Gaúcho
- Season: 2012
- Champions: Internacional
- Relegated: Ypiranga; Avenida
- Série D: Veranópolis
- Copa do Brasil: Internacional; Caxias; Veranópolis
- Matches: 136
- Goals: 364 (2.68 per match)
- Top goalscorer: 11 goals: Leandro Damião (Internacional)

The 2012 Campeonato da Primeira Divisão de Futebol Profissional da FGF (2012 FGF First Division Professional Football Championship), better known as the 2012 Campeonato Gaúcho or Gaúcho, was the 92nd edition of the top flight football league of the Brazilian state of Rio Grande do Sul. The season began on 18 January and ended on 13 May. Internacional successfully defended its 2011 title in the final by defeating Caxias.

== Format ==
The sixteen clubs were divided into two groups, such that each team would play two matches to determine which four teams from each group would qualify to the play-offs, and which teams would be relegated. The first stage, called Taça Piratini 2012 (Piratini Cup 2012, won by Internacional), had each team from one group play one team in the other group. In the second stage, called Taça Farroupilha 2012 (Farroupilha Cup 2012, won by Grêmio) each team within each group played one match against another team in the same group. The two lowest ranked teams in the overall standings were relegated (Ypiranga and Avenida).

== Teams ==
Club	Home city	Position in 2010
Avenida	Santa Cruz do Sul	1st (2nd tier)
Canoas	Canoas	14th
Caxias	Caxias do Sul	7th tier
Cerâmica	Gravataí	2nd (2nd tier)
Cruzeiro (RS)	Porto Alegre	4th
Grêmio	Porto Alegre	2nd
Internacional	Porto Alegre	1st
Juventude	Caxias do Sul	3rd
Lajeadense	Lajeado	8th
Novo Hamburgo	Novo Hamburgo	9th
Pelotas	Pelotas	13th
Santa Cruz (RS)	Santa Cruz do Sul	11th
São José	Porto Alegre	6th
São Luiz	Ijuí	12th
Veranópolis	Veranópolis	10th
Ypiranga	Erechim	5th

== Taça Piratini ==
=== First stage ===
==== Group A standings ====
Pos	Team	Pld	W	D	L	GF	GA	GD	Pts	Qualification
1	Internacional (A)	8	5	1	2	16	9	+7	16	Advances to Quarterfinals
2	Juventude (A)	8	4	1	3	13	12	+1	13	Advances to Quarterfinals
3	São José-RS (A)	8	4	1	3	11	9	+2	13	Advances to Quarterfinals
4	Lajeadense (A)	8	3	2	3	9	9	0	11	Advances to Quarterfinals
5	Santa Cruz-RS	8	3	1	4	11	12	−1	10	
6	São Luiz	8	3	1	4	8	11	−3	10	
7	Ypiranga	8	0	3	5	6	12	−6	3	
8	Canoas	8	0	1	7	8	21	−13	1	

Rules for classification: 1st points; 2nd wins; 3rd goal difference; 4th goals scored; 5th red cards received; 6th yellow cards received; 7th public draw
(A) Advance to a further round

==== Group B standings ====
Pos	Team	Pld	W	D	L	GF	GA	GD	Pts	Qualification
1	Novo Hamburgo (A)	8	5	2	1	13	4	+9	17	Advances to Quarterfinals
2	Caxias (A)	8	5	2	1	12	5	+7	17	Advances to Quarterfinals
3	Veranópolis (A)	8	5	1	2	16	12	+4	16	Advances to Quarterfinals
4	Grêmio (A)	8	4	1	3	14	11	+3	13	Advances to Quarterfinals
5	Pelotas	8	3	0	5	7	13	−6	9	
6	Cruzeiro-RS	8	4	2	2	14	7	+7	14	
7	Cerâmica	8	2	2	4	9	14	−5	8	
8	Avenida	8	2	2	4	10	16	−6	8	

Rules for classification: 1st points; 2nd wins; 3rd goal difference; 4th goals scored; 5th red cards received; 6th yellow cards received; 7th public draw
(A) Advance to a further round

=== Playoffs ===
Quarter-finals
B1	Novo Hamburgo	1
A4	Lajeadense	0
A2	Juventude	3
B3	Veranópolis	1
A1	Internacional	1
B4	Grêmio	2
A3	Caxias	2
B3	São José-RS	0

Semi-finals
B1	Novo Hamburgo	3
A2	Juventude	2
B4	Grêmio	1(4)
A3	Caxias	1(5)

Final
B1	Novo Hamburgo	1(2)
A3	Caxias	1(3)

== Taça Farroupilha ==
=== First stage ===
==== Group A standings ====
Pos	Team	Pld	W	D	L	GF	GA	GD	Pts	Qualification
1	Internacional (A)	7	6	1	0	18	2	+16	19	Advances to Quarterfinals
2	Canoas (A)	7	3	3	1	9	6	+3	12	Advances to Quarterfinals
3	São José-RS (A)	7	3	2	2	9	10	−1	11	Advances to Quarterfinals
4	Ypiranga (A)	7	2	3	2	5	6	−1	9	Advances to Quarterfinals
5	Juventude	7	2	2	3	8	14	−6	8	
6	Lajeadense	7	1	4	2	7	8	−1	7	
7	São Luiz	7	1	2	4	7	12	−5	5	
8	Santa Cruz-RS	7	1	1	5	8	13	−5	4	

Updated to match(es) played on 10 April. Source:
Rules for classification: 1st points; 2nd wins; 3rd goal difference; 4th goals scored; 5th red cards received; 6th yellow cards received; 7th public draw
(A) Advance to a further round

==== Group B standings ====
Pos	Team	Pld	W	D	L	GF	GA	GD	Pts	Qualification
1	Grêmio (A)	7	6	0	1	20	5	+15	18	Advances to Quarterfinals
2	Veranópolis (A)	7	3	2	2	11	10	+1	11	Advances to Quarterfinals
3	Pelotas (A)	7	3	2	2	10	10	0	11	Advances to Quarterfinals
4	Cerâmica (A)	7	2	3	2	5	6	−1	9	Advances to Quarterfinals
5	Novo Hamburgo	7	2	3	2	6	10	−4	9	
6	Caxias	7	2	1	4	6	9	−3	7	
7	Cruzeiro-RS	7	1	3	3	9	11	−2	6	
8	Avenida	7	1	2	4	5	11	−6	5	

Rules for classification: 1st points; 2nd wins; 3rd goal difference; 4th goals scored; 5th red cards received; 6th yellow cards received; 7th public draw
(A) Advance to a further round

=== Playoffs ===
Quarter-finals
A1	Internacional	3
B4	Cerâmica	0
B2	Veranópolis	1
A3	São José-RS	0
B1	Grêmio	4
A4	Ypiranga	0
A2	Canoas	3
B3	Pelotas	1

Semi-finals
A1	Internacional	4
B2	Veranópolis	0
B1	Grêmio	1
A2	Canoas	0

Final
A1	Internacional	2
B1	Grêmio	1

== Tournament Finals ==
6 May 2012
16:00 (GMT -03:00)

Caxias	1–1	Internacional
Mateus 43'		Oscar 56'

Estádio Centenário
Attendance: 12,042
Referee: Jean Pierre Lima

13 May 2012
16:00 (GMT -03:00)

Internacional	2–1	Caxias
Sandro Silva 66'; Leandro Damião 71'		Michel 21'

Estádio Beira-Rio
Attendance: 23,028
Referee: Márcio Chagas da Silva

Internacional won 3–2 on aggregate.

== Overall table ==
The overall table considered only the matches played during the first stage of both group's Taças and would define the two teams that to be relegated for the 2013 season. The Taça Champions are ranked at the top of the table. The best placed team not playing in Campeonato Brasileiro Série A (Grêmio, Internacional), B or C (Caxias) was promoted to 2012 Campeonato Brasileiro Série D. The best three teams not qualified to 2013 Copa Libertadores qualified for 2013 Copa do Brasil.

Pos	Team	Pld	W	D	L	GF	GA	GD	Pts	Qualification or relegation
1	Internacional (C)	15	11	2	2	34	11	+23	35	2013 Copa do Brasil
2	Caxias	15	7	3	5	18	14	+4	24	2013 Copa do Brasil
3	Grêmio	15	10	1	4	34	16	+18	31	2013 Copa do Brasil Round of 16 (Note: Grêmio qualified for 2013 Copa Libertadores and 2013 Copa do Brasil Round of 16 as 2012 Campeonato Brasileiro Série A 3rd)
4	Veranópolis	15	8	3	4	27	22	+5	27	2013 Copa do Brasil
5	Novo Hamburgo	15	7	5	3	19	14	+5	26	
6	São José-RS	15	7	3	5	20	19	+1	24	
7	Juventude	15	6	4	5	21	26	−5	22	Série D (Note: Juventude qualified as 2012 Copa FGF champions)
8	Pelotas	15	6	2	7	17	23	−6	20	
9	Lajeadense	15	4	6	5	16	17	−1	18	
10	Cerâmica	15	4	5	6	14	20	−6	17	Série D (Note: Veranópolis, Novo Hamburgo, Pelotas, Lajeadense withdrew.)
11	São Luiz	15	4	3	8	15	23	−8	15	
12	Cruzeiro-RS	15	5	5	5	23	18	+5	14 (Note: Cruzeiro was docked 6 points for using a non-registered player)	
13	Santa Cruz-RS	15	4	2	9	19	25	−6	14	
14	Canoas	15	3	4	8	17	27	−10	13	
15	Avenida (R)	15	3	4	8	15	27	−12	13	Relegation to 2012 2ª divisão
16	Ypiranga (R)	15	2	6	7	11	18	−7	12	Relegation to 2012 2ª divisão

Updated to match(es) played on 10 April. Source: (in Portuguese)
Rules for classification: 1st points; 2nd wins; 3rd goal difference; 4th goals scored; 5th red cards received; 6th yellow cards received; 7th public draw
(C) Champions; (R) Relegated

== See also ==
- 2012 Copa FGF
