= 2012 Campeonato Paranaense =

Campeonato Paranaense - 1ª Divisão
- Season: 2012
- Champions: Coritiba
- Relegated: Roma Apucarana; Iraty
- Copa do Brasil: Coritiba; Atlético Paranaense; Arapongas
- Série D: Arapongas; Cianorte
- Matches: 134
- Goals: 374 (2.79 per match)
- Top goalscorer: Baiano (Operário) (13 goals)

The 2012 Campeonato Paranaense de Futebol Profissional da 1ª Divisão was the 97th season of Paraná's top professional football league. The competition began on January 22 and will end on May 13. Coritiba won the championship for the 36th time, while Roma Apucarana and Iraty were relegated.

== Format ==
The tournament consists of a double round-robin format, in which all twelve teams play each other twice, with classification split in two stages. Each round counts as one stage.

The better-placed teams of each stage will face themselves in a two-legged tie, with the team with the most points in the overall classification playing the second leg home, the winning team will then be declared champion. The finals are notable in the sense that goal difference will not be a tiebreaking criterion; if both teams tie on points the decision will go directly to a penalty shootout. If the same team is best-placed on both stages, it will automatically be declared champion.

The best two-placed teams in the overall classification not advancing to the finals and not from Curitiba will face themselves in a two-legged tie competing for the Torneio do Interior. The team with the most points will play the second leg home. The bottom two teams on overall classification will be relegated.

== Participating teams ==
Club	Home city	2011 result
Arapongas	Arapongas	5th
Atlético Paranaense	Curitiba	2nd
Cianorte	Cianorte	4th
Corinthians Paranaense	Curitiba	9th
Coritiba	Curitiba	1st
Iraty	Irati	8th
Londrina	Londrina	1st (2ª Divisão)
Operário	Ponta Grossa	3rd
Paranavaí	Paranavaí	7th
Rio Branco	Paranaguá	10th
Roma Apucarana	Apucarana	6th
Toledo	Toledo	2nd (2ª Divisão)

== First round ==
Pos	Team	Pld	W	D	L	GF	GA	GD	Pts	Qualification
1	Atlético Paranaense (A)	11	8	2	1	26	5	+21	26	Advances to the Finals
2	Coritiba	11	7	4	0	28	7	+21	25	
3	Cianorte	11	7	4	0	25	8	+17	25	
4	Arapongas	11	6	2	3	18	14	+4	20	
5	Toledo	11	5	2	4	15	13	+2	17	
6	Rio Branco-RR	11	4	1	6	15	25	−10	13	
7	Londrina	11	3	4	4	12	12	0	13	
8	Corinthians Paranaense	11	3	3	5	12	17	−5	12	
9	Roma Apucarana	11	2	5	4	10	19	−9	11	
10	Operário	11	2	3	6	15	22	−7	9	
11	Paranavaí	11	1	2	8	8	24	−16	5	
12	Iraty	11	0	4	7	8	26	−18	4	

Updated to match(es) played on 27 February 2011. Source:
Rules for classification: 1st points; 2nd wins; 3rd goal difference; 4th goals scored; 5th red cards received; 6th yellow cards received; 7th public draw
(A) Advance to a further round

=== Results ===
Home \ Away	AEC	CAP	CIA	CPR	CTB	ISC	LON	OPE	ACP	RIB	REA	TLD
Arapongas		2–1	1–1	4–1				1–2	2–0		1–1	
Atlético Paranaense				4–0	0–0		2–0				4–0	4–0
Cianorte		2–0			1–1	3–0	2–0			7–1		
Corinthians Paranaense			0–0				1–0	2–0	3–1	4–1	1–2	
Coritiba	4–1			2–0		5–1		4–1		1–1	5–0	
Iraty	1–2	0–3		0–0			1–1			1–2		0–5
Londrina	1–3				1–1				4–0	2–1	1–1	
Operário		0–1	2–3			2–2	0–2				2–1	
Paranavaí		1–3	0–3		1–3	1–0		2–2				2–3
Rio Branco-RR	0–1	0–2						3–2	1–0			3–2
Roma Apucarana			0–1			2–2			0–0	3–2		0–0
Toledo	2–0		1–2	1–0	0–2		0–0	1–0				

Legend: Blue = home team win; Yellow = draw; Red = away team win.

== Second roud ==
Pos	Team	Pld	W	D	L	GF	GA	GD	Pts	Qualification
1	Coritiba (A)	11	9	1	1	26	12	+14	28	Advances to the Finals
2	Atlético Paranaense	11	7	2	2	26	10	+16	23	
3	Operário	11	6	3	2	19	13	+6	21	
4	Arapongas	11	6	0	5	14	15	−1	18	
5	Londrina	11	5	2	4	17	6	+11	17	
6	Paranavaí	11	4	3	4	12	16	−4	15	
7	Rio Branco-RR	11	4	2	5	16	20	−4	14	
8	Cianorte	11	3	4	4	6	11	−5	13	
9	Toledo	11	3	3	5	11	12	−1	12	
10	Corinthians Paranaense	11	2	5	4	12	15	−3	11	
11	Iraty	11	1	2	8	10	30	−20	5	
12	Roma Apucarana	11	0	5	6	9	18	−9	5	

Updated to match(es) played on 06 December 2012. Source:
Rules for classification: 1st points; 2nd wins; 3rd goal difference; 4th goals scored; 5th red cards received; 6th yellow cards received; 7th public draw
(A) Advance to a further round

=== Results ===
Home \ Away	AEC	CAP	CIA	CPR	CTB	ISC	LON	OPE	ACP	RIB	REA	TLD
Arapongas					2–0	2–1	0–4			2–3		2–1
Atlético Paranaense	2–1		3–0			3–0		5–0	4–0	3–0		
Cianorte	0–2			1–0				0–0	0–0		2–1	0–0
Corinthians Paranaense	2–1	1–1			1–2	3–2						0–0
Coritiba		4–2	3–1				1–0		3–1			1–0
Iraty			0–0		1–5			2–4	0–0		1–0	
Londrina		3–0	0–1	1–0		4–0		0–1				1–1
Operário	0–1			2–2	2–2				2–1	4–0		2–0
Paranavaí	2–0			3–1			0–3			2–1	1–1	
Rio Branco-RR			2–1	1–1	1–2	5–2	1–0				2–2	
Roma Apucarana	0–1	1–1		1–1	1–3		1–1	0–2				
Toledo		0–2				4–1			1–2	1–0	3–1	

Legend: Blue = home team win; Yellow = draw; Red = away team win.

== Overall classification ==
Pos	Team	Pld	W	D	L	GF	GA	GD	Pts	Qualification or relegation
1	Coritiba (C)	22	16	5	1	54	19	+35	53	2013 Copa do Brasil
2	Atlético Paranaense	22	15	4	3	52	15	+37	49	2013 Copa do Brasil
3	Arapongas	22	12	2	8	32	29	+3	38	Torneio do Interior and Série D and 2013 Copa do Brasil
4	Cianorte	22	10	8	4	31	19	+12	38	Torneio do Interior and Série D and 2013 Copa do Brasil
5	Londrina	22	8	6	8	29	18	+11	30	
6	Operário	22	8	6	8	34	35	−1	30	
7	Toledo	22	8	5	9	26	25	+1	29	
8	Rio Branco-RR	22	8	3	11	31	45	−14	27	
9	Corinthians Paranaense	22	5	8	9	24	32	−8	23	
10	Paranavaí	22	5	5	12	20	40	−20	20	
11	Roma Apucarana (R)	22	2	10	10	19	37	−18	16	Relegation to Campeonato Paranaense Série Prata
12	Iraty (R)	22	1	6	15	18	56	−38	9	Relegation to Campeonato Paranaense Série Prata

Updated to match(es) played on 24 April 2011. Source:
Rules for classification: 1st seeding(winner of the final stage=1st, loser of the final stage=2nd); 2nd points; 3rd wins; 4th goal difference; 5th goals scored; 6th red cards received; 7th yellow cards received; 8th public draw
(C) Champions; (R) Relegated

== Finals ==
May 6, 2012
16:00 UTC−03:00

Atlético Paranaense	2–2	Coritiba
Bruno Mineiro 24'; Martín Ligüera 54'		Éverton Ribeiro 19'; Anderson Aquino 80'

Vila Capanema, Curitiba
Attendance: 8,460
Referee: Evandro Rogério Roman

May 13, 2012
16:00 UTC−03:00

Coritiba	0–0	Atlético Paranaense
Penalties
Lincoln (penalty scored); Roberto (penalty scored); Junior Urso (penalty scored); Everton Costa (penalty scored); Éverton Ribeiro (penalty scored)	5–4	(penalty scored) Alan Bahia; (penalty scored) Deivid; (penalty scored) Zezinho; (penalty missed) Guerrón; (penalty scored) Martín Ligüera

Couto Pereira, Curitiba
Attendance: 23,605
Referee: Adriano Milczvski
