= 2012 Campeonato Brasileiro Série D =

Campeonato Brasileiro Série D
- Season: 2012
- Champions: Sampaio Corrêa
- Promoted: Sampaio Corrêa; CRAC; Mogi Mirim; Baraúnas
- Matches: 190
- Goals: 483 (2.54 per match)
- Average attendance: 2,301.5

In 2012, the Campeonato Brasileiro Série D, the fourth division of the Brazilian League, was contested for the fourth time. Forty clubs competed, four of which eventually qualified for the Campeonato Brasileiro Série C to be contested in 2013.

== Competition format ==
The 40 teams were divided in eight groups of 5, playing in a double round-robin format. The two best ranked in each group at the end of 10 rounds qualified for the second stage, which was played in home-and-away system. Winners advanced to the third stage. These quarterfinal winners were promoted to the Série C 2013. According to the playoff structure, one team from each "mini-tournament" was promoted.

== Participating teams ==
State	Team	Qualification method
(Acre (state)) Acre	Atlético Acreano	2012 Campeonato Acreano best record ^{Note AC}
Alagoas	CSA	2012 Campeonato Alagoano best record
Amapá	Santos-AP	2011 Campeonato Amapaense runners-up ^{Note AP}
(Amazonas (Brazilian state)) Amazonas	Penarol	2011 Campeonato Amazonense champions
Bahia	Feirense	2012 Campeonato Baiano best record
Bahia	Vitória da Conquista	2011 Copa Governador do Estado da Bahia champions
Ceará	Horizonte	2012 Campeonato Cearense best record
(Federal District (Brazil)) Distrito Federal	Ceilândia	2012 Campeonato Brasiliense best record
(Federal District (Brazil)) Distrito Federal	Sobradinho	2012 Campeonato Brasiliense 3rd best record ^{Note TO}
Espírito Santo	Aracruz	2012 Campeonato Capixaba champions
Goiás	CRAC	2012 Campeonato Goiano best record
Goiás	AA Aparecidense	2012 Campeonato Goiano 3rd best record ^{Note GO}
Maranhão	Sampaio Corrêa	2011 Campeonato Maranhense champions
Mato Grosso	Mixto	2012 Campeonato Matogrossense best record
Mato Grosso do Sul	CENE	2011 Campeonato Sul-Matogrossense champions
Minas Gerais	Nacional-MG	2012 Campeonato Mineiro best record
Minas Gerais	Guarani-MG	2012 Campeonato Mineiro 2nd best record
Pará	Remo	2012 Campeonato Paraense 2nd best record ^{Note PA}
Paraíba	Sousa	2012 Campeonato Paraibano best record
(Paraná (state)) Paraná	Arapongas	2012 Campeonato Paranaense best record
(Paraná (state)) Paraná	Cianorte	2012 Campeonato Paranaense 2nd best record
Pernambuco	Petrolina	2012 Campeonato Pernambucano best record
Pernambuco	Ypiranga-PE	2012 Campeonato Pernambucano 2nd best record
Piauí	Comercial-PI	2011 Campeonato Piauiense champion
(Rio de Janeiro (state)) Rio de Janeiro	Volta Redonda	2012 Campeonato Carioca 2nd best record^{Note RJ}
(Rio de Janeiro (state)) Rio de Janeiro	Friburguense	2011 Copa Rio runner-up
Rio Grande do Norte	Baraúnas	2012 Campeonato Potiguar best record
Rio Grande do Sul	Juventude	2011 Copa FGF champions
Rio Grande do Sul	Cerâmica	2012 Campeonato Gaúcho 6th best record ^{Note RS}
Rondônia	Vilhena	2012 Campeonato Rondoniense champions
Roraima	Náutico-RR	Roraima qualifiers 2012
(São Paulo (state)) São Paulo	Mogi Mirim	2012 Campeonato Paulista best record
(São Paulo (state)) São Paulo	Mirassol	2012 Campeonato Paulista 2nd best record
(Santa Catarina (state)) Santa Catarina	Metropolitano	2012 Campeonato Catarinense best record
(Santa Catarina (state)) Santa Catarina	Concórdia	2011 Copa Santa Catarina 5th
Sergipe	Itabaiana	2012 Campeonato Sergipano champions
Tocantins	(all teams withdrew)	2011 Campeonato Tocantinense champions
Brazil	Araguaína	2011 Série C Group A 5th
Brazil	Campinense	2011 Série C Group B 5th
Brazil	Marília	2011 Série C Group C 5th
Brazil	Brasil de Pelotas	2011 Série C Group D 5th

Notes:

(Acre (state)) Acre:
Atlético Acreano replaced Rio Branco-AC.

Amapá:
Santos-AP replaced Trem.

(Goiás) Goias:
Associação Atlética Aparecidense replaced Itumbiara.

Pará:
Remo replaced Cametá Sport Club.

Rio Grande do Sul:
Cerâmica replaced Veranópolis Esporte Clube, Novo Hamburgo, São José (PA), Pelotas and Lajeadense.

(Rio de Janeiro (state)) Rio de Janeiro:
Volta Redonda replaced Resende.

(Santa Catarina (state)) Santa Catarina:
Concórdia replaced Brusque and Metropolitano. Concórdia qualified as last placed team.

Tocantins:

All Tocantins-based teams withdrew. Since Tocantins was already allocated a berth in Group 5 the berth passed on to Goias. No Goias-based team wanted the berth so it passed on to the Federal District.

== First stage ==
Key to colours in group tables
Group winners, runners-up advance to the Round of 16
Teams eliminated from the competition

=== Group 1 (AC-AM-PA-RO-RR) ===
Team	Pld	W	D	L	GF	GA	GD	Pts
(Pará) Remo	8	5	1	2	20	16	+4	16
(Rondônia) Vilhena	8	5	0	3	17	10	+7	15
(Acre (state)) Atlético Acreano	8	4	1	3	19	15	+4	13
(Amazonas (Brazilian state)) Penarol	8	3	0	5	16	16	0	9
(Roraima) Náutico-RR	8	2	0	6	9	24	−15	6

=== Group 2 (AP-MA-MT-PI-TO) ===
Team	Pld	W	D	L	GF	GA	GD	Pts
(Maranhão) Sampaio Corrêa	8	8	0	0	25	2	+23	24
(Mato Grosso) Mixto	8	3	3	2	13	9	+4	12
(Piauí) Comercial-PI	8	2	2	4	6	13	-7	5^{1}
(Amapá) Santos-AP	8	1	4	3	9	16	-7	4^{1}
(Tocantins) Araguaína	8	0	3	5	4	17	−13	3

^{1} Three points deducted for use of irregular player.

=== Group 3 (CE-PB-PE-RN) ===
Team	Pld	W	D	L	GF	GA	GD	Pts
(Rio Grande do Norte) Baraúnas	8	4	3	1	12	7	+5	15
(Paraíba) Campinense	8	4	2	2	11	8	+3	14
(Ceará) Horizonte	8	3	4	1	9	5	+4	13
(Pernambuco) Ypiranga-PE	8	2	2	4	13	15	−2	8
(Pernambuco) Petrolina	8	0	3	5	9	19	−10	3

=== Group 4 (AL-BA-PB-SE) ===
Team	Pld	W	D	L	GF	GA	GD	Pts
(Alagoas) CSA	8	6	2	0	15	3	+12	20
(Paraíba) Sousa	8	3	4	1	7	5	+2	13
(Bahia) Feirense	8	3	2	3	9	12	-3	11
(Sergipe) Itabaiana	8	1	3	4	5	10	−5	6
(Bahia) Vitória da Conquista	8	1	1	6	7	13	−6	4

=== Group 5 (DF-GO-MS) ===
Team	Pld	W	D	L	GF	GA	GD	Pts
(Goiás) CRAC	8	4	3	1	15	9	+6	15
(Federal District (Brazil)) Ceilândia	8	4	2	2	14	14	0	14
(Mato Grosso do Sul) CENE	8	4	1	3	17	11	+6	13
(Goiás) Aparecidense	8	3	1	4	11	15	−4	10
(Federal District (Brazil)) Sobradinho	8	0	3	5	8	16	−8	3

=== Group 6 (ES-MG-RJ) ===
Team	Pld	W	D	L	GF	GA	GD	Pts
(Rio de Janeiro (state)) Friburguense	8	4	4	0	13	4	+9	16
(Minas Gerais) Nacional-MG	8	3	4	1	7	5	+2	13
(Espírito Santo) Aracruz	8	2	3	3	5	7	-2	9
(Rio de Janeiro (state)) Volta Redonda	8	2	2	4	5	6	−1	8
(Minas Gerais) Guarani-MG	8	1	3	4	3	11	−8	6

=== Group 7 (PR-RS-SC-SP) ===
Team	Pld	W	D	L	GF	GA	GD	Pts
(Paraná (state)) Cianorte	8	5	3	0	14	4	+10	18
(São Paulo (state)) Mogi Mirim	8	3	4	1	10	7	+3	13
(Rio Grande do Sul) Cerâmica	8	3	2	3	10	7	+3	11
(São Paulo (state)) Marília	8	1	4	3	7	15	−8	7
(Santa Catarina (state)) Concórdia	8	1	1	6	7	15	−8	4

=== Group 8 (PR-RS-SC-SP) ===
Team	Pld	W	D	L	GF	GA	GD	Pts
(Santa Catarina (state)) Metropolitano	8	4	2	2	8	7	+1	14
(Rio Grande do Sul) Juventude	8	3	3	2	7	4	+3	12
(Paraná (state)) Arapongas	8	2	4	2	6	6	0	10
(Rio Grande do Sul) Brasil de Pelotas	8	2	3	3	6	7	−1	9
(São Paulo (state)) Mirassol	8	1	4	2	8	11	−3	7

== Final Stage ==
Round of 16
(Pará) Remo	0	2	2
(Mato Grosso) Mixto	2	1	3
(Maranhão) Sampaio Corrêa	2	4	6
(Rondônia) Vilhena	2	1	3
(Rio Grande do Norte) Baraúnas	1	2	3
(Paraíba) Sousa	0	0	0
(Alagoas) CSA	1	0	1
(Paraíba) Campinense	2	0	2
(Goiás) CRAC (a)	1	1	2
(Minas Gerais) Nacional-MG	2	0	2
(Rio de Janeiro (state)) Friburguense	0	2	2
Ceilândia	0	1	1
(Paraná (state)) Cianorte	1	3	4
(Rio Grande do Sul) Juventude	3	0	3
(Santa Catarina (state)) Metropolitano	1	1	2
(São Paulo (state)) Mogi Mirim (a)	0	2	2

Quarterfinals
(Mato Grosso) Mixto	1	0	1
(Maranhão) Sampaio Corrêa* (a)	1	0	1
(Rio Grande do Norte) Baraúnas*	1	2	3
(Paraíba) Campinense	1	0	1
(Goiás) CRAC* (a)	2	1	3
(Rio de Janeiro (state)) Friburguense	0	3	3
(Paraná (state)) Cianorte	2	1	3 (2)
(São Paulo (state)) Mogi Mirim* (pen)	1	2	3 (4)

Semifinals
(Maranhão) Sampaio Corrêa	1	1	2
(Rio Grande do Norte) Baraúnas	1	0	1
(Goiás) CRAC	1	2	3
(São Paulo (state)) Mogi Mirim	1	0	1

Finals
(Maranhão) Sampaio Corrêa	1	2	3
(Goiás) CRAC	1	0	1

^{*} Promoted to 2013 Série C.
