= 2012 Campeonato Catarinense =

Campeonato Catarinense - Divisão Principal
- Season: 2012
- Champions: Avaí
- Relegated: Marcílio Dias; Brusque
- Copa do Brasil: Avaí; Figueirense
- Série D: Metropolitano
- Matches played: 96
- Goals scored: 324 (3.38 per match)
- Top goalscorer: 14 goals Aloísio; Rafael Costa
- Longest unbeaten run: 9 matches by Figueirense

The 2012 Campeonato Catarinense - Divisão Principal was the 89th season of Santa Catarina's top professional football league. The competition began on 22 January and ended on 25 May. Avaí was the champion after win the two matches at finals against Figueirense.

== Format ==
First stage

- All ten teams play a round-robin playing once against each other team.
- The top 4 teams qualify for the semi-finals which are played 1st vs 4th and 2nd vs 3rd. Where games are tied the higher placed team progresses. The final is played at the ground of the higher placed team and, as in the semi-final, in a tied game the higher placed team wins.

Second stage

- All ten teams play a round-robin playing once against each other team.
- The top 4 teams qualify for the semi-finals which are played 1st vs 4th and 2nd vs 3rd. Where games are tied the higher placed team progresses. The final is played at the ground of the higher placed team and, as in the semi-final, in a tied game the higher placed team wins.

Finals

- Home-and-away playoffs between the winners of the first and second stages.
- The winner of the Finals is crowned champion.

== Stadia and locations ==
Team	Location	Stadium	Capacity
Atlético de Ibirama	Ibirama	Estádio da Baixada	6,000
Avaí	Florianópolis	Ressacada	15,000
Brusque	Brusque	Augusto Bauer	5,000
Camboriú	Camboriú	Robertão	3,000
Chapecoense	Chapecó	Arena Condá	15,000
Criciúma	Criciúma	Heriberto Hülse	28,000
Figueirense	Florianópolis	Orlando Scarpelli	19,000
Joinville	Joinville	Arena Joinville	22,000
Metropolitano	Blumenau	Sesi	5,000
Marcílio Dias	Itajaí	Hercílio Luz	12,000

== First phase ==
=== First stage ===
Team	Pld	W	D	L	GF	GA	GD	Pts
Figueirense	9	6	2	1	27	12	+15	20
Chapecoense	9	5	3	1	14	9	+5	18
Metropolitano	9	5	1	3	16	13	+3	16
Avaí	9	5	0	4	14	11	+3	15
Atlético Ibirama	9	4	2	3	16	13	+3	14
Joinville	9	3	3	3	17	14	+3	12
Criciúma	9	3	3	3	21	19	+2	12
Camboriú	9	3	0	6	7	14	-7	9
Marcilio Dias	9	1	3	5	9	22	-13	6
Brusque	9	1	1	7	4	18	-14	4

=== Second stage ===
Team	Pld	W	D	L	GF	GA	GD	Pts
Figueirense	9	6	2	1	24	11	+13	20
Joinville	9	6	1	2	21	11	+10	19
Avaí	9	5	2	2	20	9	+11	17
Criciúma	9	5	0	4	19	2	+7	15
Chapecoense	9	4	3	2	18	13	+3	15
Atlético Ibirama	9	4	2	3	18	19	-1	14
Metropolitano	9	4	1	4	15	18	-3	13
Camboriú	9	3	1	5	12	21	-9	13
Brusque	9	1	1	7	7	16	-9	4
Marcilio Dias	9	0	1	8	6	30	-24	1

=== Final standings ===
Team	Pld	W	D	L	GF	GA	GD	Pts
Figueirense	18	12	4	2	51	23	+28	40
Chapecoense	18	9	6	3	32	22	+10	33
Avaí	18	10	2	6	34	20	+14	32
Joinville	18	9	4	5	38	25	+13	31
Metropolitano	18	9	2	7	31	31	0	29
Atlético Ibirama	18	8	4	6	35	32	+3	28
Criciúma	18	8	3	7	40	31	+9	27
Camboriú	18	6	1	11	19	35	-16	19
Brusque	18	2	2	14	12	35	-23	8
Marcilio Dias	18	1	4	13	15	52	-37	7

== Knockout phase ==
=== Semi-finals ===
Team 1	Agg.	Team 2	1st leg	2nd leg
Joinville (Brazil)	2–4	(Brazil) Figueirense	1–1	1–3
Chapecoense (Brazil)	2–3	(Brazil) Avaí	1–1	1–2

=== Finals ===
Team 1	Agg.	Team 2	1st leg	2nd leg
Avaí (Brazil)	5–1	(Brazil) Figueirense	3–0	2–1
