= Estádio Genervino da Fonseca =

Football stadium in Goiás, Brazil

Estádio Genervino da Fonseca Arena Rifertil
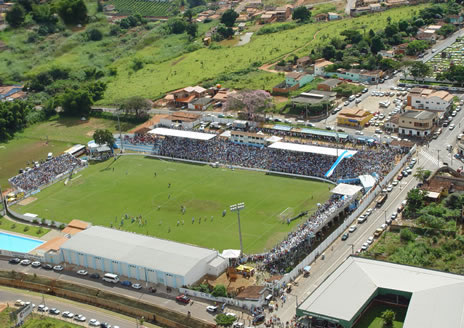
- The stadium during the 2004 Campeonato Goiano final
- Interactive map of Estádio Genervino da Fonseca; Arena Rifertil
- Full name: Estádio Genervino Evangelista da Fonseca
- Address: Brazil
- Location: Catalão, Goiás
- Coordinates: 18.1674°S 47.9532°W
- Owner: Clube Recreativo e Atlético Catalano
- Capacity: 8.500

Construction
- Built: 1959
- Opened: 1960

Estádio Genervino Evangelista da Fonseca, also known as Arena Rifertil, is a Brazilian stadium on the city of Catalão, Goiás.

Belongs to Clube Recreativo e Atlético Catalano (CRAC), it is one of the oldest stadiums in the state. In addition to state tournaments, it has played host to Brazilian Championships on the third and fourth tier division, as well as amateur championships in the city of Catalão and region. In 2007, it could not host the games of the third phase of the Série C due to its reduced size.

With the help of the community through donations and labor, it now has a capacity for 8,500 spectators. The stadium has a regular lawn, 13 press booths and a grandstand.

== History ==
On 2022, after an agreement between the company Adubos Rifertil and the city hall of Catalão, the place became also known as Arena Rifertil. On the other hand, the company undertook to carry out several improvements in the sports plaza, such as covering the stands of the stadium (metallic structure/masonry), construction of a new facade and the adaptation of different equipment, among other actions.

== Nicknames ==
The stadium is also known as La Bombonera do Cerrado, Toca do Leão, and Quadradão do cerrado.
