= Vicente (footballer, born 1983) =

Brazilian footballer

Personal information
- Full name: Wellington da Silva Vicente
- Date of birth: April 30, 1983 (age 43)
- Place of birth: Maceió, Alagoas, Brazil
- Height: 1.72 m (5 ft 8 in)
- Position: Left-back

Youth career
- 2003–2004: Iraty

Senior career*
Years	Team	Apps	(Gls)
2005– 2014	Iraty		
2007–2008	→ Marília (loan)		
2008–2009	→ Ponte Preta (loan)	24	(4)
2009	→ Coritiba (loan)	3	(0)
2010	→ Ponte Preta (loan)	6	(0)
2010–2011	→ Ceará (loan)	35	(0)
2012	→ São Caetano (loan)		
2012–2014	→ Ceará (loan)		
2015	São Bernardo		
2016	Capivariano		
2016–2017	Sergipe		
2017	Botafogo-SP		
2018–2019	Atlético de Alagoinhas		
2019	Fluminense de Feira		
2020	Atlético de Alagoinhas		
- * Club domestic league appearances and goals

Wellington da Silva Vicente (born April 30, 1983), known as Vicente, is a Brazilian former professional footballer who played as a left-back.
