= Danilo (footballer, born 1989) =

Brazilian footballer

Personal information
- Full name: José Marcio Danilo Pereira da Silva
- Date of birth: 21 January 1989 (age 37)
- Place of birth: Maceió, Alagoas, Brazil
- Height: 1.85 m (6 ft 1 in)
- Position: Midfielder

Team information
- Current team: Ituano FC

Youth career
- 2005–2007: Corinthians Alagoano

Senior career*
Years	Team	Apps	(Gls)
2008	Centro Sportivo Alagoano	0	(0)
2008–2009	Gloria Bistriţa	1	(0)
2010	Santa Rita	0	(0)
2010	Viana	0	(0)
2011	Capivariano (SP)		
2011–	Ituano FC		
- * Club domestic league appearances and goals

José Marcio Danilo Pereira da Silva (born 21 January 1989), known as Danilo, is a Brazilian footballer, who currently plays for Ituano Futebol Clube.

== Biography ==
Born in Alagoas state, Danilo started his career at Corinthians Alagoano and left for Centro Sportivo Alagoano in January 2008, signed a 3-year contract. The team won the state league and qualified to 2008 Campeonato Brasileiro Série C. In mid-2008, Danilo along with teammate Fábio Henrique Lima and Mauricio were scouted by Romanian clubs, which Danilo left for Gloria Bistriţa. Danilo played his single appearance in Romanian Liga I on 21 September 2008, substituted Ciprian Petre in the 70th minute. That match the team lost 1–2 to CFR Cluj.

In January 2010, Danilo returned to Brazil for Campeonato Alagoano newcomer Santa Rita. Near to the end of the state league, in March 2010, he left for Viana to play for Maranhão state cup, which he scored 1 goal.
