= Clodoaldo (footballer, born December 1978) =

Brazilian footballer

Personal information
- Full name: Francisco Clodoaldo Chagas Ferreira
- Date of birth: 28 December 1978 (age 47)
- Place of birth: Ipú, Brazil
- Height: 1.60 m (5 ft 3 in)
- Position: Striker

Youth career
- Fortaleza

Senior career*
Years	Team	Apps	(Gls)
1998–2001	Fortaleza		
2001	Beira-Mar		
2002–2005	Fortaleza		
2004	→ Ituano (loan)		
2004	→ Treze (loan)		
2006–2007	Ceará		
2007	Potiguar de Mossoró		
2008	Icasa		
2008–2009	Guarany de Sobral		
2009	Juazeirense		
2009	Central		
2009	Ríver		
2010	Fluminense de Feira		
2010	Guarany de Sobral		
2010	Ceará		
2011	Juazeirense		
2011	Guarany de Sobral		
2011–2012	Ceará		
2012	→ Juazeirense (loan)		
2012	Horizonte		
2013	Goytacaz		
2014	Quixadá		
2014–2015	Nova Russas		
2015	Ferroviário		
2015	Guarany de Sobral		
2015	Santa Quitéria		
2016	Juazeirense		
2017–2019	Fortaleza		
- * Club domestic league appearances and goals

Clodoaldo Francisco Chagas Ferreira, better known as Clodoaldo (born 28 December 1978), is a Brazilian former footballer who played as a striker.

== Career ==
Having started his career at Fortaleza, Clodoaldo is the club's second-highest scorer in history with 126 goals, and is also in the club's hall of fame due to his fan loyalty and his achievements on the field. He was promoted to Série A with the club in 2002 and has won the state championship on five occasions. In 2006, he had a controversial departure directly to rival Ceará, where he was unable to repeat his good performance. In 2017, he was "forgiven" by the fans, returning to the club to retire. He last played in 2019 at the Copa Fares Lopes.

In 2002 interestingly, he gained national fame from that year onwards, when several reports popularized "Rap do Clodô" and the song "Uh terror o Clodoaldo é matador" throughout the country.

== Personal life ==
Clodoaldo faced several problems related to alcoholism during his career. In 2004 and in 2017, the player was arrested in his hometown of Ipú due to non-payment of child support for his daughter.

In 2020, during the COVID-19 pandemic, he became known as an ambassador for Fortaleza EC, promoting several actions. In 2025, Clodoaldo began his degree in a physical education course.

== Honours ==
Fortaleza

- Campeonato Cearense: 2000, 2001, 2003, 2004, 2005

Ceará

- Campeonato Cearense: 2006, 2011

Individual

- 2001 Campeonato Cearense top scorer: 16 goals
- 2003 Campeonato Cearense top scorer: 19 goals
