= Estádio Municipal Coaracy da Mata Fonseca =

Stadium in Arapiraca, Brasil

- Fumeirão
- Interactive map of Estádio Municipal Coaracy da Mata Fonseca
- Full name: Estádio Municipal Coaracy da Mata Fonseca
- Location: Arapiraca, Alagoas, Brazil
- Coordinates: 9.7479°S 36.6670°W
- Capacity: 17,000
- Surface: Grass

Construction
- Opened: August 5, 1953

Tenant
- Agremiação Sportiva Arapiraquense

Estádio Municipal Coaracy da Mata Fonseca, also known as Fumeirão, is a stadium in Arapiraca, Brazil. It has a capacity of 17,000 spectators. It is the home of Agremiação Sportiva Arapiraquense of the Campeonato Brasileiro Série C.
