= Danilo Rios =

Brazilian footballer (born 1988)

Personal information
- Full name: Danilo Rios Maia Pereira
- Date of birth: June 9, 1988 (age 38)
- Place of birth: Jacobina, Brazil
- Height: 1.77 m (5 ft 10 in)
- Position: Attacking midfielder

Team information
- Current team: Fortaleza

Youth career
- 2004–2005: Bahia

Senior career*
Years	Team	Apps	(Gls)
2006	Bahia		
2007–2011	Grêmio	2	(0)
2008	→ Vitória (loan)		
2008	→ Atlético Mineiro (loan)		
2009	→ Guarani (loan)		
2009	→ São Caetano (loan)	2	(0)
2010	→ Juventude (loan)		
2010	→ Duque de Caxias (loan)	9	(1)
2012	Duque de Caxias	8	(0)
2013	Nacional-AM	8	(3)
2013–	Fortaleza	22	(4)
- * Club domestic league appearances and goals

Danilo Rios Maia Pereira (born June 9, 1988), or simply Danilo Rios, is a Brazilian footballer who plays as a attacking midfielder for Fortaleza Esporte Clube.
