= Feirense Futebol Clube =

Feirense
- Full name: Independente Esporte Clube (1997–2007); Feirense Futebol Clube (2007–2022); Clube Atlético Universitário (2022–2023); Feirense Futebol Clube (2024–)
- Founded: January 12, 1997
- Ground: Estádio Joia da Princesa, Feira de Santana, Bahia state, Brazil
- Capacity: 16,274
Home colours	Away colours

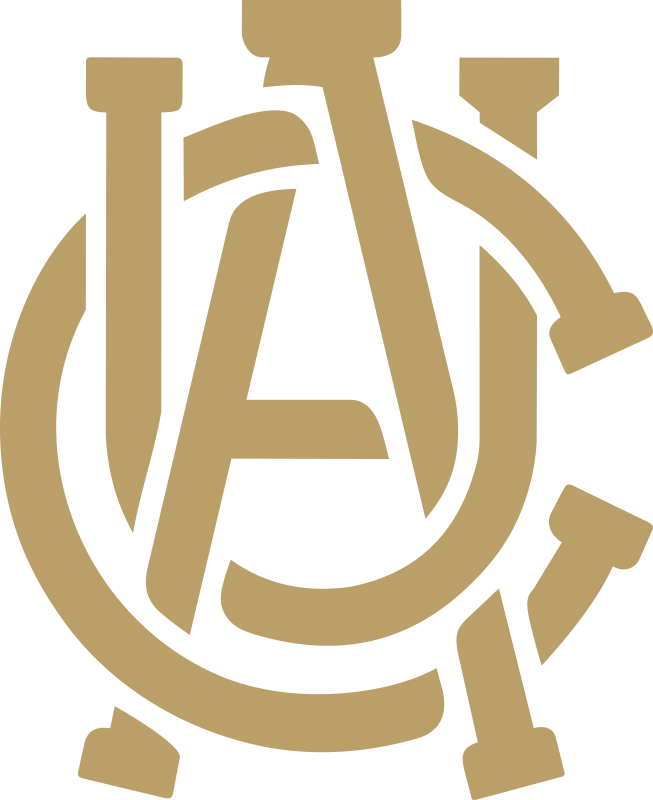
Clube Atlético Universitário

Feirense Futebol Clube, commonly known as Feirense, is a Brazilian football club based in Feira de Santana, Bahia state.

== History ==
The club was founded on January 12, 1997 with the name Independente Esporte Clube. Feirense won the Campeonato Baiano Second Level in 2007.

In 2022 the club operated under the name CA Universitário in the city of Santo Antônio de Jesus, returning to the old name and to the city of Feira de Santana in 2024.

== Achievements ==
- Campeonato Baiano Second Level
  - Champions (1): 2007

== Stadium ==
Feirense Futebol Clube play their home games at Estádio Municipal Alberto Oliveira, nicknamed Estádio Joia da Princesa. The stadium has a maximum capacity of 16,274 people.
