= 2017 Sport Club do Recife season =

Sport Recife
2017 season
- Chairman: Arnaldo Barros
- Manager: Daniel Paulista; Thiago Duarte (c); Junior Camara (c); Ney Franco; Vanderlei Luxemburgo; Júnior Lopes (c)
- Stadium: Ilha do Retiro
- Série A: 15th
- Pernambucano: Champions (41st title)
- Copa do Brasil: Round of 16
- Copa do Nordeste: Runners-up
- Copa Sudamericana: Quarter-finals
- Top goalscorer: League: André (16); All: André (27)
Home colours	Away colours	Third colours

The 2017 season was Sport Recife's 113th season in the club's history. Sport competed in the Campeonato Pernambucano, Copa do Nordeste, Copa Sudamericana, Série A and Copa do Brasil.

== Squad ==
Note: Flags indicate national team as defined under FIFA eligibility rules; some limited exceptions apply. Players may hold more than one non-FIFA nationality.

No.	Pos.	Nation	Player
1	GK	BRA	Magrão
2	DF	COL	Oswaldo Henríquez
3	DF	BRA	Ronaldo Alves
4	DF	BRA	Durval (captain)
5	MF	BRA	Rodrigo (on loan from Tombense)
6	DF	CHI	Eugenio Mena (on loan from Cruzeiro)
7	MF	COL	Reinaldo Lenis
8	MF	BRA	Anselmo (on loan from Internacional)
9	FW	BRA	Leandro Pereira (on loan from Palmeiras)
10	FW	BRA	Osvaldo
11	FW	BRA	Marquinhos (on loan from Internacional)
15	MF	BRA	Bruno Xavier
17	FW	BRA	Rogério
19	GK	BRA	Agenor
20	MF	BRA	Thomás
21	MF	BRA	Rithely

No.	Pos.	Nation	Player
22	DF	BRA	Neris
23	DF	BRA	Raul Prata
27	DF	BRA	Samuel Xavier
28	MF	BRA	Wesley
31	GK	BRA	Lucas Ferreira
32	GK	BRA	Mailson Tenório
37	FW	BRA	Juninho
40	DF	BRA	Evandro
44	MF	BRA	Thallyson
56	DF	BRA	Sander
63	FW	BRA	Índio
87	MF	BRA	Diego Souza
88	MF	BRA	Patrick
89	DF	BRA	Igor Ribeiro
90	FW	BRA	André
97	MF	BRA	Everton Felipe

=== Out on loan ===
Note: Flags indicate national team as defined under FIFA eligibility rules; some limited exceptions apply. Players may hold more than one non-FIFA nationality.

No.	Pos.	Nation	Player
—	GK	BRA	Saulo (on loan at Vila Nova)
—	MF	BRA	Fábio Matos (on loan at Paysandu)
—	MF	BRA	Fabrício (on loan at Oeste)
—	MF	BRA	Naldinho (on loan at ABC)

No.	Pos.	Nation	Player
—	MF	BRA	Neto Moura (on loan at América Mineiro)
—	MF	BRA	Régis (on loan at Bahia)
—	MF	BRA	Ronaldo (on loan at (Saudi Arabia) Ohod Club)

== Statistics ==
=== Overall ===
Games played	80 (12 Copa do Nordeste, 14 Pernambucano, 8 Copa do Brasil, 8 Sudamericana, 38 Série A)
Games won	32 (6 Copa do Nordeste, 6 Pernambucano, 5 Copa do Brasil, 3 Sudamericana, 12 Série A)
Games drawn	20 (2 Copa do Nordeste, 7 Pernambucano, 1 Copa do Brasil, 1 Sudamericana, 9 Série A)
Games lost	28 (4 Copa do Nordeste, 1 Pernambucano, 2 Copa do Brasil, 4 Sudamericana, 17 Série A)
Goals scored	111
Goals conceded	99
Goal difference	+12
Best results (goal difference)	5–0 (H) v Juazeirense - Copa do Nordeste - 2017.03.11
Worst result (goal difference)	0–5 (A) v Grêmio - Série A - 2017.09.02
Top scorer	André (27)

Source: Sport Recife official website

=== Goalscorers ===
Place	Pos.	Nat.	No.	Name	Copa do Nordeste	Campeonato Pernambucano	Copa do Brasil	Copa Sudamericana	Série A	Total
1	FW	(Brazil)	90	André	4	1	2	4	16	27
2	FW	(Brazil)	10	Diego Souza	4	3	2	1	11	21
3	FW	(Brazil)	17	Rogério	4	2	2	0	2	10
4	FW	(Brazil)	28	Juninho	2	3	1	0	0	6
=	MF	(Brazil)	21	Rithely	1	0	2	2	1	6
5	DF	(Brazil)	3	Ronaldo Alves	2	1	0	1	1	5
6	MF	(Brazil)	8	Everton Felipe	1	1	1	0	1	4
=	FW	(Brazil)	9	Leandro Pereira	0	1	3	0	0	4
=	MF	(Colombia)	7	Reinaldo Lenis	0	2	0	0	2	4
7	FW	(Brazil)	10	Osvaldo	0	0	0	0	3	3
=	MF	(Brazil)	12	Patrick	0	0	0	0	3	3
8	DF	(Brazil)	4	Durval	1	0	1	0	0	2
=	MF	(Brazil)	30	Fábio Matos	1	1	0	0	0	2
=	DF	(Brazil)	13	Matheus Ferraz	0	1	0	0	1	2
=	FW	(Brazil)	12	Paulo Henrique	0	2	0	0	0	2
=	MF	(Brazil)	15	Thallyson	0	0	1	0	1	2
9	DF	(Chile)	6	Eugenio Mena	0	0	0	0	1	1
=	MF	(Brazil)	36	Fabrício Bigode	0	0	0	1	0	1
=	MF	(Brazil)	11	Marquinhos	0	0	0	0	1	1
=	MF	(Brazil)	25	Neto Moura	0	1	0	0	0	1
=	DF	(Brazil)	27	Samuel Xavier	0	0	1	0	0	1
=	MF	(Brazil)	11	Thomás Bedinelli	0	0	0	0	1	1
=	FW	(Brazil)	63	Wildson Índio	0	1	0	0	0	1
				Own goals	0	0	0	0	1	1
				Total	20	20	16	9	46	111

=== Managers performance ===
Name	From	To	P	W	D	L	GF	GA	Avg%	Ref
(Brazil) Daniel Paulista	25 January 2017	3 December 2017	27	15	6	6	45	28	62%	
(Brazil) Thiago Duarte (c)	1 March 2017	1 March 2017	1	0	1	0	1	1	33%	
(Brazil) Junior Câmara (c)	3 April 2017	3 April 2017	1	0	1	0	2	2	33%	
(Brazil) Ney Franco	30 March 2017	21 May 2017	17	6	4	7	25	31	43%	
(Brazil) Vanderlei Luxemburgo	31 May 2017	26 October 2017	33	10	8	15	37	42	38%	
(Brazil) Júnior Lopes (c)	6 July 2017	6 July 2017	1	1	0	0	2	0	100%	

(c) Indicates the caretaker manager

=== Home record ===
Recife	São Lourenço da Mata
Ilha do Retiro	Arena Pernambuco
Capacity: 32,983	Capacity: 44,300
38 matches (18 wins 14 draws 6 losses)	2 matches (1 win 1 loss)

=== Overview ===
Competition	First match	Last match	Starting round	Final position	Record							
Competition	First match	Last match	Starting round	Final position	Pld	W	D	L	GF	GA	GD	Win %
Série A	15 April	2 December	Matchday 1	15th	38	12	9	17	46	58	−12	31.58
Pernambucano	28 January	28 June	First stage	Winners	14	6	7	1	20	12	+8	42.86
Copa do Brasil	8 February	31 May	First round	10th	8	5	1	2	16	7	+9	62.50
Copa Sudamericana	6 April	2 November	First round	8th	8	3	1	4	9	9	+0	37.50
Copa do Nordeste	25 January	24 May	Group stage	Runners-up	12	6	2	4	20	13	+7	50.00
Total					80	32	20	28	111	99	+12	40.00

Source: Competitions

== Friendlies ==
=== Ariano Suassuna Trophy ===
22 January 2017	Sport (Brazil)	1–1 (4–2 p)	(Bolivia) The Strongest	São Lourenço da Mata
(UTC-3)	Rithely 10'	Report	Bejarano 44'	Stadium: Estádio Governador Carlos Wilson Campos (Arena Pernambuco); Attendance: 7,956; Referee: Péricles Bassols
	Penalties
	Matheus Ferraz (penalty scored); Reinaldo Lenis (penalty scored); Oswaldo Henríquez (penalty missed); Paulo Henrique (penalty scored); Marquinhos (penalty scored)		(penalty scored) Fernando Martelli; (penalty missed) Gabriel Valverde; (penalty missed) Alejandro Chumacero; (penalty scored) Rodrigo Vargas

== Official Competitions ==
=== Copa do Nordeste ===
==== Group stage ====
25 January 2017 1	Sport	1–0	Sampaio Corrêa	Recife
19:45 (UTC-3)	Ronaldo Alves 3'	Report		Stadium: Estádio Adelmar da Costa Carvalho (Ilha do Retiro); Attendance: 5,475; Referee: Renan Roberto de Souza

5 February 2017 2	Juazeirense	0–1	Sport	Juazeiro
17:00 (UTC-3)		Report	Fábio 90+4'	Stadium: Estádio Adauto Moraes; Attendance: 2,295; Referee: Leandro Saraiva Dantas de Oliveira

11 February 2017 3	Sport	2–2	River	Recife
19:15 (UTC-3)	Rithely 32'; André 81'	Report	Wesley 13'; Viola 84'	Stadium: Estádio Adelmar da Costa Carvalho (Ilha do Retiro); Attendance: 8,430; Referee: Caio Max Augusto Vieira

25 February 2017 4	River	1–2	Sport	Teresina
21:00 (UTC-3)	Viola 75'	Report	Diego Souza 20'; Durval 44'	Stadium: Estádio Lindolfo Monteiro; Attendance: 3,767; Referee: Clizaldo Luiz Maroja Di Pace França

11 March 2017 5	Sport	5–0	Juazeirense	Recife
20:30 (UTC-3)	Ronaldo Alves 9'; André 25', 68'; Rogério 87', 90'	Report		Stadium: Estádio Adelmar da Costa Carvalho (Ilha do Retiro); Attendance: 3,886; Referee: Julio Cesar Ferreira Farias

22 March 2017 6	Sampaio Corrêa	2–1	Sport	São Luís
21:45 (UTC-3)	Daniel Barros 21'; Hiltinho 53'	Report	Rogério 69'	Stadium: Estádio Governador João Castelo (Castelão); Attendance: 284; Referee: Italo Medeiros de Azevedo

==== Quarter-finals ====
30 March 2017	Campinense	3–1	Sport	Campina Grande
21:15 (UTC-3)	Magno Souza 28'; Augusto 29'; Reinaldo Alagoano 83'	Report	Juninho 81'	Stadium: Estádio Governador Ernani Sátyro (Amigão); Attendance: 6,949; Referee: Denis da Silva Ribeiro Serafim

2 April 2017	Sport	3–1 (4–2 p)	Campinense	Recife
16:00 (UTC-3)	Rogério 4'; Diego Souza 17', 59'	Report	Fernando Pires 48'	Stadium: Estádio Adelmar da Costa Carvalho (Ilha do Retiro); Attendance: 19,308; Referee: Antonio Dib Moraes de Sousa
	Penalties
	Penalty scored		Penalty scored

==== Semi-finals ====
29 April 2017	Sport	1–2	Santa Cruz	Recife
18:30 (UTC-3)	Diego Souza 39'	Report	Léo Costa 32'; Halef Pitbull 75'	Stadium: Estádio Adelmar da Costa Carvalho (Ilha do Retiro); Attendance: 23,574; Referee: Cláudio Francisco Lima E Silva

3 May 2017	Santa Cruz	0–2	Sport	Recife
21:45 (UTC-3)		Report	Everton Felipe 17'; André 78'	Stadium: Estádio José do Rego Maciel (Arruda); Attendance: 35,231; Referee: Péricles Bassols Pegado Cortez

==== Finals ====
17 May 2017	Sport	1–1	Bahia	Recife
21:45 (UTC-3)	Juninho 81'	Report	Juninho 56'	Stadium: Estádio Adelmar da Costa Carvalho (Ilha do Retiro); Attendance: 26,685; Referee: Antônio Dib Moraes de Sousa

24 May 2017	Bahia	1–0	Sport	Salvador
21:45 (UTC-3)	Edigar Junio 13'	Report		Stadium: Itaipava Arena Fonte Nova; Attendance: 40,738; Referee: Francisco Carlos do Nascimento

==== Record ====
Final Position	Points	Matches	Wins	Draws	Losses	Goals For	Goals Away	Win%
2nd	20	12	6	2	4	20	13	55%

=== Campeonato Pernambucano ===
==== First stage ====
28 January 2017 1	Sport	3–0	Central	Recife
17:00 (UTC-3)	Rogério 29'; Diego Souza 75' (pen.); Lenis 89'	Report		Stadium: Estádio Adelmar da Costa Carvalho (Ilha do Retiro); Attendance: 3,821; Referee: Marcelo de Lima Henrique

2 February 2017 2	Salgueiro	0–0	Sport	Salgueiro
21:30 (UTC-3)		Report		Stadium: Estádio Cornélio de Barros; Attendance: 3,058; Referee: Emerson Luiz Sobral

15 February 2017 3	Sport	1–0	Belo Jardim	Recife
21:30 (UTC-3)	Paulo Henrique 43'	Report		Stadium: Estádio Adelmar da Costa Carvalho (Ilha do Retiro); Attendance: 2,215; Referee: Niélson Nogueira Dias

18 February 2017 4	Santa Cruz	1–1	Sport	Recife
16:30 (UTC-3)	Halef Pitbull 61'	Report	Diego Souza 41'	Stadium: Estádio José do Rego Maciel (Arruda); Attendance: 12,408; Referee: Sebastião Rufino Filho

1 March 2017 5	Sport	1–1	Náutico	Recife
21:45 (UTC-3)	Neto Moura 40'	Report	Erick 29' (pen.)	Stadium: Estádio Adelmar da Costa Carvalho (Ilha do Retiro); Attendance: 3,430; Referee: José Woshington da Silva

5 March 2017 6	Náutico	2–1	Sport	São Lourenço da Mata
16:00 (UTC-3)	Marco Antônio 55'; Erick 64'	Report	Ronaldo Alves 70'	Stadium: Estádio Governador Carlos Wilson Campos (Arena Pernambuco); Attendance: 6,419; Referee: Luiz Cláudio Sobral

19 March 2017 7	Belo Jardim	0–1	Sport	Recife
16:00 (UTC-3)		Report	Paulo Henrique 57'	Stadium: Estádio José do Rego Maciel (Arruda); Attendance: 437; Referee: Emerson Sobral

26 March 2017 8	Sport	1–1	Santa Cruz	Recife
16:00 (UTC-3)	Rogério 68'	Report	Pereira 83'	Stadium: Estádio Adelmar da Costa Carvalho (Ilha do Retiro); Attendance: 10,221; Referee: Deborah Cecília

3 April 2017 9	Sport	2–2	Salgueiro	Recife
20:00 (UTC-3)	Wildson 27'; Fábio Matos 58'	Report	João Victor 2' (o.g.); Álvaro 69'	Stadium: Estádio Adelmar da Costa Carvalho (Ilha do Retiro); Attendance: 4,902; Referee: Gilberto Castro Júnior

9 April 2017 10	Central	1–3	Sport	Recife
16:00 (UTC-3)	Gabriel Silva 75'	Report	Juninho 70'; Leandro Pereira 85'; Lenis 90+2'	Stadium: Estádio José do Rego Maciel (Arruda); Attendance: 616; Referee: José Woshington da Silva

==== Semi-finals ====
16 April 2017	Sport	3–2	Náutico	Recife
16:00 (UTC-3)	Diego Souza 51'; Juninho 90', 90+2'	Report	Marco Antônio 45'; Anselmo 64'	Stadium: Estádio Adelmar da Costa Carvalho (Ilha do Retiro); Attendance: 15,082; Referee: Wagner do Nascimento Magalhães

23 April 2017	Náutico	1–1	Sport	São Lourenço da Mata
16:00 (UTC-3)	Giovanni 33'	Report	Matheus Ferraz 34'	Stadium: Estádio Governador Carlos Wilson Campos (Arena Pernambuco); Attendance: 19,541; Referee: Anderson Daronco

==== Finals ====
7 May 2017	Sport	1–1	Salgueiro	Recife
16:00 (UTC-3)	André 27'	Report	Jean Carlos 90+11'	Stadium: Estádio Adelmar da Costa Carvalho (Ilha do Retiro); Attendance: 22,750; Referee: José Woshington da Silva

28 June 2017	Salgueiro	0–1	Sport	Salgueiro
21:45 (UTC-3)		Report	Everton Felipe 81'	Stadium: Estádio Cornélio de Barros; Referee: Wilton Pereira Sampaio

==== Record ====
Final Position	Points	Matches	Wins	Draws	Losses	Goals For	Goals Away	Win%
1st	25	14	6	7	1	20	12	59%

=== Copa do Brasil ===
==== First round ====
8 February 2017	CSA	1–4	Sport	Maceió
22:30 (UTC-3)	Alex Henrique 33'	Report	Rithely 24'; Everton Felipe 50'; Rogério 61'; Thallyson 76'	Stadium: Estádio Rei Pelé; Attendance: 6,312; Referee: Igor Junio Benevenuto

==== Second round ====
22 February 2017	Sport	3–0	Sete de Dourados	Recife
21:45 (UTC-3)	Leandro Pereira 10', 23'; Rogério 47'	Report		Stadium: Estádio Adelmar da Costa Carvalho (Ilha do Retiro); Attendance: 2,020; Referee: Adriano Milczvski

==== Third round ====
8 March 2017	Boavista	0–3	Sport	Saquarema
21:45 (UTC-3)		Report	André 19', 73'; Diego Souza 30'	Stadium: Estádio Elcyr Resende de Mendonça; Attendance: 619; Referee: Marcelo Aparecido de Souza

15 March 2017	Sport	1–0	Boavista	Recife
21:45 (UTC-3)	Diego Souza 31'	Report		Stadium: Estádio Adelmar da Costa Carvalho (Ilha do Retiro); Attendance: 2,014; Referee: Edmar Campos Encarnação

==== Fourth round ====
12 April 2017	Sport	2–1	Joinville	Recife
21:45 (UTC-3)	Rithely 24'; Juninho 83'	Report	Bruno Batata 47'	Stadium: Estádio Adelmar da Costa Carvalho (Ilha do Retiro); Attendance: 4,781; Referee: Rodolpho Toski Marques

19 April 2017	Joinville	2–1 (3–4 p)	Sport	Joinville
21:45 (UTC-3)	Bruno Rodrigues 76'; Marlyson 89'	Report	Leandro Pereira 72'	Stadium: Arena Joinville; Attendance: 4,934; Referee: Dewson Fernando Freitas da Silva
	Penalties
	Penalty scored		Penalty scored

==== Round of 16 ====
26 April 2017	Botafogo	2–1	Sport	Rio de Janeiro
21:45 (UTC-3)	Guilherme 56', 83'	Report	Samuel Xavier 9'	Stadium: Estádio Olímpico Nilton Santos (Engenhão); Attendance: 12,271; Referee: Braulio da Silva Machado

31 May 2017	Sport	1–1	Botafogo	Recife
21:45 (UTC-3)	Durval 67'	Report	Roger 12'	Stadium: Estádio Adelmar da Costa Carvalho (Ilha do Retiro); Attendance: 10,385; Referee: Raphael Claus

==== Record ====
Final Position	Points	Matches	Wins	Draws	Losses	Goals For	Goals Away	Win%
10th	16	8	5	1	2	16	7	66%

=== Copa Sudamericana ===
==== First round ====
6 April 2017	Sport (Brazil)	3–0	(Uruguay) Danubio	Recife
19:15 (UTC-3)	Rithely 31'; Diego Souza 41'; Fabrício Bigode 67'			Stadium: Estádio Adelmar da Costa Carvalho (Ilha do Retiro); Attendance: 13,582; Referee: Jorge Baliño (Argentina)

11 May 2017	Danubio (Uruguay)	3–0 (2–4 p)	(Brazil) Sport	Montevideo
21:45 (UTC-3)	dos Santos 15'; Malrechauffe 23' (pen.), 56' (pen.)			Stadium: Estadio Centenario; Attendance: 2,000; Referee: Eduardo Gamboa (Chile)
	Penalties
	Lucas Olaza (penalty scored); Gonzalo González (penalty missed); Juan Manuel Olivera (penalty scored); Marcelo Tabárez (penalty missed)		(penalty scored) Everton Felipe; (penalty scored) Raul Prata; (penalty scored) Fabrício Bigode; (penalty scored) André

==== Second round ====
6 July 2017	Sport (Brazil)	2–0	(Argentina) Arsenal de Sarandí	Recife
21:45 (UTC-3)	André 55', 73'	Report		Stadium: Estádio Adelmar da Costa Carvalho (Ilha do Retiro); Attendance: 7,694; Referee: Gery Vargas (Bolivia)

27 July 2017	Arsenal de Sarandí (Argentina)	2–1	(Brazil) Sport	Sarandí
19:15 (UTC-3)	Brunetta 43'; Contreras 64'	Report	André 83'	Stadium: Estadio Julio Humberto Grondona; Attendance: 14,000; Referee: Jesus Valenzuela (Venezuela)

==== Round of 16 ====
13 September 2017	Sport (Brazil)	3–1	(Brazil) Ponte Preta	Recife
19:15 (UTC-3)	Ronaldo Alves 8'; Rithely 45'; André 76'	Report	Felipe Saraiva 83'	Stadium: Estádio Adelmar da Costa Carvalho (Ilha do Retiro); Attendance: 6,254; Referee: Gustavo Murillo (Colombia)

20 September 2017	Ponte Preta (Brazil)	1–0	(Brazil) Sport	Campinas
19:15 (UTC-3)	Lucca 17'	Report		Stadium: Estádio Moisés Lucarelli; Attendance: 3,890; Referee: Roddy Zambrano (Ecuador)

==== Quarter-finals ====
26 October 2017	Sport (Brazil)	0–2	(Colombia) Junior	Recife
21:45 (UTC-3)		Report	Yony González 71', 86'	Stadium: Estádio Adelmar da Costa Carvalho (Ilha do Retiro); Attendance: 27,014; Referee: Fernando Rapallini (Argentina)

2 November 2017	Junior (Colombia)	0–0	(Brazil) Sport	Barranquilla
22:45 (UTC-5)		Report		Stadium: Estadio Metropolitano Roberto Meléndez (El Metro); Attendance: 32,354; Referee: Daniel Feorczuk (Uruguay)

==== Record ====
Final Position	Points	Matches	Wins	Draws	Losses	Goals For	Goals Away	Win%
8th	10	8	3	1	4	9	9	41%

=== Série A ===
14 May 2017 1	Ponte Preta	4–0	Sport	Campinas
16:00 (UTC-3)	Lucca 39'; Nino Paraíba 44'; Clayson 72', 90+2'			Stadium: Estádio Moisés Lucarelli; Attendance: 3,104; Referee: Marcos Mateus Pereira

21 May 2017 2	Sport	1–1	Cruzeiro	Recife
19:00 (UTC-3)	Diego Souza 33'	Report	Alisson 19'	Stadium: Estádio Adelmar da Costa Carvalho (Ilha do Retiro); Attendance: 4,459; Referee: João Batista de Arruda

28 May 2017 3	Sport	4–3	Grêmio	Recife
18:00 (UTC-3)	André 34', 73', 83'; Matheus Ferraz 64'	Report	Fernandinho 5', 86'; Rafael Thyere 17'	Stadium: Estádio Adelmar da Costa Carvalho (Ilha do Retiro); Attendance: 3,441; Referee: Jailson Macedo Freitas

4 June 2017 4	Avaí	1–0	Sport	Florianópolis
11:00 (UTC-3)	Rômulo 33'	Report		Stadium: Estádio Aderbal Ramos da Silva (Ressacada); Attendance: 4,420; Referee: Wagner Reway

7 June 2017 5	Sport	2–0	Flamengo	Recife
21:45 (UTC-3)	Osvaldo 50'; Thomás Bedinelli 83'	Report		Stadium: Estádio Adelmar da Costa Carvalho (Ilha do Retiro); Attendance: 12,617; Referee: Anderson Daronco

10 June 2017 6	Vasco da Gama	2–1	Sport	Rio de Janeiro
19:00 (UTC-3)	Luís Fabiano 62'; Douglas Luiz 90'	Report	André 90+3'	Stadium: Estádio Vasco da Gama (São Januário); Attendance: 10,273; Referee: Caio Max Augusto Vieira

14 June 2017 7	Sport	0–0	São Paulo	Recife
19:30 (UTC-3)		Report		Stadium: Estádio Adelmar da Costa Carvalho (Ilha do Retiro); Attendance: 11,904; Referee: Héber Roberto Lopes

18 June 2017 8	Sport	1–3	Vitória	Recife
19:00 (UTC-3)	Diego Souza 45'	Report	Uillian Correia 17'; Kanu 37'; André Lima 78'	Stadium: Estádio Adelmar da Costa Carvalho (Ilha do Retiro); Attendance: 7,135; Referee: Andre Luiz de Freitas Castro

21 June 2017 9	Atlético Mineiro	2–2	Sport	Belo Horizonte
21:45 (UTC-3)	Felipe Santana 21'; Fred 39'	Report	Osvaldo 16'; Diego Souza 64'	Stadium: Estádio Raimundo Sampaio (Independência); Attendance: 12,027; Referee: Wilton Pereira Sampaio

24 June 2017 10	Santos	0–1	Sport	Santos
19:00 (UTC-3)		Report	Osvaldo 80'	Stadium: Estádio Urbano Caldeira (Vila Belmiro); Attendance: 7,272; Referee: Rafael Traci

2 July 2017 11	Sport	1–0	Atlético Paranaense	Recife
16:00 (UTC-3)	Diego Souza 75'	Report		Stadium: Estádio Adelmar da Costa Carvalho (Ilha do Retiro); Attendance: 11,031; Referee: Grazianni Maciel Rocha

10 July 2017 12	Coritiba	0–3	Sport	Curitiba
20:00 (UTC-3)		Report	Mena 18'; Rogério 84'; Walisson Maia 90+1' (o.g.)	Stadium: Estádio Major Antônio (Couto Pereira); Attendance: 10,192; Referee: Jailson Macedo Freitas

13 July 2017 13	Sport	3–0	Chapecoense	São Lourenço da Mata
19:30 (UTC-3)	André 62', 90+4'; Diego Souza 90'	Report		Stadium: Estádio Governador Carlos Wilson Campos (Arena Pernambuco); Attendance: 25,861; Referee: Dyorgines Jose Padovani de Andrade

17 July 2017 14	Botafogo	2–1	Sport	Rio de Janeiro
20:00 (UTC-3)	Rodrigo Lindoso 1'; Guilherme 53'	Report	Rithely 8'	Stadium: Estádio Olímpico Nilton Santos (Engenhão); Attendance: 17,313; Referee: Ricardo Marques Ribeiro

20 July 2017 15	Sport	4–0	Atlético Goianiense	Recife
20:00 (UTC-3)	Patrick 6'; Diego Souza 18'; André 41', 80'	Report		Stadium: Estádio Adelmar da Costa Carvalho (Ilha do Retiro); Attendance: 9,748; Referee: Dewson Fernando Freitas da Silva

23 July 2017 16	Sport	0–2	Palmeiras	São Lourenço da Mata
16:00 (UTC-3)		Report	Bruno Henrique 34'; Keno 45+3'	Stadium: Estádio Governador Carlos Wilson Campos (Arena Pernambuco); Attendance: 42,025; Referee: Eduardo Tomaz de Aquino Valadao

30 July 2017 17	Bahia	1–3	Sport	Salvador
16:00 (UTC-3)	Rodrigão 58'	Report	Everton Felipe 18'; Ronaldo Alves 65'; Lenis 90+1'	Stadium: Itaipava Arena Fonte Nova; Attendance: 17,869; Referee: Elmo Alves Resende Cunha

2 August 2017 18	Sport	2–2	Fluminense	Recife
19:30 (UTC-3)	André 32'; Patrick 48'	Report	Gustavo Scarpa 8'; Renato Chaves 13'	Stadium: Estádio Adelmar da Costa Carvalho (Ilha do Retiro); Attendance: 16,918; Referee: Marcelo Aparecido de Souza

5 August 2017 19	Corinthians	3–1	Sport	São Paulo
19:00 (UTC-3)	Guilherme Arana 9'; Rodriguinho 46'; Pedro Henrique 66'	Report	Thallyson 82'	Stadium: Arena Corinthians; Attendance: 41,279; Referee: Wagner Reway

13 August 2017 20	Sport	0–0	Ponte Preta	Recife
16:00 (UTC-3)		Report		Stadium: Estádio Adelmar da Costa Carvalho (Ilha do Retiro); Attendance: 12,967; Referee: Leandro Pedro Vuaden

20 August 2017 21	Cruzeiro	2–0	Sport	Belo Horizonte
16:00 (UTC-3)	Sassá 34'; Raniel 81'	Report		Stadium: Estádio Governador Magalhães (Mineirão); Attendance: 10,393; Referee: Caio Max Augusto Vieira

2 September 2017 22	Grêmio	5–0	Sport	Porto Alegre
16:00 (UTC-3)	Edílson 20'; Everton 34'; Fernandinho 67', 69'; Dionathã 83'	Report		Stadium: Arena do Grêmio; Attendance: 17,518; Referee: Andre Luiz de Freitas Castro

10 September 2017 23	Sport	0–1	Avaí	Recife
16:00 (UTC-3)		Report	Junior Dutra 26'	Stadium: Estádio Adelmar da Costa Carvalho (Ilha do Retiro); Attendance: 9,870; Referee: Wagner do Nascimento Magalhaes

17 September 2017 24	Flamengo	2–0	Sport	Rio de Janeiro
16:00 (UTC-3)	Guerrero 9'; Éverton Ribeiro 90+3'	Report		Stadium: Estádio Luso Brasileiro; Attendance: 9,029; Referee: Vinicius Goncalves Dias Araujo

25 September 2017 25	Sport	1–1	Vasco da Gama	Recife
20:00 (UTC-3)	André 84'	Report	Nenê 38'	Stadium: Estádio Adelmar da Costa Carvalho (Ilha do Retiro); Attendance: 17,190; Referee: Sandro Meira Ricci

1 October 2017 26	São Paulo	1–0	Sport	São Paulo
16:00 (UTC-3)	Marcos Guilherme 36'	Report		Stadium: Estádio Cícero Pompeu de Toledo (Morumbi); Attendance: 43,071; Referee: Anderson Daronco

12 October 2017 27	Vitória	1–2	Sport	Salvador
17:00 (UTC-3)	Tréllez 81'	Report	Diego Souza 45'; Lenis 64'	Stadium: Estádio Manoel Barradas (Barradão); Attendance: 15,638; Referee: Marcelo Aparecido R de Souza

15 October 2017 28	Sport	1–1	Atlético Mineiro	Recife
17:00 (UTC-3)	Patrick 9'	Report	Fred 37'	Stadium: Estádio Adelmar da Costa Carvalho (Ilha do Retiro); Attendance: 20,273; Referee: Leandro Bizzio Marinho

19 October 2017 29	Sport	1–1	Santos	Recife
21:00 (UTC-3)	Rogério 83'	Report	Ricardo Oliveira 3'	Stadium: Estádio Adelmar da Costa Carvalho (Ilha do Retiro); Attendance: 16,377; Referee: Dewson Fernando Freitas da Silva

22 October 2017 30	Atlético Paranaense	2–1	Sport	Curitiba
17:00 (UTC-3)	González 60'; Felipe Gedoz 87'	Report	Diego Souza 69'	Stadium: Estádio Joaquim Américo Guimarães (Arena da Baixada); Attendance: 10,407; Referee: Thiago Duarte Peixoto

29 October 2017 31	Sport	3–4	Coritiba	Recife
18:00 (UTC-3)	Diego Souza 29', 62'; André 42'	Report	Werley 6'; Henrique Almeida 39'; Jonas 78'; Yan Sasse 90'	Stadium: Estádio Adelmar da Costa Carvalho (Ilha do Retiro); Attendance: 9,982; Referee: Leandro Pedro Vuaden

5 November 2017 32	Chapecoense	1–1	Sport	Chapecó
19:00 (UTC-3)	Wellington Paulista 66'	Report	André 90+6'	Stadium: Arena Condá; Attendance: 10,654; Referee: Ricardo Marques Ribeiro

8 November 2017 33	Sport	1–2	Botafogo	Recife
21:00 (UTC-3)	André 85'	Report	Bruno Silva 14'; Marcos Vinícius 18'	Stadium: Estádio Adelmar da Costa Carvalho (Ilha do Retiro); Attendance: 24,119; Referee: Wilton Pereira Sampaio

12 November 2017 34	Atlético Goianiense	2–0	Sport	Goiânia
17:00 (UTC-3)	Diego Rosa 41', 76'	Report		Stadium: Estádio Olímpico Pedro Ludovico; Attendance: 1,107; Referee: Luiz Flavio de Oliveira

16 November 2017 35	Palmeiras	5–1	Sport	São Paulo
20:00 (UTC-3)	Deyverson 57', 79'; Luan Garcia 63'; Dudu 89'; Keno 90+1'	Report	Diego Souza 83'	Stadium: Allianz Parque; Attendance: 18,744; Referee: Rafael Traci

19 November 2017 36	Sport	1–0	Bahia	Recife
17:00 (UTC-3)	Marquinhos 38'	Report		Stadium: Estádio Adelmar da Costa Carvalho (Ilha do Retiro); Attendance: 14,697; Referee: Wagner do Nascimento Magalhaes

25 November 2017 37	Fluminense	1–2	Sport	Rio de Janeiro
17:00 (UTC-3)	Marcos Júnior 37'	Report	André 11', 23'	Stadium: Estádio Jornalista Mário Filho (Maracanã); Attendance: 12,819; Referee: Dewson Fernando Freitas da Silva

3 December 2017 38	Sport	1–0	Corinthians	Recife
17:00 (UTC-3)	André 62'	Report		Stadium: Estádio Adelmar da Costa Carvalho (Ilha do Retiro); Attendance: 29,977; Referee: Ricardo Marques Ribeiro

==== Record ====
Final Position	Points	Matches	Wins	Draws	Losses	Goals For	Goals Away	Win%
15th	45	38	12	9	17	46	58	39%
