= 2016 Sport Club do Recife season =

Sport Recife
2016 season
- Chairman: João Humberto Martorelli
- Manager: Paulo Roberto Falcão; Thiago Gomes (c); Oswaldo de Oliveira; Daniel Paulista
- Stadium: Ilha do Retiro
- Série A: 14th
- Pernambucano: Runners-up
- Copa do Brasil: First round
- Copa do Nordeste: Semi-finals
- Copa Sudamericana: Second stage
- Top goalscorer: League: Diego Souza (14); All: Diego Souza (15)
| Home colours | Away colours | Third colours |

The 2016 season was Sport Recife's 112th season in the club's history. Sport competed in the Campeonato Pernambucano, Copa do Nordeste, Copa Sudamericana, Série A and Copa do Brasil.

== Final squad ==
Note: Flags indicate national team as defined under FIFA eligibility rules; some limited exceptions apply. Players may hold more than one non-FIFA nationality.

| No. | Pos. | Nation | Player |
|---|---|---|---|
| 1 | GK | BRA | Magrão |
| 2 | DF | COL | Oswaldo Henríquez |
| 3 | DF | BRA | Ronaldo Alves |
| 4 | DF | BRA | Durval (captain) |
| 5 | MF | BRA | Rodrigo Mancha |
| 6 | DF | BRA | Renê |
| 7 | MF | COL | Reinaldo Lenis |
| 8 | MF | BRA | Serginho |
| 9 | FW | BRA | Vinícius Araújo (on loan from Valencia) |
| 10 | MF | BRA | Gabriel Xavier (on loan from Cruzeiro) |
| 12 | FW | BRA | Paulo Henrique (on loan from Shanghai Shenhua) |
| 14 | DF | BRA | Luis Gustavo (on loan from Penapolense) |
| 16 | DF | BRA | Matheus Ferraz |
| 17 | FW | BRA | Edmilson |
| 19 | GK | BRA | Agenor |

| No. | Pos. | Nation | Player |
|---|---|---|---|
| 21 | MF | BRA | Rithely |
| 22 | FW | CRC | Rodney Wallace |
| 23 | GK | BRA | Luiz Carlos |
| 25 | MF | BRA | Neto Moura |
| 26 | DF | BRA | Oswaldo |
| 27 | DF | BRA | Samuel Xavier |
| 28 | MF | BRA | Paulo Roberto |
| 29 | MF | BRA | Ronaldo |
| 30 | MF | BRA | Fábio Matos |
| 32 | DF | BRA | Apodi |
| 87 | MF | BRA | Diego Souza |
| 90 | FW | BRA | Rogério (on loan from São Paulo) |
| 93 | DF | BRA | Mansur (on loan from Atlético Mineiro) |
| 97 | MF | BRA | Everton Felipe |
| 99 | FW | BRA | Tulio de Melo |

== Statistics ==
=== Overall ===
| Games played | 66 (14 Pernambucano, 10 Copa do Nordeste, 2 Copa do Brasil, 2 Sudamericana, 38 Série A) |
| Games won | 24 (6 Pernambucano, 5 Copa do Nordeste, 0 Copa do Brasil, 0 Sudamericana, 13 Série A) |
| Games drawn | 14 (3 Pernambucano, 2 Copa do Nordeste, 0 Copa do Brasil, 1 Sudamericana, 8 Série A) |
| Games lost | 28 (5 Pernambucano, 3 Copa do Nordeste, 2 Copa do Brasil, 1 Sudamericana, 17 Série A) |
| Goals scored | 82 |
| Goals conceded | 80 |
| Goal difference | +2 |
| Best results (goal difference) | 5–1 (H) v Chapecoense - Série A - 2016.06.26 |
| Worst result (goal difference) | 0–3 (A) v Botafogo - Série A - 2016.08.20; 0–3 (A) v Corinthians - Série A - 2016.09.08; 0–3 (A) v Chapecoense - Série A - 2016.10.12 |
| Top scorer | Diego Souza (15) |

Source: Sport Recife official website

=== Goalscorers ===
| Place | Pos. | Nat. | No. | Name | Campeonato Pernambucano | Copa do Nordeste | Copa do Brasil | Copa Sudamericana | Série A | Total |
|---|---|---|---|---|---|---|---|---|---|---|
| 1 | FW | (Brazil) | 87 | Diego Souza | 0 | 0 | 1 | 0 | 14 | 15 |
| 2 | FW | (Brazil) | 90 | Rogério | 0 | 0 | 0 | 0 | 8 | 8 |
| 3 | FW | (Brazil) | 99 | Túlio de Melo | 3 | 3 | 0 | 0 | 1 | 7 |
| 4 | FW | (Brazil) | 17 | Edmílson | 0 | 0 | 0 | 0 | 5 | 5 |
| = | MF | (Colombia) | 7 | Reinaldo Lenis | 3 | 2 | 0 | 0 | 0 | 5 |
| = | FW | (Brazil) | 9 | Vinícius Araújo | 2 | 1 | 0 | 0 | 2 | 5 |
| 5 | MF | (Brazil) | 10 | Gabriel Xavier | 1 | 0 | 0 | 0 | 3 | 4 |
| = | MF | (Brazil) | 21 | Rithely | 0 | 2 | 0 | 0 | 2 | 4 |
| = | MF | (Costa Rica) | 22 | Rodney Wallace | 0 | 0 | 0 | 0 | 4 | 4 |
| 6 | DF | (Brazil) | 4 | Durval | 1 | 1 | 0 | 0 | 1 | 3 |
| = | MF | (Brazil) | 97 | Everton Felipe | 0 | 2 | 0 | 0 | 1 | 3 |
| 7 | DF | (Brazil) | 15 | Luiz Antônio | 2 | 0 | 0 | 0 | 0 | 2 |
| = | DF | (Brazil) | 16 | Matheus Ferraz | 0 | 0 | 0 | 0 | 2 | 2 |
| = | DF | (Brazil) | 6 | Renê | 0 | 2 | 0 | 0 | 0 | 2 |
| = | DF | (Brazil) | 3 | Ronaldo Alves | 0 | 0 | 0 | 0 | 2 | 2 |
| = | MF | (Brazil) | 8 | Serginho | 1 | 0 | 0 | 0 | 1 | 2 |
| 8 | MF | (Brazil) | 30 | Fábio Matos | 1 | 0 | 0 | 0 | 0 | 1 |
| = | FW | (Colombia) | 18 | Luis Ruiz | 0 | 0 | 0 | 0 | 1 | 1 |
| = | MF | (Chile) | 11 | Mark González | 0 | 0 | 0 | 0 | 1 | 1 |
| = | MF | (Brazil) | 25 | Neto Moura | 0 | 1 | 0 | 0 | 0 | 1 |
| = | DF | (Colombia) | 2 | Oswaldo Henríquez | 1 | 0 | 0 | 0 | 0 | 1 |
| = | DF | (Brazil) | 27 | Samuel Xavier | 0 | 1 | 0 | 0 | 0 | 1 |
| | | | | Own goals | 2 | 0 | 0 | 0 | 1 | 3 |
| | | | | Total | 17 | 15 | 1 | 0 | 49 | 82 |

=== Managers performance ===
| Name | From | To | P | W | D | L | GF | GA | Avg% | Ref |
|---|---|---|---|---|---|---|---|---|---|---|
| (Brazil) Paulo Roberto Falcão | 24 January 2016 | 17 April 2016 | 21 | 11 | 4 | 6 | 33 | 18 | 58% | |
| (Brazil) Thiago Gomes (c) | 6 April 2016 | 28 April 2016 | 4 | 1 | 0 | 3 | 2 | 5 | 25% | |
| (Brazil) Oswaldo de Oliveira | 4 May 2016 | 12 October 2016 | 32 | 9 | 9 | 14 | 38 | 44 | 37% | |
| (Brazil) Luiz Alberto Da Silva (c) | 4 July 2016 | 8 September 2016 | 2 | 0 | 0 | 2 | 1 | 6 | 0% | |
| (Brazil) Daniel Paulista | 16 October 2016 | 11 December 2016 | 8 | 4 | 1 | 3 | 10 | 7 | 54% | |

(c) Indicates the caretaker manager

=== Home record ===
| Recife | São Lourenço da Mata |
|---|---|
| Ilha do Retiro | Arena Pernambuco |
| Capacity: 32,983 | Capacity: 44,300 |
| 30 matches (17 wins 6 draws 7 losses) | 3 matches (1 win 1 draw 1 loss) |

== Friendlies ==
=== Ariano Suassuna Trophy ===
| 24 January 2016 | Sport (Brazil) | 2–0 | (Argentina) Argentinos Juniors | Recife |
| (UTC-3) | Everton Felipe 7'; Túlio de Melo 12' | Report | | Stadium: Estádio Adelmar da Costa Carvalho (Ilha do Retiro); Attendance: 8,909; Referee: Emerson Sobral |

== Official Competitions ==
=== Campeonato Pernambucano ===
==== First stage ====
| 31 January 2016 1 | Salgueiro | 1–0 | Sport | Salgueiro |
| (UTC-3) | Cássio Ortega 13' | Report | | Stadium: Estádio Cornélio de Barros; Attendance: 3,081; Referee: Gilberto Castro Júnior |

| 3 February 2016 2 | Sport | 0–1 | América | Recife |
| 21:30 (UTC-3) | | Report | Danyel 59' | Stadium: Estádio Adelmar da Costa Carvalho (Ilha do Retiro) |

| 10 February 2016 3 | Central | 1–2 | Sport | Caruaru |
| (UTC-3) | Jorge Wanderson 29' | Report | Lenis 6'; Túlio de Melo 84' | Stadium: Estádio Luiz José de Lacerda |

| 21 February 2016 4 | Sport | 2–1 | Santa Cruz | Recife |
| (UTC-3) | Luiz Antônio 51'; Túlio de Melo 80' | Report | Grafite 9' | Stadium: Estádio Adelmar da Costa Carvalho (Ilha do Retiro); Attendance: 14,609; Referee: Sebastião Rufino Filho |

| 28 February 2016 5 | Sport | 2–0 | Náutico | Recife |
| (UTC-3) | Lenis 35'; Fábio Matos 74' | Report | | Stadium: Estádio Adelmar da Costa Carvalho (Ilha do Retiro); Attendance: 14,504; Referee: Tiago Nascimento dos Santos |

| 6 March 2016 6 | Náutico | 1–1 | Sport | São Lourenço da Mata |
| (UTC-3) | Ronaldo Alves 55' (pen.) | Report | Niel 60' (o.g.) | Stadium: Estádio Governador Carlos Wilson Campos (Arena Pernambuco); Attendance: 7,041; Referee: José Woshington da Silva |

| 12 March 2016 7 | Sport | 4–0 | Central | Recife |
| (UTC-3) | Gabriel Xavier 16'; Luiz Antônio 52'; Lenis 54'; Vinícius Araújo 72' | Report | | Stadium: Estádio Adelmar da Costa Carvalho (Ilha do Retiro); Attendance: 3,239; Referee: Wagner Cabral |

| 19 March 2016 8 | América | 0–4 | Sport | Recife |
| (UTC-3) | | Report | Durval 1'; Túlio de Melo 54'; Henríquez 68'; Serginho 70' | Stadium: Estádio José do Rego Maciel (Arruda); Attendance: 1,497 |

| 27 March 2016 9 | Sport | 0–1 | Salgueiro | Recife |
| (UTC-3) | | Report | Toty 72' | Stadium: Estádio Adelmar da Costa Carvalho (Ilha do Retiro); Attendance: 4,370; Referee: Nielson Nogueira Dias |

| 10 April 2016 10 | Santa Cruz | 1–1 | Sport | Recife |
| (UTC-3) | Keno 33' | Report | Grafite 55' (o.g.) | Stadium: Estádio José do Rego Maciel (Arruda); Attendance: 16,377; Referee: Gleydson Leite |

==== Semi-finals ====
| 21 April 2016 | Sport | 1–0 | Salgueiro | Recife |
| (UTC-3) | Vinícius Araújo 13' | Report | | Stadium: Estádio Adelmar da Costa Carvalho (Ilha do Retiro); Attendance: 16,699; Referee: Tiago Nascimento dos Santos |

| 24 April 2016 | Salgueiro | 1–0 (4–5 p) | Sport | Salgueiro |
| (UTC-3) | Moreilândia 7' | Report | | Stadium: Estádio Cornélio de Barros; Attendance: 4,184; Referee: Gleydson Leite |
| | Penalties |
| | Marcos Tamandaré (penalty missed); Rogério (penalty scored); Nilson (penalty scored); Ranieri (penalty scored); Rodolfo Potiguar (penalty scored); Toty (penalty missed) | | (penalty scored) Durval; (penalty scored) Luiz Antônio; (penalty missed) Gabriel Xavier; (penalty scored) Everton Felipe; (penalty scored) Mark González; (penalty scored) Samuel Xavier |

==== Finals ====
| 4 May 2016 | Santa Cruz | 1–0 | Sport | Recife |
| 21:45 (UTC-3) | Lelê 31' | Report | | Stadium: Estádio José do Rego Maciel (Arruda); Attendance: 30,163; Referee: Emerson Sobral |

| 8 May 2016 | Sport | 0–0 | Santa Cruz | Recife |
| 16:00 (UTC-3) | | Report | | Stadium: Estádio Adelmar da Costa Carvalho (Ilha do Retiro); Referee: Sebastião Rufino Ribeiro Filho |

==== Record ====
| Final Position | Points | Matches | Wins | Draws | Losses | Goals For | Goals Away | Win% |
|---|---|---|---|---|---|---|---|---|
| 2nd | 21 | 14 | 6 | 3 | 5 | 17 | 9 | 50% |

=== Copa do Nordeste ===
==== Group stage ====
| 14 February 2016 1 | Botafogo–PB | 1–2 | Sport | João Pessoa |
| 17:00 (UTC-3) | Muller Araújo 12' | Report | Túlio de Melo 61'; Rithely 80' | Stadium: Estádio José Américo de Almeida Filho (Almeidão); Attendance: 6,790; Referee: Caio Max Augusto Vieira |

| 17 February 2016 2 | Sport | 2–0 | Fortaleza | Recife |
| 22:30 (UTC-3) | Rithely 38'; Túlio de Melo 45+1' | Report | | Stadium: Estádio Adelmar da Costa Carvalho (Ilha do Retiro); Attendance: 7,333; Referee: Leandro Saraiva Dantas de Oliveira |

| 24 February 2016 3 | River | 2–2 | Sport | Teresina |
| 21:45 (UTC-3) | Vanderlei 16', 62' | Report | Everton Felipe 83', 87' | Stadium: Estádio Governador Alberto Tavares Silva (Albertão); Attendance: 5,413; Referee: Ranilton Oliveira de Sousa |

| 3 March 2016 4 | Sport | 2–2 | River | Recife |
| 19:00 (UTC-3) | Neto Moura 34'; Lenis 67' | Report | André Beleza 1'; Paulo Paraíba 90+3' | Stadium: Estádio Adelmar da Costa Carvalho (Ilha do Retiro); Attendance: 6,945; Referee: Gleidson Santos Oliveira |

| 9 March 2016 5 | Fortaleza | 2–1 | Sport | Fortaleza |
| 21:45 (UTC-3) | Anselmo 3'; Jean Mota 32' | Report | Túlio de Melo 45+2' | Stadium: Estádio Governador Plácido Castelo (Castelão); Attendance: 13,702; Referee: Ranilton Oliveira de Sousa |

| 23 March 2016 6 | Sport | 3–1 | Botafogo–PB | Recife |
| 21:45 (UTC-3) | Renê 33'; Vinícius Araújo 66'; Samuel Xavier 75' | Report | Carlinhos Júnior 38' | Stadium: Estádio Adelmar da Costa Carvalho (Ilha do Retiro); Attendance: 5,841; Referee: Cláudio Francisco Lima e Silva |

==== Quarter-finals ====
| 30 March 2016 | CRB | 2–1 | Sport | Maceió |
| 21:45 (UTC-3) | Lúcio Maranhão 11'; Somália 68' | Report | Lenis 31' | Stadium: Estádio Rei Pelé; Attendance: 7,239; Referee: Pablo Ramón Goncalves Pinheiro |

| 2 April 2016 | Sport | 1–0 (a) | CRB | Recife |
| 18:00 (UTC-3) | Renê 73' | Report | | Stadium: Estádio Adelmar da Costa Carvalho (Ilha do Retiro); Attendance: 21,446; Referee: Luiz César de Oliveira Magalhães |

==== Semi-finals ====
| 14 April 2016 | Sport | 1–0 | Campinense | Recife |
| 20:00 (UTC-3) | Durval 90+4' | Report | | Stadium: Estádio Adelmar da Costa Carvalho (Ilha do Retiro); Attendance: 23,390; Referee: José Ricardo Vasconcellos Laranjeira |

| 17 April 2016 | Campinense | 1–0 (3–1 p) | Sport | Campina Grande |
| 16:00 (UTC-3) | Rodrigão 61' | Report | | Stadium: Estádio Governador Ernani Sátyro (Amigão); Attendance: 8,572; Referee: Charles Hebert Cavalcante Ferreira |
| | Penalties |
| | Chapinha (penalty scored); Jussimar (penalty scored); Tiago Sala (penalty missed); Joecio (penalty scored) | | (penalty scored) Diego Souza; (penalty missed) Renê; (penalty missed) Luiz Antônio; (penalty missed) Johnathan Goiano |

==== Record ====
| Final Position | Points | Matches | Wins | Draws | Losses | Goals For | Goals Away | Win% |
|---|---|---|---|---|---|---|---|---|
| 4th | 17 | 10 | 5 | 2 | 3 | 15 | 11 | 56% |

=== Copa do Brasil ===
==== First round ====
| 6 April 2016 | Aparecidense | 2–0 | Sport | Aparecida de Goiânia |
| 19:30 (UTC-3) | Robert 62'; Filipe Costa 89' | Report | | Stadium: Estádio Annibal Batista de Toledo; Attendance: 636; Referee: Emerson de Almeida Ferreira |

| 28 April 2016 | Sport | 1–2 | Aparecidense | Recife |
| 19:15 (UTC-3) | Diego Souza 35' | Report | Mateus 19'; Clayton 62' | Stadium: Estádio Adelmar da Costa Carvalho (Ilha do Retiro); Attendance: 1,599; Referee: Pablo Ramón Goncalves Pinheiro |

==== Record ====
| Final Position | Points | Matches | Wins | Draws | Losses | Goals For | Goals Away | Win% |
|---|---|---|---|---|---|---|---|---|
| 82nd | 0 | 2 | 0 | 0 | 2 | 1 | 4 | 0% |

=== Copa Sudamericana ===
==== Second stage ====
| 24 August 2016 | Santa Cruz (Brazil) | 0–0 | (Brazil) Sport | São Lourenço da Mata |
| 21:45 (UTC-3) | | Report | | Stadium: Estádio Governador Carlos Wilson Campos (Arena Pernambuco); Attendance: 5,517; Referee: Julio Bascuñan (Chile) |

| 31 August 2016 | Sport (Brazil) | 0–1 | (Brazil) Santa Cruz | São Lourenço da Mata |
| 21:45 (UTC-3) | | Report | Bruno Moraes 82' | Stadium: Estádio Governador Carlos Wilson Campos (Arena Pernambuco); Attendance: 6,750; Referee: Diego Haro (Peru) |

==== Record ====
| Final Position | Points | Matches | Wins | Draws | Losses | Goals For | Goals Away | Win% |
|---|---|---|---|---|---|---|---|---|
| 30th | 1 | 2 | 0 | 1 | 1 | 0 | 1 | 16% |

=== Série A ===
==== Matches ====
| 14 May 2016 1 | Flamengo | 1–0 | Sport | Volta Redonda |
| 16:00 (UTC-3) | Everton 5' | Report | | Stadium: Estádio Municipal General Sylvio (Raulino de Oliveira); Attendance: 9,382; Referee: Marcelo Aparecido R de Souza |

| 22 May 2016 2 | Sport | 1–1 | Botafogo | Recife |
| 18:30 (UTC-3) | Diego Souza 17' | Report | Fernandes 29' | Stadium: Estádio Adelmar da Costa Carvalho (Ilha do Retiro); Attendance: 6,117; Referee: Vinícius Furlan |

| 26 May 2016 3 | Internacional | 1–0 | Sport | Porto Alegre |
| 16:00 (UTC-3) | Renê 58' (o.g.) | Report | | Stadium: Estádio José Pinheiro Borda (Beira-Rio); Attendance: 24,840; Referee: Igor Junio Benevenuto |

| 29 May 2016 4 | Sport | 0–2 | Corinthians | Recife |
| 11:00 (UTC-3) | | Report | Lucca 70'; Marquinhos Gabriel 79' | Stadium: Estádio Adelmar da Costa Carvalho (Ilha do Retiro); Attendance: 14,645; Referee: Wagner Reway |

| 1 June 2016 5 | Santa Cruz | 0–1 | Sport | Recife |
| 21:00 (UTC-3) | | Report | Edmílson 9' | Stadium: Estádio José do Rego Maciel (Arruda); Attendance: 16,951; Referee: Raphael Claus |

| 5 June 2016 6 | Sport | 4–4 | Atlético Mineiro | Recife |
| 16:00 (UTC-3) | Rithely 26'; Gabriel Xavier 45'; Edmílson 73'; Diego Souza 76' | Report | Júnior Urso 22'; Robinho 30' (pen.), 45+3' (pen.); Patric 42' | Stadium: Estádio Adelmar da Costa Carvalho (Ilha do Retiro); Attendance: 14,170; Referee: Rodrigo Nunes de Sá |

| 12 June 2016 7 | Coritiba | 3–2 | Sport | Curitiba |
| 11:00 (UTC-3) | Ruy 37'; Kléber 48'; Luccas Claro 70' | Report | Diego Souza 25', 52' | Stadium: Estádio Major Antônio (Couto Pereira); Attendance: 8,221; Referee: Braulio da Silva Machado |

| 15 June 2016 8 | Santos | 2–0 | Sport | Santos |
| 21:00 (UTC-3) | Gabriel Barbosa 66'; Vitor Bueno 88' | Report | | Stadium: Estádio Urbano Caldeira (Vila Belmiro); Attendance: 4,937; Referee: Leandro Pedro Vuaden |

| 19 June 2016 9 | Sport | 2–1 | Fluminense | Recife |
| 16:00 (UTC-3) | Gabriel Xavier 40'; Diego Souza 90' | Report | Magno Alves 85' | Stadium: Estádio Adelmar da Costa Carvalho (Ilha do Retiro); Attendance: 8,065; Referee: Raphael Claus |

| 23 June 2016 10 | São Paulo | 0–0 | Sport | São Paulo |
| 21:00 (UTC-3) | | Report | | Stadium: Estádio Cícero Pompeu de Toledo (Morumbi); Attendance: 11,145; Referee: Rafael Traci |

| 26 June 2016 11 | Sport | 5–1 | Chapecoense | Recife |
| 18:30 (UTC-3) | Rodney Wallace 10', 57'; Rithely 54'; Diego Souza 64'; Ronaldo Alves 77' | Report | Ananias 46' | Stadium: Estádio Adelmar da Costa Carvalho (Ilha do Retiro); Attendance: 8,743; Referee: Dewson Fernando Freitas da Silva |

| 29 June 2016 12 | Vitória | 3–2 | Sport | Salvador |
| 19:30 (UTC-3) | Vander 45'; Euller 61'; Nickson 64' | Report | Matheus Ferraz 18', 78' | Stadium: Estádio Manoel Barradas (Barradão); Attendance: 5,840; Referee: Leonardo Garcia Cavaleiro |

| 4 July 2016 13 | Sport | 1–3 | Palmeiras | Recife |
| 20:00 (UTC-3) | Gabriel Xavier 59' | Report | Erik 11'; Gabriel Jesus 66'; Cleiton Xavier 72' (pen.) | Stadium: Estádio Adelmar da Costa Carvalho (Ilha do Retiro); Attendance: 26,719; Referee: Anderson Daronco |

| 9 July 2016 14 | Ponte Preta | 2–1 | Sport | Campinas |
| 21:00 (UTC-3) | William Pottker 17'; Douglas Grolli 79' | Report | Rogério 10' | Stadium: Estádio Moisés Lucarelli; Attendance: 3,086; Referee: Héber Roberto Lopes |

| 17 July 2016 15 | Sport | 4–2 | Grêmio | Recife |
| 18:30 (UTC-3) | Serginho 22'; Diego Souza 39', 75' (pen.); Edmílson 68' | Report | Pedro Geromel 46', 63' | Stadium: Estádio Adelmar da Costa Carvalho (Ilha do Retiro); Attendance: 10,891; Referee: Rodrigo Batista Raposo |

| 24 July 2016 16 | Cruzeiro | 1–2 | Sport | Belo Horizonte |
| 16:00 (UTC-3) | Willian 90+2' | Report | Rogério 38', 51' | Stadium: Estádio Governador Magalhães Pinto (Mineirão); Attendance: 18,861; Referee: Leandro Pedro Vuaden |

| 30 July 2016 17 | Sport | 2–0 | Atlético Paranaense | Recife |
| 18:30 (UTC-3) | Diego Souza 17' (pen.); Edmílson 53' | Report | | Stadium: Estádio Adelmar da Costa Carvalho (Ilha do Retiro); Attendance: 22,491; Referee: Wilton Pereira Sampaio |

| 3 August 2016 18 | Sport | 1–1 | América Mineiro | Recife |
| 19:30 (UTC-3) | González 90+3' | Report | Danilo Barcelos 40' | Stadium: Estádio Adelmar da Costa Carvalho (Ilha do Retiro); Attendance: 20,987; Referee: Héber Roberto Lopes |

| 7 August 2016 19 | Figueirense | 1–1 | Sport | Florianópolis |
| 18:30 (UTC-3) | Carlos Alberto 46' | Report | Túlio de Melo 82' (pen.) | Stadium: Estádio Orlando Scarpelli; Attendance: 5,075; Referee: Flávio Rodrigues de Souza |

| 13 August 2016 20 | Sport | 1–0 | Flamengo | São Lourenço da Mata |
| 16:00 (UTC-3) | Edmílson 24' | Report | | Stadium: Estádio Governador Carlos Wilson Campos (Arena Pernambuco); Attendance: 25,019; Referee: Rodolpho Toski Marques |

| 20 August 2016 21 | Botafogo | 3–0 | Sport | Juiz de Fora |
| 21:00 (UTC-3) | Sassá 45+2', 52'; Camilo 90+2' | Report | | Stadium: Estádio Municipal Radialista Mário Helênio; Attendance: 4,771; Referee: Jean Pierre Goncalves Lima |

| 28 August 2016 22 | Sport | 1–1 | Internacional | São Lourenço da Mata |
| (UTC-3) | Vinícius Araújo 89' | [cbf.com.br/futebol-brasileiro/competicoes/campeonato-brasileiro-serie-a/2016/219?ref=linha Report] | Seijas 9' (pen.) | Stadium: Estádio Governador Carlos Wilson Campos (Arena Pernambuco); Attendance: 7,491; Referee: Grazianni Maciel Rocha |

| 8 September 2016 23 | Corinthians | 3–0 | Sport | São Paulo |
| 19:30 (UTC-3) | Rodriguinho 47'; Léo Príncipe 54'; Vilson 62' | Report | | Stadium: Arena Corinthians; Attendance: 24,360; Referee: João Batista de Arruda |

| 11 September 2016 24 | Sport | 5–3 | Santa Cruz | Recife |
| 16:00 (UTC-3) | Durval 53'; Rodney Wallace 70'; Ruiz 80'; Vinícius Araújo 90'; Everton Felipe 90+2' | Report | Keno 6'; João Paulo 50'; Bruno Moraes 72' | Stadium: Estádio Adelmar da Costa Carvalho (Ilha do Retiro); Attendance: 11,688; Referee: Leandro Pedro Vuaden |

| 15 September 2016 25 | Atlético Mineiro | 1–0 | Sport | Belo Horizonte |
| 19:30 (UTC-3) | Júnior Urso 59' | Report | | Stadium: Estádio Raimundo Sampaio (Independência); Attendance: 11,389; Referee: Thiago Duarte Peixoto |

| 18 September 2016 26 | Sport | 0–1 | Coritiba | Recife |
| 16:00 (UTC-3) | | Report | Amaral 31' | Stadium: Estádio Adelmar da Costa Carvalho (Ilha do Retiro); Attendance: 6,455; Referee: Marielson Alves Silva |

| 24 September 2016 27 | Sport | 1–0 | Santos | Recife |
| 18:30 (UTC-3) | Rogério 11' | Report | | Stadium: Estádio Adelmar da Costa Carvalho (Ilha do Retiro); Attendance: 6,929; Referee: Elmo Alves Resende Cunha |

| 1 October 2016 28 | Fluminense | 3–1 | Sport | Mesquita |
| 11:00 (UTC-3) | Marcos Júnior 54'; Richarlison 66'; Gustavo Scarpa 87' | Report | Gum 11' (o.g.) | Stadium: Estádio Giulite Coutinho; Attendance: 9,008; Referee: Leandro Pedro Vuaden |

| 5 October 2016 29 | Sport | 1–1 | São Paulo | Recife |
| 21:45 (UTC-3) | Diego Souza 43' | Report | Thiago Mendes 25' | Stadium: Estádio Adelmar da Costa Carvalho (Ilha do Retiro); Attendance: 10,301; Referee: Rafael Traci |

| `12 October 2016 30 | Chapecoense | 3–0 | Sport | Chapecó |
| 11:00 (UTC-3) | Thiego 44'; Ananias 57'; Kempes 90' | Report | | Stadium: Arena Condá; Attendance: 6,104; Referee: Marcelo Aparecido R de Souza |

| 16 October 2016 31 | Sport | 1–0 | Vitória | Recife |
| 19:30 (UTC-3) | Diego Souza 6' | Report | | Stadium: Estádio Adelmar da Costa Carvalho (Ilha do Retiro); Attendance: 12,235; Referee: André Luiz de Freitas Castro |

| 23 October 2016 32 | Palmeiras | 2–1 | Sport | São Paulo |
| 17:00 (UTC-3) | Dudu 21'; Tchê Tchê 45+1' | Report | Rogério 32' | Stadium: Allianz Parque; Attendance: 31,107; Referee: Ricardo Marques Ribeiro |

| 27 October 2016 33 | Sport | 1–0 | Ponte Preta | Recife |
| 20:30 (UTC-3) | Rogério 54' | Report | | Stadium: Estádio Adelmar da Costa Carvalho (Ilha do Retiro); Attendance: 11,613; Referee: Jailson Macedo Freitas |

| 7 November 2016 34 | Grêmio | 0–3 | Sport | Porto Alegre |
| 20:00 (UTC-3) | | Report | Diego Souza 45', 90'; Rogério 47' | Stadium: Arena do Grêmio; Attendance: 10,845; Referee: Dewson Fernando Freitas da Silva |

| 16 November 2016 35 | Sport | 0–1 | Cruzeiro | Recife |
| 21:45 (UTC-3) | | Report | Henrique 43' | Stadium: Estádio Adelmar da Costa Carvalho (Ilha do Retiro); Attendance: 10,458; Referee: Thiago Duarte Peixoto |

| 20 November 2016 36 | Atlético Paranaense | 2–0 | Sport | Curitiba |
| 17:00 (UTC-3) | André Lima 22'; Thiago Heleno 35' | Report | | Stadium: Estádio Joaquim Américo Guimarães (Arena da Baixada); Attendance: 21,576; Referee: Dewson Fernando Freitas da Silva |

| 26 November 2016 37 | América Mineiro | 2–2 | Sport | Belo Horizonte |
| 20:00 (UTC-3) | Danilo Barcelos 53'; Michael 64' | Report | Rodney Wallace 12'; Ronaldo Alves 80' | Stadium: Estádio Raimundo Sampaio (Independência); Attendance: 2,139; Referee: João Batista de Arruda |

| 11 December 2016 38 | Sport | 2–0 | Figueirense | Recife |
| 17:00 (UTC-3) | Rogério 47'; Diego Souza 89' | Report | | Stadium: Estádio Adelmar da Costa Carvalho (Ilha do Retiro); Attendance: 9,033; Referee: Wagner do Nascimento Magalhães |

==== Record ====
| Final Position | Points | Matches | Wins | Draws | Losses | Goals For | Goals Away | Win% |
|---|---|---|---|---|---|---|---|---|
| 14th | 47 | 38 | 13 | 8 | 17 | 49 | 55 | 41% |
