= 2017 Copa do Nordeste =

Tournament details
- Country: Brazil
- Dates: 24 January – 24 May
- Teams: 20

Final positions
- Champions: Bahia
- Runners-up: Sport
- 2018 Copa do Brasil: Bahia

Tournament statistics
- Matches played: 74
- Goals scored: 183 (2.47 per match)
- Top goal scorer: Régis (6 goals)

Awards
- Best player: Régis

The 2017 Copa do Nordeste was the 14th edition of the main football tournament featuring teams from the Brazilian Northeast Region. The competition featured 20 clubs, with Bahia and Pernambuco having three seeds each, and Ceará, Rio Grande do Norte, Sergipe, Alagoas, Paraíba, Maranhão and Piauí with two seeds each.

Bahia defeated Sport 2–1 on aggregate to win their third Copa do Nordeste title. After the format changes implemented by CONMEBOL, Bahia did not qualify to Copa Sudamericana. Instead, they had a berth in the Round of 16 of the 2018 Copa do Brasil.

Santa Cruz were the defending champions, but were eliminated by Sport in the semi-finals.

== Qualified teams ==
Association	Team (Berth)	Entry stage
(Alagoas) Alagoas; 2 berths	CRB	2016 Campeonato Alagoano champions
(Alagoas) Alagoas; 2 berths	CSA	2016 Campeonato Alagoano runners-up
(Bahia) Bahia; 3 berths	Vitória	2016 Campeonato Baiano champions
(Bahia) Bahia; 3 berths	Bahia	2016 Campeonato Baiano runners-up
(Bahia) Bahia; 3 berths	Juazeirense	2016 Campeonato Baiano 3rd place
(Ceará) Ceará; 2 berths	Fortaleza	2016 Campeonato Cearense champions
(Ceará) Ceará; 2 berths	Uniclinic	2016 Campeonato Cearense runners-up
(Maranhão) Maranhão; 2 berths	Moto Club	2016 Campeonato Maranhense champions
(Maranhão) Maranhão; 2 berths	Sampaio Corrêa	2016 Campeonato Maranhense runners-up
(Paraíba) Paraíba; 2 berths	Campinense	2016 Campeonato Paraibano champions
(Paraíba) Paraíba; 2 berths	Botafogo-PB	2016 Campeonato Paraibano runners-up
(Pernambuco) Pernambuco; 3 berths	Santa Cruz	2016 Campeonato Pernambucano champions
(Pernambuco) Pernambuco; 3 berths	Sport	2016 Campeonato Pernambucano runners-up
(Pernambuco) Pernambuco; 3 berths	Náutico	2016 Campeonato Pernambucano 3rd place
(Piauí) Piauí; 2 berths	Ríver	2016 Campeonato Piauiense champions
(Piauí) Piauí; 2 berths	Altos	2016 Campeonato Piauiense runners-up
(Rio Grande do Norte) Rio Grande do Norte; 2 berths	ABC	2016 Campeonato Potiguar champions
(Rio Grande do Norte) Rio Grande do Norte; 2 berths	América de Natal	2016 Campeonato Potiguar runners-up
(Sergipe) Sergipe; 2 berths	Sergipe	2016 Campeonato Sergipano champions
(Sergipe) Sergipe; 2 berths	Itabaiana	2016 Campeonato Sergipano runners-up

== Format ==
- In the Group stage, each group was played on a home-and-away round-robin basis. The winners and the top three runners-up of each group advanced to the Quarter-finals.
- In the final stages, the 8 teams played a single-elimination tournament. Each tie was played on a home-and-away two-legged basis, with the best tournament team hosting the second leg. If tied on aggregate, the away goals rule would be used. If still tied, extra time would not be played, and the penalty shoot-out would be used to determine the winner.

=== Tiebreakers ===
The teams were ranked according to points (3 points for a win, 1 point for a draw, 0 points for a loss).

- To select the top four group winners and the top three runners-up.

If two or more teams were equal on points, the following criteria were applied to determine the rankings:

1. Higher number of wins;
2. Superior goal difference;
3. Higher number of goals scored;
4. Draw in the headquarters of the Brazilian Football Confederation.
- To rank same group teams.

If two or more teams were equal on points on completion of the group matches, the following criteria were applied to determine the rankings:

1. Higher number of wins;
2. Superior goal difference;
3. Higher number of goals scored;
4. Head-to-head result between tied teams (only applicable for a 2 teams tiebreak). If tied on aggregate, the away goals rule would be used unless the teams play in the same stadium;
5. Fewest red cards received;
6. Fewest yellow cards received;
7. Draw in the headquarters of the Brazilian Football Confederation.
- To select Semi-finals and Final second leg host team

If two or more teams were equal on points, the following criteria were applied to determine the host team:

1. Higher number of wins in the tournament;
2. Superior goal difference in the tournament;
3. Draw in the headquarters of the Brazilian Football Confederation.

== Group stage ==
=== Group A ===
Pos	Team	Pld	W	D	L	GF	GA	GD	Pts	Qualification	SAN	CAM	NAU	UNI
1	(Pernambuco) Santa Cruz	6	4	1	1	9	2	+7	13	Knockout phase		1–0	1–0	4–0
2	(Paraíba) Campinense	6	3	2	1	8	2	+6	11	Knockout phase	1–1		2–0	4–0
3	(Pernambuco) Náutico	6	3	1	2	14	3	+11	10		1–0	0–0		4–0
4	(Ceará) Uniclinic	6	0	0	6	0	24	−24	0		0–2	0–1	0–9	

Source: CBF and CBF

=== Group B ===
Pos	Team	Pld	W	D	L	GF	GA	GD	Pts	Qualification	BAH	FOR	ALT	MOT
1	Bahia	6	4	2	0	11	0	+11	14	Knockout phase		2–0	3–0	2–0
2	(Ceará) Fortaleza	6	1	4	1	6	7	−1	7		0–0		1–1	3–2
3	(Piauí) Altos	6	1	4	1	7	9	−2	7		0–0	1–1		4–3
4	(Maranhão) Moto Club	6	0	2	4	7	15	−8	2		0–4	1–1	1–1	

Source: CBF and CBF

=== Group C ===
Pos	Team	Pld	W	D	L	GF	GA	GD	Pts	Qualification	SPO	RIV	SAM	JUA
1	(Pernambuco) Sport	6	4	1	1	12	5	+7	13	Knockout phase		2–2	1–0	5–0
2	(Piauí) Ríver	6	4	1	1	8	4	+4	13	Knockout phase	1–2		1–0	2–0
3	(Maranhão) Sampaio Corrêa	6	2	0	4	4	8	−4	6		2–1	0–1		2–1
4	(Bahia) Juazeirense	6	1	0	5	4	11	−7	3		0–1	0–1	3–0	

Source: CBF and CBF

=== Group D ===
Pos	Team	Pld	W	D	L	GF	GA	GD	Pts	Qualification	ITA	CRB	ABC	CSA
1	(Sergipe) Itabaiana	6	3	2	1	6	6	0	11	Knockout phase		0–0	2–1	2–1
2	(Alagoas) CRB	6	2	3	1	4	2	+2	9		0–0		2–0	2–1
3	(Rio Grande do Norte) ABC	6	2	1	3	6	8	−2	7		3–0	0–0		2–1
4	(Alagoas) CSA	6	2	0	4	8	8	0	6		1–2	1–0	3–0	

Source: CBF and CBF

=== Group E ===
Pos	Team	Pld	W	D	L	GF	GA	GD	Pts	Qualification	VIT	SER	AME	BOT
1	(Bahia) Vitória	6	4	1	1	10	7	+3	13	Knockout phase		3–1	2–1	1–0
2	Sergipe	6	3	1	2	9	7	+2	10	Knockout phase	1–2		1–0	2–0
3	(Rio Grande do Norte) América de Natal	6	2	1	3	5	6	−1	7		0–0	0–2		3–1
4	(Paraíba) Botafogo-PB	6	1	1	4	7	11	−4	4		4–2	2–2	0–1	

Source: CBF and CBF

=== Top three runners-up ===
Pos	Grp	Team	Pld	W	D	L	GF	GA	GD	Pts	Qualification
1	C	(Piauí) Ríver	6	4	1	1	8	4	+4	13	Knockout phase
2	A	(Paraíba) Campinense	6	3	2	1	8	2	+6	11	Knockout phase
3	E	Sergipe	6	3	1	2	9	7	+2	10	Knockout phase
4	D	(Alagoas) CRB	6	2	3	1	4	2	+2	9	
5	B	(Ceará) Fortaleza	6	1	4	1	6	7	−1	7	

Source: CBF

== Knockout phase ==
A draw by CBF was held on March 24 to set the matches for the Quarter-finals. The 8 qualified teams were divided in two pots (1-2). Teams from pot 1 were the top four group winners. Pot 2 was composed of the other group winner and the top three runners-up.

=== Seeding ===
Pos	Grp	Team	Pld	W	D	L	GF	GA	GD	Pts	Qualification
1	B	Bahia	6	4	2	0	11	0	+11	14	Pot 1
2	C	(Pernambuco) Sport	6	4	1	1	12	5	+7	13	Pot 1
3	A	(Pernambuco) Santa Cruz	6	4	1	1	9	2	+7	13	Pot 1
4	E	(Bahia) Vitória	6	4	1	1	10	7	+3	13	Pot 1
5	D	(Sergipe) Itabaiana	6	3	2	1	6	6	0	11	Pot 2
6	C	(Piauí) Ríver	6	4	1	1	8	4	+4	13	Pot 2
7	A	(Paraíba) Campinense	6	3	2	1	8	2	+6	11	Pot 2
8	E	Sergipe	6	3	1	2	9	7	+2	10	Pot 2

Source: CBF

Pot 1	Pot 2
Bahia; (Pernambuco) Sport; (Pernambuco) Santa Cruz; (Bahia) Vitória	(Sergipe) Itabaiana; (Piauí) Ríver; (Paraíba) Campinense; Sergipe

=== Bracket ===
Quarter-finals
(Paraíba) Campinense	3	1	4 (2)
(Pernambuco) Sport (p)	1	3	4 (4)
(Sergipe) Itabaiana	0	0	0
(Pernambuco) Santa Cruz	1	1	2
(Piauí) Ríver	2	0	2
(Bahia) Vitória	3	1	4
Sergipe	2	0	2
Bahia	4	3	7

Semi-finals
(Pernambuco) Sport	1	2	3
(Pernambuco) Santa Cruz	2	0	2
(Bahia) Vitória	2	0	2
Bahia	1	2	3

Final
(Pernambuco) Sport	1	0	1
Bahia	1	1	2

=== Quarter-finals ===
The first legs were played on 29 and 30 March, and the second legs were played on 1 and 2 April 2017.

Team 1	Agg.	Team 2	1st leg	2nd leg
Campinense (Paraíba)	4–4 (2–4 p)	(Pernambuco) Sport	3–1	1–3
Itabaiana (Sergipe)	0–2	(Pernambuco) Santa Cruz	0–1	0–1
Ríver (Piauí)	2–4	(Bahia) Vitória	2–3	0–1
Sergipe	2–7	Bahia	2–4	0–3

==== Matches ====
30 March 2017
21:15

Campinense (Paraíba)	3–1	(Pernambuco) Sport
Magno 28'; Augusto 29'; Reinaldo Alagoano 83'	Report	Juninho 81'

Amigão, Campina Grande
Attendance: 6,949
Referee: Dênis da Silva Ribeiro Serafim (Alagoas)

2 April 2017
16:00

Sport (Pernambuco)	3–1	(Paraíba) Campinense
Rogério 4'; Diego Souza 17', 59'	Report	Fernando Pires 48'
Penalties
Ronaldo Alves (penalty scored); Everton Felipe (penalty scored); Lenis (penalty scored); Fabrício (penalty scored)	4–2	(penalty scored) Osvaldir; (penalty scored) Reinaldo Alagoano; (penalty missed) Tiago Orobó; (penalty missed) Joécio

Estádio Ilha do Retiro, Recife
Attendance: 19,308
Referee: Antônio Dib Moraes de Sousa (Piauí)

Tied 4–4 on aggregate, Sport won on penalties and advanced to the semi-finals.

29 March 2017
21:45

Itabaiana (Sergipe)	0–1	(Pernambuco) Santa Cruz
	Report	Anderson Salles 20'

Estádio Etelvino Mendonça, Itabaiana
Attendance: 3,648
Referee: Marielson Alves Silva (Bahia)

1 April 2017
18:15

Santa Cruz (Pernambuco)	1–0	(Sergipe) Itabaiana
Anderson Salles 72'	Report

Estádio do Arruda, Recife
Attendance: 21,101
Referee: Jailson Macêdo Freitas (Bahia)

Santa Cruz won 2–0 on aggregate and advanced to the semi-finals.

29 March 2017
19:15

Ríver (Piauí)	2–3	(Bahia) Vitória
Brizuela 6'; Negueba 80'	Report	Kieza 2'; Alan Costa 55'; David 77'

Lindolfinho, Teresina
Attendance: 4,885
Referee: Caio Max Augusto Vieira (Rio Grande do Norte)

1 April 2017
16:00

Vitória (Bahia)	1–0	(Piauí) Ríver
José Welison 73'	Report

Barradão, Salvador
Attendance: 9,189
Referee: Péricles Bassols Pegado Cortez (Pernambuco)

Vitória won 4–2 on aggregate and advanced to the semi-finals.

29 March 2017
21:45

Sergipe	2–4	Bahia
Élton 25'; Fabiano 89'	Report	Hernane 28' (pen.); Zé Rafael 60'; Matheus Reis 62'; Régis 76'

Batistão, Aracaju
Attendance: 7,610
Referee: Renan Roberto de Souza (Paraíba)

2 April 2017
18:30

Bahia	3–0	Sergipe
Edson 52', 62'; Edigar Junio 82'	Report

Arena Fonte Nova, Salvador
Attendance: 8,299
Referee: Luiz César de Oliveira Magalhães (Ceará)

Bahia won 7–2 on aggregate and advanced to the semi-finals.

=== Semi-finals ===
==== Host team ====
Pos	Team	Pld	W	D	L	GF	GA	GD	Pts	Host
2	(Pernambuco) Santa Cruz	8	6	1	1	11	2	+9	19	2nd leg
4	(Pernambuco) Sport	8	5	1	2	16	9	+7	16	1st leg
1	Bahia	8	6	2	0	18	2	+16	20	2nd leg
3	(Bahia) Vitória	8	6	1	1	14	9	+5	19	1st leg

Source: CBF

==== Summary ====
The first legs were played on 27 and 29 April, and the second legs were played on 30 April and 3 May 2017.

Team 1	Agg.	Team 2	1st leg	2nd leg
Sport (Pernambuco)	3–2	(Pernambuco) Santa Cruz	1–2	2–0
Vitória (Bahia)	2–3	Bahia	2–1	0–2

==== Matches ====
29 April 2017
18:30

Sport (Pernambuco)	1–2	(Pernambuco) Santa Cruz
Diego Souza 39' (pen.)	Report	Léo Costa 32'; Halef Pitbull 76'

Estádio Ilha do Retiro, Recife
Attendance: 23,574
Referee: Cláudio Francisco Lima e Silva (Sergipe)

3 May 2017
21:45

Santa Cruz (Pernambuco)	0–2	(Pernambuco) Sport
	Report	Everton Felipe 16'; André 77'

Estádio do Arruda, Recife
Attendance: 35,231
Referee: Péricles Bassols Pegado Cortez (Pernambuco)

Sport won 3–2 on aggregate and advanced to the final.

27 April 2017
20:30

Vitória (Bahia)	2–1	Bahia
Euller 37'; André Lima 51'	Report	Edson 4'

Barradão, Salvador
Attendance: 13,686
Referee: Caio Max Augusto Vieira (Rio Grande do Norte)

30 April 2017
16:00

Bahia	2–0	(Bahia) Vitória
Allione 37'; Régis 59'	Report

Arena Fonte Nova, Salvador
Attendance: 34,599
Referee: Luiz César de Oliveira Magalhães (Ceará)

Bahia won 3–2 on aggregate and advanced to the final.

=== Final ===
==== Host team ====
Pos	Team	Pld	W	D	L	GF	GA	GD	Pts	Host
1	Bahia	10	7	2	1	21	4	+17	23	2nd leg
2	(Pernambuco) Sport	10	6	1	3	19	11	+8	19	1st leg

Source: CBF

==== Summary ====
Team 1	Agg.	Team 2	1st leg	2nd leg
Sport (Pernambuco)	1–2	Bahia	1–1	0–1

==== Matches ====
17 May 2017
21:45

Sport (Pernambuco)	1–1	Bahia
Juninho 80'	Report	Juninho 56'

Estádio Ilha do Retiro, Recife
Attendance: 26,685
Referee: Antônio Dib Moraes de Sousa (Piauí)

24 May 2017
21:45

Bahia	1–0	(Pernambuco) Sport
Edigar Junio 12'	Report

Arena Fonte Nova, Salvador
Attendance: 41,175
Referee: Francisco Carlos do Nascimento (Alagoas)

2017 Copa do Nordeste
Champions

Bahia
3rd title

== Top scorers ==
Rank	Player	Club	Goals
1	(Brazil) Régis	Bahia	6
2	(Brazil) Hernane	Bahia	5
2	(Brazil) Hiago	Sergipe	5
4	(Brazil) André	(Pernambuco) Sport	4
4	(Brazil) Diego Souza	(Pernambuco) Sport	4
4	(Brazil) Giva	(Pernambuco) Náutico	4
4	(Brazil) Halef Pitbull	(Pernambuco) Santa Cruz	4
4	(Brazil) Kieza	(Bahia) Vitória	4
4	(Brazil) Rogério	(Pernambuco) Sport	4
4	(Brazil) Viola	(Piauí) River	4

Source: CBF

== 2017 Copa do Nordeste team ==
The 2017 Copa do Nordeste team was a squad consisting of the eleven most impressive players at the tournament.

Pos.	Player	Team
GK	(Brazil) Magrão	(Pernambuco) Sport
DF	(Brazil) Eduardo	Bahia
DF	(Brazil) Anderson Salles	(Pernambuco) Santa Cruz
DF	(Brazil) Tiago	Bahia
DF	(Colombia) Pablo Armero	Bahia
MF	(Brazil) Rithely	(Pernambuco) Sport
MF	(Brazil) Edson	Bahia
MF	(Brazil) Régis ^{a}	Bahia
MF	(Brazil) Diego Souza ^{b}	(Pernambuco) Sport
FW	(Brazil) David ^{c}	(Bahia) Vitória
FW	(Brazil) Edigar Junio	Bahia
Head coach	(Brazil) Guto Ferreira	Bahia

a. Best player and Top scorer
b. Best goal of the tournament (playing against Campinense, 59th minute)
c. Breakthrough player

Head coach
(Brazil) Guto Ferreira
