= 2017 Copa do Brasil First Round =

The 2017 Copa do Brasil First Round was played from 8 February to 16 February 2017, deciding the 40 teams that advanced to the Second Round. In this year, this round was decided in a single match. The lower ranked team hosted the match and, in tie cases, the higher ranked team advanced to next round.

== Matches ==
| Team 1 | Score | Team 2 |
|---|---|---|
| CSA (Alagoas) | 1–4 | (Pernambuco) Sport |
| Sete de Dourados (Mato Grosso do Sul) | 1–0 | (Piauí) Ríver |
| Uniclinic (Ceará) | 1–2 | (São Paulo (state)) Portuguesa |
| Boavista (Rio de Janeiro (state)) | 1–0 | Ceará |
| Rio Branco (Acre (state)) | 1–0 | (Santa Catarina (state)) Figueirense |
| Gurupi (Tocantins) | 2–1 | (Paraná (state)) Londrina |
| São Raimundo (Pará) | 2–1 | (Ceará) Fortaleza |
| Comercial (Mato Grosso do Sul) | 0–1 | (Santa Catarina (state)) Joinville |
| Volta Redonda (Rio de Janeiro (state)) | 1–2 | (Minas Gerais) Cruzeiro |
| São Francisco (Pará) | 3–0 | (Paraíba) Botafogo |
| Murici (Alagoas) | 3–1 | (Rio Grande do Sul) Juventude |
| Atlético Acreano (Acre (state)) | 0–2 | (Minas Gerais) América Mineiro |
| Globo (Rio Grande do Norte) | 2–5 | (Rio de Janeiro (state)) Fluminense |
| Sinop (Mato Grosso) | 1–0 | (Pernambuco) Salgueiro |
| Altos (Piauí) | 2–0 | (Alagoas) CRB |
| Santo André (São Paulo (state)) | 0–1 | (Santa Catarina (state)) Criciúma |
| Princesa do Solimões (Amazonas (Brazilian state)) | 0–2 | (Rio Grande do Sul) Internacional |
| Friburguense (Rio de Janeiro (state)) | 0–1 | (São Paulo (state)) Oeste |
| São José (Rio Grande do Sul) | 1–1 | (Maranhão) Sampaio Corrêa |
| Guarani de Juazeiro (Ceará) | 1–0 | (Pernambuco) Náutico |
| Caldense (Minas Gerais) | 0–1 | (São Paulo (state)) Corinthians |
| Brusque (Santa Catarina (state)) | 2–1 | (Pará) Remo |
| URT (Minas Gerais) | 1–2 | (Mato Grosso) Luverdense |
| Desportiva (Espírito Santo) | 1–2 | (Santa Catarina (state)) Avaí |
| Campinense (Paraíba) | 0–2 | (São Paulo (state)) Ponte Preta |
| Rondoniense (Rondônia) | 0–2 | (Mato Grosso) Cuiabá |
| São Raimundo (Roraima) | 0–2 | (Minas Gerais) Boa Esporte |
| Itabaiana (Sergipe) | 2–4 | Goiás |
| Santos (Amapá) | 0–2 | (Rio de Janeiro (state)) Vasco da Gama |
| Fast Clube (Amazonas (Brazilian state)) | 1–1 | (Goiás) Vila Nova |
| Anápolis (Goiás) | 0–0 | (São Paulo (state)) Bragantino |
| Luziânia (Federal District (Brazil)) | 0–2 | (Bahia) Vitória |
| Vitória da Conquista (Bahia) | 1–1 | (Paraná (state)) Coritiba |
| Ferroviária (São Paulo (state)) | 1–1 | (Alagoas) ASA |
| São Bento (São Paulo (state)) | 1–1 | (Paraná (state)) Paraná |
| Sergipe | 0–2 | Bahia |
| Moto Club (Maranhão) | 0–1 | (São Paulo (state)) São Paulo |
| PSTC (Paraná (state)) | 2–1 | (Rio Grande do Sul) Ypiranga |
| Audax (São Paulo (state)) | 1–0 | (Rio Grande do Norte) América de Natal |
| Ceilândia (Federal District (Brazil)) | 1–1 | (Rio Grande do Norte) ABC |

=== Match 1 ===
February 8, 2017
21:30 UTC−03:00

| CSA (Alagoas) | 1–4 | (Pernambuco) Sport |
|---|---|---|
| Alex Henrique 33' | Report | Rithely 24'; Everton Felipe 50'; Rogério 61'; Thallyson 76' |

Estádio Rei Pelé, Maceió
Attendance: 6,312
Referee: Igor Junio Benevenuto (Minas Gerais)

=== Match 2 ===
February 8, 2017
21:30 UTC−02:00

| Sete de Dourados (Mato Grosso do Sul) | 1–0 | (Piauí) Ríver |
|---|---|---|
| Juan 45' | Report |

Douradão, Dourados
Attendance: 2,542
Referee: Cleber Vaz da Silva (Goiás)

=== Match 3 ===
February 15, 2017
21:30 UTC−03:00

| Uniclinic (Ceará) | 1–2 | (São Paulo (state)) Portuguesa |
|---|---|---|
| Edson Cariús 64' | Report | Bruno Xavier 57'; Bruno Silva 85' |

Domingão, Horizonte
Attendance: 104
Referee: Eder Caxias Meneses (Paraíba)

=== Match 4 ===
February 15, 2017
16:00 UTC−02:00

| Boavista (Rio de Janeiro (state)) | 1–0 | Ceará |
|---|---|---|
| Marcelo Nicácio 90+5' (pen.) | Report |

Estádio Elcyr Resende de Mendonça, Saquarema
Attendance: 681
Referee: Felipe Duarte Varejão (Espírito Santo)

=== Match 5 ===
February 15, 2017
20:30 UTC−05:00

| Rio Branco (Acre (state)) | 1–0 | (Santa Catarina (state)) Figueirense |
|---|---|---|
| Leo Fernandes 82' | Report |

Arena da Floresta, Rio Branco
Attendance: 1,412
Referee: Antonio Carlos Pequeno Frutuoso (Amazonas)

=== Match 6 ===
February 8, 2017
20:30 UTC−03:00

| Gurupi (Tocantins) | 2–1 | (Paraná (state)) Londrina |
|---|---|---|
| Patrick 2'; Alan Kardek 22' | Report | Safira 18' |

Estádio Gilberto Resende, Gurupi
Attendance: 1,368
Referee: Rodrigo Batista Raposo (Distrito Federal

=== Match 7 ===
February 15, 2017
20:30 UTC−03:00

| São Raimundo (Pará) | 2–1 | (Ceará) Fortaleza |
|---|---|---|
| Tiago 34' (pen.), 75' | Report | Heitor 24' |

Estádio Jader Barbalho, Santarém
Attendance: 4,141
Referee: Carlos Ronne Casas de Paiva (Acre)

=== Match 8 ===
February 15, 2017
20:45 UTC−02:00

| Comercial (Mato Grosso do Sul) | 0–1 | (Santa Catarina (state)) Joinville |
|---|---|---|
| | Report | Aldair 53' |

Morenão, Campo Grande
Attendance: 418
Referee: Wanderson Alves de Sousa (Minas Gerais)

=== Match 9 ===
February 15, 2017
21:45 UTC−02:00

| Volta Redonda (Rio de Janeiro (state)) | 1–2 | (Minas Gerais) Cruzeiro |
|---|---|---|
| Higor 67' | Report | Alisson 15'; Robinho 61' |

Estádio Raulino de Oliveira, Volta Redonda
Attendance: 2,819
Referee: Marcelo Aparecido Ribeiro de Souza (São Paulo)

=== Match 10 ===
February 8, 2017
20:30 UTC−03:00

| São Francisco (Pará) | 3–0 | (Paraíba) Botafogo |
|---|---|---|
| Anderson Costa 33'; Marcos Alemão 52'; Fábio Paulista 90+2' | Report |

Estádio Jader Barbalho, Santarém
Attendance: 2,465
Referee: Edmar Campos Encarnação (Amazonas)

=== Match 11 ===
February 8, 2017
16:00 UTC−03:00

| Murici (Alagoas) | 3–1 | (Rio Grande do Sul) Juventude |
|---|---|---|
| Tarcísio 16' (pen.), 49'; Delsinho 38' | Report | Tadeu 19' |

Estádio José Gomes da Costa, Murici
Attendance: 312
Referee: Renan Roberto de Souza (Paraíba)

=== Match 12 ===
February 8, 2017
20:30 UTC−05:00

| Atlético Acreano (Acre (state)) | 0–2 | (Minas Gerais) América Mineiro |
|---|---|---|
| | Report | Hugo 29'; Renan Oliveira 87' |

Arena da Floresta, Rio Branco
Attendance: 1,865
Referee: Flávio Rodrigues de Souza (São Paulo)

=== Match 13 ===
February 15, 2017
20:45 UTC−03:00

| Globo (Rio Grande do Norte) | 2–5 | (Rio de Janeiro (state)) Fluminense |
|---|---|---|
| Denis 41'; Glaucio 74' | Report | Lucas 6'; Henrique Dourado 23', 32'; Wellington 50'; Gustavo Scarpa 62' |

Estádio Manoel Dantas Barretto, Ceará-Mirim
Attendance: 1,786
Referee: Thiago Duarte Peixoto (São Paulo)

=== Match 14 ===
February 16, 2017
21:30 UTC−02:00

| Sinop (Mato Grosso) | 1–0 | (Pernambuco) Salgueiro |
|---|---|---|
| Jorge Preá 85' | Report |

Estádio Municipal Gigante do Norte, Sinop
Attendance: 2,351
Referee: Bruno Rezende Silva (Goiás)

=== Match 15 ===
February 8, 2017
20:30 UTC−03:00

| Altos (Piauí) | 2–0 | (Alagoas) CRB |
|---|---|---|
| Joelson 19'; Uilliam 68' | Report |

Estádio Lindolfo Monteiro, Teresina
Attendance: 870
Referee: Gilberto Rodrigues Castro Júnior (Pernambuco)

=== Match 16 ===
February 16, 2017
16:00 UTC−02:00

| Santo André (São Paulo (state)) | 0–1 | (Santa Catarina (state)) Criciúma |
|---|---|---|
| | Report | Alex Maranhão 86' |

Estádio Bruno José Daniel, Santo André
Attendance: 1,623
Referee: Lucas Paulo Torezin (Paraná)

=== Match 17 ===
February 15, 2017
19:45 UTC−04:00

| Princesa do Solimões (Amazonas (Brazilian state)) | 0–2 | (Rio Grande do Sul) Internacional |
|---|---|---|
| | Report | Valdívia 61'; Brenner 81' |

Estádio Olímpico Regional Arnaldo Busatto, Cascavel
Attendance: 4,984
Referee: Paulo Roberto Alves Júnior (Paraná)

=== Match 18 ===
February 15, 2017
20:30 UTC−02:00

| Friburguense (Rio de Janeiro (state)) | 0–1 | (São Paulo (state)) Oeste |
|---|---|---|
| | Report | Mazinho 69' |

Estádio Eduardo Guinle, Nova Friburgo
Attendance: 2,201
Referee: Devarly Lira do Rosario (Espírito Santo)

=== Match 19 ===
February 9, 2017
19:15 UTC−02:00

| São José (Rio Grande do Sul) | 1–1 | (Maranhão) Sampaio Corrêa |
|---|---|---|
| Rafinha 90+3' (pen.) | Report | Artur 45' |

Estádio do Vale, Novo Hamburgo
Attendance: 88
Referee: William Machado Steffen (Santa Catarina)

=== Match 20 ===
February 15, 2017
20:30 UTC−03:00

| Guarani de Juazeiro (Ceará) | 1–0 | (Pernambuco) Náutico |
|---|---|---|
| Ítalo 54' | Report |

Estádio Mauro Sampaio, Juazeiro do Norte
Attendance: 2,803
Referee: Antonio Dib Moraes de Sousa (Piauí)

=== Match 21 ===
February 8, 2017
21:45 UTC−02:00

| Caldense (Minas Gerais) | 0–1 | (São Paulo (state)) Corinthians |
|---|---|---|
| | Report | Rodriguinho 40' |

Ronaldão, Poços de Caldas
Attendance: 7,536
Referee: Bruno Arleu de Araújo (Rio de Janeiro)

=== Match 22 ===
February 16, 2017
19:15 UTC−02:00

| Brusque (Santa Catarina (state)) | 2–1 | (Pará) Remo |
|---|---|---|
| Jonatas Belusso 25'; Ricardo Lobo 58' | Report | Zé Antônio 34' |

Estádio Augusto Bauer, Brusque
Attendance: 2,875
Referee: Daniel Nobre Bins (Rio Grande do Sul)

=== Match 23 ===
February 15, 2017
20:30 UTC−02:00

| URT (Minas Gerais) | 1–2 | (Mato Grosso) Luverdense |
|---|---|---|
| Allan Dias 67' | Report | Macena 33'; Ricardo 90' |

Estádio Zama Maciel, Patos de Minas
Attendance: 3,378
Referee: Savio Pereira Sampaio (Distrito Federal)

=== Match 24 ===
February 15, 2017
19:15 UTC−02:00

| Desportiva (Espírito Santo) | 1–2 | (Santa Catarina (state)) Avaí |
|---|---|---|
| Israel 75' | Report | Diego Jardel 28'; Rômulo 62' |

Estádio Engenheiro Alencar Araripe, Cariacica
Attendance: 1,228
Referee: Alexandre Vargas Tavares de Jesus (Rio de Janeiro)

=== Match 25 ===
February 8, 2017
18:30 UTC−03:00

| Campinense (Paraíba) | 0–2 | (São Paulo (state)) Ponte Preta |
|---|---|---|
| | Report | William Pottker 71' (pen.); Lins 73' |

Amigão, Campina Grande
Attendance: 8,969
Referee: Charles Hebert Cavalcante Ferreira (Alagoas)

=== Match 26 ===
February 8, 2017
19:30 UTC−04:00

| Rondoniense (Rondônia) | 0–2 | (Mato Grosso) Cuiabá |
|---|---|---|
| | Report | Léo Salino 62'; Cleberson 87' |

Estádio Aluízio Ferreira, Porto Velho
Attendance: 1,050
Referee: José Antonio de Almeida Pinheiro (Acre)

=== Match 27 ===
February 8, 2017
19:30 UTC−04:00

| São Raimundo (Roraima) | 0–2 | (Minas Gerais) Boa Esporte |
|---|---|---|
| | Report | Lelêu 52'; Kaio Cristian 90' |

Estádio Vila Olímpica Roberto Marinho, Boa Vista
Attendance: 575
Referee: Joelson Nazareno Ferreira Cardoso (Pará)

=== Match 28 ===
February 15, 2017
20:30 UTC−03:00

| Itabaiana (Sergipe) | 2–4 | Goiás |
|---|---|---|
| Diego Neves 62'; Paulinho Macaíba 80' | Report | Léo Gamalho 7', 14'; Carlos Eduardo 40'; Pedro Bambu 55' |

Estádio Etelvino Mendonça, Itabaiana
Attendance: 1,506
Referee: José Mendonça da Silva Júnior (Paraná)

=== Match 29 ===
February 9, 2017
20:00 UTC−03:00

| Santos (Amapá) | 0–2 | (Rio de Janeiro (state)) Vasco da Gama |
|---|---|---|
| | Report | Nenê 21' (pen.), 90' (pen.) |

Arena das Dunas, Natal
Attendance: 5,321
Referee: Luiz César de Oliveira Magalhães (Ceará)

=== Match 30 ===
February 16, 2017
20:30 UTC−04:00

| Fast Clube (Amazonas (Brazilian state)) | 1–1 | (Goiás) Vila Nova |
|---|---|---|
| Thiago 87' | Report | Moisés Brito 68' |

Arena da Amazônia, Manaus
Attendance: 1,993
Referee: Joelson Nazareno Ferreira Cardoso (Pará)

=== Match 31 ===
February 15, 2017
19:15 UTC−02:00

| Anápolis (Goiás) | 0–0 | (São Paulo (state)) Bragantino |
|---|---|---|
| | Report |

Estádio Jonas Duarte, Anápolis
Attendance: 3,340
Referee: Rodrigo Alonso Ferreira (Santa Catarina)

=== Match 32 ===
February 8, 2017
19:30 UTC−02:00

| Luziânia (Federal District (Brazil)) | 0–2 | (Bahia) Vitória |
|---|---|---|
| | Report | Kieza 23'; Paulinho 55' |

Estádio Zequinha Roriz, Luziânia
Attendance: 1,216
Referee: Jean Pierre Gonçalves Lima (Rio Grande do Sul)

=== Match 33 ===
February 8, 2017
18:15 UTC−03:00

| Vitória da Conquista (Bahia) | 1–1 | (Paraná (state)) Coritiba |
|---|---|---|
| Todinho 52' | Report | Werley 79' |

Estádio Municipal Lomanto Júnior, Vitória da Conquista
Attendance: 2,756
Referee: Claudio Francisco Lima e Silva (Sergipe)

=== Match 34 ===
February 8, 2017
20:30 UTC−02:00

| Ferroviária (São Paulo (state)) | 1–1 | (Alagoas) ASA |
|---|---|---|
| Tiago Marques 31' | Report | Leandro Kivel 90' |

Estádio Fonte Luminosa, Araraquara
Attendance: 2,028
Referee: Alisson Sidnei Furtado (Tocantins)

=== Match 35 ===
February 8, 2017
20:30 UTC−02:00

| São Bento (São Paulo (state)) | 1–1 | (Paraná (state)) Paraná |
|---|---|---|
| Itaqui 23' | Report | Renatinho 90' |

Estádio Municipal Walter Ribeiro, Sorocaba
Attendance: 3,381
Referee: Dyorgines José Padovani de Andrade (Espírito Santo)

=== Match 36 ===
February 16, 2017
20:30 UTC−03:00

| Sergipe | 0–2 | Bahia |
|---|---|---|
| | Report | Régis 55'; Diego Rosa 68' |

Batistão, Aracaju
Attendance: 5,974
Referee: Grazziani Maciel Rocha (Rio de Janeiro)

=== Match 37 ===
February 9, 2017
20:30 UTC−03:00

| Moto Club (Maranhão) | 0–1 | (São Paulo (state)) São Paulo |
|---|---|---|
| | Report | Gilberto 2' |

Castelão, São Luís
Attendance: 21,402
Referee: Jailson Macedo Freitas (Bahia)

=== Match 38 ===
February 8, 2017
20:30 UTC−02:00

| PSTC (Paraná (state)) | 2–1 | (Rio Grande do Sul) Ypiranga |
|---|---|---|
| Lucas Trindade 40'; Carlos 85' | Report | Michel 65' |

Estádio Municipal Ubirajara Medeiros, Cornélio Procópio
Attendance: 1,371
Referee: Paulo Henrique de Melo Salmazio (Mato Grosso do Sul)

=== Match 39 ===
February 8, 2017
20:30 UTC−02:00

| Audax (São Paulo (state)) | 1–0 | (Rio Grande do Norte) América de Natal |
|---|---|---|
| Rafinha 84' | Report |

Estádio José Liberatti, Osasco
Attendance: 1,069
Referee: Rafael Traci (Paraná)

=== Match 40 ===
February 15, 2017
16:00 UTC−02:00

| Ceilândia (Federal District (Brazil)) | 1–1 | (Rio Grande do Norte) ABC |
|---|---|---|
| Elivelto 65' | Report | Erivélton 28' |

Estádio Maria de Lourdes Abadia, Ceilândia
Attendance: 439
Referee: Francisco Carlos do Nascimento (Alagoas)
