= Thallyson =

Thalles may refer to:

- Thallyson (footballer, born 1991), full name Thallyson Augusto Tavares Dias, Brazilian football left-back
- Thallyson (footballer, born 1996), full name Thallyson Gabriel Lobo Seabra, Brazilian football midfielder

== See also ==
- Thalisson (born 1998), full name Thalisson Kelven da Silva, Brazilian football centre-back
