= 2016 Campeonato Baiano =

Campeonato Baiano
- Season: 2016
- Champions: Vitória
- Relegated: Feirense; Colo Colo
- Série D: Juazeirense; Fluminense; Galícia
- Copa do Brasil: Bahia; Vitória
- Copa do Nordeste: Vitória; Bahia; Juazeirense
- Top goalscorer: Nino Guerreiro (Sociedade Desportiva Juazeirense)- 6 goals

The 2016 Campeonato Baiano is the 112th edition of Bahia's top professional football league. The competition began on 30 January 2016. Bahia are the defending champions having won their 46th title.

== Teams ==
- Bahia
- Bahia de Feira
- Colo Colo
- Feirense
- Flamengo
- Fluminense
- Galícia
- Jacobina
- Jacuipense
- Juazeirense
- Vitória
- Vitória da Conquista

== League tables ==
=== Group 1 ===
Pos	Team	Pld	W	D	L	GF	GA	GD	Pts	Qualification
1	Vitória	6	4	1	1	11	3	+8	13	Qualification to the Quarterfinals
2	Galícia	6	4	0	2	10	6	+4	12	Qualification to the Quarterfinals
3	Juazeirense	6	3	1	2	9	4	+5	10	Qualification to the Quarterfinals
4	Flamengo	6	2	2	2	5	5	0	8	Qualification to the Quarterfinals
5	Bahia de Feira	6	2	2	2	10	11	−1	8	Qualification to the Quarterfinals
6	Colo Colo	6	0	2	4	6	14	−8	2	Relegation Play-offs

Updated to match(es) played on 13 March 2016. Source: Group 1
Rules for classification: 1) points; 2) goal difference; 3) number of goals scored.

=== Group 2 ===
Pos	Team	Pld	W	D	L	GF	GA	GD	Pts	Qualification
1	Bahia	6	5	0	1	14	7	+7	15	Qualification to the Quarterfinals
2	Jacobina	6	4	0	2	10	7	+3	12	Qualification to the Quarterfinals
3	Fluminense	6	2	3	1	5	4	+1	9	Qualification to the Quarterfinals
4	Vitória da Conquista	6	1	3	2	7	7	0	6	Relegation Play-offs
5	Feirense	6	1	0	5	2	12	−10	3	Relegation Play-offs
6	Jacuipense	6	0	2	4	6	17	−11	2	Relegation Play-offs

Updated to match(es) played on 13 March 2016. Source: Group 2
Rules for classification: 1) points; 2) goal difference; 3) number of goals scored.

== Relegation playoffs ==
Team 1	Agg.	Team 2	1st leg	2nd leg
Colo Colo	1–2	Vitória da Conquista	0–0	1–2
Jacuipense	3–1	Feirense	2–1	1–0

== Quarterfinals ==
Team 1	Agg.	Team 2	1st leg	2nd leg
Juazeirense	2–1	Jacobina	2–0	0–1
Flamengo	1–3	Vitória	1–0	0–3
Fluminense	3–0	Galícia	3–0	0–1
Bahia de Feira	1–4	Bahia	0–2	1–2

== Semifinals ==
Team 1	Agg.	Team 2	1st leg	2nd leg
Juazeirense	2–6	Vitória	2–3	0–3
Fluminense	1–4	Bahia	0–2	1–2

== 3rd place playoffs ==
Team 1	Agg.	Team 2	1st leg	2nd leg
Fluminense	1–1	Juazeirense	0–0	1–1

== Finals ==
May 1, 2016
16:00 UTC−4

Vitória	2–0	Bahia
Diego Renan 23' (pen.); Amaral 73'	Report

Estádio Barradão, Salvador
Attendance: 20,174
Referee: Anderson Daronco

May 8, 2016
16:00 UTC−4

Bahia	1-0	Vitória
Feijão 21'	Report

Arena Fonte Nova, Salvador
Attendance: 20,804
Referee: Leandro Vuaden

Vitória won 2–1 on aggregate.
