= Ariano Suassuna Trophy =

Ariano Suassuna Trophy Taça Ariano Suassuna
- Founded: 2015
- Region: Pernambuco
- Teams: 2
- Current champions: Sport Recife
- Most championships: Sport Recife
- Broadcaster: Esporte Interativo (2015–2016) SporTV (2017)
- Website: Official homepage

The Ariano Suassuna Trophy (Portuguese: Taça Ariano Suassuna) or Ariano Suassuna Cup is an annual friendly football competition held in January, before the football season in Brazil.

The competition is hosted by Sport Recife and is named in honour of Ariano Suassuna, a Brazilian playwright, author and one of Sport Recife's most famous fans.

== Editions ==
Edition	Year	Winner	Score	Runner-up	Venue
1	2015	(Brazil) Sport Recife	2–1	(Uruguay) Nacional	Arena Pernambuco
2	2016	(Brazil) Sport Recife	2–0	(Argentina) Argentinos Juniors	Ilha do Retiro
3	2017	(Brazil) Sport Recife	1–1 (4–2 p)	(Bolivia) The Strongest	Arena Pernambuco
4	2018	(Brazil) Sport Recife	2–0	(Argentina) Atlético Tucumán	Ilha do Retiro

== Performance by team ==
Team	Winners	Runners-up
(Brazil) Sport Recife	4	0
(Uruguay) Nacional	0	1
(Argentina) Argentinos Juniors	0	1
(Bolivia) The Strongest	0	1
(Argentina) Atlético Tucumán	0	1

== Performance by nations ==
Nation	Winners	Runners-up
(Brazil) Brasil	4	0
Argentina	0	2
Bolivia	0	1
(Uruguay) Uruguai	0	1
