= Raul Prata =

Brazilian footballer

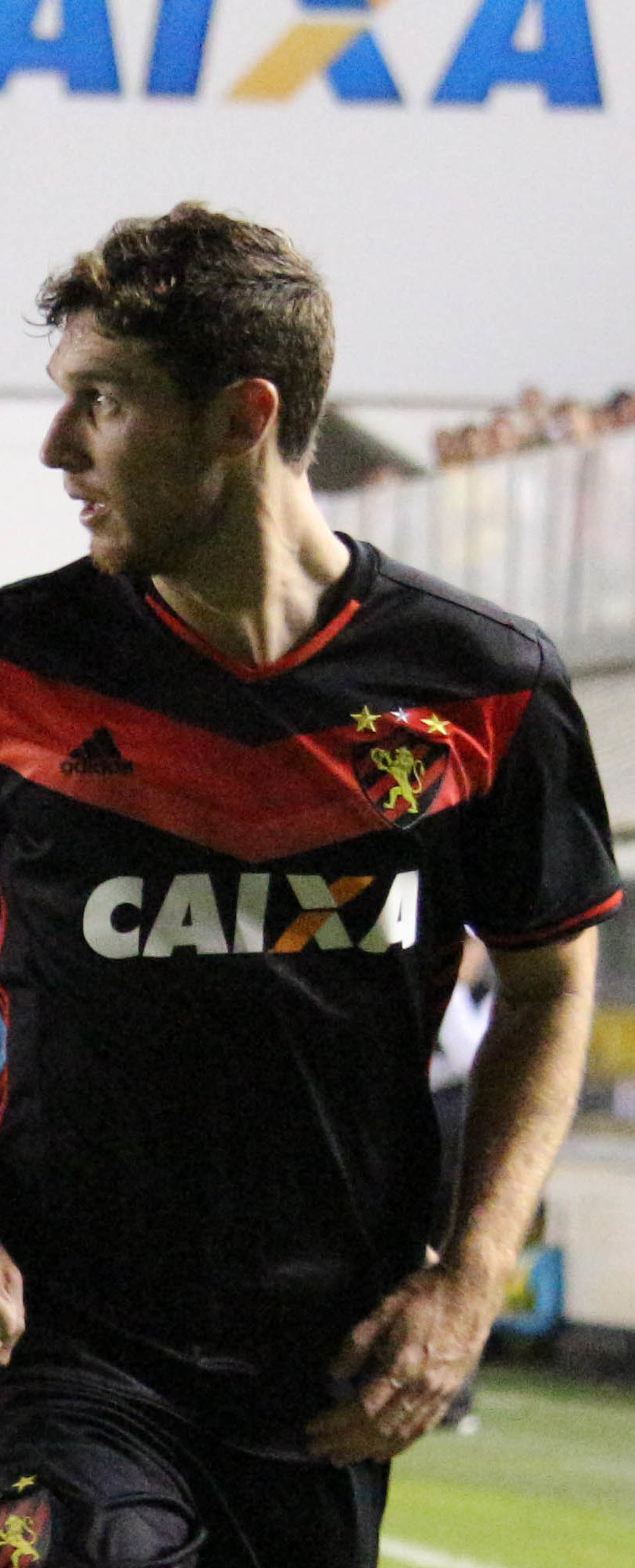

Personal information
- Full name: Raul Prata
- Date of birth: 14 July 1987 (age 39)
- Place of birth: Piracicaba, Brazil
- Height: 1.78 m (5 ft 10 in)
- Position: Right back

Team information
- Current team: Novorizontino

Senior career*
Years	Team	Apps	(Gls)
2007	Mogi Mirim		
2008–2009	Guaratinguetá		
2009	→ XV de Piracicaba (loan)	0	(0)
2010	Vila Aurora	10	(1)
2011–2016	Luverdense	109	(2)
2016	→ Ituano (loan)	9	(0)
2017–2021	Sport	108	(0)
2021	Vitória	35	(1)
2022	CRB	44	(1)
2023–	Novorizontino	17	(0)
- * Club domestic league appearances and goals as of 4 January 2017

Raul Prata (born 14 July 1987) is a Brazilian footballer who plays for Novorizontino as a right back.

== Career ==
Born in Piracicaba, Raul Prata made his senior debut by the local team XV de Piracicaba. After a long passage by Luverdense and a short by Ituano, Raul Prata signed with Botafogo–SP on 24 December 2016. On 10 January 2017, he left Botafogo without any match by the club, when he signed with Sport.

== Career statistics ==
As of 6 February 2017

Club	Season	League			State League		Cup		Conmebol		Other		Total	
Club	Season	Division	Apps	Goals	Apps	Goals	Apps	Goals	Apps	Goals	Apps	Goals	Apps	Goals
XV de Piracicaba	2009	Paulista A3	—		8	0	—		—		—		8	0
Vila Aurora	2010	Série D	10	1	15	3	—		—		—		25	4
Luverdense	2011	Série C	10	0	9	1	—		—		—		19	1
Luverdense	2012	Série C	17	2	17	0	2	1	—		—		36	3
Luverdense	2013	Série C	18	0	15	1	8	0	—		—		41	1
Luverdense	2014	Série B	11	0	13	0	—		—		—		24	0
Luverdense	2015	Série B	20	0	5	0	2	0	—		2	0	29	0
Luverdense	2016	Série B	33	0	—		—		—		—		33	0
Luverdense	Subtotal		109	2	59	2	12	1	—		2	0	182	5
Ituano	2016	Série D	—		9	0	—		—		—		9	0
Sport	2017	Série A	—		1	0	—		—		—		1	0
Career total			119	3	92	5	12	1	0	0	2	0	225	9
