= Agenor (footballer, born 1989) =

Brazilian footballer

Personal information
- Full name: Agenor Detofol
- Date of birth: 11 December 1989 (age 36)
- Place of birth: Erechim, Brazil
- Height: 1.87 m (6 ft 1 1/2 in)
- Position: Goalkeeper

Team information
- Current team: CEOV

Youth career
- –2008: Internacional

Senior career*
Years	Team	Apps	(Gls)
2008–2015	Internacional	22	(0)
2010	→ Criciúma (loan)	0	(0)
2015–2016	Joinville	47	(0)
2016–2018	Sport Recife	17	(0)
2018	Guaraní	17	(0)
2019	Fluminense	7	(0)
2020	Criciúma	24	(2)
2021	Sagamihara	5	(0)
2023–	CEOV	1	(0)

International career
	Brazil U20	2	(0)
- * Club domestic league appearances and goals as of 22:43, 6 March 2021 (UTC)

Agenor Detofol commonly known as Agenor (born 11 December 1989) is a Brazilian footballer who plays as a goalkeeper for CEOV.
