= Matheus Ferraz =

Brazilian footballer

Personal information
- Full name: Matheus Ferraz Pereira
- Date of birth: 12 February 1985 (age 41)
- Place of birth: São José do Rio Pardo, Brazil
- Height: 1.90 m (6 ft 3 in)
- Position: Centre-back

Youth career
- Santos

Senior career*
Years	Team	Apps	(Gls)
2005–2006	Santos	4	(0)
2007	América-SP	11	(2)
2007	→ Remo (loan)	5	(1)
2008	União São João	8	(0)
2008	→ Brasiliense (loan)	0	(0)
2009	Noroeste	4	(1)
2010	São Caetano	4	(0)
2011	Noroeste	13	(2)
2011–2012	Mirassol	29	(0)
2012	Criciúma	37	(2)
2012–2013	AEL Limassol	0	(0)
2013	Criciúma	54	(4)
2014	FC Tokyo	0	(0)
2015	Boa Esporte	5	(0)
2015–2017	Sport Recife	85	(9)
2017	Goiás	11	(0)
2018	América Mineiro	34	(0)
2019–2023	Fluminense	50	(4)
- * Club domestic league appearances and goals as of 19:06, 4 November 2021 (UTC)

Matheus Ferraz Pereira (born 12 February 1985) is a Brazilian professional footballer who plays as a central defender for Fluminense FC.

In 2014, at 29 years of age, Ferraz embraced Asian football by signing for FC Tokyo of Japan.

== Honours ==
Brasiliense

- Campeonato Brasiliense: 2008

Criciúma

- Campeonato Catarinense: 2013

América Mineiro

- Campeonato Brasileiro Série B: 2017

Fluminense

- Taça Guanabara: 2022
- Campeonato Carioca: 2022
