= Fabrício Bigode =

Brazilian footballer (born 1998)

Personal information
- Full name: Fabrício Silva Costa
- Date of birth: 3 June 1998 (age 28)
- Place of birth: Arapiraca, Brazil
- Height: 1.71 m (5 ft 7 1/2 in)
- Position: Midfielder

Youth career
- Sport Recife

Senior career*
Years	Team	Apps	(Gls)
2017–2018	Sport Recife	22	(1)
2017	→ Oeste (loan)	6	(0)
2018	→ Guarani (loan)	10	(1)
2019	Guarani	8	(0)
2019	Vejle BK	0	(0)
2019	→ Ventspils (loan)	0	(0)
2020	Portuguesa	6	(0)
- * Club domestic league appearances and goals as of 22:04, 8 August 2020 (UTC)

Fabrício Silva Costa (born 3 August 1998), known as Fabrício Bigode, is a Brazilian footballer who currently plays as a midfielder.

== Career ==
Fabrício Bigode was loaned out from Sport Recife to Guarani for the 2018 season. After the loan spell ended, the club announced that the player had resigned from his contract with Sport Recife, to join Guarani permanently on a contract until 2020.

On 4 July 2019, Danish club Vejle Boldklub announced that they had signed Fabrício Bigode and immediately loaned him out to Latvian club FK Ventspils.

== Career statistics ==
=== Club ===
As of 29 March 2019.

Club	Season	League			Cup		Continental		Other		Total	
Club	Season	Division	Apps	Goals	Apps	Goals	Apps	Goals	Apps	Goals	Apps	Goals
Sport	2017	Série A	7	0	9 (Note: Five appearances in Copa do Nordeste, four appearances in the Copa do Brasil)	0	2 (Note: Appearances in the Copa Sudamericana)	1	6 (Note: Appearances in the Campeonato Pernambucano)	0	24	1
Sport	2018	Série A	3	0	2 (Note: Appearances in the Copa do Brasil)	1	–		6	1	11	2
Sport	Total		10	0	11	1	2	1	12	1	35	3
Oeste (loan)	2017	Série B	6	0	0	0	–		0	0	6	0
Guarani (loan)	2018	Série B	2	0	0	0	–		0	0	2	0
Guarani	2019	Série B	0	0	0	0	–		8 (Note: Appearances in the Campeonato Paulista)	0	8	0
Career total			18	0	11	1	2	1	20	1	51	3
