= Samuel Xavier =

Brazilian footballer (born 1990)

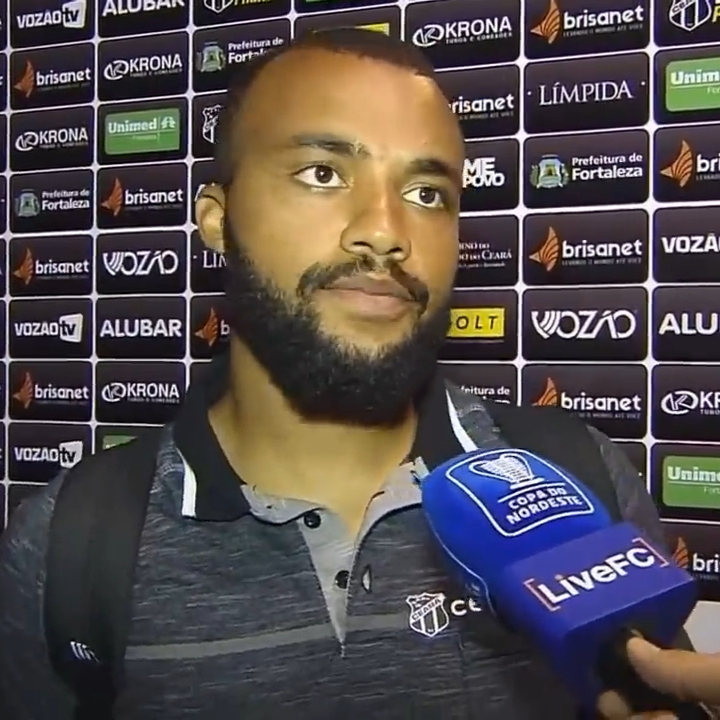

Personal information
- Full name: Samuel Xavier Brito
- Date of birth: 6 June 1990 (age 36)
- Place of birth: São Paulo, Brazil
- Height: 1.67 m (5 ft 6 in)
- Position: Right back

Team information
- Current team: Fluminense
- Number: 2

Senior career*
Years	Team	Apps	(Gls)
2010–2012	Paulista	29	(1)
2012–2013	São Caetano	62	(0)
2014–2015	Ceará	60	(3)
2015–2018	Sport Recife	110	(1)
2018	→ Atlético Mineiro (loan)	4	(0)
2018	→ Ceará (loan)	25	(1)
2019–2021	Ceará	75	(3)
2021–	Fluminense	193	(9)
- * Club domestic league appearances and goals as of 6 April 2026

Samuel Xavier Brito (born 6 June 1990), known as Samuel Xavier, is a Brazilian footballer who plays as a right back for Fluminense.

== Club career ==
In January 2019, Samuel Xavier signed a permanent contract with Ceará, after spending the previous campaign on loan at the club.

== Career statistics ==
As of 10 December 2023

Club	Season	League			State League		Cup		Continental		Other		Total	
Club	Season	Division	Apps	Goals	Apps	Goals	Apps	Goals	Apps	Goals	Apps	Goals	Apps	Goals
Paulista	2010	Paulista	—		5	1	—		—		24 (Note: All appearance(s) in Copa Paulista)	0	29	1
Paulista	2011	Paulista	—		8	0	2	0	—		25	1	35	1
Paulista	2012	Paulista	—		16	0	2	0	—		—		18	0
Paulista	Subtotal		—		29	1	4	0	—		49	1	82	2
São Caetano	2012	Série B	21	0	—		—		—		—		21	0
São Caetano	2013	Série B	23	0	18	0	2	0	—		4	0	47	0
São Caetano	Subtotal		44	0	18	0	2	0	—		4	0	68	0
Ceará	2014	Série B	33	1	14	2	5	0	—		10 (Note: Appearance(s) in Copa do Nordeste)	1	62	4
Ceará	2015	Série B	—		13	0	2	0	—		10	0	25	0
Ceará	Subtotal		33	1	27	2	7	0	—		20	1	87	4
Sport Recife	2015	Série A	30	1	—		—		1 (Note: Appearance(s) in Copa Sudamericana)	0	—		31	1
Sport Recife	2016	Série A	35	0	13	0	—		2	0	9	1	59	1
Sport Recife	2017	Série A	24	0	8	0	7	1	5	0	11	0	55	1
Sport Recife	Subtotal		89	1	21	0	7	1	8	0	20	0	145	3
Atlético Mineiro (loan)	2018	Série A	0	0	4	0	3	0	1	0	—		8	0
Ceará	2018	Série A	25	1	—		—		—		—		25	1
Ceará	2019	Série A	33	0	7	1	4	0	—		7	1	51	2
Ceará	2020	Série A	28	1	7	1	7	0	—		11	1	53	3
Ceará	Subtotal		86	2	14	2	11	0	—		18	2	119	6
Fluminense	2021	Série A	30	0	4	0	6	0	5 (Note: Appearance(s) in Copa Libertadores)	0	—		45	0
Fluminense	2022	Série A	33	2	8	0	8	0	2	0	—		51	2
Fluminense	2023	Série A	25	1	12	1	4	0	11	2	—		52	4
Fluminense	Subtotal		88	3	24	1	18	0	18	2	18	2	148	6
Career total			338	7	137	6	52	0	27	2	111	5	665	20

== Honours ==
Paulista

- Copa Paulista: 2010, 2011

Ceará

- Campeonato Cearense: 2014
- Copa dos Campeões Cearenses: 2014
- Copa do Nordeste: 2015, 2020

Fluminense

- Taça Guanabara: 2022, 2023
- Campeonato Carioca: 2022, 2023
- Copa Libertadores: 2023
- Recopa Sudamericana: 2024
