= Halef Pitbull =

Brazilian footballer (born 1994)

Personal information
- Full name: Halef Silva Melo
- Date of birth: 20 August 1994 (age 32)
- Place of birth: Potiraguá, Brazil
- Height: 1.82 m (6 ft 0 in)
- Position: Forward

Team information
- Current team: Udon Banjan United
- Number: 31

Senior career*
Years	Team	Apps	(Gls)
2016	7 de Setembro	8	(3)
2016	Atlântico	11	(6)
2016	Vitória da Conquista	0	(0)
2017–2019	Cruzeiro	0	(0)
2017	→ Santa Cruz (loan)	28	(5)
2018	→ Ipatinga (loan)	3	(0)
2018	→ Santa Cruz (loan)	4	(0)
2019–2024	Berço SC	15	(8)
2020	→ Mito HollyHock (loan)	34	(8)
2021	→ São Bernardo (loan)	12	(2)
2021–2022	→ Jeddah (loan)	16	(7)
2022	→ ReinMeer Aomori (loan)	10	(4)
2023	→ Londrina (loan)	7	(0)
2023	→ Hercílio Luz (loan)	3	(0)
2024	CRAC	0	(0)
2025–	Udon Banjan United	0	(0)
- * Club domestic league appearances and goals as of 14:58, 4 January 2024 (UTC)

Halef Silva Melo (born 20 August 1994), commonly known as Halef Pitbull, is a Brazilian professional footballer who plays as a forward for Thai League 3 Northeastern region club Udon Banjan United.

== Career ==
In December 2023, Pitbull left Berço SC and agreed to return to Brazil, joining Série D club CRAC on 1 January 2024.

== Career statistics ==
As of match played 20 May 2023

Appearances and goals by club, season and competition
Club	Season	League			State league		Cup		Other		Total	
Club	Season	Division	Apps	Goals	Apps	Goals	Apps	Goals	Apps	Goals	Apps	Goals
7 de Setembro	2016	Série D	0	0	8 (Note: Appearances in Campeonato Sul-Mato-Grossense)	3	—		—		8	3
Atlântico	2016	—			11 (Note: Appearances in Campeonato Baiano Second Division)	6	—		—		11	6
Vitória da Conquista	2016	—			0	0	0	0	23 (Note: Appearances in Copa da Bahia)	15	23	15
Cruzeiro	2017	Série A	0	0	0	0	0	0	0	0	0	0
Santa Cruz (loan)	2017	Série B	17	2	11 (Note: Appearances in Campeonato Pernambucano)	3	1	0	9 (Note: Appearances in Copa do Nordeste)	4	38	9
Ipatinga (loan)	2018	—			3 (Note: Appearances in Campeonato Mineiro Módulo II)	0	—		—		3	0
Santa Cruz (loan)	2018	Série C	4	0	0	0	0	0	0	0	4	0
Berço SC	2019–20	Campeonato de Portugal	15	8	—		1	0	—		16	8
Mito HollyHock (loan)	2020	J2 League	34	8	—		—		—		34	8
São Bernardo (loan)	2021	—			12 (Note: Appearances in Campeonato Paulista Série A2)	2	—		0	0	12	2
Jeddah (loan)	2021–22	Saudi First Division League	16	7	—		—		—		16	7
ReinMeer Aomori (loan)	2022	Japan Football League	10	4	—		—		—		10	4
Londrina (loan)	2023	Série B	0	0	7 (Note: Appearances in Campeonato Paranaense)	0	0	0	—		7	0
Hercílio Luz (loan)	2023	Série D	3	0	0	0	—		0	0	3	0
CRAC	2024	Série D	0	0	0	0	—		—		0	0
Career total			99	29	52	14	2	0	32	19	185	62
