= Everton Felipe =

Brazilian footballer (born 1997)

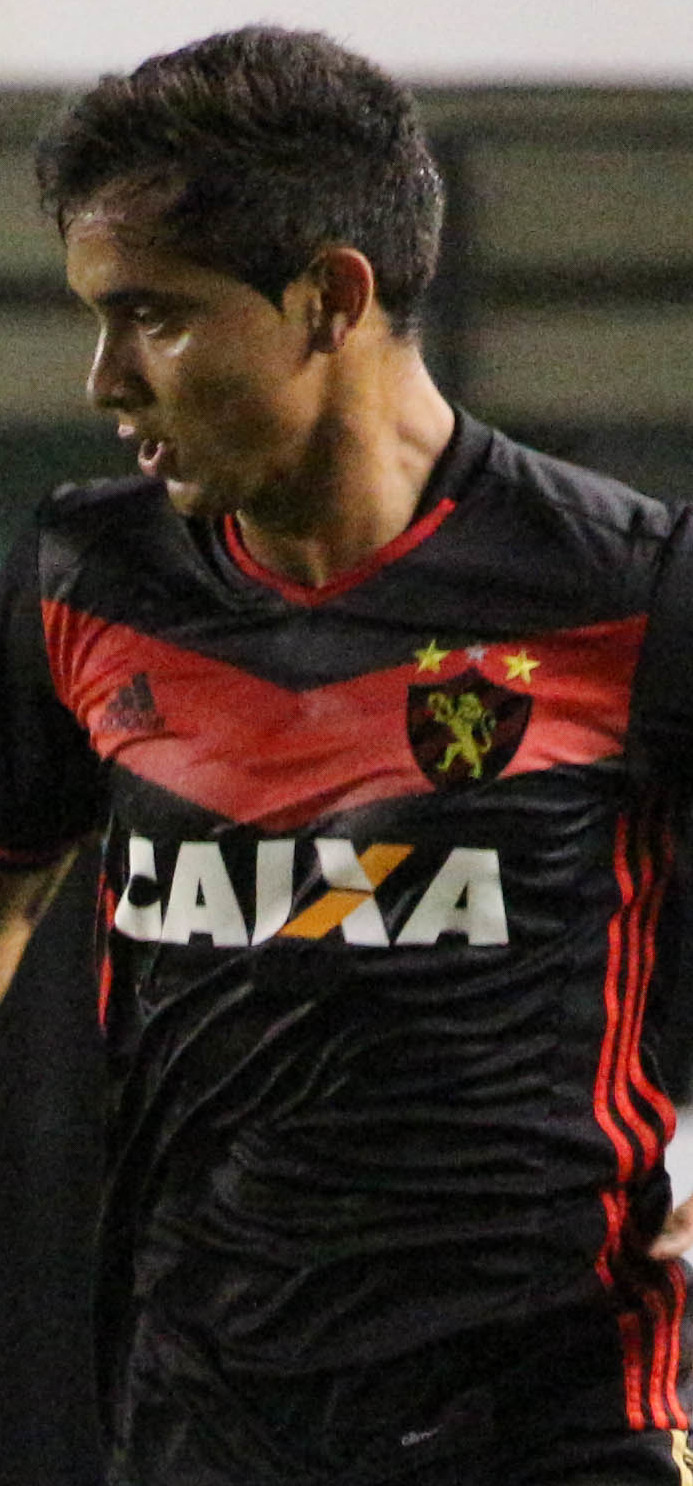
- Everton Felipe with Sport Recife in 2017

Personal information
- Full name: Everton Felipe de Oliveira Silva
- Date of birth: 28 July 1997 (age 29)
- Place of birth: Limoeiro, Brazil
- Height: 1.71 m (5 ft 7 in)
- Position: Attacking midfielder

Youth career
- 2011–2015: Sport Recife
- 2014–2015: → Internacional (loan)

Senior career*
Years	Team	Apps	(Gls)
2014–2018	Sport Recife	83	(4)
2018	→ São Paulo (loan)	6	(0)
2019–2021	São Paulo	19	(0)
2019	→ Athletico Paranaense (loan)	5	(0)
2020	→ Cruzeiro (loan)	7	(0)
2020–2021	→ Atlético Goianiense (loan)	14	(0)
2021–2022	Sport Recife	32	(1)
2023	Retrô	1	(0)
Total		167	(5)
- * Club domestic league appearances and goals

Everton Felipe de Oliveira Silva (born 28 July 1997), known as Everton Felipe, is a Brazilian former professional footballer who played as an attacking midfielder.

== Club career ==
=== Sport ===
Born in Limoeiro, Pernambuco, Everton Felipe joined Sport's youth setup in 2011, aged 13. On 19 January 2014, aged just 16, he made his first-team debut by coming on as a second-half substitute for Rithely in a 1–1 away draw against Botafogo-PB, for the year's Copa do Nordeste.

In May 2014, after the arrival of new manager Eduardo Baptista, Everton Felipe was loaned to Internacional until the end of 2015, and immediately joined the club's under-17 squad. Upon returning from loan, he was assigned to the main squad and renewed his contract until 2020 on 21 January 2016.

Everton Felipe made his Série A debut on 22 May 2016, replacing Reinaldo Lenis in a 1–1 home draw against Botafogo. He scored his first goal in the division on 11 September, netting his team's fifth in a 5–3 home defeat of Santa Cruz.

On 15 February 2017, Everton Felipe further extended his contract until February 2022. In September, he suffered a severe knee injury, being sidelined for seven months.

=== São Paulo ===
On 7 August 2018, Everton Felipe signed a four-year contract with fellow top division side São Paulo FC, for a fee of R$ 6 million for 40% of his federative rights.

== Honours ==
Sport

- Copa do Nordeste: 2014
- Campeonato Pernambucano: 2014, 2017

Atlético Goianiense

- Campeonato Goiano: 2020
