= Ronaldo Alves =

Brazilian footballer (born 1989)

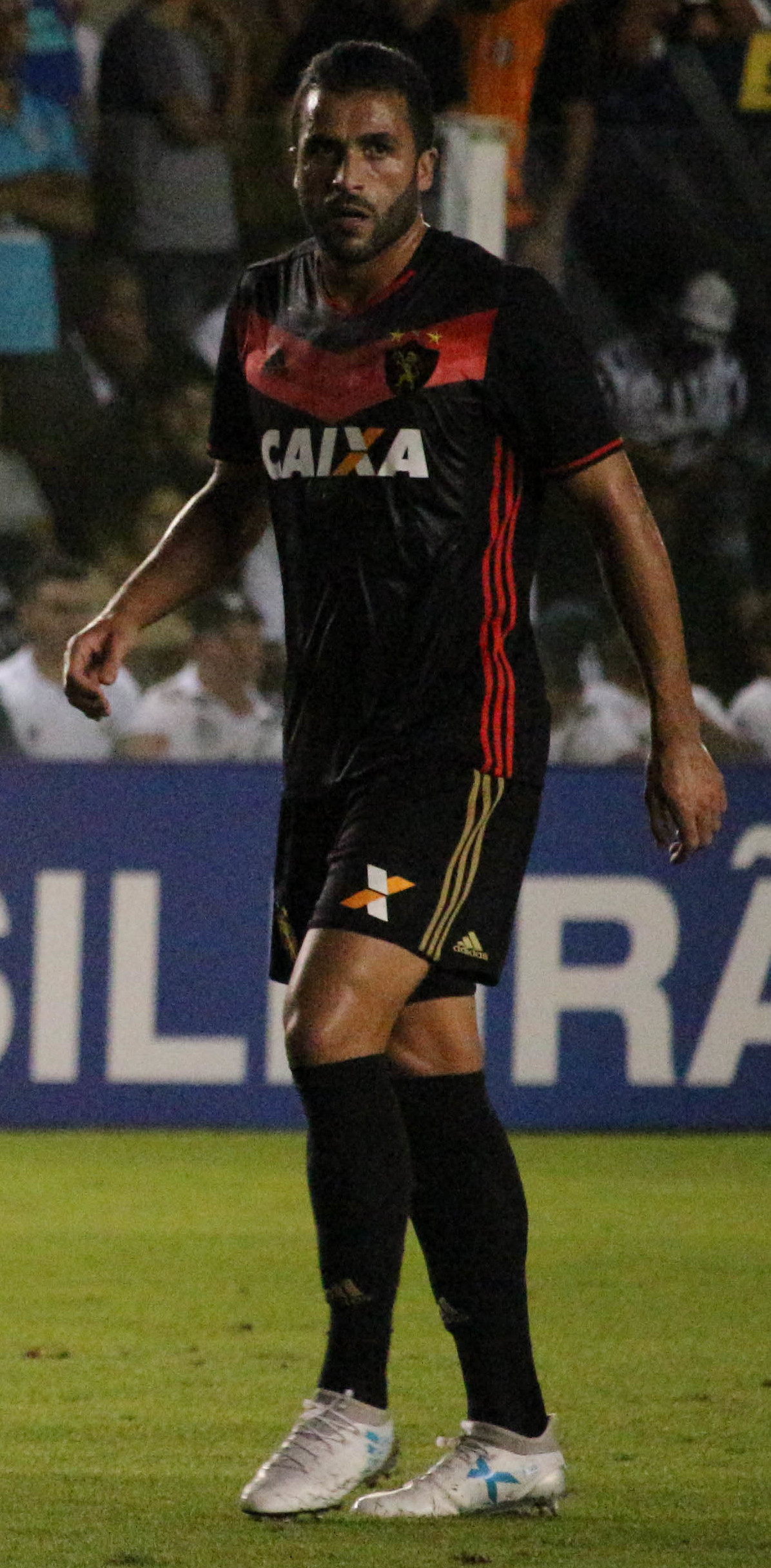
- Ronaldo Alves with Sport Recife in 2017

Personal information
- Full name: Ronaldo Luiz Alves
- Date of birth: 9 July 1989 (age 37)
- Place of birth: Bebedouro, Brazil
- Height: 1.87 m (6 ft 2 in)
- Position: Centre-back

Team information
- Current team: Ferroviária
- Number: 22

Youth career
- 2006–2009: Atlético Paranaense

Senior career*
Years	Team	Apps	(Gls)
2009	Atlético Paranaense	4	(0)
2010–2015	Internacional	16	(0)
2011	→ Náutico (loan)	30	(1)
2012	→ Náutico (loan)	24	(1)
2014	→ Criciúma (loan)	12	(1)
2015	→ Avaí (loan)	0	(0)
2015–2016	Náutico	46	(10)
2016–2019	Sport Recife	74	(2)
2019	CSA	7	(1)
2020–2021	Náutico	33	(1)
2021	→ Guarani (loan)	28	(2)
2022	Guarani	24	(0)
2023–	Ferroviária	55	(0)
- * Club domestic league appearances and goals as of 18 December 2025

Ronaldo Luiz Alves (born 9 July 1989), known as Ronaldo Alves, is a Brazilian footballer who plays as a centre-back for Ferroviária.

== Club ==
Internacional

- Copa FGF: 2010
- Taça Farroupilha: 2011, 2013
- Campeonato Gaucho: 2011, 2013
- Taça Piratini: 2013

Náutico

- Copa Pernambuco: 2011
- Campeonato Pernambucano: 2021
