= Thallyson (footballer, born 1996) =

Brazilian footballer

Personal information
- Full name: Thallyson Gabriel Lobo Seabra
- Date of birth: 24 March 1996 (age 30)
- Place of birth: Recife, Brazil
- Height: 1.81 m (5 ft 11 in)
- Position: Central midfielder

Team information
- Current team: Botafogo-PB
- Number: 20

Youth career
- Paraná
- Sport Recife

Senior career*
Years	Team	Apps	(Gls)
2017–2020	Sport Recife	34	(2)
2018	→ Boa (loan)	17	(0)
2019	→ Confiança (loan)	10	(0)
2020–2021	Vera Cruz		
2021	Retrô	17	(1)
2022–2023	ABC	25	(2)
2023	Manaus	10	(2)
2024	Cascavel	3	(0)
2024–	Botafogo-PB	73	(3)
2025	→ Volta Redonda (loan)	10	(0)
- * Club domestic league appearances and goals as of 8 November 2026

Thallyson Gabriel Lobo Seabra (born 24 March 1996) is a Brazilian footballer who plays as a central midfielder for Botafogo-PB.

== Club career ==
Born in Recife, Thallyson joined the youth academy of Sport Club do Recife in 2014 after having passed through the youth setup of Paraná Clube. At the beginning of the 2017 season, he was promoted to the senior team and made his debut in Campeonato Pernambucano, playing the whole ninety minutes of a 0–0 draw against Salgueiro Atlético Clube.

On 5 August 2017, he scored his first goal for the club in a 3–1 defeat against Sport Club Corinthians Paulista. Three days later, his contract was extended till December 2020. On 4 April 2018, he was loaned out to second tier Boa Esporte Clube till the end of the season.

== Career statistics ==
As of match played on 13 May 2018

Club	Season	League			State League		Cup		Continental		Total	
Club	Season	Division	Apps	Goals	Apps	Goals	Apps	Goals	Apps	Goals	Apps	Goals
Sport Recife	2017	Série A	15	1	6	0	3	1	2 (Note: Appearances in Copa Sudamericana)	0	26	2
Sport Recife	2018	Série A	0	0	5	0	1	0	0	0	6	0
Sport Recife	Total		15	1	11	0	4	1	2	0	32	2
Boa (loan)	2018	Série B	1	0	0	0	0	0	—		1	0
Career total			16	1	11	0	4	1	2	0	33	2
