= Reinaldo Lenis =

Colombian footballer (born 1992)

Personal information
- Full name: Reinaldo Lenis Montes
- Date of birth: 20 July 1992 (age 34)
- Place of birth: Cali, Colombia
- Height: 1.80 m (5 ft 11 in)
- Position: Winger

Youth career
- 2013: Argentinos Juniors

Senior career*
Years	Team	Apps	(Gls)
2013–2015	Argentinos Juniors	60	(6)
2016–2018	Sport Recife	34	(2)
2018	→ Atlético Nacional (loan)	18	(1)
2019–2020	Banfield	20	(4)
2020–2021	Universidad de Chile	9	(3)
2021–2022	Ionikos	25	(4)
2022–2023	Al-Adalah	23	(3)
- * Club domestic league appearances and goals as of 27 May 2023

Reinaldo Lenis Montes (born 20 July 1992) is a Colombian professional footballer who plays as a winger.

== Career ==
In November 2020, Lenis moved to Chile and joined Universidad de Chile.

On 19 June 2022, Lenis joined Saudi Pro League club Al-Adalah.

== Honours ==
Sport Recife

- Ariano Suassuna Trophy: 2016, 2017, 2018
- Campeonato Pernambucano: 2017
