= Rogério (footballer, born 1990) =

Brazilian footballer

Personal information
- Full name: José Rogério de Oliveira
- Date of birth: 24 December 1990 (age 35)
- Place of birth: Pesqueira, Brazil
- Height: 1.72 m (5 ft 8 in)
- Positions: Forward; winger

Team information
- Current team: CEOV Operário

Youth career
- 2006: Pesqueira Futebol Clube
- 2007–2008: Porto-PE

Senior career*
Years	Team	Apps	(Gls)
2009–2010	Porto-PE		
2010	→ Central (loan)	4	(0)
2011–2015	Náutico	75	(9)
2014	→ Al Dhafra (loan)	8	(2)
2014	→ Botafogo (loan)	17	(2)
2015	→ Vitória (loan)	14	(5)
2015–2017	São Paulo	19	(5)
2016–2017	→ Sport Recife (loan)	26	(8)
2017–2018	Sport Recife	55	(5)
2019–	Bahia	26	(2)
2020	→ Ceará (loan)	8	(0)
2020	→ Sport Recife (loan)	7	(0)
2020–2021	→ Juventude (loan)	8	(2)
2021	→ Ferroviária (loan)	12	(2)
2021	UNAM	38	(9)
2022	CSA	11	(0)
2023	Remo	4	(0)
2023–	CEOV Operário	0	(0)
- * Club domestic league appearances and goals as of 03:55, 9 May 2022 (UTC)

José Rogério de Oliveira (born 24 December 1990), known as Rogério, is a Brazilian professional footballer who plays as a forward or winger for CEOV Operário.

== Honours ==
Náutico

- Copa Pernambuco: 2011

Sport Recife

- Campeonato Pernambucano: 2017

Bahia

- Campeonato Baiano: 2019
