= Francisco Rithely =

Brazilian footballer (born 1991)

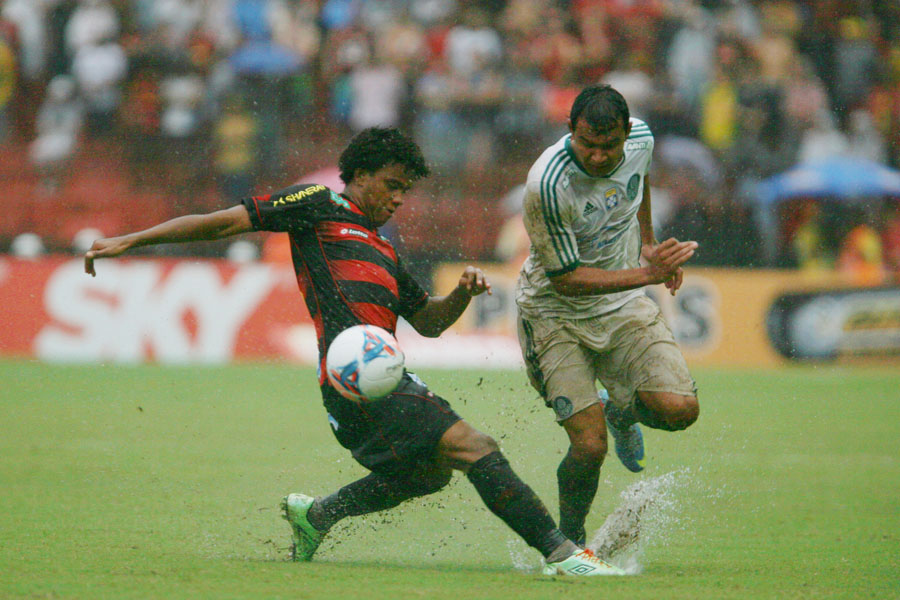
- Francisco Rithely da Silva Sousa

Personal information
- Full name: Francisco Rithely da Silva Sousa
- Date of birth: 27 January 1991 (age 35)
- Place of birth: Maranhão, Brazil
- Height: 1.74 m (5 ft 9 in)
- Position: Midfielder

Youth career
- Goiás

Senior career*
Years	Team	Apps	(Gls)
2009–2011	Goiás	28	(3)
2011–2020	Sport Recife	360	(31)
2019	→ Internacional (loan)	16	(0)
2020–2021	Atlético Goianiense	5	(2)
2022	Azuriz	7	(0)
2022	Ponte Preta	5	(0)
2023	Paysandu	5	(0)
- * Club domestic league appearances and goals as of 29 March 2023

Francisco Rithely da Silva Sousa (born 27 January 1991) is a Brazilian professional footballer who plays as a midfielder.

== Career ==
=== Goiás ===
In August 2010, Rithely started his professional career in August 2010 at Goiás.

=== Sport Recife ===
On 20 May 2011, he moved to Sport Recife on a free transfer.

He was chosen best defensive midfielder in the 2013 Campeonato Pernambucano.

== Career statistics ==
As of 13 December 2019

Appearances and goals by club, season and competition
Club	Season	League			Cup		Continental		Other		Total	
Club	Season	Division	Apps	Goals	Apps	Goals	Apps	Goals	Apps	Goals	Apps	Goals
Goiás	2009	Série A	5	1							5	1
Goiás	2010	Série A	9	0	5	1	1 (Note: Appearance(s) in Copa Sudamericana)	0			15	1
Goiás	2010	Série A							8 (Note: Appearance(s) in Campeonato Goiano)	0	8	0
Goiás	Total		14	1	5	1	1	0	8	0	28	2
Sport Recife	2011	Série B	26	1							26	1
Sport Recife	2012	Série A	33	3					2 (Note: Appearance(s) in Campeonato Pernambucano)	0	35	3
Sport Recife	2013	Série B	34	5	2	1	3	0	19 (Note: Twelve appearances and one goal in Campeonato Pernambucano, seven appearances in Copa do Nordeste)	1	58	7
Sport Recife	2014	Série A	35	2	2	0	2	1	14 (Note: Five appearances in Campeonato Pernambucano, nine appearances and one goal in Copa do Nordeste)	1	53	4
Sport Recife	2015	Série A	35	1	6	1	3	1	18 (Note: Nine appearances and one goal in Campeonato Pernambucano, nine appearances and two goals in Copa do Nordeste)	2	60	5
Sport Recife	2016	Série A	33	2			2	0	21 (Note: Thirteen appearances in Campeonato Pernambucano, eight appearances and one goal in Copa do Nordeste)	2	56	4
Sport Recife	2017	Série A	32	1	5	2	5	2	15 (Note: Seven appearances in Campeonato Pernambucano, eight appearances and one goal in Copa do Nordeste)	1	57	6
Sport Recife	2018	Série B			1	0			1	0	2	0
Sport Recife	Total		228	15	16	4	15	4	90	7	347	30
Internacional (loan)	2019	Série A	8	0	0	0	1 (Note: Appearance(s) in Copa Libertadores)	0	7 (Note: Appearance(s) in Campeonato Gaúcho)	0	16	0
Career total			250	16	21	5	17	4	105	7	391	32

== Honours ==
Goiás

- Campeonato Goiano: 2011

Sport Recife

- Copa do Nordeste: 2014
- Campeonato Pernambucano: 2014

Atlético Goianiense

- Campeonato Goiano: 2020
