= 2023 Campeonato Roraimense =

Campeonato Roraimense
- Season: 2023
- Champions: São Raimundo
- Série D: São Raimundo
- Copa do Brasil: São Raimundo; GAS
- Copa Verde: São Raimundo
- Matches: 42
- Goals: 159 (3.79 per match)

The 2023 Campeonato Roraimense was the 64th edition of Roraima's top professional football league. The competition started on 12 March and ended on 24 May. São Raimundo won the championship for the 14th time.

== Participating teams ==
Locations of the 2023 Campeonato Roraimense teams

Club	Home City	2022 Result
Atlético Roraima Clube	Boa Vista	5th
Baré Esporte Clube	Boa Vista	4th
Grêmio Atlético Sampaio (GAS)	Boa Vista	Not played
Náutico Futebol Clube	Boa Vista	3rd
Atlético Progresso Clube	Mucajaí	Not played
Associação Esportiva Real	São Luiz do Anauá	2nd
Atlético Rio Negro Clube	Boa Vista	6th
River Esporte Clube	Boa Vista	Not played
São Raimundo Esporte Clube	Boa Vista	1st

== First round ==
=== Group stage ===
==== Group A ====
Pos	Team	Pld	W	D	L	GF	GA	GD	Pts	Qualification or relegation
1	GAS (A)	4	4	0	0	18	6	+12	12	Advance to the Final stage
2	Náutico (A)	4	2	1	1	11	6	+5	7	Advance to the Final stage
3	Baré	4	1	2	1	5	6	−1	5	
4	Atlético Roraima	4	1	0	3	8	10	−2	3	
5	Rio Negro	4	0	1	3	1	15	−14	1	

Source: Globo Esporte
(A) Advance to a further round

==== Group B ====
Pos	Team	Pld	W	D	L	GF	GA	GD	Pts	Qualification or relegation
1	São Raimundo (A)	3	2	1	0	10	1	+9	7	Advance to the Final stage
2	Real (A)	3	2	1	0	4	1	+3	7	Advance to the Final stage
3	River	3	1	0	2	5	8	−3	3	
4	Progresso	3	0	0	3	1	10	−9	0	

Source: Globo Esporte
(A) Advance to a further round

=== Final stage ===
==== Semi-final ====
Team 1	Score	Team 2
GAS	3–2	Real
São Raimundo	1–0	Náutico

==== Final ====
Team 1	Score	Team 2
GAS	0–2	São Raimundo

== Second round ==
=== Group stage ===
==== Group A ====
Pos	Team	Pld	W	D	L	GF	GA	GD	Pts	Qualification or relegation
1	GAS (A)	4	2	1	1	6	3	+3	7	Advance to the Final stage
2	Atlético Roraima (A)	4	2	1	1	4	4	0	7	Advance to the Final stage
3	Náutico	4	2	1	1	14	12	+2	7	
4	Rio Negro	4	1	1	2	6	12	−6	4	
5	Baré	4	1	0	3	4	9	−5	3	

Source: Globo Esporte
(A) Advance to a further round

==== Group B ====
Pos	Team	Pld	W	D	L	GF	GA	GD	Pts	Qualification or relegation
1	São Raimundo (A)	5	4	1	0	13	0	+13	13	Advance to the Final stage
2	Real (A)	5	3	2	0	14	5	+9	11	Advance to the Final stage
3	River	5	1	0	4	5	13	−8	3	
4	Progresso	5	0	1	4	8	16	−8	1	

Source: Globo Esporte
(A) Advance to a further round

=== Final stage ===
==== Semi-final ====
Team 1	Score	Team 2
GAS	2–2 (1–4 p)	Real
São Raimundo	4–2	Atlético Roraima

==== Final ====
Team 1	Score	Team 2
Real	2–2 (2–4 p)	São Raimundo
