= 2011 Campeonato Roraimense =

Campeonato Roraimense
- Season: 2011
- Champions: Real-RR
- Relegated: (no relegation)
- Copa do Brasil: Real-RR
- Série D: all teams withdrew

The 2011 Campeonato Roraimense was the 17th season of Roraima's top professional football league. The competition began 2 April and ended 21 May. Baré was the defending champion, but did not participate due to financial issues.

== Format ==
Six clubs were divided into two groups that played in two tournaments. In both tournaments the teams played a single round robin. The group winners qualified for the final. The winner of both tournaments played for the state championship. If the same team had won both tournaments, they would have been automatically declared the champion.

=== Qualifications ===
The champion qualified for 2012 Copa do Brasil and 2011 Campeonato Brasileiro Série D

== Participating teams ==
Club	Home city
Atlético Roraima	Boa Vista
GAS	Boa Vista
Náutico (RR)	Boa Vista
Real (RR)	São Luiz do Anauá
Rio Negro (RR)	Boa Vista
São Raimundo (RR)	Boa Vista

All games expect Rio Negro vs Náutico were played in Ribeirão, Boa Vista

== First tournament ==
=== Group stage ===
==== Group A standings ====
Pos	Team	Pld	W	D	L	GF	GA	GD	Pts
1	Real-RR	2	1	1	0	5	4	+1	4
2	Atlético Roraima	2	1	1	0	6	4	+2	4
3	Rio Negro-RR	2	0	0	2	2	5	−3	0

Real qualified due to having less red cards than Atlético Roraima (0–2).

==== Group B standings ====
Pos	Team	Pld	W	D	L	GF	GA	GD	Pts
1	Náutico-RR	2	1	1	0	5	2	+3	4
2	São Raimundo-RR	2	0	2	0	2	2	0	2
3	GAS	2	0	1	1	2	5	−3	1

=== Final stage ===
23 April 2011
18h30

Real	1-0	Náutico
Ivan Mota 10'

Ribeirão, Boa Vista
Referee: José Ordílio (RR)

== Second tournament ==
Pos	Team	Pld	W	D	L	GF	GA	GD	Pts
1	Real-RR	5	3	1	1	9	5	+4	10
2	São Raimundo (RR)	5	3	1	1	8	5	+3	10
3	Atlético Roraima	5	1	4	0	8	7	+1	7
4	Náutico-RR	5	1	2	2	10	11	−1	5
5	Rio Negro-RR	5	1	1	3	8	10	−2	4
6	GAS	5	1	1	3	5	10	−5	4

Real won both stages.

== Overall standings ==
Pos	Team	Pld	W	D	L	GF	GA	GD	Pts	Qualification
1	Real-RR (C)	8	5	2	1	15	9	+6	17	2012 Copa do Brasil
2	São Raimundo (RR)	8	3	3	2	10	8	+2	12	
3	Atlético Roraima	7	2	5	0	14	11	+3	11	
4	Náutico-RR	7	2	3	2	15	13	+2	9	
5	GAS	7	1	2	4	7	15	−8	5	
6	Rio Negro-RR	7	1	1	5	10	15	−5	4	

(C) Champions
