= Miss Roraima =

Brazilian beauty pageant

Miss Roraima Miss Universe Roraima
- Formation: 1959 (as Miss Território do Rio Branco); 1962 (as Miss Roraima)
- Type: Beauty pageant
- Headquarters: Roraima, Brazil
- Members: Miss Brazil
- Official language: Portuguese
- State Director: Paulo Silas Valente

Miss Roraima is a Brazilian beauty pageant which selects the representative for the State of Roraima at the Miss Brazil contest. The pageant was created in 1959 and has been held every year since with the exception of 1960–1964, 1969–1970, 1976, 1990–1991, and 1993. The pageant is held annually with representation of several municipalities. Since 2017, the State director of Miss Roraima is Paulo Silas Valente. Roraima has yet to win any crowns in the national contest

== Gallery of Titleholders ==
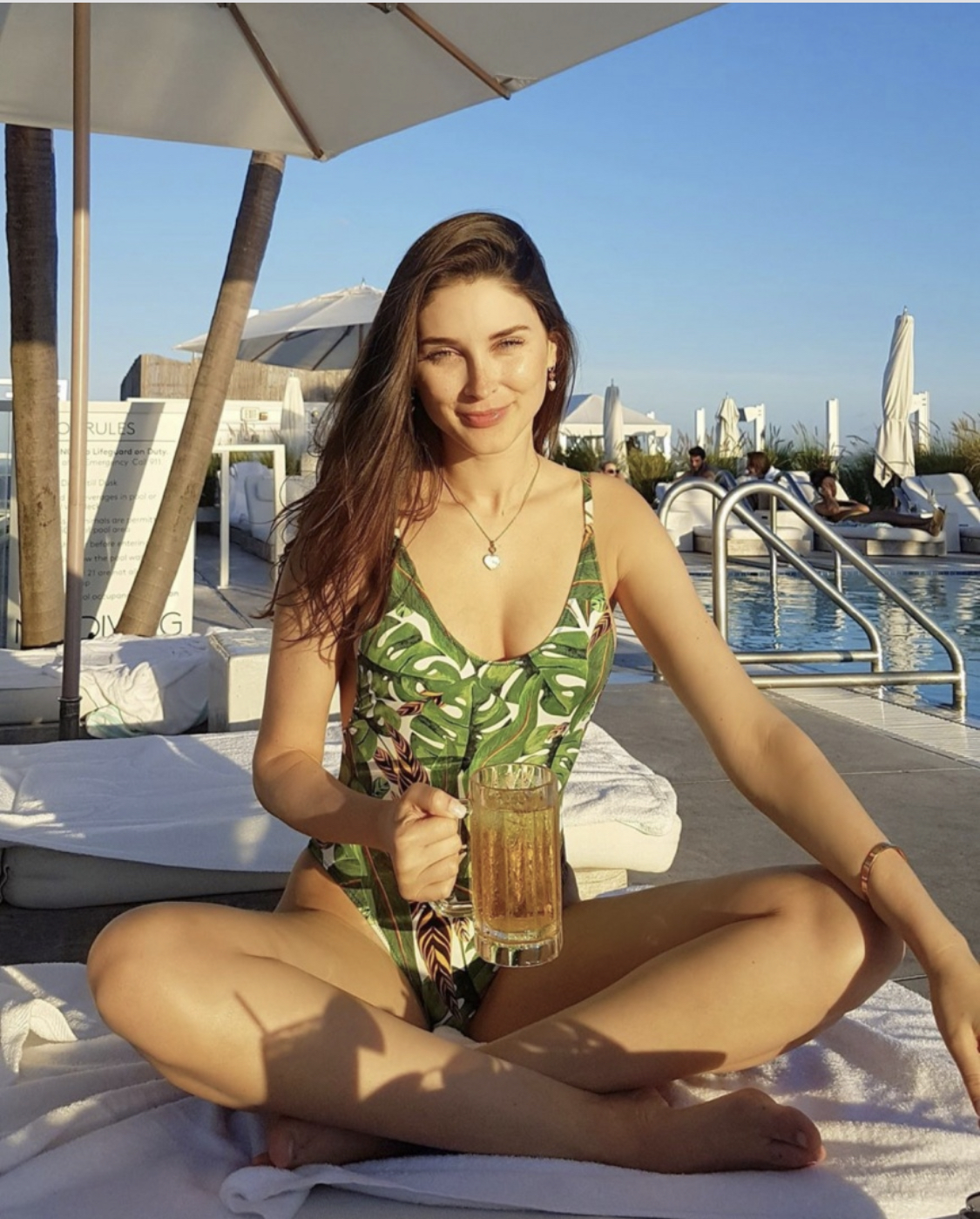
Miss Roraima 2013
Lillian Bianca Matte Patricio

== Results summary ==
=== Placements ===
- Miss Brazil:
- 1st Runner-Up: Aline Menezes (1996)
- 2nd Runner-Up:
- 3rd Runner-Up: Catarina de Lima Guerra (2004)
- 4th Runner-Up:
- Top 5/Top 8/Top 9:
- Top 10/Top 11/Top 12: Jéssica Pereira Barros (2021)
- Top 15/Top 16: Natali Vitória Lima da Silva (2019); Kalyana Machado Barros (2022)

=== Special awards ===
- Miss Photogenic: Janayna Chaves (1995)
- Best State Costume: Janaína Coelho (1997)

== Titleholders ==
=== Miss Roraima ===
Since 1962, the contest has been called Miss Roraima. There was no delegate in 1963-1964 but the contest returned in 1965 under its new name Miss Roraima.

Year	Name	Age (Note: Ages at the time of the pageant)	Height	Represented	Miss Brazil placement	Notes
Miss Universe Roraima
2025	No delegate sent in 2025.					
2024	Karol Falcão	24	1.75 m (5 ft 9 in)	Amajari		
2023	Manoela Figueira Salcides	23	1.70 m (5 ft 7 in)	Boa Vista		
2022	Kalyana Machado Barros	23	1.74 m (5 ft 8 1/2 in)	Caracaraí	Top 16	Previously crowned Miss Roraima Be Emotion 2020.
2021	Jéssica Pereira Barros	20	1.74 m (5 ft 8 1/2 in)	Amajari	Top 10	
U Miss Roraima 2020 and Miss Roraima Be Emotion 2020
2020	No national Miss Brazil contest due to the COVID-19 pandemic and change in the national franchise holder which caused the national titleholder to be appointed.					
2020	Kalyana Machado Barros	21	1.74 m (5 ft 8 1/2 in)	Boa Vista	Did not compete	Contest was cancelled due to the change in the national franchise holder and the COVID-19 pandemic, thus did not compete. Later crowned Miss Universe Roraima 2022. Last Miss Roraima Be Emotion
Miss Roraima Be Emotion
2019	Natali Vitória Lima da Silva	19	1.68 m (5 ft 6 in)	Pacaraima	Top 15	
2018	Marina Pimentel Ferreira	23	1.75 m (5 ft 9 in)	Boa Vista		
2017	Nathália Paiva Lago	26	1.73 m (5 ft 8 in)	Caracaraí		
2016	Iane Rodrigues Cardoso	23	1.72 m (5 ft 7 1/2 in)	Boa Vista		
2015	Melina Melo Gomes	23	1.68 m (5 ft 6 in)	Boa Vista		
Miss Roraima Universe
2014	Marina Gabriele Pasqualotto	23	1.80 m (5 ft 11 in)	Boa Vista		
2013	Lillian Bianca Matte Patricio	22	1.76 m (5 ft 9 1/2 in)	Boa Vista		
2012	Karoline Rodrigues da Silva	20	1.71 m (5 ft 7 1/2 in)	Boa Vista		
Miss Roraima
2011	Nel Anne Rodrigues de Sousa			Boa Vista		
2010	Moara Barbosa de Albuquerque			Boa Vista		
2009	Ana Luiza de Oliveira Pinto	18	1.79 m (5 ft 10 1/2 in)	Boa Vista		
2008	Emmylie Daniele Muniz Cruz			Boa Vista		
2007	Monnya Raquel Bezerra Leite			Boa Vista		
2006	Érika Vasconcelos Magalhães			Boa Vista		
2005	Taynná de Melo Batista			Boa Vista		
2004	Catarina de Lima Guerra			Boa Vista	3rd Runner-Up	
2003	Karla Patrícia Grizotti			Boa Vista		
2002	Mayara Rodrigues			Boa Vista		
2001	Carolina de Paula			Boa Vista		
2000	Rossiany Bantim			Boa Vista		
1999	Thelma Araújo			Boa Vista		
1998	Juliana Minotto			Boa Vista		
1997	Janaína Coelho			Boa Vista		
1996	Aline Menezes			Boa Vista	1st Runner-Up	
1995	Janayna Chaves			Boa Vista		
1994	Milena Lago			Boa Vista		
1993	No delegate sent in 1993 due to Miss Brazil 1993 being appointed rather than having a contest.					
1992	Kitty Siqueira			Miss Brazil Organization (Organização Miss Brasil)		The Amazonas State Government sponsored Kitty Siqueira of Manaus for Miss Brazil 1992 and she represented the state as Miss Roraima.
1991	No delegate sent in 1991.					
1990	No contest in 1990.					
1989	Alcinéia Arruda					
1988	Eliza Magalhães					
1987	Cleneide de Oliveira Nascimento			Ass. dos Fun. da Telaima		
1986	Mirna Rodrigues da Silva			Caracaraí		
1985	Nanete Simone Neuhaus					
1984	Rita de Cássia Magalhães			Ass. Atlética Banco de Roraima		
1983	Sílvia Macêdo Coelho					
1982	Madalena Gomes					
1981	Neusa Maria Paiva					
1980	Neuza Maria Mayer					
1979	Nássara Dias Fraxe			Iate Clube de Boa Vista		
1978	Consuelo Duarte Oliveira			Iate Clube de Boa Vista		
1977	Zara Xirly Lima Tavares			Iate Clube de Boa Vista		
1976	No delegate sent in 1976.					
1975	Maria de Jesus Magalhães			Boa Vista		
1974	Ceisther Pereira de Miranda			Lions Clube		
1973	Elaine Mary de Lima			Iate Clube de Boa Vista		
1972	Dacilda Amora Lobato			Roraima Atlético Clube		
1971	Joana Vita Moraes de Souza			Baré Esporte Clube		Joana Vita de Souza was presented by the local clubs: Baré, Boa Vista, Roraima and São Francisco.
1970	No delegate sent in 1969 & 1970.					
1969	No delegate sent in 1969 & 1970.					
1968	Ângela Maria Martins			Diários Associados		The candidates were invited to represent the then territory by the then President of Miss Brazil, at the time.
1967	Mariza da Costa Velho			Diários Associados		The candidates were invited to represent the then territory by the then President of Miss Brazil, at the time.
1966	Vilma Greco Chapuis			Diários Associados		The candidates were invited to represent the then territory by the then President of Miss Brazil, at the time.
1965	Ana Maria Rocha Collyer			Diários Associados		The candidates were invited to represent the then territory by the then President of Miss Brazil, at the time.
1964	No delegate sent in 1963 & 1964.					
1963	No delegate sent in 1963 & 1964.					

=== Miss Território do Rio Branco ===
From 1959 to 1962, the contest was called Miss Território do Rio Branco. There was only one delegate ever sent and it was in 1959.

Year	Name	Age (Note: Ages at the time of the pageant)	Height	Represented	Miss Brazil placement	Notes
Miss Território do Rio Branco
1962	No delegate sent between 1960 and 1962.					
1961	No delegate sent between 1960 and 1962.					
1960	No delegate sent between 1960 and 1962.					
1959	Fernanda Pinheiro de Paula			Território do Rio Branco		Competed as Miss Território do Rio Branco
1958	No delegate sent between 1954 and 1958 as the contest didn't exist until 1959.					
1957	No delegate sent between 1954 and 1958 as the contest didn't exist until 1959.					
1956	No delegate sent between 1954 and 1958 as the contest didn't exist until 1959.					
1955	No delegate sent between 1954 and 1958 as the contest didn't exist until 1959.					
1954	No delegate sent between 1954 and 1958 as the contest didn't exist until 1959.					
