= Daniel Lemos =

Brazilian footballer (born 1990)

Personal information
- Full name: Daniel Soares de Sousa Lemos
- Date of birth: 5 January 1990 (age 36)
- Place of birth: Sobradinho, Brazil
- Height: 1.76 m (5 ft 9 in)
- Position: Forward

Youth career
- ?–2008: Atlético Paranaense

Senior career*
| Years | Team | Apps | (Gls) |
| 2008–2009 | FC Ingolstadt 04 | 7 | (0) |
| 2010 | Operário | | |
| 2011 | Consadole Sapporo | 0 | (0) |
| 2012 | Portimonense | 2 | (0) |
| 2012–2013 | Planaltina | | |
| 2013 | FC Gifu | 3 | (0) |
| 2013–2014 | ReinMeer Aomori | 19 | (15) |
- * Club domestic league appearances and goals as of 3 March 2015

Daniel Soares de Sousa Lemos (born 5 January 1990), commonly known as Daniel Lemos, is a Brazilian professional footballer who plays as a forward.

== Career ==
=== 1. FC Ingolstadt ===
Lemos signed for FC Ingolstadt 04 on 1 July 2008, joining from Atlético Paranaense. He made his debut 24 August 2008 coming on as a 75th-minute substitute in Ingolstadt's 2–1 loss to RW Oberhausen.

=== Portimonense ===
Lemos signed for Segunda Liga side Portimonense SC on a free transfer from Consadole Sapporo on 1 January 2012. He made his debut on 4 February 2012 in the Taça de Portugal coming on in the 77th minute against SC Braga. He made his league debut on 12 February 2012 against Estoril, coming on in the 62nd minute.

=== FC Gifu ===
Lemos signed for FC Gifu on 17 February 2013 on a free transfer from Planaltina. He made his debut on 7 April 2013 against Kyoto Sanga FC, coming on as an 85th-minute substitute.

Lemos left FC Gifu on 25 July 2013.

=== ReinMeer Aomori ===
On 11 August 2013, Lemos signed for Japanese Regional Leagues side ReinMeer Aomori.

== Career statistics ==
Appearances and goals by club, season and competition
| Club | Season | League | | Cup | | Other | | Total | |
| Club | Season | Apps | Goals | Apps | Goals | Apps | Goals | Apps | Goals |
|---|---|---|---|---|---|---|---|---|---|
| FC Ingolstadt 04 | 2008-09 | 7 | 0 | 1 | 0 | 0 | 0 | 8 | 0 |
| Portimonense | 2011–12 | 2 | 0 | 1 | 0 | 0 | 0 | 3 | 0 |
| FC Gifu | 2013 | 3 | 0 | 0 | 0 | 0 | 0 | 3 | 0 |
| Career total | | 12 | 0 | 2 | 0 | 0 | 0 | 14 | 0 |
