= Campeonato Roraimense de Futebol Feminino =

Women's football league in Roraima, Brazil

- Founded: 2009
- Country: Brazil
- Confederation: FRF
- Promotion to: Brasileiro Série A3
- Current champions: Rio Negro (3rd title) (2025)
- Most championships: São Raimundo (10 titles)
- Current: 2026

The Campeonato Roraimense de Futebol Feminino is the women's football state championship of Roraima state, and is contested since 2009.

== List of champions ==
Following is the list with all recognized titles of Campeonato Roraimense Feminino:

Season	Champions	Runners-up
2009	São Raimundo (1)	Progresso
2010	Atlético Roraima (1)	São Raimundo
2011–2012	Not held	
2013	São Raimundo (2)	Atlético Roraima
2014	São Raimundo (3)	Atlético Roraima
2015	São Raimundo (4)	Atlético Roraima
2016	Not held	
2017	São Raimundo (5)	Atlético Roraima
2018	São Raimundo (6)	Atlético Roraima
2019	São Raimundo (7)	Atlético Roraima
2020	São Raimundo (8)	Atlético Roraima
2021	São Raimundo (9)	GAS
2022	São Raimundo (10)	Rio Negro
2023	Rio Negro (1)	São Raimundo
2024	Rio Negro (2)	São Raimundo
2025	Rio Negro (3)	São Raimundo

== Titles by team ==
Teams in bold stills active.

Rank	Club	Winners	Winning years
1	**São Raimundo**	10	2009, 2013, 2014, 2015, 2017, 2018, 2019, 2020, 2021, 2022
2	**Rio Negro**	3	2023, 2024, 2025
3	**Atlético Roraima**	1	2010
