= 1996 Campeonato Brasileiro Série C =

Campeonato Brasileiro Série C
- Season: 1996
- Champions: Vila Nova
- Promoted: Vila Nova; Botafogo-SP
- Biggest home win: CSA 7-0 Galícia (September 26, 1996)
- Biggest away win: Botafogo Sobradinho 0-4 Francana (September 4, 1996)
- Highest scoring: Avaí 7-2 Brasil de Pelotas (September 1, 1996)
- Longest unbeaten run: Vila Nova (14 matches)

The football (soccer) Campeonato Brasileiro Série C 1996, the third level of Brazilian National League, was played from August 27 to December 8, 1996. The competition had 58 clubs and two of them were promoted to Série B.

== Stages of the competition ==
=== First phase ===
==== Group 1 ====
Pos	Team	Pld	W	D	L	GF	GA	GD	Pts	Qualification
1	(Acre (state)) Rio Branco-AC	4	2	2	0	3	1	+2	8	Qualified for the second phase
2	(Rondônia) Ji-Paraná	4	1	1	2	7	6	+1	4	Qualified for the second phase
3	(Amazonas (Brazilian state)) São Raimundo	4	1	1	2	6	9	−3	4	

Source: rsssfbrasil.com

==== Group 2 ====
Pos	Team	Pld	W	D	L	GF	GA	GD	Pts	Qualification
1	(Amazonas (Brazilian state)) Nacional	4	3	1	0	8	3	+5	10	Qualified for the second phase
2	(Roraima) Baré	4	2	1	1	9	6	+3	7	Qualified for the second phase
3	(Roraima) GAS	4	0	0	4	4	12	−8	0	

Source: rsssfbrasil.com

==== Group 3 ====
Pos	Team	Pld	W	D	L	GF	GA	GD	Pts	Qualification
1	(Tocantins) Gurupi	4	2	1	1	7	6	+1	7	Qualified for the second phase
2	(Maranhão) Sampaio Corrêa	4	2	0	2	8	6	+2	6	Qualified for the second phase
3	(Tocantins) Kaburé	4	1	1	2	3	6	−3	4	

Source: rsssfbrasil.com

==== Group 4 ====
Pos	Team	Pld	W	D	L	GF	GA	GD	Pts	Qualification
1	(Ceará) Fortaleza	6	3	2	1	10	5	+5	11	Qualified for the second phase
2	(Ceará) Ferroviário	6	3	1	2	9	7	+2	10	Qualified for the second phase
3	(Piauí) Cori-Sabbá	6	3	1	2	7	7	0	10	
4	(Piauí) River	6	1	0	5	3	10	−7	3	

Source: rsssfbrasil.com

==== Group 5 ====
Pos	Team	Pld	W	D	L	GF	GA	GD	Pts	Qualification
1	(Rio Grande do Norte) Potiguar de Mossoró	2	1	0	1	3	3	0	3 (Note: Potiguar won the 1st place by a draw)	Qualified for the second phase
2	(Rio Grande do Norte) Pauferrense	2	1	0	1	3	3	0	3	Qualified for the second phase

Source: rsssfbrasil.com

==== Group 6 ====
Pos	Team	Pld	W	D	L	GF	GA	GD	Pts	Qualification
1	(Pernambuco) Porto	4	2	2	0	8	4	+4	8	Qualified for the second phase
2	(Bahia) Catuense	4	1	2	1	3	4	−1	5	Qualified for the second phase
3	(Sergipe) Confiança	4	0	2	2	4	7	−3	2	

Source: rsssfbrasil.com

==== Group 7 ====
Pos	Team	Pld	W	D	L	GF	GA	GD	Pts	Qualification
1	(Alagoas) CSA	6	5	0	1	14	4	+10	15	Qualified for the second phase
2	(Bahia) Fluminense de Feira	6	3	0	3	9	7	+2	9	Qualified for the second phase
3	(Sergipe) Itabaiana	6	2	1	3	6	10	−4	7	
4	(Bahia) Galícia	6	1	1	4	5	13	−8	4	

Source: rsssfbrasil.com

==== Group 8 ====
Pos	Team	Pld	W	D	L	GF	GA	GD	Pts	Qualification
1	(Mato Grosso do Sul) Operário-MS	4	2	2	0	5	2	+3	8	Qualified for the second phase
2	(Mato Grosso) Mixto	4	1	2	1	3	4	−1	5	Qualified for the second phase
3	(Mato Grosso do Sul) Comercial-MS	4	0	2	2	0	2	−2	2	

Source: rsssfbrasil.com

==== Group 9 ====
Pos	Team	Pld	W	D	L	GF	GA	GD	Pts	Qualification
1	(Goiás) Vila Nova	4	2	2	0	5	3	+2	8	Qualified for the second phase
2	(Minas Gerais) Uberlândia	4	1	1	2	6	5	+1	4	Qualified for the second phase
3	(Goiás) Anápolis	4	1	1	2	3	6	−3	4	

Source: rsssfbrasil.com

==== Group 10 ====
Pos	Team	Pld	W	D	L	GF	GA	GD	Pts	Qualification
1	(Federal District (Brazil)) Botafogo Sobradinho	6	3	2	1	6	5	+1	11	Qualified for the second phase
2	(São Paulo (state)) Francana	6	3	1	2	11	5	+6	10	Qualified for the second phase
3	(Minas Gerais) Uberaba	6	3	1	2	4	4	0	10	
4	(Federal District (Brazil)) Planaltina	6	0	2	4	3	10	−7	2	

Source: rsssfbrasil.com

==== Group 11 ====
Pos	Team	Pld	W	D	L	GF	GA	GD	Pts	Qualification
1	(Espírito Santo) Estrela do Norte	4	3	0	1	6	3	+3	9	Qualified for the second phase
2	(Espírito Santo) Colatina	4	2	0	2	3	4	−1	6	Qualified for the second phase
3	(Espírito Santo) Vitória-ES	4	1	0	3	3	5	−2	3	

Source: rsssfbrasil.com

==== Group 12 ====
Pos	Team	Pld	W	D	L	GF	GA	GD	Pts	Qualification
1	(São Paulo (state)) Rio Branco-SP	8	5	3	0	18	3	+15	18	Qualified for the second phase
2	(São Paulo (state)) Lousano Paulista	8	4	2	2	8	7	+1	14	Qualified for the second phase
3	(São Paulo (state)) Juventus	8	2	3	3	7	7	0	9	
4	(Minas Gerais) Tupi	8	2	2	4	4	11	−7	8	
5	(Rio de Janeiro (state)) Barra Mansa	8	1	2	5	4	13	−9	5	

Source: rsssfbrasil.com

==== Group 13 ====
Pos	Team	Pld	W	D	L	GF	GA	GD	Pts	Qualification
1	(São Paulo (state)) Botafogo-SP	8	4	3	1	15	5	+10	15	Qualified for the second phase
2	(São Paulo (state)) Corinthians de Presidente Prudente	8	4	0	4	13	17	−4	12	Qualified for the second phase
3	(São Paulo (state)) Comercial-SP	8	3	2	3	11	9	+2	11	
4	(Paraná (state)) União Bandeirante	8	2	4	2	7	7	0	10	
5	(Paraná (state)) Matsubara	8	1	3	4	11	19	−8	6	

Source: rsssfbrasil.com

==== Group 14 ====
Pos	Team	Pld	W	D	L	GF	GA	GD	Pts	Qualification
1	(São Paulo (state)) Atlético Soroacaba	6	3	2	1	10	6	+4	11	Qualified for the second phase
2	(Paraná (state)) Rio Branco-PR	6	2	3	1	10	8	+2	9	Qualified for the second phase
3	(Santa Catarina (state)) Jaraguá	6	2	3	1	7	6	+1	9	
4	(São Paulo (state)) Sãocarlense	6	0	2	4	2	9	−7	2	

Source: rsssfbrasil.com

==== Group 15 ====
Pos	Team	Pld	W	D	L	GF	GA	GD	Pts	Qualification
1	(Rio Grande do Sul) Caxias	6	3	1	2	9	5	+4	10	Qualified for the second phase
2	(Paraná (state)) Cascavel	6	3	0	3	9	8	+1	9	Qualified for the second phase
3	(Santa Catarina (state)) Chapecoense	6	3	0	3	6	9	−3	9	
4	(Rio Grande do Sul) São Luiz	6	2	1	3	8	10	−2	7	

Source: rsssfbrasil.com

==== Group 16 ====
Pos	Team	Pld	W	D	L	GF	GA	GD	Pts	Qualification
1	(Santa Catarina (state)) Figueirense	8	4	2	2	12	7	+5	14	Qualified for the second phase
2	(Santa Catarina (state)) Tubarão	8	4	1	3	12	12	0	13	Qualified for the second phase
3	(Rio Grande do Sul) Pelotas	8	3	3	2	16	12	+4	12	
4	(Santa Catarina (state)) Avaí	8	3	2	3	15	15	0	11	
5	(Rio Grande do Sul) Brasil de Pelotas	8	0	4	4	5	14	−9	4	

Source: rsssfbrasil.com

=== Second phase ===
Team 1	Agg.	Team 2	1st leg	2nd leg
Fluminense de Feira	2–1	Colatina	2–0	0–1
Gurupi	0–7	Vila Nova	0–3	0–4
Ji-Paraná	4–2	Baré	1–1	3–1
Nacional	3–2	Rio Branco-AC	2–0	1–2
Potiguar de Mossoró	5–2	Ferroviário	4–1	1–1
Fortaleza	2–4	Sampaio Corrêa	1–3	1–1
CSA	2–1	Catuense	1–1	1–0
Pauferrense	1–1(a)	Porto	1–1	0–0
Botafogo Sobradinho	2–3	Mixto	0–0	2–3
Operário-MS	4–8	Francana	2–2	2–6
Rio Branco-PR	6–2	Corinthians de Presidente Prudente	4–0	2–2
Lousano Paulista	2–2(a)	Figueirense	2–1	0–1
Tubarão	4–2	Caxias	1–1	3–1
Estrela do Norte	3–5	Rio Branco-SP	2–1	1–4
Atlético Sorocaba	2–2(p)	Cascavel	2–0	0–2
Botafogo-SP	4–1	Uberlândia	2–0	2–1

=== Round of 16 ===
Team 1	Agg.	Team 2	1st leg	2nd leg
Fluminense de Feira	1–5	Vila Nova	0–2	1–3
Ji-Paraná	1–2	Nacional	1–0	0–2
Potiguar de Mossoró	2–6	Sampaio Corrêa	2–1	0–5
Porto	3–1	CSA	3–1	0–0
Mixto	2–6	Francana	1–3	1–3
Rio Branco-PR	1–2	Figueirense	1–0	0–2
Tubarão	3–6	Rio Branco-SP	3–1	0–5
Botafogo-SP	3–1	Atlético Sorocaba	2–0	1–1

=== Quarterfinals ===
Team 1	Agg.	Team 2	1st leg	2nd leg
Nacional	0–4	Vila Nova	0–1	0–3
Sampaio Corrêa	5–5(a)	Porto	4–3	1–2
Francana	4–4(p)	Figueirense	3–1	1–3
Botafogo-SP	3–1	Rio Branco-SP	2–0	1–1

=== Semifinals ===
Team 1	Agg.	Team 2	1st leg	2nd leg
Porto	3–5	Vila Nova	0–0	3–5
Figueirense	2–3	Botafogo-SP	2–0	0–3

=== Finals ===
Team 1	Agg.	Team 2	1st leg	2nd leg
Vila Nova	3–1	Botafogo-SP	2–1	1–0

== Sources ==
- "Brazil Third Level 1996". rsssfbrasil.com. Archived from the original on 2020-01-05.
