= Boa Vista Airport =

Boa Vista Airport may refer to

- Boa Vista International Airport in Brazil near the town of Boa Vista
- Aristides Pereira International Airport or Rabil Airport in Cape Verde on the island of Boa Vista
