= Rio Branco Esporte Clube (Roraima) =

Rio Branco
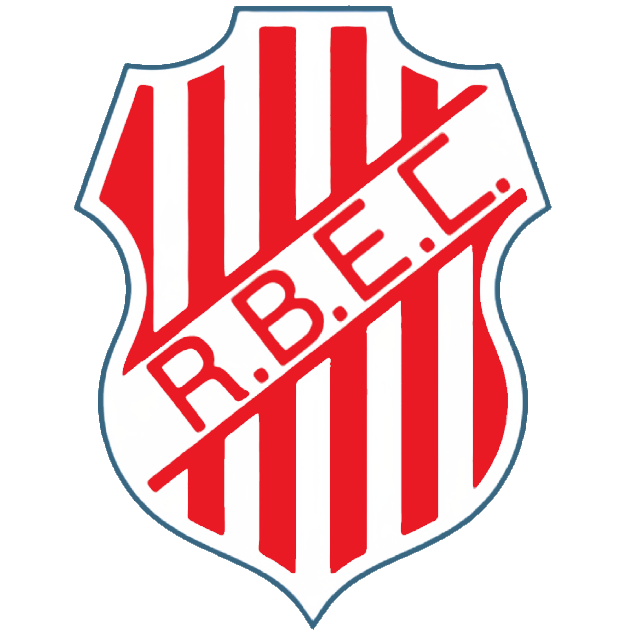
- Full name: Rio Branco Esporte Clube
- Nickname(s): Alvi-Rubro
- Founded: 24 July 1920; 104 years ago
- Dissolved: Unknown

Rio Branco Esporte Clube was a football club which was based in Boa Vista, Roraima. The club presently competed in the Campeonato Roraimense before their dissolution.

== History ==
Before the foundation of the state of Roraima, Rio Branco was based in Amazonas from 1920 to 1943. Rio Branco competed in the Campeonato de Boa Vista, which was a split from the Campeonato Amazonense. In 1943, the Federação Roraimense de Futebol was formed and the Campeonato de Boa Vista was now called Campeonato Roraimense and Rio Branco competed in it until their dissolution.

== Honours ==
- Campeonato Roraimense:
  - Winners (2): 1924 or 1925, 1952
