= Miquéias Fernandes =

Brazilian politician and physician (1950–2020)

City councilor of Manaus
- In office 1989–1991

Member of the Legislative Assembly of Amazonas
- In office 1991–2002

Personal details
- Born: August 28, 1950 Boa Vista, Roraima, Brazil
- Died: April 26, 2020 (aged 69) Manaus, Amazonas, Brazil
- Party: Democrats (Brazil) (PFL)
- Other political affiliations: Brazilian Democratic Movement (former); PST (former)
- Profession: Politician, lawyer, pastor

Miquéias Matias Fernandes (28 August 1950 – 26 April 2020), better known simply as Miquéias Fernandes, was a Brazilian Politician, Lawyer and Pastor from the State of Roraima who represented the State of Amazonas politically.

== Life ==
Born on 28 August 1950, in Boa Vista, Roraima, Fernandes was the son of Benjamin Matias Fernandes, a Pastor for Assemblies of God and Maria Fernandes, a Housewife. Before pursuing a career in politics, Fernandes worked as a Lawyer and also as a Pastor, just like his father.

In 1988, Fernandes was elected City councilor of Manaus. His tenure lasted from 1989 to 1991. In 1990, he was elected Member of the Legislative Assembly of Amazonas. He remained in power from 1991 to 1994.

In the 1994 elections, he was re-elected a State Deputy. His second tenure went from 1995 to 1998. In 1998, Fernandes was re-elected for his third and last term as a State Deputy. This time he remained from 1998 to 2002. After his last term as a State Deputy, Fernandes retired from politics and resumed practicing law and preaching at his church.

At the time of his death, Fernandes was married to Helen Fernandes and had three daughters and one son.

== Death ==
On 28 April 2020, Fernandes died in Manaus at the age of 69, due to complications brought on by COVID-19 during the COVID-19 pandemic in Brazil.
