= Náutico Futebol Clube =

Brazilian association football club based in Boa Vista, Roraima, Brazil

Náutico
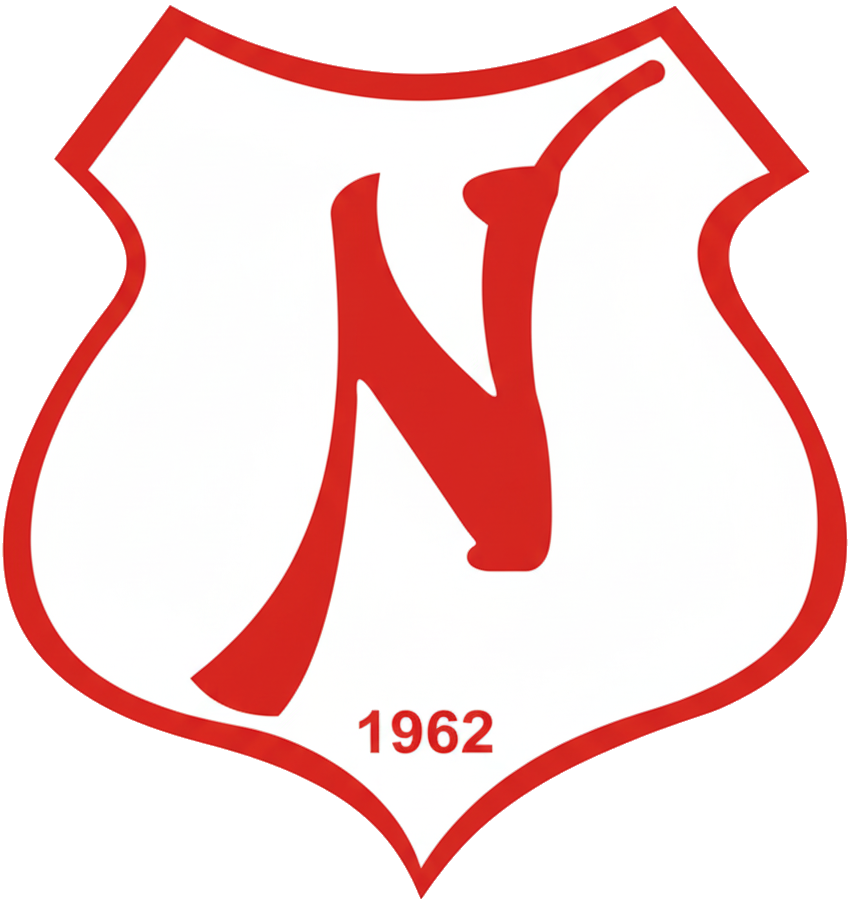
- Full name: Náutico Futebol Clube
- Nicknames: Clube Simpatia de Roraima (Roraima's Sympathy Club); Alvirrubro (White and Red)
- Founded: 22 December 1962; 63 years ago
- Ground: Estádio Canarinho
- Capacity: 4,556
- President: Androir Bassorici
- Head coach: Marinho
- League: Campeonato Roraimense
- 2025: Roraimense, 6th of 8
Home colors	Away colors

Náutico Futebol Clube, commonly referred to as Náutico de Roraima, Náutico-RR or simply Náutico is a Brazilian professional club based in Boa Vista, Roraima founded on 22 December 1962. It competes in the Campeonato Roraimense, the top flight of the Roraima state football league.

== History ==
The club was founded on 22 December 1962. Náutico finished as runners-up in the Campeonato Roraimense in 2010, and one of its players, Robemar Silva de Moura, was the join top goal scorer of the competition. They competed in the Série D in 2012, when they were eliminated in the First Stage of the competition. Náutico won the Campeonato Roraimense after beating São Raimundo in the final. The club is competing in the 2013 Série D.

== Honours ==
- Campeonato Roraimense
  - Winners (3): 1967, 2013, 2015
  - Runners-up (9): 1982, 1983, 1986, 1989, 2010, 2012, 2014, 2021, 2022

== Stadium ==
Náutico Futebol Clube play their home games at Estádio Flamarion Vasconcelos, nicknamed Canarinho. The stadium has a maximum capacity of 6,000 people.
