= Bianca Matte =

Model

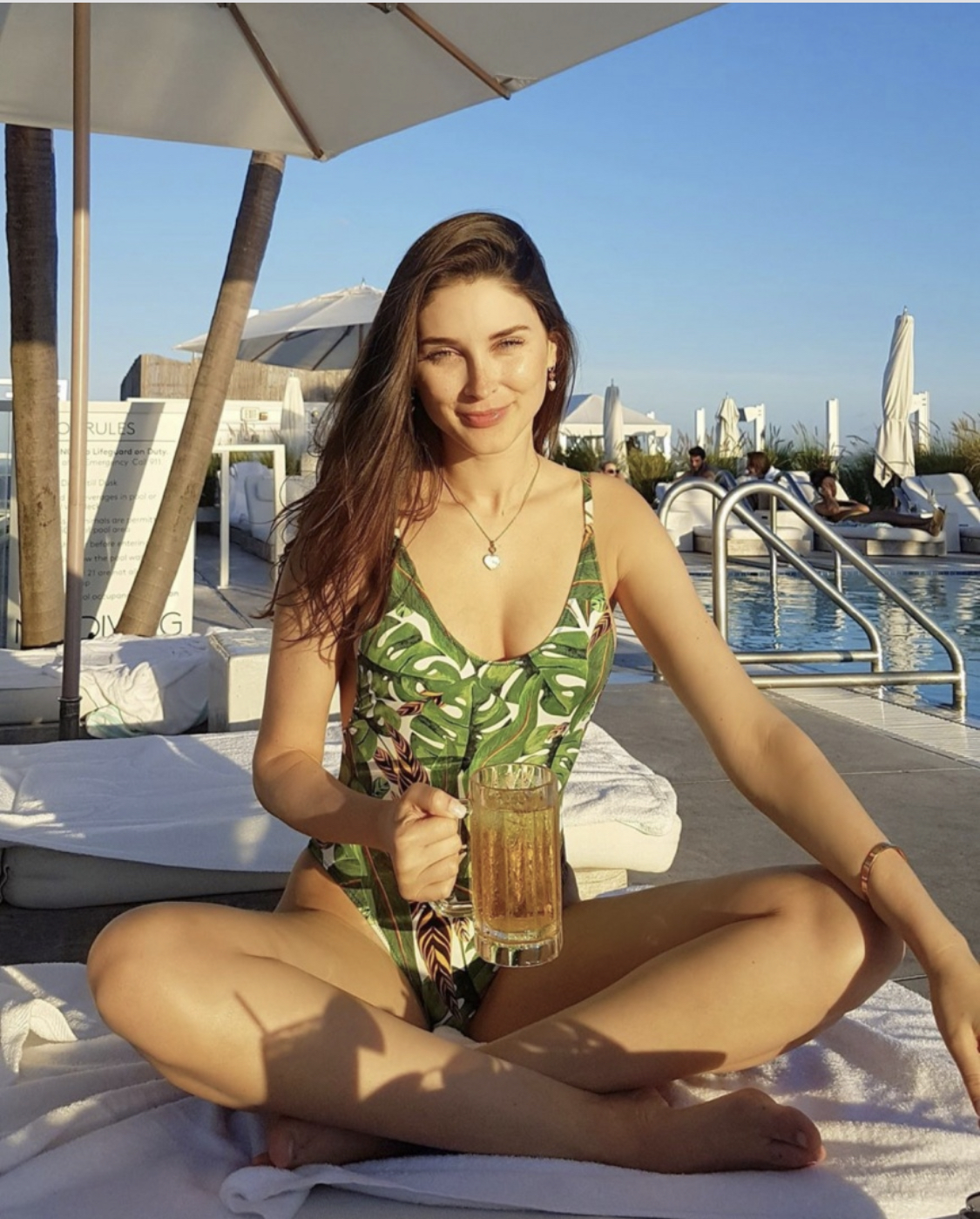
- Miss Roraima 2013
- Born: Lillian Bianca Matte Patricio; October 13, 1990 (age 35). Boa Vista, Roraima, Brazil
- Occupation: Model
- Height: 1.76 m (5 ft 9 1/2 in)
- Beauty pageant titleholder
- Hair color: Blonde
- Eye color: Green
- Major competitions: Miss Tourism Universe 2014 (2nd runner up); Miss Brasil 2013
- Website: Bianca Matte on Instagram

Bianca Matte (Roraima, October 13, 1990) is a Brazilian beauty queen and holder of the titles of Miss Roraima 2013 and Miss Brazilian Tourism 2014.

Bianca represented the state of Roraima at the Miss Brasil 2013, and was the winner of Miss Tourism Brazil Universe 2014 and 2nd runner-up at Miss Tourism Universe 2014, when she won the prize as the best costume of the night.

== Biography ==
Bianca Matte is a Brazilian model.

She worked as model in China and Turkey between 2010 and 2013.

She started to participate in beauty pageants in 2013, when she won Miss Roraima 2013. Months later, she represented her state at Miss Brasil 2013.

In November 21, 2014, she participated in Miss Tourism Universe, a beauty pageant that happened at Beirut, in Lebanon, and was the 2nd runner-up among other 27 contestants. The winner of Miss Tourism Universe 2014 was the Venezuelan Ninoska Vásquez
