= Augusto Ximeno de Villeroy =

Brazilian soldier and politician (1862 – 1942)

- In office January 4 – November 2, 1890
- Succeeded by: Eduardo Gonçalves Ribeiro

Personal details
- Born: March 22, 1862 Rio Grande do Sul
- Died: January 22, 1942 (aged 79)
- Profession: Soldier

Augusto Ximeno de Villeroy (Rio Grande do Sul, March 22, 1862 – Rio de Janeiro, January 22, 1942) was a Brazilian soldier and politician.

== Life ==
Born in the province of Rio Grande do Sul, he arrived in Manaus in 1890. Captain Ximeno de Villeroy was the first republican governor of Amazonas from January 4 to November 2, 1890, appointed by the provisional government of the Republic for Amazonas and who contributed with a personal history closely linked to the military-positivist high command.

He was the creator of the municipality of Boa Vista do Rio Branco (on July 9, 1890, by State Decree No. 49), currently Boa Vista, capital of Roraima, Brazil.
