= Sociedade Esportiva Pauferrense =

Pauferrense
- Full name: Sociedade Esportiva Pauferrense
- Nickname(s): Gavião do Oeste
- Founded: May 1, 1995
- Ground: Estádio Nove de Janeiro, Pau dos Ferros, Rio Grande do Norte state, Brazil
- Capacity: 2,000
Home colours	Away colours

Sociedade Esportiva Pauferrense, commonly known as Pauferrense, was a Brazilian football club based in Pau dos Ferros, Rio Grande do Norte state. They competed in the Série C once.

== History ==
The club was founded on May 1, 1995. They competed in the Série C in 1996, when they were eliminated in the Second Stage of the competition.

== Stadium ==
Sociedade Esportiva Pauferrense play their home games at Estádio Nove de Janeiro. The stadium has a maximum capacity of 2,000 people.
