= Boa Vista Air Force Base =

Air base of the Brazilian Air Force

- Base Aérea de Boa Vista
- Boa Vista, Roraima in Brazil

Site information
- Type: Air Force Base
- Code: ALA7
- Owner: Brazilian Air Force
- Controlled by: Brazilian Air Force
- Open to the public: No
- Website: www.fab.mil.br/organizacoes/mostra/36

Location
- Location in Brazil SBBV (Brazil)
- Coordinates: 02°50′29″N 060°41′32″W

Site history
- Built: 1973
- In use: 1984-present

Garrison information
- Current commander: Cel. Av. Newton de Abreu Fonseca Filho
- Occupants: 1st Squadron of the 3rd Aviation Group

Airfield information
- Identifiers: IATA: BVB, ICAO: SBBV, LID: RR0001
- Elevation: 84 metres (276 ft) AMSL
Runways
Direction	Length and surface
08/26	2,700 metres (8,858 ft) Asphalt

Base Aérea de Boa Vista – ALA7 (IATA: BVB, ICAO: SBBV) is a base of the Brazilian Air Force, located in Boa Vista, the capital of Roraima state, Brazil.

It shares some facilities with Atlas Brasil Cantanhede International Airport.

== History ==
Boa Vista Air Force Base was commissioned on 25 August 1984. It is the only Brazilian Air Force Base located in the Northern Hemisphere.

== Units ==
The following unit is based at Campo Grande Air Force Base:

- 1st Squadron of the 3rd Aviation Group (1°/3°GAv) Escorpião, using the A-29A & B Super Tucano.

== Access ==
The base is located 4 km from downtown Boa Vista.

== Gallery ==
This gallery displays aircraft that are or have been based at Campo Grande. The gallery is not comprehensive.

=== Present aircraft ===
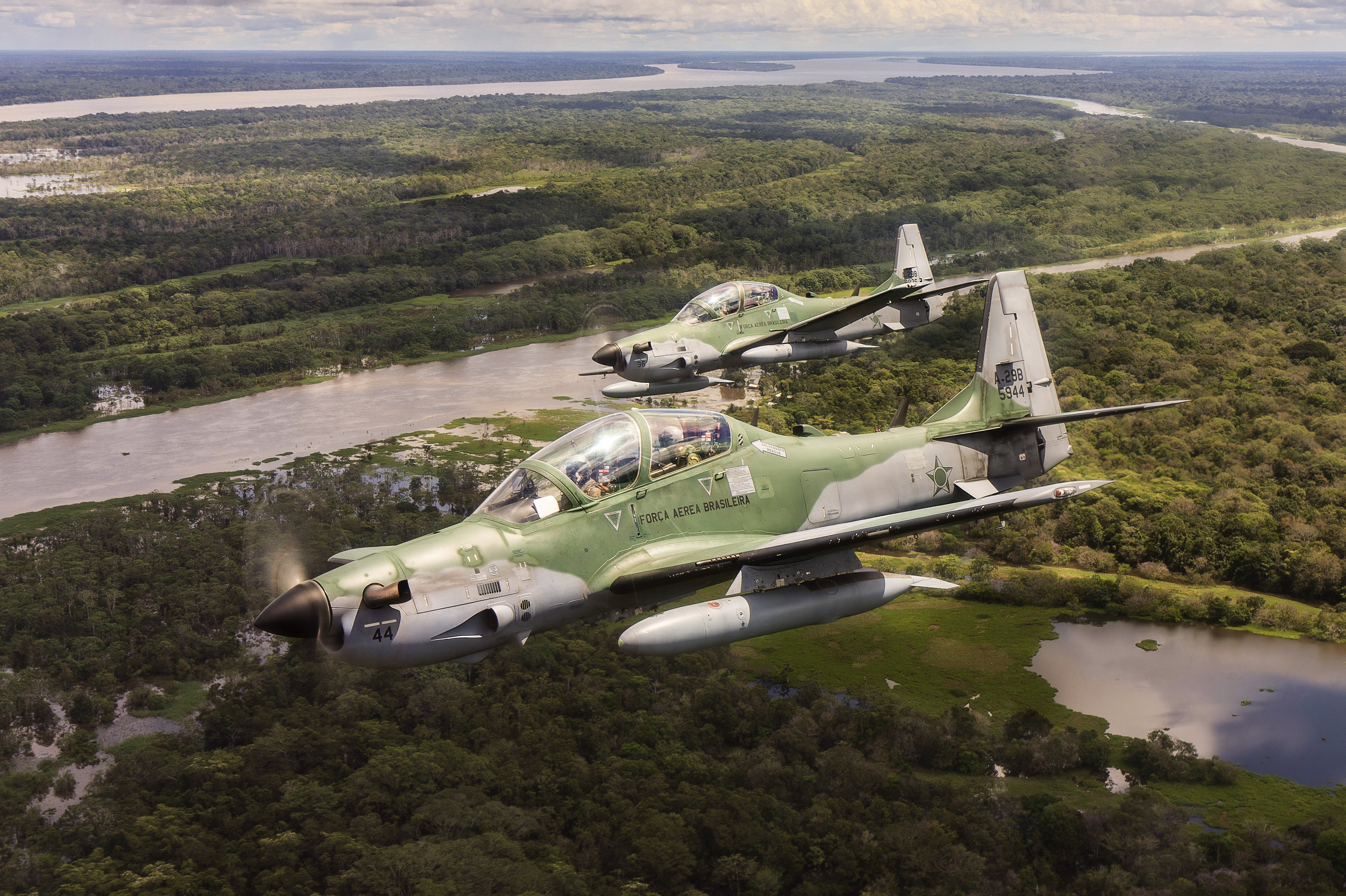
Embraer A-29A Super Tucano (FAB)

=== Retired aircraft ===
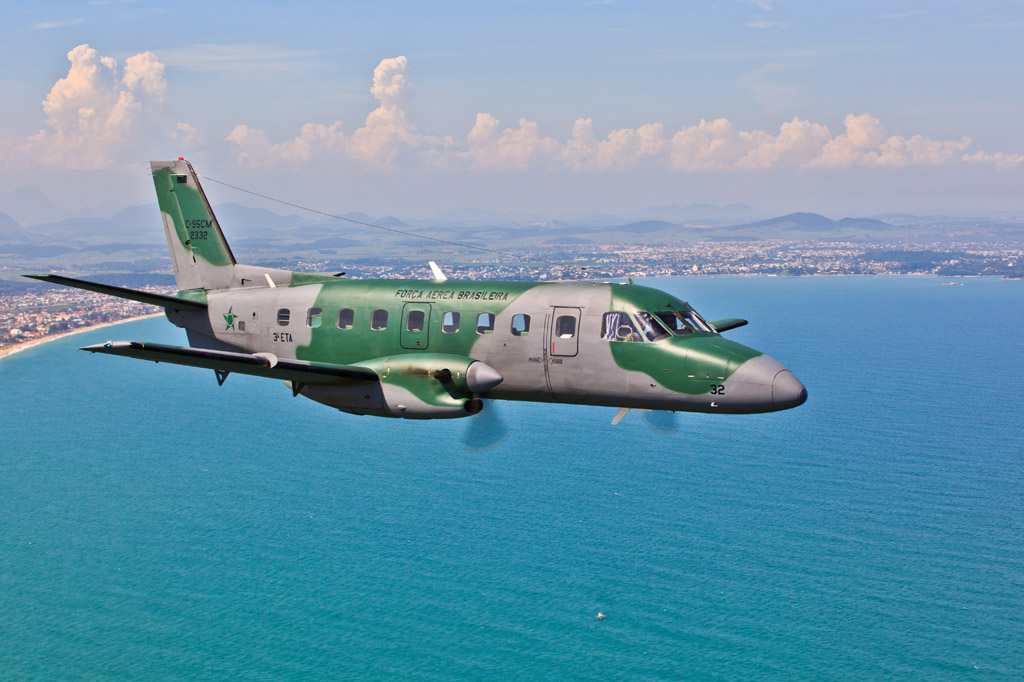
Embraer C-95B Bandeirante (FAB)

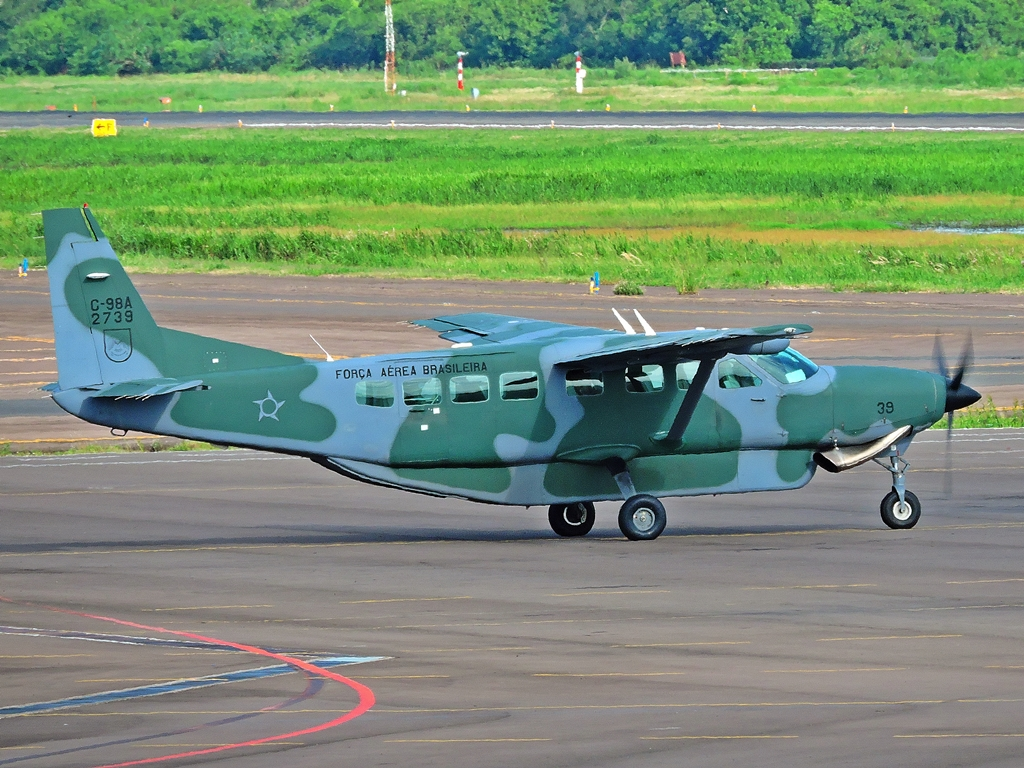
Cessna C-98A Caravan (FAB)

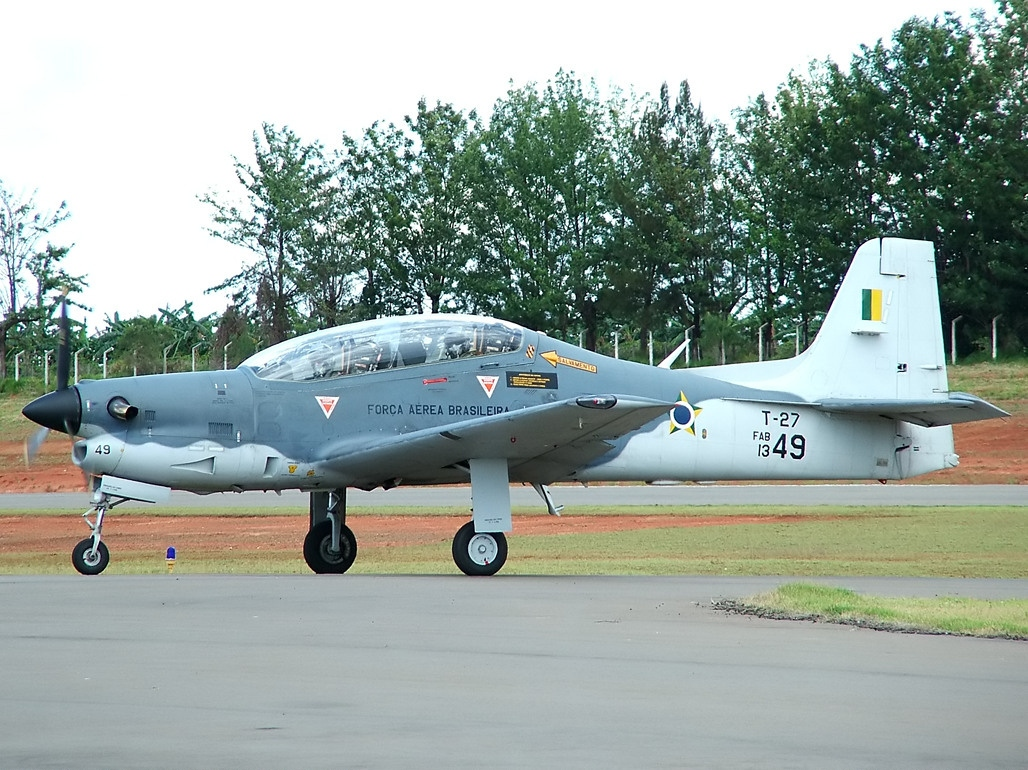
Embraer T-27 Tucano (FAB)

== See also ==
- List of Brazilian military bases
- Atlas Brasil Cantanhede International Airport
