= Baré Esporte Clube =

Baré
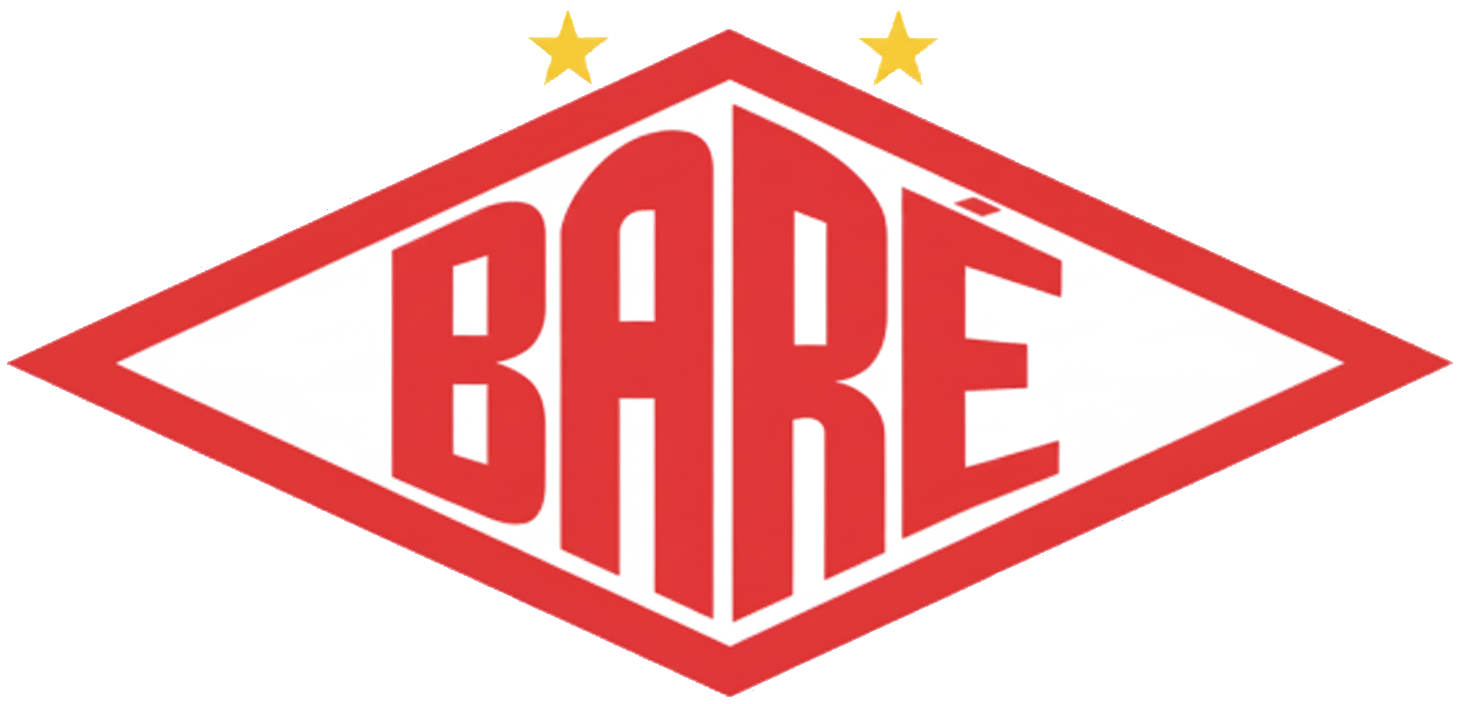
- Full name: Baré Esporte Clube
- Nicknames: Colorado da Consolata; Índio da Consolata; O Mais Querido
- Founded: October 26, 1946
- Ground: Flamarion Vasconcelos
- Capacity: 10,000
Home colours	Away colours

Baré Esporte Clube, usually known simply as Baré, is a Brazilian football club from Boa Vista, Roraima.

The club was founded in 1946. Home matches are played at Flamarion Vasconcelos Stadium, and the club colors are red and white. Baré competed in the Brazilian Championship Third Level several times.

Baré is the second-best ranked team from Roraima in CBF's national club ranking, behind São Raimundo.

== History ==
On October 26, 1946, Baré Esporte Clube was founded by Aquilino da Mota Duarte, Claudeonor Freire, Mário Abdala, Hitler de Lucena, Adamor Menezes, Simão Souza, Francisco Galvão Soares, Francisco das Chagas Duarte, Alcides da Conceição Lima Filho, Ruben da Silva Bento, José Maria Menezes Filho and Luciano Tavares de Araújo, who were dissatisfied members of Atlético Roraima Clube.

The club won its first title, which was the Campeonato Roraimense, in 1982. As an amateur club, the team also won the competition in 1984, 1986 and 1988. In 1983, Baré won its second title, the Torneio de Integração da Amazônia, beating Independência of Acre state in the final. The match was played in Rio Branco, capital city of Acre. In 1985, the club won again the competition, but the title was shared with Trem, of Amapá state.

The club competed in the Brazilian Championship Third Level for the first time in 1995, but was eliminated in the first stage by Progresso, of Mucajaí, Roraima. In 1996, as a professional football club, Baré won again the state championship, beating Sampaio in the final. The club also competed in the same year in the Brazilian Championship Third Level, where it reached the second stage, and was eliminated by Ji-Paraná, of Rondônia state.

In 1997 and in 1998, the club competed again in the Brazilian Championship Third Level, but was eliminated in both years in the first stage. In 2000, Baré competed in the Copa João Havelange, which was the competition that replaced the Brazilian Championship in that year. The club was in the green module (which was that season's equivalent to the third level), and was eliminated in the first stage.

== Honours ==
=== Regional ===
- Torneio de Integração da Amazônia
  - Winners (2): 1983, 1985

=== State ===
- Campeonato Roraimense
  - Winners (26): 1950, 1953, 1954 (shared), 1955, 1956, 1957, 1958, 1960, 1961, 1962, 1963, 1964, 1965, 1968, 1969, 1970, 1972 (shared), 1982, 1984, 1986, 1988, 1996, 1997, 1999, 2006, 2010

== First team ==
Note: Flags indicate national team as defined under FIFA eligibility rules; some limited exceptions apply. Players may hold more than one non-FIFA nationality.

No.	Pos.	Nation	Player
—	GK	BRA	Marquinhos
—	DF	BRA	Roney
—	DF	BRA	Fábio
—	DF	BRA	Everton
—	DF	BRA	Vitor
—	DF	BRA	Henrique

No.	Pos.	Nation	Player
—	MF	BRA	David
—	MF	BRA	Léo Cotia
—	MF	BRA	Cacau
—	FW	BRA	Pauinho
—	FW	BRA	Sadac

== Stadium ==
The club's home matches are usually played at Flamarion Vasconcelos stadium, nicknamed Canarinho which has a maximum capacity of 10,000 people.

== Clássico Bareima ==
The derby between Baré and Atlético Roraima Clube is known as Clássico Bareima. Bareima is the truncation of the clubs' names, Baré and Roraima.

== Club colors, mascot and nickname ==
Baré's official colors are red and white.

The club's mascot is a Native American.

Baré Esporte Clube is nicknamed Colorado da Consolata, meaning The Red of Consolata. Consolata refers to the avenue where the club is located in, Avenida Nossa Senhora da Consolata.
