= River Esporte Clube =

River
- Full name: River Esporte Clube
- Nickname: Auriverde da Aparecida
- Founded: July 19, 1973
- Ground: Canarinho, Boa Vista, Roraima, Roraima state, Brazil
- Capacity: 6,000
| Home colours | Away colours |

River Esporte Clube, commonly known as River, is a Brazilian football club based in Boa Vista, Roraima, Roraima state. They won the Campeonato Roraimense three times.

== History ==
The club was founded on December 22, 1962. River won the Campeonato Roraimense in 1979, 1989, and in 1994.

== Honours ==
- Campeonato Roraimense
  - Winners (3): 1979, 1989, 1994
- Campeonato Roraimense Amador
  - Winners (1): 1995

== Stadium ==
River Esporte Clube play their home games at Estádio Flamarion Vasconcelos. It is nicknamed the Canarinho, after the neighbourhood in which the stadium is located. The stadium has a maximum capacity of 6,000 people.
