= Planaltina Esporte Clube =

Brazilian football team from Planaltina, in Distrito Federal

Planaltina
- Full name: Planaltina Esporte Clube
- Founded: May 30, 1963
- Ground: Adonir Guimarães; Planaltina, DF,
- Capacity: 6,000
- Head coach: Jorge Medina
Home colors	Away colors

Planaltina Esporte Clube, commonly known as Planaltina, are a Brazilian football team from Planaltina, in Distrito Federal. They competed in the Série C once.

== History ==
The club was founded on May 30, 1963. Planaltina competed in the Série C in 1996, being eliminated in the First Stage of the competition.

== Stadium ==
Planaltina Esporte Clube play their home games at Estádio Adonir José Guimarães. The stadium has a maximum capacity of 6,000 people.
