= Boa Vista International Airport =

Boa Vista−Atlas Brasil Cantanhede International Airport Aeroporto International de Boa Vista−Atlas Brasil Cantanhede

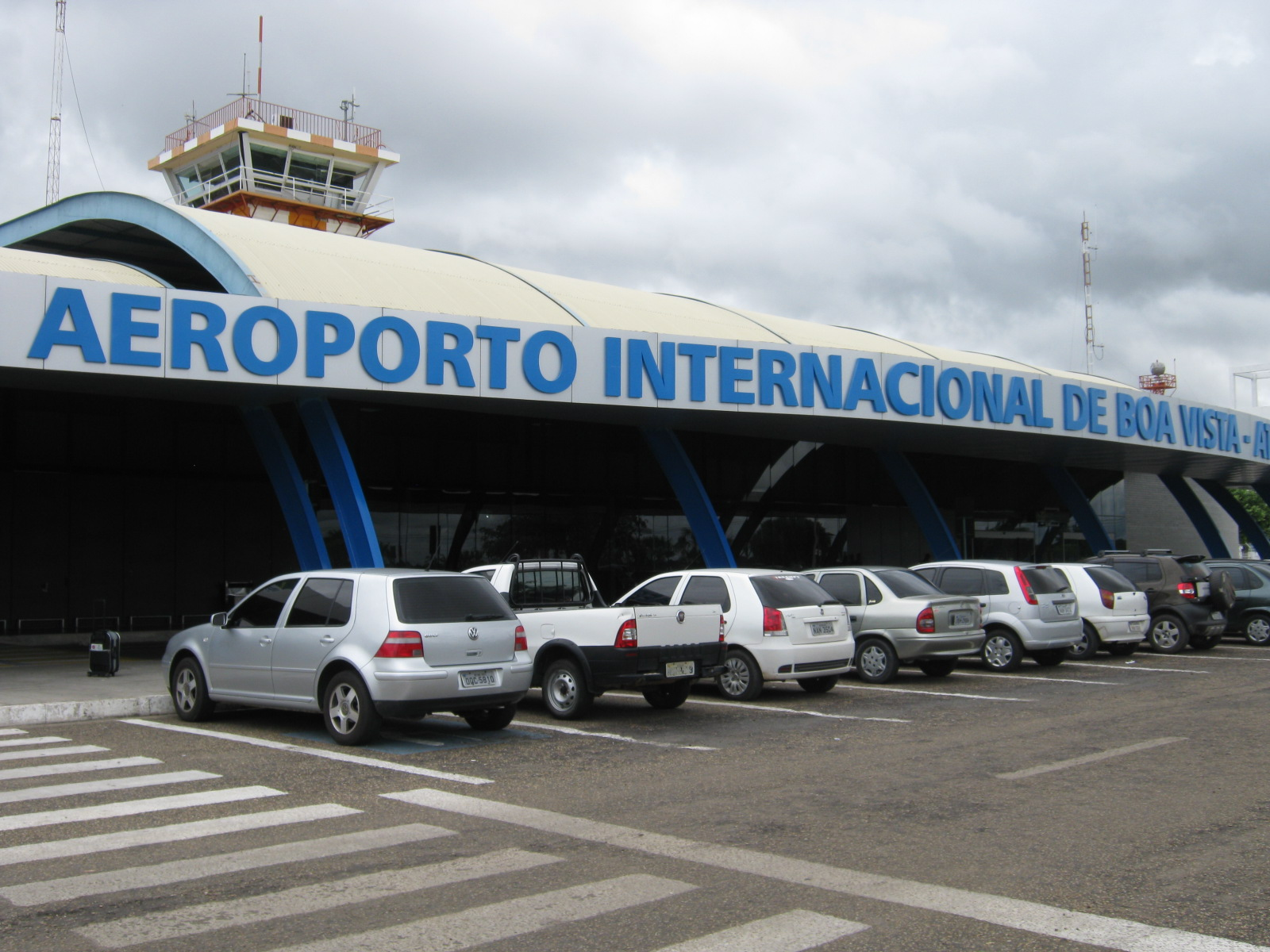
- IATA: BVB; ICAO: SBBV; LID: RR0001

Summary
- Airport type: Public
- Operator: Infraero (1974–2021); Vinci (2021–present)
- Serves: Boa Vista
- Opened: February 19, 1973; 53 years ago
- Time zone: BRT−1 (UTC−04:00)
- Elevation AMSL: 84 m (276 ft)
- Coordinates: 02°50′29″N 060°41′32″W
- Website: www.boavista-airport.com.br

Map
- Location in Brazil BVB (Brazil)

Runways
Direction	Length		Surface
Direction	m	ft	Surface
08/26	2,700	8,858	Asphalt

Statistics (2025)
- Passengers: 489,931 ▲18%
- Aircraft Operations: 13,023 ▼8%
- Statistics: Vinci; Sources: Airport Website, ANAC, DECEA

Boa Vista−Atlas Brasil Cantanhede International Airport (IATA: BVB, ICAO: SBBV) is the airport serving Boa Vista, the capital of Roraima state, Brazil. Since April 13, 2009, the airport is named after Atlas Brasil Cantanhede (1917-1973), a pilot and politician who in the 1950s pioneered aviation in Roraima state. It is the northernmost Brazilian airport served by scheduled flights.

It is operated by Vinci SA.

Some of its facilities are shared with Boa Vista Air Force Base of the Brazilian Air Force.

== History ==
The airport was opened on February 19, 1973, and underwent its first renovation in 1998. The runway, terminal and the apron were then enlarged. On September 14, 2009 a second major renovation was completed, increasing the capacity of the airport to handle 330,000 passengers/year, the terminal area to 7,000 square metres (75,300 sq ft), parking space and installing two jetways.

Previously operated by Infraero, on April 7, 2021, Vinci SA won a 30-year concession to operate the airport.

== Airlines and destinations ==
Airlines	Destinations
Azul Brazilian Airlines	Campinas, Manaus
Gol Linhas Aéreas	Brasília, Manaus (ends 29 January 2027)
LATAM Brasil	Brasília, São Paulo–Guarulhos

== Statistics ==
Following are the number of passenger, aircraft and cargo movements at the airport, according to Infraero (2007-2021) and Vinci (2022-2025) reports:

Year	Passenger	Aircraft	Cargo (t)
2025	489,931 ▲18%	13,023 ▼8%	
2024	416,201 ▲6%	14,161 ▼15%	
2023	394,128 ▲4%	16,611 ▲52%	
2022	380,106 ▲24%	10,902 ▲114%	
2021	307,604 ▲53%	5,102 ▼11%	1,425 ▲120%
2020	200,523 ▼43%	5,732 ▼6%	648 ▼54%
2019	349,916 ▲13%	6,125 ▲17%	1,418 ▲15%
2018	309,204 ▲9%	5,229 ▲5%	1,238 ▲73%
2017	283,699 ▼3%	4,982 ▼17%	716 ▲3%
2016	291,163 ▼16%	5,972 ▼32%	694 ▲2%
2015	347,592 ▼5%	8,816 ▲37%	681 ▲10%
2014	366,622 ▲1%	6,451 ▼2%	618 ▼11%
2013	362,902 ▲8%	6,589 ▼47%	698 ▼47%
2012	336,530 ▼2%	12,344 ▼8%	1,364 ▼16%
2011	341,885 ▲41%	13,490 ▲2%	1,624 ▲11%
2010	242,409 ▲27%	13,242 ▲19%	1,457 ▲12%
2009	190,469 ▼7%	11,133 ▲22%	1,303 ▼9%
2008	205,180 ▼3%	9,142 ▲19%	1,437 ▲22%
2007	211,319	7,701	1,176

== Access ==
The airport is located 4 km (2 mi) from downtown Boa Vista.

== See also ==
- List of airports in Brazil
- Boa Vista Air Force Base
