= Associação Esportiva Real =

Real
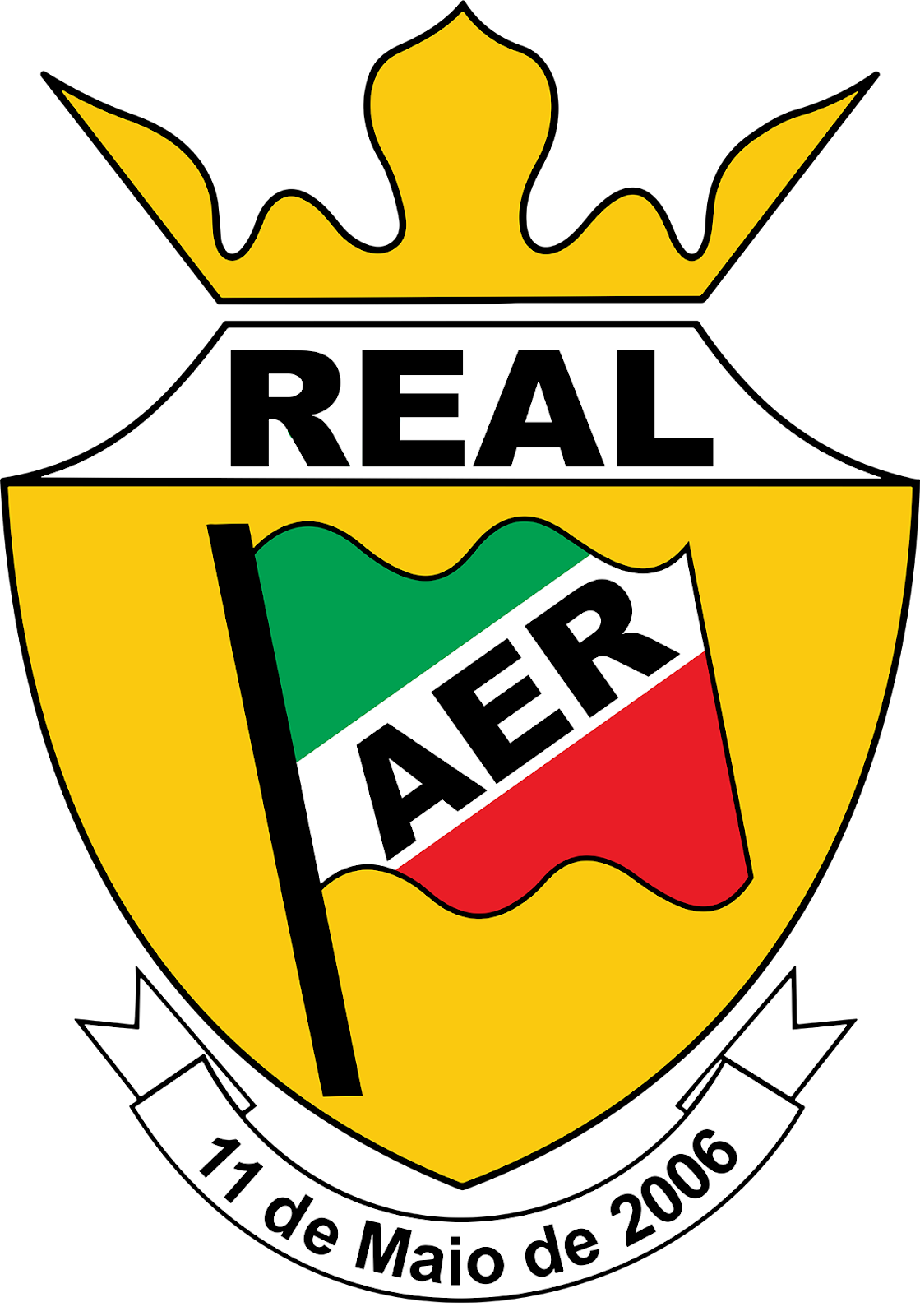
- Full name: Associação Esportiva Real
- Founded: May 11, 2006
- Ground: Estádio Municipal de São Luiz do Anauá, São Luiz do Anauá, Roraima state, Brazil
- Capacity: 3,000
Home colors	Away colors

Associação Esportiva Real, commonly known as Real, is a Brazilian football club based in São Luiz do Anauá, Roraima state. They have won the Campeonato Roraimense once.

== History ==
Real was founded on May 11, 2006, as depicted in the club's logo. After becoming a professional team in 2011, the club participated in that year's Campeonato Roraimense. They won the Campeonato Roraimense in 2011.

== Honours ==
- Campeonato Roraimense
  - Winners (1): 2011
  - Runners-up (1): 2022

== Stadium ==
Associação Esportiva Real play their home games at Estádio Municipal de São Luiz do Anauá. The stadium has a maximum capacity of 3,000 people.
