= São Luiz do Anauá =

Municipality of Roraima, Brazil

São Luiz São Luiz do Anauá
- Municipality
- Municipality of São Luiz
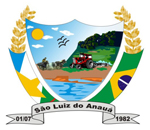
- Flag Coat of arms

- Location of São Luiz in the State of Roraima
- Coordinates: 1.0111°N 60.0452°W
- Country: Brazil
- Region: North
- State: Roraima

Government
  - Mayor: James Batista Moreira (PMDB)

Area
  - Total: 1,527 km^{2} (590 sq mi)

Population (2022)
  - Total: 7,315
  - Density: 4.790/km^{2} (12.41/sq mi)
- Time zone: UTC−4 (AMT)
- HDI (2000): 0.704 – medium
- Website: saoluiz.rr.gov.br

São Luiz or São Luiz do Anauá (Brazilian Portuguese pronunciation: [ˈsɐ̃w luˈiz du anɐˈwa]) is a municipality located in the southeast of the state of Roraima in Brazil. Its population is 7.315 and its area is 1,527 km^{2}, which makes it the smallest municipality in that state. São Luiz became an independent municipality in 1982. The municipality can be reached by the BR-210 highway.

== History ==
The municipality was born from the process of occupation and integration of the "Amazônia Legal" with the rest of the country. At this time, it was part of the municipality of Boa Vista, Roraima. São Luiz was elevated to the status of municipality by Federal Law No. 7,009, of July 1, 1982.

Its name is a tribute to the capital of Maranhão, due to the large number of Maranhense people in the place.

== Sports ==
The local football club is Associação Esportiva Real.
