= Atlético Rio Negro Clube (RR) =

Rio Negro
- Full name: Atlético Rio Negro Clube
- Nickname: Galo
- Founded: 26 April 1971; 54 years ago
- Ground: Canarinho, Boa Vista, Roraima, Roraima state, Brazil
- Capacity: 6,000
| Home colors | Away colors |

Atlético Rio Negro Clube, commonly known as Rio Negro, is a Brazilian football club based in Boa Vista, Roraima, Roraima state. They competed in the Copa do Brasil once.

== History ==
The club was founded on April 26, 1971. Rio Negro won the Campeonato Roraimense in 1991 and in 2000. They competed in the Copa do Brasil in 2001, when they were eliminated in the First Round by São Raimundo-AM.

== Honours ==
=== State ===
- Campeonato Roraimense
  - Winners (2): 1991, 2000
  - Runners-up (4): 1975, 1984, 1999, 2001

=== Women's Football ===
- Campeonato Roraimense de Futebol Feminino
  - Winners (3): 2023, 2024, 2025

== Stadium ==
Atlético Rio Negro Clube play their home games at Estádio Flamarion Vasconcelos, nicknamed Canarinho. The stadium has a maximum capacity of 6,000 people.
