= Radial plan =

City plan with a focal point

Map of the L'Enfant Plan in Washington, D.C., which uses a radial plan

A radial plan is a type of city plan where streets radiate from a center which serves as the focal point. Radial plans were most often used during the Renaissance and Baroque eras and fell out of fashion in the late 19th century. Examples of major cities that use a radial plan include Washington, D.C., Brasilia, and New Delhi.
