= Campeonato Roraimense =

Football league in Roraima, Brazil

- Organising body: FRF
- Founded: 1946; 80 years ago (as different amateur leagues); 1995; 31 years ago (as Campeonato Roraimense de Futebol)
- Country: Brazil
- State: Roraima
- Level on pyramid: 1
- Domestic cup: Copa do Brasil
- Current champions: GAS (3rd title) (2026)
- Most championships: Baré (26 titles)
- Website: FRF Official website

The Campeonato Roraimense is the top-flight professional state football league in the Brazilian state of Roraima. It is run by the Roraima Football Federation (FRF).

== List of champions ==
=== Amateur era ===
==== Federação Riobranquense de Desportos ====
Season	Champions
1946	Atlético Roraima (1)
1947	Unknown
1948	Atlético Roraima (2)
1949	Atlético Roraima (3)
1950	Baré (1)
1951	Atlético Roraima (4)
1952	Rio Branco (1)
1953	Baré (2)
1954	Atlético Roraima (5)
1954	Baré (3)
1955	Baré (4)
1956	Baré (5)
1957	Baré (6)
1958	Baré (7)
1959	Unknown
1960	Baré (8)
1961	Baré (9)

==== Federação Roraimense de Desportos ====
Season	Champions
1962	Baré (10)
1963	Baré (11)
1964	Baré (12)
1965	Baré (13)
1966	Unknown
1967	Náutico (1)
1968	Baré (14)
1969	Baré (15)
1970	Baré (16)
1971	Cancelled
1972	Atlético Roraima (6)
1972	Baré (17)
1973	Unknown

==== Federação Roraimense de Futebol ====
Season	Champions
1974	São Francisco (1)
1975	Atlético Roraima (7)
1976	Atlético Roraima (8)
1977	São Raimundo (1)
1978	Atlético Roraima (9)
1979	Ríver (1)
1980	Atlético Roraima (10)
1981	Atlético Roraima (11)
1982	Baré (18)
1983	Atlético Roraima (12)
1984	Baré (19)
1985	Atlético Roraima (13)
1986	Baré (20)
1987	Atlético Roraima (14)
1988	Baré (21)
1989	Ríver (2)
1990	Atlético Roraima (15)
1991	Rio Negro (1)
1992	São Raimundo (2)
1993	Atlético Roraima (16)
1994	Ríver (3)

=== Professional era ===
Season	Champions	Runners-up
1995	Atlético Roraima (17)	Baré
1996	Baré (22)	GAS
1997	Baré (23)	São Raimundo
1998	Atlético Roraima (18)	Baré
1999	Baré (24)	Rio Negro
2000	Rio Negro (2)	Atlético Roraima
2001	Atlético Roraima (19)	Rio Negro
2002	Atlético Roraima (20)	Baré
2003	Atlético Roraima (21)	São Raimundo
2004	São Raimundo (3)	Atlético Roraima
2005	São Raimundo (4)	Atlético Roraima
2006	Baré (25)	Atlético Roraima
2007	Atlético Roraima (22)	Baré
2008	Atlético Roraima (23)	Progresso
2009	Atlético Roraima (24)	São Raimundo
2010	Baré (26)	Náutico
2011	Real (1)	São Raimundo
2012	São Raimundo (5)	Náutico
2013	Náutico (2)	São Raimundo
2014	São Raimundo (6)	Náutico
2015	Náutico (3)	São Raimundo
2016	São Raimundo (7)	Baré
2017	São Raimundo (8)	Baré
2018	São Raimundo (9)	Atlético Roraima
2019	São Raimundo (10)	Baré
2020	São Raimundo (11)	GAS
2021	São Raimundo (12)	Náutico
2022	São Raimundo (13)	Real
2023	São Raimundo (14)	GAS
2024	GAS (1)	São Raimundo
2025	GAS (2)	Monte Roraima
2026	GAS (3)	Baré

== Titles by team ==
Teams in bold stills active.

Rank	Club	Winners	Winning years
1	**Baré**	26	1950, 1953, 1954 (shared), 1955, 1956, 1957, 1958, 1960, 1961, 1962, 1963, 1964, 1965, 1968, 1969, 1970, 1972 (shared), 1982, 1984, 1986, 1988, 1996, 1997, 1999, 2006, 2010
2	**Atlético Roraima**	24	1946, 1948, 1949, 1951, 1954 (shared), 1972 (shared), 1975, 1976, 1978, 1980, 1981, 1983, 1985, 1987, 1990, 1993, 1995, 1998, 2001, 2002, 2003, 2007, 2008, 2009
3	**São Raimundo**	14	1977, 1992, 2004, 2005, 2012, 2014, 2016, 2017, 2018, 2019, 2020, 2021, 2022, 2023
4	**GAS**	3	2024, 2025, 2026
4	**Náutico**	3	1967, 2013, 2015
4	**River**	3	1979, 1989, 1994
7	**Rio Negro**	2	1991, 2000
8	**Real**	1	2011
8	Rio Branco	1	1952
8	São Francisco	1	1974
