= São Raimundo Esporte Clube (RR) =

Brazilian association football club based in Boa Vista, Roraima, Brazil

São Raimundo
- Full name: São Raimundo Esporte Clube
- Nicknames: Mundão (Big Mundo); Alviceleste Roraimense (White and sky blue from Roraima)
- Founded: 2 January 1963; 63 years ago
- Ground: Estádio Canarinho
- Capacity: 4,556
- President: Sérgio Caranguejo
- Head coach: Chiquinho Viana
- League: Campeonato Brasileiro Série D Campeonato Roraimense
- 2025: Roraimense, 4th of 8
Home colors	Away colors

São Raimundo Esporte Clube, commonly referred to as São Raimundo de Roraima, São Raimundo-RR or simply São Raimundo is a Brazilian professional club based in Boa Vista, Roraima founded on 2 January 1963. It competes in the Campeonato Brasileiro Série D, the fourth tier of Brazilian football, as well as in the Campeonato Roraimense, the top flight of the Roraima state football league.

São Raimundo is the top ranked team from Roraima in CBF's national club ranking, being placed 78th overall.

== History ==
São Raimundo was founded in 1963. The club is the third most champion of the state of Roraima, with 7 titles.

== Stadium ==
São Raimundo play their home games at Estádio Ribeirão. The stadium has a maximum capacity of 3,000 people.

== Honours ==
=== State ===
- Campeonato Roraimense
  - Winners (14): 1977, 1992, 2004, 2005, 2012, 2014, 2016, 2017, 2018, 2019, 2020, 2021, 2022, 2023
  - Runners-up (11): 1975, 1981, 1988, 1991, 1997, 2006, 2009, 2011, 2013, 2015, 2024

=== Women's Football ===
- Campeonato Roraimense de Futebol Feminino
  - Winners (10): 2009, 2013, 2014, 2015, 2017, 2018, 2019, 2020, 2021, 2022
