= Atlético Roraima Clube =

Roraima
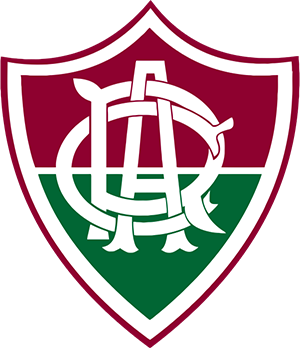
- Full name: Atlético Roraima Clube
- Nickname: Tricolor da Mecejana (Tricolor from Mecejana)
- Founded: October 1, 1944
- Ground: Canarinho, Boa Vista, Brazil
- Capacity: 10,000
- League: Campeonato Roraimense
- 2025: Roraimense, 7th of 8
Home colours	Away colours

Atlético Roraima Clube, also known as Atlético Roraima, or just Roraima, are a Brazilian football team from Boa Vista, Roraima. They competed in the Série C in 1995 and in the Série D in 2009.

Atlético is currently ranked fourth among Roraima teams in CBF's national club ranking, at 185th place overall.

== History ==
Atlético Roraima Clube were founded on October 1, 1944. They won the state championship eighteen times. They competed in the Série C in 1995, when they were eliminated in the second stage by Nacional. Roraima competed in the Série D in 2009 when they were eliminated in the first stage of the competition.

== Stadium ==
Roraima play their home games at Estádio Flamarion Vasconcelos, commonly known as Canarinho. The stadium has a maximum capacity of 10,000 people.

== Honours ==
=== State ===
- Campeonato Roraimense
  - Winners (24): 1946, 1948, 1949, 1951, 1954 (shared), 1972 (shared), 1975, 1976, 1978, 1980, 1981, 1983, 1985, 1987, 1990, 1993, 1995, 1998, 2001, 2002, 2003, 2007, 2008, 2009
- Torneio Sesquicentenário
  - Winners (1): 1972

=== Women's Football ===
- Campeonato Roraimense de Futebol Feminino
  - Winners (1): 2010
