= Grêmio Atlético Sampaio =

Brazilian association football club based in Boa Vista, Roraima

GAS
- Full name: Grêmio Atlético Sampaio
- Nickname: Leão Dourado (Golden Lion)
- Founded: 11 June 1965; 61 years ago
- Ground: Estádio Canarinho
- Capacity: 4,456
- President: Jander Cavalcante
- Head coach: Paulo Morgado
- League: Campeonato Brasileiro Série D Campeonato Roraimense
- 2025 2025: Série D, 46th of 64; Roraimense, 1st of 8 (champions)
Home colors	Away colors	Third colors

Grêmio Atlético Sampaio, commonly referred to as GAS, is a Brazilian professional club based in Boa Vista, Roraima, founded on 11 June 1965. It competes in the Campeonato Brasileiro Série D, the fourth tier of Brazilian football, as well as in the Campeonato Roraimense, the top flight of the Roraima state football league.

GAS is currently ranked third among Roraima teams in CBF's national club ranking at 157th place overall. They are the best placed team in the state from outside capital Boa Vista.

== History ==
The club was founded on 11 June 1965, in Boa Vista, Roraima. They competed in the Série C in 1996, when they were eliminated in the First Stage of the competition.

In 2018 they started a partnership, therefore they moved to Caracaraí.

== Stadium ==
Originally, Grêmio Atlético Sampaio played their home games at Estádio Flamarion Vasconcelos (Boa Vista), nicknamed Canarinho. The stadium has a maximum capacity of 6,000 people.

Starting from 2018, GAS play their home matches at Estadio Vital Rodrigues in Caracaraí.

== Honours ==
- Campeonato Roraimense
  - Winners (3): 2024, 2025, 2026
  - Runners-up (5): 1970, 1978, 1996, 2020, 2023
