= Boa Vista, Roraima =

Capital city of Roraima, Brazil

Boa Vista
- Municipality
- Municipality of Boa Vista
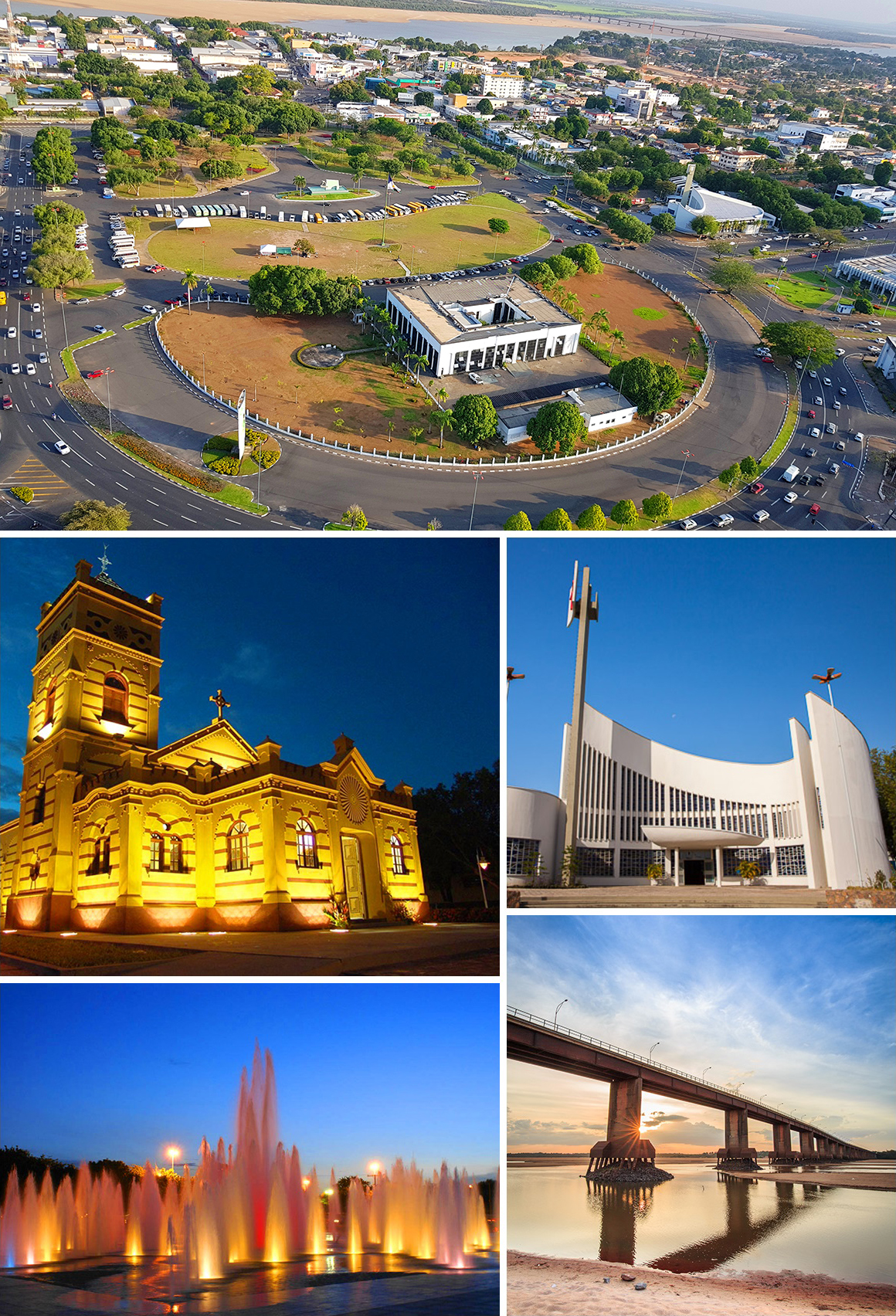
- Above:Aerial view of Central Civic Square (Praça dos Centro Cívico) and Helio Campos Palace (Paço dos Helio Campos), Middle:Boa Vista Matriz Church (Paróquia Matriz de Nossa Senhora do Carmo), Boa Vista Cristo Redentor Cathedral (Diocese de Roraima), Bottom:A fountain in Águas Square (Praça das Águas), Macuxis Bridge (Ponte dos Macuxis), all items from left to right

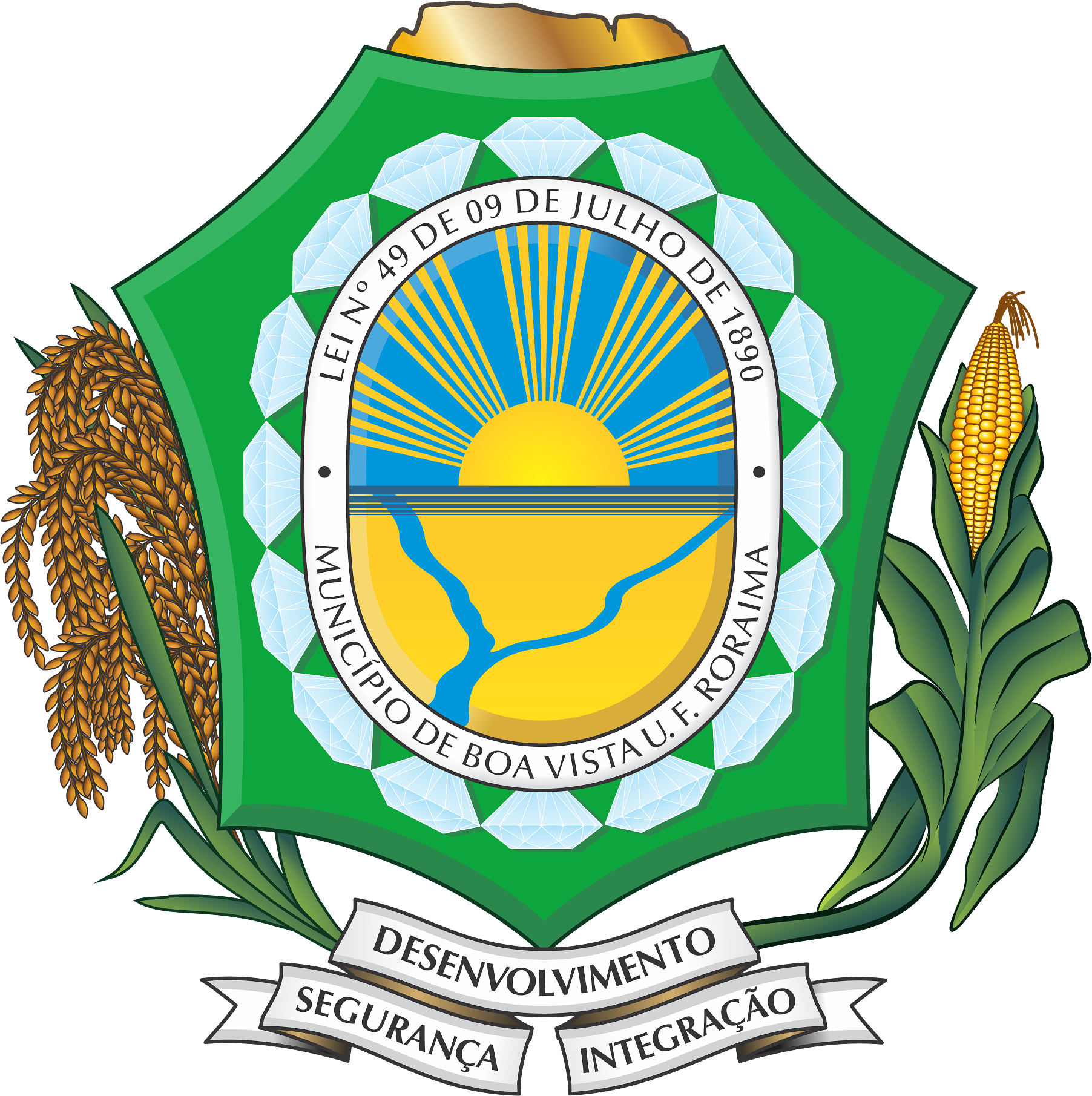
- Flag Coat of arms
- Nickname: "BV" "Princesa do Norte" "Capital da Primeira Infância"
- Motto: "Segurança, Desenvolvimento, Integração" ("Security, Development, Integration")
- Location of Boa Vista in the State of Roraima

- Location in Brazil
- Coordinates: 2°49′10″N 60°40′17″W
- Country: Brazil
- Region: North
- State: Roraima
- Founded: July 9, 1890

Government
  - Mayor: Marcelo Zeitoune (PL)

Area
  - Municipality: 5,687.022 km^{2} (2,195.771 sq mi)
- Elevation: 90 m (300 ft)

Population (2025)
  - Municipality: 485,477
  - Density: 85.3658/km^{2} (221.096/sq mi)
  - Metro: 530,119
- Demonym: boa-vistense
- Time zone: UTC−4 (AMT)
- Postal code: 69300-001 to 69339-999
- Area code: +55 95
- HDI (2010): 0.752 – high
- Website: www.boavista.rr.gov.br

Boa Vista (Brazilian Portuguese: [ˈbo(w)ɐ ˈvistɐ], literally Good View; figuratively "Fairview") is the capital of the Brazilian state of Roraima. Situated on the western bank of the Branco River, the city lies 109 km from Brazil's border with Venezuela, and 58 km away from the border with Guyana. It is the only Brazilian state capital located entirely north of the equator.

Boa Vista is the most populous municipality in the state of Roraima; approximately half of the population of the state lives in the city. Commerce mostly occurs with Manaus, the capital of the State of Amazonas. Business also takes place between Boa Vista and the cities of Lethem, in Guyana and Santa Elena de Uairén, in Venezuela. Boa Vista also has a cultural and commercial brotherhood relationship with the city of Caruaru. These three foreign cities are the only major cities that can be accessed from Boa Vista by road, although roads connect other smaller state municipalities with the capital city. Travel by airplane is the only means of transportation with other regions of the country.

As a modern city, Boa Vista stands out among the other capitals of the North Region of Brazil as it is a planned city with a radial plan. It was planned by the architect Darci Aleixo Derenusson who based his design for the city on one that is similar to that of Paris, France. The city was built under the direction of Captain Ene Garcez, the first governor of Roraima.

== History ==
Boa Vista, 1975. National Archives of Brazil.

The municipality of Boa Vista formed the first urban area of the state of Roraima. The São Joaquim do Rio Branco Fort, founded in 1775, is located on the banks of the Uraricoera River about 32 km from the capital and is considered to be of great importance to the region.

The city was created on July 9, 1890, as Boa Vista do Rio Branco. It was founded by Augusto Villeroy (Amazonas's Governor). The first mayor was João Capistrano da Silva Mota, also known as Coronel Mota. After the mayor, two councillors (José Francisco Coelho and José Gonzaga de Souza Junior) were appointed.

In 1943, during the middle of World War II, Boa Vista became the capital of the recently created Federal Territory of Rio Branco. The territory grew from mining operations in the area. The then Federal Territory of Rio Branco was elevated to statehood, later being renamed as "Roraima". Later, machine-based mining was prohibited (because of the resulting damage to the landscape), which ended up hindering the economy of the state and the municipality.

In the 2010s, the crisis in Venezuela led to the population swelling by around 50,000 Venezuelan immigrants.

== Economy ==
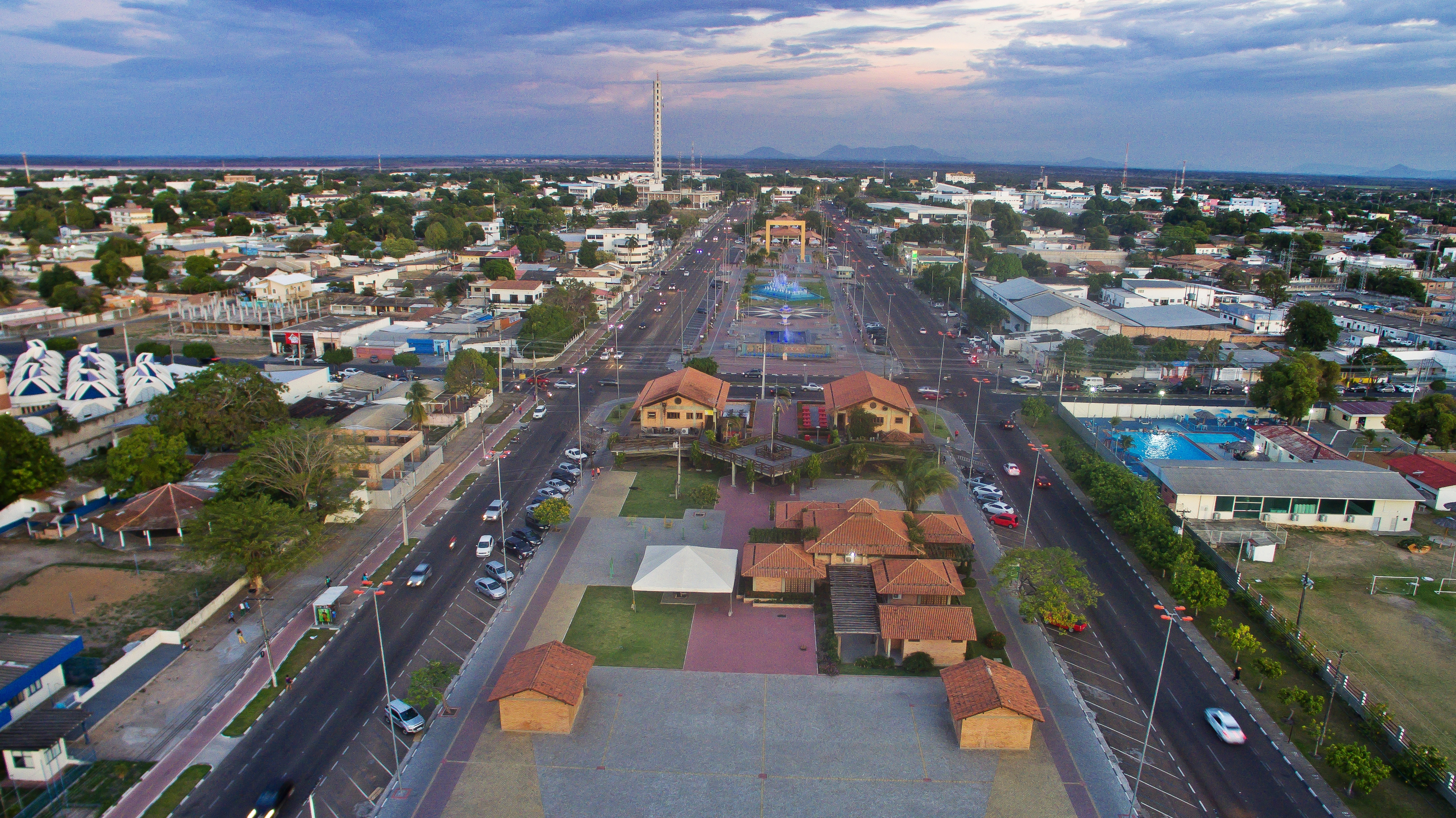
Boa Vista, Brazil

The GDP of the city was R$ 2,265,603,000 (2005).

The per capita income of the city was R$ 9,366 (2005).

== Education ==
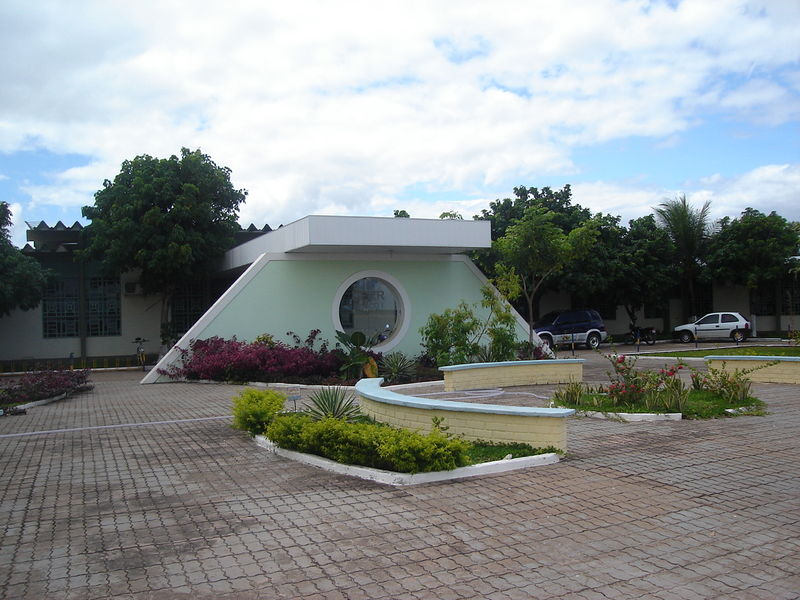
Federal University of Roraima.

Portuguese is the official national language, and the primary language taught in schools. English and Spanish are part of the official high school curriculum.

Educational institutions include:

- Universidade Federal de Roraima (UFRR);
- Instituto Federal de Roraima (IFRR);
- Facudade Estácio Atual da Amazônia;
- Faculdades Cathedral – Boa Vista (Cathedral-Boa Vista);
- Faculdade de Teologia de Boa Vista (Fatebov)

== Tourism and recreation ==
- Anaua Park, a major recreational park is located in Boa Vista. It is the biggest park in the North Region of Brazil. It has a Forrodromo (show place), a square, a lake and a kart-racing facility.
- Taumanam is a small artificial beach on the Rio Branco. It has several stores and snack bars, and was created in 2005.
- The Ayrton Senna complex is the most visited tourist attraction in Boa Vista. It consists of Ayrton Senna, Velia Coutinho (Alimentation Square and a show place), Praça das Águas (a square with a water show), Millennium Portal (it was created to commemorate the 21st century), and Praça das Artes (the newest and the largest plazas in the complex).

== Culture ==
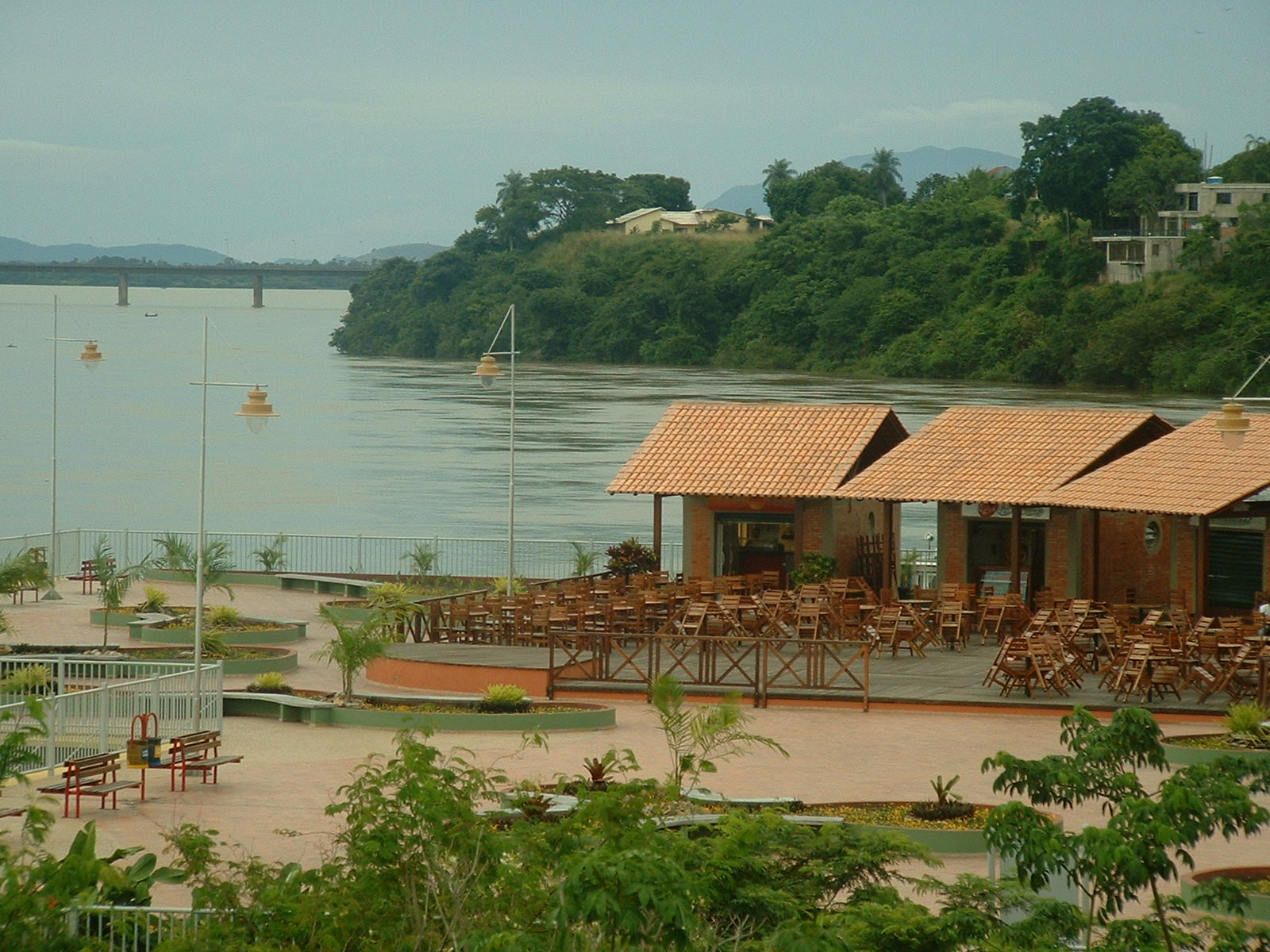
Taumanam, Boa Vista, Brazil

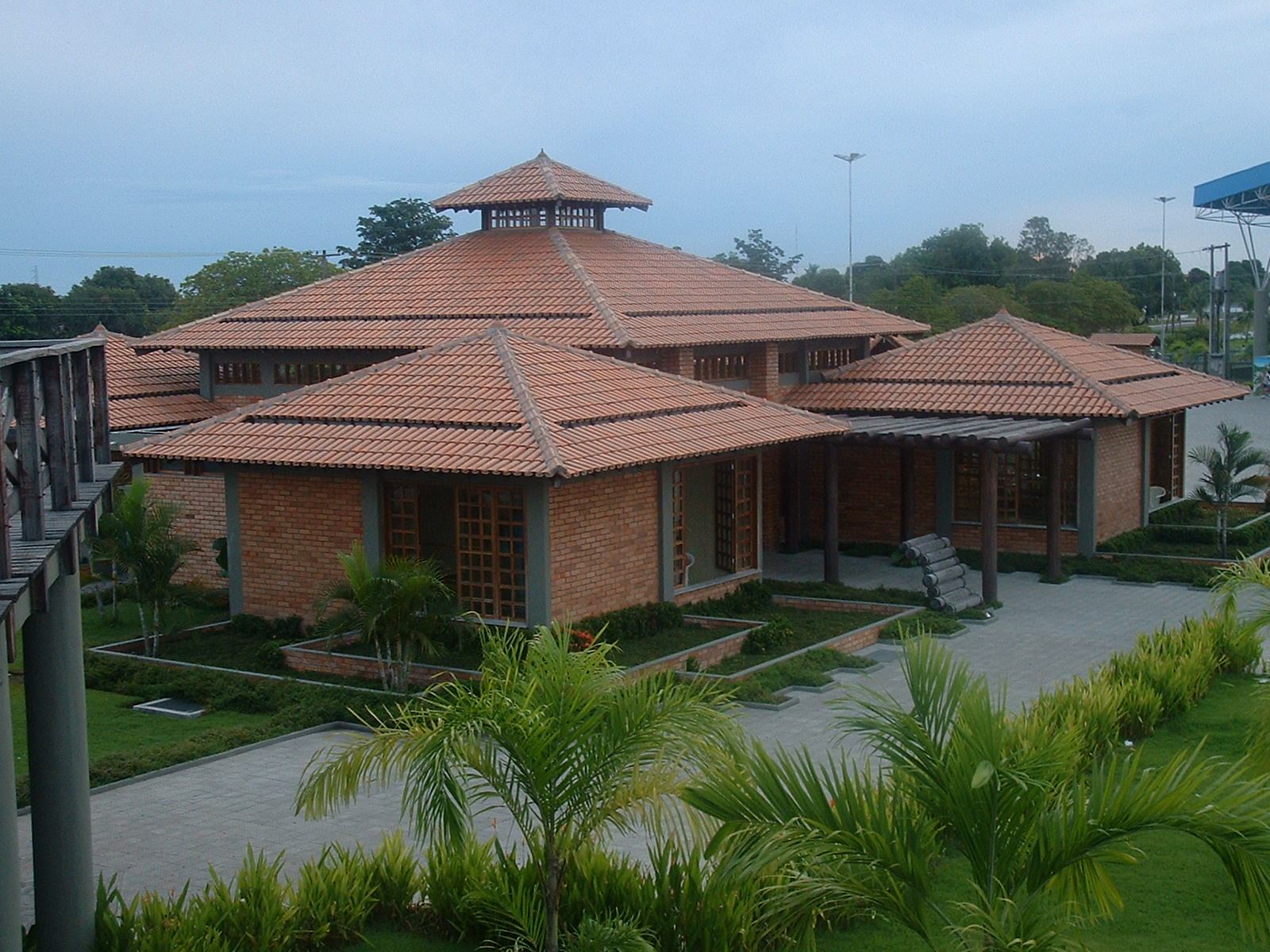
Velia Coutinho in Boa Vista, Roraima

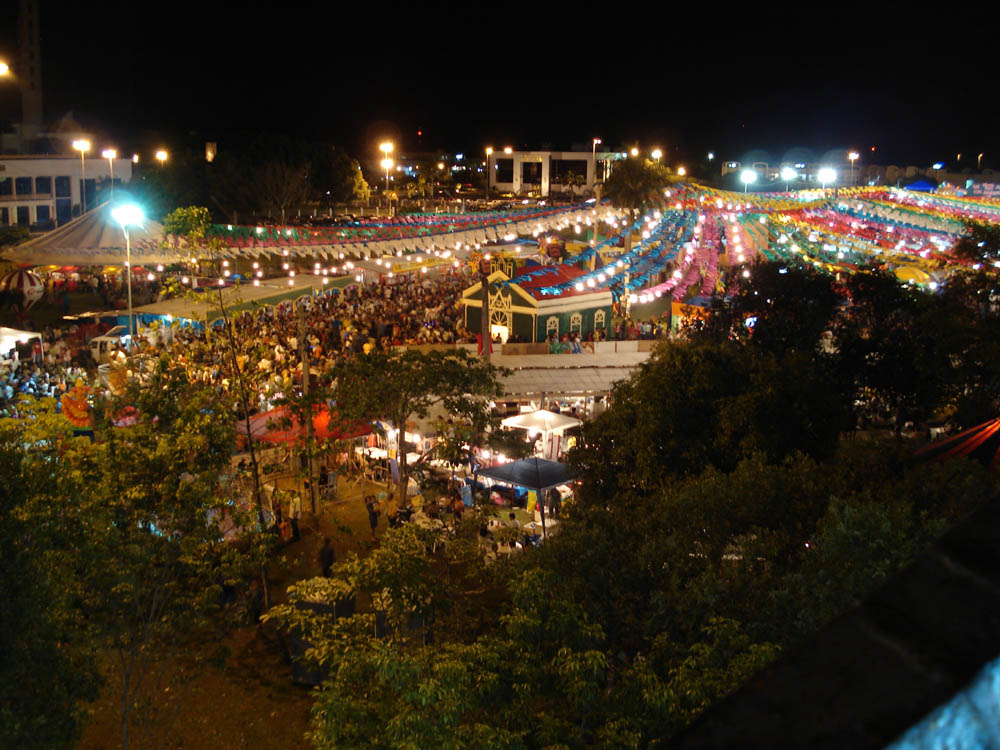
Festa Junina of Boa Vista, Brazil

=== Festa Junina (Saint John Festival) ===
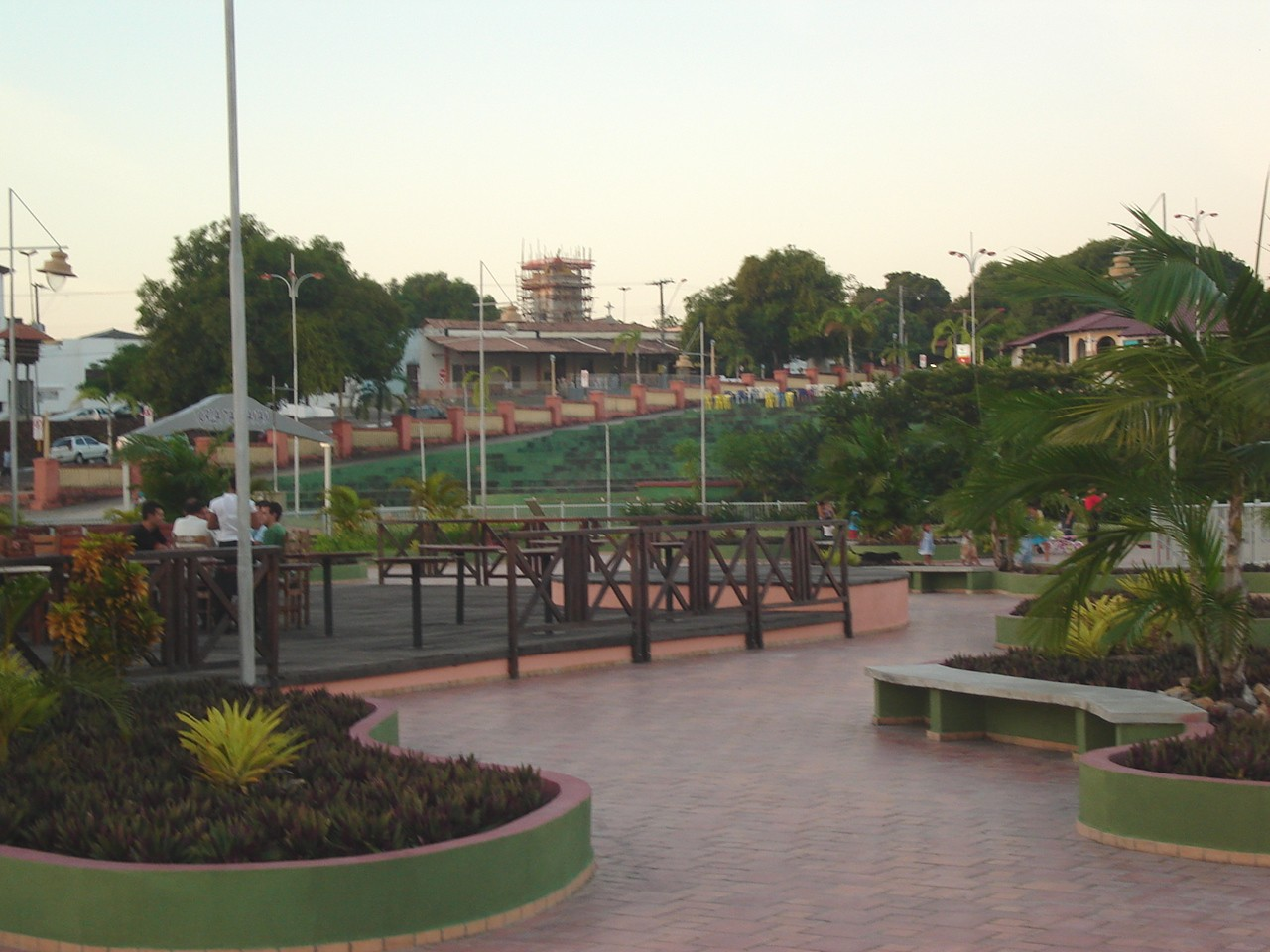
Orla Taumanan Park

Festa Junina was introduced to Northeastern Brazil by the Portuguese for whom St John's day (also celebrated as Midsummer Day in European countries), on 24 June, is one of the oldest and most popular celebrations of the year. The festivities traditionally begin after 12 June, on the eve of St Anthony's day, and last until the 29th, which is Saint Peter's day. During these fifteen days, there are bonfires, fireworks, and folk dancing in the streets (step names are in French, which shows the mutual influences between court life and peasant culture in the 17th, 18th, and 19th-century Europe). Once exclusively a rural celebration, today, in Brazil, it is now largely a city festival.

=== The Civic Center ===
Praça dos Garimpeiros-Miners' monument.

The Civic Center, built in the form of an opened fan, starts from the banks of the Rio Branco. This design was created by the engineer Darci Aleixo Deregusson during Ene Garcez's government, the first of its kind in Roraima.

From the Civic Center runs a system of 16 avenues, with inspiration drawn from Paris, France, Belo Horizonte, and Goiânia, Brazil. In this square are the head offices of the Executive, Judicial and Legislative branches of the state government. Other buildings of significance are the Palace of Culture, the Amazônia Bank, the Ministry of Education, and a cathedral.

The civic center also has a monument to miners.

== Demographics ==
Boa Vista had significant relative growth in the 1970s and 1980s, especially due to its placement as the state of Roraima's capital, with the urban population of the city growing exponentially from 1970 to 1980 relative to the outer rings of countryside, with it more than quadrupling since 1980.

According to the 2022 Census by IBGE, the city is predominantly pardo, with them making up 62.2% of the population.

Ethnic groups in Boa Vista, Roraima (2022 Census)
1. Pardo (mixed) 256,902 (62.2%)
2. White 102,242 (24.7%)
3. Black 35,139 (8.51%)
4. Yellow (Asian) 606 (0.15%)
5. Indigenous 18,228 (4.41%)

Historical population
| Year | Pop. | ±% |
|---|---|---|
| 1940 | 10,509 | — |
| 1950 | 17,247 | +64.1% |
| 1960 | 25,705 | +49.0% |
| 1970 | 36,464 | +41.9% |
| 1980 | 67,047 | +83.9% |
| 1990 | 144,249 | +115.1% |
| 2000 | 200,568 | +39.0% |
| 2010 | 284,313 | +41.8% |
| 2022 | 413,486 | +45.4% |

== Sports ==
There are several professional football clubs in Boa Vista:

- Atlético Roraima Clube
- Baré Esporte Clube
- Grêmio Atlético Sampaio (GAS)
- São Raimundo Esporte Clube
- River Esporte Clube
- Atlético Rio Negro Clube
- Náutico Futebol Clube

The city's most important stadium is Estádio Flamarion Vasconcelos, better known as Canarinho, located in the neighborhood of the same name, Canarinho. The stadium, which located in the southern part of Boa Vista, has a maximum capacity of 10,000 people.

Also located in Boa Vista is the Estádio Raimundo Ribeiro de Souza, better known as the Ribeirão, which is located in a suburb of the city.

== Geography ==
The city is situated on the western bank of the Branco River, and it lies 220 km from Brazil's border with Venezuela. It is the only Brazilian state capital located entirely north of the equator.

=== Climate ===
Boa Vista experiences a tropical savanna climate (Koppen Aw), with a hot, humid wet season and a very warm dry season. Being the only major Brazilian city north of the equator, the wettest and driest months in Boa Vista are the reverse of the rest of the Amazonian region of Brazil, with a hot, humid, rainy period from April to November and a very warm, dry period from December to March. Temperature fluctuations are relatively small throughout the year. When considering the four seasons (spring, summer, fall, winter), summer (June to August) is the rainiest and coldest season, while fall (September to November) is the hottest season.

The Maracá Ecological Station was established by presidential decree on 2 June 1981. The station consists of the island of Maracá between the Santa Rosa and Maracá branches of the Uraricoera River in the municipality of Boa Vista, and has an area of 101,312 hectares (250,350 acres). The strictly protected area was established with the purpose of preserving a representative sample of the Amazon ecosystem.

Climate data for Boa Vista (1991–2020 normals, extremes 1981–present)
| Month | Jan | Feb | Mar | Apr | May | Jun | Jul | Aug | Sep | Oct | Nov | Dec | Year |
|---|---|---|---|---|---|---|---|---|---|---|---|---|---|
| Record high °C (°F) | 38.4 (101.1) | 42.6 (108.7) | 40.1 (104.2) | 39.1 (102.4) | 37.6 (99.7) | 36.1 (97.0) | 35.7 (96.3) | 39.4 (102.9) | 39.5 (103.1) | 42.6 (108.7) | 42.0 (107.6) | 41.2 (106.2) | 42.6 (108.7) |
| Mean daily maximum °C (°F) | 33.3 (91.9) | 34.1 (93.4) | 34.7 (94.5) | 34.1 (93.4) | 32.4 (90.3) | 32.0 (89.6) | 32.1 (89.8) | 33.3 (91.9) | 34.9 (94.8) | 35.7 (96.3) | 35.3 (95.5) | 34.1 (93.4) | 33.8 (92.8) |
| Daily mean °C (°F) | 28.1 (82.6) | 28.3 (82.9) | 28.8 (83.8) | 28.3 (82.9) | 27.2 (81.0) | 26.5 (79.7) | 26.5 (79.7) | 27.3 (81.1) | 28.4 (83.1) | 28.9 (84.0) | 28.9 (84.0) | 28.3 (82.9) | 28.0 (82.4) |
| Mean daily minimum °C (°F) | 24.2 (75.6) | 24.5 (76.1) | 24.8 (76.6) | 24.5 (76.1) | 23.9 (75.0) | 23.5 (74.3) | 23.3 (73.9) | 23.8 (74.8) | 24.5 (76.1) | 24.8 (76.6) | 24.9 (76.8) | 24.5 (76.1) | 24.3 (75.7) |
| Record low °C (°F) | 19.5 (67.1) | 20.0 (68.0) | 19.2 (66.6) | 20.0 (68.0) | 19.0 (66.2) | 18.6 (65.5) | 17.6 (63.7) | 19.2 (66.6) | 20.2 (68.4) | 19.6 (67.3) | 20.0 (68.0) | 18.3 (64.9) | 17.6 (63.7) |
| Average precipitation mm (inches) | 29.1 (1.15) | 32.2 (1.27) | 39.2 (1.54) | 146.5 (5.77) | 347.3 (13.67) | 335.7 (13.22) | 208.1 (8.19) | 220.7 (8.69) | 98.1 (3.86) | 67.1 (2.64) | 69.6 (2.74) | 60.4 (2.38) | 1,654 (65.12) |
| Average precipitation days (≥ 1 mm) | 3 | 4 | 4 | 9 | 19 | 20 | 21 | 17 | 9 | 5 | 6 | 4 | 121 |
| Average relative humidity (%) | 70.0 | 68.3 | 67.7 | 74.3 | 83.1 | 84.6 | 85.1 | 81.5 | 75.0 | 72.5 | 72.7 | 72.9 | 75.6 |
| Mean monthly sunshine hours | 177.8 | 148.2 | 142.4 | 129.2 | 138.3 | 93.5 | 136.3 | 155.3 | 200.7 | 204.8 | 195.8 | 173.5 | 1,895.8 |

== Transport ==
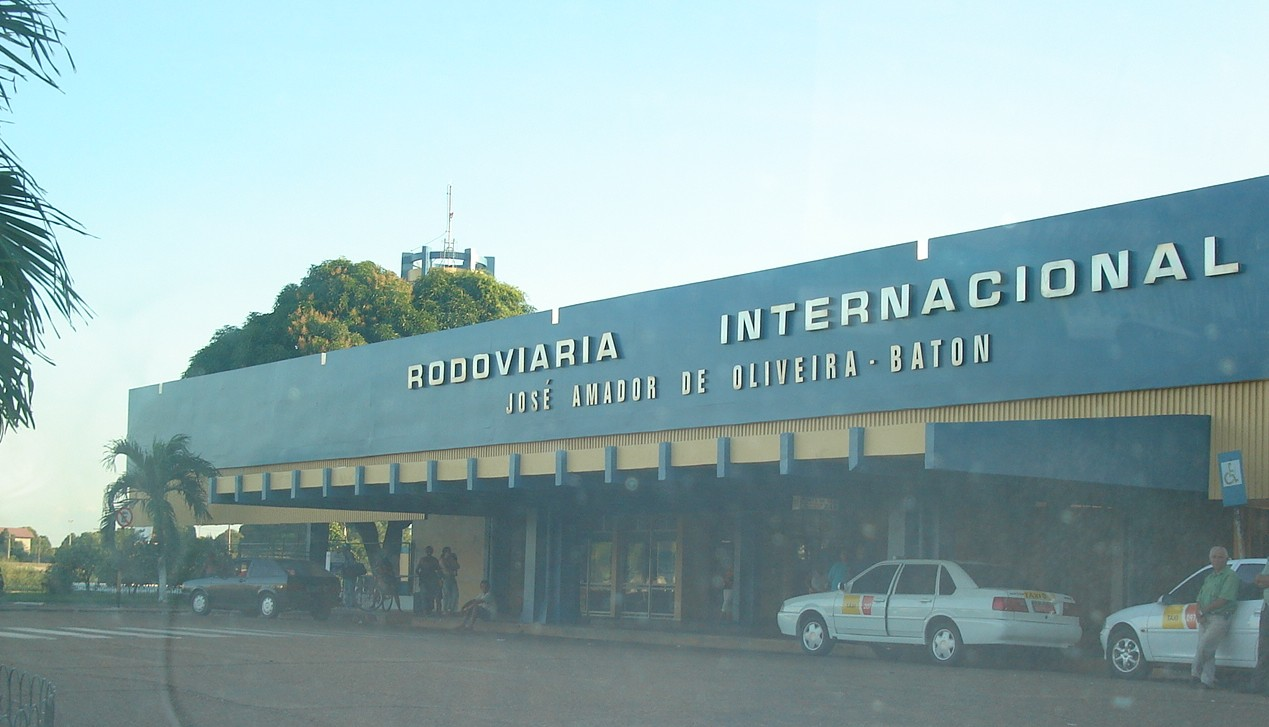
José Amador de Oliveira International Bus Station.

=== International Airport ===
Boa Vista is served by Boa Vista-Atlas Brasil Cantanhede International Airport with direct flights to Brasília, Georgetown (Guyana), and Manaus. Boa Vista International Airport was opened on February 19, 1973, and underwent major remodelings in 1998 and 2009. The passenger terminal, runway and apron were all enlarged, and a separate taxiway was built.

Boa Vista Air Force Base - ALA7, one of the most important bases of the Brazilian Air Force, is located in Boa Vista.

=== Highways ===
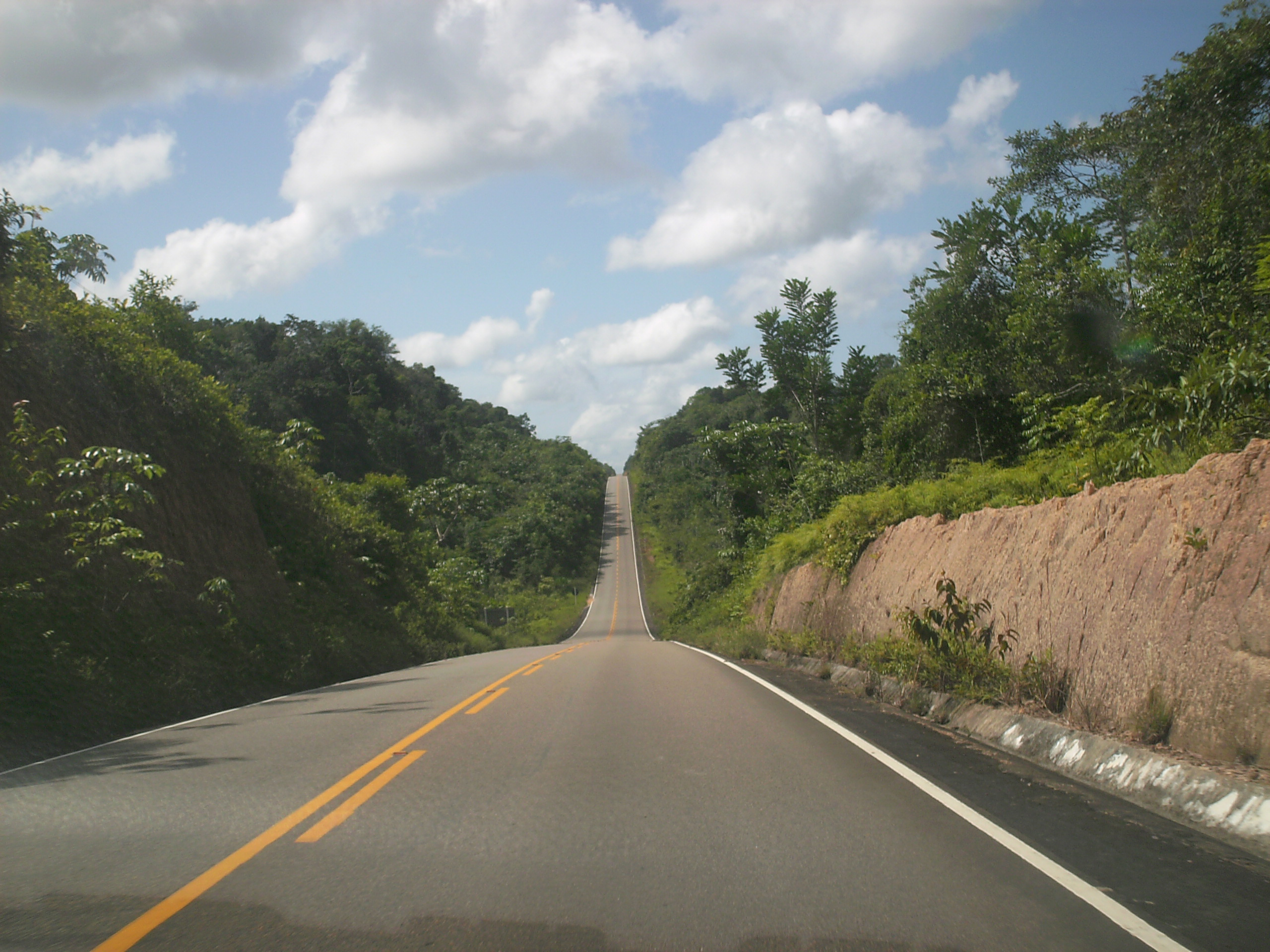
BR-174, Boa Vista/Venezuela to Manaus.

The federal government has started a project to link Boa Vista by road to Manaus and then by extension to the major centers of Brazil, by asphalting the BR-174 and building several bridges in the Amazon forest, allowing a direct road link to Manaus and then on over the BR-319 to the central regions of Brazil.

== Notable people ==
- Miquéias Fernandes (1950–2020), politician and pastor
- Johnathan de Jesus (b. 1983), politician
- Thiago Maia (b. 1997), footballer
- Luiz Altamir Melo (b. 1996), swimmer
- Shéridan Oliveira (b. 1984), politician and psychologist
- Bianca Matte (b. 1990), beauty queen

== Consular representation ==
Guyana has a Consulate in Boa Vista.
