= Estádio Canarinho =

Football stadium in Boa Vista, Roraima, Brazil

Coordinates: 2.8314°N 60.6606°W

The Estádio Flamarion Vasconcelos, known as the Canarinho, is a football stadium located in the city of Boa Vista, Roraima, Brazil. The stadium is owned by the state of Roraima.

The ground was opened on 6 September 1975 and was initially known as Estádio 13 de Setembro. It was subsequently renamed after Flamarion Vasconcelos, a sports journalist from Roraima. It is known as the Canarinho, after the neighbourhood in which the stadium is located.

== Renovation ==
Work to expand the stadium began in the first half of 2012. The project was expected to cost R$100 million.
