= 2023 Campeonato Capixaba =

Campeonato Capixaba
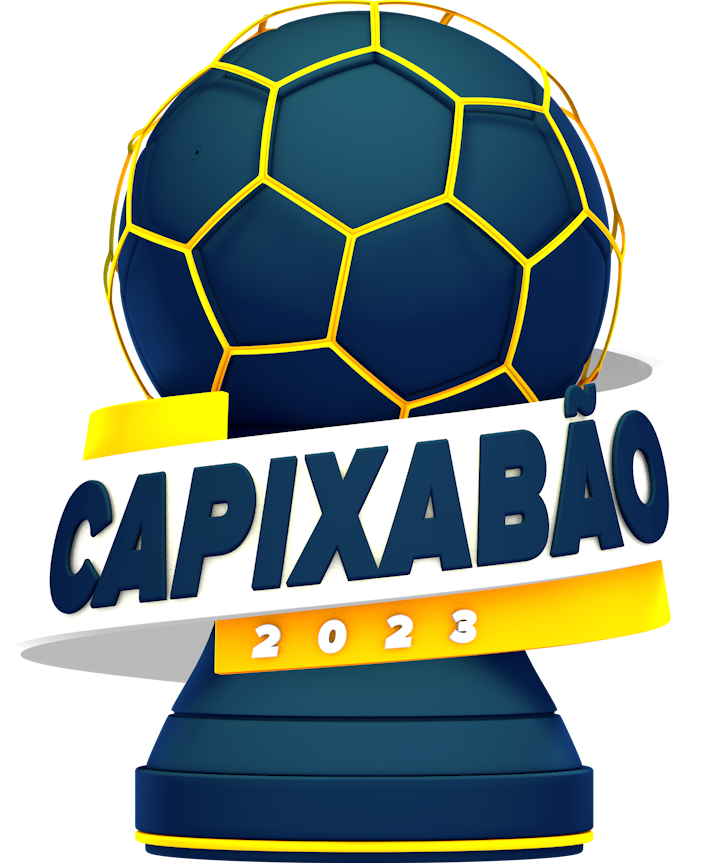
- Season: 2023
- Dates: 19 January – 22 April
- Champions: Real Noroeste (3rd title)
- Relegated: Vilavelhense; Atlético Itapemirim
- Série D: Real Noroeste; Nova Venécia
- Copa do Brasil: Real Noroeste
- Copa Verde: Real Noroeste
- Matches: 58
- Goals: 165 (2.84 per match)
- Top goalscorer: Matheus Bidick (9 goals)
- All statistics correct as of 23 April 2023.

The 2023 Campeonato Capixaba (officially the Capixabão BANESTES 2023 for sponsorship reasons) was the 107th edition of Espírito Santo's top professional football league organized by FES. The competition started on January 19 and ended on April 22.

== Format ==
The format was the same as the last four editions. In the first stage, the ten participants played against each other in a single round, with the best eight advancing to the Quarter-finals. The five best placed teams in the last edition played five games as the home team (Nova Venécia, Serra, Real Noroeste, Estrela do Norte and Vitória), the others played only four games as the home team. The final stage was played in a knockout system, facedre the teams face each other in an "cruzamento olímpico" (English: Olympic crossover) with home and away games, until the finals. The teams with the best campaigns in the first stage played as the home team on the second leg of the final stage.

The champion earned the right to compete in the 2024 Copa do Brasil and the 2024 Campeonato Brasileiro Série D. The bottom two teams in the first stage were relegated to the 2024 Campeonato Capixaba Série B.

== Participating teams ==
Club	Headquarters	Manager	2022 result
Atlético Itapemirim	Itapemirim	(Brazil) Mádisson Souza	1st (Série B)
Desportiva Ferroviária	Cariacica	(Brazil) Antônio Carlos Roy	8th
Estrela do Norte	Cachoeiro de Itapemirim	(Brazil) Vladimir de Jesus	5th
Nova Venécia	Nova Venécia	(Brazil) Cássio Barros	3rd
Porto Vitória	Serra	(Brazil) Erich Bomfim	2nd (Série B)
Real Noroeste	Águia Branca	(Brazil) Duzinho Reis	1st
Rio Branco	Vitória	(Brazil) Eleomar Pereira	6th
Serra	Serra	(Brazil) Ney Barreto	4th
Vilavelhense	Vila Velha	(Brazil) Fellipi Marques	7st
Vitória	Vitória	(Brazil) Rodrigo César	2nd

== First stage ==
Pos	Team	Pld	W	D	L	GF	GA	GD	Pts	Qualification or relegation
1	Vitória	9	6	1	2	20	8	+12	19	Advance to Quarter-finals
2	Porto Vitória	9	6	1	2	20	12	+8	19	Advance to Quarter-finals
3	Real Noroeste	9	6	0	3	15	9	+6	18	Advance to Quarter-finals
4	Nova Venécia	9	5	0	4	16	9	+7	15	Advance to Quarter-finals
5	Rio Branco	9	5	0	4	11	12	−1	15	Advance to Quarter-finals
6	Serra	9	4	3	2	15	11	+4	15	Advance to Quarter-finals
7	Desportiva Ferroviária	9	3	2	4	8	14	−6	11	Advance to Quarter-finals
8	Estrela do Norte	9	3	1	5	9	11	−2	10	Advance to Quarter-finals
9	Vilavelhense (R)	9	2	2	5	12	16	−4	8	Relegation to 2024 Série B
10	Itapemirim (R)	9	0	0	9	2	26	−24	0	Relegation to 2024 Série B

Source: ge
(R) Relegated

== Final stage ==
=== Bracket ===
Quarter-finals
Vitória	2	1	3
Estrela do Norte	1	2	3
Nova Venécia	2	3	5
Rio Branco	2	0	2
Porto Vitória	2	1	3
Desportiva Ferroviária	2	1	3
Real Noroeste	1	1	2
Serra	2	0	2

Semi-finals
Vitória	1	2	3 (7)
Nova Venécia (p)	3	0	3 (8)
Porto Vitória	1	1	2 (2)
Real Noroeste (p)	2	0	2 (3)

Finals
Nova Venécia	0	1	1
Real Noroeste	0	3	3

=== Quarter-finals ===
Team 1	Agg.	Team 2	1st leg	2nd leg
Vitória	3–3	Estrela do Norte	2–1	1–2
Nova Venécia	5–2	Rio Branco	2–2	3–0
Porto Vitória	3–3	Desportiva Ferroviária	2–2	1–1
Real Noroeste	2–2	Serra	1–2	1–0

=== Semifinals ===
Team 1	Agg.	Team 2	1st leg	2nd leg
Vitória	3–3 (7–8 p)	Nova Venécia	1–3	2–0
Porto Vitória	2–2 (2–3 p)	Real Noroeste	1–2	1–0

=== Finals ===
Team 1	Agg.	Team 2	1st leg	2nd leg
Nova Venécia	1–3	Real Noroeste	0–0	1–3
