= 2017 Campeonato Capixaba =

Campeonato Capixaba Série A
- Season: 2017
- Dates: Start date: 28 January 2017; 6 May 2017
- Teams: 10
- Champions: Itapemirim
- Relegated: Linhares; Rio Branco
- Matches played: 50
- Goals scored: 116 (2.32 per match)
- Top goalscorer: Márcio Gesteira da Silva (Rio Branco) (6 goals)
- Biggest home win: Itapemirim 4-0 Tupy (March 22); Desportiva Ferroviária 4-0 Tupy (March 25)
- Highest attendance: 21,919
- Average attendance: 430

The 2017 Campeonato Capixaba Série A is the 101st season of the top professional football league in Espírito Santo. It was won by Itapemirim for the first time when they defeated Doze 4-3 over aggregate.

== Public Safety ==
In February 2017, the police of Espírito Santo went on strike. In response, the Federação de Futebol do Estado do Espírito Santo, which runs all competitions in Espírito Santo, postponed the competition for over a month, from February 4 to March 8. This resulted in the competition ending two weeks later than planned.

== Format ==
First Round

- Unlike 2016, all ten teams play each other once.
- The top four teams go to the Semi-Finals.
- The bottom four teams are relegated to the 2018 Campeonato Capixaba Série B.

Final Rounds

- The teams are paired according to their ranking:
- 1st vs. 4th
- 2nd vs. 3rd
- The games are decided over two legs, with the better team hosting the second leg.
- If one of the semi-finals are tied, the teams with the better ranking move on to the final.
- The two winners move on to the final, also played over two legs.
- The team with the better record in the first round hosts the second leg.

Qualification

- The top team not already playing in Série A, Série B, or Série C, or already assured qualification to Série D qualifies for the 2018 Campeonato Brasileiro Série D
- The winner qualifies for the 2018 Copa do Brasil.
- The winner qualifies for the 2018 Copa Verde.

== Teams ==
Club	Home city	2016 result
Itapemirirm	Itapemirim	6th
Desportiva Ferroviária	Cariacica	1st
Doze	Vitória	8th
Espírito Santo	Vitória	2nd
Linhares	Linhares	4th
Real Noroeste	Águia Branca	3rd
Rio Branco	Vitória	5th
São Mateus	São Mateus	7th
Tupy	Vila Velha	2nd (Série B)
Vitória-ES	Vitória	1st (Série B)

== First round ==
Key to colours in table
Top four teams advance to the Semi-Finals
Six bottom teams are eliminated, two bottom teams are relegated.

Pos	Team	Pld	W	D	L	GF	GA	GD	Pts	Qualification or relegation
1	Itapemirim (A)	9	6	3	0	18	6	+12	21	Advance to Semi-Finals
2	Doze (A)	9	6	1	2	15	11	+4	19	Advance to Semi-Finals
3	Espírito Santo (A)	9	3	4	2	10	8	+2	13	Advance to Semi-Finals
4	Tupy (A)	9	3	3	3	9	12	−3	12	Advance to Semi-Finals
5	São Mateus	9	3	2	4	13	14	−1	11	
6	Vitória-ES	9	2	5	2	8	10	−2	11	
7	Real Noroeste	9	3	1	5	10	14	−4	10	
8	Desportiva Ferroviária	9	2	4	3	10	7	+3	10	
9	Rio Branco (R)	9	2	4	3	10	13	−3	10	Relegated to 2018 Campeonato Capixaba Série B
10	Linhares (R)	9	0	3	6	5	13	−8	3	Relegated to 2018 Campeonato Capixaba Série B

(A) Advance to a further round; (R) Relegated

== Final Rounds ==
Semifinals
4	Tupy	0	1	1
1	Itapemirim	2	1	3
3	Espírito Santo	0	0	0
2	Doze	0	0	0

Finals
1	Itapemirim	2	2	4
2	Doze	2	1	3

=== Semi-finals ===
15 April 2017
16:30 UTC–4

Tupy	0-2	Itapemirim
	Report	Weliton 2'; Wendell 71'

Estádio Kléber Andrade, Cariacica
Attendance: 354
Referee: Devarly do Rosário

22 April 2017
16:30 UTC–4

Itapemirim	1-1	Tupy
Giovani Pedrini 42' (o.g.)	Report	Giovani Pedrini 87'

Estádio José Olívio Soares, Itapemirim
Attendance: 800
Referee: Dyorgines Padovani

Itapemirim win 3-1 on aggregate.

16 April 2017
16:00 UTC–4

Espírito Santo	0-0	Doze
	Report

Estádio Kléber Andrade, Cariacica
Attendance: 230
Referee: Rudimar Goltara

22 April 2017
16:30 UTC–4

Doze	0-0	Espírito Santo
	Report

Estádio Kléber Andrade, Cariacica
Attendance: 1,120
Referee: Devarly do Rosário

Doze win, being the team with the better record, after a 0-0 draw on aggregate.

=== Final ===
22 April 2017
16:30 UTC–4

Doze	2-2	Itapemirim
Marcone 66'; Lucas Balbino 79'	Report	89' (o.g.) Marcone; 90+2' (Pen.) Wendell

Estádio Kléber Andrade, Cariacica
Attendance: 1,816
Referee: Devarly do Rosário

22 April 2017
16:30 UTC–4

Itapemirim	2-1	Doze
Marcos Felipe 67'; Wendell 76'	Report	57' Cássio

Estádio Sumaré, Cachoeiro de Itapemirim
Attendance: 1,816
Referee: Dyorgenes Padovani

Itapemirim win 4-3 on aggregate. Itapemirim win the 2017 Campeonato Capixaba

== Top Scorers ==
As of 4 November 2017

Rank	Player	Club	Goals
1.	(Brazil) Márcio Carioca	Rio Branco	6
1.	(Brazil) Wendell	Itapemirim	6
2.	(Brazil) Hércules	Vitória-ES	5
2.	(Brazil) Lambiru	Tupy	5
2.	(Brazil) Nilo	Doze	5
2.	(Brazil) Rael	Desportiva Ferroviária	5
3.	(Brazil) Chiquinho	Doze	4
4.	(Brazil) Cássio	Doze	3
4.	(Brazil) Gugu	Real Noroeste	3
4.	(Brazil) Paulinho Pimentel	São Mateus	3
4.	(Brazil) Weliton	Itapemirim	3
4.	(Brazil) Zizu	Itapemirim	3

Campeonato Capixaba
2017 Champion
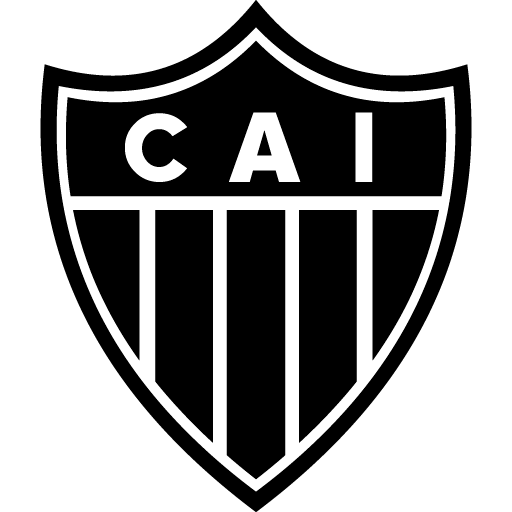

Itapemirim
8th Title

Itapemirim qualifies for the 2018 Campeonato Brasileiro Série D.
Itapemirim qualifies for the 2018 Copa Do Brasil.
Itapemirim qualifies for the 2018 Copa Verde.
