= Petróleo (footballer, born 1993) =

Brazilian footballer (born 1993)

Personal information
- Full name: Weverton da Silva Jacinto
- Date of birth: 25 August 1993 (age 33)
- Place of birth: Serra, Brazil
- Height: 1.89 m (6 ft 2 in)
- Position: Centre-back

Youth career
- –2015: Rio Branco-ES

Senior career*
Years	Team	Apps	(Gls)
2014–2021	Rio Branco-ES		
2019	→ Desportiva-ES (loan)		
2020	→ Rio Branco-VN (loan)		
2020	→ Boston River (loan)		
2022	Unaí		
2022	CTE Colatina		
2022	Castelo		
2023	Tupy-ES		
- * Club domestic league appearances and goals as of 12 January 2024

Weverton da Silva Jacinto (born 25 August 1993), better known as Petróleo is a Brazilian former professional footballer who played as a centre-back.

== Career ==
Formed in the youth categories of Rio Branco AC, Petróleo played for the club for most of his career, being state champion in 2015 and Copa ES in 2016. He was loaned to Desportiva in 2019 and to Boston River in Uruguay in 2020. In 2021 he became a hero of the club's classification against Sampaio Corrêa in the 2021 Copa do Brasil, but in July of the same year his contract was terminated after getting involved in a fight with a supporter carrying a knife. His last club was Tupy-ES.

== Honours ==
Rio Branco

- Campeonato Capixaba: 2015
- Copa ES: 2016
