= 2014 Campeonato Capixaba =

Campeonato Capixaba
- Season: 2014
- Dates: 17 January – 7 June 2014
- Champions: Estrela do Norte (1st title)
- Relegated: Botafogo de Jaguaré
- Série D: Estrela do Norte
- Copa do Brasil: Estrela do Norte
- Copa Verde: Estrela do Norte
- Matches: 96
- Goals: 197 (2.05 per match)
- Top goalscorer: Madison Leppaus (Castelo); Geraldo Filho (Estrela do Norte) (10 goals each)

The 2014 Campeonato Capixaba was the 98th edition of Espírito Santo's top professional football league organized by FES. The competition started on January 17 and ended on June 7.

== Format ==
In the league stage, all 9 teams face each other twice, once at home and once at away. The top four teams advance to the knockout stage semi-finals and the bottom-placed team is relegated. In the knockout stage, the semi-finals and finals will be played over two legs, with the higher-ranked team in the first stage are the home team of the second leg and have the advantage of the draw in the sum of the scores.

== League stage ==
Pos	Team	Pld	W	D	L	GF	GA	GD	Pts	Qualification or relegation
1	Linhares	16	9	3	4	28	17	+11	30	Advance to Semi-finals
2	São Mateus	16	8	6	2	26	11	+15	30	Advance to Semi-finals
3	Estrela do Norte	16	8	5	3	22	13	+9	29	Advance to Semi-finals
4	Castelo	16	7	6	3	28	20	+8	27	Advance to Semi-finals
5	Vitória	16	6	4	6	26	23	+3	22	
6	Real Noroeste	16	5	6	5	20	19	+1	21	
7	Desportiva Ferroviária	16	6	3	7	21	22	−1	21	
8	Colatina	16	3	4	9	16	23	−7	13	
9	Botafogo de Jaguaré	16	1	1	14	10	39	−29	4	Relegation to 2015 Série B

Source: RSSSF
Rules for classification: 1) points; 2) wins; 3) goal difference; 4) goals scored; 5) head-to-head results; 6) disciplinary record; 7) random draw.

== Knockout stage ==
=== Bracket ===
Semi-finals
1	Linhares	0	3	3
4	Castelo	2	1	3
2	São Mateus	2	0	2
3	Estrela do Norte	1	3	4

Finals
1	Linhares	0	0	0
3	Estrela do Norte	0	1	1
