= Campeonato Capixaba Série B =

Football league in Espírito Santo, Brazil

- Organising body: FES
- Founded: 1987; 39 years ago
- Country: Brazil
- State: Espírito Santo
- Level on pyramid: 2
- Promotion to: Campeonato Capixaba
- Current champions: Estrela do Norte (3rd title) (2026)
- Most championships: São Mateus; Serra; Estrela do Norte (3 titles each)
- Website: FES Official website

The Campeonato Capixaba Série B is the second tier of the professional state football league in the Brazilian state of Espírito Santo. It is run by the Espírito Santo Football Federation (FES).

== List of champions ==
Ed.	Season	Champions	Runners-up	Ref.
1	1987	São Mateus (1)	Santo Antônio	
2	1988	Castelo (1)	Muniz Freire	
3	1989	Muniz Freire (1)	Rio Pardo	
4	1990	Aracruz (1)	Comercial de Muqui	
5	1991	Ipiranga (1)	Santos	
6	1992	AA Nova Venécia (1)	Comercial de Alegre	
7	1993	Rio Branco (VN) (1)	Mariano	
8	1994	Mimosense (1)	Matheense	
9	1995	Capixaba SC (1)	Canário	
10	1996	Estrela do Norte (1)	Capixaba SC	
11	1997	Serra (1)	Mimosense	
12	1998	São Gabriel (1)	Nacional	
13	1999	Estrela do Norte (2)	Riachuelo	
14	2000	Cachoeiro (1)	Alegrense	
15	2001	Tupy (1)	Veneciano	
16	2002	CTE Colatina (1)	Vitória	
17	2003	Vilavelhense (1)	Desportiva	
18	2004	Estrela de Cachoeiro (1)	AA Nova Venécia	
19	2005	Rio Branco (1)	Linhares	
20	2006	Colatinense (1)	Pinheiros	
21	2007	Desportiva (1)	Rio Bananal	
22	2008	São Mateus (2)	GEL	
23	2009	Vitória (1)	Espírito Santo FC	
24	2010	Aracruz (2)	Estrela do Norte	
25	2011	Botafogo de Jaguaré (1)	Real Noroeste	
26	2012	Desportiva (2)	Estrela do Norte	
27	2013	Colatina SE (1)	Castelo	
28	2014	Sport Capixaba (1)	Atlético Itapemirim	
29	2015	Espírito Santo FC (1)	Doze	
30	2016	Vitória (2)	Tupy	
31	2017	Serra (2)	Rio Branco (VN)	
32	2018	Rio Branco (2)	Estrela do Norte	
33	2019	São Mateus (3)	Linhares	
34	2020	Vilavelhense (2)	Pinheiros	
35	2021	Nova Venécia FC (1)	CTE Colatina	
36	2022	Atlético Itapemirim (1)	Porto Vitória	
37	2023	Jaguaré (1)	Rio Branco (VN)	
38	2024	Capixaba SC (2)	Vilavelhense	
39	2025	Serra (3)	Forte	
40	2026	Estrela do Norte (3)	Linhares FC	

== Titles by team ==
Teams in bold still active.

Club	Titles	Years won
**São Mateus**	3	1987, 2008, 2019
**Serra**	3	1997, 2017, 2025
**Estrela do Norte**	3	1996, 1999, 2026
Aracruz	2	1990, 2010
**Capixaba SC**	2	1995, 2024
**Desportiva**	2	2007, 2012
**Rio Branco**	2	2005, 2018
**Vilavelhense**	2	2003, 2020
**Vitória**	2	2009, 2016
**Atlético Itapemirim**	1	2022
Botafogo de Jaguaré	1	2011
Cachoeiro	1	2000
**Castelo**	1	1988
Colatina SE	1	2013
Colatinense	1	2006
**CTE Colatina**	1	2002
**Espírito Santo FC**	1	2015
Estrela de Cachoeiro	1	2004
Ipiranga	1	1991
**Jaguaré**	1	2023
Mimosense	1	1994
Muniz Freire	1	1989
AA Nova Venécia	1	1991
**Nova Venécia FC**	1	2021
**Rio Branco (VN)**	1	1993
São Gabriel	1	1998
**Sport Capixaba**	1	2014
**Tupy**	1	2001

=== By city ===
City	Championships	Clubs
Cachoeiro de Itapemirim	5	Estrela do Norte (3), Cachoeiro (1), Estrela de Cachoeiro (1)
Vitória	4	Rio Branco (2), Vitória (2)
Colatina	3	Colatina SE (1), Colatinense (1), CTE Colatina (1)
São Mateus	3	São Mateus (3)
Serra	3	Serra (3)
Vila Velha	3	Vilavelhense (2), Tupy (1)
Aracruz	2	Aracruz (2)
Cariacica	2	Desportiva (2)
Guaçuí	2	Capixaba SC (2)
Jaguaré	2	Botafogo (1), Jaguaré (1)
Nova Venécia	2	AA Nova Venécia (1), Nova Venécia FC (1)
Afonso Cláudio	1	Ipiranga (1)
Anchieta	1	Espírito Santo FC (1)
Castelo	1	Castelo (1)
Domingos Martins	1	Sport Capixaba (1)
Itapemirim	1	Atlético Itapemirim (1)
Mimoso do Sul	1	Mimosense (1)
Muniz Freire	1	Muniz Freire (1)
São Gabriel da Palha	1	São Gabriel (1)
Venda Nova do Imigrante	1	Rio Branco (VN) (1)
