= Rodolfo (footballer, born 1989) =

Brazilian footballer

Personal information
- Full name: Rodolfo Xavier Neves
- Date of birth: 13 March 1989 (age 37)
- Place of birth: Cariacica, Brazil
- Height: 1.77 m (5 ft 10 in)
- Position: Striker

Team information
- Current team: Real Noroeste

Senior career*
Years	Team	Apps	(Gls)
2008–2009	Democrata		
2009	→ Profute (loan)		
2010	Americano		
2011	A.D.I.		
2012	Serra		
2012–2013	PFC Beroe	9	(0)
2013	Serra		
2014	Santa Rita		
2014	Boca Júnior		
2015	Galícia	2	(0)
2016	Espírito Santo		
2017	Tupy		
2018–	Real Noroeste		
- * Club domestic league appearances and goals as of 1 September 2012

Rodolfo Xavier Neves (born 13 March 1989) is a Brazilian footballer who plays as a striker.

== Career ==
Neves started his senior career with Esporte Clube Democrata Governador Valadares and joined in January 2009 on loan to Profute Futebol Clube. After a half year with the São Gonçalo based Profute, returned to Democrata. In the spring of 2010 signed with Americano FC, who played one year, before signed with Associação Desportiva Itaboraí. In January 2012 signed than for Sociedade Desportiva Serra Futebol Clube, before transferred to Bulgarian PSL club PFC Beroe Stara Zagora.

== External ==
Rodolfo on Facebook
