= Regis (footballer, born 1973) =

Brazilian footballer

Personal information
- Full name: Regis Felisberto Masarim
- Date of birth: 6 March 1973 (age 53)
- Place of birth: Nova Venécia, Brazil
- Height: 1.71 m (5 ft 7 in)
- Position: Midfielder

Youth career
- 1989–1991: Flamengo

Senior career*
Years	Team	Apps	(Gls)
1991–1995	Flamengo	8	(0)
1992–1993	→ Kashima Antlers (loan)	8	(0)
1994	→ Bragantino (loan)	10	(0)
1995–1997	União da Madeira	17	(0)
1998	Al-Arabi		
1999	Al-Shamal		
2000	Mogi Mirim	10	(0)
2001	CFZ-RJ		
2003–2005	Veneciano		

International career
1989	Brazil U17	3	(0)
- * Club domestic league appearances and goals

Regis Felisberto Masarim (born 6 March 1973), simply known as Regis, is a Brazilian former professional footballer who played as midfielder.

== Career ==
Discovered by the youth sectors of CR Flamengo, Regis was loaned out in 1992-93 to Kashima Antlers in Japanese football, and in 1994 to Bragantino. He later played for União da Madeira and the Qatari clubs Al-Arab and Al-Shamal. He returned to Brazil in 2000 to play for Mogi Mirim and ended his career playing for his hometown team, SE Veneciano.

In 1989, Regis was also part of the Brazilian squad that competed in the FIFA U-16 World Championship.

== Personal life ==
In 2021, Regis joined fellow countryman Richarlison's social project carried out in the city of Nova Venécia, aiming to find new talents for football.

== Career statistics ==
Club performance			League		Cup		League Cup		Total	
Season	Club	League	Apps	Goals	Apps	Goals	Apps	Goals	Apps	Goals
Japan			League		Emperor's Cup		J.League Cup		Total	
1992	Kashima Antlers	J1 League	-		3	0	0	0	3	0
1993	Kashima Antlers	J1 League	8	0	0	0	0	0	8	0
Total			8	0	3	0	0	0	11	0
