= Bujica =

Brazilian footballer and manager (born 1969)

Personal information
- Full name: Marcelo Ribeiro
- Date of birth: January 21, 1969 (age 57)
- Place of birth: Cachoeiro de Itapemirim, Espírito Santo, Brazil
- Height: 1.77 m (5 ft 10 in)
- Position: Striker

Youth career
- 1983–1989: Flamengo

Senior career*
Years	Team	Apps	(Gls)
1989–1990	Flamengo	16	(3)
1991–1992	Botafogo	17	(5)
1993	América		
1993	Ceará	1	(0)
1993	Fortaleza	10	(3)
1994	Internacional-SP		
1994	Campomaiorense		
1995	Mixto		
1995	Operário (VG)		
1995	Bahia	9	(1)
1997	Alianza Lima		
1997–1998	Veria		
1998	Sinop		
- Guabirá
2001	LDU Portoviejo	11	(4)
2002	Alegrense		
2004	Cachoeiro		
2004	Estrela do Norte		

Managerial career
- 2007: Independência (caretaker)
- * Club domestic league appearances and goals as of April 19, 2009 ‡ National team caps and goals as of April 19, 2009

Marcelo Ribeiro, usually known as Bujica (born January 21, 1969) is a retired professional Brazilian footballer who played as a striker for several Série A clubs.

== Career ==
Born in Cachoeiro de Itapemirim, Espírito Santo state, Bujica started his career playing for the youth team of Flamengo, of Rio de Janeiro in 1983, when he was fourteen years-old, playing his first professional match in 1989. During a Campeonato Brasileiro Série A game on November 5 of that year, he scored two goals for Flamengo against rival Vasco during Bebeto's first match against Flamengo as a Vasco player, receiving the nickname Maharaja Hunter, Maharaja was the nickname given by Flamengo's supporters to Bebeto because he accepted a very expensive transfer to Vasco. He scored a goal on December 2, 1989 during Zico's farewell match, when Flamengo beat Fluminense 5–0 for the Campeonato Brasileiro Série A. Bujica won the Copa do Brasil in 1990, but was transferred to Botafogo for the 1991 season, after scoring three goals in 16 Campeonato Brasileiro Série A matches for Flamengo. During his two years playing for Botafogo, he scored five goals in 17 Campeonato Brasileiro Série A matches, and helped his club finish as the 1992 Campeonato Brasileiro Série A runner-up, losing the final to his former club, Flamengo.

He played a Campeonato Brasileiro Série A match for Ceará in 1993 and ten matches for Fortaleza, scoring three goals. In 1995, he was the Campeonato Matogrossense's top goalscorer, with 23 goals, while playing for that year's champion, Operário-VG. In the same year, Bujica played nine Campeonato Brasileiro Série A matches for Bahia, scoring one goal. He played for Alianza Lima, of Peru in 1997, winning that year's Primera División Peruana, returning to Brazil in 1998, playing for Sinop, he won the Campeonato Matogrossense again. He won the Campeonato Capixaba in 2002 while playing for Alegrense. Bujica played for Cachoeiro in 2004, retiring in the same year as an Estrela do Norte footballer.

== Retirement ==
After his retirement, Bujica opened a football academy in Rio Branco, Acre state, named Escolinha Bujica de Futebol, aiming children from six to fourteen years-old. He also started studying Physical education. In 2007, Bujica worked as Independência's caretaker manager, then in 2008 he was hired as the club's assistant manager.

== Honors ==
Bujica won the following honors during his career:

Club	Competition	Seasons
Alegrense	Campeonato Capixaba	2002
Alianza Lima	Primera División Peruana	1997
Botafogo	Campeonato Brasileiro Série A runner-up	1992
Flamengo	Copa do Brasil	1990
Operário-VG	Campeonato Matogrossense	1995
Sinop	Campeonato Matogrossense	1998

== See also ==
- Football in Brazil
- List of football clubs in Brazil
