= Clebson (footballer, born 1999) =

Brazilian footballer

Personal information
- Full name: Clebson da Cruz Conceição
- Date of birth: 29 June 1999 (age 27)
- Place of birth: Conceição do Coité, Brazil
- Height: 1.90 m (6 ft 3 in)
- Position: Centre-back

Youth career
- 2016–2017: Grêmio
- 2018–2019: Atlético Tubarão

Senior career*
Years	Team	Apps	(Gls)
2021	Guarani-MG	8	(0)
2022	Canaã	6	(1)
2022	Serranense	5	(1)
2023	Real Noroeste	15	(0)
2023	Ponte Preta	0	(0)
2024	Oeste	8	(0)
2024	Trindade	8	(0)
2024	Portuguesa	0	(0)
- * Club domestic league appearances and goals as of 16:33, 12 July 2024 (UTC)

Clebson da Cruz Conceição (born 29 June 1999), simply known as Clebson, is a Brazilian footballer who plays as a centre-back.

== Career ==
Born in Conceição do Coité, Bahia, Clebson represented Grêmio and Atlético Tubarão as a youth. After finishing his formation, he spent a year without a club before signing for Guarani-MG on 4 June 2021.

Clebson began the 2022 season at Canaã, before moving to Serranense on 25 July.

On 7 December 2022, Real Noroeste announced the signing of Clebson for the upcoming campaign. He was named the breakthrough player of the 2023 Campeonato Capixaba by media outlet ge, and subsequently moved to Ponte Preta, but only featured for their under-23 team.

Clebson agreed to a deal with Oeste for the 2024 campaign, but subsequently represented Trindade. On 29 June of that year, he joined Portuguesa for the Copa Paulista.

== Career statistics ==
As of 26 August 2024

Club	Season	League			State League		Cup		Continental		Other		Total	
Club	Season	Division	Apps	Goals	Apps	Goals	Apps	Goals	Apps	Goals	Apps	Goals	Apps	Goals
Guarani-MG	2021	Mineiro Módulo II	—		8	0	—		—		—		8	0
Canaã	2022	Baiano 2ª Divisão	—		6	1	—		—		—		6	1
Serranense	2022	Mineiro Segunda Divisão	—		5	1	—		—		—		5	1
Real Noroeste	2023	Série D	1	0	14	0	1	0	—		1 (Note: Appearance(s) in Copa Verde)	0	3	0
Ponte Preta	2023	Série B	0	0	—		—		—		9 (Note: Appearance(s) in Copa Paulista)	0	9	0
Oeste	2024	Paulista A2	—		8	0	—		—		—		8	0
Trindade	2024	Goiano 2ª Divisão	—		8	0	—		—		—		8	0
Portuguesa	2024	Paulista	—		—		—		—		5	0	5	0
Career total			1	0	49	2	1	0	0	0	15	0	66	2

== Honours ==
Real Noroeste

- Campeonato Capixaba: 2023
