= Forte Futebol Clube =

Forte
- Full name: Forte Futebol Clube
- Founded: 15 August 2006; 19 years ago
- Ground: Estádio Emílio Nemer
- Capacity: 2,000
- President: Pedro Artur
- Head coach: Charles de Almeida
- League: Campeonato Capixaba
- 2025: Capixaba Série B, 2nd of 8 (promoted)
Home colours	Away colours

Forte Futebol Clube is a Brazilian football club from Castelo in the state of Espírito Santo. Founded in 2006, the club plays in the Campeonato Capixaba, the highest level of football in the state.

== History ==
Founded as Sociedade Esportiva e Recreativa Castelense, the club made its debut in professional competitions in 2010, competing in the Campeonato Capixaba Série B. It reached the promotion playoff semi-finals, losing 1–0 in each leg against eventual champions Aracruz.

Director Pedro Sabonete held talks about Castelense returning to Série B for 2018, providing that sponsorship could be found. The club registered for 2019, but it and Grêmio Esportivo Laranjeiras withdrew for financial reasons after the fixture lists had been published; the pair were suspended as a punishment, with a return date of 2021.

In May 2021, Pedro Artur reached an agreement with Sabonete to take control of the club for four years, renaming it Forte and relocating it to Rio Bananal due to a deal with municipal authorities. The club was registered to compete in Série B again.

Having returned to Castelo, Forte won promotion to the top-flight Campeonato Capixaba for the first time in October 2025, with a 3–1 aggregate win over Estrela do Norte in the playoff semi-finals. In the final at the Estádio Kleber Andrade, the club lost by a single goal to Serra.

On 15 January 2026, Forte played in the Campeonato Capixaba for the first time, winning 2–0 away to Real Noroeste. The team fell 5–2 on aggregate to Vitória in the quarter-finals, after drawing the first leg 1–1 at home.
