= Real Madri Futebol Clube =

Real Madri
- Full name: Real Madri Futebol Clube
- Founded: August 15, 1958 (66 years ago)
- Ground: Estádio Eugênio Menegueli, Colatina, Espírito Santo state, Brazil
- Capacity: 1,500
Home colors	Away colors	Third colors

Real Madri Futebol Clube, commonly known as Real Madri, is a Brazilian football club based in Colatina, Espírito Santo state.

== History ==
The club was founded on August 15, 1958. They competed in 1993, in the first edition of the Campeonato Capixaba Second Level. The club competed again in 1994, failing to gain promotion to the Campeonato Capixaba First Level in both seasons.

== Stadium ==
Real Madri Futebol Clube play their home games at Estádio Eugênio Menegueli. The stadium has a maximum capacity of 1,500 people.
