= Capixaba Sport Club =

Capixaba SC
- Full name: Capixaba Sport Club
- Founded: 30 September 1917; 108 years ago
- President: Daniel Costa
- Head coach: Giuliano Pariz
- League: Campeonato Capixaba
- 2025: Capixaba, 7th of 10
Home colours	Away colours	Third colours

Capixaba Sport Club is a Brazilian football club from the state of Espírito Santo. Founded in 1917 in Guaçuí, the club now is based in Vila Velha and is a member of the Campeonato Capixaba, the top division of football in the state. The club won the Campeonato Capixaba Série B in 1995 and 2024.

== History ==
Founded in 1917 in the city of Guaçuí, Capixaba SC won the Campeonato Capixaba Série B in 1995, but was financially unable to compete in the top-flight Campeonato Capixaba in 1996. Only two teams took part in the second division in 1996, which resulted in the club being promoted as runners-up to Estrela do Norte, but the club was instantly relegated back in 1997.

In 2010, the club became a corporation. The following year, it withdrew from both the state's second division and the Copa ES, while players complained of wage delays and poor working conditions.

Relocated to Vargem Alta while training in Castelo due to rain damage, Capixaba SC returned to Série B in 2020. Its first fixture, against Pinheiros Futebol Clube, was declared a 3–0 walkover loss as the club had not registered its players in time. After the COVID-19 break, the club relocated to Nova Venécia. Finishing third of five teams, the club made the playoffs, drawing 1–1 on aggregate with Vilavelhense who advanced due to better seeding.

In 2024, Capixaba SC won promotion back to the top flight and then defeated Vilavelhense 1–0 in the final for the Série B title. The club won a prize of R$35,000 for the feat.

Capixaba SC prepared for a return to the top flight by hiring Portuguese manager João Carlos Moura from Atlético-CE. He was dismissed a week before opening day, and later accused club president Daniel Costa of interfering in selections. In the 2025 Campeonato Capixaba, the club finished 5th of 10 teams and lost the quarter-final 3–1 on aggregate to Rio Branco.

In January 2026, Capixaba signed Bruno, a goalkeeper convicted of the murder of his girlfriend in 2013 and released on licence in 2023. He was dismissed soon after his signing due to complaints about the facilities and delayed wages, which the club denied. The club finished the 2026 Campeonato Capixaba in 9th of 10 clubs, having won three and drawn one of nine games, and was relegated.
