= Muniz Freire =

Muniz Freire may refer to:

- Muniz Freire, Espírito Santo, a municipality in Brazil
  - Muniz Freire Futebol Clube
- José de Melo Carvalho Muniz Freire (1861–1918), Brazilian politician
