= Associação Atlética Nova Venécia =

Nova Venécia
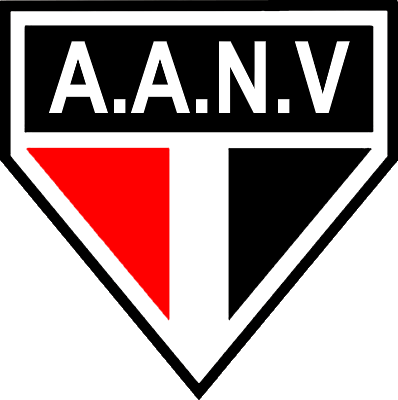
- Full name: Associação Atlética Nova Venécia
- Nickname(s): Tricolor Veneciano
- Founded: March 25, 1983
- Dissolved: June 14, 2001
- Ground: Estádio Zenor Pedrosa Rocha, Nova Venécia, Espírito Santo state, Brazil
- Capacity: 2,000
Home colours	Away colours

Associação Atlética Nova Venécia, commonly known as Nova Venécia, was a Brazilian football club based in Nova Venécia, Espírito Santo state.

== History ==
The club was founded on March 25, 1983. Nova Venécia won the Campeonato Capixaba Second Level in 1992. The club merged with Leão de São Marcos Esporte Clube and Veneciano Futebol Clube on June 14, 2001 to former Sociedade Esportiva Veneciano.

== Achievements ==
- Campeonato Capixaba Série B:
  - Winners (1): 1992

== Stadium ==
Associação Atlética Nova Venécia play their home games at Estádio Zenor Pedrosa Rocha. The stadium has a maximum capacity of 2,000 people.
