= Nova Venécia Futebol Clube =

Brazilian association football club based in Nova Venécia, Espírito Santo, Brazil

Nova Venécia
- Full name: Nova Venécia Futebol Clube
- Nickname: Leão do Norte (Northern Lion)
- Founded: 27 April 2021; 4 years ago
- Ground: Estádio Zenor Pedrosa Rocha
- Capacity: 2,000
- President: Antônio Marcos de Andrade
- Head coach: Cássio Barros
- League: Campeonato Capixaba Série B
- 2025: Capixaba, 9th of 10 (relegated)
Home colors	Away colors	Third colors

Nova Venécia Futebol Clube, commonly referred to as Nova Venécia, is a Brazilian professional club based in Nova Venécia, Espírito Santo founded on 27 April 2021. It competes in the Campeonato Brasileiro Série D, the fourth tier of Brazilian football, as well as in the Campeonato Capixaba, the top flight of the Espírito Santo state football league.

Richarlison is one of the team's ambassadors, lending his image for marketing and sponsorship actions.

== Honours ==
- Campeonato Capixaba
  - Runners-up (1): 2023
- Copa ES
  - Winners (1): 2021
- Campeonato Capixaba Série B
  - Winners (1): 2021
