= Centro de Treinamento Edmílson Colatina Futebol Clube =

CTE Colatina
- Full name: Centro de Treinamento Edmílson Colatina Futebol Clube
- Nickname: CTE
- Founded: June 5, 1998
- Ground: Estádio Justiniano de Melo e Silva, Colatina, Espírito Santo state, Brazil; Estádio João Pimenta, Colatina, Espírito Santo state, Brazil
- Capacity: 12,000 (Estádio Justiniano de Melo e Silva) and 5,000 (Estádio João Pimenta)
- President: Edmílson Gonçalves Pimenta
- Head Coach: Paulo César Caroço
Home colors	Away colors

Centro de Treinamento Edmílson Colatina Futebol Clube, commonly known as CTE Colatina, is a Brazilian football team based in Colatina, Espírito Santo state. They competed in the Série A once and competed in the Copa do Brasil twice. The club was formerly known as Espírito Santo Sociedade Esportiva.

== History ==
The club was founded on June 5, 1998 as Centro de Treinamento Edmílson Colatina Futebol Clube. They won the Campeonato Capixaba Second Level in 2002. CTE Colatina competed again in the Copa do Brasil in 2004, when they were eliminated in the First Round by Vitória. The club was renamed to Espírito Santo Sociedade Esportiva in July 2011, and played in the Copa Espírito Santo using that name.

== Achievements ==
- Campeonato Capixaba Série B
  - Winners (1): 2002

== Stadium ==
Espírito Santo Sociedade Esportiva plays at Estádio Justiniano de Melo e Silva. The stadium has a maximum capacity of 12,000 people. Centro de Treinamento Edmílson Colatina Futebol Clube also play their home games at Estádio João Pimenta. The stadium has a maximum capacity of 5,000 people.
