= Sociedade Esportiva Veneciano =

Veneciano
- Full name: Sociedade Esportiva Veneciano
- Founded: June 14, 2001
- Dissolved: 2005
- Ground: Estádio Zenor Pedrosa Rocha, Nova Venécia, Espírito Santo state, Brazil
- Capacity: 2,000
Home colours	Away colours

Sociedade Esportiva Veneciano, commonly known as Veneciano, was a Brazilian football club based in Nova Venécia, Espírito Santo state.

== History ==
The club was founded on June 14, 2001, after the merger of Leão de São Marcos Esporte Clube, Associação Atlética Nova Venécia and Veneciano Futebol Clube. They finished in the second position in the Campeonato Capixaba Second Level in 2001, losing the competition to Tupy.

== Stadium ==
Sociedade Esportiva Veneciano play their home games at Estádio Zenor Pedrosa Rocha. The stadium has a maximum capacity of 2,000 people.
