= Muniz Freire Futebol Clube =

Muniz Freire
- Full name: Muniz Freire Futebol Clube
- Founded: May 1, 1930
- Dissolved: 1998
- Ground: Estádio José Ibrahim Nicolau, Muniz Freire, Espírito Santo state, Brazil
- Capacity: 5,000
Home colours	Away colours

Muniz Freire Futebol Clube, commonly known as Muniz Freire, was a Brazilian football club based in Muniz Freire, Espírito Santo state. They competed in the Copa do Brasil once.

== History ==
The club was founded on May 1, 1930. Muniz Freire won the Campeonato Capixaba Second Level in 1989, and the Campeonato Capixaba in 1991. They competed in the Copa do Brasil in 1992, when they were eliminated in the First Stage by Internacional. The club eventually folded.

== Achievements ==
- Campeonato Capixaba:
  - Winners (1): 1991
- Campeonato Capixaba Série B:
  - Winners (1): 1989

== Stadium ==
Muniz Freire Futebol Clube played their home games at Estádio José Ibrahim Nicolau. The stadium has a maximum capacity of 5,000 people.
