= Estádio Joaquim Calmon =

Coordinates: 19.3950°S 40.0639°W

- Estádio do América
- Interactive map of Estádio Joaquim Calmon
- Full name: Estádio Joaquim Calmon
- Location: Linhares, Espírito Santo, Brazil
- Owner: América de Linhares
- Capacity: 2,000
- Surface: Grass

Tenant
- Linhares Futebol Clube

Estádio Joaquim Calmon is a sports stadium in Linhares, Espírito Santo, Brazil.

It is the home of Linhares Futebol Clube.
