= Copa ES =

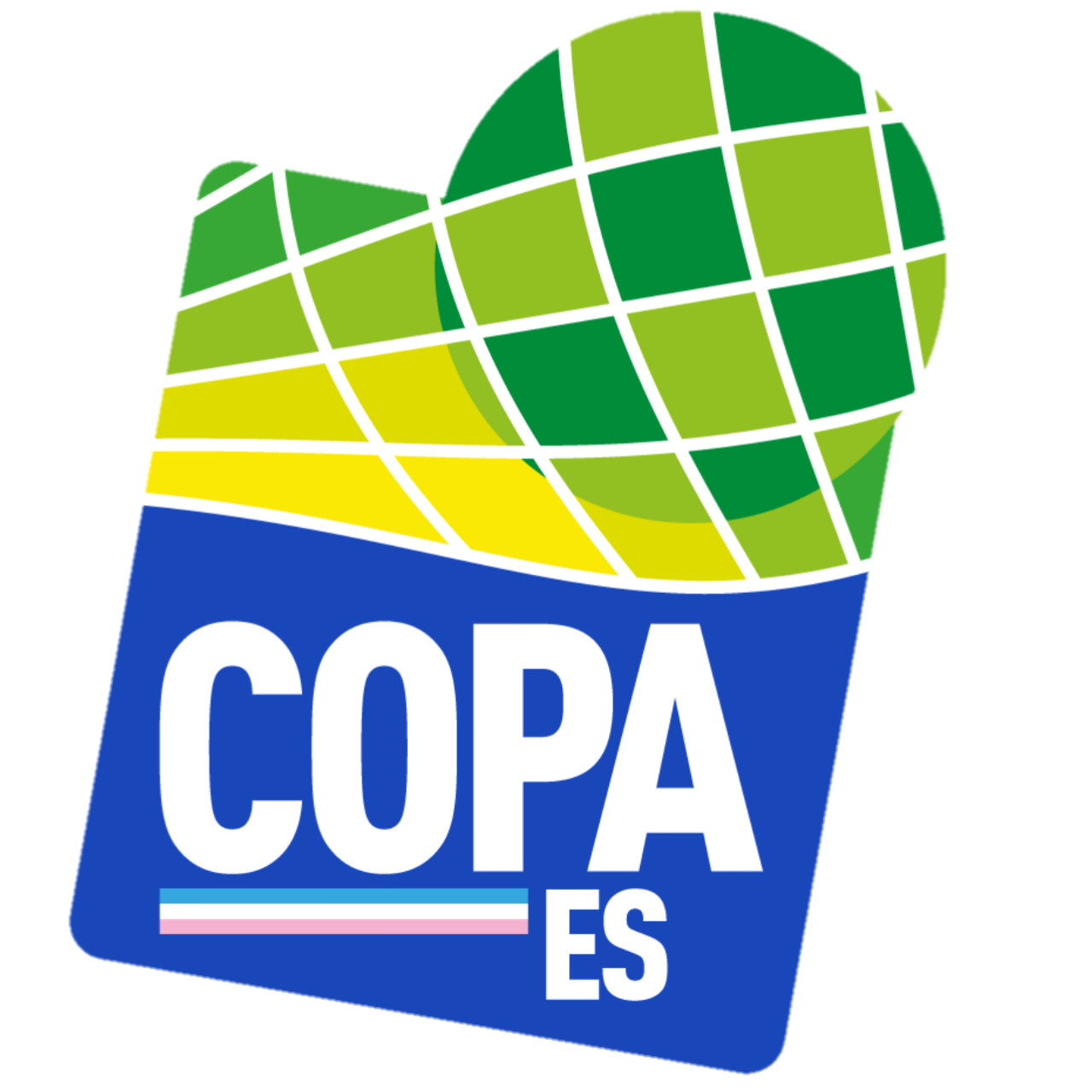
- Organiser(s): FES
- Founded: 2003; 23 years ago
- Region: Espírito Santo, Brazil
- Qualifier for: Campeonato Brasileiro Série D (winner); Copa Centro-Oeste (runner-up)
- Related competitions: Campeonato Capixaba
- Current champions: Rio Branco-VN (1st title) (2026)
- Most championships: Vitória (5 titles)
- Website: Official website

The Copa ES, also known as Copa Espírito Santo (English: Espírito Santo Cup), is a Brazilian football competition contested in the second semester of the year by Espírito Santo state teams. The winner and runner-up gets a spot in the following year's Campeonato Brasileiro Série D and the Copa Centro-Oeste, respectively.

== List of champions ==
Ed.	Season	Champions	Runners-up	Ref.
1	2003	Estrela do Norte (1)	Rio Branco	
2	2004	Estrela do Norte (2)	Vitória	
3	2005	Estrela do Norte (3)	Jaguaré	
4	2006	Vilavelhense (1)	Estrela do Norte	
5	2007	Jaguaré (1)	Vilavelhense	
6	2008	Desportiva Ferroviária (1)	Rio Branco	
7	2009	Vitória (1)	Rio Branco	
8	2010	Vitória (2)	Real Noroeste	
9	2011	Real Noroeste (1)	Desportiva Ferroviária	
10	2012	Desportiva (2)	Rio Branco	
11	2013	Real Noroeste (2)	Cachoeiro	
12	2014	Real Noroeste (3)	Cachoeiro	
13	2015	Espírito Santo FC (1)	Real Noroeste	
14	2016	Rio Branco (1)	Espírito Santo FC	
15	2017	Atlético Itapemirim (1)	Espírito Santo FC	
16	2018	Vitória (3)	Atlético Itapemirim	
17	2019	Real Noroeste (4)	Vitória	
18	2020	Canceled due to the COVID-19 pandemic in Brazil.		
19	2021	Nova Venécia (1)	Aster Brasil	
20	2022	Vitória (4)	Rio Branco	
21	2023	Serra (1)	Rio Branco	
22	2024	Porto Vitória (1)	Vitória	
23	2025	Vitória (5)	Porto Vitória	
24	2026	Rio Branco-VN (1)	Vitória	

== Performances ==
=== Titles by club ===
Club	Titles	Runners-up	Years won	Years runner-up
Vitória	5	4	2009, 2010, 2018, 2022, 2025	2004, 2019, 2024, 2026
Real Noroeste	4	2	2011, 2013, 2014, 2019	2010, 2015
Estrela do Norte	3	1	2003, 2004, 2005	2006
Desportiva Ferroviária	2	1	2008, 2012	2011
Rio Branco	1	6	2016	2003, 2008, 2009, 2012, 2022, 2023
Espírito Santo FC	1	2	2015	2016, 2017
Vilavelhense	1	1	2006	2007
Jaguaré	1	1	2007	2005
Atlético Itapemirim	1	1	2017	2018
Porto Vitória	1	1	2024	2025
Nova Venécia	1	0	2021	—
Serra	1	0	2023	—
Rio Branco-VN	1	0	2026	—

=== Titles by city ===
City	Titles	Clubs
Vitória	7	Vitória (5), Rio Branco (1), Porto Vitória (1)
Águia Branca	4	Real Noroeste (4)
Cachoeiro de Itapemirim	3	Estrela do Norte (3)
Cariacica	2	Desportiva (2)
Anchieta	1	Espírito Santo FC (1)
Itapemirim	1	Atlético Itapemirim (1)
Jaguaré	1	Jaguaré (1)
Nova Venécia	1	Nova Venécia (1)
Serra	1	Serra (1)
Vila Velha	1	Vilavelhense (1)
Venda Nova do Imigrante	1	Rio Branco-VN (1)
