= América Futebol Clube (Vitória) =

América
- Full name: América Futebol Clube
- Founded: November 25, 1917
- Dissolved: 1952
Home colours	Away colours

América Futebol Clube was a Brazilian football team based in Vitória, Espírito Santo. They were the first club to win the Campeonato Capixaba, the top-flight Espírito Santo state league, in 1917, and then on five other occasions. The club was dissolved in 1952.

== History ==
The club was founded on November 25, 1917. They won the first edition of the Campeonato Capixaba in 1917, and also in 1922, 1923, 1925, 1927 and 1928. América eventually folded in 1952.

== Honours ==
- Campeonato Capixaba
  - Winners (6): 1917, 1922, 1923, 1925, 1927, 1928
- Torneio Início do Espírito Santo
  - Winners (4): 1922, 1923, 1926, 1943
