= Clube Atlético Itapemirim =

Atlético Itapemirim
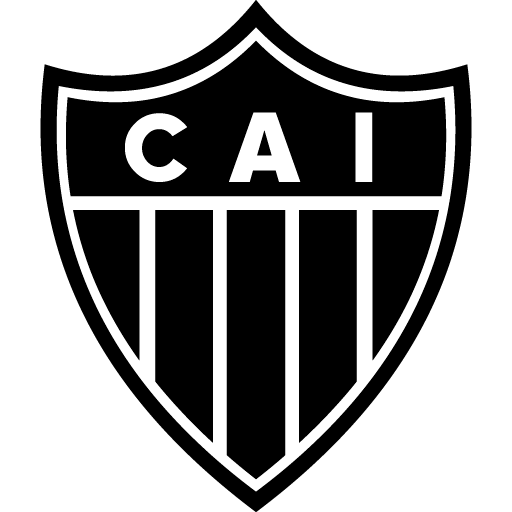
- Full name: Clube Atlético Itapemirim
- Nickname(s): Alvinegro; Galo da Vila (Village Cock)
- Founded: December 5, 1965 (59 years ago)
- Ground: Estádio José Olívio Soares
- Capacity: 2,000
- League: Campeonato Capixaba 2nd Division
- 2020: Capixaba, 9th (relegated)
Home colors	Away colors

Clube Atlético Itapemirim, commonly known as Atlético Itapemirim, is a Brazilian football club based in Itapemirim, Espírito Santo state.

Atlético Itapemirim is currently ranked seventh among Espírito Santo teams in CBF's national club ranking, at 197th place overall.

== Stadium ==
Rondoniense play their home games at Estádio José Olívio Soares. The stadium has a maximum capacity of 2,000 people.

== Honours ==
=== Regional ===
- Copa Verde
  - Runners-up (1): 2018

=== State ===
- Campeonato Capixaba
  - Winners (1): 2017
- Copa ES
  - Winners (1): 2017
- Campeonato Capixaba Série B
  - Winners (1): 2022
