= Estádio Salvador Costa =

Football stadium in Vitória, Brazil

Coordinates: 20°18′58″S 40°18′30″W

Estádio Salvador Venâncio da Costa
- Estádio Salvador Costa
- Interactive map of Estádio Salvador Venâncio da Costa
- Full name: Estádio Salvador Venâncio da Costa
- Location: Vitória, Espírito Santo, Brazil
- Capacity: 5,800
- Surface: Grass

Construction
- Opened: April 2, 1967

Tenant
- Vitória FC (1967–present)

Estádio Salvador Venâncio da Costa, also known as Estádio Salvador Costa, is a Brazilian football stadium in Vitória, Espírito Santo. With a capacity for 5,800 spectators, it is the home of Vitória FC.
