= 1992 Copa do Brasil =

Copa do Brasil 1992

Tournament details
- Country: Brazil
- Dates: July 7 - December 13
- Teams: 32

Final positions
- Champions: Internacional (RS)
- Runners-up: Fluminense (RJ)

Tournament statistics
- Matches played: 62
- Goals scored: 165 (2.66 per match)
- Top goal scorer: Gérson da Silva (9)

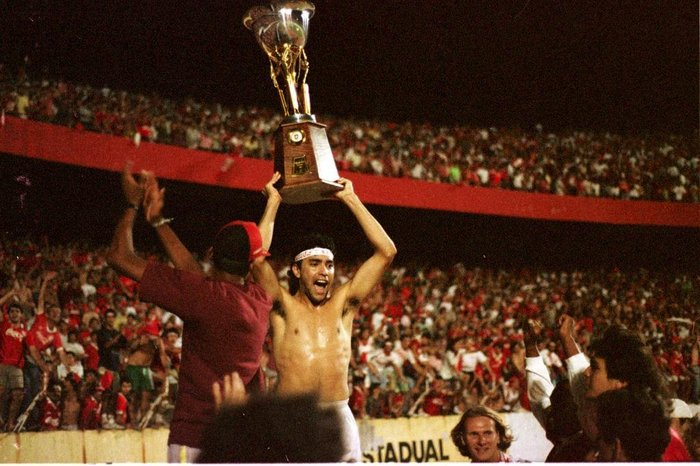
Internacional's 1992 Copa do Brasil title

The Copa do Brasil 1992 was the 4th staging of the Copa do Brasil.

The competition started on July 7, 1992, and concluded on December 13, 1992, with the second leg of the final, held at the Estádio Beira-Rio in Porto Alegre, in which Internacional lifted the trophy for the first time with a 1–0 victory over Fluminense.

Gérson, of Internacional, with 9 goals, was the competition's topscorer.

== Format ==
The competition was disputed by 32 clubs in a knock-out format where all rounds were played in two legs and the away goals rule was used.

== Competition stages ==
1st Round
1	Campinense (PB)	1 0
32	Bahia (BA)	1 0
17	Operário (MS)	1 0
16	Atlético (PR)	3 3
9	Sampaio Corrêa (MA)	0 0
24	Palmeiras (SP)	1 4
25	Goiás (GO)	0 0
8	Remo (PA)	0 1
5	Corinthians (SP)	3 3
28	América (RN)	0 0
21	Muniz Freire (ES)	1 0
12	Internacional (RS)	3 5
13	Ji-Paraná (RO)	0 1
20	Grêmio (RS)	4 4
29	Democrata/GV (MG)	1 1
4	Paraná (PR)	1 2
3	Atlético (AC)	0 0
30	Atlético (MG)	1 2
19	Juventude (MT)	0 1
14	Criciúma (SC)	5 3
11	Picos (PI)	2 1
22	Fluminense (RJ)	4 2
27	Sergipe (SE)	1 2
6	Náutico (PE)	2 0
7	Fortaleza (CE)	1 0 (pen: 5)
26	Taguatinga (DF)	0 1 (pen: 3)
23	Amapá (AP)	0 0
10	Sport (PE)	0 3
15	Tuna Luso (PA)	2 0
18	CSA (AL)	1 4
31	Nacional (AM)	1 0
2	Vasco (RJ)	1 5

2nd Round
Bahia (BA)	0 1
Atlético (PR)	0 2
Palmeiras (SP)	0 5
Remo (PA)	0 1
Corinthians (SP)	0 0
Internacional (RS)	4 0
Grêmio (RS)	0 2
Paraná (PR)	1 1
Atlético (MG)	3 0
Criciúma (SC)	2 1
Fluminense (RJ)	1 2
Sergipe (SE)	0 2
Fortaleza (CE)	0 0
Sport (PE)	0 4
CSA (AL)	3 1
Vasco (RJ)	3 0

Quarterfinals
Atlético (PR)	0 1
Palmeiras (SP)	1 3
Internacional (RS)	1 1 (pen: 3)
Grêmio (RS)	1 1 (pen: 0)
Criciúma (SC)	1 0
Fluminense (RJ)	2 3
Sport (PE)	3 4
CSA (AL)	1 0

Semifinals
Palmeiras (SP)	0 1
Internacional (RS)	2 2
Fluminense (RJ)	2 1
Sport (PE)	1 1

Finals
Internacional (RS)	1 1
Fluminense (RJ)	2 0

Copa do Brasil
1992 Winners
Internacional
First Title
