= Guarapari Esporte Clube =

Guarapari
- Full name: Guarapari Esporte Clube
- Nickname(s): Tricolaço
- Founded: June 12, 1936
- Ground: Estádio Davino Mattos, Guarapari, Espírito Santo state, Brazil
- Capacity: 3,000
| Home colours | Away colours |

Guarapari Esporte Clube, commonly known as Guarapari, is a Brazilian football club based in Guarapari, Espírito Santo state. They competed in the Série B once.

== History ==
The club was founded on June 12, 1936. They won the Campeonato Capixaba in 1987. They competed in the Série B in 1983, when they were eliminated in the First Stage of the competition.

== Achievements ==
- Campeonato Capixaba:
  - Winners (1): 1987

== Stadium ==
Guarapari Esporte Clube play their home games at Estádio Davino Mattos. The stadium has a maximum capacity of 3,000 people.
