= Richarlison =

Brazilian footballer (born 1997)

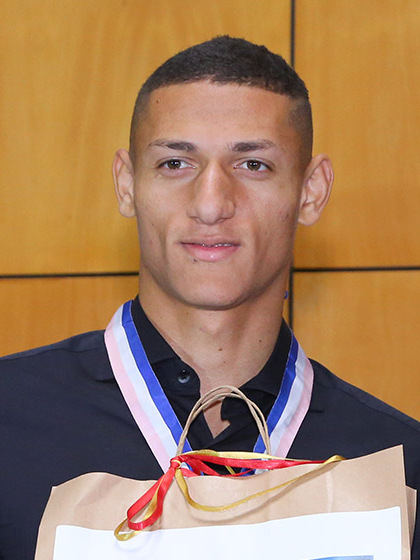
- Richarlison in 2019

Personal information
- Full name: Richarlison de Andrade
- Date of birth: 10 May 1997 (age 29)
- Place of birth: Nova Venécia, Espírito Santo, Brazil
- Height: 1.84 m (6 ft 0 in)
- Position: Forward

Team information
- Current team: Tottenham Hotspur
- Number: 9

Youth career
- 2013–2014: Real Noroeste
- 2014–2015: América Mineiro

Senior career*
Years	Team	Apps	(Gls)
2015–2016	América Mineiro	24	(9)
2016–2017	Fluminense	54	(17)
2017–2018	Watford	38	(5)
2018–2022	Everton	135	(43)
2022–	Tottenham Hotspur	103	(27)

International career^{‡}
2017	Brazil U20	8	(2)
2021	Brazil Olympic	6	(5)
2018–2025	Brazil	54	(20)
Medal record
Men's football
Representing Brazil
Copa América
Winner	2019 Brazil
Runner-up	2021 Brazil
Olympic Games
Gold medal – first place	2020 Tokyo	Team
- * Club domestic league appearances and goals as of 23:25, 22 August 2026 (UTC) ‡ National team caps and goals as of 19:16, 14 October 2025 (UTC)

Richarlison de Andrade (born 10 May 1997), known mononymously as Richarlison (Brazilian Portuguese: [ʁiˈʃaʁl(i)sõ]), is a Brazilian professional footballer who plays as a forward for Premier League club Tottenham Hotspur.

He began his professional career with América Mineiro in 2015, winning promotion from the Campeonato Brasileiro Série B in his only season before transferring to Fluminense. He totalled 67 matches and 19 goals in his two years there, and was named in the Team of the Season when the club finished as runners-up in the 2017 Campeonato Carioca. After this spell he then signed for Watford, and a year later Everton. He later signed for Tottenham Hotspur in 2022.

At the international level, Richarlison made his senior debut for Brazil in 2018. He was a member of the team that won the 2019 Copa América, were runners-up at the 2021 Copa América and won a gold medal at the 2020 Olympic tournament. Although Brazil did not advance beyond the quarter-finals of the 2022 FIFA World Cup, Richarlison's scissor kick goal against Serbia was voted the Goal of the Tournament.

== Club career ==
=== América Mineiro ===
Richarlison was born in Nova Venécia, Espírito Santo. He joined América Mineiro's youth setup in December 2014, from Real Noroeste. In June 2015, he was promoted to the first team by manager Givanildo Oliveira. He had previously been close to giving up on a career in football, having been rejected by several teams, and spent all his money on a 600-kilometre one-way ticket to Belo Horizonte for his trial.

Richarlison made his professional debut on 4 July 2015 in a 3–1 home win against Mogi Mirim. After entering as a late substitute for Cristiano, he scored the last goal of the match. Seventeen days later, he extended his contract until 2018.

On 21 November 2015, as América earned promotion to Campeonato Brasileiro Série A with a 1–1 home draw against Ceará, Richarlison was sent off at the end of the match for a foul on Charles.

=== Fluminense ===
On 29 December 2015, Richarlison signed a five-year contract with Série A club Fluminense. He made his debut on 13 May 2016 in the second leg of the second round of the Copa do Brasil, contributing to all of his team's goals in a 3–3 home draw (6–3 aggregate) against Ferroviaria.

He made his league debut two days later, starting in a 1–0 away win against former club América. His first goal in the division came on 26 June, the winner in a 2–1 success against rivals Flamengo, a game in which he came on as a late substitute but was himself taken off injured.

In the 2017 Campeonato Carioca, Richarlison scored eight goals in 12 matches and was named in the team of the season as his club finished as runner-up to Flamengo. This included one on 22 April in a 3–0 semi-final win over Vasco da Gama at the Maracanã Stadium.

That same year, Richarlison also took part in his first continental competition, the 2017 Copa Sudamericana. He played four games in the Rio de Janeiro-based club's run to the quarter-finals, and scored in wins over Liverpool (Uruguay) and Universidad Católica (Ecuador) in the first two phases.

=== Watford ===
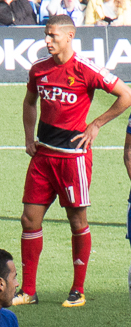
Richarlison playing for Watford in 2017

Richarlison completed a move to English Premier League club Watford on 8 August 2017, signing a five-year contract for a £11.2 million transfer fee. He made his debut for the club as a substitute in a 3–3 draw against Liverpool on the opening day of the 2017–18 Premier League season. In his next match, on 19 August against AFC Bournemouth, he scored his first goal for the club in a 2–0 win. He was the only member of the Watford squad to play every match of the Premier League season, and scored five goals over its course.

=== Everton ===
Richarlison transferred to fellow Premier League club Everton on 24 July 2018 for a transfer fee starting at £35 million and potentially rising to £50 million, reuniting him with former Watford manager Marco Silva. In his competitive debut on 11 August, he scored twice in a 2–2 draw at Wolverhampton Wanderers. Two weeks later, he was sent off in the first half of a 2–2 draw away to Bournemouth for clashing heads with Adam Smith.

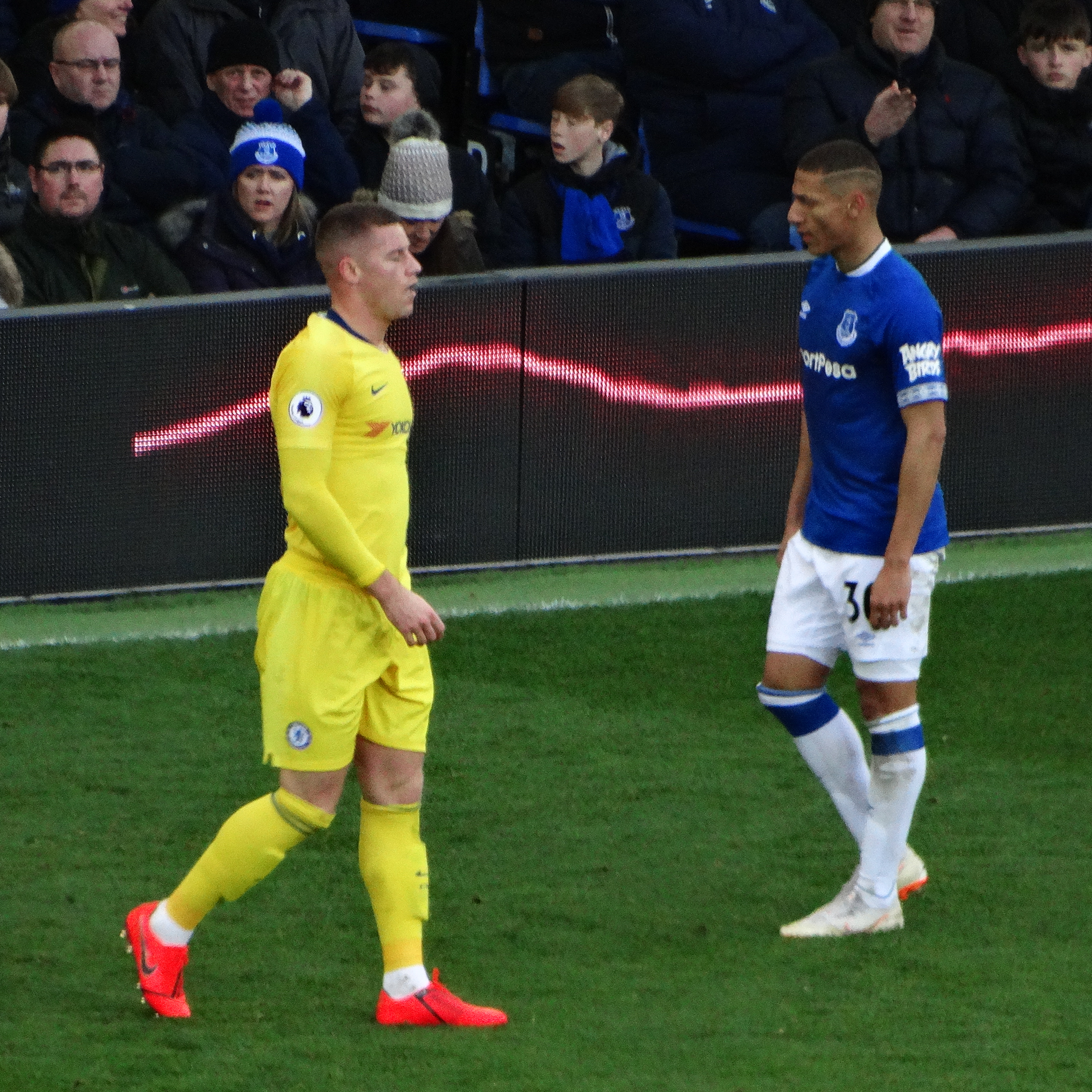
Richarlison (right) playing for Everton in 2019

Due to the poor form of fellow Everton strikers, Richarlison was deployed in the centre-forward role for Everton's game against Leicester City on 6 October, scoring in the seventh minute in a 2–1 away win. Four weeks later, he scored twice in a 3–1 victory over Brighton & Hove Albion. Richarlison finished the season as Everton's joint-highest goalscorer along with Gylfi Sigurðsson on 13 Premier League goals, while both had 14 goals in all competitions. Ahead of the 2019–20 season, Richarlison was handed the number 7 shirt. He finished that season as the club's joint-highest goalscorer, this time sharing the honour with Dominic Calvert-Lewin on 13 Premier League goals, while both had 15 goals in all competitions.

On 3 December 2019, Richarlison signed a new five-year contract with Everton. On 20 February 2021, he scored the first goal in a 2–0 win over Liverpool at Anfield, Everton's first away win over their rivals since September 1999.

Towards the end of the 2021–2022 Premier League season, Richarlison cemented himself in Everton's history as a cult hero as he single-handedly saved them from relegation, providing six goals and two assists in his final ten league outings, including crucial goals against Chelsea and Crystal Palace. The striker later spoke on the physical turmoil he endured during that period, to The Players' Tribune, stating: "My body was asking me to stop... It was my last breath, my last game as an Evertonian. A moment I will carry with me for the rest of my life".

=== Tottenham Hotspur ===
==== 2022–23: Debut season and adaptation ====
On 1 July 2022, Tottenham Hotspur announced the signing of Richarlison on a contract until 2027, subject to a work permit, for a fee of £50m plus £10m in potential add-ons. Richarlison gained his first assist for his new club in a 2–0 win against Nottingham Forest on 20 August. Richarlison's showboating during that match was widely discussed in the media, being criticised by the likes of Michail Antonio and Callum Wilson as "disrespectful", but praised by Neil Warnock, who encouraged Richarlison to continue entertaining fans.

On 7 September, on Richarlison's Champions League debut, he scored both goals in a 2–0 win over Marseille at the Tottenham Hotspur Stadium, his first goals for the club. He suffered injuries during the season and then complained publicly about not getting back into the team, prompting manager Antonio Conte to criticise him for being selfish. He scored his first Premier League goal for Tottenham after 23 appearances on 30 April 2023, in a 4–3 loss to Liverpool. This was his only league goal of the 2022–23 Premier League season.

==== 2023–24: Personal struggles and return to form ====
Just days before the start of the 2023–24 Premier League season, the departure of Harry Kane—Tottenham's record goal scorer—was finalised. Hence, there was expectation that Richarlison might take on the role of Tottenham's main striker; but by the end of the fourth game of that season, he remained scoreless. His goal-less streak followed him with the Brazil national football team in a World Cup qualifier against Bolivia, in which he failed to score and was substituted. Afterwards, Richarlison opened up on his recent personal struggles, as he revealed he would seek professional help for his mental health issues.

On 16 September, with Tottenham losing to Sheffield United by a goal, Richarlison came on as a substitute in added time and scored an equalising goal, and then two minutes later contributed an assist for Tottenham to win the match. Richarlison's assist for the winning goal, scored ten minutes into added time, resulted in a win that was once officially the latest-ever comeback win in Premier League history. On 9 November, Tottenham confirmed that Richarlison had undergone surgery on his groin. On 10 December, he made his first start since the surgery, and scored a brace against Newcastle United in a 4–1 victory. Richarlison went on to score nine goals in eight league matches between 10 December 2023 and 3 February 2024 against the likes of Nottingham Forest, Everton, Manchester United, Bournemouth and Brentford. This run of form concluded with a brace against his former side Everton in a 2–2 draw away at Goodison Park. On 5 May, he contributed with a goal and an assist after coming off the bench against Liverpool in a 4–2 loss.

==== 2024–25: Injury troubles ====
Richarlison's 2024–25 season was disrupted by a series of injuries. He suffered a groin sprain in August, and made just four appearances after his return, scoring a match-winning penalty against AZ, in the Europa League, before being injured again during a 4–1 win against Aston Villa. After returning to fitness in January, he scored in back-to-back losses against Everton and Leicester before he was injured again on 7 February during a 4–0 defeat to Liverpool.

After returning from injury, Richarlison immediately made it back on the scoresheet in back-to-back losses again, this time against Wolverhampton Wanderers and Nottingham Forest. Richarlison's performances in the league prompted Ange Postecoglou to start him in both legs of the Europa League semi-finals against Norwegian side Bodø/Glimt, and he contributed an assist along the way. He was then named in the starting lineup for the Europa League final, starring in a 1–0 win against Manchester United, which saw Tottenham win their first trophy in seventeen years.

==== 2025–26: Relegation battle ====
Richarlison scored two goals, including a scissor kick, against Burnley in a 3–0 win on the opening day of the 2025–26 Premier League season. His performances earnt him the inaugural 'Player of The Matchweek' accolade by the Premier League. The following week, he contributed an assist for Brennan Johnson in 2–0 away victory against Manchester City. On 20 September, Richarlison grabbed a goal back against Brighton to spark a comeback from 2–0 down to the eventual scoreline of 2–2. On 26 October, Richarlison came off the bench and provided a lofted header to assist Pape Sarr for the third goal in a 3–0 victory at the Hill Dickinson Stadium, Everton's first ever loss at their new stadium.

On 8 November, Richarlison flicked the ball into the back of the net for what was thought to be a stoppage-time winner in a comeback against Manchester United, prompting wild celebrations from the Tottenham players, only for United to make it 2–2 minutes later. On 23 November, Richarlison lobbed David Raya from almost the halfway line to score his first ever goal in a North London derby, albeit in a 4–1 defeat at the Emirates. On 26 November, Richarlison scored the first goal in an eventual 5–3 loss against Paris Saint-Germain, extending his scoring streak to three goals in three games. Richarlison followed this up with a goal in a 2–0 win against Brentford on 6 December.

On 20 December, he came off the bench in the 80th minute to score a late consolation goal after just three minutes against Liverpool in a 2–1 loss. On 10 January, he came off injured in the first half of a 2–1 FA Cup loss to Aston Villa before being ruled out for up to two months.

On 1 March, on his return from injury, he came off the bench to score a consolation goal in a 2–1 loss to Fulham at Craven Cottage. Two weeks later, Richarlison scored a 90th minute equaliser to haunt his former rivals Liverpool in a 1–1 draw at Anfield, earning a crucial point for Spurs in their fight for survival in the Premier League.

On 25 April, Richarlison came off the bench to provide a vital assist for João Palhinha, giving Tottenham their first win of the calendar year. A week later, Richarlison put Tottenham 2-0 up against Aston Villa where they eventually won 2-1, moving them out of the relegation zone. 2 weeks later, Richarlison scored a consolation goal against rivals Chelsea as Tottenham lost 2-1.

Richarlison ended the 2025-26 season as Tottenham's top scorer with 12 goals and 5 assists in 43 appearances.

==== 2026–27: Squad exclusion ====
On 22 August 2026, Richarlison made his season debut, starting in a 3–0 away defeat to Brentford. On 3 September, Richarlison was omitted from Tottenham Hotspur's Premier League squad for the first half of the season, with manager Roberto De Zerbi saying that the decision was not his, and that Richarlison had said at the start of pre-season that he wanted to leave the club.

== International career ==
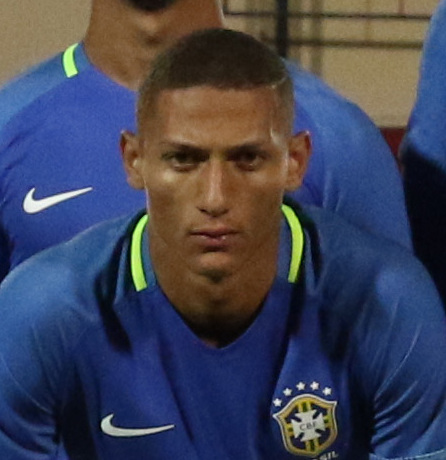
Richarlison with Brazil U20 in 2017

Richarlison was selected in the Brazil under-20 squad for the 2017 South American U-20 Championship. He made eight appearances and scored two goals in the tournament.

On 27 August 2018, he received his first call-up to the senior team by coach Tite, for friendlies against the United States and El Salvador, after Pedro withdrew injured. He made his debut against the Americans on 7 September at the MetLife Stadium in New Jersey, as a 75th-minute substitute for Roberto Firmino in a 2–0 win, and scored his first goals in the latter match four days later, netting twice in a 5–0 win.

In May 2019, he was included in Brazil's 23-man squad for the 2019 Copa América on home soil. In the final against Peru on 7 July, at the Maracanã Stadium, Richarlison came off the bench in the second half and scored from the penalty spot, the final goal of a 3–1 victory.

On 9 June 2021, Richarlison was named in the squad for the 2021 Copa América. He scored in a 4–0 group win over Peru as the team finished as runners-up. During the tournament, he also received a call-up for the 2020 Summer Olympics. He scored a hat-trick on his Olympics debut on 22 July, leading Brazil to a 4–2 victory over Germany. He finished the Olympics as top scorer with five goals, despite missing a penalty in the 2–1 final win over Spain.

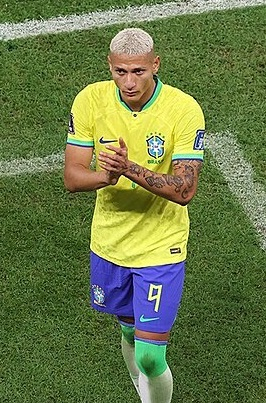
Richarlison with Brazil at the 2022 FIFA World Cup

In September 2022, Richarlison had a banana thrown at him, a form of racial abuse, as he was celebrating a goal during a friendly in Paris against Tunisia.

Richarlison was named in the Brazil squad for the 2022 FIFA World Cup in Qatar. On 24 November he scored a brace, including a scissor kick, in a 2–0 opening win over Serbia. He scored his third goal of the tournament in a 4–1 win against South Korea in the round of 16 on 5 December. Four days later, Brazil were eliminated by Croatia in the quarter-finals, following a 4–2 penalty shoot-out loss after a 1–1 draw.

== Style of play ==
Richarlison is primarily deployed as a centre-forward, though he is also capable of playing as a left winger or second striker.

He is noted for his strength, aerial ability and off-the-ball movement, frequently attacking crosses and operating inside the penalty area. Richarlison is also recognised for his defensive contribution, regularly pressing opposition defenders and tracking back when required. Previous managers such as Carlo Ancelotti and Ange Postecoglou have utilised Richarlison as a chaos agent to effectively disrupt backlines. His effectiveness is largely derived from positioning, anticipation, and intensity rather than creative playmaking; despite flaws in his game, his work rate has never been questioned.

Following his heroics at the 2022 FIFA World Cup, including winning the Goal of the Tournament, Richarlison earned positive comparisons to Ronaldo.

Richarlison has gained a polarising reputation for his personality on and off the field. His on-field antics include drawing fouls, getting involved in scuffles and provocative celebrations while off the pitch. He has a strong presence on social media, often involving himself in meme culture and even controversies. He is also known for his distinctive "pigeon" goal celebration which has been featured in the FIFA series of video games.

== Personal life ==
Richarlison donates 10% of his salary to the Instituto Padre Roberto Lettieri, a home for cancer patients in Barretos, São Paulo state and also supports 100 families in his hometown. In November 2021, he called for his fellow professional footballers to take COVID-19 vaccines and ignore misinformation on the topic, citing the death of his first coach Sebastião José da Silva. Though he did not endorse any candidate or party in the 2022 Brazilian general election, he spoke out on social justice issues such as the environment, police violence and human rights.

In March 2024, Richarlison said that he struggled with depression following Brazil's elimination from the 2022 World Cup, and even considered quitting football as a result; he sought counselling to help him cope with his poor mental health. He also urged other players to seek therapy for their struggles with mental illness.

Richarlison has been in a relationship with Brazilian influencer Amanda Araujo since 2023. The couple have a child together, born on 15 June 2025.

In 2026, Richarlison confirmed he had obtained British citizenship.

== Career statistics ==
=== Club ===
As of match played 22 August 2026

Appearances and goals by club, season and competition
Club	Season	League			State league (Note: Includes Campeonato Carioca)		National cup (Note: Includes Copa do Brasil, FA Cup)		League cup (Note: Includes EFL Cup)		Continental		Other		Total	
Club	Season	Division	Apps	Goals	Apps	Goals	Apps	Goals	Apps	Goals	Apps	Goals	Apps	Goals	Apps	Goals
América Mineiro	2015	Série B	24	9	0	0	0	0	—		—		—		24	9
Fluminense	2016	Série A	28	4	0	0	3	0	—		—		—		31	4
Fluminense	2017	Série A	14	5	12	8	6	0	—		4 (Note: Appearances in Copa Sudamericana)	2	—		36	15
Fluminense	Total		42	9	12	8	9	0	—		4	2	—		67	19
Watford	2017–18	Premier League	38	5	—		2	0	1	0	—		—		41	5
Everton	2018–19	Premier League	35	13	—		2	1	1	0	—		—		38	14
Everton	2019–20	Premier League	36	13	—		1	0	4	2	—		—		41	15
Everton	2020–21	Premier League	34	7	—		3	3	3	3	—		—		40	13
Everton	2021–22	Premier League	30	10	—		3	1	0	0	—		—		33	11
Everton	Total		135	43	—		9	5	8	5	—		—		152	53
Tottenham Hotspur	2022–23	Premier League	27	1	—		1	0	1	0	6 (Note: Appearances in UEFA Champions League)	2	—		35	3
Tottenham Hotspur	2023–24	Premier League	28	11	—		2	0	1	1	—		—		31	12
Tottenham Hotspur	2024–25	Premier League	15	4	—		0	0	2	0	7 (Note: Appearances in UEFA Europa League)	1	—		24	5
Tottenham Hotspur	2025–26	Premier League	32	11	—		1	0	2	0	7	1	1 (Note: Appearance in UEFA Super Cup)	0	43	12
Tottenham Hotspur	2026–27	Premier League	1	0	—		0	0	0	0	—		—		1	0
Tottenham Hotspur	Total		103	27	—		4	0	6	1	20	4	1	0	134	32
Career total			342	93	12	8	24	5	15	6	24	6	1	0	417	118

=== International ===
As of match played 14 October 2025

Appearances and goals by national team and year
National team	Year	Apps	Goals
Brazil	2018	6	3
Brazil	2019	13	3
Brazil	2020	4	2
Brazil	2021	9	2
Brazil	2022	10	10
Brazil	2023	6	0
Brazil	2024	0	0
Brazil	2025	6	0
Total		54	20

As of match played 14 October 2025
Brazil score listed first, score column indicates score after each Richarlison goal.

List of international goals scored by Richarlison
No.	Date	Venue	Cap	Opponent	Score	Result	Competition	Ref.
1	11 September 2018	FedExField, Landover, United States	2	El Salvador	2–0	5–0	Friendly	
2	11 September 2018	FedExField, Landover, United States	2	El Salvador	4–0	5–0	Friendly	
3	20 November 2018	Stadium MK, Milton Keynes, England	6	Cameroon	1–0	1–0	Friendly	
4	5 June 2019	Estádio Nacional Mané Garrincha, Brasília, Brazil	9	Qatar	1–0	2–0	Friendly	
5	9 June 2019	Estádio Beira-Rio, Porto Alegre, Brazil	10	Honduras	7–0	7–0	Friendly	
6	7 July 2019	Maracanã Stadium, Rio de Janeiro, Brazil	13	Peru	3–1	3–1	2019 Copa América	
7	13 October 2020	Estadio Nacional, Lima, Peru	21	Peru	2–2	4–2	2022 FIFA World Cup qualification	
8	17 November 2020	Estadio Centenario, Montevideo, Uruguay	23	Uruguay	2–0	2–0	2022 FIFA World Cup qualification	
9	4 June 2021	Estádio Beira-Rio, Porte Alegre, Brazil	24	Ecuador	1–0	2–0	2022 FIFA World Cup qualification	
10	17 June 2021	Estádio Olímpico Nilton Santos, Rio de Janeiro, Brazil	27	Peru	4–0	4–0	2021 Copa América	
11	24 March 2022	Maracanã Stadium, Rio de Janeiro, Brazil	33	Chile	4–0	4–0	2022 FIFA World Cup qualification	
12	29 March 2022	Estadio Hernando Siles, La Paz, Bolivia	34	Bolivia	2–0	4–0	2022 FIFA World Cup qualification	
13	29 March 2022	Estadio Hernando Siles, La Paz, Bolivia	34	Bolivia	4–0	4–0	2022 FIFA World Cup qualification	
14	2 June 2022	Seoul World Cup Stadium, Seoul, South Korea	35	South Korea	1–0	5–1	Friendly	
15	23 September 2022	Stade Océane, Le Havre, France	37	Ghana	2–0	3–0	Friendly	
16	23 September 2022	Stade Océane, Le Havre, France	37	Ghana	3–0	3–0	Friendly	
17	27 September 2022	Parc des Princes, Paris, France	38	Tunisia	2–1	5–1	Friendly	
18	24 November 2022	Lusail Stadium, Lusail, Qatar	39	Serbia	1–0	2–0	2022 FIFA World Cup	
19	24 November 2022	Lusail Stadium, Lusail, Qatar	39	Serbia	2–0	2–0	2022 FIFA World Cup	
20	5 December 2022	Stadium 974, Doha, Qatar	41	South Korea	3–0	4–1	2022 FIFA World Cup	

== Honours ==
Fluminense

- Primeira Liga: 2016
- Taça Guanabara: 2017

Tottenham Hotspur

- UEFA Europa League: 2024–25
- UEFA Super Cup runner-up: 2025

Brazil

- Copa América: 2019

Brazil U23

- Summer Olympics: 2020

Individual

- Campeonato Carioca Team of the Year: 2017
- FIFA World Cup Goal of the Tournament: 2022
- Summer Olympics Top scorer: 2020
- IFFHS Olympic Player of the Tournament: 2020
- Everton Player of the Season: 2019–20
- Everton Young Player of the Season: 2018–19
- Everton Goal of the Season: 2020–21 (vs. Liverpool, 20 February 2021)
