= Vilavelhense Futebol Clube =

Vilavelhense
- Full name: Vilavelhense Futebol Clube
- Nickname(s): Vila
- Founded: February 10, 2003
- Ground: Estádio Glória, Vila Velha, Espírito Santo state, Brazil
- Capacity: 5,000
Home colours	Away colours

Vilavelhense Futebol Clube, commonly known as Vilavelhense, is a Brazilian football club based in Vila Velha, Espírito Santo state. They competed in the Copa do Brasil once.

== History ==
The club was founded on February 10, 2003. They won the Campeonato Capixaba Second Level in 2003 and the Copa Espírito Santo in 2006. Vilavelhense was eliminated in the First Round in the 2007 Copa do Brasil by Treze.

== Honours ==
- Copa ES:
  - Winners (1): 2006
- Campeonato Capixaba Série B:
  - Winners (2): 2003, 2020

== Stadium ==
Vilavelhense Futebol Clube play their home games at Estádio Glória. The stadium has a maximum capacity of 5,000 people.
