= Linhares Futebol Clube =

Linhares
- Full name: Linhares Futebol Clube
- Founded: August 16, 2001; 25 years ago
- Stadium: Estádio Joaquim Calmon
- Capacity: 2,664
- President: Adauto Menegussi
- League: Campeonato Capixaba
Home colors	Away colors

Linhares Futebol Clube is a Brazilian football club based in Linhares, Espírito Santo. It competes in the Campeonato Capixaba, the top division of Espírito Santo state league. It plays their home matches at Estádio Joaquim Calmon for 2,664 spectators.

== History ==
The club was founded on August 16, 2001, after the Escolinha de Futebol Companhia de Craques, which was a football youth academy founded by Adauto Menegussi, became a professional football club.

Linhares participated in its first professional competition in the 2004 Campeonato Capixaba Série B. The team was formed by young players, but they failed to reach promotion to the Campeonato Capixaba. The club played in 2005 for the second time in the second division and qualified to play the semifinal against GEL. In the first leg Linhares won 1–0 and in the second game Linhares and GEL drew 0–0 and thus the team was promoted to the first division in the state league.

Linhares Futebol Clube debuted in the Campeonato Capixaba First Division in 2006, finishing in third place.

In 2007, the club won its first title, which was the Campeonato Capixaba. Linhares beat Jaguaré in the final. In the same year, the club competed in the Brazilian Championship Third Level.

The club competed in the Copa do Brasil in 2008, the tournament that give a spot in the Copa Libertadores to the winner. Linhares played against Juventude-RS but after a 1–1 draw in first leg at home and a 0–0 in the second leg, they lost in the penalty shootout and were eliminated in the first stage of the cup. In the same year, for the second time, the club competed in the (campeonato Brasileiro serie C ) Brazilian Championship Third Level.

Linhares regularly participated in the Campeonato Capixaba between 2009 and 2016, making some good performances, Like vice -Championship in 2011 and 2014

== Honours ==
- Campeonato Capixaba
  - Winners (1): 2007
  - Runners-up (2): 2011, 2014
