= Cachoeiro Futebol Clube =

Brazilian football club

Cachoeiro
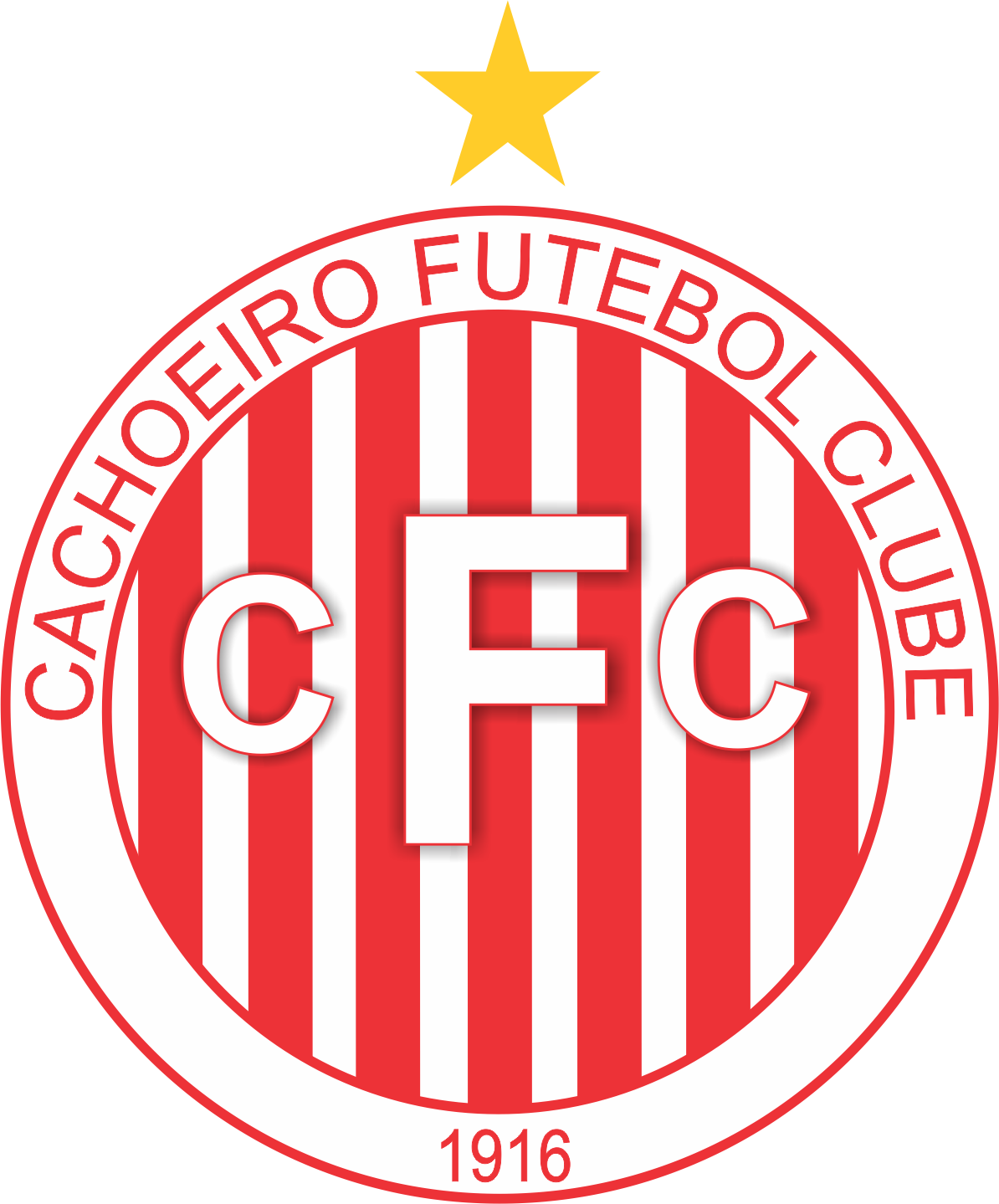
- Full name: Cachoeiro Futebol Clube
- Nicknames: Alvirrubro; Clube Fidalgo
- Founded: January 9, 1916 (110 years ago)
- Dissolved: 2014
- Ground: Estádio Moreira Rebello
- Capacity: 5,500
Home colors	Away colors

Cachoeiro Futebol Clube was a Brazilian football club based in Cachoeiro de Itapemirim, Espírito Santo. It was the first club in the interior of the state to be Campeonato Capixaba champion, winning in 1948. They competed in the Copa do Brasil once.

== History ==
Cachoeiro Futebol Clube was founded on 9 January 1916, by a group of influential members of the local elite in the city of Cachoeiro de Itapemirim. In April of the same year, the club played its first match against its newly founded local rival Estrela do Norte, in a 0–0 draw.

During the 1920s, Cachoeiro built the Estádio Moreira Rebello, which was considered one of the most modern stadiums of its time and was among the few in Brazil to feature wooden stands.

In 1944, the club won the Campeonato Sulino (Southern Championship), a competition contested exclusively by clubs from the southern region of Espírito Santo. As a result, Cachoeiro qualified to face Caxias EC, the champions of capital city of Vitória, in the Taça Estadual (State Cup). The tie ended with a 1–1 draw in the first leg and a 2–0 defeat in the second leg.

In 1948, Cachoeiro wins the Campeonato Sulino against Castelo FC in the final. In the same year, Cachoeiro became the first club from the interior of Espírito Santo to win the Taça Estadual—now known as the Campeonato Capixaba—after defeating Vale do Rio Doce (now Desportiva Ferroviária) in the final.

The club ended its professional football activities in 1974 and operated as an amateur side for two decades. In 1994, Cachoeiro returned to professional football.

In 2000, the club won the Campeonato Capixaba Série B, securing promotion to the Campeonato Capixaba for the 2001 season. That same year, Cachoeiro wins the Espírito Santo qualifying tournament for the Copa do Brasil and competed in the 2001 Copa do Brasil, where it was eliminated in the first round by Fluminense.

In 2014, Cachoeiro Futebol Clube ceased its professional activities once again due to financial difficulties.

== Stadium ==
Cachoeiro Futebol Clube play their home games at Estádio Moreira Rebello. The stadium has a maximum capacity of 5,500 people.

== Honours ==
- Campeonato Capixaba
  - Winners (1): 1948
- Campeonato Capixaba Série B
  - Winners (1): 2000
- Campeonato Sulino
  - Winners (10): 1930, 1944, 1948, 1950, 1951, 1952, 1953, 1966, 1969, 1971
