= Campeonato Capixaba =

Football league in Espírito Santo, Brazil

- Organising body: FES
- Founded: 1917; 109 years ago (as Taça Cidade de Vitória); 1930; 96 years ago (as Taça Estadual); 1962; 64 years ago (as Campeonato Capixaba)
- Country: Brazil
- State: Espírito Santo
- Level on pyramid: 1
- Relegation to: Série B
- Domestic cup: Copa ES
- Current champions: Porto Vitória (1st title) (2026)
- Most championships: Rio Branco (39 titles)
- Website: FES Official website
- Current: 2026 Campeonato Capixaba

The Campeonato Capixaba, (Note: English: Capixaba Championship. The word "capixaba" is the gentilic given to people born in the state of Espírito Santo.) also known as the Capixabão, (Note: English: Big Capixaba) is the top-flight professional state football league in the Brazilian state of Espírito Santo. It is run by the Espírito Santo Football Federation (FES).

== History ==
From 1917 to 1929, the Taça Cidade de Vitória (City of Vitória Cup) was contested, a competition restricted to clubs based in the city of Vitória.

In 1930, the Taça Estadual (State Cup) was introduced, contested between the winner of the Taça Cidade de Vitória and the winner of the Campeonato Sulino (Southern Championship), a tournament involving clubs from the southern interior of the state. The Taça Estadual was held in 1930, 1936, 1944, 1948, and from 1950 to 1953. In years when the Taça Estadual was not held, the winner of Vitória was recognized as the state champion.

From 1962 onward, the two competitions were unified into a single tournament. In parallel, the Taça Cidade de Vitória continued to be held, although it no longer determined the state champion, until its final edition in 1972.

In 1985, the promotion and relegation system was established.

== Current teams ==
2026 First Division

Team	Headquarters	2025 result
Capixaba SC	Vila Velha	7th
Desportiva Ferroviária	Cariacica	3rd
Forte	Castelo	2nd (Série B)
Porto Vitória	Serra	2nd
Real Noroeste	Águia Branca	5th
Rio Branco	Vitória	1st
Rio Branco-VN	Venda Nova do Imigrante	6th
Serra	Serra	1st (Série B)
Vilavelhense	Vila Velha	8th
Vitória	Vitória	4th

== List of champions ==
Following is the list with all the champions of Campeonato Capixaba:

Taça Cidade de Vitória

Ed.	Season	Champions	Runners-up
1	1917	América (1)	Rio Branco
2	1918	Rio Branco (1)	América
3	1919	Rio Branco (2)	Vitória
4	1920	Vitória (1)	
5	1921	Rio Branco (3)	Vitória
6	1922	América (2)	
7	1923	América (3)	
8	1924	Rio Branco (4)	Vitória
9	1925	América (4)	
10	1926	Floriano (1)	
11	1927	América (5)	Rio Branco
12	1928	América (6)	Rio Branco
13	1929	Rio Branco (5)	Vitória

Taça Estadual

Ed.	Season	Champions	Runners-up
14	1930	Rio Branco (6)	Cachoeiro
15	1931	Santo Antônio (1)	
16	1932	Vitória (2)	Viminas
17	1933	Vitória (3)	
18	1934	Rio Branco (7)	
19	1935	Rio Branco (8)	
20	1936	Rio Branco (9)	Comercial de Castelo
21	1937	Rio Branco (10)	
22	1938	Rio Branco (11)	
23	1939	Rio Branco (12)	Americano
24	1940	Americano (1)	Rio Branco
25	1941	Rio Branco (13)	
26	1942	Rio Branco (14)	Vitória
27	1943	Vitória (4)	Caxias
28	1944	Caxias (1)	Cachoeiro
29	1945	Rio Branco (15)	Caxias
30	1946	Rio Branco (16)	
31	1947	Rio Branco (17)	Santo Antônio
32	1948	Cachoeiro (1)	Vale do Rio Doce
33	1949	Rio Branco (18)	Vale do Rio Doce
34	1950	Vitória (5)	Cachoeiro
35	1951	Rio Branco (19)	Ordem e Progresso
36	1952	Vitória (6)	Ordem e Progresso
37	1953	Santo Antônio (2)	Ordem e Progresso
38	1954	Santo Antônio (3)	
39	1955	Santo Antônio (4)	Caxias
40	1956	Vitória (7)	
41	1957	Rio Branco (20)	
42	1958	Rio Branco (21)	
43	1959	Rio Branco (22)	Vale do Rio Doce
44	1960	Santo Antônio (5)	Rio Branco
45	1961	Santo Antônio (6)	União Colatinense

Campeonato Capixaba

Ed.	Season	Champions	Runners-up
46	1962	Rio Branco (23)	União Colatinense
47	1963	Rio Branco (24)	Santos
48	1964	Desportiva (1)	Rio Branco
49	1965	Desportiva (2)	Rio Branco
50	1966	Rio Branco (25)	Vitória
51	1967	Desportiva (3)	Rio Branco
52	1968	Rio Branco (26)	Desportiva
53	1969	Rio Branco (27)	Desportiva
54	1970	Rio Branco (28)	Desportiva
55	1971	Rio Branco (29)	Desportiva
56	1972	Desportiva (4)	Rio Branco
57	1973	Rio Branco (30)	Desportiva
58	1974	Desportiva (5)	Rio Branco
59	1975	Rio Branco (31)	Desportiva
60	1976	Vitória (8)	Rio Branco
61	1977	Desportiva (6)	Rio Branco
62	1978	Rio Branco (32)	Desportiva
63	1979	Desportiva (7)	Vitória
64	1980	Desportiva (8)	Vitória
65	1981	Desportiva (9)	AA Colatina
66	1982	Rio Branco (33)	Guarapari
67	1983	Rio Branco (34)	Desportiva
68	1984	Desportiva (10)	Vitória
69	1985	Rio Branco (35)	Desportiva
70	1986	Desportiva (11)	Guarapari
71	1987	Guarapari (1)	Estrela do Norte
72	1988	Ibiraçu (1)	Rio Branco
73	1989	Desportiva (12)	AA Colatina
74	1990	AA Colatina (1)	Guarapari
75	1991	Muniz Freire (1)	Desportiva
76	1992	Desportiva (13)	Comercial de Muqui
77	1993	Linhares EC (1)	Aracruz
78	1994	Desportiva (14)	São Mateus
79	1995	Linhares EC (2)	Rio Branco-VN
80	1996	Desportiva (15)	Linhares EC
81	1997	Linhares EC (3)	São Mateus
82	1998	Linhares EC (4)	São Mateus
83	1999	Serra (1)	São Mateus
84	2000	Desportiva (16)	Serra
85	2001	Alegrense (1)	Estrela do Norte
86	2002	Alegrense (2)	Rio Branco
87	2003	Serra (2)	CTE Colatina
88	2004	Serra (3)	Estrela do Norte
89	2005	Serra (4)	Estrela do Norte
90	2006	Vitória (9)	Estrela do Norte
91	2007	Linhares FC (1)	Jaguaré EC
92	2008	Serra (5)	Rio Bananal
93	2009	São Mateus (1)	Rio Branco
94	2010	Rio Branco (36)	Vitória
95	2011	São Mateus (2)	Linhares FC
96	2012	Aracruz (1)	Botafogo de Jaguaré
97	2013	Desportiva (17)	Aracruz
98	2014	Estrela do Norte (1)	Linhares FC
99	2015	Rio Branco (37)	Desportiva
100	2016	Desportiva (18)	Espírito Santo FC
101	2017	Atlético Itapemirim (1)	Doze
102	2018	Serra (6)	Real Noroeste
103	2019	Vitória (10)	Real Noroeste
104	2020	Rio Branco-VN (1)	Rio Branco
105	2021	Real Noroeste (1)	Rio Branco-VN
106	2022	Real Noroeste (2)	Vitória
107	2023	Real Noroeste (3)	Nova Venécia
108	2024	Rio Branco (38)	Rio Branco-VN
109	2025	Rio Branco (39)	Porto Vitória
110	2026	Porto Vitória (1)	Serra

=== Notes ===
- Linhares EC went bankrupt in 1998, giving way to Linhares FC which has a similar crest (based on the city's coat of arms), however the two clubs have no institutional link.

== Titles by club ==
Teams in bold still active.

Rank	Club	Winners	Winning years
1	**Rio Branco**	39	1918, 1919, 1921, 1924, 1929, 1930, 1934, 1935, 1936, 1937, 1938, 1939, 1941, 1942, 1945, 1946, 1947, 1949, 1951, 1957, 1958, 1959, 1962, 1963, 1966, 1968, 1969, 1970, 1971, 1973, 1975, 1978, 1982, 1983, 1985, 2010, 2015, 2024, 2025
2	**Desportiva Ferroviária**	18	1964, 1965, 1967, 1972, 1974, 1977, 1979, 1980, 1981, 1984, 1986, 1989, 1992, 1994, 1996, 2000, 2013, 2016
3	**Vitória**	10	1920, 1932, 1933, 1943, 1950, 1952, 1956, 1976, 2006, 2019
4	América	6	1917, 1922, 1923, 1925, 1927, 1928
4	Santo Antônio	6	1931, 1953, 1954, 1955, 1960, 1961
4	**Serra**	6	1999, 2003, 2004, 2005, 2008, 2018
7	Linhares EC	4	1993, 1995, 1997, 1998
8	**Real Noroeste**	3	2021, 2022, 2023
9	Alegrense	2	2001, 2002
9	**São Mateus**	2	2009, 2011
11	Americano	1	1940
11	Aracruz	1	2012
11	**Atlético Itapemirim**	1	2017
11	Cachoeiro	1	1948
11	Caxias	1	1944
11	AA Colatina	1	1990
11	**Estrela do Norte**	1	2014
11	Floriano	1	1926
11	Guarapari	1	1987
11	Ibiraçu	1	1988
11	**Linhares FC**	1	2007
11	Muniz Freire	1	1991
11	**Rio Branco-VN**	1	2020
11	**Porto Vitória**	1	2026

=== By city ===
City	Championships	Clubs
Vitória	64	Rio Branco (39), Vitória (10), América (6), Santo Antônio (6), Americano (1), Caxias (1), Floriano (1)
Cariacica	18	Desportiva Ferroviária (18)
Serra	7	Serra (6), Porto Vitória (1)
Linhares	5	Linhares EC (4), Linhares FC (1)
Águia Branca	3	Real Noroeste (3)
Alegre	2	Alegrense (2)
Cachoeiro de Itapemirim	2	Cachoeiro (1), Estrela do Norte (1)
São Mateus	2	São Mateus (2)
Aracruz	1	Aracruz (1)
Colatina	1	AA Colatina (1)
Guarapari	1	Guarapari (1)
Ibiraçu	1	Ibiraçu (1)
Itapemirim	1	Atlético Itapemirim (1)
Muniz Freire	1	Muniz Freire (1)
Venda Nova do Imigrante	1	Rio Branco-VN (1)
