= Castelo Futebol Clube =

Brazilian football club

Castelo
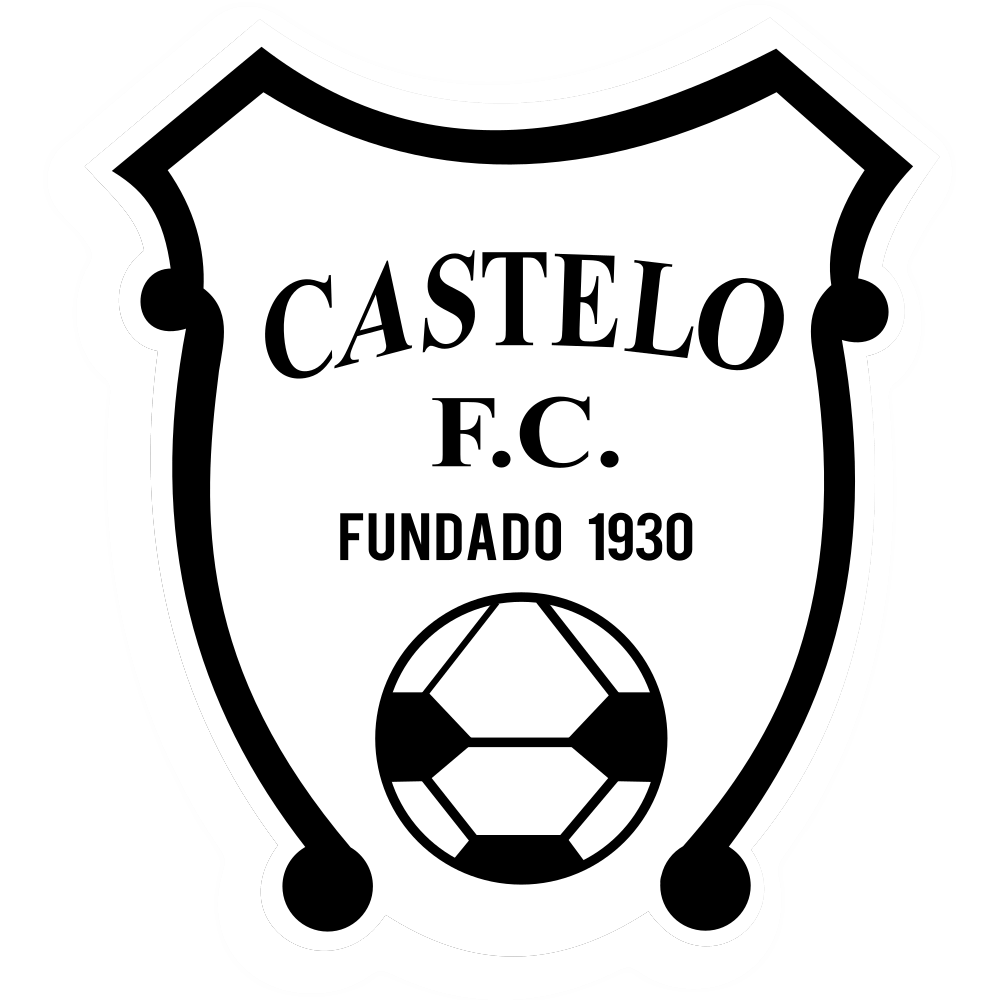
- Full name: Castelo Futebol Clube
- Nickname(s): Alvinegro
- Founded: January 1, 1930
- Ground: Estádio Emílio Nemer, Castelo, Espírito Santo state, Brazil
- Capacity: 3,000
Home colors	Away colors	Third colors

Castelo Futebol Clube, commonly known as Castelo, is a Brazilian football club based in Castelo, Espírito Santo state.

== History ==
The club was founded on January 1, 1939. Castelo won the Campeonato Capixaba Second Level in 1988. They competed in the Campeonato Capixaba First Level for the last time in 1995. The club closed its football department in 2002, reopening it in 2010, to compete in the 2011 Campeonato Capixaba Second Level again.

== Achievements ==
- Campeonato Capixaba Série B:
  - Winners (1): 1988

== Stadium ==
Castelo Futebol Clube play their home games at Estádio Emílio Nemer. The stadium has a maximum capacity of 3,000 people.
