= Alegrense Futebol Clube =

Alegrense
- Full name: Alegrense Futebol Clube
- Founded: January 30, 1971 (54 years ago)
- Ground: Estádio Benedito Teixeira Leão, Alegre, Espírito Santo state, Brazil
- Capacity: 5,000
Home colours	Away colours

Alegrense Futebol Clube, commonly known as Alegrense, is a Brazilian football club based in Alegre, Espírito Santo state. They competed in the Copa do Brasil twice.

== History ==
The club was founded on January 30, 1971. They won the Campeonato Capixaba in 2001 and in 2002. Alegrense was eliminated in the first round in the 2002 Copa do Brasil by Botafogo, and by Criciúma in the 2003 edition of the cup.

== Honours ==
- Campeonato Capixaba:
  - Winners (2): 2001, 2002

== Stadium ==
Alegrense Futebol Clube play their home games at Estádio Benedito Teixeira Leão. The stadium has a maximum capacity of 5,000 people.
