= Associação Jaguaré Esporte Clube =

Association football club in Brazil

Jaguaré
- Full name: Associação Jaguaré Esporte Clube
- Nickname(s): Tricolor do Norte
- Founded: December 5, 2001
- Ground: Estádio do Conilon, Jaguaré, Espírito Santo state, Brazil
- Capacity: 5,000
Home colours	Away colours

Associação Jaguaré Esporte Clube, commonly known as Jaguaré, is a Brazilian football club based in Jaguaré, Espírito Santo state. They competed in the Série C and in the Copa do Brasil once.

== History ==
The club was founded on December 15, 2001. They won the Copa Espírito Santo in 2007. Jaguaré competed in the Série C in 2007, when they were eliminated in the First Stage of the competition. The club competed in the Copa do Brasil in 2008, when they were eliminated in the First Round by Ríver of Piauí.

== Achievements ==
- Copa ES:
  - Winners (1): 2007
- Campeonato Capixaba Série B:
  - Winners (1): 2023

== Stadium ==
Associação Jaguaré Esporte Clube play their home games at Centro Esportivo Conilon, nicknamed Estádio do Conilon. The stadium has a maximum capacity of 5,000 people.
