= Serra Futebol Clube =

Brazilian football club

Serra
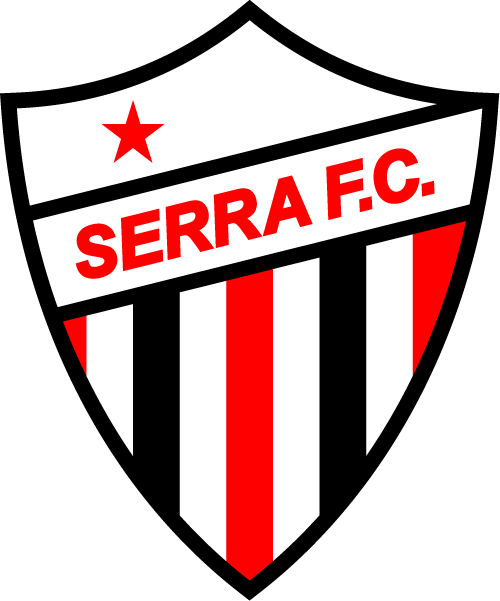
- Full name: Serra Futebol Clube
- Nicknames: Cobra Coral (Coral Snake); Tricolor Serrano (Mountain Tricolor)
- Founded: 24 June 1930; 96 years ago
- Ground: Estádio Municipal Roberto Siqueira Costa
- Capacity: 3,000
- League: Campeonato Capixaba
- 2025: Capixaba Série B, 1st of 8 (champions)
Home colors	Away colors

Serra Futebol Clube is a Brazilian football club based in Serra, Espírito Santo. It competes in the Campeonato Capixaba, the Espírito Santo premier state football league. Hosts your home games at the Estádio Municipal Roberto Siqueira Costa. Its colors are red, white and black.

== History ==
Founded in 1930, the club spent 67 years in amateur football, becoming professional only in 1997. The emergence of Serra came from the merger of Doze de Outubro with other local teams.

Serra FC won the state league for the first time in 1999, two years after its professionalization. The club won it again for three consecutive years, in 2003, 2004 and 2005. It also won in 2008 and 2018, becoming the record club of league titles in the 21st century. In 2023, Serra FC won the Copa ES, beating Rio Branco AC in the final.

== Honours ==
- Campeonato Capixaba
  - Winners (6): 1999, 2003, 2004, 2005, 2008, 2018
  - Runners-up (2): 2000, 2026
- Copa ES
  - Winners (1): 2023
- Campeonato Capixaba Série B
  - Winners (3): 1997, 2017, 2025
