= Muniz Freire, Espírito Santo =

Municipality in Brazil

Coordinates: 20°27′50″S 41°24′46″W

Muniz Freire
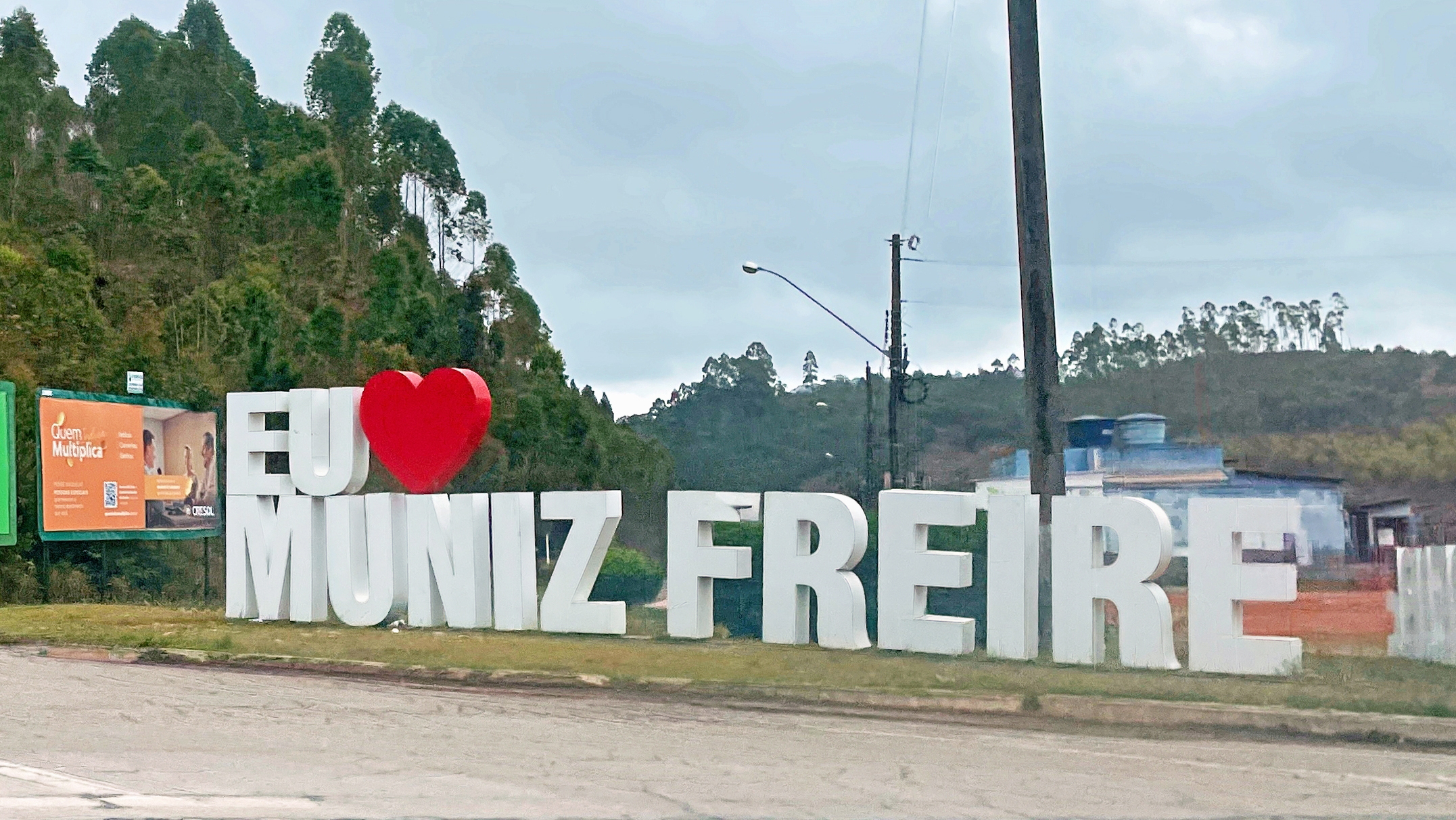
- "Eu Amo Muniz Freire" ("I love Muniz Freire") on the side of the BR-262

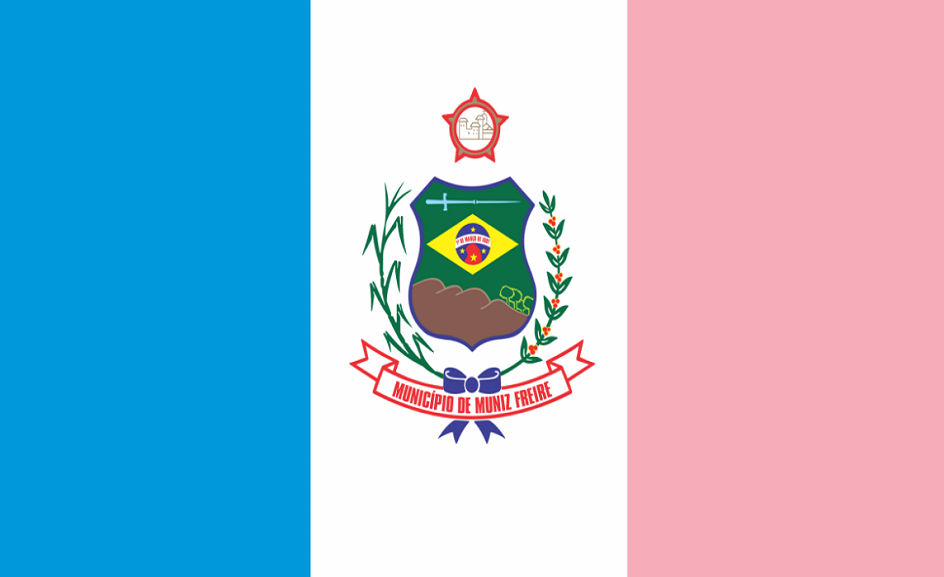
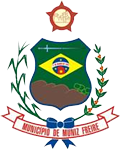
- Flag Coat of arms

- Established: 1 March 1891

Area
  - Total: 678.804 km^{2} (262.088 sq mi)

Population (2020)
  - Total: 17,319
  - Density: 25.514/km^{2} (66.081/sq mi)

Muniz Freire is a municipality located in the Brazilian state of Espírito Santo. Its population was 17,319 (2020) and its area is 680 km^{2}.

== Geography ==
=== Climate ===
Climate data for Muniz Freire (1991–2020)
Month	Jan	Feb	Mar	Apr	May	Jun	Jul	Aug	Sep	Oct	Nov	Dec	Year
Mean daily maximum °C (°F)	30.8 (87.4)	31.6 (88.9)	30.4 (86.7)	28.7 (83.7)	26.5 (79.7)	25.8 (78.4)	25.5 (77.9)	26.5 (79.7)	27.5 (81.5)	28.3 (82.9)	28.2 (82.8)	29.8 (85.6)	28.3 (82.9)
Mean daily minimum °C (°F)	19.6 (67.3)	19.4 (66.9)	19.0 (66.2)	17.7 (63.9)	15.2 (59.4)	13.7 (56.7)	13.2 (55.8)	13.8 (56.8)	15.6 (60.1)	17.4 (63.3)	18.4 (65.1)	19.3 (66.7)	16.9 (62.4)
Average precipitation mm (inches)	185.5 (7.30)	141.5 (5.57)	185.4 (7.30)	113.3 (4.46)	56.8 (2.24)	22.8 (0.90)	19.3 (0.76)	23.2 (0.91)	53.7 (2.11)	104.3 (4.11)	208.6 (8.21)	266.5 (10.49)	1,380.9 (54.37)
Average precipitation days (≥ 1.0 mm)	12	9	13	9	7	4	4	4	6	9	13	15	105
Source: Instituto Nacional de Meteorologia

== See also ==
- List of municipalities in Espírito Santo
