= Colatina =

Colatina - Espírito Santo
- Municipality
- The Municipality of Colatina-Espírito Santo
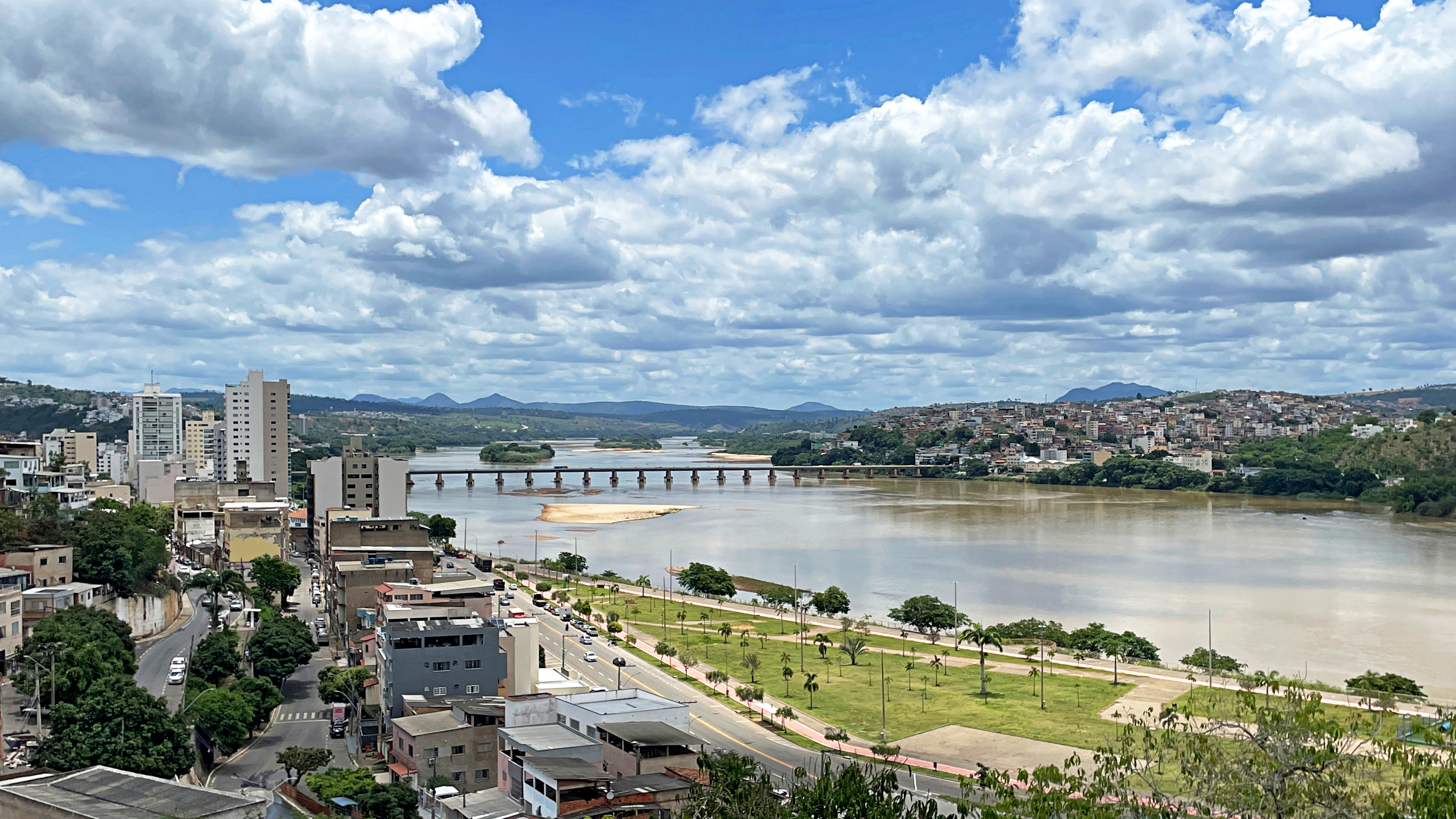
- Partial view of Colatina

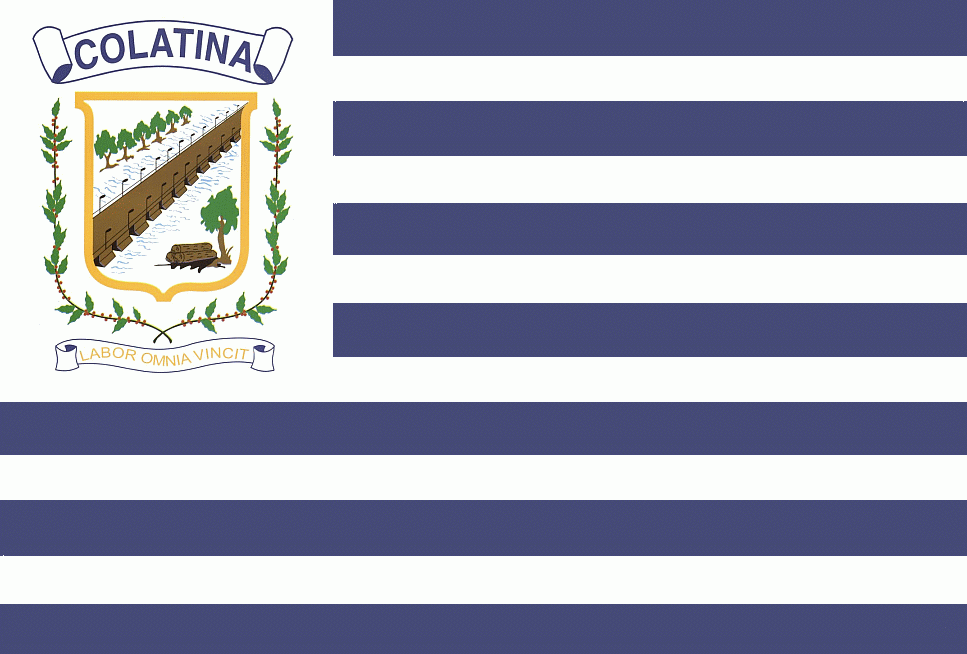
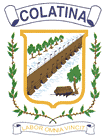
- Flag Coat of arms
- Nicknames: Capital do Noroeste; Capital of the Northeast; Vix
- Motto: Labor Omnia Vincit (work conquers all)
- Location in the Espírito Santo

- Location in Brazil
- Coordinates: 19°32′20″S 40°37′51″W
- Country: Brazil
- Region: Southeast
- State: Espírito Santo
- Founded: December 30, 1921

Government
  - Mayor: João Guerino Balestrassi (PSC)

Area
  - Total: 1,398.219 km^{2} (539.855 sq mi)
- Elevation: 71 m (233 ft)

Population (2022 Census)
  - Total: 120,033
  - Estimate (2025): 129,301
  - Density: 85.8471/km^{2} (222.343/sq mi)
- Time zone: UTC−3 (BRT)
- Demonym: "colatinense"

Colatina is the second largest city in the north of Espírito Santo, Brazil, 127 km north of the capital Vitória and on the trainline from Vitória to Minas Gerais. It lies on the banks of the Doce River, through which as much as 700 cubic meters of water per second may flow. Its population was 120,033 (2022 Census) and its area is 1,398 km^{2}.

== History ==
The first attempts to colonize the area where Colatina now lies were in 1857. 46 people established themselves in the area, which was easy at first, as land had already been assigned to each family. This proved unsustainable, though, when the Indians attacked the colony and massacred quite a number of people. In 3 years, all of the colonists had left the area, and it would be another 30 years before major influx would start up again. Until then, small advances were made along small river tributaries, which went on until 1925. Only after 1928, after the completion of the bridge over the Doce river, did more stable and sustained growth come to the region.
