= Esporte Clube Tupy =

Tupy
- Full name: Esporte Clube Tupy
- Nickname(s): Índio Guerreiro; Índio Canela Verde
- Founded: October 16, 1938 (86 years ago)
- Ground: Estádio Toca do Índio, Vila Velha, Espírito Santo state, Brazil
- Capacity: 2,000
- President: Rogério Pedrini
- League: Campeonato Capixaba Série B
- 2014: Campeonato Capixaba Série B, 6th
Home colors	Away colors

Esporte Clube Tupy, commonly known as Tupy, is a Brazilian football club based in Vila Velha, Espírito Santo state.

== History ==
The club was founded on October 16, 1938, becoming professional in 1988. They won the Campeonato Capixaba Second Level in 2001.

In 2003, Túlio Maravilha was signed to play the Copa Espirito Santo, scoring 3 goals. Temporary bleachers had to be installed on Gil Bernardes stadium to accommodate the increased number of fans who wanted to see him playing.

== Achievements ==
- Campeonato Capixaba Série B:
  - Winners (1): 2001

== Stadium ==
Esporte Clube Tupy play their home games at Estádio Gil Bernardes da Silveira, nicknamed Estádio Toca do Índio. The stadium has a maximum capacity of 2,000 people.
