= Vitória Futebol Clube (ES) =

Brazilian football club from Vitória, Espírito Santo

Vitória
- Full name: Vitória Futebol Clube
- Nicknames: Águia Azul (Blue Eagle); Alvianil da Capital (Capital's Blue-White)
- Founded: 1 October 1912; 114 years ago
- Stadium: Estádio Salvador Costa
- Capacity: 5,800
- President: Adalberto Mendes
- Head coach: Rodrigo César
- League: Campeonato Brasileiro Série D Campeonato Capixaba
- 2025: Capixaba, 4th of 10
- Website: vitoriafc.com.br
Home colors	Away colors

Vitória Futebol Clube is a Brazilian professional football club based in Vitória, Espírito Santo. Founded on 1 October 1912, is the oldest club in the state. It competes in the Campeonato Capixaba, the top flight of the Espírito Santo state football league. The team plays its home games at the Estádio Salvador Costa. The club's main color is blue and the second color is white.

Vitória has ten Campeonato Capixaba titles, and holds the record for Copa ES, with five titles. The team has already played once in the Campeonato Brasileiro Série A in 1977, and four times in the Copa do Brasil.

== History ==
The club was founded as Foot-Ball Club Victoria on October 1, 1912, at the home of brothers Taciano and Constâncio Neves Espíndula, some of the first players of the game in the city, on São Francisco street, in Vitória. The club's foundation also included other boys from the Gymnasio Espírito-santense school. João Pereira Neto was elected as the club's first president.

In 1917, the club was responsible for idealizing the creation of the Liga Sportiva Espírito-santense (LSES), founded together with other clubs, and the inaugural edition of the Taça Cidade de Vitória (now Campeonato Capixaba). In the 1920 edition, Vitória won its first trophy.

In 1957, Vitória acquired land in the Jardim América neighborhood in the city of Cariacica, where the Estádio Engenheiro Araripe is located today, but never used it. The club had also acquired another plot of land, which was, however, seized by the State Government, which granted the club another in the Bento Ferreira neighborhood, in the city of Vitória, in exchange. In 1962, Vitória began construction of the Estádio Salvador Venâncio da Costa, named in honor of the club's president at the time, and inaugurated in 1967.

Vitória competed in the 1977 Campeonato Brasileiro Série A for the first time, finishing in the 40th place of 62 teams.

== Stadium ==
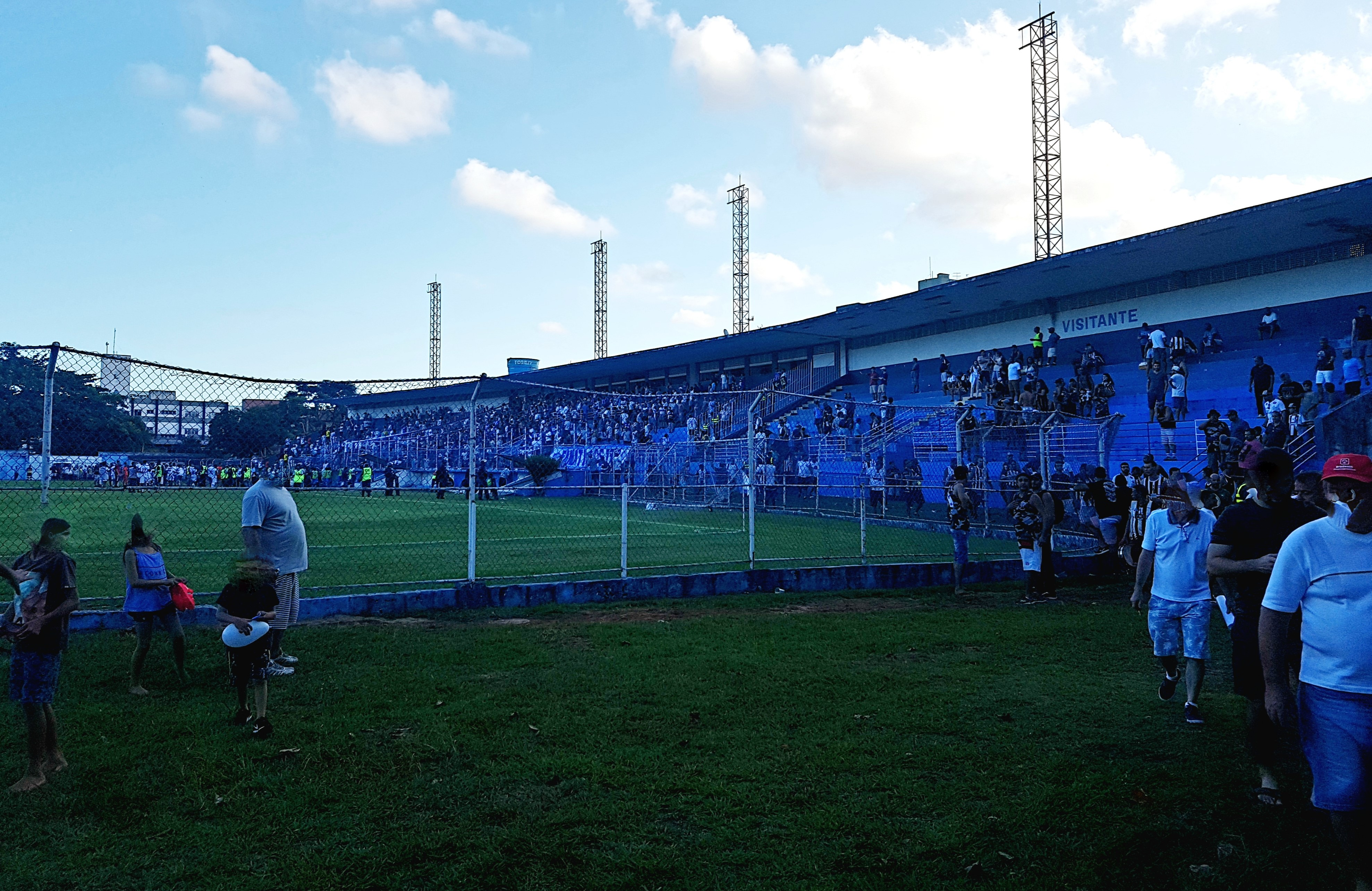
Estádio Salvador Costa, where Vitória plays its home games.

Vitória's home stadium is Estádio Salvador Venâncio da Costa, located in the Bento Ferreira neighborhood, inaugurated in 1967, with a maximum capacity for 5,800 spcetators.

== Honours ==
- Campeonato Capixaba
  - Winners (10): 1920, 1932, 1933, 1943, 1950, 1952, 1956, 1976, 2006, 2019
  - Runners-up (11): 1919, 1921, 1924, 1929, 1942, 1966, 1979, 1980, 1984, 2010, 2022
- Copa ES (record)
  - Winners (5): 2009, 2010, 2018, 2022, 2025
  - Runners-up (4): 2004, 2019, 2024, 2026
- Campeonato Capixaba Série B
  - Winners (2): 2009, 2016
  - Runners-up (1): 2002

=== Other ===
- Torneio Início
  - Winners (11): 1917, 1919, 1933, 1937, 1939, 1944, 1945, 1950, 1958, 1966, 1983
- Taça Cidade de Vitória
  - Winners (8): 1920, 1932, 1933, 1943, 1950, 1952, 1956, 1972
- President's Cup (Korea)
  - Winners (1): 1979
- Supercopa dos Campeões Capixabas
  - Winners (1): 2026
