= Real Noroeste Capixaba Futebol Clube =

Brazilian football club

Real Noroeste
- Full name: Real Noroeste Capixaba Futebol Clube
- Nickname: Merengue Capixaba (Capixaba Meringue)
- Founded: 9 April 2008; 18 years ago
- Ground: Estádio José Olímpio da Rocha
- Capacity: 5,281
- President: Flaris Olímpio da Rocha
- Head coach: Gilmar Estevam
- League: Campeonato Brasileiro Série D Campeonato Capixaba
- 2025: Capixaba, 5th of 10
Home colors	Away colors	Third colors

Real Noroeste Capixaba Futebol Clube is a Brazilian football club based in Águia Branca, Espírito Santo. They compete in the Campeonato Capixaba, the Espírito Santo top-level state league.

Real Noroeste is currently ranked fifth among Espírito Santo teams in CBF's national club ranking, at 170th place overall.

== History ==
The club was founded on 9 April 2008. They made their professional football debut in the 2010 Copa ES in a 1–1 draw against Jaguaré. They finished that competition as runners-up losing to Vitória FC in the final. In 2011, they finished second in the Campeonato Capixaba Série B, qualifying for the first division of the Campeonato Capixaba the following year, in addition to winning their first title, the 2011 Copa ES, defeating Desportiva Ferroviária 3-0 in the final.

== Honours ==
- Campeonato Capixaba
  - Winners (3): 2021, 2022, 2023
  - Runners-up (2): 2018, 2019
- Copa ES
  - Winners (4): 2011, 2013, 2014, 2019
  - Runners-up (2): 2010, 2015

== Stadium ==
Real Noroeste Capixaba Futebol Clube play their home games at Estádio José Olímpio da Rocha. The stadium has a maximum capacity of 3,200 people.
