= Federação de Futebol do Estado do Espírito Santo =

Brazilian football state federation

- Formation: 2 May 1917; 109 years ago
- Type: Sport federation
- Headquarters: Vitória, Espírito Santo, Brazil
- Official language: Portuguese
- President: Gustavo Oliveira Vieira
- Website: futebolcapixaba.com

The Federação de Futebol do Estado do Espírito Santo (FES; English: Espírito Santo State Football Federation) is the governing body of football within the Brazilian state of Espírito Santo. Founded on May 2, 1917, it manages all the official tournaments in the state, which are the Campeonato Capixaba, the Copa ES, and all youth and women categories. It represents the Espírito Santo clubs at the Brazilian Football Confederation.
