= Itapemirim, Espírito Santo =

Itapemirim
- Municipality
- Municipality of Itapemirim
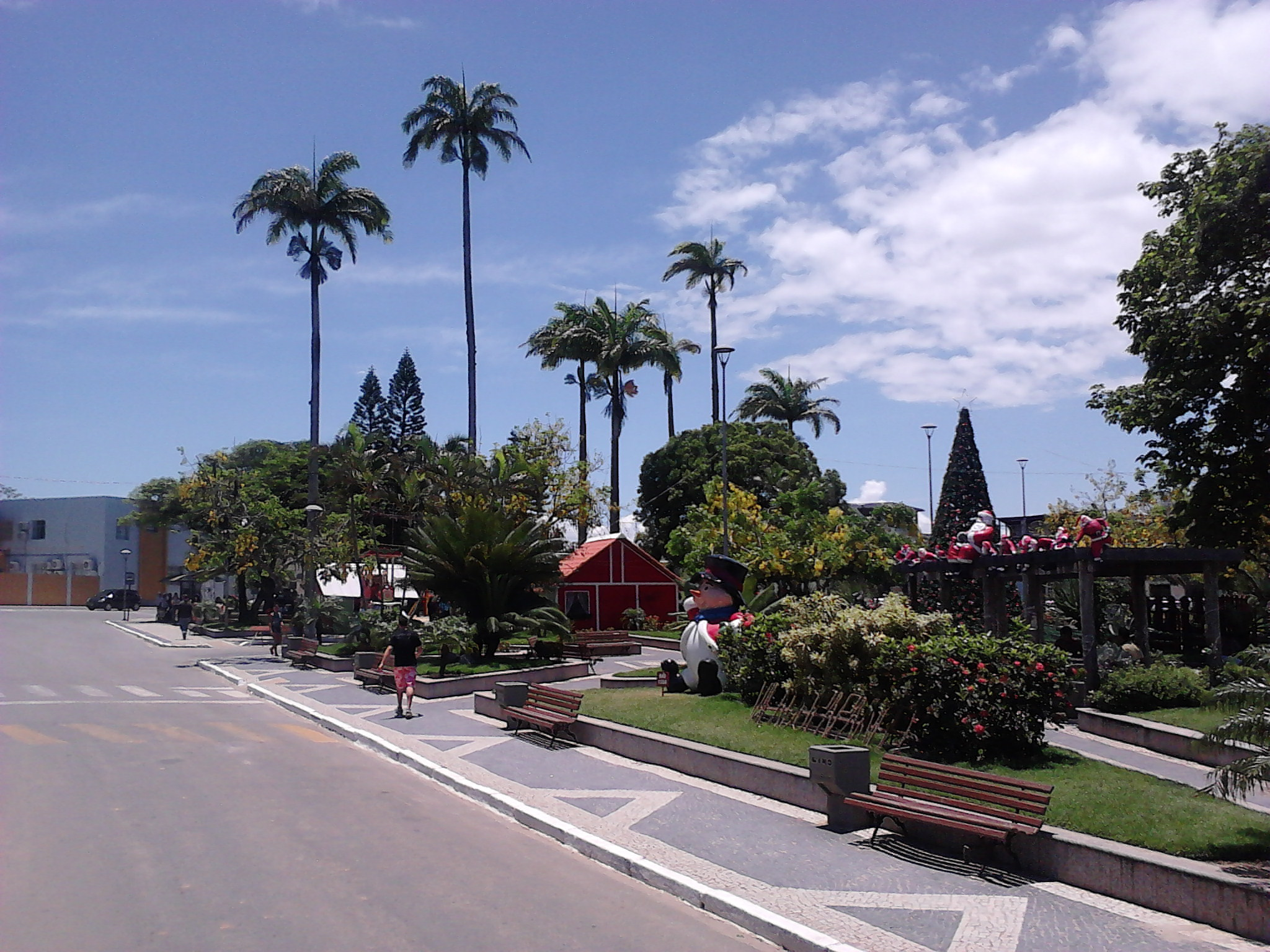
- Street scene in Itapemirim

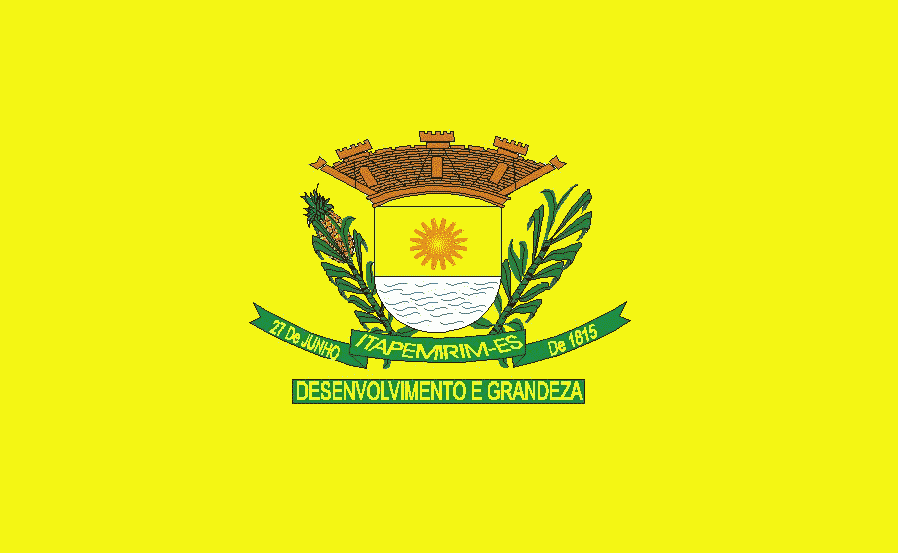
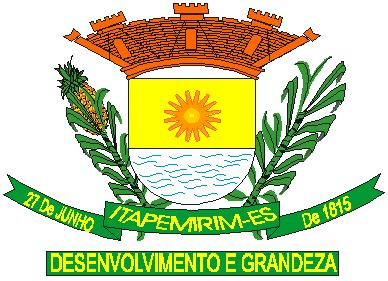
- Flag Coat of arms
- Motto(s): "Cuidar de você, nossa principal missão"
- Location in Espírito Santo

- Location in Brazil
- Coordinates: 21°00′40″S 40°50′02″W
- Country: Brazil
- Region: Southeast
- State: Espírito Santo
- Founded: June 27, 1815

Government
  - Mayor: Viviane Peçanha (PSDB, 2013–2016)

Area
  - Total: 561.87 km^{2} (216.94 sq mi)

Population (2020)
  - Total: 34,656
  - Density: 61.680/km^{2} (159.75/sq mi)
- Demonym: Itapemirinense
- Time zone: UTC−3 (BRT)
- HDI (2010): 0.654 – medium
- Website: itapemirim.es.gov.br

Itapemirim is a municipality located in the Brazilian state of Espírito Santo. Its population was 34,656 (2020) and its area is 561.87 square kilometres (216.94 mi^{2}) with a population density of 60 inhabitants per square kilometer.

The municipality contains part of the protected area of the Frade e a Freira Natural Monument.
