= Nova Venécia =

- Municipality
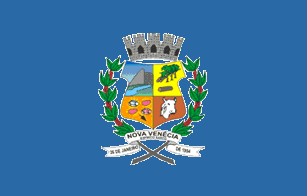
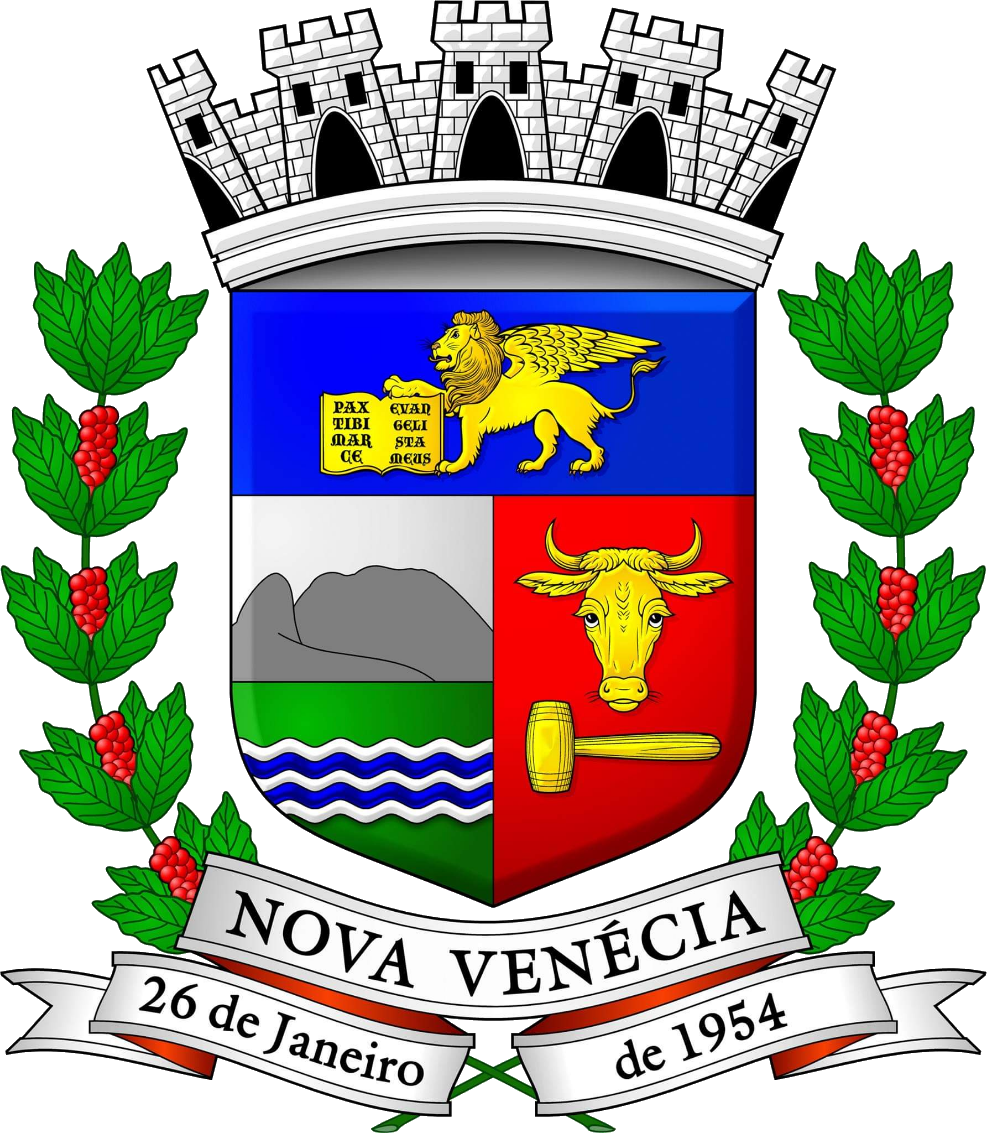
- Flag Coat of arms

- Location in Espírito Santo state

- Location in Brazil
- Coordinates: 18°42′39″S 40°24′03″W
- Country: Brazil
- Region: Southeast
- State: Espírito Santo

Area
  - Total: 1,448 km^{2} (559 sq mi)

Population (2020)
  - Total: 50,434
  - Density: 34.83/km^{2} (90.21/sq mi)
- Time zone: UTC−3 (BRT)
- Postal code: 29830-000
- Area code: +55 27

Nova Venécia is a Brazilian municipality in the state of Espírito Santo. Its population was 50,434 (2020) and its area is 1,448 km^{2}. The seat of the municipality is at 65 meters above sea level.

Founded in 1888 with the name of Colônia de Santa Leocádia, it later became Colônia de Nova Venécia taking the new name from the Italian immigrants from the Veneto.

== Notable people ==
- Somália: Former football player
- Richarlison: Football player for Tottenham Hotspur and Brazil
- Fabiano Contarato — Politician
