= List of Italian soccer clubs in Victoria, Australia =

The Italian community of Australia has played an influential role in the history of Australian soccer, particularly evident in the state of Victoria. Numerous stand-alone, merged and de-merged clubs have been formed since 1930, primarily in the Greater Melbourne area. Clubs can also be presently found in the Geelong, Latrobe Valley & Goulburn Valley areas. As of the 2020 season, the Italian community is represented in all eight competitive state leagues, with a handful of clubs competing in competitive rural and metropolitan amateur leagues. Multiple Australian national team players featured for Italian backed clubs in their youth before making their international debuts.

== History ==
The first known Italian football/sporting club founded in Victoria was Savoia, which was founded in the early 1930s. The club dissolved as a result of World War II, however remnants of the club lead to the founding of the second-ever and currently oldest presently operating clubs being Brunswick Zebras (and Moreland Zebras). Numerous clubs are believed to have taken various types of inspirations from professional clubs in Italy.

It is debated regarding which club is the most successful and has the largest following after multiple mergers and de-mergers. Brunswick Zebras was one of three Italian-backed clubs to participate in Australia's former national tier one league, the National Soccer League, with the others being Carlton and Gippsland Falcons. Then playing under the name Brunswick Juventus, the club were national champions of the 1985 season, and were Southern conference premiers of the 1986 season. Carlton would finish second in their inaugural in both the regular season and the final series, and won its first silverware in the 1999–00 season in finishing first in the National Youth League. Today, a total of twenty four clubs are known to have a considerable connection to the Italian community.

== Active clubs ==
As of the 2025 Football Season

Club	Founded	Location	League (Senior Men's)	Comments
Avondale FC	1984	Parkville, Melbourne	NPL	Permanent standalone club, founded as 'Keilor United'.
Bell Park Sports Club	1959	Bell Park, Geelong	VSL 4 West	Permanent standalone club, founded by members of the defunct Geelong Soccer Club (Italian) along with Croatians and British Australians.
Boroondara-Carey Eagles FC	2015	Bulleen, Melbourne	VPL 2	Founded by the merger of original standalone clubs Boroondara Lions, Doncaster Inter (Italian), Kew Eagles (Italian), and Old Carey.
Brimbank Stallions FC	1986	Sunshine, Melbourne	VSL 1 North-West	Permanent standalone club.
Brunswick Zebras FC	1964	Brunswick East, Melbourne	VSL 4 North	Founded by the merger of unnamed clubs, under the name 'Juventus', with de-merger history with latter clubs Bulleen Lions, Moreland Zebras and Whittlesea Ranges respectively.
Brunswick Juventus FC	1997	Fawkner, Melbourne	VPL 2	History of club is disputed, founded by the mergers and de-mergers of eight original standalone clubs. Foundation dates are disputed, the club claims to be founded as Brunswick Zebras FC in 1948, other clubs claim it was founded in 1997, but was established in its current form in 2007.
Carlton Azzurri SSC	1979	Carlton, Melbourne	MCSA - Saturday & Sunday Premier League	Permanent standalone club, and has never competed under Football Victoria.
Epping City SC	1981	Epping, Melbourne	VSL 2 North-West	Permanent standalone club.
Essendon Royals SC	1959	Essendon, Melbourne	VPL 2	Founded by the merger of original standalone clubs of East Brunswick, Fiorentina, Ivanhoe, Moonee Ponds and Triestina, under the name 'Essendon-Brunswick Royals', with de-merger history with latter club Bulleen Lions.
Fawkner SC	2010	Fawkner, Melbourne	VSL 3 North-West	Founded as & currently a standalone club, with de-merger history with latter and original clubs Manningham United, Moreland Zebras, North Reservoir, Regent and Whittlesea Ranges respectively.
Falcons 2000 SC	1961	Morwell	Latrobe Valley Soccer League	Permanent standalone club, founded from the Italian Australian Social Club of Gippsland (IASCOG). Italian-focused splinter team Inter Morwell was formed by club members to play in the LVSL in 1985; re-joined Falcons in 1993.
FC Bulleen Lions	1974	Bulleen, Melbourne	VPL 1	Founded as & currently a standalone club, with de-merger history with latter clubs Essendon Royals, Moreland Zebras and Whittlesea Ranges respectively.
Manningham Juventus FC	1964	Doncaster, Melbourne	VSL 4 East	Founded as 'Juventus Old Boys', being the social veterans squad of Brunswick Juventus, but amalgamated with Marcellin Old Collegians in 2022 to form a state league senior squad.
Knox United SC	2003	Rowville, Melbourne	VSL 5 South	Permanent standalone club.
Manningham United Blues FC	1999	Doncaster, Melbourne	VPL 1	Founded by the merging and de-merging of Fawkner, North Reservoir and Regent that became Fawkner-Whittlesea Blues, and finally becoming Manningham United and Fawkner SC.
Mildura City SC	1973	Mildura	Sunraysia Football League	Permanent standalone club, founded as 'Milan SC'.
Myrtleford Savoy SC	1959	Myrtleford	Albury Wodonga League	Permanent standalone club.
Northern Falcons FC	1986	Thornbury, Melbourne	VSL 4 North	Permanent standalone club, founded as 'Flemington Floridia'.
Old Xaverians SC	2002	Kew East, Melbourne	VSL 4 North	Permanent standalone club.
Shepparton South SC	1971	Shepparton	Bendigo Amateur Soccer League	Permanent standalone club.
Tatura SC	1961	Tatura	Bendigo Amateur Soccer League	Permanent standalone club.
Thornbury Athletic FC	2014	Reservoir, Melbourne	VSL 4 North	Permanent standalone club.
Three Colours SC	1980	Mildura	Sunraysia Football League	Permanent standalone club following a partial breakaway from Mildura City SC.
Werribee City FC	1969	Werribee, Melbourne	VPL 2	Permanent standalone club.
Whittlesea Ranges FC	1971	Epping, Melbourne	VSL 1 North-West	History of club is disputed, founded as the merger of the original club Thomastown TEL with a partial splitting of Moreland Zebras in 2009, with de-merger history with latter club Bulleen Lions.
Templestowe Wolves FC	2023	Templestowe, Melbourne	VSL 5 East	Founded as the merger of the original clubs Macedon Blues with Italian backed Victorian Churches Football Association Club The Blackburn Newhope FC Lupi.

== Former clubs ==
As of June 2022

Club	Founded	Location	Status
Abbotsford Tassa SC	1978	Fairfield, Melbourne	Founded as 'Abbotsford', renamed as 'Abbotsford Tassa' in 1981 and finally 'East Preston', disbanded in 1986.
Anstey Roma SC	1968	Brunswick, Melbourne	Amalgamated in 1970 with Essendon Royals SC.
Azzurri SC	1962	Brunswick West, Melbourne	Disbanded in 1963.
Batman United SC	1979	Coburg, Melbourne	Disbanded in 1992.
Boroondara Eagles SC	2008	Wantirna South, Melbourne	Merged in 2014 with Old Carey to become Boroondara-Carey Eagles FC.
Box Hill SC	1922	Box Hill South, Melbourne	No longer supported by the Italian community. Was acquired by the Italian community in 1992 and merged with Clayton Inter to become Box Hill Inter and Clayton FC (disbanded 2007), and later Melbourne Zebras and Bulleen Lions in 1997 to become Bulleen Inter Kings. De-merged in 2000 and was later sold in 2011 to the Greek community club Southern Suburbs SC.
Cartlon SC	1997	Carlton North, Melbourne	Disbanded in 2000.
Clayton FC	1966	Clayton South, Melbourne	Merged in 1992 with Box Hill to become Box Hill Inter, now known as Box Hill United.
Doncaster Inter SC	1986	Doncaster, Melbourne	Founded as 'Intercity', merged in 1994 with Kew Eagles to become Templestowe Eagles, finally becoming Boroondara-Carey Eagles FC.
East Brunswick SC	1970	Brunswick East, Melbourne	Merged in 1988 with Ivanhoe City to become East Brunswick-Ivanhoe, all finally becoming Bulleen Lions and Essendon Royals respectively.
East Brunswick Reggina SC	1988	Brunswick East, Melbourne	Founded as 'East Brunswick-Ivanhoe', merged in 1995 with Essendon City MP to become Essendon-Brunswick Royals, all finally becoming Bulleen Lions and Essendon Royals respectively.
East Cartlon SC	1969	Carlton North, Melbourne	Disbanded in 1983.
East Nunawading SC	1986	Nunawading, Melbourne	Founded as 'Nunawading United' from the merging of Nunawading United and Vermont SC, disbanded in 1996.
Essendon City Jets SC	1988	Essendon, Melbourne	Founded as 'Essendon City Triestina MP', merged in 1995 with East Brunswick Reggina to become Essendon-Brunswick Royals, all finally becoming Bulleen Lions and Essendon Royals respectively.
Fawkner-Whittlesea Blues FC	2004	Fawkner, Melbourne	De-merged in 2006, becoming Fawkner Blues (de-merged 2010) and Whittlesea Zebras (de-merged 2009), all finally becoming Fawkner, Manningham United, Moreland Zebras, and Whittelsea Ranges respectively.
Fiorentina SC	1958	Fairfield, Melbourne	Merged in 1963 with Triestina SC to become Essendon City Triestina SC, all finally becoming Bulleen Lions and Essendon Royals respectively.
Footscray Capri SC	1950	Footscray, Melbourne	Disbanded in 1961.
Geelong SC	1953	Geelong East, Geelong	Disbanded in 1963, members later founded Bell Park SC along with Croatians and British Australians.
Kew Eagles SC	1982	Kew East, Melbourne	Founded as 'Epping Eagles', later 'Eagles United', merged in 1994 with Doncaster Inter to become Templestowe Eagles, finally becoming Boroondara-Carey Eagles FC.
Ivanhoe City SC	1973	Ivanhoe, Melbourne	Founded as 'Central Brunswick', and later 'Dallas City', merged in 1988 with East Brunswick to become East Brunswick-Ivanhoe, all finally becoming Bulleen Lions and Essendon Royals respectively.
Juventus Old Boys SC	1965	Doncaster, Melbourne	Merged with Marcellin Old Collegians in 2022 to become present club Manningham Juventus.
Macleod United SC	1979	Macleod, Melbourne	Disbanded in 1983, possible amalgamation with Ivanhoe City.
Marcellin Old Collegians SC	2001	Bulleen, Melbourne	Merged with Juventus Old Boys in 2022 to become present club Manningham Juventus.
Moonee Ponds SC	1973	Moonee Ponds, Melbourne	Founded as 'Croxton' and later renamed as 'Moonnee Ponds' in 1979. Merged in 1983 with Essendon City Triestina to become Essendon City Triestina MP, all finally becoming Bulleen Lions and Essendon Royals respectively.
North Richmond SC	1959	Burnley, Melbourne	Disbanded in 1960.
North Reservoir SC	1993	Reservoir, Melbourne	Merged in 2000 with Thomastown-Regent Raiders to become Whittlesea Stallions, all finally becoming Fawkner, Manningham United, Moreland Zebras and Whittlesea Ranges respectively.
Nunawading United SC	1972	Nunawading, Melbourne	Merged with Vermont SC to become 'Forest Hill SC' in 1986, finally becoming 'East Nunawading SC'.
Pascoe Vale Falcons SC	2007	Pascoe Vale, Melbourne	Disbanded in 2007.
Savoia SC	1930	Parkville, Melbourne	Disbanded in 1939, remnants later becoming Brunswick Zebras FC and Moreland Zebras respectively.
Sicilia Kensington SC	1963	Flemington, Melbourne	Disbanded in 1963.
Templestowe Eagles SC	1994	Doncaster, Melbourne	Merged in 2008 with Kew Eagles to become Boroondara Eagles, finally becoming Boroondara-Carey Eagles FC.
Thomastown Devils FC	1971	Thomastown, Melbourne	Merged in 1997 to become Thomastown Zebras, all finally becoming Bulleen Lions, Moreland Zebras and Whittlesea Ranges respectively.
Thomastown-Regent Raiders SC	1969	Thomastown, Melbourne	Merged in 2000 with North Reservoir to become Whittlesea Stallions, in 2007 becoming Fawkner, Manningham United, Moreland Zebras and Whittlesea Ranges respectively.
Triestina SC	1961	Coburg, Melbourne	Merged in 1965 with Fiorentina to become Essendon City Triestina, all finally becoming Bulleen Lions and Essendon Royals respectively.
Vermont SC	1978	Blackburn South, Melbourne	Disbanded in 1985.
West Melbourne SC	1958	Parkville, Melbourne	Refounded in 1976 after a five year hiatus (1971–1975), but disbanded in 1984.
West Melbourne Sicilia SC	1958	Parkville, Melbourne	Merged in 1963 with Kensington to become Sicilia Kensington (disbanded 1963).
Westall SC	1981	Parkville, Melbourne	Disbanded in 1985.
Whittlesea Stallions FC	2000	Epping, Melbourne	Merged in 2004 with Fawkner to become Fawkner-Whittlesea Blues, in 2007 becoming Fawkner, Manningham United, Moreland Zebras, and Whittlesea Ranges respectively.
Williamstown Inter SC	1970	Williamstown, Melbourne	Disbanded in 1979.

== See also ==
- Italian Australians
- Italian community of Melbourne
- List of Italian soccer clubs in Australia
- List of sports clubs inspired by others
- List of Croatian soccer clubs in Australia
- List of Greek Soccer clubs in Australia
- List of Serbian soccer clubs in Australia
