= 2012 Campeonato Capixaba =

Campeonato Capixaba
- Season: 2012
- Champions: Aracruz (1st title)
- Relegated: Colatina; Serra
- Copa do Brasil: Aracruz
- Série D: Aracruz

The 2012 Campeonato Capixaba was the 96th season of Espírito Santo's top professional football league. The competition began on January 21 and ended on May 5. Aracruz won the championship for the first time, while Colatina and Serra were relegated.

== Format ==
The tournament consists of a double round-robin format, in which all ten teams play each other twice. The four better-placed teams will face themselves in playoffs matches. The bottom two teams on overall classification will be relegated. Only the champion will qualify for the 2013 Copa do Brasil.

== Participating teams ==
| Club | City | Home ground | 2011 result |
|---|---|---|---|
| Aracruz | Aracruz | Bambu | 5th |
| Colatina | Colatina | Justiniano de Melo e Silva | 6th |
| Conilon | Jaguaré | Estádio Conilon | 1st (2nd division) |
| Espírito Santo FC | Anchieta | Estádio Joaquim Viana Ramalheti | 7th |
| Linhares | Linhares | Estádio Joaquim Calmon | 3rd |
| Real Noroeste | Águia Branca | Estádio José Olímpio da Rocha | 2nd (2nd division) |
| Rio Branco | Vitória | Estádio Engenheiro Alencar Araripe | 1st |
| Serra | Serra | Estádio do Sernamby | 8th |
| São Mateus | São Mateus | Robertão | 4th |
| Vitória | Vitória | Salvador Costa | 2nd |

== First stage ==
=== Standings ===
| Pos | Team | Pld | W | D | L | GF | GA | GD | Pts | Qualification or relegation |
|---|---|---|---|---|---|---|---|---|---|---|
| 1 | Rio Branco (A) | 18 | 10 | 3 | 5 | 36 | 23 | +13 | 33 | Advances to the Semifinals |
| 2 | Aracruz (A) | 18 | 9 | 6 | 3 | 28 | 20 | +8 | 33 | Advances to the Semifinals |
| 3 | Vitória (A) | 18 | 9 | 4 | 5 | 23 | 15 | +8 | 31 | Advances to the Semifinals |
| 4 | Conilon (A) | 18 | 8 | 6 | 4 | 40 | 23 | +17 | 30 | Advances to the Semifinals |
| 5 | São Mateus | 18 | 8 | 2 | 8 | 17 | 23 | −6 | 26 | |
| 6 | Linhares | 18 | 9 | 3 | 6 | 27 | 19 | +8 | 24 (Note: Linhares was docked 6 points for using an irregular player.) | |
| 7 | Real Noroeste | 18 | 6 | 4 | 8 | 21 | 23 | −2 | 22 | |
| 8 | Espírito Santo FC | 18 | 5 | 3 | 10 | 15 | 26 | −11 | 18 | |
| 9 | Colatina (R) | 18 | 3 | 8 | 7 | 21 | 27 | −6 | 17 | Relegated |
| 10 | Serra (R) | 18 | 3 | 1 | 14 | 14 | 20 | −6 | 10 | Relegated |

Updated to match(es) played on 08 December 2012. Source:
Rules for classification: 1) points; 2) goal difference; 3) number of goals scored.
(A) Advance to a further round; (R) Relegated

=== Results ===
| Home \ Away | ARA | COL | CON | EPS | LIN | RNT | RBC | SMA | SER | VIT |
|---|---|---|---|---|---|---|---|---|---|---|
| Aracruz | | 2–2 | 0–0 | 4–0 | 1–0 | 2–1 | 2–1 | 1–0 | 1–0 | 0–1 |
| Colatina | 2–3 | | 1–1 | 0–0 | 1–1 | 1–1 | 2–2 | 2–0 | 2–3 | 1–0 |
| Conilon | 1–1 | 6–3 | | 5–0 | 1–1 | 2–1 | 2–3 | 3–0 | 4–0 | 1–1 |
| Espírito Santo FC | 2–0 | 0–0 | 0–3 | | 2–0 | 3–1 | 0–2 | 0–0 | 3–0 | 0–2 |
| Linhares | 2–3 | 1–0 | 2–1 | 1–0 | | 0–0 | 0–2 | 4–1 | 5–0 | 1–0 |
| Real Noroeste | 1–1 | 2–1 | 2–1 | 2–1 | 1–2 | | 1–2 | 2–0 | 3–1 | 1–1 |
| Rio Branco | 3–3 | 0–0 | 5–1 | 2–1 | 3–2 | 1–0 | | 1–2 | 1–2 | 1–0 |
| São Mateus | 0–1 | 2–0 | 0–2 | 1–0 | 2–1 | 0–1 | 1–0 | | 1–0 | 2–1 |
| Serra | 2–2 | 1–2 | 2–5 | 2–3 | 1–3 | 2–0 | 1–5 | 3–4 | | 0–3 |
| Vitória | 2–1 | 2–1 | 1–1 | 1–0 | 0–1 | 2–1 | 3–2 | 1–1 | 2–0 | |

Legend: Blue = home team win; Yellow = draw; Red = away team win.

== Final stage ==
Semifinals
1 | Rio Branco | 1 | 2 | 3
4 | Conilon | 2 | 4 | 6
2 | Aracruz | 1 | 1 | 2*
3 | Vitória | 1 | 1 | 2

Finals
4 | Conilon | 2 | 1 | 3
2 | Aracruz | 1 | 4 | 5

=== Semifinals ===
==== First leg ====
April 15, 2012
16:00 UTC−03:00

| Vitória | 1–1 | Aracruz |
|---|---|---|
| Mineiro 23' | Report | Euler 52' |

Salvador Costa, Vitória
Attendance: 1163

April 15, 2012
20:00 UTC−03:00

| Conilon | 2-1 | Rio Branco |
|---|---|---|
| Paulinho Pimentel 68'; Edu 80' | Report | Ronicley 57' |

Centro Esportivo Conilon, Jaguaré
Attendance: 1912

==== Second leg ====
April 20, 2012
19:30 UTC−03:00

| Aracruz | 1–1 | Vitória |
|---|---|---|
| David 30' | Report | Mineiro 67' |

Estádio Eugênio Antônio Bitti, Aracruz
Attendance: 3423

April 21, 2012
16:00 UTC−03:00

| Rio Branco | 2-4 | Conilon |
|---|---|---|
| Leandro 77'; Ronicley 90+1' | Report | Paulinho Pimentel 42', 86'; Ricardo Paraíba 84'; Marcos Alagoano 84' |

Estádio Rei Pelé, Maceió
Attendance: 1787

=== Finals ===
==== First leg ====
April 28, 2012

| Conilon | 2–1 | Aracruz |
|---|---|---|
| Edu; Léo | | Euler |

==== Second leg ====
May 5, 2012

| Aracruz | 4–1 | Conilon |
|---|---|---|
| Cal Santos; Nei; Gilmar; David | | Paulinho Pimentel |
