= 2013 Campeonato Capixaba =

Campeonato Capixaba de Futebol
- Season: 2013
- Champions: Ferroviária
- Relegated: Rio Branco; Espírito Santo
- Copa do Brasil: Ferroviária
- Série D: Aracruz

The 2013 Campeonato Capixaba de Futebol was the 97th season of Espírito Santo's top professional football league. The competition began on January 25 and ended on May 19. Ferroviária was the champion by the 17th time.

== Format ==
The tournament consists of a double round-robin format, in which all ten teams play each other twice. The four better-placed teams will face themselves in playoffs matches. The bottom two teams on overall classification will be relegated.

Only the champion will qualify for the 2014 Copa do Brasil. The best team on the first stage qualifies to the Série D.

== Participating teams ==
Club	Home city	2012 result
Aracruz	Aracruz	1st
Conilon	Jaguaré	2nd
Espírito Santo	Espírito Santo	8th
Estrela do Norte	Cachoeiro de Itapemirim	2nd (2nd division)
Ferroviária	Cariacica	1st (2nd division)
Linhares	Linhares	6th
Real Noroeste	Águia Branca	7th
Rio Branco-ES	Vitória	4th
São Mateus	São Mateus	5th
Vitória-ES	Vitória	3rd

== First stage ==
Pos	Team	Pld	W	D	L	GF	GA	GD	Pts	Qualification or relegation
1	Aracruz (A)	18	12	3	3	28	14	+14	39	Advances to the Semifinals
2	Ferroviária-ES (A)	18	10	5	3	36	21	+15	35	Advances to the Semifinals
3	Conilon (A)	18	10	2	6	33	17	+16	32	Advances to the Semifinals
4	Real Noroeste (A)	18	7	6	5	32	26	+6	27	Advances to the Semifinals
5	Linhares	18	8	1	9	24	25	−1	25	
6	Vitória-ES	18	6	5	7	25	26	−1	23	
7	São Mateus	18	5	8	5	26	26	0	23	
8	Estrela do Norte	18	5	7	6	24	26	−2	22	
9	Rio Branco-ES (R)	18	4	3	11	23	34	−11	15	Relegated
10	Espírito Santo (R)	18	0	6	12	13	49	−36	6	Relegated

Rules for classification: 1) points; 2) goal difference; 3) number of goals scored.
(A) Advance to a further round; (R) Relegated

=== Results ===
Home \ Away	ARA	CON	EPS	ESN	FER	LIN	RNT	RBC	SMA	VIT
Aracruz		1–0	1–0	0–0	2–1	3–0	3–2	4–1	1–0	1–1
Conilon	1–3		3–0	2–0	0–2	2–1	3–1	2–0	4–0	3–1
Espírito Santo	0–2	1–3		2–3	2–2	2–2	0–0	1–1	1–2	1–1
Estrela do Norte	2–0	1–1	2–1		1–1	1–2	2–2	2–3	4–2	1–4
Ferroviária-ES	2–1	2–1	5–1	2–1		3–1	1–1	2–1	2–2	1–0
Linhares	1–2	1–0	6–0	0–1	2–0		1–3	3–1	1–0	1–0
Real Noroeste	0–0	1–4	5–0	1–0	1–0	3–1		1–2	3–3	4–1
Rio Branco-ES	1–2	0–3	4–0	1–1	2–3	2–0	2–3		1–1	0–1
São Mateus	1–0	1–1	1–1	1–1	2–2	0–1	2–0	3–1		4–1
Vitória-ES	1–2	1–0	6–0	1–1	0–5	2–0	1–1	2–0	1–1	

Legend: Blue = home team win; Yellow = draw; Red = away team win.

== Final stage ==
Semifinals
1	Aracruz	0	4	4
4	Real Noroeste	2	2	4
2	Ferroviária-ES	1	3	4
3	Conilon	1	2	3

Finals
1	Aracruz	1	1	2
2	Ferroviária-ES	1	2	3
