= Savoia SC =

Savoia
- Full name: Savoia Soccer Club (presumed)
- Nickname: Savoy
- Founded: 1930 (presumed)
- Dissolved: 1939
- Ground: Royal Park, Parkville
Home colours	Away colours

The Savoia Soccer Club was an Australian association football (soccer) club based in Melbourne during the 1930s. The club is believed to have been the first in the state of Victoria to have been founded by Italian migrants. The club is also known to have been one of few sporting organisations to have been dissolved by the state authorities in Australia due to the fact that Fascist Italy was a member of the Axis powers during World War II, Australia's enemy at the time. The club is believed to have been based at Royal Park in Parkville, and former club members later assisted in the establishment of Victoria's most successful Italian sporting club 'Brunswick Juventus' in 1948. In late 1996 the club split and is now Brunswick Juventus Junior FC and Moreland Zebras Juventus FC respectively.

== History ==
The club was founded sometime in the early 1930s and was named after the Italian royal family, 'Casa Savoia'. The English language translation of the name was 'Savoy' which became the club's nickname. While the exact year of foundation remains uncertain, Juventus state the club's origins could be as early as the 1920s. While the club's movements prior to 1933 remain unknown, Savoy's movements in 1933 & 1934 were formally recorded as the club competed in the presently operating Football Victoria state soccer league system. In these two years, Savoy competed in the Victorian third-tier league, that is (as of 2020) the National Premier Leagues Victoria 3, finishing mid-table in both seasons. Savoy participated in the 1933 and 1934 Dockerty Cup tournaments, and on 27 May 1933 competing against regional club Yallourn Whites, it was the only reported occasion that non-Italian Australians competed for the club. In July 1934, Savoy played the first Greek established club 'Apollo Athletic' in a friendly match at Middle Park, one of five clubs to replace Savoy and Northcote in the state third tier, following their respective withdrawals in early 1935.

The Argus reported on 16 March 1935 that the club had indeed folded, but would later state on 24 April 1939 that Savoy had fielded a junior team. A photo taken in on 6 May 1939 shows Savoy players at a training session wearing the commonly reported light blue shirt, but wearing white shorts and black socks with a white stripe. Following the commencement of World War II, authorities sent Italian immigrants to internment camps without trial that ultimately led to the club's dissolving. Before being arrested, club secretary Rino Fontana hid the club's training equipment and playing kits.

== Legacy and connection to Brunswick Juventus ==
Following the war's conclusion more Italian immigrants landed in Australia, particularly in Melbourne where presently (as of April 2020) the largest Italian population in the Australian continent is based. Along with immigrants were Italian prisoners of war, one of which included army chaplain Father Agostino Galanti who had a passion for association football (soccer). Father Galanti had befriended former Savoy secretary Rino Fontana prior no later than 1948, and established a new club for the local Italian community. Fontana successfully hidden Savoy's training equipment and playing kits following internment and these assets were given to the new entity. After a community meeting, the name 'Juventus' was selected as it was (and still is as of 2020) the most successful team in Italy at the time and presented political neutrality, following the 1946 Italian institutional referendum that saw the establishment of the Italian Republic.

The club had multiple names throughout its history but it would be most commonly referred to as 'Brunswick Juventus'. Following national success and an abundance of state success, particularly in the 1950s and 1980s, the club ran into financial hardship in the mid-1990s. As a result, Brunswick Juventus split into three factions, known as the 'Brunswick', 'Juventus' and 'Zebras' factions respectively. The 'Brunswick' faction operates independently as Brunswick Juventus Junior FC, and is based in the original club rooms at Sumner Park in Brunswick East. The 'Juventus' and 'Zebras' factions re-merged in 2000, finally becoming the presently operating Moreland Zebras Juventus FC. The two factions were formerly aligned with the presently operating FC Bulleen Lions (Juventus) and Whittlesea Ranges FC (Zebras) respectively.

== See also ==
- Italian community of Melbourne
- List of Italian soccer clubs in Victoria, Australia
- List of sports clubs inspired by others
