= Marcinho =

Marcinho is the nickname of several Brazilian footballers.

- Marcinho (footballer, born 1973), Márcio Gomes Sampaio, Brazilian football forward
- Marcinho (footballer, born 1978), Márcio Franco da Silva, Brazilian football forward
- Marcinho (footballer, born 20 March 1981), Márcio Miranda Freitas Rocha da Silva, Brazilian football forward
- Marcinho (footballer, born 25 March 1981), Márcio Ivanildo da Silva, Brazilian football midfielder
- Marcinho (footballer, born July 1981), Márcio Luiz Adurens, Brazilian football attacking midfielder
- Marcinho (footballer, born 1984), Márcio José de Oliveira, Brazilian football midfielder
- Marcinho (footballer, born 1986), Marcio de Souza Gregório Júnior, Brazilian football midfielder
- Marcinho Pitbull (born 1987), Márcio José Lisboa Fortes Filho, Brazilian football midfielder
- Marcinho (footballer, born 1996), Márcio Almeida de Oliveira, Brazilian football defender
- Marcinho (footballer, born May 1995), Márcio Augusto da Silva Barbosa, Brazilian football forward
- Marcinho (footballer, born June 1995), Márcio Antônio de Sousa Júnior, Brazilian football winger
- Marcinho (footballer, born July 1995), Márcio Barbosa Vieira Junior, Brazilian football midfielder
- Marcinho (footballer, born 1998), Marcio Camillato Martinelli, Brazilian football midfielder
