= Brunswick SC =

Brunswick SC may refer to:

- Brunswick SC (1921–1936), a defunct Association football (soccer) club based in Brunswick, Victoria
- Brunswick City SC, an Association football (soccer) club based in Brunswick West, Victoria
- Brunswick Juventus FC, an Association football (soccer) club based in Fawkner, Victoria
- Brunswick Latvia FC, a defunct Association football (soccer) club based in Parkville, Victoria
- Brunswick Zebras FC, an Association football (soccer) club based in Brunswick East, Victoria
