= Hiran Spagnol =

Brazilian footballer (born 1971)

Personal information
- Full name: Hiran Spagnol
- Date of birth: October 29, 1971 (age 54)
- Place of birth: Linhares, Brazil
- Height: 1.99 m (6 ft 6 in)
- Position: Goalkeeper

Senior career*
Years	Team	Apps	(Gls)
1993	Linhares EC		
1994–1998	Guarani		
1998–1999	Atlético Mineiro		
1999–2000	Santo André		
2000	Remo		
2000–2001	Internacional		
2002–2004	Ponte Preta		
2010–2011	Linhares		
2012	São Mateus		
2012	Aracruz		
2013	Colatina		
2014–2015	Santacruzense		
2015–2017	Linhares FC		
- * Club domestic league appearances and goals

Hiran Spagnol, sometimes known as just Hiran (born October 29, 1971), is a retired Brazilian professional football goalkeeper, who played for several Campeonato Brasileiro Série A clubs.

== Career ==
Born on October 29, 1971, in Linhares, Espírito Santo, Hiran Spagnol started playing professionally in 1993, defending Linhares, winning that season's Campeonato Capixaba. In 1994, he joined Guarani, where he played 40 Campeonato Brasileiro Série A games, and scored with a header in 1996. In 1998, he was signed by Atlético Mineiro, leaving the club in 1999, then joining Santo André, where he scored with another header. He briefly played for Remo in 2000, moving in the same year to Internacional, where he played 35 Série A games. After leaving Internacional in 2001, in the following year, Hiran joined Ponte Preta, where he played 14 Série A games, then retired in 2004, after a car accident that broke his pelvis. After his retirement, he started a career as a goalkeeping coach.

== List of goals scored ==
Following, is the list with the goals scored by Hiran:

#	Date	Venue	Host team	Result	Away team	Competition	Score	Type	Opponent goalkeeper
1	27 February 1997	Estádio Brinco de Ouro, Campinas	Guarani	3–3	Palmeiras	Campeonato Paulista	3–3	Header	Velloso
2	6 June 1999	Estádio Bruno José Daniel, Santo André	Santo André	1–2	Juventus	Campeonato Paulista Série A2	1–2	Header	
3	14 May 2011	Estádio Salvador Costa, Vitória	Vitória	1–1	Linhares	Campeonato Capixaba	1–1	Penalty kick	

== Honours ==
Linhares EC

- Campeonato Capixaba: 1993

Aracruz

- Campeonato Capixaba: 2012

Colatina

- Campeonato Capixaba Série B: 2013
