= Hirani =

Hirani is an Indian surname belonging to a caste of people originating from Sindh region. Notable people with the surname include:

- Kishan Hirani (born 1992), Welsh snooker player
- Krupesh Hirani (born 1985), British politician
- Rajkumar Hirani (born 1962), Indian film director, producer, screenwriter, and editor

== See also ==
- Hiran (disambiguation)
