= Old Xaverians =

Old Xaverians may refer to:

- Old Xaverians Football Club, an Australian rules football club based in Armadale, Victoria
- Old Xaverians SC, an Association football (soccer) club based in Kew East, Victoria
