= Kainandro =

Brazilian footballer

Personal information
- Full name: Kainandro da Silva Pereira Santos
- Date of birth: 4 June 2000 (age 26)
- Place of birth: Jaguaré, Espírito Santo, Brazil
- Height: 1.84 m (6 ft 0 in)
- Position: Defender

Team information
- Current team: Nova Iguaçu FC

Youth career
- –2017: Grêmio
- 2018–2019: Vasco da Gama
- 2020–2021: Atlético Mineiro

Senior career*
Years	Team	Apps	(Gls)
2019–2020	Vasco da Gama	1	(0)
2019–2020	Al-Ittihad Kalba	9	(1)
2020	Al Urooba	-	(-)
2021–2022	Floresta	0	(0)
2022–	Lagos	8	(1)
- * Club domestic league appearances and goals as of 6 January 2020 (UTC)

Kainandro da Silva Pereira Santos (born 4 June 2000), commonly known as Kainandro, is a Brazilian footballer who plays for Nova Iguaçu FC.

== Career statistics ==
=== Club ===
As of 26 October 2019.

Club	Season	League			State league		Cup		Continental		Other		Total	
Club	Season	Division	Apps	Goals	Apps	Goals	Apps	Goals	Apps	Goals	Apps	Goals	Apps	Goals
Vasco da Gama	2019	Série A	0	0	1 (Note: Appearances in the Campeonato Carioca)	0	0	0	0	0	0	0	1	0
Ittihad Kalba (loan)	2019–20	UAE Pro League	6	1	–		3 (Note: Appearances in the UAE League Cup)	0	0	0	0	0	9	1
Career total			6	0	1	0	3	0	0	0	0	0	10	1
