= Ely Thadeu =

Brazilian footballer (born 1982)

Personal information
- Full name: Ely Thadeu Bravim Rangel
- Date of birth: 12 August 1982 (age 44)
- Place of birth: Vila Velha, Espírito Santo, Brazil
- Height: 1.70 m (5 ft 7 in)
- Position: Forward

Youth career
- 1995–2001: Vasco da Gama

Senior career*
Years	Team	Apps	(Gls)
2001–2003	Vasco da Gama	28	(4)
2004	→ Olaria (loan)		
2005–2006	→ Baraúnas (loan)		
2006–2007	Red Star Belgrade	10	(0)
2007	Democrata (SL)		
2008	Ipatinga	1	(0)
2009	Villa Nova		
2010–2011	Democrata (GV)	2	(0)
2011	Capixaba		
2012	Guarani (MG)	8	(1)
2012	Aracruz	3	(0)
2013	Democrata (GV)		
2014	Minas Boca		

International career
1998–1999	Brazil U17		
2000	Brazil U20	17	(0)
- * Club domestic league appearances and goals

Ely Thadeu Bravin Rangel (born 12 August 1982), commonly known as Ely Thadeu, is a Brazilian football forward.

== Club career ==
He was born in Vila Velha, Espírito Santo, Brazil. He started his career in 1995 when he was aged 12 and when he passed a trial at Vasco da Gama and joined their youth team. Since then, he will pass through all the youth teams of the club, before making his senior debut with Vasco first team in 2001, as the attacking partner of his idol, Romario. He became the first option after the injury of Euller and he grabbed the chance by scoring two goals in his first five matches in the Brasileirão. Because of his speed, during his early career he was nicknamed Filho do Vento (son of the wind) and by this time it was changed to Torpedo by his coach Joel Santana.

In 2004 Vasco loaned him to Olaria and in 2005 to Baraúnas. While with Vasco, he played a total of 67 matches and had scored 12 goals in the national and state championships. His senior debut was on 21 January 2001, in a Campeonato Carioca match against Madureira, and his first official goal for Vasco happened one week later when he scored the opening goal in the 2–1 victory over Frigurguense, also for the Carioca state championship.

In summer 2006 he left Vasco and decided to move abroad and join Red Star Belgrade. With them he won the 2006–07 Serbian SuperLiga and played in the 2006–07 UEFA Champions League and 2006–07 UEFA Cup qualifiers. In early 2008 he returned to Brazil and had a short spell with Democrata before moving back to the Brasileirão by joining Ipatinga in their first season ever in the Brazilian top-flight in April that year. However, after playing in the opening match of the season he ended dismissed by the club. During 2009 he played with Villa Nova Atlético Clube.

While playing with Democrata, in April 2010 he was accused of testing positive for cannabis in a doping test and was suspended, however in 2011 he was back to competition. In August 2011 he signed with lower league club Capixaba. In 2012, he joined Guarani playing in the Campeonato Mineiro but during that same year he moved to Esporte Clube Aracruz playing in the Campeonato Capixaba.

== International career ==
He has represented Brazil at U-17 and U-20 levels. He was part of the Brazil team at the 1998 Toulon Tournament, and he was called to be part of Brazil squad for the 1999 FIFA U-17 World Championship however because of an injury he did not travelled to New Zealand. In 2000, he was part of Brazil U-20 and that same year he won the tournament in China of the category.

== Honours ==
Vasco da Gama

- Campeonato Carioca: 2003

Baraúnas

- Campeonato Potiguar: 2006

Red Star Belgrade

- Serbian Superliga: 2006–07
- Serbian Cup: 2007

Guarani-MG

- Campeonato Capixaba: 2012

== Trivia ==
He is mostly known in Brazil as Ely Thadeu, although he is sometimes also referred to as Ely Tadeu.
