= List of sports clubs inspired by others =

This is a list of sports clubs that were created or altered out of inspiration from a visiting team or from a member of the club requesting a change of first name or strip because they were inspired by another club through their performances or conduct.

As of 8 June 2017 in alphabetical order.

| Team | Inspiration Team | Stadium | City | Country | Sport | Result of inspiration | Notes |
|---|---|---|---|---|---|---|---|
| ADAP/Galo Maringá FC | (Italy) Juventus FC | Estádio Willie Davids | Maringá | Brazil | | Crest design and first kit colour, which were used by the former sporting club, Galo Maringá Futebol Clube, prior its fusion with Associação Desportiva Atlética do Paraná (ADAP) in 2006 | |
| Adelaide City FC | (Italy) Juventus FC | Adelaide City Park | Adelaide | Australia | | Creation of club, first name until 1977, iconographic design and first kit colour since 1949 | |
| Alianza FC | (Peru) Alianza Lima | Estadio Cuscatlan | San Salvador | El Salvador | | First name | |
| Altona East Phoenix SC | (Greece) PAOK FC | Paisley Park Soccer Complex | Altona North, Melbourne | Australia | | Founded in 1979 by Greek immigrants as East Altona PAOK SC, taking nickname and black and white stripes from Greek team. Renamed Altona East 'Phoenix' in 1990s, in accordance to new laws prohibiting ethnic names in soccer clubs. | |
| Altona Magic SC | (North Macedonia) FK Vardar | Paisley Park Soccer Complex | Altona North, Melbourne | Australia | | Founded in 1967 by a group of Macedonian immigrants passionate about football initiated a meeting in Yarraville with the idea of forming a football team and by 1968 the team was registered as the Kingsville Soccer Club. In 1979, Renamed Altona Gate Soccer Club and taking the club colours of red and black signify the famous Macedonian Football Club, FK Vardar Skopje. | |
| América FC | America do Rio | Estádio Presidente Vargas | Fortaleza | Brazil | | Creation of club | |
| América de Manaus | America do Rio | Estádio Roberto Simonsen | Manaus | Brazil | | Creation of club | |
| América de Natal | America do Rio | Machadão | Natal | Brazil | | Creation of club | |
| América de Rio Preto | America do Rio | Teixeirão | São José do Rio Preto | Brazil | | Creation of club | |
| América do Sergipe | America do Rio | Estádio José Neto | Propriá | Brazil | | Creation of club | |
| América de Teófilo Otoni | America do Rio | Estádio Nassri Mattar | Teófilo Otoni | Brazil | | Creation of club | |
| América de Três Rios | America do Rio | Tievão | Três Rios | Brazil | | Creation of club | |
| Arsenal FC | (England) Nottingham Forest FC | Emirates Stadium | London | England | | First kit colour | |
| Arsenal Fútbol Club | (England) Arsenal FC, CA Independiente and Racing Club | Estadio Julio H. Grondona | Avellaneda | Argentina | | First name (Arsenal); First kit colours (Independiente and Racing) | |
| Arsenal Bila Tserkva | (England) Arsenal FC | Trudovi Reservy Stadium | Bila Tserkva | Ukraine | | First name and first kit colour | |
| Arsenal Kharkiv | (England) Arsenal FC | Arsenal-Spartak Stadium | Kharkiv | Ukraine | | First name and first kit colour | |
| Associação Botafogo FC | Botafogo FR | Almeidão | João Pessoa | Brazil | | Creation of club | |
| Atlético Torino | (Italy) Torino FC | Estadio Campeonísimo | Talara, Piura | Peru | | First name and first kit colour | |
| Ayaks Shakhtarsk | (Netherlands) AFC Ajax | Shakhtar Stadium | Shakhtarsk | Ukraine | | New name and crest | |
| Ballynahinch Rabbitohs | (Australia) South Sydney Rabbitohs | Ballymacaren Park | Ballynahinch, County Down | Northern Ireland | Rugby league | iconographic design and first kit colour | |
| FC Barcelona | (Switzerland) FC Basel | Camp Nou | Barcelona | Spain | | First kit colour | |
| Barcelona SC | (Spain) FC Barcelona | Estadio Monumental Banco Pichincha | Guayaquil | Ecuador | | Crest design | |
| Barsa Sumy | (Spain) FC Barcelona | Barsa Football Center | Sumy | Ukraine | | Creation of club and first name | |
| Bechem Chelsea | (England) Chelsea FC | Coronation Park | Sunyani | Ghana | | Creation of club | |
| Belfast Celtic FC | (Scotland) Celtic FC | Celtic Park | Belfast | Northern Ireland | | Creation of club | |
| Berekum Arsenal | (England) Arsenal FC | Berekum Sports Stadium | Berekum | Ghana | | Creation of club | |
| Blackpool Sea Eagles | (Australia) Manly Warringah Sea Eagles | Vodacom Park | Blackpool | England | Rugby league | iconographic design and first kit colour | |
| Bloemfontein Celtic FC | (Scotland) Celtic FC | Vodacom Park | Bloemfontein | South Africa | | Change of first name in 1984 | |
| Boca Juniors de Cali | (Argentina) Boca Juniors | Estadio Olímpico Pascual Guerrero | Cali | Colombia | | Creation of club and first kit colour | |
| Botafogo FC | (Brazil) Botafogo FR | Estádio 5 de Julho | Ilha do Fogo | Cape Verde | | Creation of club and first kit colour | |
| Botafogo FC | Botafogo FR | Almeidão | João Pessoa | Brazil | | Creation of club and first kit colour | |
| Botafogo FR | (Italy) Juventus FC | Estádio Olímpico João Havelange | Rio de Janeiro | Brazil | | Change of first kit colour in 1906 | |
| A.F.C. Bournemouth | (Italy) AC Milan | Dean Court | Bournemouth | England | | Change of first kit colour in 1971 | |
| SC Braga | (England) Arsenal FC | Estádio AXA | Braga | Portugal | | Change of first kit colour (1945–1947) | |
| Brisbane City FC | Italy | Spencer Park | Newmarket, Brisbane | Australia | | Crest design | |
| Brunswick Zebras FC | (Italy) Juventus FC | Sumner Park | Brunswick, Melbourne | Australia | | Creation of club, first name until 1993 and first kit colour | |
| Club Real Potosí | (Spain) Real Madrid CF | Estadio Víctor Agustín Ugarte | Potosí | Bolivia | | Change of crest design and first name in 1997 | |
| Colo-Colo FR | (Chile) CSD Colo-Colo | Estádio Mário Pessoa | Ilhéus | Brazil | | Creation of club | |
| Conilon Futebol Clube de Jaguaré | Botafogo FR | Estádio do Conilon | Jaguaré | Brazil | | Creation of club | |
| FC Chambly | (Italy) FC Internazionale | Stade des Marais | Chambly | France | | Crest and first kit colour | |
| SC Corinthians Alagoano | SC Corinthians Paulista | Nelsão | Maceió | Brazil | | Creation of club | |
| SC Corinthians Paulista | (England) Corinthian FC | Neo Química Arena | São Paulo | Brazil | | Name of club | |
| Croydon City Arrows FC | (Italy) AC Milan | Dorset Recreational Reserve | Melbourne | Australia | | Creation of club | |
| Crystal Palace FC | (Spain) FC Barcelona and (Spain) Levante UD | Selhurst Park | Selhurst, London | England | | Change of first kit colour in 1974 | |
| Dallas Harlequins RFC | (England) Harlequin FC | Glencoe Park | Dallas, Texas | United States | | Creation of club | |
| Dallas Tornado | (Scotland) Dundee United FC | Cotton Bowl | Dallas, Texas | United States | | Creation of club | |
| Dandenong City SC | HNK Hajduk Split | Frank Holohan Soccer Complex | Endeavour Hills, Melbourne | Australia | | Founded in 1981 as Parkmore Hajduk by Croatian immigrants, after Croatian team Hajduk Split. Renamed Chelsea Hajduk, but merged with Dandenong City in 2008, keeping the latter's name. | |
| Deportivo Italia | Italy | Estadio Olímpico de la UCV | Caracas | Venezuela | | First kit colour as the Italian community's football team in the country | |
| Deportivo Táchira FC | Juventus FC and Italy | Estadio Polideportivo de Pueblo Nuevo | San Cristobal | Venezuela | | Rebirth of San Cristobal's Juventus, founded by initiative of Deportivo Tachira's establisher and first president Gaetano Greco in 1970 and initially composed by former Juventus footballers. Named "Juventus" after the Italian club prior its debut in Venezuelan football's top flight in 1974. Its first season was held with mostly former Juventus players wearing a debut kit based on the Italy national team colours | |
| Detroit Cougars | (Northern Ireland) Glentoran FC | Tiger Stadium | Detroit | United States | | Creation of club | |
| Donegal Celtic FC | (Scotland) Celtic FC | Donegal Celtic Park | Belfast | Northern Ireland | | Creation of club | |
| Essendon Royals SC | (Italy) US Triestina | Clifton Park | Essendon, Melbourne | Australia | | Creation of club and first name until 1983 | |
| Everton de Viña del Mar | (England) Everton FC | Estadio Sausalito | Viña del Mar | Chile | | Creation of club | |
| Foggia Calcio | (Italy) AC Milan | Stadio Pino Zaccheria | Foggia | Italy | | First kit colour | |
| Forest Green Rovers FC | (Spain) FC Barcelona | The New Lawn | Nailsworth | England | | Change of crest design (2009–2011) | |
| Gungahlin United FC | (Italy) Juventus FC | Gungahlin Enclosed Oval | Gungahlin | Australia | | First name and first kit colour until 2005 | |
| Hobart Harlequins | (England) Harlequin FC | Rugby Park | Cornelian Bay | Australia | | Change of kit colour | |
| Hobart Zebras FC | (Italy) Juventus FC | KGV Park | Tasmania | Australia | | Creation of club, first name until 1997 and first kit colour. Since 1997 the club change the name by Australian Football League (AFC) decision, being knowns since then as "Zebras" after the Italian club's iconographic symbol | |
| Hong Kong Rangers FC | (Scotland) Rangers FC | Kowloon Bay Park | Kowloon | Hong Kong | | Creation of club | |
| CA Independiente | (England) Nottingham Forest FC | Estadio Libertadores de América | Avellaneda, Buenos Aires | Argentina | | Change of first kit colour (presumably) | |
| C.S.D. Independiente del Valle | (Italy) FC Internazionale | Estadio Rumiñahui | Sangolquí | Ecuador | | Crest and first kit colour | |
| Inter Club d'Escaldes | (Italy) FC Internazionale | Centre d'Entrenament de la FAF | Escaldes-Engordany | Andorra | | First name and first kit colour | |
| FC Inter Turku | (Italy) FC Internazionale | Veritas Stadion | Turku | Finland | | First name and first kit colour | |
| G.D. Interclube | (Italy) FC Internazionale | Estádio 22 de Junho | Luanda | Angola | | First name and first kit colour | |
| J. Malucelli Futebol | SC Corinthians Paulista | Eco-Estádio Janguito Malucell | Curitiba | Brazil | | Change of crest design, first name and first kit colour (2009–2012) | |
| AC Juventus | (Italy) Juventus FC | Estádio José de Melo | Rio Branco, Acre | Brazil | | Creation of club and first name | |
| AS Juventus de Saint-Martin | (Italy) Juventus FC | Stade Alberic Richards | Sandy Ground, Saint Martin | Saint Martin | | Creation of club, first name and first kit colour | |
| ASG Juventus de Sainte-Anne | (Italy) Juventus FC | Stade Rivière des Pères | Sainte-Anne | Guadeloupe | | Creation of club | |
| CA Juventus | (Italy) Juventus FC and (Italy) Torino FC | Estádio Rua Javari | São Paulo | Brazil | | Original name used again since 1930 (Juventus); Change of first kit colour in 1930 (Torino) | |
| CS Juventus București | (Italy) Juventus FC | Stadionul Juventus | Bucharest | Romania | | Crest design | |
| CSD Juventus | (Italy) Juventus FC | Folke Anderson | Esmeraldas | Ecuador | | Creation of club and first kit colour | |
| Sociedade Educação Física Juventus | (Italy) Juventus FC | Estádio Capitão Manoel Aranha | Curitiba | Brazil | | Change of first name and first kit in 1935 | |
| SS Juventus Roma | (Italy) Juventus FC | Campo della Farnesina | Rome | Italy | | Creation of club, first name and first kit colour | |
| Sport Vereniging Juventus | (Italy) Juventus FC | Municipal Stadium | Antriòl, Kralendijk on Bonaire | Netherlands Antilles | | Creation of club, first name and first kit colour | |
| Juventus-Firenze FBC | (Italy) Juventus FC | Campo della Farnesina | Florence | Italy | | Creation of club and first name | |
| Juventus FC | (England) Notts County FC | Juventus Stadium | Turin | Italy | | Change of first kit colour in 1903 according with former president Enrico Canfari's memoir (1915) | |
| Juventus Futebol Clube | (Italy) Juventus FC | Estádio João Francisco dos Santos | Rio de Janeiro | Brazil | | Creation of club, first name and first kit colour | |
| Juventus Idrottsförening | (Italy) Juventus FC | Råby IP | Västerås | Sweden | | Creation of club, first name and first kit colour. Initially was a Torinese team's fan club founded in 1948 by Italians to have immigrated to Sweden | |
| Juventus Orange Walk | (Italy) Juventus FC | Orange Walk People's Stadium | Orange Walk | Belize | | Creation of club, first name and first kit colour | |
| Launceston City FC | (Italy) Juventus FC | Mitsubishi Park | Tasmania | Australia | | Change of first name (1958–1997) and first kit colour in 1958 | |
| Leeds United AFC | (Spain) Real Madrid CF | Elland Road | Leeds | England | | Change of first kit colour in 1960 | |
| Lincoln Red Imps F.C. | (England) Lincoln City F.C. | Victoria Stadium | Gibraltar | Gibraltar | | Creation of club, first name and colours | |
| Liverpool Fútbol Club | (England) Liverpool FC | Estadio Belvedere | Montevideo | Uruguay | | Creation of club | |
| Lurgan Celtic FC | (Scotland) Celtic FC | Knockrammer Park | Lurgan | Northern Ireland | | Creation of club | |
| FC Martigues | (Italy) FC Internazionale | Stade Francis Turcan | Martigues | France | | Change of crest design in 2017 | |
| Manchester 62 F.C. | (England) Manchester United F.C. | Victoria Stadium | Gibraltar | Gibraltar | | Creation of club, first name and colours | |
| SSD Massese | (Italy) Juventus FC | Stadio degli Oliveti | Massa | Italy | | Change of crest design and first kit colour in 1944 | |
| Moreland Zebras FC | (Italy) Juventus FC | CB Smith Reserve | Moreland, Victoria | Australia | | Creation of club, crest design, first name until 1996, iconographic design and first kit colour | |
| Mighty Blackpool FC | (England) Blackpool FC | National Stadium | Freetown | Sierra Leone | | Change of name in 1954 | |
| Moneni Pirates FC | (South Africa) Orlando Pirates FC | Mavuso Stadium | Manzini | Eswatini | | Change of name on 16 September 1967 | |
| Ocean City Nor'easters | (England) Reading FC | Carey Stadium | Ocean City | United States | | Change of first name, crest design and first kit colour (2008–2010) | |
| Olympiakos Nicosia | (Greece) Olympiakos FC | GSP Stadium | Nicosia | Cyprus | | Creation of club | |
| Orlando Pirates SC | (South Africa) Orlando Pirates FC | Sam Nujoma Stadium | Windhoek | Namibia | | Use of name since its inception | |
| SE Palmeirinha | SE Palmeiras | Estádio Vila Formosa | Porto Ferreira | Brazil | | Creation of club | |
| FK Partizan | (Italy) Juventus FC | Partizan Stadium | Belgrade | Serbia | | Change of first kit colour in 1957 | |
| CA Peñarol de Mar del Plata | (Uruguay) CA Peñarol | Polideportivo Islas Malvinas | Mar del Plata | Argentina | | First name | |
| Petare FC | Deportivo Italia | Estadio Olímpico de la UCV | Caracas | Venezuela | | First kit colour until 2015 | |
| A.C. Pisa 1909 | (Italy) FC Internazionale | Arena Garibaldi | Pisa | Italy | | First kit colour since 1910 | |
| SE River Plate | (Argentina) CA River Plate | Estádio Idalito Oliveira | Carmópolis | Brazil | | Crest and first kit colour | |
| Real Madrid CF | (England) Corinthian FC | Estadio Santiago Bernabéu | Madrid | Spain | | First kit colour | |
| Real Odesa | (Spain) Real Madrid CF | SKA Stadium | Odesa | Ukraine | | Creation of club, first name, crest design and first kit colour: an Odesa fan club of Real Madrid turned into a professional football club | |
| Real Salt Lake | (Spain) Real Madrid CF | America First Field | Sandy, Utah | United States | | First name. The club has a partnership with the Spanish team for the development of the youth academy | |
| A.C. Renate | (Italy) FC Internazionale | Stadio Città di Meda | Renate | Italy | | Crest and first kit colour | |
| Salford City Roosters | (Australia) Sydney Roosters | Moat Hall Sports Centre | City of Salford | England | | Crest design, first name and first kit colour | |
| SV River Plate Aruba | (Argentina) CA River Plate | Guiilermo P. Trinidad Stadium | Oranjestad, Aruba | Aruba | | Crest design, first name and first kit colour | |
| FC Santos Tartu | (Brazil) Santos FC | Tamme Stadium | Tartu | Estonia | | Creation of club | |
| Santos Football Club | (Brazil) Santos FC | Providence Stadium | Georgetown | Guyana | | Crest design and first kit colour | |
| Santos Futebol Clube | Santos FC | Estádio Municipal Glicério Marques | Macapá, Amapá | Brazil | | Crest design and first kit colour | |
| Santos Futebol Clube de Angola | (Brazil) Santos FC | Estádio dos Coqueiros | Viana, Luanda | Angola | | Crest design and first kit colour | |
| Santos de Guápiles FC | (Brazil) Santos FC | Estadio Ebal Rodríguez | Guápiles | Costa Rica | | First name | |
| AC Sparta Prague | (England) Woolwich Arsenal FC | Generali Arena | Prague | Czech Republic | | Change of first kit colour in 1906 | |
| South Humber Rabbitohs | (Australia) South Sydney Rabbitohs | Grimsby RUFC | Lincolnshire | England | | iconographic design and first kit colour | |
| St. Albans Saints | (Croatia) Dinamo Zagreb | Churchill Reserve | St. Albans | Australia | | Original name in 1954 and current kit and crest design | |
| St. Catharines Wolves | (Italy) AS Roma | Club Roma Stadium | St. Catharines | Canada | | Creation of club, crest design and first kit colour | |
| União Flamengo Santos FC | (Brazil) CR Flamengo, (Brazil) Santos FC and Argentina | UB Stadium | Gaborone | Botswana | | Creation of club and first name (Flamengo and Santos); First kit colour (Argentina national team) | |
| Tauro FC | (Italy) Juventus FC | Estadio Rommel Fernández | Panama City | Panama | | Creation of club and first kit colour | |
| Unión Española SADP | Spain | Estadio Santa Laura-Universidad SEK | Independencia, Santiago de Chile | Chile | | First kit colour as the Spanish community's football team in the country | |
| AD Vasco da Gama | Club de Regatas Vasco da Gama | Estádio José de Melo | Rio Branco | Brazil | | Creation of club | |
| Perth Bears | (Australia) North Sydney Bears | Perth Rectangular Stadium | Perth | Australia | Rugby league | Creation of club | |
| Wycombe Wanderers FC | Wanderers FC | Adams Park | High Wycombe | England | | Creation of club | |

== See also ==
=== Generic ===
- Phoenix club (sports)
- Relocation of professional sports teams

=== Specific ===
- List of Croatian soccer clubs in Australia
- List of Greek Soccer clubs in Australia
- List of Italian Soccer clubs in Australia
- List of Serbian soccer clubs in Australia
