= Marcinho (footballer, born 1998) =

Brazilian footballer

Personal information
- Full name: Marcio Camillato Martinelli
- Date of birth: 8 June 1998 (age 28)
- Height: 1.74 m (5 ft 9 in)
- Position: Forward

Team information
- Current team: Desportiva Ferroviária

Youth career
- –2018: Espírito Santo
- 2018: Grêmio

Senior career*
| Years | Team | Apps | (Gls) |
| 2017–2018 | Espírito Santo | 6 | (0) |
| 2019 | Vitória-ES | 1 | (0) |
| 2019 | Desportiva Ferroviária | 0 | (0) |
| 2020 | Retrô | 3 | (1) |
| 2020 | → Vera Cruz-PE (loan) | 0 | (0) |
| 2020– | Desportiva Ferroviária | 0 | (0) |
- * Club domestic league appearances and goals as of 16:14, 6 August 2020 (UTC)

Marcio Camillato Martinelli (born 8 June 1998), commonly known as Marcinho, is a Brazilian footballer who currently plays as a forward for Desportiva Ferroviária.

== Career statistics ==
=== Club ===
As of 6 August 2020.

| Club | Season | League | | | State League | | Cup | | Other | | Total | |
| Club | Season | Division | Apps | Goals | Apps | Goals | Apps | Goals | Apps | Goals | Apps | Goals |
|---|---|---|---|---|---|---|---|---|---|---|---|---|
| Espírito Santo | 2017 | – | | | 6 (Note: Appearances in the Campeonato Capixaba) | 0 | 0 | 0 | 0 | 0 | 6 | 0 |
| Vitória-ES | 2019 | Série D | 1 | 0 | 0 | 0 | 0 | 0 | 0 | 0 | 1 | 0 |
| Desportiva Ferroviária | 2019 | – | | | 0 | 0 | 0 | 0 | 7 (Note: Appearances in the Copa Espírito Santo) | 0 | 7 | 0 |
| Retrô | 2020 | – | | | 3 (Note: Appearances in the Campeonato Pernambucano) | 1 | 0 | 0 | 0 | 0 | 3 | 1 |
| Vera Cruz-PE (loan) | 2020 | – | | | 0 | 0 | 0 | 0 | 0 | 0 | 0 | 0 |
| Desportiva Ferroviária | 2020 | – | | | 0 | 0 | 0 | 0 | 0 | 0 | 0 | 0 |
| Career total | | | 1 | 0 | 9 | 1 | 0 | 0 | 7 | 0 | 17 | 1 |
