= Campeonato Capixaba de Futebol Feminino =

Women's football league in Espírito Santo, Brazil

Campeonato Capixaba Feminino
- Founded: 2010
- Country: Brazil
- Confederation: FES
- Promotion to: Brasileiro Série A3
- Current champions: Prosperidade (3rd title) (2026)
- Most championships: Vila Nova (9 titles)
- Current: 2026

The Campeonato Capixaba Feminino is the women's football state championship of Espírito Santo state, and is contested since 2010.

== List of champions ==
Following is the list with all recognized titles of Campeonato Capixaba Feminino.

Ed.	Season	Champions	Runners-up	Ref.
1	2010	Vila Nova (1)	Comercial	
2	2011	Colatina SE (1)	Vila Nova	
3	2012	Comercial (1)	UNESC	
4	2013	Comercial (2)	Projeto SELC	
5	2014	Comercial (3)	Vila Nova	
6	2015	Vila Nova (2)	Projeto SELC	
7	2016	Vila Nova (3)	Comercial	
8	2017	Vila Nova (4)	Prosperidade	
9	2018	Vila Nova (5)	AE Capixaba	
10	2019	Vila Nova (6)	Prosperidade	
11	2020	Not held due to COVID-19 pandemic in Brazil		
12	2021	Vila Nova (7)	Prosperidade	
13	2022	Vila Nova (8)	Prosperidade	
14	2023	Vila Nova (9)	Prosperidade	
15	2024	Prosperidade (1)	Vila Nova	
16	2025	Prosperidade (2)	Estadual	
17	2026	Prosperidade (3)	Estadual	

== Titles by club ==
Teams in bold stills active.

Club	Titles	Winning years
**Vila Nova**	9	2010, 2015, 2016, 2017, 2018, 2019, 2021, 2022, 2023
Comercial	3	2012, 2013, 2014
**Prosperidade**	3	2024, 2025, 2026
Colatina SE	1	2011

=== By city ===
City	Championships	Clubs
Vila Velha	9	Vila Nova (9)
Castelo	3	Comercial (3)
Vargem Alta	3	Prosperidade (3)
Colatina	1	Colatina SE (1)
