= List of Greek soccer clubs in Australia =

The Greek community in Australia has contributed greatly to Australian soccer with many clubs being founded by local Greek communities.

== Clubs by state/territory ==
=== Australian Capital Territory ===
Club	Founded	Location	League
Canberra Olympic FC	1955	O'Connor	NPL

=== New South Wales ===
Club	Founded	Location	League
Canterbury Bankstown FC	1958	Bankstown	NSW League One
Gladesville Ryde Magic FC	1977	North Ryde	NSW League Two
Newcastle Olympic FC	1976	Hamilton	NPL
Hurstville City Minotaurs FC	1985	Hurstville	St George Premier League
Inner West Hawks FC	1978	Stanmore	NSW League Two
Sydney Olympic FC	1957	Belmore	NSW League One
Wollongong Olympic FC	1963	North Wollongong	Illawarra Premier League

=== Northern Territory ===
Club	Founded	Location	League
Hellenic Athletic	1958	Darwin	NorZone Premier League
Darwin Olympic SC	1967	Darwin	NorZone Premier League

=== Queensland ===
Club	Founded	Location	League
Olympic FC	1967	Brisbane	NPL
Surfers Paradise Apollo SC	1978	Gold Coast	Queensland Premier League

=== South Australia ===
Club	Founded	Location	League
Adelaide Comets FC	1994	Adelaide	NPL
Adelaide Olympic FC	1978	Adelaide	NPL
West Adelaide Hellas	1962	Adelaide	NPL
Adelaide Cobras	1972	Adelaide	SL1

=== Tasmania ===
Club	Founded	Location	League
Olympia FC	1960	Hobart	NPL

=== Victoria ===
Club	Founded	Location	League
Altona East Phoenix SC	1979	Altona North	SL1
Bayside Argonauts FC	1984	Cheltenham	VPL2
Bentleigh Greens SC	1987	Cheltenham	VPL1
Brunswick City SC	1970	Brunswick West	VPL1
FC Clifton Hill	1975	Clifton Hill	SL1
Darebin United Apollo SC	1975	Thornbury	SL4
East Kew FC	1985	Kew East	SL5
Heidelberg United FC	1958	Heidelberg Weste	NPL
Kingston City FC	1974	Clayton South	VPL1
Malvern City FC	1976	Kooyong	VPL1
Northcote City FC	1960	Thornbury	VPL1
Oakleigh Cannons FC	1972	Oakleigh	NPL
Port Melbourne SC	1968	Port Melbourne	VPL2
South Melbourne FC	1959	Albert Park	NPL
South Springvale SC	1968	Springvale South	VPL2
Traralgon Olympians SC	1980	Traralgon	LVSL
West Preston SC	1984	Preston	SL4
Western Suburbs SC	1965	Sunshine	SL1
Westvale SC	1983	St Albans	SL2
Yarraville Glory FC	1966	Yarraville	SL1

=== Western Australia ===
Club	Founded	Location	League
Floreat Athena FC	1951	Perth	NPL
Olympic Kingsway SC	1953	Perth	NPL
Alexander Florina FC	2012	Perth	

== See also ==
- List of sports clubs inspired by others
- List of Croatian soccer clubs in Australia
- List of Italian Soccer clubs in Australia
- List of Serbian soccer clubs in Australia
