= Brunswick SC (1921–1936) =

Brunswick
- Full name: Brunswick Soccer Club
- Founded: 1921; 105 years ago
- Dissolved: 1936; 90 years ago

The second known Brunswick Soccer Club was an Australian association football (soccer) club based in the inner-northern suburbs of Melbourne, presumably Brunswick. The club was founded in early 1921 and competed in the first and second-tier leagues of the Victorian state soccer system throughout its existence, until dissolving at the conclusion of the 1936 season. The club is known for winning the 1931 state championship, then known as the 'Metropolitan League Division One'.

Off the field, little is known about the club itself, with the club's home venue and playing colors remaining a mystery. This club appears to have had no link to the Brunswick Soccer Club that competed only in the 1915 tier two season, and no connection to the other Brunswick named soccer clubs that would follow. The 1930s saw multiple football clubs dissolve in the state of Victoria with Brunswick folding in 1936. Fellow tier one champions St Kilda, Windsor and Melbourne Thistle all folded in the mid-1930s, at a time of economic stress resulting from the Great Depression in Australia.

Brunswick's first competitive game was played on 7 May 1921 and resulted in a 2–0 win against the St Kilda reserves team which played in the Second Division for that season. Brunswick went on to win the Victorian Second Division at its first attempt in 1921 and attain promotion to First Division.

On 27 June 1936 Brunswick played its last game defeating Box Hill 2–1 in the final round of the Victorian Second-tier league, then known as 'Metropolitan League Division Two'.

== Honours ==
- Victorian Division One (state first tier)

Premiers (1): 1931

- Victorian Division Two (state second tier)

Premiers (1): 1921
Runners-up (1): 1929

- Dockerty Cup

Runners-up (1): 1931
