= Hiran =

Hiran may refer to:

== Places ==
- Hiran, Iran, a village in Isfahan Province
- Hiran, Somalia, an administrative region in central Somalia
- Ngoenyang, or Hiran, a 7th- to 13th-century kingdom of the Northern Thai people

== People ==
- Hiran Chatterjee, Indian actor
- Hiran Deraniyagala, guitarist for heavy metal band Battlecross
- Hiran Spagnol, former Brazilian football goalkeeper

== Technology ==
- HIRAN, a high-precision navigation system based on SHORAN and used in the post WW2 geodetic retriangulation of Great Britain
