= Hays Paddock =

Park in Melbourne, Victoria, Australia

- Glass Creek Park; Kilby Park
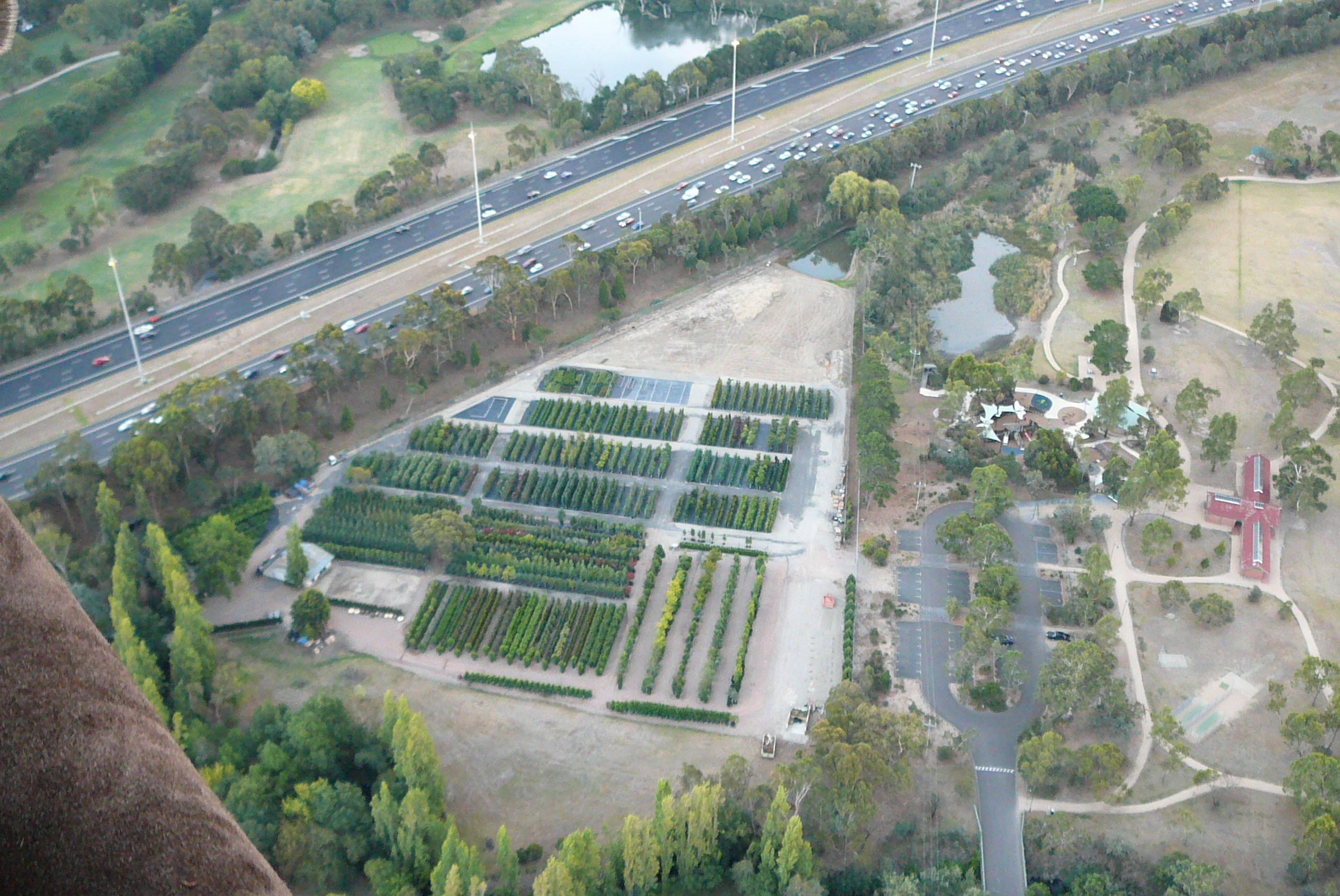
- Kew Golf Course and Eastern Freeway (top), commercial nursery (centre), and Hays Paddock (right), viewed from a hot-air balloon in 2007

- Location within Melbourne
- Interactive map of Hays Paddock
- Type: Urban park
- Location: Kew East, Melbourne, Victoria, Australia
- Coordinates: 37°47′21″S 145°3′31″E
- Area: 13.8 ha (34 acres)
- Established: 1987; 39 years ago
- Founder: William Oswin
- Operator: City of Boroondara
- Open: All year
- Status: Open
- Paths: Walking and cycling
- Habitats: Woodlands
- Water: Glass Creek
- Vegetation: Native trees
- Public transit: –; – 200, 207; – Main Yarra Trail, Koonung Trail
- Facilities: Barbecue; basketball half-court; exercise equipment; pavilion; picnic shelter; playground; seating; sporting ovals; toilets; walking and cycling tracks
- Website: boroondara.vic.gov.au

The Hays Paddock is a 13.8-hectare (34-acre) urban park and recreational area in Kew East, an eastern suburb of Melbourne, in Victoria, Australia. Established in 1844, the park is operated by the City of Boroondara, on the traditional lands of the Wurundjeri people.

The park is also sometimes referred to as 'Kilby Park' due to its proximity to Kilby Road, and 'Glass Creek' due to the eponymous creek that runs through the park, that enters from the south-east corner and exits underneath the Eastern Freeway.

== Description ==
Old Xaverians SC (left) and Plenty Valley Lions FC (right) observing a minute silence before a football game, 2019

The park facilities include an all-abilities playground, walking and cycling tracks, a pavilion, an archery range, and two ovals that provide for cricket, and football. Teams that use the playing fields include the Old Xaverians SC, Kew Deaf Soccer Club, Deepdene Cricket Club, and Melbourne Deaf Cricket Club.

William Oswin was the first recorded owner of the land in 1844 where Hays Paddock and Glass Creek flows into the Yarra River on a property known as Kilby Farm. Almost all the floodplain of the Yarra was originally cleared for grazing and dairying use – leaving isolated remnant river red gums. Various parts of Oswin's land was carved out for the Kew Golf Course and, during the 1960s, for the Eastern Freeway and parts of the site were used as a depot.

At the conclusion of the freeway's construction, planting of native trees was initiated by community groups in the 1970s to create a woodlands character. The land was transferred to the former City of Kew in 1979, commenced planning for use of the site as a public park, that was opened in 1987 with sporting fields and the all-abilities playground was completed in 1998 and updated during 2024.

== See also ==
- Parks and gardens of Melbourne
