= Fawkner-Whittlesea Blues =

Fawkner-Whittlesea
- Full name: Fawkner-Whittlesea Blues
- Nickname: The Blues
- Founded: 2004
- Dissolved: 2006
- Ground: Epping Stadium, Epping; Melbourne, Victoria
- Capacity: 12,000
Home colours	Away colours

Fawkner-Whittlesea Blues is a former Australian association football (soccer) club based in Epping, Victoria, a suburb of Melbourne, Victoria. The club was formed towards the end of 2004 from a merger of the senior teams of the Fawkner Blues (founded 1965) and Whittlesea Stallions (founded 2000), and played in the 2005 and 2006 Victorian Premier League seasons. At the end of 2006, Fawkner and Whittlesea dissolved the merger, with Fawkner opting to go back to being a stand-alone club, and Whittlesea forming a partnership with Bulleen to form the Whittlesea Zebras.
