= Marcinho (footballer, born 1978) =

Brazilian footballer

Personal information
- Full name: Márcio Franco da Silva
- Date of birth: 28 August 1978 (age 48)
- Place of birth: Mossoró, Brazil
- Height: 1.59 m (5 ft 3 in)
- Position: Forward

Youth career
- 1992–1996: Ferroviário
- 1997: Rio Branco-SP

Senior career*
Years	Team	Apps	(Gls)
1998–1999	América-SP		
1999–2002	Guarani		
2003	Brasiliense		
2005	15 de Novembro		
2006	Mineiros		
2006	Gama		
2007	CRAC		
2008	América-SP		
2010	Jataiense		
- * Club domestic league appearances and goals as of 31 October 2023

Márcio Franco da Silva (born 28 August 1978), better known as Marcinho, is a Brazilian former professional footballer who played as a forward.

== Career ==
Skillful and fast, Marcinho attracted attention due to his short stature (1.59 m), one of the smallest in Brazilian football history (later equaled by Elton). His stature was the result of the onset of polio.

== Honours ==
América

- Campeonato Paulista Série A2: 1999
