= List of Serbian soccer clubs in Australia =

As one of the many immigrant groups in Australia, the Serbian Australians have contributed to the development of soccer in Australia by the formation of numerous organized soccer clubs across most states and territories in Australia.

The oldest of these clubs are FK Beograd and Fitzroy City Serbia, founded in 1952 and 1963, respectively. These clubs have competed in the State League South Australia as well as participating in the Karadjordje Cup which has been held every year since 1988.

This is a list of Serbian soccer clubs in Australia:

New South Wales

- Bonnyrigg White Eagles FC
- Bonnyrigg FC
- Albion Park White Eagles FC
- Liverpool Sports Club
- Sydney Eagles FC

Victoria

- Casey Kings Krajina FC
- FC Melbourne Srbija
- Noble Park Drina FC
- Springvale White Eagles FC
- Westgate Sindjelic FC

Queensland

- United Eagles FC
- Saint George Willawong FC

Western Australia

- Dianella White Eagles SC
- Maddington Eagles FC

Australian Capital Territory

- Canberra White Eagles FC

South Australia

- FK Beograd

== See also ==
- List of sports clubs inspired by others
- List of Croatian soccer clubs in Australia
- List of Greek Soccer clubs in Australia
- List of Italian Soccer clubs in Australia
