= Brunswick Latvia FC =

Football club based in Latvia

Brunswick Latvia
- Full name: Brunswick Latvia Football Club
- Founded: 1955; 71 years ago as 'Brunswick'
- Dissolved: 1959; 67 years ago
- Ground: Royal Park
- League: Football Victoria State Leagues
Home colours

Brunswick Latvia Football Club was an Australian association football (soccer) club based in the inner-northern suburbs of Melbourne. The club was founded in 1955 as 'Brunswick' by the Latvian community and competed in the Victorian state league system throughout its existence, until its dissolvement at the conclusion of the 1959 season.

== History ==
The club was initially known as 'Brunswick', assumably being named after the relevant inner-northern suburb where many European immigrants settled in Melbourne following the second world war. Throughout its entire existence, the kit colours consisted of a blue jersey with white sleeves, white shorts, and hooped blue & white socks. In its final season in 1959, the club was renamed as 'Brunswick Latvia'.

The club were premiers of the 'Victoria Metropolitan League South', being the southern conference of the modern day Victorian State League 1, which was the fourth state league tier at the time which was achieved in its inaugural season of 1955. The club's highest ladder achievement in its highest level of competition was in 1958 where the club finished eighth in the 'Victorian Metropolitan League Division One North', being the northern conference of the modern-day National Premier Leagues Victoria 2, being the state's second division at the time. The club's last season was the following season in 1959, and throughout its existence all of the club's home matches were played on the soccer ovals of Royal Park in the neighboring suburb of Parkville.

== Honours ==
- Metropolitan League - South (fourth division)

Premiers (1): 1955
