= List of Italian soccer clubs in Australia =

The Italian community of Australia has played an influential role in the history of Australian soccer. Numerous clubs have been formed over the years in every state and territory, where present there are at least thirty active Italian football clubs competing in official senior competitions.

== History ==
The first Italian football and sporting club established in Australia was Charlestown City Blues FC, founded in 1963. In 2019, the club was renamed Charlestown Azzurri FC. Numerous clubs took various types of inspirations from professional clubs in Italy. It has officially been acknowledged that five clubs took inspiration from Juventus, and another two from AC Milan and US Triestina.

It is debated regarding which club is the most successful and has the largest following. Marconi Stallions FC leads in the most National Soccer League championships, being equal first in the league total. Adelaide City FC acquired the most NSL Cups, and is the only Italian club to have become a continental champion, winning the OFC Champions League in 1987. Overall, the Italian clubs produced a total of nine national championships, seven national cups, one continental cup, and various state championships and cups respectively.

== National Soccer League participants ==
The following list of clubs participated in the defunct National Soccer League, which was at its time the highest level of soccer in Australia. A total of seven clubs from four states participated, producing a total of nine championships, seven cups and one continental championship, during the league's existence.

Club	Other Name(s)	City/Town	Season(s)	Honour(s)
Adelaide City FC	Adelaide Force FC; Adelaide Juventus FC; Juventus FC	Adelaide	1977 - 2002-03	NSL Champions: 3; 1986, 1991–92, 1991–92: NSL Cup Winners: 3; 1979, 1989, 1991–92: OFC Champions League Champions: 1; 1987
APIA Leichhardt Tigers FC	APIA Leichhardt FC	Sydney	1979 - 1991-92	NSL Champions: 1; 1987: NSL Cup Winners: 1; 1988
Brisbane City FC		Brisbane	1977 - 1986	NSL Cup Winners: 2; 1977, 1978
Brunswick Zebras FC	Brunswick Juventus FC; Brunswick Pumas FC; Melbourne SC	Melbourne	1984 - 1988, 1993-94 - 1994-95	NSL Champions: 1; 1985
Carlton SC		Melbourne	1997-98 - mid-season of 2000-01	
Gippsland Falcons FC	Eastern Pride FC; Morwell Falcons FC	Morwell	1992-93 - 2000-01	
Inter Monaro SC		Queanbeyan	1985 - 1986	
Marconi Stallions FC	Marconi-Fairfield FC	Sydney	1977 - 2003-04	NSL Champions: 4; 1979, 1988, 1989, 1992–93: NSL Cup Winners: 1; 1980

== Clubs by state/territory ==
=== Australian Capital Territory ===
Club	Founded	Location	Status
Canberra Juventus FC	1953	Ainslie, Canberra	NPL

=== New South Wales ===
Club	Founded	Location	Status
APIA Leichhardt FC	1954	Leichhardt, Sydney	NPL
Charlestown Azzurri FC	2009	Charlestown, Lake Macquarie	Northern NPL
Hamilton Azzurri FC	1963	Hamilton North, Newcastle	AA'Men & O'35 Newcastle Football Community
Inter Lions SC	1983	Concord, Sydney	NSW League One
Inter Monaro SC	1967	Queanbeyan, Southern Tablelands	Amalgamated with Monaro Panthers FC, 1995
Marconi Stallions FC	1958	Fairfield, Sydney	NPL
Monaro Panthers FC	1995	Queanbeyan, Southern Tablelands	NPL Australian Capital Territory
Port Kembla FC	1966	Primbee, Wollongong	Illawarra Premier League

=== Northern Territory ===
Club	Founded	Location	Status
University Azzurri FC	1999	Casuarina, Darwin	NorZone Premier League
Verdi FC	1970	East Side, Alice Springs	Southern Zone Premier League

=== Queensland ===
Club	Founded	Location	Status
Across the Waves FC	1958	Bundaberg	FQPL3 Wide Bay
Brisbane City FC	1952	Newmarket, Brisbane	NPL
AC Carina FC	1986	Brisbane Abruzzo Club, Brisbane, Queensland	Football Queensland Premier League 3
Merrimac FC	1978	Clear Island Waters, Gold Coast	Gold Coast League 1

=== South Australia ===
Club	Founded	Location	Status
Adelaide Blue Eagles	1958	Marden, Adelaide	State League 1
Adelaide City	1946	Oakden, Adelaide	NPL
Campbelltown City	1963	Newton, Adelaide	NPL
Fulham United	1970	Fulham Gardens, Adelaide	State League 1
MetroStars	1994	Klemzig, Adelaide	NPL
Northern Demons	1951	Port Pirie South, Port Pirie	State League 2
Savoy SC	1949	Solomontown, Port Pirie	SAASL
Western Strikers	1980	Royal Park, Adelaide	State League 2

=== Tasmania ===
Club	Founded	Location	Status
Clarence Zebras FC	2019	Howrah, Hobart	NPL Tasmania
Launceston City FC	1958	Prospect Vale, Launceston	NPL Tasmania

=== Western Australia ===
Club	Founded	Location	Status
Balcatta FC	1977	Balcatta, Perth	NPL
Bayswater City SC	1961	Bayswater, Perth	NPL
Fremantle City FC	2014	Beaconsfield, Perth	SL 1
Perth Azzurri SC	1948	West Perth, Perth	NPL

== See also ==
- Italian Australians
- List of sports clubs inspired by others
- List of Croatian soccer clubs in Australia
- List of Greek soccer clubs in Australia
- List of Serbian soccer clubs in Australia
