= Colatina Sociedade Esportiva =

Colatina
- Full name: Colatina Sociedade Esportiva
- Founded: December 18, 2009
- Ground: Estádio Municipal Justiniano de Melo e Silva, Colatina, Espírito Santo state, Brazil
- Capacity: 12,000
Home colours	Away colours

Colatina Sociedade Esportiva, commonly known as Colatina, is a Brazilian football club based in Colatina, Espírito Santo state.

== History ==
The club was founded on December 18, 2009. They finished in the third position in the Campeonato Capixaba Second Level in 2010, being promoted to the 2011 edition of Campeonato Capixaba after the runners-up Estrela do Norte was penalized.

== Honours ==
=== Women's Football ===
- Campeonato Capixaba de Futebol Feminino
  - Winners (1): 2011

== Stadium ==
Colatina Sociedade Esportiva play their home games at Estádio Municipal Justiniano de Melo e Silva. The stadium has a maximum capacity of 12,000 people.
