= Kew East, Victoria =

Kew East
- Suburb
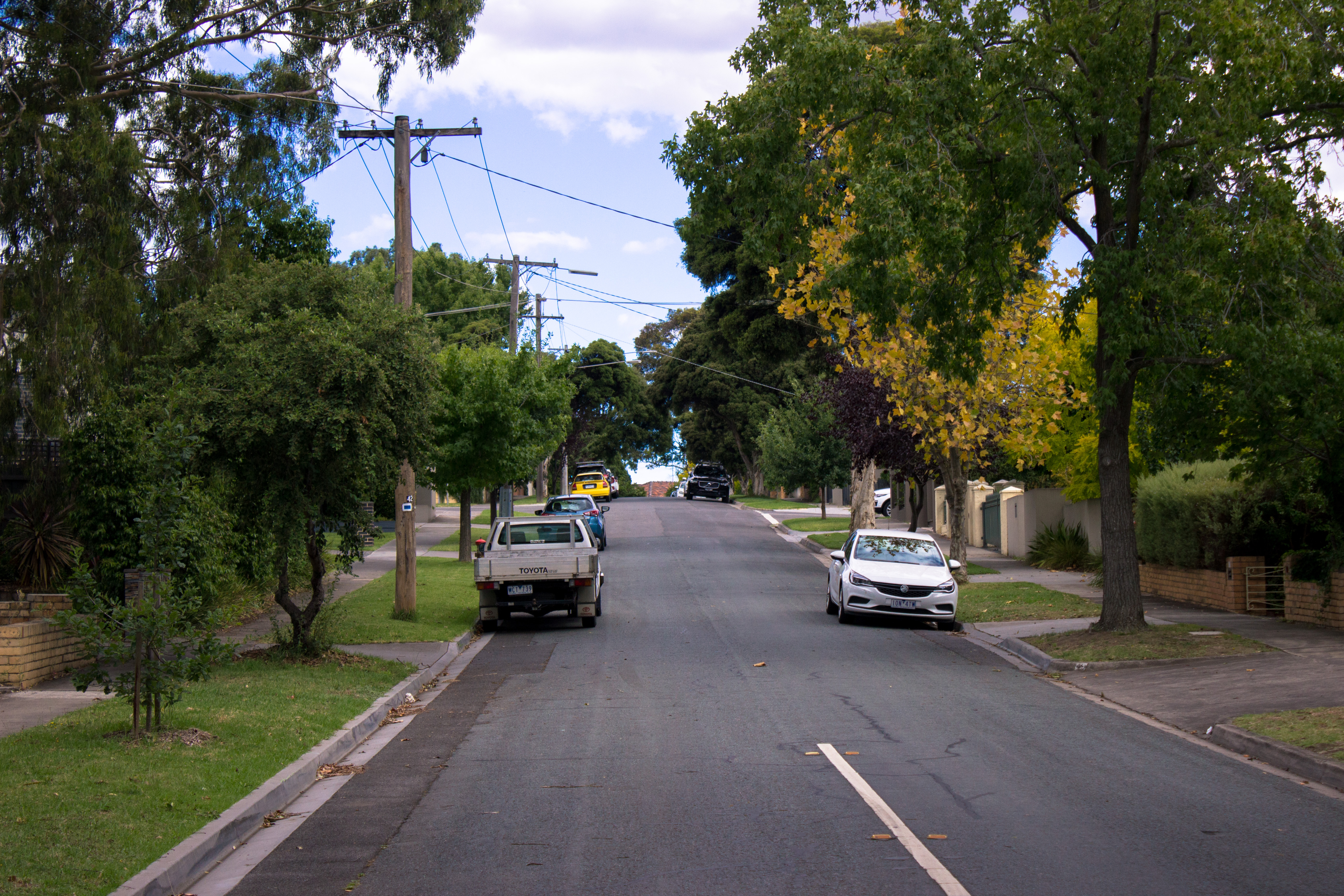
- White Avenue, Kew East

- Interactive map of Kew East
- Coordinates: 37°47′49″S 145°3′25″E
- Country: Australia
- State: Victoria
- City: Melbourne
- LGA: City of Boroondara
- Location: 8 km (5.0 mi) from Melbourne

Government
  - State electorate: Kew
  - Federal division: Kooyong

Area
  - Total: 4 km^{2} (1.5 sq mi)
- Elevation: 40 m (130 ft)

Population
  - Total: 6,620 (SAL 2021)
- Postcode: 3102
Suburbs around Kew East
Ivanhoe	Ivanhoe East	Bulleen
Alphington	Kew East	Balwyn North
Kew	Kew	Balwyn

Kew East is a suburb of Melbourne, Victoria, Australia, 8 km (5.0 mi) east from the Melbourne central business district, located within the City of Boroondara local government area. Kew East recorded a population of 6,620 at the 2021 census.

The suburb was developed as a series of small farming estates and communities. It expanded rapidly with the development of tramways and railways, including the now-closed Outer Circle railway line which had a station in Kew East. Today it is a mostly residential suburb with some small remnants of its agricultural past.

== History ==
Kew East is located on the traditional lands of the Wurundjeri people. They are represented by the Wurundjeri Woi Wurrung Cultural Heritage Aboriginal Corporation.

A number of farming properties were established along the Yarra River following government land auctions, between 1845 and 1847. The Wills family established "Willsmere Estate", a grazing and dairying property, with the name now reflected in Willsmere Road and Willsmere Park. William Wade established a farm, named "Belford", next door. A flood in December 1863 devastated the property, which later became the Kew Golf Course. Located on the golf course is the Hoddle survey tree – a River Red Gum – that, from 1844, served as a survey marker for Robert Hoddle's mapping of the area, incorporating both Kew East and Kew. The tree was added to the Victorian Heritage Register and the National Trust's register of significant trees.

The Harp of Erin Hotel, on the corner of Harp Road and High Street, was established in 1854, by Edward Glynn. It was a centre for race meetings and gave its name to Harp Road, which was part of a route to Lilydale, used by Cobb & Co.

The Kew East Post Office opened around 1924. The Maternal and Child Health Centre, in Strathalbyn Street, was added to the Victorian Heritage Register. Opened in December 1925, it is the earliest purpose-built and intact baby health centre in the state.

In 2020, the Eastern Freeway truck crash, which received national news coverage, occurred in the suburb.

=== Street names ===
Windella Road was originally named Balfour Road, after Kew resident and politician James Balfour. It was renamed to Windella Avenue, after Balfour's residence Windella, due to the similarity of the former name to that of nearby Belford Road. Longstaff, Leason, McCubbin, Newbury, Frater and Lister Streets are all named after Australian painters.

== Geography ==
The suburb is bounded to the east by Burke Road, to the north by the Yarra River and to the west by the Yarra River, parts of Kilby and Willsmere Roads and the property boundaries between Willsmere Road and Rattan Avenue. The southern boundary follows Carnegie Avenue, Park Crescent, Earl Street, Asquith Street, property boundaries near Belford Road (south), High Street and Harp Road. The Eastern Freeway runs across the centre of the suburb from east to west.

=== Demographics ===
As of 2016, 68.2% of residents were born in Australia, 4.3% were born in China, 2.4% in England, 2.1% in Italy and 23% were born elsewhere.

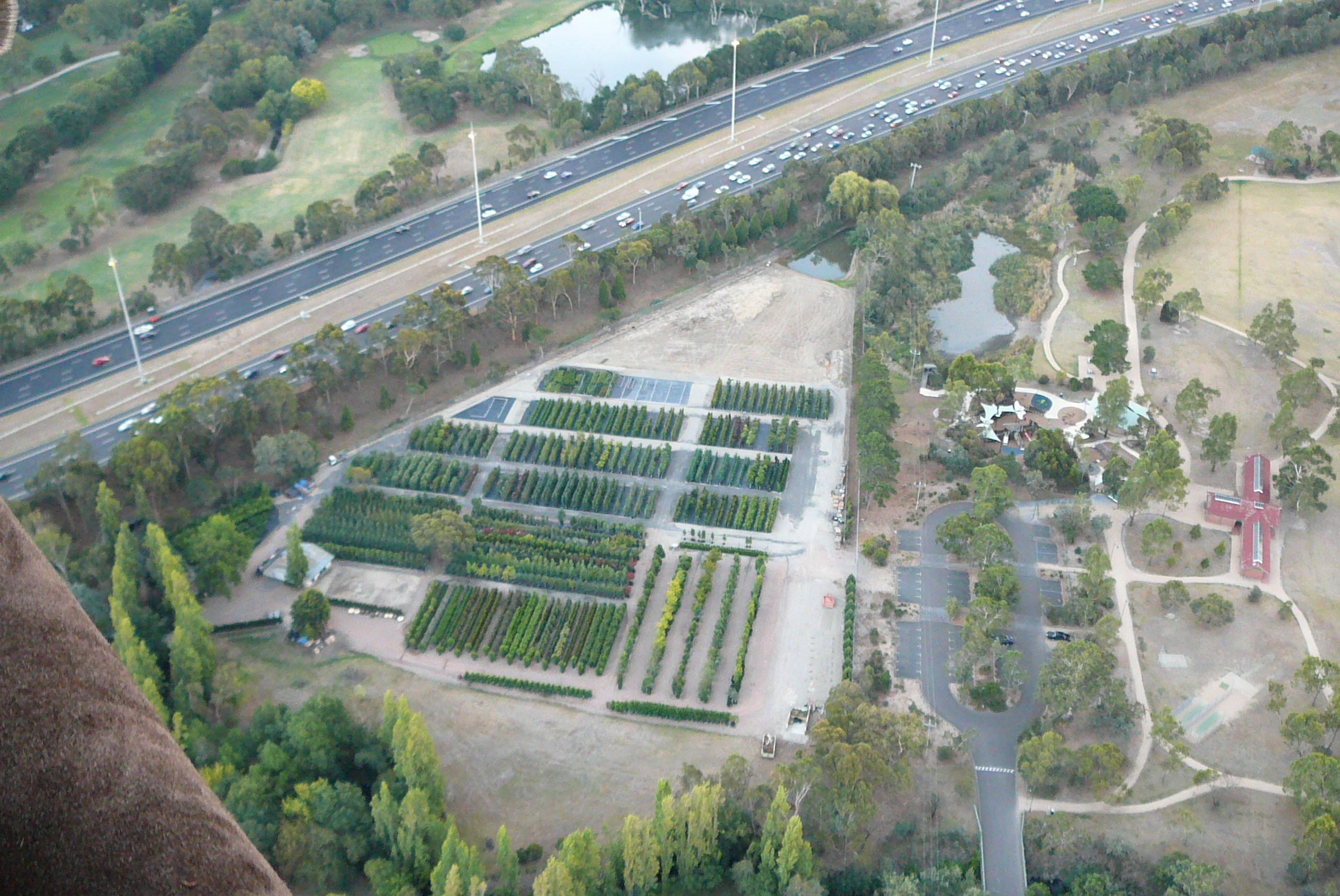
Hays Paddock and neighbouring nursery, bounded by Eastern Freeway.

== Economy ==
The main shopping area, "Harp Village", is located on High Street, near the intersection with Harp Road. A small local centre, Belford Court Shopping Centre, is located on Belford Road.

== Transport ==
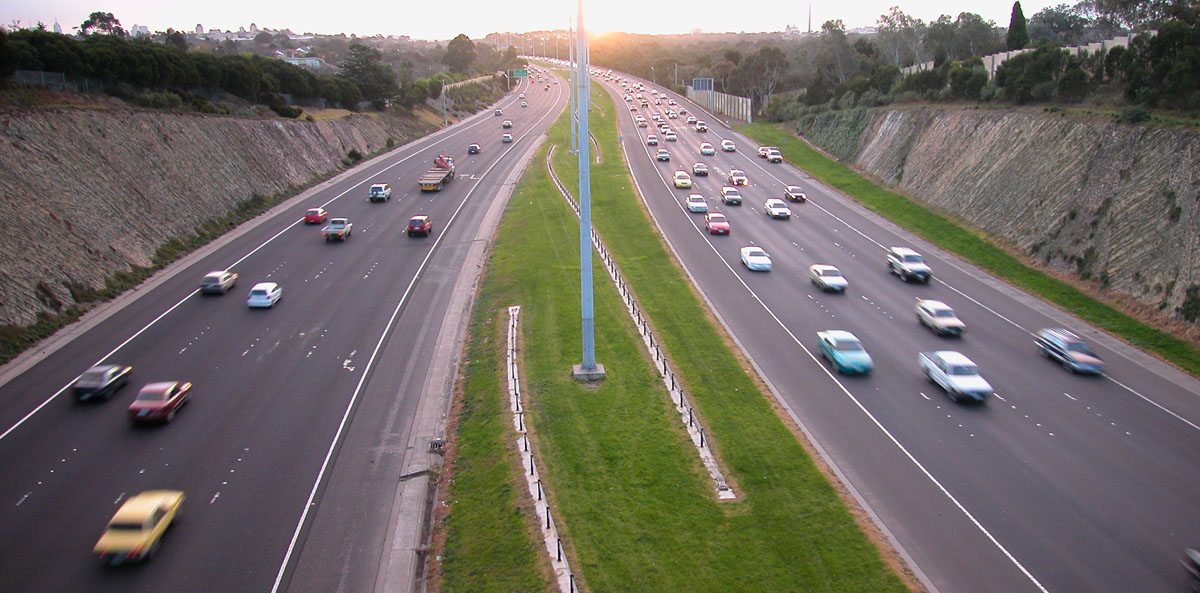
The Eastern Freeway looking west from the Belford Road overpass

=== Road ===
The Eastern Freeway is accessible via the Chandler Highway or Burke Road. The Main Yarra Trail, a shared bicycle and pedestrian path, runs along the north side of the freeway. Belford Road bridges the freeway, providing a link to the northern part of the suburb.

=== Public transport ===
The suburb has a tram line along High Street, which is served by route 48. There are also a number of CDC Melbourne and Kinetic Melbourne bus routes which connect the suburb to surrounding areas.

== Education ==
=== Schools ===
There are two co-educational government schools located in Kew East — Kew High School, a secondary college located on Burke Road and Kew East Primary School on Kitchener Street. St Annes Catholic School is located on Beresford Street.

== Sports ==
Old Xaverians SC (left) and Plenty Valley Lions FC (right) observing a minute silence before a Victorian State League Division 4 Reserves match at Hays Paddock, 27 April 2019

Kew Golf Club and Green Acres Golf Club on Elm Grove are located in the north of the suburb. Parks in Kew East include Willsmere-Chandler Park, home of one of the suburb's three soccer clubs, East Kew United Soccer club, and the adjacent Kew Billabong, Hays Paddock on Glass Creek, is home to the Old Xaverians Soccer Club, Melbourne Deaf Cricket Club and Melbourne Deaf Soccer Club. Hyde Park, Harrison Park and Stradbroke Park are located in the south-east of the suburb.

== Places of worship ==
Places of worship include:

- St Paul's Anglican Church, located on the corner of Windella Avenue and Hale Street.
- East Kew Uniting Church, Normanby Road.
- MWP Centre, Westbrook Street.
- St Anne's Catholic Church, Windellla Avenue.
- The Leo Baeck Centre for Progressive Judaism, Harp Road.

== See also ==
- City of Kew – Kew East was previously within this former local government area.
