= Brunswick Juventus FC =

Australian soccer club

Brunswick Juventus
- Full name: Brunswick Juventus Football Club
- Nickname: Zebras
- Founded: 1948 as part of Juventus; 1997 as Bulleen Inter Kings; 2000 as Bulleen Zebras; 2007 as Whittlesea Zebras; 2011 as Moreland Zebras
- Ground: CB Smith Reserve
- League: Victoria Premier League 1
- 2026: 2nd of 14 (promoted) NPL Victoria 2027
- Website: https://brunswickjuventus.com/
Home colours	Away colours

Brunswick Juventus FC is an Australian soccer club based in the Melbourne suburb of Fawkner. The club currently competes in the Victoria Premier League 1 (VPL 1).

The earliest traces of the club date back to 1948 with the founding of Brunswick Zebras, and was officially founded in 1997 with mergers and de-mergers occurring between Italian backed clubs within the Italian community of Melbourne.

== History ==
=== Foundings, mergers and de-mergers (1997–2008) ===
The club was founded in 1997 as a merger of several Italian backed football clubs in Melbourne, being the senior teams of Box Hill Inter, Brunswick Zebras (partially) and Bulleen Lions, to become 'Bulleen Inter Kings' being based at the Veneto Club in Bulleen. As the Brunswick senior team was broken into two separate entities, one being the part that makes as then Moreland Zebras, and the other part later becoming part of rivals Whittlesea Ranges, the history of the club regarding events prior to 1997 have been disputed since. Whilst the senior teams had merged, all three original standalone clubs maintained junior academies at their respective original home venues. In 2000 Box Hill completely de-merged, resulting in the club becoming 'Bulleen Zebras FC'. Bulleen would follow suit in 2007 becoming a standalone club again, with the former Brunswick senior side moving Epping Stadium. The Brunswick senior team did not return to its original Sumner Park in Brunswick East and not formally re-merge with its junior side, as the junior had developed its own a senior side in response to player surplus.

The separated senior side would later merge with the Whittlesea group of the de-merged Fawkner-Whittlesea Blues to become Whittlesea Stallions. Two years later in 2009, the Whittlesea group would de-merge with the Brunswick seniors and merge with the Thomastown Devils to become Whittlesea Ranges; future Europa League-winning manager Ange Postecoglou was hired to oversee the club's fortunes. In 2011 the senior side would rename itself as Moreland Zebras, formally relocating to CB Smith Reserve and develop its own junior academy. As of 2019, the original club Brunswick Zebras, the Moreland Zebras, and Whittlesea Ranges all claim a lineage to the history and accolades achieved prior to 1997.

=== 2011–present ===
In 2011, the club was crowned Victorian State League Division 1 champions. After being crowned champions, club members decided at the annual general meeting that the club would relocate to the City of Moreland (now City of Merri-bek). The club's name was then changed to Moreland Zebras and played out of DeChene Reserve in Coburg.

In 2015, the club's seniors moved into the facilities at CB Smith Reserve, while the juniors continued to be based out of DeChene Reserve. The Zebras finished in second place in the NPL 1 West division in 2015 and qualified for a playoff match against Melbourne Victory's NPL team. Despite scoring early, the Zebras lost the game 2–1 and remained in the NPL1 division for 2016, now named NPL2.

After the departure of senior head coach Danny Gnjidic at the end of the 2016 NPL2 West season, in which Moreland finished in 5th place, the Zebras appointed former player Fausto De Amicis as the new manager of the first team. Moreland finished in 2nd place in 2017, five points off promoted Northcote City. In the promotion playoff, the Zebras lost 1–0 to Dandenong City.

For the 2018 season, Juventus signed former A-League players Jake Barker-Daish, Rashid Mahazi and Jakob Williams. The Zebras held second position of the table for extended periods of the 2018 season, but with just one win from their last six games, Moreland were overtaken by both St Albans and North Geelong Warriors in the table, leaving them in 4th place at the end of the 2018 season.

In the 2019 season, Zebras qualified for the final stages of the FFA Cup, beating Victorian top division side Altona Magic in the qualifying rounds. In the Round of 32, Moreland beat fellow Victorian NPL2 qualifiers Bulleen Lions. In the Round of 16, Zebras beat NPL Queensland side Magpies Crusaders 4–0 in front of over 1,300 at CB Smith Reserve and became the first ever third-tier side to qualify for the FFA Cup quarter-finals.

In September 2019, Zebras midfielder Dhour Chol was called up for the South Sudan national team.

In 2022, the club announced that it changed its name to Brunswick Juventus Football Club, which is disputed by Brunswick Zebras.

== Honours ==
- Victorian First Tier/NPL Victoria
  - Champions (2): 1998, 2004
- Victorian Second Tier
  - Runner-up (1): 2026
- Victorian Third Tier
  - Playoff Winners(1): 2025
- Victorian State League
  - Premiers (1): 2011

== Notable former players ==
- (Australia) Andrew Nabbout
- (Australia) Jake Barker-Daish
- (Australia) Mark Bresciano
- (Australia) Michael Theo
- (Australia) Rashid Mahazi
- (Australia) Ricky Diaco
- (Australia) Daniel Morandin
- (Republic of Ireland) Vinny Faherty
