= Old Xaverians SC =

Old Xaverians
- Full name: Old Xaverians Soccer Club Inc.
- Nicknames: Old Xavs; Xavier
- Short name: OXSC
- Founded: 2002 February 28; 24 years ago
- Ground: Hays Paddock; Xavier College
- President: Gianluca Righele
- Head Coach: Anthony Fameli
- League: Metropolitan League 2 North–West
- 2026: League: 1st (Premiers); Finals: Champions
- Website: oxsc.com.au
Home colours	Away colours	Third colours

The Old Xaverians Soccer Club is an Australian semi-professional soccer club based in the Melbourne suburb of Kew East. The club was founded in February 2002 by alumni & parents of Jesuit school Xavier College with backing from the Old Xaverian Association, the Associated Old Boys Soccer Association, the school's administration, and members of Melbourne's Italian community.

Operating under license from Football Victoria, the club fields a Senior Men's squad that competes in the Melbourne Metropolitan Men's league system, and operates a mixed gender youth academy. From 2012 to 2021, the club also fielded a Senior Women's squad that competed in the Victorian Women's state league system.

== History ==
=== Establishment and debut season (2001–2002) ===
The Old Xaverians Soccer Club was established in early 2002 following a meeting of Xavier College alumni in November 2001. The Steering Committee consisted of Peter De Luca, Jamie McCormack, James Nicholls, John Ubaldi, Peter Clyne and Phil Barcellona. The club was founded in tradition of other prominent Old Xaverians sporting clubs, and is a member of the Old Xaverian Association and the Associated Old Boys Soccer Association, along with support of the school's administration and Melbourne's Italian community.

Former Victorian Premier League and Brunswick Juventus midfielder Luciano Fioravanti was signed as inaugural Senior Men's head coach, and the club was successfully granted entry into the independent Amateur Soccer Federation Victoria (ASFV) for the 2002 season. The club's inaugural season was a success having fielded three teams, in which all were competitive that saw the senior squad earn their first premiership and cup tournament victory. The senior squad finished first on the ladder of ASFV division 2, the reserve squad finished second in the respective reserve league, and the thirds, then known as 'the Socials' finished fourth in the higher division of ASFV Division 1. The club's first-ever match was played at Xavier College against Arlaadi United in what would be a dominant 9–0 victory with a squad average age of 20. At the season's conclusion, the senior team had finished first on the ladder, with the reserves finishing third, and the thirds finishing fourth, creating a culture of both enjoyment but with success to follow. Bundesliga and Swiss Super League veteran Peter Közle assisted in steering the club and its players in development, later earning him a spot in the club's team of the decade in 2012. At the annual general meeting, it was voted on and decided by the members that the club would pursue a license to compete in state league competitive football for 2003, and this was granted by Football Victoria.

=== First stint in State League football (2003–2006) ===
The senior men's squad of 2006.

The club's first season of state league would be the eastern conference of the tier seven league, then known as the 'Provisional League 3'. Both the senior and reserves teams were to compete in this league whilst thirds and veterans' teams were kept in the amateur leagues. With a mid table finish for 2003, the seniors finished second on the ladder for 2004, an outcome that had depended on the final game of the season against Endeavour Hills. The match finished in a 5–1 emphatic victory with future team of the decade forward Anthony De Luca scoring four to secure promotion. It would be the first and last achievement at Myrtle Park in Balwyn before the club would move its home matches and administration to Hays Paddock in Kew East, and training at Willsmere Park also in Kew East, which is still effective as of September 2019. The conclusion of the season also saw the introduction of the 'Paul Trimboli' medal to be awarded to the highest goal scorer of the club across all teams, named after the former Xaverian and multiple National Soccer League championship winner, as well as a winner of multiple awards for the Socceroos.

Although setting newer and stronger foundations for the club by moving to Hays Paddock, 2005 saw a tougher year for the club but ended in relief when senior team narrowly avoided relegation in the last of the season. The first match at 'Hays' ended in a 2–2 draw with the future league winner Brandon Park on 9 April in round two. The second game would be the week after in round three on 16 April would be the first day of victory against fellow old boys club Old Melburnians, finishing in a 4–1 victory. OXSC, already in the relegation zone of the ladder were to play the third-placed Lyndale United away who needed to win to be promoted. An against all odds 5–2 victory saw the club avoid relegation, and stop Lyndale from being promoted. However, celebrations that day were kept minimal as two serious injuries had occurred in the reserves game prior. 2006 would be another tough year for the club with decision to withdraw veterans team and have the thirds compete in the state league as well. The senior battled hard during the season but managed to avoid relegation again after a 7–0 victory over last place and to be relegated, Noble Park. At the annual general meeting, despite being competitive enough as a club to remain in sixth tier knowing that there were multiple tiers below, it was decided that the club would make a full return to the amateur leagues with the intentions to return to state football at an unstated later date. This would not occur until late 2010.

=== Returning to Amateur football (2007–2010) ===
The 2007 and 2008 seasons would prove to be years of resetting foundations of the club to ensure future success. 2007 saw all three teams, seniors, reserves and thirds all finishing mid table in their respective divisions. 2008 saw both the seniors and reserves come close to first place with Middle Park being consistent in their dominant season, with thirds finishing mid table in their respective division. Success was finally brought to Hays Paddock in 2009 with both the seniors and reserves finish strongly in both divisions with new nemesis Middle Park coming close in both leagues. Coming off a broken leg in 2008, former Bradford City and Guiseley player Liam Flynn was crucial to the success of the season in scoring fifteen goals and providing thirteen assists in his sixteen appearances for the club, earning him both the Paul Trimboli medal and club best and fairest. The reserves were undefeated for the season with seventeen wins and five draws, with victory of round eighteen proving to be the sealing match of the season, again over nemesis Middle Park. The thirds continued to battle on finishing ninth for the season. 2010 saw the reserves team for the first time in the club's history win back-to-back championships, with the seniors and thirds both finishing mid table respectively. It was decided at the 2010 annual general meeting that the club would reapply for an FFV state league license, and was granted.

=== Returning to State League football and new foundations (2011–2012) ===
Upon successful application for a state football license, the club fielded three teams in various state league divisions. The club also reincarnated the veterans' team due to an abundance of players but was kept in the amateur league. Positive signs were present at the season's conclusions with the seniors and reserves both finishing third in their respective divisions of 'Men's Thirds 1' (then tier nine) and 'Men's Thirds 3' (then tier eleven) in the south-eastern conference. The thirds finished fourth for the state's fourteenth tier, then known as 'Men's Thirds 6' participating in the south-eastern conference, and the veterans, then nicknamed 'the ducks' finished fifth in the amateur division one afternoon reserves competition. It would be the last time as of 2019 that the club has fielded a team in the amateur divisions, as the club successfully entered the veterans team into the state league system for 2012. The new year would also be of a major step forward for the football club with the decision to establish a females' football department, with both senior & reserves teams having immediate entry into the state league system.

2012 saw success and positive signs for the respective five sides within the club. The senior men's squad celebrated its third championship, being its first in-state league premiership in the Men's Thirds 1 league, following a close third-placed finished in 2011. The reserve men's and senior women's squads would both finish mid table within their respective leagues, while the men's third squad finished second in the Men's Thirds Division 5 North-Western conference. The veterans finished near the bottom but would create strong chemistry between the playing group as a result that would see tremendous success in the years to follow. Both the men's thirds and veterans would be promoted by three tiers following a reshuffle of teams in the state league competition.

Mid season, the club celebrated its ten-year anniversary at the prestigious Crown Palladium Ballroom. By this time, the club had achieved two titles and four runners-up achievements across its five teams with the men's seniors and thirds teams to achieve their awards that year. The club announced its team of the decade featuring Ennis La Torre, Paul Marazita, Nicholas Butler, Matthew Clyne, Michael Sette, Liam Flynn, Michael Fragale, Andrew Vittadello, Gianni Bramante, Adrian Ubaldi, Anthony De Luca, D Clyne, Daniel Prossimo, Joseph Robilotta, Marco Stella, and Thomas Voss. A second team due to the extensive global network created by the school, thus being named as the 'International team of the decade' for players living overseas or were born overseas. This list consisted of Brown, Hainsworth, Michael Esnault, Ashe, Antoni, Andrew Kavanagh, Callahan, Peter Kozle, Juan De La Pava, Giorgio Perelli, Liam Flynn, Balaton, Ficici, Longo, Melvin, Tamanas, and Toomey. Current (as of 2019) vice-president Damian Cilmi and Luciano Fioravanti were also named as the respective coaches of the two teams.

=== Success and promotions (2013–2016) ===
The four seasons of 2013 through to 2016 would see five championships and four promotions across all five teams respectively. Across the men's reserves, thirds and veterans teams, the club saw championship achievement across all four years. The men's senior squad would start the era slowly by finishing mid table of the Victorian State League Division 5 (tier seven) eastern conference for 2013. After learning from the hardships and disappointments of 2013, the team would finish second in 2014, resulting in promotion from division five (tier seven) to division four in the eastern conference. 2015 and 2016 would see mid table finishes for both seasons but would set up the team for a strong year in 2017.

The men's reserve squad would enjoy a successful era in this time, finishing in the top three in all four relevant seasons. The squad finished second twice in a row for the 2013 and 2014 seasons in the state league five reserve's division, but would finally win its first state league championship in 2015 by finishing first in the state league four reserve's division by one point ahead of University of Melbourne SC. In 2016 a handful of player departures would negatively affect the squad which would also affect the thirds. Some unlucky results on the day despite valiant efforts would see the team fall to third for 2016. Despite being on equal points with Ringwood City, the victories of the reserve games would often be won more than two three goals which saw the team have goal difference as an asset as team finished ahead by fifteen goals.

Following the first of multiple team and league reshuffles of the metropolitan league system by Football Federation Victoria, the men's thirds squad would start and end the 2013–2016 era with difficulty but did win its first championship and achieve promotion in this time. After being promoted three tiers by default following the runners-up achievement for tier thirteen in 2012, the team would finish tier ten in second last of the south-eastern conference for 2013, then known as the 'Metropolitan League Four'. With a major reshuffling of the metro system occurring again in early 2014, the thirds were demoted back to tier thirteen, then renamed to its current name of 'Metropolitan League Six' but this time in the south-eastern conference. With roughly the same team from 2012 enduring hardships of 2013 in a higher division, the team would bond together and win its first and only championship, which is also the club's only championship in thirteenth tier to date. The resulting first-place finish would see the team be promoted to the twelfth tier, 'Metropolitan League Five' and would finish mid table in both the 2015 and 2016 seasons of the south-eastern conference.

2013 would be the beginning of a successful time for the veterans team, seeing promotions & championships twice times after finishing in the top three in all seasons of the 2013–2016 era. Following the first of multiple metro reshuffles, early 2013 would see both the thirds & veterans be promoted three tiers by default. The veterans rose from tier fourteen, then known as 'Men's Thirds 6' of the north-western conference, to tier eleven now known as 'Metropolitan League Five', also in the north-western conference. Unlike the thirds that struggled with the promotion by default, the veterans would lead the league for most of the season and winning the championship in the last round. The team would beat second place Heidelberg Stars 3–0 at Hays Paddock ending the season six points above the stars, in what would be their first of three championships to date. 2014 would see the team physically promoted but technically remaining in the same tier following the introduction of the National Premier Leagues system. The higher level didn't stop the veterans from being competitive, with heart breaking but valiant efforts resulted in the team finishing second for 2014 by one goal on goal difference ahead of Preston Lions, and third for 2015. It was these results that drove the veterans team to win the eleventh tier championship, known as the Metropolitan League four in the north-western conference after three close attempts. First place was battled until the last round with Old Xaverians finishing on top by one point ahead of Hoppers Crossing. With both teams winning their last two games, the veterans' four-point lead was dealt a blow in round sixteen against University of Melbourne SC after a 0–1 loss at Princes Park. The ultimate final difference that won the title for the veterans came the week before in round fifteen being out of their control, with University drawing 2–2 with Hoppers Crossing at Hoppers' home ground. One on one, Old Xaverians drew and lost to Hoppers during the regular season but with luck on the veteran's side, it was the match drawn thanks to University that made the difference, resulting in promotion for the second time in three years.

=== Mixed results and team changes (2017–2019) ===
The 2017–2019 era saw success with another championship, three runners-up awards resulting in two promotions throughout the football club. The era would also saw the establishment of the women's reserve squad, but also the temporary closing of both the men's thirds and veterans squads due to player shortages despite award-winning results between the two. The seniors and reserve teams would competitive in this era but came with no reward. The best result achieved was the seniors finishing third in 2017 of the Victorian State League Division 4 eastern conference but would then finish sixth in 2018, whilst the reserves finished fourth in the reserve division for both relevant seasons. The two teams of the club were both invited to participate in the trial of the new Video assistant referee for the A-League at Docklands Stadium midway through the season. It was the success of thirds, veterans, senior & reserve women squads that would make the era rather positively memorable.

The thirds for 2017 were rezoned to the north-western conference from the south-east of the Metropolitan League five following due to location clashes of other promoted and relegated teams. This would prove to a breath of fresh air for the team two mid table finishes in 2015 and 2016 that would result in a close second-place finish behind Hume United. Despite some unlucky results on multiples match days, the thirds made a strong resurgence towards the end of the season but the ultimate factors would consist losing to Hume away 5–2 on round fifteen, and a close but unlucky 3–3 draw earlier to Gisborne in round ten. At the season's conclusion, it would be decided to discontinue the thirds team until further notice due to an insufficient number of players throughout the club to field four men's teams, being that there would only be enough players to sufficiently field three. The club logically voted to return the tier twelve license belonging to the thirds as the veterans team license was to be promoted from tier ten to tier nine for 2018.

The men's veterans squad would continue its successful period following on from 2013 by winning back-to-back championships and promotions for the first time ever in the club's history. Following the 2016 championship of Metropolitan League four north-west, the veterans would finish first again in league three, still within the north-western conference in what would be a close season in which every point would could count. Old Xaverians finished first with forty-six points followed by RMIT FC on forty-four then Moreland United on forty-two. The veterans would beat RMIT early in the season at Hays Paddock 2–0 in round three, but heavily underestimated Moreland in losing 3–0 in round eleven at home with the early loss to Moreland away had clearly not sent the right message. The second loss considerably threatened first place chances as at that point of the season it had become clear that the top three would be battled between Old Xaverians, RMIT and Moreland. Despite both losses of the season being against Moreland, Old Xaverians would recommence their undefeated streak of the season with the three season-defining factors being the round twelve 3–3 draw to RMIT away in the week after, Moreland losing 1–2 to Coonan Hills at home in round sixteen, and RMIT drawing with fourth-placed Glenroy Lions at home in round fourteen. The top three finishing era would come to an end in 2018 with the veterans being competitive but narrowly finishing fourth after being promoted to League two north-west. At the conclusion of the season, it was decided to temporarily discontinue the veterans team until further notice, following more player departures throughout all three men's teams with the remaining players being promoted to reserve and senior teams respectively.

The 2017 era started with a sense of optimism for the women's department following the establishment of the reserve team in meeting the demands of multiple player signups. The senior team showed valiance in 2016 after narrowly avoiding relegation in their first season in State League Two following their promotion in 2015. Despite strong victories throughout the season, Croydon City Arrows proved too consistent with the round sixteen 1–2 defeat at home ultimately defining the season. However, the valiant efforts were enough for the seniors to be promoted to State League one, the highest level of state league football below the National Premier Leagues female system. The women's reserve squad would commence their inaugural campaign in the eastern conference of State League four, not the league one reserves, and would make an immediate impact. A strong campaign would see the reserves be serious championship and promotion contenders, but it would be bad luck loss in round seventeen that would make the team finish second, two points behind Old Trinity Grammarians. The transition from league two to league one would be smoother to that of the 2016 promotion with team finishing in fifth for 2018.

The year of 2019 would a year of sporadic results but did have its positives. The club again would embark on a new endeavor by establishing its first-ever juniors academy for boys and girls, backed by Football Federation Australia's junior football incentive, the 'Miniroos'. The club was able to establish two mixed-gender junior teams and be based at Hays Paddock with backing from the City of Boroondara council. In senior football, both the men and women's results varied mainly due to unlucky match day outcomes. At the conclusion of the 2018 season, the club was informed that the men's senior and reserve teams may be rezoned to the northern conference of Victorian State League four due to the locations of promoted and related clubs from divisions three and five, respectively, and this became a reality in 2019. With an unfortunately difficult preseason, the change from east to north would bring two unexpected cultural changes, consisting of fiercer opponents and smaller grounds to play on compared to the eastern conference home grounds and player attitudes. The senior men's team would finish eighth out of twelve, which could've so easily been fifth place with unlucky second half losses to Brunswick Zebras, Heidelberg Eagles, Plenty Valley Lions, and Northern Falcons. The men's reserve squad would do it tougher with both injuries and second-half losses pulling the team down to tenth out of twelve. The women's senior team would again, comfortably, finish mid-table in fifth position after making a strong start to the season, while the reserves fought bravely but were affected by unlucky results on the day and finished last.

Following a double brutal encounter with unruly players from Brunswick Zebras away in the second last round for both the seniors and more particularly the reserves, the two teams would end their tough seasons with smiles in the last round against La Trobe University at Hays Paddock. The reserves match saw the Climate of Melbourne at its finest with the culturally popular term "four seasons in one day" physically becoming reality before and during the game. Whilst both teams were warming up the sun was shining, but eventuated to heavy rain by kick off. By half time the sun was shining again but became overcast and windy by full-time. Whilst the weather was constantly changing, the end-to-end attacking game saw the score be level 3–3 at half time. La Trobe had taken the lead within ninety seconds after kick off but within another six minutes, Old Xaverians would draw level from a corner. La Trobe would take the lead another two times in the first half, only for Old Xaverians to equalize both times almost immediately. The start of the second half saw the same attacking tempo from both teams, with the home team breaking the deadlock first ten minutes after the restart making the scores 4–3. Like in the first half, it would be La Trobe who would equalize almost immediately with an unmarked long shot from outside the eighteen yard box leveling the scores at 4–4. For the next twenty-five minutes, there were extremely close chances at both ends with the respective goal keepers making tremendous saves, including a top right hand corner save from a La Trobe free kick on the edge of the Old Xaverians eighteen yard box. Following two substitutions from Old Xaverians and one from La Trobe towards the last ten minutes, the home side scored the mathematically winning goal that would also be the striker's one hundredth goal in his time with club. The same striker would score in the last minute to end the game 6–4 bringing his career total to 101 goals on what would also be his last game for the club. Another reserve player and two more senior players would declare the round as their last games for the club until further notice. The seniors would also take part in a heavily attacking end-to-end contest and would win 2–1 to end the weekend with maximum points for the men's department.

=== Pandemic disruptions & last seasons in the State Leagues (2020–2022) ===
The new decade saw the club change its logo for the second time in history, with its vision of aligning itself with the logos of the athletics club, cricket club, hockey club, and the football club. The club also discontinued its usage of Nike kits, and reverted to Adidas for the 2020, 2021 and 2022 seasons. The men's squad commenced their 2020 campaign with the senior team losing 1–2 in the first round of the 2020 FFA Cup against La Trobe University at David Barro Stadium. The first round of the league season for both the senior and reserve squads was to be against Northern Falcons on 21 March 2020, however Football Victoria suspended and then eventually cancelled all soccer competitions and related events due to the COVID-19 pandemic. During the second Metropolitan Melbourne lockdown, inaugural Senior Men's head coach Luciano Fioravanti died on 4 September 2020 aged eighty-three.

== Home venues ==
Old Xaverians SC (left) and Plenty Valley Lions FC (right) observing a minute silence before a Victorian State League Division 4 Reserves match at Hays Paddock, 27 April 2019.

Period	Home Ground	Suburb
2002, 2026–Present	Xavier College	Kew
2002	H A Smith Reserve	Hawthorn
2002–2004	Myrtle Park	Balwyn North
2005–Present	Hays Paddock	Kew East

Upon the founding of the club, the school offered the football club temporary use of its sporting facilities until the club could gain tenancy of a ground of its own. After winning their inaugural game at the school grounds, the club temporarily moved to H A Smith Reserve in Hawthorn, sharing with Old Scotch. After a handful of games at the Glenferrie Road site, the club would finish the 2002 ASFV 2 season at Mrtyle Park in Balwyn North, where it would stay for another two years as the club's first permanent home ground. Upon leaving the Balwyn North park at the conclusion of the 2004 Provisional League Three season, the site had seen Old Xaverians celebrate two championships and two promotions.

The start of the 2005 season would see new beginnings for the club in moving to Hays Paddock, with newer facilities and being the only state league club to be based at the ground. During the 2026 season, the club began playing occasional matches at the school's 'Jackson Oval' at the senior campus.

== Colours and kit evolution ==
The colours of the club consist of black, red and white, resembling the logo of Xavier College. The home kit is primarily unique to that of the school's, with the away kit primarily being a fluorescent yellow short, often with black shorts & socks. The club has previously sourced its kits from Covo, Legea, Nike and presently sources from Adidas.

Home

2002	2003	2004–2006	2007–2008	2009–2011	2012	2013–2016	2017–2018	2019	2020–2021	2022–Present

Away

2002–2003	2004–2006	2007–2008	2009–2012	2013–2016	2017–2019	2020–2021	2022–Present

Alternative

2002–2003	2020–2021	2021	2015–Present	2022–Present	2022–Present

== Players ==
=== Men's Squad ===
As of 13 June 2022

Note: Flags indicate national team as defined under FIFA eligibility rules; some limited exceptions apply. Players may hold more than one non-FIFA nationality.

No.	Pos.	Nation	Player
—	GK	AUS	Chris Ketsakidis
—	GK	AUS	Hugo Stolfa
—	GK	AUS	Joseph Di Pietro
—	GK	AUS	Robert Revere
—	DF	AUS	Adam Garganis
—	DF	AUS	Cristian Lucci
—	DF	AUS	David Garofalo
—	DF	AUS	Ethan D'Amico
—	DF	AUS	Gianluca Righele
—	DF	AUS	Giuliano Follachio
—	DF	AUS	Harry Ketsakidis
—	DF	AUS	James Wark
—	DF	AUS	Julian Cococcia
—	DF	AUS	Luca Greco
—	DF	AUS	Lucas Mucciante
—	DF	AUS	Lukas Ramzy
—	DF	AUS	Marc Tallarida
—	DF	AUS	Marco Cantarella
—	DF	AUS	Marco Stella
—	DF	AUS	Matthew Pignata
—	DF	AUS	Matthew Saitlik
—	DF	AUS	Michael Di Giantomasso
—	DF	AUS	Mikhail Capodistrias
—	DF	AUS	Oscar Ablinger
—	DF	AUS	Patrick Heagney
—	MF	AUS	Connor Galvin

No.	Pos.	Nation	Player
—	MF	AUS	Daithi Jack McCaffrey
—	MF	AUS	Daniel Di Giantomasso
—	MF	AUS	Dylan Jacob
—	MF	AUS	George La Rosa
—	MF	AUS	Gianluca Fonzi
—	MF	AUS	Jacob Arfi
—	MF	AUS	Jeremy Ryan
—	MF	SUI	Joel Prelle
—	MF	AUS	Lirak Ejupi
—	MF	AUS	Massimo Costanzo
—	MF	AUS	Matthew Giust (Captain)
—	MF	AUS	Nicholas Giardina
—	MF	AUS	Peter De Luca
—	MF	ENG	Richard Fryer
—	MF	PAK	Sohaib Muhammad Ali
—	MF	VIE	Thuc Huynh
—	MF	AUS	Xavier Mensink
—	FW	AUS	Adrian Chiodo
—	FW	AUS	Atillio Costanzo
—	FW	AUS	Christian Secatore
—	FW	AUS	Daniel Amicucci
—	FW	AUS	Daniele Di Cosmo
—	FW	AUS	Dean Di Pietro
—	MF	AUS	Michael Pontikis
—	FW	AUS	Max Pignata
—	FW	AUS	Simon Ventoruzzo

== Season-by-season record ==
=== Senior Men's ===
Season	League	Tier	Teams	Position	Dockerty Cup	Australia Cup
2002	ASFV 2	NA	10	1	DNC	NC
2003	PL 3 South-East	7	11	7	DNQ	NC
2004	PL 3 South-East	7	11	2	DNQ	NC
2005	PL 2 South-East	6	12	9	NC	NC
2006	PL 2 South-East	6	12	10	NC	NC
2007–2010 OXSC competed in various Victorian amateur competitions with no details available
2011	Men's Thirds 1	9	NA	3	NA	NC
2012	Men's Thirds 1	9	10	1	Round 1	NC
2013	VSL 5 East	7	15	8	Round 2	NC
2014	VSL 5 East	7	11	2	Round 1	
2015	VSL 4 East	6	12	6	Round 1	
2016	VSL 4 East	6	12	8	Round 1	
2017	VSL 4 East	6	11	3	Round 3	
2018	VSL 4 East	6	12	6	Round 2	
2019	VSL 4 North	6	12	8	Round 2	
2020	VSL 4 North	7	12	DNC (season cancelled)	Round 1	
2021	VSL 4 North	7	12	11 (season abandoned)	Round 1	
2022	VSL 4 East	7	12	11	DNC	
2023	ML 4 North-West	12	10	8	DNC	
2024	ML 3 South-East	11	9	2	DNC	
2025	ML 2 South-East	10	10	4	DNC	
2026	ML 2 North-West	12	7	1	DNC	

=== Senior Women's ===
Season	League	Tier	Teams	Position	Cup
2012	Metro North-East	5	10	6	Round 1
2013	VWSL 3 East	4	10	2	DNC
2014	VWSL 3 East	4	10	3	DNC
2015	VWSL 3 East	4	10	1	DNC
2016	VWSL 2 South-East	3	9	7	Round 2
2017	VWSL 2 South-East	3	10	2	Round 2
2018	VWSL 1 North-West	2	9	5	Round 2
2019	VWSL 1 North-West	2	9	5	Round 3
2020	VWSL 1 North-West	3	NA	DNC (season cancelled)	DNC
2021	VWSL 2 South-East	4	10	2 (season abandoned)	Round 3

Key

- DNC = Did not compete
- DNQ = Did not qualify
- ML = Metropolitan League
- NA = Competition details unavailable
- NC = Competition not contested
- PL = Provisional League
- VSL = Victorian State League
- VSLW = Victorian State League Women

== Honours ==
Honours	Number	Years
Victorian State Leagues
Men's Sixth Reserve Tier Premiers	1	2015 (East)
Men's Seventh Tier Runner's Up	2	2004 (South-East), 2014 (East)
Men's Seventh Reserve Tier Runner's Up	2	2013 (East), 2014 (East)
Women's Third Tier Runner's Up	1	2017 (South-East)
Women's Fourth Tier Play-off Runner's Up	1	2015
Women's Fourth Tier Premiers	1	2015 (East)
Women's Fourth Tier Runner's Up	1	2013 (East)
Women's Fifth Tier Runner's Up	1	2017 (East)
Melbourne Metropolitan Leagues
Men's First Tier Premiers	1	2012
Men's Second Tier Play-off Champions	2	2017, 2026
Men's Second Tier Premiers	2	2017 (North-West), 2026 (North-West)
Men's Third Tier Play-off Runner's Up	1	2016
Men's Third Tier Premiers	2	2013 (North-West), 2016 (North-West)
Men's Third Tier Runner's Up	1	2014 (North-West)
Men's Fourth Tier Play-off Champions	1	2026 (South-East)
Men's Fourth Tier Premiers	1	2026 (South-East)
Men's Fourth Tier Runner's Up	1	2017 (North-West)
Men's Fifth Tier Play-off Champions	1	2014
Men's Fifth Tier Premiers	1	2014 (South-East)
Men's Fifth Tier Runner's Up	1	2012 (North-West)
Other
ASFV Challenge Cup Winners	1	2002
ASFV Tier Two Premiers	1	2002
ASFV Unstated Premiers	1	2009
ASFV Unstated Runner's Up	1	2008
ASFV Unstated Premiers	1	2009
ASFV Unstated Runner's Up	1	2008
Marcellin Old Collegians Pre-Season Cup Winners	1	2016

== Notable former players ==
- (Germany) Peter Közle
