= Centro Educativo Recreativo Associação Atlética São Mateus =

São Mateus
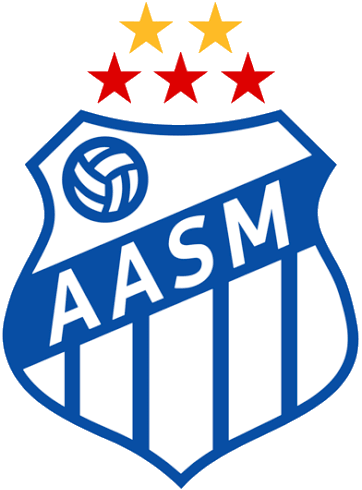
- Full name: Centro Educativo Recreativo Associação Atlética São Mateus
- Nicknames: Alvianil do Sernamby; Gigante do Norte; Azulão; Associação; Sama; Pitbull do Norte
- Founded: December 13, 1963
- Ground: Estádio Sernamby, São Mateus, Espírito Santo state, Brazil
- Capacity: 4,600
- League: Campeonato Brasileiro Série D
- 2011: Série D, 40th
Home colours	Away colours

Centro Educativo Recreativo Associação Atlética São Mateus, commonly known as São Mateus, is a Brazilian football club based in São Mateus, Espírito Santo state. They competed in the Copa do Brasil and in the Série C once.

== History ==
The club was founded on December 13, 1963. São Mateus won the Campeonato Capixaba Second Level in 1987 and in 2008 and the Campeonato Capixaba in 2009. The club competed in the Série C in 1995, when they were eliminated in the First Stage of the competition. They competed in the Copa do Brasil in 2010, when they were eliminated in the first round by Remo. The club won the Campeonato Capixaba again in 2011.

== Honours ==
- Campeonato Capixaba
  - Winners (2): 2009, 2011
  - Runners-up (4): 1994, 1997, 1998, 1999
- Campeonato Capixaba Série B
  - Winners (3): 1987, 2008, 2019
- Torneio Início do Espírito Santo
  - Winners (1): 2003

== Stadium ==
Centro Educativo Recreativo Associação Atlética São Mateus play their home games at Estádio Manoel Moreira Sobrinho, nicknamed Estádio Sernamby. The stadium has a maximum capacity of 4,600 people.
