= Whittlesea Ranges FC =

Whittlesea Ranges
- Full name: Whittlesea Ranges Football Club
- Nicknames: Ranges, the reds
- Founded: 1971
- Ground: Epping Stadium
- Capacity: 10,000
- Chairman: Sam Cuteri
- Coach: Safi Ayoush
- League: Victorian State League 2 North–West
- 2025: 4th of 12
- Website: www.whittlesearanges.com.au
| Home colours | Away colours |

Whittlesea Ranges is a semi-professional soccer club based in the suburbs of Epping and Lalor, Victoria, Australia. All home games are played at Epping Soccer Stadium.

Formed in 1971, the club currently competes in the Victorian State League 2 North-West in the sixth tier of the Australian soccer league system.

== Recent history ==
In 2011, coached by Dean Fak, Whittlesea Ranges were promoted from the State League Division Two North-West, beating Box Hill United and Langwarrin in the play-off fixtures after finishing runners-up to Werribee City in the league.

Ranges appointed Zoran Markovski as the coach for the 2012 State League One season. He was replaced by fellow former Melbourne Knights National Soccer League player Vinko Buljubasic after 13 rounds. Whittlesea were, however, unable to stave off relegation from the State League Division One competition, losing the playoff fixture against Box Hill. Whittlesea finished in 9th place in the 2013 State League Two North-West competition.

In the inaugural season of the National Premier Leagues, Ranges finished in 13th place in the 14-team National Premier Leagues Victoria 2 competition, utilising one of the youngest sides in the league.

The next season, following the addition of another six teams, the competition was split into an East and West conference, each comprising 10 teams. In the new format, Ranges finished in 7th place in NPL2 West.

In 2016, Ranges added former Perth Glory defender Naum Sekulovski to the side. The club finished the season in 4th place, despite striker Atilla Ofli winning the NPL2 West golden boot with 32 goals in 28 games. In 2017, Whittlesea finished the season in 5th place. After the season, head coach Vinko Buljubasic left his position.

For the 2018 NPL2 West season, Whittlesea appointed Gianfranco Impellizeri. Impellizeri had led Dandenong Thunder SC to promotion from NPL2 East in 2017. The club also signed former Socceroo Simon Colosimo. In late May, Impellizeri departed Ranges, with the club sitting in second-bottom place and was replaced by former Sunshine George Cross FC manager Tony Ciantar. Colosimo also departed the club. Ciantar brought with him a change in form a guided Ranges to a sixth-placed finish for 2018.

Ciantar was sacked as the club's senior head coach after eight rounds of the 2019 season, with Ranges sitting in bottom place with 2 points. George Karkaletsis was named as Whittlesea's new manager. Despite overseeing a significant turnaround in the second half of the season, Karkaletsis' Ranges were unable to avoid finishing in 8th place.

Alfredo Costantino was appointed as Head Coach in the 2021 Season to replace Karkaletsis, with the team sitting last on the ladder. The season got cancelled because of Covid.

Alfredo started as Senior Coach for the 2022 Season; however, he left Ranges with one win (13 lost one draw, and one win through the season

The Club took direction to appoint Technical Director/U21 Head Coach, Safi ayoush for the remainder of the 2022 Season, but despite all efforts, the team gained 3 points with 6 rounds left under his guidance, with better performance

Safi Ayoush's role at Whittlesea Ranges Football Club has varied over the years, for 5 years he was in Senior Structure as Head Coach and Assistant Coach, but most recently he has overseen several players in his role as the club's Football Director, Technical Director and also led Whittlesea Ranges Football Club U21 squad as recently as 2022, where he then took a caretaker role as Senior Mens Head Coach towards the end of season 2022.

Safi Ayoush was permanently made Senior Men's Head Coach of Whittlesea Ranges Football Club.
