= Gálatas Esporte Clube =

Gálatas
- Full name: Gálatas Esporte Clube
- Nickname: Leão Capixaba
- Founded: August 6, 2006 (19 years ago)
- Ground: Estádio Kléber Andrade, Cariacica
- Capacity: 22.000
- President: Enrico Ambrogini
- Head Coach: Cleiton Marcelino
- League: Campeonato Capixaba Série B
- 2025: Capixaba Série B, 5th of 8
- Website: www.esfc.com.br
Home colors	Away colors	Third colors

Gálatas Esporte Clube, formerly Espírito Santo Futebol Clube, is a Brazilian football club based in Espírito Santo state.

They club is currently ranked sixth among Espírito Santo teams in CBF's national club ranking, at 184th place overall.

== History ==
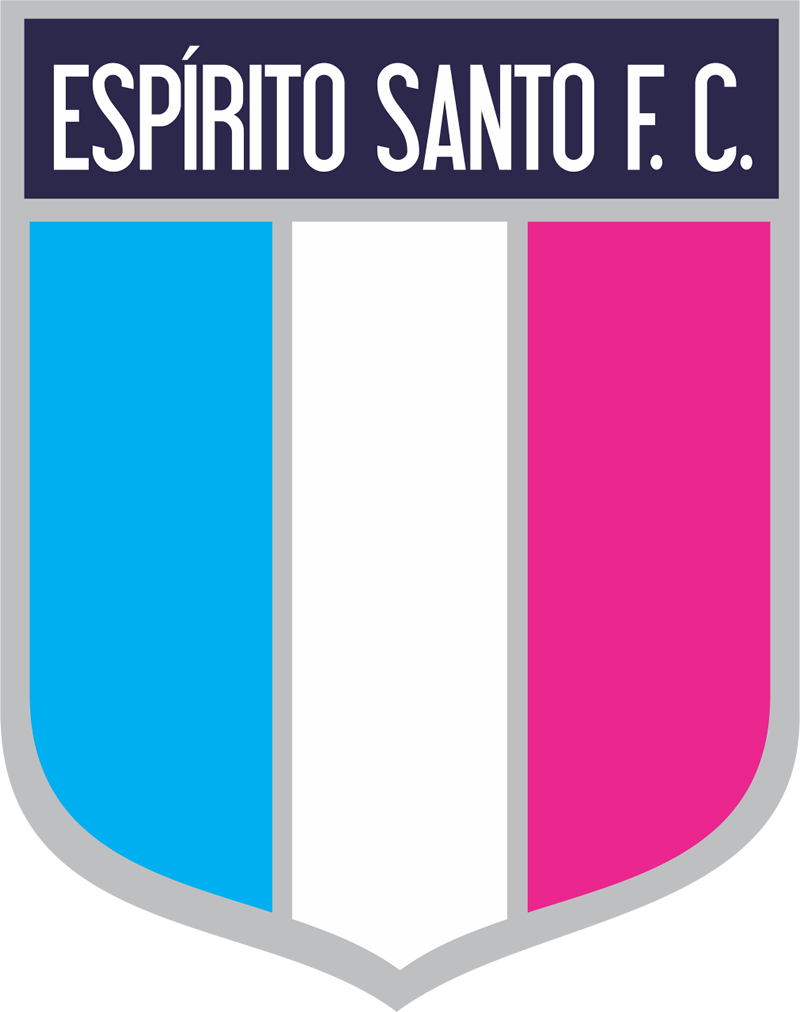
Espírito Santo FC badge

The club was founded on October 19, 2007. They finished in the second position in the Campeonato Capixaba Second Level in 2009, losing the competition to Vitória.

== Honours ==
- Copa ES
  - Winners (1): 2015
- Campeonato Capixaba Série B
  - Winners (1): 2015
