= Esporte Clube Aracruz =

Association football club in Brazil

Aracruz
- Full name: Esporte Clube Aracruz
- Nickname(s): Dragão Vermelho
- Founded: June 12, 1954; 71 years ago
- Ground: Estádio Eugênio Antônio Bitti, Aracruz, Espírito Santo state, Brazil
- Capacity: 5,000
| Home colors | Away colors | Third colors |

Esporte Clube Aracruz, commonly known as Aracruz, is a Brazilian football club based in Aracruz, Espírito Santo state. The club was formerly known as Esporte Clube Sauassu. They won the Campeonato Capixaba once.

== History ==
The club was founded on June 12, 1954, as Esporte Clube Sauassu. They won the Campeonato Capixaba Second Level in 1990 and in 2010. Aracruz won the Campeonato Capixaba in 2012, after beating Conilon in the final.

== Honours ==
- Campeonato Capixaba
  - Winners (1): 2012
  - Runners-up (1): 1993
- Copa dos Campeões do Espírito Santo
  - Winners (1): 2013
- Campeonato Capixaba Second Level
  - Winners (2): 1990, 2010

== Stadium ==
Esporte Clube Aracruz play their home games at Estádio Eugênio Antônio Bitti. The stadium has a maximum capacity of 5,000 people.
