= Conilon Futebol Clube de Jaguaré =

Brazilian football club

Conilon
- Full name: Conilon Futebol Clube de Jaguaré
- Founded: 29 Juny, 1958
- Ground: Estádio do Conilon, Jaguaré, Espírito Santo state, Brazil
- Capacity: 4,000
| Home colors | Away colors |

Conilon Futebol Clube de Jaguaré, commonly known as Conilon, is a Brazilian football club based in Jaguaré, Espírito Santo state. The club was formerly known as Botafogo Futebol Clube de Jaguaré.

== History ==
The club was founded in 2011, as Botafogo Futebol Clube de Jaguaré, adopting similar colors, logo and kits as Rio de Janeiro-based club Botafogo de Futebol e Regatas. Botafogo de Jaguaré won the Campeonato Capixaba Second Level in 2011, after defeating Real Noroeste in the final. The first leg, played on June 4, in Águia Branca, ended in a 1–1 draw, and in the second leg, in Jaguaré, played on June 11, they beat the opponent 5–0. The club was renamed to Conilon Futebol Clube de Jaguaré in late November.

== Achievements ==
- Campeonato Capixaba Série B:
  - Winners (1): 2011

== Stadium ==
Conilon Futebol Clube de Jaguaré play their home games at Centro Esportivo Conilon. also known as Estádio Municipal de Jaguaré and as Estádio do Conilon. The stadium has a maximum capacity of 5,000 people.
