= Jaguaré =

Municipality of Espírito Santo, Brazil

- Municipality of Espírito Santo, Brazil
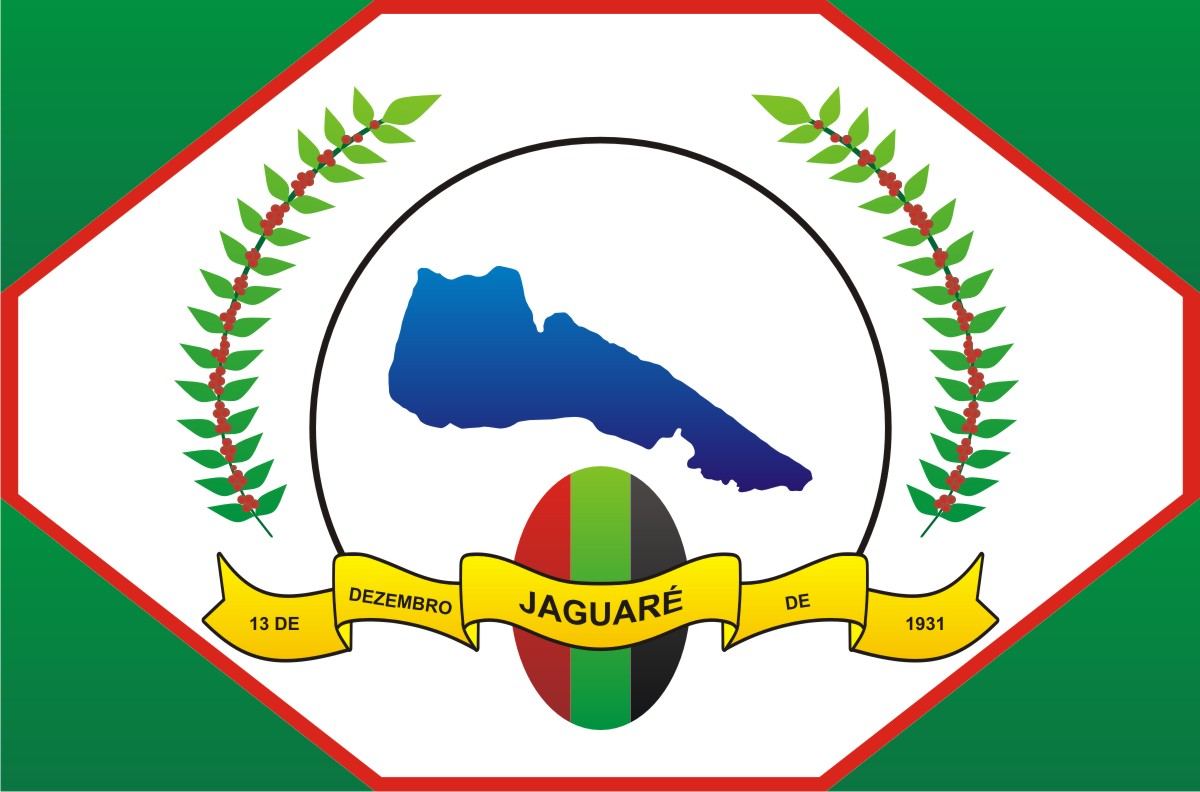
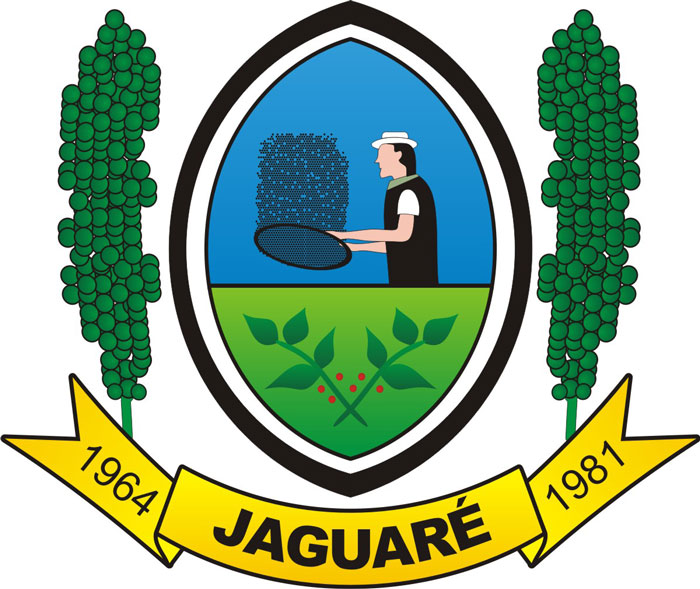
- Flag Coat of arms
- Etymology: Named after a type of grass that was abundant in the area
- Location of Jaguaré in Espírito Santo

- Location within Brazil Location within South America
- Coordinates: 18°54′21″S 40°4′33″W
- Country: Brazil
- Region: Southeast
- State: Espírito Santo
- Founded: 31 January 1983

Government
  - Mayor: Marcos Antonio Guerra Wandermurem (UNIÃO) (2025-2028)
  - Vice Mayor: Elder Sossai de Lima (UNIÃO) (2025-2028)

Area
  - Total: 659.751 km^{2} (254.731 sq mi)
- Elevation: 70 m (230 ft)

Population (2022)
  - Total: 28,931
  - Density: 43.85/km^{2} (113.6/sq mi)
- Demonym: Jaguarense (Brazilian Portuguese)
- Time zone: UTC-03:00 (Brasília Time)
- Postal code: 29950-000, 29954-000, 29957-000
- HDI (2010): 0.678 – medium
- Website: jaguare.es.gov.br

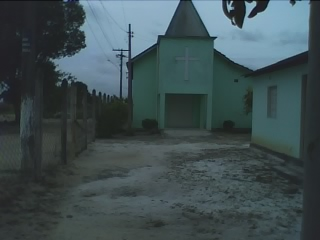

Jaguaré is a municipality located in the Brazilian state of Espírito Santo. Its population was 31,039 (2020) and its area is 660 km^{2}.

The municipality contains part of the 27,858 hectares (68,840 acres) Sooretama Biological Reserve, a strictly protected conservation unit created in 1982 when two earlier units were merged.

== See also ==
- List of municipalities in Espírito Santo
