= 2004 Campeonato Mineiro =

Campeonato Mineiro de Futebol do Módulo I
- Season: 2004
- Champions: Cruzeiro (31st title)
- Relegated: Social; Uberaba; Tupi; Rio Branco
- 2005 CB: América; Caldense
- 2004 Série C: Villa Nova; Ipatinga; Tupi
- Matches: 97
- Goals: 295 (3.04 per match)
- Top goalscorer: Alex (Cruzeiro) - 14 goals
- Biggest home win: Cruzeiro 5-0 Rio Branco (February 14, 2004)
- Biggest away win: Mamoré 1-7 Cruzeiro (February 21, 2004)
- Highest scoring: Mamoré 1-7 Cruzeiro (February 21, 2004); Atlético 5-3 Cruzeiro (February 29, 2004)

The 2004 Campeonato Mineiro de Futebol do Módulo I was the 90th season of Minas Gerais's top-flight professional football league. The season began on January 21 and ended on April 18. Cruzeiro won the title for the 31st time.

== Participating teams ==
Locations of the 2004 Módulo I teams

Club	Home city	Previous season
América	Belo Horizonte	3rd
Atlético	Belo Horizonte	2nd
Caldense	Poços de Caldas	8th
Cruzeiro	Belo Horizonte	1st
Guarani	Divinópolis	10th
Ipatinga	Ipatinga	6th
Mamoré	Patos de Minas	12th
Rio Branco	Andradas	7th
Social	Coronel Fabriciano	9th
Tupi	Juíz de Fora	4th
Uberaba	Uberaba	1st (Second level)
URT	Patos de Minas	11th
Valeriodoce	Itabira	2nd (Second level)
Villa Nova	Nova Lima	5th

== League table ==
Pos	Team	Pld	W	D	L	GF	GA	GD	Pts	Qualification or relegation
1	Atlético	13	8	4	1	28	13	+15	28	Qualified to the Semifinals
2	América	13	8	3	2	27	14	+13	27	Qualified to the Semifinals
3	Cruzeiro	13	8	2	3	35	13	+22	26	Qualified to the Semifinals
4	Caldense	13	7	1	5	18	17	+1	22	Qualified to the Semifinals
5	Villa Nova	13	6	4	3	22	17	+5	22	
6	Guarani	13	6	4	3	18	17	+1	22	
7	Ipatinga	13	4	3	6	19	19	0	15	
8	URT	13	4	3	6	14	18	−4	15	
9	Valeriodoce	13	3	5	5	13	18	−5	14	
10	Mamoré	13	4	1	8	16	34	−18	13	
11	Social	13	3	4	6	16	21	−5	13	Relegated
12	Uberaba	13	3	4	6	18	22	−4	13	Relegated
13	Tupi	13	3	2	8	16	22	−6	11	Relegated
14	Rio Branco	13	3	2	8	13	28	−15	11	Relegated

Updated to match(es) played on March 28, 2004. Source: RSSSF.com
Rules for classification: 1) points; 2) wins; 3) goal difference; 4) number of goals scored.

=== Final Tournament ===
Semi-finals
4th	Caldense	1	0	1
1st	Atlético	3	3	6
3rd	Cruzeiro	2	4	6
2nd	América	1	1	2

Finals
1st	Atlético	1	1	2
3rd	Cruzeiro	3	0	3

== Finals ==
=== First leg ===
2004-04-11
16:00 (UTC-3)

Cruzeiro	3 – 1	Atlético
Alex 9'; Jussiê 12' 26'	(Report) (pt)	Alex Mineiro 7'

Mineirão, Belo Horizonte
Attendance: 38,350
Referee: Cléver Assunção Gonçalves

=== Second leg ===
2004-04-18
16:00 (UTC-3)

Atlético	1 – 0	Cruzeiro
Alex Mineiro 69'	(Report) (pt)

Mineirão, Belo Horizonte
Attendance: 45,212
Referee: Alício Pena Júnior

Campeonato Mineiro
2004 champion

31th title
