= 2003 Campeonato Mineiro =

Campeonato Mineiro de Futebol do Módulo I
- Season: 2003
- Champions: Cruzeiro (30th title)
- Relegated: Nacional
- 2004 CB: América; Tupi
- 2003 Série C: Villa Nova; Ipatinga; Tupi; Rio Branco
- Matches: 78
- Goals: 252 (3.23 per match)
- Top goalscorer: Guilherme (Atlético) - 13 goals
- Biggest home win: Cruzeiro 6-0 Mamoré (February 26, 2003)
- Biggest away win: Social 1-5 Atlético (March 9, 2003); URT 0-4 Cruzeiro (March 16, 2003)
- Highest scoring: Caldense 3-4 Rio Branco (January 26, 2003); América 6-1 URT (February 23, 2003)

The 2003 Campeonato Mineiro de Futebol do Módulo I was the 89th season of Minas Gerais's top-flight professional football league. The season began on January 26 and ended on March 30. Cruzeiro won the title for the 30th time.

== Participating teams ==
Locations of the 2003 Módulo I teams

Club	Home city	Previous season
América	Belo Horizonte	3rd
Atlético	Belo Horizonte	4th
Caldense	Poços de Caldas	2nd
Cruzeiro	Belo Horizonte	1st
Guarani	Divinópolis	1st (Second level)
Ipatinga	Ipatinga	6th
Mamoré	Patos de Minas	5th
Nacional	Uberaba	11th
Rio Branco	Andradas	9th
Social	Coronel Fabriciano	2nd (Second level)
Tupi	Juíz de Fora	8th
URT	Patos de Minas	10th
Villa Nova	Nova Lima	7th

== League table ==
Pos	Team	Pld	W	D	L	GF	GA	GD	Pts	Qualification or relegation
1	Cruzeiro	12	10	2	0	35	7	+28	32	Champions
2	Atlético	12	7	4	1	27	15	+12	25	
3	América	12	7	2	3	23	13	+10	23	
4	Tupi	12	5	5	2	21	17	+4	20	Qualified to 2003 Série C
5	Villa Nova	12	5	2	5	17	20	−3	17	Qualified to 2003 Série C
6	Ipatinga	12	4	5	3	23	18	+5	17	Qualified to 2003 Série C
7	Rio Branco	12	3	6	3	22	22	0	15	Qualified to 2003 Série C
8	Caldense	12	3	5	4	17	19	−2	14	
9	Social	12	3	5	4	16	23	−7	14	
10	Guarani	12	1	6	5	12	21	−9	9	
11	URT	12	1	6	5	16	28	−12	9	
12	Mamoré	12	2	1	9	9	26	−17	7	
13	Nacional	12	1	3	8	14	23	−9	6	Relegated

Updated to match(es) played on March 30, 2003. Source: RSSSF.com
Rules for classification: 1) points; 2) wins; 3) goal difference; 4) number of goals scored.

Campeonato Mineiro
2003 champion

30th title
