= Wagner Oliveira =

Brazilian footballer

Wagner
Personal information
- Full name: Wagner Oliveira
- Date of birth: 21 August 1959 (age 67)
- Place of birth: Inhapim, Brazil
- Position: Forward

Youth career
- Faixa Azul (Inhapim)

Senior career*
Years	Team	Apps	(Gls)
1979–1981	América-MG		
1982–1984	Bangu		
1983	→ Joinville (loan)		
1984	Fortaleza		
1984	America-RJ		
1985–1986	Joinville		
1986–1987	Guarani		

Managerial career
- 1992–1993: Santa Tereza
- 1994: Araxá
- 1995: Uberlândia
- 1997: Montes Claros
- 1998: Joinville
- 1999: Social
- 2000: Atlético Goianiense
- 2001: Joinville
- 2002: Uberlândia
- 2002: Villa Nova
- 2003: América-MG
- 2003: América-RN
- 2003–2004: Uberlândia
- 2005: Villa Nova
- 2005: Mamoré
- 2005: Estrela do Norte
- 2006: Villa Nova
- 2006: Joinville
- 2007: Joinville
- 2007–2008: Uberlândia
- 2009: Villa Nova
- 2010: Atlético de Ibirama
- 2010–2011: Funorte
- 2012: Estrela do Norte
- 2014: Real Noroeste
- 2014: Estrela do Norte
- 2015: Real Noroeste
- 2016: Linhares
- 2019: Iraty
- * Club domestic league appearances and goals

Wagner Oliveira (born 21 August 1959) is a Brazilian former professional footballer and manager who played as a forward.

== Playing career ==
Nicknamed the "Man of Steel" (Portuguese: Homem de Aço) because he was originally from the Vale do Aço region in Minas Gerais, Wagner was the highlight of América Mineiro and the state's top scorer in 1981. Wagnrt later played for Bangu, Joinville and Fortaleza, becoming state champion. He ended his career at Guarani, after the final of the 1987 Campeonato Brasileiro Série A.

== Managerial career ==
As a coach, Wagner Oliveira managed clubs in different regions of Brazil, with notable spells at Uberlândia, Joinville América Mineiro, América de Natal, Estrela do Norte and Real Noroeste. His last club was Iraty SC in 2019.

== Honours ==
=== Player ===
Joinville

- Campeonato Catarinense: 1983

Individual

- 1981 Campeonato Mineiro top scorer: 16 goals

=== Manager ===
Uberlândia

- Taça Minas Gerais: 2003

Joinville

- Campeonato Catarinense Série B: 2006

Estrela do Norte

- Campeonato Capixaba: 2014

Real Noroeste

- Copa ES: 2015
