= 1988 Campeonato Brasileiro Série C =

Campeonato Brasileiro Série C
- Season: 1988
- Champions: União São João
- Promoted: none
- Matches: 172
- Goals: 414 (2.41 per match)
- Top goalscorer: Kel (União São João), 9 goals
- Biggest home win: Campinense 5–1 ABC (30 November)
- Biggest away win: Guarany de Cruz Alta 1–5 Iguaçu (23 October)
- Highest scoring: Tupi 3–3 Porto Alegre-RJ (23 October); Guarany de Cruz Alta 1–5 Iguaçu (23 October); Sergipe 3–3 Confiança (9 November); Campinense 5–1 ABC (30 November)

The Campeonato Brasileiro Série C 1988, known as the Divisão de Acesso, was a football series played from 22 October to 18 December 1988. It was the third level of the Brazilian National League. The competition had 43 clubs, and two of them were originally promoted to Série B.

In 1989, the Brazilian Football Confederation declared that the 1988 Série C was a deficitary tournament, deciding to extinguish it and allowing 96 teams in the 1989 Campeonato Brasileiro Série B.

== First phase ==
=== Group 1 ===
Pos	Team	Pld	W	PKW	PKL	L	GF	GA	GD	Pts	Qualification	ABC	CAM	FER	AME
1	(Rio Grande do Norte) ABC	6	5	0	0	1	9	5	+4	15	Advance to Second phase		2–0	3–1	2–1
2	(Paraíba) Campinense	6	3	0	1	2	7	5	+2	10	Advance to Second phase	3–0		1–0	1–1 (4–5 pen.)
3	(Ceará) Ferroviário	6	2	0	0	4	6	9	−3	6		0–1	0–1		2–1
4	(Rio Grande do Norte) América	6	1	1	0	4	7	10	−3	5		0–1	2–1	2–3	

=== Group 2 ===
Pos	Team	Pld	W	PKW	PKL	L	GF	GA	GD	Pts	Qualification	BOT	PAU	AUT	ALE
1	(Paraíba) Botafogo	6	4	1	1	0	10	4	+6	15	Advance to Second phase		0–1	2–1	1–1 (4–3 pen.)
2	(Pernambuco) Paulistano	6	2	1	0	3	5	5	0	8	Advance to Second phase	0–1		0–1	0–0 (4–3 pen.)
3	(Paraíba) Auto Esporte	6	2	1	0	3	5	9	−4	8		1–3	1–4		1–0
4	(Rio Grande do Norte) Alecrim	6	0	1	3	2	2	4	−2	5		1–1 (4–3 pen.)	0–1	0–0 (5–6 pen.)	

=== Group 3 ===
Pos	Team	Pld	W	PKW	PKL	L	GF	GA	GD	Pts	Qualification	CON	SER	CAP	COM
1	(Sergipe) Confiança	4	1	2	1	0	5	4	+1	8	Advance to Second phase		1–1 (4–3 pen.)	1–0	–
2	Sergipe	4	1	1	1	1	7	5	+2	6	Advance to Second phase	3–3 (3–2 pen.)		3–0	–
3	(Alagoas) Capelense	4	1	0	1	2	1	4	−3	4		0–0 (3–5 pen.)	1–0		–
4	(Alagoas) Comercial	0	0	0	0	0	0	0	0	0		–	–	–	

- Comercial withdrew from the tournament.

=== Group 4 ===
Pos	Team	Pld	W	PKW	PKL	L	GF	GA	GD	Pts	Qualification	LAG	ATL	SER
1	(Sergipe) Lagarto	2	1	1	0	0	2	1	+1	5	Advance to Second phase		1–1 (4–3 pen.)	–
2	(Bahia) Atlético Alagoinhas	2	0	0	1	1	1	2	−1	1	Advance to Second phase	0–1		–
3	(Bahia) Serrano	0	0	0	0	0	0	0	0	0		–	–	

- Serrano withdrew from the tournament.

=== Group 5 ===
Pos	Team	Pld	W	PKW	PKL	L	GF	GA	GD	Pts	Qualification	TIR	ANA	TAG	MIX
1	(Federal District (Brazil)) Tiradentes	6	4	1	1	0	10	4	+6	15	Advance to Second phase		1–1 (2–4 pen.)	2–1	2–0
2	(Goiás) Anápolis	6	1	2	2	1	6	6	0	9	Advance to Second phase	1–3		0–0 (4–5 pen.)	1–1 (6–5 pen.)
3	(Federal District (Brazil)) Taguatinga	6	1	1	1	3	3	5	−2	6		0–0 (3–4 pen.)	0–2		2–0
4	(Mato Grosso) Mixto	6	1	1	1	3	4	8	−4	6		1–2	1–1 (4–2 pen.)	1–0	

=== Group 6 ===
Pos	Team	Pld	W	PKW	PKL	L	GF	GA	GD	Pts	Qualification	COM	NOV	DOU	AME
1	(Mato Grosso do Sul) Comercial	4	1	2	1	0	3	1	+2	8	Advance to Second phase		0–0 (4–3 pen.)	0–0 (7–6 pen.)	–
2	(São Paulo (state)) Novorizontino	4	1	1	1	1	3	1	+2	6	Advance to Second phase	0–0 (3–1 pen.)		2–0	–
3	(Mato Grosso do Sul) Douradense	4	1	0	1	2	3	6	−3	4		1–3	2–1		–
4	(São Paulo (state)) América	0	0	0	0	0	0	0	0	0		–	–	–	

- América withdrew from the tournament.

=== Group 7 ===
Pos	Team	Pld	W	PKW	PKL	L	GF	GA	GD	Pts	Qualification	FER	UBI	XVJ
1	(São Paulo (state)) Ferroviária	4	2	1	0	1	4	3	+1	8	Advance to Second phase		1–0	3–2
2	(Mato Grosso do Sul) Ubiratan	4	1	1	1	1	3	3	0	6	Advance to Second phase	1–0		2–2 (0–3 pen.)
3	(São Paulo (state)) XV de Jaú	4	0	1	2	1	4	5	−1	4		0–0 (4–5 pen.)	0–0 (3–4 pen.)	

=== Group 8 ===
Pos	Team	Pld	W	PKW	PKL	L	GF	GA	GD	Pts	Qualification	POR	DES	TUP	CAB
1	(Rio de Janeiro (state)) Porto Alegre	6	1	4	1	0	7	6	+1	12	Advance to Second phase		1–0	0–0 (6–5 pen.)	0–0 (3–4 pen.)
2	(Espírito Santo) Desportiva	6	2	1	2	1	10	7	+3	10	Advance to Second phase	2–2 (2–3 pen.)		1–1 (6–7 pen.)	1–1 (3–2 pen.)
3	(Minas Gerais) Tupi	6	1	2	2	1	7	9	−2	9		3–3 (4–5 pen.)	1–4		2–1
4	(Rio de Janeiro (state)) Cabofriense	6	0	1	3	2	4	6	−2	5		1–1 (1–3 pen.)	1–2	0–0 (2–4 pen.)	

=== Group 9 ===
Pos	Team	Pld	W	PKW	PKL	L	GF	GA	GD	Pts	Qualification	USJ	ESP	FAB	MOG
1	(São Paulo (state)) União São João	6	4	0	1	1	7	2	+5	13	Advance to Second phase		1–0	2–0	3–1
2	(Minas Gerais) Esportivo	6	2	1	1	2	3	3	0	9	Advance to Second phase	0–1		1–0	1–0
3	(Minas Gerais) Fabril	6	2	0	1	3	5	7	−2	7		1–0	1–1 (5–6 pen.)		2–1
4	(São Paulo (state)) Mogi Mirim	6	1	2	0	3	4	7	−3	7		0–0 (5–4 pen.)	0–0 (4–3 pen.)	2–1	

=== Group 10 ===
Pos	Team	Pld	W	PKW	PKL	L	GF	GA	GD	Pts	Qualification	VRE	STA	XVP	COL
1	(Rio de Janeiro (state)) Volta Redonda	6	2	3	1	0	6	4	+2	13	Advance to Second phase		1–0	1–1 (4–1 pen.)	1–1 (4–2 pen.)
2	(São Paulo (state)) Santo André	6	3	1	1	1	6	2	+4	12	Advance to Second phase	0–0 (5–6 pen.)		0–0 (8–7 pen.)	4–1
3	(São Paulo (state)) XV de Piracicaba	6	1	1	3	1	5	4	+1	8		1–1 (4–3 pen.)	0–1		2–0
4	(Paraná (state)) Colorado	6	0	1	1	4	4	11	−7	3		1–2	0–1	1–1 (3–0 pen.)	

=== Group 11 ===
Pos	Team	Pld	W	PKW	PKL	L	GF	GA	GD	Pts	Qualification	FIG	BRU	ESP	INT
1	(Santa Catarina (state)) Figueirense	6	3	1	0	2	8	6	+2	11	Advance to Second phase		1–1 (3–2 pen.)	3–0	2–0
2	(Santa Catarina (state)) Brusque	6	2	2	1	1	4	2	+2	11	Advance to Second phase	0–1		2–0	1–0
3	(Rio Grande do Sul) Esportivo	6	2	0	2	2	6	8	−2	8		3–1	0–0 (3–5 pen.)		2–2 (6–7 pen.)
4	(Rio Grande do Sul) Inter de Santa Maria	6	1	1	1	3	4	6	−2	6		2–0	0–0 (4–5 pen.)	0–1	

=== Group 12 ===
Pos	Team	Pld	W	PKW	PKL	L	GF	GA	GD	Pts	Qualification	MAR	BLU	IGU	GUA
1	(Santa Catarina (state)) Marcílio Dias	6	4	1	0	1	7	4	+3	14	Advance to Second phase		1–1 (4–3 pen.)	2–0	1–0
2	(Santa Catarina (state)) Blumenau	6	4	0	1	1	11	5	+6	13	Advance to Second phase	3–1		2–0	2–0
3	(Paraná (state)) Iguaçu	6	2	1	0	3	8	8	0	8		0–1	1–0		2–2 (5–4 pen.)
4	(Rio Grande do Sul) Guarany	6	0	0	1	5	5	14	−9	1		0–1	2–3	1–5	

== Second phase ==
=== Group 13 ===
Pos	Team	Pld	W	PKW	PKL	L	GF	GA	GD	Pts	Qualification	BOT	CAM	ABC	PAU
1	(Paraíba) Botafogo	6	4	0	1	1	8	5	+3	13	Advance to Third phase		2–1	1–0	0–2
2	(Paraíba) Campinense	6	3	0	0	3	14	11	+3	9		1–3		5–1	3–2
3	(Rio Grande do Norte) ABC	6	2	1	0	3	5	8	−3	8		1–1 (5–4 pen.)	2–0		1–0
4	(Pernambuco) Paulistano	6	2	0	0	4	6	9	−3	6		0–1	1–4	1–0	

=== Group 14 ===
Pos	Team	Pld	W	PKW	PKL	L	GF	GA	GD	Pts	Qualification	LAG	ATL	SER	CON
1	(Sergipe) Lagarto	6	2	3	0	1	6	5	+1	12	Advance to Third phase		2–2 (6–5 pen.)	1–1 (6–5 pen.)	2–1
2	(Bahia) Atlético Alagoinhas	6	3	0	2	1	6	4	+2	11		0–0 (4–5 pen.)		1–0	2–0
3	Sergipe	6	2	0	2	2	5	4	+1	8		0–1	2–0		1–0
4	(Sergipe) Confiança	6	1	1	0	4	3	7	−4	5		1–0	0–1	1–1 (4–1 pen.)	

=== Group 15 ===
Pos	Team	Pld	W	PKW	PKL	L	GF	GA	GD	Pts	Qualification	TIR	ANA	UBI	COM
1	(Federal District (Brazil)) Tiradentes	6	4	0	0	2	11	7	+4	12	Advance to Third phase		3–2	1–0	1–0
2	(Goiás) Anápolis	6	2	2	0	2	5	5	0	10		1–0		0–0 (4–2 pen.)	0–0 (5–4 pen.)
3	(Mato Grosso do Sul) Ubiratan	6	2	0	2	2	6	6	0	8		3–2	2–1		1–2
4	(Mato Grosso do Sul) Comercial	6	1	1	1	3	3	7	−4	6		1–4	0–1	0–0 (4–1 pen.)	

=== Group 16 ===
Pos	Team	Pld	W	PKW	PKL	L	GF	GA	GD	Pts	Qualification	ESP	VRE	POR	DES
1	(Minas Gerais) Esportivo	6	3	0	3	0	9	3	+6	12	Advance to Third phase	—	1–0	3–0	0–0 (8–9 pen.)
2	(Rio de Janeiro (state)) Volta Redonda	6	2	1	1	2	6	7	−1	9		1–1 (10–9 pen.)	—	1–0	3–0
3	(Rio de Janeiro (state)) Porto Alegre	6	2	1	0	3	6	7	−1	8		1–1 (4–3 pen.)	4–0	—	0–2
4	(Espírito Santo) Desportiva	6	1	2	0	3	4	8	−4	7		1–3	1–1 (4–2 pen.)	0–1	—

=== Group 17 ===
Pos	Team	Pld	W	PKW	PKL	L	GF	GA	GD	Pts	Qualification	USJ	STA	BLU	BRU
1	(São Paulo (state)) União São João	6	3	1	0	2	8	5	+3	11	Advance to Third phase		1–0	1–2	4–0
2	(São Paulo (state)) Santo André	6	3	0	2	1	8	5	+3	11		1–1 (1–2 pen.)		2–1	3–1
3	(Santa Catarina (state)) Blumenau	6	1	3	0	2	5	6	−1	9		0–1	1–1 (9–8 pen.)		1–1 (4–3 pen.)
4	(Santa Catarina (state)) Brusque	6	1	0	2	3	4	9	−5	5		2–0	0–1	0–0 (6–7 pen.)	

=== Group 18 ===
Pos	Team	Pld	W	PKW	PKL	L	GF	GA	GD	Pts	Qualification	MAR	FER	NOV	FIG
1	(Santa Catarina (state)) Marcílio Dias	6	3	1	1	1	8	6	+2	12	Advance to Third phase		2–0	3–1	1–1 (4–3 pen.)
2	(São Paulo (state)) Ferroviária	6	2	1	1	2	5	4	+1	9		1–1 (4–2 pen.)		2–0	2–0
3	(São Paulo (state)) Novorizontino	6	2	1	0	3	8	6	+2	8		3–0	0–0 (4–3 pen.)		1–0
4	(Santa Catarina (state)) Figueirense	6	2	0	1	3	3	5	−2	7		0–1	1–0	1–0	

== Third phase ==
=== Group 19 ===
Pos	Team	Pld	W	PKW	PKL	L	GF	GA	GD	Pts	Qualification	ESP	BOT	LAG
1	(Minas Gerais) Esportivo	4	2	1	0	1	9	2	+7	8	Advance to the Finals		4–0	4–0
2	(Paraíba) Botafogo	4	2	0	0	2	5	7	−2	6		2–1		2–0
3	(Sergipe) Lagarto	4	1	0	1	2	2	7	−5	4		0–0 (3–4 pen.)	2–1	

=== Group 20 ===
Pos	Team	Pld	W	PKW	PKL	L	GF	GA	GD	Pts	Qualification	USJ	MAR	TIR
1	(São Paulo (state)) União São João	4	2	0	1	1	5	3	+2	7	Advance to the Finals		1–0	3–1
2	(Santa Catarina (state)) Marcílio Dias	4	2	0	0	2	4	4	0	6		2–1		2–1
3	(Federal District (Brazil)) Tiradentes	4	1	1	0	2	3	5	−2	5		0–0 (6–5 pen.)	1–0	

== Final ==
16 December 1988

Esportivo	1–1	União São João
Telo 77'		24' Kel

Estádio Municipal Starling Soares, Passos, Minas Gerais

18 December 1988

União São João	2–2	Esportivo
Kel 14'; Odair 41'		78' Telo; 88' Luís Carlos

Estádio Engenho Grande, Araras, São Paulo

União São João declared as the Campeonato Brasileiro Série C champions after having a better record (bigger number of wins) during the tournament.
