= 1990 Campeonato Brasileiro Série C =

Brazilian Football Competition

Campeonato Brasileiro Série C
- Season: 1990
- Champions: Atlético Goianiense
- Promoted: none
- Matches: 74
- Goals: 142 (1.92 per match)
- Top goalscorer: Júlio César (Atlético Goianiense), 10 goals
- Biggest home win: Atlético Goianiense 5–1 Ubiratan (17 October)

The Campeonato Brasileiro Série C 1990, known as the Terceira Divisão, was a football series played from 29 September to 9 December 2020. It was the third level of the Brazilian National League. The competition had 30 clubs, and four of them were originally promoted to Série B.

In 1991, the Brazilian Football Confederation declared that the 1990 Série C was a deficitary tournament, deciding to extinguish it and allowing 64 teams in the 1991 Campeonato Brasileiro Série B.

== First phase ==
=== Group A ===
Pos	Team	Pld	W	D	L	GF	GA	GD	Pts	Qualification	PAY	FOR	MAR	TIR	NAC
1	(Pará) Paysandu	4	3	1	0	5	1	+4	7	Advance to Second phase			1–0		2–0
2	(Ceará) Fortaleza	4	2	2	0	5	2	+3	6	Advance to Second phase	0–0			2–0	
3	Maranhão	4	1	2	1	5	3	+2	4			1–1		1–1	
4	(Piauí) Tiradentes	4	1	1	2	4	6	−2	3		1–2				2–1
5	(Amazonas (Brazilian state)) Nacional	4	0	0	4	2	9	−7	0			1–2	0–3		

=== Group B ===
Pos	Team	Pld	W	D	L	GF	GA	GD	Pts	Qualification	ARN	EST	CSA	APE	CAM
1	(Rio Grande do Norte) América-RN	4	3	1	0	7	3	+4	7	Advance to Second phase		1–0		1–0	
2	(Pernambuco) Estudantes	4	2	1	1	4	3	+1	5				1–2		2–1
3	(Alagoas) CSA	4	1	2	1	4	4	0	4		2–2	1–2			
4	(Pernambuco) América-PE	4	0	2	2	0	2	−2	2				0–0		0–0
5	(Paraíba) Campinense	4	0	2	2	2	5	−3	2		1–3		0–1		

=== Group C ===
Pos	Team	Pld	W	D	L	GF	GA	GD	Pts	Qualification	AMG	COL	ARJ	FLU	LAG
1	(Minas Gerais) América-MG	4	2	2	0	3	0	+3	6	Advance to Second phase			2–0	1–0	
2	(Espírito Santo) Colatina	4	1	3	0	4	2	+2	5		0–0		3–1		
3	(Rio de Janeiro (state)) America-RJ	4	2	0	2	4	5	−1	4					1–0	2–0
4	(Bahia) Fluminense de Feira	4	1	1	2	3	4	−1	3			1–1			2–1
5	(Sergipe) Lagarto	4	0	2	2	1	4	−3	2		0–0	0–0			

=== Group D ===
Pos	Team	Pld	W	D	L	GF	GA	GD	Pts	Qualification	ATL	GAM	VIL	UNI	UBI
1	(Goiás) Atlético Goianiense	4	4	0	0	12	3	+9	8	Advance to Second phase		1–0			5–1
2	(Federal District (Brazil)) Gama	4	3	0	1	3	1	+2	6	Advance to Second phase			1–0	1–0	
3	(Goiás) Vila Nova	4	2	0	2	6	6	0	4		1–4				3–1
4	(Mato Grosso) União Rondonópolis	4	1	0	3	2	5	−3	2		1–2		0–2		
5	(Mato Grosso do Sul) Ubiratan	4	0	0	4	2	10	−8	0			0–1		0–1	

=== Group E ===
Pos	Team	Pld	W	D	L	GF	GA	GD	Pts	Qualification	BAN	NOR	ESP	MOG	CGD
1	(Rio de Janeiro (state)) Bangu	4	1	3	0	3	0	+3	5	Advance to Second phase		3–0		0–0	
2	(São Paulo (state)) Noroeste	4	2	1	1	6	5	+1	5					1–0	3–0
3	(Minas Gerais) Esportivo	4	1	2	1	5	5	0	4		0–0	2–2			
4	(São Paulo (state)) Mogi Mirim	4	1	1	2	2	3	−1	3				1–2		1–0
5	(Rio de Janeiro (state)) Campo Grande	4	1	1	2	2	5	−3	3		0–0		2–1		

=== Group F ===
Pos	Team	Pld	W	D	L	GF	GA	GD	Pts	Qualification	PAR	CAX	PON	BAN	AME
1	(Paraná (state)) Paraná	4	3	1	0	8	1	+7	7	Advance to Second phase		4–1			2–0
2	(Rio Grande do Sul) Caxias	4	2	0	2	5	7	−2	4				2–1	2–1	
3	(São Paulo (state)) Ponte Preta	4	1	2	1	3	3	0	4		0–0			1–1	
4	(Paraná (state)) União Bandeirante	4	1	1	2	3	5	−2	3		0–2				1–0
5	(São Paulo (state)) América	4	1	0	3	1	4	−3	2			1–0	0–1		

== Second phase ==
Matches played on 4 and 11 November.

Team 1	Agg.	Team 2	1st leg	2nd leg
América Mineiro (Minas Gerais)	4–2	(Pará) Paysandu	4–0	0–2
Fortaleza (Ceará)	1–1	(Rio Grande do Norte) América de Natal	0–0	1–1
Gama (Federal District (Brazil))	1–4	(Goiás) Atlético Goianiense	1–0	0–4
Bangu (Rio de Janeiro (state))	1–1	(Paraná (state)) Paraná	1–1	0–0

Paraná and América de Natal qualified due to best record.

== Semifinal ==
Team 1	Agg.	Team 2	1st leg	2nd leg
América Mineiro (Minas Gerais)	2–1	(Paraná (state)) Paraná	1–0	1–1
América de Natal (Rio Grande do Norte)	2–7	(Goiás) Atlético Goianiense	0–2	2–5

== Final ==
2 December 1990

América Mineiro	0–0	Atlético Goianiense

Estádio Independência, Belo Horizonte, Minas Gerais

9 December 1990

Atlético Goianiense	0–0	América Mineiro
Penalties
	3–2

Estádio Serra Dourada, Goiânia, Goiás

Atlético Goianiense declared as the Campeonato Brasileiro Série C champions after a 3–2 penalty win (0–0 aggregate score).
