= 1989 Campeonato Brasileiro Série B =

Campeonato Brasileiro Série B
- Season: 1989
- Champions: Bragantino (1st title)
- Promoted: Bragantino; São José
- Matches: 542
- Goals: 1,007 (1.86 per match)
- Biggest home win: Criciúma 6-0 Figueirense (12 November 1989)
- Biggest away win: Mixto 0-4 Nacional (13 September 1989); Nacional de Patos 0-4 Treze (30 September 1989); Lagarto 0-4 Catuense (21 October 1989)
- Highest scoring: 4 de Julho 3-4 Flamengo-PI (28 October 1989)

The football (soccer) Campeonato Brasileiro Série B 1989, the second level of Brazilian National League, was played from 9 September to 20 December 1989. The competition had 96 clubs and two of them were promoted to Série A. The competition was won by Bragantino.

== Championship ==
=== First phase ===
==== Group A ====
Pos	Team	Pld	W	D	L	GF	GA	GD	Pts	Qualification or relegation
1	(Acre (state)) Rio Branco	10	6	0	4	11	10	+1	12	Qualified
2	(Amazonas (Brazilian state)) Rio Negro	10	5	2	3	9	3	+6	12	Qualified
3	(Amazonas (Brazilian state)) Nacional	10	4	3	3	9	5	+4	11	
4	(Mato Grosso) Dom Bosco	10	5	0	5	13	11	+2	10	
5	(Mato Grosso) Mixto	10	4	0	6	9	13	−4	8	
6	(Amazonas (Brazilian state)) Princesa do Solimões	10	3	1	6	12	21	−9	7	

Updated to match(es) played on 29 October 1989. Source: RSSSF.com
Rules for classification: 1) points; 2) wins; 3) goal difference; 4) number of goals scored.

==== Group B ====
Pos	Team	Pld	W	D	L	GF	GA	GD	Pts	Qualification or relegation
1	(Goiás) Anapolina	10	6	1	3	15	10	+5	13	Qualified
2	(Federal District (Brazil)) Ceilândia	10	5	2	3	11	9	+2	12	Qualified
3	(Federal District (Brazil)) Sobradinho	10	4	1	5	11	16	−5	9	
4	(Goiás) Vila Nova	10	3	3	4	12	11	+1	9	
5	(Federal District (Brazil)) Taguatinga	10	3	3	4	12	13	−1	9	
6	(Goiás) Atlético	10	3	2	5	11	13	−2	8	

Updated to match(es) played on 29 October 1989. Source: RSSSF.com
Rules for classification: 1) points; 2) wins; 3) goal difference; 4) number of goals scored.

==== Group C ====
Pos	Team	Pld	W	D	L	GF	GA	GD	Pts	Qualification or relegation
1	(Maranhão) Moto Clube	10	5	4	1	17	7	+10	14	Qualified
2	(Pará) Remo	10	5	3	2	11	7	+4	13	Qualified
3	(Pará) Paysandu	10	4	4	2	10	6	+4	12	
4	Maranhão	10	2	4	4	11	17	−6	8	
5	(Maranhão) Sampaio Corrêa	10	2	3	5	6	13	−7	7	
6	(Pará) Tuna Luso	10	1	4	5	7	12	−5	6	

Updated to match(es) played on 29 October 1989. Source: RSSSF.com
Rules for classification: 1) points; 2) wins; 3) goal difference; 4) number of goals scored.

==== Group D ====
Pos	Team	Pld	W	D	L	GF	GA	GD	Pts	Qualification or relegation
1	(Ceará) Fortaleza	10	4	5	1	9	5	+4	13	Qualified
2	Ceará	10	4	4	2	9	6	+3	12	Qualified
3	(Piauí) Flamengo	10	4	4	2	11	10	+1	12	
4	(Piauí) River	10	4	3	3	8	8	0	11	
5	(Ceará) Ferroviário	10	3	2	5	9	10	−1	8	
6	(Piauí) 4 de Julho	10	1	2	7	10	17	−7	4	

Updated to match(es) played on 29 October 1989. Source: RSSSF.com
Rules for classification: 1) points; 2) wins; 3) goal difference; 4) number of goals scored.

==== Group E ====
Pos	Team	Pld	W	D	L	GF	GA	GD	Pts	Qualification or relegation
1	(Rio Grande do Norte) ABC	10	5	4	1	10	4	+6	14	Qualified
2	(Paraíba) Treze	10	3	6	1	12	6	+6	12	Qualified
3	(Rio Grande do Norte) América	10	4	3	3	13	11	+2	11	
4	(Paraíba) Nacional de Patos	10	4	2	4	11	13	−2	10	
5	(Paraíba) Botafogo	10	3	1	6	9	14	−5	7	
6	(Rio Grande do Norte) Baraúnas	10	1	4	5	4	11	−7	6	

Updated to match(es) played on 29 October 1989. Source: RSSSF.com
Rules for classification: 1) points; 2) wins; 3) goal difference; 4) number of goals scored.

==== Group F ====
Pos	Team	Pld	W	D	L	GF	GA	GD	Pts	Qualification or relegation
1	(Pernambuco) Central	10	7	3	0	14	3	+11	17	Qualified
2	(Pernambuco) Santa Cruz	10	6	3	1	14	2	+12	15	Qualified
3	(Alagoas) CRB	10	4	4	2	9	5	+4	12	
4	(Alagoas) Capelense	10	2	4	4	7	8	−1	8	
5	(Alagoas) CSA	10	3	1	6	5	14	−9	7	
6	(Pernambuco) América	10	0	1	9	2	19	−17	1	

Updated to match(es) played on 29 October 1989. Source: RSSSF.com
Rules for classification: 1) points; 2) wins; 3) goal difference; 4) number of goals scored.

==== Group G ====
Pos	Team	Pld	W	D	L	GF	GA	GD	Pts	Qualification or relegation
1	(Bahia) Catuense	10	5	4	1	12	4	+8	14	Qualified
2	(Sergipe) Confiança	10	4	5	1	11	5	+6	13	Qualified
3	(Bahia) Fluminense de Feira	10	3	6	1	8	6	+2	12	
4	(Bahia) Leônico	10	3	3	4	7	8	−1	9	
5	Sergipe	10	1	6	3	6	9	−3	8	
6	(Sergipe) Lagarto	10	0	4	6	2	14	−12	4	

Updated to match(es) played on 29 October 1989. Source: RSSSF.com
Rules for classification: 1) points; 2) wins; 3) goal difference; 4) number of goals scored.

==== Group H ====
Pos	Team	Pld	W	D	L	GF	GA	GD	Pts	Qualification or relegation
1	(Rio de Janeiro (state)) Itaperuna	10	5	4	1	11	4	+7	14	Qualified
2	(Rio de Janeiro (state)) Americano	10	5	3	2	14	5	+9	13	Qualified
3	(Rio de Janeiro (state)) AA Cabofriense	10	4	3	3	9	9	0	11	
4	(Espírito Santo) Rio Branco	10	3	5	2	9	5	+4	11	
5	(Espírito Santo) Desportiva	10	3	1	6	7	17	−10	7	
6	(Espírito Santo) Colatina	10	1	2	7	7	17	−10	4	

Updated to match(es) played on 29 October 1989. Source: RSSSF.com
Rules for classification: 1) points; 2) wins; 3) goal difference; 4) number of goals scored.

==== Group I ====
Pos	Team	Pld	W	D	L	GF	GA	GD	Pts	Qualification or relegation
1	(São Paulo (state)) Botafogo	10	5	3	2	9	7	+2	13	Qualified
2	(São Paulo (state)) Catanduvense	10	4	5	1	11	5	+6	13	Qualified
3	(Minas Gerais) Uberlândia	10	2	5	3	8	9	−1	9	
4	(Goiás) Goiatuba	10	1	7	2	3	4	−1	9	
5	(Goiás) Goiânia	10	3	2	5	10	14	−4	8	
6	(São Paulo (state)) América	10	1	6	3	3	5	−2	8	

Updated to match(es) played on 29 October 1989. Source: RSSSF.com
Rules for classification: 1) points; 2) wins; 3) goal difference; 4) number of goals scored.

==== Group J ====
Pos	Team	Pld	W	D	L	GF	GA	GD	Pts	Qualification or relegation
1	(São Paulo (state)) Bragantino	10	8	2	0	17	3	+14	18	Qualified
2	(São Paulo (state)) São José	10	3	4	3	6	6	0	10	Qualified
3	(Rio de Janeiro (state)) Volta Redonda	10	3	4	3	6	13	−7	10	
4	(São Paulo (state)) Novorizontino	10	2	5	3	9	7	+2	9	
5	(Minas Gerais) Esportivo	10	2	3	5	2	7	−5	7	
6	(São Paulo (state)) Santo André	10	2	2	6	7	11	−4	6	

Updated to match(es) played on 29 October 1989. Source: RSSSF.com
Rules for classification: 1) points; 2) wins; 3) goal difference; 4) number of goals scored.

==== Group L ====
Pos	Team	Pld	W	D	L	GF	GA	GD	Pts	Qualification or relegation
1	(Rio de Janeiro (state)) América	10	5	3	2	15	10	+5	13	Qualified
2	(São Paulo (state)) União São João	10	4	3	3	13	9	+4	11	Qualified
3	(Minas Gerais) Democrata-SL	10	4	3	3	12	16	−4	11	
4	(Rio de Janeiro (state)) Bangu	10	4	2	4	12	12	0	10	
5	(Minas Gerais) Valeriodoce	10	3	2	5	9	10	−1	8	
6	(Minas Gerais) Tupi	10	2	3	5	7	11	−4	7	

Updated to match(es) played on 29 October 1989. Source: RSSSF.com
Rules for classification: 1) points; 2) wins; 3) goal difference; 4) number of goals scored.

==== Group M ====
Pos	Team	Pld	W	D	L	GF	GA	GD	Pts	Qualification or relegation
1	(São Paulo (state)) Juventus	10	4	6	0	13	7	+6	14	Qualified
2	(São Paulo (state)) XV de Piracicaba	10	4	4	2	9	6	+3	12	Qualified
3	(Minas Gerais) Rio Branco	10	4	4	2	9	9	0	12	
4	(São Paulo (state)) Mogi Mirim	10	2	5	3	7	11	−4	9	
5	(Minas Gerais) América	10	2	3	5	9	9	0	7	
6	(São Paulo (state)) Ponte Preta	10	2	2	6	7	12	−5	6	

Updated to match(es) played on 29 October 1989. Source: RSSSF.com
Rules for classification: 1) points; 2) wins; 3) goal difference; 4) number of goals scored.

==== Group N ====
Pos	Team	Pld	W	D	L	GF	GA	GD	Pts	Qualification or relegation
1	(Paraná (state)) Grêmio Maringá	10	6	3	1	13	7	+6	15	Qualified
2	(Paraná (state)) Londrina	10	5	2	3	8	5	+3	12	Qualified
3	(Mato Grosso do Sul) Operário	10	3	5	2	14	11	+3	11	
4	(Mato Grosso do Sul) Douradense	10	2	4	4	7	11	−4	8	
5	(Mato Grosso do Sul) Ubiratan	10	2	4	4	9	14	−5	8	
6	(Mato Grosso) União Rondonópolis	10	1	4	5	4	7	−3	6	

Updated to match(es) played on 29 October 1989. Source: RSSSF.com
Rules for classification: 1) points; 2) wins; 3) goal difference; 4) number of goals scored.

==== Group O ====
Pos	Team	Pld	W	D	L	GF	GA	GD	Pts	Qualification or relegation
1	(Santa Catarina (state)) Blumenau	10	6	3	1	10	5	+5	15	Qualified
2	(Rio Grande do Sul) Juventude	10	5	2	3	14	10	+4	12	Qualified
3	(Santa Catarina (state)) Brusque	10	5	2	3	16	14	+2	12	
4	(Rio Grande do Sul) Glória	10	4	4	2	13	9	+4	12	
5	(Santa Catarina (state)) Marcílio Dias	10	3	1	6	11	15	−4	7	
6	(Rio Grande do Sul) Esportivo	10	0	2	8	5	16	−11	2	

Updated to match(es) played on 29 October 1989. Source: RSSSF.com
Rules for classification: 1) points; 2) wins; 3) goal difference; 4) number of goals scored.

==== Group P ====
Pos	Team	Pld	W	D	L	GF	GA	GD	Pts	Qualification or relegation
1	(Santa Catarina (state)) Joinville	10	6	2	2	9	2	+7	14	Qualified
2	(Paraná (state)) Operário	10	4	5	1	10	5	+5	13	Qualified
3	(São Paulo (state)) Noroeste	10	3	4	3	7	5	+2	10	
4	(Paraná (state)) Foz do Iguaçu	10	3	4	3	7	9	−2	10	
5	(Rio Grande do Sul) Caxias	10	2	4	4	4	7	−3	8	
6	(Paraná (state)) Pinheiros	10	1	3	6	4	13	−9	5	

Updated to match(es) played on 29 October 1989. Source: RSSSF.com
Rules for classification: 1) points; 2) wins; 3) goal difference; 4) number of goals scored.

==== Group Q ====
Pos	Team	Pld	W	D	L	GF	GA	GD	Pts	Qualification or relegation
1	(Santa Catarina (state)) Criciúma	10	5	4	1	22	8	+14	14	Qualified
2	(Santa Catarina (state)) Figueirense	10	4	4	2	8	10	−2	12	Qualified
3	(Rio Grande do Sul) Novo Hamburgo	10	2	6	2	6	6	0	10	
4	(Rio Grande do Sul) Santa Cruz	10	2	5	3	13	15	−2	9	
5	(Rio Grande do Sul) Pelotas	10	2	4	4	6	11	−5	8	
6	(Santa Catarina (state)) Avaí	10	2	3	5	8	13	−5	7	

Updated to match(es) played on 29 October 1989. Source: RSSSF.com
Rules for classification: 1) points; 2) wins; 3) goal difference; 4) number of goals scored.

=== Second phase ===
Team 1	Agg.	Team 2	1st leg	2nd leg
Rio Negro	2–2 (p. 2–3)	Anapolina	1–1	1–1
Ceilândia	0–1	Rio Branco-AC	0–0	0–1
Fortaleza	0–2	Remo	0–0	0–2
Ceará	2–2 (p. 5–4)	Moto Clube	1–1	1–1
ABC	1–5	Central	1–4	0–1
Treze	2–2 (a)	Santa Cruz	0–0	2–2
Confiança	1–2	Itaperuna	0–0	1–2
Americano	2–2 (a)	Catuense	1–2	1–0
São José	1–0	Botafogo-SP	1–0	0–0
Catanduvense	1–2	Bragantino	0–1	1–1
XV de Piracicaba	1–0	América-RJ	1–0	0–0
União São João	1–2	Juventus	1–0	0–2
Operário-PR	3–2	Grêmio Maringá	2–0	1–2
Londrina	1–2	Joinville	1–1	0–1
Figueirense	2–5	Juventude	0–2	2–3
Blumenau	1–1 (p. 2–4)	Criciúma	1–0	0–1

=== Third phase ===
Team 1	Agg.	Team 2	1st leg	2nd leg
Remo	1–0	Anapolina	1–0	0–0
Ceará	4–0	Rio Branco-AC	3–0	1–0
Catuense	2–2 (a)	Central	1–0	1–2
Treze	2–2 (a)	Itaperuna	2–2	0–0
São José	1–1 (a)	XV de Piracicaba	0–0	1–1
Juventus	2–4	Bragantino	0–1	2–3
Operário-PR	3–3 (a)	Juventude	2–2	1–1
Criciúma	2–1	Joinville	2–1	0–0

=== Quarterfinals ===
Team 1	Agg.	Team 2	1st leg	2nd leg
Ceará	1–2	Catuense	1–1	0–1
Itaperuna	1–2	Remo	0–0	1–2
São José	0–0 (p. 6–5)	Juventude	0–0	0–0
Criciúma	1–3	Bragantino	1–0	0–3

=== Semifinals ===
Team 1	Agg.	Team 2	1st leg	2nd leg
Remo	0–0 (p. 1–4)	Bragantino	0–0	0–0
Catuense	1–2	São José	1–1	0–1

=== Finals ===
Team 1	Agg.	Team 2	1st leg	2nd leg
São José	1–3	Bragantino	0–1	1–2

16 December 1989
Finals

São José	0 – 1	Bragantino
		Daniel 35'

Estádio Martins Pereira, São José dos Campos
Attendance: 3,820
Referee: José de Assis Aragão
20 December 1989
Finals

Bragantino	2 – 1	São José
Ivair 28' (pen.); Gatãozinho 58'		Moura 6'

Estádio Marcelo Stéfani, Bragança Paulista
Attendance: 6,723
Referee: Edmundo Lima Filho

Bragantino wins by 3–1 on aggregate
