= Pedro Paulo (footballer, born 1985) =

Brazilian footballer

Personal information
- Full name: Pedro Paulo da Silva
- Date of birth: 29 June 1985 (age 41)
- Place of birth: Datas, Brazil
- Height: 1.72 m (5 ft 8 in)
- Position: Striker

Team information
- Current team: Uberlândia

Youth career
- 2005: Atlético Mineiro

Senior career*
Years	Team	Apps	(Gls)
2006–2011	Atlético Mineiro	16	(2)
2006	→ Democrata GV-MG (loan)		
2007	→ ÖIS (loan)	1	(1)
2007	→ Passense (loan)		
2008	→ Caldense (loan)		
2008	→ CRB (loan)		
2010	→ Goianiense (loan)	12	(2)
2011	→ Ipatinga (loan)		
2011	→ Duque de Caxias (loan)		
2012	Boa Esporte	3	(0)
2013–	Uberlândia		
- * Club domestic league appearances and goals as of November 8, 2011

Pedro Paulo da Silva or simply Pedro Paulo (born 29 June 1985) is a Brazilian footballer who plays as a striker for Uberlândia.

== Club career ==
He was loaned to Democrata GV-MG in 2006 season. In April 2007, he was loaned to ÖIS at Superettan. But in September 2007, he was loaned to Passense. In January 2008, he was moved to CRB for one-year loan, but loaned by CRB to Caldense for their Campeonato Mineiro 2008.

== Contract ==
- Atlético Mineiro 26 March 2007 to 31 December 2009
