= 1988 in Brazilian football =

Football in Brazil
- Season: 1988

The following article presents a summary of the 1988 football (soccer) season in Brazil, which was the 87th season of competitive football in the country.

== Campeonato Brasileiro Série A ==
=== Quarterfinals ===
Team 1	Agg.	Team 2	1st leg	2nd leg
Grêmio	1-0	Flamengo	0-0	1-0
Sport	1-1	Bahia	1-1	0-0 (0-0 after extra time)
Fluminense	4-2	Vasco da Gama	1-0	1-2 (2-0 after extra time)
Cruzeiro	0-2	Internacional	0-0	0-2

=== Semifinals ===
Team 1	Agg.	Team 2	1st leg	2nd leg
Grêmio	1-2	Internacional	0-0	1-2
Fluminense	1-2	Bahia	0-0	1-2

=== Final ===
February 15, 1989

Bahia	2–1	Internacional

Fonte Nova

February 19, 1989

Internacional	0–0	Bahia

Beira-Rio

Bahia declared as the Campeonato Brasileiro champions by aggregate score of 2-1.

=== Relegation ===
The four worst placed teams in the first stage, which are Bangu, Santa Cruz, Criciúma and América-RJ, were relegated to the following year's second level.

== Campeonato Brasileiro Série B ==
Pos	Team	Pld	W	PKW	PKL	L	GF	GA	GD	Pts
1	(São Paulo (state)) Inter de Limeira	6	2	3	0	1	7	6	+1	12
2	(Pernambuco) Náutico	6	2	2	1	1	6	5	+1	11
3	(São Paulo (state)) Ponte Preta	6	3	0	2	1	10	6	+4	11
4	(Rio de Janeiro (state)) Americano	6	0	0	2	4	2	8	−6	2

Source: rssfbrasil.com

Internacional-SP declared as the Campeonato Brasileiro Série B champions.

=== Promotion ===
The two best placed teams in the final stage of the competition, which are Internacional-SP and Náutico, were promoted to the following year's first level.

=== Relegation ===
The worst placed team in each one of the four groups in the first stage, which are Treze, Rio Branco-ES, Uberlândia, and Pelotas, were relegated to the following year's third level.

== Campeonato Brasileiro Série C ==
=== Third Stage ===
Group 19
Pos	Team	Pld	W	PKW	PKL	L	GF	GA	GD	Pts	Qualification
1	Esportivo-MG	4	2	1	0	1	9	2	+7	8	Advanced to the final
2	Botafogo-PB	4	2	0	0	2	5	7	−2	6	
3	Lagarto-SE	4	1	0	1	2	2	7	−5	4	

Source: rsssfbrasil.com

Group 20
Pos	Team	Pld	W	PKW	PKL	L	GF	GA	GD	Pts	Qualification
1	União São João	4	2	0	1	1	5	3	+2	7	Advanced to the final
2	Marcílio Dias	4	2	0	0	2	4	4	0	6	
3	Tiradentes-DF	4	1	1	0	2	3	5	−2	5	

Source: rsssfbrasil.com
Rules for classification: 3 points for victory, 2 points for victory on penalties, 1 point for defeat on penalties.

=== Final ===
December 16, 1988

Esportivo-MG	1–1	União São João

December 18, 1988

União São João	2–2	Esportivo-MG

União São João declared as the Campeonato Brasileiro Série C champions by aggregate score of 3-3 due to better season record.

=== Promotion ===
The champion and the runner-up, which are União São João and Esportivo-MG, were promoted to the following year's first level.

== State championship champions ==
State	Champion	State	Champion
Acre	Rio Branco-AC	Paraíba	Botafogo-PB
Alagoas	CSA	Paraná	Atlético Paranaense
Amapá	Amapá	Pernambuco	Sport Recife
Amazonas	Rio Negro	Piauí	Flamengo-PI
Bahia	Bahia	Rio de Janeiro	Vasco
Ceará	Ferroviário-CE	Rio Grande do Norte	América-RN
Distrito Federal	Tiradentes-DF	Rio Grande do Sul	Grêmio
Espírito Santo	Ibiraçu	Rondônia	not disputed
Goiás	Atlético Goianiense	Roraima	Baré
Maranhão	Sampaio Corrêa	Santa Catarina	Avaí
Mato Grosso	Mixto	São Paulo	Corinthians
Mato Grosso do Sul	Operário	Sergipe	Confiança
Minas Gerais	Atlético Mineiro	Tocantins	-
Pará	Tuna Luso		

== Youth competition champions ==
Competition	Champion
Copa São Paulo de Juniores	Nacional-SP
Taça Belo Horizonte de Juniores	Atlético Mineiro

== Other competition champions ==
Competition	Champion
Torneio de Integração da Amazônia	Trem

== Brazilian clubs in international competitions ==
Team	Copa Libertadores 1988	Supercopa Sudamericana 1988
Cruzeiro	Did not qualify	Runner-up
Flamengo	Did not qualify	Quarterfinals
Grêmio	Did not qualify	Quarterfinals
Guarani	Second round	Did not qualify
Santos	Did not qualify	Round of 16
Sport Recife	Group stage	Did not qualify

== Brazil national team ==
The following table lists all the games played by the Brazil national football team in official competitions and friendly matches during 1988.

Date	Opposition	Result	Score	Brazil scorers	Competition
July 7, 1988	Australia	W	1-0	Romário	Australia Bicentenary Gold Cup
July 10, 1988	Argentina	D	0-0	-	Australia Bicentenary Gold Cup
July 13, 1988	Saudi Arabia	W	4-1	Geovani (2), Jorginho, Edmar	Australia Bicentenary Gold Cup
July 17, 1988	Australia	W	2-0	Romário, Müller	Australia Bicentenary Gold Cup
July 28, 1988	Norway	D	1-1	Edmar	International Friendly
July 31, 1988	Sweden	D	1-1	Jorginho	International Friendly
August 3, 1988	Austria	W	2-0	Edmar, Andrade	International Friendly
October 12, 1988	Belgium	W	2-1	Geovani (2)	International Friendly

== Women's football ==
=== National team ===
The following table lists all the games played by the Brazil women's national football team in official competitions and friendly matches during 1988.

Date	Opposition	Result	Score	Brazil scorers	Competition
June 1, 1988	Australia	L	0–1	-	FIFA Invitational World Cup
June 3, 1988	Norway	D	2–1	unavailable	FIFA Invitational World Cup
June 5, 1988	Thailand	W	9–0	unavailable	FIFA Invitational World Cup
June 8, 1988	Netherlands	W	2–1	unavailable	FIFA Invitational World Cup
June 10, 1988	Norway	L	1–2	unavailable	FIFA Invitational World Cup
June 12, 1988	China	D	0–0	-	FIFA Invitational World Cup

=== Domestic competition champions ===
Competition	Champion
Campeonato Carioca	Radar
