= 2004 in Brazilian football =

Football in Brazil
- Season: 2004

The following article presents a summary of the 2004 football (soccer) season in Brazil, which was the 103rd season of competitive football in the country.

== Campeonato Brasileiro Série A ==
Pos	Team	Pld	W	D	L	GF	GA	GD	Pts	Qualification or relegation
1	Santos	46	27	8	11	103	58	+45	89	Qualified for the 2005 Copa Libertadores
2	Atlético Paranaense	46	25	11	10	93	56	+37	86	Qualified for the 2005 Copa Libertadores
3	São Paulo	46	24	10	12	78	43	+35	82	Qualified for the 2005 Copa Libertadores
4	Palmeiras	46	22	13	11	72	47	+25	79	Qualified for the 2005 Copa Libertadores
5	Corinthians	46	20	14	12	54	54	0	74	Qualified for the 2005 Copa Sudamericana
6	Goiás	46	21	9	16	81	68	+13	72	Qualified for the 2005 Copa Sudamericana
7	Juventude	46	20	10	16	60	66	−6	70	Qualified for the 2005 Copa Sudamericana
8	Internacional	46	20	7	19	66	59	+7	67	Qualified for the 2005 Copa Sudamericana
9	Fluminense	46	18	13	15	65	68	−3	67	Qualified for the 2005 Copa Sudamericana
10	Ponte Preta	46	19	7	20	43	73	−30	64	
11	Figueirense	46	17	12	17	57	59	−2	63	
12	Coritiba	46	15	17	14	53	48	+5	62	
13	Cruzeiro	46	16	8	22	69	81	−12	56	
14	Paysandu	46	14	14	18	56	76	−20	56	
15	Paraná	46	15	9	22	52	73	−21	54	
16	Vasco	46	14	12	20	64	68	−4	54	
17	Flamengo	46	13	15	18	51	53	−2	54	
18	São Caetano	46	23	8	15	65	49	+16	53 (Note: São Caetano lost 24 points due to the incident leading to the death of footballer Serginho)	
19	Atlético Mineiro	46	12	17	17	60	66	−6	53	
20	Botafogo	46	11	18	17	62	71	−9	51	
21	Criciúma	46	13	11	22	61	78	−17	50	Relegation
22	Guarani	46	11	16	19	43	55	−12	49	Relegation
23	Vitória	46	13	9	24	68	87	−19	48	Relegation
24	Grêmio	46	9	12	25	60	80	−20	39	Relegation

Notes:

Santos declared as the Campeonato Brasileiro champions.

=== Relegation ===
The four worst placed teams, which are Criciúma, Guarani, Vitória and Grêmio, were relegated to the following year's second level.

== Campeonato Brasileiro Série B ==
Pos	Team	Pld	W	D	L	GF	GA	GD	Pts	BRA	FOR	AVA	BAH
1	Brasiliense	6	4	0	2	8	5	+3	12		1–0	2–0	2–1
2	Fortaleza	6	2	2	2	4	4	0	8	1–0		2–0	1–1
3	Avaí	6	2	2	2	4	5	−1	8	1–0	2–0		1–0
4	Bahia	6	1	2	3	7	9	−2	5	2–3	2–0	1–1	

Brasiliense declared as the Campeonato Brasileiro Série B champions.

=== Promotion ===
The two best placed teams in the final stage of the competition, which are Brasiliense and Fortaleza, were promoted to the following year's first level.

=== Relegation ===
The six worst placed teams, which are América-RN, Remo, América-MG, Joinville, Mogi Mirim and Londrina, were relegated to the following year's third level.

== Campeonato Brasileiro Série C ==
Pos	Team	Pld	W	D	L	GF	GA	GD	Pts	UBR	GAM	AMR	LIM
1	União Barbarense (P)	6	5	0	1	11	6	+5	15		2–1	1–0	3–2
2	Gama (P)	6	3	1	2	17	10	+7	10	1–4		1–0	7–1
3	Americano	6	1	2	3	4	6	−2	5	0–1	2–2		1–0
4	Limoeiro	6	1	1	4	7	17	−10	4	2–0	1–5	1–1	

Source: rsssf.com
(P) Promoted to Série B 2005

União Barbarense declared as the Campeonato Brasileiro Série C champions.

=== Promotion ===
The two best placed teams in the final stage of the competition, which are União Barbarense and Gama, were promoted to the following year's second level.

== Copa do Brasil ==
The Copa do Brasil final was played between Santo André and Flamengo.

June 23, 2004

Santo André	2–2	Flamengo

Parque Antártica

June 30, 2004

Flamengo	0–2	Santo André

Maracanã

Santo André declared as the cup champions by aggregate score of 4-2.

== State championship champions ==
State	Champion	State	Champion
Acre	Rio Branco	Paraíba	Campinense
Alagoas	Corinthians Alagoano	Paraná	Coritiba
Amapá	Ypiranga	Pernambuco	Náutico
Amazonas	São Raimundo	Piauí	Parnahyba
Bahia	Vitória	Rio de Janeiro	Flamengo
Ceará	Fortaleza	Rio Grande do Norte	Potiguar
Distrito Federal	Brasiliense	Rio Grande do Sul	Internacional
Espírito Santo	Serra	Rondônia	União Cacoalense
Goiás	CRAC	Roraima	São Raimundo-RR
Maranhão	Moto Club	Santa Catarina	Figueirense
Mato Grosso	Ciuabá	São Paulo	São Caetano
Mato Grosso do Sul	CENE	Sergipe	Confiança
Minas Gerais	Cruzeiro	Tocantins	Palmas
Pará	Remo		

== Youth competition champions ==
Competition	Champion
Copa Macaé de Juvenis	Grêmio
Copa Santiago de Futebol Juvenil	Cruzeiro
Copa São Paulo de Juniores	Corinthians
Copa Sub-17 de Promissão	Cruzeiro
Taça Belo Horizonte de Juniores	Cruzeiro

== Other competition champions ==
Competition	Champion
Copa Espírito Santo	Estrela do Norte
Copa FGF	Esportivo
Copa FPF	Santos
Copa Governador do Mato Grosso	Luverdense
Copa Pernambuco	Vitória-PE
Taça Minas Gerais	Ipatinga

== Brazilian clubs in international competitions ==
Team	Copa Libertadores 2004	Copa Sudamericana 2004	Recopa Sudamericana 2004
Atlético Mineiro	Did not qualify	Preliminary round	N/A
Coritiba	Group stage	Preliminary round	N/A
Cruzeiro	Round of 16	Preliminary round	N/A
Figueirense	Did not qualify	Preliminary round	N/A
Flamengo	Did not qualify	Preliminary round	N/A
Goiás	Did not qualify	Preliminary round	N/A
Grêmio	Did not qualify	Preliminary round	N/A
Internacional	Did not qualify	Semifinals	N/A
Paraná	Did not qualify	Preliminary round	N/A
Santos	Quarterfinals	Quarterfinals	N/A
São Caetano	Quarterfinals	Preliminary round	N/A
São Paulo	Semifinals	Preliminary round	N/A

== Brazil national team ==
The following table lists all the games played by the Brazil national football team in official competitions and friendly matches during 2004.

Date	Opposition	Result	Score	Brazil scorers	Competition
February 18, 2004	Republic of Ireland	D	0–0	-	International Friendly
March 31, 2004	Paraguay	D	0–0	-	World Cup Qualifying
April 28, 2004	Hungary	W	4–1	Kaká, Fabiano (2), Ronaldinho	International Friendly
May 20, 2004	France	D	0–0	-	International Friendly
May 25, 2004	Catalonia	W	5–2	Ronaldo (2), Oliveira (2), Baptista	International Friendly (unofficial match)
June 2, 2004	Argentina	W	3–1	Ronaldo (3)	World Cup Qualifying
June 6, 2004	Chile	D	1–1	Fabiano	World Cup Qualifying
July 8, 2004	Chile	W	1–0	Fabiano	Copa América
July 11, 2004	Costa Rica	W	4–1	Adriano (3), Juan	Copa América
July 14, 2004	Paraguay	L	1–2	Fabiano	Copa América
July 18, 2004	Mexico	W	4–0	Alex, Adriano (2), Oliveira	Copa América
July 25, 2004	Uruguay	D	1–1 (5–3 pen)	Adriano	Copa América
July 25, 2004	Argentina	D	2–2 (4–2 pen)	Luisão, Adriano	Copa América
August 18, 2004	Haiti	W	6–0	Roger (2), Ronaldinho (3), Nilmar	International Friendly
September 5, 2004	Bolivia	W	3–1	Ronaldo, Ronaldinho, Adriano	World Cup Qualifying
September 8, 2004	Germany	D	1–1	Ronaldinho	International Friendly
October 9, 2004	Venezuela	W	5–2	Kaká (2), Ronaldo (2), Adriano	World Cup Qualifying
October 13, 2004	Colombia	D	0–0	-	World Cup Qualifying
October 17, 2004	Ecuador	L	0–1	-	World Cup Qualifying

== Women's football ==
=== Brazil women's national football team ===
The following table lists all the games played by the Brazil women's national football team in official competitions and friendly matches during 2004.

Date	Opposition	Result	Score	Brazil scorers	Competition
April 12, 2004	Texas A&M University	W	5–1	Kátia Cilene (2), Cristiane Silva, Rosana, Formiga	International Friendly (unofficial match)
April 15, 2004	Oklahoma State	W	4–1	Cristiane Silva (2), Rosana, Kelly	International Friendly (unofficial match)
April 18, 2004	(United States) Southern Methodist University	W	5–0	Cristiane Silva, Formiga, Kelly, Rosana, Kátia Cilene	International Friendly (unofficial match)
April 24, 2004	United States	L	1–5	Marta	International Friendly
July 21, 2004	(Sweden) Umeå	D	1–1	Kelly	International Friendly (unofficial match)
July 23, 2004	(Sweden) Umeå/Själevads	W	5–0	Marta (2), Formiga, Pretinha, Roseli	International Friendly (unofficial match)
July 27, 2004	(Norway) Trondheims-Ørn	W	4–0	Marta (2), Formiga, Pretinha	International Friendly (unofficial match)
July 29, 2004	(Sweden) Umeå Södra	W	9–0	Roseli (2), Pretinha, Cristiane Silva, Rosana, Elaine, Kelly, Marta (2)	International Friendly (unofficial match)
August 11, 2004	Australia	W	1–0	Marta	Summer Olympics
August 14, 2004	United States	L	0–2	-	Summer Olympics
August 17, 2004	Greece	W	7–0	Pretinha, Cristiane Silva (3), Grazielle, Marta, Daniela Alves	Summer Olympics
August 20, 2004	Mexico	W	5–0	Cristiane Silva (2), Formiga (2), Marta	Summer Olympics
August 23, 2004	Sweden	W	1–0	Pretinha	Summer Olympics
August 25, 2004	United States	L	1–1 (aet: 0–1)	Pretinha	Summer Olympics

The Brazil women's national football team competed in the following competitions in 2004:

Competition	Performance
Summer Olympics	Runner-up

=== Domestic competition champions ===
Competition	Champion
Campeonato Carioca	Campo Grande (AFFER)
Campeonato Paulista	Extra/Fundesport
