= Romualdo (footballer) =

Brazilian footballer

Personal information
- Full name: Romualdo Dantas e Silva
- Date of birth: 4 November 1974 (age 51)
- Place of birth: Natal, Brazil
- Height: 1.76 m (5 ft 9 1/2 in)
- Position: Forward

Senior career*
Years	Team	Apps	(Gls)
1994–2003	Gama	203	(46)
1999	→ Guarani (loan)	5	(0)
2003	→ União Barbarense (loan)	2	(0)
2003	→ Marília	13	(2)
2004	Figueirense	40	(2)
2004	Ponte Preta	1	(0)
2005	Náutico	1	(0)
2007	Gama	18	(5)
2008	Americano	0	(0)
Total		283	(55)
- * Club domestic league appearances and goals

Romualdo Dantas e Silva (born 4 November 1974) is a Brazilian former footballer, commonly known as Romualdo. He played as a forward and is best known for his performances for Gama.

== Honours ==
Gama

- Campeonato Brasileiro Série B: 1998

Figueirense

- Campeonato Catarinense: 2004
