= 2004 Campeonato Brasileiro Série C =

Campeonato Brasileiro Série C
- Season: 2004
- Champions: União Barbarense
- Promoted: União Barbarense; Gama
- Matches played: 238
- Goals scored: 605 (2.54 per match)
- Top goalscorer: 10 goals: Frontini (União Barbarense); Marciano (Limoeiro); Vítor (Gama)
- Biggest home win: Moto Club 7-1 Tuna Luso (September 4, 2004); Gama 7-1 Limoeiro (November 28, 2004)
- Biggest away win: Ji-Paraná 0-5 União Esporte Clube (September 4, 2004)

The football (soccer) Campeonato Brasileiro Série C 2004, the third tier of Brazilian National League, was played from August 1 to November 28, 2004. The competition had 64 clubs and two of them were promoted to Série B.

União Barbarense finished the final phase group with most points and was declared 2004 Brazilian Série C champions, claiming the promotion to the 2005 Série B along with Gama, the runners-up.

== Participating teams ==
- Rio Branco (AC)
- Juventus (AC)
- Corinthians (AL)
- Coruripe (AL)
- Trem (AP)
- Ypiranga (AP)
- Grêmio Coariense (AM)
- Nacional Futebol Clube (AM)
- Atlético (BA)
- Catuense (BA)
- Ferroviário (CE)
- Limoeiro (CE)
- CFZ (DF)
- Gama (DF)
- Paranoá (DF)
- Rio Branco (ES)
- Desportiva (ES)
- CRAC (GO)
- Jataiense (GO)
- Moto Club (MA)
- Sampaio Corrêa (MA)
- Cuiabá (MT)
- União (MT)
- CENE (MS)
- Chapadão (MS)
- Ipatinga (MG)
- Tupi (MG)
- Villa Nova (MG)
- Castanhal (PA)
- Tuna Luso (PA)
- Campinense (PB)
- Treze (PB)
- Cianorte (PR)
- Iraty (PR)
- Nacional (PR)
- Itacuruba (PE)
- Porto (PE)
- Parnahyba (PI)
- River (PI)
- América (RJ)
- Americano (RJ)
- Friburguense (RJ)
- Portuguesa (RJ)
- Potiguar (RN)
- Baraúnas (RN)
- Esportivo (RS)
- Novo Hamburgo (RS)
- Ulbra (RS)
- União Cacoalense (RO)
- Ji-Paraná (RO)
- Atlético Roraima (RR)
- São Raimundo (RR)
- América (SP)
- Atlético Sorocaba (SP)
- Portuguesa Santista (SP)
- Rio Branco (SP)
- União Barbarense (SP)
- União São João (SP)
- Hermann Aichinger (SC)
- Lages (SC)
- Confiança (SE)
- Sergipe (SE)
- Gurupi (TO)
- Palmas (TO)

== Stages of the competition ==
=== First stage ===
Teams promoted to the second stage

Group 1 (AC-AM)

Pos	Team	Pld	W	D	L	GF	GA	GD	Pts	Qualification
1	(Amazonas (Brazilian state)) Grêmio Coariense	4	2	2	0	6	4	+2	8	Qualified for second stage
2	(Acre (state)) Rio Branco	4	1	1	2	5	6	−1	4	Qualified for second stage
3	(Amazonas (Brazilian state)) Nacional-AM	4	0	3	1	6	7	−1	3	

Group 2 (AP-RR)

Pos	Team	Pld	W	D	L	GF	GA	GD	Pts	Qualification
1	Atlético Roraima	2	0	2	0	1	1	0	2	Qualified for second stage
2	(Amapá) Trem	2	0	2	0	1	1	0	2	Qualified for second stage

Group 3 (MT-RO)

Pos	Team	Pld	W	D	L	GF	GA	GD	Pts	Qualification
1	(Mato Grosso) União	4	3	0	1	10	2	+8	9	Qualified for second stage
2	(Mato Grosso) Cuiabá	4	3	0	1	6	3	+3	9	Qualified for second stage
3	(Rondônia) Ji-Paraná	4	0	0	4	0	11	−11	0	

Group 4 (DF-TO)

Pos	Team	Pld	W	D	L	GF	GA	GD	Pts	Qualification
1	(Federal District (Brazil)) Gama	6	2	3	1	11	6	+5	9	Qualified for second stage
2	(Tocantins) Palmas	6	2	3	1	8	9	−1	9	Qualified for second stage
3	(Tocantins) Gurupi	6	2	1	3	4	8	−4	7	
4	(Federal District (Brazil)) CFZ-DF	6	1	3	2	7	7	0	6	

Group 5 (MA-PA)

Pos	Team	Pld	W	D	L	GF	GA	GD	Pts	Qualification
1	(Maranhão) Sampaio Corrêa	6	3	1	2	9	8	+1	10	Qualified for second stage
2	(Maranhão) Moto Club	6	3	0	3	17	15	+2	9	Qualified for second stage
3	(Pará) Castanhal	6	3	0	3	15	12	+3	9	
4	(Pará) Tuna Luso	6	2	1	3	8	15	−7	7	

Group 6 (CE-PI)

Pos	Team	Pld	W	D	L	GF	GA	GD	Pts	Qualification
1	(Ceará) Limoeiro	6	4	1	1	14	8	+6	13	Qualified for second stage
2	(Piauí) Parnahyba	6	2	2	2	6	7	−1	8	Qualified for second stage
3	(Ceará) Ferroviário-CE	6	2	1	3	6	7	−1	7	
4	(Piauí) River	6	1	2	3	5	9	−4	5	

Group 7 (PB-RN)

Pos	Team	Pld	W	D	L	GF	GA	GD	Pts	Qualification
1	(Paraíba) Treze	6	3	2	1	8	5	+3	11	Qualified for second stage
2	(Paraíba) Campinense	6	2	3	1	7	6	+1	9	Qualified for second stage
3	(Rio Grande do Norte) Potiguar	6	2	1	3	5	7	−2	7	
4	(Rio Grande do Norte) Baraúnas	6	1	2	3	7	9	−2	5	

Group 8 (AL-PE)

Pos	Team	Pld	W	D	L	GF	GA	GD	Pts	Qualification
1	(Pernambuco) Porto	6	4	0	2	11	5	+6	12	Qualified for second stage
2	(Pernambuco) Itacuruba	6	3	1	2	6	8	−2	10	Qualified for second stage
3	(Alagoas) Coruripe	6	2	1	3	8	9	−1	7	
4	(Alagoas) Corinthians-AL	6	1	2	3	8	11	−3	5	

Group 9 (BA-SE)

Pos	Team	Pld	W	D	L	GF	GA	GD	Pts	Qualification
1	(Sergipe) Confiança	6	3	1	2	4	4	0	10	Qualified for second stage
2	Sergipe	6	2	2	2	3	2	+1	8	Qualified for second stage
3	(Bahia) Atlético	6	2	2	2	5	5	0	8	
4	(Bahia) Catuense	6	1	3	2	2	3	−1	6	

Group 10 (ES-MG)

Pos	Team	Pld	W	D	L	GF	GA	GD	Pts	Qualification
1	(Minas Gerais) Villa Nova	6	4	0	2	9	5	+4	12	Qualified for second stage
2	(Espírito Santo) Serra	6	3	2	1	10	8	+2	11	Qualified for second stage
3	(Minas Gerais) Ipatinga	6	1	2	3	6	8	−2	5	
4	(Espírito Santo) Estrela do Norte	6	1	2	3	6	10	−4	5	

Group 11 (GO-MS)

Pos	Team	Pld	W	D	L	GF	GA	GD	Pts	Qualification
1	(Goiás) CRAC	6	3	3	0	8	3	+5	12	Qualified for second stage
2	(Mato Grosso do Sul) CENE	6	2	3	1	11	5	+6	9	Qualified for second stage
3	(Mato Grosso do Sul) Chapadão	6	1	2	3	4	8	−4	5	
4	(Goiás) Jataiense	6	1	2	3	5	12	−7	5	

Group 12 (DF-MG-RJ)

Pos	Team	Pld	W	D	L	GF	GA	GD	Pts	Qualification
1	(Rio de Janeiro (state)) Americano	6	4	0	2	8	3	+5	12	Qualified for second stage
2	(Federal District (Brazil)) Ceilândia	6	3	1	2	7	7	0	10 (Note: Won the berth in judicial dispute against Paranoá)	Qualified for second stage
3	(Minas Gerais) Tupi	6	2	1	3	5	9	−4	7	
4	(Rio de Janeiro (state)) Friburguense	6	1	2	3	5	6	−1	5	

Notes:

Group 13 (RJ-SP)

Pos	Team	Pld	W	D	L	GF	GA	GD	Pts	Qualification
1	(São Paulo (state)) Atlético Sorocaba	6	5	1	0	10	4	+6	16	Qualified for second stage
2	(São Paulo (state)) Portuguesa Santista	6	3	1	2	6	5	+1	10	Qualified for second stage
3	(Rio de Janeiro (state)) Portuguesa-RJ	6	1	3	2	3	5	−2	6	
4	(Rio de Janeiro (state)) América-RJ	6	0	1	5	1	6	−5	1	

Group 14 (SP)

Pos	Team	Pld	W	D	L	GF	GA	GD	Pts	Qualification
1	(São Paulo (state)) União Barbarense	6	4	2	0	7	3	+4	14	Qualified for second stage
2	(São Paulo (state)) Rio Branco	6	1	4	1	5	4	+1	7	Qualified for second stage
3	(São Paulo (state)) América-SP	6	1	2	3	4	7	−3	5	
4	(São Paulo (state)) União São João	6	0	4	2	3	5	−2	4	

Group 15 (PR-SC)

Pos	Team	Pld	W	D	L	GF	GA	GD	Pts	Qualification
1	(Paraná (state)) Iraty	6	4	2	0	8	2	+6	14	Qualified for second stage
2	(Santa Catarina (state)) Hermann Aichinger	6	1	4	1	7	4	+3	7	Qualified for second stage
3	(Paraná (state)) Nacional-PR	6	2	0	4	8	15	−7	6	
4	(Paraná (state)) Cianorte	6	1	2	3	6	8	−2	5	

Group 16 (RS-SC)

Pos	Team	Pld	W	D	L	GF	GA	GD	Pts	Qualification
1	(Rio Grande do Sul) Ulbra	6	4	1	1	8	5	+3	13	Qualified for second stage
2	(Rio Grande do Sul) Novo Hamburgo	6	4	0	2	8	6	+2	12	Qualified for second stage
3	(Rio Grande do Sul) Esportivo	6	1	2	3	9	12	−3	5	
4	(Santa Catarina (state)) Lages	6	1	1	4	8	10	−2	4	

=== Second stage ===
Team 1	Agg.	Team 2	1st leg	2nd leg
Trem	2–4	Grêmio Coariense	0–1	2–3
Rio Branco-AC	5–0	Atlético Roraima	5–0	0–0
Palmas	6–3	União	4–2	2–1
Cuiabá	3–6	Gama	2–4	1–2
Parnahyba	1–1(a)	Sampaio Corrêa	1–1	0–0
Moto Club	0–2	Limoeiro	0–0	0–2
Itacuruba	3–3(a)	Treze	2–2	1–1
Campinense	2–5	Porto	1–3	1–2
Serra	4–4(a)	Confiança	4–3	0–1
Sergipe	2–3	Villa Nova	2–1	0–2
Rio Branco-SP	3–3(a)	Atlético Sorocaba	1–0	2–3
Portuguesa Santista	2–5	União Barbarense	1–0	1–4
Novo Hamburgo	3–3(a)	Iraty	3–1	0–2
Hermann Aichinger	4–3	Ulbra	2–1	2–2
Ceilândia	3–4	CRAC	2–2	1–2
CENE	3–5	Americano	1–0	2–5

=== Third stage ===
Team 1	Agg.	Team 2	1st leg	2nd leg
Grêmio Coariense	4–4(p)	Rio Branco-AC	3–1	1–3
Palmas	1–3	Gama	0–0	1–3
Sampaio Corrêa	4–4(a)	Limoeiro	3–2	1–2
Porto	3–3(p)	Treze	1–2	2–1
Villa Nova	2–2(p)	Confiança	2–0	0–2
Rio Branco-SP	1–5	União Barbarense	0–2	1–3
Iraty	2–2(a)	Hermann Aichinger	1–0	1–2
CRAC	1–4	Americano	1–1	0–3

=== Fourth stage ===
Team 1	Agg.	Team 2	1st leg	2nd leg
Gama	4–2	Rio Branco-AC	2–0	2–2
Limoeiro	1–1(p)	Treze	1–0	0–1
Americano	1–0	Villa Nova	1–0	0–0
Iraty	1–2	União Barbarense	0–1	1–1

=== Final stage ===
Pos	Team	Pld	W	D	L	GF	GA	GD	Pts	UBR	GAM	AMR	LIM
1	União Barbarense (P)	6	5	0	1	11	6	+5	15		2–1	1–0	3–2
2	Gama (P)	6	3	1	2	17	10	+7	10	1–4		1–0	7–1
3	Americano	6	1	2	3	4	6	−2	5	0–1	2–2		1–0
4	Limoeiro	6	1	1	4	7	17	−10	4	2–0	1–5	1–1	

Source: rsssf.com
(P) Promoted to Série B 2005
