= Paulistano Futebol Clube =

Association football club in Brazil

Paulistano
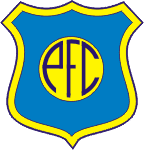
- Full name: Paulistano Futebol Clube
- Founded: August 7, 1982
- Ground: Estádio Ademir Cunha, Paulista, Pernambuco state, Brazil
- Capacity: 7,000
Home colours	Away colours

Paulistano Futebol Clube, commonly known as Paulistano, is a Brazilian football club based in Paulista, Pernambuco state. They competed in the Série C twice.

== History ==
The club was founded on August 7, 1982. Paulistano competed in the Série C in 1988, when they were eliminated in the Second Stage of the competition, and in 1993, when they were eliminated in the First Stage.

== Stadium ==
Paulistano Futebol Clube play their home games at Estádio Ademir Cunha. The stadium has a maximum capacity of 7,000 people.
