= Estádio Antônio Lins Ribeiro Guimarães =

Stadium in Santa Bárbara d'Oeste, Brazil

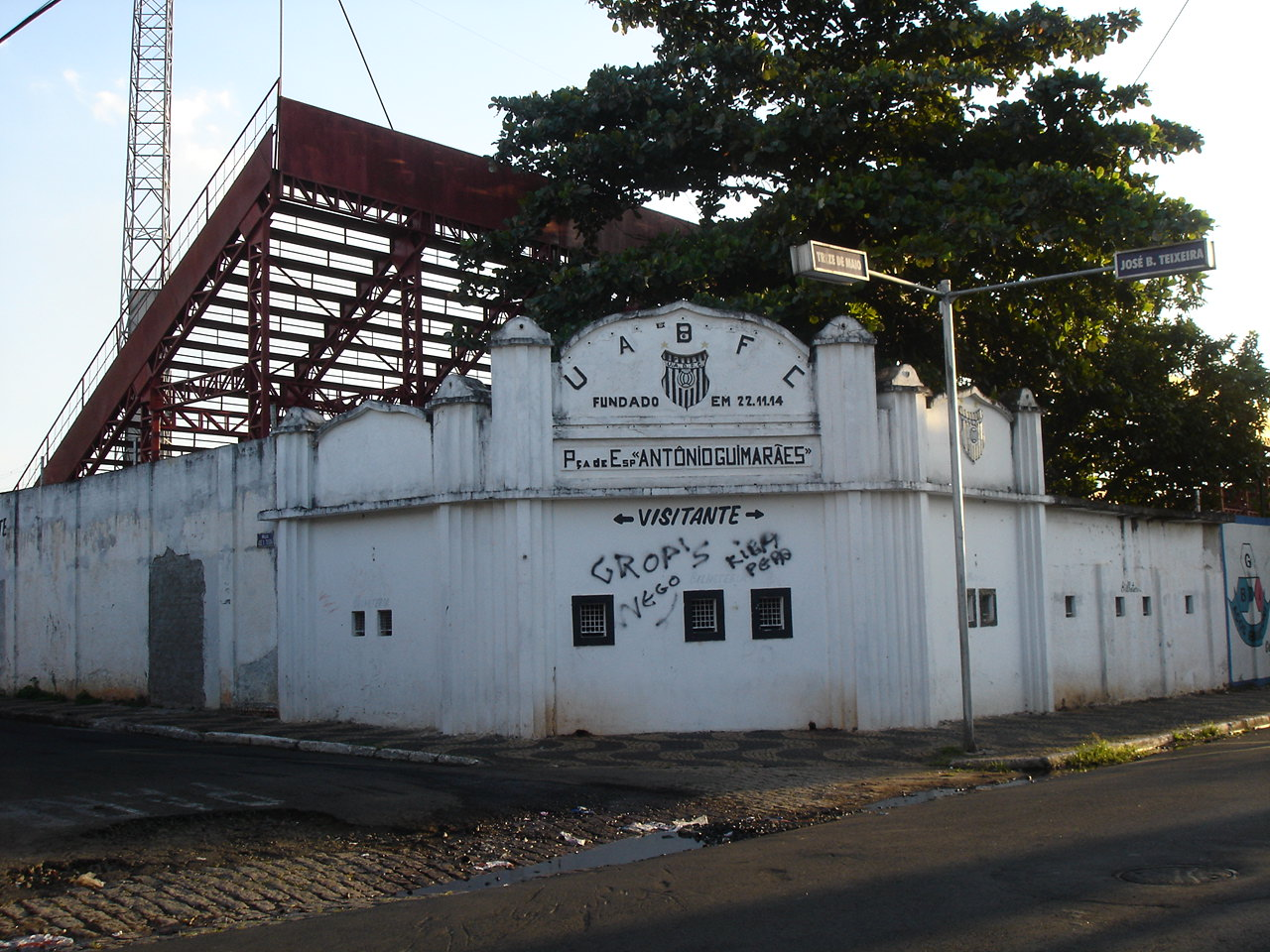
- Estádio Antônio R. Guimarães
- Interactive map of Estádio Antônio Lins Ribeiro Guimarães
- Address: Brazil
- Location: Santa Bárbara d'Oeste, São Paulo
- Coordinates: 22°45′19.71″S 47°25′28.12″W

Tenant
- União Agrícola Barbarense Futebol Clube

Estádio Antônio Lins Ribeiro Guimarães is a multi-use stadium located in Santa Bárbara d'Oeste, Brazil. It is used mostly for football matches and hosts the home matches of União Agrícola Barbarense Futebol Clube. The stadium has a maximum capacity of 15,000 people and was built in 1921.
