= 2003 Campeonato Brasileiro Série C =

Campeonato Brasileiro Série C
- Season: 2003
- Champions: Ituano
- Promoted: Ituano; Santo André
- Matches: 340
- Goals: 827 (2.43 per match)
- Top goalscorer: Nílson Sergipano (Botafogo-PB) - 11 goals

The football (soccer) Campeonato Brasileiro Série C 2003, the third level of Brazilian National League, was played from September 17 to December 7, 2003. The competition had 95 clubs and two of them were promoted to Série B.

Ituano finished the final phase group with most points and was declared 2003 Brazilian Série C champions, claiming the promotion to the 2004 Série B along with Santo André, the runners-up.

== Stages of the competition ==
=== First stage ===
Group 1 (AC-AM-RO)

Pos	Team	Pld	W	D	L	GF	GA	GD	Pts	Qualification
1	(Amazonas (Brazilian state)) Nacional-AM	6	4	2	0	11	5	+6	14	Qualified for second stage
2	(Acre (state)) Rio Branco-AC	6	3	2	1	9	6	+3	11	Qualified for second stage
3	(Amazonas (Brazilian state)) Rio Negro	6	1	1	4	10	12	−2	4	
4	(Rondônia) CFA	6	1	1	4	4	11	−7	4	

Group 2 (AP-PA-RO)

Pos	Team	Pld	W	D	L	GF	GA	GD	Pts	Qualification
1	Atlético Roraima	4	3	0	1	8	6	+2	9	Qualified for second stage
2	(Pará) Tuna Luso	4	2	1	1	4	2	+2	7	Qualified for second stage
3	(Amapá) Ypiranga	4	0	1	3	4	8	−4	1	

Group 3 (MA)

Pos	Team	Pld	W	D	L	GF	GA	GD	Pts	Qualification
1	(Maranhão) Viana	4	3	1	0	3	0	+3	10	Qualified for second stage
2	(Maranhão) Chapadinha	4	2	1	1	3	2	+1	7	Qualified for second stage
3	Maranhão	4	0	0	4	1	5	−4	0	

Group 4 (MA)

Pos	Team	Pld	W	D	L	GF	GA	GD	Pts	Qualification
1	(Maranhão) Imperatriz	4	3	0	1	6	3	+3	9	Qualified for second stage
2	(Maranhão) Sampaio Corrêa	4	1	1	2	3	4	−1	4	Qualified for second stage
3	(Maranhão) Santa Inês	4	1	1	2	4	6	−2	4	

Group 5 (MA-PI)

Pos	Team	Pld	W	D	L	GF	GA	GD	Pts	Qualification
1	(Piauí) Flamengo-PI	4	3	0	1	7	2	+5	9	Qualified for second stage
2	(Piauí) River	4	2	0	2	5	3	+2	6	Qualified for second stage
3	(Maranhão) Caxiense	4	1	0	3	1	8	−7	3	

Group 6 (CE)

Pos	Team	Pld	W	D	L	GF	GA	GD	Pts	Qualification
1	(Ceará) Itapipoca	4	2	1	1	5	6	−1	7	Qualified for second stage
2	(Ceará) Guarany de Sobral	4	1	3	0	4	1	+3	6	Qualified for second stage
3	(Ceará) Ferroviário-CE	4	0	2	2	4	6	−2	2	

Group 7 (PB-RN)

Pos	Team	Pld	W	D	L	GF	GA	GD	Pts	Qualification
1	(Rio Grande do Norte) ABC	4	2	1	1	4	4	0	7	Qualified for second stage
2	(Paraíba) Campinense	4	2	0	2	6	5	+1	6	Qualified for second stage
3	(Rio Grande do Norte) São Gonçalo	4	1	1	2	4	5	−1	4	

Group 8 (AL-PB-PE)

Pos	Team	Pld	W	D	L	GF	GA	GD	Pts	Qualification
1	(Paraíba) Treze	4	2	1	1	4	5	−1	7	Qualified for second stage
2	(Alagoas) ASA	4	1	2	1	4	4	0	5	Qualified for second stage
3	(Pernambuco) Central	4	1	1	2	6	5	+1	4	

Group 9 (AL-PB)

Pos	Team	Pld	W	D	L	GF	GA	GD	Pts	Qualification
1	(Paraíba) Botafogo-PB	4	3	0	1	6	3	+3	9	Qualified for second stage
2	(Paraíba) Sousa	4	3	0	1	4	2	+2	9	Qualified for second stage
3	(Alagoas) Corinthians-AL	4	0	0	4	1	6	−5	0	

Group 10 (AL-BA-SE)

Pos	Team	Pld	W	D	L	GF	GA	GD	Pts	Qualification
1	Sergipe	4	2	1	1	5	4	+1	7	Qualified for second stage
2	(Alagoas) CSA	4	1	2	1	8	8	0	5	Qualified for second stage
3	(Bahia) Catuense	4	1	1	2	6	7	−1	4	

Group 11 (BA-SE)

Pos	Team	Pld	W	D	L	GF	GA	GD	Pts	Qualification
1	(Bahia) Juazeiro	6	4	0	2	10	4	+6	12	Qualified for second stage
2	(Sergipe) Confiança	6	4	0	2	6	5	+1	12	Qualified for second stage
3	(Sergipe) Itabaiana	6	2	1	3	6	6	0	7	
4	(Sergipe) Lagartense	6	1	1	4	4	11	−7	4	

Group 12 (MS)

Pos	Team	Pld	W	D	L	GF	GA	GD	Pts	Qualification
1	(Mato Grosso do Sul) Comercial-MS	6	3	2	1	5	6	−1	11	Qualified for second stage
2	(Mato Grosso do Sul) CENE	6	2	3	1	4	3	+1	9	Qualified for second stage
3	(Mato Grosso do Sul) Operário-MS	6	2	2	2	6	5	+1	8	
4	(Mato Grosso do Sul) Taveirópolis	6	1	1	4	8	9	−1	4	

Group 13 (MT-MS)

Pos	Team	Pld	W	D	L	GF	GA	GD	Pts	Qualification
1	(Mato Grosso) Cuiabá	4	2	1	1	6	5	+1	7	Qualified for second stage
2	(Mato Grosso do Sul) Chapadão	4	1	2	1	2	1	+1	5	Qualified for second stage
3	(Mato Grosso) Jaciara	4	1	1	2	5	7	−2	4	

Group 14 (GO-TO)

Pos	Team	Pld	W	D	L	GF	GA	GD	Pts	Qualification
1	(Tocantins) Tocantinópolis	4	2	1	1	10	8	+2	7	Qualified for second stage
2	(Tocantins) Palmas	4	2	1	1	10	9	+1	7	Qualified for second stage
3	(Goiás) Anápolis	4	0	2	2	7	10	−3	2	

Group 15 (DF-GO)

Pos	Team	Pld	W	D	L	GF	GA	GD	Pts	Qualification
1	(Federal District (Brazil)) CFZ-DF	4	3	1	0	6	2	+4	10	Qualified for second stage
2	(Goiás) Atlético-GO	4	1	2	1	6	6	0	5	Qualified for second stage
3	(Goiás) Goiatuba	4	0	1	3	3	7	−4	1	

Group 16 (MG-SP)

Pos	Team	Pld	W	D	L	GF	GA	GD	Pts	Qualification
1	(Minas Gerais) Iuiutaba	4	2	1	1	5	5	0	7	Qualified for second stage
2	(Minas Gerais) Uberlândia	4	1	2	1	4	4	0	5	Qualified for second stage
3	(São Paulo (state)) Francana	4	1	1	2	4	4	0	4	

Group 17 (MG-SP)

Pos	Team	Pld	W	D	L	GF	GA	GD	Pts	Qualification
1	(São Paulo (state)) Bragantino	4	2	1	1	6	5	+1	7	Qualified for second stage
2	(Minas Gerais) Rio Branco-MG	4	2	0	2	6	5	+1	6	Qualified for second stage
3	(Minas Gerais) Uberaba	4	1	1	2	3	5	−2	4	

Group 18 (ES-MG)

Pos	Team	Pld	W	D	L	GF	GA	GD	Pts	Qualification
1	(Minas Gerais) Ipatinga	6	4	1	1	10	2	+8	13	Qualified for second stage
2	(Espírito Santo) Estrela do Norte	6	4	1	1	6	5	+1	13	Qualified for second stage
3	(Espírito Santo) Desportiva	6	2	1	3	9	9	0	7	
4	(Minas Gerais) Villa Nova	6	0	1	5	2	11	−9	1	

Group 19 (ES-MG-RJ)

Pos	Team	Pld	W	D	L	GF	GA	GD	Pts	Qualification
1	(Minas Gerais) Tupi	6	3	1	2	9	5	+4	10	Qualified for second stage
2	(Rio de Janeiro (state)) Goytacaz	6	3	1	2	8	6	+2	10	Qualified for second stage
3	(Espírito Santo) Rio Branco-ES	6	3	1	2	8	8	0	10	
4	(Espírito Santo) Serra	6	0	3	3	2	8	−6	3	

Group 20 (RJ)

Pos	Team	Pld	W	D	L	GF	GA	GD	Pts	Qualification
1	(Rio de Janeiro (state)) Americano	6	5	1	0	15	6	+9	16	Qualified for second stage
2	(Rio de Janeiro (state)) Macaé	6	3	1	2	7	6	+1	10	Qualified for second stage
3	(Rio de Janeiro (state)) Portuguesa-RJ	6	2	2	2	10	10	0	8	
4	(Rio de Janeiro (state)) Rio Branco-RJ	6	0	0	6	5	15	−10	0	

Group 21 (RJ)

Pos	Team	Pld	W	D	L	GF	GA	GD	Pts	Qualification
1	(Rio de Janeiro (state)) Cabofriense	6	3	2	1	9	6	+3	11	Qualified for second stage
2	(Rio de Janeiro (state)) Olaria	6	3	2	1	8	5	+3	11	Qualified for second stage
3	(Rio de Janeiro (state)) América-RJ	6	2	1	3	5	7	−2	7	
4	(Rio de Janeiro (state)) Bangu	6	0	3	3	4	8	−4	3	

Group 22 (RJ-SP)

Pos	Team	Pld	W	D	L	GF	GA	GD	Pts	Qualification
1	(Rio de Janeiro (state)) Friburguense	4	2	2	0	6	3	+3	8	Qualified for second stage
2	(Rio de Janeiro (state)) Volta Redonda	4	1	2	1	7	4	+3	5	Qualified for second stage
3	(São Paulo (state)) Portuguesa Santista	4	1	0	3	1	7	−6	3	

Group 23 (SP)

Pos	Team	Pld	W	D	L	GF	GA	GD	Pts	Qualification
1	(São Paulo (state)) Sertãozinho	4	2	2	0	7	4	+3	8	Qualified for second stage
2	(São Paulo (state)) Botafogo-SP	4	1	2	1	4	5	−1	5	Qualified for second stage
3	(São Paulo (state)) Comercial-SP	4	0	2	2	4	6	−2	2	

Group 24 (SP)

Pos	Team	Pld	W	D	L	GF	GA	GD	Pts	Qualification
1	(São Paulo (state)) Atlético Sorocaba	4	3	0	1	5	1	+4	9	Qualified for second stage
2	(São Paulo (state)) Santo André	4	1	1	2	3	4	−1	4	Qualified for second stage
3	(São Paulo (state)) Rio Branco-SP	4	1	1	2	2	5	−3	4	

Group 25 (SP)

Pos	Team	Pld	W	D	L	GF	GA	GD	Pts	Qualification
1	(São Paulo (state)) Internacional de Limeira	4	2	1	1	5	3	+2	7	Qualified for second stage
2	(São Paulo (state)) Ituano	4	2	0	2	3	4	−1	6	Qualified for second stage
3	(São Paulo (state)) XV de Piracicaba	4	1	1	2	2	3	−1	4	

Group 26 (PR-SP)

Pos	Team	Pld	W	D	L	GF	GA	GD	Pts	Qualification
1	(São Paulo (state)) União Barbarense	6	3	3	0	8	4	+4	12	Qualified for second stage
2	(Paraná (state)) União Bandeirante	6	3	2	1	6	5	+1	11	Qualified for second stage
3	(Paraná (state)) Grêmio Maringá	6	1	2	3	7	8	−1	5	
4	(Paraná (state)) Iraty	6	1	1	4	5	9	−4	4	

Group 27 (RS-SC)

Pos	Team	Pld	W	D	L	GF	GA	GD	Pts	Qualification
1	(Santa Catarina (state)) Caxias-SC	4	1	3	0	6	5	+1	6	Qualified for second stage
2	(Rio Grande do Sul) Ulbra	4	0	4	0	4	4	0	4	Qualified for second stage
3	(Santa Catarina (state)) Marcílio Dias	4	0	3	1	3	4	−1	3	

Group 28 (RS)

Pos	Team	Pld	W	D	L	GF	GA	GD	Pts	Qualification
1	(Rio Grande do Sul) RS Futebol	6	4	1	1	14	6	+8	13	Qualified for second stage
2	(Rio Grande do Sul) Pelotas	6	3	2	1	5	6	−1	11	Qualified for second stage
3	(Rio Grande do Sul) São José-RS	6	2	1	3	5	7	−2	7	
4	(Rio Grande do Sul) Brasil de Pelotas	6	0	2	4	7	12	−5	2	

Source: rsssf.com

=== Second stage ===
[

Team 1	Agg.	Team 2	1st leg	2nd leg
Tuna Luso	1–0	Nacional-AM	1–0	0–0
Atlético-GO	3–3(p)	Ituiutaba	2–1	1–2
Rio Branco-MG	4–1	Ipatinga	1–1	3–0
Santo André	6–3	Sertãozinho	4–0	2–3
Sampaio Corrêa	1–3	Viana	1–1	0–2
Chapadinha	2–3	Imperatriz	1–1	1–2
Guarany de Sobral	4–3	Flamengo-PI	3–2	1–1
River	0–1	Itapipoca	0–0	0–1
Campinense	4–2	Treze	3–0	1–2
ASA	3–2	ABC	3–2	0–0
CSA	3–4	Botafogo-PB	1–2	2–2
Sousa	3–5	Sergipe	3–2	0–3
CENE	2–2(p)	Juazeiro	2–0	0–2
Palmas	4–1	Cuiabá	1–0	3–1
Chapadão	3–3(a)	Tocantinópolis	1–0	2–3
Uberlândia	0–6	CFZ-DF	0–3	0–3
Estrela do Norte	2–4	Bragantino	2–2	0–2
Macaé	2–3	Tupi	1–1	1–2
Goytacaz	1–0	Americano	1–0	annulled
Volta Redonda	0–1	Cabofriense	0–1	0–0
Olaria	2–0	Friburguense	1–0	1–0
Botafogo-SP	3–1	Atlético Sorocaba	2–0	1–1
União Bandeirante	2–1	Internacional de Limeira	2–0	0–1
Pelotas	5–5(a)	Caxias-SC	3–1	2–4
Ulbra	1–3	RS Futebol	0–1	1–2
Rio Branco-AC	3–1	Atlético Roraima	1–0	2–1
Ituano	3–3(a)	União Barbarense	2–0	1–3
Confiança	4–1	Comercial-MS	3–1	1–0

=== Third stage ===
Team 1	Agg.	Team 2	1st leg	2nd leg
Tuna Luso	2–0	Rio Branco-AC	2–0	0–0
Imperatriz	5–3	Viana	3–1	2–2
Guarany de Sobral	2–4	Itapipoca	1–3	1–1
ASA	0-3	Campinense	0-1	0-2
Sergipe	2–4	Botafogo-PB	0–0	2–4
Palmas	2-2 (a)	Chapadão	0–0	2–2
CFZ-DF	3–1	Ituiutaba	1–1	2–0
Bragantino	3-1	Rio Branco-MG	1–0	2-1
Olaria	3–4	Cabofriense	1–3	2–1
Santo André	4-1	Botafogo-SP	4-0	0-1
Ituano	4-2	União Bandeirante	3-2	1-0
RS Futebol	1-0	Pelotas	1–0	0-0
Tupi	5-3	Americano	5-2	0-1
CENE	2–2(p)	Confiança	2–0	0–2

=== Fourth stage ===
Team 1	Agg.	Team 2	1st leg	2nd leg
Tuna Luso	2-1	Imperatriz	2–0	0-1
Campinense	2-2(a)	Itapipoca	1-0	1-2
Palmas	2-0	CFZ-DF	1–0	1–0
Bragantino	3-2	Tupi	3-1	0-1
Cabofriense	3-3(p)	Santo André	1-2	2-1
Ituano	4-4(p)	RS Futebol	3-1	1-3
Botafogo-PB	6-1	Confiança	2-0	4-1

=== Fifth stage ===
Team 1	Agg.	Team 2	1st leg	2nd leg
Campinense	7-2	Tuna Luso	4-1	3-1
Botafogo-PB	6-4	Palmas	5-2	1-2
Santo André	5-4	Bragantino	4-1	1–3
RS Futebol	3-4	Ituano	2-1	1-3

=== Final stage ===
Pos	Team	Pld	W	D	L	GF	GA	GD	Pts	ITU	SAD	BPB	CPN
1	Ituano (P)	6	3	2	1	9	7	+2	11		2–1	2–1	1–0
2	Santo André (P)	6	3	1	2	7	5	+2	10	0–0		0–1	1–0
3	Botafogo-PB	6	2	1	3	8	12	−4	7	4–4	1–3		1–0
4	Campinense	6	2	0	4	5	5	0	6	1–0	1–2	3–0	

Source: rsssf.com
(P) Promoted to Série B 2004

== Sources ==
- rsssf.com
