= 1991 Campeonato Brasileiro Série B =

Campeonato Brasileiro Série B
- Season: 1991
- Champions: Paysandu
- Promoted: Paysandu; Guarani
- Goals scored: 997
- Average goals/game: 2,09
- Top goalscorer: Cacaio (Paysandu)
- Biggest home win: Novorizontino 7-0 Taguatinga
- Biggest away win: Auto Esporte-PI 1-6 ABC

The football (soccer) Campeonato Brasileiro Série B 1991, the second level of Brazilian National League, was played from February to May 1991. The competition had 64 clubs and two of them were promoted to Série A. The competition was won by Paysandu.

== First phase ==
=== Group 1 ===
Pos	Team	Pld	W	D	L	GF	GA	GD	Pts	Qualification
1	(Maranhão) Sampaio Corrêa	14	11	1	2	18	6	+12	23	Qualified
2	(Pará) Paysandu	14	10	3	1	27	8	+19	23	Qualified
3	(Pará) Remo	14	8	3	3	18	7	+11	19	
4	(Pará) Tuna Luso	14	6	4	4	13	12	+1	16	
5	Maranhão	14	4	1	9	15	20	−5	9	
6	(Acre (state)) Rio Branco-AC	14	1	6	7	7	19	−12	8	
7	(Amazonas (Brazilian state)) Rio Negro	14	2	3	9	11	21	−10	7	
8	(Acre (state)) Independência	14	1	5	8	6	22	−16	7	

=== Group 2 ===
Pos	Team	Pld	W	D	L	GF	GA	GD	Pts	Qualification
1	Ceará	14	6	7	1	14	4	+10	19	Qualified
2	(Rio Grande do Norte) ABC	14	4	10	0	20	10	+10	18	Qualified
3	(Ceará) Fortaleza	14	5	7	2	17	11	+6	17	
4	(Rio Grande do Norte) América-RN	14	4	7	3	16	17	−1	15	
5	(Piauí) Auto Esporte-PI	14	7	0	7	18	19	−1	14	
6	(Ceará) Ferroviário	14	3	6	5	10	11	−1	12	
7	(Piauí) Parnahyba	14	2	5	7	13	28	−15	9	
8	(Maranhão) Moto Club	14	2	4	8	15	23	−8	8	

=== Group 3 ===
Pos	Team	Pld	W	D	L	GF	GA	GD	Pts	Qualification
1	(Pernambuco) Santa Cruz	14	8	5	1	22	6	+16	21	Qualified
2	(Alagoas) CSA	14	6	5	3	13	8	+5	17	Qualified
3	(Pernambuco) Central	14	4	8	2	10	7	+3	16	
4	(Paraíba) Auto Esporte-PB	14	3	8	3	13	11	+2	14	
5	(Pernambuco) Estudantes	14	4	5	5	11	16	−5	14 (Note: 1 bonus point?)	
6	(Paraíba) Treze	14	3	6	5	10	12	−2	12	
7	(Alagoas) CRB	14	2	7	5	10	20	−10	11	
8	(Pernambuco) América-PE	14	1	6	7	4	13	−9	8	

=== Group 4 ===
Pos	Team	Pld	W	D	L	GF	GA	GD	Pts	Qualification
1	(Rio de Janeiro (state)) Americano	14	8	3	3	17	9	+8	19	Qualified
2	(Espírito Santo) Desportiva	14	8	3	3	21	20	+1	19	Qualified
3	(Rio de Janeiro (state)) Itaperuna	14	6	2	6	14	13	+1	14	
4	(Bahia) Catuense	14	5	4	5	18	14	+4	14	
5	(Espírito Santo) Colatina	14	5	4	5	17	19	−2	14	
6	(Rio de Janeiro (state)) América-RJ	14	3	5	6	13	15	−2	11	
7	(Bahia) Fluminense de Feira	14	3	5	6	14	20	−6	11	
8	(Sergipe) Confiança	14	2	6	6	11	15	−4	10	

=== Group 5 ===
Pos	Team	Pld	W	D	L	GF	GA	GD	Pts	Qualification
1	(São Paulo (state)) Novorizontino	14	7	5	2	26	12	+14	19	Qualified
2	(São Paulo (state)) Guarani	14	6	6	2	19	11	+8	18	Qualified
3	(Goiás) Anapolina	14	5	7	2	17	16	+1	17	
4	(Goiás) Goiânia	14	3	7	4	20	20	0	13	
5	(Federal District (Brazil)) Gama	14	4	4	6	18	20	−2	12	
6	(Federal District (Brazil)) Taguatinga	14	4	4	6	14	22	−8	12	
7	(Goiás) Atlético-GO	14	3	6	5	12	16	−4	12	
8	(Goiás) Vila Nova	14	1	7	6	6	15	−9	9	

=== Group 6 ===
Pos	Team	Pld	W	D	L	GF	GA	GD	Pts	Qualification
1	(São Paulo (state)) Botafogo-SP	14	8	5	1	18	6	+12	21	Qualified
2	(São Paulo (state)) Noroeste	14	8	2	4	23	15	+8	18	Qualified
3	(São Paulo (state)) Ponte Preta	14	5	6	3	13	8	+5	16	
4	(Minas Gerais) América-MG	14	3	7	4	14	16	−2	13	
5	(São Paulo (state)) Inter de Limeira	14	3	7	4	12	15	−3	13	
6	(São Paulo (state)) XV de Piracicaba	14	3	5	6	10	17	−7	11	
7	(Minas Gerais) Esportivo de Passos	14	2	7	5	6	11	−5	11	
8	(Minas Gerais) Rio Branco de Andradas	14	2	5	7	10	18	−8	9	

=== Group 7 ===
Pos	Team	Pld	W	D	L	GF	GA	GD	Pts	Qualification
1	(Paraná (state)) Londrina	14	8	5	1	26	14	+12	21	Qualified
2	(Rio de Janeiro (state)) Bangu	14	6	5	3	13	9	+4	17	Qualified
3	(São Paulo (state)) Juventus	14	4	9	1	14	12	+2	17	
4	(Paraná (state)) Operário-PR	14	5	4	5	21	18	+3	14	
5	(Rio de Janeiro (state)) Campo Grande	14	4	6	4	14	14	0	14	
6	(Paraná (state)) Grêmio Maringá	14	3	8	3	14	14	0	14	
7	(São Paulo (state)) São José	14	2	4	8	12	12	0	8	
8	(Mato Grosso do Sul) Ubiratan	14	1	5	8	12	22	−10	7	

=== Group 8 ===
Pos	Team	Pld	W	D	L	GF	GA	GD	Pts	Qualification
1	(Paraná (state)) Coritiba	14	7	4	3	23	12	+11	18	Qualified
2	(Paraná (state)) Paraná	14	6	5	3	15	7	+8	17	Qualified
3	(Santa Catarina (state)) Joinville	14	5	6	3	16	15	+1	16	
4	(Santa Catarina (state)) Figueirense	14	3	8	3	8	10	−2	14	
5	(Santa Catarina (state)) Criciúma	14	5	3	6	22	16	+6	13	
6	(Rio Grande do Sul) Caxias	14	4	5	5	14	19	−5	13	
7	(Rio Grande do Sul) Juventude	14	4	5	5	10	15	−5	13	
8	(Santa Catarina (state)) Blumenau	14	1	6	7	8	22	−14	8	

== Second phase ==
Team 1	Agg.	Team 2	1st leg	2nd leg
ABC	0-0(p)	Sampaio Corrêa	0-0	0-0
Paysandu	2-1	Ceará	1-0	1-1
Desportiva	2-7	Santa Cruz	2-3	0-4
CSA	0-4	Americano	0-0	0-4
Noroeste	4-2	Novorizontino	4-0	0-2
Guarani	1-1 (a)	Botafogo-SP	0-0	1-1
Bangu	2-5	Coritiba	2-4	0-1
Paraná	2-1	Londrina	1-0	1-1

== Quarterfinals ==
Team 1	Agg.	Team 2	1st leg	2nd leg
ABC	2-3	Paysandu	1-0	1-3
Americano	3-3(a)	Santa Cruz	1-0	2-3
Guarani	3-3(a)	Noroeste	1-0	2-3
Paraná	1-4	Coritiba	1-0	0-4

== Semifinals ==
Team 1	Agg.	Team 2	1st leg	2nd leg
Americano	1-1(p)	Paysandu	1-0	0-1
Coritiba	1-1(p)	Guarani	1-0	0-1

== Final ==
May 19, 1991

Guarani	1–0	Paysandu

Brinco de Ouro

May 26, 1991

Paysandu	2–0	Guarani

Mangueirão

== Sources ==
- "Brazil Second Level 1991". rsssfbrasil.com.
