= Associação Atlética Colatina =

Colatina
- Full name: Associação Atlética Colatina
- Founded: May 13, 1978
- Dissolved: 1996
- Ground: Estádio Municipal Justiniano de Melo e Silva, Colatina, Espírito Santo state, Brazil
- Capacity: 12,000
Home colours	Away colours

Associação Atlética Colatina, commonly known as Colatina, was a Brazilian football club based in Colatina, Espírito Santo state.

== History ==
The club was founded on May 13, 1978. They finished in the third position in the Campeonato Capixaba in 1978, being invited into the 1979 Campeonato Brasileiro Série A.The team participated in the Group B, being eliminated in the first phase and finishing the championship in 89th place out of 94 clubs. Later the team participated in the Campeonato Brasileiro Série B three times (1982, 1989 and 1991), in the Campeonato Brasileiro Série C three times (1981, 1990 and 1996), and won the 1990 Campeonato Capixaba, qualifying to the 1991 Copa do Brasil, where the club was eliminated by Santa Cruz in the first phase.

== Honours ==
- Campeonato Capixaba
  - Winners (1): 1990

== Stadium ==
Colatina played their home games at Estádio Municipal Justiniano de Melo e Silva. The stadium has a maximum capacity of 12,000 people.
