= Clube Esportivo Passense de Futebol e Cultura =

Passense
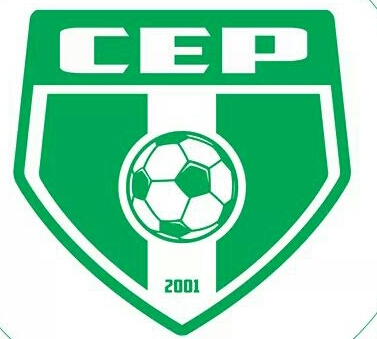
- Full name: Clube Esportivo Passense de Futebol e Cultura
- Founded: January 23, 2001
- Ground: Estádio Municipal Starling Soares, Passos, Minas Gerais state, Brazil
- Capacity: 12,000
Home colours	Away colours

Clube Esportivo Passense de Futebol e Cultura, commonly known as Passense, is a Brazilian football club based in Passos, Minas Gerais state.

== History ==
The club was founded on January 23, 2001, after political conflicts in the city of Passos, by former members of Clube Esportivo de Futebol. The club joined a partnership in 2007 with Passos City Hall and Clube Atlético Mineiro to compete in the Campeonato Mineiro Módulo II.

== Stadium ==
Clube Esportivo Passense de Futebol e Cultura play their home games at Estádio Soares de Azevedo. The stadium has a maximum capacity of 12,000 people.
