= Edmar (footballer, born 1960) =

Brazilian footballer

Personal information
- Full name: Edmar Bernardes dos Santos
- Date of birth: 20 January 1960 (age 66)
- Place of birth: Araxá, Brazil
- Height: 1.75 m (5 ft 9 in)
- Position: Forward

Senior career*
Years	Team	Apps	(Gls)
1977–1979	Brasília	34	(4)
1980	Cruzeiro	11	(8)
1980–1981	Taubaté		
1981–1982	Cruzeiro	25	(11)
1982–1983	Grêmio		
1983–1984	Flamengo	17	(2)
1985–1986	Guarani	26	(20)
1987–1988	Corinthians	36	(18)
1988–1991	Pescara	52	(6)
1991	Atlético Mineiro	14	(3)
1992	Santos FC		
1993	Rio Branco		
1994	Guarani	10	(0)
1995–1997	Brummel Sendai	27	(14)
1998	Campinas		

International career
1988	Brazil	6	(3)
Medal record
Men's football
Representing Brazil
Olympic Games
Silver medal – second place	1988 Seoul	Team competition
- * Club domestic league appearances and goals

Edmar Bernardes dos Santos (born 20 January 1960 in Araxá, Brazil), or simply Edmar, is a Brazilian former footballer who played as a forward for the Brazil national team. He won the silver medal at the 1988 Summer Olympics with Brazil.

== Honours ==
=== Individual ===
- Brazilian Championship Top Scorer: 1985
- São Paulo State Championship Top Scorer: 1980, 1987
