= Rio Branco de Andradas Futebol Clube =

Brazilian football club

Rio Branco de Andradas
- Full name: Rio Branco de Andradas Futebol Clube
- Nickname(s): Azulão da Mantiqueira; O Mais Querido
- Founded: June 13, 1948
- Ground: Estádio Parque do Azulão, Andradas, Minas Gerais state, Brazil
- Capacity: 6,000
- Website: http://www.riobranco-andradas.com.br/clube.php
Home colours	Away colours

Rio Branco de Andradas Futebol Clube, commonly known as Rio Branco de Andradas, is a Brazilian football club based in Andradas, Minas Gerais state. They competed in the Série B and in the Série C twice.

== History ==
The club was founded on June 13, 1948. They competed in the Série B in 1989, when they were eliminated in the First Stage, 1991, and in the Série C in 1992 and in 2003. Rio Branco de Andradas won the Campeonato Mineiro Módulo II in 1998, and in 2006.

== Honours ==
- Campeonato Mineiro Módulo II
  - Winners (3): 1994, 1998, 2006
- Campeonato Mineiro do Interior
  - Winners (2): 1990, 1992

== Stadium ==
Rio Branco de Andradas Futebol Clube play their home games at Estádio Parque do Azulão. The stadium has a maximum capacity of 6,000 people.
