= Inhapim =

- Municipality
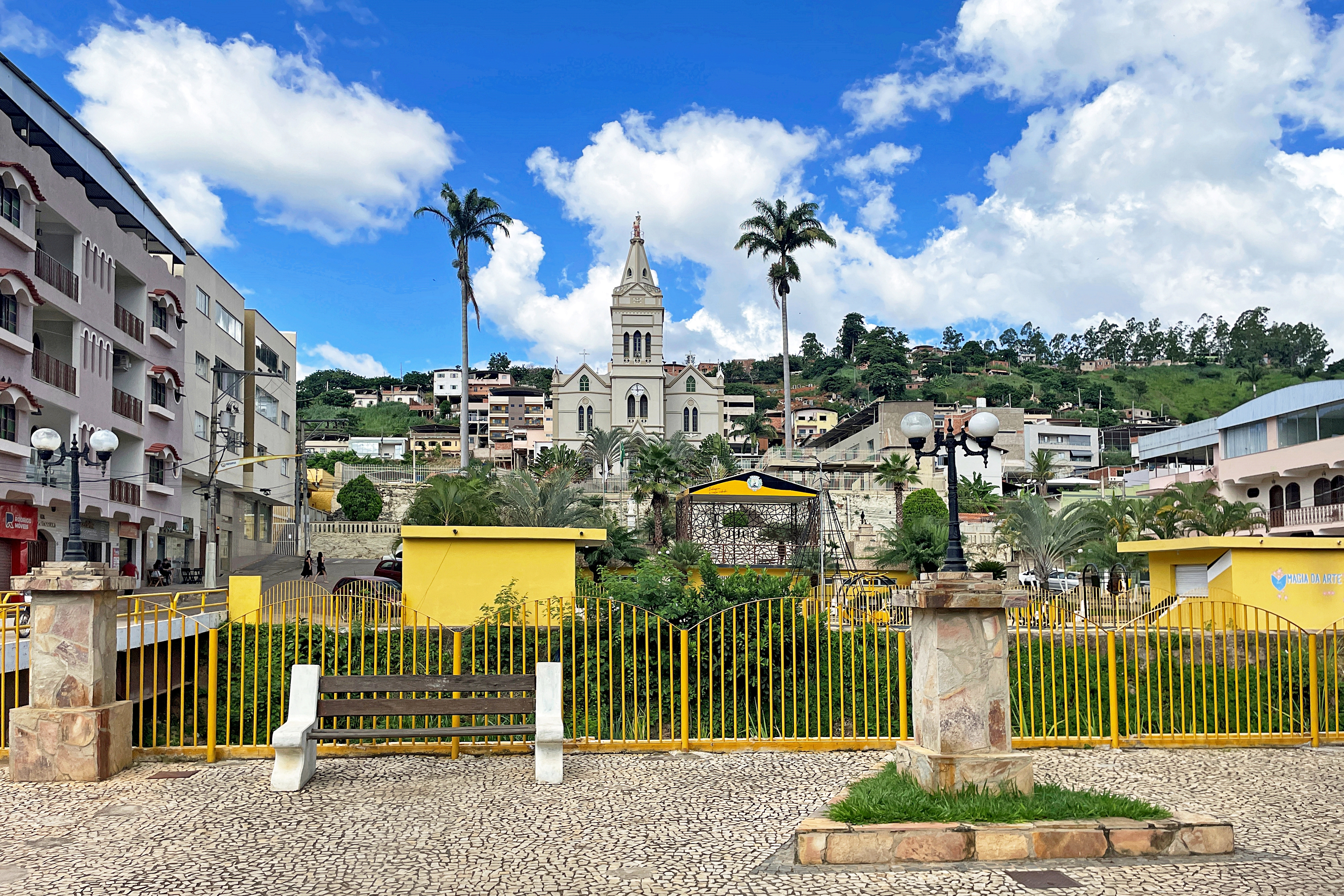
- Geraldo Homem de Faria Square with the Saint Sebastian Matriz Church in the background

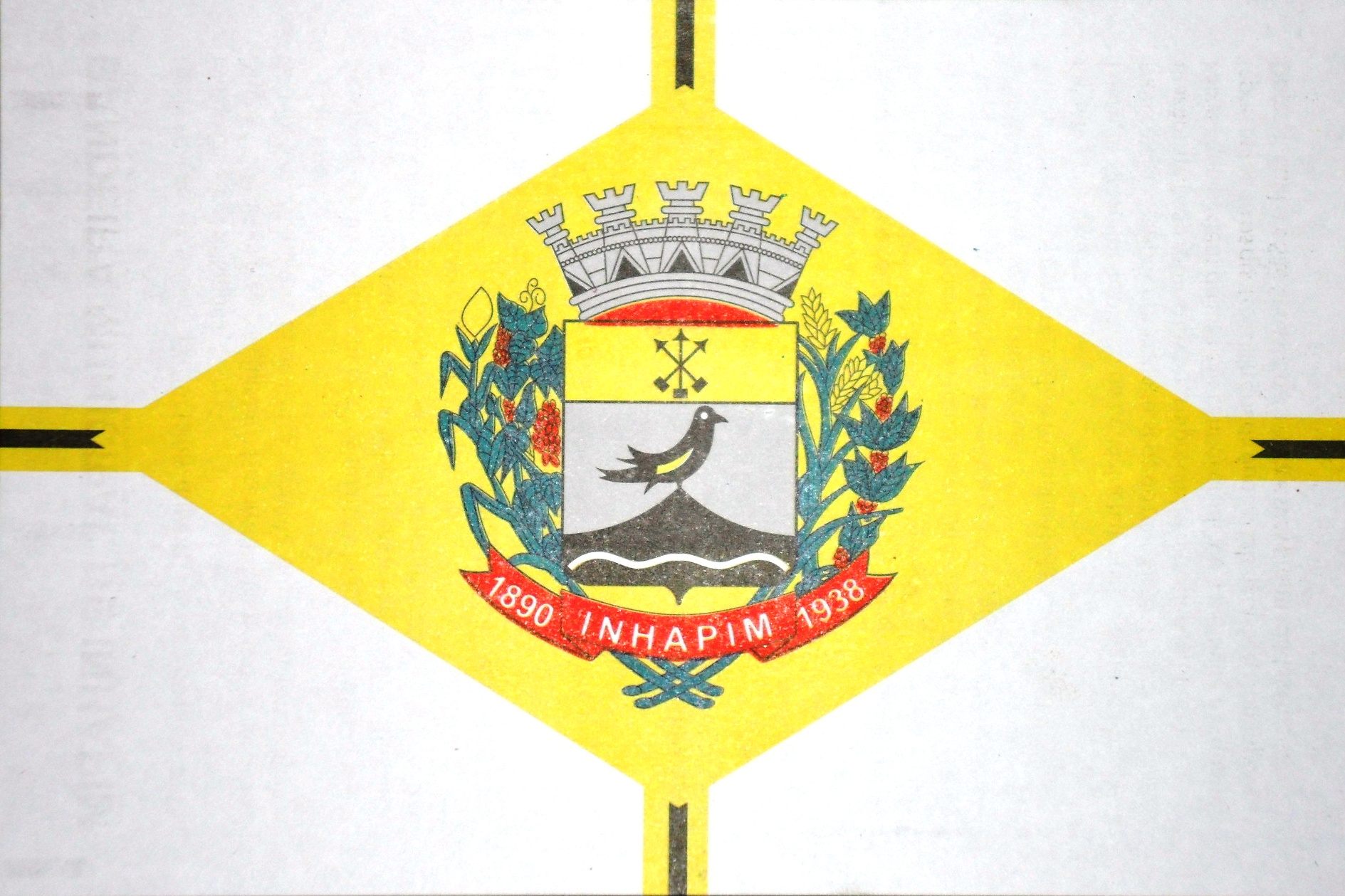
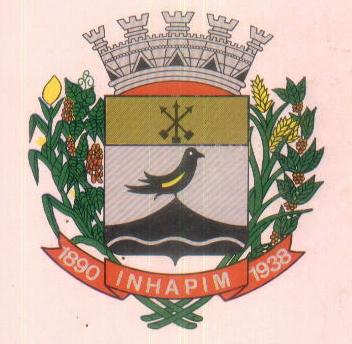
- Flag Coat of arms

- Location in Brazil
- Coordinates: 19°33′S 42°7′W
- Country: Brazil
- Region: Southeast
- State: Minas Gerais

Area
  - Total: 858 km^{2} (331 sq mi)

Population (2020)
  - Total: 24,079
  - Density: 28.1/km^{2} (72.7/sq mi)
- Time zone: UTC−3 (BRT)

Inhapim is a city in Minas Gerais, Brazil. Its population was 24,079 (2020) and its area is 858 km^{2}.

== See also ==
- List of municipalities in Minas Gerais
