= Associação Desportiva Limoeiro Futebol Clube =

Limoeiro
- Full name: Associação Desportiva Limoeiro Futebol Clube
- Nickname(s): Jaguar do Vale
- Founded: February 1, 2001
- Ground: Bandeirão, Limoeiro do Norte, Ceará state, Brazil
- Capacity: 5,000
- President: José Ivan Lima Nobre
Home colours	Away colours

Associação Desportiva Limoeiro Futebol Clube, commonly known as Limoeiro, is a Brazilian football club based in Limoeiro do Norte, Ceará state. They competed in the Série C once.

== History ==
=== Foundation ===
The club was founded on February 1, 2001. Limoeiro won the Campeonato Cearense Second Division in 2001 and in 2009. They competed in the Série C in 2004, when they reached the Final Stage of the competition, finishing in the fourth place, and thus failing to gain promotion to the following year's Série B.

== Honours ==
- Campeonato Cearense Série B
  - Winners (2): 2001, 2009

== Stadium ==
Associação Desportiva Limoeiro Futebol Clube play their home games at Estádio José de Oliveira Bandeira, nicknamed Bandeirão. The stadium has a maximum capacity of 5,000 people.
