= Ubiratan Esporte Clube =

Ubiratan
- Full name: Ubiratan Esporte Clube
- Nickname(s): Leão da fronteira
- Founded: February 5, 1947
- Ground: Estádio Fredis Saldívar, Dourados, Mato Grosso do Sul state, Brazil
- Capacity: 5,000
Home colors	Away colors

Ubiratan Esporte Clube, commonly known as Ubiratan, is a Brazilian football club based in Dourados, Mato Grosso do Sul state. They won the Campeonato Sul-Matogrossense three times, competed in the Série B twice and also competed in the Série C three times.

== History ==
The club was founded on February 5, 1947. Ubiratan competed in the Série B in 1986, when they were eliminated in the First Stage. The club was eliminated in the Second Stage in the 1988 Série C, and in the First Stage in the 1990 edition of this competition. They won the Campeonato Sul-Matogrossense in 1990, 1998, and in 1999. Ubiratan was eliminated in the First Stage in both the 1991 Série B and in the 1998 Série C.

== Stadium ==
Ubiratan Esporte Clube play their home games at Estádio Fredis Saldívar, nicknamed Douradão. The stadium has a maximum capacity of 5,000 people.

== Honours ==
- Campeonato Sul-Matogrossense:
  - Winners (3): 1990, 1998, 1999
  - Runners-up (2): 1988, 2000
