= Estrela do Norte Futebol Clube =

Brazilian football club

Estrela do Norte
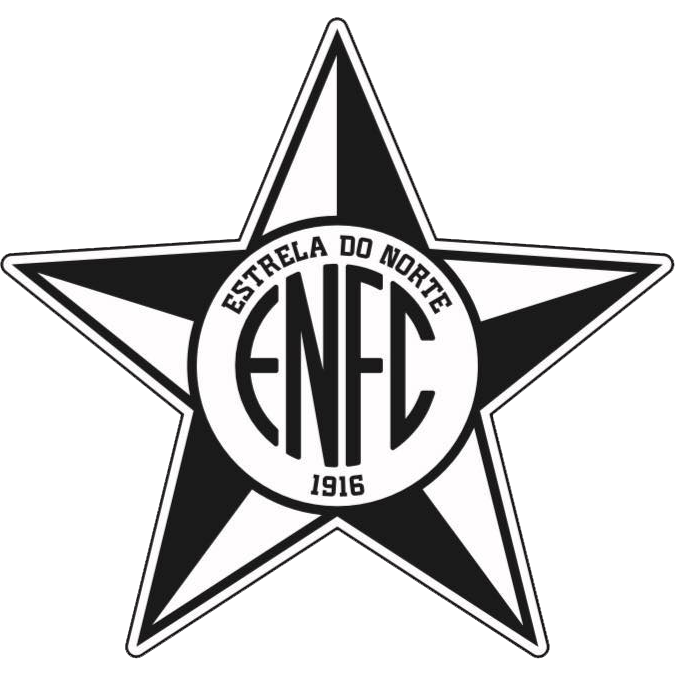
- Full name: Estrela do Norte Futebol Clube
- Nicknames: Estrelense; Alvinegro do Sumaré; Gigante do Sul
- Founded: 16 January 1916; 110 years ago
- Ground: Estádio Mário Monteiro
- Capacity: 6,000
Home colours	Away colours

Estrela do Norte Futebol Clube is a Brazilian football club based in Cachoeiro do Itapemirim, Espírito Santo. Competes in the Campeonato Capixaba, the Espírito Santo premier state league. It plays it home games in Estádio Mário Monteiro, for 6,000 spectators.

Estrela do Norte won the Campeonato Capixaba in 2014, the Campeonato Capixaba Série B in 1996, 1999 and 2026, and the Copa ES in 2003, 2004 and 2005.

Estrela do Norte competed in the Campeonato Brasileiro Série B in 1987, in the Série C in 1995, 1996, 2001, 2003, 2004, 2005, and in 2006, and in the Série D in 2014. They competed in the Copa do Brasil in 2005 and in 2006, being eliminated in the first round in both editions.

== History ==
The club was founded on January 1, 1916. The team's first field was the courtyard of the Liceu Muniz Freire school, and because it was located in the northern part of the city, the team was named Estrela do Norte (North Star). In the 1930s, the club moved its field to the Sumaré neighborhood.

== Stadium ==
Estrela do Norte Futebol Clube play their home games at Estádio Mário Monteiro, nicknamed as "Sumaré" due to its location in the neighborhood of the same name. The stadium has a maximum capacity of 6,000 people.

== Honours ==
- Campeonato Capixaba
  - Winners (1): 2014
  - Runners-up (5): 1987, 2001, 2004, 2005, 2006
- Copa ES
  - Winners (3): 2003, 2004, 2005
  - Runners-up (1): 2006
- Campeonato Capixaba Série B
  - Winners (3): 1996, 1999, 2026
  - Runners-up (2): 2010, 2018
