= Andradas =

Municipality in Minas Gerais, Brazil

Coordinates: 22°04′04″S 46°34′08″W

- Municipality
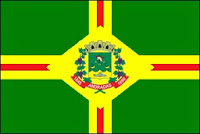
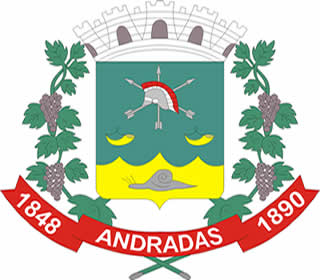
- Flag Coat of arms
- Interactive map of Andradas
- Country: Brazil
- State: Minas Gerais
- Region: Southeast
- Time zone: UTC−3 (BRT)

Location of Andradas within Minas Gerais

Andradas is a Brazilian municipality in the state of Minas Gerais. As of 2020 its population is estimated to be 41,396. It is known as "Land of Wine", thanks to Italian immigrants who brought viticulture to the city. It is also known for extreme sports like paragliding, hang-gliding, parachute, and more. Every year athletes from all over the world go to city practice their sport.

== See also ==
- List of municipalities in Minas Gerais
