= União Agrícola Barbarense Futebol Clube =

União Barbarense
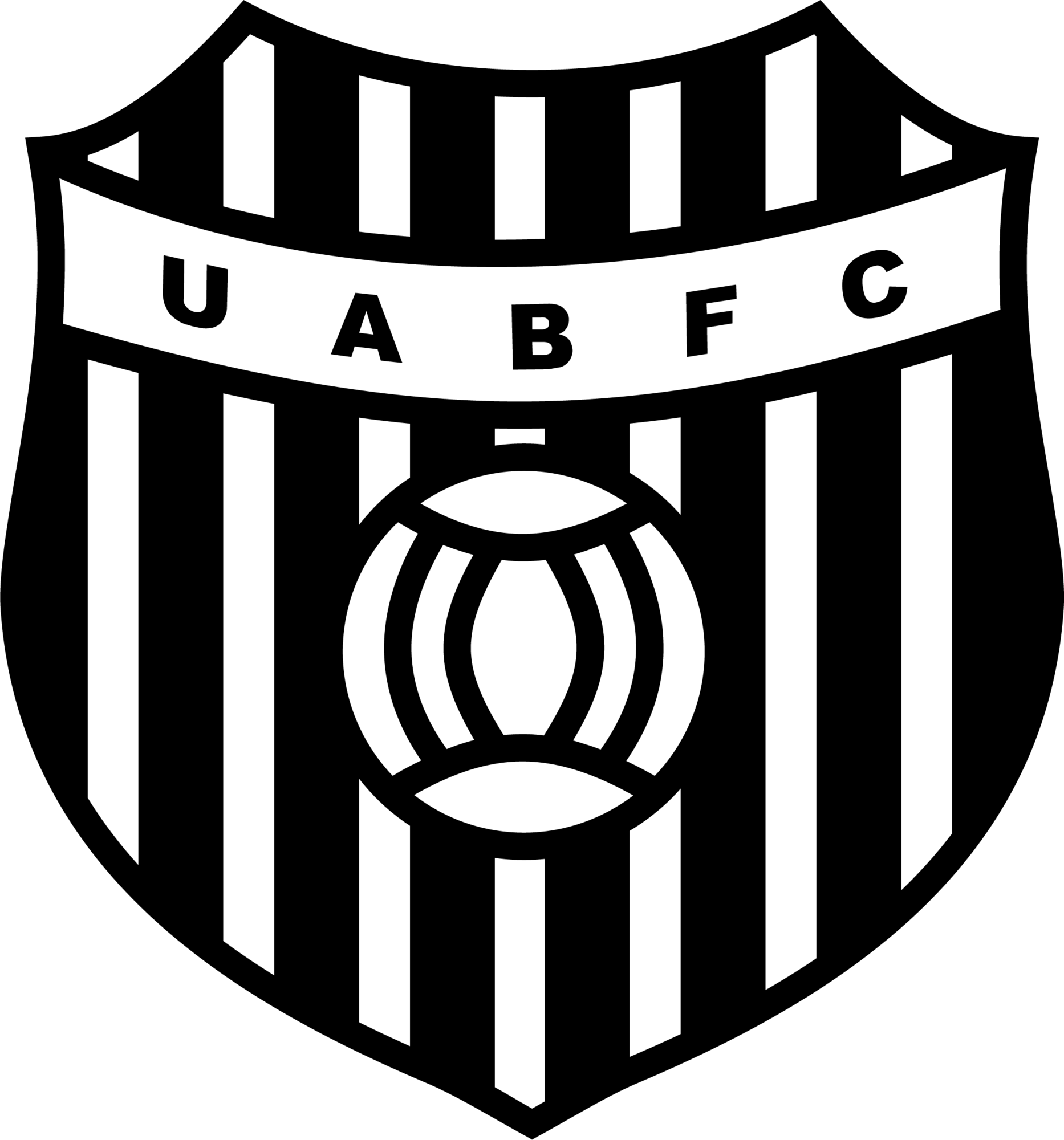
- Full name: União Agrícola Barbarense Futebol Clube
- Nicknames: Leão da 13 (English: 13th St. Lion)
- Founded: 22 November 1914; 111 years ago
- Ground: Toca do Leão
- Capacity: 15,000
- President: Daniel de Castro
- Head coach: Raphael Pereira
- League: Campeonato Paulista Série A3
- 2025: Paulista Série A4, 1st of 16 (champions)
Home colours	Away colours

União Agrícola Barbarense Futebol Clube, or simply União Barbarense, is a Brazilian football team based in Santa Bárbara d'Oeste, São Paulo. Founded on 22 November 1914, it plays in Campeonato Paulista Segunda Divisão.

Home stadium is the Antônio R. Guimarães stadium, capacity 15,000.

The club's home colours are white and black and the team mascot is a lion.

== History ==
On November 14, 1914, the club was founded. On May 22, 1921, União Barbarense's stadium was inaugurated. In 1921, the team affiliated to APEA (Associação Paulista de Esportes Atléticos, "Paulista Association of Athletic Sports") and played their first match in São Paulo State's Campeonato Oficial de Futebol Amador (Amateur Football Official Championship"). In 1948, the club was Amateur FPF (Federação Paulista de Futebol) champion of its Region.

In 1956, União Barbarense took a leave of FPF's Championship. In 1957, the club was Amateur champion of Liga Barbarense de Futebol ("Barbarense Football League")'s Barbarense Championship. In 1961, União Barbarense was amateur champion of Liga Barbarense de Futebol's Taça Cidade. In 1963, the team was amateur champion of the last edition of Liga Barbarense de Futebol's Taça Cidade.

In 1964, the club affiliated to FPF, became a professional club and competed in the Campeonato Paulista. In 1966, União Barbarense was promoted to Campeonato Paulista Second Division. In 1967, the club was promoted to Campeonato Paulista First Division, just one division below the Special Division. In 1968, União Barbarense competed in the Campeonato Paulista First Division.

In 1972, the club took a leave of FPF's Championship, returning in the following year. In 1974, União Barbarense finished in Campeonato Paulista First Division's fourth place (there was no promotion to the Special Division in that year). In 1975, the club finished in Campeonato Paulista First Division's third place (there was no promotion to the Special Division in that year). In 1977 and 1978, the club was not included in the Intermediate Division, created in 1977, so, União Barbarense did not play in any FPF competition.

In 1979, União Barbarense returned to play in FPF competitions. The team competed in the Campeonato Paulista Third Division. The Third Division, besides its name, was actually the fifth level of Campeonato Paulista. In 1980, the FPF created a Second Division and promoted Barbarense to this division.

In 1990, the club was Campeonato Paulista Second Division's runner-up, returning to the Intermediate Division. In 1991, União Barbarense competed in the Campeonato Paulista Intermediate Division. In 1994, the FPF restructured the Paulista competitions in A-1 (first level), A-2 (second level) and A-3 (third level). União Barbarense was placed in A-3 and finished in tenth place. In 1995, União Barbarense took a leave of Campeonato Paulista A-3. In the same year, Antônio Guimarães Stadium was expanded and modernized.

In 1996, União Barbarense competed again in the Campeonato Paulista A-3. In 1997, The club was Campeonato Paulista A-3's runner-up, and was promoted to the following year's A-2. In 1998, União Barbarense was A-2 champion, thus being promoted to the following year's Campeonato Paulista First Division. In 1999 the club competed in the Campeonato Paulista First Division for the first time.

In 2004, União Barbarense was Campeonato Brasileiro Third Division champion, and was promoted to Campeonato Brasileiro Second Division. In 2005, the club was relegated to Campeonato Paulista Second Division (A-2). In 2005, União Barbarense was relegated to Campeonato Brasileiro Third Division, after ending the league in 20th.

== Stadium ==
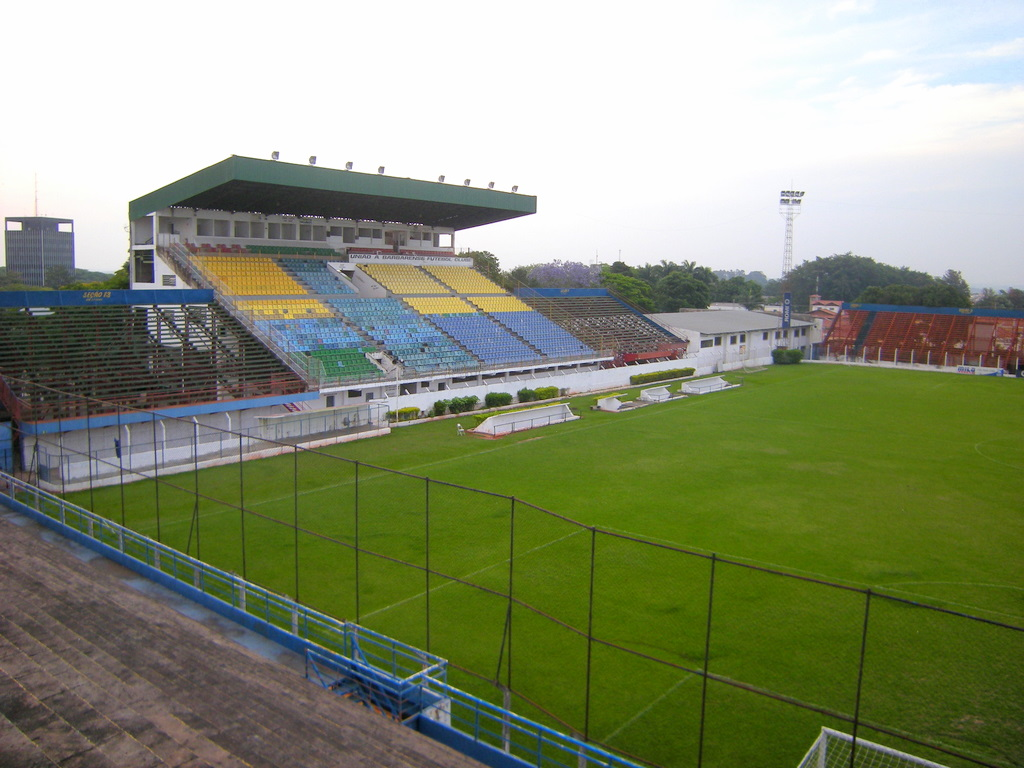
Antônio Guimarães Stadium views.

União Barbarense play their games at Estádio Antônio Lins Ribeiro Guimarães, which has capacity to house 14,914 fans. Antônio Lins Ribeiro Guimarães stadium is a football stadium in the city of Santa Bárbara d'Oeste, in the State of São Paulo in Brazil. Its name was given in honor of a former president and patron of the club. The correct name is Estádio Antônio Guimarães, but the spoken press prefers to call the Estádio Antônio Lins Ribeiro Guimarães, full name of patron and former president, by finding more "sound" and ended up being used by other professionals in the sports industry.

It was inaugurated on May 21, 1921 and in its first game União Barbarense beat EC Concórdia of Campinas 3-1.

For years the stadium was benefited by numerous reforms, such as the one that replaced the old wooden bleachers to until today standing concrete grandstands flanking Vila Aparecida and the numbered chairs located in the section near the walls of EE Américo Emílio Romi.

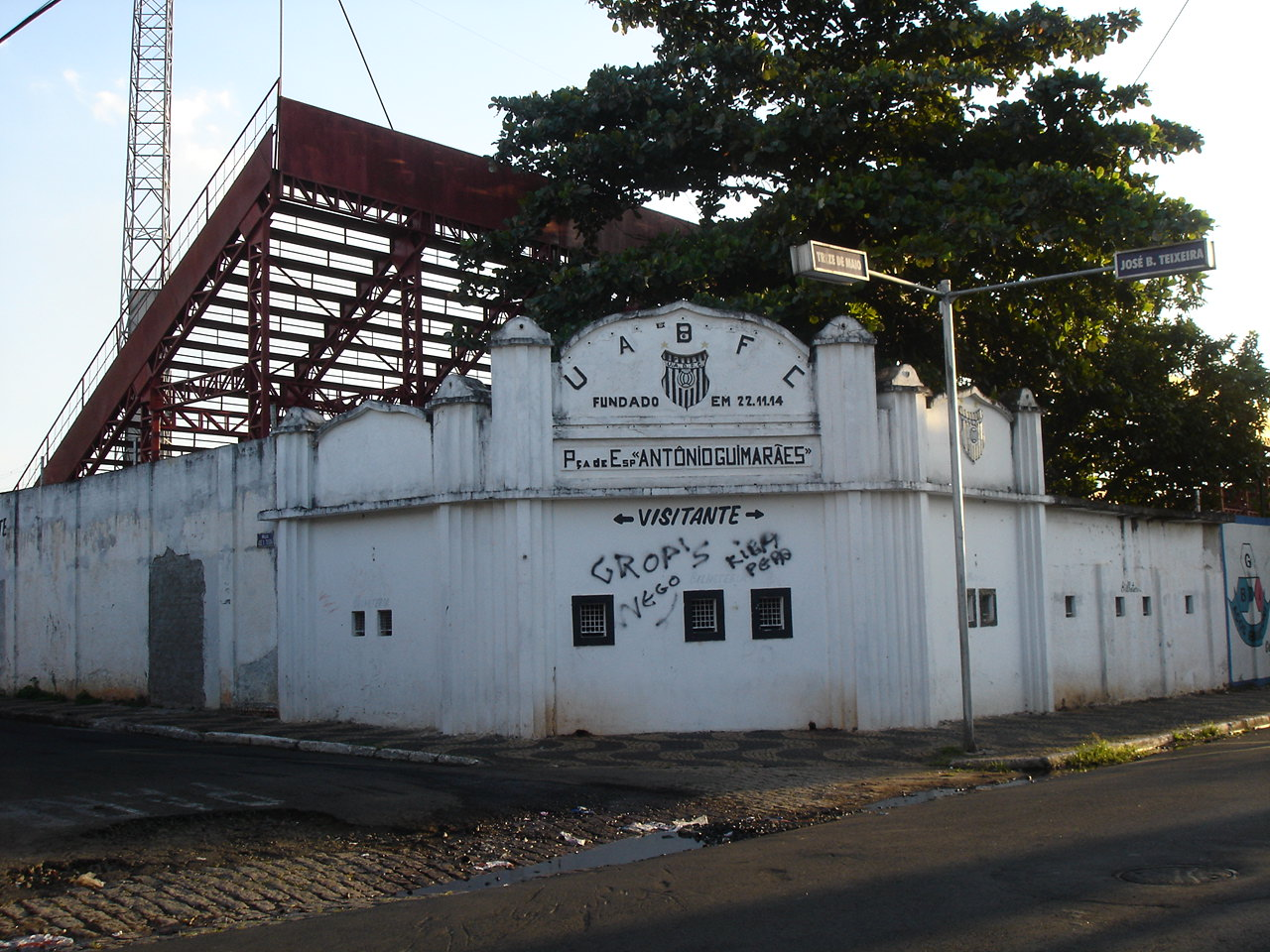
Exterior view of Estádio Antônio Lins Ribeiro Guimarães

In 1996, the União Agrícola Barbarense's stadium was expanded again in order to receive the games of the Campeonato Paulista Série A3 and upcoming national tournament games. The stadium has capacity to 14,914 people and is located on the street 13 de Maio street, number 1269, in Santa Bárbara d'Oeste.

On October 5, 2012, the Praça de Esporte Antônio Lins Ribeiro Guimarães received the news that after 91 years, would have installed on its place a modern electronic scoreboard, after 30 years, requested by fans and media professionals.

== Honours ==
=== Official tournaments ===
National
Competitions	Titles	Seasons
Campeonato Brasileiro Série C	1	2004
State
Competitions	Titles	Seasons
Campeonato Paulista Série A2	1	1998
Campeonato Paulista Série A3	1	1967
Campeonato Paulista Série A4	1	2025

=== Others tournaments ===
==== City ====
- Liga Barbarense de Futebol (1): 1946
- Taça Cidade de Santa Bárbara (3): 1957, 1961, 1963

=== Runners-up ===
- Copa Paulista (1): 2001
- Campeonato Paulista Série A2 (1): 2012
- Campeonato Paulista Série A3 (2): 1990, 1997
