= Clube Esportivo de Futebol =

Esportivo
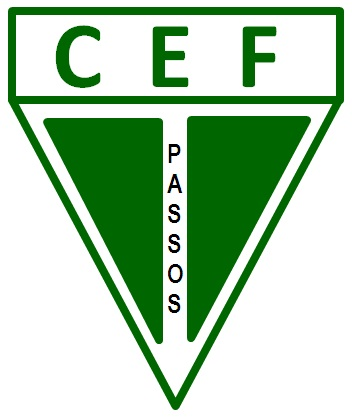
- Full name: Clube Esportivo de Futebol
- Founded: August 30, 1924
- Ground: Estádio Jorge Dias Oliva, Passos, Minas Gerais state, Brazil
- Capacity: 5,000
Home colours	Away colours

Clube Esportivo de Futebol, commonly known as Esportivo, is a Brazilian football team based in Passos, Minas Gerais state. They finished as the runners-up of the Série C once.

== History ==
The club was founded on August 30, 1929. Esportivo won the Campeonato Mineiro Second Level in 1985. They competed in the Série C in 1988, when they were defeated in the final by União São João. After political conflicts in the city of Passos, former members of Clube Esportivo de Futebol founded Clube Esportivo Passense de Futebol e Cultura on January 23, 2001.

== Honours ==
=== Official tournaments ===
State
Competitions	Titles	Seasons
Campeonato Mineiro Módulo II	1	1985

=== Others tournaments ===
==== State ====
- Campeonato Mineiro do Interior (1): 1989

=== Runners-up ===
- Campeonato Brasileiro Série C (1): 1988

== Stadium ==
Clube Esportivo de Futebol play their home games at Estádio Jorge Dias Oliva. The stadium has a maximum capacity of 5,000 people.
