= 2024 Campeonato Capixaba =

Campeonato Capixaba
- Season: 2024
- Dates: 17 January – 13 April 2024
- Champions: Rio Branco (38th title)
- Relegated: Estrela do Norte; Serra
- Copa do Brasil: Rio Branco; Rio Branco-VN
- Série D: Rio Branco
- Matches played: 59
- Goals scored: 139 (2.36 per match)

The 2024 Campeonato Capixaba was the 108th edition of Espírito Santo's top professional football league organized by FES. The competition started on January 17 and ended in April 13.

== Format ==
All 10 teams face each other in a single round in the first stage. The best eight advance to the quarterfinals and the last two places suffer relegation.

The quarterfinals, semi-finals and finals will be played in two-legged tie. The teams that had the best classification in the first stage are the home team of the second leg throughout the knockout and have, only in the quarterfinals, the advantage of the draw in the sum of the scores.

The champion qualifies for the 2025 Campeonato Brasileiro Série D, the 2025 Copa do Brasil and the 2025 Copa Verde. The runner-up takes the second spot for the 2025 Copa do Brasil.

== Participating teams ==
Team	City	2023 result
Desportiva Ferroviária	Cariacica	7th
Estrela do Norte	Cachoeiro do Itapemirim	8th
Jaguaré	Jaguaré	1st (Série B)
Nova Venécia	Nova Venécia	2nd
Porto Vitória	Vitória	3rd
Real Noroeste	Águia Branca	1st
Rio Branco	Vitória	5th
Rio Branco-VN	Venda Nova do Imigrante	2nd (Série B)
Serra	Serra	6th
Vitória	Vitória	4th

== First stage ==
Pos	Team	Pld	W	D	L	GF	GA	GD	Pts	Qualification or relegation
1	Rio Branco	9	6	1	2	13	5	+8	19	Advance to Quarter-finals
2	Real Noroeste	9	5	3	1	17	9	+8	18	Advance to Quarter-finals
3	Desportiva Ferroviária	9	4	4	1	13	11	+2	16	Advance to Quarter-finals
4	Porto Vitória	9	4	3	2	9	8	+1	15	Advance to Quarter-finals
5	Jaguaré	9	3	5	1	8	8	0	14	Advance to Quarter-finals
6	Rio Branco-VN	9	2	4	3	8	9	−1	10	Advance to Quarter-finals
7	Vitória	9	2	3	4	11	11	0	9	Advance to Quarter-finals
8	Nova Venécia	9	1	5	3	7	12	−5	8	Advance to Quarter-finals
9	Serra	9	1	2	6	11	16	−5	5	Relegation to 2025 Série B
10	Estrela do Norte	9	0	4	5	2	10	−8	4	Relegation to 2025 Série B

Source: ge
Rules for classification: 1) points; 2) wins; 3) goal difference; 4) goals scored; 5) head-to-head results; 6) disciplinary record; 7) random draw.

=== Results ===
Home \ Away	DES	EST	JAG	NVE	POR	RBR	RNO	RVN	SER	VIT
Desportiva Ferroviária	—	2–0	0–0	1–1	2–0	—	—	—	—	—
Estrela do Norte	—	—	—	0–0	1–1	0–1	—	0–0	—	—
Jaguaré	—	2–0	—	2–1	0–0	2–2	—	—	—	—
Nova Venécia	—	—	—	—	1–3	0–2	—	1–0	1–1	2–2
Porto Vitória	—	—	—	—	—	1–0	0–2	2–1	2–1	0–0
Rio Branco	4–0	—	—	—	—	—	0–1	1–0	—	1–0
Real Noroeste	2–2	1–0	1–2	1–1	—	—	—	—	5–1	—
Rio Branco-VN	3–3	—	0–0	—	—	—	1–1	—	—	2–1
Serra	0–0	1–1	5–0	—	—	1–2	—	0–1	—	—
Vitória	1–2	2–0	0–0	—	—	—	2–3	—	3–1	—

Updated to match(es) played on 3 March 2024. Source: ge
Legend: Blue = home team win; Yellow = draw; Red = away team win.

== Final stage ==
=== Bracket ===
Quarter-finals
1	Rio Branco	2	1	3
8	Nova Venécia	1	1	2
4	Porto Vitória	2	3	5
5	Jaguaré	3	2	5
2	Real Noroeste	1	2	3
7	Vitória	3	4	7
3	Desportiva Ferroviária	0	0	0
6	Rio Branco-VN	0	1	1

Semi-finals
Rio Branco	2	2	4
Porto Vitória	1	1	2
Vitória	0	1	2
Rio Branco-VN	1	2	3

Finals
Rio Branco	2	0	2 (3)
Rio Branco-VN	1	1	2 (2)

=== Quarter-finals ===
Team 1	Agg.	Team 2	1st leg	2nd leg
Rio Branco	3–2	Nova Venécia	2–1	1–1
Porto Vitória	5–5	Jaguaré	2–3	3–2
Real Noroeste	3–7	Vitória	1–3	2–4
Desportiva Ferroviária	0–1	Rio Branco-VN	0–0	0–1

==== Quarter-final 1 ====
9 March 2024
15:00 UTC-03:00

Nova Venécia	1–2	Rio Branco
	Report

Estádio Zenor Pedrosa, Nova Venécia
17 March 2024
15:30 UTC-03:00

Rio Branco	1–1	Nova Venécia
	Report

Estádio Kléber Andrade, Cariacica

==== Quarter-final 2 ====
8 March 2024
19:00 UTC-03:00

Jaguaré	3–2	Porto Vitória
	Report

Estádio Conilon, Jaguaré
15 March 2024
19:00 UTC-03:00

Porto Vitória	3–2	Jaguaré
	Report

Estádio Kléber Andrade, Cariacica

==== Quarter-final 3 ====
11 March 2024
19:30 UTC-03:00

Vitória	3–1	Real Noroeste
	Report

Estádio Salvador Costa, Vitória
16 March 2024
19:00 UTC-03:00

Real Noroeste	2–4	Vitória
	Report

Estádio José Olímpio da Rocha, Águia Branca

==== Quarter-final 4 ====
10 March 2024
15:30 UTC-03:00

Rio Branco-VN	0–0	Desportiva Ferroviária
	Report

Estádio Olimpio Perim, Venda Nova do Imigrante
16 March 2024
15:30 UTC-03:00

Desportiva Ferroviária	0–1	Rio Branco-VN
	Report

Estádio Engenheiro Araripe, Cariacica

=== Semi-finals ===
Team 1	Agg.	Team 2	1st leg	2nd leg
Rio Branco	4–2	Porto Vitória	2–1	2–1
Vitória	1–3	Rio Branco-VN	0–1	1–2

==== Semifinal 1 ====
24 March 2024
16:00 UTC-03:00

Porto Vitória	1–2	Rio Branco
	Report

Estádio Kléber Andrade, Cariacica
30 March 2024
17:00 UTC-03:00

Rio Branco	2–1	Porto Vitória
	Report

Estádio Kléber Andrade, Cariacica

==== Semifinal 2 ====
23 March 2024
17:00 UTC-03:00

Vitória	0–1	Rio Branco-VN
	Report

Estádio Salvador Costa, Vitória
31 March 2024
16:00 UTC-03:00

Rio Branco-VN	2–1	Vitória
	Report

Estádio Olimpio Perim, Venda Nova do Imigrante

=== Finals ===
Team 1	Agg.	Team 2	1st leg	2nd leg
Rio Branco	2–2 (3–2 p)	Rio Branco-VN	2–1	0–1

6 April 2024
16:00 UTC-03:00

Rio Branco-VN	1–2	Rio Branco
	Report

Estádio Kléber Andrade, Cariacica
13 April 2024
17:00 UTC-03:00

Rio Branco	0–1	Rio Branco-VN
	Report
Penalties
	3–2

Estádio Kléber Andrade, Cariacica
