= 2026 Campeonato Capixaba =

Campeonato Capixaba
- Season: 2026
- Dates: 13 January – 28 March 2026
- Champions: Porto Vitória (1st title)
- Relegated: Capixaba SC; Rio Branco-VN
- Série D: Porto Vitória
- Copa do Brasil: Porto Vitória; Serra
- Copa Centro-Oeste: Porto Vitória
- Matches: 59
- Goals: 124 (2.1 per match)

The 2026 Campeonato Capixaba was the 110th edition of Espírito Santo's top professional football league organized by FES. The competition started on January 13 and ended on March 28.

== Format ==
All 10 teams face each other in a single round in the first stage. The best eight advance to the quarterfinals and the last two places suffer relegation.

The quarterfinals, semi-finals and finals will be played in two-legged tie. The teams that had the best classification in the first stage are the home team of the second leg throughout the knockout and have, only in the quarterfinals, the advantage of the draw in the sum of the scores.

The champion qualifies for the 2027 Campeonato Brasileiro Série D, the 2027 Copa do Brasil and the 2027 Copa Centro-Oeste. The runner-up takes the second spot for the 2027 Copa do Brasil.

== Participating teams ==
Club	Headquarters	Home ground	2025 result
Capixaba SC	Vila Velha	Estádio Mário Monteiro (Cachoeiro de Itapemirim)	7th
Desportiva Ferroviária	Cariacica	Estádio Engenheiro Araripe	3rd
Forte	Castelo	Estádio Municipal Almiro Ofranti (Vargem Alta)	2nd (Série B)
Porto Vitória	Serra	Estádio Kleber Andrade (Cariacica)	2nd
Real Noroeste	Águia Branca	Estádio José Olimpio da Rocha	5th
Rio Branco	Vitória	Estádio Kleber Andrade (Cariacica)	1st
Rio Branco-VN	Venda Nova do Imigrante	Estádio Olímpio Perim	6th
Serra	Serra	Estádio Municipal Roberto Siqueira Costa	1st (Série B)
Vilavelhense	Vila Velha	Estádio Mário Monteiro (Cachoeiro de Itapemirim)	8th
Vitória	Vitória	Estádio Salvador Costa	4th

== First stage ==
Pos	Team	Pld	W	D	L	GF	GA	GD	Pts	Qualification or relegation
1	Vitória	9	6	2	1	14	4	+10	20	Advance to Quarter-finals
2	Serra	9	4	2	3	10	6	+4	14	Advance to Quarter-finals
3	Vilavelhense	9	4	1	4	8	10	−2	13	Advance to Quarter-finals
4	Rio Branco	9	3	4	2	10	6	+4	13	Advance to Quarter-finals
5	Porto Vitória	9	3	4	2	7	5	+2	13	Advance to Quarter-finals
6	Desportiva Ferroviária	9	3	2	4	10	11	−1	11	Advance to Quarter-finals
7	Real Noroeste	9	3	2	4	9	13	−4	11	Advance to Quarter-finals
8	Forte	9	2	5	2	5	4	+1	11	Advance to Quarter-finals
9	Capixaba SC	9	3	1	5	6	13	−7	10	Relegation to 2027 Série B
10	Rio Branco-VN	9	0	5	4	8	15	−7	5	Relegation to 2027 Série B

Source: FES
Rules for classification: 1) points; 2) wins; 3) goal difference; 4) goals scored; 5) head-to-head results; 6) disciplinary record; 7) random draw.

=== Results ===
Home \ Away	CSC	DES	FOR	POR	RNO	RBR	RVN	SER	VIL	VIT
Capixaba SC	—	—	—	—	0–2	0–2	1–1	—	2–1	—
Desportiva Ferroviária	0–1	—	—	0–0	—	1–1	3–1	—	1–2	—
Forte	0–2	0–1	—	—	—	—	—	2–0	—	0–0
Porto Vitória	2–0	—	0–0	—	—	—	2–2	0–1	1–0	—
Real Noroeste	—	3–2	0–2	0–1	—	—	—	1–1	—	0–4
Rio Branco	—	—	0–0	1–0	0–1	—	—	0–0	—	0–1
Rio Branco-VN	—	—	0–0	—	2–2	2–2	—	—	0–1	—
Serra	3–0	3–0	—	—	—	—	1–0	—	—	1–2
Vilavelhense	—	—	1–1	—	1–0	1–4	—	1–0	—	—
Vitória	2–0	0–2	—	1–1	—	—	3–0	—	1–0	—

Updated to match(es) played on 12 February 2026. Source: FES
Legend: Blue = home team win; Yellow = draw; Red = away team win.

== Final stage ==
=== Bracket ===
Quarter-finals
1	Vitória	1	4	5
8	Forte	1	1	2
4	Rio Branco	1	0	1
5	Porto Vitória	1	1	2
2	Serra	1	1	2
7	Real Noroeste	2	0	2
3	Vilavelhense	1	1	1
6	Desportiva Ferroviária	1	1	1

Semi-finals
Vitória	4	1	5 (4)
Porto Vitória	0	5	5 (5)
Serra	2	1	3
Vilavelhense	1	0	1

Finals
Porto Vitória	3	1	4
Serra	1	2	3

=== Quarter-finals ===
23 February 2026
19:00 UTC-03:00

Forte	1–1	Vitória
Arcado 75'	Report	Carlos Vitor 83'

Estádio Municipal Almiro Ofranti, Vargem Alta
Referee: Kesley dos Santos Pereira
1 March 2026
16:00 UTC-03:00

Vitória	4–1	Forte
João Paulo 5'; Tonoli 10' (pen.); Vinicius 15'; João Paulo 28'	Report	Breno 70'

Estádio Salvador Costa, Vitória
Referee: Wesley Silva dos Santos

21 February 2026
16:00 UTC-03:00

Porto Vitória	1–1	Rio Branco
Thallyson 41'	Report	Mendes 3'

Estádio Kleber Andrade, Cariacica
Referee: Jhonn Aliff Vargas Maciel
28 February 2026
16:00 UTC-03:00

Rio Branco	0–1	Porto Vitória
	Report	Firmino 14'

Estádio Kleber Andrade, Cariacica
Referee: Davi de Oliveira Lacerda

20 February 2026
19:00 UTC-03:00

Real Noroeste	2–1	Serra
Lima 10'; Murilo 59'	Report	Patrick Leonardo 45+2'

Estádio José Olimpio da Rocha, Águia Branca
Referee: Davi de Oliveira Lacerda
26 February 2026
20:00 UTC-03:00

Serra	1–0	Real Noroeste
Marcudinho 90+4'	Report

Estádio Municipal Roberto Siqueira Costa, Serra
Referee: Arthur Gomes Rabelo

22 February 2026
16:00 UTC-03:00

Desportiva Ferroviária	1–1	Vilavelhense
Ruan 14'	Report	Davis 74'

Estádio Engenheiro Araripe, Cariacica
Referee: Igor Borges Luz
27 February 2026
16:00 UTC-03:00

Vilavelhense	1–1	Desportiva Ferroviária
Silva 24' (o.g.)	Report	Bolt 54'

Estádio Mário Monteiro, Cachoeiro de Itapemirim
Referee: Wendel Loureiro Cabral

=== Semi-finals ===
8 March 2026
16:00 UTC-03:00

Porto Vitória	0–4	Vitória
	Report	Magatão 21'; João Paulo 37'; João Paulo 45+3'; Carlos Vitor 64'

Estádio Kleber Andrade, Cariacica
Referee: Jhonn Aliff Vargas Maciel
14 March 2026
16:00 UTC-03:00

Vitória	1–5	Porto Vitória
Truyts 56'	Report	Rian 2'; Firmino 44'; Tonoli 45+7' (o.g.); Thallyson 67'; Adriano 81'
Penalties
Toni (penalty scored); Magatão (penalty scored); Canário (penalty scored); Gualberto (penalty missed); Alexsandro (penalty scored); Patrick (penalty missed)	4–5	(penalty missed) Rangel; (penalty scored) Thallyson; (penalty scored) Bispo; (penalty scored) Luiz Henrique; (penalty scored) Reniê; (penalty scored) Moura

Estádio Salvador Costa, Vitória
Referee: Kesley dos Santos Pereira

7 March 2026
16:00 UTC-03:00

Vilavelhense	1–2	Serra
Palacios 49'	Report	Dandan 32' (pen.); Marcudinho 41'

Estádio Mário Monteiro, Cachoeiro de Itapemirim
Referee: Marcos Felipe Martins Machado
15 March 2026
16:00 UTC-03:00

Serra	1–0	Vilavelhense
Dandan 51'	Report

Estádio Municipal Roberto Siqueira Costa, Serra
Referee: Davi De Oliveira Lacerda

=== Finals ===
21 March 2026
16:00 UTC-03:00

Porto Vitória	3–1	Serra
Rian 2'; Rangel 11'; Luiz Henrique 90+6'	Report	Knupp 24'

Estádio Kleber Andrade, Cariacica
Referee: Wesley Silva dos Santos
28 March 2026
16:00 UTC-03:00

Serra	2–1	Porto Vitória
Marcudinho 51'; Hygor Gabriel 54'	Report	Rangel 39'

Estádio Kleber Andrade, Cariacica
Referee: Davi De Oliveira Lacerda
