= 2024 in Brazilian football =

Football in Brazil
- Season: 2024

Men's football
- Série A: Botafogo
- Série B: Santos
- Série C: Volta Redonda
- Série D: Retrô
- Copa do Brasil: Flamengo
- Supercopa: São Paulo

Women's football
- Série A1: Corinthians
- Série A2: Bahia
- Série A3: Vasco da Gama
- Supercopa Feminina: Corinthians

The following article presents a summary of the 2024 football (soccer) season in Brazil, which was the 123rd season of competitive football in the country.

== Campeonato Brasileiro Série A ==
The 2024 Campeonato Brasileiro Série A started on 13 April 2024 and ended on 8 December 2024.

- Athletico Paranaense
- Atlético Goianiense
- Atlético Mineiro
- Bahia
- Botafogo
- Corinthians
- Criciúma
- Cruzeiro
- Cuiabá
- Flamengo
- Fluminense
- Fortaleza
- Grêmio
- Internacional
- Juventude
- Palmeiras
- Red Bull Bragantino
- São Paulo
- Vasco da Gama
- Vitória

| Pos | Team | Pld | W | D | L | GF | GA | GD | Pts | Qualification or relegation |
|---|---|---|---|---|---|---|---|---|---|---|
| 1 | Botafogo (C) | 38 | 23 | 10 | 5 | 59 | 29 | +30 | 79 | Qualification for Copa Libertadores group stage (Note: Botafogo and Flamengo qualified for the Copa Libertadores group stage by winning the 2024 Copa Libertadores and the 2024 Copa do Brasil, respectively.) |
| 2 | Palmeiras | 38 | 22 | 7 | 9 | 60 | 33 | +27 | 73 | Qualification for Copa Libertadores group stage |
| 3 | Flamengo | 38 | 20 | 10 | 8 | 61 | 42 | +19 | 70 | Qualification for Copa Libertadores group stage |
| 4 | Fortaleza | 38 | 19 | 11 | 8 | 53 | 39 | +14 | 68 | Qualification for Copa Libertadores group stage |
| 5 | Internacional | 38 | 18 | 11 | 9 | 53 | 36 | +17 | 65 | Qualification for Copa Libertadores group stage |
| 6 | São Paulo | 38 | 17 | 8 | 13 | 53 | 43 | +10 | 59 | Qualification for Copa Libertadores group stage |
| 7 | Corinthians | 38 | 15 | 11 | 12 | 54 | 45 | +9 | 56 | Qualification for Copa Libertadores second stage |
| 8 | Bahia | 38 | 15 | 8 | 15 | 49 | 49 | 0 | 53 | Qualification for Copa Libertadores second stage |
| 9 | Cruzeiro | 38 | 14 | 10 | 14 | 43 | 41 | +2 | 52 | Qualification for Copa Sudamericana group stage |
| 10 | Vasco da Gama | 38 | 14 | 8 | 16 | 43 | 56 | −13 | 50 | Qualification for Copa Sudamericana group stage |
| 11 | Vitória | 38 | 13 | 8 | 17 | 45 | 52 | −7 | 47 | Qualification for Copa Sudamericana group stage |
| 12 | Atlético Mineiro | 38 | 11 | 14 | 13 | 47 | 54 | −7 | 47 | Qualification for Copa Sudamericana group stage |
| 13 | Fluminense | 38 | 12 | 10 | 16 | 33 | 39 | −6 | 46 | Qualification for Copa Sudamericana group stage |
| 14 | Grêmio | 38 | 12 | 9 | 17 | 44 | 50 | −6 | 45 | Qualification for Copa Sudamericana group stage |
| 15 | Juventude | 38 | 11 | 12 | 15 | 48 | 59 | −11 | 45 | |
| 16 | Red Bull Bragantino | 38 | 10 | 14 | 14 | 44 | 48 | −4 | 44 | |
| 17 | Athletico Paranaense (R) | 38 | 11 | 9 | 18 | 40 | 46 | −6 | 42 | Relegation to Campeonato Brasileiro Série B |
| 18 | Criciúma (R) | 38 | 9 | 11 | 18 | 42 | 61 | −19 | 38 | Relegation to Campeonato Brasileiro Série B |
| 19 | Atlético Goianiense (R) | 38 | 7 | 9 | 22 | 29 | 58 | −29 | 30 | Relegation to Campeonato Brasileiro Série B |
| 20 | Cuiabá (R) | 38 | 6 | 12 | 20 | 29 | 49 | −20 | 30 | Relegation to Campeonato Brasileiro Série B |

Source: CBF
Rules for classification: 1) points; 2) wins; 3) goal difference; 4) goals scored; 5) head-to-head results (only between two teams); 6) fewest red cards; 7) fewest yellow cards; 8) drawing of lots.
(C) Champions; (R) Relegated
Notes:

Botafogo won the league.

=== Relegation ===
The four worst placed teams, Atlético Goianiense, Cuiabá, Criciúma and Athletico Paranaense, were relegated to the following year's second level.

== Campeonato Brasileiro Série B ==
The 2024 Campeonato Brasileiro Série B started on 19 April 2024 and ended on 24 November 2024.

- Amazonas
- América Mineiro
- Avaí
- Botafogo (SP)
- Brusque
- Ceará
- Chapecoense
- Coritiba
- CRB
- Goiás
- Guarani
- Ituano
- Mirassol
- Novorizontino
- Operário Ferroviário
- Paysandu
- Ponte Preta
- Santos
- Sport
- Vila Nova

| Pos | Team | Pld | W | D | L | GF | GA | GD | Pts | Promotion or relegation |
|---|---|---|---|---|---|---|---|---|---|---|
| 1 | Santos (C, P) | 38 | 20 | 8 | 10 | 57 | 32 | +25 | 68 | Promotion to 2025 Campeonato Brasileiro Série A |
| 2 | Mirassol (P) | 38 | 19 | 10 | 9 | 42 | 26 | +16 | 67 | Promotion to 2025 Campeonato Brasileiro Série A |
| 3 | Sport (P) | 38 | 19 | 9 | 10 | 57 | 37 | +20 | 66 | Promotion to 2025 Campeonato Brasileiro Série A |
| 4 | Ceará (P) | 38 | 19 | 7 | 12 | 59 | 41 | +18 | 64 | Promotion to 2025 Campeonato Brasileiro Série A |
| 5 | Novorizontino | 38 | 18 | 10 | 10 | 43 | 31 | +12 | 64 | |
| 6 | Goiás | 38 | 18 | 9 | 11 | 56 | 32 | +24 | 63 | |
| 7 | Operário Ferroviário | 38 | 16 | 10 | 12 | 34 | 32 | +2 | 58 | |
| 8 | América Mineiro | 38 | 15 | 13 | 10 | 50 | 35 | +15 | 58 | |
| 9 | Vila Nova | 38 | 16 | 7 | 15 | 42 | 54 | −12 | 55 | |
| 10 | Avaí | 38 | 14 | 11 | 13 | 34 | 32 | +2 | 53 | |
| 11 | Amazonas | 38 | 14 | 10 | 14 | 31 | 37 | −6 | 52 | |
| 12 | Coritiba | 38 | 14 | 8 | 16 | 41 | 44 | −3 | 50 | |
| 13 | Paysandu | 38 | 12 | 14 | 12 | 41 | 43 | −2 | 50 | |
| 14 | Botafogo-SP | 38 | 11 | 12 | 15 | 36 | 51 | −15 | 45 | |
| 15 | Chapecoense | 38 | 11 | 11 | 16 | 34 | 45 | −11 | 44 | |
| 16 | CRB | 38 | 11 | 10 | 17 | 38 | 45 | −7 | 43 | |
| 17 | Ponte Preta (R) | 38 | 10 | 8 | 20 | 37 | 55 | −18 | 38 | Relegation to 2025 Campeonato Brasileiro Série C |
| 18 | Ituano (R) | 38 | 11 | 4 | 23 | 43 | 63 | −20 | 37 | Relegation to 2025 Campeonato Brasileiro Série C |
| 19 | Brusque (R) | 38 | 8 | 12 | 18 | 24 | 44 | −20 | 36 | Relegation to 2025 Campeonato Brasileiro Série C |
| 20 | Guarani (R) | 38 | 8 | 9 | 21 | 33 | 53 | −20 | 33 | Relegation to 2025 Campeonato Brasileiro Série C |

Source: CBF
Rules for classification: 1) points; 2) wins; 3) goal difference; 4) goals scored; 5) head-to-head results (only between 2 teams); 6) fewest red cards; 7) fewest yellow cards; 8) drawing of lots.
(C) Champions; (P) Promoted; (R) Relegated

Santos won the league.

=== Promotion ===
The four best placed teams, Santos, Mirassol, Ceará and Sport, were promoted to the following year's first level.

=== Relegation ===
The four worst placed teams, Brusque, Guarani, Ituano and Ponte Preta, were relegated to the following year's third level.

== Campeonato Brasileiro Série C ==
The 2024 Campeonato Brasileiro Série C started on 20 April 2024 and ended on 19 October 2024.

- ABC
- Aparecidense
- Athletic
- Botafogo (PB)
- Caxias
- Confiança
- CSA
- Ferroviária
- Ferroviário
- Figueirense
- Floresta
- Londrina
- Náutico
- Remo
- Sampaio Corrêa
- São Bernardo
- São José (RS)
- Tombense
- Volta Redonda
- Ypiranga (RS)

The Campeonato Brasileiro Série C final was played between Volta Redonda and Athletic.

12 October 2024

| Volta Redonda | 1–0 | Athletic |

Estádio Raulino de Oliveira, Volta Redonda

19 October 2024

| Athletic | 0–2 | Volta Redonda |

Arena Sicredi, São João del-Rei

Volta Redonda won the league after beating Athletic.

=== Promotion ===
The four best placed teams, Volta Redonda, Remo, Athletic and Ferroviária, were promoted to the following year's second level.

=== Relegation ===
The four worst placed teams, São José (RS), Ferroviário, Aparecidense and Sampaio Corrêa, were relegated to the following year's fourth level.

== Campeonato Brasileiro Série D ==
The 2024 Campeonato Brasileiro Série D started on 27 April 2024 and ended on 29 September 2024.

- Água Santa
- Águia de Marabá
- Altos
- América de Natal
- Anápolis
- ASA
- Atlético Cearense
- Audax Rio
- Avenida
- Barra
- Brasil de Pelotas
- Brasiliense
- Cametá
- Capital (TO)
- Cianorte
- Concórdia
- Costa Rica
- CRAC
- CSE
- Democrata SL
- FC Cascavel
- Fluminense (PI)
- Hercílio Luz
- Humaitá
- Iguatu
- Inter de Limeira
- Ipatinga
- Iporá
- Itabaiana
- Itabuna
- Jacuipense
- Juazeirense
- Manauara
- Manaus
- Maracanã
- Maranhão
- Maringá
- Mixto
- Moto Club
- Nova Iguaçu
- Novo Hamburgo
- Patrocinense
- Petrolina
- Porto Velho
- Portuguesa (RJ)
- Potiguar de Mossoró
- Pouso Alegre
- Princesa do Solimões
- Real Brasília
- Real Noroeste
- Retrô
- Rio Branco
- River
- Santa Cruz de Natal
- Santo André
- São José (SP)
- São Raimundo
- Sergipe
- Serra
- Sousa
- Tocantinópolis
- Trem
- Treze
- União Rondonópolis

Villa Nova and Democrata GV declined to participate in the Série D. The berths were awarded to Patrocinense and Caldense. Patrocinense accepted but Caldense refused to participate and were replaced by Democrata SL.

The Campeonato Brasileiro Série D final was played between Retrô and Anápolis.

22 September 2024

| Anápolis | 2–1 | Retrô |

Estádio Jonas Duarte, Anápolis

29 September 2024

| Retrô | 3–1 | Anápolis |

Arena Pernambuco, São Lourenço da Mata

Retrô won the league after defeating Anápolis.

=== Promotion ===
The four best placed teams, Anápolis, Retrô, Itabaiana and Maringá, were promoted to the following year's third level.

== Super cup ==
=== Supercopa Rei ===
The 2024 Supercopa Rei was played on 4 February 2024 between Palmeiras and São Paulo.

4 February 2024

| Palmeiras | 0–0 | São Paulo |
Penalties
| | 2–4 |

Mineirão, Belo Horizonte

São Paulo won the super cup after defeating Palmeiras.

== Domestic cups ==
=== Copa do Brasil ===
The 2024 Copa do Brasil started on 20 February 2024 and ended on 10 November 2024. The Copa do Brasil final was played between Atlético Mineiro and Flamengo.

3 November 2024

| Flamengo | 3–1 | Atlético Mineiro |

Maracanã, Rio de Janeiro

10 November 2024

| Atlético Mineiro | 0–1 | Flamengo |

Arena MRV, Belo Horizonte

Flamengo won the cup after defeating Atlético Mineiro.

=== Copa do Nordeste ===
The competition featured 16 clubs from the Northeastern region. It started on 3 February 2024 and ended on 9 June 2024. The Copa do Nordeste final was played between Fortaleza and CRB.

5 June 2024

| Fortaleza | 2–0 | CRB |

Castelão, Fortaleza

9 June 2024

| CRB | 2–0 | Fortaleza |
Penalties
| | 4–5 |

Estádio Rei Pelé, Maceió

Fortaleza won the cup after defeating CRB.

=== Copa Verde ===
The competition featured 24 clubs from the North and Central-West regions, including two teams from Espírito Santo. It started on 22 February 2024 and ended on 29 May 2024. The Copa Verde final was played between Paysandu and Vila Nova.

22 May 2024

| Paysandu | 6–0 | Vila Nova |

Estádio da Curuzu, Belém

29 May 2024

| Vila Nova | 0–4 | Paysandu |

Estádio Olímpico Pedro Ludovico, Goiânia

Paysandu won the cup after defeating Vila Nova.

== State championship champions ==
| State | Champions |
|---|---|
| (Acre (state)) Acre | Independência |
| Alagoas | CRB |
| Amapá | Trem |
| (Amazonas (Brazilian state)) Amazonas | Manaus |
| Bahia | Vitória |
| Ceará | Ceará |
| (Federal District (Brazil)) Distrito Federal | Ceilândia |
| Espírito Santo | Rio Branco |
| Goiás | Atlético Goianiense |
| Maranhão | Sampaio Corrêa |
| Mato Grosso | Cuiabá |
| Mato Grosso do Sul | Operário |
| Minas Gerais | Atlético Mineiro |
| Pará | Paysandu |
| Paraíba | Sousa |
| (Paraná (state)) Paraná | Athletico Paranaense |
| Pernambuco | Sport |
| Piauí | Altos |
| (Rio de Janeiro (state)) Rio de Janeiro | Flamengo |
| Rio Grande do Norte | América de Natal |
| Rio Grande do Sul | Grêmio |
| Rondônia | Porto Velho |
| Roraima | GAS |
| (Santa Catarina (state)) Santa Catarina | Criciúma |
| (São Paulo (state)) São Paulo | Palmeiras |
| Sergipe | Confiança |
| Tocantins | União |

== State championship second division champions ==
| State | Champions |
|---|---|
| Alagoas | Igaci |
| Amapá | Portuguesa |
| (Amazonas (Brazilian state)) Amazonas | Sete |
| Bahia | Colo Colo |
| Ceará | Tirol |
| (Federal District (Brazil)) Distrito Federal | Sobradinho |
| Espírito Santo | Capixaba |
| Goiás | Inhumas |
| Maranhão | Viana/Real Codó |
| Mato Grosso | Cáceres |
| Mato Grosso do Sul | Naviraiense |
| Minas Gerais | Betim |
| Pará | Independente |
| Paraíba | Auto Esporte |
| (Paraná (state)) Paraná | Paraná |
| Pernambuco | Jaguar |
| Piauí | Piauí |
| (Rio de Janeiro (state)) Rio de Janeiro | Maricá |
| Rio Grande do Norte | Laguna |
| Rio Grande do Sul | Monsoon |
| Rondônia | Guaporé |
| (Santa Catarina (state)) Santa Catarina | Caravaggio |
| (São Paulo (state)) São Paulo | Velo Clube |
| Sergipe | Guarany |
| Tocantins | Bela Vista |

== State championship third division champions ==
| State | Champions |
|---|---|
| Ceará | Quixadá |
| Goiás | Rio Verde |
| Minas Gerais | Guarani |
| Pará | Amazônia |
| Paraíba | Miramar |
| (Paraná (state)) Paraná | Batel |
| Pernambuco | América |
| (Rio de Janeiro (state)) Rio de Janeiro | São Gonçalo |
| Rio Grande do Sul | Gramadense |
| (Santa Catarina (state)) Santa Catarina | Fluminense |
| (São Paulo (state)) São Paulo | Votuporanguense |

== State championship fourth division champions ==
| State | Champions |
|---|---|
| (Rio de Janeiro (state)) Rio de Janeiro | Campo Grande |
| (São Paulo (state)) São Paulo | Rio Branco |

== State championship fifth division champions ==
| State | Champions |
|---|---|
| (Rio de Janeiro (state)) Rio de Janeiro | Niteroiense |
| (São Paulo (state)) São Paulo | Paulista |

== State cup competition champions ==
| Competition | Champions |
|---|---|
| Copa Alagoas | CSA |
| Copa ES | Porto Vitória |
| Copa Fares Lopes | Ferroviário |
| Copa FGF | São José |
| Copa FMF | CEOV |
| Copa Paulista | Monte Azul |
| Copa Rio | Maricá |
| Copa Santa Catarina | Concórdia |

== Youth competition champions ==
| Competition | Champions |
|---|---|
| Campeonato Brasileiro de Aspirantes | Red Bull Bragantino |
| Campeonato Brasileiro Sub-20 | Palmeiras |
| Copa do Brasil Sub-20 | São Paulo |
| Campeonato Brasileiro Sub-17 | Fluminense |
| Copa do Brasil Sub-17 | Fluminense |
| Copa São Paulo de Futebol Júnior | Corinthians |
| Copa 2 de Julho Sub-15 | Goiás |

== Brazilian clubs in international competitions ==
| Team | 2024 Copa Libertadores | 2024 Copa Sudamericana | 2024 Recopa Sudamericana | 2024 FIFA Intercontinental Cup |
|---|---|---|---|---|
| Athletico Paranaense | N/A | Quarter-finals eliminated by (Argentina) Racing | N/A | N/A |
| Atlético Mineiro | Runners-up lost to (Brazil) Botafogo | N/A | N/A | N/A |
| Botafogo | Champions defeated (Brazil) Atlético Mineiro | N/A | N/A | Second stage eliminated by (Mexico) Pachuca |
| Corinthians | N/A | Semi-finals eliminated by (Argentina) Racing | N/A | N/A |
| Cruzeiro | N/A | Runners-up lost to (Argentina) Racing | N/A | N/A |
| Cuiabá | N/A | Knockout round play-offs eliminated by (Chile) Palestino | N/A | N/A |
| Flamengo | Quarter-finals eliminated by (Uruguay) Peñarol | N/A | N/A | N/A |
| Fluminense | Quarter-finals eliminated by (Brazil) Atlético Mineiro | N/A | Champions defeated (Ecuador) LDU Quito | N/A |
| Fortaleza | N/A | Quarter-finals eliminated by (Brazil) Corinthians | N/A | N/A |
| Grêmio | Round of 16 eliminated by (Brazil) Fluminense | N/A | N/A | N/A |
| Internacional | N/A | Knockout round play-offs eliminated by (Argentina) Rosario Central | N/A | N/A |
| Palmeiras | Round of 16 eliminated by (Brazil) Botafogo | N/A | N/A | N/A |
| Red Bull Bragantino | Third Stage eliminated by (Brazil) Botafogo | Round of 16 eliminated by (Brazil) Corinthians | N/A | N/A |
| São Paulo | Quarter-finals eliminated by (Brazil) Botafogo | N/A | N/A | N/A |

== National team ==
The following table lists all the games played by the Brazilian national team in official competitions and friendly matches during 2024.

=== Friendlies ===
| 23 March | England | 0–1 | Brazil | London, England |
| 19:00 UTC+0 | | Report | Endrick 80' | Stadium: Wembley Stadium; Attendance: 83,674; Referee: Artur Soares Dias (Portugal) |

| 26 March | Spain | 3–3 | Brazil | Madrid, Spain |
| 21:30 UTC+1 | Rodri 12' (pen.), 87' (pen.); Olmo 36' | Report | Rodrygo 40'; Endrick 50'; Lucas Paquetá 90+6' (pen.) | Stadium: Santiago Bernabéu Stadium; Referee: António Emanuel Carvalho Nobre (Portugal) |

| 8 June | Mexico | 2–3 | Brazil | College Station, United States |
| 20:00 UTC−5 | Quiñones 72'; Martínez 90+2' | Report | Andreas Pereira 5'; Gabriel Martinelli 53'; Endrick 90+5' | Stadium: Kyle Field; Attendance: 85,249; Referee: Lukasz Szpala (United States) |

| 12 June | United States | 1–1 | Brazil | Orlando, United States |
| 19:00 UTC−4 | Pulisic 26' | Report | Rodrygo 17' | Stadium: Camping World Stadium; Attendance: 60,016; Referee: Saíd Martínez (Honduras) |

=== 2024 Copa América ===
| 24 June Group D | Brazil | 0–0 | Costa Rica | Inglewood, United States |
| 18:00 UTC−7 | | Report | | Stadium: SoFi Stadium; Attendance: 67,158; Referee: César Arturo Ramos (Mexico) |

| 28 June Group D | Paraguay | 1–4 | Brazil | Paradise, United States |
| 18:00 UTC−7 | Alderete 48' | Report | Vinícius Júnior 35', 45+5'; Savinho 43'; Lucas Paquetá 65' (pen.) | Stadium: Allegiant Stadium; Attendance: 46,939; Referee: Piero Maza (Chile) |

| 2 July Group D | Brazil | 1–1 | Colombia | Santa Clara, United States |
| 18:00 UTC−7 | Raphinha 12' | Report | Muñoz 45+2' | Stadium: Levi's Stadium; Attendance: 70,971; Referee: Jesús Valenzuela (Venezuela) |

| 6 July Quarter-finals | Uruguay | 0–0 (4–2 p) | Brazil | Paradise, United States |
| 18:00 UTC−7 | | Report | | Stadium: Allegiant Stadium; Attendance: 55,770; Referee: Darío Herrera (Argentina) |
| | Penalties |
| | Valverde (penalty scored); Bentancur (penalty scored); De Arrascaeta (penalty scored); Giménez (penalty missed); Ugarte (penalty scored) | | (penalty missed) Éder Militão; (penalty scored) Andreas Pereira; (penalty missed) Douglas Luiz; (penalty scored) Gabriel Martinelli |

=== 2026 FIFA World Cup qualification ===
| 6 September | Brazil | 1–0 | Ecuador | Curitiba, Brazil |
| 22:00 UTC−3 | Rodrygo 30' | Report | | Stadium: Estádio Couto Pereira; Attendance: 36,914; Referee: Facundo Tello (Argentina) |

| 10 September | Paraguay | 1–0 | Brazil | Asunción, Paraguay |
| 20:30 UTC−4 | D. Gómez 20' | Report | | Stadium: Estadio Defensores del Chaco; Attendance: 31,962; Referee: Andrés Matonte (Uruguay) |

| 10 October | Chile | 1–2 | Brazil | Santiago, Chile |
| 21:00 UTC−3 | Vargas 2' | Report | Igor Jesus 45+1'; Luiz Henrique 89' | Stadium: Estadio Nacional Julio Martínez Prádanos; Attendance: 43,059; Referee: Darío Herrera (Argentina) |

| 15 October | Brazil | 4–0 | Peru | Brasília, Brazil |
| 21:45 UTC−3 | Raphinha 38' (pen.), 54' (pen.); Andreas Pereira 71'; Luiz Henrique 74' | Report | | Stadium: Arena BRB Mané Garrincha; Attendance: 60,139; Referee: Esteban Ostojich (Uruguay) |

| 14 November | Venezuela | 1–1 | Brazil | Maturín, Venezuela |
| 17:00 UTC−4 | Segovia 46' | Report | Raphinha 43' | Stadium: Estadio Monumental de Maturín; Attendance: 32,200; Referee: Andrés Rojas (Colombia) |

| 19 November | Brazil | 1–1 | Uruguay | Salvador, Brazil |
| 21:45 UTC−3 | Gerson 62' | Report | Valverde 55' | Stadium: Casa de Apostas Arena Fonte Nova; Attendance: 41,511; Referee: Piero Maza (Chile) |

| Competition | Performance |
|---|---|
| Copa América | Quarter-finals eliminated by Uruguay |

== Women's football ==
=== Campeonato Brasileiro de Futebol Feminino Série A1 ===
The 2024 Campeonato Brasileiro de Futebol Feminino Série A1 started on 15 March 2024 and ended on 22 September 2024.

- América Mineiro
- Atlético Mineiro
- Avaí
- Botafogo
- Corinthians
- Cruzeiro
- Ferroviária
- Flamengo/Marinha
- Fluminense
- Grêmio
- Internacional
- Palmeiras
- Real Brasília
- Red Bull Bragantino
- Santos
- São Paulo

The Campeonato Brasileiro de Futebol Feminino Série A1 final was played between Corinthians and São Paulo.

15 September 2024

| São Paulo | 1–3 | Corinthians |

MorumBIS, São Paulo

22 September 2024

| Corinthians | 2–0 | São Paulo |

Neo Química Arena, São Paulo

Corinthians won the league after defeating São Paulo.

==== Relegation ====
The four worst placed teams, Atlético Mineiro, Avaí, Santos and Botafogo, were relegated to the following year's second level.

=== Campeonato Brasileiro de Futebol Feminino Série A2 ===
The 2024 Campeonato Brasileiro de Futebol Feminino Série A2 started on 13 April 2024 and ended on 4 August 2024.

- 3B da Amazônia
- Athletico Paranaense
- Bahia
- Doce Mel/Jequié EC
- Fortaleza
- JC
- Juventude
- Minas/ICESP
- Mixto
- Recanto
- Remo
- São José
- Sport
- AD Taubaté
- UDA
- VF4

CBF excluded Real Ariquemes from all national competitions due to regularization issues. They were replaced by Recanto
Ceará declined to participate in the Série A2. CBF awarded their berth to Uberlândia but they refused to participate and were replaced by Doce Mel/Jequié EC.

The Campeonato Brasileiro de Futebol Feminino Série A2 final was played between Bahia and 3B da Amazônia.

28 July 2024

| 3B da Amazônia | 0–0 | Bahia |

Arena da Amazônia, Manaus

4 August 2024

| Bahia | 2–1 | 3B da Amazônia |

Estádio de Pituaçu, Salvador

Bahia won the league after defeating 3B da Amazônia.

==== Promotion ====
The four best placed teams, Sport, 3B da Amazônia, Bahia and Juventude, were promoted to the following year's first level.

==== Relegation ====
The four worst placed teams, Recanto, Doce Mel/Jequié EC, VF4 and UDA, were relegated to the following year's third level.

=== Campeonato Brasileiro de Futebol Feminino Série A3 ===
The 2024 Campeonato Brasileiro de Futebol Feminino Série A3 started on 13 April 2024 and ended on 27 July 2024.

- Ação
- Acauã
- Aliança
- Atlético Acreano
- Botafogo (PB)
- Brasil de Farroupilha
- Confiança
- Coritiba
- CRESSPOM
- ESMAC
- Fluminense (SC)
- IAPE
- Mixto (PB)
- Nacional VRB
- Náutico
- Operário
- Paraíso
- Paysandu
- Pinda/Ferroviária
- Porto Velho
- R4
- Realidade Jovem
- Rio Negro
- Sobradinho
- Tarumã
- Tiradentes
- União
- Vasco da Gama
- Vila Nova/UNIVERSO
- Vila Nova (ES)
- Vitória
- Ypiranga (AP)

The Campeonato Brasileiro de Futebol Feminino Série A3 final was played between Vasco da Gama and Paysandu.

21 July 2024

| Paysandu | 1–2 | Vasco da Gama |

Estádio da Curuzu, Belém

27 July 2024

| Vasco da Gama | 0–0 | Paysandu |

Estádio Luso Brasileiro, Rio de Janeiro

Vasco da Gama won the league after defeating Paysandu.

==== Promotion ====
The four best placed teams, Vitória, Ação, Paysandu and Vasco da Gama, were promoted to the following year's second level.

=== Super cup ===
==== Supercopa do Brasil de Futebol Feminino ====
The competition featured 8 clubs chosen between the top-twelve 2023 Série A1 and the top-four 2023 Série A2, with only one team for state. It started on 9 February 2024 and ended on 18 February 2024. The Supercopa do Brasil de Futebol Feminino final was played between Cruzeiro and Corinthians.

18 February 2024

| Corinthians | 1–0 | Cruzeiro |

Neo Química Arena, São Paulo

Corinthians won the super cup after defeating Cruzeiro.

=== Domestic competition champions ===
| State | Champions |
|---|---|
| (Acre (state)) Acre | Galvez |
| Alagoas | UDA |
| Amapá | Ypiranga |
| (Amazonas (Brazilian state)) Amazonas | 3B da Amazônia |
| Bahia | Bahia |
| Ceará | Ceará |
| (Federal District (Brazil)) Distrito Federal | Real Brasília |
| Espírito Santo | Prosperidade |
| Goiás | Vila Nova/UNIVERSO |
| Maranhão | IAPE |
| Mato Grosso | Operário FC |
| Mato Grosso do Sul | Operário |
| Minas Gerais | Cruzeiro |
| Pará | Tuna Luso |
| Paraíba | Mixto |
| (Paraná (state)) Paraná | Athletico Paranaense |
| Pernambuco | Sport |
| Piauí | Atlético Piauiense |
| (Rio de Janeiro (state)) Rio de Janeiro | Flamengo/Marinha |
| Rio Grande do Norte | União |
| Rio Grande do Sul | Grêmio |
| Rondônia | Rolim de Moura |
| Roraima | Rio Negro |
| (Santa Catarina (state)) Santa Catarina | Avaí |
| (São Paulo (state)) São Paulo | Palmeiras |
| Sergipe | Juventude |
| Tocantins | 100 Limites/Araguaína |

=== State cup competition champions ===
| Competition | Champions |
|---|---|
| Copa Pará de Futebol Feminino | Paysandu |
| Copa Paulista de Futebol Feminino | Santos |
| Copa Rio de Futebol Feminino | Botafogo |

=== Youth competition champions ===
| Competition | Champions |
|---|---|
| Campeonato Brasileiro de Futebol Feminino Sub-20 | Flamengo/Marinha |
| Campeonato Brasileiro de Futebol Feminino Sub-17 | Internacional |
| Copa São Paulo de Futebol Feminino | Fluminense |

=== Brazilian clubs in international competitions ===
| Team | 2024 Copa Libertadores Femenina |
|---|---|
| Corinthians | Champions defeated (Colombia) Santa Fe |
| Ferroviária | Eliminated in the Group stage |
| Santos | Quarter-finals eliminated by (Argentina) Boca Juniors |

=== National team ===
The following table lists all the games played by the Brazil women's national football team in official competitions and friendly matches during 2024.

The Brazil women's national football team competed in the following competitions in 2024:

==== Friendlies ====
| 1 June | Brazil | 4–0 | Jamaica | São Lourenço da Mata, Brazil |
| 17:00 (BRT) | Adriana 25'; C. Swaby 38' (o.g.); Marta 63', 89' | Report | | Stadium: Arena Pernambuco; Attendance: 27,031; Referee: Zulma Quiñónez (Paraguay) |

| 4 June | Brazil | 4–0 | Jamaica | Salvador, Brazil |
| 20:00 (BRT) | Debinha 6'; Jheniffer 63', 78'; Marta 83' | Report | | Stadium: Arena Fonte Nova; Attendance: 31,547; Referee: Emikar Calderas (Venezuela) |

| 26 October | Brazil | 1–1 | Colombia | Cariacica, Brazil |
| 18:30 (BRT) | Tarciane 74' | Report | Usme 5' | Stadium: Estádio Kléber Andrade; Attendance: 10,564; Referee: Dione Rissios (Chile) |

| 29 October | Brazil | 3–1 | Colombia | Cariacica, Brazil |
| 19:00 (BRT) | Isa Haas 27'; Gio Queiroz 45+1'; Adriana 81' (pen.) | Report | Caicedo 68' | Stadium: Estádio Kléber Andrade; Referee: María Belén Carvajal (Chile) |

| 28 November | Australia | 1–3 | Brazil | Brisbane, Australia |
| 20:00 (AEST) | Foord 43' | Report | Amanda Gutierres 6', 13'; Gio Queiroz 53' | Stadium: Suncorp Stadium; Attendance: 47,501; Referee: Oh Hyeon-jeong (South Korea) |

| 1 December | Australia | 1–2 | Brazil | Gold Coast, Australia |
| 18:35 (AEST) | Raso 42' | Report | Gabi Portilho 29'; Lauren 40' | Stadium: Cbus Super Stadium; Attendance: 25,297; Referee: Kim Yu-jeong (South Korea) |

==== 2024 CONCACAF W Gold Cup ====
| 21 February Group B | Brazil | 1–0 | Puerto Rico | San Diego, United States |
| 19:15 (PST) | Gabi Nunes 81' | Report | | Stadium: Snapdragon Stadium; Attendance: 935; Referee: Natalie Simon (United States) |

| 24 February Group B | Colombia | 0–1 | Brazil | San Diego, United States |
| 19:15 (PST) | | Report | Duda Santos 6' | Stadium: Snapdragon Stadium; Attendance: 4,799; Referee: Tori Penso (United States) |

| 27 February Group B | Brazil | 5–0 | Panama | San Diego, United States |
| 19:15 (PST) | Geyse 4', 74'; Bia Menezes 10'; Rafaelle 23'; Debinha 51' | Report | | Stadium: Snapdragon Stadium; Referee: Myriam Marcotte (Canada) |

| 2 March Quarter-finals | Brazil | 5–1 | Argentina | Los Angeles, United States |
| 19:15 (PST) | Vitória Yaya 19'; Yasmim 36'; Bia Zaneratto 54', 90+5'; Gabi Nunes 62' | Report | Dos Santos 82' | Stadium: BMO Stadium; Attendance: 2,824; Referee: Myriam Marcotte (Canada) |

| 6 March Semi-finals | Brazil | 3–0 | Mexico | San Diego, United States |
| 16:00 (PST) | Adriana 21'; Antônia 32'; Yasmim 48' | Report | | Stadium: Snapdragon Stadium; Referee: Tori Penso (United States) |

| 10 March Final | United States | 1–0 | Brazil | San Diego, United States |
| 17:15 (PDT) | Horan 45+1' | Report | | Stadium: Snapdragon Stadium; Attendance: 31,528; Referee: Melissa Borjas (Honduras) |

==== 2024 SheBelieves Cup ====
| 6 April Semi-finals | Brazil | 1–1 (2–4 p) | Canada | Atlanta, United States |
| 15:30 (EDT) | Tarciane 22' (pen.) | Report | Gilles 77' | Stadium: Mercedes-Benz Stadium; Attendance: 50,644; Referee: Tori Penso (United States) |
| | Penalties |
| | Marta (penalty missed); Cristiane (penalty scored); Antônia (penalty missed); Tarciane (penalty scored) | | (penalty missed) Lawrence; (penalty scored) Leon; (penalty scored) J. Rose; (penalty scored) Awujo; (penalty scored) Grosso |

| 9 April Third place match | Japan | 1–1 (0–3 p) | Brazil | Columbus, United States |
| 16:00 (EDT) | Tanaka 35' | Report | Cristiane 71' | Stadium: Lower.com Field; Attendance: 12,001; Referee: Danielle Chesky (United States) |
| | Penalties |
| | Seike (penalty missed); Nagano (penalty missed); Hasegawa (penalty missed) | | (penalty scored) Cristiane; (penalty scored) Tarciane; (penalty scored) Angelina |

==== 2024 Summer Olympics ====
| 25 July Group C | Nigeria | 0–1 | Brazil | Bordeaux, France |
| 19:00 (CEST) | | Report | Gabi Nunes 37' | Stadium: Nouveau Stade de Bordeaux; Attendance: 6,244; Referee: Kim Yu-jeong (South Korea) |

| 28 July Group C | Brazil | 1–2 | Japan | Paris, France |
| 17:00 (CEST) | Jheniffer 56' | Report | Kumagai 90+2' (pen.); Tanikawa 90+6' | Stadium: Parc des Princes; Attendance: 40,918; Referee: Rebecca Welch (England) |

| 31 July Group C | Brazil | 0–2 | Spain | Bordeaux, France |
| 17:00 (CEST) | | Report | Athenea 68'; Putellas 90+17' | Stadium: Nouveau Stade de Bordeaux; Attendance: 14,497; Referee: Espen Eskås (Norway) |

| 3 August Quarter-finals | France | 0–1 | Brazil | Nantes, France |
| 21:00 (CEST) | | Report | Gabi Portilho 82' | Stadium: Stade de la Beaujoire; Attendance: 32,280; Referee: Tori Penso (United States) |

| 6 August Semi-finals | Brazil | 4–2 | Spain | Marseille, France |
| 21:00 (CEST) | Paredes 6' (o.g.); Gabi Portilho 45+4'; Adriana 71'; Kerolin 90+1' | Report | Paralluelo 85', 90+12' | Stadium: Stade Vélodrome; Attendance: 14,201; Referee: Rebecca Welch (England) |

| 10 August Final | Brazil | 0–1 | United States | Paris, France |
| 17:00 (CEST) | | Report | Swanson 57' | Stadium: Parc des Princes; Attendance: 43,813; Referee: Tess Olofsson (Sweden) |

| Competition | Performance |
|---|---|
| CONCACAF W Gold Cup | Runners-up lost to United States |
| SheBelieves Cup | Third place |
| Summer Olympics | Runners-up lost to United States |
