= 2025 Campeonato Capixaba =

Campeonato Capixaba
- Season: 2025
- Dates: 18 January – 5 April 2025
- Champions: Rio Branco (39th title)
- Relegated: Jaguaré; Nova Venécia
- Série D: Rio Branco
- Copa do Brasil: Rio Branco; Porto Vitória
- Matches: 59
- Goals: 131 (2.22 per match)

The 2025 Campeonato Capixaba was the 109th edition of Espírito Santo's top professional football league organized by FES. The competition started on January 18 and ended on April 5.

== Format ==
All 10 teams face each other in a single round in the first stage. The best eight advance to the quarterfinals and the last two places suffer relegation.

The quarterfinals, semi-finals and finals will be played in two-legged tie. The teams that had the best classification in the first stage are the home team of the second leg throughout the knockout and have, only in the quarterfinals, the advantage of the draw in the sum of the scores.

The champion qualifies for the 2026 Campeonato Brasileiro Série D, the 2026 Copa do Brasil and the 2026 Copa Centro-Oeste. The runner-up takes the second spot for the 2026 Copa do Brasil.

== Participating teams ==
Team	City	2024 result
Desportiva Ferroviária	Cariacica	6th
Jaguaré	Jaguaré	7th
Nova Venécia	Nova Venécia	8th
Porto Vitória	Vitória	3rd
Real Noroeste	Águia Branca	5th
Rio Branco	Vitória	1st
Rio Branco-VN	Venda Nova do Imigrante	2nd
Capixaba SC	Vila Velha	1st (Série B)
Vilavelhense	Vila Velha	2nd (Série B)
Vitória	Vitória	4th

== First stage ==
Pos	Team	Pld	W	D	L	GF	GA	GD	Pts	Qualification or relegation
1	Desportiva Ferroviária	9	6	3	0	16	3	+13	21	Advance to Quarter-finals
2	Real Noroeste	9	4	4	1	13	8	+5	16	Advance to Quarter-finals
3	Rio Branco-VN	9	4	3	2	10	6	+4	15	Advance to Quarter-finals
4	Capixaba SC	9	4	2	3	12	12	0	14	Advance to Quarter-finals
5	Rio Branco	9	3	5	1	11	6	+5	14	Advance to Quarter-finals
6	Vitória	9	2	3	4	14	10	+4	9	Advance to Quarter-finals
7	Porto Vitória	9	2	3	4	8	11	−3	9	Advance to Quarter-finals
8	Vilavelhense	9	2	2	5	7	15	−8	8	Advance to Quarter-finals
9	Nova Venécia	9	2	2	5	7	17	−10	8	Relegation to 2026 Série B
10	Jaguaré	9	1	3	5	5	15	−10	6	Relegation to 2026 Série B

Source: ge
Rules for classification: 1) points; 2) wins; 3) goal difference; 4) goals scored; 5) head-to-head results; 6) disciplinary record; 7) random draw.

=== Results ===
Home \ Away	DES	JAG	NVE	POR	RNO	RBR	RVN	SCC	VIL	VIT
Desportiva Ferroviária	—	—	2–0	—	—	—	2–1	1–1	—	1–0
Jaguaré	0–2	—	—	—	—	—	0–2	0–2	—	1–0
Nova Venécia	—	1–1	—	2–1	0–2	1–0	—	—	—	—
Porto Vitória	0–3	3–1	—	—	1–1	1–1	—	—	0–1	—
Real Noroeste	1–1	1–1	—	—	—	1–1	1–2	—	2–1	—
Rio Branco	0–0	3–0	—	—	—	—	0–0	—	1–0	1–1
Rio Branco-VN	—	—	2–0	0–1	—	—	—	1–0	1–1	1–1
Capixaba SC	—	—	2–2	1–0	0–2	2–4	—	—	—	—
Vilavelhense	0–4	1–1	2–0	—	—	—	—	1–2	—	—
Vitória	—	—	5–1	1–1	1–2	—	—	1–2	4–0	—

Updated to match(es) played on 23 February 2025. Source: ge
Legend: Blue = home team win; Yellow = draw; Red = away team win.

== Final stage ==
=== Bracket ===
Quarter-finals
1	Desportiva Ferroviária	4	2	6
8	Vilavelhense	1	1	2
4	Rio Branco	2	1	3
5	Capixaba SC	1	0	1
2	Real Noroeste	0	1	1
7	Porto Vitória	1	1	1
3	Rio Branco-VN	1	0	1 (3)
6	Vitória	1	0	1 (4)

Semi-finals
Desportiva Ferroviária	2	0	2
Rio Branco	2	1	3
Porto Vitória	0	2	2
Vitória	1	0	1

Finals
Rio Branco	0	2	2
Porto Vitória	1	0	1

=== Quarterfinals ===
5 March 2025
19:00 UTC-03:00

Vilavelhense	1–4	Desportiva Ferroviária
	Report

Estádio Engenheiro Araripe, Cariacica
8 March 2025
17:00 UTC-03:00

Desportiva Ferroviária	2–1	Vilavelhense
	Report

Estádio Engenheiro Araripe, Cariacica

6 March 2025
21:00 UTC-03:00

Rio Branco	2–1	Capixaba SC
	Report

Estádio Kléber Andrade, Cariacica
9 March 2025
19:30 UTC-03:00

Capixaba SC	0–1	Rio Branco
	Report

Estádio Emílio Nemer, Castelo

7 March 2025
19:00 UTC-03:00

Porto Vitória	1–0	Real Noroeste
	Report

Estádio Kléber Andrade, Cariacica
10 March 2025
19:00 UTC-03:00

Real Noroeste	1–1	Porto Vitória
	Report

Estádio José Olímpio da Rocha, Águia Branca

6 March 2025
18:30 UTC-03:00

Vitória	1–1	Rio Branco-VN
	Report

Estádio Salvador Costa, Vitória
9 March 2025
16:00 UTC-03:00

Rio Branco-VN	0–0	Vitória
	Report
Penalties
	3–4

Estádio Olimpio Perim, Venda Nova do Imigrante

=== Semifinals ===
15 March 2025
16:00 UTC-03:00

Rio Branco	2–2	Desportiva Ferroviária
	Report

Estádio Kleber Andrade, Cariacica
22 March 2025
17:00 UTC-03:00

Desportiva Ferroviária	0–1	Rio Branco
	Report

Estádio Engenheiro Araripe, Cariacica

17 March 2025
19:30 UTC-03:00

Porto Vitória	0–1	Vitória
	Report

Estádio Kléber Andrade, Cariacica
26 March 2025
16:00 UTC-03:00

Vitória	0–2	Porto Vitória
	Report

Estádio Salvador Costa, Vitória

=== Finals ===
29 March 2025
16:30 UTC-03:00

Porto Vitória	1–0	Rio Branco
Mariano 89' (pen.)	Report

Estádio Kléber Andrade, Cariacica
5 April 2025
16:30 UTC-03:00

Rio Branco	2–0	Porto Vitória
	Report

Estádio Kléber Andrade, Cariacica
