= Bruno Barbosa (footballer, born 1994) =

Brazilian footballer

Personal information
- Full name: Bruno Nogueira Barbosa
- Date of birth: 28 April 1994 (age 32)
- Place of birth: Pelotas, Rio Grande do Sul, Brazil
- Height: 1.76 m (5 ft 9 in)
- Position: Left-back

Youth career
- Grêmio

Senior career*
Years	Team	Apps	(Gls)
2014	Ferroviária	0	(0)
2015	Brasil de Farroupilha	1	(0)
2017	Bagé		
2018	Itapemirim	6	(0)
2019–2020	Speranța Nisporeni	26	(0)
2021	Nova Mutum	6	(0)
2021	Bagé	12	(0)
2022	Rio Branco-ES	11	(0)
2022	Americano-RJ	13	(0)
2023	Desportiva-ES	4	(0)
2023	Americano-RJ	7	(0)
2024	Rio Branco-VN	5	(1)
- * Club domestic league appearances and goals

Bruno Nogueira Barbosa (born 28 April 1994) is a Brazilian footballer.

== Career ==
Born in Pelotas in the Brazilian state of Rio Grande do Sul, Bruno Barbosa was developed in the academy of Grêmio before playing senior football for Ferroviária and Brasil de Farroupilha. Spells with Bagé and Itapemirim – where he finished runner-up of the 2018 Copa Verde – followed, before a move to Moldova to play for Speranța Nisporeni. On his return to Brazil, he featured for Nova Mutum before a return to Bagé.

Bruno Barbosa signed for Rio Branco ahead of the 2022 season, marking a return to Espírito Santo. On signing, he was quoted as saying "returning [to Espírito Santo] also makes me very happy because it's where my family, my wife, and my friends are", and expressed his happiness in reuniting with former teammates at Itapemirim, Bambu and Paulinho, who he described as being "practically neighbours".

Having spent the second half of 2022 with Americano of Rio de Janeiro, Bruno Barbosa joined rivals Desportiva ahead of the 2023 season.

== Career statistics ==
=== Club ===
As of 7 June 2026.

Appearances and goals by club, season and competition
Club	Season	League			State League		Cup (Note: Includes Copa do Brasil and Moldovan Cup)		Continental		Other		Total	
Club	Season	Division	Apps	Goals	Apps	Goals	Apps	Goals	Apps	Goals	Apps	Goals	Apps	Goals
Ferroviária	2014	–			0	0	0	0	–		4 (Note: Appearances in the Copa Paulista)	0	4	0
Brasil de Farroupilha	2015	–			1 (Note: Appearances in the Campeonato Gaúcho A2)	0	0	0	–		0	0	1	0
Itapemirim	2018	Série D	3	0	3 (Note: Appearances in the Campeonato Capixaba)	0	0	0	–		4 (Note: Appearances in the Copa Verde)	0	10	0
Speranța Nisporeni	2019	Divizia Națională	26	0	–		1	2	2 (Note: Appearances in the UEFA Europa League)	0	0	0	29	2
Nova Mutum	2021	Série D	0	0	6 (Note: Appearances in the Campeonato Mato-Grossense)	0	0	0	–		0	0	6	0
Bagé	2021	–			12	0	0	0	–		12 (Note: Appearances in the Copa FGF)	0	24	0
Rio Branco-ES	2022	–			11	0	0	0	–		0	0	11	0
Americano-RJ	2022	–			13 (Note: Appearances in the Campeonato Carioca Série A2)	0	0	0	–		7 (Note: Appearances in the Copa Rio)	1	20	1
Desportiva-ES	2023	–			4	0	0	0	–		0	0	4	0
Americano-RJ	2023	–			7	0	0	0	–		4	0	11	0
Rio Branco-VN	2024	–			5	1	0	0	–		4	0	5	1
Career total			27	0	2	0	1	2	2	0	0	0	40	2
