= Bruno Barbosa =

Bruno Barbosa may refer to:

- Bruno Barbosa (footballer, born 1985), Brazilian football manager and former striker
- Bruno Barbosa (footballer, born 1994), Brazilian football left-back
