= Porto Vitória Futebol Clube =

Brazilian football club

Porto Vitória
- Full name: Porto Vitória Futebol Clube
- Founded: 16 October 2014; 12 years ago
- Ground: Estádio Kleber Andrade
- Capacity: 21,152
- Chairman: Vinícius Coelho
- Manager: Rodrigo César
- League: Campeonato Capixaba
- 2025 2025: Série D, 42nd of 64; Capixaba, 1st of 10 (champions)
- Website: portovitoriaec.com.br
Home colours	Away colours	Third colours

Porto Vitória Futebol Clube is a Brazilian football club based in Vitória metropolitan area, Espírito Santo. Competes in Campeonato Capixaba, the Espírito Santo's premier state league, and in Campeonato Brasileiro Série D.

== History ==
The club was founded on 16 October 2014, initially focused on the youth categories. In 2021, began to compete in professional category competitions. They finished in the second position in the Campeonato Capixaba Série B (second level) in 2022, qualifying for the first time for the Campeonato Capixaba.

In 2024, the team won its first professional title, the Copa ES, defeating Vitória FC 1–0 in the final. In the same year, the club managed to win every possible official title in the youth categories of Espírito Santo, an unprecedented feat in the state.

During the semifinals of the 2026 Campeonato Capixaba, Porto Vitória completed a remarkable comeback against Vitória FC, after losing the first leg at home 0–4 and winning the second leg away 5–1, ultimately advancing to the final through a penalty shootout. In the final, Porto defeated Serra FC 4–3 on aggregate, winning their first title in the competition.

== Structure ==
Porto Vitória has its main headquarters in the city of Serra, and usually plays its games at the Estádio Kleber Andrade in Cariacica, managed by the State Government. Both cities are part of the Greater Vitória, and are no more than 30 km (18,6 miles) from the capital city of Vitória.

In 2024, the club began a project to build a training center in the city of Serra.

== Honours ==
- Campeonato Capixaba
  - Winners (1): 2026
  - Runners-up (1): 2025
- Copa ES
  - Winners (1): 2024
  - Runners-up (1): 2025
