= Rafael Soriano (football manager) =

Brazilian football manager

Personal information
- Full name: Rafael Barcelos Soriano
- Date of birth: 21 July 1985 (age 41)
- Place of birth: Campos dos Goytacazes, Brasil

Managerial career
- Years: Team
- 2007: Cardoso Moreira
- 2008: Americano
- 2013: Sampaio Corrêa-RJ
- 2014: Boavista (assistant)
- 2015–2017: Campos
- 2017–2018: Desportiva
- 2017–2018: Espírito Santo
- 2018: Itaboraí
- 2019: Serra Macaense
- 2020: Nacional de Patos
- 2020: Americano
- 2020: Inter de Limeira
- 2021: Inter de Limeira (assistant)
- 2021: Sampaio Corrêa-RJ
- 2021–2022: Desportiva
- 2022–2023: Americano
- 2024: Rio Branco de Venda Nova

Rafael Barcelos Soriano (born 21 July 1985) is a Brazilian football coach. He is currently without a club.

== Career ==
In July 2021, Soriano was announced as coach of Sampaio Corrêa.

In December 2021, Rafael took charge of Desportiva Ferroviária, to compete in the Campeonato Capixaba of the following year.

On 10 April 2022, Rafael attacked referee assistant Marcielly Netto with a headbutt, during halftime in the match against Nova Venécia, for the Campeonato Capixaba. Shortly after the incident, Desportiva announced the dismissal of the coach. The following day, Soriano was preventively suspended by the Tribunal de Justiça de Desportiva do Espírito Santo for 30 days. On 26 April, the TJE-ES sentenced the coach to a suspension of 200 days.
