= Operário Futebol Clube (disambiguation) =

Operário Futebol Clube may refer to:

- Operário Futebol Clube (Várzea Grande), Brazilian football club from Mato Grosso state
- Operário Futebol Clube (MS), Brazilian football club from Mato Grosso do Sul state, (Mato Grosso do Sul was part of Mato Grosso until the 1970s)

== See also ==
- CE Operário Várzea-Grandense
- Operário Ferroviário Esporte Clube
