= Campeonato Mato-Grossense de Futebol Feminino =

Women's football league in Mato-Grosso, Brazil

- Founded: 2007
- Country: Brazil
- Confederation: FMF
- Promotion to: Brasileiro Série A3
- Current champions: Ação (1st title) (2025)
- Most championships: Mixto (9 titles)
- Current: 2026

The Campeonato Mato-Grossense de Futebol Feminino is the women's football state championship of Mato Grosso state, and is contested since 2007.

== List of champions ==
Following is the list with all recognized titles of Campeonato Mato-Grossense Feminino:

Season	Champions	Runners-up
2007	Mixto (1)	
2008	Tangará (1)	Mixto
2009	Mixto (2)	
2010	Mixto (3)	
2011	Mixto (4)	
2012	Serra (1)	Operário Ltda.
2013	Serra (2)	
2014	Operário Ltda. (1)	
2015	Mixto (5)	
2016–2017	Not held	
2018	Operário Ltda. (2)	Mixto
2019	Operário Ltda. (3)	Mixto
2020	Mixto (6)	Ação
2021	Mixto (7)	Cuiabá
2022	Mixto (8)	Operário Várzea-Grandense
2023	Mixto (9)	Ação
2024	Operário Ltda. (4)	Ação
2025	Ação (1)	Operário Ltda.

== Titles by team ==
Teams in bold stills active.

Rank	Club	Winners	Winning years
1	**Mixto**	9	2007, 2009, 2010, 2011, 2015, 2020, 2021, 2022, 2023
2	**Operário Ltda.**	4	2014, 2018, 2019, 2024
3	Serra	2	2012, 2013
4	Tangará	1	2008
4	**Ação**	1	2025

=== By city ===
City	Championships	Clubs
Cuiabá	9	Mixto (9)
Várzea Grande	4	Operário Ltda. (4)
Tangará da Serra	3	AA Serra (2), Tangará (1)
Santo Antônio de Leverger	1	Ação (1)
