= Rio Branco Atlético Clube =

Brazilian football club

Rio Branco
- Full name: Rio Branco Atlético Clube
- Nicknames: Capa Preta (Black Cape); Brancão (Big White)
- Founded: 21 June 1913; 113 years ago
- Ground: Estádio Kleber Andrade
- Capacity: 21,152
- SAF owner: T2R Sports (90%); Rio Branco AC (10%)
- Head coach: Cícero Júnior
- League: Campeonato Brasileiro Série D Campeonato Capixaba
- 2025 2025: Série D, 12th of 64; Capixaba, 2nd of 10
- Website: site.riobrancoes.com.br
Home colors	Away colors

Rio Branco Atlético Clube is a Brazilian professional football club based in Vitória metropolitan area, Espírito Santo. Founded on 21 June 1913, it plays its home games at Estádio Kleber Andrade in Cariacica. Competes in the Campeonato Capixaba, the Espírito Santo state league, and in the Campeonato Brasileiro Série D.

Rio Branco holds the record for titles in Espírito Santo, with 39 state league titles and 1 Copa ES title. The club has participated in 13 editions of the Campeonato Brasileiro Série A.

== History ==
The young students Antonio Miguez, José Batista Pavão and Edmundo Martins decided to found a team to play football, because they had been prevented from playing in other clubs of the city's financial elite. For this, other sports lovers were called and the meeting took place on June 21, 1913, at house number 37, on Rua 7 de Setembro, in downtown Vitória. The team was born, and since all the founders were between 14 and 16 years old, the name chosen was Juventude e Vigor (Youth and Vigor). The colors were initially green and yellow, in reference to Brazil. Shortly after, the boys matured and decided to change the name. The decision, at a meeting held on February 10, 1914, was quick: they chose to honor Chancellor José Maria da Silva Paranhos Júnior, known as the Baron of Rio Branco, who was responsible for the modernization of the country at the time. With that, the name was changed to Rio Branco Football Club. In May 1917, the colors were replaced by black and white, because the green and yellow were fading too much on the uniform. The new colors were suggested by player Gilberto Paixão, who was greatly admired by his teammates.

The team began competing in the Campeonato Capixaba in 1917, at the time known as the Taça Cidade de Vitória. In its first participation, Rio Branco reached the final decision, losing the title to América FC. In 1918, the team had revenge against América in the final decision and won its first championship. Rio Branco would also be champion of the following edition in 1919 against Vitória FC.

In the 1920s, the capital's teams played on a field in Jucutuquara neighborhood, known as the Estádio do Zinco (Zinc Stadium), as it was surrounded by zinc sheets. In 1933, Vitória FC announced plans to build a stadium in the same space, but due to political force, Rio Branco won the battle and, between 1934 and 1936, built the Estádio Governador Bley, which was named after the interventor João Punaro Bley, who governed the state of Espírito Santo after the Revolution of 1930. This stadium was the scene of many achievements in the history of Rio Branco, such as the sixth state league titles between 1934–1939, the six titles in the 40s and four more in the 50s. In 1939, Rio Branco Football Club ended as an institution, but was “refounded” as Riobranquinho and, 16 months later, in 1941, adopted the name it still has today: Rio Branco Atlético Clube.

In 1972, Rio Branco sold the Estádio Governador Bley to the Federal Technical School. In 1983, Rio Branco built the Estádio Kleber Andrade, named in honor of the club's president, Kleber Andrade, the project's creator.

Rio Branco had a good campaign in the 1937 Torneio dos Campeões. The highlight of the campaign was a 4–3 victory over Fluminense. In August 2023, the CBF approved this competition as the first edition of the Campeonato Brasileiro Série A. Rio Branco was in third place, having the best position of a club from Espírito Santo in the Brazilian top division. Alcy Simões, the club's all-time top scorer with 213 goals, was in the squad at the time.

In 2024, Rio Branco became a Sociedade Anônima do Futebol (SAF). In its first year with the new management model, the club returned to being state champion after eight years, and returned to compete in national competitions.

== Crest and colours ==
Rio Branco was originally called Juventude e Vigor, and wore green and yellow uniforms in homage to Brazil. The club had no crest, just a green and yellow flag, which featured a soccer ball and an air pump. In 1917, it was renamed Rio Branco Football Club and adopted a predominantly white shield, with black stripes that meet in the central part of the shield, on which the acronym "RBFC" is written. When the club changed its name to Rio Branco Atlético Clube, it also changed the acronym inside the crest to "RBAC", keeping the predominant white color. The next significant change would be the adoption of black as the primary color on the crest, which would also see the acronyms removed, for the introduction of the name "Rio Branco". However, the idea did not last long. With the same shield, the eternal acronym "RBAC" would return. The shape received more curves and the central circle was reduced.

== Structure ==
Rio Branco was founded and still has its main headquarters in the capital city of Vitória. In 1983, the club built the Estádio Kleber Andrade in the nearby city of Cariacica, and in 2008 sold the stadium to the State Government, but it usually still plays its home games there.

In 1993, the city of Serra donated an area of 60,000 m^{2} to Rio Branco to build its training center. In 2014, the Serra city hall blocked the area because Rio Branco had not fulfilled its obligation to build a training center and a social headquarters on the site.

The three cities are part of the Greater Vitória, and, together, correspond to a radius of approximately 30 km (18,6 miles).

== Rivalries ==
Rio Branco's oldest rival, dating back to 1913 when the club still played its home games in Vitória, is Vitória FC. The rivalry between the two, known as Vi–Rio, is one of the oldest in the state.

Desportiva Ferroviária is another rival from Cariacica. The two clubs together dominated football in Espírito Santo between the 1960s and 1980s. They won fourteen consecutive Campeonato Capixaba between 1964 and 1975, and again ten consecutive titles between 1977 and 1986.

== Honours ==
=== State ===
- Campeonato Capixaba (record)
  - Winners (39): 1918, 1919, 1921, 1924, 1929, 1930, 1934, 1935, 1936, 1937, 1938, 1939, 1941, 1942, 1945, 1946, 1947, 1949, 1951, 1957, 1958, 1959, 1962, 1963, 1966, 1968, 1969, 1970, 1971, 1973, 1975, 1978, 1982, 1983, 1985, 2010, 2015, 2024, 2025
  - Runners-up (16): 1917, 1927, 1928, 1940, 1960, 1964, 1965, 1967, 1972, 1974, 1976, 1977, 1988, 2002, 2009, 2020
- Copa ES
  - Winners (1): 2016
  - Runners-up (6): 2003, 2008, 2009, 2012, 2022, 2023
- Campeonato Capixaba Série B
  - Winners (2): 2005, 2018

=== Inter-state ===
- Copa Centro-Oeste
  - Runners-up (1): 2026

=== Other ===
- Taça Cidade de Vitória
  - Winners (27): 1918, 1919, 1921, 1924, 1929, 1930, 1934, 1935, 1936, 1937, 1938, 1939, 1941, 1942, 1945, 1946, 1947, 1949, 1951, 1957, 1958, 1959, 1964, 1965, 1967, 1969, 1971
- Torneio Início
  - Winners (24): 1918, 1920, 1921, 1924, 1925, 1928, 1929, 1930, 1931, 1932, 1934, 1935, 1936, 1940, 1942, 1947, 1956, 1957, 1959, 1962, 1964, 1968, 1969, 1970
