= Tangará Esporte Clube =

Brazilian football club

Tangará
- Full name: Tangará Esporte Clube
- Founded: February 22, 1991
- Ground: Estádio Municipal de Tangará da Serra, Tangará da Serra, Mato Grosso state, Brazil
- Capacity: 5,000
Home colours	Away colours

Tangará Esporte Clube, commonly known as Tangará, is a Brazilian football club based in Tangará da Serra, Mato Grosso state.

== History ==
The club was founded on January 22, 1991. They competed in the Campeonato Mato-Grossense in 1994 and in 1995.

== Honours ==
=== Women's Football ===
- Campeonato Mato-Grossense de Futebol Feminino
  - Winners (1): 2008

== Stadium ==
Tangará Esporte Clube play their home games at Estádio Municipal de Tangará da Serra. The stadium has a maximum capacity of 5,000 people.
