= Associação Desportiva Itaboraí =

Brazilian football club

Itaboraí
- Full name: Associação Desportiva Itaboraí
- Nickname(s): Azulão; Águia do Leste Fluminense
- Founded: 30 July 1976
- Ground: Alzirão
- Capacity: 900
- Chairman: Hebson Barreto Cardozo Júnior
- Head coach: Rafael Soriano
- League: Campeonato Carioca Série B2
- 2019 2019: Série D, 52nd Carioca B1, 16th (relegated)
| Home colours | Away colours |

Associação Desportiva Itaboraí is a Brazilian football team from the city of Itaboraí, Rio de Janeiro state, founded on 30 June 1976.

== Stadium ==
The home stadium Alziro Almeida has a capacity of 900 people. The stadium is also known as Alzirão.

== Honours ==
- Campeonato Carioca Série B1:
  - Winners (1): 2015

== Managerial history ==
- Valdir Bigode (2011)
