= Rafael (footballer, born 1987) =

Brazilian footballer

Personal information
- Full name: Rafael da Silva Gomes
- Date of birth: 1 October 1987 (age 39)
- Place of birth: Jaboatão dos Guararapes, Brazil
- Height: 1.87 m (6 ft 2 in)
- Position: Defender

Senior career*
| Years | Team | Apps | (Gls) |
- Jaguaré
| 2013–2014 | Al-Hilal | | |
| 2014 | Pesqueira | 0 | (0) |
| 2015 | Mqabba | | |
| 2016–2017 | América-PE | 8 | (0) |
| 2017–2018 | Żebbuġ Rangers | | |
| 2018–2019 | Mqabba | | |
- * Club domestic league appearances and goals as of 19:55, 10 July 2019 (UTC)

Rafael da Silva Gomes (born 1 October 1987), commonly known as Rafael, is a Brazilian footballer who plays as a defender.

== Career statistics ==
=== Club ===
As of 10 July 2019.

| Club | Season | League | | | State League | | Cup | | Other | | Total | |
| Club | Season | Division | Apps | Goals | Apps | Goals | Apps | Goals | Apps | Goals | Apps | Goals |
|---|---|---|---|---|---|---|---|---|---|---|---|---|
| Pesqueira | 2014 | – | | | 7 (Note: Appearances in the Campeonato Pernambucano) | 0 | 0 | 0 | 0 | 0 | 7 | 0 |
| América-PE | 2016 | Série D | 8 | 0 | 0 | 0 | 0 | 0 | 0 | 0 | 8 | 0 |
| América-PE | 2017 | Série D | 0 | 0 | 2 | 0 | 0 | 0 | 0 | 0 | 2 | 0 |
| América-PE | Total | | 8 | 0 | 2 | 0 | 0 | 0 | 0 | 0 | 10 | 0 |
| Career total | | | 8 | 0 | 9 | 0 | 0 | 0 | 0 | 0 | 17 | 0 |
