= Sociedade Ação Futebol =

Brazilian football club

Ação
- Full name: Sociedade Ação Futebol
- Nickname: Tuiuiú Pantaneiro
- Founded: 31 August 2007; 18 years ago
- Ground: Bugrinho
- Capacity: 3,000
- President: Lerivom Pereira Rodrigues
- Head coach: Odil Soares
- League: Campeonato Mato-Grossense
- 2021: Mato-Grossense, 3rd of 10
- Website: https://www.acaofc.com/
Home colours	Away colours

Sociedade Ação Futebol, often known as Ação, is a Brazilian football team from Santo Antônio de Leverger, Mato Grosso. Founded on 31 August 2007, the club plays in the Campeonato Mato-Grossense.

== History ==
Founded on 31 August 2007, Ação started playing in the Campeonato Mato-Grossense immediately in 2008, but suffered relegation and played in the second division in the same year. The club then spent two years inactive before returning in 2011 in the second level, but missed out promotion in the semifinals.

After not playing any competitions in 2012, 2013 and 2014, Ação featured in the second tier in 2015, finishing fourth. Another two years of inactivity followed, as the club returned immediately to the first division in 2018, but was immediately relegated.

Ação played in the second division in 2019 and 2020, achieving promotion as champions in the latter campaign. In 2021, in their third participation in the first division, the club finished in the third place and assured a spot in the 2022 Série D for the first time ever.

== Honours ==
=== State ===
- Campeonato Mato-Grossense Second Division
  - Winners (1): 2020

=== Women's Football ===
- Campeonato Mato-Grossense de Futebol Feminino
  - Winners (1): 2025
