= Greater Vitória =

Coordinates: 20.3189°S 40.3378°W

Greater Vitória Região Metropolitana da Grande Vitória
- Metropolitan area
- Metropolitan Region of Greater Vitória
- Country: Brazil
- State: Espírito Santo
- Established: February 21, 1995

Area
  - Total: 2,331.03 km^{2} (900.02 sq mi)

Population
  - Estimate (2022): 1,880,828

Greater Vitória (Região Metropolitana da Grande Vitória) is a metropolitan area in Espírito Santo, Brazil. It is made up of the following municipalities: Cariacica, Fundão, Guarapari, Serra, Vitória, Vila Velha, and Viana and according to IBGE it covers an area of 2,331.01 km^{2} with 1,880,828 inhabitants (2022). It was established on February 21, 1995, when it was known as the Metropolitan Region of Vitória (RMV, Região Metropolitana de Vitória), and later modified in 1999 and 2001, when it was renamed and it incorporated the municipalities of Guarapari and Fundão respectively. These seven municipalities are home to almost half of the total population of Espírito Santo (49%) and 57% of the state's urban population. They produce 58% of the wealth and consume 95% of the electricity.

The term "Greater Vitória" corresponds mainly to the area centered on Vitória, the capital of Espírito Santo, Brazil. Today, the greatest part of industrial development is occurring in the Serra municipality, where many industries are building depots and factories. Those take advantage of the 3 Ports, Vitória Airport and the proximity to the ring road, which goes right though Serra, to distribute their products.
