= Rio Branco Futebol Clube =

Brazilian football team

Rio Branco-VN
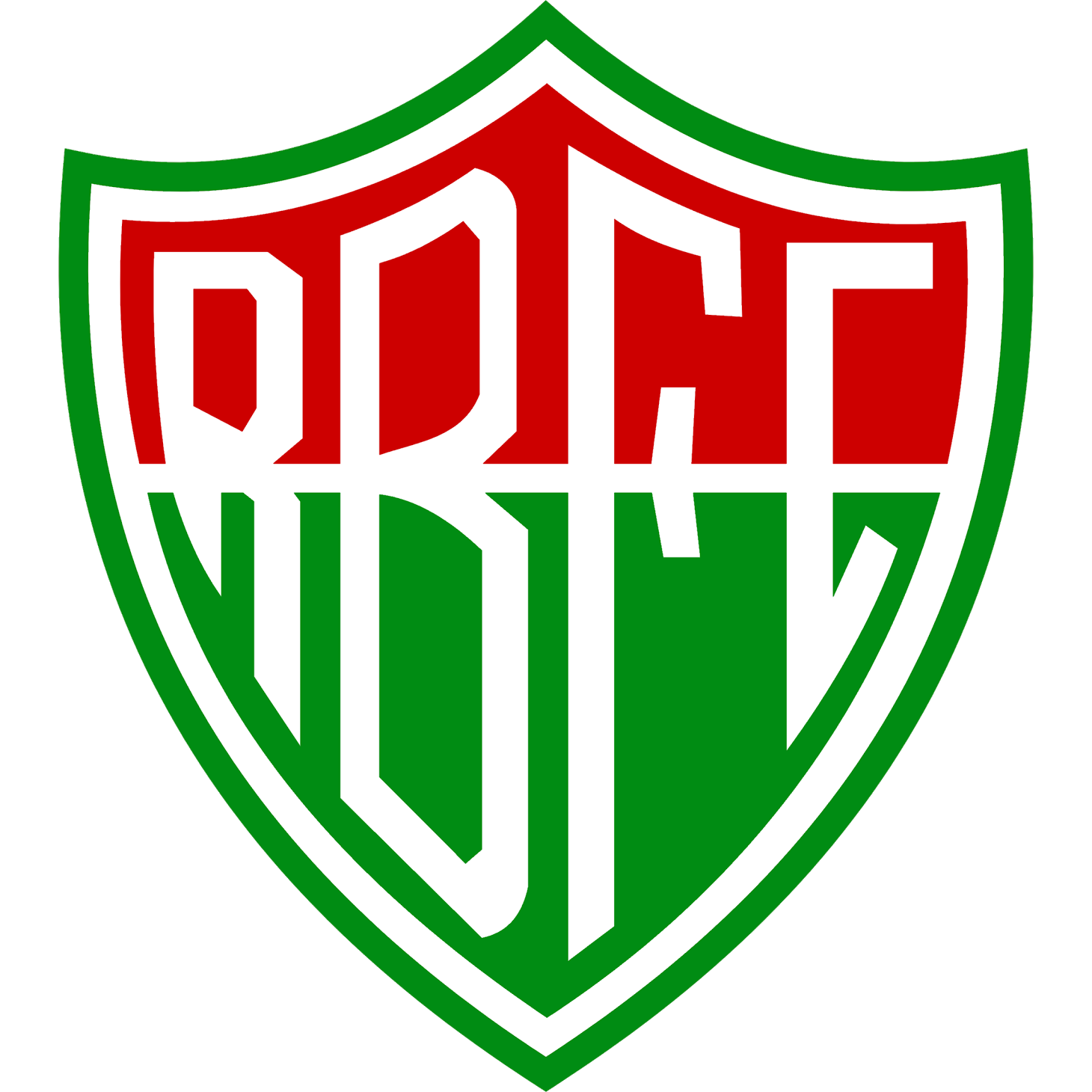
- Full name: Rio Branco Futebol Clube
- Nickname: Tricolor Serrano (Tricolor of the Mountain Range)
- Founded: 29 June 1945; 81 years ago
- Ground: Estádio Olímpio Perim
- Capacity: 2,100
- President: Erivelton Uliana
- Head coach: Mauro Soares
- League: Campeonato Capixaba
- 2025: Capixaba, 6th of 10
Home colours	Away colours

Rio Branco Futebol Clube, known as Rio Branco-VN or Rio Branco de Venda Nova, is a Brazilian football club based in Venda Nova do Imigrante, in the state of Espírito Santo. Founded in 1945, the club plays in the Campeonato Capixaba, the Espírito Santo's premier state league. Holds your home matches at the Estádio Olímpio Perim, with a capacity of 2,100 spectators.

Rio Branco-VN is currently ranked third among Espírito Santo teams in 2022 CBF's national club ranking at 131st place overall. They are the best placed team in the state from outside of Vitória.

== History ==
Founded on 29 June 1945 by a group of friends, Rio Branco only started to play professionally in 1993, winning the Campeonato Capixaba Série B. In 1995, in their second season in the Campeonato Capixaba, the club reached the finals but lost to Linhares EC. In 1999, after suffering relegation, Rio Branco ceased first team activities, but kept their youth categories.

The professional squad only returned to the competitions in 2016, in the second division. In 2017, the club returned to the first division after 19 years, after finishing second in the second level. In their return to the first division, Rio Branco was knocked out in the semifinals in 2018 and in the quarterfinals in 2019, before lifting the trophy for the first time in 2020. They also qualified for the 2021 Campeonato Brasileiro Série D, 2021 Copa Verde and the 2021 Copa do Brasil.

In 2026, Rio Branco finished the Campeonato Capixaba in the relegation zone—a stark contrast to their victorious campaign in the Copa ES. Consequently, in 2027, Rio Branco became the first team to compete in the Campeonato Brasileiro Série D while simultaneously participating in the Campeonato Capixaba Série B.

== Honours ==
- Campeonato Capixaba
  - Winners (1): 2020
  - Runners-up (3): 1995, 2021, 2024
- Copa ES
  - Winners (1): 2026
- Campeonato Capixaba Série B
  - Winners (1): 1993
