= Várzea Grande Esporte Clube =

Várzea Grande EC
- Full name: Várzea Grande Esporte Clube
- Founded: 8 August 2002; 23 years ago
- Ground: Estádio Dito Souza
- Capacity: 2,600
- Chairman: Atahide Mello
- Head coach: Rodolfo Kupper
- League: Campeonato Mato-Grossense
- 2025: Mato-Grossense Segunda Divisão, 2nd of 10 (promoted)
Home colours	Away colours

Várzea Grande Esporte Clube, formerly known as Operário Futebol Clube, is a Brazilian football team from Várzea Grande, Mato Grosso, founded on 8 August 2002. The club played in the Campeonato Brasileiro Série C once, in 2006.

== History ==
Logo utilized until 2017.

The club was founded on 8 August 2002 in the place of Esporte Clube Operário, which was then founded in 1994 to replace dissolved side CE Operário Várzea-Grandense. After inheriting ECO's place, the club played in the 2003 Copa do Brasil and was knocked out by Palmeiras.

In 2005, Operário lifted their first trophy by winning the year's Copa FMF, after defeating Mixto in the finals. They also won the Campeonato Mato-Grossense in the following year, after defeating Barra do Garças, and played in the ensuing Campeonato Brasileiro Série C.

In 2009, after the latter returned to an active status, a merger proposal was lifted, but the move did not materialize. In that year, Operário FC played in the first division, while CEOV played in the second division. CEOV was again licensed in 2010, as Operário finished second in that year's Matogrossense.

Both CEOV and Operário FC faced each other in 2013, 2016, 2017 and 2019; both were playing in the second division in the first encounters, while the remaining ones all took part in the first division. In 2017, after being relegated to the second level, Operário was sold through a social media.

Logo used between 2021 and 2025

In 2018, Operário FC changed colours to differentiate from CEOV. In 2019, after being relegated from the first division, Operário chose not to play in the 2020 second division.

Starting in 2023, under the presidency of Atahide Mello, the club began a process of sporting and administrative restructuring, with investments in youth development and women's football. As a result, the team achieved state titles and secured historic qualifications for national competitions.

Among the main results of the new management are:

- Mato Grosso State Championship Under-17 — Champions (2023)
- Mato Grosso State Championship Under-11 — Champions (2024)
- Mato Grosso Women's State Championship — Champions (2024)
- Mato Grosso State Championship Second Division — Runners-up (2025)
- Mato Grosso Women's State Championship — Runners-up (2025)

In addition to state achievements, the club also secured qualification for national women's competitions:

- Promotion to the Brazilian Women's Championship Série A3 — 2025
- Promotion to the Brazilian Women's Championship Série A3 — 2026
- Qualification for the Copa do Brasil Under-17 — 2024
- Qualification for the Copa do Brasil Feminina — 2025
- Qualification for the Copa do Brasil Feminina — 2026

These results marked the consolidation of the club’s sporting project during the new management period, with emphasis on strengthening the youth academy and the women’s football program.

In 2025, the club changed its name to Várzea Grande EC, differentiating itself once and for all from CEOV. The club's president, Atahide Mello, says the change aims to enhance the city of Várzea Grande.

== Women's team ==
The club's women's team took part in the 2020 Campeonato Brasileiro de Futebol Feminino Série A2, after winning the Campeonato Mato-Grossense de Futebol Feminino in the previous year.

== Honours ==
=== State ===
- Campeonato Mato-Grossense
  - Winners (1): 2006
  - Runners-up (2): 2005, 2010
- Copa FMF
  - Winners (1): 2005
- Campeonato Mato-Grossense Second Division
  - Winners (2): 2015, 2018
  - Runners-up (1): 2025

=== Women's Football ===
- Campeonato Mato-Grossense de Futebol Feminino
  - Winners (4): 2014, 2018, 2019, 2024
  - Runners-up (1): 2025
