= Estádio Engenheiro Araripe =

Football stadium in Cariacica, Brazil

Coordinates: 20°20′04″S 40°21′21″W

Estádio Engenheiro Alencar de Araripe
- Estádio Engenheiro Araripe
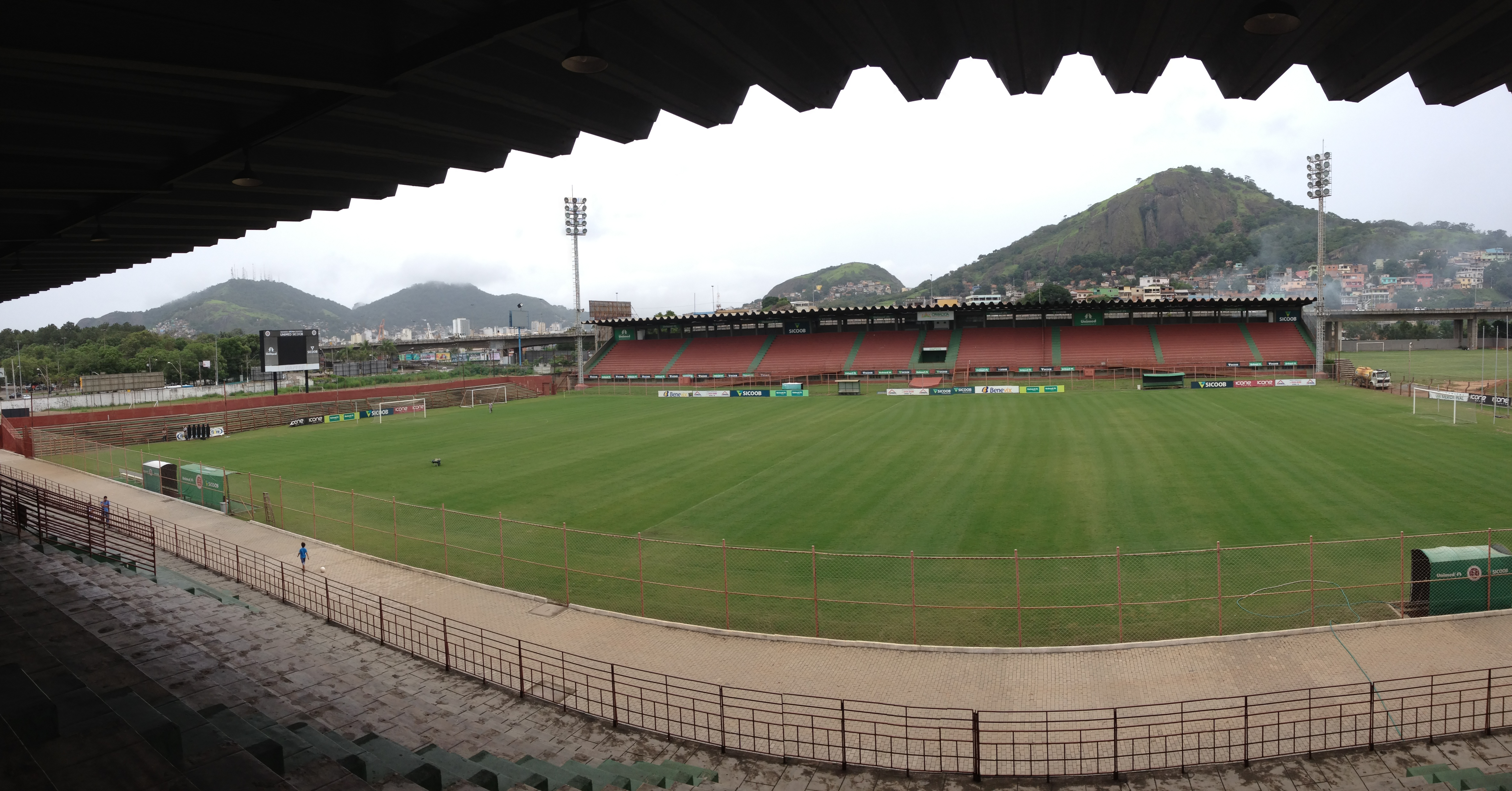
- Sisbrace
- Interactive map of Estádio Engenheiro Alencar de Araripe
- Full name: Estádio Engenheiro Alencar de Araripe
- Location: Cariacica, Espírito Santo, Brazil
- Capacity: 7,700
- Surface: Grass

Construction
- Opened: January 16, 1966

Tenant
- Desportiva Ferroviária (1966–present)

Estádio Engenheiro Alencar de Araripe, also known as Estádio Engenheiro Araripe, is a Brazilian football stadium in Cariacica, Espírito Santo. It has a capacity of 7,700 spectators. It is the home of Desportiva Ferroviária.

== International matches ==
On June 26, 1996, the Brazil national team won a friendly match 3–1 against Poland at the stadium.

The stadium was used by the Australia national team to train before and during the 2014 FIFA World Cup.
