= Associação Desportiva Ferroviária Vale do Rio Doce =

Desportiva Ferroviária
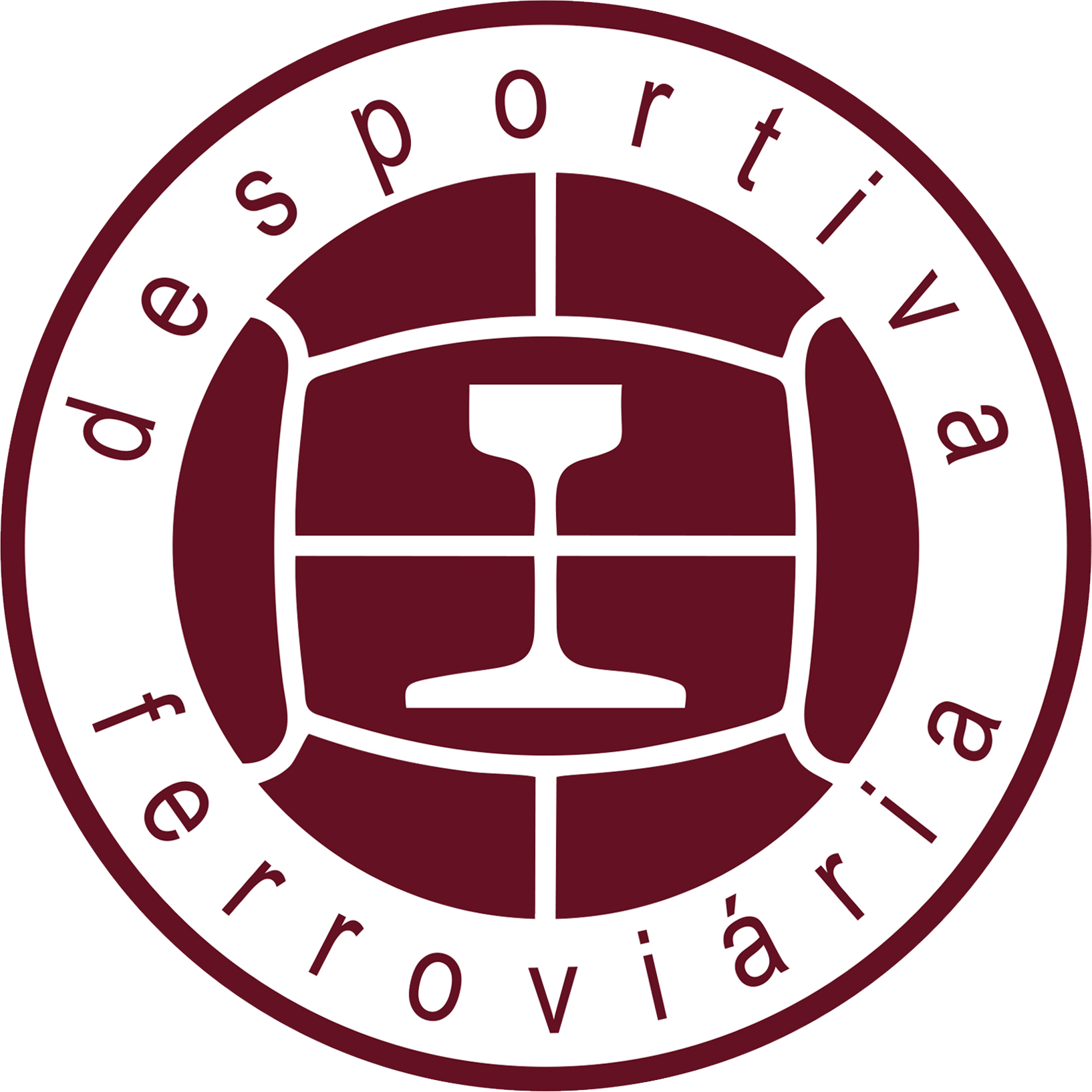
- Full name: Associação Desportiva Ferroviária Vale do Rio Doce
- Nicknames: Tiva; Locomotiva Grená
- Founded: June 17, 1963; 63 years ago
- Ground: Estádio Engenheiro Araripe
- Capacity: 7,700
- President: Wilson de Jesus
- Head coach: Rafael Soriano
- League: Campeonato Capixaba
- 2025: Capixaba, 3rd of 10
- Website: desportivaferroviaria.com.br/site/
Home colors	Away colors

Associação Desportiva Ferroviária Vale do Rio Doce (English: Vale do Rio Doce Railway Sports Association), usually known as Desportiva Ferroviária, is a Brazilian football club from Cariacica, Espírito Santo. It hosts its home games at the Estádio Engenheiro Araripe, which has a capacity of 7,700 spectators.

== History ==
Desportiva Ferroviária was founded on June 17, 1963, following the merger of six clubs where employees of the railway division of Companhia Vale do Rio Doce used to play. The merger was proposed by the company itself, with the aim of concentrating financial investment into a single football team. In 1964, the club won its first professional title, the Campeonato Capixaba. The club only adopted maroon jerseys in 1965, inspired by the colors of the locomotives that ran the route from city of Vitória to the state of Minas Gerais.

In 1974, Desportiva competed in the Campeonato Brasileiro Série A for the first time. The club finished in the 34th position. In 1980, the club competed again, finishing in the 15th place. That was the club's all-time best campaign in the high-level competition. In 1993, Desportiva returned to competition in the national top division, finishing in the 29th position.

On April 19, 1999, the club became a private company, and changed its name to Desportiva Capixaba. The senior partner was Frannel Distribuidora de Combustível, later replaced by Grupo Villa-Forte due to Frannel's bankruptcy.

On April 8, 2011, the club was renamed back to Associação Desportiva Ferroviária Vale do Rio Doce.

== Club colours ==
The club's colors are grenadine red and white. The club's home kit is composed of grenadine red shirts with white details, grenadine red shorts and white socks.

Desportiva Ferroviária's mascot is a locomotive sharing the club's colors.

== Stadium ==
Desportiva Ferroviária's home stadium is Engenheiro Alencar Araripe stadium, inaugurated in 1966, with a maximum capacity of 22,600 people.

== Honours ==
- Campeonato Capixaba
  - Winners (18): 1964, 1965, 1967, 1972, 1974, 1977, 1979, 1980, 1981, 1984, 1986, 1989, 1992, 1994, 1996, 2000, 2013, 2016
  - Runners-up (11): 1968, 1969, 1970, 1971, 1973, 1975, 1978, 1983, 1985, 1991, 2015
- Copa ES
  - Winners (2): 2008, 2012
  - Runners-up (1): 2011
- Copa dos Campeões (record)
  - Winners (1): 2014
  - Runners-up (1): 2013
- Campeonato Capixaba Série B
  - Winners (2): 2007, 2012
  - Runners-up (1): 2013

=== Other ===
- Taça Cidade de Vitória
  - Winners (2): 1966, 1968
- Torneio Início
  - Winners (1): 1967
