= Venda Nova do Imigrante =

- Municipality
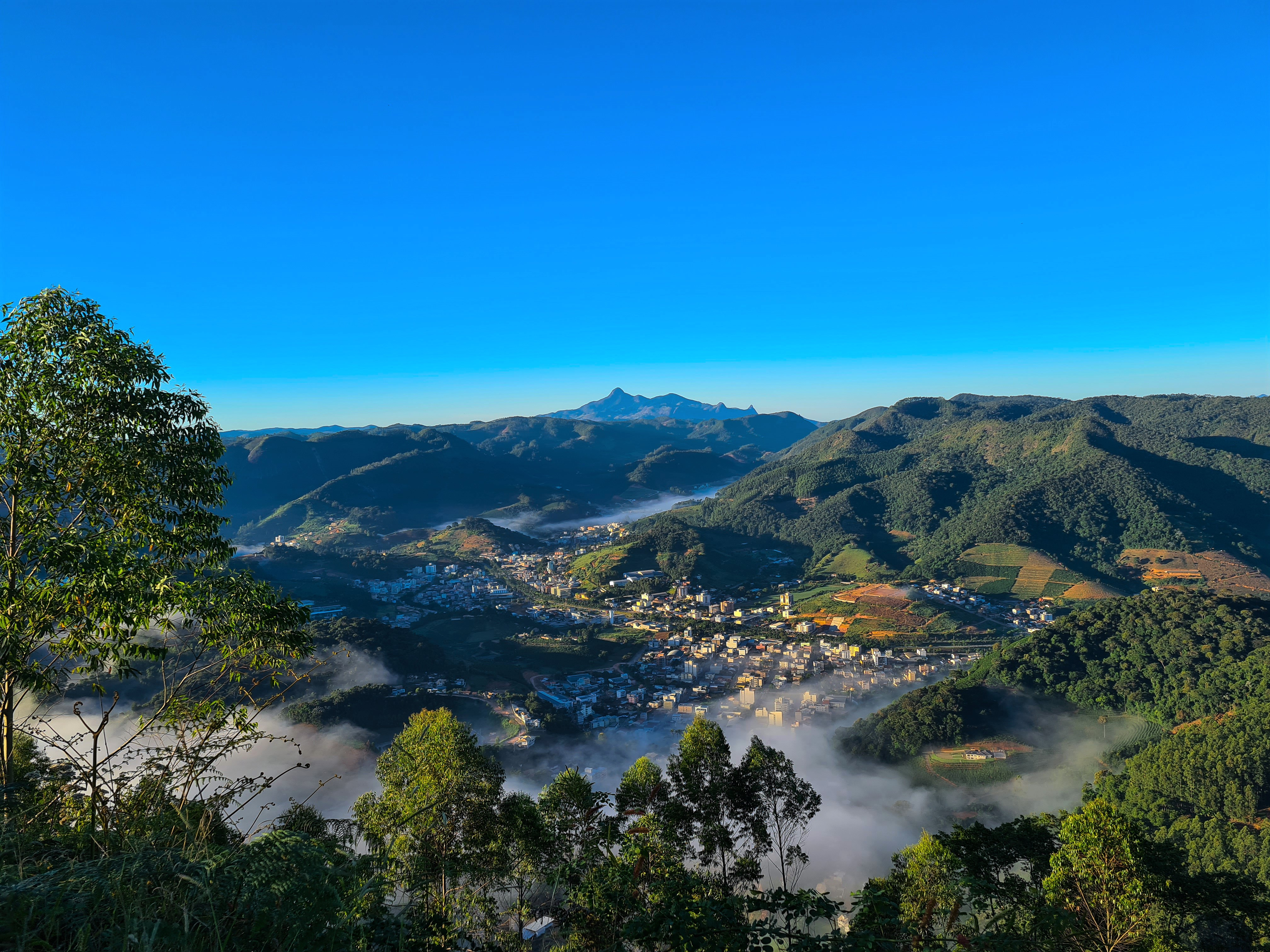

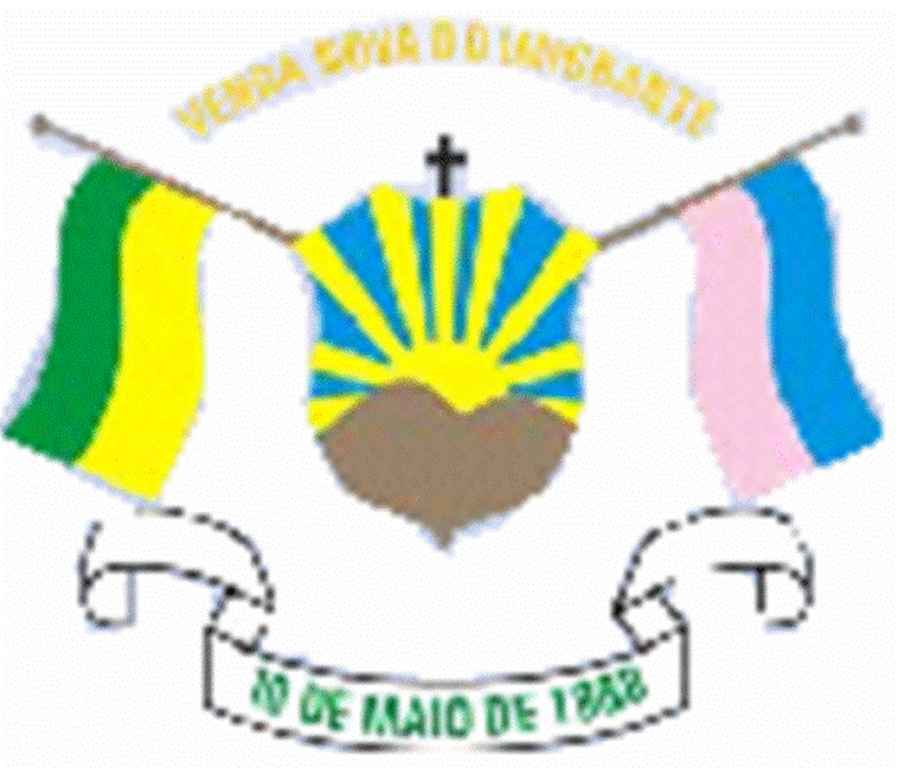
- Flag Coat of arms

- Location in Espírito Santo state

- Location in Brazil
- Coordinates: 20°20′24″S 41°8′6″W
- Country: Brazil
- Region: Southeast
- State: Espírito Santo

Area
  - Total: 185.9 km^{2} (71.8 sq mi)

Population (2020)
  - Total: 25,745
  - Density: 138.5/km^{2} (358.7/sq mi)
- Time zone: UTC−3 (BRT)

Venda Nova do Imigrante is a municipality, with a capital of the same name, in east central Espírito Santo, Brazil. Created in 1989, by separating from Conceição do Castelo, it stands at a height of 630 meters above sea level. Its population was 25,745 (2020) and its area is 185.9 km^{2}.

It was mainly colonised by northern Italian immigrants and still holds Italian-themed festivals such as the Polenta festival and wine festivals. Other such traditions still held on to are traditional Italian dancing and choral singing, often seen during such festivals.

== Geography ==
Bordering municipalities include: (E) Domingos Martins, (N) Afonso Claudio, (W) Conceição do Castelo and Castelo in the south.

=== Climate ===
Climate data for Venda Nova do Imigrante (1981–2010)
Month	Jan	Feb	Mar	Apr	May	Jun	Jul	Aug	Sep	Oct	Nov	Dec	Year
Mean daily maximum °C (°F)	29.6 (85.3)	30.2 (86.4)	28.6 (83.5)	27.2 (81.0)	25.2 (77.4)	24.4 (75.9)	23.9 (75.0)	24.7 (76.5)	25.1 (77.2)	26.9 (80.4)	27.1 (80.8)	28.6 (83.5)	26.8 (80.2)
Daily mean °C (°F)	22.6 (72.7)	22.9 (73.2)	22.2 (72.0)	20.8 (69.4)	18.7 (65.7)	17.6 (63.7)	17.1 (62.8)	17.3 (63.1)	18.6 (65.5)	20.2 (68.4)	21.0 (69.8)	21.9 (71.4)	20.1 (68.2)
Mean daily minimum °C (°F)	17.4 (63.3)	17.3 (63.1)	17.0 (62.6)	15.8 (60.4)	13.5 (56.3)	11.6 (52.9)	10.9 (51.6)	11.2 (52.2)	13.3 (55.9)	14.8 (58.6)	16.0 (60.8)	16.9 (62.4)	14.6 (58.3)
Average precipitation mm (inches)	224.8 (8.85)	103.6 (4.08)	203.4 (8.01)	118.1 (4.65)	52.8 (2.08)	31.2 (1.23)	32.6 (1.28)	35.7 (1.41)	60.0 (2.36)	111.3 (4.38)	205.5 (8.09)	277.6 (10.93)	1,456.6 (57.35)
Average precipitation days (≥ 1.0 mm)	12	9	13	11	7	5	6	6	8	10	15	16	118
Average relative humidity (%)	77.6	76.4	79.7	82.1	84.2	84.9	84.9	82.7	82.5	80.4	81.3	79.9	81.4
Mean monthly sunshine hours	170.1	177.1	155.8	159.2	161.4	169.7	172.3	174.6	134.6	140.2	121.2	125.7	1,861.9
Source: Instituto Nacional de Meteorologia

== See also ==
- List of municipalities in Espírito Santo
