= Estádio Kleber Andrade =

Football stadium in Cariacica, Brazil

Coordinates: 20°19′58″S 40°23′7″W

Estádio Estadual Kleber José de Andrade
- Estádio Kleber Andrade
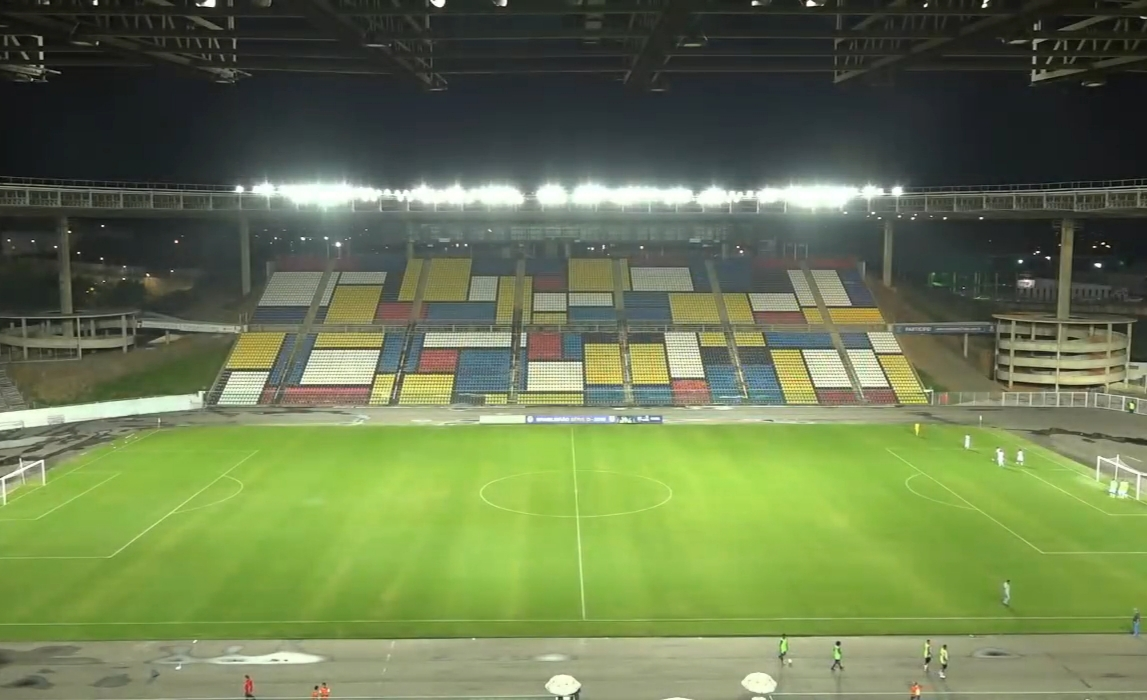
- Interactive map of Estádio Estadual Kleber José de Andrade
- Location: Cariacica, Espírito Santo, Brazil
- Owner: Espírito Santo State Government
- Capacity: 21,152
- Surface: Grass
- Record attendance: 32,328 (Rio Branco 1–0 Vasco da Gama, September 21, 1986)

Construction
- Opened: September 7, 1983
- Renovated: 2010–2014

Estádio Estadual Kleber José de Andrade, also known as Estádio Kleber Andrade, is a Brazilian football stadium located in Cariacica, Espírito Santo. The stadium was built in 1983 by Rio Branco AC and owned by the Espírito Santo State Government since 2008. Its able to hold 21,152 people.

The stadium is named after Kleber José de Andrade, who was the president of Rio Branco AC during the stadium construction.

The painting of the stadium seats was inspired by the works of Dutch painter Piet Mondrian.

== History ==
In the 1970s, Rio Branco AC closed down its stadium, Estádio Governador Bley, which had a maximum capacity of approximately 15,000 people. The new stadium construction started some time after that.

In 1983, the works on Estádio Kléber Andrade were completed. The inaugural match was played on September 7 of that year, when Rio Branco AC beat Guarapari EC 3–2. The first goal of the stadium was scored by Rio Branco's Arildo Ratão.

The stadium's attendance record currently stands at 32,328, set on September 21, 1986 when Rio Branco beat Vasco da Gama 1–0 in a match for the Campeonato Brasileiro Série A. Some people say, that actually about 50,000 were in the stadium.

It was sold to the Espírito Santo State Government in 2008.

=== 2014 World Cup ===
The stadium was used by the Cameroon national team to train before and during the 2014 World Cup.

=== 2019 U-17 World Cup ===
It is used as one of the four venues of the 2019 FIFA U-17 World Cup.
