= Cariacica =

- Municipality
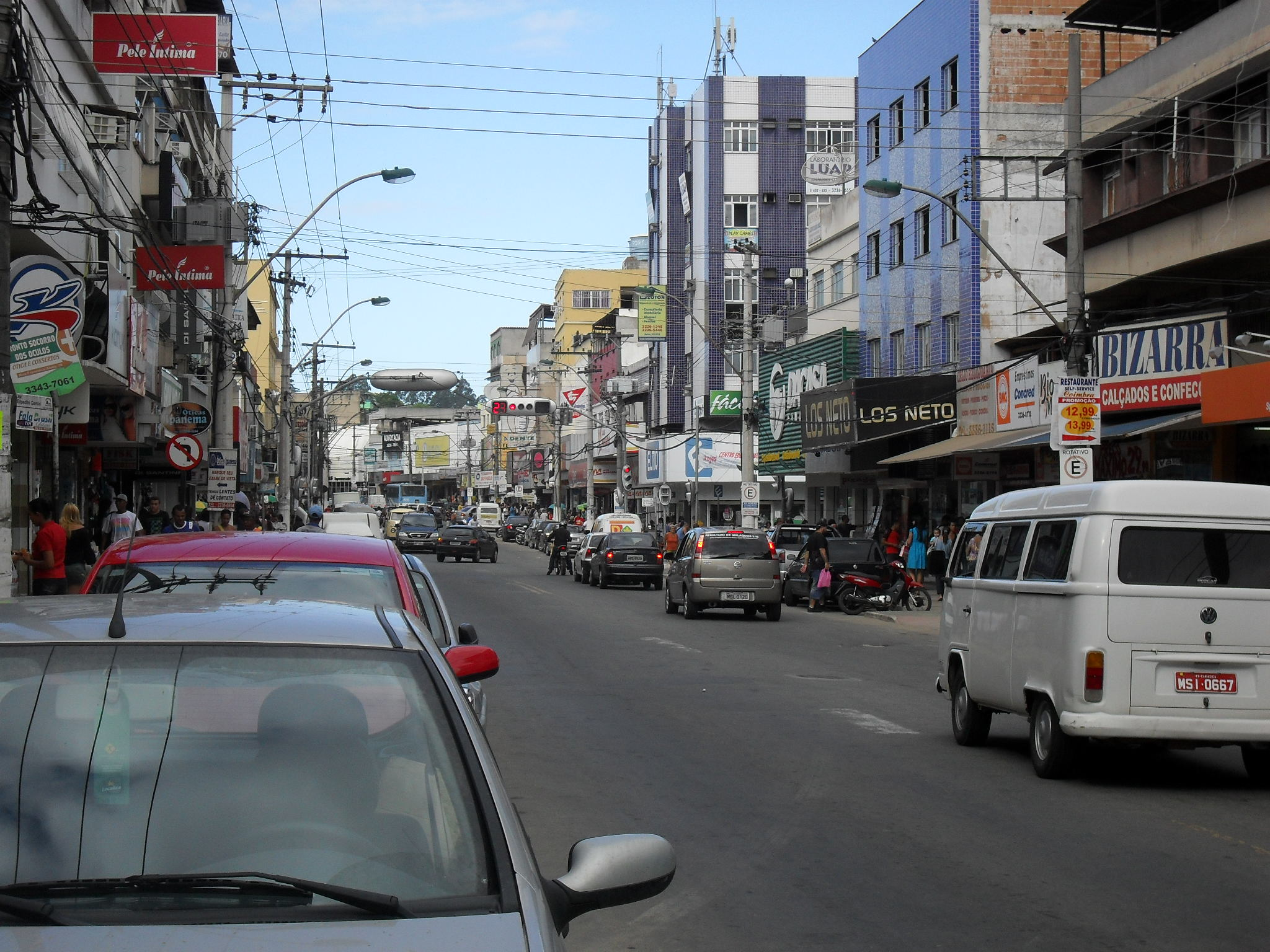

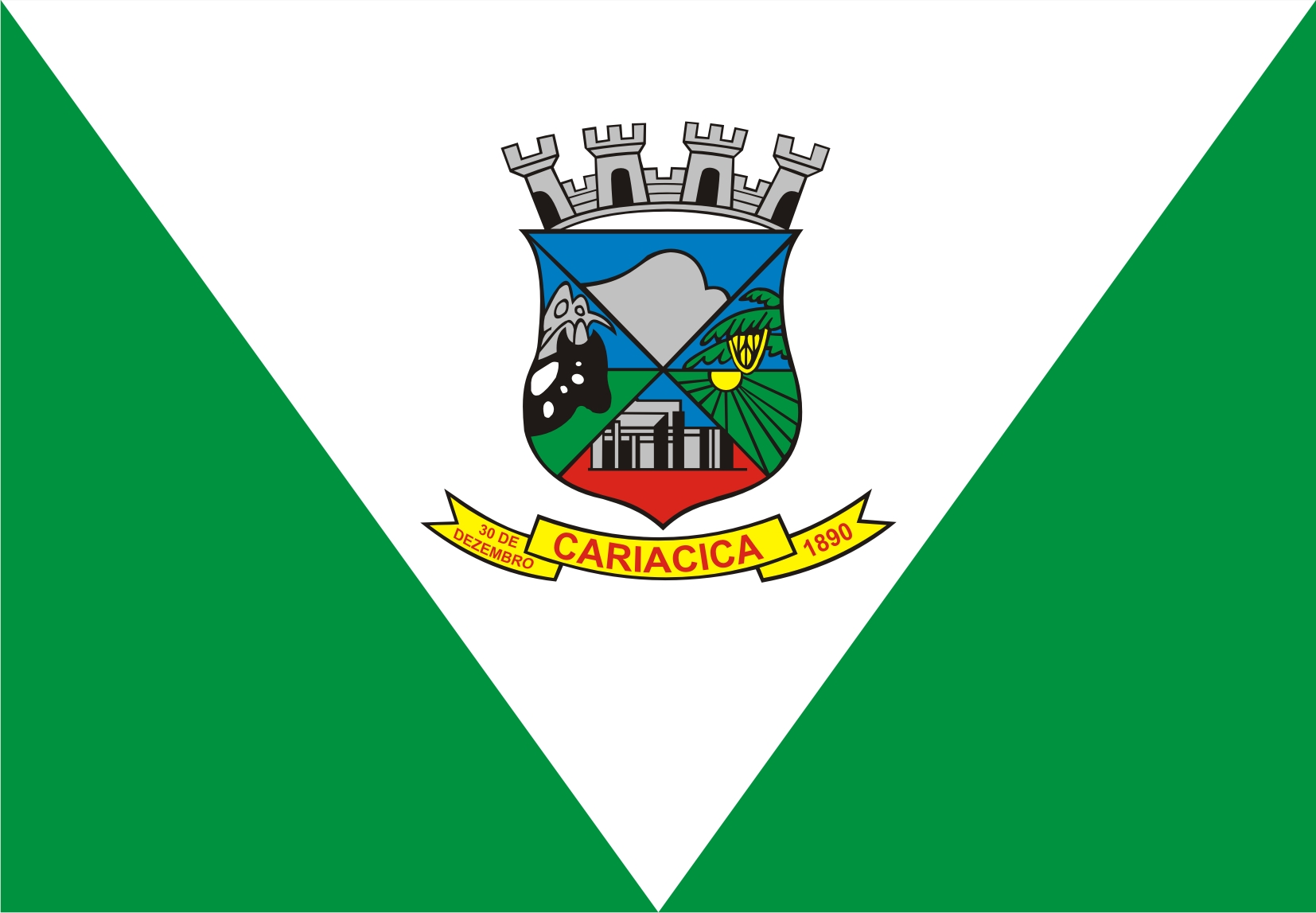
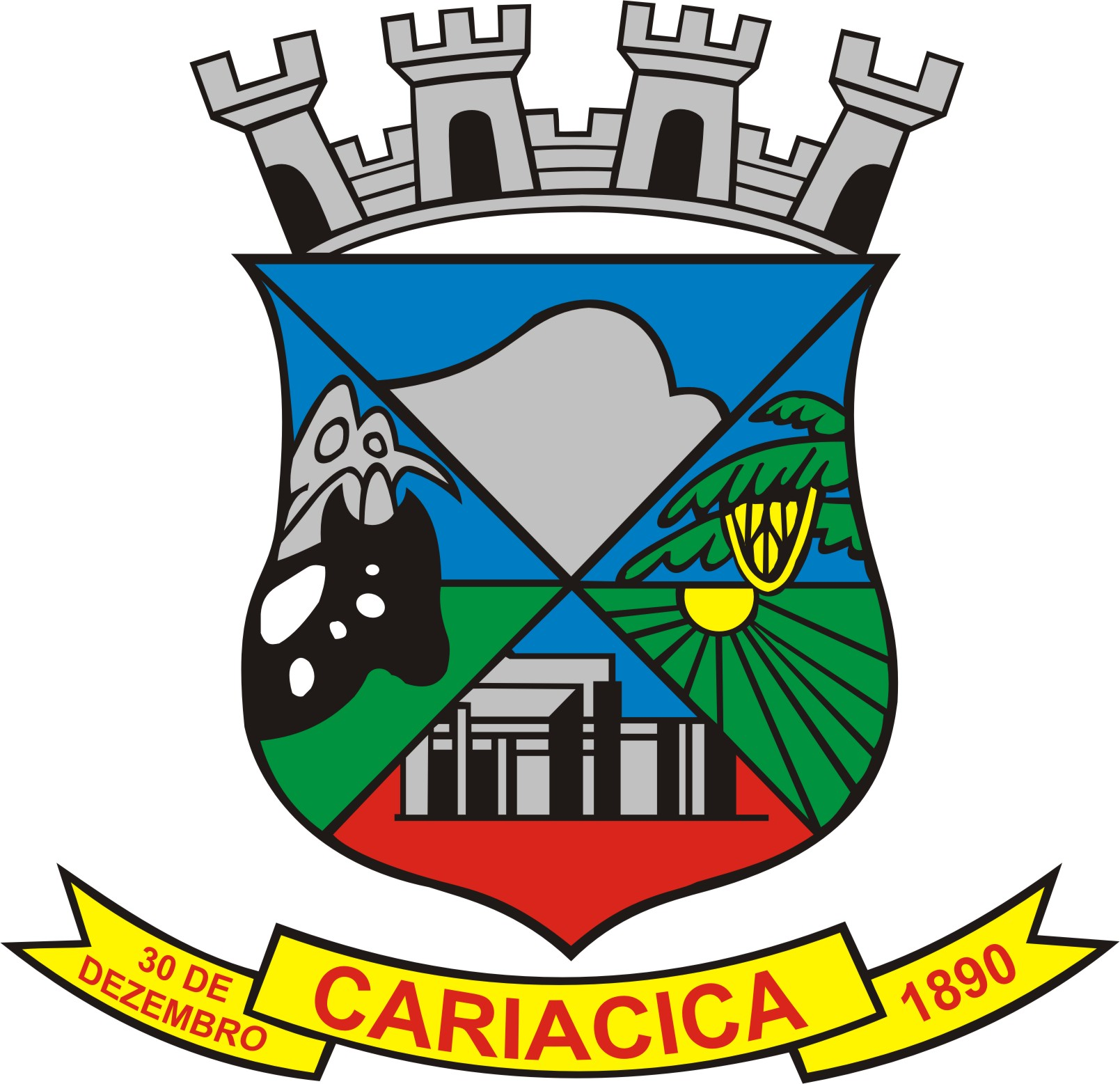
- Flag Coat of arms

- Location in the Espírito Santo

- Location in Brazil
- Coordinates: 20°15′50″S 40°25′12″W
- Country: Brazil
- Region: Southeast
- State: Espírito Santo

Area
  - Total: 279.975 km^{2} (108.099 sq mi)

Population (2022)
  - Total: 353,491
  - Estimate (2025): 376,200
  - Density: 1,262.58/km^{2} (3,270.07/sq mi)
- Time zone: UTC−3 (BRT)

Cariacica is a municipality in the state of Espírito Santo, Brazil, part of the Greater Vitória metropolitan area.

Its privileged location makes Cariacica an important center between the coast and the mountainous region of Espírito Santo, being crossed by highways BR-262 and BR-101, and by important railways such as the Vitória a Minas Railway and the Leopoldina Railway.

== Geography ==
Cariacica is located 10 km northwest of Vitória, the capital of the state. It has a population of 383,917 (2020) and forms part of the Greater Vitória metropolitan area.

The municipality contains the 2,910-hectare (7,200-acre) Duas Bocas Biological Reserve, created in 1991 to protect part of the water supply.

== History ==
Before the arrival of the colonists to this area, Tupiniquim Indians made this area their home. The name "Cariacica" comes from their language, meaning "the arrival of white men". Cariacica was created as a district of Vitória on 18 December 1837. Its full name as it was given by the Catholic Church is "Freguesia de São João Batista de Cariacica", after Saint John the Baptist, the patron saint of the town. On 30 December 1890 Cariacica separated fully from the municipality of Vitória, becoming the capital of its own municipality. Since 24 July 1971 Saint John the Baptist's day has been the city's commemorative day.

== Colonization ==
After the initial settlement instigated as a point of contact between the capital Vitória and the interior, between 1829 and 1833 some Pomeranian families arrived to the area. Population increased much more significantly after 1865, because of the formation of German colonies which headed to Santa Leopoldina and Santa Isabel. In 1837 a group of Portuguese also arrived to establish themselves in the rural district of the municipality.

== Sports ==
Cariacica has two football stadiums: the Estádio Kleber Andrade, run by the State Government; and the Estádio Engenheiro Araripe, belonging to the football club Desportiva Ferroviária.
