= 2023 Campeonato Tocantinense =

Campeonato Tocantinense
- Season: 2023
- Champions: Tocantinópolis
- Relegated: Interporto; Palmas (withdrew)
- Série D: Tocantinópolis; Capital
- Copa do Brasil: Tocantinópolis; Capital
- Copa Verde: Tocantinópolis; Capital
- Matches played: 27
- Goals scored: 58 (2.15 per match)
- Biggest home win: Tocantinópolis 6–0 Tocantins de Miracema (12 February 2023)
- Biggest away win: Tocantins de Miracema 0–4 Tocantinópolis (20 March 2023)
- Highest scoring: Tocantinópolis 6–0 Tocantins de Miracema (12 February 2023)

The 2023 Campeonato Tocantinense was the 31st edition of Tocantins' top professional football league. The competition started on 28 January and ended on 9 April. Tocantinópolis won the championship for the 6th time.

== Participating teams ==
| Club | Home City | 2022 Result |
|---|---|---|
| Bela Vista Futebol Cachoeirense | Cachoeirinha | 5th |
| Capital Futebol Clube | Palmas | 3rd |
| Gurupi Esporte Clube | Gurupi | 1st (2nd Division) |
| Interporto Futebol Clube | Porto Nacional | 2nd |
| Tocantinópolis Esporte Clube | Tocantinópolis | 1st |
| Tocantins Esporte Clube (Tocantins de Miracema) | Miracema do Tocantins | 2nd (2nd Division) |
| União Atlético Clube | Carmolândia | 4th |

Note

- Palmas withdrew from the tournament and was relegated.

== Group stage ==
| Pos | Team | Pld | W | D | L | GF | GA | GD | Pts | Qualification or relegation |
|---|---|---|---|---|---|---|---|---|---|---|
| 1 | Tocantinópolis (A) | 7 | 4 | 3 | 0 | 14 | 1 | +13 | 15 | Advance to the Final stage |
| 2 | Bela Vista (A) | 7 | 3 | 3 | 1 | 9 | 4 | +5 | 12 | Advance to the Final stage |
| 3 | Capital (A) | 7 | 2 | 4 | 1 | 9 | 5 | +4 | 10 | Advance to the Final stage |
| 4 | Tocantins de Miracema (A) | 7 | 4 | 0 | 3 | 7 | 10 | −3 | 12 | Advance to the Final stage |
| 5 | Gurupi | 7 | 2 | 3 | 2 | 6 | 6 | 0 | 9 | |
| 6 | União | 7 | 2 | 4 | 1 | 6 | 3 | +3 | 6 (Note: União lost four points, because they added an irregular player to the bench in the match against Capital.) | |
| 7 | Interporto (R) | 7 | 2 | 1 | 4 | 5 | 6 | −1 | 4 (Note: Interporto lost three points because they took the field against Tocantinópolis without any athlete registered in CBF's BID.) | 2023 Tocantinense 2nd Division |
| 8 | Palmas (R) | 7 | 0 | 0 | 7 | 0 | 21 | −21 | 0 (Note: Palmas dropped out of the championship and lost all of its games 3-0.) | 2023 Tocantinense 2nd Division |

Source: Globo Esporte
(A) Advance to a further round; (R) Relegated

== Final stage ==
=== Semi-finals ===
20 March 2023
16:00 UTC –3

| Tocantins de Miracema | 0–4 | Tocantinópolis |

Castanheirão, Miracema do Tocantins
26 March 2023
15:30 UTC –3

| Tocantinópolis | 0–0 | Tocantins de Miracema |

Ribeirão, Tocantinópolis

Tocantinópolis won 8–1 on aggregate and advanced to the finals.

18 March 2023
16:00 UTC –3

| Capital | 1–1 | Bela Vista |

Estádio Nilton Santos, Palmas
25 March 2023
15:30 UTC –3

| Bela Vista | 1–1 | Capital |
Penalties
| | 2–3 |

Estádio Jorge Filho, Angico

Tied 2–2 on aggregate, Capital won on penalties.

=== Finals ===
2 April 2023
16:00 UTC –3

| Capital | 1–2 | Tocantinópolis |

Estádio Nilton Santos, Palmas
Attendance: 675
Referee: Alisson Sidnei Furtado
9 April 2023
15:30 UTC –3

| Tocantinópolis | 4–3 | Capital |

Ribeirão, Tocantinópolis
Attendance: 2,526
Referee: Marcos Mateus

Tocantinópolis won 6–4 on aggregate.
