= 2021 Campeonato Tocantinense =

Campeonato Tocantinense
- Season: 2021
- Dates: 20 February – 30 December
- Champions: Tocantinópolis (4th title)
- 2022 Série D: Tocantinópolis
- 2022 Copa Verde: Tocantinópolis
- 2022 Copa do Brasil: Tocantinópolis
- Matches played: 33
- Goals scored: 99 (3 per match)

The 2021 Campeonato Tocantinense de Futebol was the 29rd edition of the Tocantins's top professional football league. The competition began on 20 February and was suspended in April due to the COVID-19 pandemic. In October, the Federação Tocantinense de Futebol (FTF) confirmed the return of the tournament on 12 December. The tournament ended on 30 December. Palmas were the defending champions but were eliminated in the semi-finals.

Initially, the two teams with the lowest number of points in the first stage would be relegated to the Segunda Divisão. However, FTF cancelled the relegations due to the suspension of the Campeonato caused by pandemic.

In the finals, Tocantinópolis defeated Araguacema 2–0 on aggregate to win their fourth title.

== Participating Clubs ==
- Araguacema (Araguacema)
- Capital (Palmas)
- Gurupi (Gurupi)
- Interporto (Porto Nacional)
- NC/Paraíso (Paraíso do Tocantins)
- Palmas (Palmas)
- Tocantinópolis (Tocantinópolis)
- Tocantins (Miracema do Tocantins)

== First stage ==
The match Tocantins v Gurupi was cancelled.

Pos	Team	Pld	W	D	L	GF	GA	GD	Pts	Qualification
1	Interporto	7	6	0	1	16	5	+11	18	Advance to the Final stage
2	Tocantinópolis	7	4	1	2	15	5	+10	13	Advance to the Final stage
3	Palmas	7	4	1	2	18	10	+8	13	Advance to the Final stage
4	Araguacema	7	4	1	2	14	13	+1	13	Advance to the Final stage
5	NC/Paraíso	7	2	3	2	10	10	0	9	
6	Tocantins	6	1	2	3	8	13	−5	5	
7	Capital	7	0	3	4	3	10	−7	3	
8	Gurupi	6	0	1	5	4	22	−18	1	

Source: FTFge

== Final stage ==
Semi-finals
Araguacema (p)	1	0	1 (10)
Interporto	1	0	1 (9)
Palmas	1	1	2
Tocantinópolis	2	3	5

Finals
Araguacema	0	0	0
Tocantinópolis	1	1	2
