= 2015 Campeonato Tocantinense =

Campeonato Tocantinense
- Season: 2015
- Champions: Tocantinópolis
- Relegated: Tocantins; Guaraí
- Série D: Tocantinópolis
- Copa Verde: Interporto
- Copa do Brasil: Tocantinópolis; Interporto
- Matches played: 62
- Goals scored: 172 (2.77 per match)
- Biggest home win: Paraíso 5–1 Guaraí (11 April 2015)
- Biggest away win: Tocantins 1–4 Araguaína (7 April 2015)
- Highest scoring: Interporto 5–3 Tocantins (18 April 2015)

The 2015 Campeonato Tocantinense de Futebol was the 23rd edition of the Tocantins's top professional football league. The competition began on 7 March and ended on 7 June. Tocantinópolis won the championship for the 3rd time.

== First stage ==
Pos	Team	Pld	W	D	L	GF	GA	GD	Pts	Qualification or relegation
1	Tocantinópolis	14	7	5	2	19	12	+7	26	Qualifies to the Final stage
2	Interporto	14	6	5	3	25	23	+2	23	Qualifies to the Final stage
3	Palmas	14	7	1	6	23	17	+6	22	Qualifies to the Final stage
4	Gurupi	14	6	3	5	19	15	+4	21	Qualifies to the Final stage
5	Paraíso	14	5	5	4	19	16	+3	20	
6	Araguaína	14	5	3	6	18	21	−3	18	
7	Tocantins	14	4	2	8	23	33	−10	14	Relegated
8	Guaraí	14	3	2	9	20	29	−9	11	Relegated

== Final stage ==
Semifinals
1	Tocantinópolis	0	2	2
4	Gurupi	1	1	2
2	Interporto	1	0	1
3	Palmas	0	1	1

Finals
Tocantinópolis	0	0	0
Interporto	0	0	0

== Finals ==
30 May 2015
16:00 UTC-3

Interporto	0–0	Tocantinópolis
	Report

Estádio General Sampaio, Porto Nacional
Attendance: 1,168
Referee: Tiago Costa
7 June 2015
16:00 UTC-3

Tocantinópolis	0–0	Interporto
	Report

Ribeirão, Tocantinópolis
Attendance: 4,714
Referee: Jânio Pires

Tocantinópolis won for having the best record in the league.
