= Tozin =

Brazilian footballer (born 1984)

Personal information
- Full name: Welliton de Moraes Coimbra
- Date of birth: 10 November 1984 (age 42)
- Place of birth: Gurupi, Brazil
- Height: 1.79 m (5 ft 10 in)
- Position: Forward

Team information
- Current team: Interporto

Senior career*
Years	Team	Apps	(Gls)
2004–2007	Gurupi		
2005	→ Tocantinópolis (loan)		
2006	→ América (SP) (loan)		
2007	→ Guarani (loan)	0	(0)
2007–2008	Legião	0	(0)
2008–2016	Corinthians Alagoano	0	(0)
2008	→ CRB (loan)	11	(1)
2009	→ Sagan Tosu (loan)	39	(11)
2010	→ Guaratinguetá (loan)	13	(2)
2010	→ Metropolitano (loan)	2	(0)
2011	→ Nanchang Hengyuan (loan)	0	(0)
2011	→ Cuiabá (loan)	10	(3)
2012	→ Sagan Tosu (loan)	23	(3)
2013	→ Luverdense (loan)	13	(8)
2014	→ CRB (loan)	2	(0)
2014	→ Metropolitano (loan)	10	(4)
2015	→ Aparecidense (loan)	0	(0)
2015	→ Luverdense (loan)	22	(13)
2016	Najran	13	(5)
2016	Luverdense	21	(3)
2017	Aparecidense	8	(4)
2017	Parauapebas	0	(0)
2018	Treze	0	(0)
2018	Gurupi	0	(0)
2018	CRAC	0	(0)
2018	Olímpia	0	(0)
2018	Guaraí	0	(0)
2019	Palmas	6	(1)
2019	Luverdense	8	(2)
2019	Capital FC-TO	0	(0)
2020–	Interporto	0	(0)
- * Club domestic league appearances and goals as of 13:41, 23 January 2020 (UTC)

Welliton de Moraes Coimbra, known as Tozin or Tozim (born 10 November 1984), is a Brazilian professional footballer who plays for Interporto. He has played abroad in China, Japan and Saudi Arabia.

== Career ==
Tozin spent his early career on loan from Gurupi to various clubs competing in Brazilian state football. In July 2007 he signed a 1-year deal with Legião. The team finished as the runner-up of Campeonato Brasiliense Second Division. In May 2008 he was signed by Corinthians Alagoano on a three-year contract and left for fellow Alagoas club CRB on loan. His loan was ended early on 29 October, a few weeks before the end of 2008 Campeonato Brasileiro Série B.

In February 2009 he moved on loan to J2 League club Sagan Tosu. Tozin returned to Maceió in January 2010. Corinthians Alagoano finished as the losing semi-finalists of 2010 Campeonato Alagoano. In May he left on loan again to Guaratinguetá and made a few appearances in 2010 Campeonato Brasileiro Série B. In September he had a further loan spell with Metropolitano in 2010 Campeonato Brasileiro Série D.

Tozin's contract with Corinthians Alagoano was extended to in January 2011 for a further two years, and he moved to Chinese Super League side Nanchang Hengyuan on a one-year loan deal. However, he returned to Corinthians Alagoano in March without playing a match in China. He was immediately loaned again to Cuiabá.

In January 2012, Tozin joined J1 League side Sagan Tosu on a one-year loan deal.

Tozin was loaned to Luverdense for 2013, but was released for disciplinary reasons by the club in October, despite being top scorer in 2013 Campeonato Brasileiro Série C at the time. Later in the year it was announced that he would join CRB on loan for the 2014 season. After two appearances in 2014 Campeonato Brasileiro Série C he moved to Metropolitano for a second loan spell, competing in Série D.

Tozin spent 2015 on loan with Aparecidense and Luverdense, where he scored 13 goals in 2015 Campeonato Brasileiro Série B. He was announced as a signing for Aparecidense for the 2016 season, but instead moved to Saudi Arabia, joining Najran SC. He returned to Brazil, for a third spellwith Luverdense, in June 2016.

Tozin joined Aparecidense again in 2017, featuring firstly in the Campeonato Goiano, where he notably scored a volley from a corner kick in the first game of the competition, a feat he was invited by Globo Esporte to reproduce in front of the cameras. He went on to feature in all eight of the clubs 2017 Campeonato Brasileiro Série D matches. At the end of the campaign he joined Parauapebas for the remainder of the Campeonato Paraense Second Division season, but was released before the final took place.

Tozin signed for Treze for the 2018 Campeonato Paraibano season. He left midway through the championship, joining Gurupi to play in the Campeonato Tocantinense where he was top scorer with 13 goals. At the end of that competition he signed for CRAC in the second division of Campeonato Goiano, where he made just two appearances. By late September he had moved on again, to Sport Club Guaraí who were engaged in the second division of the Campeonato Tocantinense.

Tozin started 2019 with Palmas for the 2019 Campeonato Tocantinense and 2019 Campeonato Brasileiro Série D. in June, with Palmas knocked out of Série D he signed for a fourth spell with Luverdense, playing in 2018 Campeonato Brasileiro Série C. In November he joined Capital Futebol Clube in the second division of Campeonato Tocantinense, where he helped the team to win the title.

On 20 January 2020, Tozin signed for Interporto Futebol Clube for the 2020 Campeonato Tocantinense.

== Career statistics ==
Appearances and goals by club, season and competition
Club	Season	League			State League		Cup		Other		Total	
Club	Season	Division	Apps	Goals	Apps	Goals	Apps	Goals	Apps	Goals	Apps	Goals
Corinthians Alagoano	2008	Alagoano	—			6 (Note: Corinthians Alagoano state league goals: 2008 2009 2010)	—		—			6
Corinthians Alagoano	2009	Alagoano	—			5	—		—			5
Corinthians Alagoano	2010	Alagoano	—			10	2	1	—			11
CRB (loan)	2008	Série B	11	1	—		—		—		11	1
Sagan Tosu (loan)	2009	J2 League	39	11	—		3	1	—		42	12
Guaratinguetá (loan)	2010	Série B	10	2	—		—		—		10	2
Metropolitano (loan)	2010	Série D	2	0	—		—		—		2	0
Cuiabá (loan)	2011	Série D	10	3	—		—		—		10	3
Sagan Tosu (loan)	2012	J1 League	23	3	—		—		5 (Note: Appearances in 2012 J.League Cup.)	0	28	3
Luverdense (loan)	2013	Série C	13	0	—		8	3	—		21	3
CRB (loan)	2014	Série C	2	0	13	5	7	1	—		22	6
Metropolitano (loan)	2014	Série D	10	4	—		—		—		10	4
Aparecidense (loan)	2015	Goiano	—		16	8	—		—		16	8
Luverdense (loan)	2015	Série B	22	13	—		—		—		22	13
Najran SC	2015–16	Professional League	13	5	—		—		—		13	5
Luverdense	2016	Série B	21	3	—		—		—		21	3
Aparecidense	2017	Série D	8	4	12	3	—		—		20	7
Parauapebas	2017	Paraense Second Level	—		3 (Note: Parauapebas appearances:)	0	—		—		3	0
Treze	2018	Paraibano	—		5	0	0	0	1 (Note: Appearances in 2018 Copa do Nordeste.)	0	6	0
Gurupi	2018	Tocantinense	—		15 (Note: Appearances for Gurupi in 2018 Tocantinense:)	13	—		—		15	13
CRAC	2018	Goiano Second Level	—		2 (Note: Appearances for CRAC:)	0	—		—		2	0
Guaraí	2018	Tocantinense Second Level	—		8 (Note: Appearances for Guaraí:)	3	—		—		8	3
Palmas	2019	Tocantinense	—		11 (Note: Appearances for Palmas in 2019 Tocantinense:)	6	1	0	—		6	
Luverdense	2019	Série C	8	2	—		—		3 (Note: Appearances in 2019 Copa Verde.)	2	11	4
Capital FC-TO	2019	Tocantinense Second Level	—		6 (Note: Appearances for Capital FC in 2019 Tocantinense Second Level:)	4	—		—		6	4
Career total			192	51	91+	63	21	6	8	2	312+	122
