= 2013 Campeonato Tocantinense =

Campeonato Tocantinense de Futebol
- Season: 2013
- Champions: Interporto
- Relegated: Tocantins; Guaraí
- Copa do Brasil: Interporto
- Matches: 62
- Goals: 160 (2.58 per match)
- Top goalscorer: Fábio Bala (Interporto) - 11 goals

The 2013 Campeonato Tocantinense was the 21st edition of the Tocantins' top professional football league. The competition began on March 2, and ended on June 8. Interporto won the championship by the 2nd time, while Tocantins and Guaraí were relegated.

== Format ==
On the first stage, there are two rounds. Each round is a round-robin. The two best teams in each round advances to the round's final, so the winner of the round can be determined.

On the final stage, each round winner plays in the final. If the same team wins both round, that team is the champion.

=== Qualifications ===
The champion qualifies to the 2014 Copa do Brasil.

== Participating teams ==
Club	Home city	2012 result
Araguaína	Araguaína	1st (2nd division)
Colinas	Colinas do Tocantins	3rd
Guaraí	Guaraí	5th
Gurupi	Gurupi	1st
Interporto	Porto Nacional	4th
Palmas	Palmas	2nd (2nd division)
Tocantins	Palmas	6th
Tocantinópolis	Tocantinópolis	2nd

== First round ==
=== Standings ===
Pos	Team	Pld	W	D	L	GF	GA	GD	Pts	Qualification
1	Interporto	7	5	1	1	9	5	+4	16	Advanced to the Final stage
2	Gurupi	7	3	1	3	9	5	+4	10	Advanced to the Final stage
3	Colinas	7	3	1	3	8	10	−2	10	Advanced to the Final stage
4	Palmas-TO	7	2	4	1	7	6	+1	10	Advanced to the Final stage
5	Tocantinópolis	7	2	2	3	9	8	+1	8	
6	Tocantins	7	2	2	3	9	12	−3	8	
7	Guaraí	7	2	2	3	3	6	−3	8	
8	Araguaína	7	2	1	4	9	13	−4	7	

=== Results ===
Home \ Away	ARA	COL	GRÍ	GUR	IPO	PAL	TCS	TEC
Araguaína			2–0	1–0	2–3			0–2
Colinas	3–1				0–2	2–2		1–0
Guaraí		2–1				0–0	0–2	
Gurupi		3–0	0–0				4–1	0–2
Interporto			1–0	0–2				2–1
Palmas-TO	2–2			1–0	0–1			
Tocantins	3–1	0–1			0–0	0–1		
Tocantinópolis			0–1			1–1	3–3	

Legend: Blue = home team win; Yellow = draw; Red = away team win.

=== Finals ===
April 13, 2013
16:00 UTC−03:00

Gurupi	1–3	Interporto
Fernando 12'		Éverson 33'; Fábio Bala 63'; Isac 68'

Estádio Gilberto Resende Rocha, Gurupi
Referee: Jânio Pires Gonçalves

April 21, 2013
16:00 UTC−03:00

Interporto	2–2	Gurupi
Marcos Paulo 30'; Igor 65'		Ricardo Urubu 16'; Fernando 18'

Estádio General Sampaio, Porto Nacional
Attendance: 2000
Referee: Alisson Sidnei Furtado

== Second round ==
=== Standings ===
Pos	Team	Pld	W	D	L	GF	GA	GD	Pts	Qualification
1	Palmas-TO	7	4	3	0	11	5	+6	15	Advanced to the Final stage
2	Gurupi	7	4	1	2	15	6	+9	13	Advanced to the Final stage
3	Interporto	7	4	1	2	18	13	+5	13	Advanced to the Final stage
4	Tocantinópolis	7	3	1	3	9	10	−1	10	Advanced to the Final stage
5	Guaraí	7	2	2	3	5	8	−3	8	
6	Araguaína	7	2	2	3	10	16	−6	8	
7	Colinas	7	1	2	4	5	9	−4	5	
8	Tocantins	7	1	2	4	6	12	−6	5	

Rules for classification: 1) points; 2) goal difference; 3) number of goals scored.

=== Results ===
Home \ Away	ARA	COL	GRÍ	GUR	IPO	PAL	TCS	TEC
Araguaína		2–1				1–1	3–1	
Colinas			0–1	1–0			2–2	
Guaraí	0–0			0–2	1–0			1–1
Gurupi	4–1				6–3	0–1		
Interporto	6–2	2–0				3–3	2–0	
Palmas-TO		0–0	2–1				2–0	2–0
Tocantins			3–1	0–0				0–2
Tocantinópolis	3–1	2–1		0–3	1–2			

Legend: Blue = home team win; Yellow = draw; Red = away team win.

=== Finals ===
May 25, 2013
16:00 UTC−03:00

Gurupi	1–1	Palmas
Lúcio 11'		Nona 43'

Estádio Gilberto Resende Rocha, Gurupi
Attendance: 1,579
Referee: Leandro Oliveira

May 28, 2013
16:00 UTC−03:00

Palmas	2–3	Gurupi
André Leonel 22', 60' (pen.)		Lourival 6', 88'; Lúcio 76'

Estádio Nilton Santos, Palmas, Tocantins
Attendance: 2,000
Referee: Luciano Santos

== Final stage ==
June 5, 2013
20:15 UTC−03:00

Gurupi	1–1	Interporto
Lúcio Bala 7'		Éverton 58'

Estádio Gilberto Resende Rocha, Gurupi
Referee: Jânio Pires

June 8, 2013
16:00 UTC−03:00

Interporto	1–0	Gurupi
Rodrigo 74'

Estádio General Sampaio, Porto Nacional
Referee: Alisson Furtado

Interporto is the champion of the 2013 Campeonato Tocantinense.

== Final standings ==
Pos	Team	Pld	W	D	L	GF	GA	GD	Pts	Qualification or relegation
1	Interporto	18	11	4	3	34	22	+12	37	Advanced to the Final stage
2	Gurupi	20	8	5	7	32	21	+11	29	Advanced to the Final stage
3	Palmas-TO	16	6	8	2	21	15	+6	26	Advanced to the Final stage
4	Tocantinópolis	14	5	3	6	18	18	0	18	Advanced to the Final stage
5	Guaraí	14	4	4	6	8	14	−6	16	
6	Colinas	14	4	3	7	13	19	−6	15	
7	Araguaína (R)	14	4	3	7	19	29	−10	15	Relegated
8	Tocantins (R)	14	3	4	7	15	22	−7	13	Relegated

Rules for classification: 1) points; 2) goal difference; 3) number of goals scored.
(R) Relegated
