= 2024 Campeonato Tocantinense =

Campeonato Tocantinense
- Season: 2024
- Dates: 27 January - 6 April
- Champions: União
- Relegated: Batalhão; Bela Vista
- Série D: Tocantinópolis; União
- Copa do Brasil: Tocantinópolis; União
- Copa Verde: Tocantinópolis; União
- Matches played: 34
- Goals scored: 77 (2.26 per match)
- Top goalscorer: Bruno Morais (4 goals)

The 2024 Campeonato Tocantinense was the 32nd edition of Tocantins' top professional football league. The competition started on 27 January and ended on 6 April. União won the championship for the 2nd time.

== Rules ==
In the first phase, eight teams face each other in first games. The four teams with the highest number of points advance to the second phase (semifinals). In the semifinals, the teams face each other in round-trip games. In the final there will also be round-trip games. The two worst teams in the 1st phase will be relegated to the Second Division.

According to the regulations, at the end of the first phase, for teams that finish tied on points, the following tiebreaker criteria will be: highest number of wins, best goal difference, highest number of pro goals, direct confrontation (between teams) and draw at FTF headquarters.

In the following phases to know the winning team in case of a tie on points, after the round-trip games, they will be as follows:

Best goal difference – within the dispute phase. If the tie still persists, the decision will be on penalties.

== First stage ==
Pos	Team	Pld	W	D	L	GF	GA	GD	Pts	Qualification or relegation
1	União (A)	7	6	1	0	10	1	+9	19	Advance to the Final stages
2	Tocantinópolis (A)	7	4	2	1	8	3	+5	14	Advance to the Final stages
3	Capital (A)	7	4	1	2	10	6	+4	13	Advance to the Final stages
4	Araguaína (A)	7	4	1	2	9	5	+4	13	Advance to the Final stages
5	Gurupi	7	2	3	2	6	6	0	9	
6	Tocantins	7	2	1	4	6	13	−7	7	
7	Bela Vista (R)	7	1	1	5	7	11	−4	4	
8	Batalhão (R)	7	0	0	7	5	16	−11	0	

Source: Globo Esporte
(A) Advance to a further round; (R) Relegated

== Final stages ==
=== Semi-finals ===
Date	Winner	Score	Eliminated	Aggregate
03/16/24 03/23/24	União	1 – 1 1 – 1 (5-4 p)	Araguaína	2-2
03/19/24 03/24/24	Tocantinópolis	3–2 1–0	Capital	4-2

=== Finals ===
Date	Winner	Score	Eliminated	Aggregate
03/30/24 04/06/24	União	2 – 1 2 – 1	Tocantinópolis	4-2
