= Roberto Oliveira (footballer, born 1953) =

Brazilian football manager and former player

Personal information
- Full name: Oswaldo Roberto Oliveira
- Date of birth: 1 January 1953 (age 73)
- Place of birth: São Carlos, Brazil

Senior career*
Years	Team	Apps	(Gls)
1971	Noroeste		
1972–1975	São Bento		
1976	Marília		
1976–1977	Barretos		
1977–1985	Vila Nova		

Managerial career
- 1986: Vila Nova
- 1987–1988: Atlético Goianiense
- 1989: Vila Nova
- 1989: Náutico
- 1990: Goiás
- 1990: Vila Nova
- 1991: Barretos
- 1992: Mineiros
- 1993: Anapolina
- 1994: Goiatuba
- 1995: Itumbiara
- 1998: Lemense
- 1999: Fortaleza
- 2005: Vila Nova
- 2006: Aparecidense
- 2006: Araguaína
- 2007: Palmas
- 2009: Goiânia
- 2010–2011: Gurupi
- 2011: Araguaína
- 2011: Barra do Garças
- 2012: Vila Nova
- 2013: Interporto
- 2013–2014: São Carlos
- 2014: Interporto
- 2016–2017: Gurupi
- * Club domestic league appearances and goals

Oswaldo Roberto Oliveira, usually known as Roberto Oliveira (born 1 January 1953) is a Brazilian football manager and a former player.

Roberto is where he has worked as a player and as a manager. Played soccer in the Noroeste, São Bento, Barretos and Vila Nova where was six times Campeonato Goiano. As a player, he was six times Campeonato Goiano by Vila Nova. Even in the State of Goias, already as a technician, won the State with the Atlético Goianiense and the Vila Nova. In Tocantins, the commander led the Campeonato Tocantinense in 2006, 2007, 2010 and 2011.

== Honours ==
=== Player ===
Vila Nova

- Campeonato Goiano: 1977, 1978, 1979, 1980, 1982 e 1984.

=== Manager ===
Atlético Goianiense

- Campeonato Goiano: 1988

Vila Nova

- Campeonato Goiano: 2000

Araguaína

- Campeonato Tocantinense: 2006

Palmas

- Campeonato Tocantinense: 2007

Gurupi

- Campeonato Tocantinense: 2010, 2011
