= 2011 in Brazilian football =

Football in Brazil
- Season: 2011

The following article presents a summary of the 2011 football (soccer) season in Brazil, which was the 110th season of competitive football in the country.

== Campeonato Brasileiro Série A ==
The 2011 Campeonato Brasileiro Série A started on 21 May 2011, and concluded on 4 December 2011.

Pos	Team	Pld	W	D	L	GF	GA	GD	Pts	Qualification or relegation
1	Corinthians (C)	38	21	8	9	53	36	+17	71	2012 Copa Libertadores Second Stage
2	Vasco da Gama	38	19	12	7	57	40	+17	69	2012 Copa Libertadores Second Stage (Note: Vasco da Gama is qualified for the second stage of the 2012 Copa Libertadores as the 2011 Copa do Brasil champion.)
3	Fluminense	38	20	3	15	60	51	+9	63	2012 Copa Libertadores Second Stage
4	Flamengo	38	15	16	7	59	47	+12	61	2012 Copa Libertadores First Stage
5	Internacional	38	16	12	10	57	43	+14	60	2012 Copa Libertadores First Stage
6	São Paulo	38	16	11	11	57	46	+11	59	2012 Copa Sudamericana Second Stage
7	Figueirense	38	15	13	10	46	45	+1	58	2012 Copa Sudamericana Second Stage
8	Coritiba	38	16	9	13	57	41	+16	57	2012 Copa Sudamericana Second Stage
9	Botafogo	38	16	8	14	52	49	+3	56	2012 Copa Sudamericana Second Stage
10	Santos	38	15	8	15	55	55	0	53	2012 Copa Libertadores Second Stage (Note: Santos is qualified for the second stage of the 2012 Copa Libertadores as the 2011 Copa Libertadores champion.)
11	Palmeiras	38	11	17	10	43	39	+4	50	2012 Copa Sudamericana Second Stage
12	Grêmio	38	13	9	16	49	57	−8	48	2012 Copa Sudamericana Second Stage
13	Atlético Goianiense	38	12	12	14	50	45	+5	48	2012 Copa Sudamericana Second Stage
14	Bahia	38	11	13	14	43	49	−6	46	2012 Copa Sudamericana Second Stage
15	Atlético Mineiro	38	13	6	19	50	60	−10	45	
16	Cruzeiro	38	11	10	17	48	51	−3	43	
17	Atlético Paranaense	38	10	11	17	38	55	−17	41	Relegation to Série B
18	Ceará	38	10	9	19	47	64	−17	39	Relegation to Série B
19	América Mineiro	38	8	13	17	51	69	−18	37	Relegation to Série B
20	Avaí	38	7	10	21	45	75	−30	31	Relegation to Série B

Rules for classification: 1st points; 2nd wins; 3rd goal difference; 4th goals scored; 5th head-to-head results; 6th least red cards received; 7th least yellow cards received; 8th draw
(C) Champions
Notes:

Corinthians declared as the Campeonato Brasileiro Série A champions.

=== Relegation ===
The four worst placed teams, which are Atlético Paranaense, Ceará, América (MG) and Avaí, were relegated to the following year's second level.

== Campeonato Brasileiro Série B ==
The 2011 Campeonato Brasileiro Série B started on 6 May 2011, and concluded on 26 November 2011.

Pos	Team	Pld	W	D	L	GF	GA	GD	Pts	Promotion or relegation
1	Portuguesa (C, P)	38	23	12	3	82	38	+44	81	Promotion to Série A
2	Náutico (P)	38	17	13	8	51	41	+10	64	Promotion to Série A
3	Ponte Preta (P)	38	17	12	9	63	45	+18	63	Promotion to Série A
4	Sport Recife (P)	38	17	10	11	62	44	+18	61	Promotion to Série A
5	Vitória	38	17	9	12	61	48	+13	60	
6	Bragantino	38	16	10	12	65	53	+12	58	
7	Boa Esporte	38	16	9	13	44	40	+4	57	
8	Americana	38	15	11	12	40	45	−5	56	
9	Barueri	38	15	8	15	48	53	−5	53	
10	ABC	38	13	14	11	52	53	−1	53	
11	Goiás	38	16	4	18	51	57	−6	52	
12	Guarani	38	15	7	16	51	48	+3	52	
13	Paraná	38	14	10	14	48	44	+4	52	
14	Criciúma	38	13	12	13	43	43	0	51	
15	São Caetano	38	12	15	11	57	51	+6	51	
16	ASA	38	13	9	16	44	54	−10	48	
17	Icasa (R)	38	11	14	13	52	55	−3	47	Relegation to Série C
18	Vila Nova (R)	38	7	11	20	34	53	−19	32	Relegation to Série C
19	Salgueiro (R)	38	8	5	25	32	63	−31	26 (Note: Salgueiro was docked 3 points due to fielding a suspended player.)	Relegation to Série C
20	Duque de Caxias (R)	38	2	11	25	32	84	−52	17	Relegation to Série C

Updated to match(es) played on 5 November 2011. Source: CBF
Rules for classification: 1st points; 2nd wins; 3rd goal difference; 4th goals scored; 5th head-to-head results; 6th least red cards received; 7th least yellow cards received; 8th draw.
(C) Champions; (P) Promoted; (R) Relegated
Notes:

Portuguesa declared as the Campeonato Brasileiro Série B champions.

=== Promotion ===
The four best placed teams, which are Portuguesa, Náutico, Ponte Preta and Sport, were promoted to the following year's first level.

=== Relegation ===
The four worst placed teams, which are Icasa, Vila Nova, Salgueiro and Duque de Caxias, were relegated to the following year's third level.

== Campeonato Brasileiro Série C ==
The 2011 Campeonato Brasileiro Série C started on 16 July 2011, and concluded on 3 December 2011. The Campeonato Brasileiro Série C final was played between Joinville and CRB.

26 November 2011

CRB	1–3	Joinville

Rei Pelé

3 December 2011

Joinville	4–0	CRB

Arena Joinville

Joinville declared as the league champions by aggregate score of 7–1.

=== Participating teams ===
- América (RN)
- Águia de Marabá
- Araguaína
- Brasil de Pelotas
- Brasiliense
- Campinense
- Caxias
- Chapecoense
- CRB
- Fortaleza
- Guarany de Sobral
- Ipatinga
- Joinville
- Luverdense
- Madureira
- Macaé
- Marília
- Paysandu
- Rio Branco (AC)
- Santo André

=== Promotion ===
The four best placed teams, which are Joinville, CRB, Ipatinga and América (RN), were promoted to the following year's second level.

=== Relegation ===
The four worst placed teams, which are Campinense, Marília, Brasil de Pelotas and Araguaína, were relegated to the following year's fourth level.

== Campeonato Brasileiro Série D ==
The 2011 Campeonato Brasileiro Série D started on 18 July 2011, and concluded on 20 November 2011.

=== Participating teams ===
- Alecrim
- Anapolina
- Audax Rio
- Bahia de Feira
- Brusque
- CENE
- Cerâmica
- Cianorte
- Comercial (PI)
- Coruripe
- Cruzeiro (PA)
- Cuiabá
- Formosa
- Gama
- Guarani de Juazeiro
- Independente
- Itumbiara
- Juventude
- Metropolitano
- Mirassol
- Nacional (AM)
- Oeste
- Operário (PR)
- Penarol
- Plácido de Castro
- Porto
- River Plate
- Sampaio Corrêa
- Santa Cruz
- Santa Cruz (RS)
- São Mateus
- São Raimundo (PA)
- Tocantinópolis
- Trem
- Treze
- Tupi
- Vila Aurora
- Villa Nova
- Vitória da Conquista
- Volta Redonda

The Campeonato Brasileiro Série D final was played between Tupi and Santa Cruz.

13 November 2011

Tupi	1–0	Santa Cruz

Estádio Mário Helênio

20 November 2011

Santa Cruz	0–2	Tupi

Estádio do Arruda

Tupi declared as the league champions by aggregate score of 3–0.

=== Promotion ===
The four best placed teams, which are Tupi, Santa Cruz, Cuiabá and Oeste, were promoted to the following year's third level.

== Copa do Brasil ==
The 2011 Copa do Brasil started on 16 February 2011, and concluded on 8 June 2011. The Copa do Brasil final was played between Vasco and Coritiba.

1 June 2011

Vasco	1–0	Coritiba

São Januário

8 June 2011

Coritiba	3–2	Vasco

Couto Pereira

Vasco declared as the cup champions on the away goal rule by aggregate score of 3–3.

== State championship champions ==
State	Champion
(Acre (state)) Acre	Rio Branco
Alagoas	ASA
Amapá	Trem
(Amazonas (Brazilian state)) Amazonas	Penarol
Bahia	Bahia de Feira
Ceará	Ceará
(Federal District (Brazil)) Distrito Federal	Brasiliense
Espírito Santo	São Mateus
Goiás	Atlético Goianiense
Maranhão	Sampaio Corrêa
Mato Grosso	Cuiabá
Mato Grosso do Sul	CENE
Minas Gerais	Cruzeiro
Pará	Independente
Paraíba	Treze
(Paraná (state)) Paraná	Coritiba
Pernambuco	Santa Cruz
Piauí	4 de Julho
(Rio de Janeiro (state)) Rio de Janeiro	Flamengo
Rio Grande do Norte	ABC
Rio Grande do Sul	Internacional
Rondônia	Espigão
Roraima	Real
(Santa Catarina (state)) Santa Catarina	Chapecoense
(São Paulo (state)) São Paulo	Santos
Sergipe	River Plate
Tocantins	Gurupi

== Youth competition champions ==
Competition	Champion
Campeonato Brasileiro Sub-20	América (MG)
Copa Brasil Sub-17 (Copa Nacional do Espírito Santo Sub-17) (Note: The Copa Nacional do Espírito Santo Sub-17, between 2008 and 2012, was named Copa Brasil Sub-17. The similar named Copa do Brasil Sub-17 is organized by the Brazilian Football Confederation and it was first played in 2013.)	Cruzeiro
Copa Rio Sub-17	Palmeiras
Copa Santiago de Futebol Juvenil	Internacional
Copa São Paulo de Futebol Júnior	Flamengo
Copa Sub-17 de Promissão	Internacional
Taça Belo Horizonte de Juniores	Atlético Mineiro
Copa 2 de Julho Sub-17	São Paulo

== Other competition champions ==
Competition	Champion
Campeonato Paulista do Interior	Oeste
Copa Espírito Santo	Real Noroeste
Copa FGF	Juventude
Copa Governador do Mato Grosso	Luverdense
Copa Paulista de Futebol	Paulista
Copa Pernambuco	Náutico
Copa Rio	Madureira
Copa Santa Catarina	Joinville
Taça Minas Gerais	Ipatinga

== Brazilian clubs in international competitions ==
Team	2011 Copa Libertadores	2011 Copa Sudamericana	2011 Recopa Sudamericana	2011 FIFA Club World Cup
Atlético Mineiro	N/A	Second stage eliminated by (Brazil) Botafogo	N/A	N/A
Atlético Paranaense	N/A	Second stage eliminated by (Brazil) Flamengo	N/A	N/A
Botafogo	N/A	Round of 16 eliminated by (Colombia) Santa Fe	N/A	N/A
Ceará	N/A	Second stage eliminated by (Brazil) São Paulo	N/A	N/A
Corinthians	First stage eliminated by (Colombia) Deportes Tolima	N/A	N/A	N/A
Cruzeiro	Round of 16 eliminated by (Colombia) Once Caldas	N/A	N/A	N/A
Flamengo	N/A	Round of 16 eliminated by Universidad de Chile	N/A	N/A
Fluminense	Round of 16 eliminated by (Paraguay) Libertad	N/A	N/A	N/A
Grêmio	Round of 16 eliminated by (Chile) Universidad Católica	N/A	N/A	N/A
Internacional	Round of 16 eliminated by (Uruguay) Peñarol	N/A	Champions defeated (Argentina) Independiente	N/A
Palmeiras	N/A	Second stage eliminated by (Brazil) Vasco da Gama	N/A	N/A
Santos	Champions defeated (Uruguay) Peñarol	N/A	N/A	Runners-up lost to (Spain) Barcelona
São Paulo	N/A	Round of 16 eliminated by (Paraguay) Libertad	N/A	N/A
Vasco da Gama	N/A	Semifinals eliminated by Universidad de Chile	N/A	N/A

== Brazil national team ==
The following table lists all the games played by the Brazilian national team in official competitions and friendly matches during 2011.

9 February International; Friendly	France	1–0	Brazil	Saint-Denis
	Benzema 54'	Report		Stadium: Stade de France, France; Attendance: 79,712; Referee: Wolfgang Stark (Germany)

27 March International; Friendly	Scotland	0–2	Brazil	London, England
		Report	Neymar 42', 77' (pen.)	Stadium: Emirates Stadium; Attendance: 53,087; Referee: Howard Webb (England)

4 June International; Friendly	Brazil	0–0	Netherlands	Goiânia, Brazil
				Stadium: Estádio Serra Dourada; Attendance: 36,449; Referee: Carlos Amarilla (Paraguay)

7 June International; Friendly	Brazil	1–0	Romania	São Paulo, Brazil
	Fred 21'			Stadium: Estádio do Pacaembu; Attendance: 30,059; Referee: Sergio Pezzotta (Argentina)

3 July Copa América group stage	Brazil	0–0	Venezuela	La Plata, Argentina
16:00		Report		Stadium: Estadio Ciudad de La Plata; Attendance: 35,000; Referee: Raúl Orosco (Bolivia)

9 July Copa América group stage	Brazil	2–2	Paraguay	Córdoba, Argentina
16:00	Jádson 39'; Fred 90'	Report	Santa Cruz 55'; Valdez 67'	Stadium: Estadio Mario Alberto Kempes; Attendance: 57,000; Referee: Wilmar Roldán (Colombia)

13 July Copa América group stage	Brazil	4–2	Ecuador	Córdoba, Argentina
21:45	Pato 28', 61'; Neymar 49', 72'	Report	Caicedo 37', 59'	Stadium: Estadio Mario Alberto Kempes; Attendance: 39,000; Referee: Roberto Silvera (Uruguay)

17 July Copa América; Quarterfinals	Brazil	0–0 (a.e.t.) (0–2 p)	Paraguay	La Plata, Argentina
16:00		Report		Stadium: Estadio Ciudad de La Plata; Attendance: 36,000; Referee: Sergio Pezzotta (Argentina)
	Penalties
	Elano (penalty missed); Silva (penalty missed); Santos (penalty missed); Fred (penalty missed)		Barreto (penalty missed); Estigarribia (penalty scored); Riveros (penalty scored)

10 August International; Friendly	Germany	3–2	Brazil	Stuttgart, Germany
	Schweinsteiger 61' (pen.); Götze 67'; Schürrle 80'		Robinho 71' (pen.); Neymar 90+2'	Stadium: Mercedes-Benz Arena; Attendance: 54,767; Referee: Viktor Kassai (Hungary)

5 September International; Friendly	Brazil	1–0	Ghana	Fullham, England
	Leandro Damião 45'			Stadium: Craven Cottage; Attendance: 25,700; Referee: Mike Dean (England)

14 September Superclásico de las Américas	Argentina	0–0	Brazil	Córdoba, Argentina
21:50 (UTC−03:00)		Report		Stadium: Estadio Mario Alberto Kempes; Referee: Enrique Osses (Chile)

28 September Superclásico de las Américas	Brazil	2–0	Argentina	Belém, Brazil
21:50 (UTC−03:00)	Lucas 54'; Neymar 75'	Report		Stadium: Estádio Olímpico do Pará (Mangueirão); Attendance: 45,000; Referee: Jorge Larrionda (Uruguay)

7 October International; Friendly	Costa Rica	0–1	Brazil	San José, Costa Rica
			Neymar 60'	Stadium: Estadio Nacional; Referee: Walter López (Guatemala)

11 October International; Friendly	Mexico	1–2	Brazil	Torreón, Mexico
	David Luiz 10' (o.g.)		Ronaldinho 79'; Marcelo 83'	Stadium: Estadio Corona; Attendance: 30,000; Referee: Marlon Mejía (El Salvador)

10 November International; Friendly	Gabon	0–2	Brazil	Libreville, Gabon
			Sandro 12'; Hernanes 35'	Stadium: Stade d'Angondjé; Referee: Victor Hlungwani (South Africa)

14 November International; Friendly	Egypt	0–2	Brazil	Doha, Qatar
			Jonas 39', 59'	Stadium: Khalifa International Stadium; Attendance: 18,000; Referee: Banjar Al Dosari (Qatar)

== Women's football ==
=== National team ===
The following table lists all the games played by the Brazil women's national football team in official competitions and friendly matches during 2011.

29 June 2011 World Cup group stage	Brazil	1–0	Australia	Mönchengladbach, Germany
18:15	Rosana 54'	Report		Stadium: Borussia-Park; Attendance: 27,258; Referee: Jenny Palmqvist (Sweden)

3 July 2011 World Cup group stage	Brazil	3–0	Norway	Wolfsburg, Germany
18:15	Marta 22', 48'; Rosana 46'	Report		Stadium: Volkswagen-Arena; Attendance: 26,067; Referee: Kari Seitz (United States)

6 July 2011 World Cup group stage	Equatorial Guinea	0–3	Brazil	Frankfurt, Germany
18:00		Report	Érika 49'; Cristiane 54', 90+3' (pen.)	Stadium: Commerzbank-Arena; Attendance: 35,859; Referee: Bibiana Steinhaus (Germany)

10 July 2011 World Cup; Quarterfinals	Brazil	2–2 (a.e.t.) (3–5 p)	United States	Dresden, Germany
17:30	Marta 68' (pen.), 92'	Report	Daiane 2' (o.g.); Wambach 120+2'	Stadium: Rudolf-Harbig-Stadion; Attendance: 25,598; Referee: Jacqui Melksham (Australia)
	Penalties
	Cristiane (penalty scored); Marta (penalty scored); Daiane (penalty missed); Francielle (penalty scored)		(penalty scored) Boxx; (penalty scored) Lloyd; (penalty scored) Wambach; (penalty scored) Rapinoe; (penalty scored) Krieger

18 October 2011 Pan American Games group stage	Argentina	0–2	Brazil	Guadalajara, Mexico
17:00		Report	Guedes 27'; Batista 37'	Stadium: Estadio Omnilife; Referee: Lucila Venegas (Mexico)

20 October 2011 Pan American Games group stage	Brazil	2–1	Costa Rica	Guadalajara, Mexico
17:00	Oliveira 59'; Guedes 62'	Report	Cruz 90+5'	Stadium: Estadio Omnilife; Referee: Diane Ferreiras (Guyana)

22 October 2011 Pan American Games group stage	Brazil	0–0	Canada	Guadalajara, Mexico
20:00		Report		Stadium: Estadio Omnilife; Referee: Irasema Aguilera (Cuba)

25 October 2011 Pan American Games; Semifinals	Mexico	0–1	Brazil	Guadalajara, Mexico
17:00		Report	Maurine 79'	Stadium: Estadio Omnilife; Referee: Irasema Aguilera (Cuba)

27 October 2011 Pan American Games; Final	Brazil	1–1 (a.e.t.) (3–4 p)	Canada	Guadalajara, Mexico
17:45	Oliveira 3'	Report	Sinclair 87'	Stadium: Estadio Omnilife; Referee: Diane Ferreiras (Guyana)
	Penalties
	Francielle (penalty scored); Maurine (penalty scored); Grazielle (penalty missed); Wiggers (penalty scored); Débora (penalty missed)		(penalty scored) Matheson; (penalty scored) Sinclair; (penalty scored) Booth; (penalty scored) Schmidt; (penalty missed) Chapman

8 December 2011 Torneio Internacional Feminino	Brazil	5–1	Italy	São Paulo, Brazil
	Érika 19'; Ester 61'; Cristiane 68'; Marta 89'; Aline 90'	Report	Tona 18'	Stadium: Estádio do Pacaembu

11 December 2011 Torneio Internacional Feminino	Brazil	4–0	Chile	São Paulo, Brazil
	Érika 3'; Rosana 21'; Thaís Guedes 24'; Fabi 55'	Report		Stadium: Estádio do Pacaembu

15 December 2011 Torneio Internacional Feminino	Brazil	0–1	Denmark	São Paulo, Brazil
		Report	Nilsen 75'	Stadium: Estádio do Pacaembu

18 December 2011 Torneio Internacional Feminino; Final	Denmark	1–2	Brazil	São Paulo, Brazil
	Harder 54'		Érika 64', 74'	Stadium: Estádio do Pacaembu

The Brazil women's national football team competed in the following competitions in 2011:

Competition	Performance
FIFA World Cup	Quarterfinals
Pan American Games	Runner-up
Torneio Internacional Feminino	Champions

=== Copa do Brasil de Futebol Feminino ===
The 2011 Copa do Brasil de Futebol Feminino started on August 18, 2011, and concluded on November 26, 2011.

1 December 2011

Vitória-PE	0–2	Foz Cataratas

Estádio Severino Carneiro

4 December 2011

Foz Cataratas	3–0	Vitória-PE

Estádio Pedro Basso

Foz Cataratas declared as the cup champions by aggregate score of 5–0.

=== Domestic competition champions ===
Competition	Champion
Campeonato Carioca	CEPE
Campeonato Paulista	Santos

=== Other competition champions ===
Competition	Champion
Torneio Internacional Interclubes	Santos

=== Brazilian clubs in international competitions ===
Team	2011 Copa Libertadores Femenina
Duque de Caxias/CEPE	First stage
Santos	Third place defeated (Venezuela) Caracas
São José	Champions defeated (Chile) Colo Colo
