= Campeonato Tocantinense Second Division =

Football league in Tocantins, Brazil

- Organising body: FTF
- Founded: 2009; 17 years ago
- Country: Brazil
- State: Tocantins
- Level on pyramid: 2
- Promotion to: Campeonato Tocantinense
- Current champions: Palmas (1st title) (2025)
- Most championships: Araguaína; Guaraí; Gurupi; Tocantins de Miracema (2 titles each)
- Website: FTF Official website

The Campeonato Tocantinense Second Division is the second tier of the professional state football league in the Brazilian state of Tocantins. It is run by the Tocantins Football Federation (FTF).

== List of Champions ==
Season	Champions	Runners-up
2009	Interporto (1)	São José
2010	Guaraí (1)	Palmas
2011	Tocantins de Palmas (1)	Colinas
2012	Araguaína (1)	Palmas
2013	Tocantins de Miracema (1)	Araguaína
2014	Guaraí (2)	Paraíso
2015	Tocantins de Miracema (2)	Ricanato
2016	Sparta (1)	Colinas
2017	Araguaína (2)	Palmas
2018	Atlético Cerrado (1)	Força Jovem
2019	Capital (1)	Nova Conquista
2020	Gurupi (1)	Tocantins de Miracema
2021	União Carmolandense (1)	Bela Vista
2022	Gurupi (2)	Tocantins de Miracema
2023	Batalhão (1)	Araguaína
2024	Bela Vista (1)	Batalhão
2025	Palmas (1)	Guaraí

Names change

- Ricanato is the currently Capital FC.
- Nova Conquista is the currently NC Paraíso
- União Araguainense and União Carmolandense is the currently União Atlético Clube.

== Titles by team ==
Teams in bold stills active.

Rank	Club	Winners	Winning years
1	Araguaína	2	2012, 2017
1	Guaraí	2	2010, 2014
1	**Gurupi**	2	2020, 2022
1	**Tocantins de Miracema**	2	2013, 2015
5	Atlético Cerrado	1	2018
5	**Batalhão**	1	2023
5	**Bela Vista**	1	2024
5	**Capital**	1	2019
5	**Interporto**	1	2009
5	**Palmas**	1	2025
5	**Sparta**	1	2016
5	Tocantins de Palmas	1	2011
5	**União Carmolandense**	1	2021

=== By city ===
City	Championships	Clubs
Palmas	4	Batalhão (1), Capital (1), Palmas (1), Tocantins de Palmas (1)
Araguaína	3	Araguaína (2), Sparta (1)
Guaraí	2	Guaraí (2)
Gurupi	2	Gurupi (2)
Miracema do Tocantins	2	Tocantins de Miracema (2)
Cachoeirinha	1	Bela Vista (1)
Carmolândia	1	União Carmolandense (1)
Paraíso do Tocantins	1	Atlético Cerrado (1)
Porto Nacional	1	Interporto (1)
