= Italo (footballer, born 1991) =

Brazilian footballer

Ítalo
Personal information
- Full name: Ítalo Henrique Juvino da Silva
- Date of birth: 25 January 1991 (age 35)
- Place of birth: Recife, Brazil
- Height: 1.69 m (5 ft 7 in)
- Position: Left back

Team information
- Current team: Al-Hussein
- Number: 88

Senior career*
Years	Team	Apps	(Gls)
2010	Cabense		
2010–2011	ECUS		
2012	Limoeiro		
2012	Botafogo–PB		
2013	São João da Barra		
2013	Timbaúba		
2013–2014	Pesqueira		
2014	Mixto		
2015	Luziânia		
2015	Dom Bosco		
2015	Juara		
2016	Monte Azul		
2016	Palmas		
2017	Afogados	9	(0)
2017	Matonense	11	(1)
2017	Gurupi	6	(0)
2017	Noroeste	8	(0)
2018	Interporto	8	(2)
2018	Santa Cruz	0	(0)
2019	Rio Branco	2	(0)
2019	Goytacaz	8	(0)
2020	Fast Clube	20	(1)
2021	ASA de Arapiraca	18	(0)
2021	Interporto	4	(0)
2022	Santa Cruz	21	(0)
2022	America–PE	4	(1)
2023	Santa Cruz	15	(0)
2023	Jaguar	8	(3)
2023	Nova Iguaçu	5	(0)
2023–	Al-Hussein	6	(0)
- * Club domestic league appearances and goals as of 2 February 2017

Ítalo Henrique Juvino da Silva (born January 25, 1991, in Recife), simply known as Ítalo, is a Brazilian footballer who plays as left back for Jordanian Pro League side Al-Hussein. He played for national competitions such as Copa do Brasil and Campeonato Brasileiro Série D in the past.

== Career statistics ==
As of 2 February 2017

Club	Season	League			State League		Cup		Conmebol		Other		Total	
Club	Season	Division	Apps	Goals	Apps	Goals	Apps	Goals	Apps	Goals	Apps	Goals	Apps	Goals
Pesqueira	2014	Pernambucano	—		4	0	—		—		—		4	0
Mixto	2014	Matogrossense	—		—		2	0	—		1 (Note: All appearance(s) in Copa Verde)	0	3	0
Luziânia	2015	Brasiliense	—		—		0	0	—		2	0	2	0
Monte Azul	2016	Paulista A2	—		11	0	—		—		—		11	0
Palmas	2016	Série D	3	0	—		—		—		—		3	0
Afogados	2017	Pernambucano	—		1	0	—		—		—		1	0
Career total			3	0	16	0	2	0	0	0	3	0	24	0
