= Tocantins (disambiguation) =

Tocantins is a state in Brazil.

Tocantins may also refer to:

== Places and jurisdictions ==
- Tocantins River, a river in Brazil
- Tocantins basin, a drainage basin in Brazil
- Tocantins River (Jamanxim River), a river in Pará, Brazil
- Tocantins, Minas Gerais, a Brazilian municipality
- Territorial Prelature of São José de Alto Tocantins, a former Catholic pre-diocese in Brazil

== Sports and entertainment ==
- Survivor: Tocantins, a reality show set in Tocantins, Brazil
- Tocantins Esporte Clube, a Brazilian football (soccer) club
- Tocantins Esporte Clube (TO), a Brazilian football (soccer) club
- Tocantins Futebol Clube, a Brazilian football (soccer) club
