= 2018 in Brazilian football =

Football in Brazil
- Season: 2018

Men's football
- Série A: Palmeiras
- Série B: Fortaleza
- Série C: Operário Ferroviário
- Série D: Ferroviário
- Copa do Brasil: Cruzeiro

Women's football
- Série A1: Corinthians
- Série A2: Minas/ICESP

The following article presents a summary of the 2018 football season in Brazil, which was the 117th season of competitive football in the country.

== Campeonato Brasileiro Série A ==
The 2018 Campeonato Brasileiro Série A started on April 14, 2018, and is scheduled to end on December 2, 2018.

- América Mineiro
- Atlético Mineiro
- Atlético Paranaense
- Bahia
- Botafogo
- Ceará
- Chapecoense
- Corinthians
- Cruzeiro
- Flamengo
- Fluminense
- Grêmio
- Internacional
- Palmeiras
- Paraná
- Santos
- São Paulo
- Sport
- Vasco da Gama
- Vitória

Pos	Team	Pld	W	D	L	GF	GA	GD	Pts	Qualification or relegation
1	Palmeiras (C)	38	23	11	4	64	26	+38	80	Qualification for Copa Libertadores group stage
2	Flamengo	38	21	9	8	59	29	+30	72	Qualification for Copa Libertadores group stage
3	Internacional	38	19	12	7	51	29	+22	69	Qualification for Copa Libertadores group stage
4	Grêmio	38	18	12	8	48	27	+21	66	Qualification for Copa Libertadores group stage
5	São Paulo	38	16	15	7	46	34	+12	63	Qualification for Copa Libertadores second stage
6	Atlético Mineiro	38	17	8	13	56	43	+13	59	Qualification for Copa Libertadores second stage
7	Atlético Paranaense	38	16	9	13	54	37	+17	57	Qualification for Copa Libertadores group stage (Note: Atlético Paranaense qualified for the Copa Libertadores group stage by winning the 2018 Copa Sudamericana.)
8	Cruzeiro	38	14	11	13	34	34	0	53	Qualification for Copa Libertadores group stage (Note: Cruzeiro qualified for the Copa Libertadores group stage by winning the 2018 Copa do Brasil.)
9	Botafogo	38	13	12	13	38	46	−8	51	Qualification for Copa Sudamericana first stage
10	Santos	38	13	11	14	46	40	+6	50	Qualification for Copa Sudamericana first stage
11	Bahia	38	12	12	14	39	41	−2	48	Qualification for Copa Sudamericana first stage
12	Fluminense	38	12	9	17	32	46	−14	45	Qualification for Copa Sudamericana first stage
13	Corinthians	38	11	11	16	34	35	−1	44	Qualification for Copa Sudamericana first stage
14	Chapecoense	38	11	11	16	34	50	−16	44	Qualification for Copa Sudamericana first stage
15	Ceará	38	10	14	14	32	38	−6	44	
16	Vasco da Gama	38	10	13	15	41	48	−7	43	
17	América Mineiro (R)	38	10	10	18	30	47	−17	40	Relegation to Campeonato Brasileiro Série B
18	Sport (Note: Sport were deducted three points for the late payment of salary of player Gabriel.) (R)	38	11	9	18	35	57	−22	39	Relegation to Campeonato Brasileiro Série B
19	Vitória (R)	38	9	10	19	36	63	−27	37	Relegation to Campeonato Brasileiro Série B
20	Paraná (R)	38	4	11	23	18	57	−39	23	Relegation to Campeonato Brasileiro Série B

Source: CBF
Rules for classification: 1) points; 2) wins; 3) goal difference; 4) goals scored; 5) head-to-head results; 6) least red cards received; 7) least yellow cards received; 8) draw.
(C) Champions; (R) Relegated
Notes:

Palmeiras won the league.

=== Relegation ===
The four worst placed teams, Sport, América Mineiro, Vitória and Paraná, were relegated to the following year's second level.

== Campeonato Brasileiro Série B ==
The 2018 Campeonato Brasileiro Série B started on April 13, 2018, and concluded on November 24, 2018.

- Atlético Goianiense
- Avaí
- Boa Esporte
- Brasil de Pelotas
- Coritiba
- CRB
- Criciúma
- CSA
- Figueirense
- Fortaleza
- Goiás
- Guarani
- Juventude
- Londrina
- Oeste
- Paysandu
- Ponte Preta
- Sampaio Corrêa
- São Bento
- Vila Nova

Pos	Team	Pld	W	D	L	GF	GA	GD	Pts	Promotion or relegation
1	Fortaleza (C, P)	38	21	8	9	54	33	+21	71	Promotion to 2019 Campeonato Brasileiro Série A
2	CSA (P)	38	17	11	10	51	37	+14	62	Promotion to 2019 Campeonato Brasileiro Série A
3	Avaí (P)	38	16	13	9	50	32	+18	61	Promotion to 2019 Campeonato Brasileiro Série A
4	Goiás (P)	38	18	6	14	54	50	+4	60	Promotion to 2019 Campeonato Brasileiro Série A
5	Ponte Preta	38	16	12	10	42	30	+12	60	
6	Atlético Goianiense	38	16	11	11	57	51	+6	59	
7	Vila Nova	38	14	15	9	41	36	+5	57	
8	Londrina	38	15	10	13	45	42	+3	55	
9	Guarani	38	14	12	12	44	39	+5	54	
10	Coritiba	38	13	13	12	40	44	−4	52	
11	Brasil de Pelotas	38	13	11	14	36	35	+1	50	
12	CRB	38	12	12	14	35	39	−4	48	
13	São Bento	38	11	14	13	41	41	0	47	
14	Criciúma	38	11	14	13	45	49	−4	47	
15	Figueirense	38	11	13	14	48	51	−3	46	
16	Oeste	38	9	19	10	36	40	−4	46	
17	Paysandu (R)	38	10	13	15	42	53	−11	43	Relegation to 2019 Campeonato Brasileiro Série C
18	Sampaio Corrêa (R)	38	10	8	20	32	47	−15	38	Relegation to 2019 Campeonato Brasileiro Série C
19	Juventude (R)	38	7	14	17	27	48	−21	35	Relegation to 2019 Campeonato Brasileiro Série C
20	Boa Esporte (R)	38	7	9	22	26	49	−23	30	Relegation to 2019 Campeonato Brasileiro Série C

Source: CBF
Rules for classification: 1) points; 2) wins; 3) goal difference; 4) goals scored; 5) head-to-head results; 6) least red cards received; 7) least yellow cards received; 8) draw.
(C) Champions; (P) Promoted; (R) Relegated

Fortaleza won the league.

=== Promotion ===
The four best placed teams, Fortaleza, CSA, Avaí and Goiás, were promoted to the following year's first level.

=== Relegation ===
The four worst placed teams, Paysandu, Sampaio Corrêa, Juventude and Boa Esporte, were relegated to the following year's third level.

== Campeonato Brasileiro Série C ==
The 2018 Campeonato Brasileiro Série C started on April 14, 2018, and concluded on September 22, 2018.

- ABC
- Atlético Acreano
- Botafogo (PB)
- Botafogo (SP)
- Bragantino
- Confiança
- Cuiabá
- Globo
- Joinville
- Juazeirense
- Luverdense
- Náutico
- Operário Ferroviário
- Remo
- Salgueiro
- Santa Cruz
- Tombense
- Tupi
- Volta Redonda
- Ypiranga

The Campeonato Brasileiro Série C final was played between Operário Ferroviário and Cuiabá.

September 16, 2018

Operário Ferroviário	3–3	Cuiabá

Estádio Germano Krüger, Ponta Grossa

September 22, 2018

Cuiabá	0–1	Operário Ferroviário

Arena Pantanal, Cuiabá

Operário Ferroviário won the league after beating Cuiabá

=== Promotion ===
The four best placed teams, Operário Ferroviário, Cuiabá, Botafogo (SP) and Bragantino, were promoted to the following year's second level.

=== Relegation ===
The four worst placed teams, Tupi, Juazeirense, Salgueiro and Joinville, were relegated to the following year's fourth level.

== Campeonato Brasileiro Série D ==
The 2018 Campeonato Brasileiro Série D started on April 21, 2018, and concluded on August 4, 2018.

- 4 de Julho
- Altos
- América de Natal
- Americano
- Aparecidense
- ASA
- ASSU
- Atlético Itapemirim
- Barcelona
- Baré
- Belo Jardim
- Brasiliense
- Brusque
- Caldense
- Campinense
- Caxias
- Ceilândia
- Central
- Cianorte
- Cordino
- Corumbaense
- Dom Bosco
- Espírito Santo
- Ferroviária
- Ferroviário
- Flamengo de Arcoverde
- Fluminense de Feira
- Guarani de Juazeiro
- Imperatriz
- Independente
- Internacional de Lages
- Interporto
- Iporá
- Itabaiana
- Itumbiara
- Jacuipense
- Linense
- Macaé
- Macapá
- Madureira
- Manaus
- Maringá
- Mirassol
- Mogi Mirim
- Moto Club
- Murici
- Nacional
- Nova Iguaçu
- Novo Hamburgo
- Novoperário
- Novorizontino
- Plácido de Castro
- Prudentópolis
- Real Ariquemes
- Rio Branco (AC)
- Santa Rita
- Santos (AP)
- São José (RS)
- São Raimundo (PA)
- São Raimundo (RR)
- Sergipe
- Sinop
- Sparta
- Treze
- Tubarão
- Uberlândia
- URT
- Vitória da Conquista

The Campeonato Brasileiro Série D final was played between Ferroviário and Treze.

July 30, 2018

Ferroviário	3–0	Treze

Castelão, Fortaleza

August 4, 2018

Treze	1–0	Ferroviário

Amigão, Campina Grande

Ferroviário won the league after defeating Treze.

=== Promotion ===
The four best placed teams, Ferroviário, Treze, São José (RS) and Imperatriz, were promoted to the following year's third level.

== Domestic cups ==
=== Copa do Brasil ===
The 2018 Copa do Brasil started on January 30, 2018, and concluded on October 17, 2018. The Copa do Brasil final was played between Cruzeiro and Corinthians.

October 10, 2018

Cruzeiro	1–0	Corinthians

Mineirão, Belo Horizonte

October 17, 2018

Corinthians	1–2	Cruzeiro

Arena Corinthians, São Paulo

Cruzeiro won the cup after defeating Corinthians.

=== Copa do Nordeste ===
The competition featured 20 clubs from the Northeastern region. It started on August 15, 2017, and concluded on July 7, 2018. The Copa do Nordeste final was played between Sampaio Corrêa and Bahia.

July 4, 2018

Sampaio Corrêa	1–0	Bahia

Castelão, São Luís

July 7, 2018

Bahia	0–0	Sampaio Corrêa

Arena Fonte Nova, Salvador

Sampaio Corrêa won the cup after defeating Bahia.

=== Copa Verde ===
The competition featured 18 clubs from the North and Central-West regions, including the Espírito Santo champions. It started on January 21, 2018, and concluded on May 16, 2018. The Copa Verde final was played between Paysandu and Atlético Itapemirim.

April 25, 2018

Atlético Itapemirim	0–2	Paysandu

Estádio Kléber Andrade, Cariacica

May 16, 2018

Paysandu	1–1	Atlético Itapemirim

Mangueirão, Belém

Paysandu won the cup after defeating Atlético Itapemirim.

== State championship champions ==
State	Champions
(Acre (state)) Acre	Rio Branco
Alagoas	CSA
Amapá	Ypiranga
(Amazonas (Brazilian state)) Amazonas	Manaus
Bahia	Bahia
Ceará	Ceará
(Federal District (Brazil)) Distrito Federal	Sobradinho
Espírito Santo	Serra
Goiás	Goiás
Maranhão	Moto Club
Mato Grosso	Cuiabá
Mato Grosso do Sul	Operário
Minas Gerais	Cruzeiro
Pará	Remo
Paraíba	Botafogo
(Paraná (state)) Paraná	Atlético Paranaense
Pernambuco	Náutico
Piauí	Altos
(Rio de Janeiro (state)) Rio de Janeiro	Botafogo
Rio Grande do Norte	ABC
Rio Grande do Sul	Grêmio
Rondônia	Real Ariquemes
Roraima	São Raimundo
(Santa Catarina (state)) Santa Catarina	Figueirense
(São Paulo (state)) São Paulo	Corinthians
Sergipe	Sergipe
Tocantins	Palmas

== State cup competition champions ==
Competition	Champions
Copa Espírito Santo	Vitória
Copa Fares Lopes	Ferroviário
Copa FGF	Avenida
Copa FMF (MA)	Maranhão
Copa FMF (MT)	Mixto
Copa Paulista	Votuporanguense
Copa Rio	Americano
Copa Santa Catarina	Brusque

== Youth competition champions ==
Competition	Champions
Campeonato Brasileiro de Aspirantes	São Paulo
Campeonato Brasileiro Sub-20	Palmeiras
Copa do Brasil Sub-17^{(1)}	Flamengo
Copa do Brasil Sub-20	São Paulo
Copa RS de Futebol Sub-20	Palmeiras
Copa Santiago de Futebol Juvenil	Palmeiras
Copa São Paulo de Futebol Júnior	Flamengo
Supercopa do Brasil Sub-20	São Paulo
Taça Belo Horizonte de Juniores	Atlético Mineiro
Copa 2 de Julho Sub-15	Sport

^{(1)} The Copa Nacional do Espírito Santo Sub-17, between 2008 and 2012, was named Copa Brasil Sub-17. The similar named Copa do Brasil Sub-17 is organized by the Brazilian Football Confederation and it was first played in 2013.

== Brazilian clubs in international competitions ==
Team	2018 Copa Libertadores	2018 Copa Sudamericana	2018 Recopa Sudamericana
Atlético Mineiro	N/A	First Stage eliminated by (Argentina) San Lorenzo	N/A
Atlético Paranaense	N/A	Champions defeated (Colombia) Junior	N/A
Bahia	N/A	Quarter-finals eliminated by (Brazil) Atlético Paranaense	N/A
Botafogo	N/A	Round of 16 eliminated by (Brazil) Bahia	N/A
Chapecoense	Second Stage eliminated by (Uruguay) Nacional	N/A	N/A
Corinthians	Round of 16 eliminated by (Chile) Colo-Colo	N/A	N/A
Cruzeiro	Quarter-finals eliminated by (Argentina) Boca Juniors	N/A	N/A
Flamengo	Round of 16 eliminated by (Brazil) Cruzeiro	N/A	N/A
Fluminense	N/A	Semi-finals eliminated by (Brazil) Atlético Paranaense	N/A
Grêmio	Semi-finals eliminated by (Argentina) River Plate	N/A	Champions defeated (Argentina) Independiente
Palmeiras	Semi-finals eliminated by (Argentina) Boca Juniors	N/A	N/A
Santos	Round of 16 eliminated by (Argentina) Independiente	N/A	N/A
São Paulo	N/A	Second Stage eliminated by (Argentina) Colón	N/A
Vasco da Gama	Eliminated in the Group Stage	Second Stage eliminated by (Ecuador) LDU Quito	N/A

== Brazil national team ==
The following table lists all the games played by the Brazilian national team in official competitions and friendly matches during 2018.

=== Friendlies ===
March 23	Russia	0–3	Brazil	Moscow, Russia
13:00 UTC−3		Report	Miranda 53'; Philippe Coutinho 62' (pen.); Paulinho 66'	Stadium: Luzhniki Stadium; Attendance: 59,263; Referee: Aleksei Kulbakov (Belarus)

March 27	Germany	0–1	Brazil	Berlin, Germany
15:45 UTC−3		Report	Gabriel Jesus 37'	Stadium: Olympiastadion; Attendance: 72,717; Referee: Jonas Eriksson (Sweden)

June 3	Croatia	0–2	Brazil	Liverpool, England
11:00 UTC−3		Report	Neymar 69'; Roberto Firmino 90+3'	Stadium: Anfield; Attendance: 42,000; Referee: Michael Oliver (England)

June 10	Austria	0–3	Brazil	Vienna, Austria
11:00 UTC−3		Report	Gabriel Jesus 36'; Neymar 63'; Philippe Coutinho 69'	Stadium: Ernst-Happel-Stadion; Referee: Viktor Kassai (Hungary)

September 7	United States	0–2	Brazil	East Rutherford, United States
21:00 UTC−3		Report	Roberto Firmino 11'; Neymar 43' (pen.)	Stadium: MetLife Stadium; Attendance: 32,489; Referee: Fernando Guerrero (Mexico)

September 11	Brazil	5–0	El Salvador	Landover, United States
21:30 UTC−3	Neymar 4' (pen.); Richarlison 16', 50'; Philippe Coutinho 30'; Marquinhos 90'	Report		Stadium: FedExField; Referee: Jair Marrufo (United States)

October 12	Saudi Arabia	0–2	Brazil	Riyadh, Saudi Arabia
15:00 UTC−3		Report	Gabriel Jesus 43'; Alex Sandro 90+6'	Stadium: King Saud University Stadium; Attendance: 23,401; Referee: Danny Makkelie (Netherlands)

October 16	Brazil	1–0	Argentina	Jeddah, Saudi Arabia
15:00 UTC−3	Miranda 90+3'	Report		Stadium: King Abdullah Sports City; Referee: Felix Brych (Germany)

November 16	Brazil	1–0	Uruguay	London, England
18:00 UTC−2	Neymar 76' (pen.)	Report		Stadium: Emirates Stadium; Referee: Craig Pawson (England)

November 20	Brazil	1–0	Cameroon	Milton Keynes, England
17:30 UTC−2	Richarlison 45'	Report		Stadium: Stadium MK; Attendance: 29,669; Referee: Michael Oliver (England)

=== 2018 FIFA World Cup ===
June 17 Group E	Brazil	1–1	Switzerland	Rostov-on-Don, Russia
21:00 UTC+3	Philippe Coutinho 20'	Report	Zuber 50'	Stadium: Rostov Arena; Attendance: 43,109; Referee: César Ramos (Mexico)

June 22 Group E	Brazil	2–0	Costa Rica	Saint Petersburg, Russia
15:00 UTC+3	Philippe Coutinho 90+1'; Neymar 90+7'	Report		Stadium: Krestovsky Stadium; Attendance: 64,468; Referee: Björn Kuipers (Netherlands)

June 27 Group E	Serbia	0–2	Brazil	Moscow, Russia
21:00 UTC+3		Report	Paulinho 36'; Thiago Silva 68'	Stadium: Otkrytiye Arena; Attendance: 44,190; Referee: Alireza Faghani (Iran)

July 2 Round of 16	Brazil	2–0	Mexico	Samara, Russia
18:00 UTC+4	Neymar 51'; Roberto Firmino 88'	Report		Stadium: Cosmos Arena; Attendance: 41,970; Referee: Gianluca Rocchi (Italy)

July 6 Quarter-finals	Brazil	1–2	Belgium	Kazan, Russia
21:00 UTC+3	Renato Augusto 76'	Report	Fernandinho 13' (o.g.); De Bruyne 31'	Stadium: Kazan Arena; Attendance: 42,873; Referee: Milorad Mažić (Serbia)

== Women's football ==
=== National team ===
The following table lists all the games played by the Brazil women's national football team in official competitions and friendly matches during 2018.

The Brazil women's national football team competed in the following competitions in 2018:

==== Friendlies ====
September 2	Canada	1–0	Brazil	Ottawa, Canada
14:00 (EDT)	Prince 48'	Report		Stadium: TD Place Stadium; Attendance: 16,128; Referee: Francia González (Mexico)

October 6	England	1–0	Brazil	Nottingham, England
12:30 (BST)	Kirby 2'	Report		Stadium: Meadow Lane; Attendance: 7,864; Referee: Sandra Braz Bastos (Portugal)

November 10	France	3–1	Brazil	Nice, France
21:00 (CET)	Cascarino 23'; Bussaglia 47'; Renard 75'	Report	Darlene 90+4'	Stadium: Allianz Riviera; Attendance: 12,073; Referee: Marta Huerta de Aza (Spain)

==== 2018 Copa América ====
April 5 Group B	Brazil	3–1	Argentina	Coquimbo, Chile
19:00 (CLST)	Bia Zaneratto 17'; Cristiane 57' (pen.); Debinha 90'	Report	Banini 54'	Stadium: Estadio Municipal Francisco Sánchez Rumoroso; Referee: Claudia Umpiérrez (Uruguay)

April 7 Group B	Brazil	8–0	Ecuador	Coquimbo, Chile
19:00 (CLST)	Cristiane 10', 90+2'; Bia Zaneratto 21', 81'; Andressinha 48'; Formiga 65'; Rafaelle 70'; Debinha 86'	Report		Stadium: Estadio Municipal Francisco Sánchez Rumoroso; Referee: Dione Rissios (Chile)

April 11 Group B	Brazil	4–0	Venezuela	Coquimbo, Chile
19:00 (CLST)	Mônica 10'; Bia Zaneratto 38', 72'; Marta 82'	Report		Stadium: Estadio Municipal Francisco Sánchez Rumoroso; Referee: Olga Miranda (Paraguay)

April 13 Group B	Bolivia	0–7	Brazil	Coquimbo, Chile
19:00 (CLST)		Report	Érika 3', 65'; Andressinha 17', 54'; Andressa Alves 41'; Millene 80'; Aline Milene 82'	Stadium: Estadio Municipal Francisco Sánchez Rumoroso; Referee: Elizabeth Tintaya (Peru)

April 16 Final Stage	Brazil	3–1	Chile	La Serena, Chile
19:00 (CLST)	Mônica 21'; Bia Zaneratto 25'; Thaís 34'	Report	López 63'	Stadium: Estadio La Portada; Referee: Olga Miranda (Paraguay)

April 19 Final Stage	Brazil	3–0	Argentina	La Serena, Chile
16:45 (CLST)	Cristiane 47'; Thaisa 52'; Debinha 78'	Report		Stadium: Estadio La Portada; Referee: Susana Corella (Ecuador)

April 22 Final Stage	Brazil	3–0	Colombia	La Serena, Chile
19:00 (CLST)	Mônica 29', 71'; Clavijo 45+2' (o.g.)	Report		Stadium: Estadio La Portada; Referee: Sirley Cornejo (Bolivia)

==== 2018 Tournament of Nations ====
July 26	Brazil	1–3	Australia	Kansas City, United States
15:15 (CDT)	Debinha 79'	Report	Poliana 9' (o.g.); Butt 38'; Kerr 50'	Stadium: Children's Mercy Park; Attendance: 10,307; Referee: Christina Unkel (United States)

July 29	Japan	1–2	Brazil	East Hartford, United States
16:15 (EDT)	Masuya 90+3'	Report	Marta 76'; Bia Zaneratto 90'	Stadium: Pratt & Whitney Stadium; Attendance: 13,027; Referee: Katja Koroleva (United States)

August 2	United States	4–1	Brazil	Bridgeview, United States
19:30 (CDT)	Lavelle 33'; Ertz 53'; Heath 61'; Morgan 77'	Report	Davidson 16' (o.g.)	Stadium: Toyota Park; Attendance: 18,309; Referee: Quetzalli Alvarado (Mexico)

Competition	Performance
Copa América	Champions
Tournament of Nations	Third place

== Campeonato Brasileiro de Futebol Feminino Série A1 ==
The 2018 Campeonato Brasileiro de Futebol Feminino Série A1 started on April 25, 2018, and concluded on October 26, 2018.

- Audax
- Corinthians
- Ferroviária
- Flamengo/Marinha
- Foz Cataratas
- Iranduba
- Kindermann
- Pinheirense
- Ponte Preta
- Portuguesa (SP)
- Rio Preto
- Santos
- São Francisco
- São José
- Sport
- Vitória das Tabocas

The Campeonato Brasileiro de Futebol Feminino Série A1 final was played between Corinthians and Rio Preto.

20 October

Rio Preto	0–1	Corinthians

Estádio Anísio Haddad, São José do Rio Preto

26 October

Corinthians	4–0	Rio Preto

Estádio Parque São Jorge, São Paulo

Corinthians won the league after defeating Rio Preto.

=== Relegation ===
The two worst placed teams, Portuguesa (SP) and Pinheirense, were relegated to the following year's second level.

== Campeonato Brasileiro de Futebol Feminino Série A2 ==
The 2018 Campeonato Brasileiro de Futebol Feminino Série A2 started on March 24, 2018, and concluded on July 12, 2018.

- 3B da Amazônia
- América Mineiro
- Atlético Acreano
- Botafogo (PB)
- Canindé
- Caucaia
- Comercial (MS)
- Duque de Caxias
- Embu das Artes
- ESMAC
- Grêmio
- Gurupi
- Internacional
- Jaó
- Lusaca
- Minas/ICESP
- Napoli
- Náutico
- Porto (RO)
- Sampaio Corrêa
- Santana
- São Gonçalo (CE)
- São Raimundo (RR)
- Tiradentes
- Toledo/Ouro Verde
- UDA
- União (RN)
- Vila Nova (ES)
- Vitória

The Campeonato Brasileiro de Futebol Feminino Série A2 final was played between Minas/ICESP and Vitória.

July 8, 2018

Vitória	2–2	Minas/ICESP

Barradão, Salvador

July 12, 2018

Minas/ICESP	0–0	Vitória
Penalties
	4–3

Abadião, Ceilândia

Minas/ICESP won the league after defeating Vitória.

=== Promotion ===
The two best placed teams, Minas/ICESP and Vitória, were promoted to the following year's first level.

== Domestic competition champions ==
State	Champions
(Acre (state)) Acre	Atlético Acreano
Alagoas	UDA
Amapá	Oratório
(Amazonas (Brazilian state)) Amazonas	Iranduba
Bahia	Vitória
Ceará	Ceará
(Federal District (Brazil)) Distrito Federal	Minas/ICESP
Espírito Santo	Vila Nova
Goiás	Aliança
Maranhão	Santa Quitéria
Mato Grosso	Operário Ltda
Mato Grosso do Sul	Moreninhas
Minas Gerais	América Mineiro
Pará	ESMAC
Paraíba	Botafogo
(Paraná (state)) Paraná	Foz Cataratas
Pernambuco	Sport
Piauí	Tiradentes
(Rio de Janeiro (state)) Rio de Janeiro	Flamengo/Marinha
Rio Grande do Norte	Cruzeiro
Rio Grande do Sul	Grêmio
Rondônia	Porto Velho
Roraima	São Raimundo
(Santa Catarina (state)) Santa Catarina	Kindermann
(São Paulo (state)) São Paulo	Santos
Sergipe	Canindé
Tocantins	São Valério

== Brazilian clubs in international competitions ==
Team	2018 Copa Libertadores Femenina
Audax	Eliminated in the Group Stage
Iranduba	Third place defeated (Chile) Colo-Colo
Santos	Runners-up lost to (Colombia) Atlético Huila
