= Glauco (footballer, born 1993) =

Brazilian footballer

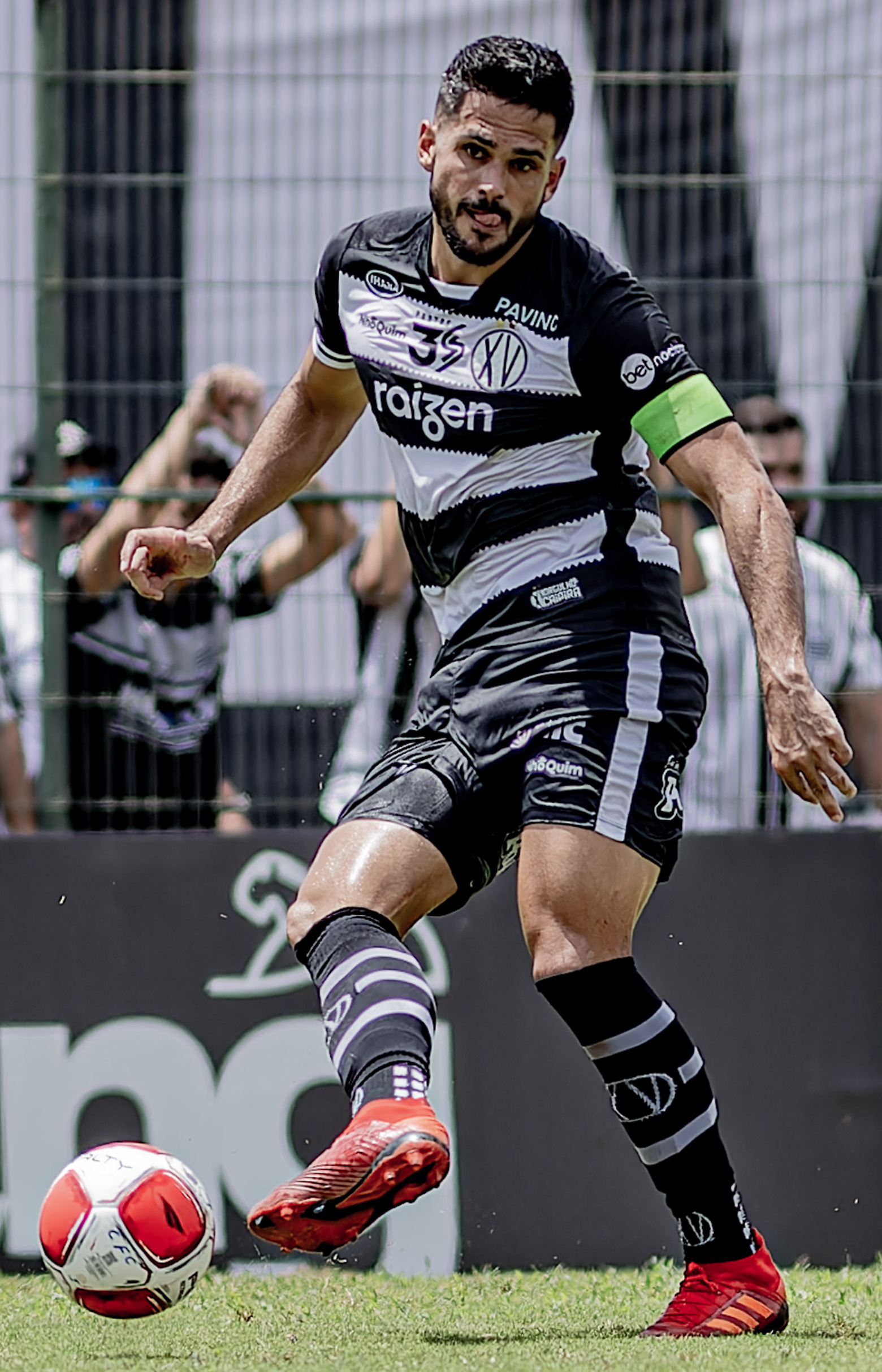
- Glauco playing for XV de Piracicaba in 2024

Personal information
- Full name: Glauco Nabor de Oliveira Toscano
- Date of birth: 29 April 1993 (age 33)
- Place of birth: São Paulo, Brazil
- Height: 1.88 m (6 ft 2 in)
- Position: Centre-back

Team information
- Current team: Uberlândia

Youth career
- Noroeste

Senior career*
Years	Team	Apps	(Gls)
2012	Rio Verde	0	(0)
2013–2014	J. Malucelli	1	(0)
2014	Rio Verde	1	(0)
2015	Anapolina	3	(0)
2015	Olímpia	25	(4)
2016	Marília	13	(0)
2016–2019	Desportivo Brasil	78	(5)
2019	América-GO	10	(1)
2020	Rio Preto	3	(0)
2020	Araguacema	1	(0)
2021	Linense	18	(0)
2021	Boa Esporte	7	(0)
2022	São José-SP	16	(0)
2022–2023	Marília	15	(0)
2023	Portuguesa Santista	0	(0)
2024	XV de Piracicaba	8	(0)
2024	Portuguesa	0	(0)
2025–	Uberlândia	0	(0)
- * Club domestic league appearances and goals as of 22:15, 3 May 2024 (UTC)

Glauco Nabor de Oliveira Toscano (born 29 April 1993), simply known as Glauco, is a Brazilian footballer who plays as a centre-back for Uberlândia.

== Career ==
Born in São Paulo, Glauco was a Noroeste youth graduate, but moved to Rio Verde for the 2012 Campeonato Goiano. After failing to make an appearance, he joined J. Malucelli in the following year, before returning to Rio Verde in 2014.

After starting the 2015 season at Anapolina, Glauco joined Olímpia on 29 April. He subsequently moved to Marília in December of that year, before signing for Desportivo Brasil in 2016.

After nearly four years at DB, Glauco left and joined América-GO in July 2019. In November, he was announced at Rio Preto, but moved to Araguacema in 2020 after featuring rarely.

Glauco left Araguacema in February 2021, after just one match, and was announced at Linense. On 9 July, after winning the year's Campeonato Paulista Série A3, he agreed to a contract with Série D side Boa Esporte.

On 21 October 2021, Glauco was announced at São José-SP for the ensuing campaign. He returned to Marília on 19 May 2022, being a regular starter before leaving on 17 May 2023.

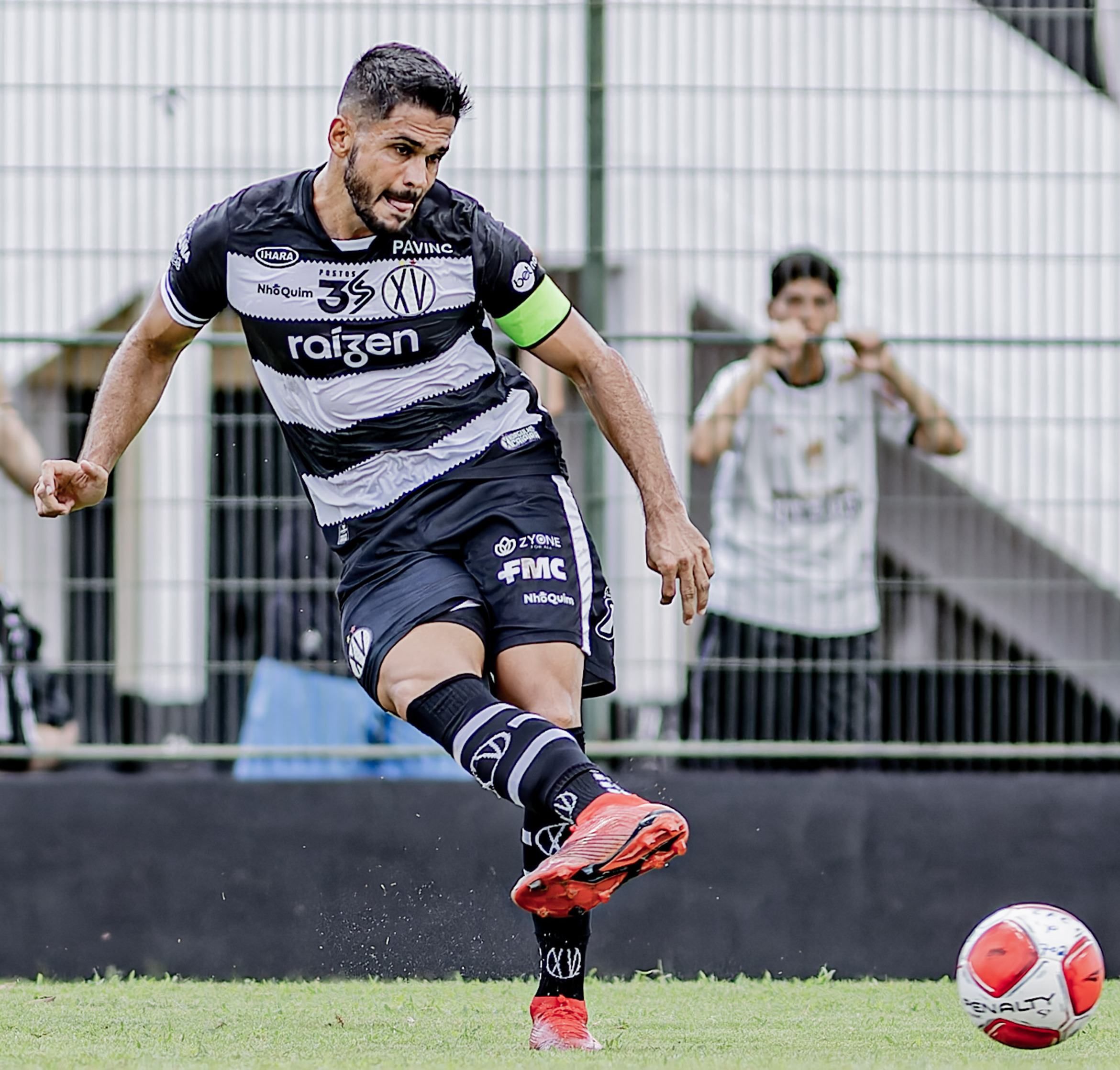
Glauco playing for XV de Piracicaba in 2024

On 2 June 2023, Glauco joined Portuguesa Santista for the year's Copa Paulista. He was announced at XV de Piracicaba on 8 November, but moved to Portuguesa on 1 May 2024.

== Career statistics ==
As of 15 November 2024

Club	Season	League			State League		Cup		Continental		Other		Total	
Club	Season	Division	Apps	Goals	Apps	Goals	Apps	Goals	Apps	Goals	Apps	Goals	Apps	Goals
Rio Verde	2012	Goiano	—		0	0	—		—		—		0	0
J. Malucelli	2013	Série D	0	0	1	0	—		—		—		1	0
J. Malucelli	2014	Paranaense	—		0	0	0	0	—		—		0	0
J. Malucelli	Total		0	0	1	0	0	0	—		—		1	0
Rio Verde	2014	Goiano 2ª Divisão	—		1	0	—		—		—		1	0
Anapolina	2015	Goiano	—		3	0	0	0	—		—		3	0
Olímpia	2015	Paulista 2ª Divisão	—		25	4	—		—		—		25	4
Marília	2016	Paulista A2	—		13	0	—		—		—		13	0
Desportivo Brasil	2016	Paulista 2ª Divisão	—		23	1	—		—		—		23	1
Desportivo Brasil	2017	Paulista A3	—		21	0	—		—		6 (Note: Appearance(s) in Copa Paulista)	0	27	0
Desportivo Brasil	2018	Paulista A3	—		17	1	—		—		5	0	22	1
Desportivo Brasil	2019	Paulista A3	—		17	3	—		—		—		17	3
Desportivo Brasil	Total		—		78	5	—		—		11	0	89	5
América-GO	2019	Goiano 2ª Divisão	—		10	1	—		—		—		10	1
Rio Preto	2020	Paulista A3	—		3	0	—		—		—		3	0
Araguacema	2020	Tocantinense	—		1	0	—		—		—		1	0
Linense	2021	Paulista A3	—		18	0	—		—		—		18	0
Boa Esporte	2021	Série D	7	0	—		—		—		—		9	0
São José-SP	2022	Paulista A3	—		16	0	—		—		—		16	0
Marília	2022	Paulista A3	—		—		—		—		12	1	12	1
Marília	2023	Paulista A3	—		15	0	0	0	—		—		15	0
Marília	Total		—		15	0	0	0	—		12	1	27	1
Portuguesa Santista	2023	Paulista A2	—		—		—		—		12	1	12	1
XV de Piracicaba	2024	Paulista A2	—		8	0	—		—		—		8	0
Portuguesa	2024	Paulista	—		—		—		—		3	0	3	0
Career total			7	0	192	10	0	0	0	0	38	1	237	11
