= Célio Mata-Boi =

Brazilian footballer

Personal information
- Full name: Mauricélio Holanda da Silva
- Date of birth: 16 October 1990 (age 36)
- Place of birth: Benjamin Constant, Brazil
- Height: 1.86 m (6 ft 1 in)
- Position: Forward

Senior career*
Years	Team	Apps	(Gls)
2011	Iranduba		
2012	São Raimundo-AM		
2013	Cordino		
2014	São Raimundo-AM		
2014	Clipper		
2015	São Raimundo-AM		
2015	Paraíso		
2015–2016	Serrano-BA		
2016	Paraíso		
2016	Palmas		
2017	4 de Julho		
2017	Sampaio Corrêa		
2018	4 de Julho		
2018	Araguaína		
2018–2019	Pinheiro-MA		
2020–2021	Tocantins de Miracema		
2021	Ypiranga-AP		
2022	Tupi-RS		
- * Club domestic league appearances and goals as of 12 January 2024

Mauricélio Holanda da Silva (born 16 October 1990), better known as Célio Mata-Boi is a Brazilian former professional footballer who played as a forward.

== Career ==
Striker, Célio Mata-Boi played most of his career for teams in the northern region. He gained prominence in the national news due to his unusual nickname in Brazilian football (Mata-Boi means "Bull killer", which originated due to the fact that the player already had work in a slaughterhouse), having most prominently defended the teams of São Raimundo, 4 de Julho, Sampaio Corrêa and Ypiranga-AP. His last professional club was Tupi de Crissiumal in 2022.

== Honours ==
Pinheiro

- Campeonato Maranhense Second Division: 2018
