= Celio =

Celio may refer to:

== People ==
- Célio Mata-Boi (born 1990), Mauricélio Holanda da Silva, Brazilian football player
- Elton Divino Celio (born 1987), Brazilian football player known as Eltinho
- Enrico Celio (1889-1980), Swiss politician
- Gaspare Celio (1571-1640), Italian painter
- Nello Celio (1914-1995), Swiss politician

== Places in Italy ==
- Caelian Hill (Italian Celio), one of the Seven Hills of Rome
- Celio, Lazio, a rione in the City of Rome

== Other ==
- Celio (retailer), French clothing retailer
- Celio Technology Corporation
