= Clube Atlético Cerrado =

Brazilian football club based in Tocantins

Atlético Cerrado
- Full name: Clube Atlético Cerrado
- Nickname(s): Lobo do Cerrado
- Founded: September 30, 2006 (18 years ago)
- Ground: Pereirão
- Capacity: 2,300
- President: Dyego Pereira Lima
- Head coach: Felipe Rodrigues
- League: Campeonato Brasileiro Série D Campeonato Tocantinense
- 2020: Tocantinense, 2nd
Home colors	Away colors

Clube Atlético Cerrado, commonly known as Sparta, is a Brazilian football club based in Paraíso do Tocantins, Tocantins state.

== Stadium ==
Atlético Cerrado play their home games at Pereirão. The stadium has a maximum capacity of 2,300 people.

== Honours ==
- Campeonato Tocantinense Second Division
  - Winners (1): 2018
