= União Atlético Clube =

União
- Full name: União Atlético Clube
- Founded: 27 May 1992; 34 years ago
- Ground: Mirandão
- President: Tiba
- Head coach: Luiz Carlos Prima
- League: Campeonato Tocantinense Segunda Divisão
- 2025 2025: Série D, 34th of 64; Tocantinense, 7th of 8 (relegated)
Home colors	Away colors	Third colors

União Atlético Clube, formerly known as União Araguainense and União Carmolandense, is a Brazilian football club from Araguaína, Tocantins state.

== History ==
Founded in 1992 in the city of Araguaína, it was state champion in 1994. He took a leave of absence from professional football for several years, returning in 2021 under the name União Carmolandense, operating in the city of Carmolândia. In 2024, it definitively changed its name to União Atlético Clube, becoming state champion for the second time in its history.

Originally the 2025 state champion, União AC was punished by the STJD (Brazilian Superior Court of Sports Justice) in September 2025 with a points deduction due to the irregular use of the player Sheik (Geykson Lopes Pereira), resulting in the annulment of the final phase of the tournament. In December, a new playoff phase was held, with Araguaína FR becoming the champion.

== Honours ==
- Campeonato Tocantinense
  - Winners (2): 1994, 2024
- Campeonato Tocantinense Second Division
  - Winners (1): 2021
