= Tiba (footballer) =

Brazilian footballer (born 1968)

Personal information
- Full name: Arione Ferreira Guedes
- Date of birth: 26 September 1968 (age 58)
- Place of birth: Araguaína, Brazil
- Height: 1.77 m (5 ft 10 in)
- Position: Forward

Team information
- Current team: União Carmolandense U20 (head coach)

Youth career
- 1984: Rio Branco-SP
- 1984–1988: Vasco da Gama

Senior career*
Years	Team	Apps	(Gls)
1988–1991	Vasco da Gama		
1989–1990	→ Bragantino (loan)		
1994–1994	Guarani		
1992	→ Bragantino (loan)		
1993	→ Paraná (loan)		
1994–1996	Portuguesa		
1996–1997	Corinthians	13	(5)
1998	Ituano		
1998	Portuguesa		
1999	São José-SP		
2000	Paysandu		
2000	Juventude		
2001	América-SP		

Managerial career
- 2015: Araguaína
- 2018: Grêmio Osasco U20
- 2025–: União Carmolandense U20
- 2025: União Carmolandense (interim)
- * Club domestic league appearances and goals

Arione Ferreira Guedes (born 26 September 1968), better known as Tiba, is a Brazilian football coach and former player who played as a forward. He is the current head coach of União Carmolandense's under-20 team.

== Career ==
Tiba began his career with Rio Branco de Americana, moving to Vasco da Gama afterwards. Loaned to Bragantino, in 1990 he had an outstanding year, becoming São Paulo champion with Tiba being the scorer of the title goal against Novorizontino, and elected to the Silver Ball. He also had notable spells at Portuguesa and Corinthians, where he played 13 matches and scored 6 goals.

== Honours ==
Bragantino

- Campeonato Paulista: 1990

Paraná

- Campeonato Paranaense: 1993

Individual

- 1990 Bola de Prata
