= Araguacema Futebol Clube =

Brazilian football club

Araguacema FC
- Full name: Araguacema Futebol Clube
- Nickname(s): Azulão do Norte
- Founded: 1990
- Ground: Arena Taça, Araguacema, Tocantins state, Brazil
- Capacity: 1.500
- President: Fábio Dias
- Head coach: Carlos Magno
- League: Campeonato Tocantinense
Home colours	Away colours	colours

Araguacema Futebol Clube, more commonly referred to as Araguacema FC, is a Brazilian professional football club based in Araguacema, Tocantins, that competes in the Campeonato Tocantinense, the top tier of the Tocantins state league.

== History ==
The club was founded on 1990.

After winning the state amateur championship title on four occasions, the board finally decided to professionalize the club's soccer team. The club debuted in professional football in 2019 when they played in the second division of Tocantins.

And in the club's first professional competition, Campeonato Tocantinense (2nd Division), the team finished in third place and ended up getting access to the first state division.

== Professional Championships ==
- 2021Tocantinense (1st Division) (In progress)
- 2020 Tocantinense (1st Division) (4th place)
- 2019 Tocantinense (2nd Division) (3rd place)
