= Estádio Nilton Santos (Palmas) =

Stadium in Brazil

- Interactive map of Estádio Nilton Santos
- Address: Palmas; Brazil
- Coordinates: 10.28186°S 48.33065°W
- Type: Stadium
- Current use: Association football

The Estádio Nilton Santos is a stadium in Palmas, Tocantins, Brazil that is home to Palmas Futebol e Regatas, Capital Futebol Clube, Associação Desportiva e Recreativa São José, Tocantins Futebol Clube, and Tubarão Esporte Clube.
