= Sport Club Guaraí =

Guaraí
- Full name: Sport Club Guaraí
- Nickname: Lobão (Wolf)
- Founded: September 7, 1983
- Ground: Delfinão, Guaraí, Tocantins state, Brazil
- Capacity: 3,500
Home colours	Away colours

Sport Club Guaraí, commonly known as Guaraí, is a Brazilian football club based in Guaraí, Tocantins state.

== History ==
Sport Club Guaraí was established on September 7th, 1983 by the doctor Aluísio Tenório Marques, an fanatic supporter of Sport Club do Recife, who had the idea of creating an amateur team at the city along with some of his friends at the moment. They were Tocantins' amateur champions in 2006 and 2008 with the name "Grêmio de Futebol Guaraiense", and in 2009 president Aírton Elvio Schefller together with the club directors professionalized the team.

Guaraí started at the second tier of Campeonato Tocantinense, being champions in 2010 against Palmas in the final and granting them access to play the first tier of the statechampionship in 2011. They were relegated in 2014, but came back with their second title in the same year against Paraíso. In 2015, after another relegation, Lobão only managed to come back to the first tier in 2025, after qualifying for the final against Palmas, where they lost.

== Honours ==
- Campeonato Tocantinense Second Division
  - Winners (2): 2010, 2014
