= Sociedade Desportiva Sparta =

Brazilian football club

Sparta
- Full name: Sociedade Desportiva Sparta
- Nickname: Tricolor do Norte
- Founded: 25 February 2006; 19 years ago
- Ground: Mirandão
- Capacity: 10,000
- President: Fernando Brasília
- Head coach: Nei César
- 2024: Tocantinense Segunda Divisão, 3rd of 13
- Website: http://www.arenadosparta.com.br
Home colors	Away colors	Third colors

Sociedade Desportiva Sparta, commonly known as Sparta, is a Brazilian football club based in Araguaína, Tocantins state.

Sparta is currently ranked fifth among Tocantins teams in CBF's national club ranking, at 205th place overall.

== Stadium ==
Rondoniense play their home games at Mirandão. The stadium has a maximum capacity of 10,000 people.

== Honours ==
- Campeonato Tocantinense Second Division
  - Winners (1): 2016
