= Boa Esporte Clube =

Brazilian association football club based in Varginha, Minas Gerais, Brazil

Boa Esporte
- Full name: Boa Esporte Clube
- Nickname: Coruja (Owl)
- Founded: 30 April 1947; 78 years ago (as Ituiutaba Esporte Clube); 2011; 15 years ago (as Boa Esporte Clube)
- Ground: Júlia do Prado
- Capacity: 15,471
- Chairman: Rone Moraes
- Manager: Luiz Gabardo Júnior
- League: Campeonato Mineiro Módulo II
- 2025: Mineiro Segunda Divisão, 2nd of 13 (promoted)
- Website: boaesporte.com.br
| Home colours | Away colours |

Boa Esporte Clube, commonly known as just Boa Esporte or Boa, is a Brazilian football club from Ituiutaba, Minas Gerais state. The club was formerly known as Ituiutaba Esporte Clube.

== History ==
The club was founded on 30 April 1947, in Ituiutaba city, as Ituiutaba Esporte Clube. They won the Campeonato Mineiro Módulo II in 2004, and the Taça Minas Gerais in 2007. They lost the Campeonato Brasileiro Série C to ABC Futebol Clube in 2010. During the 2011 season, the club played in Varginha, adopting the name Boa Esporte Clube, and will return to Ituiutaba after the new stadium is built. As Boa Esporte Clube, they won the Campeonato Mineiro Second Level in 2011.

Boa Esporte played the Série B between 2011 and 2015, almost being promoted to the first division in their debut year (when they were 4 points away from 4th placer Sport Recife), and in 2014 (2 points away from 4th placer Avaí FC). Despite being second to last in 2015, they were the surprise winners of the 2016 Série C.

In March 2017, the club came to international media attention for their signing of Bruno Fernandes de Souza. Bruno was convicted of dismembering his mistress, Eliza Samudio, in 2010 and feeding her remains to his pet dogs, in a dispute over child support. In March 2013, he was sentenced to 22 years, however, he was granted release on appeal. This signing led to multiple sponsors, such as Gois and Silva, dropping the club and has led to protests and outrage in Brazil. Bruno's signing while awaiting appeal has led to various Human Rights organizations to protest that clubs like Boa Esporte do not value women or abuses against them by players.

In 2024, the club announced its return to Ituiutaba.

== Honours ==
=== Official tournaments ===
National
| Competitions | Titles | Seasons |
|---|---|---|
| Campeonato Brasileiro Série C | 1 | 2016 |
State
| Competitions | Titles | Seasons |
| Taça Minas Gerais | 2 | 2007, 2012 |
| Campeonato Mineiro Módulo II | 2 | 2004, 2011 |

=== Others tournaments ===
==== State ====
- Campeonato Mineiro do Interior (3): 2009, 2014, 2019

=== Runners-up ===
- Campeonato Brasileiro Série C (1): 2010
- Taça Minas Gerais (1): 2011
- Campeonato Mineiro Módulo II (1): 2017
- Campeonato Mineiro Segunda Divisão (1): 2025

== Stadium ==
The club plays their home games at Estádio Municipal Prefeito Luiz Dilzon de Melo, commonly known as Melão. The stadium is located in Varginha, and has a maximum capacity of 27,000 people.

As Ituiutaba Esporte Clube, the club played their home games at Estádio da Fazendinha, located in Ituiutaba. The stadium has a maximum capacity of 3,840 people.

Upon returning to Ituiutaba, Boa Esporte began playing its home games at the Estádio Municipal Júlia do Prado. The team also used the Estádio Coleto de Paula, home of its neighbor Associação Esportiva Ituiutabana.

== Current squad ==
As of 13 September 2021 Note: Flags indicate national team as defined under FIFA eligibility rules; some limited exceptions apply. Players may hold more than one non-FIFA nationality.

| No. | Pos. | Nation | Player |
|---|---|---|---|
| — | GK | BRA | Alencar |
| — | GK | BRA | Ronaldo Zilio |
| — | GK | BRA | Tom |
| — | DF | BRA | Richard Volpato |
| — | DF | BRA | Gabriel Pinheiro |
| — | DF | BRA | Raul Cardoso (On loan from FC Cascavel) |
| — | DF | BRA | Glauco |
| — | DF | BRA | Alex Alves |
| — | DF | BRA | Tiago Dybala |
| — | MF | BRA | Douglas Pelé |
| — | MF | BRA | Alyson |
| — | MF | BRA | Romeu |

| No. | Pos. | Nation | Player |
|---|---|---|---|
| — | MF | BRA | Thiago Peralta |
| — | MF | BRA | Zé Augusto |
| — | MF | BRA | Aruá |
| — | MF | BRA | Cadu |
| — | MF | BRA | Iago Sampaio |
| — | MF | BRA | Fabinho |
| — | FW | BRA | Lucas Coelho |
| — | FW | BRA | Willian Mococa (On loan from Athletic Club (MG)) |
| — | FW | BRA | Neto Costa (On loan from Cianorte Futebol Clube) |
| — | FW | BRA | Vagner |
| — | FW | BRA | Stuart |
