= Celio Technology Corporation =

- Industry: Computer hardware
- Founded: November 22, 2006
- Defunct: March 1, 2011
- Headquarters: Salt Lake City, UT, United States
- Key people: Kirt Bailey, President and CEO
- Products: Celio Redfly
- Website: http://www.celiocorp.com/

Celio Technology Corporation was a smartphone terminal manufacturer headquartered in Salt Lake City, UT and responsible for the Redfly product line The company's dissolution date was March 1, 2011.
