= Associação Desportiva e Recreativa São José =

São José
- Full name: Associação Desportiva e Recreativa São José
- Founded: February 14, 1997 (28 years ago)
- Ground: Estádio Nilton Santos, Palmas, Tocantins state, Brazil
- Capacity: 10,000
Home colors	Away colors

Associação Desportiva e Recreativa São José, commonly known as São José, is a Brazilian football men's and women's club based in Palmas, Tocantins state. They competed in the Women's Copa do Brasil once.

== History ==
The club was founded on February 14, 1997, as an amateur team, becoming a professional team in 2006, when they affiliated to the CBF.

=== Women's team ===
The women's team competed in the 2009 edition of the Copa do Brasil de Futebol Feminino, when they were eliminated in the first round by Caucaia.

== Stadium ==
Associação Desportiva e Recreativa São José play their home games at Estádio Nilton Santos. The stadium has a maximum capacity of 10,000 people.
