= Tocantins Futebol Clube =

Tocantins
- Full name: Tocantins Futebol Clube
- Nickname(s): Tigrão da Serra
- Founded: October 10, 1999
- Ground: Nilton Santos, Palmas, Brazil
- Capacity: 12,000
- Head coach: Athirson
- League: –
- 2009: Campeonato Brasileiro Série D, eliminated in first stage
Home colours	Away colours

Tocantins Futebol Clube, also known as Tocantins, are a Brazilian football team from Palmas, Tocantins. They competed in the Série D in 2009.

== History ==
Tocantins Futebol Clube were founded on August 10, 1979. They won the Campeonato Tocantinense in 2008, beating Gurupi in the final. Tocantins competed in the Série D in 2009, when they were eliminated in the first stage.

== Stadium ==
Tocantins play their home games at Nilton Santos. The stadium has a maximum capacity of 12,000 people.

== Honours ==
- Campeonato Tocantinense
  - Winners (1): 2008
- Campeonato Tocantinense Second Division
  - Winners (1): 2011
