= Araguacema =

Municipality in Tocantins, Brazil

- Municipality
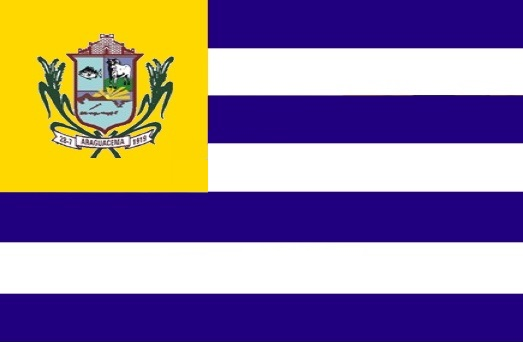
- Flag

- Location in Tocantins state

- Location in Brazil
- Coordinates: 8°48′29″S 49°33′24″W
- Country: Brazil
- Region: North
- State: Tocantins
- Mesoregion: Western Meso-region of Tocantins
- Microregion: Microregion of Miracema do Tocantins

Government
  - Mayor: Isabella Alves Simas (Democrats)

Area
  - Total: 2,778 km^{2} (1,073 sq mi)

Population (2020)
  - Total: 7,155
  - Density: 2.576/km^{2} (6.671/sq mi)
- Time zone: UTC−3 (BRT)
- Postal code: 77690-000
- Area code: +55 63
- Website: http://www.araguacema.to.gov.br/

Araguacema is a municipality located in the Brazilian state of Tocantins. Its population was 7,155 (2020) and its area is 2,778 km^{2}.

The municipality contains 17.15% of the 1,678,000-hectare (4,150,000-acre) Ilha do Bananal / Cantão Environmental Protection Area, created in 1997.

== See also ==
- List of municipalities in Tocantins
