= Carmolândia =

Municipality in Tocantins, Brazil

- Municipality
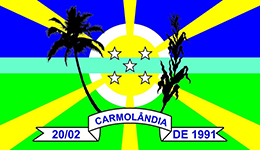
- Flag

- Location in Tocantins state

- Location in Brazil
- Coordinates: 7°1′58″S 48°23′45″W
- Country: Brazil
- Region: North
- State: Tocantins

Area
  - Total: 339 km^{2} (131 sq mi)

Population (2020)
  - Total: 2,603
  - Density: 7.68/km^{2} (19.9/sq mi)
- Time zone: UTC−3 (BRT)

Carmolândia is a municipality located in the Brazilian state of Tocantins. Its population was 2,603 (2020) and its area is 339 km^{2}.

== See also ==
- List of municipalities in Tocantins
