= Tocantins Esporte Clube =

Brazilian football club

Tocantins
- Full name: Tocantins Esporte Clube
- Nickname(s): Tecão Maravilha
- Founded: December 2, 1975
- Ground: Abadião, Imperatriz, Maranhão state, Brazil
- Capacity: 12,000
- President: Harlem Limeira
- Head coach: Gerson Americo
Home colors	Away colors

Tocantins Esporte Clube, commonly known as Tocantins, is a Brazilian football club based in Imperatriz, Maranhão state. They competed in the Série C once.

== History ==
The club was founded on December 2, 1975. Tocantins won the Campeonato Maranhense Second Level in 2001. The club competed in the Série C in 2002, when they were eliminated in the First Stage of the competition.

== Achievements ==
- Campeonato Maranhense Second Level:
  - Winners (1): 2001

== Stadium ==
Tocantins Esporte Clube play their home games at Estádio Frei Epifânio D'Abadia, nicknamed Abadião. The stadium has a maximum capacity of 12,000 people.
