= Paraíso Esporte Clube =

Paraíso EC
- Full name: Paraíso Esporte Clube
- Nickname(s): Touro Forte
- Founded: July 13, 1992
- Ground: Estádio José Pereira Rêgo, Paraíso do Tocantins
- Capacity: 2,300
- League: Campeonato Tocantinense
- 2010: Campeonato Tocantinense
Home colours	Away colours

Paraíso Esporte Clube is a Brazilian football club based in Paraíso do Tocantins, Tocantins state. The club was formerly known as Intercap Esporte Clube until 2006 although they played the 2009 Campeonato Tocantinense as Intercap. They competed in the Série C once.

== History ==
The club was founded on July 10, 1972. Intercap won the Campeonato Tocantinense in 1995, and competed in the Série C in the same year.

== Honours ==
=== State ===
- Campeonato Tocantinense
  - Winners (2): 1992, 1995
  - Runners-up (1): 1993

=== Women's Football ===
- Campeonato Tocantinense de Futebol Feminino
  - Winners (7): 1994, 2013, 2016, 2017, 2020, 2021, 2023

== Stadium ==
Paraíso Esporte Clube play their home games at Estádio José Pereira Rêgo, commonly known as Pereirão. The stadium has a maximum capacity of 2,300 people.
