= Guaraí =

Municipality in Tocantins, Brazil

Coordinates: 8°49′S 48°23′W

- Municipality
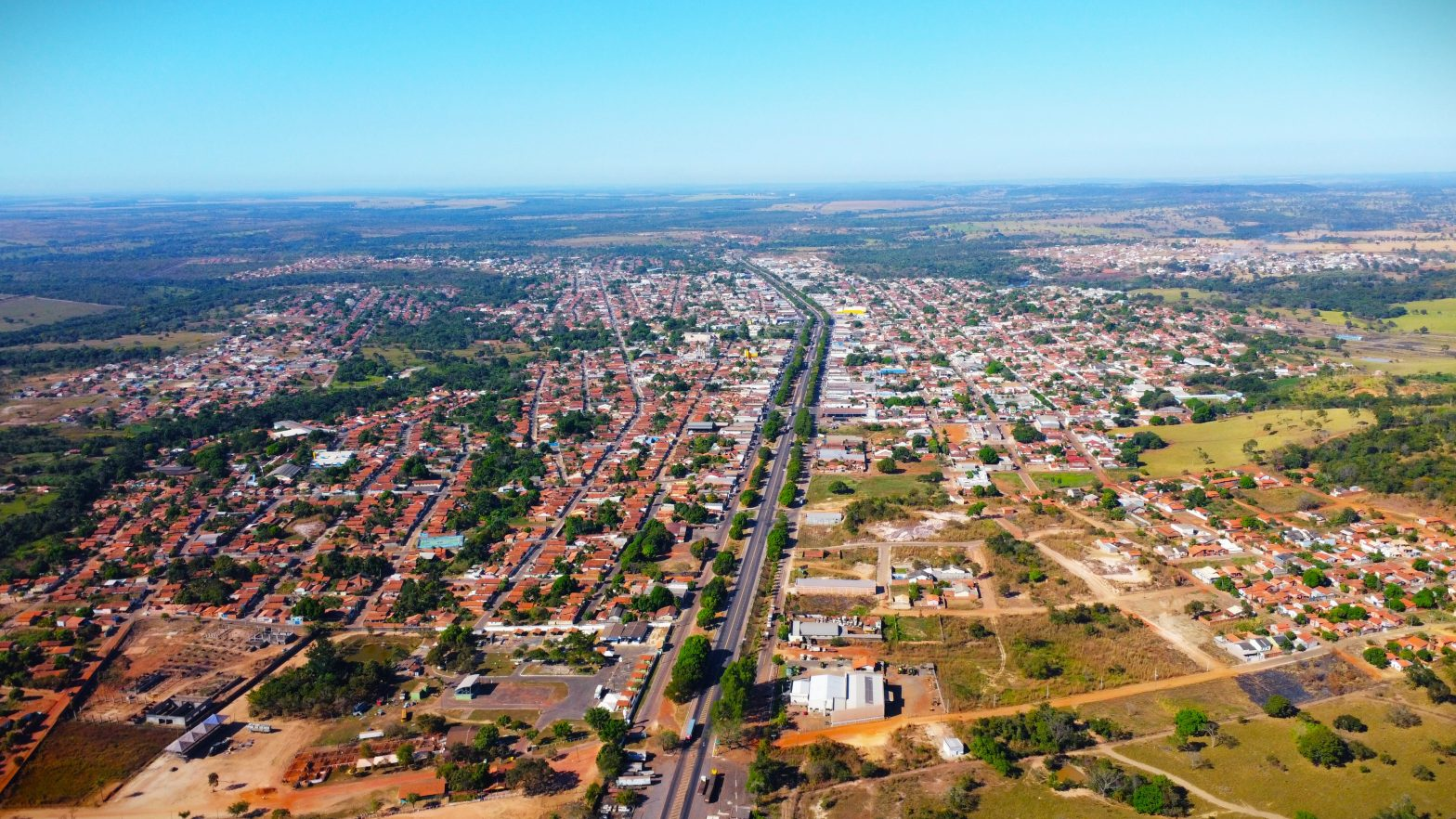

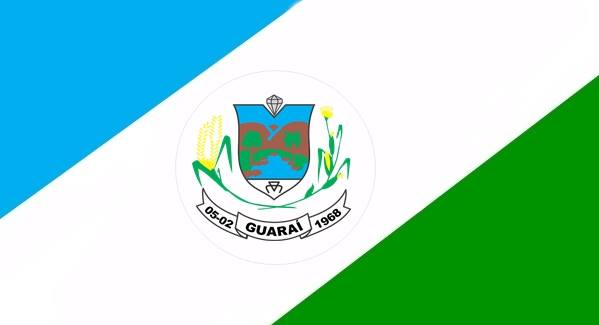
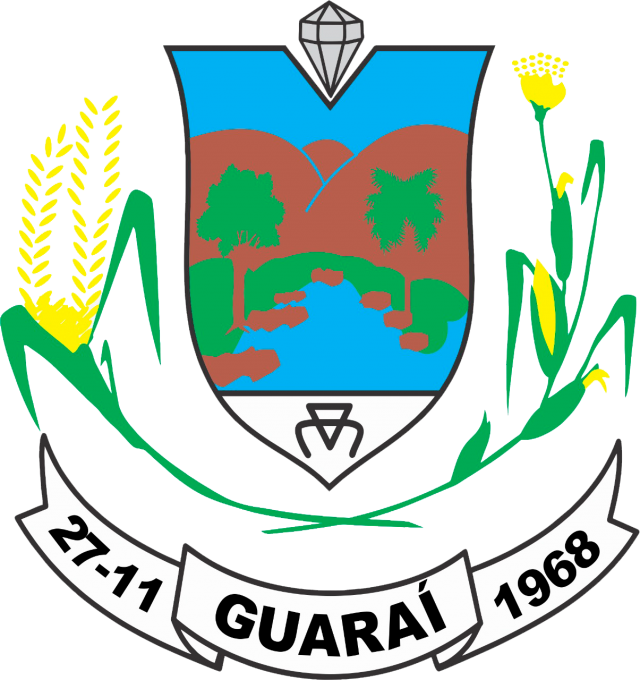
- Flag Coat of arms
- Interactive map of Guaraí
- Country: Brazil
- Region: Northern
- State: Tocantins
- Mesoregion: Ocidental do Tocantins

Population (2020)
  - Total: 26,165
- Time zone: UTC−3 (BRT)
- Website: https://guarai.to.gov.br

Guaraí is a municipality in the state of Tocantins in the Northern region of Brazil.

== See also ==
- List of municipalities in Tocantins
