= Capital Futebol Clube =

Brazilian football club

Capital
- Full name: Capital Futebol Clube
- Nicknames: Ricanato, Reizinho (Little King)
- Founded: May 21, 2012; 13 years ago
- Ground: Nilton Santos
- Capacity: 12,000
- President: Ricardo Carreira
- Head coach: Givanildo Alves
- League: Campeonato Tocantinense
- 2025: Tocantinense, 3rd of 8
- Website: www.capitalfc.com.br
Home colours	Away colours

Capital Futebol Clube, commonly known as Capital, is a Brazilian football club based in Palmas, Tocantins.

== History ==
Founded on 21 May 2012 as Ricanato Futebol Clube, entered in professional league in 2014 season. in the state second division. Achieving promotion to the first division in 2015, the club was also the Tocantins U-18 champion and played in the Copa São Paulo. Changed their name to Capital FC in 2016, aiming at greater projection in the media. In 2021, Capital achieved its best campaign in the state league (3rd place).

== Appearances ==
Following is the summary of Capital FC appearances in Campeonato Tocantinense.

Season	Division	Final position
2014	2nd	3rd
2015	2nd	2nd
2016	1st	6th
2017	1st	7th (relegated)
2017	2nd	4th
2018	2nd	5th
2019	2nd	1st
2020	1st	5th
2021	1st	7th
2022	1st	3rd
2023	1st	2nd
2024	1st	4th
2025	1st	3rd

The club also competed at national level, in the 2024 Copa do Brasil, beating Tocantinópolis in the local duel at first round and being eliminated by Águia de Marabá in the second round, and 2024 Campeonato Brasileiro Série D, where it was last placed in group A5.

== Honours ==
- Campeonato Tocantinense Second Division
  - Winners (2): 2019
