= Tocantins Esporte Clube (TO) =

Brazilian football club

Tocantins
- Full name: Tocantins Esporte Clube
- Nickname: Tecão de Aço
- Founded: March 10, 1993 (32 years ago)
- Ground: Castanheirão
- Capacity: 2,500
- President: Josenilton de Oliveira Dantas
- League: Campeonato Tocantinense
- 2022: 10th of 10 (relegated)
Home colors	Away colors

Tocantins Esporte Clube, commonly known as Tocantins or Tocantins de Miracema, is a Brazilian football club based in Miracema do Tocantins, Tocantins state.

Tocantins de Miracema is currently ranked sixth among Tocantins teams in CBF's national club ranking, at 228th place overall.

== History ==
Tocantins was founded in 1993. In its history, the club was champion twice in the second division of Campeonato Tocantinense.

== Honours ==
- Campeonato Tocantinense
  - Runners-up (2): 1994, 2016
- Campeonato Tocantinense Second Division
  - Winners (2): 2013, 2015

== Stadium ==
Tocantins play their home games at Castanheirão. The stadium has a maximum capacity of 2,500 people.
