= Miracema do Tocantins =

Municipality in Tocantins, Brazil

Miracema do Tocantins Krikahâ dawanã hã (Akwẽ-Xerente)
- Municipality
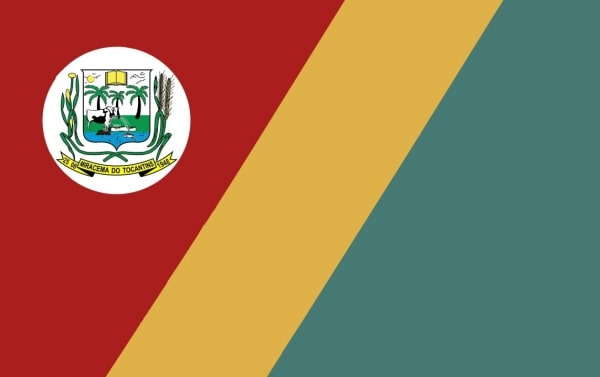
- Flag

- Location in Tocantins state

- Location in Brazil
- Coordinates: 9°34′1″S 48°23′31″W
- Country: Brazil
- Region: North
- State: Tocantins

Area
  - Total: 2,656 km^{2} (1,025 sq mi)

Population (2020)
  - Total: 17,936
  - Density: 6.753/km^{2} (17.49/sq mi)
- Time zone: UTC−3 (BRT)

Miracema do Tocantins (Xerénte: Krikahâ dawanã hã [kɾikahə dawanə̃ hə̃]) is a municipality of the Brazilian state of Tocantins. Its estimated population in 2020 was 17,936 inhabitants. It has an area of 2,656 km^{2} (1,025 sq mi) and an average elevation of 197 m (646 ft).

It was the state capital until 1990.

== See also ==
- List of municipalities in Tocantins
