= Paraíso do Tocantins =

Municipality in Tocantins, Brazil

- Municipality
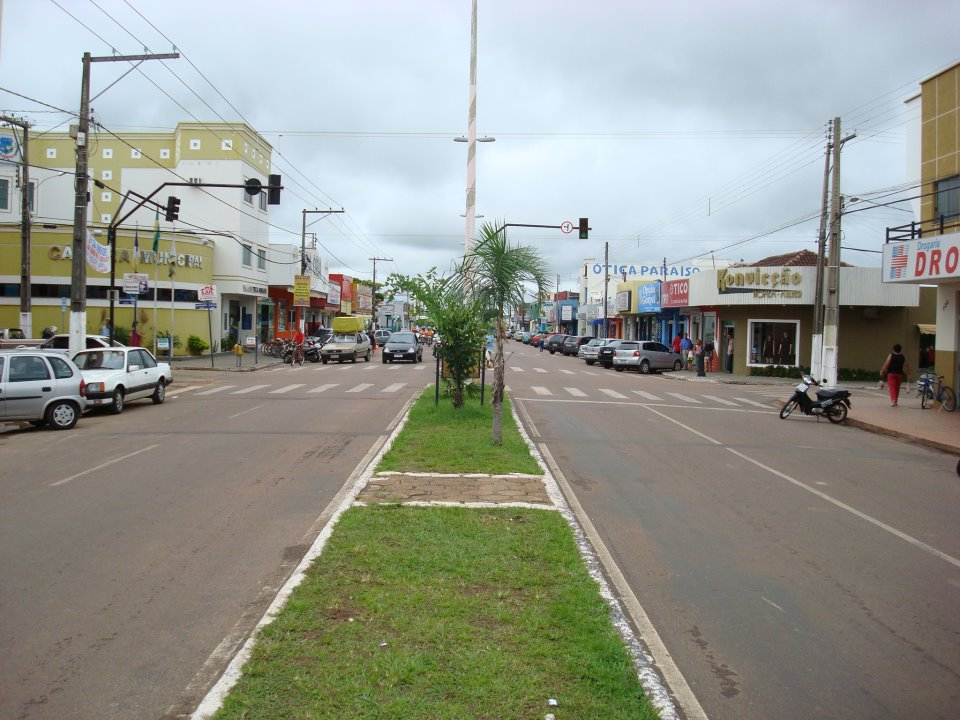
- A view of Avenida Bernado Sayao (Bernado Sayao Avenue)

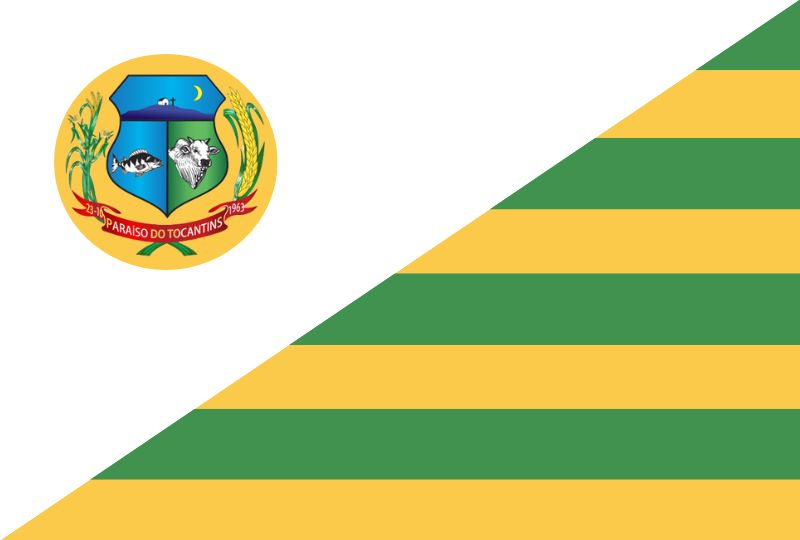
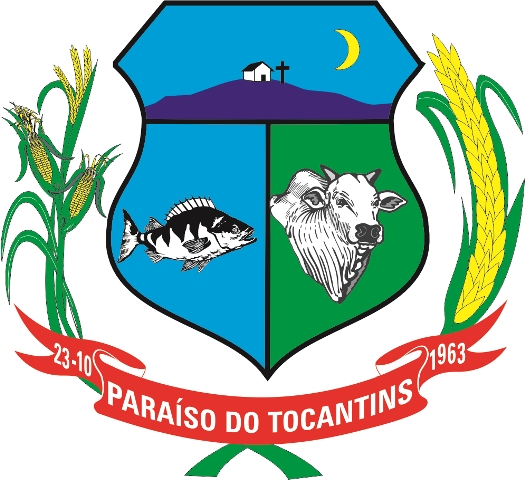
- Flag Coat of arms
- Motto: O desenvolvimento é agora (Development is Now)
- Coordinates: 10°11′S 48°48′W
- Country: Brazil
- Region: Northern
- State: Tocantins
- Mesoregion: Ocidental do Tocantins
- Founded: October 23, 1963

Area
  - Total: 1,297.018 km^{2} (500.781 sq mi)
- Elevation: 387 m (1,270 ft)

Population (2020)
  - Total: 52,360
  - Density: 36.8/km^{2} (95/sq mi)
- Time zone: UTC−3 (BRT)
- Postal code: 77600-000

Paraíso do Tocantins is a municipality in the state of Tocantins in the Northern region of Brazil. Situated within the intermediate geographic region of Palmas and the immediate geographic region of Paraíso do Tocantins, it is the fifth-largest city in the state with 52,360 inhabitants.

Noted as one of the "happiest cities in Brazil," Paraíso do Tocantins is also one of the main agricultural hubs of the Araguaia Valley. The main economic sectors in the city are commerce and services, which make up 46.42% of the local GDP. Paraíso do Tocantins sits at the intersection of the BR-153, also known as the Transbrasiliana, and the TO-080, which connects to Palmas 39 miles away.

The symbol of Paraíso do Tocantins is the yellow ipê—a native tree of the Cerrado biome. The main tourist attraction is the Serra do Estrondo, which is federally designated as an environmental protection area. The site features a lookout point with panoramic views of the city, a chapel, an outdoor gym, a walking trail, a kiosk, and a community center.

The municipality is also an important hub of agribusiness in the region, serving as a benchmark in both agriculture—particularly in the cultivation of soybeans, sugarcane, and corn—and livestock farming, where cattle raising is a prominent feature. Consequently, the municipality hosts meatpacking plants, distribution centers, and agro-industries, as well as dealerships for machinery and implements, and retail outlets that provide support to the sector.

== History ==
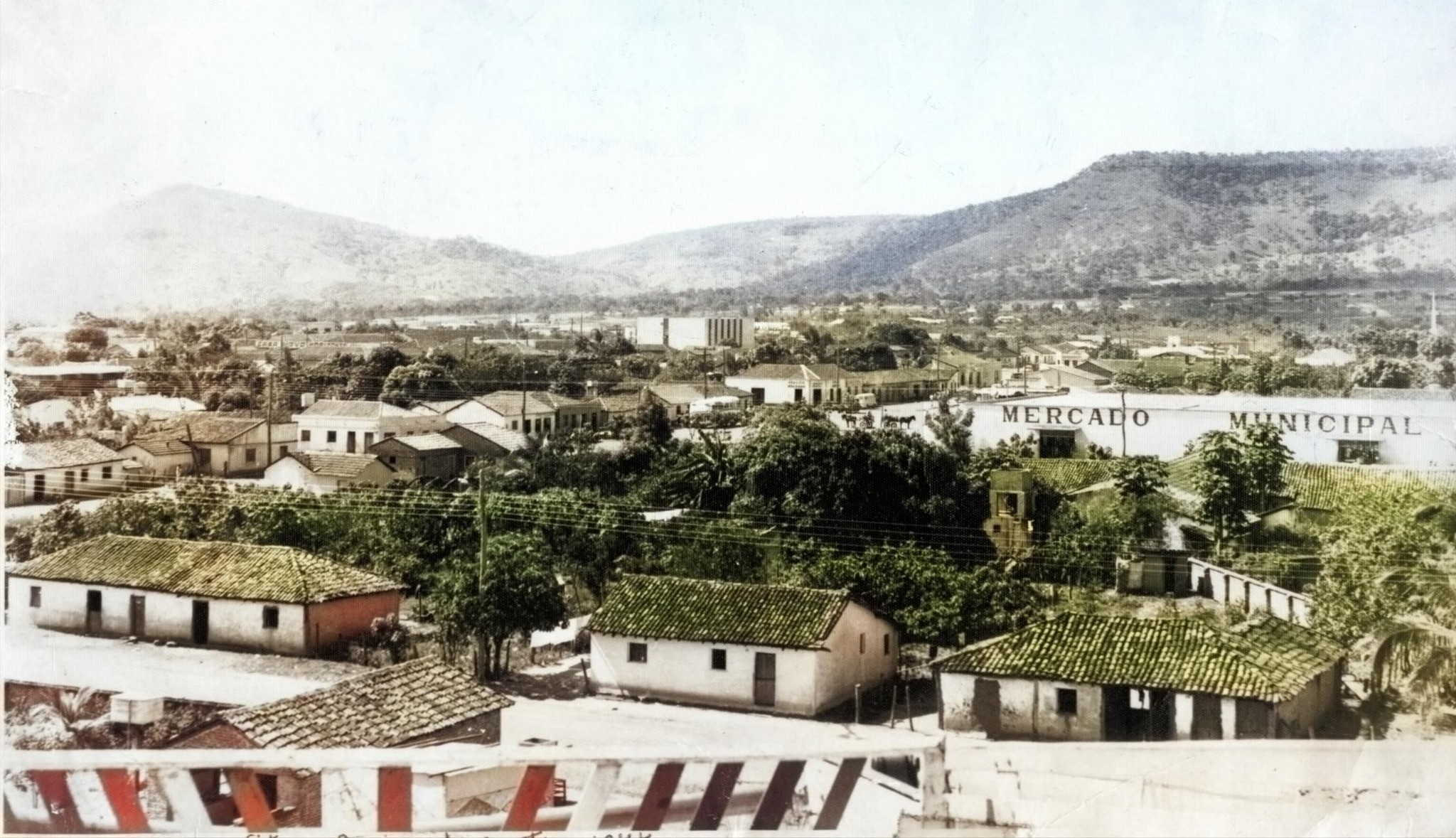
Center of Paraíso do Tocantins in 1977.

Paraíso do Tocantins came into existence with the emergence of a settlement along the roadside of the BR-14 (currently BR-153). This settlement originated from a workers' camp established during the construction of the highway under the supervision of the contractor Companhia Nacional. José Ribeiro Torres, who arrived at the site in 1958, is considered the founder of the settlement.

The name Paraíso was coined by Luzia de Melo Balthazar, the wife of Adjúlio Balthazar, who was the manager of the Companhia Nacional. She was reportedly enchanted by the natural beauty of the workers' camp, nestled in the cerrado at the base of Serra do Estrondo mountain range and bordered by the crystal-clear waters of the Pernada and Buritis streams.

Paraíso's municipal emancipation took place a few years later, with State Law No. 4,716, dated October 23, 1963. On that occasion, the new municipality received the toponym Paraíso do Norte, having been separated from the municipality of Pium.

With the creation and establishment of the State of Tocantins, the Legislative Decree No. 001, dated January 1, 1989, changed the name from Paraíso do Norte to Paraíso do Tocantins.

== Geography ==
Paraíso do Tocantins covers an area of 1,292.267 km², making it the 1,145th largest municipality in the country, the 72nd in the state, and the ninth in its immediate geographic region.

=== Population ===
According to the 2022 Census, the population of Paraíso do Tocantins consists of 52,360 people, with a population density of 40.5 inhabitants per km². The municipality is the 617th most populous in Brazil, the fifth in the state, and the first in its immediate region.

The Brazilian Institute of Geography and Statistics estimates that the municipality's had a population of 55,164 people in 2024.

=== Climate ===
Paraíso do Tocantins has a tropical savannah climate (Aw) on the Köppen Climate Classification System, characterized by hot temperatures year-round with defined wet and dry seasons.

==== Precipitation ====
Paraíso do Tocantins has an annual rainfall regime with accumulated totals ranging between 1,792 mm and 1,920 mm, with the highest monthly values recorded in March (between 280 and 320 mm). The rainy season lasts an average of 175 days, typically occurring between November and April.

==== Temperatures ====
The average temperature in Paraíso do Tocantins is 24°C. The average minimum temperature is 18°C at the highest elevations and 20°C at the lowest points of the territory. Minimum temperatures are typically recorded during the months of June, July, and August. The annual maximum temperature ranges between 30°C and 33°C. These values are typically recorded in the month of September.

== See also ==
- List of municipalities in Tocantins
