= Tocantinópolis Esporte Clube =

Brazilian association football club based in Tocantinópolis, Tocantins, Brazil

Tocantinópolis
- Full name: Tocantinópolis Esporte Clube
- Nicknames: Verdão do Norte (Northern Big Green); Verdão do Bico (Beak Big Green)
- Founded: 1 January 1989; 37 years ago
- Ground: Ribeirão
- Capacity: 8,000
- President: Wagner Novaes
- Head coach: Jairo Nascimento
- League: Campeonato Brasileiro Série D Campeonato Tocantinense
- 2025 2025: Série D, 48th of 64; Tocantinense, 1st or 2nd of 8
Home colors	Away colors	Third colors

Tocantinópolis Esporte Clube, commonly referred to as Tocantinópolis, is a Brazilian professional club based in Tocantinópolis, Tocantins founded on 1 January 1989. It competes in the Campeonato Brasileiro Série D, the fourth tier of Brazilian football, as well as in the Campeonato Tocantinense, the top flight of the Tocantins state football league.

Tocantinópolis is the second-best ranked team from Tocantins in CBF's national club ranking, being placed 146th overall.

== History ==
The club was founded on 1 January 1989. They competed for the first time in the Série C in 1997, when they were eliminated in the Second Stage of the competition. The club won the Campeonato Tocantinense in 1993 and in 2002. They competed once in the Série A in 2000, the competition was named Copa João Havelange at the time, and they reached the Second Stage of the Copa João Havelange Group Green and White. The club competed again the Série C in 2002, when they were eliminated in the Second Stage by Nacional. They competed in the Copa do Brasil in 2003, when they were eliminated in the First Round by Vitória. Tocantinópolis was eliminated in the First Stage in the 2005 by Remo.

== Stadium ==
Tocantinópolis play their home games at Ribeirão. The stadium has a maximum capacity of 8,000 people.

== Honours ==
- Campeonato Tocantinense
  - Winners (7): 1990, 1993, 2002, 2015, 2021, 2022, 2023
  - Runners-up (9): 1999, 2001, 2006, 2012, 2014, 2019, 2020, 2024, 2025
