= Campeonato Tocantinense =

Football league in Tocantins, Brazil

- Organising body: FTF
- Founded: 1989; 37 years ago (as an amateur Campeonato Tocantinense); 1993; 33 years ago (as the professional Campeonato Tocantinense)
- Country: Brazil
- State: Tocantins
- Level on pyramid: 1
- Relegation to: Tocantinense 2nd Division
- Domestic cup(s): Copa Verde; Copa do Brasil
- Current champions: Tocantinópolis (8th title) (2026)
- Most championships: Palmas; Tocantinópolis (8 titles each)
- Website: FTF Official website

The Campeonato Tocantinense is the top-flight professional state football league in the Brazilian state of Tocantins. It is run by the Tocantins Football Federation (FTF).

== History ==
The Tocantins Football Federation (FTF) was established on April 7, 1990 with the organization of clubs and leagues from the former northern region of Goiás and the sponsorship and execution of the first Tocantins State Amateur Football Championship (Copa Tocantins).

In 1993, the FTF presented its achievements from its two years of existence to the Brazilian Football Confederation (CBF) and proposed the professionalization of football in the state. The proposal was approved, allowing Tocantins teams to participate in national competitions organized by the CBF.

That same year, the FTF achieved several milestones, including the organization of the first professional football championship in Tocantins and the inclusion of Tocantins matches in the Brazilian sports lottery, such as the game between União Araguainense and Tocantins de Miracema.

== List of champions ==
Following is the list with the Campeonato Tocantinense champions:

=== Amateur era ===
Season	Champions
1989	Kaburé (1)
1990	Tocantinópolis (1)
1991	Kaburé (2)
1992	Intercap (1)

=== Professional era ===
Season	Champions	Runners-up
1993	Tocantinópolis (2)	Intercap
1994	União Araguainense (1)	Tocantins de Miracema
1995	Intercap (2)	Gurupi
1996	Gurupi (1)	Kaburé
1997	Gurupi (2)	Interporto
1998	Alvorada (1)	Palmas
1999	Interporto (1)	Tocantinópolis
2000	Palmas (1)	Interporto
2001	Palmas (2)	Tocantinópolis
2002	Tocantinópolis (3)	Palmas
2003	Palmas (3)	Gurupi
2004	Palmas (4)	Araguaína
2005	Colinas (1)	Araguaína
2006	Araguaína (1)	Tocantinópolis
2007	Palmas (5)	Araguaína
2008	Tocantins de Palmas (1)	Gurupi
2009	Araguaína (2)	Palmas
2010	Gurupi (3)	Araguaína
2011	Gurupi (4)	Interporto
2012	Gurupi (5)	Tocantinópolis
2013	Interporto (2)	Gurupi
2014	Interporto (3)	Tocantinópolis
2015	Tocantinópolis (4)	Interporto
2016	Gurupi (6)	Tocantins de Miracema
2017	Interporto (4)	Sparta
2018	Palmas (6)	Gurupi
2019	Palmas (7)	Tocantinópolis
2020	Palmas (8)	Tocantinópolis
2021	Tocantinópolis (5)	Araguacema
2022	Tocantinópolis (6)	Interporto
2023	Tocantinópolis (7)	Capital
2024	União AC (2)	Tocantinópolis
2025	Araguaína (3)	Tocantinópolis
2026	Tocantinópolis (8)	União AC

Names change

- Intercap is the currently Paraíso EC.
- União Araguainense and União Carmolandense is the currently União Atlético Clube.

Note

- Originally the 2025 state champion, União AC was punished by the STJD (Brazilian Superior Court of Sports Justice) in September 2025 with a points deduction due to the irregular use of the player Sheik (Geykson Lopes Pereira), resulting in the annulment of the final phase of the tournament. In December, a new playoff phase was held, with Araguaína FR becoming the champion.

== Titles by team ==
Teams in bold stills active.

Rank	Club	Winners	Winning years
1	**Palmas**	8	2000, 2001, 2003, 2004, 2007, 2018, 2019, 2020
1	**Tocantinópolis**	8	1990, 1993, 2002, 2015, 2021, 2022, 2023, 2026
3	**Gurupi**	6	1996, 1997, 2010, 2011, 2012, 2016
4	**Interporto**	4	1999, 2013, 2014, 2017
5	**Araguaína**	3	2006, 2009, 2025
6	Kaburé	2	1989, 1991
6	**Paraíso**	2	1992, 1995
6	**União AC**	2	1994, 2024
9	**Alvorada**	1	1998
9	Colinas	1	2005
9	Tocantins de Palmas	1	2008

=== By city ===
City	Championships	Clubs
Palmas	9	Palmas (8), Tocantins de Palmas (1)
Tocantinópolis	7	Tocantinópolis (7)
Gurupi	6	Gurupi (6)
Araguaína	5	Araguaína (3), União AC (2)
Porto Nacional	4	Interporto (4)
Colinas do Tocantins	3	Kaburé (2), Colinas (1)
Paraíso do Tocantins	2	Paraíso (2)
Alvorada	1	Alvorada (1)
