= Araguaína Futebol e Regatas =

Araguaína
- Full name: Araguaína Futebol e Regatas
- Nickname: Tourão do Norte (The Big Bull of the North)
- Founded: 28 February 1997; 29 years ago
- Ground: Municipal de Araguaína
- Capacity: 3,000
- President: Jorge Frederico
- Head coach: Alex Oliveira
- League: Campeonato Brasileiro Série D Campeonato Tocantinense
- 2025: Tocantinense, 1st or 2nd of 8
| Home colours | Away colours |

Araguaína Futebol e Regatas, usually known simply as Araguaína, is a Brazilian football club from Araguaína, Tocantins state. The club plays its home matches at Municipal de Araguaína. Araguaína competed in the Campeonato Brasileiro Série C in 2007, and won the Campeonato Tocantinense in 2006.

== History ==
The club was founded on February 28, 1997, after Araguaína Esporte Clube folded in 1996. In 2006, the club won the state championship for the first time, beating Tocantinópolis in the final. In 2007, Araguaína competed in the Campeonato Brasileiro Série C for the first time, but was eliminated in the first stage, after being punished with the loss of 12 points after fielding in two matches an ineligible player, named Eucimar da Silva Santos.

== Honours ==
- Campeonato Tocantinense
  - Winners (3): 2006, 2009, 2025
  - Runners-up (4): 2004, 2005, 2007, 2010
- Campeonato Tocantinense Second Division
  - Winners (2): 2012, 2017

== Stadium ==
Araguaína's home stadium is Municipal de Araguaína, officially named Estádio Municipal George Yunes, with a maximum capacity of 3,000 people.
