= Palmas Futebol e Regatas =

Brazilian association football club based in Palmas, Tocantins

Palmas
- Full name: Palmas Futebol e Regatas
- Nickname: Tricolor (Threecolour)
- Founded: 31 January 1997; 28 years ago
- Ground: Estádio Nilton Santos
- Capacity: 10,000
- President: Fábio Fonseca
- Head coach: Jairo Nascimento
- League: Campeonato Tocantinense
- 2025: Tocantinense Segunda Divisão, 1st of 10 (champions)
Home colors	Away colors

Palmas Futebol e Regatas, commonly referred to as Palmas, is a Brazilian professional club based in Palmas, Tocantins, founded on 31 January 1997. It competes in the Campeonato Tocantinense, the top flight of the Tocantins state football league.

== History ==
Palmas Futebol e Regatas was founded on January 31, 1997, after borrowing Canelas documentation, which was already regularized at Tocantins Football Federation, thus, becoming the first professional club of the city. Tocantins Governor Siqueira Campos was the first person to sign the club's foundation minute.

On March 30, 1997, at Estádio General Sampaio, Porto Nacional, Belziran José de Souza scored the club's first goal. However, Palmas was beaten by Interporto 2–1.

In 1997, Palmas competed in the Campeonato Brasileiro Série C for the first time. The club was eliminated in the first stage.

On February 21, 2001, Palmas played its 100th match, against Gama, at Estádio Mané Garrincha, Brasília. Gama beat Palmas 1–0.

In 2004, the club was eliminated in Copa do Brasil quarterfinals, by 15 de Novembro. That was the club's best participation in the competition.

On January 24, 2021, Palmas' special plane crashed on the way to Goiânia, killing the president of the club Lucas Meira, four footballers and the pilot.

On January 26, 2023, Palmas announced its withdrawal from the 2023 Tocantinense Football Championship. The club issued a statement informing that "due to reasons beyond sports, it will not be able to participate in the 2023 Tocantinense. The club had to pay a fine of 20 thousand reais, in addition to being banned from playing competitions until 2025, licensing itself from professional football.

In April 2025, Palmas was bought by a Football Anonymous Society (in portuguese, Sociedade Anônima do Futebol, or SAF) led by Fabio Fonseca, where, in the same month, the club's return to the Under-20 Tocantinense was announced and right away in the second division of Tocantins, where they won the unprecedented title after beating, in the finals, SC Guaraí 3-1 away from home in the second leg; the first leg, in Palmas, ended in a 1-1 draw.

== Stadium ==
Palmas' home stadium is Estádio Nilton Santos, inaugurated in 2000, with a maximum capacity of 12,000 people.

== Mascot ==
Palmas' mascot is a hyacinth macaw (Anodorhynchus hyacinthinus), wearing the club's away kit.

== Club colors ==
The club colors are blue and white.

== Honours ==
=== State ===
- Campeonato Tocantinense
  - Winners (8): 2000, 2001, 2003, 2004, 2007, 2018, 2019, 2020
  - Runners-up (3): 1998, 2002, 2009
- Campeonato Tocantinense Second Division
  - Winners (1): 2025

=== Women's Football ===
- Campeonato Tocantinense de Futebol Feminino
  - Winners (1): 1999
