= Interporto Futebol Clube =

Brazilian association football club based in Porto Nacional, Tocantins, Brazil

Interporto
- Full name: Interporto Futebol Clube
- Nickname: Tigre (Tiger)
- Founded: 13 July 1990; 35 years ago
- Ground: Estádio General Sampaio
- Capacity: 2,000
- President: Werberson Tita
- Head coach: Wladimir Ferreira
- League: Campeonato Tocantinense Segunda Divisão
- 2025: Tocantinense Segunda Divisão, 7th of 10
- Website: https://www.interportofc.com.br/
Home colors	Away colors	Third colors

Interporto Futebol Clube, or Interporto, as they are usually called, is a Brazilian football team from Porto Nacional in Tocantins, founded on 13 July 1990.

Interporto is currently ranked third among Tocantins teams in CBF's national club ranking, at 147th place overall.

== History ==
The club was founded on June 13, 1990. Interporto won the Copa Tocantins in 1998, the Campeonato Tocantinense in 1999, and the Campeonato Tocantinense Second Level in 2009. They competed in the Copa do Brasil for the first time in 1999, when they were eliminated in the First Round by Gama, and in 2000, when they were eliminated in the First Round by Bahia.

== Honours ==
- Campeonato Tocantinense
  - Winners (4): 1999, 2013, 2014, 2017
  - Runners-up (5): 1997, 2000, 2011, 2015, 2022
- Copa Tocantins
  - Winners (1): 1998
- Campeonato Tocantinense Second Division
  - Winners (1): 2009

== Stadium ==
Interporto Futebol Clube play their home games at Estádio General Sampaio. The stadium has a maximum capacity of 2,000 people.
