= Gurupi Esporte Clube =

Gurupi
- Full name: Gurupi Esporte Clube
- Nickname: Camaleão do Sul
- Founded: September 15, 1988
- Ground: Estádio Gilberto Resende, Gurupi
- Capacity: 3,000
- President: Wilson de Souza Castilho
- Head coach: Wladimir Araújo
- League: Campeonato Tocantinense
- 2025: Tocantinense, 4th of 8
Home colors	Away colors

Gurupi Esporte Clube, commonly known as Gurupi, is a Brazilian football club based in Gurupi, Tocantins state. They competed three times in the Série C.

Gurupi is currently ranked fourth among Tocantins teams in CBF's national club ranking, at 204th place overall.

== History ==
The club was founded on September 15, 1988. They competed in the Série C in 1995, 1996 and in 2004. Gurupi won the Campeonato Tocantinense in 1996, 1997 and in 2010, when they defeated Araguaína in the final. The club won the Campeonato Tocantinense in 2011, and was invited to compete in the 2011 Série D, but they chose to not compete. Gurupi won the state championship again in 2012 and in 2016.

== Honours ==
=== State ===
- Campeonato Tocantinense
  - Winners (6): 1996, 1997, 2010, 2011, 2012, 2016
  - Runners-up (6): 1993, 1995, 2003, 2008, 2013, 2018
- Campeonato Tocantinense Second Division
  - Winners (2): 2020, 2022

=== Women's Football ===
- Campeonato Tocantinense de Futebol Feminino
  - Winners (1): 1993

== Stadium ==
Gurupi Esporte Clube play their home games at Estádio Gilberto Resende, commonly known as Resendão. The stadium has a maximum capacity of 3,000 people.
