= 1995 Campeonato Brasileiro Série B =

Campeonato Brasileiro Série B
- Season: 1995
- Champions: Atlético-PR
- Promoted: Atlético-PR; Coritiba
- Relegated: Ponte Preta; Democrata
- Top goalscorer: Oséas (Atlético-PR) - 14 goals
- Biggest home win: Coritiba 8-0 Ferroviária (August 16, 1995)
- Biggest away win: Democrata 0-4 Central (August 27, 1995)

The football (soccer) Campeonato Brasileiro Série B 1995, the second level of Brazilian National League, was held from August 13 to December 16, 1995. The competition had 24 clubs and two of them were promoted to Série A and two were relegated to Série C. The competition was won by Atlético-PR.

Atlético-PR finished the final phase group with the most points, and was declared 1995 Brazilian Série B champions, claiming the promotion to the 1996 Série A along with Coritiba, the runners-up. The two worst ranked teams (Ponte Preta and Democrata) were originally relegated to play Série C in 1996. However, after Barra do Garças withdrew from the competition in 1996, Ponte Preta's relegation was cancelled.

== Teams ==
Team	City	Stadium	1994 Season
América-RN	Natal	Machadão	5th in Série B
América-SP	São José do Rio Preto	Teixeirão	19th in Série B
Americano	Campos dos Goytacazes	Godofredo Cruz	4th in Série B
Atlético-PR	Curitiba	Arena da Baixada	6th in Série B
Bangu	Rio de Janeiro	Moça Bonita	21st in Série B
Barra do Garças	Barra do Garças	Zeca Costa	20th in Série B
Ceará	Fortaleza	Castelão	10th in Série B
Central	Caruaru	Lacerdão	17th in Série B
Coritiba	Curitiba	Couto Pereira	14th in Série B
CRB	Maceió	Pajuçara	22nd in Série B
Democrata	Governador Valadares	Mamudão	18th in Série B
Desportiva	Cariacica	Engenheiro Araripe	3rd in Série B
Ferroviária	Araraquara	Fonte Luminosa	2nd in Série C
Goiatuba	Goiatuba	Divino Garcia Rosa	15th in Série B
Londrina	Londrina	Café	11th in Série B
Mogi Mirim	Mogi Mirim	Wilson Fernandes de Barros	7th in Série B
Moto Club	São Luís	Castelão	12th in Série B
Náutico	Recife	Aflitos	24th in Série A
Novorizontino	Novo Horizonte	Jorjão	1st in Série C
Ponte Preta	Campinas	Moisés Lucarelli	9th in Série B
Remo	Belém	Mangueirão	23rd in Série A
Santa Cruz	Recife	Arruda	16th in Série B
Tuna Luso	Belém	Francisco Vasques	13th in Série B
Sergipe	Aracaju	João Hora	8th in Série B

== First phase ==
=== Group A ===
Pos	Team	Pld	W	D	L	GF	GA	GD	Pts	Qualification	CEA	TUN	REM	ARN	MOT	NAU
1	Ceará	10	3	7	0	6	3	+3	16	Qualified to the second phase		2–1	2–2	0–0	0–0	0–0
2	(Pará) Tuna Luso	10	4	2	4	11	10	+1	14	Qualified to the second phase	0–0		2–0	0–0	3–0	1–0
3	(Pará) Remo	10	3	4	3	11	11	0	13	Qualified to the second phase	0–0	0–2		4–0	2–1	2–2
4	(Rio Grande do Norte) América-RN	10	3	3	4	8	10	−2	12	Qualified to the second phase	0–1	2–1	2–0		2–0	0–0
5	(Maranhão) Moto Club	10	3	3	4	7	9	−2	12		0–0	3–1	0–1	1–0		2–0
6	(Pernambuco) Náutico	10	2	5	3	8	8	0	11		0–1	3–0	0–0	3–2	0–0	

=== Group B ===
Pos	Team	Pld	W	D	L	GF	GA	GD	Pts	Qualification or relegation	SAN	SER	DES	CEN	CRB	DEM
1	(Pernambuco) Santa Cruz	10	5	3	2	17	7	+10	18	Qualified to the second phase		2–0	1–2	1–0	6–0	2–2
2	Sergipe	10	5	2	3	10	9	+1	17	Qualified to the second phase	0–1		1–1	1–0	2–1	1–0
3	(Espírito Santo) Desportiva	10	4	5	1	10	7	+3	17	Qualified to the second phase	1–1	2–1		0–0	0–0	1–0
4	(Pernambuco) Central	10	4	3	3	10	5	+5	15	Qualified to the second phase	0–0	1–1	1–0		2–0	1–0
5	(Alagoas) CRB	10	2	3	5	11	20	−9	9		1–3	1–2	1–1	2–1		4–2
6	(Minas Gerais) Democrata	10	1	2	7	7	17	−10	5	Relegated to 1996 Série C	1–0	0–1	1–2	0–4	1–1	

=== Group C ===
Pos	Team	Pld	W	D	L	GF	GA	GD	Pts	Qualification	ATL	GOI	AME	NOV	ASP	BAR
1	(Paraná (state)) Atlético-PR	10	7	2	1	17	7	+10	23	Qualified to the Second phase		2–0	2–0	2–0	2–1	3–0
2	(Goiás) Goiatuba	10	4	2	4	12	13	−1	14	Qualified to the Second phase	2–0		3–0	0–1	1–1	2–1
3	(Rio de Janeiro (state)) Americano	10	4	2	4	8	9	−1	14	Qualified to the Second phase	0–0	2–0		0–1	1–0	2–0
4	(São Paulo (state)) Novorizontino	10	4	1	5	11	11	0	14	Qualified to the Second phase	1–2	2–3	2–0		2–2	2–0
5	(São Paulo (state)) América-SP	10	2	5	3	10	9	+1	11		0–0	4–1	0–0	1–0		1–1
6	(Mato Grosso) Barra do Garças	10	2	2	6	8	17	−9	8		3–4	0–0	1–3	1–0	1–0	

=== Group D ===
Pos	Team	Pld	W	D	L	GF	GA	GD	Pts	Qualification or relegation	COR	MOG	LON	BAN	FER	PON
1	(Paraná (state)) Coritiba	10	6	3	1	17	5	+12	21	Qualified to the Second phase		1–0	1–0	2–0	8–0	2–1
2	(São Paulo (state)) Mogi Mirim	10	6	2	2	11	5	+6	20	Qualified to the Second phase	2–0		0–0	1–0	3–0	2–1
3	(Paraná (state)) Londrina	10	3	5	2	14	6	+8	14	Qualified to the Second phase	1–1	1–1		5–0	3–1	3–0
4	(Rio de Janeiro (state)) Bangu	10	4	1	5	6	11	−5	13	Qualified to the Second phase	0–0	0–1	1–0		1–0	2–0
5	(São Paulo (state)) Ferroviária	10	2	3	5	4	16	−12	9		0–0	0–1	0–0	1–0		0–0
6	(São Paulo (state)) Ponte Preta	10	1	2	7	6	15	−9	5	Relegated to 1996 Série C	1–2	0–1	3–0	1–2	1–0	

== Second phase ==
=== Group E ===
Pos	Team	Pld	W	D	L	GF	GA	GD	Pts	Qualification	SER	CEA	DES	ARN
1	Sergipe	6	3	2	1	9	9	0	11	Qualified to the Third phase		2–0	3–3	1–0
2	Ceará	6	3	1	2	11	5	+6	10	Qualified to the Third phase	4–0		5–1	2–1
3	Desportiva	6	2	3	1	13	10	+3	9		2–2	0–0		5–0
4	América-RN	6	1	0	5	2	11	−9	3		0–1	1–0	0–2	

=== Group F ===
Pos	Team	Pld	W	D	L	GF	GA	GD	Pts	Qualification	REM	CEN	SAN	TUN
1	Remo	6	4	1	1	9	7	+2	13	Qualified to the Third phase		2–1	2–1	3–2
2	Central	6	2	2	2	8	7	+1	8	Qualified to the Third phase	0–0		2–1	3–1
3	Santa Cruz	6	2	2	2	6	5	+1	8		2–0	0–0		1–0
4	Tuna Luso	6	1	1	4	8	12	−4	4		1–2	3–2	1–1	

=== Group G ===
Pos	Team	Pld	W	D	L	GF	GA	GD	Pts	Qualification	ATL	MOG	LON	NOV
1	Atlético-PR	6	4	1	1	13	5	+8	13	Qualified to the Third phase		6–0	1–1	1–0
2	Mogi Mirim	6	4	1	1	7	9	−2	13	Qualified to the Third phase	1–0		2–1	2–1
3	Londrina	6	1	2	3	4	6	−2	5		1–2	0–1		1–0
4	Novorizontino	6	0	2	4	4	8	−4	2		2–3	1–1	0–0	

=== Group H ===
Pos	Team	Pld	W	D	L	GF	GA	GD	Pts	Qualification	COR	BAN	GOI	AME
1	Coritiba	6	4	2	0	9	3	+6	14	Qualified to the Third phase		2–0	3–1	1–0
2	Bangu	6	2	1	3	6	9	−3	7	Qualified to the Third phase	1–2		0–3	0–0
3	Goiatuba	6	2	1	3	10	14	−4	7		0–0	2–4		3–2
4	Americano	6	1	2	3	8	7	+1	5		1–1	0–1	5–1	

== Third phase ==
=== Group I ===
Pos	Team	Pld	W	D	L	GF	GA	GD	Pts	Qualification	ATL	CEN	BAN	SER
1	Atlético-PR	6	5	1	0	9	3	+6	16	Qualified to the Final phase		2–0	1–0	2–1
2	Central	6	2	2	2	7	6	+1	8	Qualified to the Final phase	1–2		0–0	2–0
3	Bangu	6	1	3	2	6	6	0	6		0–0	2–2		3–1
4	Sergipe	6	0	2	4	4	11	−7	2		1–1	0–2	1–1	

=== Group J ===
Pos	Team	Pld	W	D	L	GF	GA	GD	Pts	Qualification	MOG	COR	REM	CEA
1	Mogi Mirim	6	3	3	0	5	1	+4	12	Qualified to the Final phase		1–0	2–0	1–0
2	Coritiba	6	2	3	1	6	3	+3	9	Qualified to the Final phase	0–0		2–0	1–1
3	Remo	6	2	2	2	7	6	+1	8		0–0	1–1		4–1
4	Ceará	6	0	2	4	3	11	−8	2		1–1	0–2	0–2	

== Final phase ==
Pos	Team	Pld	W	D	L	GF	GA	GD	Pts	Qualification	ATL	COR	MOG	CEN
1	Atlético-PR	6	4	1	1	8	5	+3	13	Promoted to 1996 Série A		1–1	1–0	4–1
2	Coritiba	6	3	2	1	15	6	+9	11	Promoted to 1996 Série A	3–0		5–0	4–2
3	Mogi Mirim	6	2	1	3	8	9	−1	7		0–1	1–1		3–0
4	Central	6	1	0	5	6	17	−11	3		0–1	2–1	1–4	

== Sources ==
- "Brazil Second Level 1995". rsssf.com.
