= 1995 Campeonato Carioca =

Campeonato Carioca
- Season: 1995
- Champions: Fluminense
- Relegated: Entrerriense; São Cristóvão; Friburguense; Campo Grande
- Copa do Brasil: Flamengo; Fluminense; Botafogo; Vasco da Gama
- Série C: América; Barra; Bayer; Campo Grande; Itaperuna; Volta Redonda
- Matches played: 182
- Goals scored: 447 (2.46 per match)
- Top goalscorer: Túlio (Botafogo) - 27 goals
- Biggest home win: Botafogo 7-0 São Cristóvão (March 8, 1995)
- Biggest away win: Friburguense 0-6 Flamengo (February 5, 1995)
- Highest scoring: Campo Grande 2-6 Bangu (February 1, 1995)

The 1995 edition of the Campeonato Carioca kicked off on January 28, 1995 and ended on June 25, 1995. It is the official tournament organized by FFERJ (Federação de Futebol do Estado do Rio de Janeiro, or Rio de Janeiro State Football Federation. Only clubs based in the Rio de Janeiro State are allowed to play. Sixteen teams contested this edition. Fluminense won the title for the 28th time. Entrerriense, São Cristóvão, Friburguense and Campo Grande were relegated.

== System ==
The tournament would be divided in four stages:

- Taça Guanabara: The sixteen teams were divided into two groups of eight. the teams all played in double round-robin format against the teams of their own group. The four best teams in each group qualified to the Second phase. However, the qualified team with the worst performance would dispute a playoff against the winner of the Módulo Intermediário's playoffs. The teams with the most points in each group went to the finals of the Taça Guanabara. Bonus points were given for the top team in each group's first and second half, and the winner of the Taça Guanabara.
- Módulo Intermediário: The equivalent of the Second Level: The eighteen teams were divided into two groups; one with eight and other with ten, with the teams all played in double round-robin format against the teams of their own group. The two best teams of Group A would be promoted to the First Level for 1996. However, the winner of Group A would dispute a playoff against the winner of Group B for a berth on the playoff against the Taça Guanabara's worst qualified team.
- Relegation Playoff: The bottom two teams of each group in the Taça Guanabara would dispute that phase. played in a double round-robin format against each other. the two teams with the fewest points were relegated.
- Second phase: The remaining eight teams all played in a double round-robin format against each other. the team with the most points was champion.

== Championship ==
=== Taça Guanabara ===
==== Group A ====
Pos	Team	Pld	W	D	L	GF	GA	GD	Pts	Qualification or relegation
1	Botafogo	14	10	3	1	37	8	+29	33	Qualified to Finals
2	Vasco da Gama	14	9	4	1	29	11	+18	31	Qualified
3	América	14	5	6	3	23	16	+7	21	Qualified
4	Entrerriense	14	6	3	5	18	25	−7	21	Playoffs
5	Itaperuna	14	4	5	5	11	11	0	17	
6	Barreira	14	2	7	5	13	21	−8	13	
7	Olaria	14	3	2	9	15	34	−19	11	Relegation Tournament
8	São Cristóvão	14	0	4	10	13	33	−20	4	Relegation Tournament

Updated to match(es) played on March 20, 1995. Source: RSSSF.com
Rules for classification: 1) points; 2) goal difference; 3) wins; 4) number of goals scored.

==== Group B ====
Pos	Team	Pld	W	D	L	GF	GA	GD	Pts	Qualification or relegation
1	Flamengo	14	9	4	1	34	12	+22	31	Qualified to Finals
2	Fluminense	14	8	4	2	24	9	+15	28	Qualified
3	Volta Redonda	14	7	2	5	17	15	+2	23	Qualified
4	Bangu	14	5	7	2	20	14	+6	22	Qualified
5	Madureira	14	5	5	4	13	14	−1	20	
6	Friburguense	14	2	4	8	9	24	−15	10	
7	Americano	14	1	6	7	5	16	−11	9	Relegation Tournament
8	Campo Grande	14	1	4	9	7	25	−18	7	Relegation Tournament

Updated to match(es) played on March 20, 1995. Source: RSSSF.com
Rules for classification: 1) points; 2) goal difference; 3) wins; 4) number of goals scored.

==== Finals ====
Team 1	Score	Team 2
Flamengo	3–2	Botafogo

=== Módulo Intermediário ===
==== Group C ====
Pos	Team	Pld	W	D	L	GF	GA	GD	Pts	Qualification or relegation
1	Barra Mansa	14	8	3	3	15	8	+7	27	Qualified
2	Bayer	14	7	5	2	14	5	+9	26	
3	Bonsucesso	14	7	5	2	19	12	+7	26	
4	Nova Iguaçu	14	6	6	2	17	9	+8	24	
5	Portuguesa	14	4	5	5	19	11	+8	17	
6	Goytacaz	14	3	5	6	10	15	−5	14	
7	Mesquita	14	2	3	9	7	22	−15	9	
8	Saquarema	14	1	4	9	11	30	−19	7	

Updated to match(es) played on March 16, 1995. Source: Brfut.blogspot.com
Rules for classification: 1) points; 2) wins; 3) goal difference; 4) number of goals scored.

==== Group D ====
Pos	Team	Pld	W	D	L	GF	GA	GD	Pts	Qualification or relegation
1	Barra	18	10	4	4	24	14	+10	34	Qualified
2	América de Três Rios	18	9	6	3	29	13	+16	33	
3	Italva	18	7	8	3	19	16	+3	29	
4	Serrano	18	7	6	5	16	15	+1	27	
5	Barra da Tijuca	18	6	7	5	24	18	+6	25	
6	Olympico	18	6	6	6	23	22	+1	24	
7	Rubro Social	18	5	6	7	23	27	−4	21	
8	Heliópolis	18	4	6	8	18	23	−5	18	
9	Canto do Rio	18	3	7	8	12	23	−11	16	
10	Everest	18	3	4	11	12	29	−17	13	

Updated to match(es) played on March 16, 1995. Source: Cacellain.com.br
Rules for classification: 1) points; 2) wins; 3) goal difference; 4) number of goals scored.

==== Finals ====
Team 1	Score	Team 2
Barra	1–0	Barra Mansa

=== Playoffs ===
Team 1	Score	Team 2
Entrerriense	3–2	Barra

=== Relegation group ===
Originally, Campo Grande and São Cristóvão were relegated, to be replaced by Barra Mansa and Bayer. However, for 1996, the federation decided to reduce the championship to twelve teams and, in addition to not promoting any team from the Módulo Intermediário, inexplicably relegated Entrerriense (8th place) and Friburguense (12th place).

Pos	Team	Pld	W	D	L	GF	GA	GD	Pts	Qualification or relegation
1	Americano	6	4	0	2	13	9	+4	12	
2	Olaria	6	3	2	1	11	5	+6	11	
3	São Cristóvão	6	2	1	3	6	7	−1	7	Relegated
4	Campo Grande	6	1	1	4	6	15	−9	4	Relegated

Updated to match(es) played on April 30, 1995. Source: RSSSF.com
Rules for classification: 1) points; 2) goal difference; 3) wins; 4) number of goals scored.

=== Second phase ===
Pos	Team	Pld	W	D	L	GF	GA	GD	Pts	Qualification or relegation
1	Fluminense	14	10	3	1	25	10	+15	33	Champions
2	Flamengo	14	9	2	3	38	18	+20	32	
3	Botafogo	14	9	2	3	25	8	+17	30	
4	Vasco da Gama	14	5	6	3	21	12	+9	22	
5	América	14	3	3	8	11	19	−8	12	
6	Volta Redonda	14	3	3	8	12	31	−19	12	
7	Bangu	14	2	6	6	11	20	−9	12	
8	Entrerriense	14	1	3	10	6	31	−25	6	

Updated to match(es) played on June 25, 1995. Source: RSSSF.com
Rules for classification: 1) points; 2) goal difference; 3) wins; 4) number of goals scored.
