= 1994 Campeonato Brasileiro Série B =

Campeonato Brasileiro Série B
- Season: 1994
- Champions: Juventude
- Promoted: Juventude; Goiás
- Relegated: Fortaleza; Tiradentes-DF
- Goals: 419
- Average goals/game: 2,41
- Top goalscorer: Baltazar (Goiás); Mário (Juventude): 14 goals
- Biggest home win: Ceará 6-1 Tuna Luso (November 6, 1994)
- Biggest away win: Moto Club 0-4 América-RN (August 24, 1994); Fortaleza 1-5 Ceará (August 28, 1994)

The football (soccer) Campeonato Brasileiro Série B 1994, the second level of Brazilian National League, was played from August 7 to December 4, 1994. The competition had 24 clubs and two of them were promoted to Série A and two were relegated to Série C. The competition was won by Juventude.

The championship was reestablished after the 1993 Campeonato Brasileiro, and its participants included the eight teams relegated from the 1993 Série A, along with 16 teams chosen through qualificatory tournaments. However, with América-MG's suspension, Democrata, that had been eliminated in the qualification, was chosen to take América's place. Juventude beat Goiás in the final match, and was declared 1994 Brazilian Série B champions, and both Goiás and Juventude achieved promotion to the 1995 Série A. The two worst ranked teams (Fortaleza and Tiradentes-DF) were relegated to play Série C in 1995.

== Qualification ==
=== Southern Region ===
==== Rio Grande do Sul ====
Teams			Scores			
Team 1	Points	Team 2	1st leg	2nd leg	3rd leg	Agg.
Juventude	2:2	Brasil de Farroupilha	2:1	0:1	1:0	—

==== Santa Catarina ====
Pos	Team	Pld	W	D	L	GF	GA	GD	Pts	Qualification
1	Figueirense	4	2	2	0	8	7	+1	6	Qualified to the Southern triangular
2	Joinville	4	1	2	1	3	3	0	4	Eliminated
3	Marcílio Dias	4	1	1	2	5	6	−1	3	Eliminated

==== Paraná ====
Pos	Team	Pld	W	D	L	GF	GA	GD	Pts	Qualification
1	Londrina	6	3	3	0	7	1	+6	9	Qualified to the Southern triangular
2	Operário-PR	6	3	3	0	5	1	+4	9	Eliminated
3	União Bandeirante	6	1	1	4	2	6	−4	3	Eliminated
4	Matsubara	6	0	3	3	1	7	−6	3	Eliminated

=== Southern triangular ===
Pos	Team	Pld	W	D	L	GF	GA	GD	Pts	Qualification
1	(Paraná (state)) Londrina	4	3	1	0	9	1	+8	7	Qualified to 1994 Série B
2	(Rio Grande do Sul) Juventude	4	1	2	1	2	2	0	4	Qualified to 1994 Série B
3	(Santa Catarina (state)) Figueirense	4	0	1	3	2	10	−8	1	Eliminated

=== São Paulo ===
==== Group A ====
Pos	Team	Pld	W	D	L	GF	GA	GD	Pts	Qualification
1	América-SP	10	5	3	2	14	9	+5	13	Qualified to 1994 Série B
2	Novorizontino	10	6	0	4	16	12	+4	12	Eliminated
3	Noroeste	10	4	2	4	8	12	−4	10	Eliminated
4	Marília	10	3	4	3	8	11	−3	10	Eliminated
5	Botafogo-SP	10	3	3	4	16	13	+3	9	Eliminated
6	Ferroviária	10	2	2	6	6	11	−5	6	Eliminated

==== Group B ====
Pos	Team	Pld	W	D	L	GF	GA	GD	Pts	Qualification
1	Ponte Preta	10	6	3	1	16	9	+7	15	Qualified to 1994 Série B
2	Inter de Limeira	10	5	3	2	12	7	+5	13	Eliminated
3	São Caetano	10	3	4	3	10	14	−4	10	Eliminated
4	Juventus	10	2	6	2	16	10	+6	10	Eliminated
5	Sãocarlense	10	1	5	4	8	11	−3	7	Eliminated
6	Ituano	10	1	3	6	6	17	−11	5	Eliminated

=== Rio de Janeiro ===
Pos	Team	Pld	W	D	L	GF	GA	GD	Pts	Qualification
1	Bangu	6	2	4	0	8	2	+6	8	Qualified to 1994 Série B
2	Americano	4	2	1	1	4	4	0	5 (Note: Americano's results against Itaperuna are unknown.)	Qualified to 1994 Série B
3	América-RJ	6	2	1	3	5	8	−3	5	Eliminated
4	Itaperuna	4	0	2	2	1	5	−4	2	Eliminated

=== Goiás-Tocantins ===
Pos	Team	Pld	W	D	L	GF	GA	GD	Pts	Qualification
1	(Goiás) Goiatuba	6	3	2	1	8	4	+4	8	Qualified to 1994 Série B
2	(Goiás) Atlético-GO	6	3	1	2	9	8	+1	7	Eliminated
3	(Goiás) Vila Nova	6	1	3	2	11	8	+3	5	Eliminated
4	(Tocantins) Tocantinópolis	6	1	2	3	5	13	−8	4	Eliminated

=== Minas Gerais-Federal District ===
==== Minas Gerais ====
Pos	Team	Pld	W	D	L	GF	GA	GD	Pts	Qualification
1	Democrata-GV	4	2	2	0	6	2	+4	6	Qualified to the Minas Gerais-Federal District final
2	Valeriodoce	4	1	3	0	7	4	+3	5	Eliminated
3	Caldense	4	0	1	3	2	9	−7	1	Eliminated

==== Federal District ====
Pos	Team	Pld	W	D	L	GF	GA	GD	Pts	Qualification
1	Tiradentes-DF	6	3	2	1	7	5	+2	8	Qualified to the Minas Gerais-Federal District final
2	Taguatinga	6	2	3	1	7	6	+1	7	Eliminated
3	Gama	6	2	2	2	7	6	+1	6	Eliminated
4	Guará	6	0	3	3	1	5	−4	3	Eliminated

==== Final ====
Team 1	Agg.	Team 2	1st leg	2nd leg
Tiradentes-DF (Federal District (Brazil))	0-0(p)	(Minas Gerais) Democrata	0-0	0-0

=== Northern Region ===
==== Acre-Amazonas ====
Pos	Team	Pld	W	D	L	GF	GA	GD	Pts	Qualification
1	(Amazonas (Brazilian state)) Nacional	6	4	1	1	8	2	+6	9	Qualified to the Amazonas-Mato Grosso final
2	(Amazonas (Brazilian state)) Rio Negro	6	4	0	2	8	5	+3	8	Eliminated
3	(Acre (state)) Rio Branco	6	2	1	3	6	7	−1	5	Eliminated
4	(Acre (state)) Independência	6	0	2	4	1	9	−8	2	Eliminated

==== Mato Grosso-Rondônia ====
Pos	Team	Pld	W	D	L	GF	GA	GD	Pts	Qualification
1	(Mato Grosso) Barra do Garças	8	5	1	2	12	4	+8	11	Qualified to the Amazonas-Mato Grosso final
2	(Rondônia) Ariquemes	8	4	2	2	9	9	0	10	Eliminated
3	(Mato Grosso) Operário	8	3	3	2	12	6	+6	9	Eliminated
4	(Rondônia) Porto Velho	8	2	1	5	5	15	−10	5	Eliminated
5	(Rondônia) Ji-Paraná	8	1	3	4	4	8	−4	5	Eliminated

==== Final ====
Team 1	Score	Team 2
Barra do Garças	1-0	Nacional

=== Pará-Amapá ===
Pos	Team	Pld	W	D	L	GF	GA	GD	Pts	Qualification
1	(Pará) Tuna Luso	6	3	2	1	6	3	+3	8	Qualified to 1994 Série B
2	(Amapá) Ypiranga	6	2	3	1	8	6	+2	7	Eliminated
3	(Amapá) Macapá	6	3	0	3	7	7	0	6	Eliminated
4	(Pará) Bragantino	6	1	1	4	3	8	−5	3	Eliminated

=== Ceará-Rio Grande do Norte ===
Pos	Team	Pld	W	D	L	GF	GA	GD	Pts	Qualification
1	(Rio Grande do Norte) América-RN	8	4	3	1	12	8	+4	11	Qualified to 1994 Série B
2	(Rio Grande do Norte) Coríntians	8	4	3	1	7	4	+3	11	Eliminated
3	(Ceará) Icasa	8	2	3	3	8	10	−2	7	Eliminated
4	(Ceará) Ferroviário	8	1	4	3	9	11	−2	6	Eliminated
5	(Rio Grande do Norte) ABC	8	1	3	4	9	12	−3	5	Eliminated

=== Paraíba-Alagoas ===
Pos	Team	Pld	W	D	L	GF	GA	GD	Pts	Qualification
1	(Alagoas) CRB	8	4	2	2	12	7	+5	10	Qualified to 1994 Série B
2	(Paraíba) Treze	8	3	4	1	11	9	+2	10	Eliminated
3	(Paraíba) Botafogo-PB	8	2	4	2	11	10	+1	8	Eliminated
4	(Paraíba) Auto Esporte	8	1	5	2	6	9	−3	7	Eliminated
5	(Paraíba) Campinense	8	2	1	5	7	13	−6	5	Eliminated

=== Pernambuco ===
Pos	Team	Pld	W	D	L	GF	GA	GD	Pts	Qualification
1	(Pernambuco) Central	4	1	3	0	3	2	+1	5	Qualified to 1994 Série B
2	(Pernambuco) Paulistano	4	1	2	1	3	6	−3	4	Eliminated
3	(Pernambuco) Vitória	4	1	1	2	6	4	+2	3	Eliminated

=== Sergipe-Bahia ===
Pos	Team	Pld	W	D	L	GF	GA	GD	Pts	Qualification
1	Sergipe	6	6	0	0	14	3	+11	12	Qualified to 1994 Série B
2	(Bahia) Catuense	6	1	2	3	6	7	−1	4	Eliminated
3	(Sergipe) Confiança	6	1	2	3	5	11	−6	4	Eliminated
4	(Sergipe) Itabaiana	6	0	4	2	3	7	−4	4	Eliminated

=== Maranhão-Piauí ===
==== Maranhão ====
Imperatriz, with no chances at qualifying, did not appear for its final match against Sampaio Corrêa. As punishment, the result of its final match was counted as a 1–0 victory for Sampaio Corrêa, and the point earned against in the draw against Sampaio Corrêa in the first match was given to Sampaio Corrêa, tying it and Moto Club in number of points, forcing an extra match, won by Moto Club by 2–1.

Pos	Team	Pld	W	D	L	GF	GA	GD	Pts	Qualification
1	(Maranhão) Moto Club	4	2	2	0	5	2	+3	6	Qualified to 1994 Série B
2	(Maranhão) Sampaio Corrêa	4	1	3	0	4	3	+1	6 (Note: 1 bonus point?)	Eliminated
3	(Maranhão) Imperatriz	4	0	1	3	1	5	−4	0 (Note: 1 point deducted?)	Eliminated

==== Piauí ====
Team 1	Agg.	Team 2	1st leg	2nd leg
Picos	1-2	River	1-2	0-0

==== Finals ====
Team 1	Agg.	Team 2	1st leg	2nd leg
Moto Club (Maranhão)	2-1	(Piauí) River	2-1	0-0

== First phase ==
=== Group A ===
Pos	Team	Pld	W	D	L	GF	GA	GD	Pts	Qualification or relegation
1	(Rio Grande do Norte) América-RN	10	4	5	1	16	12	+4	13	Qualified to the Second phase
2	(Pará) Tuna Luso	10	5	1	4	15	11	+4	11	Qualified to the Second phase
3	(Maranhão) Moto Club	10	3	4	3	12	16	−4	10	Qualified to the Second phase
4	Ceará	10	3	4	3	16	12	+4	10	Qualified to the Second phase
5	(Pernambuco) Central	10	3	4	3	18	16	+2	10	Eliminated
6	(Ceará) Fortaleza	10	1	4	5	9	19	−10	6	Relegated to 1995 Série C

=== Group B ===
Pos	Team	Pld	W	D	L	GF	GA	GD	Pts	Qualification
1	Sergipe	10	5	1	4	15	12	+3	11	Qualified to the Second phase
2	(Espírito Santo) Desportiva	10	4	3	3	8	8	0	11	Qualified to the Second phase
3	(Rio de Janeiro (state)) Americano	10	4	3	3	7	8	−1	11	Qualified to the Second phase
4	(Pernambuco) Santa Cruz	10	3	4	3	11	11	0	10	Qualified to the Second phase
5	(Minas Gerais) Democrata	10	1	7	2	7	8	−1	9	Eliminated
6	(Alagoas) CRB	10	3	2	5	10	11	−1	8	Eliminated

=== Group C ===
Pos	Team	Pld	W	D	L	GF	GA	GD	Pts	Qualification
1	Goiás	10	5	3	2	15	9	+6	13	Qualified to the Second phase
2	(Paraná (state)) Atlético-PR	10	5	2	3	8	8	0	12	Qualified to the Second phase
3	(Paraná (state)) Londrina	10	3	4	3	13	13	0	10	Qualified to the Second phase
4	(Goiás) Goiatuba	10	4	1	5	11	10	+1	9	Qualified to the Second phase
5	(São Paulo (state)) América-SP	10	3	2	5	9	11	−2	8	Eliminated
6	(Mato Grosso) Barra do Garças	10	3	2	5	7	12	−5	8	Eliminated

=== Group D ===
Pos	Team	Pld	W	D	L	GF	GA	GD	Pts	Qualification or relegation
1	(São Paulo (state)) Ponte Preta	10	6	2	2	13	10	+3	14	Qualified to the Second phase
2	(São Paulo (state)) Mogi Mirim	10	4	4	2	11	6	+5	12	Qualified to the Second phase
3	(Rio Grande do Sul) Juventude	10	4	3	3	16	12	+4	11	Qualified to the Second phase
4	(Paraná (state)) Coritiba	10	4	3	3	12	8	+4	11	Qualified to the Second phase
5	(Rio de Janeiro (state)) Bangu	10	2	3	5	10	12	−2	7	Eliminated
6	(Federal District (Brazil)) Tiradentes-DF	10	2	1	7	6	20	−14	5	Relegated to 1995 Série C

== Second phase ==
=== Group E ===
Pos	Team	Pld	W	D	L	GF	GA	GD	Pts	Qualification
1	Desportiva	6	4	2	0	8	1	+7	10	Qualified to the Third phase
2	América-RN	6	3	1	2	7	5	+2	7	Eliminated
3	Moto Club	6	1	3	2	6	8	−2	5	Eliminated
4	Santa Cruz	6	0	2	4	6	13	−7	2	Eliminated

=== Group F ===
Pos	Team	Pld	W	D	L	GF	GA	GD	Pts	Qualification
1	Americano	6	3	2	1	8	3	+5	8	Qualified to the Third phase
2	Ceará	6	3	1	2	13	9	+4	7	Eliminated
3	Sergipe	6	3	0	3	5	6	−1	6	Eliminated
4	Tuna Luso	6	1	1	4	3	11	−8	3	Eliminated

=== Group G ===
Pos	Team	Pld	W	D	L	GF	GA	GD	Pts	Qualification
1	Goiás	6	4	2	0	9	3	+6	10	Qualified to the Third phase
2	Mogi Mirim	6	2	2	2	8	9	−1	6	Eliminated
3	Londrina	6	2	1	3	10	11	−1	5	Eliminated
4	Coritiba	6	1	1	4	8	12	−4	3	Eliminated

=== Group H ===
Pos	Team	Pld	W	D	L	GF	GA	GD	Pts	Qualification
1	Juventude	6	4	2	0	15	8	+7	10	Qualified to the Third phase
2	Atlético-PR	6	3	1	2	14	11	+3	7	Eliminated
3	Goiatuba	6	1	2	3	5	10	−5	4	Eliminated
4	Ponte Preta	6	1	1	4	9	14	−5	3	Eliminated

== Semifinals ==
Team 1	Agg.	Team 2	1st leg	2nd leg
Americano	0-2	Juventude	0-1	0-1
Desportiva	2-2	Goiás	2-0	0-2

== Finals ==
Team 1	Agg.	Team 2	1st leg	2nd leg
Goiás	3-3	Juventude	2-1	1-2

== Sources ==
- "Brazil Second Level 1994". rsssf.com.
- "Brazil 1994 Second Level Qualification". rsssf.com.
