= 1996 Campeonato Brasileiro Série B =

Campeonato Brasileiro Série B
- Season: 1996
- Champions: União São João
- Promoted: União São João; América-RN
- Top goalscorer: Maurício (Santa Cruz) - 13 goals
- Biggest home win: Volta Redonda 5-0 Londrina (August 28, 1996)
- Biggest away win: Ponte Preta 0-4 Mogi Mirim (August 18, 1996)
- Highest scoring: Joinville 5-3 Atlético-GO (September 22, 1996); Mogi Mirim 5-3 Ponte Preta (September 8, 1996)

The 1996 Campeonato Brasileiro Série B, the second level of Brazilian National League, was played from August 8 to December 8, 1996. The competition had 25 clubs and two of them were promoted to Série A and three were to be relegated to Série C. The competition was won by União São João.

União São João finished the final phase group with the most points, and was declared 1996 Brazilian Série B champions, claiming the promotion to the 1997 Série A along with América-RN, the runners-up. The three worst ranked teams (Goiatuba, Sergipe and Central) were originally relegated to play Série C in 1997. However, with the cancellation of the relegations of Fluminense and Bragantino in the Série A, the three teams were kept in the Série B for 1997.

== Teams ==
Team	City	Stadium	1995 Season
ABC	Natal	Machadão	5th in Série C
América-MG	Belo Horizonte	Independência	did not participate
América-RN	Natal	Machadão	16th in Série B
Americano	Campos dos Goytacazes	Godofredo Cruz	12th in Série B
Atlético-GO	Goiânia	Serra Dourada	4th in Série C
Ceará	Fortaleza	Castelão	7th in Série B
Central	Caruaru	Lacerdão	4th in Série B
CRB	Maceió	Pajuçara	20th in Série B
Desportiva	Cariacica	Engenheiro Araripe	10th in Série B
Gama	Gama	Bezerrão	3rd in Série C
Goiatuba	Goiatuba	Divino Garcia Rosa	11th in Série B
Joinville	Joinville	Ernestão	6th in Série C
Londrina	Londrina	Café	13th in Série B
Mogi Mirim	Mogi Mirim	Wilson Fernandes de Barros	3rd in Série B
Moto Club	São Luís	Castelão	17th in Série B
Náutico	Recife	Aflitos	19th in Série B
Paysandu	Belém	Curuzú	23rd in Série A
Ponte Preta	Campinas	Moisés Lucarelli	23rd in Série B
Remo	Belém	Mangueirão	5th in Série B
Santa Cruz	Recife	Arruda	9th in Série B
Tuna Luso	Belém	Francisco Vasques	14th in Série B
Sergipe	Aracaju	João Hora	6th in Série B
União São João	Araras	Herminião	24th in Série A
Volta Redonda	Volta Redonda	Raulino de Oliveira	2nd in Série C
XV de Piracicaba	Piracicaba	Barão da Serra Negra	1st in Série C

== First phase ==
=== Group A ===
Team	Pld	W	D	L	GF	GA	GD	Pts	Qualification
(Pará) Remo	8	4	3	1	14	9	+5	15	Advance to the Round of 16
(Maranhão) Moto Club	8	2	4	2	9	8	+1	10	Advance to the Round of 16
(Pará) Tuna Luso	8	2	4	2	7	7	0	10	Advance to the Round of 16
Ceará	8	2	3	3	6	10	−4	9	
(Pará) Paysandu	8	2	2	4	10	12	−2	8	

=== Group B ===
Team	Pld	W	D	L	GF	GA	GD	Pts	Qualification or relegation
(Pernambuco) Santa Cruz	8	5	2	1	16	8	+8	17	Advance to the Round of 16
(Rio Grande do Norte) América-RN	8	4	2	2	8	8	0	14	Advance to the Round of 16
(Pernambuco) Náutico	8	3	3	2	10	11	−1	12	Advance to the Round of 16
(Alagoas) CRB	8	2	2	4	10	10	0	8	
(Pernambuco) Central	8	1	1	6	9	16	−7	4	Relegated to the Série C 1997

=== Group C ===
Team	Pld	W	D	L	GF	GA	GD	Pts	Qualification
(São Paulo (state)) XV de Piracicaba	8	4	2	2	13	7	+6	14	Advance to the Round of 16
(São Paulo (state)) União São João	8	4	1	3	12	11	+1	13	Advance to the Round of 16
(Espírito Santo) Desportiva	8	3	3	2	11	9	+2	12	Advance to the Round of 16
(Rio de Janeiro (state)) Americano	8	3	2	3	11	9	+2	11	Advance to the Round of 16
Sergipe	8	1	2	5	6	17	−11	5	Relegated to the Série C 1997

=== Group D ===
Team	Pld	W	D	L	GF	GA	GD	Pts	Qualification
(Minas Gerais) América-MG	8	6	1	1	13	7	+6	19	Advance to the Round of 16
(Goiás) Atlético-GO	8	3	2	3	10	10	0	11	Advance to the Round of 16
(Santa Catarina (state)) Joinville	8	3	1	4	13	11	+2	10	Advance to the Round of 16
(Federal District (Brazil)) Gama	8	2	3	3	8	9	−1	9	
(Rio Grande do Norte) ABC	8	2	1	5	6	13	−7	7	

=== Group E ===
Team	Pld	W	D	L	GF	GA	GD	Pts	Qualification or relegation
(São Paulo (state)) Mogi Mirim	8	5	2	1	18	6	+12	17	Advance to the Round of 16
(Rio de Janeiro (state)) Volta Redonda	8	3	2	3	11	8	+3	11	Advance to the Round of 16
(Paraná (state)) Londrina	8	3	2	3	8	15	−7	11	Advance to the Round of 16
(São Paulo (state)) Ponte Preta	8	2	3	3	13	17	−4	9	
(Goiás) Goiatuba	8	1	3	4	6	10	−4	6	Relegated to the Série C 1997

== Second phase ==
Team 1	Agg.	Team 2	1st leg	2nd leg
Joinville	2–3	Remo	1–2	1–1
Londrina	3–1	XV de Piracicaba	1–1	2–0
Moto Club	3–1	Santa Cruz	2–0	1–1
Atlético-GO	3–4	América-RN	3–2	0–2
Tuna Luso	1–4	Mogi Mirim	0–0	1–4
Volta Redonda	1–4	União São João	1–1	0–3
Americano	2–3	América-MG	2–2	0–1
Náutico	3–3(p)	Desportiva	2–1	1–2

== Quarterfinals ==
Team 1	Agg.	Team 2	1st leg	2nd leg
Londrina	1–1(p)	Remo	1–0	0–1
Moto Club	0–4	América-RN	0–0	0–4
União São João	1–1(p)	Mogi Mirim	0–1	1–0
Náutico	4–2	América-MG	3–0	1–2

== Final phase ==
Pos	Team	Pld	W	D	L	GF	GA	GD	Pts	Promotion	USJ	ARN	NAU	LON
1	União São João	6	3	2	1	11	8	+3	11	Promoted to Série A 1998		3–1	1–1	1–1
2	América-RN	6	3	0	3	8	12	−4	9	Promoted to Série A 1998	2–1		1–0	2–1
3	Náutico	6	2	2	2	10	6	+4	8		1–2	4–1		3–0
4	Londrina	6	1	2	3	8	11	−3	5		1–1	3–1	1–1	

Legend: Blue = home team win; Yellow = draw; Red = away team win.

== Final standings ==
Pos	Team	Pld	W	D	L	GF	GA	GD	Pts	Promotion or relegation
1	União São João	18	9	4	5	28	21	+7	31	Promoted to 1997 Série A
2	América-RN	18	9	3	6	24	23	+1	30	Promoted to 1997 Série A
3	Náutico	18	7	5	6	27	22	+5	26	Reached Final phase group
4	Londrina	18	6	5	7	20	28	−8	23	Reached Final phase group
5	América-MG	12	8	2	2	18	13	+5	26	Reached Third phase
6	Mogi Mirim	12	7	3	2	23	8	+15	24	Reached Third phase
7	Remo	12	6	4	2	18	12	+6	22	Reached Third phase
8	Moto Club	12	3	6	3	12	13	−1	15	Reached Third phase
9	Santa Cruz	10	5	3	2	17	11	+6	18	Reached the Second phase
10	XV de Piracicaba	10	4	3	3	14	10	+4	15	Reached the Second phase
11	Desportiva	10	4	3	3	14	12	+2	15	Reached the Second phase
12	Atlético-GO	10	4	2	4	13	14	−1	14	Reached the Second phase
13	Americano	10	3	3	4	13	12	+1	12	Reached the Second phase
14	Volta Redonda	10	3	3	4	12	12	0	12	Reached the Second phase
15	Joinville	10	3	2	5	15	14	+1	11	Reached the Second phase
16	Tuna Luso	10	2	5	3	8	11	−3	11	Reached the Second phase
17	Gama	8	2	3	3	8	9	−1	9	
18	Ponte Preta	8	2	3	3	13	17	−4	9	
19	Ceará	8	2	3	3	6	10	−4	9	
20	CRB	8	2	2	4	10	10	0	8	
21	Paysandu	8	2	2	4	10	12	−2	8	
22	ABC	8	2	1	5	6	13	−7	7	
23	Goiatuba	8	1	3	4	6	10	−4	6	Relegated to 1997 Série C
24	Sergipe	8	1	2	5	6	17	−11	5	Relegated to 1997 Série C
25	Central	8	1	1	6	9	16	−7	4	Relegated to 1997 Série C

== Sources ==
- "Brazil Second Level 1996". rsssf.com.
