= Clemer =

Brazilian footballer and manager (born 1968)

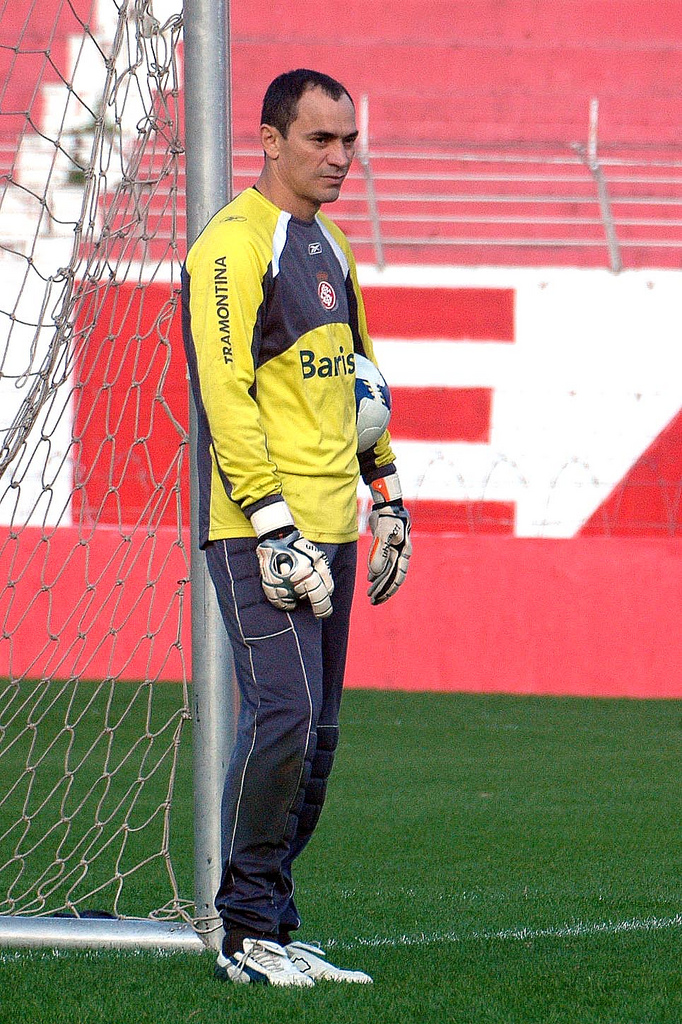

Personal information
- Full name: Clemer Melo da Silva
- Date of birth: October 20, 1968 (age 58)
- Place of birth: São Luís, MA, Brazil
- Height: 1.91 m (6 ft 3 in)
- Position: Goalkeeper

Team information
- Current team: (coach)

Youth career
- 1986–1987: Moto Club

Senior career*
Years	Team	Apps	(Gls)
1987	Moto Club	0	(0)
1988	Guaratinguetá	0	(0)
1989	Santo André	0	(0)
1989	Catuduvense	0	(0)
1990–1992	Maranhão	0	(0)
1993	Moto Club	0	(0)
1993	Ferroviário	23	(0)
1994–1995	Remo	24	(0)
1995	Goiás	23	(0)
1996–1997	Portuguesa	27	(1)
1997–2001	Flamengo	84	(0)
2002–2009	Internacional	210	(1)
Total		391	(2)

Managerial career
- 2011–2013: Internacional U-17
- 2013: Internacional U-20
- 2013: Internacional (caretaker)
- 2014–2015: Internacional U-23
- 2016: Glória
- 2016: Sergipe
- 2017–2018: Brasil de Pelotas
- * Club domestic league appearances and goals

Clemer Melo da Silva or simply Clemer (born October 20, 1968), is a Brazilian retired footballer who played as goalkeeper and current manager.

== Career ==
On March 4, 1997, he scored his first goal, in a Copa do Brasil match between his club, Portuguesa, and Kaburé. On May 4, 2008 he scored his first goal for Internacional in a penalty kick in the final match of Campeonato Gaúcho against Juventude.

On January 4, 2010, Internacional announced Clemer as newest Goalkeeping Coach. After he served as coach of the club and driving temporarily the main cast, until its output on May 8, 2015. after fallen out again with the coacher of U-23. in October of the same year, has signed with commanded Glória in season 2016.

== List of goals scored ==
Following, is the list with the goals scored by Clemer:

#	Date	Venue	Host team	Result	Away team	Competition	Score	Type	Opponent goalkeeper
1	4 March 1997	Estádio do Canindé, São Paulo	Portuguesa	8–0	Kaburé	Copa do Brasil	8–0	Penalty kick	
2	4 May 2008	Estádio Beira-Rio, Porto Alegre	Internacional	8–1	Juventude	Campeonato Gaúcho	8–1	Penalty kick	Michel Alves

== Honours ==
=== Player ===
Remo

- Campeonato Paraense: 1994, 1995

Goiás

- Campeonato Goiano: 1996

Flamengo

- Campeonato Carioca: 1999, 2000, 2001
- Copa Mercosur: 1999
- Taça Rio: 2000
- Taça Guanabara: 2001
- Copa dos Campeões: 2001

Internacional

- Campeonato Gaúcho: 2002, 2003, 2004, 2005, 2008, 2009
- Copa Libertadores de América: 2006
- FIFA Club World Cup: 2006
- Recopa Sudamericana: 2007
- Dubai Cup: 2008
- Copa Sudamericana: 2008
- Suruga Bank Championship: 2009

=== Manager ===
Sergipe

- Campeonato Sergipano: 2016
