= 1997 Campeonato Brasileiro Série B =

Campeonato Brasileiro Série B
- Season: 1997
- Champions: América-MG
- Promoted: América-MG; Ponte Preta
- Relegated: Mogi Mirim; Sergipe; Moto Club; Central; Goiatuba
- Top goalscorer: Tupãzinho (América-MG) - 13
- Biggest home win: América-MG 5-0 Tuna Luso (November 9, 1997)
- Biggest away win: Moto Club 1-4 Gama (August 17, 1997)
- Highest scoring: Tuna Luso 5-3 Moto Club (August 13, 1997)

The 1997 Campeonato Brasileiro Série B, the second level of the Brazilian National League, was played from August 9 to December 7, 1997. The competition had 25 clubs and two of them were promoted to Série A and five were relegated to Série C. The competition was won by América-MG.

América-MG finished the final phase group with the most points, and were declared Série B champions, claiming the promotion to the 1998 Série A along with Ponte Preta, the runners-up. The five worst ranked teams in each group (Mogi Mirim, Sergipe, Moto Club, Central and Goiatuba) were relegated to play Série C in 1998.

== Teams ==
Team	City	Stadium	1996 Season
ABC	Natal	Machadão	22nd in Série B
América-MG	Belo Horizonte	Independência	5th in Série B
Americano	Rio de Janeiro	Godofredo Cruz	13th in Série B
Atlético-GO	Goiânia	Serra Dourada	12th in Série B
Botafogo-SP	Ribeirão Preto	Santa Cruz	2nd in Série C
Ceará	Fortaleza	Castelão	19th in Série B
Central	Caruaru	Lacerdão	25th in Série B
CRB	Maceió	Pajuçara	20th in Série B
Desportiva	Cariacica	Engenheiro Araripe	11th in Série B
Gama	Gama	Bezerrão	17th in Série B
Goiatuba	Goiatuba	Divino Garcia Rosa	23rd in Série B
Joinville	Joinville	Ernestão	15th in Série B
Londrina	Londrina	Café	4th in Série B
Mogi Mirim	Mogi Mirim	Wilson Fernandes de Barros	6th in Série B
Moto Club	São Luís	Castelão	8th in Série B
Náutico	Recife	Aflitos	3rd in Série B
Paysandu	Belém	Curuzú	21st in Série B
Ponte Preta	Campinas	Moisés Lucarelli	18th in Série B
Remo	Belém	Mangueirão	7th in Série B
Santa Cruz	Recife	Arruda	9th in Série B
Tuna Luso	Belém	Francisco Vasques	16th in Série B
Sergipe	Aracaju	João Hora	24th in Série B
Vila Nova	Goiânia	Serra Dourada	1st in Série C
Volta Redonda	Volta Redonda	Raulino de Oliveira	14th in Série B
XV de Piracicaba	Piracicaba	Barão da Serra Negra	10th in Série B

== First phase ==
=== Group A ===
Team	Pld	W	D	L	GF	GA	GD	Pts	Qualification or relegation
(Federal District (Brazil)) Gama	8	4	3	1	12	5	+7	15	Advance to the Round of 16
(Pará) Tuna Luso	8	4	3	1	9	5	+4	15	Advance to the Round of 16
(Goiás) Atlético-GO	8	2	3	3	7	9	−2	9	Advance to the Round of 16
(Pará) Remo	8	2	2	4	8	8	0	8	
(Maranhão) Moto Club	8	1	3	4	10	19	−9	6	Relegated to the Série C 1998

=== Group B ===
Team	Pld	W	D	L	GF	GA	GD	Pts	Qualification or relegation
Ceará	8	5	2	1	8	7	+1	17	Advance to the Round of 16
(Pará) Paysandu	8	4	2	2	12	7	+5	14	Advance to the Round of 16
(Rio Grande do Norte) ABC	8	3	3	2	9	6	+3	12	Advance to the Round of 16
(Pernambuco) Santa Cruz	8	2	1	5	6	12	−6	7	
(Pernambuco) Central	8	1	2	5	8	11	−3	5	Relegated to the Série C 1998

=== Group C ===
Team	Pld	W	D	L	GF	GA	GD	Pts	Qualification or relegation
(Alagoas) CRB	8	4	1	3	10	10	0	13	Advance to the Round of 16
(Minas Gerais) América-MG	8	4	1	3	9	11	−2	13	Advance to the Round of 16
(Goiás) Vila Nova	8	3	3	2	13	8	+5	12	Advance to the Round of 16
(Pernambuco) Náutico	8	3	2	3	11	11	0	11	Advance to the Round of 16
Sergipe	8	1	3	4	9	12	−3	6	Relegated to the Série C 1998

=== Group D ===
Team	Pld	W	D	L	GF	GA	GD	Pts	Qualification or relegation
(São Paulo (state)) Ponte Preta	8	5	2	1	11	4	+7	17	Advance to the Round of 16
(Espírito Santo) Desportiva	8	4	2	2	5	3	+2	14	Advance to the Round of 16
(Rio de Janeiro (state)) Americano	8	3	3	2	8	8	0	12	Advance to the Round of 16
(São Paulo (state)) Botafogo-SP	8	3	1	4	11	14	−3	10	
(Goiás) Goiatuba	8	0	2	6	2	8	−6	2	Relegated to the Série C 1998

=== Group E ===
Team	Pld	W	D	L	GF	GA	GD	Pts	Qualification or relegation
(Paraná (state)) Londrina	8	5	1	2	12	8	+4	16	Advance to the Round of 16
(Santa Catarina (state)) Joinville	8	4	2	2	11	9	+2	14	Advance to the Round of 16
(São Paulo (state)) XV de Piracicaba	8	3	2	3	11	14	−3	11	Advance to the Round of 16
(Rio de Janeiro (state)) Volta Redonda	8	2	2	4	10	11	−1	8	
(São Paulo (state)) Mogi Mirim	8	1	3	4	10	12	−2	6	Relegated to the Série C 1998

== Second phase ==
Teams			Scores			
Team 1	Points	Team 2	1st leg	2nd leg	3rd leg	Agg.
ABC (Rio Grande do Norte)	1:7	(Federal District (Brazil)) Gama	2:2	0:3	1:3	3:8
Vila Nova (Goiás)	4:4	Ceará	2:0	1:1	0:1	3:2
Americano (Rio de Janeiro (state))	3:6	(Alagoas) CRB	2:1	0:2	1:5	3:8
XV de Piracicaba (São Paulo (state))	1:7	(São Paulo (state)) Ponte Preta	1:1	1:2	0:1	2:4
Náutico^{1} (Pernambuco)	4:4	(Paraná (state)) Londrina	2:1	0:1	1:1	3:3
América-MG (Minas Gerais)	7:1	(Espírito Santo) Desportiva	2:0	1:1	2:1	5:2
Paysandu (Pará)	4:4	(Pará) Tuna Luso	2:1	0:0	0:4	2:5
Atlético-GO (Goiás)	0:6	(Santa Catarina (state)) Joinville	1:2	1:2	—	2:4

^{1}Náutico qualified after defeating Londrina on a penalty shoot-out.

== Third phase ==
=== Group F ===
Team	Pld	W	D	L	GF	GA	GD	Pts	Qualification
(São Paulo (state)) Ponte Preta	6	3	2	1	14	9	+5	11	Advanced to the Final phase
(Pernambuco) Náutico	6	3	1	2	12	9	+3	10	Advanced to the Final phase
(Alagoas) CRB	6	3	1	2	10	12	−2	10	
(Federal District (Brazil)) Gama	6	0	2	4	6	12	−6	2	

=== Group G ===
Team	Pld	W	D	L	GF	GA	GD	Pts	Qualification
(Minas Gerais) América-MG	6	4	1	1	13	4	+9	13	Advanced to the Final phase
(Goiás) Vila Nova	6	4	0	2	7	6	+1	12	Advanced to the Final phase
(Santa Catarina (state)) Joinville	6	1	2	3	7	9	−2	5	
(Pará) Tuna Luso	6	1	1	4	6	14	−8	4	

== Final phase ==
Pos	Team	Pld	W	D	L	GF	GA	GD	Pts	Promotion	AMG	PON	NAU	VIL
1	América-MG	6	4	1	1	7	1	+6	13	Promoted to Série A 1998		0–0	2–0	1–0
2	Ponte Preta	6	3	2	1	6	6	0	11	Promoted to Série A 1998	1–0		1–1	1–0
3	Náutico	6	2	2	2	9	6	+3	8		0–2	3–0		4–0
4	Vila Nova	6	0	1	5	3	12	−9	1		0–2	2–3	1–1	

Legend: Blue = home team win; Yellow = draw; Red = away team win.

== Final standings ==
Pos	Team	Pld	W	D	L	GF	GA	GD	Pts	Promotion or relegation
1	América-MG	23	14	4	5	34	18	+16	46	Promoted to 1998 Série A
2	Ponte Preta	23	13	7	3	35	21	+14	46	Promoted to 1998 Série A
3	Náutico	23	9	6	8	35	29	+6	33	Reached Final phase group
4	Vila Nova	23	8	5	10	26	28	−2	29	Reached Final phase group
5	CRB	17	9	2	6	28	25	+3	29	Reached Third phase
6	Joinville	16	7	4	5	22	20	+2	25	Reached Third phase
7	Gama	17	6	6	5	26	20	+6	24	Reached Third phase
8	Tuna Luso	17	6	5	6	20	21	−1	23	Reached Third phase
9	Ceará	11	6	3	2	10	10	0	21	Reached the Second phase
10	Londrina	11	6	2	3	15	11	+4	19 (Note: 1 point deducted?)	Reached the Second phase
11	Paysandu	11	5	3	3	14	12	+2	18	Reached the Second phase
12	Desportiva	11	4	3	4	7	8	−1	15	Reached the Second phase
13	Americano	11	4	3	4	11	14	−3	15	Reached the Second phase
14	ABC	11	3	4	4	12	14	−2	13	Reached the Second phase
15	XV de Piracicaba	11	3	3	5	13	18	−5	12	Reached the Second phase
16	Atlético-GO	10	2	3	5	9	13	−4	9	Reached the Second phase
17	Botafogo-SP	8	3	1	4	11	14	−3	10	
18	Remo	8	2	2	4	8	8	0	8	
19	Volta Redonda	8	2	2	4	10	11	−1	8	
20	Santa Cruz	8	2	1	5	6	12	−6	7	
21	Mogi Mirim	8	1	3	4	10	12	−2	6	Relegated to 1998 Série C
22	Sergipe	8	1	3	4	9	12	−3	6	Relegated to 1998 Série C
23	Moto Club	8	1	3	4	10	19	−9	6	Relegated to 1998 Série C
24	Central	8	1	2	5	8	11	−3	5	Relegated to 1998 Série C
25	Goiatuba	8	0	2	6	2	8	−6	2	Relegated to 1998 Série C

== Sources ==
- "Brazil Second Level 1997". rsssf.com.
