= Vinícius Baracioli =

Brazilian footballer

Personal information
- Full name: Vinícius Henrique Baracioli Maciel
- Date of birth: 17 April 2000 (age 26)
- Place of birth: Tanabi, Brazil
- Height: 1.78 m (5 ft 10 in)
- Position: Right back

Team information
- Current team: Mirassol

Youth career
- 2017–2020: Mirassol

Senior career*
Years	Team	Apps	(Gls)
2019–	Mirassol	31	(3)
2022–	→ Barra-SC (loan)	1	(0)
- * Club domestic league appearances and goals as of 30 January 2022

Vinícius Henrique Baracioli Maciel (born 17 April 2000), known as Vinícius Baracioli is a Brazilian footballer who plays for Barra-SC, on loan of Mirassol as a right back.

== Career statistics ==
As of 16 July 2021

Club	Season	League			State League		Cup		Conmebol		Other		Total	
Club	Season	Division	Apps	Goals	Apps	Goals	Apps	Goals	Apps	Goals	Apps	Goals	Apps	Goals
Mirassol	2019	Paulista	—		—		—		—		4 (Note: Appearance(s) in Copa Paulista)	0	4	0
Mirassol	2020	Série D	22	3	2	0	—		—		—		24	3
Mirassol	2021	Série C	0	0	2	0	1	0	—		—		3	0
Career total			22	3	4	0	1	0	0	0	4	0	31	3

== Honours ==
Mirassol

- Campeonato Brasileiro Série D: 2020

Votuporanguense

- Campeonato Paulista Série A3: 2024
