= Associação Atlética Alvorada =

Alvorada
- Full name: Associação Atlética Alvorada
- Nickname(s): Águia do Norte
- Founded: January 26, 1993 (32 years ago)
- Ground: Estádio Elias Ozias Natan, Alvorada, Tocantins state, Brazil
- Capacity: 2,000
Home colors	Away colors

Associação Atlética Alvorada, commonly known as Alvorada, is a Brazilian football club based in Alvorada, Tocantins state. They competed in the Série C and in the Copa do Brasil once.

== History ==
The club was founded on January 26, 1993. They won the Copa Tocantins in 1997, and the Campeonato Tocantinense in 1998. Alvorada competed in the Série C in 1998, when they were eliminated in the First Stage of the competition, and in the same year in the Copa do Brasil, when they were eliminated in the First Round by Atlético Mineiro.

== Achievements ==
- Campeonato Tocantinense:
  - Winners (1): 1998
- Copa Tocantins:
  - Winners (1): 1997

== Stadium ==
Associação Atlética Alvorada play their home games at Estádio Elias Ozias Natan. The stadium has a maximum capacity of 2,000 people.
