= Yasushi Kita =

Japanese footballer (born 1978)

Yasushi Kita 喜多 靖
Personal information
- Full name: Yasushi Kita
- Date of birth: April 25, 1978 (age 48)
- Place of birth: Takatsuki, Osaka, Japan
- Height: 1.83 m (6 ft 0 in)
- Position: Defender

Youth career
- 1994–1996: Kindai University High School

Senior career*
Years	Team	Apps	(Gls)
1997–2000	Júbilo Iwata	11	(0)
2000–2001	JEF United Ichihara	14	(0)
2002–2003	Cerezo Osaka	55	(3)
2004–2006	Albirex Niigata	45	(3)
2007–2009	Thespa Kusatsu	61	(1)
2010–2011	Gainare Tottori	44	(1)
Total		230	(8)
Medal record
Júbilo Iwata
Winner	J1 League	1997
Winner	J1 League	1999
Runner-up	J1 League	1998
Winner	J.League Cup	1998
Runner-up	J.League Cup	1997
Cerezo Osaka
Runner-up	Emperor's Cup	2003
- * Club domestic league appearances and goals

Yasushi Kita (喜多 靖, Kita Yasushi; born April 25, 1978) is a former Japanese football player.

== Playing career ==
Kita was born in Takatsuki on April 25, 1978. After graduating from Kindai University High School, he joined the J1 League club Júbilo Iwata in 1997. Although he also played as defensive midfielder not only center back, he could not play many matches in the club which many Japan national team players played. In April 2000, he moved to JEF United Ichihara. He played as a left defender of three backs defense. In 2002, he moved to the J2 League club Cerezo Osaka based in his local area. He became a regular player as a right defender of a three-back defense in 2002 and the club was promoted to J1. However his opportunity to play decreased in 2003. In 2004, he moved to the newly promoted J1 League club, Albirex Niigata. He also played as a left side back, not only as a center back, over three seasons. After eight months, he joined the J2 club Thespa Kusatsu in September 2007. Although he played as a regular center back in 2008, his opportunity to play decreased in 2009. In 2010, he moved to the Japan Football League club Gainare Tottori. He played as a regular player and the club won the championship in 2010. Although the club was promoted to J2 in 2011, his opportunity to play decreased and he retired at the end of the 2011 season.

== Club statistics ==
Club performance			League		Cup		League Cup		Total	
Season	Club	League	Apps	Goals	Apps	Goals	Apps	Goals	Apps	Goals
Japan			League		Emperor's Cup		J.League Cup		Total	
1997	Júbilo Iwata	J1 League	1	0	0	0	5	0	6	0
1998	Júbilo Iwata	J1 League	7	0	3	0	0	0	10	0
1999	Júbilo Iwata	J1 League	3	0	0	0	3	0	6	0
2000	Júbilo Iwata	J1 League	0	0	0	0	0	0	0	0
2000	JEF United Ichihara	J1 League	7	0	3	0	2	0	12	0
2001	JEF United Ichihara	J1 League	7	0	0	0	2	0	9	0
2002	Cerezo Osaka	J2 League	37	2	4	1	-		41	3
2003	Cerezo Osaka	J1 League	18	1	5	0	3	0	26	1
2004	Albirex Niigata	J1 League	17	0	1	0	1	0	19	0
2005	Albirex Niigata	J1 League	17	3	0	0	5	0	22	3
2006	Albirex Niigata	J1 League	11	0	0	0	1	0	12	0
2007	Thespa Kusatsu	J2 League	7	0	1	0	-		8	0
2008	Thespa Kusatsu	J2 League	33	1	1	0	-		34	1
2009	Thespa Kusatsu	J2 League	21	0	0	0	-		21	0
2010	Gainare Tottori	Football League	29	1	1	0	-		30	1
2011	Gainare Tottori	J2 League	15	0	0	0	-		15	0
Total			230	8	19	1	22	0	271	9
