= Eliézio =

Brazilian footballer (born 1987)

Personal information
- Full name: Eliézio Santos Santana
- Date of birth: March 31, 1987 (age 39)
- Place of birth: Salvador, Bahia, Brazil
- Height: 1.83 m (6 ft 0 in)
- Position: Central defender

Team information
- Current team: Fukushima United FC

Youth career
- 2002–2004: Kanto Daiichi High School

Senior career*
Years	Team	Apps	(Gls)
2005	Urawa Reds		
2006	Cruzeiro		
2007	Porto		
2007	→ União Leiria (loan)		
2007–2010	Cruzeiro		
2008	→ Itumbiara (loan)		
2009	→ Democrata-GV (loan)		
2010	→ América de Teófilo Otoni (Loan)		
2010–2011	São José-POA		
2011–2012	Portimonense		
2012	Avenida		
2012	Pelotas		
2012	Vera Cruz		
2013	Nacional de Manaus		
2014	URT		
2015	Sinop		
2015	Concórdia		
2016	Colo Colo		
2016	Marília		
2017	Interporto		
2018–	Fukushima United FC		

International career
2007	Brazil U20		
- * Club domestic league appearances and goals

Eliézio Santos Santana or simply Eliézio (born March 31, 1987, in Salvador, Bahia) is a Brazilian central defender.

== Honours ==
Urawa Red

- Emperor's Cup: 2005

Brazil U20

- South American Youth Championship: 2007

Itumbiara

- Campeonato Goiano: 2008

Interporto

- Campeonato Tocantinense: 2017
