= 1999 Copa do Brasil =

Copa do Brasil 1999

Tournament details
- Country: Brazil
- Dates: January 28 - June 27
- Teams: 65

Final positions
- Champions: Juventude (RS)
- Runners-up: Botafogo (RJ)

Tournament statistics
- Matches played: 117
- Goals scored: 366 (3.13 per match)
- Top goal scorer: Romário (7)

The Copa do Brasil 1999 was the 11th staging of the Copa do Brasil.

The competition started on January 28, 1999, and concluded on June 27, 1999, with the second leg of the final, held at the Estádio do Maracanã in Rio de Janeiro, in which Juventude lifted the trophy for the first time with a 0-0 draw with Botafogo.

Romário, of Flamengo, and Dejan Petković, of Vitória, with 7 goals each, were the competition's topscorers.

== Format ==
The competition was disputed by 65 clubs in a knock-out format where all rounds were played over two legs and the away goals rule was used, with the exception of the preliminary match, which was played in a single match, and in the first two rounds if the away team won the first leg with an advantage of at least two goals, the second leg was not played and the club automatically qualified to the next round.

== Competition stages ==
Preliminary match
1	Santa Cruz (PE)	1
2	Náutico (PE)	0

1st Round
1	CSA (AL)	0
64	São Paulo (SP)	4
33	Ypiranga (AP)	3 1
32	Picos (PI)	0 0
17	Comercial (MS)	0 1
48	Criciúma (SC)	1 3
49	Paysandu (PA)	2 2
16	Botafogo (RJ)	3 2
9	Rio Branco (ES)	1 0
56	Portuguesa (SP)	1 4
41	Independência (AC)	3 1
24	Roraima (RR)	1 1
25	Sampaio Corrêa (MA)	1
40	Atlético (PR)	3
57	Caxias (RS)	3 0
8	Cruzeiro (MG)	2 5
5	Vila Nova (GO)	2 0
60	Ceará (CE)	1 0
37	ABC (RN)	1 3
28	Grêmio (RS)	2 3
21	Sergipe (SE)	2 2
44	Ponte Preta (SP)	0 5
53	Botafogo (PB)	3 1
12	Flamengo (RJ)	3 2
13	São Raimundo (AM)	1 1
52	Palmeiras (SP)	2 3
45	Interporto (TO)	1
20	Gama (DF)	3
29	Flamengo (PI)	0 2
36	Vitória (BA)	1 5
61	Porto (PE)	0 0
4	América (MG)	1 2
3	Ubiratan (MS)	0 2
62	Corinthians (SP)	1 6
35	Treze (PB)	2 4
30	Santa Cruz (PE)	3 2
19	Guará (DF)	1
46	Juventude (RS)	5
51	Lagartense (SE)	0 1
14	Fluminense (RJ)	1 2
11	Fortaleza (CE)	1
54	Coritiba (PR)	3
43	Figueirense (SC)	1 0
22	Avaí (SC)	2 0
27	Botafogo (SP)	1 0
38	Bahia (BA)	0 5
59	Linhares (ES)	0
6	Atlético (MG)	3
7	Remo (PA)	1 1
58	Guarani (SP)	1 3
39	Nacional (AM)	0
26	Sport (PE)	2
23	Camaçari (BA)	2 1
42	Paraná (PR)	0 2
55	Villa Nova (MG)	1 1
10	Internacional (RS)	1 4
15	Sinop (MT)	0 0
50	Santos (SP)	1 6
47	Moto Club (MA)	3 0
18	Goiás (GO)	2 4
31	CRB (AL)	1 1
34	América (RN)	1 2
63	Ji-Paraná (RO)	2
2	Vasco (RJ)	4

2nd Round
São Paulo (SP)	4
Ypiranga (AP)	1
Criciúma (SC)	2 0
Botafogo (RJ)	1 2
Portuguesa (SP)	3
Independência (AC)	1
Atlético (PR)	0 3
Cruzeiro (MG)	0 3
Vila Nova (GO)	2 2
Grêmio (RS)	1 4
Ponte Preta (SP)	0 0
Flamengo (RJ)	1 3
Palmeiras (SP)	1 5
Gama (DF)	0 0
Vitória (BA)	1 3
América (MG)	0 0
Corinthians (SP)	2 2 (pen: 4)
Treze (PB)	2 2 (pen: 2)
Juventude (RS)	1 6
Fluminense (RJ)	3 0
Coritiba (PR)	2 0
Avaí (SC)	2 0
Bahia (BA)	1 1
Atlético (MG)	1 0
Guarani (SP)	0 1
Sport (PE)	0 1
Camaçari (BA)	0 0
Internacional (RS)	0 1
Santos (SP)	2 3
Goiás (GO)	1 4
América (RN)	0 0
Vasco (RJ)	1 2

3rd Round
São Paulo (SP)	1 1
Botafogo (RJ)	1 3
Portuguesa (SP)	2 2
Atlético (PR)	5 2
Grêmio (RS)	1 2
Flamengo (RJ)	2 2
Palmeiras (SP)	2 3
Vitória (BA)	2 2
Corinthians (SP)	0 0
Juventude (RS)	2 1
Coritiba (PR)	0 1
Bahia (BA)	3 1
Guarani (SP)	0 1
Internacional (RS)	3 1
Goiás (GO)	4 1
Vasco (RJ)	2 2

Quarterfinals
Botafogo (RJ)	2 1 (pen: 4)
Atlético (PR)	1 2 (pen: 1)
Flamengo (RJ)	2 2
Palmeiras (SP)	1 4
Juventude (RS)	2 2 (pen: 4)
Bahia (BA)	2 2 (pen: 1)
Internacional (RS)	1 1
Goiás (GO)	0 2

Semifinals
Botafogo (RJ)	1 1 (pen: 4)
Palmeiras (SP)	1 1 (pen: 2)
Juventude (RS)	0 4
Internacional (RS)	0 0

Finals
Botafogo (RJ)	1 2
Juventude (RS)	2 4

Copa do Brasil
1999 Winners
Juventude
First Title
