= 1995 in Brazilian football =

Football in Brazil
- Season: 1995

The following article presents a summary of the 1995 football (soccer) season in Brazil, which was the 94th season of competitive football in the country.

== Campeonato Brasileiro Série A ==
Semifinals

Team 1	Agg.	Team 2	1st leg	2nd leg
Cruzeiro	1-1	Botafogo	1-1	0-0
Fluminense	6-6	Santos	4-1	2-5

Final

December 13, 1995

Botafogo	2–1	Santos

Maracanã

December 17, 1995

Santos	1–1	Botafogo

Pacamebu

Botafogo declared as the Campeonato Brasileiro champions by aggregate score of 3–2.

=== Relegation ===
The worst placed team in each one of the two groups in the first stage of the competition, which are Paysandu and União São João, were relegated to the following year's second level.

== Campeonato Brasileiro Série B ==
Pos	Team	Pld	W	D	L	GF	GA	GD	Pts	Qualification	ATL	COR	MOG	CEN
1	Atlético-PR	6	4	1	1	8	5	+3	13	Promoted to 1996 Série A		1–1	1–0	4–1
2	Coritiba	6	3	2	1	15	6	+9	11	Promoted to 1996 Série A	3–0		5–0	4–2
3	Mogi Mirim	6	2	1	3	8	9	−1	7		0–1	1–1		3–0
4	Central	6	1	0	5	6	17	−11	3		0–1	2–1	1–4	

Atlético Paranaense declared as the Campeonato Brasileiro Série B champions.

=== Promotion ===
The two best placed teams in the final stage of the competition, which are Atlético Paranaense and Coritiba, were promoted to the following year's first level.

=== Relegation ===
The two worst placed teams in all the four groups in the first stage, which are Democrata-GV and Ponte Preta, were relegated to the following year's third level.

== Campeonato Brasileiro Série C ==
Quarterfinals

Team 1	Agg.	Team 2	1st leg	2nd leg
Atlético Goianiense	2-1	Ji-Paraná	1-0	1-1
Rio Branco-ES	1-2	Volta Redonda	0-1	1-1
Gama	2-2	ABC	1-0	1-2
Joinville	1-1	XV de Piracicaba	1-0	0-1 (2-4 pen)

Semifinals

Team 1	Agg.	Team 2	1st leg	2nd leg
Atlético Goianiense	1-4	Volta Redonda	1-2	0-2
XV de Piracicaba	2-1	Gama	2-0	0-1

Final

December 3, 1995

XV de Piracicaba	2–0	Volta Redonda

December 10, 1995

Volta Redonda	0–1	XV de Piracicaba

Vila Nova declared as the Campeonato Brasileiro Série C champions by aggregate score of 3–0.

=== Promotion ===
The champion and the runner-up, which are XV de Piracicaba and Volta Redonda, were promoted to the following year's second level.

== Copa do Brasil ==
The Copa do Brasil final was played between Corinthians and Grêmio.

June 14, 1995

Corinthians	2–1	Grêmio

Pacamebu

June 21, 1995

Grêmio	0–1	Corinthians

Olímpico

Corinthians declared as the cup champions by aggregate score of 3–1.

== State championship champions ==
State	Champion	State	Champion
Acre	Juventus-AC	Paraíba	Santa Cruz-PB
Alagoas	CRB	Paraná	Paraná
Amapá	Independente	Pernambuco	Santa Cruz
Amazonas	Nacional	Piauí	Cori-Sabbá
Bahia	Vitória	Rio de Janeiro	Fluminense
Ceará	Ferroviário-CE	Rio Grande do Norte	ABC
Distrito Federal	Gama	Rio Grande do Sul	Grêmio
Espírito Santo	Linhares EC	Rondônia	Ji-Paraná
Goiás	Vila Nova	Roraima	Atlético Roraima
Maranhão	Maranhão	Santa Catarina	Criciúma
Mato Grosso	Operário (VG)	São Paulo	Corinthians
Mato Grosso do Sul	SERC	Sergipe	Sergipe
Minas Gerais	Atlético Mineiro	Tocantins	Intercap
Pará	Remo		

== Youth competition champions ==
Competition	Champion
Copa Santiago de Futebol Juvenil	Grêmio
Copa São Paulo de Juniores	Corinthians
Taça Belo Horizonte de Juniores	Cru\eiro

== Other competition champions ==
Competition	Champion
Copa dos Campeões Mundiais	São Paulo
Copa Oro	Cruzeiro
Copa Pernambuco	Vitória-PE
Copa Rio	Volta Redonda
Copa Santa Catarina	Avaí
Torneio Mercosul	Figueirense

== Brazilian clubs in international competitions ==
Team	Copa Libertadores 1995	Supercopa Sudamericana 1995	Copa CONMEBOL 1995	Intercontinental Cup 1995
Atlético Mineiro	Did not qualify	Did not qualify	Runner-up	N/A
Ceará	Did not qualify	Did not qualify	Round of 16	N/A
Corinthians	Did not qualify	Did not qualify	Quarterfinals	N/A
Cruzeiro	Did not qualify	Semifinals	Did not qualify	N/A
Flamengo	Did not qualify	Runner-up	Did not qualify	N/A
Grêmio	Champions	Quarterfinals	Did not qualify	Runner-up
Guarani	Did not qualify	Did not qualify	Round of 16	N/A
Palmeiras	Quarterfinals	Did not qualify	Did not qualify	N/A
Santos	Did not qualify	Round of 16	Did not qualify	N/A
São Paulo	Did not qualify	Quarterfinals	Did not qualify	N/A

== Brazil national team ==
The following table lists all the games played by the Brazil national football team in official competitions and friendly matches during 1995.

Date	Opposition	Result	Score	Brazil scorers	Competition
February 22, 1995	Slovakia	W	5-0	Souza, Bebeto (2), Túlio, Márcio Santos	International Friendly
March 29, 1995	Honduras	D	1-1	Túlio	International Friendly
April 27, 1995	(Spain) Valencia	W	4-2	Túlio (3), Juninho Paulista	International Friendly (unofficial match)
May 17, 1995	Israel	W	2-1	Túlio, Rivaldo	International Friendly
June 4, 1995	Sweden	W	1-0	Edmundo	Umbro Cup
June 6, 1995	Japan	W	3-0	Zinho (2), Roberto Carlos	Umbro Cup
June 11, 1995	England	W	3-1	Juninho Paulista, Ronaldo, Edmundo	Umbro Cup
June 29, 1995	Poland	W	2-1	Túlio (2)	International Friendly
July 7, 1995	Ecuador	W	1-0	Ronaldão	Copa América
July 10, 1995	Peru	W	2-0	Zinho, Edmundo	Copa América
July 13, 1995	Colombia	W	3-0	Leonardo, Túlio, Juninho Paulista	Copa América
July 17, 1995	Argentina	D	2-2 (4-2 pen)	Edmundo, Túlio	Copa América
July 20, 1995	United States	W	1-0	Aldair	Copa América
July 23, 1995	Uruguay	D	1-1 (3-5 pen)	Túlio	Copa América
August 9, 1995	Japan	W	5-1	Fukuda (own goal), Edmundo, Leonardo, César Sampaio, Sávio	International Friendly
August 12, 1995	South Korea	W	1-0	Dunga	International Friendly
September 27, 1995	Romania	D	2-2	Marques, Sávio	International Friendly
October 11, 1995	Uruguay	W	2-0	Ronaldo (2)	International Friendly
November 8, 1995	Argentina	W	1-0	Donizete	International Friendly
December 20, 1995	Colombia	W	3-1	Túlio (2), Carlinhos	International Friendly

== Women's football ==
=== Brazil women's national football team ===
The following table lists all the games played by the Brazil women's national football team in official competitions and friendly matches during 1995.

Date	Opposition	Result	Score	Brazil scorers	Competition
January 8, 1995	Ecuador	W	13–0	Pretinha (4), Cenira, Roseli, Michael Jackson (2), Sissi (2), Russa (3)	Sudamericano Femenino
January 10, 1995	Chile	W	6–1	Sissi (2), Roseli, Cenira, Michael Jackson (2)	Sudamericano Femenino
January 14, 1995	Argentina	W	8–0	Sissi (2), Roseli, Pretinha (2), Sissi (2), Elane	Sudamericano Femenino
January 18, 1995	Bolivia	W	15–0	Roseli (3), Michael Jackson (3), Sissi (4), Elane, Duda, Cenira (2), Bel	Sudamericano Femenino
January 22, 1995	Argentina	W	2–0	Michael Jackson, Roseli	Sudamericano Femenino
April 9, 1995	(São Paulo (state)) São Paulo State Combined Team	W	4–0	Sissi (2), Elane, Roseli	Torneio Cidade de Uberlândia (unofficial match)
April 11, 1995	Argentina	W	4–0	Sissi (2), Elane, Cenira	Torneio Cidade de Uberlândia
April 13, 1995	Australia	W	3–0	Sissi, Roseli (2)	Torneio Cidade de Uberlândia
April 16, 1995	Australia	L	2–3	Sissi, Roseli	Torneio Cidade de Uberlândia
May 12, 1995	United States	L	0–3	-	International Friendly
May 14, 1995	United States	L	1–4	unavailable	International Friendly
June 5, 1995	Sweden	W	1–0	Roseli	World Cup
June 7, 1995	Japan	L	1–2	Pretinha	World Cup
June 9, 1995	Germany	L	1–6	Roseli	World Cup

The Brazil women's national football team competed in the following competitions in 1995:

Competition	Performance
Sudamericano Femenino	Champions
World Cup	Group stage

=== Domestic competition champions ===
Competition	Champion
Campeonato Brasileiro	Vasco
Campeonato Carioca	Vasco
