= Copa Tocantins =

- Organising body: Federação Tocantinense de Futebol
- Founded: 1993
- Abolished: 1998
- Region: Tocantins, Brazil
- Qualifier for: Campeonato Brasileiro Série C, Copa do Brasil
- Related competitions: Campeonato Tocantinense
- Most successful club(s): Kaburé (3 title)

The Copa Tocantins (English: Tocantins State Cup) is a tournament organized by Federação Tocantinense de Futebol in order to decide how club would be the representative of the state at Campeonato Brasileiro Série C and Copa do Brasil.

== List of champions ==
Season	Champions	Runners-up
1993	Kaburé	Intercap
1994	Kaburé	Tocantinópolis
1995	União Araguainense	Gurupi
1996	Kaburé	Tocantinópolis
1997	Alvorada	Tocantinópolis
1998	Interporto	Unknown
