= 1994 Campeonato Brasileiro Série A =

Campeonato Brasileiro Série A
- Season: 1994
- Champions: Palmeiras (8th title)
- Relegated: Remo; Náutico
- Copa Libertadores: Palmeiras; Grêmio (via Copa do Brasil)
- Matches: 310
- Goals: 744 (2.4 per match)
- Top goalscorer: Amoroso; Túlio (19 goals each)

The 1994 Campeonato Brasileiro Série A was the 38th edition of the Campeonato Brasileiro Série A.

== Overview ==
The Palmeiras won the championship. Relegated: Remo and Nautico.

== First stage ==
=== Group A ===
Pos	Team	Pld	W	D	L	GF	GA	GD	Pts	
1	Corinthians	10	5	3	2	18	14	+4	13	Qualified to second stage, earned a bonus point
2	Flamengo	10	4	4	2	16	11	+5	12	Qualified to second stage
3	Grêmio	10	4	4	2	12	9	+3	12	Qualified to second stage
4	Sport	10	3	4	3	11	16	−5	10	Qualified to second stage
5	Criciúma	10	2	5	3	14	11	+3	9	Relegation league
6	Bragantino	10	1	2	7	8	18	−10	4	Relegation league

Source: https://www.rsssfbrasil.com/tablesae/br1994.htm

=== Group B ===
Pos	Team	Pld	W	D	L	GF	GA	GD	Pts	
1	Botafogo	10	5	2	3	16	12	+4	12	Qualified to second stage, earned a bonus point
2	Paysandu	10	5	2	3	14	13	+1	12	Qualified to second stage
3	São Paulo	10	3	5	2	11	10	+1	11	Qualified to second stage
4	Portuguesa	10	2	6	2	4	4	0	10	Qualified to second stage
5	Atlético Mineiro	10	2	4	4	8	10	−2	8	Relegation league
6	Vitória	10	1	5	4	9	13	−4	7	Relegation league

Source: https://www.rsssfbrasil.com/tablesae/br1994.htm

=== Group C ===
Pos	Team	Pld	W	D	L	GF	GA	GD	Pts	
1	Guarani	10	7	1	2	17	7	+10	15	Qualified to second stage, earned a bonus point
2	Santos	10	6	2	2	16	8	+8	14	Qualified to second stage
3	Vasco da Gama	10	4	3	3	12	9	+3	11	Qualified to second stage
4	Bahia	10	4	3	3	11	13	−2	11	Qualified to second stage
5	Remo	10	2	1	7	5	15	−10	5	Relegation league
6	Cruzeiro	10	1	2	7	7	16	−9	4	Relegation league

Source: https://www.rsssfbrasil.com/tablesae/br1994.htm

=== Group D ===
Pos	Team	Pld	W	D	L	GF	GA	GD	Pts	
1	Palmeiras	10	9	1	0	26	7	+19	19	Qualified to second stage, earned a bonus point
2	Fluminense	10	4	2	4	14	15	−1	10	Qualified to second stage
3	Paraná	10	3	3	4	15	18	−3	9	Qualified to second stage
4	Internacional	10	3	2	5	14	13	+1	8	Qualified to second stage
5	União São João	10	3	2	5	10	14	−4	8	Relegation league
6	Náutico	10	1	4	5	7	19	−12	6	Relegation league

Source: https://www.rsssfbrasil.com/tablesae/br1994.htm

== Second stage ==
=== First round ===
==== Group E ====
Pos	Team	Pld	W	D	L	GF	GA	GD	Pts	
1	Corinthians	7	5	1	1	13	6	+7	12	Qualified to quarterfinals
2	Guarani	7	4	3	0	11	6	+5	12	
3	Grêmio	7	3	1	3	9	9	0	7	
4	Internacional	7	2	3	2	9	10	−1	7	
5	Paysandu	7	2	2	3	6	8	−2	6	
6	Vasco da Gama	7	2	1	4	7	9	−2	5	
7	Portuguesa	7	2	1	4	6	8	−2	5	
8	Fluminense	7	1	2	4	7	12	−5	4	

Source: https://www.rsssfbrasil.com/tablesae/br1994.htm

==== Group F ====
Pos	Team	Pld	W	D	L	GF	GA	GD	Pts	
1	Palmeiras	7	4	2	1	8	5	+3	11	Qualified to quarterfinals
2	Sport	7	4	2	1	15	8	+7	10	
3	São Paulo	7	3	3	1	14	12	+2	9	
4	Bahia	7	2	4	1	9	8	+1	8	
5	Santos	7	2	2	3	10	11	−1	6	
6	Botafogo	7	2	1	4	7	12	−5	6	
7	Flamengo	7	1	2	4	3	7	−4	4	
8	Paraná	7	0	4	3	5	8	−3	4	

Source: https://www.rsssfbrasil.com/tablesae/br1994.htm

=== Second round ===
==== Group E ====
Pos	Team	Pld	W	D	L	GF	GA	GD	Pts	
1	Guarani	8	5	2	1	11	5	+6	12	Qualified to quarterfinals
2	Portuguesa	8	5	1	2	16	8	+8	11	
3	Fluminense	8	3	2	3	14	13	+1	8	
4	Vasco da Gama	8	2	4	2	4	7	−3	8	
5	Internacional	8	2	3	3	4	5	−1	7	
6	Grêmio	8	2	1	5	6	12	−6	5	
7	Paysandu	8	1	2	5	2	11	−9	4	
8	Corinthians	8	1	2	5	6	16	−10	4	

Source: https://www.rsssfbrasil.com/tablesae/br1994.htm

==== Group F ====
Pos	Team	Pld	W	D	L	GF	GA	GD	Pts	
1	Botafogo	8	5	3	0	13	5	+8	13	Qualified to quarterfinals
2	Santos	8	5	1	2	10	3	+7	11	
3	São Paulo	8	5	0	3	14	9	+5	10	
4	Bahia	8	3	4	1	10	6	+4	10	
5	Paraná	8	3	2	3	9	9	0	8	
6	Flamengo	8	2	3	3	5	9	−4	7	
7	Palmeiras	8	2	2	4	11	12	−1	6	
8	Sport	8	1	2	5	5	10	−5	4	

Source: https://www.rsssfbrasil.com/tablesae/br1994.htm

=== Second stage overall ===
Pos	Team	Pld	W	D	L	GF	GA	GD	Pts	
1	Guarani	15	9	5	1	22	11	+11	24	Qualified – Round Winner
2	São Paulo	15	8	3	4	28	21	+7	19	Qualified – Overall
3	Botafogo	15	7	4	4	20	17	+3	19	Qualified – Round Winner
4	Bahia	15	5	8	2	19	14	+5	18	Qualified – Overall
5	Santos	15	7	3	5	20	14	+6	17	
6	Palmeiras	15	6	4	5	19	17	+2	17	Qualified – Round Winner
7	Portuguesa	15	7	2	6	22	16	+6	16	
8	Corinthians	15	6	3	6	19	22	−3	16	Qualified – Round Winner
9	Sport	15	5	4	6	20	18	+2	14	
10	Internacional	15	4	6	5	13	15	−2	14	
11	Vasco da Gama	15	4	5	6	11	16	−5	13	
12	Grêmio	15	5	2	8	15	21	−6	12	
13	Fluminense	15	4	4	7	21	25	−4	12	
14	Paraná	15	3	6	6	14	17	−3	12	
15	Flamengo	15	3	5	7	8	16	−8	11	
16	Paysandu	15	3	4	8	8	19	−11	10	

Source: https://www.rsssfbrasil.com/tablesae/br1994.htm

== Relegation league ==
Pos	Team	Pld	W	D	L	GF	GA	GD	Pts	
1	Bragantino	14	7	5	2	20	10	+10	19	Qualified to quarterfinals
2	Atlético Mineiro	14	7	4	3	22	13	+9	18	Qualified to quarterfinals
3	Vitória	14	6	3	5	16	15	+1	15	
4	Criciúma	14	5	4	5	20	23	−3	14	
5	União São João	14	4	5	5	16	18	−2	13	
6	Cruzeiro	14	5	2	7	15	19	−4	12	
7	Remo	14	4	4	6	13	19	−6	12	Relegation to Série B 1995
8	Náutico	14	4	1	9	9	14	−5	9	Relegation to Série B 1995

Source: https://www.rsssfbrasil.com/tablesae/br1994.htm

== Final standings ==
Pos	Team	Pld	W	D	L	GF	GA	GD	Pts	Qualification or relegation
1	Palmeiras (C)	31	20	6	5	58	30	+28	46	Copa Libertadores 1995
2	Corinthians	31	12	9	10	43	44	−1	33	1995 Copa CONMEBOL
3	Guarani	29	17	6	6	45	26	+19	40	1995 Copa CONMEBOL
4	Atlético Mineiro	28	11	8	9	36	28	+8	30	1995 Copa CONMEBOL
5	Botafogo	27	13	6	8	38	32	+6	32	Quarterfinalists
6	São Paulo	27	12	8	7	42	35	+7	32	Quarterfinalists
7	Bahia	27	9	11	7	32	31	+1	29	Quarterfinalists
8	Bragantino	26	8	9	9	29	29	0	25	Quarterfinalists
9	Santos	25	13	5	7	36	22	+14	31	
10	Portuguesa	25	9	8	8	26	20	+6	26	
11	Grêmio	25	9	6	10	27	30	−3	24	Copa Libertadores 1995
12	Vasco da Gama	25	8	8	9	23	25	−2	24	
13	Sport	25	8	8	9	31	34	−3	24	
14	Flamengo	25	7	9	9	24	27	−3	23	
15	Fluminense	25	8	6	11	35	40	−5	22	
16	Paysandu	25	8	6	11	22	32	−10	22	
17	Internacional	25	7	8	10	27	28	−1	22	
18	Paraná	25	6	9	10	29	35	−6	21	
19	Vitória	24	7	8	9	25	28	−3	22	Relegation League
20	Criciúma	24	7	9	8	34	34	0	23	Relegation League
21	União São João	24	7	7	10	26	32	−6	21	Relegation League
22	Cruzeiro	24	6	4	14	22	35	−13	16	Relegation League
23	Remo (R)	24	6	5	13	18	34	−16	17	Relegation to Série B 1995
24	Náutico (R)	24	5	5	14	16	33	−17	15	Relegation to Série B 1995

(C) Champions; (R) Relegated

=== Final stage ===
Quarterfinals
1F	Palmeiras	2	2
2O	Bahia	1	1
2E	Guarani	0	4
1O	São Paulo	1	2
1E	Corinthians*	1	0
1R	Bragantino	1	0
2F	Botafogo	0	2
2R	Atlético Mineiro	2	1

Semifinals
Palmeiras	3	2
Guarani	1	1
Corinthians*	2	1
Atlético Mineiro	3	0

Finals
Palmeiras	3	1
Corinthians	1	1

*Corinthians qualified due to better record.

Campeonato Brasileiro de Clubes da Série A
1994 champions

8th title

=== Final ===
15 December 1994
16:00

Corinthians	1 − 3	Palmeiras
Marques 67'		Rivaldo 45', 63'; Edmundo 65'

Pacaembu Stadium, São Paulo
Attendance: 36,409
Referee: Antônio Pereira da Silva

18 December 1994
16:00

Palmeiras	1 − 1	Corinthians
Rivaldo 81'		Marques 3'

Pacaembu Stadium, São Paulo
Attendance: 35,217
Referee: Márcio Rezende de Freitas

== Top scorers ==
Pos.	Scorer	Club	Goals
1	(Brazil) Amoroso	Guarani	19
1	(Brazil) Túlio	Botafogo	19
2	(Brazil) Rivaldo	Palmeiras	14
2	(Brazil) Evair	Palmeiras	14
2	(Brazil) Ézio	Fluminense	14
3	(Brazil) Reinaldo	Atlético Mineiro	13
