= Marcelo Mabilia =

Brazilian football manager and former player

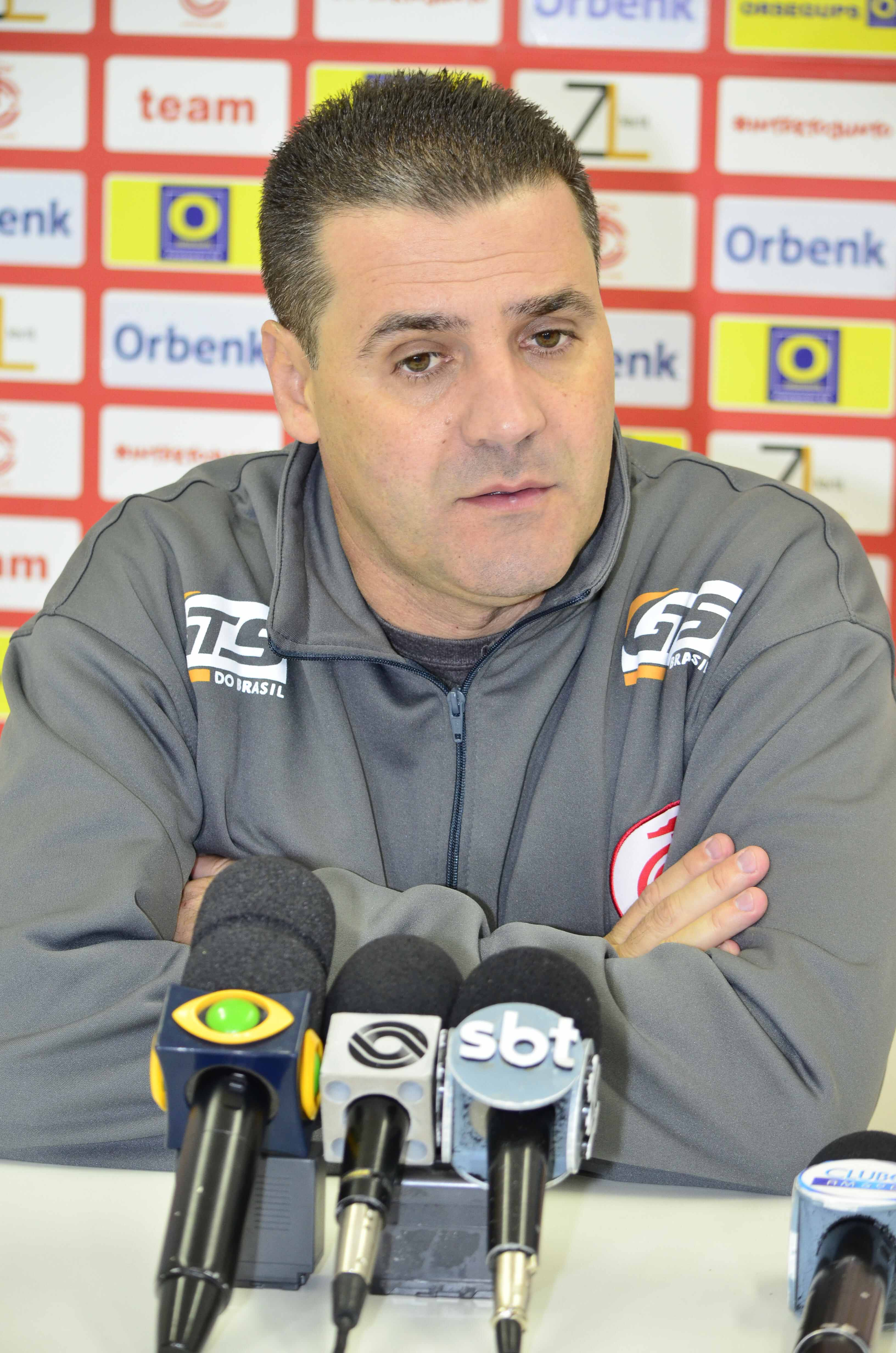

Personal information
- Full name: Marcelo Mabilia
- Date of birth: October 31, 1972 (age 53)
- Place of birth: Porto Alegre (RS); Brazil
- Height: 1.83 m (6 ft 0 in)
- Position: Forward

Senior career*
Years	Team	Apps	(Gls)
1991–1993	Grêmio		
1993	Internacional		
1994	Mogi Mirim		
1994	Fluminense		
1995	Ypiranga		
1996	Tubarão		
1996	Criciúma		
1997	Júbilo Iwata		
1997–1998	Internacional		
1999–2000	Juventude		
2000	Guarani		
2001	Coritiba		
2001	Juventude		
2002	Figueirense		
2003	Náutico		
2004	Ulbra		

Managerial career
- 2007: Mogi Mirim (U-20)
- 2007: São Caetano (U-20)
- 2011–2012: Novo Hamburgo (U-20)
- 2012–2014: Grêmio (U-20)
- 2014: Novo Hamburgo
- 2015: Inter de Lages
- 2015: Tombense
- 2016–: Atlético Tubarão
- * Club domestic league appearances and goals

Marcelo Mabilia, or simply Mabilia (born October 31, 1972, in Porto Alegre), is a Brazilian football manager and former forward.

== Club statistics ==
Club performance			League		Cup		League Cup		Total	
Season	Club	League	Apps	Goals	Apps	Goals	Apps	Goals	Apps	Goals
Japan			League		Emperor's Cup		J.League Cup		Total	
1997	Júbilo Iwata	J1 League	10	3	0	0	4	1	14	4
Total			10	3	0	0	4	1	14	4

== Honours ==
Júbilo Iwata

- J1 League: 1997

Juventude

- Copa do Brasil: 1999
