= 1997 Copa do Brasil =

Copa do Brasil 1997

Tournament details
- Country: Brazil
- Dates: February 18 – May 22
- Teams: 45

Final positions
- Champions: Grêmio (RS)
- Runners-up: Flamengo (RJ)

Tournament statistics
- Matches played: 78
- Goals scored: 267 (3.42 per match)
- Top goal scorer: Paulo Nunes (8)

The Copa do Brasil 1997 was the 9th staging of the Copa do Brasil.

The competition started on February 18, 1997, and concluded on May 22, 1997, with the second leg of the final, held at the Estádio do Maracanã in Rio de Janeiro, in which Grêmio lifted the trophy for the third time after a 2-2 draw with Flamengo.

Paulo Nunes, of Grêmio, with 9 goals, was the competition's topscorer.

== Format ==
The preliminary round was disputed by 26 clubs, while the first stage was disputed by 32 clubs, including the ones qualified from the preliminary stage. The competition was disputed in a knock-out format. In the preliminary stage and in the first round if the away team won the first leg with an advantage of at least two goals, the second leg was not played and the club automatically qualified to the next round. The following rounds were played over two legs and the away goals rule was used.

== Competition stages ==
=== Preliminary round ===
Team 1	Agg.	Team 2	1st leg	2nd leg
Bacabal (MA)	WO	Fortaleza (CE)	WO	-
Guará (DF)	0-7	Internacional (RS)	0-7	-
Mixto (MT)	0-3	Corinthians (SP)	0-3	-
Ypiranga (AP)	1-5	Remo (PA)	1-0	0-5
CSA (AL)	2-6	Atlético (PR)	2-6	-
Operário (MS)	3-8	Santa Cruz (PE)	2-2	1-6
Desportiva (ES)	2-6	Santos (SP)	1-1	1-5
Paysandu (PA)	2-4	Vila Nova (GO)	2-1	0-3
Santa Cruz (PB)	0-4	Fluminense (RJ)	0-4	-
Rio Branco (AC)	4-3	Baré (RR)	3-2	1-1
Kaburé (TO)	1-9	Portuguesa (SP)	1-1	0-8
Ji-Paraná (RO)	1-3	Botafogo (RJ)	1-3	-
América (MG)	1-3	Bahia (BA)	1-1	0-2

=== Knockout stages ===
1st Round
1	Sergipe (SE)	3
32	Vasco (RJ)	5
17	Atlético (PR)	3 1
16	Sport (PE)	0 1
9	Corinthians (SP)	2 0 (pen: 5)
24	Juventude (RS)	0 2 (pen: 3)
25	Remo (PA)	3 2
8	Atlético (MG)	3 3
5	América (RN)	1 0
28	Portuguesa (SP)	0 3
21	Fortaleza (CE)	2 1
12	Grêmio (RS)	3 3
13	Botafogo (RJ)	0
20	Vitória (BA)	3
29	Vila Nova (GO)	2 0
4	São Paulo (SP)	3 2
3	Figueirense (SC)	0 2
30	Santos (SP)	1 3
19	Paraná (PR)	1 0
14	Internacional (RS)	1 3
11	Nacional (AM)	2
22	Flamengo (RJ)	6
27	Rio Branco (AC)	1 1
6	Goiás (GO)	0 2
7	Bahia (BA))	2 0
26	Coritiba (PR)	2 1
23	River (PI)	0 1
10	Palmeiras (SP)	0 7
15	Ceará (CE)	1 0
18	Fluminense (RJ)	0 0
31	Santa Cruz (PE)	1 1
2	Cruzeiro (MG)	1 0

2nd Round
Vasco (RJ)	1 3
Atlético (PR)	3 4
Corinthians (SP)	1 1
Atlético (MG)	0 1
Portuguesa (SP)	1 1
Grêmio (RS)	2 1
Vitória (BA)	2 2
São Paulo (SP)	1 2
Santos (SP)	2 0 (pen: 2)
Internacional (RS)	0 2 (pen: 3)
Flamengo (RJ)	1 5
Rio Branco (AC)	2 1
Coritiba (PR)	0 2
Palmeiras (SP)	1 4
Ceará (CE)	3 1
Santa Cruz (PE)	2 0

Quarterfinals
Atlético (PR)	2 2
Corinthians (SP)	1 6
Grêmio (RS)	2 3
Vitória (BA)	0 3
Internacional (RS)	1 0
Flamengo (RJ)	1 1
Palmeiras (SP)	5 5
Ceará (CE)	2 0

Semifinals
Corinthians (SP)	1 1
Grêmio (RS)	2 1
Flamengo (RJ)	2 1
Palmeiras (SP)	0 0

Finals
Grêmio (RS)	0 2
Flamengo (RJ)	0 2

Copa do Brasil
1997 Winners
Grêmio
Third Title
