= 1995 Campeonato Brasileiro Série C =

Campeonato Brasileiro Série C
- Season: 1995
- Champions: XV de Piracicaba
- Promoted: XV de Piracicaba; Volta Redonda; Atlético-GO; Gama; Joinville; ABC
- Biggest home win: Lousano Paulista 7-0 Bayer (October 1, 1995)
- Biggest away win: Bayer 0-5 Lousano Paulista (September 4, 1996)
- Highest scoring: Sete de Setembro 4-5 CSA (September 10, 1995)

The Campeonato Brasileiro Série C 1995 was a football (soccer) series played from August 27 to December 10th, 1995. It was the third level of the Brazilian National League. The competition had 108 clubs, the largest number before or since (as of writing in 2014), and two of them were originally promoted to Série B. However, with the withdrawal of five teams after the 1995 Série B, the 3rd to 6th placed teams in the 1995 Série C were promoted to the 1996 Série B.

== First phase ==
=== Group 1 ===
Pos	Team	Pld	W	D	L	GF	GA	GD	Pts	Qualification
1	(Paraná (state)) Matsubara	4	3	1	0	7	0	+7	10	Qualified for the second phase
2	(Paraná (state)) União Bandeirante	4	2	1	1	3	2	+1	7	Qualified for the second phase
3	(Santa Catarina (state)) Caçadorense	4	0	0	4	1	9	−8	0	

Source: rsssfbrasil.com

=== Group 2 ===
Pos	Team	Pld	W	D	L	GF	GA	GD	Pts	Qualification
1	(Espírito Santo) Vitória-ES	6	3	2	1	5	2	+3	11	Qualified for the second phase
2	(Espírito Santo) Linhares	6	3	2	1	7	5	+2	11	Qualified for the second phase
3	(Rio de Janeiro (state)) Itaperuna	6	1	2	3	5	7	−2	5	
4	(Espírito Santo) São Mateus	6	0	4	2	5	8	−3	4	

Source: rsssfbrasil.com

=== Group 3 ===
Pos	Team	Pld	W	D	L	GF	GA	GD	Pts	Qualification
1	(Minas Gerais) Valeriodoce	6	3	1	2	7	5	+2	10	Qualified for the second phase
2	(São Paulo (state)) Inter de Limeira	6	3	1	2	7	6	+1	10	Qualified for the second phase
3	(Minas Gerais) Villa Nova	6	3	0	3	8	8	0	9	
4	(São Paulo (state)) Rio Branco-SP	6	2	0	4	6	9	−3	6	

Source: rsssfbrasil.com

=== Group 4 ===
Pos	Team	Pld	W	D	L	GF	GA	GD	Pts	Qualification
1	(Minas Gerais) Uberlândia	6	4	1	1	10	5	+5	13	Qualified for the second phase
2	(São Paulo (state)) Botafogo-SP	6	2	4	0	5	3	+2	10	Qualified for the second phase
3	(Minas Gerais) URT	6	2	2	2	8	7	+1	8	
4	(São Paulo (state)) Mirassol	6	0	1	5	2	10	−8	1	

Source: rsssfbrasil.com

=== Group 5 ===
Pos	Team	Pld	W	D	L	GF	GA	GD	Pts	Qualification
1	(Rio de Janeiro (state)) Volta Redonda	4	3	0	1	4	1	+3	9	Qualified for the second phase
2	(Rio de Janeiro (state)) Bayer	4	2	0	2	3	4	−1	6	Qualified for the second phase
3	(São Paulo (state)) Nacional-SP	4	1	0	3	3	5	−2	3	

Source: rsssfbrasil.com

=== Group 6 ===
Pos	Team	Pld	W	D	L	GF	GA	GD	Pts	Qualification
1	(Rio de Janeiro (state)) Barra	6	3	1	2	6	3	+3	10	Qualified for the second phase
2	(Espírito Santo) Rio Branco-ES	6	3	0	3	6	8	−2	9	Qualified for the second phase
3	(Espírito Santo) Estrela do Norte	6	2	3	1	7	5	+2	9	
4	(Rio de Janeiro (state)) Campo Grande	6	1	2	3	3	6	−3	5	

Source: rsssfbrasil.com

=== Group 7 ===
Pos	Team	Pld	W	D	L	GF	GA	GD	Pts	Qualification
1	(Tocantins) Intercap	4	2	1	1	2	1	+1	7	Qualified for the second phase
2	(Tocantins) Gurupi	4	2	0	2	4	3	+1	6	Qualified for the second phase
3	(Tocantins) Kaburé	4	1	1	2	2	4	−2	4	

Source: rsssfbrasil.com

=== Group 8 ===
Pos	Team	Pld	W	D	L	GF	GA	GD	Pts	Qualification
1	(Federal District (Brazil)) Gama	6	3	2	1	5	1	+4	11	Qualified for the second phase
2	(Goiás) Caldas	6	3	0	3	5	7	−2	9	Qualified for the second phase
3	(Federal District (Brazil)) Planaltina	6	1	3	2	5	6	−1	6	
4	(Goiás) Itumbiara	6	1	3	2	3	4	−1	6	

Source: rsssfbrasil.com

=== Group 9 ===
Pos	Team	Pld	W	D	L	GF	GA	GD	Pts	Qualification
1	(Goiás) Anápolis	6	4	1	1	9	3	+6	13	Qualified for the second phase
2	(Goiás) Vila Nova	6	3	2	1	6	3	+3	11	Qualified for the second phase
3	(Federal District (Brazil)) Ceilandense	6	3	0	3	9	7	+2	9	
4	(Federal District (Brazil)) Tiradentes-DF	6	0	1	5	3	14	−11	1	

Source: rsssfbrasil.com

=== Group 10 ===
Pos	Team	Pld	W	D	L	GF	GA	GD	Pts	Qualification
1	(Goiás) Atlético-GO	6	4	1	1	10	5	+5	13	Qualified for the second phase
2	(Federal District (Brazil)) Guará	6	4	0	2	8	4	+4	12	Qualified for the second phase
3	(Federal District (Brazil)) Brasília	6	2	0	4	5	9	−4	6	
4	(Goiás) Rio Verde	6	1	1	4	5	10	−5	4	

Source: rsssfbrasil.com

=== Group 11 ===
Pos	Team	Pld	W	D	L	GF	GA	GD	Pts	Qualification
1	(Ceará) Fortaleza	6	4	2	0	11	3	+8	14	Qualified for the second phase
2	(Ceará) Ferroviário	6	3	1	2	12	7	+5	10	Qualified for the second phase
3	(Rio Grande do Norte) Potiguar de Mossoró	6	2	2	2	7	9	−2	8	
4	(Rio Grande do Norte) Alecrim	6	0	1	5	0	11	−11	1	

Source: rsssfbrasil.com

=== Group 12 ===
Pos	Team	Pld	W	D	L	GF	GA	GD	Pts	Qualification
1	(Rio Grande do Norte) ABC	5	3	1	1	6	2	+4	10	Qualified for the second phase
2	(Paraíba) Santa Cruz-PB	5	3	1	1	7	4	+3	10	Qualified for the second phase
3	(Rio Grande do Norte) Coríntians-RN	5	1	2	2	5	7	−2	5	
4	(Paraíba) Botafogo-PB	5	0	2	3	2	7	−5	2	

Source: rsssfbrasil.com

Note: The two last matches of the group were cancelled for unknown reasons.

=== Group 13 ===
Pos	Team	Pld	W	D	L	GF	GA	GD	Pts	Qualification
1	(Pernambuco) Vitória-PE	6	3	2	1	11	7	+4	11	Qualified for the second phase
2	(Alagoas) CSA	6	3	2	1	11	8	+3	11	Qualified for the second phase
3	(Pernambuco) Porto	6	2	1	3	8	10	−2	7	
4	(Alagoas) Sete de Setembro-AL	6	0	3	3	9	14	−5	3	

Source: rsssfbrasil.com

=== Group 14 ===
Pos	Team	Pld	W	D	L	GF	GA	GD	Pts	Qualification
1	(Acre (state)) Rio Branco-AC	6	4	2	0	11	3	+8	14	Qualified for the second phase
2	(Acre (state)) Independência	6	3	2	1	8	5	+3	11	Qualified for the second phase
3	(Acre (state)) Vasco da Gama-AC	6	2	1	3	7	6	+1	7	
4	(Acre (state)) Atlético Acreano	6	0	1	5	2	14	−12	1	

Source: rsssfbrasil.com

=== Group 15 ===
Pos	Team	Pld	W	D	L	GF	GA	GD	Pts	Qualification
1	(Sergipe) Itabaiana	6	3	2	1	13	7	+6	11	Qualified for the second phase
2	(Bahia) Galícia	6	3	2	1	5	2	+3	11	Qualified for the second phase
3	(Bahia) Fluminense de Feira	6	3	1	2	6	6	0	10	
4	(Sergipe) Maruinense	6	0	1	5	2	11	−9	1	

Source: rsssfbrasil.com

=== Group 16 ===
Pos	Team	Pld	W	D	L	GF	GA	GD	Pts	Qualification
1	(Tocantins) União Araguainense	4	1	3	0	4	2	+2	6	Qualified for the second phase
2	(Maranhão) Imperatriz	4	1	2	1	3	8	−5	5	Qualified for the second phase
3	(Maranhão) Bacabal	4	1	1	2	8	5	+3	4	

Source: rsssfbrasil.com

=== Group 17 ===
Pos	Team	Pld	W	D	L	GF	GA	GD	Pts	Qualification
1	(Bahia) Catuense	4	2	1	1	5	4	+1	7	Qualified for the second phase
2	(Alagoas) Batalhense	4	1	2	1	6	6	0	5	Qualified for the second phase
3	(Sergipe) Confiança	4	0	3	1	6	7	−1	3	

Source: rsssfbrasil.com

=== Group 18 ===
Pos	Team	Pld	W	D	L	GF	GA	GD	Pts	Qualification
1	(Paraíba) Sousa	4	3	0	1	7	5	+2	9	Qualified for the second phase
2	(Ceará) Icasa	4	1	1	2	6	7	−1	4	Qualified for the second phase
3	(Pernambuco) Ypiranga-PE	4	1	1	2	6	7	−1	4	

Source: rsssfbrasil.com

=== Group 19 ===
Pos	Team	Pld	W	D	L	GF	GA	GD	Pts	Qualification
1	(Maranhão) Sampaio Corrêa	4	2	2	0	4	2	+2	8	Qualified for the second phase
2	(Piauí) Flamengo-PI	4	1	2	1	1	1	0	5	Qualified for the second phase
3	(Maranhão) Duque de Caxias	4	0	2	2	2	4	−2	2	

Source: rsssfbrasil.com

=== Group 20 ===
Pos	Team	Pld	W	D	L	GF	GA	GD	Pts	Qualification
1	(Maranhão) Coroatá	4	3	1	0	7	2	+5	10	Qualified for the second phase
2	(Piauí) Picos	4	1	2	1	2	3	−1	5	Qualified for the second phase
3	(Piauí) Cori-Sabbá	4	0	1	3	1	5	−4	1	

Source: rsssfbrasil.com

=== Group 21 ===
Pos	Team	Pld	W	D	L	GF	GA	GD	Pts	Qualification
1	Atlético Roraima	4	1	3	0	6	3	+3	6	Qualified for the second phase
2	(Roraima) Baré	4	1	2	1	4	4	0	5	Qualified for the second phase
3	(Roraima) Progresso	4	1	1	2	5	8	−3	4	

Source: rsssfbrasil.com

=== Group 22 ===
Pos	Team	Pld	W	D	L	GF	GA	GD	Pts	Qualification
1	(Amazonas (Brazilian state)) Rio Negro	4	4	0	0	6	1	+5	12	Qualified for the second phase
2	(Amazonas (Brazilian state)) Nacional-AM	4	1	1	2	4	5	−1	4	Qualified for the second phase
3	(Amazonas (Brazilian state)) Fast	4	0	1	3	1	5	−4	1	

Source: rsssfbrasil.com

=== Group 23 ===
Pos	Team	Pld	W	D	L	GF	GA	GD	Pts	Qualification
1	(Rondônia) Ji-Paraná	4	2	2	0	10	4	+6	8	Qualified for the second phase
2	(Rondônia) Ariquemes	4	2	2	0	5	2	+3	8	Qualified for the second phase
3	(Acre (state)) Andirá	4	0	0	4	2	11	−9	0	

Source: rsssfbrasil.com

=== Group 24 ===
Pos	Team	Pld	W	D	L	GF	GA	GD	Pts	Qualification
1	(Mato Grosso) Operário-MT	2	1	1	0	3	2	+1	4	Qualified for the second phase
2	(Mato Grosso) União Rondonópolis	2	0	1	1	2	3	−1	1	Qualified for the second phase
3	(Mato Grosso) Sinop	0	0	0	0	0	0	0	0	Withdrew

Source: rsssfbrasil.com

=== Group 25 ===
Pos	Team	Pld	W	D	L	GF	GA	GD	Pts	Qualification
1	(Rio de Janeiro (state)) América-RJ	4	2	1	1	5	6	−1	7	Qualified for the second phase
2	(São Paulo (state)) Francana	4	2	0	2	8	5	+3	6	Qualified for the second phase
3	(Minas Gerais) Caldense	4	1	1	2	6	8	−2	4	

Source: rsssfbrasil.com

=== Group 26 ===
Pos	Team	Pld	W	D	L	GF	GA	GD	Pts	Qualification
1	(São Paulo (state)) Araçatuba	4	2	1	1	3	3	0	7	Qualified for the second phase
2	(São Paulo (state)) Marília	4	2	0	2	5	3	+2	6	Qualified for the second phase
3	(Mato Grosso do Sul) Taveirópolis	4	1	1	2	3	5	−2	4	

Source: rsssfbrasil.com

=== Group 27 ===
Pos	Team	Pld	W	D	L	GF	GA	GD	Pts	Qualification
1	(São Paulo (state)) Santo André	4	2	0	2	4	4	0	6	Qualified for the second phase
2	(Santa Catarina (state)) Juventus-SC	4	1	2	1	5	4	+1	5	Qualified for the second phase
3	(São Paulo (state)) Ituano	4	1	2	1	3	4	−1	5	

Source: rsssfbrasil.com

=== Group 28 ===
Pos	Team	Pld	W	D	L	GF	GA	GD	Pts	Qualification
1	(Santa Catarina (state)) Avaí	4	2	1	1	6	4	+2	7	Qualified for the second phase
2	(Santa Catarina (state)) Joinville	4	2	0	2	6	5	+1	6	Qualified for the second phase
3	(São Paulo (state)) Atlético Sorocaba	4	1	1	2	2	5	−3	4	

Source: rsssfbrasil.com

=== Group 29 ===
Pos	Team	Pld	W	D	L	GF	GA	GD	Pts	Qualification
1	(São Paulo (state)) Lousano Paulista	4	3	1	0	10	2	+8	10	Qualified for the second phase
2	(São Paulo (state)) XV de Piracicaba	4	1	1	2	4	4	0	4	Qualified for the second phase
3	(Minas Gerais) Democrata-SL	4	1	0	3	1	9	−8	3	

Source: rsssfbrasil.com

=== Group 30 ===
Pos	Team	Pld	W	D	L	GF	GA	GD	Pts	Qualification
1	(Rio Grande do Sul) Ypiranga-RS	4	2	1	1	10	5	+5	7	Qualified for the second phase
2	(Santa Catarina (state)) Chapecoense	4	2	1	1	6	4	+2	7	Qualified for the second phase
3	(Paraná (state)) Cascavel	4	1	0	3	1	8	−7	3	

Source: rsssfbrasil.com

=== Group 31 ===
Pos	Team	Pld	W	D	L	GF	GA	GD	Pts	Qualification
1	(Rio Grande do Sul) Caxias	4	2	1	1	6	2	+4	7	Qualified for the second phase
2	(Rio Grande do Sul) Brasil de Pelotas	4	2	1	1	4	5	−1	7	Qualified for the second phase
3	(Rio Grande do Sul) Pelotas	4	0	2	2	3	6	−3	2	

Source: rsssfbrasil.com

=== Group 32 ===
Pos	Team	Pld	W	D	L	GF	GA	GD	Pts	Qualification
1	(Paraná (state)) Batel	4	2	0	2	7	5	+2	6	Qualified for the second phase
2	(Santa Catarina (state)) Figueirense	4	1	2	1	5	5	0	5	Qualified for the second phase
3	(Santa Catarina (state)) Marcílio Dias	4	1	2	1	2	4	−2	5	

Source: rsssfbrasil.com

== Second phase ==
Team 1	Agg.	Team 2	1st leg	2nd leg
Nacional	4–0	Atlético Roraima	4–0	0–0
Intercap	5–1	Imperatriz	4–0	1–1
Flamengo-PI	3–2	Coroatá	2–0	1–1
Sampaio Corrêa	0–1	Picos	0–0	0–1
Ariquemes	2–2(a)	Ji-Paraná	2–2	0–0
Figueirense	2–5	Brasil de Pelotas	1-3	1–2
Caxias	4–1	Avaí	2–0	2–1
Ypiranga-RS	1–4	Juventus-SC	1–2	0–2
Batel	1–2	Chapecoense	0–0	1–2
Joinville	4–3	União Bandeirante	4–1	0–2
Matsubara	2–3	Araçatuba	1–1	1–2
Marília	3–2	Anápolis	2–2	1–0
Gurupi	3–4	Guará	3–1	0–3
União Rondonópolis	3–4	Vila Nova	3–2	0–2
Gama	6–1	União Araguainense	5–0	1–1
Atlético-GO	4–4(a)	Operário-MT	2–0	2–4
Caldas	1–5	Uberlândia	1–2	0–3
Linhares	2–2(p)	Valeriodoce	1–1	1–1
Barra	2–2(a)	Vitória-ES	0–0	2–2
Rio Branco-ES	1–1(p)	América-RJ	1–0	0–1
Bayer	0–12	Lousano Paulista	0–5	0–7
Santo André	1–3	Volta Redonda	1–1	0–2
XV de Piracicaba	1–0	Inter de Limeira	1–0	0–0
Botafogo-SP	3–2	Francana	2–0	1–2
Batalhense	2–6	Galícia	1–0	1–6
Catuense	3–2	Itabaiana	1–0	2–2
Sousa	2–1	CSA	0–0	2–1
Vitória-PE	1–1(p)	Icasa	1–0	0–1
Santa Cruz-PB	3–4	Fortaleza	2–2	1–2
Ferroviário	4–4(a)	ABC	3–3	1–1
Independência	3–5	Rio Branco-AC	1–2	2–3
Baré	5–3	Rio Negro	2–0	3–3

== Third phase ==
Team 1	Agg.	Team 2	1st leg	2nd leg
Araçatuba	0–0	Atlético-GO	WO	0–0
Intercap	2–2(a)	Vila Nova	1–0	1–2
Lousano Paulista	3–4	Joinville	1–1	2–3
Volta Redonda	0–0(p)	Botafogo-SP	0–0	0–0
XV de Piracicaba	5–0	Barra	4–0	1–0
Brasil de Pelotas	3–1	Chapecoense	2–0	1–1
Juventus-SC	3–4	Caxias	2–2	1–2
Ji-Paraná	3–3(a)	Rio Branco-AC	1–1	2–2
Nacional	2–0	Baré	2–0	0–0
Fortaleza	3–0	Flamengo-PI	2–0	1–0
Picos	2–3	ABC	2–1	0–2
Icasa	2–1	Sousa	1–0	1–1
Marília	0–0(p)	Guará	0–0	0–0
Galícia	1–2	Rio Branco-ES	0–1	1–1
Linhares	2–1	Catuense	1–1	1–0
Gama	3–2	Uberlândia	1–0	2–2

== Round of 16 ==
Team 1	Agg.	Team 2	1st leg	2nd leg
Intercap	3–3(a)	Atlético-GO	2–2	1–1
Nacional-AM	0–1	Ji-Paraná	0–0	0–1
Linhares	2–3	Volta Redonda	1–1	1–2
Guará	2–2	Rio Branco-ES	2–2	0–0
Fortaleza	4–5	ABC	3–2	1–3
Icasa	1–3	Gama	1–1	0–2
Brasil de Pelotas	1–3	XV de Piracicaba	1–1	0–2
Caxias	1–5	Joinville	1–1	0–4

== Quarterfinals ==
Team 1	Agg.	Team 2	1st leg	2nd leg
Atlético-GO	2–1	Ji-Paraná	1–0	1–1
Rio Branco-ES	1–2	Volta Redonda	0–1	1–1
Gama	2–2(a)	ABC	1–0	1–2
Joinville	1–1(p)	XV de Piracicaba	1–0	0–1

== Semifinals ==
Team 1	Agg.	Team 2	1st leg	2nd leg
Atlético-GO	1–4	Volta Redonda	1–2	0–2
XV de Piracicaba	2–1	Gama	2–0	0–1

== Finals ==
Team 1	Agg.	Team 2	1st leg	2nd leg
XV de Piracicaba	3–0	Volta Redonda	2–0	1–0

== Sources ==
- "Brazil Third Level 1995". rsssfbrasil.com. Archived from the original on 2020-01-04.
