= Mário (footballer, born 1966) =

Brazilian footballer

Personal information
- Full name: Mário Carlos Moraes Soares
- Date of birth: 3 March 1966 (age 60)
- Place of birth: Maceió, Brazil
- Height: 1.81 m (5 ft 11 in)
- Position: Forward

Senior career*
Years	Team	Apps	(Gls)
1987–1989	Guarani		
1989–1990	Bragantino		
1991	Celta de Vigo	10	(2)
1991	Bragantino		
1991–1992	Dunakanyar-Vác		
1993	Náutico		
1994–1995	Juventude	39	(28)
- * Club domestic league appearances and goals as of 5 January 2024

Mário Carlos Moraes Soares (born 3 March 1966), simply known as Mário, or by nickname Mário Maguila, is a Brazilian former professional footballer who played as a forward.

== Career ==
In 1989 Mário was part of the Série B champion squad for Bragantino, and the following year he participated in the historic title of the 1990 Campeonato Paulista. Mário was also the top scorer and great highlight of Juventude, and become champion of Série B once again, in 1994. In this season, he scored 11 goals in the national competition, in addition to another 23 goals scored during the Campeonato Gaúcho. Mário also had spells at Guarani, Celta de Vigo, Dunakanyar-Vác FC and Náutico.

== Honours ==
Bragantino

- Campeonato Brasileiro Série B: 1989
- Campeonato Paulista: 1990

Juventude

- Campeonato Brasileiro Série B: 1994

Individual

- 1994 Campeonato Brasileiro Série B top scorer: 11 goals
