= Bayer Esporte Clube =

Bayer
- Full name: Bayer Esporte Clube
- Founded: June 1, 1962; 62 years ago
- Dissolved: 1995
- Ground: Estádio Bayer Esporte Clube, Belford Roxo, Rio de Janeiro state, Brazil
Home colors	Away colors

Bayer Esporte Clube, commonly known as Bayer, was a Brazilian football club based in Belford Roxo, Rio de Janeiro state.

== History ==
The club was founded on June 1, 1962. Bayer won the Campeonato Carioca Second Level in 1993. They competed in the Série C in 1995, when they were eliminated in the Second Stage by Lousano Paulista. The club finished as runner-up in the 1995 Campeonato Carioca Second Level, losing the competition to Barra Mansa, the club was supposedly to be promoted to the Campeonato Carioca, but the Rio de Janeiro State Football Federation canceled the promotion, and because of that, Bayer closed ints professional football department.

== Achievements ==
- Campeonato Carioca Série A2:
  - Winners (1): 1993

== Stadium ==
Bayer Esporte Clube played their home games at Estádio Bayer Esporte Clube.
