= Barra do Garças Futebol Clube =

Barra do Garças
- Full name: Barra do Garças Futebol Clube
- Nickname(s): Galo da Serra
- Founded: 5 May 1978
- Dissolved: 16 July 2014; 10 years ago
- Ground: Estádio Zeca Costa, Barra do Garças, Mato Grosso state, Brazil
- Capacity: 5,000
Home colours	Away colours

Barra do Garças Futebol Clube, commonly known as Barra do Garças, was a Brazilian football club based in Barra do Garças, Mato Grosso state. They competed once in the Série B, in the Série C and twice in the Copa do Brasil.

== History ==
The club was founded on May 5, 1978. Barra do Garças competed in the Série C in 1993, gaining promotion to the following year's Série B after beating Nacional-AM. The club was eliminated in the First Stage in the 1994 Série B. Barra competed in the Copa do Brasil in 2004, in this year, the name of the club was "Barra Esporte Clube", when they were eliminated in the First Stage by Santa Cruz, and in 2007, when they were eliminated in the First Stage by Brasiliense.

== Stadium ==
Barra do Garças Futebol Clube play their home games at Estádio José Valeriano Costa, nicknamed Estádio Zeca Costa. The stadium has a maximum capacity of 5,000 people.
