= Linhares Esporte Clube =

Linhares
- Full name: Linhares Esporte Clube
- Nickname(s): Coruja Azul
- Founded: 15 March 1991; 34 years ago
- Dissolved: 2003
- Ground: Guilherme Augusto de Carvalho
- Capacity: 12,000
- League: –
Home colours	Away colours

Linhares Esporte Clube, commonly known as Linhares, was a Brazilian football team from Linhares, Espírito Santo. They competed once in the Série C and four times in the Copa do Brasil.

== History ==
Linhares Esporte Clube were founded on March 15, 1991, after a failed attempt to merge Industrial Esporte Clube and América Futebol Clube de Linhares. After the merger failed, Industrial folded and were founded again as Linhares Esporte Clube.

Linhares won the Campeonato Capixaba for the first time in 1995. The club competed in the Série C in 1995, and reached the Copa do Brasil semifinals in 1994, when they were eliminated by Ceará. They competed again in 1996, in 1998 and in 1999.

The club were relegated to the Campeonato Capixaba Second Division in 2002, then, after a financial crisis, the club folded in 2003.

== Stadium ==
The club played their home games at the Guilherme Augusto de Carvalho stadium. The stadium had a maximum capacity of 12,000 people.

== Presidents ==
List of presidents:

- Ademilson Nunes Loureiro (1991)
- José Viguini (1992)
- José Armando Maciel (1993)
- Cirilo Pandini (1994)
- Titi Conti (1995)
- Ademilson Nunes Loureiro (1996—1997)
- Edson Ferreira de Paula (1998—1999)
- Cirilo Pandini (1999)

== Honours ==
- Campeonato Capixaba
  - Winners (4): 1993, 1995, 1997, 1998
  - Runners-up (1): 1996
