= Alvorada, Tocantins =

Municipality in Tocantins, Brazil

Alvorada
- Municipality
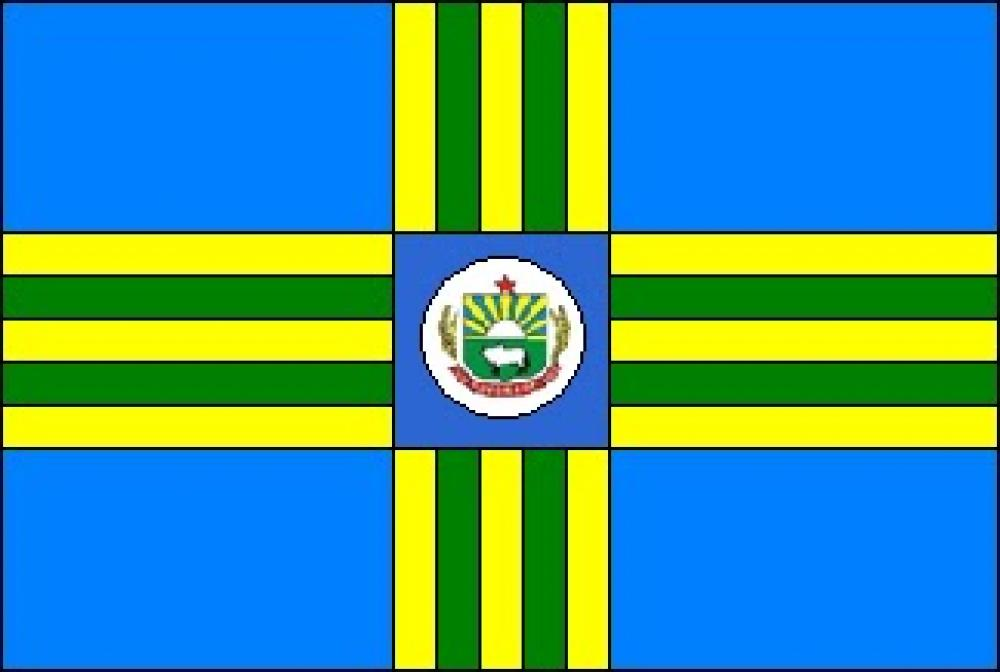
- Flag

- Location in Tocantins state

- Location in Brazil
- Coordinates: 12°28′48″S 49°7′30″W
- Country: Brazil
- Region: North
- State: Tocantins

Government
  - Mayor: Paulo Antônio de Lima Segundo (PSD)

Area
  - Total: 1,212 km^{2} (468 sq mi)

Population (2020)
  - Total: 8,396
  - Density: 6.927/km^{2} (17.94/sq mi)
- Time zone: UTC−3 (BRT)

Alvorada is a municipality located in the Brazilian state of Tocantins. Its population was 8,396 (2020) and its area is 1,212 km^{2} (468 sq mi).

== See also ==
- List of municipalities in Tocantins
