= Estádio José Mammoud Abbas =

Stadium in Governador Valadares, Brazil

- Mamudão
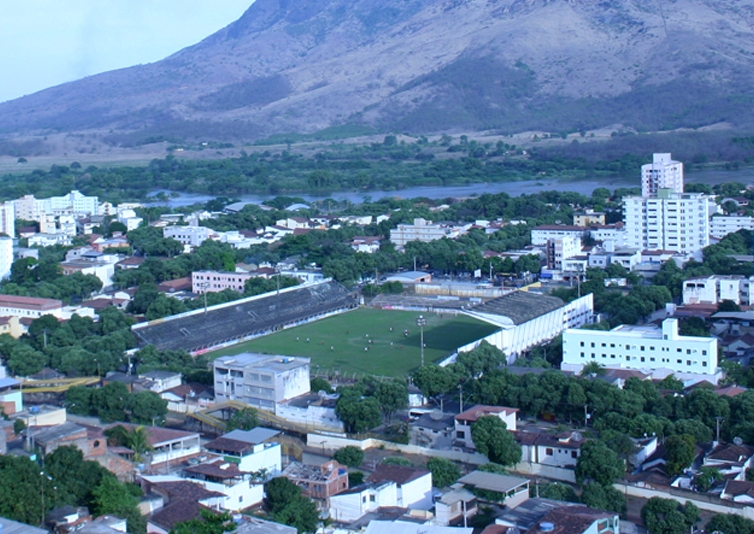
- Mamudão in 2006
- Interactive map of Estádio José Mammoud Abbas
- Full name: Estádio José Mammoud Abbas
- Location: Governador Valadares, Minas Gerais, Brasil
- Coordinates: 18°50′57.88″S 41°56′27.86″W
- Owner: Democrata
- Operator: Democrata
- Capacity: 8,678
- Surface: Natural Grass
- Field size: 105 x 68 m

Construction
- Built: 1964

Tenant
- Democrata

The Estádio José Mammoud Abbas, also known as Mamudão, is a football stadium in the Brazilian municipality of Governador Valadares, in the interior of the state of Minas Gerais. It represents the field command of Esporte Clube Democrata, the city's main professional football team, and has capacity for 8,675 people.

Opened in 1964, the first game was Democrata-GV 0x2 Botafogo-RJ, in a tournament held between Democrata and clubs from Rio de Janeiro.
