= Kaburé Esporte Clube =

Kaburé
- Full name: Kaburé Esporte Clube
- Founded: January 5, 1985 (40 years ago)
- Ground: Bigodão, Colinas do Tocantins
- Capacity: 1,200
Home colors	Away colors

Kaburé Esporte Clube, commonly known as Kaburé, is a Brazilian football club based in Colinas do Tocantins, Tocantins state. They competed in the Série C twice.

== History ==
The club was founded on January 5, 1985. Kaburé won the Copa Tocantins in 1989, 1991, 1993, 1994 and in 1996. They competed in the Copa do Brasil in 1994, 1995 and in 1997. The club competed in the Série C in 1995 and in 1996. After a weak performance, Kaburé was relegated to the Campeonato Tocantinense Second Level in 2009.

== Honours ==
- Campeonato Tocantinense
  - Winners (2): 1989, 1991
  - Runners-up (1): 1996
- Copa Tocantins
  - Winners (3): 1993, 1994, 1996

== Stadium ==
Kaburé Esporte Clube play their home games at Estádio Wilson Alves Ferreira, nicknamed Bigodão. The stadium has a maximum capacity of 1,200 people.
