= 1996 Campeonato Brasileiro Série A =

Campeonato Brasileiro Série A
- Season: 1996
- Champions: Grêmio (2nd title)
- Relegated: No teams were relegated in this season
- Copa Libertadores: Grêmio; Cruzeiro (via Copa do Brasil)
- Matches: 290
- Goals: 787 (2.71 per match)
- Top goalscorer: Paulo Nunes; Renaldo (16 goals each)

The 1996 Campeonato Brasileiro Série A was the 40th edition of the Campeonato Brasileiro Série A. It ran from August 8 to December 15, 1996. It was contested by 24 teams and divided into two stages. In the first one, every team played against each other once. After 23 rounds, the top eight clubs qualified for the next stage, and the bottom two were supposed to be relegated, but CBF decided to keep Fluminense and Bragantino in Série A after the season was over. This decision followed a leak of recorded telephone conversation transcripts broadcast in TV Globo, suggesting that, during the 1996 season, Atlético-PR general manager Mario Celso Petraglia and Corinthians general manager Alberto Dualib had conversations with Brazilian football officials to influence referee appointments. The scandal resulted in mild individual punishments only.

The final stage was played in elimination system with home-and-away matches. The club with better record during the first stage had the advantage to qualify in case of a draw. In the end, Grêmio won their second championship in history based on this rule. They were defeated by runners-up Portuguesa 2–0 at Morumbi Stadium, but came back in the second leg, winning by the same score at their home ground, Olímpico Stadium in Porto Alegre.

== Standings and results ==
=== First stage ===
| Pos | Team | Pld | W | D | L | GF | GA | GD | Pts | Qualification or relegation |
|---|---|---|---|---|---|---|---|---|---|---|
| 1 | Cruzeiro | 23 | 13 | 5 | 5 | 31 | 17 | +14 | 44 | Qualified for next stage |
| 2 | Guarani | 23 | 13 | 4 | 6 | 23 | 14 | +9 | 43 | Qualified for next stage |
| 3 | Palmeiras | 23 | 12 | 7 | 4 | 42 | 20 | +22 | 43 | Qualified for next stage |
| 4 | Atlético Paranaense | 23 | 12 | 3 | 8 | 41 | 28 | +13 | 39 | Qualified for next stage |
| 5 | Atlético Mineiro | 23 | 12 | 3 | 8 | 39 | 32 | +7 | 39 | Qualified for next stage |
| 6 | Grêmio | 23 | 11 | 5 | 7 | 42 | 27 | +15 | 38 | Qualified for next stage |
| 7 | Goiás | 23 | 11 | 4 | 8 | 37 | 27 | +10 | 37 | Qualified for next stage |
| 8 | Portuguesa | 23 | 11 | 3 | 9 | 32 | 29 | +3 | 36 | Qualified for next stage |
| 9 | Internacional | 23 | 10 | 5 | 8 | 31 | 27 | +4 | 35 | |
| 10 | Sport | 23 | 10 | 5 | 8 | 32 | 31 | +1 | 35 | |
| 11 | São Paulo | 23 | 9 | 8 | 6 | 39 | 32 | +7 | 35 | |
| 12 | Corinthians | 23 | 7 | 11 | 5 | 20 | 19 | +1 | 32 | |
| 13 | Flamengo | 23 | 9 | 3 | 11 | 24 | 31 | −7 | 30 | |
| 14 | Coritiba | 23 | 9 | 3 | 11 | 25 | 30 | −5 | 29 (Note: 1 point deducted?) | |
| 15 | Vitória | 23 | 8 | 5 | 10 | 32 | 39 | −7 | 29 | |
| 16 | Paraná | 23 | 8 | 4 | 11 | 26 | 30 | −4 | 28 | |
| 17 | Botafogo | 23 | 7 | 7 | 9 | 33 | 35 | −2 | 28 | |
| 18 | Vasco da Gama | 23 | 8 | 3 | 12 | 37 | 43 | −6 | 27 | |
| 19 | Juventude | 23 | 8 | 3 | 12 | 31 | 37 | −6 | 27 | |
| 20 | Santos | 23 | 7 | 6 | 10 | 26 | 31 | −5 | 27 | |
| 21 | Criciúma | 23 | 6 | 5 | 12 | 31 | 39 | −8 | 23 | |
| 22 | Bahia | 23 | 5 | 8 | 10 | 25 | 35 | −10 | 23 | |
| 23 | Fluminense | 23 | 6 | 4 | 13 | 26 | 50 | −24 | 22 | Relegated to Série B 1997 |
| 24 | Bragantino | 23 | 5 | 4 | 14 | 26 | 48 | −22 | 19 | Relegated to Série B 1997 |

=== Final stage ===
Quarter-finals
1 | Cruzeiro | 0 | 1
8 | Portuguesa | 3 | 0
4 | Atlético (PR) | 1 | 1
5 | Atlético Mineiro | 3 | 0
2 | Guarani | 1 | 1
7 | Goiás | 3 | 0
3 | Palmeiras | 1 | 1
6 | Grêmio | 3 | 0

Semi-finals
Atlético Mineiro | 0 | 2
Portuguesa | 1 | 2
Goiás | 1 | 2
Grêmio | 3 | 2

Finals
Portuguesa | 2 | 0
Grêmio | 0 | 2

Grêmio won based on their better record during first stage.

Campeonato Brasileiro 1996 champions

2nd title

== Top scorers ==
| # | Player | Team | Goals |
|---|---|---|---|
| 1 | (Brazil) Paulo Nunes | Grêmio | 16 |
| 1 | (Brazil) Renaldo | Atlético Mineiro | 16 |
| 3 | (Brazil) Túlio | Botafogo | 13 |
| 3 | (Brazil) Paulo Rink | Atlético Paranaense | 13 |
| 5 | (Brazil) Djalminha | Palmeiras | 12 |
| 5 | (Brazil) Aílton | Guarani | 12 |
| 7 | (Brazil) Oséas | Atlético Paranaense | 11 |
| 7 | (Brazil) Müller | São Paulo | 11 |
| 7 | (Brazil) Mabilia | Criciúma | 11 |
| 7 | (Brazil) Leandro Machado | Internacional | 11 |
| 7 | (Brazil) Rodrigo Fabri | Portuguesa | 11 |
