= Estádio João Hora de Oliveira =

Multi-use stadium in Aracaju, Brazil

Coordinates: 10°55′24″S 37°04′20″W

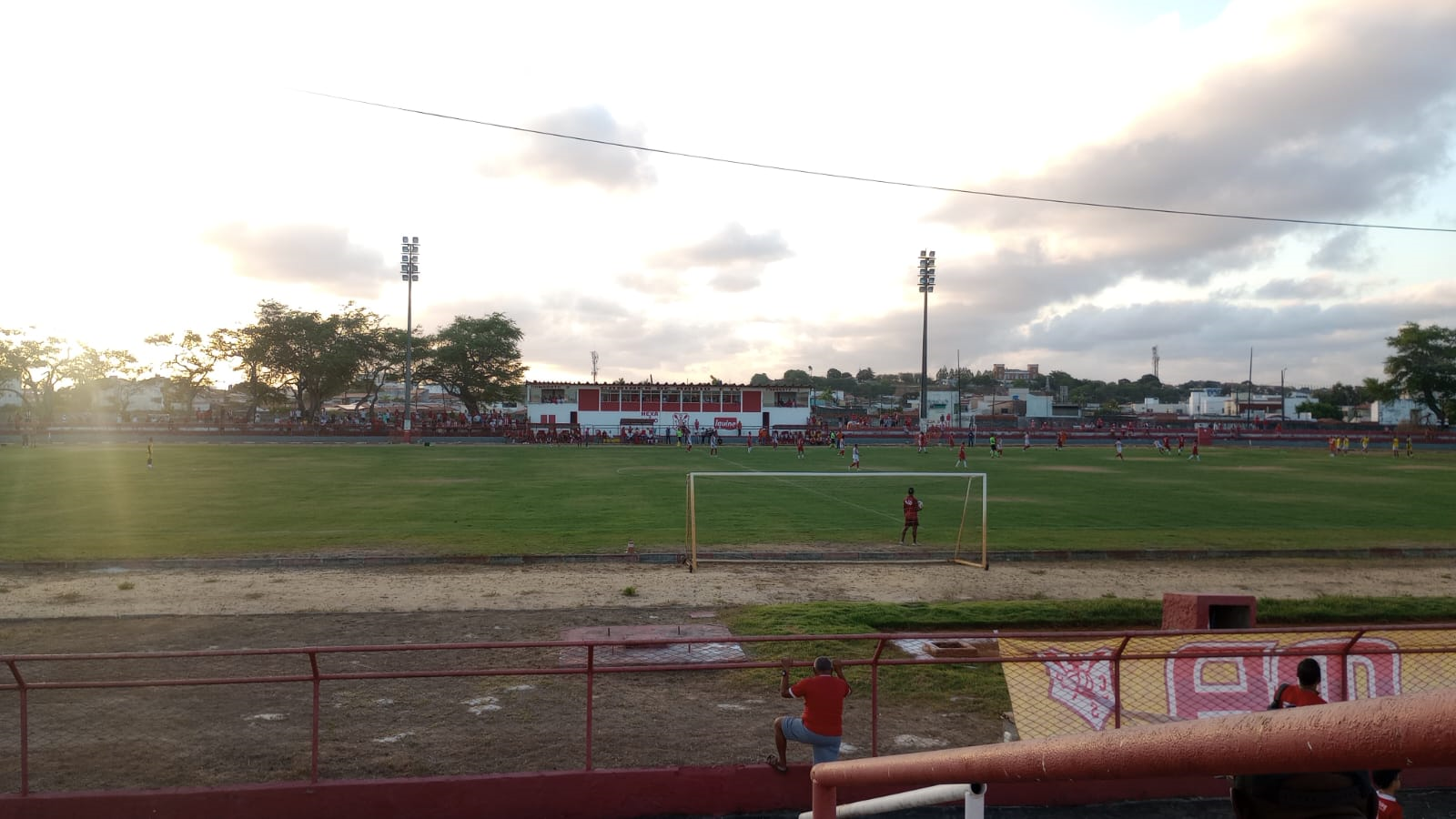
The João Hora de Oliveira Stadium interior

Estádio João Hora de Oliveira is a multi-use stadium located in Aracaju, Brazil. It is used mostly for football matches and hosts the home matches of Club Sportivo Sergipe. The stadium has a maximum capacity of 10,000 people.
