= Barra Futebol Clube (RJ) =

Barra
- Full name: Barra Futebol Clube
- Nickname(s): Leão da Serra
- Founded: June 8, 1939
- Dissolved: 1996
- Ground: Pitucão, Teresópolis, Rio de Janeiro state, Brazil
- Capacity: 4,000
| Home colours | Away colours |

Barra Futebol Clube, commonly known as Barra de Teresópolis or simply as Barra, was a Brazilian football club based in Teresópolis, Rio de Janeiro state. They competed in the Série C once.

== History ==
The club was founded on June 8, 1939. They professionalized its football department in 1993, competing in the Campeonato Carioca Third Level. Barra competed in the Série C in 1995, when they were eliminated in the Third Stage by XV de Piracicaba. The club closed its professional football department in 1996.

== Stadium ==
Barra Futebol Clube played their home games at Estádio Jorge Ferreira da Silva, nicknamed Pitucão. The stadium has a maximum capacity of 4,000 people.
