= Esporte Clube Democrata =

Democrata
- Full name: Esporte Clube Democrata
- Nickname: Pantera (Panther)
- Founded: 13 February 1932; 94 years ago
- Ground: Estádio José Mammoud Abbas
- Capacity: 8,678
- President: Edvaldo Filho
- Head Coach: Paulo César Catanoce
- League: Campeonato Brasileiro Série D Campeonato Mineiro
- 2025: Mineiro, 8th of 12
Home colours	Away colours

Esporte Clube Democrata, usually known simply as Democrata de Governador Valadares, Democrata-GV, or just Democrata, is a traditional Brazilian football club from Governador Valadares, Minas Gerais state.

== History ==
Dissatisfied supporters of Flamengo of Figueira do Rio Doce (old name of Governador Valadares city) founded a new club, named São Domingos de Figueira do Rio Doce on 13 February 1932. Soon later the club was renamed to its current name, Esporte Clube Democrata. Democrata won in 1981 its first title, the Minas Gerais Cup.

== Honours ==
- Campeonato Mineiro
  - Runners-up (1): 1991
- Taça Minas Gerais
  - Winners (1): 1981
- Campeonato Mineiro Módulo II
  - Winners (2): 2005, 2016
- Campeonato Mineiro do Interior
  - Winners (4): 1991, 1993, 1994, 2007
- Troféu Inconfidência
  - Winners (1): 2022

== Current squad ==
=== First Team ===
Note: Flags indicate national team as defined under FIFA eligibility rules; some limited exceptions apply. Players may hold more than one non-FIFA nationality.

No.	Pos.	Nation	Player
—	GK	BRA	Luiz Fernando
—	GK	BRA	Alex
—	GK	BRA	Lucas
—	DF	BRA	Riso
—	DF	BRA	Eliézio
—	DF	BRA	Weldes
—	DF	BRA	Pablo
—	DF	BRA	Geison
—	DF	BRA	Peterson
—	DF	BRA	Fabiano
—	MF	BRA	Saulo

No.	Pos.	Nation	Player
—	MF	URU	Luis Oyarbide
—	MF	BRA	Sandro
—	MF	URU	Jorge García
—	MF	BRA	Zé Maria
—	MF	BRA	Marquinhos
—	MF	BRA	Robson
—	MF	BRA	Hugo
—	MF	BRA	Marcelo Lima
—	FW	ARG	Luis Acuña
—	FW	BRA	Allan
—	FW	BRA	André Luis

== Stadium ==
Democrata's stadium is Estádio José Mammoud Abbas, usually known as Mamudão, inaugurated in 1964, with a maximum capacity of 15,000 people.
