= CR Guará =

Guará
- Full name: Clube de Regatas Guará
- Nickname(s): Lobo
- Founded: January 9, 1957
- Dissolved: 2019; 6 years ago
- Ground: CAVE
- Capacity: 7,000
- League: –
Home colours	Away colours

Clube de Regatas Guará, commonly known as Guará, was an association football club from Guará, a satellite town just west of the Brazilian capital of Brasília. They won the championship of the Federal District, the Campeonato Brasiliense of 1996 and competed in 1979 in the national first division, the Série A.

Guará's colors are yellow, black and white and taken from the official colours of the Administrative Region of Guará. Their badge its inspired by the one of Sport Club Corinthians Paulista of São Paulo.

== History ==
CR Guará was founded on January 9, 1957, by employees of the Departamento de Topografia Humana. Oswaldo Cruz Viera, who was one of the founders, was the club's first president.

The club stopped its football activities during the 1960s, but after merging in the 1970s with two local amateur clubs, named Humaitá and Corinthians, they reopened their football department.

== Stadium ==
CR Guará play their home games at the Estádio Antônio Otoni Filho stadium, nicknamed CAVE. The stadium has a maximum capacity of 7,000 people.

== Honours ==
=== Regional ===
- Torneio Centro-Oeste
  - Winners (1): 1984

=== State ===
- Campeonato Brasiliense
  - Winners (1): 1996
  - Runners-up (8): 1960, 1976, 1981, 1982, 1983, 1988, 1991, 1998
