= 2001 Campeonato Brasileiro Série B =

Campeonato Brasileiro Série B
- Season: 2001
- Champions: Paysandu
- Promoted: Paysandu; Figueirense
- Relegated: Sergipe; Tuna Luso; ABC; Desportiva; Nacional-AM; Serra
- Goals scored: 1,112
- Average goals/game: 2,86
- Top goalscorer: Sérgio Alves (Ceará) - 21
- Biggest home win: Londrina 7-0 Desportiva (8 November 2001)
- Highest scoring: Sergipe 4-4 Anapolina (September 9, 2001); Tuna Luso 6-2 Ceará (September 19, 2001)

The football (soccer) Campeonato Brasileiro Série B 2002, the second level of Brazilian National League, was played from August 11 to December 22, 2001. The competition had 28 clubs and two of them were promoted to Série A and six were relegated to Série C. The competition was won by Paysandu.

Paysandu finished the final phase group with the most points, and was declared 2001 Brazilian Série B champions, claiming the promotion to the 2002 Série A along with Figueirense, the runners-up. The six worst ranked teams in the first round (Sergipe, Tuna Luso, ABC, Desportiva, Nacional-AM and Serra) were relegated to play Série C in 2002.

== Format ==
The 28 teams were divided into two groups, win which each team played against each other twice. The four best placed teams in each group qualified to the quarter-finals, in which the first-placed team of the South-Southeastern Group played against the fourth-placed team of the North-Northeastern Group, the second-placed team of the South-Southeastern Group played against the third-placed team of the North-Northeastern Group, the third-placed team of the South-Southeastern Group played against the second-placed team of the North-Northeastern Group, and the fourth-placed team of the South-Southeastern Group played against the first-placed team of the North-Northeastern Group. The quarter-finals were played over two legs, and in case of tie in points, in case the away goals rule wasn't applicable, the team with the best campaign in the first phase of the two would qualify.the winners qualified to the final phase, in each the remaining four teams played against each other twice. The two best on this group would achieve promotion to the Série A of the following year. The six worst teams in the first stage were relegated to the Campeonato Brasileiro Série C of the following year.

== Teams ==
Team	City	Stadium	2000 Season
ABC	Natal	Machadão	18th in Série B
América de Natal	Natal	Machadão	21st in Série B
Americano	Campos dos Goytacazes	Godofredo Cruz	25th in Série B
Anapolina	Anápolis	Jonas Duarte	13th in Série B
Avaí	Florianópolis	Ressacada	15th in Série B
Bragantino	Bragança Paulista	Nabi Abi Chedid	30th in Série B
Caxias	Caxias do Sul	Centenário	7th in Série B
Ceará	Fortaleza	Castelão	22nd in Série B
CRB	Maceió	Pajuçara	16th in Série B
Criciúma	Criciúma	Heriberto Hülse	14th in Série B
Desportiva	Cariacica	Engenheiro Alencar Araripe	31st in Série B
Figueirense	Florianópolis	Orlando Scarpelli	9th in Série B
Fortaleza	Fortaleza	Castelão	5th in Série B
Joinville	Joinville	Ernestão	20th in Série B
Londrina	Londrina	Café	35th in Série B
Malutrom	São José dos Pinhais	Tancredo Neves	1st in Série C
Nacional-AM	Manaus	Vivaldão	27th in Série B
Náutico	Recife	Aflitos	6th in Série B
Paysandu	Recife	Curuzú	4th in Série B
Remo	Belém	Mangueirão	3rd in Série B
São Raimundo	Manaus	Ismael Benigno	11th in Série B
Sampaio Corrêa	São Luís	Castelão	12th in Série B
Sergipe	Aracaju	João Hora	28th in Série C
Serra	Serra	Robertão	17th in Série B
Tuna Luso	Recife	Ilha do Retiro	4th in Série C
União São João	Araras	Herminião	26th in Série B
Vila Nova	Goiânia	Serra Dourada	34th in Série B
XV de Piracicaba	Piracicaba	Barão da Serra Negra	28th in Série B

== First stage ==
=== North-Northeastern Group ===
Pos	Team	Pld	W	D	L	GF	GA	GD	Pts	Qualification or relegation
1	Paysandu	26	12	11	3	44	26	+18	47	Qualified to Quarterfinals
2	Ceará	26	12	5	9	50	36	+14	41	Qualified to Quarterfinals
3	Náutico	26	12	5	9	44	38	+6	41	Qualified to Quarterfinals
4	CRB	26	12	5	9	35	36	−1	41	Qualified to Quarterfinals
5	Fortaleza	26	11	7	8	40	24	+16	40	
6	São Raimundo	26	11	5	10	36	37	−1	38	
7	América-RN	26	9	11	6	32	30	+2	38	
8	Anapolina	26	10	4	12	45	47	−2	34	
9	Remo	26	9	5	12	33	39	−6	32	
10	Sampaio Corrêa	26	9	5	12	32	42	−10	32	
11	Sergipe	26	8	8	10	38	41	−3	32	Relegation Playoff
12	Tuna Luso	26	8	6	12	36	45	−9	30	Relegation Playoff
13	ABC	26	7	8	11	33	41	−8	29	Relegated
14	Nacional-AM	26	6	7	13	30	47	−17	25	Relegated

=== South-Southeastern Group ===
Pos	Team	Pld	W	D	L	GF	GA	GD	Pts	Qualification or relegation
1	Caxias	26	13	7	6	44	35	+9	46	Qualified to Quarterfinals
2	Figueirense	26	13	3	10	50	38	+12	42	Qualified to Quarterfinals
3	Avaí	26	12	6	8	36	31	+5	42	Qualified to Quarterfinals
4	União São João	26	11	8	7	45	31	+14	41	Qualified to Quarterfinals
5	Joinville	26	11	8	7	39	26	+13	41	
6	Vila Nova	26	12	1	13	43	44	−1	37	
7	Americano	26	11	4	11	32	36	−4	37	
8	Londrina	26	10	7	9	45	36	+9	37	
9	Bragantino	26	11	2	13	40	43	−3	35	
10	XV de Piracicaba	26	12	2	12	39	45	−6	33 (Note: 5 points were deducted from XV de Piracicaba for its use of a ineligible player in one of the matches against União São João.)	
11	Malutrom	26	9	5	12	32	37	−5	32	Relegation Playoff
12	Criciúma	26	8	6	12	35	40	−5	30	Relegation Playoff
13	Desportiva	26	8	5	13	26	48	−22	29	Relegated
14	Serra	26	6	6	14	33	49	−16	24	Relegated

=== Relegation playoff ===
Team 1	Agg.	Team 2	1st leg	2nd leg
Tuna Luso	1–2	Malutrom	1–0	0–2
Criciúma	3-1	Sergipe	3–1	0–0

== Quarterfinals ==
Team 1	Agg.	Team 2	1st leg	2nd leg
União São João	0–0	Paysandu	0-0	0-0
Avaí	5–2	Ceará	2-0	3-2
Náutico	3–3	Figueirense	2–1	1–2
CRB	3-3	Caxias	3-0	0–3

== Final stage ==
Pos	Team	Pld	W	D	L	GF	GA	GD	Pts	Promotion	PAY	FIG	CAX	AVA
1	Paysandu	6	2	3	1	16	10	+6	9	Promoted to Série A 2002		3–0	0–0	4–0
2	Figueirense	6	2	3	1	7	7	0	6	Promoted to Série A 2002	3–3		1–0 (Note: The match was annulled at 90 minutes due to pitch invasion. While the result stood, Figueirense did not earn the points.)	2–0
3	Caxias	6	1	3	2	6	7	−1	6		4–3	0–0		2–2
4	Avaí	6	1	3	2	8	13	−5	6		3–3	2–2	1–0	

== Final standings ==
Pos	Team	Pld	W	D	L	GF	GA	GD	Pts	Promotion or relegation
1	Paysandu	34	14	16	4	60	36	+24	58	Promoted to 2002 Série A
2	Figueirense	34	16	6	12	60	48	+12	51 (Note: 3 points deducted)	Promoted to 2002 Série A
3	Caxias	34	15	10	9	53	45	+8	55	Reached Final phase group
4	Avaí	34	15	9	10	49	46	+3	54	Reached Final phase group
5	Náutico	28	13	5	10	47	41	+6	44	Quarterfinalists
6	CRB	28	13	5	10	38	39	−1	44	Quarterfinalists
7	União São João	28	11	10	7	45	31	+14	43	Quarterfinalists
8	Ceará	28	12	5	11	52	41	+11	41	Quarterfinalists
9	Joinville	26	11	8	7	39	26	+13	41	
10	Fortaleza	26	11	7	8	40	24	+16	40	
11	São Raimundo	26	11	5	10	36	37	−1	38	
12	América-RN	26	9	11	6	32	30	+2	38	
13	Vila Nova	26	12	1	13	43	44	−1	37	
14	Americano	26	11	4	11	32	36	−4	37	
15	Londrina	26	10	7	9	45	36	+9	37	
16	Bragantino	26	11	2	13	40	43	−3	35	
17	Anapolina	26	10	4	12	45	47	−2	34	
18	XV de Piracicaba	26	12	2	12	39	45	−6	33 (Note: 5 points deducted)	
19	Remo	26	9	5	12	33	39	−6	32	
20	Sampaio Corrêa	26	9	5	12	32	42	−10	32	
21	Malutrom	28	10	5	13	34	38	−4	35	Winners of the relegation playoffs.
22	Criciúma	28	9	7	12	38	41	−3	34	Winners of the relegation playoffs.
23	Sergipe	28	8	9	11	39	44	−5	33	Relegated to 2002 Série C
24	Tuna Luso	28	9	6	13	37	47	−10	33	Relegated to 2002 Série C
25	ABC	26	7	8	11	33	41	−8	29	Relegated to 2002 Série C
26	Desportiva	26	8	5	13	26	48	−22	29	Relegated to 2002 Série C
27	Nacional-AM	26	6	7	13	30	47	−17	25	Relegated to 2002 Série C
28	Serra	26	6	6	14	33	49	−16	24	Relegated to 2002 Série C

== Sources ==
- "Brazil Second Level 2001". RSSSF.
