= 2003 Campeonato Brasileiro Série B =

Campeonato Brasileiro Série B
- Season: 2003
- Champions: Palmeiras
- Promoted: Palmeiras; Botafogo
- Relegated: Gama; União São João
- Goals: 920
- Average goals/game: 2.97
- Top goalscorer: Vágner Love (Palmeiras) (19 goals)

The 2003 Campeonato Brasileiro Série B, the second level of the Brazilian National League, was played from April 25 to November 29, 2003. The competition had 24 clubs; two of them were promoted to Série A and two were relegated to Série C.

In the first round, each team played against each other, much like what happens in Série A. However, in contrast to Série A, each team played against the other only once. Therefore, each team played 23 games, 12 home and 11 away (or the opposite). The eight best ranked teams advanced to the second round, where they were divided in two groups of four. Teams in each group played against each other home and away. The two best ranked teams in each group advanced to the final round. Those four teams were put in a single group, and played against each other home and away.

Palmeiras finished the final phase group with most points and was declared 2003 Brazilian Série B champions, claiming the promotion to the 2004 Série A along with Botafogo, the runners-up. The two worst ranked teams in the first round (Gama and União São João) were relegated to play Série C in 2004.

== Teams ==
Team	City	Stadium	2002 Season
América Mineiro	Belo Horizonte	Independência	7th in Série B
América de Natal	Natal	Machadão	10th in Série B
Anapolina	Anápolis	Jonas Duarte	17th in Série B
Avaí	Florianópolis	Ressacada	6th in Série B
Botafogo	Rio de Janeiro	Caio Martins	26th in Série A
Brasiliense	Taguatinga, DF	Boca do Jacaré	1st in Série C
Caxias	Caxias do Sul	Centenário	14th in Série B
Ceará	Fortaleza	Castelão	13th in Série B
CRB	Maceió	Pajuçara	9th in Série B
Gama	Gama, DF	Bezerrão	25th in Série A
Joinville	Joinville	Ernestão	12th in Série B
Londrina	Londrina	Café	18th in Série B
Marília	Marília	Bento de Abreu	2nd in Série C
Mogi Mirim	Mogi Mirim	Vail Chaves	11th in Série B
Náutico	Recife	Aflitos	20th in Série B
Palmeiras	São Paulo	Parque Antárctica	24th in Série A
Paulista	Jundiaí	Jayme Cintra	4th in Série B
Portuguesa	São Paulo	Canindé	23rd in Série A
Remo	Belém	Mangueirão	8th in Série B
Santa Cruz	Recife	Arruda	3rd in Série B
São Raimundo	Manaus	Ismael Benigno	19th in Série B
Sport	Recife	Ilha do Retiro	5th in Série B
União São João	Araras	Herminião	16th in Série B
Vila Nova	Goiânia	Serra Dourada	15th in Série B

== First stage ==
Pos	Team	Pld	W	D	L	GF	GA	GD	Pts	Qualification or relegation
1	Palmeiras	23	13	8	2	54	25	+29	47	Qualified to Second Stage
2	Botafogo	23	11	8	4	45	26	+19	41	Qualified to Second Stage
3	Remo	23	11	6	6	42	33	+9	39	Qualified to Second Stage
4	Sport	23	9	10	4	34	22	+12	37	Qualified to Second Stage
5	Brasiliense	23	9	10	4	33	24	+9	37	Qualified to Second Stage
6	Marília	23	9	9	5	32	24	+8	36	Qualified to Second Stage
7	Náutico	23	11	5	7	41	27	+14	35 (Note: The points won by Náutico in its match against Joinville were given to Joinville due to Náutico's fielding of a ineligible player.)	Qualified to Second Stage
8	Santa Cruz	23	10	5	8	35	38	−3	35	Qualified to Second Stage
9	Paulista	23	9	8	6	37	28	+9	35	
10	Londrina	23	8	7	8	39	42	−3	31	
11	América-RN	23	6	10	7	36	38	−2	31 (Note: The points won by Anapolina in its match against América-RN were given to América-RN due to Anapolina's fielding of a ineligible player.)	
12	Avaí	23	8	6	9	23	30	−7	30	
13	Portuguesa	23	7	9	7	39	33	+6	30	
14	Ceará	23	7	9	7	36	30	+6	30	
15	Joinville	23	7	6	10	33	41	−8	30	
16	CRB	23	7	6	10	28	37	−9	27	
17	Mogi Mirim	23	7	5	11	28	43	−15	26	
18	São Raimundo	23	6	8	9	27	31	−4	26	
19	Vila Nova	23	6	8	9	32	39	−7	26	
20	Anapolina	23	7	6	10	30	43	−13	24	
21	Caxias	23	5	9	9	27	39	−12	24	
22	América Mineiro	23	4	12	7	35	38	−3	24	
23	Gama	23	3	10	10	28	41	−13	19	Relegated to Série C 2004
24	União São João	23	4	4	15	22	44	−22	16	Relegated to Série C 2004

Source: rsssf.com

== Second stage ==
=== Group A ===
Pos	Team	Pld	W	D	L	GF	GA	GD	Pts	Qualification	PAL	SPT	BRA	STA
1	Palmeiras	6	5	0	1	14	8	+6	15	Qualified to Final Stage		2–3	6–2	2–0
2	Sport	6	2	2	2	9	8	+1	8	Qualified to Final Stage	1–2		1–1	3–1
3	Brasiliense FC	6	2	1	3	7	10	−3	7		1–2	1–0		2–0
4	Santa Cruz	6	1	1	4	7	11	−4	4		1–3	1–1	4–0	

Source: rsssf.com
Legend: Blue = home team win; Yellow = draw; Red = away team win.

=== Group B ===
Pos	Team	Pld	W	D	L	GF	GA	GD	Pts	Qualification	MAR	BOT	NAU	REM
1	Marília	6	3	2	1	12	8	+4	11	Qualified to Final Stage		2–2	4–1	2–0
2	Botafogo	6	3	1	2	16	11	+5	10	Qualified to Final Stage	3–1		1–2	4–1
3	Náutico	6	2	1	3	11	15	−4	7		1–2	2–4		2–2
4	Remo	6	1	2	3	9	14	−5	5		1–1	3–2	2–3	

Source: rsssf.com
Legend: Blue = home team win; Yellow = draw; Red = away team win.

== Final stage ==
Pos	Team	Pld	W	D	L	GF	GA	GD	Pts	Promotion	PAL	BOT	SPT	MAR
1	Palmeiras	6	5	1	0	12	3	+9	16	Promoted to Série A 2004		4–1	1–0	2–0
2	Botafogo	6	2	2	2	9	10	−1	8	Promoted to Série A 2004	1–1		3–1	3–1
3	Sport	6	1	2	3	6	8	−2	5		1–2	3–1		0–0
4	Marília	6	0	3	3	2	8	−6	3		0–2	0–0	0–0	

Source: rsssf.com
Legend: Blue = home team win; Yellow = draw; Red = away team win.

== Sources ==
- RSSSF
