= 2002 Campeonato Brasileiro Série B =

Campeonato Brasileiro Série B
- Season: 2002
- Champions: Criciúma
- Promoted: Criciúma; Fortaleza
- Relegated: Americano; Botafogo-SP; Sampaio Corrêa; Guarany de Sobral; XV de Piracicaba; Bragantino
- Goals scored: 970
- Average goals/game: 2.86
- Top goalscorer: Vinícius (Fortaleza) - 22

The football (soccer) Campeonato Brasileiro Série B 2002, the second level of Brazilian National League, was played from August 11 to December 7, 2002. The competition had 26 clubs and two of them were promoted to Série A and six were relegated to Série C.The competition was won by Criciúma.

Criciúma defeated Fortaleza in the finals, and was declared 2002 Brazilian Série B champions, claiming the promotion to the 2003 Série A along with Fortaleza, the runners-up. The six worst ranked teams in the first round ( Americano, Botafogo-SP, Sampaio Corrêa, Guarany de Sobral, XV de Piracicaba and Bragantino) were relegated to play Série C in 2003.

== Format ==
The 26 teams played against each other once. The eight best placed teams qualified to the quarter-finals, in which the eight-placed team played against the first-placed team, the seventh-placed team played against the second-placed team, the sixth-placed team played against the third-placed team, and the fifth-placed team played against the fourth-placed team. The quarter-finals, semi-finals and finals were played over two legs. The six worst teams in the first stage were relegated to the Campeonato Brasileiro Série C of the following year.

== Teams ==
Team	City	Stadium	2001 Season
América Mineiro	Belo Horizonte	Independência	27th in Série A
América de Natal	Natal	Machadão	12th in Série B
Americano	Rio de Janeiro	Godofredo Cruz	14th in Série B
Anapolina	Anápolis	Jonas Duarte	17th in Série B
Avaí	Florianópolis	Ressacada	4th in Série B
Botafogo-SP	Ribeirão Preto	Santa Cruz	26th in Série A
Bragantino	Bragança Paulista	Nabi Abi Chedid	16th in Série B
Caxias	Caxias do Sul	Centenário	3rd in Série B
Ceará	Fortaleza	Castelão	8th in Série B
CRB	Maceió	Pajuçara	6th in Série B
Criciúma	Criciúma	Heriberto Hülse	22nd in Série B
Fortaleza	Fortaleza	Castelão	9th in Série B
Guarany de Sobral	Sobral	Junco	3rd in Série C
Joinville	Joinville	Ernestão	9th in Série B
Jundiaí	Jundiaí	Jayme Cintra	1st in Série C
Londrina	Londrina	Café	15th in Série B
Mogi Mirim	Mogi Mirim	Vail Chaves	2nd in Série C
Náutico	Recife	Aflitos	5th in Série B
Remo	Belém	Mangueirão	19th in Série B
Santa Cruz	Recife	Arruda	25th in Série A
São Raimundo	Manaus	Ismael Benigno	11th in Série B
Sampaio Corrêa	São Luís	Castelão	20th in Série B
Sport	Recife	Ilha do Retiro	28th in Série A
União São João	Araras	Herminião	7th in Série B
Vila Nova	Goiânia	Serra Dourada	13th in Série B
XV de Piracicaba	Piracicaba	Barão da Serra Negra	18th in Série B

== First stage ==
Pos	Team	Pld	W	D	L	GF	GA	GD	Pts	Qualification or relegation
1	Criciúma	25	16	3	6	45	34	+11	51	Qualified to Quarterfinals
2	Sport	25	15	5	5	38	21	+17	50	Qualified to Quarterfinals
3	Fortaleza	25	15	3	7	48	24	+24	48	Qualified to Quarterfinals
4	Santa Cruz	25	13	8	4	46	24	+22	47	Qualified to Quarterfinals
5	Avaí	25	14	4	7	39	20	+19	46	Qualified to Quarterfinals
6	América Mineiro	25	12	4	9	49	36	+13	40	Qualified to Quarterfinals
7	Jundiaí	25	11	6	8	37	27	+10	39	Qualified to Quarterfinals
8	Remo	25	11	5	9	37	35	+2	38	Qualified to Quarterfinals
9	CRB	25	10	8	7	35	32	+3	38	
10	América-RN	25	10	6	9	46	35	+11	36	
11	Mogi Mirim	25	11	2	12	37	39	−2	35	
12	Joinville	25	10	4	11	36	44	−8	34	
13	Ceará	25	9	6	10	35	27	+8	33	
14	Caxias	25	9	6	10	31	24	+7	33	
15	Vila Nova	25	9	6	10	40	35	+5	33	
16	União São João	25	9	6	10	32	40	−8	33	
17	Anapolina	25	8	9	8	33	35	−2	33	
18	Londrina	25	8	9	8	28	30	−2	33	
19	São Raimundo	25	10	2	13	34	37	−3	32	
20	Náutico	25	9	5	11	38	35	+3	32	
21	Americano	25	9	5	11	34	36	−2	32	Relegated to 2003 Série C
22	Botafogo-SP	25	8	6	11	36	60	−24	30	Relegated to 2003 Série C
23	Sampaio Corrêa	25	7	4	14	25	50	−25	25	Relegated to 2003 Série C
24	Guarany de Sobral	25	5	5	15	28	51	−23	20	Relegated to 2003 Série C
25	XV de Piracicaba	25	5	4	16	19	44	−25	19	Relegated to 2003 Série C
26	Bragantino	25	4	5	16	23	54	−31	17	Relegated to 2003 Série C

== Quarterfinals ==
Team 1	Agg.	Team 2	1st leg	2nd leg
Jundiaí	3–2	Sport	2–1	1–1
América Mineiro	0–2	Fortaleza	0–0	0–2
Avaí	2–3	Santa Cruz	1–1	1–2
Remo	2–5	Criciúma	2–1	0–4

== Semifinals ==
Team 1	Agg.	Team 2	1st leg	2nd leg
Jundiaí	3–8	Fortaleza	1–6	2–2
Santa Cruz	0–4	Criciúma	0–1	0–3

== Finals ==
Team 1	Agg.	Team 2	1st leg	2nd leg
Fortaleza	3–4	Criciúma	2–0	1–4
