= 2003 Botafogo FR season =

Botafogo
2003 season
- President: Bebeto de Freitas
- Manager: Levir Culpi
- Stadium: Estádio Caio Martins
- Campeonato Brasileiro Série B: First stage – 2nd Second stage – 2nd Final stage – 2nd (Promoted)
- Campeonato Carioca: 5th
- Copa do Brasil: Third round
- Top goalscorer: League: Leandrão (17); All: Leandrão (17)
- Biggest defeat: Fluminense 5–0 Botafogo

The 2003 season was Botafogo's 99th in existence and the first year back in the second division. They played in the Série B and the Campeonato Carioca.

== Competitions ==
=== Overall record ===
Competition	First match	Last match	Starting round	Final position	Record							
Competition	First match	Last match	Starting round	Final position	Pld	W	D	L	GF	GA	GD	Win %
Série B First stage	26 April 2003	27 September 2003	Matchday 1	2nd	23	11	8	4	45	26	+19	47.83
Série B Second stage	4 October 2003	25 October 2003	Group stage	2nd	6	3	1	2	16	11	+5	50.00
Série B Final stage	1 November 2003	29 November 2003	Group stage	2nd	6	2	2	2	9	10	−1	33.33
Campeonato Carioca	19 January 2003	5 March 2003	Taça Guanabara	5th	11	5	2	4	18	20	−2	45.45
Copa do Brasil	5 February 2003	1 May 2003	First round	Third round	5	3	0	2	9	6	+3	60.00
Total					51	24	13	14	97	73	+24	47.06

Source: Competitions

=== Campeonato Brasileiro Série B ===
==== First stage ====
Pos	Team	Pld	W	D	L	GF	GA	GD	Pts	Qualification or relegation
1	Palmeiras	23	13	8	2	54	25	+29	47	Qualified to Second Stage
2	Botafogo	23	11	8	4	45	26	+19	41	Qualified to Second Stage
3	Remo	23	11	6	6	42	33	+9	39	Qualified to Second Stage
4	Sport	23	9	10	4	34	22	+12	37	Qualified to Second Stage
5	Brasiliense	23	9	10	4	33	24	+9	37	Qualified to Second Stage

Source: rsssf.com

==== Results summary ====
Overall								Home						Away					
Pld	W	D	L	GF	GA	GD	Pts	W	D	L	GF	GA	GD	W	D	L	GF	GA	GD
23	11	8	4	45	26	+19	41	6	4	2	23	11	+12	5	4	2	22	15	+7

Source: Tribuna

==== Results by round ====
Round	1	2	3	4	5	6	7	8	9	10	11	12	13	14	15	16	17	18	19	20	21	22	23
Ground	A	H	A	H	A	H	A	H	A	H	H	A	H	A	H	H	A	A	H	A	H	A	H
Result	L	D	W	D	W	W	W	L	D	W	W	W	W	D	W	D	L	W	D	D	W	D	L
Position	19	19	10	12	8	2	1	2	5	1	1	1	1	1	1	2	2	2	2	2	2	2	2

A = Away; H = Home; W = Win; D = Draw; L = Loss

==== Matches ====
26 April 2003 1	Vila Nova	2–1	Botafogo	Goiânia
				Stadium: Estádio Serra Dourada

4 May 2003 2	Botafogo	1–1	Avaí	Niterói
				Stadium: Estádio Caio Martins

10 May 2003 3	CRB	0–3	Botafogo	Maceió
				Stadium: Estádio Rei Pelé

17 May 2003 4	Botafogo	0–0	Portuguesa	Niterói
				Stadium: Estádio Caio Martins

23 May 2003 5	América de Natal	1–2	Botafogo	Natal
				Stadium: Machadão

31 May 2003 6	Botafogo	4–0	Brasiliense	Niterói
				Stadium: Estádio Caio Martins

6 June 2003 7	União São João	2–3	Botafogo	Araras
				Stadium: Estádio Hermínio Ometto

13 June 2003 8	Botafogo	0–2	Ceará	Niterói
				Stadium: Estádio Caio Martins

21 June 2003 9	Palmeiras	0–0	Botafogo	São Paulo
				Stadium: Estádio Palestra Itália

28 June 2003 10	Botafogo	3–1	Remo	Niterói
				Stadium: Estádio Caio Martins

5 July 2003 11	Botafogo	3–0	Santa Cruz	Niterói
				Stadium: Estádio Caio Martins

12 July 2003 12	Sport	1–2	Botafogo	Recife
				Stadium: Estádio Ilha do Retiro

19 July 2003 13	Botafogo	2–1	América Mineiro	Niterói
				Stadium: Estádio Caio Martins

26 July 2003 14	Londrina	2–2	Botafogo	Londrina
				Stadium: Estádio do Café

2 August 2003 15	Botafogo	4–0	Anapolina	Niterói
				Stadium: Estádio Caio Martins

10 August 2003 16	Botafogo	2–2	Marília	Niterói
				Stadium: Estádio Caio Martins

16 August 2003 17	Joinville	3–2	Botafogo	Joinville
				Stadium: Estádio Ernesto Schlemm Sobrinho

23 August 2003 18	Mogi Mirim	1–4	Botafogo	Mogi Mirim
				Stadium: Estádio Papa João Paulo II

2 September 2003 19	Botafogo	2–2	Caxias	Niterói
				Stadium: Estádio Caio Martins

6 September 2003 20	Gama	1–1	Botafogo	Gama
				Stadium: Bezerrão

13 September 2003 21	Botafogo	2–1	Paulista	Niterói
				Stadium: Estádio Caio Martins

20 September 2003 22	São Raimundo	2–2	Botafogo	Manaus
				Stadium: Vivaldão

27 September 2003 23	Botafogo	0–1	Náutico	Niterói
				Stadium: Estádio Caio Martins

==== Second stage ====
Pos	Team	Pld	W	D	L	GF	GA	GD	Pts	Qualification	MAR	BOT	NAU	REM
1	Marília	6	3	2	1	12	8	+4	11	Qualified to Final Stage		2–2	4–1	2–0
2	Botafogo	6	3	1	2	16	11	+5	10	Qualified to Final Stage	3–1		1–2	4–1
3	Náutico	6	2	1	3	11	15	−4	7		1–2	2–4		2–2
4	Remo	6	1	2	3	9	14	−5	5		1–1	3–2	2–3	

Source: rsssf.com

Round	1	2	3	4	5	6
Ground	A	H	A	H	A	H
Result	W	W	L	W	D	L
Position						

A = Away; H = Home; W = Win; D = Draw; L = Loss

4 October 2003 1	Náutico	2–4	Botafogo	Recife
				Stadium: Estádio dos Aflitos

7 October 2003 2	Botafogo	3–1	Marília	Niterói
				Stadium: Estádio Caio Martins

11 October 2003 3	Remo	3–2	Botafogo	Belém
				Stadium: Baenão

18 October 2003 4	Botafogo	4–1	Remo	Niterói
				Stadium: Estádio Caio Martins

21 October 2003 5	Marília	2–2	Botafogo	Marília
				Stadium: Estádio Bento de Abreu

25 October 2003 6	Botafogo	1–2	Náutico	Niterói
				Stadium: Estádio Caio Martins

==== Final stage ====
Pos	Team	Pld	W	D	L	GF	GA	GD	Pts	Promotion	PAL	BOT	SPT	MAR
1	Palmeiras	6	5	1	0	12	3	+9	16	Promoted to Série A 2004		4–1	1–0	2–0
2	Botafogo	6	2	2	2	9	10	−1	8	Promoted to Série A 2004	1–1		3–1	3–1
3	Sport	6	1	2	3	6	8	−2	5		1–2	3–1		0–0
4	Marília	6	0	3	3	2	8	−6	3		0–2	0–0	0–0	

Source: rsssf.com

Round	1	2	3	4	5	6
Ground	H	A	H	A	H	A
Result	D	D	W	L	W	L
Position	1	2	2	2	2	2

A = Away; H = Home; W = Win; D = Draw; L = Loss

1 November 2003 1	Botafogo	1–1	Palmeiras	Niterói
				Stadium: Estádio Caio Martins

4 November 2003 2	Marília	0–0	Botafogo	Marília
				Stadium: Estádio Bento de Abreu

8 November 2003 3	Botafogo	3–1	Sport	Niterói
				Stadium: Estádio Caio Martins

15 November 2003 4	Sport	3–1	Botafogo	Recife
				Stadium: Estádio Ilha do Retiro

22 November 2003 5	Botafogo	3–1	Marília	Niterói
				Stadium: Estádio Caio Martins

29 November 2003 6	Palmeiras	4–1	Botafogo	São Paulo
				Stadium: Estádio Palestra Itália

=== Campeonato Carioca ===
Round	1	2	3	4	5	6	7	8	9	10	11
Ground	A	H	A	H	H	A	H	A	H	A	A
Result	L	D	W	W	D	W	L	W	L	W	L
Position	10	9	6	5	5	4	5	4	5	5	5

A = Away; H = Home; W = Win; D = Draw; L = Loss

19 January 2003 1	Bangu	2–1	Botafogo
17:00 UTC−3

26 January 2003 2	Vasco da Gama	1–1	Botafogo
17:00 UTC−3

29 January 2003 3	Botafogo	1–0	Americano
20:30 UTC−3

2 February 2003 4	Friburguense	1–2	Botafogo
17:00 UTC−3

8 February 2003 5	Botafogo	1–1	Madureira
16:00 UTC−3

12 February 2003 6	Botafogo	2–1	Olaria
20:30 UTC−3

16 February 2003 7	Flamengo	4–2	Botafogo
17:00 UTC−3

19 February 2003 8	Botafogo	5–2	Volta Redonda
20:30 UTC−3

23 February 2003 9	Fluminense	5–0	Botafogo
17:00 UTC−3

26 February 2003 10	Cabofriense	1–2	Botafogo
20:30 UTC−3

5 March 2003 11	America-RJ	2–1	Botafogo
20:30 UTC−3

=== Copa do Brasil ===
5 February 2003 First round	CENE	0–2	Botafogo	Campo Grande
				Stadium: Morenão

19 March 2003 Second round First leg	São Caetano	1–2	Botafogo	São Caetano do Sul
				Stadium: Estádio Anacleto Campanella

26 March 2003 Second round Second leg	Botafogo	2–0 (4–1 agg.)	São Caetano	Rio de Janeiro
15:30				Stadium: Maracanã Stadium

9 April 2003 Third round First leg	Goiás	2–1	Botafogo	Serra Dourada
21:40

1 May 2003 Third round Second leg	Botafogo	2–3 (3–5 agg.)	Goiás	Niterói
15:30		Report		Stadium: Estádio Caio Martins; Referee: Wilson Luís Semene
