= Luiz Paulo (footballer, born 1950) =

Brazilian footballer

Personal information
- Full name: Luiz Paulo Paz Camargo
- Date of birth: 11 February 1950 (age 76)
- Place of birth: Rio de Janeiro, Brazil
- Position: Left winger

Senior career*
Years	Team	Apps	(Gls)
1973	Campo Grande-RJ		
1973–1974	Olaria		
1975–1978	Flamengo	207	(21)
1979	Bangu		
1980	CSA		
1980–1983	Campo Grande-RJ		
1984	Avaí		

Managerial career
- 1995: Honduras U23
- * Club domestic league appearances and goals as of 14 March 2024

Luiz Paulo Paz Camargo (born 11 February 1950), simply known as Luiz Paulo, is a Brazilian former professional footballer who played as a left winger.

== Career ==
Revealed by Campo Grande, Luiz Paulo stood out mainly for Flamengo, where he made 207 appearances and scored 21 goals, one of them against the Brazil national football team, in the Cup in honor of Geraldo Assoviador who had died days before.

In 1995, he was the coach of Honduras at the Pan American Games, where they eliminated Brazil on penalties.

== Honours ==
Flamengo

- Taça Geraldo Cleofas: 1976

Campo Grande

- Campeonato Brasileiro Série B: 1982
