= 1982 Campeonato Brasileiro Série B =

Campeonato Brasileiro Série B
- Season: 1982
- Champions: Campo Grande (1st title)
- Promoted: Campo Grande; CSA
- Top goalscorer: Luizinho (Campo Grande) - 10 goals
- Biggest home win: Volta Redonda 8-0 Operário-MT (January 24, 1982)
- Highest scoring: Volta Redonda 8-0 Operário-MT (January 24, 1982)

The 1982 Campeonato Brasileiro Série B, officially, the Taça de Prata 1982, was the 5th edition of the Campeonato Brasileiro Série B.The championship was performed by 48 teams.in the first phase, 36 teams, divided into 6 groups of 6 teams each, in which the two best teams of each group proceeded to the second phase, in which the twelve teams were divided into four groups of three teams.the first placed team of each group were promoted to the Second phase of the Taça de Ouro of the same year. the second placed teams of each group would proceed to the Third phase, in which they would be joined by the twelve clubs that hadn't qualified to the Second phase in the Taça de Ouro.the Third phase was disputed in a knockout tournament format, and the winners qualified to the Quarterfinals, with the knockout tournament continuing until two teams reached the finals.those were promoted to the Taça de Ouro of the following year.

== First phase ==
=== Group A ===
Pos	Team	Pld	W	D	L	GF	GA	GD	Pts
1	(Piauí) Tiradentes-PI	5	3	1	1	10	6	+4	7
2	(Ceará) Fortaleza	5	3	1	1	7	6	+1	7
3	(Pará) Remo	5	2	3	0	9	5	+4	7
4	(Maranhão) Sampaio Corrêa	5	1	3	1	7	6	+1	5
5	(Amazonas (Brazilian state)) Fast	5	1	1	3	10	13	−3	3
6	(Ceará) Tiradentes-CE	5	0	1	4	4	11	−7	1

=== Group B ===
Pos	Team	Pld	W	D	L	GF	GA	GD	Pts
1	(Paraíba) Campinense	5	2	3	0	8	5	+3	7
2	(Alagoas) CRB	5	1	4	0	7	5	+2	6
3	(Pernambuco) Central	5	1	3	1	5	5	0	5
4	Sergipe	5	1	3	1	5	6	−1	5
5	(Pernambuco) Santa Cruz	5	1	3	1	4	5	−1	5
6	(Rio Grande do Norte) Baraúnas	5	0	2	3	3	6	−3	2

=== Group C ===
Pos	Team	Pld	W	D	L	GF	GA	GD	Pts
1	(Rio de Janeiro (state)) América-RJ	5	4	0	1	10	3	+7	8
2	(São Paulo (state)) Corinthians	5	4	0	1	11	3	+8	8
3	(Bahia) Catuense	5	3	1	1	5	3	+2	7
4	(Espírito Santo) Colatina	5	2	1	2	5	6	−1	5
5	(Bahia) Leônico	5	1	0	4	3	9	−6	2
6	(Federal District (Brazil)) Guará	5	0	0	5	2	12	−10	0

=== Group D ===
Pos	Team	Pld	W	D	L	GF	GA	GD	Pts
1	(Goiás) Vila Nova	5	4	1	0	6	2	+4	9
2	(Rio de Janeiro (state)) Volta Redonda	5	3	2	0	14	3	+11	8
3	(São Paulo (state)) Juventus	5	2	1	2	9	8	+1	5
4	(São Paulo (state)) Palmeiras	5	1	3	1	5	5	0	5
5	(Mato Grosso) Operário-MT	5	1	0	4	3	14	−11	2
6	(Goiás) Anápolis	5	0	1	4	3	8	−5	1

=== Group E ===
Pos	Team	Pld	W	D	L	GF	GA	GD	Pts
1	(Rio de Janeiro (state)) Campo Grande	5	4	1	0	11	2	+9	8 (Note: 1 point deducted?)
2	(Minas Gerais) Uberaba	5	3	2	0	8	6	+2	8
3	(Rio de Janeiro (state)) Americano	5	3	0	2	6	6	0	6
4	(São Paulo (state)) Portuguesa	5	2	1	2	8	8	0	5
5	(Mato Grosso do Sul) Comercial-MS	5	1	0	4	2	8	−6	2
6	(Minas Gerais) América-MG	5	0	0	5	2	7	−5	0

=== Group F ===
Pos	Team	Pld	W	D	L	GF	GA	GD	Pts
1	(Paraná (state)) Atlético-PR	5	4	0	1	6	8	−2	8
2	(Rio Grande do Sul) São Paulo-RS	5	2	1	2	7	7	0	5
3	(São Paulo (state)) Botafogo-SP	5	1	3	1	4	3	+1	5
4	(Rio Grande do Sul) Novo Hamburgo	5	1	3	1	2	2	0	5
5	(Santa Catarina (state)) Criciúma	5	1	2	2	9	5	+4	4
6	(Paraná (state)) Cascavel	5	1	1	3	2	5	−3	3

== Second phase ==
=== Group G ===
Pos	Team	Pld	W	D	L	GF	GA	GD	Pts	Promotion or qualification
1	América-RJ	2	1	1	0	6	2	+4	3	Promoted to Second phase of Taça de Ouro
2	Tiradentes-PI	2	0	2	0	3	3	0	2	Qualified to Third phase
3	CRB	2	0	1	1	1	5	−4	1	

=== Group H ===
Pos	Team	Pld	W	D	L	GF	GA	GD	Pts	Promotion or qualification
1	Corinthians	2	2	0	0	6	3	+3	4	Promoted to Second phase of Taça de Ouro
2	Fortaleza	2	1	0	1	5	5	0	2	Qualified to Third phase
3	Campinense	2	0	0	2	2	5	−3	0	

=== Group I ===
Pos	Team	Pld	W	D	L	GF	GA	GD	Pts	Promotion or qualification
1	São Paulo-RS	2	1	1	0	3	1	+2	3	Promoted to Second phase of Taça de Ouro
2	Uberaba	2	1	0	1	4	4	0	2	Qualified to Third phase
3	Vila Nova	2	0	1	1	3	5	−2	1	

=== Group J ===
Pos	Team	Pld	W	D	L	GF	GA	GD	Pts	Promotion or qualification
1	Atlético-PR	2	2	0	0	4	1	+3	4	Promoted to Second phase of Taça de Ouro
2	Campo Grande	2	0	1	1	3	4	−1	1	Qualified to Third phase
3	Volta Redonda	2	0	1	1	2	4	−2	1	

== Third phase ==
Team 1	Agg.	Team 2	1st leg	2nd leg
Ferroviário	1-1	Itabaiana	1-1	0-0
Desportiva	0-3	Uberaba	0-3	0-0
Goiás	0-4	Campo Grande	0-0	0-4
River	4-3	Nacional-AM	4-0	0-3
Taguatinga	2-8	Joinville	2-2	0-6
América-RN	0-3	Tiradentes-PI	0-2	0-1
Mixto	6-1	Vitória	5-0	1-1
CSA	3-1	Fortaleza	2-0	1-1

== Quarterfinals ==
Team 1	Agg.	Team 2	1st leg	2nd leg
Itabaiana	1-7	Uberaba	1-4	0-3
River	2-7	Campo Grande	2-3	0-4
Joinville	3-2	Tiradentes-PI	1-0	2-2
CSA	5-2	Mixto	3-1	2-1

== Semifinals ==
Team 1	Agg.	Team 2	1st leg	2nd leg
Campo Grande	6-0	Uberaba	4-0	2-0
Joinville	3-3	CSA	2-1	1-2

== Finals ==
=== First leg ===
11 April 1982

CSA (Alagoas)	4 – 3	(Rio de Janeiro (state)) Campo Grande
Romel 15', 67', 78'; Zé Carlos 87'		Jerônimo 38' (o.g.); Luiz Paulo 40'; Luizinho 43'

Rei Pelé, Maceió (AL)
Attendance: 16,045
Referee: (Maranhão) Nacor Benedito Arouche

=== Second leg ===
18 April 1982

Campo Grande (Rio de Janeiro (state))	2 – 1	(Alagoas) CSA
Mauro 59'; Tuchê 82'		Ademir 55'

Ítalo del Cima, Rio de Janeiro (RJ)
Attendance: 8,312
Referee: (São Paulo (state)) Dulcídio Vanderlei Boschilla

=== Replay ===
25 April 1982

Campo Grande (Rio de Janeiro (state))	3 – 0	(Alagoas) CSA
Luizinho 30', 60'; Lulinha 44'

Ítalo del Cima, Rio de Janeiro (RJ)
Attendance: 15,567
Referee: (Rio Grande do Sul) Aírton Bernardoni

== Sources ==
- RSSSF
