= Estádio Presidente Vargas =

Estádio Presidente Vargas can refer to:

- Estádio Presidente Vargas (Ceará), a football stadium located in Fortaleza, Ceará, Brazil
- Estádio Presidente Vargas (Paraíba), a football stadium located in Campina Grande, Paraíba, Brazil
