= Treze Futebol Clube =

Brazilian association football club based in Campina Grande, Paraíba, Brazil

Treze
- Full name: Treze Futebol Clube
- Nickname: Galo da Borborema (Borborema's Rooster)
- Founded: 7 September 1925 (100 years ago)
- Ground: Estádio Presidente Vargas; Amigão
- Capacity: 8,885 (Presidente Vargas); 19,000 (Amigão)
- President: Olavo Rodrigues
- Head coach: William De Mattia
- League: Campeonato Brasileiro Série D Campeonato Paraibano
- 2025 2025: Série D, 53rd of 64; Paraibano, 4th of 10
- Website: trezefc.com.br
Home colors	Away colors

Treze Futebol Clube is a Brazilian football team from Campina Grande in Paraíba, founded on 7 September 1925. Historically, the club has competed in the Campeonato Brasileiro Série A several times. Recently, the club has competed only in lower divisions of the national league, the Copa do Brasil, the regional Copa do Nordeste and the Paraíba State Championship

The main rival of Treze is Campinense, another traditional football club from Campina Grande. They have a long-standing rivalry, being collectively known as the Maiorais. This is considered as the most important derby in the countryside of Brazil. There is also a rivalry between Treze and Botafogo (PB), a football club from João Pessoa (Paraíba's capital), due to some historical issues between the two cities.

The club own the Presidente Vargas stadium, which has a theoretical capacity of 12,000, but an approved capacity of 3,800. Games are often played at the state-owned stadium Amigão.

Treze is currently ranked second among Paraíba teams in CBF's national club ranking at 67th place overall. They are the best placed team in the state from outside of Greater João Pessoa.

According to research institutes such as Datavox and GPP, Treze is the local club with the largest number of fans in Paraíba. It is estimated that the club has a fan base of approximately 600,000 supporters just in Paraíba, which represents 62% of local fans' preference, having a larger fan base than the combined total of the second and third largest fan bases in the state.

== History ==
=== Foundation ===
The club was founded on 7 September 1925 by Antônio Fernandes Bioca and twelve other football fans. The group usually played football at a field which is now João Pessoa street. Antônio Fernandes Bioca introduced football to Paraíba, after bringing the first football to the state.

=== First team and First game ===
In 1925, Treze's first team was José Rodolfo, José Casado, Alberto Santos, Zacarias Ribeiro "Cotó" and Plácido Veras "Guiné", Eurico, Zacarias do Ó, José Eloy, Olívio Barreto, Osmundo Lima and José de Castro.

Treze's first official match was played on 1 May 1926, at Campo dos Currais, which is now the site of a public market. Treze beat Palmeiras, an established team from the state capital João Pessoa, 1–0. Plácido Veras (known as Guiné), one of the thirteen founders of the club, scored the goal, to become the scorer of the first official Treze goal.

=== Garrincha ===
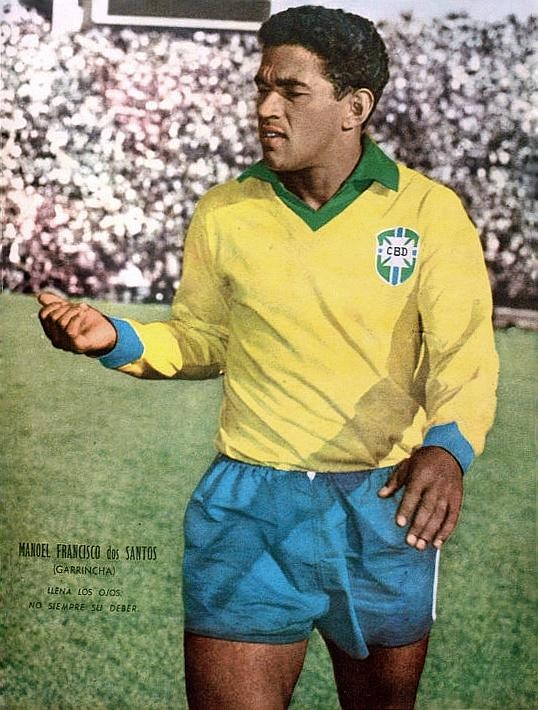
Garrincha played for Treze Futebol Clube in 1968.

In the year 1968, when Treze faced the Argentina U-20 national team and lost 3–2, shortly after the match on 8 February 1968, at Presidente Vargas Stadium, Garrincha donned the Treze Futebol Clube jersey in a friendly against the Romania national team, which was qualified for the 1970 World Cup. He was substituted in the second half, and Treze suffered a 2–1 defeat. Leduar scored the goal for Galo. Treze's lineup featured: Elias; Janca, Antonino, and Leduar; Mané and Nilton; Mané Garrincha, Lima, Chicletes, Pedrinho, and Zé Luiz.

=== State Championship ===
In 1939, Treze became the first team from outside the metropolitan region of João Pessoa to enter the Campeonato Paraibano. They won their first title in 1940 and have a total of 15 championship titles.

In 1966, Treze won the Campeonato Paraibabo undefeated, recording 12 victories and 2 draws, and conceding only 5 goals

=== National competition ===
Treze have competed in the top tier of the Brazilian football league system a total of 9 times, including the combined tournaments held in 1986, 1987 and 2000. They have competed a further 7 times in the second tier, 12 times in the third tier and 5 times in the fourth tier. They have gained promotion twice from Série D, in 2011, when a 5th-placed finish meant they replaced Rio Branco-AC who were excluded from the competition and in 2018.

In 1999, Treze were the first Paraíba State team to progress beyond the first stage of the Copa do Brasil, beating Santa Cruz. Treze lost the first leg 2–3 in Campina Grande, but then won the second leg 4–2 in Recife.

== Current squad ==
As of 25 January 2024, registered for 2024 Campeonato Paraibano.

Note: Flags indicate national team as defined under FIFA eligibility rules; some limited exceptions apply. Players may hold more than one non-FIFA nationality.

No.	Pos.	Nation	Player
—	GK	BRA	Igor Rayan
—	GK	BRA	Nayan
—	GK	BRA	Weyde
—	DF	BRA	Higor
—	DF	BRA	Luiz Fernando
—	DF	BRA	Rubens
—	DF	BRA	Bruno Ferreira
—	DF	BRA	Lucena
—	DF	BRA	Jan Pietter
—	DF	BRA	Pedro Henrique
—	DF	BRA	Rafael Castro
—	DF	BRA	Saimon
—	DF	BRA	Paulo Júnior
—	MF	BRA	Roberto
—	MF	BRA	Gabriel

No.	Pos.	Nation	Player
—	MF	BRA	Edmundo
—	MF	BRA	Erivan
—	MF	BRA	Matheus
—	MF	BRA	Rickelme
—	MF	BRA	Leo Cereja
—	MF	BRA	Pedro
—	MF	BRA	Alex Sandre
—	FW	BRA	Adailson
—	FW	BRA	Jeferson
—	FW	BRA	Will
—	FW	BRA	Jonatha Souza
—	FW	BRA	Vitor Hugo
—	FW	BRA	Lucas
—	FW	BRA	Xandy

== Honours ==
=== Official tournaments ===
State
Competitions	Titles	Seasons
Campeonato Paraibano	17	1940, 1941, 1950, 1966, 1975, 1981, 1982, 1983, 1989, 2000, 2001, 2005, 2006, 2010, 2011, 2020, 2023
Copa Paraíba	1^{s}	2009

- record
- ^{s} shared record

=== Others tournaments ===
==== Inter-state ====
- Torneio Paraíba-Pernambuco (1): 1961
- Torneio Rio Grande do Norte-Paraíba (1): 1980

==== State ====
- Torneio Início da Paraíba (5): 1965, 1974, 1976, 1982, 1985

=== Runners-up ===
- Campeonato Brasileiro Série D (1): 2018
- Campeonato Paraibano (21): 1939, 1942, 1961, 1962, 1963, 1964, 1967, 1968, 1969, 1972, 1973, 1974, 1986, 1988, 1992, 1999, 2004, 2008, 2009, 2013, 2017
- Copa Paraíba (2): 2008, 2011

== Seasons in National League divisions ==
=== Série A ===
Season	Position	Notes
1976	53rd/54	
1977	55th/62	
1979	61st/94	
1982	28th/44	
1983	44th/44	
1984	29th/41	
1986	24th/48	Qualified via parallel Série B tournament
2000	92nd/115	Single parallel tournament for all levels

=== Serie B ===
Season	Position	Notes
1980	58th/64	
1981	37th/48	
1985	7th/24	
1986	3rd/36	Parallel tournament, qualified for Série A 2nd phase
1987	9th/16	Copa João Havelange Group Yellow
1988	22nd/24	
1989	12th/96	
1990	24th/24	
1991	45th/64	

=== Série C ===
Season	Position	Notes
1992	29th/31	
1998	48th/66	
2001	12th/65	
2002	17th/61	
2003	44th/93	
2004	5th/60	
2005	5th/63	
2006	8th/64	
2008	60th/63	
2012	13th/20	
2013	5th/21	
2014	18th/20	Relegated to Série D
2019	16th/20	
2020	17th/20	Relegated to Série D

=== Série D ===
Season	Position	Notes
2009	25/39	
2010	13/40	
2011	5/40	Promoted to Série C to replace Rio Branco-AC
2015	17/40	
2018	2/68	Promoted to Série C
2021	47/68	

== Team colors ==
Treze's colors are black and white. They usually play in black and white vertical stripes, black shorts and black socks. Its away kit is almost all-white, with the exception being its black socks.

== Club name and mascot ==
The name Treze translates Thirteen in English, the number of the founders of the club. The mascot is a rooster as it represents the number 13 in Jogo do Bicho (an illicit gambling game in Brazil).
