= Sérgio Alves =

Brazilian footballer (born 1970)

Personal information
- Full name: Sérgio Alves de Lima
- Date of birth: 23 April 1970 (age 56)
- Place of birth: Recife, Brazil
- Position: Forward

Youth career
- –1989: Central

Senior career*
Years	Team	Apps	(Gls)
1989	Central		
1989–1991	Sport Recife		
1992	Central		
1992–1996	Ceará		
1997	Sion		
1997	Joinville		
1998	ABC		
1998	Fluminense	6	(1)
1998	América de Natal		
1999	ABC		
2000–2001	Santa Cruz		
2001	ABC		
2001	Ceará		
2002	Bahia		
2002	Guarani		
2003	Ponte Preta		
2003–2004	Ceará		
2004	Brasiliense		
2005	ABC		
2005	CRB		
2006	Botafogo-PB		
2006	São Gonçalo-RN		
2006–2007	Ferroviário		
2007	Potiguar de Mossoró		
2008	Barras		
2008	Salgueiro		
2008	Guarany de Sobral		
2008–2010	Ceará		
2013	Pacatuba		

Managerial career
- 2012: Ceará (youth)
- 2013: Ferroviário
- 2017: Tiradentes-CE
- 2017: Caucaia
- 2019–2021: Ceará (women)
- 2021: Maranguape
- * Club domestic league appearances and goals as of 27 October 2023

Sérgio Alves de Lima (born 23 April 1970), better known as Sérgio Alves, is a Brazilian former professional footballer and manager who played as a forward.

== Career ==
Sérgio Alves made history in several football clubs in the northeast region of Brazil, especially Ceará, ABC and Bahia, clubs where he is in the hall of fame. He became notable for the clubs where he performed incredible feats, such as goals in the last minute, scoring frequently in derbies against rivals, bicycle goals. For Ceará he played 309 matches and scored 142 goals. For ABC, he became the top scorer in classics against América de Natal, with 14 goals. At Bahia he was decisive in the final of the 2002 Copa do Nordeste, exactly against the club's great rival, EC Vitória. He also won titles with smaller teams, such as Barras-PI and Guarany de Sobral.

== Managerial career ==
He started as a coach in the youth sectors of Ceará. In 2013, after a brief spell as a player at Pacatuba, he took over at Ferroviário. In 2017, it was time to train Tiradentes-CE and Caucaia. On the Ceará women's team, where Sérgio Alves won the state championship in 2019. His last job was on Maranguape.

== Honours ==
=== Player ===
Sport

- Campeonato Brasileiro Série B: 1990

Ceará

- Campeonato Cearense: 1993, 1996

ABC

- Campeonato Potiguar: 1998, 1999, 2005

Bahia

- Copa do Nordeste: 2002

Barras

- Campeonato Piauiense: 2008

Guarany de Sobral

- Campeonato Cearense Série B: 2008

Individual

- 2001 Campeonato Brasileiro Série B top scorer: 21 goals
- 2002 Copa do Nordeste top scorer: 13 goals
- Campeonato Potiguar top scorer: 1998, 1999, 2001, 2005

=== Manager ===
Ceará U20

- Campeonato Cearense Sub-20: 2012

Ceará (women)

- Campeonato Cearense de Futebol Feminino: 2019
