= 1986 Campeonato Brasileiro Série B =

Campeonato Brasileiro Série B
- Season: 1986
- Champions: Treze; Central; Inter de Limeira; Criciúma
- Promoted: Treze; Central; Inter de Limeira; Criciúma

The 1986 Campeonato Brasileiro Série B, the second level of the Campeonato Brasileiro Série A, was a parallel competition organized by the CBF. The competition had 36 clubs and the winners of each one of the four groups were promoted to the same season's Série A.

== Standings ==
=== Group E ===
Pos	Team	Pld	W	D	L	GF	GA	GD	Pts	Qualification
1	Treze (C)	8	5	2	1	8	2	+6	12	Promoted to Série A 1986
2	Maranhão	8	4	2	2	10	7	+3	10	Runner-up
3	Rio Negro	8	3	4	1	5	2	+3	10	
4	Moto Club	8	4	1	3	9	10	−1	9	
5	América	8	3	3	2	9	3	+6	9	
6	Guarany de Sobral	8	3	2	3	8	9	−1	8	
7	Ferroviário	8	1	4	3	7	8	−1	6	
8	Sport Belém	8	1	2	5	5	11	−6	4	
9	Flamengo	8	0	4	4	6	15	−9	4	

(C) Group Champion

=== Group F ===
Pos	Team	Pld	W	D	L	GF	GA	GD	Pts	Qualification
1	Central (C)	8	5	1	2	11	6	+5	11 (Note: Central finished in the first place as they beat Americano 2-0.)	Promoted to Série A 1986
2	Americano	8	5	1	2	11	6	+5	11	Runner-up
3	Goytacaz	8	4	1	3	12	11	+1	9	
4	Desportiva	7	3	2	2	9	7	+2	8	
5	CRB	8	3	2	3	6	7	−1	8	
6	Catuense	8	2	4	2	9	9	0	8	
7	Taguatinga	8	3	1	4	14	12	+2	7	
8	Fluminense de Feira	8	1	4	3	7	12	−5	6	
9	Confiança	8	1	2	5	5	14	−9	4	

(C) Group Champion

=== Group G ===
Pos	Team	Pld	W	D	L	GF	GA	GD	Pts	Qualification
1	Inter de Limeira (C)	8	6	1	1	16	3	+13	13	Promoted to Série A 1986
2	Juventus	8	4	4	0	8	2	+6	11 (Note: 1 point deducted?)	Runner-up
3	Santo André	8	3	3	2	8	8	0	9	
4	Anápolis	8	3	2	3	8	9	−1	8	
5	Itumbiara	8	1	6	1	6	7	−1	8	
6	América	8	2	3	3	10	9	+1	7	
7	Ubiratan	7	1	4	2	5	6	−1	6 (Note: The game between Ubiratan and Uberlândia was not played.)	
8	Mixto	8	1	2	5	9	21	−12	4	
9	Uberlândia	7	0	3	4	2	7	−5	3	

(C) Group Champion

=== Group H ===
Pos	Team	Pld	W	D	L	GF	GA	GD	Pts	Qualification
1	Criciúma (C)	8	6	2	0	12	4	+8	14	Promoted to Série A 1986
2	Marcílio Dias	8	4	2	2	8	6	+2	10	Runner-up
3	Pinheiros	8	3	3	2	11	9	+2	9	
4	Londrina	8	3	3	2	9	8	+1	9	
5	Juventude	8	2	4	2	7	5	+2	8	
6	Avaí	8	3	1	4	5	6	−1	7	
7	Novo Hamburgo	8	3	1	4	8	11	−3	7	
8	Brasil de Pelotas	8	1	2	5	8	13	−5	4	
9	Cascavel	8	0	4	4	6	12	−6	4	

(C) Group Champion
