= Futuro Bem Próximo Atlético Clube =

Futuro Bem Próximo
- Full name: Futuro Bem Próximo Atlético Clube
- Founded: September 6, 2000
- Ground: Estádio Mário Castanho, Rio de Janeiro, Rio de Janeiro state, Brazil
- Capacity: 18,000
Home colours	Away colours

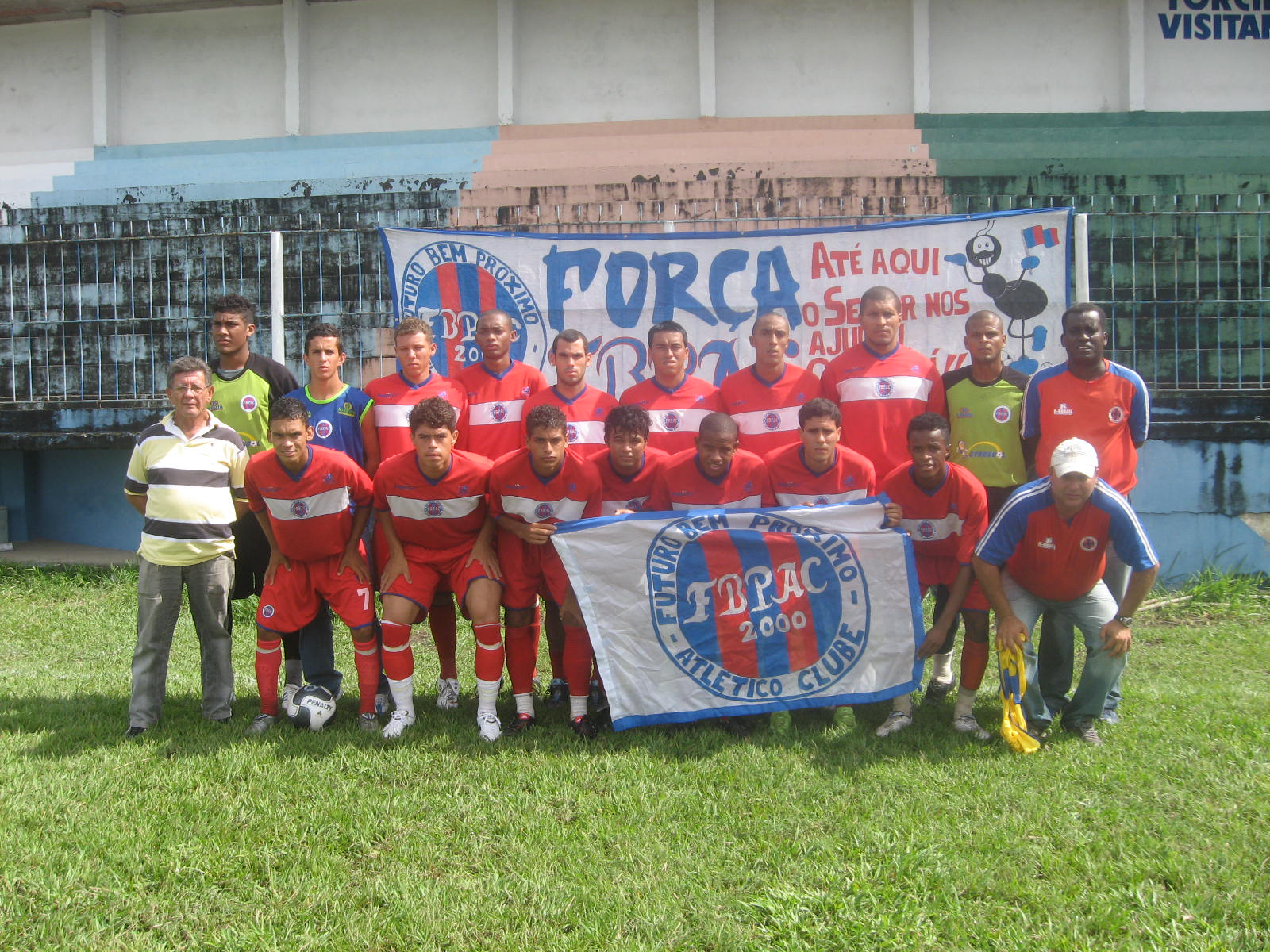
Team photo from the 2010 season

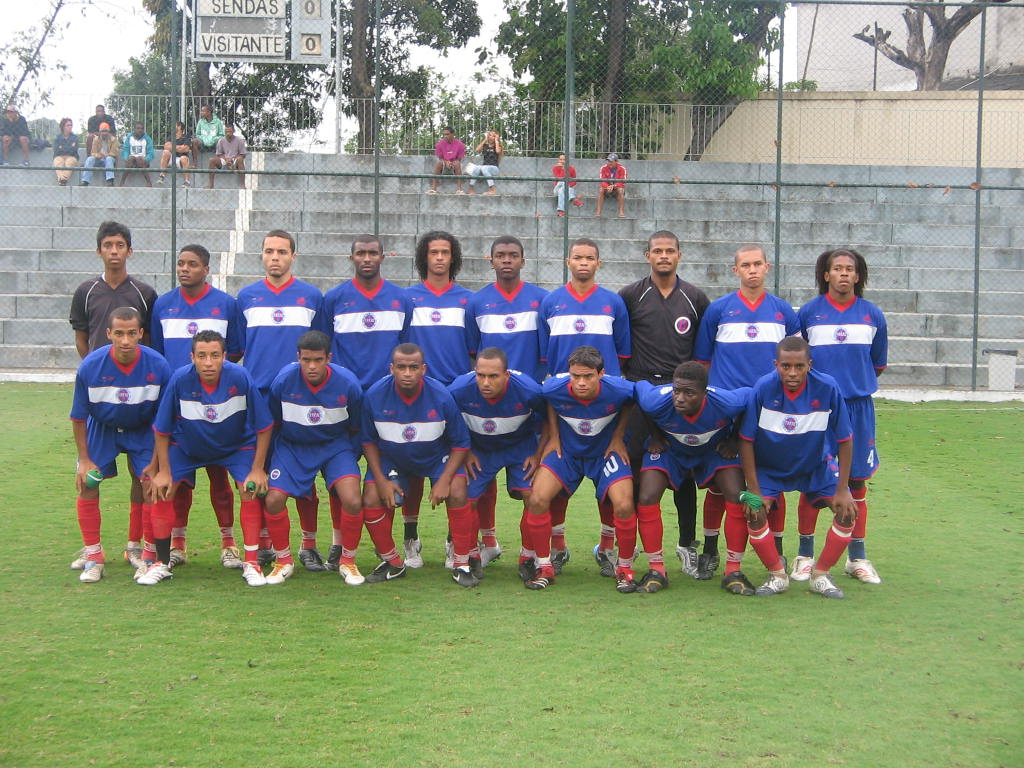
Team photo from the 2007 season

Futuro Bem Próximo Atlético Clube, commonly known as Futuro Bem Próximo, is a Brazilian football club based in Rio de Janeiro, Rio de Janeiro state.

== History ==
The club was founded on September 6, 2000, in Niterói, eventually moving is headquarters to Campo Grande neighborhood, Rio de Janeiro.

== Stadium ==
Futuro Bem Próximo Atlético Clube play their home games at Estádio Ítalo del Cima. The stadium has a maximum capacity of 18,000 people.
