= Vicente Lage =

Brazilian football manager (1933–2026)

Personal information
- Full name: Vicente de Paula Lage
- Date of birth: 10 June 1933
- Place of birth: Itabira, Minas Gerais, Brazil
- Date of death: 29 June 2026 (aged 93)
- Place of death: Belo Horizonte, Minas Gerais, Brazil

Senior career*
Years	Team	Apps	(Gls)
- Valerio

Managerial career
- 1974: Nacional-AM
- 1975: América Mineiro
- 1978: América Mineiro
- 1980: Valerio
- 1981: Cruzeiro
- 1981: Nacional-AM
- 1982–1983: Cruzeiro
- 1983–1984: Uberlândia
- 1985: Atlético Mineiro
- 1986: América Mineiro
- 1988–1989: Democrata-SL
- * Club domestic league appearances and goals

Vicente de Paula Lage (10 June 1933 – 29 June 2026), also known by the nickname Cento e Nove (109), was a Brazilian football manager.

== Career ==
As a player, Lage played only for Valeriodoce EC of Itabira. He gained greater prominence as a coach, managing major teams in Minas Gerais and winning the Taça de Prata with Uberlândia in 1984 and the state championship with Atlético Mineiro in 1985.

== Death ==
Lage died on 29 June 2026, at the age of 93.

== Honours ==
Uberlândia

- Campeonato Brasileiro Série B: 1984

Atlético Mineiro

- Campeonato Mineiro: 1985
