= 2002 Campeonato Brasileiro Série C =

Campeonato Brasileiro Série C
- Season: 2002
- Champions: Brasiliense
- Promoted: Brasiliense; Marília
- Matches: 244
- Goals: 589 (2.41 per match)
- Top goalscorer: 11 goals: Túlio (Brasiliense); Wellington Dias (Brasiliense)
- Biggest home win: Santa Inês (pt) 8-0 Tocantins (September 8, 2002)
- Biggest away win: Tocantins 0-4 Santa Inês (pt) (September 15, 2002); Ferroviária 0-4 Rio Branco-SP (September 22, 2002); Santo André 0-4 Marília (September 22, 2002); CSA 0-4 ABC (October 13, 2002)

The football (soccer) Campeonato Brasileiro Série C 2002, the third level of Brazilian National League, was played from August 24 to December 1, 2002. The competition had 65 clubs and two of them were promoted to Série B.

Brasiliense finished the final phase group with most points and was declared 2002 Brazilian Série C champions, claiming the promotion to the 2003 Série B along with Marília, the runners-up.

== Stages of the competition ==
=== First stage ===
The first two teams in each group qualifies to the second stage.

Group 1 (AC-AM-RO-RR)

Pos	Team	Pld	W	D	L	GF	GA	GD	Pts	Qualification
1	(Amazonas (Brazilian state)) Nacional-AM	8	7	1	0	19	8	+11	22	Qualified for the second stage
2	Atlético Roraima	8	3	3	2	16	9	+7	12	Qualified for the second stage
3	(Amazonas (Brazilian state)) Rio Negro	8	2	3	3	10	15	−5	9	
4	(Rondônia) Ji-Paraná	8	2	2	4	6	11	−5	8	
5	(Acre (state)) Andirá	8	0	3	5	8	16	−8	3	

Source: rsssf.com

Group 2 (AP-PA-TO)

Pos	Team	Pld	W	D	L	GF	GA	GD	Pts	Qualification
1	(Pará) Tuna Luso	6	3	2	1	8	5	+3	11	Qualified for the second stage
2	(Tocantins) Tocantinópolis	6	3	1	2	10	9	+1	10	Qualified for the second stage
3	(Amapá) Ypiranga	6	3	0	3	5	6	−1	9	
4	(Pará) Águia de Marabá	6	1	1	4	6	9	−3	4	

Source: rsssf.com

Group 3 (MA)

Pos	Team	Pld	W	D	L	GF	GA	GD	Pts	Qualification
1	(Maranhão) Santa Inês	4	4	0	0	17	0	+17	12	Qualified for the second stage
2	(Maranhão) Tocantins	4	1	1	2	4	15	−11	4	Qualified for the second stage
3	(Maranhão) Imperatriz	4	0	1	3	3	9	−6	1	

Source: rsssf.com

Note: Viana withdrew before the start of the championship.

Group 4 (CE-MA-PI)

Pos	Team	Pld	W	D	L	GF	GA	GD	Pts	Qualification
1	(Ceará) Ferroviário-CE	4	2	2	0	3	1	+2	8	Qualified for the second stage
2	(Piauí) River	4	1	2	1	5	4	+1	5	Qualified for the second stage
3	Maranhão	4	0	2	2	2	5	−3	2	

Source: rsssf.com

Note: Moto Club withdrew before the start of the championship.

Group 5 (PB-RN)

Pos	Team	Pld	W	D	L	GF	GA	GD	Pts	Qualification
1	(Paraíba) Treze	6	4	2	0	10	4	+6	14	Qualified for the second stage
2	(Rio Grande do Norte) ABC	6	2	3	1	8	6	+2	9	Qualified for the second stage
3	(Paraíba) Atlético Cajazeirense (Note: Atlético Cajazeirense was awarded a berth in the championship after Central withdrew.)	6	1	3	2	7	9	−2	6	
4	(Paraíba) Botafogo-PB	6	0	2	4	8	14	−6	2	

Source: rsssf.com
Notes:

Group 6 (AL-SE)

Pos	Team	Pld	W	D	L	GF	GA	GD	Pts	Qualification
1	(Sergipe) Confiança	6	3	2	1	7	4	+3	11	Qualified for the second stage
2	(Alagoas) CSA	6	3	2	1	8	7	+1	11	Qualified for the second stage
3	(Alagoas) Corinthians-AL	6	1	3	2	5	5	0	6	
4	Sergipe	6	0	3	3	1	5	−4	3	

Source: rsssf.com

Group 7 (BA-SE)

Pos	Team	Pld	W	D	L	GF	GA	GD	Pts	Qualification
1	(Sergipe) Itabaiana	6	3	1	2	8	4	+4	10	Qualified for the second stage
2	(Bahia) Fluminense de Feira	6	2	3	1	6	5	+1	9	Qualified for the second stage
3	(Bahia) Palmeiras Nordeste	6	2	3	1	3	3	0	9	
4	(Bahia) Colo Colo-BA	6	0	3	3	3	8	−5	3	

Source: rsssf.com

Group 8 (ES-MG)

Pos	Team	Pld	W	D	L	GF	GA	GD	Pts	Qualification
1	(Minas Gerais) Ipatinga	4	1	3	0	3	2	+1	6	Qualified for the second stage
2	(Minas Gerais) Tupi	4	1	2	1	4	2	+2	5	Qualified for the second stage
3	(Espírito Santo) Rio Branco-ES	4	1	1	2	2	5	−3	4	

Source: rsssf.com

Note: Desportiva withdrew before the start of the championship.

Group 9 (DF-GO)

Pos	Team	Pld	W	D	L	GF	GA	GD	Pts	Qualification
1	(Federal District (Brazil)) Brasiliense	6	4	1	1	16	6	+10	13	Qualified for the second stage
2	(Goiás) Anápolis	6	4	0	2	9	6	+3	12	Qualified for the second stage
3	(Federal District (Brazil)) CFZ-DF	6	3	1	2	8	9	−1	10	
4	(Goiás) Grêmio Inhumense	6	0	0	6	5	17	−12	0	

Source: rsssf.com

Group 10 (GO-MT-MS)

Pos	Team	Pld	W	D	L	GF	GA	GD	Pts	Qualification
1	(Goiás) Novo Horizonte	4	1	3	0	4	3	+1	6	Qualified for the second stage
2	(Mato Grosso do Sul) CENE	4	0	4	0	4	4	0	4	Qualified for the second stage
3	(Mato Grosso) União Rondonópolis	4	0	3	1	5	6	−1	3	

Source: rsssf.com

Note: Comercial-MS withdrew before the start of the championship

Group 11 (GO-MG)

Pos	Team	Pld	W	D	L	GF	GA	GD	Pts	Qualification
1	(Minas Gerais) Villa Nova	6	3	0	3	7	8	−1	9	Qualified for the second stage
2	(Goiás) Atlético-GO	6	2	3	1	7	6	+1	9	Qualified for the second stage
3	(Minas Gerais) Uberlândia	6	2	2	2	12	11	+1	8	
4	(Goiás) Goiânia	6	1	3	2	7	8	−1	6	

Source: rsssf.com

Group 12 (RJ)

Pos	Team	Pld	W	D	L	GF	GA	GD	Pts	Qualification
1	(Rio de Janeiro (state)) Olaria	6	3	3	0	9	6	+3	12	Qualified for the second stage
2	(Rio de Janeiro (state)) Bangu	6	2	3	1	11	7	+4	9	Qualified for the second stage
3	(Rio de Janeiro (state)) Volta Redonda	6	1	2	3	5	9	−4	5	
4	(Rio de Janeiro (state)) América-RJ	6	0	4	2	6	9	−3	4	

Source: rsssf.com

Group 13 (SP)

Pos	Team	Pld	W	D	L	GF	GA	GD	Pts	Qualification
1	(São Paulo (state)) Atlético Sorocaba	6	1	5	0	4	3	+1	8	Qualified for the second stage
2	(São Paulo (state)) Ituano	6	1	4	1	6	5	+1	7	Qualified for the second stage
3	(São Paulo (state)) Comercial-SP	6	1	4	1	6	5	+1	7	
4	(São Paulo (state)) Internacional de Limeira	6	1	3	2	7	10	−3	6	

Source: rsssf.com

Group 14 (SP)

Pos	Team	Pld	W	D	L	GF	GA	GD	Pts	Qualification
1	(São Paulo (state)) Rio Branco-SP	6	4	1	1	9	2	+7	13	Qualified for the second stage
2	(São Paulo (state)) Marília	6	3	2	1	8	2	+6	11	Qualified for the second stage
3	(São Paulo (state)) Ferroviária	6	1	4	1	4	6	−2	7	
4	(São Paulo (state)) Santo André	6	0	1	5	0	11	−11	1	

Source: rsssf.com

Group 15 (PR)

Pos	Team	Pld	W	D	L	GF	GA	GD	Pts	Qualification
1	(Paraná (state)) Iraty	6	4	1	1	8	4	+4	13	Qualified for the second stage
2	(Paraná (state)) União Bandeirante	6	2	2	2	8	5	+3	8	Qualified for the second stage
3	(Paraná (state)) Ponta Grossa	6	1	3	2	6	9	−3	6	
4	(Paraná (state)) Grêmio Maringá	6	1	2	3	3	7	−4	5	

Source: rsssf.com

Group 16 (RS-SC)

Pos	Team	Pld	W	D	L	GF	GA	GD	Pts	Qualification
1	(Rio Grande do Sul) Ulbra	6	5	0	1	7	2	+5	15	Qualified for the second stage
2	(Rio Grande do Sul) Brasil de Pelotas	6	4	1	1	9	5	+4	13	Qualified for the second stage
3	(Rio Grande do Sul) São Gabriel	6	0	3	3	5	8	−3	3	
4	(Santa Catarina (state)) Tubarão	6	0	2	4	5	11	−6	2	

Source: rsssf.com

=== Second stage ===
[

Team 1	Agg.	Team 2	1st leg	2nd leg
Tocantinópolis	1–2	Nacional-AM	1-0	0–2
Atlético Roraima	3–1	Tuna Luso	2-1	1-0
River	0–0(p)	Santa Inês-MA (pt)	0–0	0–0
Tocantins	1–9	Ferroviário-CE	1–2	0–7
CSA	6–2	Treze	6–1	0–1
ABC	2–2(p)	Confiança	2–1	0-1
Tupi	4–2	Itabaiana	4-1	0-1
Fluminense de Feira	1–5	Ipatinga	1-3	0–2
Anápolis	4-2	Novo Horizonte	2–2	2–0
CENE	5–5(p)	Brasiliense	3–4	2–1
Bangu	1–5	Villa Nova	1–3	0–2
Atlético-GO	1–1(p)	Olaria	0–0	1–1
Marília	0–0(p)	Atlético Sorocaba	0–0	0-0
Ituano	2–3	Rio Branco-SP	2–2	0-1
Brasil de Pelotas	2–2(p)	Iraty	2–1	0–1
União Bandeirante	3–4	Ulbra	3-2	0-2

=== Third stage ===
Team 1	Agg.	Team 2	1st leg	2nd leg
Tupi	2–3	Ipatinga	2–1	0–2
Olaria	0-0(p)	Villa Nova	0–0	0-0
River	3–4	Ferroviário-CE	3–2	0–2
CSA	1-8	ABC	1-4	0-4
Anápolis	0-2	Brasiliense	0-0	0-2
Marília	4-2	Rio Branco-SP	2–0	2-2
Ulbra	1-0	Iraty	1-0	0-0
Atlético Roraima	5-7	Nacional-AM	4–3	1-4

=== Quarterfinals ===
Team 1	Agg.	Team 2	1st leg	2nd leg
Ipatinga	1-0	ABC	1-0	0-0
Nacional-AM	5-4	Ferroviário	2-1	3-3
Villa Nova	1-4	Brasiliense	1-2	0-2
Ulbra	3-6	Marília	2-2	1-4

=== Final stage ===
Pos	Team	Pld	W	D	L	GF	GA	GD	Pts	BSL	MAR	IPA	NAC
1	Brasiliense (P)	6	3	3	0	9	5	+4	12		1–1	1–1	2–0
2	Marília (P)	6	3	2	1	11	7	+4	11	1–1		2–1	3–1
3	Ipatinga	6	1	2	3	8	10	−2	5	2–3	3–2		1–1
4	Nacional-AM	6	1	1	4	3	9	−6	4	0–1	0–2	1–0	

Source: rsssf.com
(P) Promoted to Série B 2003

== Sources ==
- rsssf.com
