= Luizinho das Arábias =

Brazilian footballer (1957–1989)

Personal information
- Full name: Luiz Alberto Duarte dos Santos
- Date of birth: 13 November 1957
- Place of birth: Petrópolis, Brazil
- Date of death: 8 May 1989 (aged 31)
- Place of death: Belém, Brazil
- Height: 1.79 m (5 ft 10 in)
- Position: Forward

Youth career
- Portuguesa-RJ

Senior career*
Years	Team	Apps	(Gls)
1975–1976	Fortaleza		
1977–1978	Portuguesa-RJ		
1977–1978	→ Juventude (loan)		
1979	Flamengo		
1979–1980	Al Nassr		
1980	Flamengo		
1981	Bangu		
1981–1983	Campo Grande-RJ		
1983	Fortaleza		
1984	Bangu		
1984	Botafogo		
1985	Desportiva-ES		
1985–1986	Ferroviário		
1986	XV de Jaú		
1987	Fortaleza		
1987	Paysandu		
1987–1988	Itaperuna		
1988	Ferroviário		
1988	Paysandu		
1989	Remo		
- * Club domestic league appearances and goals

Luiz Alberto Duarte dos Santos (13 November 1957 – 8 May 1989), better known as Luizinho das Arábias, was a Brazilian professional footballer who played as a forward.

== Career ==
Luizinho began his career at the age of 13, in the youth sectors of AA Portuguesa. He gave up football to study physical education in Fortaleza, but went back and resumed his career at Fortaleza EC. Back in Rio de Janeiro, he once again defended Portuguesa da Ilha, as well as Juventude, when he was loaned and played in the Brazilian Championship.

In 1979 he was hired by Flamengo, the club where he won a third title in Rio. On 6 April 1979, he replaced Pelé, who defended Flamengo in a friendly match against Atlético Mineiro, which aimed to raise funds for those left homeless by the rains in Minas Gerais. The match, which was 1–1 at half-time, ended 5–1 for Flamengo, with a historic performance from Luizinho.

He was later signed by Al Nassr in Saudi Arabia, and scored the club's title-winning goal in the Saudi championship against Al Hilal. This is how he gained the nickname "Luizinho das Arabias", although in 1980 he returned to Flamengo because he could not adapt to the country.

At Campo Grande, he was champion and top scorer in the 1982 Campeonato Brasileiro Série B. The following year, he had another spell at Fortaleza, and again he was champion and top scorer, this time in the Ceará championship. He also played for Bangu and Botafogo, before going to Pará, where he defended Paysandu and was champion in 1987. He would still defend Remo, the club where he played his last game, 24 April 1989, against AC Izabelense.

== Death ==
Luizinho began experiencing chest pains months before he died. At the time, he defended Fortaleza. He went for a consultation and the doctor who attended to him did not give a favorable opinion on pursuing his career. He said that more detailed tests should be carried out. In vain, a year later he was traded to Remo. It was in his apartment in Belém that Luisinho died. He suffered a massive heart attack and did not appear at the club for two days. Just then the door to the place where he lived was broken into. Unfortunately, the death was confirmed. Luizinho was found lying lifeless on the bed. His body is buried in the Irajá cemetery, in Rio de Janeiro.

== Honours ==
Flamengo

- Campeonato Carioca: 1979, 1979 (extra), 1980
- Taça Guanabara: 1979, 1980

Al-Nassr

- Saudi Premier League: 1979–80

Campo Grande

- Campeonato Brasileiro Série B: 1982

Fortaleza

- Campeonato Cearense: 1983

Paysandu

- Campeonato Paraense: 1987

Ferroviário

- Campeonato Cearense: 1988

Individual

- 1982 Campeonato Brasileiro Série B top scorer: 10 goals
- 1983 Campeonato Cearense top scorer: 33 goals
