= Estádio Ítalo Del Cima =

Football stadium in Campo Grande, Rio de Janeiro, Brazil

Coordinates: 22°54′02.12″S 43°32′43.96″W

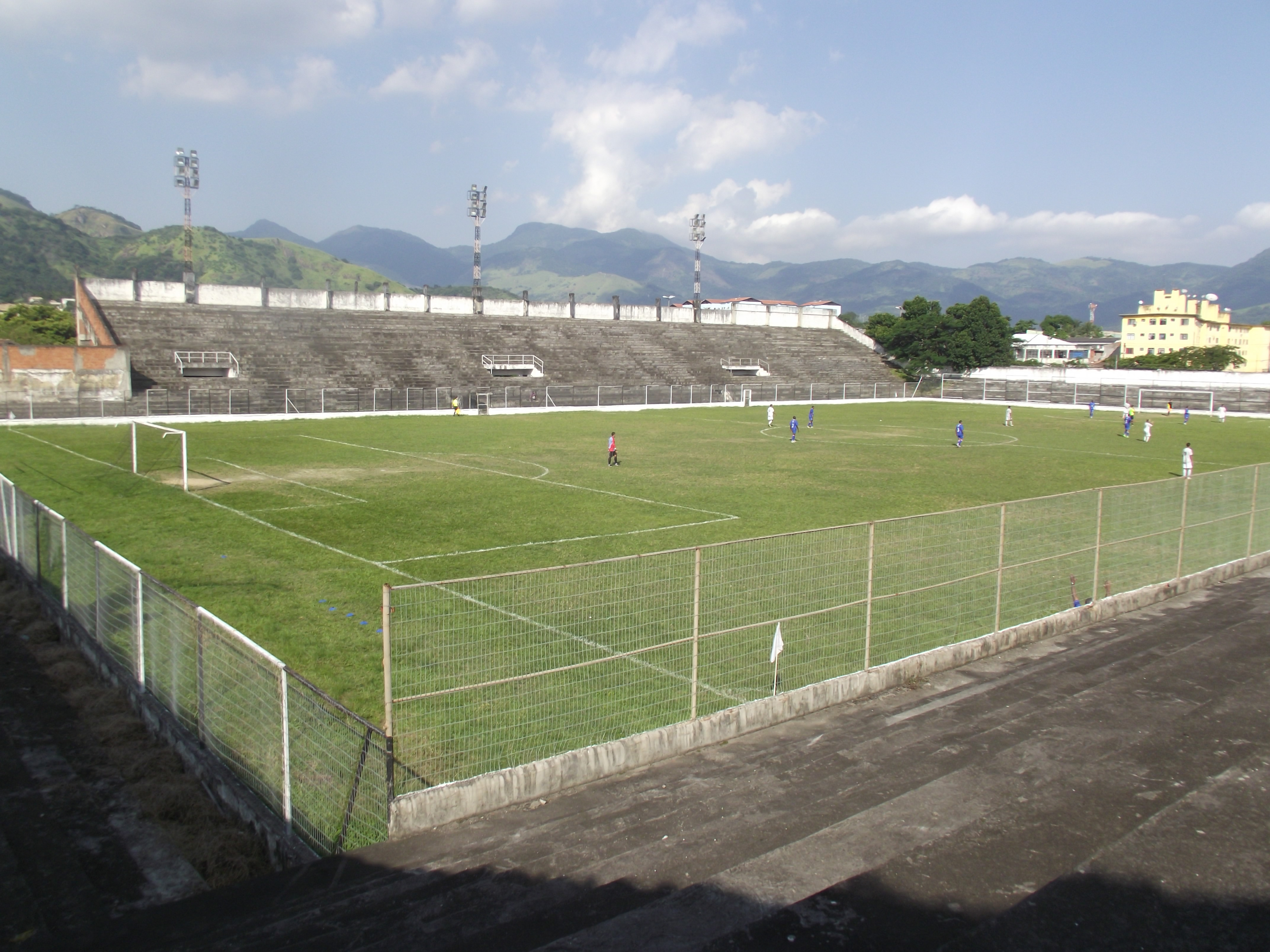
- Interactive map of Estádio Ítalo Del Cima
- Full name: Estádio Ítalo del Cima
- Location: Campo Grande, Rio de Janeiro,
- Owner: Campo Grande Atlético Clube
- Surface: Grass

Tenant
- Campo Grande

The Estádio Ítalo Del Cima is a football stadium inaugurated on April 29, 1960 in Campo Grande neighborhood, Rio de Janeiro, Rio de Janeiro (state), with a maximum capacity of 18,000 people. The stadium is owned by Campo Grande Atlético Clube, and it is also the home stadium of Futuro Bem Próximo Atlético Clube. Its formal name honors del Cima family.

== History ==
The stadium was built in a groundplot donated by Ítalo Del Cima family. The stadium was inaugurated in 1960. Originally, Ítalo Del Cima was a covered stadium, but a windstorm, in 1972, destroyed part of the stadium covering. Later only the members' seats of the stadium were covered.

The inaugural match was played on April 29, 1960, when Campo Grande beat Oriente 2–0. The first goal of the stadium was scored by Campo Grande's Naldo Pires.

The stadium's attendance record currently stands at 16,842, set on April 21, 1982 when Campo Grande beat CSA 3–0, in the final game of the Campeonato Brasileiro Série B (Silver Trophy).
