= Estádio Presidente Vargas (Paraíba) =

Football stadium in Campina Grande, Paraíba, Brazil

Coordinates: 7°13′40″S 35°53′41″W

Presidente Vargas
- PV
- Interactive map of Presidente Vargas
- Full name: Estádio Presidente Vargas
- Location: Campina Grande, Paraíba, Brazil
- Owner: Treze Futebol Clube
- Operator: Treze Futebol Clube
- Capacity: 8,800
- Surface: Grass
- Field size: 110 x 75 m

Construction
- Built: 1937 to 1940
- Opened: 17 March 1940

Tenant
- Treze Futebol Clube

Estádio Presidente Vargas is a multi-use stadium located in Campina Grande, Brazil. It is used mostly for football matches and hosts the home matches of Treze Futebol Clube. The stadium has a maximum capacity of 12,000 people and was built in 1940.
