= Estádio Caio Martins =

Football stadium

Coordinates: 22°54′02″S 43°06′21″W

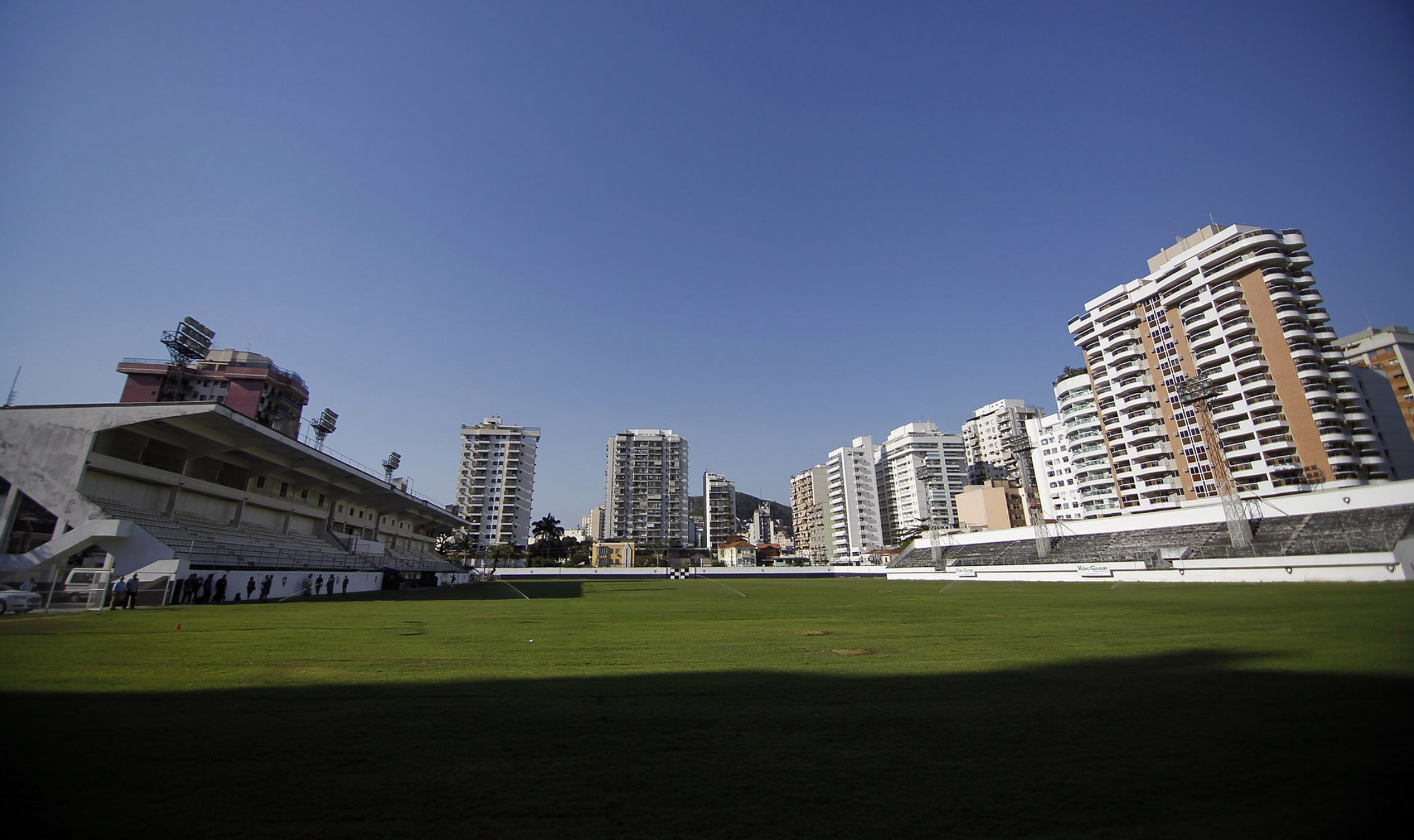
Caio Martins Stadium recently

Estádio Caio Martins, sometimes called Estádio Mestre Ziza, is a football stadium in Niterói, Rio de Janeiro state, Brazil. The stadium holds 12,000 people. It was built in 1941. The stadium is owned by the Rio de Janeiro state government.

The stadium's name honors Caio Vianna Martins. In 1938 15-year-old Scout Martins, along with many other passengers, was seriously injured in a train accident, but refused the offer of a stretcher, saying that others needed it more than he. Martins walked to the aid location but died soon after. Nowadays, the stadium is also home for the 15th Scout Group Martim Afonso (Portuguese:15º Grupo Escoteiro Martim Afonso), one of the oldest groups in Niterói, with more than 55 years.

The nickname Mestre Ziza, meaning Master Ziza, honors the late Zizinho, a Brazilian footballer who played the 1950 FIFA World Cup.

== History ==
The stadium was built under the administration of then-Rio de Janeiro state Governor Ernâni do Amaral Peixoto, who wanted a team from Niterói club competing in the Campeonato Carioca.

The inaugural match was played on July 20, 1941, when Vasco da Gama beat Canto do Rio Futebol Clube 3-1. The first goal of the stadium was scored by Vasco's Gonzalez.

In 1938, Botafogo inaugurated Estádio General Severiano, but the low maximum capacity of that stadium was the main reason why, some time later, Botafogo adopted Caio Martins as their home ground against minor clubs (Estádio do Maracanã is the ground used against the big clubs).

The stadium's attendance record currently stands at 13,160 people, set on April 26, 1992 when Botafogo beat Santos 2-0.

In 2003 the stadium was renovated temporarily with the capacity expanded to 15,000.
