= Campeonato Brasileiro Série B =

Second level football league in Brazil

- Founded: 1971; 55 years ago
- Country: Brazil
- Confederation: CONMEBOL
- Number of clubs: 20
- Level on pyramid: 2
- Promotion to: Série A
- Relegation to: Série C
- Domestic cup: Copa do Brasil (third stage)
- Current champions: Novorizontino (1st title) (2026)
- Most championships: Coritiba (3 titles)
- Broadcasters: ESPN; Disney+ RedeTV! Desimpedidos; Kwai; SportyNet
- Website: Official website
- Current: 2026 Campeonato Brasileiro Série B

The Campeonato Brasileiro Série B (commonly referred to as the Brasileirão Série B, the Série B or the Brazilian Série B to distinguish it from Italy's Serie B), and currently officially called Brasileirão Série B Superbet for sponsorship reasons) is the second tier of the Brazilian football league system, which is organized by the Brazilian Football Confederation.

The competition was played for the first time in 1971, and for a long time, the competition format was inconsistent, with changes happening frequently. Also, there were years where the competition was not played at all.

Since 2006 it has been contested by 20 teams in a double round-robin format with 38 matches. From 2006 to 2025, the top four teams each season were promoted to the Campeonato Brasileiro Série A group and the bottom four teams were relegated to the Campeonato Brasileiro Série C. Beginning in 2026 a promotion playoff system was implemented where the top two teams receive automatic promotion, the third place team plays the sixth place team for a promotion spot, and the fourth place team plays the fifth place team for a promotion spot.

== 2026 Série B teams ==
Team	Home city	State	Stadium	Capacity
América Mineiro	Belo Horizonte	Minas Gerais	Arena Independência	23,018
Athletic	São João del-Rei	Minas Gerais	Arena Sicredi	6,000
Atlético Goianiense	Goiânia	Goiás	Antônio Accioly	12,500
Avaí	Florianópolis	Santa Catarina	Ressacada	17,826
Botafogo-SP	Ribeirão Preto	São Paulo	Santa Cruz	29,292
Ceará	Fortaleza	Ceará	Castelão	57,876
CRB	Maceió	Alagoas	Rei Pelé	17,126
Criciúma	Criciúma	Santa Catarina	Heriberto Hülse	19,225
Cuiabá	Cuiabá	Mato Grosso	Arena Pantanal	44,000
Fortaleza	Fortaleza	Ceará	Castelão	57,876
Goiás	Goiânia	Goiás	Estádio da Serrinha	14,450
Juventude	Caxias do Sul	Rio Grande do Sul	Alfredo Jaconi	19,924
Londrina	Londrina	Paraná	Estádio do Café	31,000
Náutico	Recife	Pernambuco	Aflitos	22,856
Novorizontino	Novo Horizonte	São Paulo	Doutor Jorge Ismael de Biasi	16,000
Operário Ferroviário	Ponta Grossa	Paraná	Germano Krüger	10,632
Ponte Preta	Campinas	São Paulo	Moisés Lucarelli	19,728
São Bernardo	São Bernardo do Campo	São Paulo	1º de Maio	15,159
Sport	Recife	Pernambuco	Ilha do Retiro	32,983
Vila Nova	Goiânia	Goiás	Onésio Brasileiro Alvarenga	6,500

== Champions of Série B ==
=== Official champions ===
Below is the table of the Campeonato Brasileiro Série B champions according to the Brazilian Football Confederation:

Mixed formats

From 1971 to 2005, the format of the competition and the number of promoted and relegated teams were inconsistent. Below is a list of the champions and runners up of the competition during that time:

Ed.	Season	Champion	Runner-up
1	1971	(Minas Gerais) Villa Nova	(Pará) Remo
2	1972	(Maranhão) Sampaio Corrêa	(Paraíba) Campinense
–	1973−1979	Not held	
3	1980	(Paraná (state)) Londrina	(Alagoas) CSA
4	1981	(São Paulo (state)) Guarani	(Goiás) Anapolina
5	1982	(Rio de Janeiro (state)) Campo Grande	(Alagoas) CSA
6	1983	(São Paulo (state)) Juventus	(Alagoas) CSA
7	1984	(Minas Gerais) Uberlândia	(Pará) Remo
8	1985	(Pará) Tuna Luso	(Rio de Janeiro (state)) Goytacaz
–	1986	Not held (See 1986 Torneio Paralelo)	
–	1987	Not held (See Copa União Blue and White Modules)	
9	1988	(São Paulo (state)) Inter de Limeira	(Pernambuco) Náutico
10	1989	(São Paulo (state)) Bragantino	(São Paulo (state)) São José
11	1990	(Pernambuco) Sport	(Paraná (state)) Atlético Paranaense
12	1991	(Pará) Paysandu	(São Paulo (state)) Guarani
13	1992	(Paraná (state)) Paraná	(Bahia) Vitória
–	1993	Not held	
14	1994	(Rio Grande do Sul) Juventude	Goiás
15	1995	(Paraná (state)) Atlético Paranaense	(Paraná (state)) Coritiba
16	1996	(São Paulo (state)) União São João	(Rio Grande do Norte) América de Natal
17	1997	(Minas Gerais) América Mineiro	(São Paulo (state)) Ponte Preta
18	1998	(Federal District (Brazil)) Gama	(São Paulo (state)) Botafogo
19	1999	Goiás	(Pernambuco) Santa Cruz
–	2000	Not held (See Copa João Havelange Group Yellow)	
20	2001	(Pará) Paysandu	(Santa Catarina (state)) Figueirense
21	2002	(Santa Catarina (state)) Criciúma	(Ceará) Fortaleza
22	2003	(São Paulo (state)) Palmeiras	(Rio de Janeiro (state)) Botafogo
23	2004	(Federal District (Brazil)) Brasiliense	(Ceará) Fortaleza
24	2005	(Rio Grande do Sul) Grêmio	(Pernambuco) Santa Cruz

Round-robin tournament

Since 2006, the competition has had a consistent format with 20 teams and 38 matchdays, with each team playing the others twice, once at home and once away. Here is the list of teams promoted to the Série A each season. Starting in 2026, the promotion spots for the third and fourth-placed teams began to be decided via a promotion play-off between the teams that finished third through sixth in the overall standings.

Ed.	Season	Champion	Runner-up	Third place	Fourth place
25	2006	(Minas Gerais) Atlético Mineiro	(Pernambuco) Sport	(Pernambuco) Náutico	(Rio Grande do Norte) América
26	2007	(Paraná (state)) Coritiba	(Minas Gerais) Ipatinga	(São Paulo (state)) Portuguesa	(Bahia) Vitória
27	2008	(São Paulo (state)) Corinthians	(São Paulo (state)) Santo André	(Santa Catarina (state)) Avaí	(São Paulo (state)) Barueri
28	2009	(Rio de Janeiro (state)) Vasco da Gama	(São Paulo (state)) Guarani	Ceará	(Goiás) Atlético Goianiense
29	2010	(Paraná (state)) Coritiba	(Santa Catarina (state)) Figueirense	Bahia	(Minas Gerais) América Mineiro
30	2011	(São Paulo (state)) Portuguesa	(Pernambuco) Náutico	(São Paulo (state)) Ponte Preta	(Pernambuco) Sport
31	2012	Goiás	(Santa Catarina (state)) Criciúma	(Paraná (state)) Atlético Paranaense	(Bahia) Vitória
32	2013	(São Paulo (state)) Palmeiras	(Santa Catarina (state)) Chapecoense	(Pernambuco) Sport	(Santa Catarina (state)) Figueirense
33	2014	(Santa Catarina (state)) Joinville	(São Paulo (state)) Ponte Preta	(Rio de Janeiro (state)) Vasco da Gama	(Santa Catarina (state)) Avaí
34	2015	(Rio de Janeiro (state)) Botafogo	(Pernambuco) Santa Cruz	(Bahia) Vitória	(Minas Gerais) América Mineiro
35	2016	(Goiás) Atlético Goianiense	(Santa Catarina (state)) Avaí	(Rio de Janeiro (state)) Vasco da Gama	Bahia
36	2017	(Minas Gerais) América Mineiro	(Rio Grande do Sul) Internacional	Ceará	(Paraná (state)) Paraná
37	2018	(Ceará) Fortaleza	(Alagoas) CSA	(Santa Catarina (state)) Avaí	Goiás
38	2019	(São Paulo (state)) Bragantino	(Pernambuco) Sport	(Paraná (state)) Coritiba	(Goiás) Atlético Goianiense
39	2020	(Santa Catarina (state)) Chapecoense	(Minas Gerais) América Mineiro	(Rio Grande do Sul) Juventude	(Mato Grosso) Cuiabá
40	2021	(Rio de Janeiro (state)) Botafogo	Goiás	(Paraná (state)) Coritiba	(Santa Catarina (state)) Avaí
41	2022	(Minas Gerais) Cruzeiro	(Rio Grande do Sul) Grêmio	(Rio de Janeiro (state)) Vasco da Gama	Bahia
42	2023	(Bahia) Vitória	(Rio Grande do Sul) Juventude	(Santa Catarina (state)) Criciúma	(Goiás) Atlético Goianiense
43	2024	(São Paulo (state)) Santos	(São Paulo (state)) Mirassol	(Pernambuco) Sport	Ceará
44	2025	(Paraná (state)) Coritiba	(Paraná (state)) Athletico Paranaense	(Santa Catarina (state)) Chapecoense	(Pará) Remo
45	2026	(São Paulo (state)) Novorizontino	(Rio Grande do Sul) Juventude		

Notes

- In 1986, Treze, Central, Inter de Limeira and Criciúma were the champions of their respective groups and were promoted to the first level in the same year. Confederação Brasileira de Futebol is yet to recognize these titles.
- In 1987, Americano and Operário–MS each won their groups (White and Blue respectively) as well.
- In 2000, Paraná defeated São Caetano in the Final of the Yellow Module of the Copa João Havelange and both, plus Remo, who finished third were promoted to Knockout Stage of the Série A in the same year. However, only São Caetano and Paraná remained in the Série A in 2001 season. São Caetano later became the runner-up of the first division in the same year that became the runner-up of the second division. Confederação Brasileira de Futebol is yet to recognize this title.

=== Unofficial champions ===
The following seasons are not officially recognized by the CBF:

Year	Winner	Score	Runner-up	Third place	Comments
1979	Maranhão	Overall group standings	(Paraná (state)) Grêmio Maringá	(Minas Gerais) Uberaba	The first phase of the Copa Brasil that year was divided into groups, and Maranhão was the best-ranked team.
1986	(Paraíba) Treze	Group E	Maranhão	(Amazonas (Brazilian state)) Rio Negro	The four winners were promoted to the first level in the same year.
1986	(Pernambuco) Central	Group F	(Rio de Janeiro (state)) Americano	(Rio de Janeiro (state)) Goytacaz	The four winners were promoted to the first level in the same year.
1986	(São Paulo (state)) Inter de Limeira	Group G	(São Paulo (state)) Juventus	(São Paulo (state)) Santo André	The four winners were promoted to the first level in the same year.
1986	(Santa Catarina (state)) Criciúma	Group H	(Santa Catarina (state)) Marcílio Dias	(Paraná (state)) Pinheiros	The four winners were promoted to the first level in the same year.
1987	(Rio de Janeiro (state)) Americano	Blue Module	(Minas Gerais) Uberlândia	(Rio Grande do Sul) Juventude	Final stage of each module was disputed in a triangular.
1987	(Mato Grosso do Sul) Operário–MS	White Module	(Pará) Paysandu	(Paraíba) Botafogo-PB	Final stage of each module was disputed in a triangular.
2000	(Paraná (state)) Paraná	1 − 1; 3 − 1	(São Paulo (state)) São Caetano	(Pará) Remo	It was the Yellow Module of the Copa João Havelange. The top three teams were promoted to the first level in the same year.

== Titles by team ==
Below are the titles by team, according to the Brazilian Football Confederation:

Rank	Club	Winners	Winning years
1	(Paraná (state)) Coritiba	3	2007, 2010, 2025
2	(Minas Gerais) América Mineiro	2	1997, 2017
2	(Rio de Janeiro (state)) Botafogo	2	2015, 2021
2	Goiás	2	1999, 2012
2	(São Paulo (state)) Palmeiras	2	2003, 2013
2	(São Paulo (state)) Bragantino	2	1989, 2019
2	(Paraná (state)) Paraná	2	1992, 2000
2	(Pará) Paysandu	2	1991, 2001
3	(Goiás) Atlético Goianiense	1	2016
3	(Minas Gerais) Atlético Mineiro	1	2006
3	(Paraná (state)) Athletico Paranaense	1	1995
3	(Federal District (Brazil)) Brasiliense	1	2004
3	(Rio de Janeiro (state)) Campo Grande	1	1982
3	(Santa Catarina (state)) Chapecoense	1	2020
3	(São Paulo (state)) Corinthians	1	2008
3	(Santa Catarina (state)) Criciúma	1	2002
3	(Minas Gerais) Cruzeiro	1	2022
3	(Ceará) Fortaleza	1	2018
3	(Federal District (Brazil)) Gama	1	1998
3	(Rio Grande do Sul) Grêmio	1	2005
3	(São Paulo (state)) Guarani	1	1981
3	(São Paulo (state)) Inter de Limeira	1	1988
3	(Santa Catarina (state)) Joinville	1	2014
3	(Rio Grande do Sul) Juventude	1	1994
3	(São Paulo (state)) Juventus	1	1983
3	(Paraná (state)) Londrina	1	1980
3	(São Paulo (state)) Novorizontino	1	2026
3	(São Paulo (state)) Portuguesa	1	2011
3	(Maranhão) Sampaio Corrêa	1	1972
3	(São Paulo (state)) Santos	1	2024
3	(Pernambuco) Sport Recife	1	1990
3	(Pará) Tuna Luso	1	1985
3	(Minas Gerais) Uberlândia	1	1984
3	(São Paulo (state)) União São João	1	1996
3	(Rio de Janeiro (state)) Vasco da Gama	1	2009
3	(Minas Gerais) Villa Nova	1	1971
3	(Bahia) Vitória	1	2023

== Titles by state ==
Below are the titles by state, according to the Brazilian Football Confederation:

State	Nº of titles
São Paulo	12
Paraná	7
Minas Gerais	6
Rio de Janeiro	4
Pará	3
Goiás	3
Santa Catarina	3
Distrito Federal	2
Rio Grande do Sul	2
Bahia	1
Ceará	1
Maranhão	1
Pernambuco	1

== Participations ==
=== Most appearances ===
As of 2026 season

Below is the list of clubs that have more appearances in the Campeonato Brasileiro Série B.

Club	App	First	Last
CRB	36	1971	2026
Ceará	33	1981	2026
América Mineiro	29	1980	2026
Criciúma	28	1980	2026
Londrina	28	1971	2026
Vila Nova	28	1982	2026
Avaí	27	1980	2026
América de Natal	24	1972	2014
Náutico	24	1971	2026
Ponte Preta	24	1971	2026
Remo	23	1971	2025
ABC	22	1971	2023
Americano	20	1980	2002
Botafogo (SP)	20	1980	2026
Joinville	20	1982	2016
Paysandu	20	1971	2025
Sampaio Corrêa	20	1971	2023
Santa Cruz	20	1982	2017

=== Clubs promoted to Série A ===
1971 and 1972

Year	Clubs
1971	None
1972	None

Taça de Prata era (1980-1986)

Year	Clubs promoted in same year	Clubs promoted to next season
1980	América de Rio Preto, Americano, Bangu, Sport	Londrina, CSA
1981	Bahia, Náutico, Palmeiras, Uberaba	Guarani, Anapolina
1982	America (RJ), Atlético Paranaense, Corinthians, São Paulo (RS)	Campo Grande, CSA
1983	Americano, Botafogo (SP), Guarani, Operário (MS)	None
1984	Uberlândia	Remo
1985	None	Tuna Luso
1986	Central, Criciúma, Inter de Limeira, Treze	—N/a

Mixed formats (1987-2005)

Year	Clubs
1987	See Copa União
1988	Inter de Limeira, Náutico
1989	Bragantino, São José (SP)
1990	Sport, Atlético Paranaense
1991	Paysandu, Guarani
1992	Paraná, Vitória, Criciúma, Santa Cruz, Remo, América Mineiro, Fortaleza, União São João, Grêmio, Ceará, Desportiva, Coritiba
1994	Juventude, Goiás
1995	Atlético Paranaense, Coritiba
1996	União São João, América de Natal
1997	América Mineiro, Ponte Preta
1998	Gama, Botafogo (SP)
1999–2000	See Copa João Havelange
2001	Paysandu, Figueirense
2002	Criciúma, Fortaleza
2003	Palmeiras, Botafogo
2004	Brasiliense, Fortaleza
2005	Grêmio, Santa Cruz

Round-robin tournament (2006-present)

Year	Clubs (points)
2006	Atlético Mineiro (71), Sport (64), Náutico (64), América de Natal (61)
2007	Coritiba (69), Ipatinga (67), Portuguesa (63), Vitória (59)
2008	Corinthians (85), Santo André (68), Avaí (67), Grêmio Barueri (63)
2009	Vasco da Gama (76), Guarani (69), Ceará (68), Atlético Goianiense (65)
2010	Coritiba (71), Figueirense (67), Bahia (65), América Mineiro (63)
2011	Portuguesa (81), Náutico (64), Ponte Preta (63), Sport (61)
2012	Goiás (78), Criciúma (73), Atlético Paranaense (71), Vitória (71)
2013	Palmeiras (82), Chapecoense (72), Sport (63), Figueirense (60)
2014	Joinville (70), Ponte Preta (69), Vasco da Gama (63), Avaí (62)
2015	Botafogo (72), Santa Cruz (67), Vitória (66), América Mineiro (65)
2016	Atlético Goianiense (76), Avaí (66), Vasco da Gama (65), Bahia (63)
2017	América Mineiro (73), Internacional (71), Ceará (67), Paraná (64)
2018	Fortaleza (71), CSA (62), Avaí (61), Goiás (60)
2019	Bragantino (75), Sport (68), Coritiba (66), Atlético Goianiense (62)
2020	Chapecoense (73), América Mineiro (73), Juventude (61), Cuiabá (61)
2021	Botafogo (70), Goiás (65), Coritiba (64), Avaí (64)
2022	Cruzeiro (78), Grêmio (65), Bahia (62), Vasco da Gama (62)
2023	Vitória (72), Juventude (65), Criciúma (64), Atlético Goianiense (64)
2024	Santos (68), Mirassol (67), Sport (66), Ceará (64)
2025	Coritiba (68), Athletico Paranaense (65), Chapecoense (62), Remo (62)
2026	Novorizontino (73), Juventude (71)

=== Clubs relegated to Série C ===
Mixed formats (1988-2005)

Year	Clubs (points)
1988	None
1990	None
1992	None
1994	Fortaleza (6), Tiradentes (DF) (5)
1995	~~Ponte Preta (5)~~, Democrata (GV) (5)
1996	Canceled
1997	Moto Club (Group A), Central (Group B), Sergipe (Group C), Goiatuba (Group D), Mogi Mirim (Group E)
1998	Fluminense (11), Atlético Goianiense (10), Náutico (8), Juventus (7), Volta Redonda (6), Americano (6)
1999–2000	See Copa João Havelange
2001	Sergipe (33), Tuna Luso (33), ABC (29), Desportiva (29), Nacional (AM) (25), Serra (24)
2002	Americano (32), Botafogo (SP) (30), Sampaio Corrêa (25), Guarany de Sobral (20), XV de Piracicaba (19), Bragantino (17)
2003	Gama (19), União São João (16)
2004	América de Natal (26), Remo (25), América Mineiro (23), Joinville (18), Mogi Mirim (18), Londrina (17)
2005	Vitória (27), Bahia (25), Anapolina (25), União Barbarense (24), Criciúma (19), Caxias (16)

Round-robin tournament (2006-present)

Year	Clubs (points)
2006	Paysandu (44), Guarani (44), São Raimundo (AM) (43), Vila Nova (42)
2007	Paulista (46), Santa Cruz (42), Remo (36), Ituano (33)
2008	Marília (45), Criciúma (41), Gama (35), CRB (24)
2009	Juventude (44), Fortaleza (38), Campinense (37), ABC (35)
2010	Brasiliense (46), Santo André (43), Ipatinga (41), América de Natal (41)
2011	Icasa (47), Vila Nova (32), Salgueiro (26), Duque de Caxias (17)
2012	CRB (42), Guarani (41), Ipatinga (41), Grêmio Barueri (30)
2013	Guaratinguetá (41), Paysandu (40), São Caetano (36), ASA (35)
2014	América de Natal (43), Icasa (43), Vila Nova (32), Portuguesa (25)
2015	Macaé (43), ABC (32), Boa Esporte (31), Mogi Mirim (23)
2016	Joinville (40), Tupi (33), Bragantino (32), Sampaio Corrêa (27)
2017	Luverdense (44), Santa Cruz (37), ABC (34), Náutico (32)
2018	Paysandu (43), Sampaio Corrêa (38), Juventude (35), Boa Esporte (30)
2019	Londrina (39), São Bento (39), Criciúma (39), Vila Nova (39)
2020	Figueirense (39), Paraná (37), Botafogo (SP) (34), Oeste (29)
2021	Remo (43), Vitória (40), Confiança (37), Brasil de Pelotas (23)
2022	CSA (42), Brusque (34), Operário Ferroviário (34), Náutico (30)
2023	Sampaio Corrêa (39), Tombense (37), Londrina (31), ABC (28)
2024	Ponte Preta (38), Ituano (37), Brusque (36), Guarani (33)
2025	Ferroviária (40), Amazonas (36), Volta Redonda (36), Paysandu (28)
2026	Avaí (43), Londrina (35), América Mineiro (29), Ponte Preta (15)

1. No relegations due to absence of a Série C tournament in the posterior season.
2. Ponte Preta is spared from relegation after América de Rio Preto, Bangu, Barra do Garças, Ferroviária and Novorizontino withdrew.
3. Sports court (STJD) canceled all relegations in 1996 season, sparing Goiatuba, Sergipe and Central.

== Top scorers ==
Year	Player (team)	Goals
1971	Robilotta (Remo)	4
1972	Pelezinho (Sampaio Corrêa)	8
1980	Osmarzinho (Botafogo-SP)	12
1981	Jorge Mendonça (Guarani)	11
1982	Luizinho (Campo Grande)	10
1983	Lima (Operário-MS)	9
1984	Dadinho (Remo)	6
1985	Paulo César (Tuna Luso); Guilherme (Figueirense)	6
1986	Joãozinho (Taguatinga)	11
1987	Manelão (Paysandu)	6
1988	Machado (Inter de Limeira)	11
1989	Bugrão (Anapolina)	7
1990	Rivelino (Catuense)	11
1991	Cacaio (Paysandu)	14
1992	Saulo (Paraná)	12
1994	Baltazar (Goiás); Mário (Juventude)	11
1995	Oséas (Atlético Paranaense)	14
1996	Maurício (Santa Cruz)	13
1997	Tupãzinho (América-MG)	13
1998	Gauchinho (XV de Piracicaba)	13
1999	Ueslei (Bahia)	25
2000	Adhemar (São Caetano)	16
2001	Sérgio Alves (Ceará)	21
2002	Vinícius (Fortaleza)	22
2003	Vágner Love (Palmeiras)	19
2004	Rinaldo (Fortaleza)	14
2005	Reinaldo (Santa Cruz)	16
2006	Vanderlei (Gama)	21
2007	Alessandro (Ipatinga)	25
2008	Túlio Maravilha (Vila Nova)	24
2009	Elton (Vasco da Gama); Marcelo Nicácio (Fortaleza); Rafael Coelho (Figueirense)	17
2010	Alessandro (Ipatinga)	21
2011	Kieza (Náutico)	21
2012	Zé Carlos (Criciúma)	27
2013	Bruno Rangel (Chapecoense)	31
2014	Magno Alves (Ceará)	18
2015	Zé Carlos (CRB)	19
2016	Bill (Ceará)	15
2017	Bergson (Paysandu); Mazinho (Oeste)	16
2018	Dagoberto (Londrina)	17
2019	Guilherme (Sport)	17
2020	Caio Dantas (Sampaio Corrêa)	17
2021	Edu (Brusque)	17
2022	Gabriel Poveda (Sampaio Corrêa)	19
2023	Gustavo Coutinho (Atlético Goianiense)	14
2024	Erick Pulga (Ceará)	13
2025	Pedro Rocha (Remo)	15

1. Torneio Paralelo.
2. White and Blue Modules of the Copa União.
3. Yellow Module of the Copa João Havelange. Adhemar scored another six goals in the Knockout Stage of the Copa João Havelange.

== Winning managers ==
Year	Manager	Club
1971	Martim Francisco	Villa Nova
1972	Marçal Tolentino	Sampaio Corrêa
1980	Jair Bala	Londrina
1981	José Duarte	Guarani
1982	Décio Esteves	Campo Grande
1983	Candinho	Juventus
1984	Vicente Lage	Uberlândia
1985	José Dutra	Tuna Luso
1987	José Maria Pena	Americano
1987	Silvio Elite	Operário-MS
1988	Levir Culpi	Inter de Limeira
1989	Vanderlei Luxemburgo	Bragantino
1990	Roberto Brida	Sport Recife
1991	Joel Martins	Paysandu
1992	Otacílio Gonçalves	Paraná
1994	Heron Ferreira	Juventude
1995	Pepe	Atlético Paranaense
1996	Lula Pereira	União São João
1997	Givanildo Oliveira	América Mineiro
1998	Vágner Benazzi	Gama
1999	Hélio dos Anjos	Goiás
2000	Geninho	Paraná
2001	Givanildo Oliveira (2)	Paysandu
2002	Edson Gaúcho	Criciúma
2003	Jair Picerni	Palmeiras
2004	Edinho	Brasiliense
2005	Mano Menezes	Grêmio
2006	Levir Culpi (2)	Atlético Mineiro
2007	René Simões	Coritiba
2008	Mano Menezes (2)	Corinthians
2009	Dorival Júnior	Vasco da Gama
2010	Ney Franco	Coritiba
2011	Jorginho	Portuguesa
2012	Enderson Moreira	Goiás
2013	Gilson Kleina	Palmeiras
2014	Hemerson Maria	Joinville
2015	Ricardo Gomes	Botafogo
2016	Marcelo Cabo	Atlético Goianiense
2017	Enderson Moreira (2)	América Mineiro
2018	Rogério Ceni	Fortaleza
2019	Antônio Carlos Zago	Bragantino
2020	Umberto Louzer	Chapecoense
2021	Enderson Moreira (3)	Botafogo
2022	(Uruguay) Paulo Pezzolano	Cruzeiro
2023	Léo Condé	Vitória
2024	Fábio Carille	Santos
2025	Mozart	Coritiba
2026	Enderson Moreira (4)	Novorizontino

1. White and Blue Modules of the Copa União.
2. Yellow Module of the Copa João Havelange.

== See also ==
- Copa do Brasil, the main knockout football competition of Brazilian football
- Campeonato Brasileiro Série A, the main division of Brazilian football
- Campeonato Brasileiro Série C, the third division of Brazilian football
- Campeonato Brasileiro Série D, the fourth division of Brazilian football
