= Estádio Severiano Gomes Filho =

Brazilian association football venue

- Estádio Pajuçara
- Address: Maceió; Brazil
- Coordinates: 9.6639°S 35.7185°W
- Owner: Clube de Regatas Brasil
- Type: Multi-use
- Capacity: 6,000
- Record attendance: 8,000

Construction
- Built: 1921

Estádio Severiano Gomes Filho, also known as Estádio Pajuçara, was a multi-use stadium in Pajuçara neighborhood, Maceió, Brazil. It was used mostly for football matches. The stadium had a capacity of 6,000 people.

Estádio Severiano Gomes Filho was owned by CRB The stadium is named after Severiano Gomes Filho, who was the president of CRB in the 1910s and in the 1920s.

== History ==
In 1921, the construction of Estádio Severiano Gomes Filho was completed. The inaugural match was played on September 9 of that year, between CRB and Perez of Pernambuco.

The stadium's attendance record currently stands at 8,000, set on July 25, 1965 when Santos beat CRB 6–0.
