= Estádio Ismael Benigno =

Multi-use stadium in Manaus, Brazil

Coordinates: 3°7′19″S 60°2′16″W

- Estádio da Colina
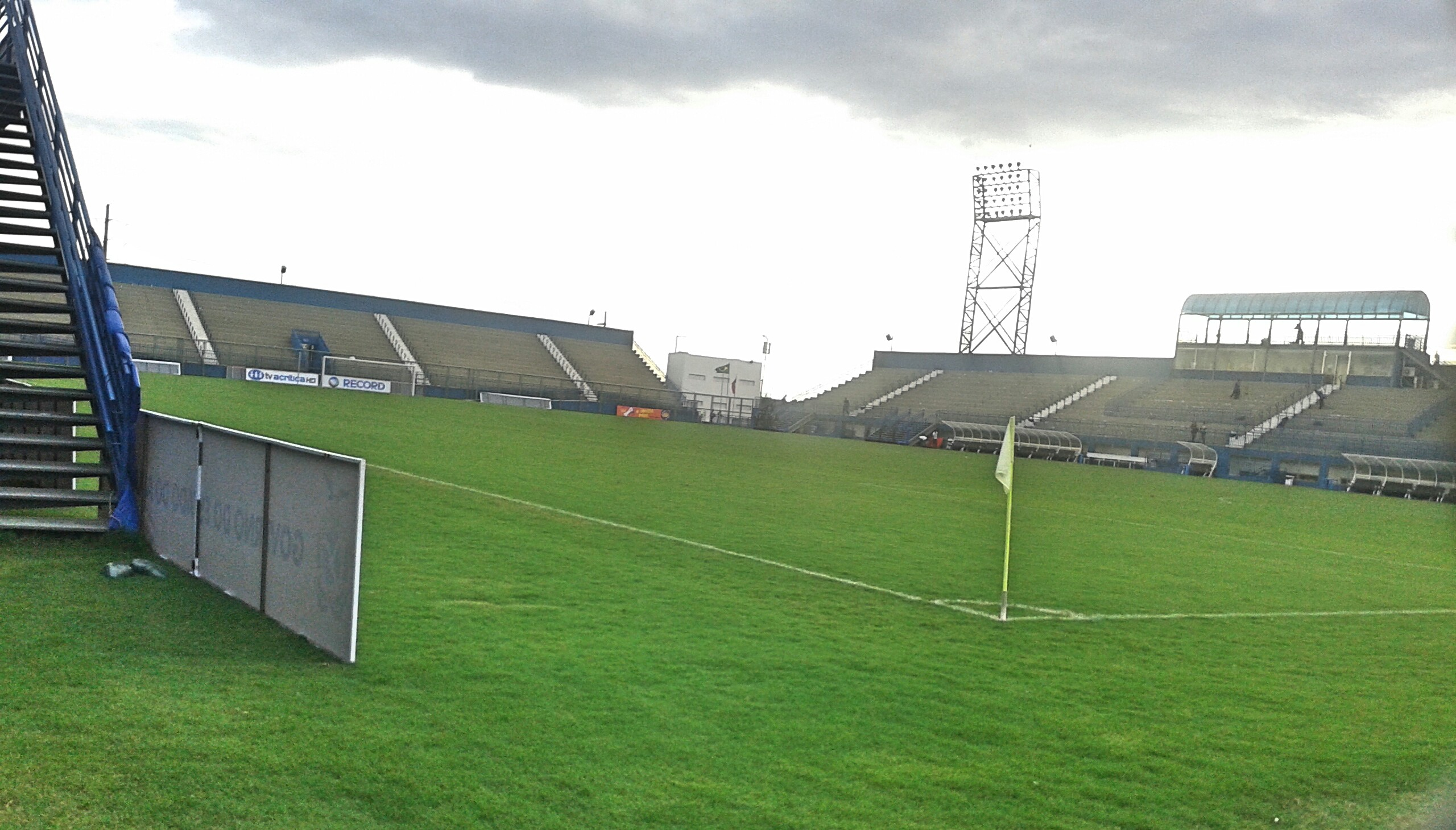
- Interactive map of Estádio Ismael Benigno
- Location: Manaus, Brazil
- Owner: São Raimundo Esporte Clube
- Capacity: 10,400
- Surface: Grass

Construction
- Opened: February 19, 1961

Tenants
- Manaus Futebol Clube; São Raimundo Esporte Clube

Estádio Ismael Benigno, also known as Estádio da Colina, is a multi-use stadium in Manaus, Brazil. It is currently used mostly for football matches. The stadium has a capacity of 10,400 people.

The Estádio Ismael Benigno is owned by, and is the home stadium of, São Raimundo Esporte Clube. The stadium is named after Ismael Benigno, who was a president of the São Raimundo club in the 1950s and 1960s, and is the one who bought the groundplot on which the stadium was built.

== History ==
In 1961, the works on Estádio Ismael Benigno were completed. The inaugural match was played on February 19 of that year, when Sport Recife beat São Raimundo 8–1. The first ever goal at the stadium was scored by Sport Recife's Mário.

On February 18, 1967, Nacional beat São Raimundo 3–1, during the inauguration of the stadium lights.

The stadium's attendance record currently stands at 16,000, set on August 4, 2000 when the stadium was reinaugurated and São Raimundo beat the Suriname national football team 5–0.
