= Copa João Havelange Group Yellow =

Copa João Havelange Group Yellow was one of the three groups of 2000 season's first stage of the Brazilian football league, named Copa João Havelange. It consists of 36 teams divided by 2 groups. 3 teams qualified for the final stage of Copa João Havelange.

Although division of groups is by the popularity of the clubs, Group Yellow contain 17 of 22 Série B clubs in 1999 season, which 4 of the excluded clubs were played in Group Blue. The only exception is Tuna Luso Brasileira. The group also contain top 8 of the past Série C season, except Fluminense (in group Blue) and Club Sportivo Sergipe.

Group A consist of teams from Minas Gerais, Paraná, Rio de Janeiro, Rio Grande do Sul, Santa Catarina and São Paulo.

Group B consist of teams from Amazonas, Alagoas, Ceará, Espírito Santo, Federal District, Goiás, Maranhão, Pará, Pernambuco, Piauí and Rio Grande do Norte.

== Teams ==
=== Group A ===
Club	City	Stadium	1999 seasons	2000 seasons
América (RJ)	Rio de Janeiro			(Rio de Janeiro (state)) Taça Rio 9th place
Americano	Campos dos Goytacazes		Série C Quarterfinallists	(Rio de Janeiro (state)) Taça Rio 6th place
Avaí	Florianópolis		Série B Quarterfinalists	(Santa Catarina (state)) Campeonato Catarinense
Bangu	Rio de Janeiro		Série C First Round	(Rio de Janeiro (state)) Taça Rio 5th place^{1}
Botafogo (SP)	Ribeirão Preto		Série A 20th place	(São Paulo (state)) Campeonato Paulista Série A2
Bragantino	Bragança Paulista		Série B 12th place	(São Paulo (state)) Campeonato Paulista Série A2
Brasil	Pelotas		Série C Round of 16	(Rio Grande do Sul) Campeonato Gaúcho Série B
Caxias	Caxias do Sul		Série C Quarterfinallists	(Rio Grande do Sul) Campeonato Gaúcho Champions
Criciúma	Criciúma		Série B 18th place	(Santa Catarina (state)) Campeonato Catarinense 6th place
Figueirense	Florianópolis		Série C Quarterfinallists	(Santa Catarina (state)) Campeonato Catarinense Semifinalists
Joinville	Joinville		Série B 15th place	(Santa Catarina (state)) Campeonato Catarinense Champions
Londrina	Londrina		Série B 10th place	(Paraná (state)) Campeonato Paranaense Quarterfinalists
Marcílio Dias	Itajaí			(Santa Catarina (state)) Campeonato Catarinense Runner-up^{1}
Paraná	Curitiba		Série A 17th place	(Paraná (state)) Campeonato Paranaense Semifinalists
São Caetano	São Caetano do Sul		Série B Quarterfinalists	(São Paulo (state)) Campeonato Paulista Série A2
União São João	Araras		Série B 17th place	(São Paulo (state)) Campeonato Paulista Round of 16
Villa Nova (MG)	Nova Lima		Série C Round of 16	(Minas Gerais) Campeonato Mineiro 5th place
XV de Novembro	Piracicaba		Série B 9th place	(São Paulo (state)) Campeonato Paulista Série A2

=== Group B ===
Club	City	Stadium	1999 seasons	2000 seasons
ABC	Natal		Série B 14th place	(Rio Grande do Norte) Campeonato Potiguar Champions
América (RN)	Natal		Série B 21st place	(Rio Grande do Norte) Campeonato Potiguar 4th place
Anapolina	Anápolis		Série C First Round	(Goiás) Campeonato Goiano Runner-up^{1}
Bandeirante	Núcleo Bandeirante			(Federal District (Brazil)) Campeonato Brasiliense Runner-up^{1}
Ceará	Fortaleza		Série B Quarterfinallists	(Ceará) Campeonato Cearense Semifinallists
CRB	Maceió		Série B 11th place	(Alagoas) Campeonato Alagoano
CSA	Maceió		Série C First Round	(Alagoas) Campeonato Alagoano Runner-up
Desportiva	Cariacica		Série B 22nd place	(Espírito Santo) Campeonato Capixaba Champions
Fortaleza	Fortaleza		Série C First Round	(Ceará) Campeonato Cearense Champions
Nacional (AM)	Manaus			(Amazonas (Brazilian state)) Campeonato Amazonense Champions
Náutico	Recife		Série C 4th place	(Pernambuco) Campeonato Pernambucano 5th place
Paysandu	Belém		Série B 19th place	(Pará) Campeonato Paraense Champions
Remo	Belém		Série B 13th place	(Pará) Campeonato Paraense
River	Teresina			(Piauí) Campeonato Piauiense Champions
Sampaio Corrêa	São Luís		Série B 16th place	(Maranhão) Campeonato Maranhense 3rd place
Serra	Serra		Série C 3rd place	(Espírito Santo) Campeonato Capixaba Runner-up
São Raimundo	Manaus		Série C Runner-up	(Amazonas (Brazilian state)) Campeonato Amazonense Runner-up
Vila Nova (GO)	Goiânia		Série B 4th place	(Goiás) Campeonato Goiano 14th place

^{1} Best Place

== First round ==
=== Group A ===
Pos	Team	Pld	W	D	L	GF	GA	GD	Pts	Qualification
1	São Caetano (SP)	17	11	4	2	40	19	+21	37	Second Round
2	Figueirense (SC)	17	8	7	2	25	13	+12	31	Second Round
3	Paraná (PR)	17	8	5	4	18	11	+7	29	Second Round
4	Botafogo (SP)	17	8	4	5	27	15	+12	28	Second Round
5	Criciúma (SC)	17	7	5	5	19	18	+1	26	Second Round
6	Caxias (RS)	17	6	8	3	29	26	+3	26	Second Round
7	Bangu (RJ)	17	6	6	5	25	23	+2	24	Second Round
8	Avaí (SC)	17	5	9	3	27	21	+6	24	Second Round
9	Joinville (SC)	17	5	7	5	19	17	+2	22	
10	América (RJ)	17	5	6	6	18	20	−2	21	
11	Americano (RJ)	17	4	8	5	17	22	−5	20	
12	União São João (SP)	17	3	11	3	20	21	−1	20	
13	XV de Novembro/P (SP)	17	5	4	8	21	27	−6	19	
14	Marcílio Dias (SC)	17	4	7	6	17	23	−6	19	
15	Bragantino (SP)	17	2	11	4	16	21	−5	17	
16	Brasil (RS)	17	4	3	10	17	25	−8	15	
17	Villa Nova (MG)	17	3	6	8	18	27	−9	15	
18	Londrina (PR)	17	2	3	12	8	32	−24	9	

=== Group B ===
Pos	Team	Pld	W	D	L	GF	GA	GD	Pts	Qualification
1	Fortaleza	17	10	5	2	38	25	+13	35	Second Round
2	São Raimundo (AM)	17	9	3	5	32	24	+8	30	Second Round
3	Sampaio Corrêa	17	9	3	5	23	24	−1	30	Second Round
4	Náutico	17	8	4	5	22	16	+6	28	Second Round
5	Paysandu	17	8	4	5	22	17	+5	28	Second Round
6	Anapolina	17	7	7	3	24	14	+10	28	Second Round
7	Remo	17	7	5	5	23	21	+2	26	Second Round
8	CRB	17	6	8	3	25	19	+6	26	Second Round
9	Serra	17	7	4	6	26	22	+4	25	
10	ABC	17	6	5	6	26	24	+2	23	
11	River	17	6	4	7	23	23	0	22	
12	América de Natal	17	5	6	6	24	23	+1	21	
13	Ceará	17	5	6	6	20	19	+1	21	
14	CSA	17	6	2	9	22	29	−7	20	
15	Nacional (AM)	17	5	4	8	34	37	−3	19	
16	Desportiva Capixaba	17	5	1	11	19	42	−23	16	
17	Vila Nova (GO)	17	2	5	10	20	25	−5	11	
18	Bandeirante	17	1	6	10	16	35	−19	9	

== Knockout stage ==
=== Bracket ===
Round of Sixteen
A1	São Caetano (SP)	1	4	5
B8	CRB (AL)	1	1	2
B4	Náutico (PE)	2	0	2
A5	Criciúma (SC)	1	0	1
A4	Botafogo (SP)	0	2	2
B5	Paysandu (PA)	3	1	4
B1	Fortaleza (CE)	2	1	3
A8	Avaí (SC)	0	2	2
A2	Figueirense (SC)	1	2	3
B7	Remo (PA)	4	1	5
B3	Sampaio Corrêa (MA)	0	1	1
A6	Caxias (RS)	2	1	3
B2	São Raimundo (AM)	1	2	3
A7	Bangu (RJ)	2	2	4
A3	Paraná (PR)	1	2	3
B6	Anapolina (GO)	0	0	0

Quarterfinals
A1	São Caetano (SP)	0	6	6
B4	Náutico (PE)	1	2	3
B5	Paysandu (PA)	1	1	2
B1	Fortaleza (CE)	0	0	0
B7	Remo (PA)	1	3	4
A6	Caxias (RS)	2	0	2
A7	Bangu (RJ)	0	1	1
A3	Paraná (PR)	3	2	5

Semifinals
A1	São Caetano (SP)	1	5	6
B5	Paysandu (PA)	1	4	5
B7	Remo (PA)	0	1	1
A3	Paraná (PR)	0	2	2

Final
A1	São Caetano (SP)	1	1	2
A3	Paraná (PR)	1	3	4

=== Third-place match ===
Team 1	Agg.	Team 2	1st leg	2nd leg
Remo (PA)	4–3	Paysandu (PA)	3–2	1–1
