= Machadão =

Stadium in Natal, Brazil

Coordinates: 5.82562°S 35.2138°W

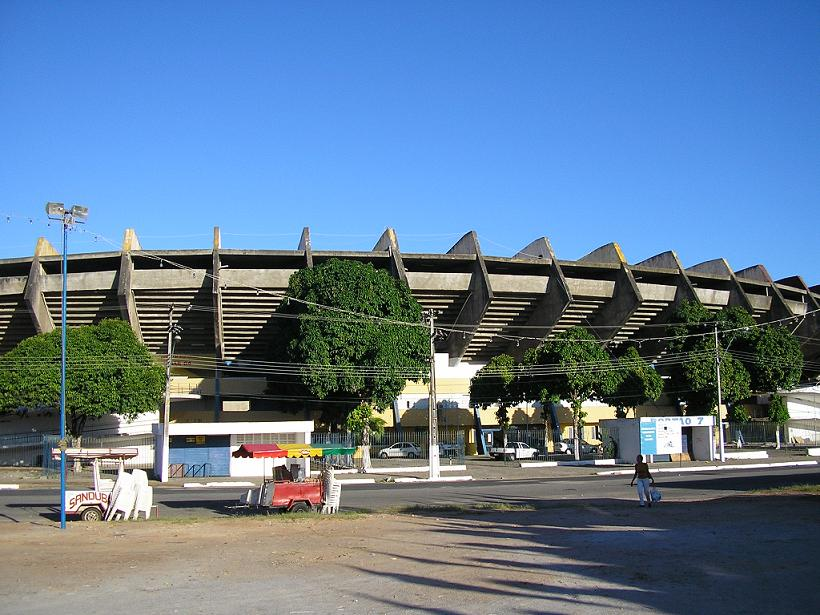
- Interactive map of Machadão
- Full name: Estádio Dr. João Cláudio Vasconcelos Machado
- Location: Natal, Rio Grande do Norte, Brazil
- Capacity: 45,000
- Surface: Grass

Construction
- Opened: 1972
- Renovated: 2007
- Closed: April 24, 2011
- Demolished: 2011

Tenant
- Natal City Hall

Estádio Dr. João Cláudio Vasconcelos Machado, usually known as Machadão, was a multi-purpose stadium in the Brazilian city of Natal, Rio Grande do Norte. It was mostly used for football matches.

Estádio Machadão was owned by the Natal City Hall. The stadium was named after João Cláudio Vasconcelos Machado, who was the president of the Rio Grande do Norte Football Federation and a sports broadcaster.

Estádio Machadão (along with the Ginasio do Machadindo) was demolished at the end of 2011 to make room for the construction of the Arena das Dunas for the 2014 FIFA World Cup.

== Capacity ==
The stadium had an initial maximum capacity of 55,000 people. This was reduced to 51,000 for security reasons, then to 42,000, when renovated in 2007.

== History ==
In 1972, the works on Machadão were completed. The inaugural match was played on July 4 of that year, when ABC beat América de Natal 1–0. The first goal of the stadium was scored by ABC's Willian.

The stadium's attendance record was 53,320, set on November 29, 1972 when Santos beat ABC 2–0.

The stadium was renovated in 2007. The reinaugural match was played on May 13, 2007. Vasco beat América de Natal 1–0; the first goal was scored by André Dias.

Upon the selection of Natal to be a host city of the 2014 FIFA World Cup, the government decided that the construction of a new stadium was necessary. In 2011, the Machadão was demolished. A new stadium called Arena das Dunas was constructed.
