= Fábio Oliveira =

Fábio Oliveira may refer to:

- Fábio Marcelo de Oliveira (born 1974), Brazilian footballer better known as Fabio
- Fábio Noronha de Oliveira (born 1975) Brazilian footballer better known as Fábio Noronha
- Fábio Pereira de Oliveira (born 1981), Brazilian footballer better known as Fábio Bala
- Fábio Oliveira (footballer, born 1981), Togolese footballer
