= Rádio Itatiaia =

Radio network in Minas Gerais, Brazil

- Country: Brazil
- Headquarters: Belo Horizonte, Minas Gerais

Programming
- Language(s): Portuguese

Ownership
- Owner: Rede Itasat
- Sister stations: CNN Brasil

History
- Launch date: January 20, 1952

Links
- Webcast: Listen live
- Website: www.itatiaia.com.br

Rádio Itatiaia is a Brazilian radio network headquartered in Belo Horizonte, Minas Gerais. In the Belo Horizonte metropolitan area, the main station broadcasts on 610 kHz and 95.7 MHz. The network has branches in Ipatinga, Juiz de Fora, Montes Claros, Ouro Preto, and Varginha, and several affiliates throughout the state of Minas Gerais. In 2022, the station became the most listened to in Brazil, according to Kantar Ibope Media.

== History ==
During his youth, Januário Carneiro founded Rádio Jupiter, a small-scale station situated in the rear courtyard of his residence, in the 1930s. Its broadcast range extended approximately five blocks within the Serra neighborhood of Belo Horizonte. His younger brother, Emanuel, would traverse the vicinity to notify neighbors of the station's broadcast commencement. The programming encompassed both musical selections from 78 rpm records and live vocal performances by his sister, Ester, who sang contemporary songs of the period.

Carneiro embarked on a career in journalism and was subsequently employed by Rádio Continental in Rio de Janeiro. It was during this tenure that he began formulating the ambition to establish his own broadcasting station, one that would depart from conventional programming models. In 1951, he procured a small radio station in Nova Lima, and in the subsequent year, he secured the requisite authorization to commence operations in Belo Horizonte.

Rádio Itatiaia became renowned for its sports broadcasts and news coverage, in contrast to its competitors, which focused more on radio dramas. It was the first commercial radio station in Brazil to transmit continuously and live over the internet.

On May 13, 2021, after nearly seven decades under the stewardship of the Carneiro family, Rádio Itatiaia and its affiliated stations were acquired by businessman Rubens Menin, proprietor of MRV, Inter, and Novus Mídia (the controlling shareholder of CNN Brasil).
