= Jornal da Cultura =

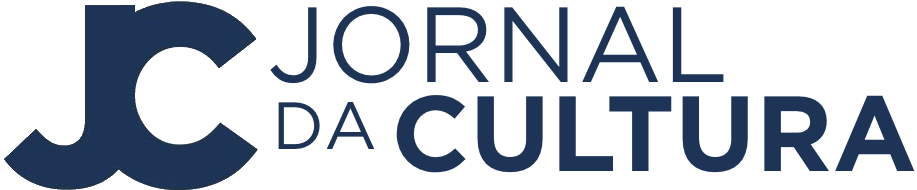
- Genre: News and Debate
- Theme music composer: Alan Silvestri (1988–1991); Various (1991–present)
- Opening theme: Back to the Future (1988–1991)
- Country of origin: Brazil
- Original language: Portuguese

Original release
- Network: TV Cultura
- Release: 29 December 1986

Jornal da Cultura (Culture News) is a long-running Brazilian TV program currently running on TV Cultura. It hosts many notable Brazilian figures and intellectuals, such as the historian Marco Antonio Villa, the philosopher Luiz Felipe Pondé, the physician Paulo Saldiva, and many other economists, philosophers and notable individuals. It first aired on 29 December 1986 under the direction of Hamilton Tramontá. Currently, the program is hosted by the Brazilian TV Host Willian Corrêa. On the normal schedule, the program runs everyday except for weekends.

== Guests ==
Every day of the week, the program invites at least two academic guests to discuss openly about diverse subjects and topics. Known figures such as Carlos Novaes, Demétrio Magnoli, Maristela Basso, Ricardo Abramovay, Vladimir Safatle, Alexandre Schwartsman, Ethevaldo Siqueira, Mario Sergio Cortella and Paulo Lins have appeared on the show. Notable ones who are often on the program include:

- Leandro Karnal - historian
- Luiz Felipe Pondé - philosopher
- Luiz Flávio Gomes - jurist
- Marco Antonio Villa - historian
- Paulo Saldiva - physician
