= CNN Brasil =

Brazilian news-based pay television

- Country: Brazil
- Broadcast area: Brazil; YouTube (International)
- Network: CNN
- Headquarters: Av. Paulista 1374 - Bella Vista, São Paulo (SP)

Programming
- Language: Portuguese
- Picture format: 1080i HDTV (downscaled to letterboxed 480i for the SDTV feed)

Ownership
- Owner: Novus Mídia S.A. (Rubens Menin)
- Key people: João Camargo (CEO)
- Sister channels: CNN Brazil Money; CNN Brazil Esportes (planned); CNN Brazil Pop (planned); CNN Brazil Agro (planned); CNN; CNN International

History
- Launched: 15 March 2020; 6 years ago

Links
- Website: cnnbrasil.com.br

Availability

Streaming media
- CNNBrasil.com.br: Live Stream
- YouTube: Live Stream

CNN Brazil Online
- Website type: News
- Available in: Portuguese
- Founded: March 15, 2020; 6 years ago
- Headquarters: São Paulo
- Country of origin: Brazil
- Owners: Novus Mídia S.A. (Rubens Menin); Skydance Corporation (Brand licensing of CNN)
- Website: www.cnnbrasil.com.br
- Current status: Active

Cable News Network Brasil, also known as CNN Brasil and abbreviated as CNN BR, is a Brazilian news-based pay television channel and news website. Launched on 15 March 2020, CNN Brasil is owned by Novus Mídia, a joint-venture between Douglas Tavolaro, former header of Record's news division, and Rubens Menin, owner of MRV Engenharia. Novus Mídia has a licensing agreement with the original CNN channel owned by Skydance through CNN Worldwide. CNN Brasil is the second local franchise of CNN in South America, after CNN Chile.

Its headquarters are in São Paulo, with offices in Rio de Janeiro and Brasília, besides international bureaus with almost 400 journalists. Previously, in 2017, the channel did a partnership with RedeTV! and Simba Content, formed by SBT and Record, which had no success.

Programs are aired 24 hours daily via digital terrestrial TV networks, pay TV providers in Brazil; and live streaming services for overseas viewers.

== History ==
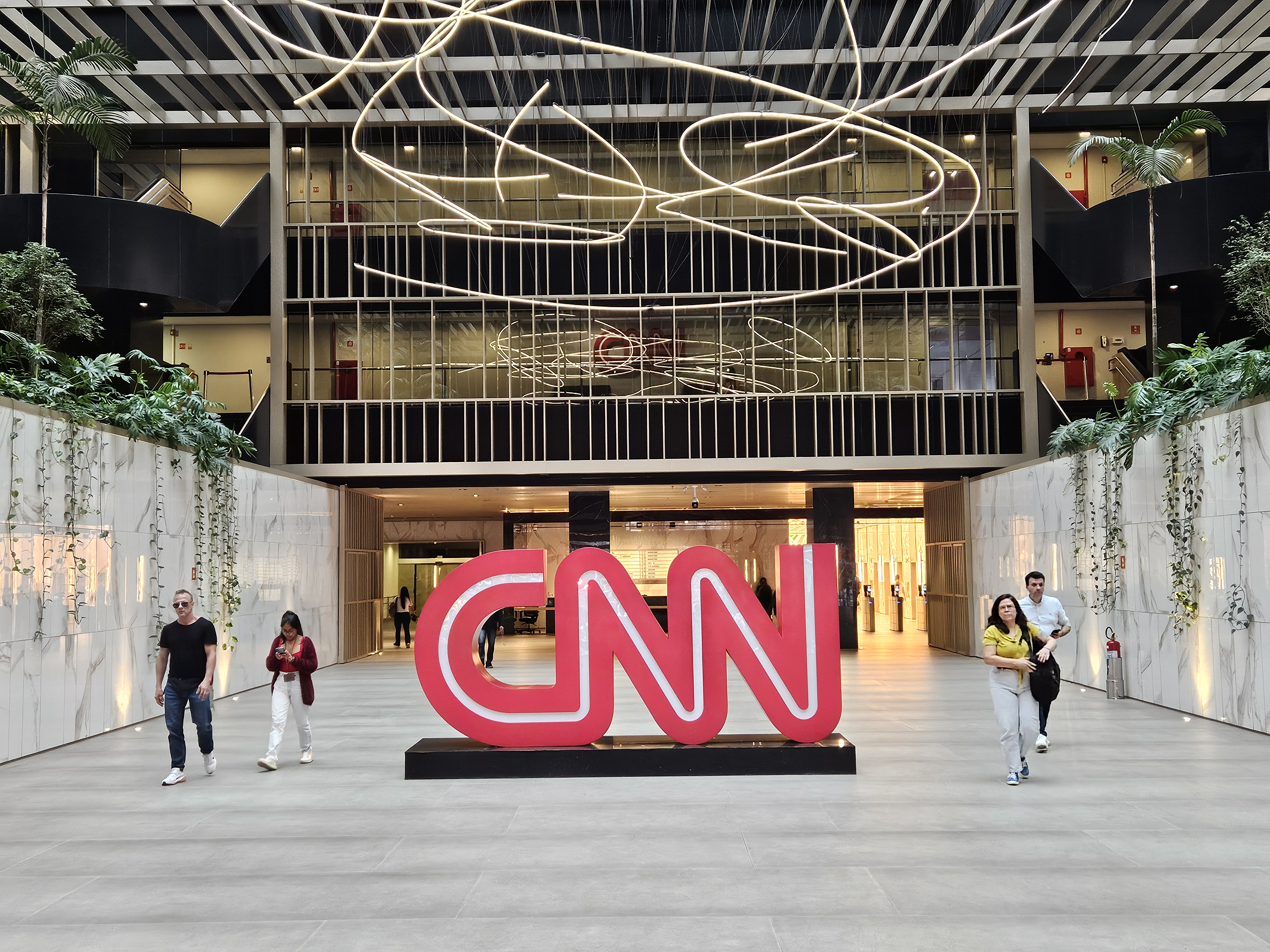
CNN Brasil headquarters in Avenida Paulista, São Paulo

After the launch of CNN Chile in 2008, the company looked to enter the Portuguese language market, one of the only ones still not covered by the many affiliates of the brand around the world. In 2019, it was announced that the broadcaster would act in Brazil, with local strategic partners. The business montage in Brazil was in charge of the businessman Rubens Menin, with a vast and well-known performance in the civic construction and financial markets, and the journalist Douglas Tavolaro, co-founder and CEO of the new channel.

Initially, the first announced names to act in CNN Brasil came from companies such as Globo, Record, BBC and Band. On 4 June 2019, two former TV Globo presenters were announced. Evaristo Costa and William Waack were hired to, respectively, present a show in CNN London headquarters, with a mix of journalism and entertainment, and the second, a TV news during prime time, from Mondays to Fridays. The premiere of the pay television channel is predicted to second semester of 2019. It is expected that CNN Brasil will also have a strong online presence, covering all social medias and innovating in the distribution of journalistic content through these platforms.

On Tuesday, 18 June, images of the CNN Brasil headquarters were published in the broadcaster official profile. The location was in Paulista Avenue, in the district of Bela Vista, in front of the São Paulo Metro station Trianon-Masp. The building has more than 4,000 square metres (43,000 sq ft) and was the Banco Real operations center. According to the founder-partner and Chairman of CNN Brazil, Douglas Tavolaro, the decision to establish the future news channel in that place was "strategic", aiming a larger approach with the audience. "We want to be part of the everyday life of the Brazilians and be integrated with the audience. Because of that, the chose to be in the pulsing center and postcard of the largest city in the country, next to the people", said Tavolaro.

On 22 July 2019, the broadcaster announced the hiring of the couple Mari Palma and Phelipe Siani.

On 25 July 2019, CNN Brasil announced the hiring of its first black journalist, Luciana Barreto.

On 3 August 2019, journalist Monalisa Perrone left TV Globo to accept "an irrefusable offer" made by CNN Brasil.

Famous TV reporter and TV presenter Reinaldo Gottino left RecordTV on 16 September 2019 to join CNN Brasil, being the first reporter who wasn't a TV Globo employee to join the new broadcaster. On 4 November, the network hired TV Verdes Mares anchor Taís Lopes (who had guest-anchored Globo's Jornal Nacional as part of a 50th anniversary tribute).

For a brief period in February 2021, CNN Brasil was relayed without authorization on TV Colinas, a terrestrial television station in Colinas do Tocantins. Due to legal judicial action, the affiliation ceased.

== CNN Brasil staff ==
Anchors

- Carol Nogueira
- Debora Bergamasco
- Elisa Veeck
- Gabriel Monteiro (CNN Money)
- Gustavo Uribe
- Iuri Pitta
- Leandro Magalhães
- Márcio Gomes
- Muriel Porfiro
- Tainá Falcão
- William Waack

Presenters

- Benjamin Back
- Carlos Sembrana
- Daniela Filomeno
- Henrique Kirilauskas
- Jairo Nascimento
- João Vítor Xavier
- Julliana Lopes
- Ludmila Candal
- Mari Palma
- Phelipe Siani
- Roberto Kalil

Analysts

- Antonio Lavareda (Politics)
- Caio Junqueira (Politics)
- Clarissa Oliveira (Politics)
- Daniel Rittner (Politics)
- Débora Oliveira (Economy)
- Edilene Lopes (Politics)
- Fernanda Magnotta (International)
- Fernando Nakagawa (Economy)
- Julliana Lopes (Politics)
- Jussara Soares (Politics)
- Larissa Rodrigues (Politics)
- Luisa Martins (Justice)
- Lourival Sant'Anna (International)
- Pedro Côrtes (Environment and Climate)
- Pedro Venceslau (Politics)
- Teo Cury (Politics)
- Thaís Herédia (Economy)
- Victor Irajá (Economy)

Commentators

- Caio Coppolla
- Hélio Beltrão
- José Eduardo Cardozo
- Marcelo Tripoli (Innovation)
- Maurício Borges (Mano, Sports)
- Mauricio Pestana (Inclusion)
- Michel Bastos (Sports)
- Vinicius Poit

Correspondents

- Américo Martins (London)
- Luciana Taddeo (Buenos Aires)
- Mariana Janjácomo (New York)
- Priscila Yazbek (Paris)

Reporters

- Adriana de Luca (São Paulo)
- Bruno Araújo (Recife)
- Bruno Teixeira (São Paulo)
- Camila Tíssia (Salvador)
- Caroline Rosito (Brasília)
- Cleber Rodrigues (Rio de Janeiro)
- Daniela Mallmann (Belo Horizonte)
- Elijonas Maia (Brasília)
- Gabriela Garcia (Porto Alegre)
- Gabriela Milanezi (São Paulo)
- Gabriela Prado (Brasília)
- Gabbriela Veras (Brasília)
- Guilherme Rajão (São Paulo)
- Luciana Amaral (Brasília)
- Maércio Ramos (São Paulo)
- Monique Cardone (Rio de Janeiro)
- Pedro Teixeira (Brasília)
- Rachel Amorim (Rio de Janeiro)
- Rafaela Cascardo (Rio de Janeiro)
- Renan Fiuza (São Paulo)
- Rodrigo Monteiro (Rio de Janeiro)
- Stêvão Limana (São Paulo)
- Taísa Medeiros (Brasília)
- Tayana Narcisa (Belém)

Former integrants

- Abílio Diniz (deceased in 2024)
- Adriano Pires
- Alana Araújo (TV Diário)
- Alexandre Borges (O Antagonista/Revista Valete)
- Alexandre Garcia (Revista Oeste/Canal Rural)
- Alexandre Schwartsman (CBN)
- Alisson Negrini (RedeTV!/CNN Portugal)
- Amábyle Sandri (Amabilices)
- Ananda Vasconcelos
- André Janvaski (Brazil Journal)
- André Mifano
- André Spigariol
- Anne Barbosa
- Anthony Wells (Jovem Pan)
- Antônio Batista da Silva Junior
- Aod Cunha
- Arianna Fonseca (Rádio Justiça)
- Augusto de Arruda Botelho (UOL)
- Bárbara Baião (Jota)
- Basília Rodrigues
- Bel Campos
- Boris Casoy
- Bruna Carvalho (SBT Rio)
- Bruna Macedo
- Bruna Ostermann
- Bruno Garschagen
- Bruno Salles
- Camila Olivo
- Camila Salles
- Carla Bridi (Associated Press)
- Carla Vilhena
- Carlos Tramontina
- Carmem Perez
- Carolina Abelin (Record)
- Carolina Brígido (UOL)
- Carolina Queiroz (TV A Crítica)
- Caroline Louise (TV Goiânia)
- Cassius Zeilmann (BandNews TV)
- Chico Prado
- Cláudia Costin
- Cristiane Dias (WSL)
- Daniela Lima (GloboNews)
- Daniel Castanho
- Danúbia Braga (Jovem Pan)
- Débora Freitas (CBN)
- Diego Barros
- Diego Mendes
- Diego Rezende (América TV)
- Diego Sarza (UOL)
- Eduardo Carvalho (UOL)
- Elis Barreto (Arko Adivce)
- Erika Bechara
- Evandro Cini (Jovem Pan)
- Evaristo Costa
- Fabíola Kassin
- Felipe Boldrini (EPTV Campinas)
- Felipe Moura Brasil (Estado de SP/Rádio Eldorado/Rádio Jornal/O Antagonista/Crusoé)
- Flávia Duarte
- Fernando Gomes
- Fernando Molica
- Gabriela Araújo
- Gabriela Prioli (GNT)
- Gabrielle Ravasco
- Galton Sé (TV Brasil)
- Gisele Soares
- Glória Vanique
- Heloísa Villela
- Iara Maggioni
- Iara Oliveira
- Iberê Thenório
- Igor Gadelha (Metrópoles)
- Isabella Faria (Folha de SP)
- Isabelle Saleme
- Isadora Aires
- Janaína Paschoal
- Jaqueline Frizon (Record)
- Jhonatã Gabriel (TVE Bahia)
- João Carlos Borda
- João Carlos Martins
- João Venturi (SBT)
- Joel Pinheiro da Fonseca (GloboNews)
- Joyce Murasaki
- Karine Gonzaga
- Karla Chaves
- Kenzô Machida (SBT Brasília)
- Kléber
- Lara Mota (TV Iguaçu)
- Larissa Alvarenga (InterTV)
- Larissa Calderari (TV Globo SP)
- Leandro Karnal
- Leandro Narloch (Folha de São Paulo)
- Leandro Resende (CBN Rio de Janeiro)
- Letícia Vidica (TV Globo)
- Lucas Madureira (TV Globo RJ)
- Luciana Barreto (TV Brasil)
- Lucilene Kaxinawá (SIC TV)
- Luiza Duarte
- Luiza Muttoni
- Luiza Tenan
- Manuella Niclewicz (RICtv)
- Marcela Monteiro
- Marcela Rahal
- Marcelo Favalli (CNBC Brasil)
- Marco Antônio Villa (Jovem Pan)
- Marcos Fava Neves
- Marcos Jank
- Marina Demori (Times Brasil)
- Mateus Koelzer (RedeTV! Rio)
- Matheus Meirelles (Globo São Paulo)
- Mathias Brotero (Record)
- Maurício Noriega (Record/Rádio Transamérica)
- Mica Rocha
- Monalisa Perrone
- Natália André (Metrópoles)
- Neca Setubal
- Nicole Fusco (Jovem Pan)
- Nina Silva
- Nohlan Hubertus
- Núria Saldanha
- Patrícia Travassos
- Paula Brazão (TV Gazeta Vitória)
- Paula Martini (Valor Econômico)
- Paula Nobre
- Pedro Andrade
- Pedro Duran
- Pedro Nogueira
- Poliana Mazzo
- Rachel Vargas
- Rafael Colombo (Globo SP/CBN)
- Raquel Landim (UOL)
- Reinaldo Gottino (Record)
- Renan de Souza
- Renan Quinalha
- Renata Agostini (O Globo/CBN)
- Renata Varandas
- Ricardo Caldas (TV Brasil)
- Ricardo Pereira (BandNews FM PR)
- Rita Lisauskas (TV Cultura/Estado de SP/Rádio Eldorado)
- Rita Wu (CNBC Brasil)
- Roberta Russo (BandNews FM)
- Roberto Nonato (Jovem Pan
- Roberto Tardelli
- Rubens Barbosa
- Rudá Moreira (R7)
- Samantha Meyer
- Sandro Zeppi
- Sérgio Vale
- Sid Marcus (Rede Minas/TV Justiça MG)
- Sidney Rezende (Super Rádio Tupi)
- Silvana Freire
- Soraya Lauand (Jovem Pan)
- Stephanie Alves
- Stéphanie Fleury
- Suzana Busanello
- Tainá Farfán (Record)
- Taís Lopes (TV Verdes Mares)
- Talis Mauricio (TV ALESP)
- Thais Arbex (Ministério da Justiça)
- Thiago Anastácio
- Tiago Américo (Jovem Pan)
- Tomé Abduch
- Victor Bonini
- Victor Moraes
- Vinícius Costa (Rede Integração)

== Programming ==
Weekdays
BRT	Program	Host(s)
5:55a-9a	CNN Novo Dia	Carol Nogueira
9a-12p	Live CNN	Elisa Veeck
12p-3p	Bastidores CNN	Gustavo Uribe; Tainá Falcão
3p-6p	CNN 360°	Iuri Pitta; Debora Bergamasco
6p-8p	CNN Arena	Leandro Magalhães
8p-10p	CNN Prime Time	Márcio Gomes
10p-11p	WW	William Waack
11p-11:30p	O Grande Debate	Julliana Lopes
11:30p-12a, Tuesdays	No Lucro CNN	Phelipe Siani
11:30p-12a, Fridays	The Golf Brasil	Henrique Kirilauskas
Saturday
BRT	Program	Host(s)
6:0a-9:30a	CNN Newsroom Sábado	Rotation of Presenters
9:30a-12:45p	Agora CNN Sábado	Rotation of Presenters
3p-5:45p	Agora CNN Sábado	Rotation of Presenters
8p-10p	CNN Primetime Sábado	Rotation of Presenters
Sunday
BRT	Program	Host(s)
6a-9:30a	CNN Newsroom Domingo	Rotation of Presenters
9:30a-12:15p	Agora CNN Domingo	Rotation of Presenters
1p-2:30p	DominGOL com Benja	Benjamin Back
2:30p-5:15p	Agora CNN Domingo	Rotation of Presenters
8p-8:45p	CNN Primetime Domingo	Rotation of presenters
8:45p-9:15p	É Negócio	Carlos Sembrana
9:15p-10p	CNN Esportes S/A	João Vítor Xavier
10p-11p	WW - Edição Especial	William Waack

CNN Brasil Soft

Program	Host(s)
CNN Séries Originais	Muriel Porfiro
CNN Sinais Vitais	Roberto Kalil
CNN Viagem & Gastronomia	Daniela Filomeno

Former programs

Program	Terms	Host(s)
Anthony Bourdain: Lugares Desconhecidos	2020-2021	André Mifano
À Prioli	2021-2022	Gabriela Prioli
Caminhos	2022-2023	Abílio Diniz
CNN Brasil Meio-Dia	2023-2024	Luciana Barreto; Muriel Porfiro
CNN Carteira Inteligente	2020	Fernando Nakagawa
CNN Eleições: 2026 Já Começou	2025	Clarissa Oliveira; Antônio Lavareda
CNN Entrevistas	2020-2025	variety
CNN Freedom Project	2023	Carlos Tramontina
CNN Líderes	2020	Raquel Landim
CNN Manhã	2020-2023	Roberto Nonato; Nicole Fusco; Stêvão Limana
CNN Produções Especiais	2021-2022	Glória Vanique
CNN Sábado/Domingo	2020-2022	Rotation of presenters
CNN Soft Business	2021-2022	Philipe Siani; Fernando Nakagawa
CNN Tonight	2020-2021	Gabriela Prioli, Mari Palma and Leandro Karnal
Dossiê CNN	2020	Monalisa Perrone
Entre Mundos	2021-2022	Pedro Andrade
Expresso CNN	2020-2022	Monalisa Perrone; Elisa Veck and Evandro Cini
GPS CNN	2024-2025	Iuri Pitta
Jornal da CNN	2020-2022	William Waack; Monalisa Perrone
MiConta	2023	Mica Rocha
Olhares Brasileiros	2022	Abílio Diniz
O Ponto	2020; 2024-2025	Caio Junqueira; Renata Agostini; Clarissa Oliveira
Popverso CNN	2022-2023	Phelipe Siani and Mari Palma
Projeto Upload	2021-2022	Stéphanie Fleury
Realidade CNN	2020-2021	Luciana Barreto
Universo Karnal	2022-2023	Leandro Karnal
Visão CNN	2020-2023	Cassius Zeilmann; Luciana Barreto; Carla Vilhena; Roberta Russo
