= 2005 in Brazilian football =

Football in Brazil
- Season: 2005

The following article presents a summary of the 2005 football (soccer) season in Brazil, which was the 104th season of competitive football in the country.

== Campeonato Brasileiro Série A ==
Pos	Team	Pld	W	D	L	GF	GA	GD	Pts	Qualification or relegation
1	Corinthians (Note: As champions, Corinthians retain the right to participate in both libertadores and sudamericana in 2006.)	42	24	9	9	87	59	+28	81	Qualified for the 2006 Copa Libertadores
2	Internacional	42	23	9	10	72	49	+23	78	Qualified for the 2006 Copa Libertadores
3	Goiás	42	22	8	12	68	51	+17	74	Qualified for the 2006 Copa Libertadores
4	Palmeiras	42	20	10	12	81	65	+16	70	Qualified for the 2006 Copa Libertadores
5	Fluminense	42	19	11	12	79	70	+9	68	Qualified for the 2006 Copa Sudamericana
6	Atlético Paranaense	42	18	7	17	76	67	+9	61	Qualified for the 2006 Copa Sudamericana
7	Paraná	42	17	10	15	59	51	+8	61	Qualified for the 2006 Copa Sudamericana
8	Cruzeiro	42	17	9	16	73	72	+1	60	Qualified for the 2006 Copa Sudamericana
9	Botafogo	42	17	8	17	57	56	+1	59	Qualified for the 2006 Copa Sudamericana
10	Santos	42	16	11	15	68	71	−3	59	Qualified for the 2006 Copa Sudamericana
11	São Paulo (Note: Despite qualifying for the Copa Sudamericana, São Paulo cannot participate in 2006 as they are already qualified for the Libertadores as defending champions. The seed has already been reallocated to Vasco da Gama.)	42	16	10	16	77	67	+10	58	Qualified for the 2006 Copa Libertadores
12	Vasco da Gama	42	15	11	16	74	84	−10	56	Qualified for the 2006 Copa Sudamericana
13	Fortaleza	42	16	7	19	58	64	−6	55	
14	Juventude	42	15	10	17	66	72	−6	55	
15	Flamengo	42	14	13	15	56	60	−4	55	
16	Figueirense	42	14	11	17	65	72	−7	53	
17	São Caetano	42	14	10	18	54	60	−6	52	
18	Ponte Preta	42	15	6	21	63	80	−17	51	
19	Coritiba	42	13	10	19	51	60	−9	49	Relegated to série B in 2006
20	Atlético Mineiro	42	13	8	21	54	59	−5	47	Relegated to série B in 2006
21	Paysandu	42	12	5	25	63	92	−29	41	Relegated to série B in 2006
22	Brasiliense	42	10	11	21	47	67	−20	41	Relegated to série B in 2006

Notes:

Corinthians declared as the Campeonato Brasileiro champions.

=== Relegation ===
The four worst placed teams, which are Coritiba, Atlético Mineiro, Paysandu and Brasiliense, were relegated to the following year's second level.

== Campeonato Brasileiro Série B ==
Final stage
Pos	Team	Pld	W	D	L	GF	GA	GD	Pts
1	Grêmio (P)	6	3	3	0	8	4	+4	12
2	Santa Cruz (P)	6	3	1	2	7	8	−1	10
3	Náutico	6	2	0	4	6	6	0	6
4	Portuguesa	6	1	2	3	9	12	−3	5

Source: RSSSFBrasil
(P) Promoted to 2006 Série A

Grêmio declared as the Campeonato Brasileiro Série B champions.

=== Promotion ===
The two best placed teams in the final stage of the competition, which are Grêmio and Santa Cruz, were promoted to the following year's first level.

=== Relegation ===
The six worst placed teams, which are Vitória, Bahia, Anapolina, União Barbarense, Criciúma and Caxias, were relegated to the following year's third level.

== Campeonato Brasileiro Série C ==
Final stage
Pos	Team	Pld	W	D	L	GF	GA	GD	Pts	Qualification or relegation
1	Remo (C, P)	6	3	1	2	7	5	+2	10	Promoted to 2006 Campeonato Brasileiro Série B
2	América de Natal (P)	6	3	1	2	8	7	+1	10	Promoted to 2006 Campeonato Brasileiro Série B
3	Ipatinga	6	2	3	1	8	7	+1	9	
4	Novo Hamburgo	6	1	1	4	8	12	−4	4	

Source: Bola na Área
Rules for classification: 1) points; 2) wins; 3) goal difference; 4) goals scored; 5) head-to-head results.
(C) Champions; (P) Promoted

Remo declared as the Campeonato Brasileiro Série C champions.

=== Promotion ===
The two best placed teams in the final stage of the competition, which are Remo and América-RN, were promoted to the following year's second level.

== Copa do Brasil ==
The Copa do Brasil final was played between Paulista and Fluminense.

June 15, 2005

Paulista	2–0	Fluminense

Jayme Cintra

June 22, 2005

Fluminense	0–0	Paulista

São Januário

Paulista declared as the cup champions by aggregate score of 2-0.

== State championship champions ==
State	Champion	State	Champion
Acre	Rio Branco	Paraíba	Treze
Alagoas	ASA	Paraná	Atlético-PR
Amapá	São José-AP	Pernambuco	Santa Cruz
Amazonas	Grêmio Coariense	Piauí	Parnahyba
Bahia	Vitória	Rio de Janeiro	Fluminense
Ceará	Fortaleza	Rio Grande do Norte	ABC FC
Distrito Federal	Brasiliense	Rio Grande do Sul	Internacional
Espírito Santo	Serra	Rondônia	Vilhena
Goiás	Vila Nova	Roraima	São Raimundo-RR
Maranhão	Imperatriz	Santa Catarina	Criciúma
Mato Grosso	Vila Aurora	São Paulo	São Paulo
Mato Grosso do Sul	CENE	Sergipe	Itabaiana
Minas Gerais	Ipatinga	Tocantins	Colinas
Pará	Paysandu		

== Youth competition champions ==
Competition	Champion
Copa Cultura de Juniores	Flamengo
Copa Macaé de Juvenis	Internacional
Copa Santiago de Futebol Juvenil	Internacional
Copa São Paulo de Juniores	Corinthians
Copa Sub-17 de Promissão	Cruzeiro
Taça Belo Horizonte de Juniores	Atlético Mineiro

== Other competition champions ==
Competition	Champion
Copa Espírito Santo	Estrela do Norte
Copa FGF	Novo Hamburgo
Copa FPF	Noroeste
Copa Governador do Mato Grosso	Operário-VG
Copa Integração	Salgueiro
Copa Pernambuco	Salgueiro
Copa Rio	Tigres do Brasil
Finta International Cup	Volta Redonda
Taça Minas Gerais	América-MG

== Brazilian clubs in international competitions ==
Team	Copa Libertadores 2005	Copa Sudamericana 2005	Recopa Sudamericana 2005	FIFA Club World Championship 2005
Atlético Paranaense	Runner-up	did not qualify	N/A	N/A
Corinthians	did not qualify	Quarterfinals	N/A	N/A
Cruzeiro	did not qualify	Round of 16	N/A	N/A
Fluminense	did not qualify	Quarterfinals	N/A	N/A
Goiás	did not qualify	Preliminary round	N/A	N/A
Internacional	did not qualify	Quarterfinals	N/A	N/A
Juventude	did not qualify	Preliminary round	N/A	N/A
Palmeiras	Round of 16	did not qualify	N/A	N/A
Santo André	Group stage	did not qualify	N/A	N/A
Santos	Quarterfinals	Preliminary round	N/A	N/A
São Paulo	Champions	Preliminary round	N/A	Champions

== Brazil national team ==
The following table lists all the games played by the Brazil national football team in official competitions and friendly matches during 2005.

Date	Opposition	Result	Score	Brazil scorers	Competition
February 9, 2005	Hong Kong	W	7–1	Lúcio, Roberto Carlos, Oliveira (2), Ronaldinho, Robinho, Alex	Carlsberg Cup
March 27, 2005	Peru	W	1–0	Kaká	World Cup Qualifying
March 30, 2005	Uruguay	D	1–1	Emerson	World Cup Qualifying
April 27, 2005	Guatemala	W	3–0	Anderson, Romário, Grafite	International Friendly
June 5, 2005	Paraguay	W	4–1	Ronaldinho (2), Zé Roberto, Robinho	World Cup Qualifying
June 8, 2005	Argentina	L	1–3	Roberto Carlos	World Cup Qualifying
June 16, 2005	Greece	W	3–0	Adriano, Robinho, Juninho	Confederations Cup
June 19, 2005	Mexico	L	0–1	-	Confederations Cup
June 22, 2005	Japan	D	2–2	Robinho, Ronaldinho	Confederations Cup
June 25, 2005	Germany	W	3–2	Adriano (2), Ronaldinho	Confederations Cup
June 29, 2005	Argentina	W	4–1	Adriano (2), Kaká, Ronaldinho	Confederations Cup
August 17, 2005	Croatia	D	1–1	Ricardinho	International Friendly
September 4, 2005	Chile	W	5–0	Juan, Robinho, Adriano (3)	World Cup Qualifying
September 4, 2005	(Spain) Sevilla	D	1–1	Alfaro (own goal)	International Friendly (unofficial match)
October 9, 2005	Bolivia	D	1–1	Juninho	World Cup Qualifying
October 12, 2005	Venezuela	W	3–0	Adriano, Ronaldo, Roberto Carlos	World Cup Qualifying
November 12, 2005	United Arab Emirates	W	8–0	Kaká, Adriano, Fred (2), Lúcio, Juninho (2), Cicinho	International Friendly

== Women's football ==
=== Brazil women's national football team ===
The following table lists all the games played by the Brazil women's national football team in official competitions and friendly matches during 2005.

Date	Opposition	Result	Score	Brazil scorers	Competition
June 26, 2005	(United States) Concordia University	W	6–0	Michele, Kelly, Érika, Sheila (3)	International Friendly (unofficial match)
July 3, 2005	(Brazil) Campo Grande	?	?–?	unavailable	International Friendly (unofficial match)

=== Domestic competition champions ===
Competition	Champion
Campeonato Carioca	CEPE-Caxias (FFERJ/LND); Trindade (AFFER)
Campeonato Paulista	Extra/Fundesport
