= Romanian Brazilians =

Brazilian people of Romanian ancestry

Romanian Brazilians Romeno-Brasileiros
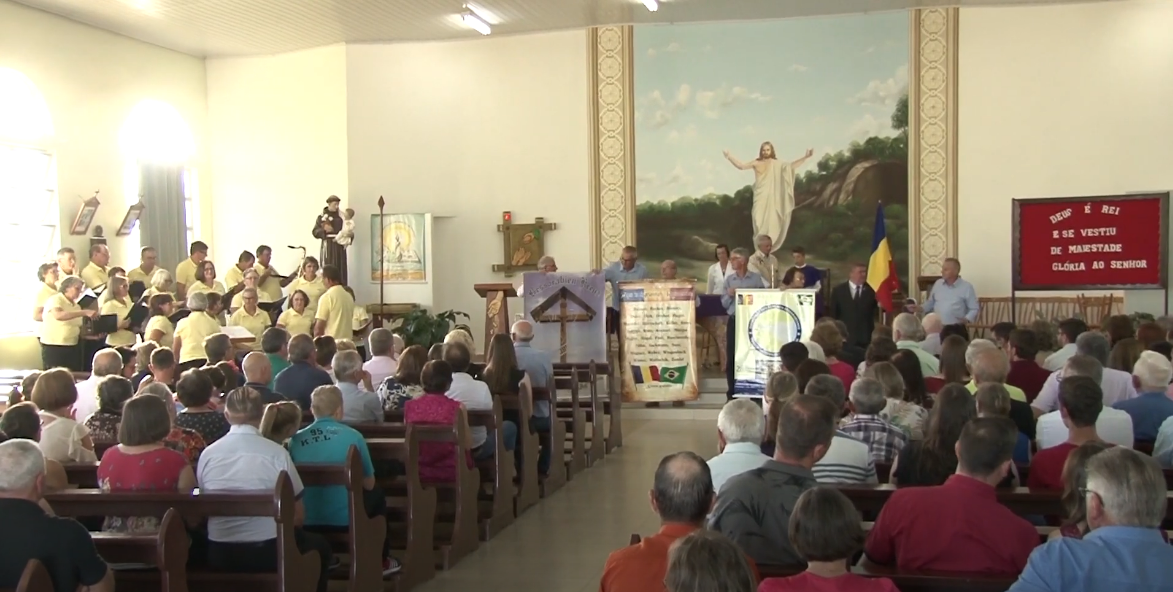
- Romanian from Bessarabia descendants in Brazil.

Total population
- 40,000

Regions with significant populations
- Mainly Southeastern Brazil

Languages
- Mainly Portuguese and Romanian

Religion
- Christianity (predominantly Orthodox or Catholic), and others

Related ethnic groups
- Other White Brazilians, Romanians

Romanian Brazilians (Romeno-brasileiro) are Brazilians of full, partial, or predominantly Romanian descent, or Romanian-born people residing in Brazil. According to 2008 estimates, there are around 200,000 Romanians or people of Romanian descent currently living in Brazil, although the Ministry of Foreign Affairs of Romania says there only are 7,393 Romanian citizens in Brazil and up to 40,000 Brazilians with some Romanian ancestry.

== History ==
In the beginning of the 20th century, migrants from Romania (and specifically from the Romanian province of Bessarabia (modern-day Moldova)) immigrated to Brazil. Among the Romanians, many were ethnic Germans, Jews and Poles who resided in Romania at the time. There were many reasons why Romanians emigrated to foreign countries: economic underdevelopment, political reasons and for reasons of adventure and exploration, but most importantly, the promise of free land - which never materialised. But for the majority of people who left their homes at the time the main reason was the economic situation. Romanian immigrants settled in several communities in the extreme west of Santa Catarina, mainly Mondaí and Itapiranga. In the community of Linha Santo Antônio, in the interior of the municipality of Itapiranga, there is today a replica of a cross in honor of the village of Krasna.

== Notable Romanian Brazilians ==
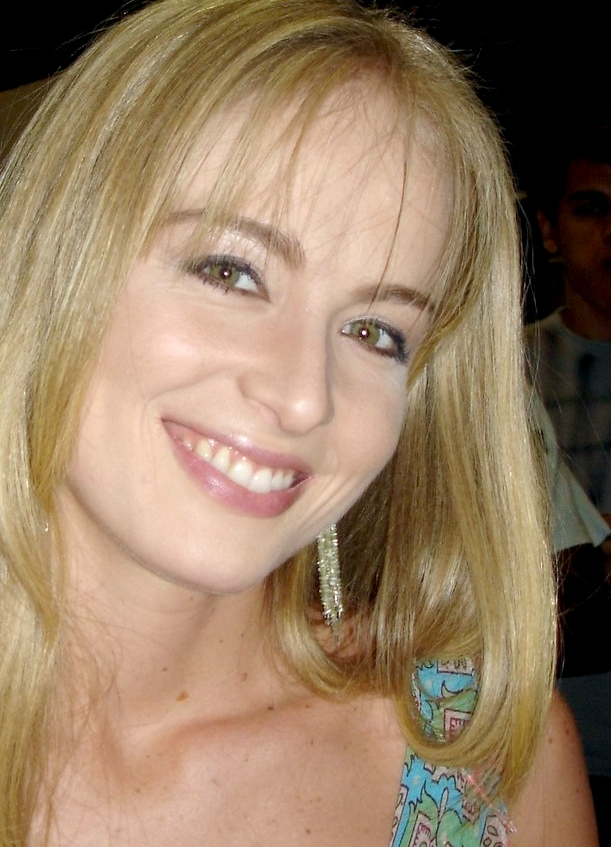
Angélica (television host)

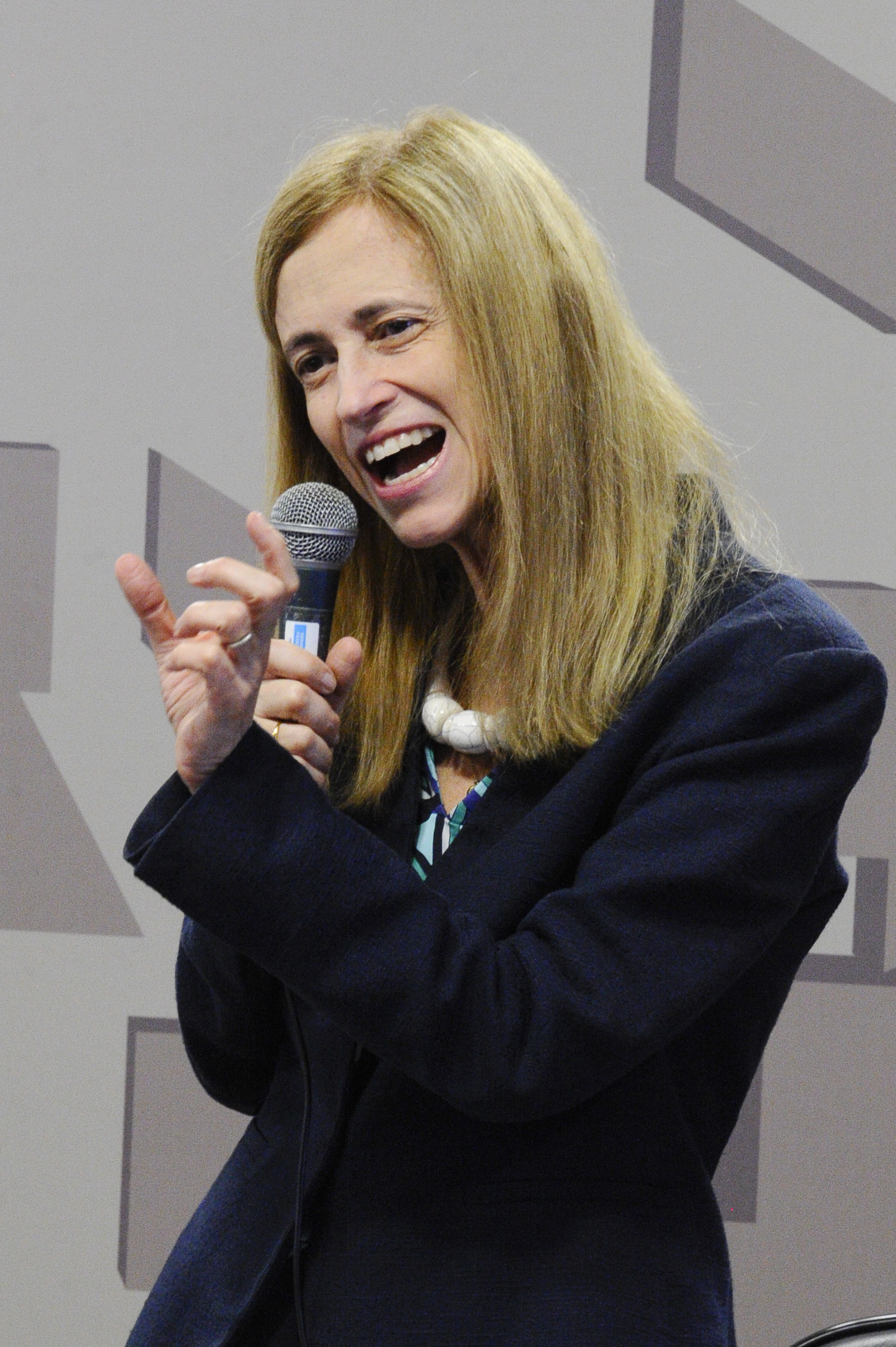
Cláudia Costin

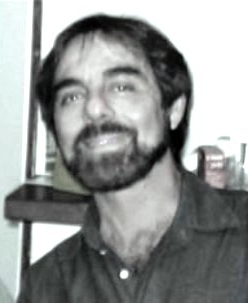
Aron Simis

- Dora Bria, windsurfing champion
- Nicolao Dumitru, football player

== See also ==
- Brazil–Romania relations
- Immigration to Brazil
- European immigration to Brazil
- Romanians
- List of Romanians
- Romanian diaspora
