= Karnal (disambiguation) =

Karnal is a city in India.

Karnal may also refer to:

- Karnal district, an Indian district in Haryana state
- Karnal division, an Indian administrative division which includes Karnal district
- Karnal (Lok Sabha constituency), a parliamentary constituency in Karnal district
  - Karnal (Vidhan Sabha constituency), one of nine seats in the parliamentary constituency
- Karnal Airport, an airstrip at the Indian city Karnal
- Karnal (instrument), a type of trumpet
- Of the Flesh a 1983 Philippine film called Karnal in Filipino
- Leandro Karnal, (born 1963), a Brazilian philosopher, historian, and university professor

== See also ==
- Carnal
- Kurnool
