= TV Colinas =

Television station in Colinas do Tocantins, Brazil

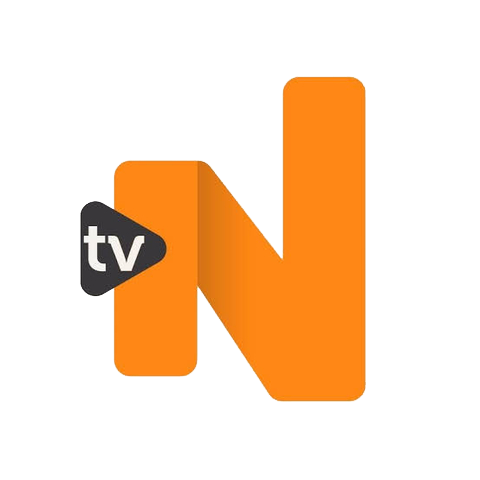
- Colinas do Tocantins, Tocantins; Brazil
- Channels: Digital: 46 (UHF); Virtual: 10

Programming
- Affiliations: SBT

Ownership
- Owner: Grupo Norte de Comunicação; (Sistema de Comunicação Graciosa Ltda.)

History
- First air date: June 19, 2009
- Last air date: April 22, 2025
- Former names: TV Colinas (2009-2025)
- Former channel numbers: Analog: 5 (VHF, 2009–2012); 7 (VHF, 2014–2020)
- Former affiliations: SBT (2009–12); TV Brasil (2014–17); RecordTV (2017–20); CNN Brasil (2021) (Note: Illegal relay.); Rede Meio (2021–2025)

Technical information
- Licensing authority: ANATEL
- ERP: 0.2 kW
- Transmitter coordinates: 8°03′23.6″S 48°28′40.9″W

Links
- Public license information: Profile

TV Norte Colinas (channel 10) is a Brazilian television station based in Colinas do Tocantins, a city in the state of Tocantins. The station is an SBT affiliate and is part of the TV Norte complex.

== History ==
=== First phase (2009-2012) ===
In February 2009, radio broadcaster Valmir de Freitas and businessman and farmer Wellington Luis de Faria became leaseholders of the concession of channel 5 VHF in Colinas do Tocantins, owned by Grupo Boa Sorte de Comunicação (owner of TV Araguaína, then SBT's affiliate in Araguaína). TV Colinas began its operations on the channel on June 19 of the same year with the presence of the then state governor Marcelo Miranda, retransmitting SBT programming. In July 2012, the broadcaster was reported to ANATEL for irregularities in the granting after a meeting between coalitions about free electoral hours on TV. The channel went off air, after the notification, on August 22.

=== Second phase (2014-2020) ===
In June 2014, Valmir de Freitas signed an agreement with Fundação RedeSat, then controller of TVE Tocantins (affiliated with TV Brasil), for the return of the operation of TV Colinas through the leasing of the concession of VHF channel 7, belonging to Sistema de Tocantins Communication (at the time owned by former senator Eduardo Siqueira Campos, political ally of then governor Sandoval Cardoso), to which TV Jovem, affiliated with RecordTV in Palmas, belongs. The partnership lasted until January 2015, when it was discovered by journalist Maria Valéria Kurovsky, president of RedeSat, that the entity paid, through a "drawer contract", the salaries of fifteen employees, building rent and the energy bill station, in addition to providing a transmitter and cars. The contract was terminated, but the equipment was kept in the hands of the channel, which continued on the air retransmitting TV Brasil programming.

On April 21, 2017, the station affiliated with TV Jovem, the Record affiliate for Tocantins. On September 30, 2020, TV Colinas went off the air again. According to its management, the rental contract for channel 7 with TV Jovem was at a very high value and no agreement was reached with the Palmese station.

=== Third phase (2021-present) ===
After TV Jovem acquired its former license for channel 7, it was announced, on January 11, 2021, that TV Colinas would return in February, now on digital signal, and with an affiliation with TV Cultura. On February 12, however, the station announced a change in affiliation and that it would rebroadcast the cable news channel CNN Brasil.

On February 15, the station was relaunched through channel 10.1 (46 digital UHF; concession from Sistema de Comunicação Graciosa, owner of the defunct TV Graciosa, formerly affiliated with TV Cultura in Palmas) retransmitting CNN Brasil. Soon after, it was discovered that the channel was not aware of the illegal relays made by TV Colinas. The channel's representatives also informed that they would take legal action against the station. The following day, mentions of CNN on its Facebook page were removed. On the 18th, it became affiliated to Rede Meio Norte.

== Programming ==
In addition to retransmitting Rede Meio Norte's programming, TV Colinas shows the news program Colinas em Foco, presented by Valmir de Freitas and Kessia Rubia. Other programs made up the station's schedule and were discontinued:

- A Casa é Sua
- Balanço Geral Colinas
- CTV Notícias
- Eu Vi
- Repórter Colinas
- Verdade em Foco
