= Hora Um da Notícia =

- Genre: News program
- Directed by: Ricardo Vilella; Miguel Athayde
- Presented by: Tiago Scheuer
- Country of origin: Brazil
- Original language: Portuguese

Production
- Producers: Bárbara Bom Angelo; Camila Miguel
- Camera setup: Multiple-camera
- Running time: 60 minutes (2014–2018); 120 minutes (2018–present)
- Production company: Jornalismo Globo

Original release
- Network: TV Globo
- Release: 1 December 2014 – present

Related
- Telecurso (timeslot)

Hora Um da Notícia, also known as simply Hora Um, is an early morning two hour-long news program aired by the Brazilian television broadcaster TV Globo, which debuted on 1 December 2014, replacing the daily edition of the Globo Rural as well as the educational program Telecurso. Since 31 October 2025, it is presented by Tiago Scheuer.

== History ==
The development of Hora Um comes with the proposal to bring the major news in the early morning and the first morning news for a Brazilian who wakes increasingly earlier. The weather forecast would be anchored by Maria Julia Coutinho and would have correspondents in Lisbon, London, Rome, Jerusalem and Tokyo.

The news also appears to recover its leadership of the time, which was held by SBT. With the debut of this program, there is 4 hours of straight journalism and 9 hours of live programming.

On 3 September 2019, the main presenter Monalisa Perrone left both the news program and TV Globo as she has signed to host an upcoming prime-time news program on CNN Brazil. It was also announced that journalist Roberto Kovalick would be replacing her as presenter starting from 9 September.

On 30 October 2025, as part of reorganization of TV Globo's news department announced on 1 September, Kovalick presented Hora Um for the last time due to his reassignment as main presenter of Jornal Hoje, a position previously anchored by César Tralli. Beginning on 31 October 2025, Tiago Scheuer took over his role as main presenter of Hora Um.

== Main Presenters ==
- Tiago Scheuer (31 October 2025 – present)

Relief presenters

- Ana Paula Campos
- César Menezes
- Bruno Tavares

Weather forecast

- Marcelo Pereira
  - Cinthia Toledo (Relief presenter)

Sports block

- Alessandro Jodar
  - Renato Cury (Relief presenter)

=== Former presenters ===
- Monalisa Perrone (1 December 2014 – 3 September 2019)
- Roberto Kovalick (9 September 2019 – 30 October 2025)
