= Vladimir Safatle =

Brazilian philosopher

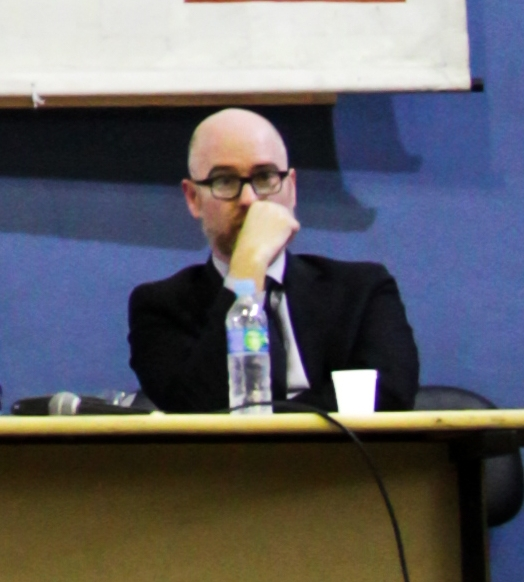
- Born: Vladimir Pinheiro Safatle; June 3, 1973 (age 53); Santiago, Chile

Philosophical work
- Era: Contemporary philosophy
- Main interests: Political philosophy • Philosophy of mind • Dialectic • Psychoanalysis

Vladimir Pinheiro Safatle (Santiago do Chile, born June 3, 1973) is a Brazilian philosopher, writer and musician. He is a professor of Theory of Human Sciences at the Faculty of Philosophy, Languages and Human Sciences, University of São Paulo (FFLCH-USP). He became widely known to the general public primarily through his work as a columnist for the newspaper Folha de S. Paulo. His intellectual production focuses on the areas of epistemology of psychoanalysis and psychology, political philosophy, critical theory and philosophy of music.

== Biography ==
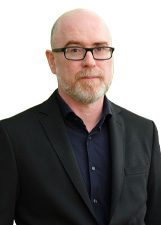
Vladimir Safatle’s candidacy for the position of federal deputy for São Paulo with the Socialism and Liberty Party (PSOL) in 2022.

Son of former guerrilla Fernando Safatle, who participated in the armed struggle against the dictatorship in Brazil as a member of the National Liberation Action, and Ilmeide Tavares Pinheiro, Vladimir Safatle was born in Santiago, Chile, in 1973. His family moved to Brazil due to Augusto Pinochet's rise to power, when Vladimir was just a few months old. In Brazil, they first settled in Brasília and, from 1987, in Goiânia, when his father took office as Secretary of Planning in the government of Goiás.

In 1991, he moved to São Paulo, where he began his university studies. He simultaneously studied philosophy at the University of São Paulo and advertising at the Escola Superior de Propaganda e Marketing (ESPM). In 1997, he completed his master's degree in philosophy at the University of São Paulo under the supervision of Bento Prado Júnior, with the thesis titled "O amor pela superfície: Jacques Lacan e o aparecimento do sujeito descentrado" (The Love for the Surface: Jacques Lacan and the Emergence of the Decentered Subject). In 2002 he completed his doctorate in "Spaces and transformations of philosophy" at the University Paris VIII, under the guidance of Alain Badiou. His doctoral dissertation, titled The Passion of the Negative: Modes of Subjectivation and Dialectics in Lacanian Clinic, was published in 2006 by Editora UNESP and translated into French in 2010 (Georg Olms Verlag).

Since 2003, Vladimir Safatle has been a professor in the Department of Philosophy at the University of São Paulo, becoming a full professor in 2019. He has also been a guest professor and researcher at various universities and institutions in Europe, Africa, and North America, including Paris I, Paris VII, Paris VIII, Paris X, Toulouse, Louvain, Stellenbosch Institute of Advanced Studies/South Africa, Essex, and Berkeley.

Alongside Christian Dunker and Nelson da Silva Jr., he founded and coordinates the Laboratory of Social Theory, Philosophy, and Psychoanalysis at USP (Latesfip-USP).

Safatle is also a composer, having composed soundtracks for plays such as Leite Derramado and Caesar, both by Roberto Alvim. For Caesar, he received the 2015 Aplauso Award for Best Original Soundtrack. In 2019, together with singer Fabiana Lian, he released the album Músicas de Superfície, with pieces for piano and voice composed between 1994 and 1998. In 2021, he released the album Tempo Tátil.

Between 2010 and 2019, he was a weekly columnist for the newspaper Folha de S. Paulo. He constantly appears on television programs, having been a political commentator for Jornal da Cultura for four years. He is currently a columnist for the newspaper El País.

With active political engagement, he delivered several public lectures during strikes and occupation events such as "Ocupa Sampa" and "Ocupa Salvador". He was invited by the Socialism and Liberty Party (PSOL), to run as a candidate for the Governorship of the State of São Paulo in the 2014 election. However, the candidacy did not advance due to internal disagreements.

In the 2022 election, he ran for federal deputy for São Paulo, but was not elected.

== Intellectual Trajectory ==
In his works, he proposes a reinterpretation of the dialectical tradition (especially Hegel, Marx, and Adorno) through the lens of Jacques Lacan's psychoanalytic theory, alongside a reformulation of classic Marxist categories such as fetishism, critique, and recognition. His philosophical project is grounded in the pursuit of constructing a subtractive ontology of the subject, informed by post-structuralist critiques of foundationalism. This subtractive ontology serves as a horizon for the reformulation of recognition theories and the reframing of productive dynamics within the fields of politics and aesthetics.

In his view, hegemonic theories of recognition (such as those presented by Axel Honneth and Charles Taylor) falter by relying on a deeply normative anthropology that ultimately naturalizes the identity-based assumptions of modern individuality. This is the central theme of Grande Hotel Abismo and is further explored in his subsequent book, O Circuito dos Afetos. The incorporation of Jacques Lacan's psychoanalytic reflection, with its notion of the decentered subject and its understanding of the productivity of experiences of negativity and helplessness, emerges as a way to provide a radically different framework for inscribing recognition demands. This framework enables the development of what the author calls "anti-predicative recognition". Politically, such anti-predicative recognition opens theoretical space for a post-identity politics, capable of operating through a non-substantial concept of universality. This universality drives the production of processes of deinstitutionalization and the creation of social zones of indetermination.

On the other hand, this project seeks to give space to that which, in subjects, does not conform to the figure of identity or to an egological reduction of subjectivity. It aims to unfold themes related to non-identity (Adorno) and decentering (Lacan). By refusing to limit the subject to the role of a foundation for the missteps of modern thought within the paths of representation and identity, his philosophy insists on the irreducibility of the centrality of the implicative functions inherent to the subject. Wherever there is implication in an event with its force of depersonalization and impersonality (paradoxically drawing on themes from Deleuze and French post-structuralism), there will always be a subject, however larval it may appear. In this sense, the concept of the subject could be reconstructed but not simply abandoned. Criticizing the anthropology embedded in the horizon of human essence does not, therefore, entail a critique of the subject as an implicative function.

Vladimir Safatle is one of the individuals responsible for the Brazilian edition of Theodor Adorno's Complete Works (Editora UNESP) and published, in 2019, Dar corpo ao impossível: o sentido da dialética a partir de Theodor Adorno (Giving Body to the Impossible: The Meaning of Dialectics in Theodor Adorno), in which he seeks to interpret Adorno's negative dialectics as a form of emerging dialectic driven by a continuous process. He also organized, together with Edson Telles, an important study on the military dictatorship and its ramifications in the present, titled O que resta da ditadura: a exceção brasileira (What Remains of the Dictatorship: The Brazilian Exception, Boitempo, 2010), in addition to studies on the collapse of Brazilian left-wing politics and its models (Só mais um esforço). He has also published contributions to the philosophy of music, cultural criticism, and psychoanalytic theory, as well as written the introduction to the Brazilian translations of works by contemporary philosophers such as Slavoj Žižek, Alain Badiou, and Judith Butler. Through Editora Ubu, he coordinates the Coleção Explosante (Explosive Collection), which has published books by Alain Badiou, Carlos Marighella, and Frantz Fanon.

== Books ==
- 2003 - Um limite tenso: Lacan entre a filosofia e a psicanálise. São Paulo: Editora Unesp
- 2004 - O tempo, o objeto e o avesso: ensaios de filosofia e psicanálise. Belo Horizonte: Autêntica (co-organization)
- 2006 - Sobre arte e psicanálise. São Paulo: Editora Escuta (co-organization)
- 2006 - A Paixão do Negativo: Lacan e a dialética São Paulo: Unesp.
- 2007 - Lacan. São Paulo: Publifolha (republicado pela Editora Autêntica).
- 2007 - Ensaios sobre música e filosofia. São Paulo: Editora Humanitas (co-organization)
- 2008 - A filosofia após Freud. São Paulo: Humanitas (co-organization)
- 2008 - Cinismo e falência da crítica. São Paulo: Boitempo.
- 2010 - La passion du négatif : Lacan et la dialectique. Hildesheim: Georg Olms Verlag.
- 2010 - Fetichismo : colonizar o Outro. Rio de Janeiro: Civilização Brasileira.
- 2010 - O que resta da ditadura: a exceção brasileira. São Paulo: Boitempo (co-organization)
- 2012 - A esquerda que não teme dizer seu nome. São Paulo: Três Estrelas.
- Grande hotel abismo: por uma reconstrução da teoria do reconhecimento. São Paulo: WMF Martins Fontes.
- 2013 - La Izquierda que no teme decir su nombre. Santiago: LOM Ediciones
- 2015 - O Circuito dos Afetos: Corpos Políticos, Desamparo e o Fim do Indivíduo São Paulo: Cosac Naify (republicado pela Editora Autêntica).
- 2016 - Grand Hotel Abyss: desire, recognition and the restoration of the subject. Leuven University Press
- 2016 - Quando as ruas queimam: manifesto pela emergência. São Paulo: N-1 edições
- 2017 - Só mais um esforço. São Paulo: Três Estrelas
- 2018 - Patologias do social: arqueologias do sofrimento psíquico. São Paulo: Autêntica (co-organization)
- 2018 - Um dia, esta luta iria ocorrer. São Paulo: N-1 edições
- 2019 - Dar corpo ao impossível: o sentido da dialética a partir de Theodor Adorno. Belo Horizonte. Autêntica
- 2019 - El circuito de los afectos: cuerpos politicos, desamparo y fin del individuo. Cali: Editorial Buonaventura
- 2020 - Maneiras de transformar mundo: Lacan, política e emancipação, Belo Horizonte, Autêntica
- 2021 - O neoliberalismo como gestão do sofrimento psíquico, Belo Horizonte : Autêntica (co-organization)
- 2022 - Em um com o impulso: experiência estética e emancipação social - Bloco I. São Paulo: Autêntica Editora.
- 2023 - Junho de 2013: rebelião fantasma. São Paulo: Boitempo. (co-author)
- 2024 - Alfabeto das colisões. São Paulo: Ubu Editora
