= Colinas Esporte Clube =

Brazilian football club

Colinas
- Full name: Colinas Esporte Clube
- Founded: March 8, 2001
- Ground: Bigodão, Colinas do Tocantins, Tocantins state, Brazil
- Capacity: 1,200
Home colours	Away colours

Colinas Esporte Clube, commonly known as Colinas, is a Brazilian football club based in Colinas do Tocantins, Tocantins state. They won the Campeonato Tocantinense once and competed once in the Copa do Brasil.

== History ==
The club was founded on January 5, 2001. They won the Campeonato Tocantinense in 2005. Colinas competed in the Copa do Brasil in 2006 when they were eliminated in the First Round by Paysandu.

== Honours ==
- Campeonato Tocantinense
  - Winners (1): 2005

== Stadium ==
Colinas Esporte Clube play their home games at Estádio José Wilson Alves Ferreira, nicknamed Bigodão. The stadium has a maximum capacity of 1,200 people.
