= Sustaining program =

A sustaining program is a radio or television program that, despite airing on a commercial broadcast station, does not have commercial sponsorship or advertising. This term, mostly used in the United States, was common in the early days of radio, but has become unfamiliar because of the nearly universal use of commercial advertising on radio and television.

== Network and commercial radio ==
Commercial radio stations began broadcasting in the early 1920s, but it would be over a decade before the concept of selling over-the-air advertising would catch on. Many radio stations were established by radio equipment manufacturers and retailers such as RCA and programming was provided to sell the still-patented radio transmitters and receivers (thus effectively establishing a one-time fee model). Programming was financed from the sale of the equipment. Other radio stations and programs were provided as a public service through endowments or municipal financing; a few were operated by universities or public institutions for educational purposes. Some early radio stations were owned and operated by newspaper publishers. Radio gave an added forum to express the opinions of the owners and resulted in increased newspaper sales.

In effect, most early radio stations had only one sponsor: the company that owned the station. Before long, these companies began to provide their programs to independently owned radio stations, creating the first radio networks.

The radio station owners soon realized they could earn more money by selling sponsorship rights to other businesses, especially as the patents expired and most people already owned a radio. By the 1930s, it was common practice for programs to be owned and produced by the advertiser, who in turn leased production facilities and air time from the network. The advertiser frequently got top billing over the star, as in The Pepsodent Show starring Bob Hope or The Chase and Sanborn Hour starring Edgar Bergen and Charlie McCarthy. If a sponsor dropped an otherwise popular show, the network might choose to continue producing the show itself while it sought a new producer/sponsor, and in the meantime sell individual commercial slots in the show to any sponsors interested. When this happened, the network was "sustaining" the show until a new permanent sponsor took over production.

In the early days of radio broadcasting, sustaining programming included a wide variety of shows offered by radio stations and networks to attract audiences to the new medium. New programs would often go on the air on a sustaining basis in the hopes of attracting a sponsor. If a radio station and its shows became popular, then it was more likely to attract sponsors.

The War of the Worlds radio broadcast, performed Halloween of 1938, was a sustaining program. This allowed the first two-thirds of its sixty minutes to run as simulated 'newscasts' without commercial interruption.

== Network television ==
In the early 1950s, the DuMont Television Network began the modern trend of selling advertising time to multiple sponsors. DuMont had trouble finding sponsors for many of their programs and compensated by selling smaller blocks of advertising time to several businesses. The single-sponsor format began to crumble because of the quiz show scandal of 1958, while the recession which dragged through 1957-58 left it in terminal decline.

Currently, most sustaining programming on commercial television is confined to public affairs, religious, and special television news programs (and even most religious programming is now brokered instead). Sustaining programs can occasionally appear in modern times, most commonly if a program loses advertisers (such as through boycott campaigns) but contractual obligations require the program to air until the contract expires, in which case a show may be moved to a graveyard slot to free up what has become highly valuable advertising space; ad rates for new shows are now based on complicated projections based on the network's other programs, and even the rare airing of a television pilot now almost always comes with network advertising.

Outside of the United States, examples of sustaining programs that have aired on commercial television include ITV Schools (which ran on ITV and Channel 4 from 1957 to 1993) and Telecurso (which ran on TV Globo from 1978 to 2014).

== Non-commercial broadcasting ==
Non-commercial public radio stations are funded by donations and operate without radio advertising. However, many of their programs briefly acknowledge (through carefully worded underwriting spots) funding from commercial sponsors; thus, those that do not have such sponsors can be considered sustaining programs. An estimated 53% to 60% of Public Broadcasting Service (PBS) television's revenues come from private membership donations and grants, making sustaining programs viable in that sector. Most stations solicit individual donations by methods including fundraising, pledge drives or telethons which can disrupt regularly scheduled programming. Some viewers find this a source of annoyance since normal programming is often replaced with specials aimed at a wider audience to solicit new members and donations, while others find it ironic that these pledge drives air the most desirable programming in order to solicit sponsorship for regularly scheduled shows they have no desire to watch, under the ruse that the donations are supporting the pledge drive programming.
