= João Vítor Xavier =

Brazilian politician (born 1982)

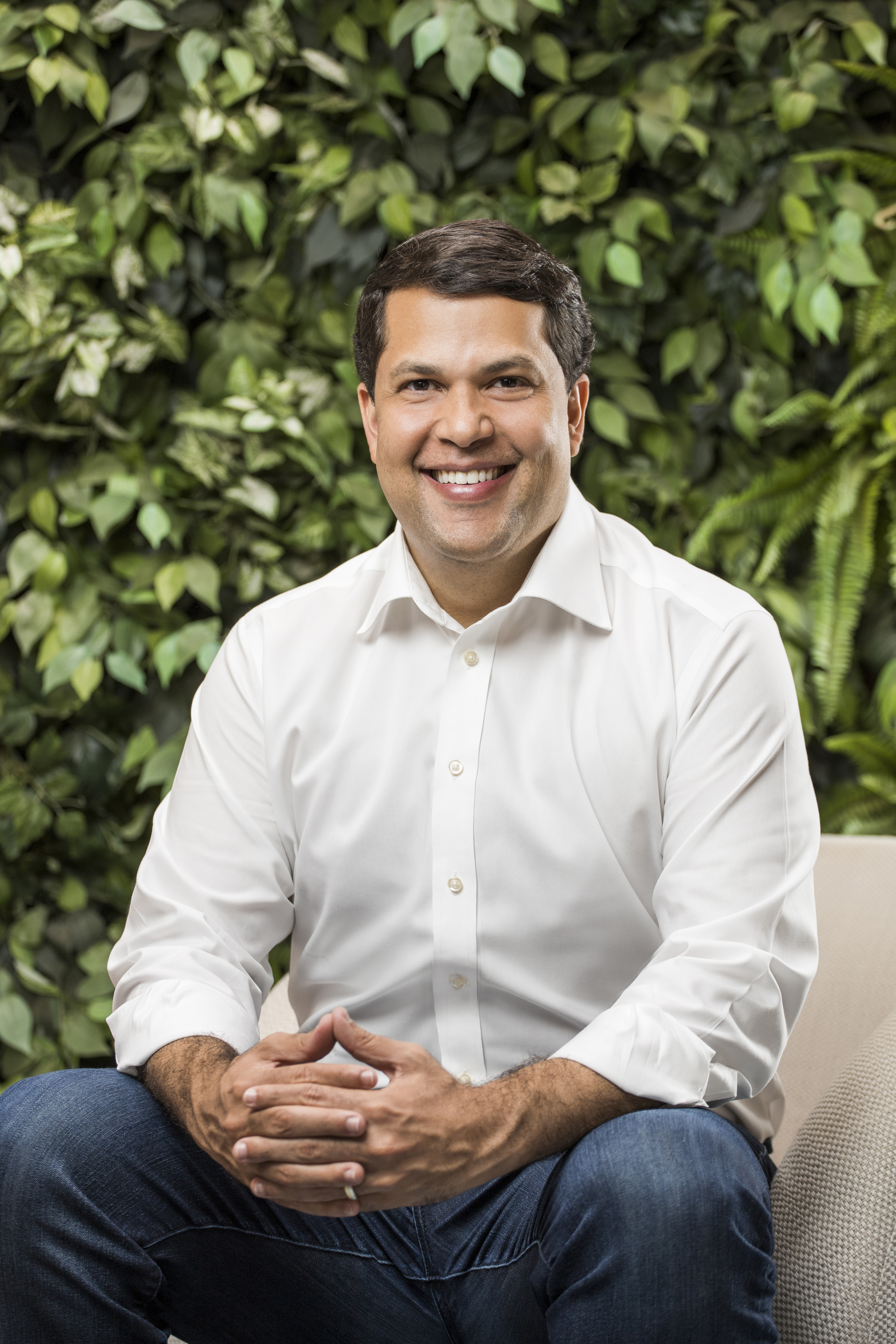
- Xavier in 2020

Member of the Legislative Assembly of Bahia
- Incumbent
- Assumed office 1 February 2011

Personal details
- Born: 24 June 1982 (age 43)
- Party: Cidadania (since 2019)

João Vítor Xavier Faustino (born 24 June 1982) is a Brazilian politician serving as a member of the Legislative Assembly of Bahia since 2011. He will take office as CEO of CNN Brasil in 2026.
