= Evaristo Costa =

Brazilian journalist

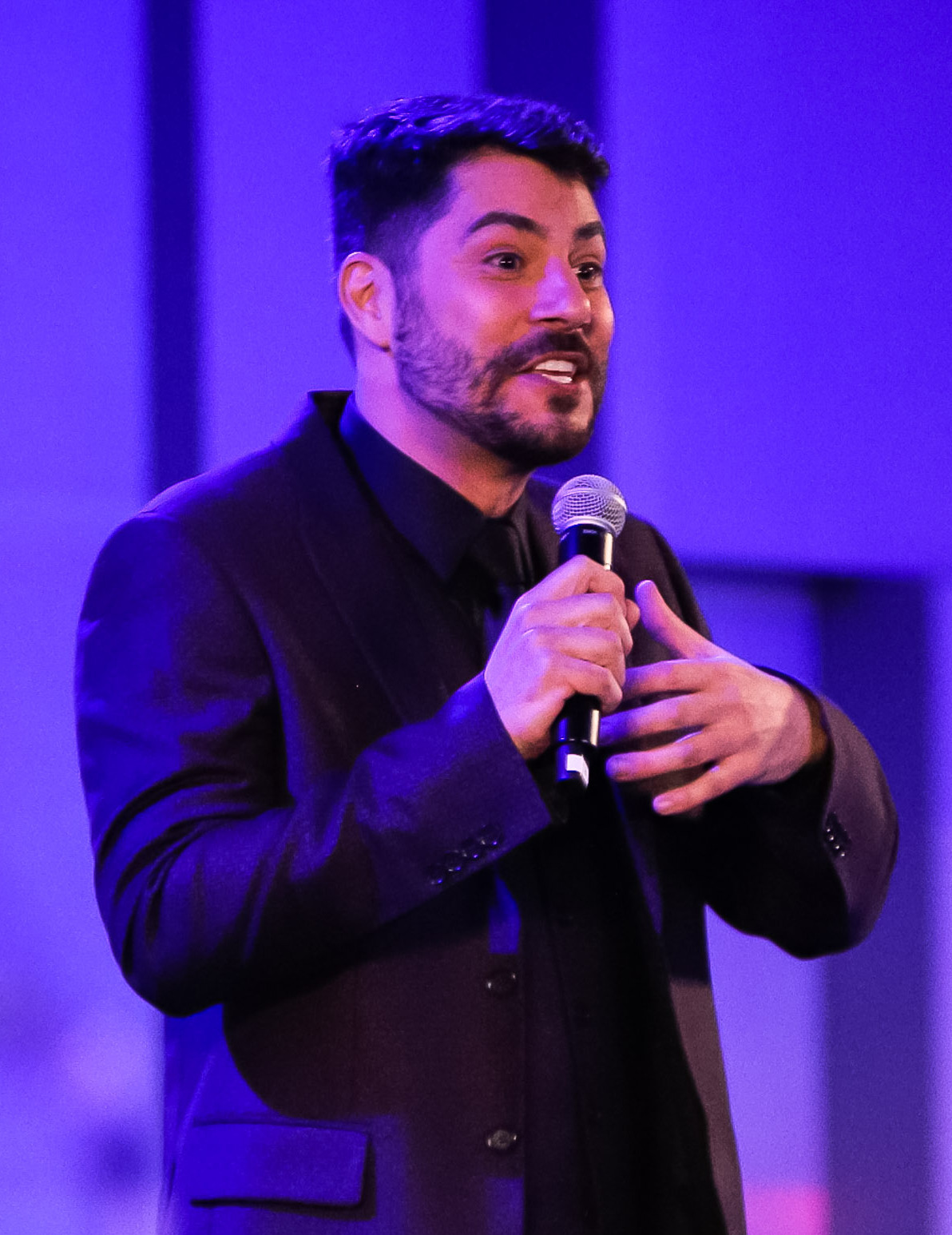
- Evaristo Costa at CNN Brazil.
- Born: Evaristo de Oliveira Costa Merigo; September 30, 1976 (age 48); São José dos Campos (SP), Brazil
- Education: Universidade Braz Cubas
- Occupation(s): Journalist and Anchor
- Years active: 1995–present
- Notable credit(s): Jornal Hoje anchor (2014–17, 2021-present); CNN Séries Originais presenter (2020–present)

Evaristo de Oliveira Costa Merigo, commonly known as Evaristo Costa (born September 30, 1976, in São José dos Campos) is a Brazilian journalist.

He graduated in Social Communication at Universidade Braz Cubas in Mogi das Cruzes. Costa started working as a journalist in 1995, when he was still in college and worked in a TV producing studio during two years, then moving to TV Vanguarda, initially as a producer and then working as reporter and presenter. In September 1999, he was transferred to TV Globo, where he was a reporter for the TV show Mais Você, hosted by Ana Maria Braga.

In 2001, Costa moved to SPTV, a São Paulo local news program. Then he presented the weather forecast of Globo Rural, SPTV, Bom Dia Brasil and Jornal Nacional until 2 February 2004, when Costa became co-host of the midday news program Jornal Hoje with Sandra Annenberg

In February 2015 Costa briefly joined the Fantástico team, replacing Tadeu Schmidt during the holidays.

At the end of 2017, he had resigned his 14-year contract from Rede Globo to move to United Kingdom, where he currently lives in Cambridge.

He is currently hired by CNN Brazil.

== Programs ==
=== At Rede Globo ===
- Jornal Hoje (2004-2017; 2021-present);
- Jornal Nacional (alternate Saturdays 2013–2017);

=== At CNN Brazil ===
- CNN Séries Originais (2020–present)

== Filmography ==
- Incredibles 2 (Brazilian voice, 2018)
