= Telecurso =

- Genre: Educational
- Created by: Francisco Calazans Fernandes
- Developed by: Rede Globo
- Directed by: Ricardo Elias
- Creative directors: Sérgio Zeigler, Thiago Faelli, Carlos R. Justino, Durval Avelino Filho and Fernando Waisberg
- Presented by: Anelis Assumpção (Joana) and César Mello (João)
- Opening theme: Instrumental
- Ending theme: Instrumental
- Composers: André Abujamra and Matias Capovilla
- Country of origin: Brazil
- Original language: Portuguese

Production
- Producers: Fundação Roberto Marinho; FIESP; CIESP; SESI-SP; SENAI-SP
- Cinematography: Eduardo Poiano and Tércio Parisi
- Editors: Rodrigo Mosca, Guga Gordilho, Caio Martins, Raquel Genioli, Edilson Magrão, Igor Peticov, Jorge Luiz Salles and Sidney Cecchini
- Camera setup: Single
- Running time: 15 minutes
- Production company: FRM – Roberto Marinho Foundation

Original release
- Network: Globo (1976–2014); Futura; TV Cultura; TV Brasil; TV Aparecida; SBT
- Release: 16 January 1978 – present

Related
- Hora Um da Notícia (Rede Globo only)

Telecurso is a television program of distance education in Brazil, made by an agreement of Padre Anchieta Foundation, Fundação Roberto Marinho and FIESP. It debuted in 1978, and was exhibited by Rede Globo until 2014. The program is still aired on Futura, TV Cultura, TV Brasil, TV Aparecida, Redevida, and SBT.

The idea of this program was created by journalist Francisco Calazans Fernandes and it featured several kinds of education classes.

== Broadcast history ==
Educational programming began to be broadcast by Rede Globo on 16 January 1978 when the secondary-school oriented Telecurso 2^{o} Grau started broadcasting; it was initially created by Rede Globo in conjunction with the Padre Anchieta Foundation (Fundação Padre Anchieta) and the Roberto Marinho Foundation. Unlike almost all other programs shown by Rede Globo, the program was presented commercial-free for its entire run due to its educational nature, although promos for the network's shows and public service announcements were still shown in between segments of the program. In 1981, Telecurso was expanded from 15 to 30 minutes with the launch of Telecurso 1^{o} Grau, which concentrated on educational lessons for elementary school children.

In 1986, the Roberto Marinho Foundation retitled the original program as Novo Telecurso 2^{o} Grau and a new partnership was obtained with Bradesco; the courses featured were authorized to become a valid form of educative material in schools around Brazil, as well as in certain companies. On 2 January 1995, the entire educational programming block was rebranded as Telecurso 2000 and expanded to 45 minutes with the launch of Telecurso 2000 Profissionalizante (which focused on vocational subjects).

On 31 March 2008, the program was reformatted as Novo Telecurso, which removed outdated segments of geography and history that were no longer being used and replaced them with philosophy, visual arts, music, theatre, sociology, and Spanish language topics that were aimed at secondary students who have not completed their education. In 2009, a new partnership was attained with SENAI-SP for the vocational segments of the program.

On 28 November 2014, Telecurso aired for the last time on Rede Globo. It was replaced by Hora Um, an early-morning news program that premiered on 1 December 2014. The daily edition of Globo Rural aired the last time on the same day; the weekly edition currently airs on Sundays at 8:00 am.

== See also ==
- Organizações Globo
- Padre Anchieta Foundation
- Rede Globo
