= Marco Antonio Villa =

Brazilian historian and author

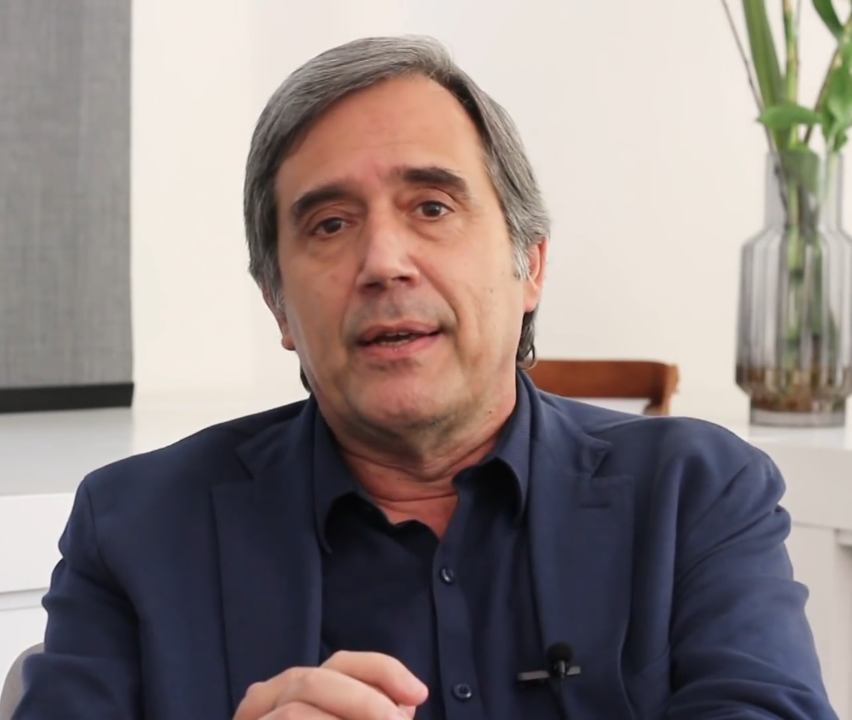
- Born: 25 May 1955 (age 71); São José do Rio Preto, São Paulo, Brazil
- Education: Pontifical Catholic University of São Paulo (dropped out); University of São Paulo (BA, MA, PhD)
- Occupations: Historian; writer; professor; commentator
- Political party: Cidadania (since 2022)
- Awards: Prêmio Literário José Celestino Bourroul

Marco Antonio Villa (May 25, 1955) is a Brazilian historian and author of several books. He writes and comments on his personal blog "Marco Antonio Villa's Blog", where he writes on many subjects, including history, economics and politics. Villa is an outspoken critic of the Workers' Party of Brazil, which he blames for the current economic crisis and poor economic growth of the country. He currently participates in the TV program Jornal da Cultura running on TV Cultura commenting on current news topics. He is a frequent commentator on current controversies in Brazil, particularly the Petrobras Scandal and Operation Car Wash (Portuguese: Operação Lava Jato).

He obtained a Master's Degree in Sociology (1989) and a Doctorate in Social History (1993) from the University of São Paulo.

== Bibliography ==
- (1995) Canudos, o povo da terra (Canudos, the people from the land)
- (2000) Vida e morte no sertão. História das secas no Nordeste nos séculos XIX e XX (Life and Death in the Countrywide. History of the droughts in the Brazilian Northeast in the 19th and 20th Centuries)
- (2009) O Partido dos Trabalhadores e a política brasileira (The Workers' Party and Brazilian Politics)
- (2013) Década perdida, dez anos do Partido dos Trabalhadores no governo (The Lost Decade, ten years of the Worker's Party in government)
- (2016) Collor presidente. Trinta meses de turbulências, reformas, intrigas e corrupção (Collor President, Thirty months of turmoil, reforms, intrigue and corruption)
