= Paulo Saldiva =

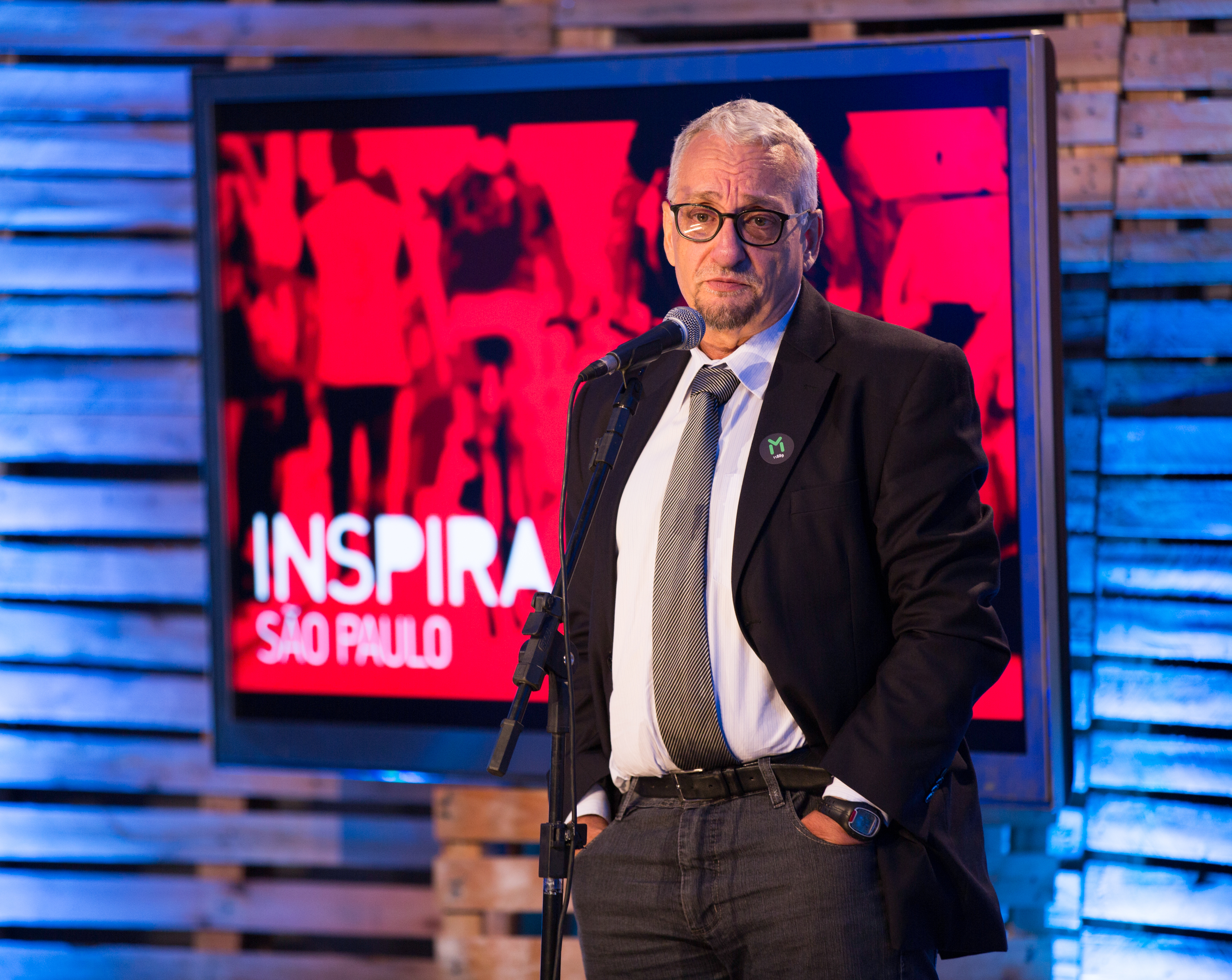
- Portrait of Paulo Saldiva

Personal details
- Born: Paulo Hilário Nascimento Saldiva; July 12, 1954 (age 72)
- Education: University of Sao Paulo

Paulo Hilário Nascimento Saldiva (12 July 1954) is a Brazilian professor, physician, pathologist and medical researcher. He researches particularly on the academic area of pathophysiology of the lungs and the hazardous consequences of air pollution for human health. He is a member of the World Health Organization and is a researcher of the Department of Environmental Health of Harvard University, and has co-authored the book "Saúde e Meio Ambiente: o desafio das metrópoles" (Health and the Environment : the challenge faced by the metropolis), released in 2011. Saldiva graduated and obtained a bachelor's degree by the department of Medicine of the Universidade de São Paulo in 1977 and a Doctor's Degree in Pathology in 1983, among other academic accomplishments. He participates weekly in the TV program Jornal da Cultura.
