= Monalisa Perrone =

Brazilian journalist

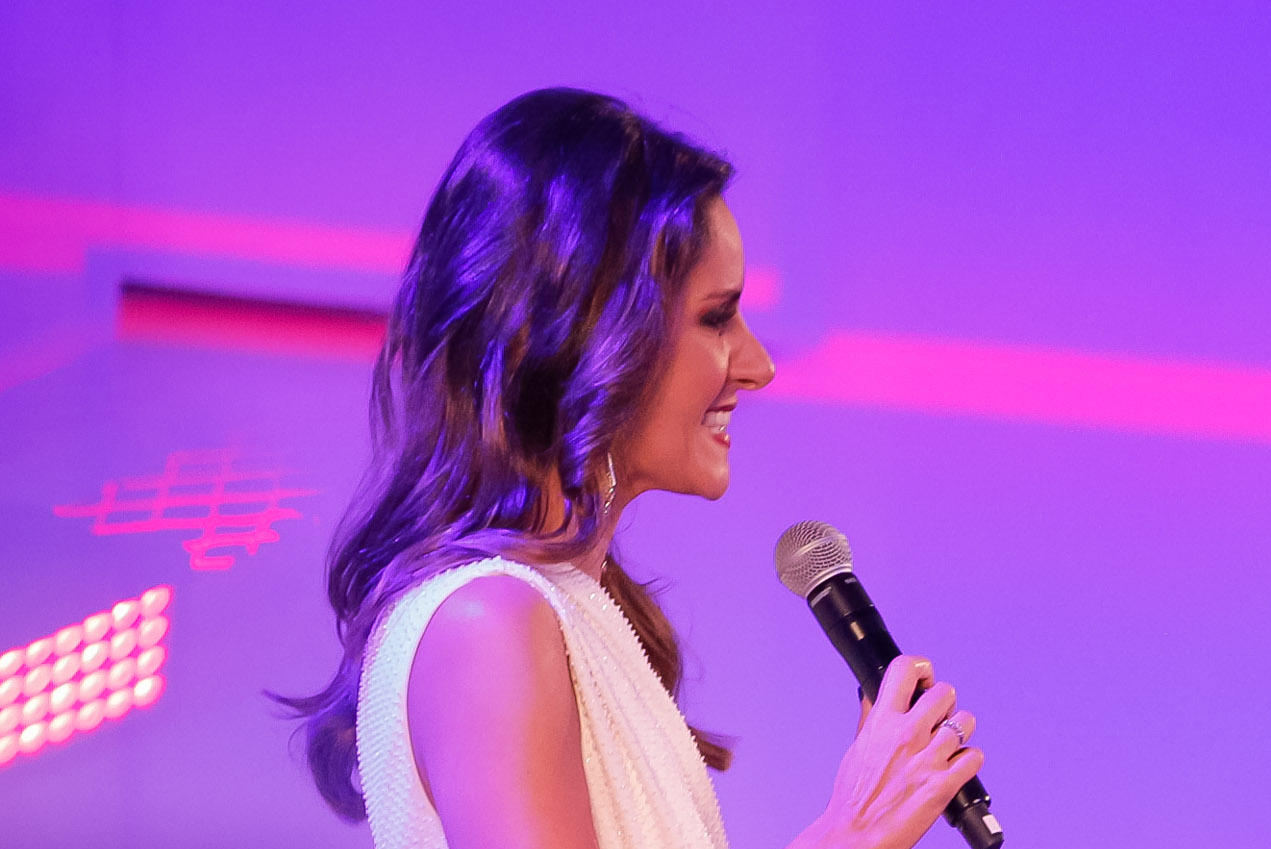
- Monalisa Perrone in 2020
- Born: Monalisa Gomes Perrone; 12 November 1969 (age 56); São Paulo, Brazil
- Occupations: Journalist; news anchor
- Years active: 1992–present
- Notable credit(s): Hora Um da Notícia anchor (2014–2019)
- Spouse: Paulo Gaba Júnior (m. 1992; div. 2013)

Monalisa Gomes Perrone (born 12 November 1969) is a Brazilian journalist. She is a former reporter and presenter for TV Globo and CNN Brazil.

== Biography ==
Monalisa graduated from the Pontifícia Universidade Católica de São Paulo. Their parents were high school teachers. During her studies, she worked as a clerk in a rental car company to pay for her college tuition. She began working for radio Jovem Pan in 1992. After three years at that radio network, Monalisa joined Radio Bandeirantes as a reporter. Since March 1999, she works for Globo where she has been working as operations manager and as a journalist.

Between 4 January and 16 March 2010, Monalisa was the temporary presenter of Bom Dia São Paulo, as its main anchor, Mariana Godoy, was on vacation. At that same year she received the award for Best Female Press reporter in Brazil. She was married, now divorced since 2014, and has 3 daughters. On October 31, 2011, in a live link that made the Jornal Hoje, she was pushed by members of Merd TV group, which are anti-Globo, what made the station to change their reporting rules of working.

In 2014, she hosted the parades of samba schools of São Paulo and at the end of this year, Monalisa become the first presenter of the new TV news live program Hora Um da Notícia on Rede Globo, which is aired at 5:00am brasilia time ever since.

On 3 August 2019, Perrone left Rede Globo to accept "an irrefusable offer" made by CNN Brazil.

== TV news ==
- Hora Um da Notícia (2014 - 2019)
- Expresso CNN (2020 - 2022)
- Jornal da CNN (2022)

=== Presenter eventual ===
- SPTV (2004 – 2014);
- Bom Dia São Paulo and Bom Dia Brasil (2006 – 2014);
- Jornal Hoje: Sala de Emprego (2012 – 2014)
- Jornal Hoje (2015 - 2016)
- Jornal Nacional (2016 - 2019)
