= Luiz Flávio Gomes =

Brazilian jurist and politician (1957–2020)

Luiz Flávio Gomes (6 May 1957 – 1 April 2020) was a Brazilian jurist, professor and politician born in Sud Mennucci, São Paulo. As a member of the Socialist Party (PSB), he started his term in the Chamber of Deputies in February 2019, and died in office in 2020. He published more than 60 books, including O Jogo Sujo da Corrupção (2017). He founded Rede LFG and was a commentator on TV Cultura program Jornal da Cultura.

In September 2019, Gomes was diagnosed with acute myeloid leukaemia. He died on 1 April 2020 at a São Paulo hospital from complications from the disease. He was 62.
