= Ricardo Abramovay =

Brazilian sociologist

Ricardo Abramovay (1953) is a Brazilian sociologist, political scientist and university professor.

== Biography ==
Ricardo Abramovay was born in 1953. He graduated in Philosophy at Université de Paris X, France, in 1974. He obtained his master's degree in Political Science at the University of São Paulo and a PhD in Sociology at University of Campinas. Abramovay obtained the prize of Best Thesis by Brazilian Association of Graduate Programs and Research in Social Sciences (Anpocs) in 1991.

During the 1990s, Abramovay completed his studies as Postdoctoral researcher in France. He studied sociology of agriculture at the Centre International de Recherches Agronomiques pour le Développement (CIRAD), at the École des Hautes Études en Sciences Sociales and Université de Versailles Saint-Quentin-en-Yvelines.

In 1995, Abramovay did a two-year study program at the Foundation Nationale des Sciences Politiques and worked with Ignacy Sachs in a research about the role of rural areas and agriculture for the process of development.

He was lecturer for more than 30 years in School of Economics, Business and Accounting of the University of São Paulo. He advocates for an economic school of thought that brings together ethics, environmental preservation, and society.

== Peasantry and agrarian capitalism ==
Abramovay defended his PhD thesis ("Paradigms of agrarian capitalism in question") in 1991. The thesis received the "Best Doctoral Thesis" Award from the VII University Thesis and Scientific Works Competition in 1991, promoted by the National Association of Graduate Programs and Research in Social Sciences (Anpocs). Abramovay maintains that it is around the family establishment that agriculture is socially structured in advanced countries. Both in economically developed nations of recent colonization (USA and Canada), and in others with secular peasant traditions (Continental Europe) an atomized sector operates in millions of productive agricultural units orchestrated by the planning, command and control of the State and professional organizations. Abramovay says: "Despite its individual base, it is difficult to imagine a more socialized economic activity". After realizing that there is no theory of the agrarian question in Karl Marx and questioning the stated Marxist paradigm, the author presents scholars who deal with the "functioning of this particular organism, which is the peasant unit". The existence of the "peasantry" presupposes a set of social ties given by tradition, by the community, by personalized relations of dependence and equality, and incomplete and partial integration in the market. Based on economic sociology, Abramovay argues that "where capitalism is implanted, where the market begins to dominate social life, where economic rationality takes over the behavior of individuals, community ties end up losing their aggregating power and peasants see the objective bases of their own social reproduction vanish".

== Sociology of markets ==
In the 1990s, Abramovay refined the field of rural sociology with research on sustainable agriculture, the “social capital of the territories” and the social construction of alternative agricultural markets based on an analysis of social networks and relationships. In the 2000s, Abramovay's studies moved between forms of market organization, the role of civil society in local development, the emergence of an environmental responsibility discourse in the corporate environment and the need for a methodological break to understand the markets in their social dimension.

According to Abramovay, the main feature of the new economic sociology is to study markets not as abstract mechanisms of balance, but as social constructions. For Abramovay, markets came to be seen as forms of social coordination characterized by conflicts, dependencies, structures and unpredictabilities that are very distant from the canonical image enshrined in Walras' general equilibrium theory. Contemporary economic sociology has the characteristic of conceiving markets as results of specific, rooted, socially determined forms of social interaction, and not as premises whose study can be done in a strictly deductive way. Departing from Stefano Zamagni, Abramovay argues that markets can be seen as real and living social relationships. Market relations assume the permanent attempt to seek recognition by the other and, therefore, involve, to some degree, reciprocity in that recognition.

As professor of economic sociology at the University of São Paulo, Abramovay has been responsible for disseminating the works of Harrison White, Mark Granovetter, Richard Swedberg and thinkers in the tradition of Karl Polanyi.

== Digital economy and data ethics ==
Since 2015, Ricardo Abramovay's publications have focused on the impacts of digital transformation for the economy and society. In "hybrid economy of the 21st century", Abramovay argues that the Internet economy provides a reinvention of productive arrangements, coupled with a knowledge economy, making specific configurations for these new markets.

In 2018, Ricardo Abramovay founded the Center for Ethics, Technology and Digital Economies at the Institute of Energy and Environment of the University of São Paulo. The Nucleus is composed of students from different disciplines.

In 2019, Ricardo Abramovay published two essays with activist and lawyer Rafael Zanatta. In "Data, addictions and competition", published in Advanced Studies, Abramovay analyzes the interrelationship between platform design, retaining users' attention and maximizing the extraction of value by their personal data. Abramovay and Zanatta argue that discussions about orchestrating economic behavior and discriminating prices by profiles can generate a renewed antitrust agenda. In "Open personal data", Abramovay and Zanatta analyze the work of thinkers like Roberto Mangabeira Unger and Jaron Lanier and propose data sharing arrangements in digital markets, conceptualizing personal data as a common good and shared economic asset to promote economic democracy.

== Selected works ==
- Author of "Far Beyond the Green Economy" ("Muito Além da Economia Verde")(Ed. Sustainable Planet, SP, 2012) ISBN 978-1138938861 (English edition)
- Co-author of "Zero Waste: Solid Waste Management for a More Prosperous Society" ("Lixo Zero: Gestão de Resíduos Sólidos para uma Sociedade Mais Próspera")
- "Most widely held works by Ricardo Abramovay". WorldCat.
