= Fábio Bala =

Brazilian footballer (born 1981)

Personal information
- Full name: Fábio Pereira de Oliveira
- Date of birth: September 30, 1981 (age 45)
- Place of birth: Manaus, Brazil
- Height: 1.72 m (5 ft 8 in)
- Position: Striker

Team information
- Current team: Morrinhos

Senior career*
Years	Team	Apps	(Gls)
2001–2005	Fluminense	17	(2)
2005	→ Grêmio (loan)	9	(1)
2006–2007	Avaí	25	(4)
2007–2008	Fluminense		
2008	Democrata		
2008	Sampaio Corrêa		
2009	Volta Redonda		
2009–2010	América Mineiro	9	(1)
2011–	Morrinhos		
- * Club domestic league appearances and goals as of 28 November 2008

Fábio Pereira de Oliveira (born 30 September 1981 in Manaus), more commonly known as Fábio Bala, is a professional Brazilian footballer.

== Honours ==
=== Club ===
- Fluminense

Campeonato Carioca 2002

- Grêmio

Campeonato Brasileiro Série B 2005

=== Individual ===
- Fluminense

Campeonato Carioca 2003 Top Goalscorer (10 goals)
