= Luiz Felipe Pondé =

Brazilian philosopher and writer (born 1959)

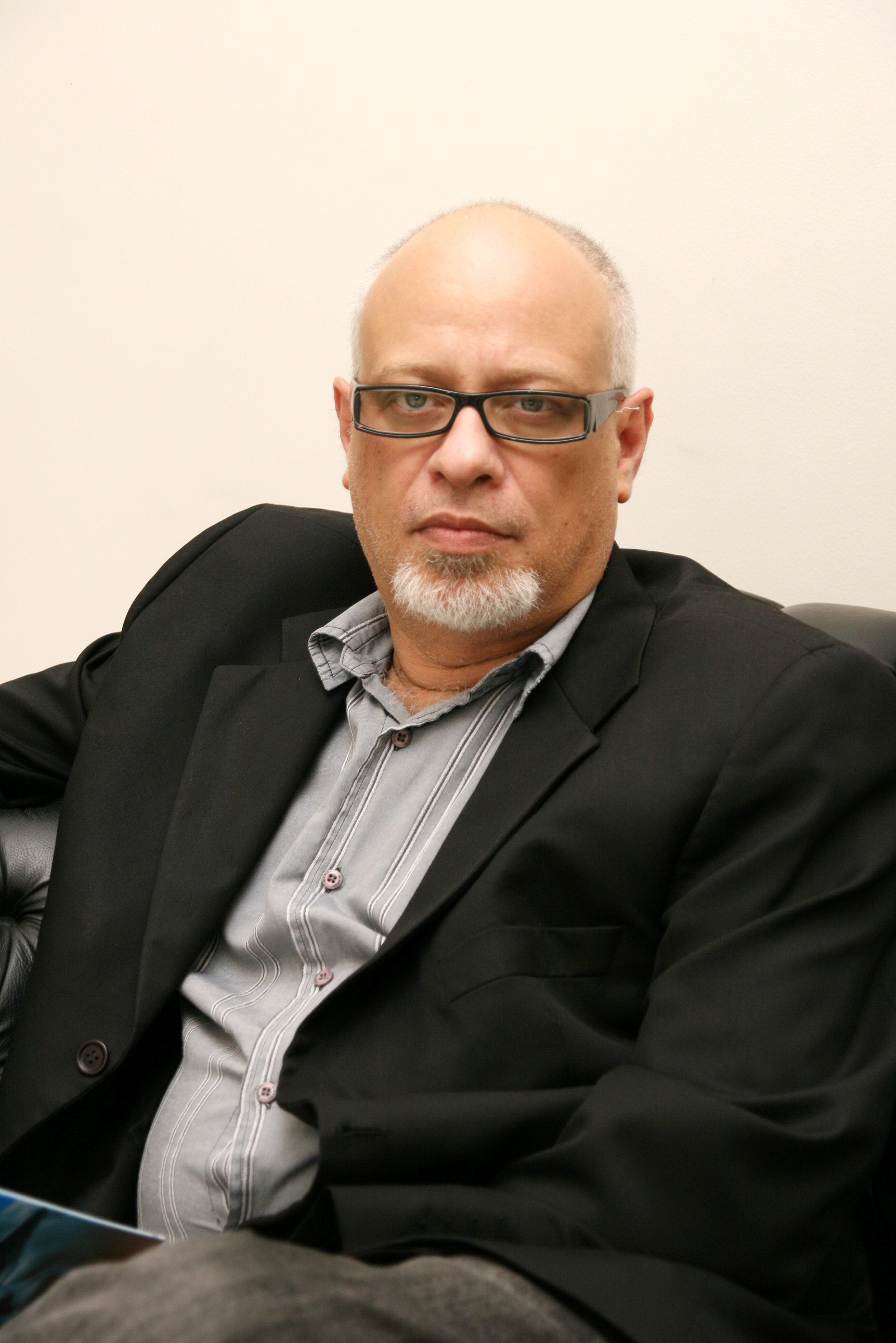
- Born: Recife, Pernambuco, Brazil

Education
- Education: University of São Paulo, University of Paris, University of Tel Aviv

Philosophical work
- Era: 21st-century philosophy
- Region: Western philosophy
- School: Liberal conservatism
- Main interests: Philosophy, essays

Luiz Felipe de Cerqueira e Silva Pondé (born April 29, 1959) is a Brazilian writer and professor of philosophy.

He graduated with a Bachelor of Arts in philosophy. He was awarded a Doctor's Degree by the University of São Paulo, together with an exchange program with the University of Paris. He finished his Post-Doctorate at the University of Tel Aviv. Currently, he works as a professor in the Brazilian Educational Institution Fundação Armando Alvares Penteado and Pontifícia Universidade Católica de São Paulo.

He writes weekly for the Brazilian Newspaper Folha de S.Paulo and is the author of many works, being most famous for his book, "The Politically Incorrect Guide of Philosophy". He appears often on Jornal da Cultura, on TV Cultura.

Being of Sephardic Jewish descent, in a 2013 YouTube video, Pondé declared himself to be atheist but he would later abandon his views and become a critic of atheism and materialism. In 2020, he described himself as a "non-practicing atheist".

== Bibliography ==
- O homem insuficiente: Comentários de Psicologia Pascaliana (2001)
- Conhecimento na desgraça: Ensaio da Epistemologia Pascaliana (2004)
- Crítica e profecia: filosofia da religião em Dostoiévski (Critic and Prophecy: Philosophy of Religion in Dostoievski) (2003)
- Do pensamento no deserto: Ensaio de Filosofia, Teologia e Literatura (The thought in the desert: An Essay on Philosophy, Theology and Literature) (2009)
- Contra um mundo melhor: Ensaios do Afeto (2010), O Catolicismo Hoje (2011)
- Guia Politicamente Incorreto da Filosofia (The Politically Incorrect Guide of Philosophy") (2012).
- A filosofia da adúltera - Ensaios Selvagens (The Philosophy of the Adulteress - Wild Essays) (2013)
- A era do ressentimento: uma agenda para o contemporâneo (The era of resentment: an agenda for the contemporary) (2014)
- Os Dez Mandamentos (+ Um) (The Ten Commandments (+ One)) (2015)
- Filosofia para Corajosos (Philosophy for the Brave) (2016)
- Marketing Existencial (Existential Marketing) (2017)
- Amor para Corajosos (Love for the brave) (2017)

He has also co-authored other books with notable Brazilian figures.
