= Fábio Oliveira (footballer, born 1981) =

Association football player

Personal information
- Full name: Fábio de Jesus Oliveira
- Date of birth: 30 March 1981 (age 45)
- Place of birth: Ipatinga, Minas Gerais, Brazil
- Height: 1.77 m (5 ft 10 in)
- Position: Midfielder

Youth career
- 1998–2000: Videira

Senior career*
| Years | Team | Apps | (Gls) |
| 2000–2002 | Avaí | | |
| 2003–2005 | Chapecoense | | |
| 2005–2006 | Al Oruba Sur | | |
| 2006 | CTE Colatina | 0 | (0) |
| 2007–2009 | Cianorte | 0 | (0) |
| 2008 | → Oeste (loan) | 0 | (0) |
| 2008 | → TCW (loan) | 5 | (0) |
| 2008–2009 | → Botafogo-SP (loan) | 0 | (0) |
| 2009–2010 | Linense | 0 | (0) |
| 2010 | Sorocaba | 0 | (0) |
| 2010 | América-RN | 8 | (0) |
| 2011 | Treze | 9 | (0) |
| 2012–2013 | Esportivo-RS | 0 | (0) |
| 2013 | Águia de Marabá | 2 | (0) |

International career^{‡}
| 2003 | Togo | 3 | (0) |
- * Club domestic league appearances and goals as of 22:15, May 8, 2009 (UTC) ‡ National team caps and goals as of 22:15, May 8, 2009 (UTC)

Fábio de Jesus Oliveira (born 30 March 1981), known as Fábio Oliveira, is a former footballer who played as a midfielder. Born and raised in Brazil, he has been naturalized by Togo and played for that national team.

== Biography ==
Fábio Oliveira was born in Ipatinga, a municipality located in eastern Minas Gerais state, Brazil.

He was signed by the Omani side Al Oruba Sur in July 2005, and returned to Brazil for CTE Colatina in February 2006.

He signed a three-year contract for Cianorte in January 2007. He was loaned to Oeste in March 2008 until June 2008. In June, he was signed by Toledo Colônia Work and in August signed by Botafogo-SP in 1-year loan. In June 2009 he was signed by Linense in 1-year contract and in February 2010 signed by Sorocaba. In July, he was signed by América-RN and in January 2011 signed a 1-year contract with Treze.

== International career ==
Fábio Oliveira and other Brazilian-born players played for the Togo national team in June and July 2003 in a 2004 African Cup of Nations Qualifying matches against Cape Verde, Kenya and Mauritania. Fábio Oliveira "remember that [he] played against Cape Verde and Mauritania". He also played for Togo against the Ghanaian club Asante Kotoko in a friendly match on June 29, 2003 in Stade de Kégué, Lomé.
