= Leandro Karnal =

Brazilian TV personality, former university professor

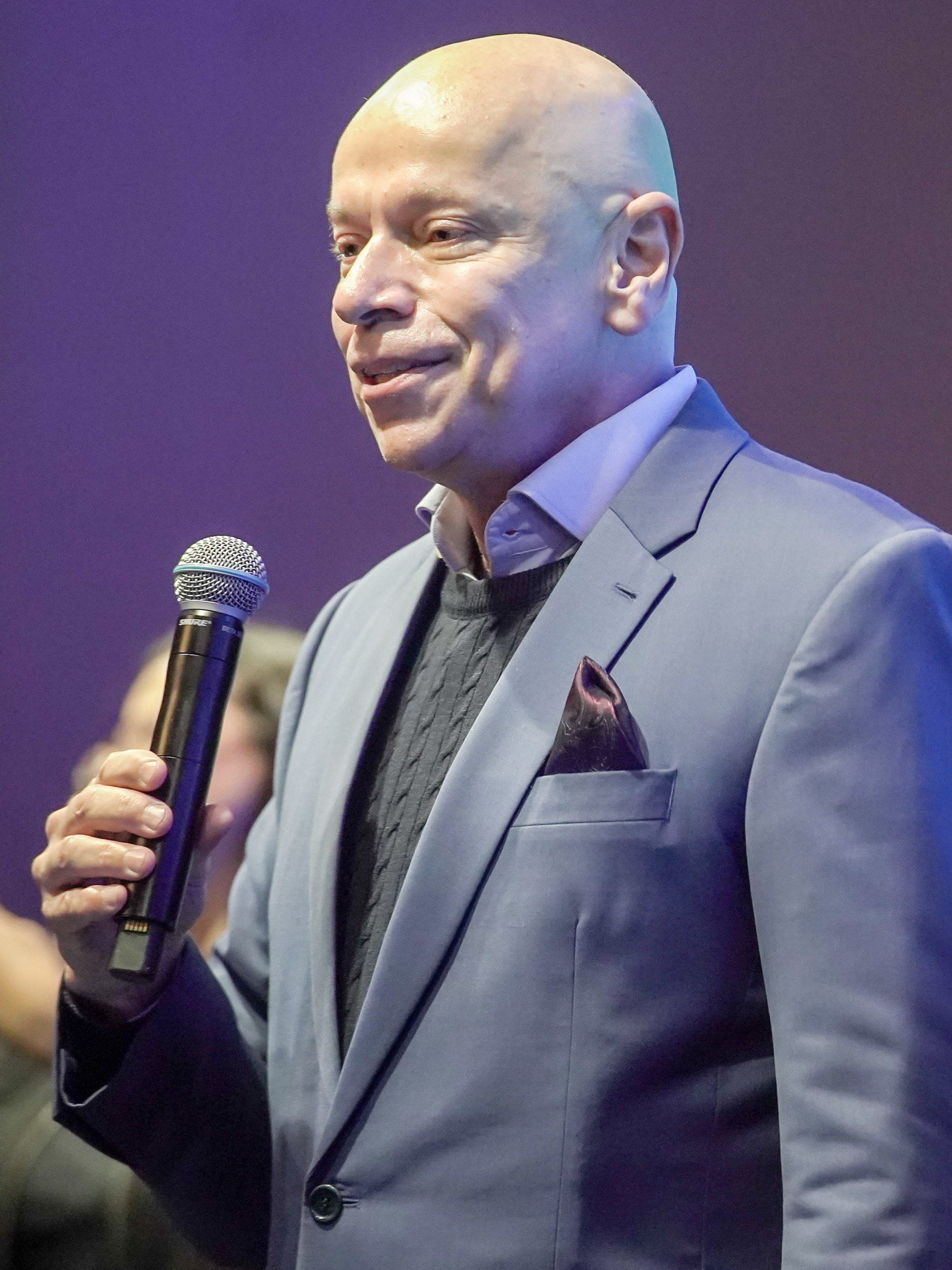
- Born: 1 February 1963 (age 63)
- Citizenship: Brazil
- Education: University of São Paulo (USP)
- Alma mater: University of São Paulo (USP) Ph.D., Universidade do Vale do Rio dos Sinos (Unisinos) B.Sc.
- Spouse: Vitor Fadul (m. 2019)
- Scientific career
- Fields: History Ethics
- Institutions: University of Campinas (Unicamp)
- Thesis: Teatro da Fé: Representação Religiosa no Brasil e no México do Século XVI (in Portuguese) (1994)
- Doctoral advisor: Janice Theodoro da Silva

Leandro Karnal (born 1 February 1963) is a Brazilian television personality and former university professor at the Universidade Estadual de Campinas until 2019. Karnal has publications on the subject of History, focusing on the History of the Americas and the History of Religion. He was born in São Leopoldo, and became known in Brazil for his work on popularizing philosophy for the masses; he lectures around the country. In 2020, he became co-host of CNN Tonight, a nightly commentary program at CNN Brasil.

== Bibliography ==
- Oriente Médio (1996)
- A conquista do México (1998)
- Quando Anchieta chegou ao Brasil (1998)
- Teatro da Fé - representação religiosa no Brasil e no México do século XVI (1998)
- A Guerra Fria (2001)
- Estados Unidos: A formação da nação (2001)
- História na sala de aula: Conceitos, práticas e propostas (2003)
- História dos Estados Unidos: das origens ao século XXI (2007) — coauthors: Luís Estevam Fernandes, Marcus Vinicius de Morais, Sean Purdy
- O historiador e suas fontes (2009) — various authors
- Conversas com um jovem professor (2012)
- Pecar e perdoar: Deus e o homem na história (2014)
- As religiões que o mundo esqueceu: Como os egípcios, gregos, celtas, astecas e outros povos cultuavam seus deuses (2015)
- A detração: Breve ensaio sobre o maldizer (2016)
- Felicidade ou morte (2016) — coauthor: Clóvis de Barros Filho
- Verdade e mentiras: Ética e democracia no Brasil (2016) — coauthors: Gilberto Dimenstein, Luiz Felipe Pondé | Mario Sergio Cortella
