= Rubens Menin =

Brazilian billionaire and founder of MRV Engenharia

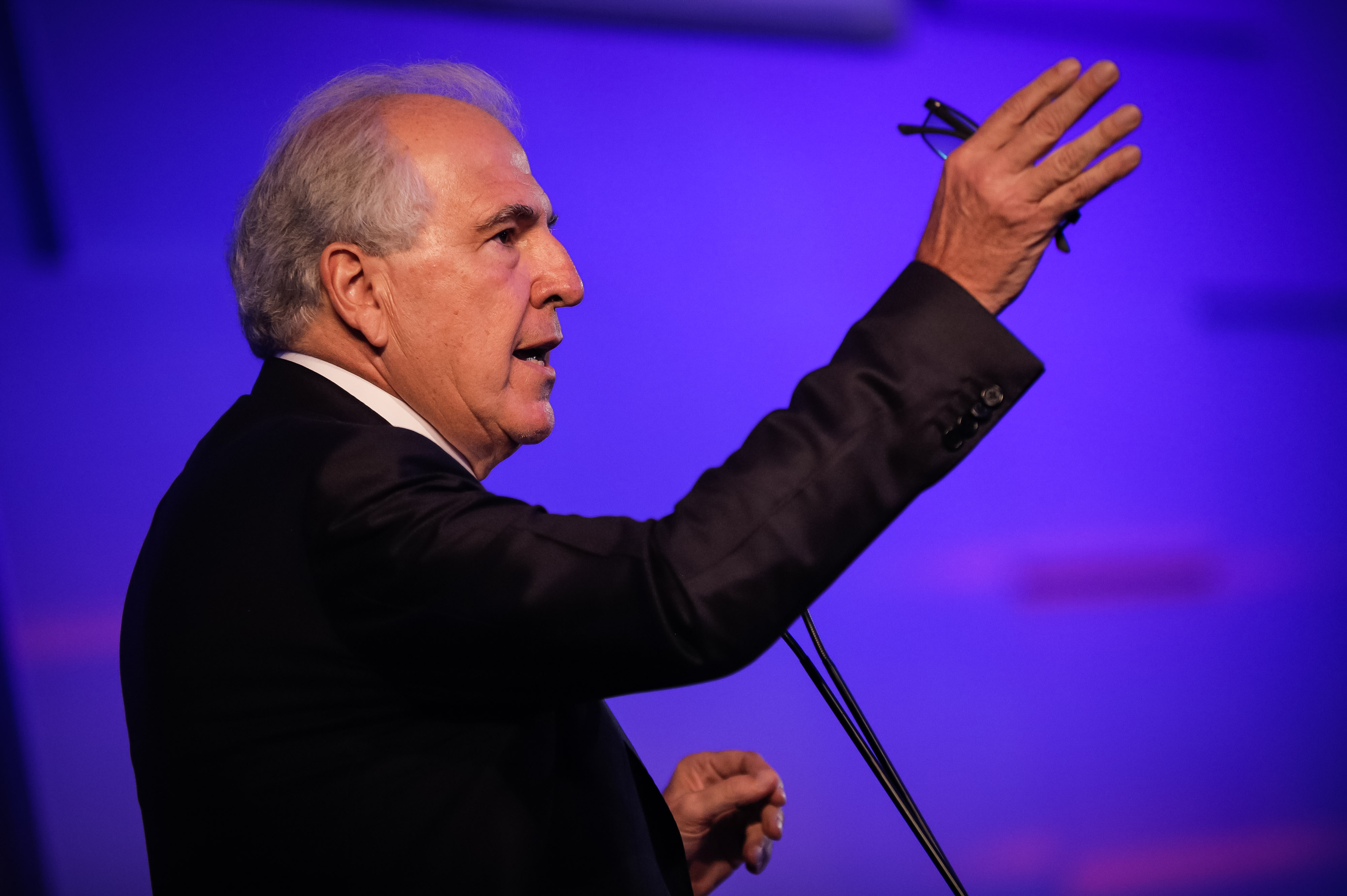
- Born: Rubens Menin Teixeira de Souza; 12 March 1956 (age 70); Belo Horizonte, Minas Gerais, Brazil
- Education: Universidade Federal de Minas Gerais
- Occupation: Businessman
- Known for: Co-founder, chairman and CEO, MRV Engenharia
- Children: 3

Rubens Menin Teixeira de Souza (born 12 March 1956) is a Brazilian billionaire businessman and a co-founder of MRV Engenharia, a Brazilian homebuilding and real estate development company founded in 1979. The company has a market capitalization of about $1.4 billion. As of 2025, his net worth is estimated at US$2.2 billion.

== Education ==
He has a bachelor's degree in civil engineering from the Federal University of Minas Gerais, where he graduated in 1978.

== Business ==
Menin has served as chairman of MRV Engenharia since 2007 and is the company’s majority shareholder. MRV has faced legal controversies related to environmental issues.

In June 2018, Menin was named the Ernst & Young World Entrepreneur of the Year.

In May 2021, Menin announced that he had acquired full ownership of the broadcasting company Rádio Itatiaia.

== Personal life ==
He is married, with three children, and lives in Belo Horizonte, Brazil.
