= MRV Engenharia =

Brazilian real estate company

MRV Engenharia e Participações S.A.
- Type: Sociedade Anônima
- Traded as: B3: MRVE3; Ibovespa Component
- Industry: Construction & Real Estate
- Founded: 1979; 47 years ago
- Headquarters: Belo Horizonte, Brazil
- Key people: Rafael Nazareth Menin Teixeira, (co-CEO) Eduardo Fischer Teixeira de Souza (co-CEO) Rubens Menin Teixeira de Souza, (Chairman)
- Products: House-building
- Revenue: ▲US$ 1.3 billion (2018)
- Net income: ▲US$ 178.2 million (2018)
- Number of employees: 5,706
- Website: www.mrv.com.br

MRV is the biggest Brazilian homebuilder and real estate company. The company was founded in 1979 by Mário Lúcio Pinheiro Menin, Rubens Menin Teixeira de Souza and Vega Engenharia Ltda and is headquartered in Belo Horizonte. The company's major shareholder is Brazilian entrepreneur Rubens Menin Teixeira de Souza.

MRV is the biggest homebuilder company in Brazil by revenue.
