= Cláudia Costin =

Brazilian academic and civil servant

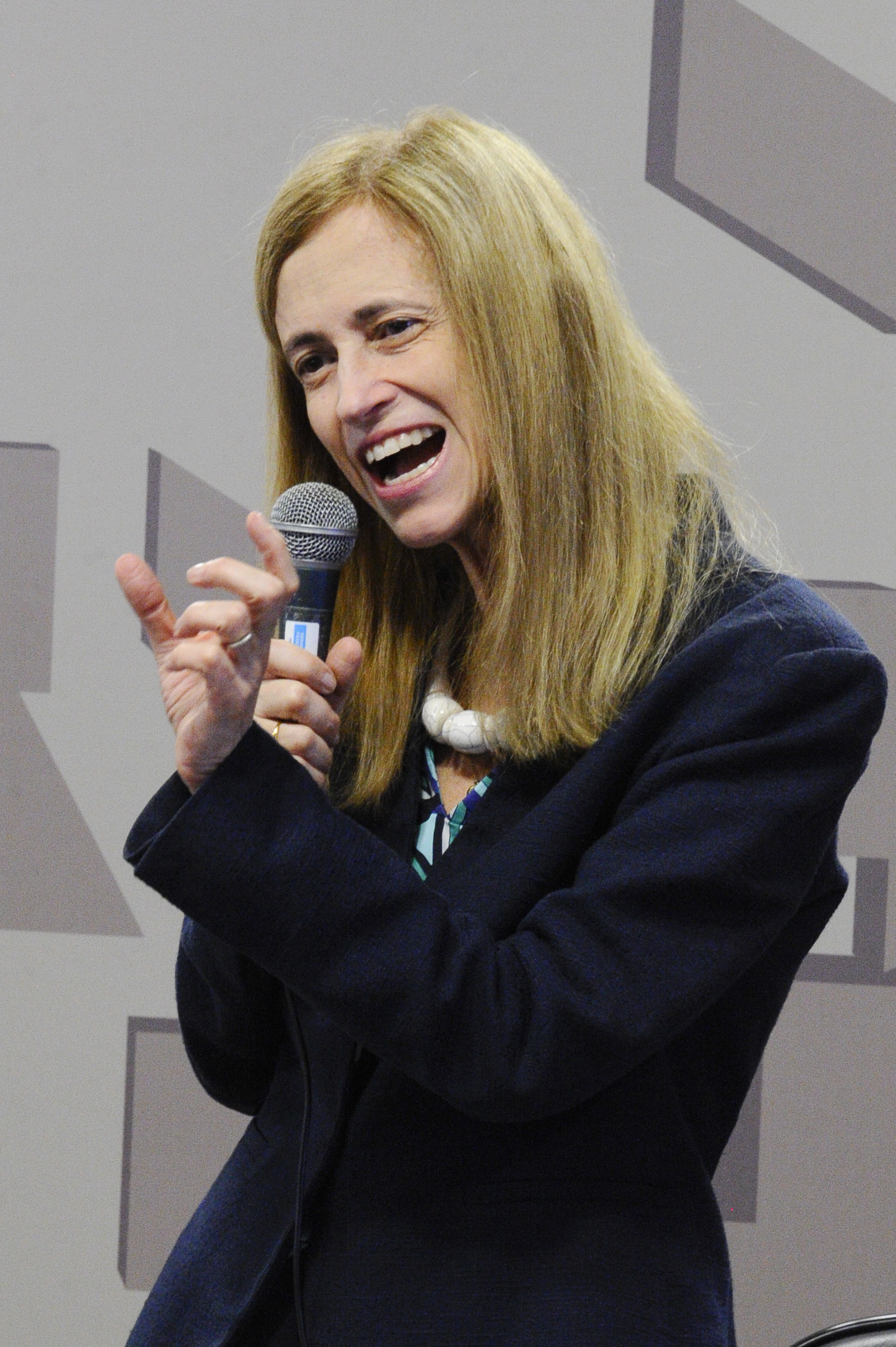
- Cláudia Costin in June 2018.

Cláudia Maria Costin (born January 24, 1956) is a Brazilian academic and civil servant.

The daughter of Maurício and Lídia Costin, she was born in São Paulo. She is of Romanian descent. Costin studied public administration at the Escola de Administração de Empresas de São Paulo (Eaesp) and, in 1986, received a master's degree in economics from the same institution. While a student, she was active in the Partido Comunista do Brasil and was arrested twice. She was a co-founder of the Partido Revolucionário Comunista.

Costin has served on the faculty of the Pontifical Catholic University of São Paulo, the Insper institution, the École nationale d'administration publique in Quebec, the Harvard Graduate School of Education and Eaesp.

From 2009 to 2014, she was secretary of education for Rio de Janeiro. From 2014 to 2016, Costin was senior director of education at the World Bank Group. She has been vice-president for the Fundação Victor Civita and executive secretary for the Helio Beltrao Institute. She helped establish the Todos pela Educação and served on its technical committee. Costin also served as Secretary of Culture for São Paulo state and federal Minister of Public Administration and State Reform.

In 2017, she was named to the Brazilian Ordem do Mérito Cultural.
