= Colinas do Tocantins =

Municipality in Tocantins, Brazil

- Municipality
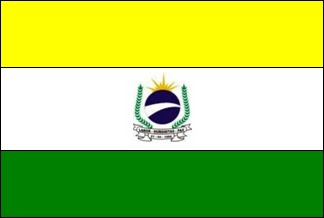
- Flag Coat of arms

- Location in Tocantins state

- Location in Brazil
- Coordinates: 08°03′32″S 48°28′30″W
- Country: Brazil
- Region: North
- State: Tocantins

Area
  - Total: 844 km^{2} (326 sq mi)

Population (2020)
  - Total: 35,851
  - Density: 42.5/km^{2} (110/sq mi)
- Time zone: UTC−3 (BRT)

Colinas do Tocantins is a municipality located in the Brazilian state of Tocantins. Its population was 35,851 as of 2020 and its area is 844 km^{2}.

== See also ==
- List of municipalities in Tocantins
