= 2025 Esporte Clube Bahia season =

Esporte Clube Bahia
2025 season
- President: Emerson Ferretti
- Manager: Rogério Ceni
- Stadium: Arena Fonte Nova
- Série A: 7th
- Campeonato Baiano: Champions (51st title)
- Copa do Nordeste: Champions (5th title)
- Copa do Brasil: Quarter-finals
- Copa Libertadores: Group stage
- Copa Sudamericana: Knockout round play-offs
- Average home league attendance: 38,098
Home colours	Away colours

The 2025 season was Esporte Clube Bahia’s 94th overall and 3rd consecutive in Brazil's top division. The club also participated in the Campeonato Baiano, Copa do Brasil, and Copa Libertadores.

== Kits ==
Home	Home alt. 1	Home alt. 2	Away	Away alt.	Superman

== Squad ==
=== First team ===
As of 5 February 2025

Note: Flags indicate national team as defined under FIFA eligibility rules; some limited exceptions apply. Players may hold more than one non-FIFA nationality.

No.	Pos.	Nation	Player
1	GK	BRA	Danilo Fernandes
2	DF	BRA	Gilberto
3	DF	BRA	Gabriel Xavier
4	DF	BRA	Kanu
5	MF	BRA	Rezende
6	MF	BRA	Jean Lucas
7	FW	BRA	Ademir
8	MF	BRA	Cauly
9	FW	BRA	Everaldo
10	MF	BRA	Éverton Ribeiro (captain)
12	FW	BRA	Willian José
13	DF	COL	Santiago Arias
14	MF	BRA	Erick
15	MF	URU	Michel Araújo
16	FW	BRA	Erick Pulga
17	FW	URU	Luciano Rodríguez

No.	Pos.	Nation	Player
19	MF	BRA	Caio Alexandre
20	MF	BRA	Yago Felipe
21	DF	ARG	Santiago Ramos Mingo
22	GK	BRA	Marcos Felipe
23	MF	BRA	Rodrigo Nestor (on loan from São Paulo)
25	DF	BRA	Iago Borduchi
26	MF	URU	Nicolás Acevedo
31	DF	BRA	Vitor Hugo
33	DF	BRA	David Duarte
37	FW	BRA	Kayky (on loan from Manchester City)
41	GK	BRA	Denis Júnior
44	DF	BRA	Marcos Victor
46	DF	BRA	Luciano Juba
71	DF	BRA	Kauã Davi
—	GK	BRA	Gabriel Souza

=== Transfers In ===
Pos.	Player	Transferred from	Fee	Date	Source
MF	(Uruguay) Nicolás Acevedo	(United States) New York City FC	Undisclosed	3 January 2025	
MF	(Brazil) Erick	(Brazil) Athletico Paranaense	€4,500,000	8 January 2025	
MF	(Uruguay) Michel Araújo	(Brazil) São Paulo	€2,800,000	9 January 2025	
MF	(Brazil) Rodrigo Nestor	(Brazil) São Paulo	Loan	9 January 2025	
FW	(Brazil) Willian José	(Russia) Spartak Moscow	Undisclosed	14 January 2025	
DF	(Argentina) Santiago Ramos Mingo	(Argentina) Defensa y Justicia	$4,500,000	16 January 2025	
MF	(Brazil) Kayky	(England) Manchester City	Loan	7 February 2025	
GK	(Brazil) Ronaldo	(Brazil) Atlético Goianiense	Loan	26 February 2025	
DF	(Brazil) Ryan	(Ukraine) Chornomorets Odesa	Loan return	30 June 2025	
MF	(Brazil) Kayky	(England) Manchester City	Undisclosed	30 June 2025	
MF	(Argentina) Mateo Sanabria	(United Arab Emirates) Al-Ain	€5,000,000	26 August 2025	

=== Transfers Out ===
Pos.	Player	Transferred to	Fee	Date	Source
MF	(Uruguay) Carlos de Pena	(Brazil) Coritiba	Contract terminated	1 January 2025	
DF	(Argentina) Víctor Cuesta	(Argentina) Newell's Old Boys	Contract terminated	1 January 2025	
DF	(Bulgaria) Cicinho	(Brazil) Noroeste	Contract terminated	1 January 2025	
MF	(Brazil) Miqueias	(Brazil) América Mineiro	Loan	3 January 2025	
FW	(Brazil) Rafael Ratão	(Japan) Cerezo Osaka	Loan	13 January 2025	
FW	(Brazil) Thaciano	(Brazil) Santos	€4,500,000	13 January 2025	
MF	(Brazil) Diego Rosa	(Brazil) Internacional	Loan	28 February 2025	
DF	(Brazil) Vitor Hugo	(Brazil) Atlético Mineiro	Loan	12 March 2025	
DF	(Brazil) Caio Roque	(Brazil) Volta Redonda	Loan	24 March 2025	
MF	(Brazil) Yago Felipe	(Brazil) Mirassol	Loan	8 April 2025	
DF	(Brazil) Kauã Davi	(Estonia) Levadia	Undisclosed	9 July 2025	
DF	(Brazil) Ryan	(Portugal) Estrela da Amadora	Undisclosed	13 August 2025	

== Exhibition matches ==
5 January 2025	Jequié	1–0	Bahia

== Competitions ==
=== Overall record ===
Competition	First match	Last match	Starting round	Final position	Record							
Competition	First match	Last match	Starting round	Final position	Pld	W	D	L	GF	GA	GD	Win %
Série A	29 March 2025	7 December 2025	Matchday 1	7th	38	17	9	12	50	47	+3	44.74
Campeonato Baiano	12 January 2025	23 March 2025	Matchday 1	Winners	13	7	4	2	24	6	+18	53.85
Copa do Brasil	30 April 2025	10 September 2025	Third Round	Quarter-finals	6	4	1	1	9	4	+5	66.67
Copa do Nordeste	23 January 2025	6 September 2025	Group Stage	Winner	11	9	1	1	29	9	+20	81.82
Copa Libertadores	18 February 2025	28 May 2025	Second stage	Group stage	10	4	3	3	10	8	+2	40.00
Copa Sudamericana	15 July 2025	22 July 2025	Knockout play-offs	Knockout play-offs	2	0	1	1	0	2	−2	0.00
Total					80	41	19	20	122	76	+46	51.25

Last updated: 8 December 2025
Source: Competitions

=== Campeonato Baiano ===
==== First stage ====
12 January 2025 1	Jacuipense	0–0	Bahia	Alagoinhas
16:00 UTC−3		Report		Stadium: Estádio Municipal Antônio de Figueiredo Carneiro; Attendance: 2,079; Referee: Ricarle Gustavo Gonçalves Batista

16 January 2025 2	Bahia	0–1	Atlético de Alagoinhas	Salvador
21:30 UTC−3		Report	Felipe Cardoso 75'	Stadium: Arena Fonte Nova; Attendance: 10,787; Referee: Bruno Nogueira Prado

19 January 2025 3	Jacobina	1–1	Bahia	Jacobina
18:30 UTC−3	Hugo 90+6'	Report	Tiago 45+1'	Stadium: Estádio Municipal José Rocha; Attendance: 1,163; Referee: Reinaldo Silva de Santana

26 January 2025 4	Bahia	2–0	Porto	Salvador
16:00 UTC−3	Everaldo 39'; Erick 86'	Report		Stadium: Arena Fonte Nova; Attendance: 18,145; Referee: Josué Reis de Jesus Júnior

29 January 2025 5	Jequié	1–3	Bahia	Jequié
19:15 UTC−3	Tiago Souza 26'	Report	Erick Pulga 16'; Everaldo 45+4'; Ruan Pablo 90+4'	Stadium: Estádio Waldomiro Borges; Attendance: 3,202; Referee: Ricarle Gustavo Gonçalves Batista

1 February 2025 6	Bahia	0–0	Vitória	Salvador
16:00 UTC−3		Report		Stadium: Arena Fonte Nova; Attendance: 47,895; Referee: Bruno Pereira Vasconcelos

9 February 2025 7	Bahia	6–0	Colo Colo	Salvador
16:00 UTC−3	Kanu 7', 82'; Rodríguez 9', 15', 55'; Willian José 87'	Report		Stadium: Arena Fonte Nova; Attendance: 20,059; Referee: Reinaldo Silva de Santana

15 February 2025 8	Barcelona de Ilhéus	0–1	Bahia	Salvador
16:00 UTC−3		Report	Willian José 37'	Stadium: Estádio Manoel Barradas (Barradão); Attendance: 4,778; Referee: Emerson Souza Silva

22 February 2025 9	Bahia	2–0	Juazeirense	Salvador
18:30 UTC−3	Tiago 7'; Cauly 60'	Report		Stadium: Arena Fonte Nova; Attendance: 16,039; Referee: Wagner Francisco Silva Souza

==== Semifinals ====
1 March 2025 First Leg	Bahia	1–2	Jacuipense	Salvador
16:00 UTC−3	Acevedo 35'	Report	Alison 48'; Vinicius Amaral 56'	Stadium: Arena Fonte Nova; Attendance: 20,523; Referee: José Reis de Jesus Junior

9 March 2025 Second Leg	Jacuipense	0–5 (2–6 agg.)	Bahia	Feira de Santana
18:00 UTC−3		Report	Rodrigo Nestor 12'; Arias 27'; Cauly 69'; Éverton Ribeiro 80'; Erick 86'	Stadium: Estádio Joia da Princesa; Attendance: 3,698; Referee: Eziquiel Sousa Costa

==== Finals ====
16 March 2025 First Leg	Bahia	2–0	Vitória	Salvador
18:00 UTC−3	Xavier 7'; Pulga 45+2'	Report		Stadium: Arena Fonte Nova; Attendance: 42,384; Referee: Rafael Rodrigo Klein

23 March 2025 Second Leg	Vitória	1–1 (1–3 agg.)	Bahia	Salvador
16:00 UTC−3	Claudinho 84'	Report	Kayky 90+18'	Stadium: Barradão; Attendance: 30,581; Referee: Wilton Pereira Sampaio

=== Copa do Nordeste ===
==== Group stage ====
Pos	Team	Pld	W	D	L	GF	GA	GD	Pts	Qualification
1	Bahia	7	5	1	1	17	7	+10	16	Advance to Quarter-finals
2	(Alagoas) CSA	7	4	1	2	14	7	+7	13	Advance to Quarter-finals
3	Ceará	7	4	1	2	9	6	+3	13	Advance to Quarter-finals
4	(Sergipe) Confiança	7	3	2	2	8	5	+3	11	Advance to Quarter-finals
5	(Pernambuco) Náutico	7	2	2	3	5	9	−4	8	

Source: CBF

23 January 2025 1	Bahia	4–0	Sampaio Corrêa	Salvador
20:00 UTC−3	Erick 14'; Rodríguez 45'; Alan 56' (o.g.); Erick Pulga 74'	Report		Stadium: Arena Fonte Nova; Attendance: 30,799; Referee: Diego Roberto Souza de Melo

5 February 2025 2	Juazeirense	0–0	Bahia	Juazeiro
19:00 UTC−3		Report		Stadium: Adautão; Attendance: 2,305; Referee: Luciano da Silva Miranda Filho

12 February 2025 3	Bahia	5–1	América–RN	Salvador
19:00 UTC−3	Rodríguez 12'; Ademir 17'; Erick Pulga 25', 32'; Everaldo 79'	Report	Henrique 85'	Stadium: Arena Fonte Nova; Attendance: 24,242; Referee: Michelangelo Martins de Almeida Júnior

19 March 2025 6	CSA	1–2	Bahia	Maceió
19:00 UTC−3	Brayann 71'		Iago 13'; Erick 25'	Stadium: Estádio Rei Pelé; Attendance: 9,839; Referee: Luciano da Silva Miranda Filho

26 March 2025 4	Bahia	3–2	Ceará	Salvador
19:00 UTC−3	Rodríguez 29'; Erick 46', 64'		Fernandinho 66'; Galeano 83'	Stadium: Arena Fonte Nova; Attendance: 29,119; Referee: Afro Rocha de Carvalho Filho

4 June 2025 5	Confiança	2–0	Bahia	Aracaju
19:00 UTC−3	Neto Oliveira 13', 60'			Stadium: Batistão

7 June 2025 7	Bahia	3–1	Náutico	Salvador
17:30 UTC−3	Tiago 28', 57'; Araújo 77'		Bruno Mezenga 8'	Stadium: Arena Fonte Nova

==== Final stages ====
9 July 2025 Quarter-finals	Bahia	2–1	Fortaleza	Salvador
21:30	Willian José 39' (pen.); Caio Alexandre 45+6'	Report	Matheus Pereira 68'	Stadium: Arena Fonte Nova; Referee: Antônio Dib Moraes de Sousa

20 August 2025 Semi-finals	Bahia	1–0	Ceará	Salvador
21:30	Tiago 90+3'	Report		Stadium: Arena Fonte Nova; Referee: Afro Rocha de Carvalho Filho

3 September 2025 Finals First Leg	Confiança	1–4	Bahia	Aracaju
21:30	Ronald Camarão 49'	Report	Rodríguez 3'; Willian José 26'; Rodrigo Nestor 53'; Rezende 85'	Stadium: Batistão; Referee: Rodrigo José Pereira de Lima

6 September 2025 Finals Second Leg	Bahia	5–0 (9–1 agg.)	Confiança	Salvador
17:30	Tiago 4', 36', 39'; Rodríguez 10'; Rezende 17'	Report		Stadium: Arena Fonte Nova; Referee: Afro Rocha de Carvalho Filho

=== Copa Libertadores ===
==== Qualifying Rounds ====
Second Stage

18 February 2025 First Leg	The Strongest (Bolivia)	1–1	(Brazil) Bahia	La Paz, Bolivia
20:30 UTC−4	Guerrero 38'	Report	Willian José 69'	Stadium: Estadio Hernando Siles; Referee: Guillermo Guerrero (Ecuador)

25 February 2025 Second Leg	Bahia (Brazil)	3–0 (4–1 agg.)	(Bolivia) The Strongest	Salvador, Brazil
21:30 UTC−3	Rodríguez 41' (pen.); Ademir 48', 63'	Report		Stadium: Arena Fonte Nova; Attendance: 45,161; Referee: Carlos Betancur (Colombia)

Third stage

6 March 2025 First Leg	Boston River (Uruguay)	0–0	(Brazil) Bahia	Montevideo, Uruguay
21:30 UTC−3		Report		Stadium: Estadio Centenario; Referee: Juan Gabriel Benítez (Paraguay)

13 March 2025 Second Leg	Bahia (Brazil)	1–0 (1–0 agg.)	(Uruguay) Boston River	Salvador, Brazil
21:30 UTC−3	Jean Lucas 59'	Report		Stadium: Arena Fonte Nova; Referee: Cristian Garay (Chile)

==== Group Stage ====
The draw for the group stage was held on March 17, 2025.

Pos	Team	Pld	W	D	L	GF	GA	GD	Pts	Qualification
1	(Brazil) Internacional	6	3	2	1	12	8	+4	11	Advance to round of 16
2	(Colombia) Atlético Nacional	6	3	0	3	7	6	+1	9	Advance to round of 16
3	(Brazil) Bahia	6	2	1	3	5	7	−2	7	Transfer to Copa Sudamericana
4	(Uruguay) Nacional	6	2	1	3	7	10	−3	7	

Source: CONMEBOL

2 April 2025 1	Bahia (Brazil)	1–1	(Brazil) Internacional	Salvador, Brazil
19:00 UTC−3	Jean Lucas 73'	Report	Valencia 84'	Stadium: Arena Fonte Nova; Attendance: 42,700; Referee: Piero Maza (Chile)

9 April 2025 2	Nacional (Uruguay)	0–1	(Brazil) Bahia	Montevideo, Uruguay
19:00 UTC−3		Report	Erick Pulga 64'	Stadium: Gran Parque Central; Attendance: 30,559; Referee: Darío Herrera (Argentina)

24 April 2025 3	Bahia (Brazil)	1–0	(Colombia) Atlético Nacional	Salvador, Brazil
21:30 UTC−3	Willian José 71'	Report		Stadium: Arena Fonte Nova; Attendance: 40,790; Referee: Mario Díaz de Vivar (Paraguay)

7 May 2025 4	Bahia (Brazil)	1–3	(Uruguay) Nacional	Salvador, Brazil
19:00 UTC−3	Jean Lucas 47'	Report	Morales 57'; Ni. López 69'; Millán 86'	Stadium: Arena Fonte Nova; Attendance: 43,419; Referee: Yael Falcón Pérez (Argentina)

14 May 2025 5	Atlético Nacional (Colombia)	1–0	(Brazil) Bahia	Medellín, Colombia
17:00 UTC−5	Viveros 46'	Report		Stadium: Estadio Atanasio Girardot; Attendance: 44,166; Referee: Darío Herrera (Argentina)

28 May 2025 6	Internacional (Brazil)	2–1	(Brazil) Bahia	Porto Alegre, Brazil
18:00 UTC−3	Vitinho 58'; Borré 77'	Report	Jean Lucas 54'	Stadium: Beira-Rio; Attendance: 33,712; Referee: Facundo Tello (Argentina)

=== Copa Sudamericana ===
==== Final stages ====
===== Knockout Play-offs =====
15 July 2025 First leg	Bahia (Brazil)	0–0	(Colombia) América de Cali	Salvador
21:30 UTC−3		Report		Stadium: Arena Fonte Nova; Referee: Andrés Matonte (Uruguay)

22 July 2025 Second leg	América de Cali (Colombia)	2–0 (2–0 agg.)	(Brazil) Bahia	Cali, Colombia
19:30 UTC−5	Murillo 28'; Garcés 90+6'	Maximiliano Ramírez (Argentina)		Stadium: Estadio Olímpico Pascual Guerrero; Referee: https://www.conmebol.com/analisis-del-partido?competition=32n2r9bl6x90psj0wa7bfs6vq&season=bfz5665mze2yubs4s5t21f66s&match=bnvbxut0lajiub2mapznmrris&disciplina=football

=== Copa do Brasil ===
Bahia will enter the Copa do Brasil in the third round.

==== Third Round ====
30 April 2025 First leg	Paysandu	0–1	Bahia	Belém
21:30 UTC−3		Report	Cauly 42' (pen.)	Stadium: Mangueirão; Attendance: 17,029; Referee: Bruno Arleu de Araujo

21 May 2025 Second leg	Bahia	4–0 (5–0 agg.)	Paysandu	Salvador
21:30 UTC−3	Araújo 3'; Willian José 33', 45+3'; Rodrigo Nestor 66'	Report		Stadium: Arena Fonte Nova; Referee: Joao Vitor Gobi

==== Round of 16 ====
30 July 2025 First leg	Bahia	3–2	Retrô	Salvador
19:30 UTC−3	Rodríguez 18', 19'; Willian José 79'	Report	Diego Guerra 31'; Mascote 86'	Stadium: Arena Fonte Nova; Referee: Flávio Rodrigues de Souza

5 August 2025 Second leg	Retrô	0–0 (2–3 agg.)	Bahia	São Lourenço da Mata
19:30 UTC−3		Report		Stadium: Arena Pernambuco; Referee: Matheus Delgado Candançan

==== Quarter-finals ====
28 August 2025 First leg	Bahia	1–0	Fluminense	Salvador
19:30	Luciano Juba 85'	Report		Stadium: Arena Fonte Nova; Attendance: 43,276; Referee: Raphael Claus

10 September 2025 Second leg	Fluminense	2–0 (2–1 agg.)	Bahia	Rio de Janeiro
19:00	Canobbio 55' (pen.); Thiago Silva 85'	Report		Stadium: Maracanã; Referee: Matheus Delgado Candançan

=== Série A ===
==== League table ====
Pos	Team	Pld	W	D	L	GF	GA	GD	Pts	Qualification or relegation
5	Fluminense	38	19	7	12	50	39	+11	64	Qualification for Copa Libertadores group stage (Note: Flamengo qualified for the Copa Libertadores group stage by winning the 2025 Copa Libertadores.)
6	Botafogo	38	17	12	9	58	38	+20	63	Qualification for Copa Libertadores second stage
7	Bahia	38	17	9	12	50	47	+3	60	Qualification for Copa Libertadores second stage
8	São Paulo	38	14	9	15	43	47	−4	51	Qualification for Copa Sudamericana group stage
9	Grêmio	38	13	10	15	47	50	−3	49	Qualification for Copa Sudamericana group stage

Source: CBF
Rules for classification: 1) points; 2) wins; 3) goal difference; 4) goals scored; 5) head-to-head results (only between two teams); 6) fewest red cards; 7) fewest yellow cards; 8) drawing of lots.

==== Results summary ====
Overall								Home						Away					
Pld	W	D	L	GF	GA	GD	Pts	W	D	L	GF	GA	GD	W	D	L	GF	GA	GD
3	0	2	1	3	6	−3	2	0	1	0	1	1	0	0	1	1	2	5	−3

Last updated: 6 April 2025.

==== Matches ====
The schedule was announced on 12 February 2025.

30 March 2025 1	Bahia	1–1	Corinthians	Salvador
20:00 (UTC-3)	Gilberto 45+1'	Report	Hernández 90'	Stadium: Arena Fonte Nova; Attendance: 41,898; Referee: Bruno Arleu de Araújo

6 April 2025 2	Santos	2–2	Bahia	Santos
20:30 (UTC-3)	Thaciano 50'; Diego Pituca 81'	Report	Erick 17'; Luciano Juba 90'	Stadium: Estádio Urbano Caldeira (Vila Belmiro); Attendance: 8,796; Referee: Alex Gomes Stefano

13 April 2025 3	Bahia	1–1	Mirassol	Salvador
16:00 (UTC-3)	Erick Pulga 40'	Report	Gabriel 17'	Stadium: Arena Fonte Nova; Attendance: 39,873; Referee: Braulio da Silva Machado

17 April 2025 4	Cruzeiro	3–0	Bahia	Belo Horizonte
21:30 (UTC-3)	Lucas Romero 45+7'; Kaio Jorge 65', 76'	Report		Stadium: Estádio Governador Magalhães Pinto (Mineirão); Attendance: 26,557; Referee: Flávio Rodrigues de Souza

21 April 2025 5	Bahia	1–0	Ceará	Salvador
20:00 (UTC-3)	Éverton Ribeiro 90+14' (pen.)	Report		Stadium: Arena Fonte Nova; Attendance: 28,047; Referee: Rafael Rodrigo Klein

27 April 2025 6	Palmeiras	0–1	Bahia	São Paulo
18:30 (UTC-3)		Report	Kayky 90+3'	Stadium: Allianz Parque; Attendance: 29,033; Referee: Wilton Pereira Sampaio

3 May 2025 7	Bahia	1–0	Botafogo	Salvador
21:00 (UTC-3)	Cauly 39'	Report		Stadium: Arena Fonte Nova

10 May 2025 8	Flamengo	1–0	Bahia	Rio de Janeiro
21:00 (UTC-3)	de Arrascaeta 8'	Report		Stadium: Estádio Jornalista Mário Filho (Maracanã); Attendance: 62,204; Referee: Anderson Daronco

18 May 2025 9	Bahia	2–1	Vitória	Salvador
16:00 (UTC-3)	Erick Pulga 23'; Araújo 68'	Report	Renato Kayzer 54'	Stadium: Arena Fonte Nova

25 May 2025 10	Grêmio	1–0	Bahia	Porto Alegre
11:00 (UTC-3)	Braithwaite 61' (pen.)	Report		Stadium: Arena do Grêmio

31 May 2025 11	Bahia	2–1	São Paulo	Salvador
18:30 (UTC-3)	Willian José 53', 73' (pen.)	Report	Luciano 85' (pen.)	Stadium: Arena Fonte Nova; Attendance: 41,041; Referee: Anderson Daronco

11 June 2025 12	Red Bull Bragantino	0–3	Bahia	Bragança Paulista
19:00 (UTC-3)		Report	Luciano Juba 40'; Guilherme 45+6' (o.g.); Araújo 74'	Stadium: Estádio Cícero de Souza Marques

12 July 2025 13	Bahia	2–1	Atlético Mineiro	Salvador
21:00 (UTC-3)	Luciano Juba 53'; Michel Araújo 90+7'	Report	Hulk 90+1'	Stadium: Arena Fonte Nova; Attendance: 30,249; Referee: Davi De Oliveira Lacerda

19 July 2025 15	Fortaleza	1–1	Bahia	Fortaleza
16:00 (UTC-3)	Marinho 20'	Report	Rodrigo Nestor 80'	Stadium: Estádio Governador Plácido Castelo (Castelão)

27 July 2025 17	Bahia	3–0	Juventude	Salvador
18:30 (UTC-3)	Jean Lucas 27', 58'; Rodríguez 90+3'	Report		Stadium: Arena Fonte Nova

2 August 2025 18	Sport	0–0	Bahia	Recife
16:00 (UTC-3)		Report		Stadium: Estádio Adelmar da Costa Carvalho (Ilha do Retiro); Referee: Anderson Daronco

9 August 2025 19	Bahia	3–3	Fluminense	Salvador
21:00 (UTC-3)	Bernal 13' (o.g.); Ribeiro 19'; Juba 89'	Report	Cano 9', 49'; Nonato 72'	Stadium: Arena Fonte Nova; Referee: Jefferson Ferreira de Moraes

16 August 2025 20	Corinthians	1–2	Bahia	São Paulo
21:00 (UTC-3)	Gui Negão 31'	Report	Michel Araújo 2'; Willian José 43' (pen.)	Stadium: Neo Química Arena; Referee: Paulo Cesar Zanovelli

24 August 2025 21	Bahia	2–0	Santos	Salvador
16:00 (UTC-3)	Luciano Juba 12'; Luciano Rodríguez 60'	Report		Stadium: Arena Fonte Nova; Attendance: 45,813; Referee: Rafael Rodrigo Klein

31 August 2025 22	Mirassol	5–1	Bahia	Mirassol
18:30 (UTC-3)	João Victor 2'; Chico 22'; Ronaldo 30' (o.g.); Alesson 59'; Cristian Renato 75'	Report	Rodrigo Nestor 88'	Stadium: Estádio José Maria de Campos Maia

15 September 2025 23	Bahia	1–2	Cruzeiro	Salvador
20:00 (UTC-3)	Jean Lucas 66'	Report	Sinisterra 77'; Gabriel 86'	Stadium: Arena Fonte Nova; Attendance: 32,160; Referee: Flávio Rodrigues de Souza

20 September 2025 24	Ceará	1–1	Bahia	Fortaleza
18:30 (UTC-3)	Lourenço 45+3'	Report	Willian José 56'	Stadium: Estádio Governador Plácido Castelo (Castelão)

24 September 2025 16	Vasco da Gama	3–1	Bahia	Rio de Janeiro
19:30 (UTC-3)	Coutinho 45+1'; Rodríguez 60'; Luciano Juba 77' (o.g.)	Report	Sanabria 31'	Stadium: Estádio Vasco da Gama (São Januário)

28 September 2025 25	Bahia	1–0	Palmeiras	Salvador
16:00 (UTC-3)	Ademir 78'	Report		Stadium: Arena Fonte Nova; Attendance: 45,297; Referee: Anderson Daronco

1 October 2025 26	Botafogo	2–1	Bahia	Rio de Janeiro
21:30 (UTC-3)	Rodríguez 27'; Jeffinho 46'	Report	Rodrigo Nestor 55'	Stadium: Estádio Nilton Santos (Engenhão)

5 October 2025 27	Bahia	1–0	Flamengo	Salvador
18:30 (UTC-3)	Willian José 45'	Report		Stadium: Arena Fonte Nova; Attendance: 48,634; Referee: Rodrigo José Pereira de Lima

16 October 2025 28	Vitória	2–1	Bahia	Salvador
(UTC-3)	Renato Kayzer 26' (pen.); Cáceres 64'	Report	Tiago 41'	Stadium: Estádio Manoel Barradas (Barradão); Attendance: 28,027; Referee: Anderson Daronco

19 October 2025 29	Bahia	4–0	Grêmio	Salvador
(UTC-3)	Iago 4'; Willian José 10'; David Duarte 57'; Nestor 90+3'	Report		Stadium: Arena Fonte Nova; Attendance: 29,376; Referee: Raphael Claus

22 October 2025 14	Bahia	1–0	Internacional	Salvador
19:00 (UTC-3)	Willian José 45+6'	Report		Stadium: Arena Fonte Nova

25 October 2025 30	São Paulo	2–0	Bahia	São Paulo
21:30 (UTC-3)	Luciano 7'; Bobadilla 41'	Report		Stadium: Estádio Cícero Pompeu de Toledo (Morumbi); Attendance: 15,253; Referee: Lucas Paulo Torezin

2 November 2025 31	Bahia	2–1	Red Bull Bragantino	Salvador
15:00 (UTC-3)	Willian José 75', 90'	Report	Matheus Fernandes 20'	Stadium: Arena Fonte Nova; Attendance: 43,129

5 November 2025 32	Atlético Mineiro	3–0	Bahia	Belo Horizonte
20:00 (UTC-3)	Hulk 66'; Igor Gomes 75'; Biel Teixeira 77'	Report		Stadium: Arena MRV; Attendance: 25,506; Referee: Davi de Oliveira Lacerda

8 November 2025 33	Internacional	2–2	Bahia	Salvador
18:30 (UTC-3)	Vitinho 25', 49'	Report	Willian José 60'; Tiago 90+4'	Stadium: Estádio José Pinheiro Borda (Beira-Rio); Attendance: 18,524; Referee: Lucas Paulo Torezin

20 November 2025 34	Bahia	2–3	Fortaleza	Salvador
18:00 (UTC-3)	Willian José 66' (pen.); Tiago 88'	Report	Bareiro 30'; Herrera 36'; Deyverson 75'	Stadium: Arena Fonte Nova

23 November 2025 35	Bahia	1–0	Vasco da Gama	Salvador
16:00 (UTC-3)	Erick Pulga 73'	Report		Stadium: Arena Fonte Nova; Attendance: 43,074

30 November 2025 36	Juventude	1–1	Bahia	Caxias do Sul
19:00 (UTC-3)	Gabriel Taliari 28'	Report	Ademir 21'	Stadium: Estádio Alfredo Jaconi; Attendance: 4,536

3 December 2025 37	Bahia	2–0	Sport	Salvador
20:00 (UTC-3)	Rodrigo Nestor 40'; Luciano Juba 54'	Report		Stadium: Arena Fonte Nova

7 December 2025 38	Fluminense	2–0	Bahia	Rio de Janeiro
15:00 (UTC-3)	Ganso 75'; Thiago Silva 83'	Report		Stadium: Estádio Jornalista Mário Filho (Maracanã); Attendance: 52,268; Referee: Matheus Delgado Candançan
