= Marcos Victor =

Brazilian footballer

Personal information
- Full name: Marcos Victor Ferreira da Silva
- Date of birth: 26 December 2001 (age 24)
- Place of birth: Fortaleza, Brazil
- Height: 1.84 m (6 ft 0 in)
- Position: Centre back

Team information
- Current team: Bahia
- Number: 44

Youth career
- Ferroviário
- 2020–2021: Floresta
- 2021: → Ceará (loan)

Senior career*
Years	Team	Apps	(Gls)
2021–2022	Floresta	0	(0)
2022	→ Ceará (loan)	2	(0)
2022	Ceará	4	(0)
2023–	Bahia	27	(1)
2024	→ Athletico Paranaense (loan)	1	(0)
2025	→ Ceará (loan)	16	(1)
2026	→ Santa Clara (loan)	0	(0)
- * Club domestic league appearances and goals as of 15:27, 13 November 2026 (UTC)

Marcos Victor Ferreira da Silva (born 26 December 2001), known as Marcos Victor, is a Brazilian professional footballer who plays as a central defender for Bahia.

== Club career ==
Born in Fortaleza, Ceará, Marcos Victor represented hometown sides Ferroviário and Floresta as a youth. He made his first team debut with the latter on 21 January 2021, starting in a 0–4 away loss against Icasa for the 2020 Copa Fares Lopes.

In February 2021, Marcos Victor joined Ceará and returned to the under-20 team. His loan was extended for seven months on 28 December of that year, and he was subsequently promoted to the main squad on 6 January 2022.

Marcos Victor made his first team debut with Vozão on 1 February 2022, starting in a 1–0 Copa do Nordeste away win over Sergipe. He made his Série A debut on 14 May, playing the full 90 minutes in a 2–2 home draw against Flamengo.

On 30 June 2022, Marcos Victor signed a permanent contract with Ceará until June 2025. On 18 December, after the club's relegation, he signed a five-year deal with Bahia.

== Career statistics ==
As of 13 November 2026

Club	Season	League			State League		Cup		Continental		Other		Total	
Club	Season	Division	Apps	Goals	Apps	Goals	Apps	Goals	Apps	Goals	Apps	Goals	Apps	Goals
Floresta	2020	Série D	0	0	0	0	—		—		2 (Note: Appearance(s) in Copa Fares Lopes)	0	2	0
Ceará	2022	Série A	6	0	0	0	1	0	3 (Note: Appearance(s) in Copa Sudamericana)	0	2 (Note: Appearance(s) in Copa do Nordeste)	0	12	0
Bahia	2023	Série A	1	0	5	0	2	0	—		4	0	12	0
Bahia	2024	Série A	0	0	3	0	0	0	—		2	0	5	0
Bahia	2025	Série A	—		4	0	0	0	—		0	0	4	0
Bahia	2026	Série A	12	1	2	0	1	0	0	0	—		15	1
Bahia	Total		13	1	14	0	3	0	0	0	6	0	36	1
Athletico Paranaense (loan)	2024	Série A	1	0	—		—		0	0	—		1	0
Ceará (loan)	2025	Série A	15	0	1	1	—		—		1	0	17	1
Santa Clara (loan)	2025–26	Primeira Liga	0	0	—		—		—		—		0	0
Career total			35	1	15	1	4	0	3	0	11	0	68	2

== Honours ==
Bahia

- Campeonato Baiano: 2023, 2025, 2026

Ceará

- Campeonato Cearense: 2025
