= Gabriel Xavier (footballer, born 2001) =

Brazilian footballer

Personal information
- Full name: Gabriel Lheman Xavier
- Date of birth: 6 May 2001 (age 25)
- Place of birth: Andradina, Brazil
- Height: 1.90 m (6 ft 3 in)
- Position: Centre back

Team information
- Current team: Shenzhen Peng City (On loan from Bahia)
- Number: 3

Youth career
- Araçatuba
- 2017–2021: Mirassol
- 2019–2020: → Famalicão (loan)
- 2020–2021: → Bahia (loan)

Senior career*
Years	Team	Apps	(Gls)
2022–	Bahia	102	(2)
2026–	→ Shenzhen Peng City (loan)	14	(1)
- * Club domestic league appearances and goals as of 8 November 2026

Gabriel Lheman Xavier (born 6 May 2001), known as Gabriel Xavier, is a Brazilian footballer who plays as a central defender for Shenzhen Peng City, on loan from Bahia.

== Club career ==
=== Mirassol ===
Born in Andradina, São Paulo, Gabriel Xavier began his career with Araçatuba before joining Mirassol's youth setup in 2017. He made his first team debut on 8 April 2019, coming on as a late substitute for Matheus Felipe in a 3–1 Campeonato Paulista away loss against Red Bull Brasil.

In 2019, Gabriel Xavier moved abroad after being loaned to Portuguese club Famalicão. Upon returning in September 2020, he was promoted to the first team.

=== Bahia ===
On 22 September 2020, Gabriel Xavier was loaned to Bahia, initially for the under-20 side. His loan was extended for a further year the following 23 January, and he signed a permanent contract with the club on 3 February 2022.

After being sparingly used during the 2022 Série B as Bahia achieved promotion, Gabriel Xavier renewed his contract until 2026 on 5 January 2023. He scored his first professional goal on 11 April, netting the winner in a 2–1 away win over Volta Redonda, for the year's Copa do Brasil.

=== Shenzhen ===
On 12 June 2026, Gabriel Xavier was loaned to Shenzhen Peng City.

== Career statistics ==
As of match played 8 November 2026

Appearances and goals by club, season and competition
Club	Season	League			State League		Cup		Continental		Other		Total	
Club	Season	Division	Apps	Goals	Apps	Goals	Apps	Goals	Apps	Goals	Apps	Goals	Apps	Goals
Mirassol	2019	Paulista	—		1	0	—		—		—		1	0
Bahia	2022	Série B	14	0	0	0	2	0	—		0	0	16	0
Bahia	2023	Série A	13	0	4	0	5	1	—		2 (Note: Appearance(s) in Copa do Nordeste)	0	24	1
Bahia	2024	Série A	35	0	8	1	6	0	—		4	0	53	1
Bahia	2025	Série A	13	0	3	1	4	0	4 (Note: Three appearances in Copa Libertadores, one appearance in Copa Sudamericana)	0	4	0	28	1
Bahia	2026	Série A	6	0	6	0	0	0	2 (Note: Appearances in Copa Libertadores)	0	—		14	0
Bahia	Total		81	0	21	2	17	1	6	0	10	0	135	3
Shenzhen Peng City (loan)	2026	Chinese Super League	14	1	—		2	0	—		—		16	1
Career total			95	1	22	2	19	1	6	0	10	0	152	4

== Honours ==
Bahia

- Campeonato Baiano: 2023, 2025
