= 2023 Esporte Clube Bahia season =

Bahia
2023 season
- Chairman: Emerson Ferretti
- Manager: Renato Paiva (until 3 September); Rogério Ceni
- Stadium: Itaipava Arena Fonte Nova
- Série A: 16th
- Campeonato Baiano: Champions (50th title)
- Copa do Nordeste: Group stage
- Copa do Brasil: Quarter-finals
- Top goalscorer: League: Everaldo (9); All: Everaldo (20)
Home colours	Away colours	Third colours

The 2023 season was Bahia's 93rd season in the club's history. Bahia competed in the Campeonato Baiano, Copa do Nordeste, Série A and Copa do Brasil.

== Squad ==
=== First team ===
As of 26 September 2023

Note: Flags indicate national team as defined under FIFA eligibility rules; some limited exceptions apply. Players may hold more than one non-FIFA nationality.

No.	Pos.	Nation	Player
1	GK	BRA	Danilo Fernandes
2	DF	BRA	Gilberto
3	DF	BRA	Gabriel Xavier
4	DF	BRA	Kanu
5	MF	BRA	Rezende
7	FW	BRA	Ademir
8	MF	BRA	Cauly
9	FW	BRA	Everaldo
10	FW	BRA	Biel
11	FW	BRA	Rafael Ratão
12	GK	BRA	Tiago Gomes
13	DF	BRA	André
16	MF	BRA	Thaciano
17	MF	BRA	Diego Rosa
18	MF	BRA	Léo Cittadini
19	MF	ARG	Lucas Mugni
20	MF	BRA	Yago Felipe
21	FW	BRA	Vinícius Mingotti (on loan from Athletico Paranaense)
22	GK	BRA	Marcos Felipe
23	MF	BRA	Patrick Verhon
26	MF	URU	Nicolás Acevedo (on loan from New York City)

No.	Pos.	Nation	Player
27	DF	BRA	Caio Roque
29	FW	BRA	Vítor Jacaré
31	DF	BRA	Vitor Hugo
33	DF	BRA	David Duarte (on loan from Fluminense)
34	DF	BRA	Raul Gustavo (on loan from Corinthians)
35	GK	BRA	Adriel (on loan from Grêmio)
37	FW	BRA	Kayky (on loan from Manchester City)
38	DF	URU	Camilo Cándido (on loan from Nacional)
40	DF	BUL	Cicinho
44	DF	BRA	Marcos Victor
46	FW	BRA	Luciano Juba
66	DF	BRA	Ryan
77	GK	BRA	Mateus Claus
79	DF	BRA	Matheus Bahia

== Statistics ==
=== Overall ===
Games played	67 (13 Campeonato Baiano, 8 Copa do Nordeste, 8 Copa do Brasil, 38 Campeonato Brasileiro)
Games won	27 (9 Campeonato Baiano, 2 Copa do Nordeste, 4 Copa do Brasil, 12 Campeonato Brasileiro)
Games drawn	16 (1 Campeonato Baiano, 3 Copa do Nordeste, 4 Copa do Brasil, 8 Campeonato Brasileiro)
Games lost	24 (3 Campeonato Baiano, 3 Copa do Nordeste, 0 Copa do Brasil, 18 Campeonato Brasileiro)
Goals scored	93
Goals conceded	85
Goal difference	+8
Best results (goal difference)	5–1 (A) v Corinthians - Série A - 2023.11.24
Worst result (goal difference)	0–6 (A) v Sport - Copa do Nordeste - 2023.02.22
Top scorer	Everaldo (20)

Source: EC Bahia official website

=== Goalscorers ===
Place	Position	Nationality	Number	Name	Campeonato Baiano	Copa do Nordeste	Copa do Brasil	Série A	Total
1	FW	(Brazil)	9	Everaldo	6	3	2	9	20
2	FW	(Brazil)	11	Biel	3	0	3	5	11
3	MF	(Brazil)	8	Cauly	3	0	3	4	10
4	MF	(Brazil)	7	Ademir	0	0	0	6	6
=	MF	(Brazil)	16	Thaciano	0	0	0	6	6
=	FW	(Brazil)	29	Vítor Jacaré	1	2	2	1	6
5	FW	(Brazil)	37	Kayky	1	1	0	2	4
=	FW	(Brazil)	11	Rafael Ratão	0	0	0	4	4
=	MF	(Brazil)	5	Rezende	2	0	0	2	4
6	FW	(Brazil)	14	Arthur Sales	0	1	2	0	3
=	MF	(Brazil)	16	Ricardo Goulart	3	0	0	0	3
7	FW	(Brazil)	21	Vinícius Mingotti	0	0	0	2	2
8	FW	(Brazil)	14	Arthur Sales	0	0	0	1	1
=	DF	(Uruguay)	38	Camilo Cándido	0	0	0	1	1
=	DF	(Brazil)	33	David Duarte	0	0	0	1	1
=	FW	(Brazil)	18	Everton	1	0	0	0	1
=	DF	(Brazil)	3	Gabriel Xavier	0	0	1	0	1
=	DF	(Brazil)	2	Gilberto	0	0	0	1	1
=	DF	(Ecuador)	6	Jhoanner Chávez	0	1	0	0	1
=	DF	(Brazil)	4	Kanu	0	0	0	1	1
=	MF	(Argentina)	19	Lucas Mugni	0	1	0	0	1
=	DF	(Brazil)	46	Luciano Juba	0	0	0	1	1
=	DF	(Brazil)	31	Vitor Hugo	0	0	0	1	1
				Own goals	0	0	1	2	3
				Total	20	9	14	50	93

=== Managers performance ===
Name	Nationality	From	To	P	W	D	L	GF	GA	Avg%	Ref
Renato Paiva	Portugal	11 January 2023	3 September 2023	50	20	15	15	66	57	51%	
Rogério Ferreira (c)	Brazil	26 February 2023	26 February 2023	1	0	0	1	0	4	0%	
Rogério Ceni	Brazil	14 September 2023	6 December 2023	16	7	1	8	27	24	45%	

(c) Indicates the caretaker manager

== Competitions ==
=== Overview ===
Competition	First match	Last match	Starting round	Final position	Record							
Competition	First match	Last match	Starting round	Final position	Pld	W	D	L	GF	GA	GD	Win %
Série A	15 April 2023	6 December 2023	Matchday 1	16th	38	12	8	18	50	53	−3	31.58
Campeonato Baiano	11 January 2023	2 April 2023	First stage	Winners	13	9	1	3	20	12	+8	69.23
Copa do Nordeste	22 January 2023	22 March 2023	Group stage	11th	8	2	3	3	9	15	−6	25.00
Copa do Brasil	1 March 2023	12 July 2023	First round	6th	8	4	4	0	14	5	+9	50.00
Total					67	27	16	24	93	85	+8	40.30

Source: Competitions

=== Campeonato Baiano ===
==== First stage ====
11 January 2023 1	Bahia	3–1	Juazeirense	Salvador
19:15 (UTC-3)	Ricardo Goulart 34'; Rezende 38'; Biel 69'	Report	Kesley 74'	Stadium: Estádio Governador Roberto Santos (Pituaçu); Attendance: 24,629; Referee: Bruno Pereira Vasconcelos

15 January 2023 2	Jacuipense	0–1	Bahia	Riachão do Jacuípe
18:30 (UTC-3)		Report	Ricardo Goulart 82'	Stadium: Estádio Eliel Martins; Attendance: 1,845; Referee: Ricarle Gustavo Gonçalves Batista

18 January 2023 3	Bahia	2–1	Atlético de Alagoinhas	Salvador
21:30 (UTC-3)	Biel 12'; Rezende 90+1'	Report	Gustavo Custódio 44'	Stadium: Itaipava Arena Fonte Nova; Attendance: 23,302; Referee: Emerson Ricardo de Almeida Andrade

25 January 2023 4	Jacobinense	1–0	Bahia	Feira de Santana
21:30 (UTC-3)	Júnior Bahia 72' (pen.)	Report		Stadium: Estádio Jodilton Souza (Arena Cajueiro); Referee: Marielson Alves Silva

29 January 2023 5	Bahia	1–0	Vitória	Salvador
16:00 (UTC-3)	Kayky 18'	Report		Stadium: Itaipava Arena Fonte Nova; Attendance: 45,456; Referee: Emerson Ricardo de Almeida Andrade

1 February 2023 6	Barcelona	1–2	Bahia	Ilhéus
21:30 (UTC-3)	Everton Kanela 37'	Report	Biel 71'; Ricardo Goulart 75'	Stadium: Estádio Mário Pessoa; Attendance: 3,000; Referee: Emerson Ricardo de Almeida Andrade

8 February 2023 7	Bahia	2–1	Bahia de Feira	Salvador
21:30 (UTC-3)	Everaldo 59', 90+6' (pen.)	Report	Tiago Corrêa 19' (pen.)	Stadium: Itaipava Arena Fonte Nova; Attendance: 14,128; Referee: Diego Pombo Lopez

11 February 2023 8	Doce Mel	0–1	Bahia	Jequié
18:30 (UTC-3)		Report	Everton 19'	Stadium: Estádio Municipal Waldomiro Borges; Attendance: 477; Referee: Bruno Pereira Vasconcelos

26 February 2023 9	Itabuna	4–0	Bahia	Camacan
16:00 (UTC-3)	Hítalo 1'; Alex Sandre 39', 90+4'; Cesinha 41'	Report		Stadium: Estádio Antônio Elias Ribeiro; Referee: Wagner Francisco Silva Souza

==== Semifinals ====
11 March 2023 First leg	Itabuna	1–0	Bahia	Camacan
16:00 (UTC-3)	Jan Pieter 74'	Report		Stadium: Estádio Antônio Elias Ribeiro; Attendance: 1,794; Referee: Diego Pombo Lopez

18 March 2023 Second leg	Bahia	4–1	Itabuna	Salvador
16:00 (UTC-3)	Everaldo 14' (pen.), 55'; Cauly 52', 86'	Report	Cesinha 77' (pen.)	Stadium: Itaipava Arena Fonte Nova; Attendance: 19,980; Referee: Bruno Pereira Vasconcelos

==== Finals ====
26 March 2023 First leg	Jacuipense	1–1	Bahia	Riachão do Jacuípe
16:00 (UTC-3)	Welder 25'	Report	Everaldo 56'	Stadium: Estádio Eliel Martins; Attendance: 3,435; Referee: Marielson Alves Silva

2 April 2023 Second leg	Bahia	3–0	Jacuipense	Salvador
16:00 (UTC-3)	Everaldo 67'; Cauly 69'; Vítor Jacaré 90+5' (pen.)	Report		Stadium: Itaipava Arena Fonte Nova; Attendance: 48,085; Referee: Diego Pombo Lopez

==== Record ====
Final Position	Points	Matches	Wins	Draws	Losses	Goals For	Goals Away	Win%
1st	28	13	9	1	3	20	12	69%

=== Copa do Nordeste ===
==== Group stage ====
22 January 2023 1	Sampaio Corrêa	1–0	Bahia	São Luís
19:00 (UTC-3)	Vinícius Alves 44'	Report		Stadium: Estádio Governador João Castelo (Castelão); Attendance: 2,344; Referee: Rodrigo José Pereira de Lima

4 February 2023 2	Bahia	2–2	Ferroviário	Salvador
20:30 (UTC-3)	Mugni 60'; Everaldo 85' (pen.)	Report	Erick 55', 90+2'	Stadium: Itaipava Arena Fonte Nova; Attendance: 24,821; Referee: Leonilson Fernandes Trigueiro Filho

14 February 2023 3	Bahia	0–3	Fortaleza	Salvador
21:30 (UTC-3)		Report	Thiago Galhardo 3'; Romarinho 25'; Marcelo Benevenuto 37'	Stadium: Itaipava Arena Fonte Nova; Attendance: 27,262; Referee: Caio Max Augusto Vieira

17 February 2023 4	Atlético de Alagoinhas	1–2	Bahia	Alagoinhas
21:00 (UTC-3)	Lucas Alisson 16'	Report	Vítor Jacaré 22'; Kayky 26'	Stadium: Estádio Municipal Antônio de Figueiredo Carneiro; Referee: Marcelo de Lima Henrique

22 February 2023 5	Sport	6–0	Bahia	Recife
21:30 (UTC-3)	Luciano Juba 18', 26' (pen.); Jorginho 36'; Vagner Love 55', 59'; Sabino 90+3'	Report		Stadium: Estádio Adelmar da Costa Carvalho (Ilha do Retiro); Attendance: 9,709; Referee: Antônio Dib Moraes de Sousa

5 March 2023 6	Bahia	1–1	Vitória	Salvador
16:00 (UTC-3)	Vítor Jacaré 45+4'	Report	Osvaldo 9'	Stadium: Itaipava Arena Fonte Nova; Attendance: 42,734; Referee: Marcelo de Lima Henrique

14 March 2023 7	Fluminense-PI	1–1	Bahia	Teresina
21:30 (UTC-3)	Lucas Manga 49'	Report	Everaldo 66' (pen.)	Stadium: Estádio Lindolfo Monteiro; Referee: Dênis da Silva Serafim

22 March 2023 8	Bahia	3–0	CRB	Salvador
21:30 (UTC-3)	Jhoanner Chávez 3'; Everaldo 29' (pen.); Arthur Sales 90+1'	Report		Stadium: Itaipava Arena Fonte Nova; Attendance: 4,313; Referee: Luiz Cesar de Oliveira Magalhães

==== Record ====
Final Position	Points	Matches	Wins	Draws	Losses	Goals For	Goals Away	Win%
11th	9	8	2	3	3	9	15	25%

=== Copa do Brasil ===
==== First round ====
1 March 2023	Jacuipense	1–4	Bahia	Salvador
21:30 (UTC-3)	Thiago 88'	Report	Biel 22'; Raphael 39' (o.g.); Vítor Jacaré 55'; Cauly 61'	Stadium: Estádio Governador Roberto Santos (Pituaçu); Attendance: 2,639; Referee: Wagner do Nascimento Magalhães

==== Second round ====
8 March 2023	Camboriú	0–1	Bahia	Balneário Camboriú
19:00 (UTC-3)		Report	Biel 10'	Stadium: Estádio das Nações; Attendance: 3,898; Referee: Flávio Rodrigues de Souza

==== Third round ====
11 April 2023	Volta Redonda	1–2	Bahia	Volta Redonda
16:30 (UTC-3)	Gabriel Bahia 59'	Report	Biel 39'; Gabriel Xavier 62'	Stadium: Estádio Municipal General Sylvio Raulino de Oliveira; Attendance: 2,249; Referee: Luiz Flávio de Oliveira

27 April 2023	Bahia	4–0	Volta Redonda	Salvador
19:00 (UTC-3)	Cauly 56'; Arthur Sales 68', 90+4'; Vítor Jacaré 76' (pen.)	Report		Stadium: Itaipava Arena Fonte Nova; Attendance: 20,253; Referee: Sávio Pereira Sampaio

==== Round of 16 ====
17 May 2023	Santos	0–0	Bahia	Santos
19:00 (UTC-3)		Report		Stadium: Estádio Urbano Caldeira (Vila Belmiro); Referee: Sávio Pereira Sampaio

31 May 2023	Bahia	1–1 (4–3 p)	Santos	Salvador
19:00 (UTC-3)	Cauly 69'	Report	Bruno Mezenga 90+5'	Stadium: Itaipava Arena Fonte Nova; Attendance: 34,743; Referee: Bruno Arleu de Araújo
	Penalties
	Cauly (penalty scored); Lucas Mugni (penalty scored); Nicolás Acevedo (penalty scored); Vitor Hugo (penalty scored); Ademir (penalty missed)		(penalty scored) Yeferson Soteldo; (penalty scored) Stiven Mendoza; (penalty scored) Weslley Patati; (penalty missed) Camacho; (penalty missed) Bruno Mezenga

==== Quarter-finals ====
4 July 2023	Bahia	1–1	Grêmio	Salvador
21:00 (UTC-3)	Everaldo 47'	Report	Cuiabano 90+5'	Stadium: Itaipava Arena Fonte Nova; Referee: Ramon Abatti Abel

12 July 2023	Grêmio	1–1 (4–3 p)	Bahia	Porto Alegre
20:05 (UTC-3)	Villasanti 72'	Report	Everaldo 45+5'	Stadium: Arena do Grêmio; Attendance: 35,437; Referee: Wilton Pereira Sampaio
	Penalties
	Reinaldo (penalty scored); Ferreira (penalty scored); Bruno Alves (penalty missed); Villasanti (penalty scored); Bitello (penalty missed); André Henrique (penalty scored)		(penalty scored) Cauly; (penalty scored) Everaldo; (penalty missed) Cicinho; (penalty missed) Acevedo; (penalty scored) Yago Felipe; (penalty missed) Gabriel Xavier

==== Record ====
Final Position	Points	Matches	Wins	Draws	Losses	Goals For	Goals Away	Win%
6th	16	8	4	4	0	14	5	66%

=== Série A ===
==== League table ====
Pos	Team	Pld	W	D	L	GF	GA	GD	Pts	Qualification or relegation
14	Cruzeiro	38	11	14	13	35	32	+3	47	Qualification for Copa Sudamericana group stage
15	Vasco da Gama	38	12	9	17	41	51	−10	45	
16	Bahia	38	12	8	18	50	53	−3	44	
17	Santos (R)	38	11	10	17	39	64	−25	43	Relegation to Campeonato Brasileiro Série B
18	Goiás (R)	38	9	11	18	36	53	−17	38	Relegation to Campeonato Brasileiro Série B

Source: CBF
Rules for classification: 1) points; 2) wins; 3) goal difference; 4) goals scored; 5) head-to-head results (only between two teams); 6) fewest red cards; 7) fewest yellow cards; 8) drawing of lots.
(R) Relegated

==== Results summary ====
Overall								Home						Away					
Pld	W	D	L	GF	GA	GD	Pts	W	D	L	GF	GA	GD	W	D	L	GF	GA	GD
38	12	8	18	50	53	−3	44	8	5	7	29	22	+7	4	3	11	21	31	−10

==== Matches ====
15 April 2023 1	Red Bull Bragantino	2–1	Bahia	Bragança Paulista
18:30 (UTC-3)	Bruno Gonçalves 54'; Eduardo Sasha 70'	Report	Everaldo 45'	Stadium: Estádio Nabi Abi Chedid; Attendance: 3,368; Referee: Maguielson Lima Barbosa

24 April 2023 2	Bahia	1–2	Botafogo	Salvador
20:00 (UTC-3)	Vítor Jacaré 41'	Report	Júnior Santos 29'; Tchê Tchê 78'	Stadium: Itaipava Arena Fonte Nova; Attendance: 27,427; Referee: Raphael Claus

1 May 2023 3	Vasco da Gama	0–1	Bahia	Rio de Janeiro
20:00 (UTC-3)		Report	Thaciano 44'	Stadium: Estádio Vasco da Gama (São Januário); Attendance: 18,341; Referee: Flávio Rodrigues de Souza

7 May 2023 4	Bahia	3–1	Coritiba	Salvador
16:00 (UTC-3)	Victor Luis 16' (o.g.); Biel 65'; David Duarte 68'	Report	Gabriel Boschilia 63'	Stadium: Itaipava Arena Fonte Nova; Attendance: 37,621; Referee: Bruno Mota Correia

10 May 2023 5	Santos	3–0	Bahia	Santos
19:00 (UTC-3)	Deivid Washington 4'; Mendoza 14'; Ângelo 51'	Report		Stadium: Estádio Urbano Caldeira (Vila Belmiro); Attendance: 7,262; Referee: Wagner do Nascimento Magalhães

13 May 2023 6	Bahia	2–3	Flamengo	Salvador
16:00 (UTC-3)	Biel 35'; Ademir 51'	Report	Matheus França 23'; Gabriel 29' (pen.); David Luiz 45+4'	Stadium: Itaipava Arena Fonte Nova; Attendance: 47,656; Referee: Paulo Cesar Zanovelli da Silva

20 May 2023 7	Bahia	1–1	Goiás	Salvador
16:00 (UTC-3)	Everaldo 25'	Report	Bruno Melo 31'	Stadium: Itaipava Arena Fonte Nova; Attendance: 32,519; Referee: Denis da Silva Ribeiro Serafim

28 May 2023 8	Internacional	2–0	Bahia	Porto Alegre
16:00 (UTC-3)	Johnny Cardoso 49'; Wanderson 90+9'	Report		Stadium: Estádio José Pinheiro Borda (Beira-Rio); Attendance: 16,182; Referee: Wagner do Nascimento Magalhães

3 June 2023 9	Fortaleza	0–0	Bahia	Fortaleza
16:00 (UTC-3)		Report		Stadium: Estádio Governador Plácido Castelo (Castelão); Attendance: 38,338; Referee: João Vitor Gobi

10 June 2023 10	Bahia	2–2	Cruzeiro	Salvador
18:30 (UTC-3)	Kayky 18'; Arthur Sales 66'	Report	Bruno Rodrigues 30'; Wesley 45+1'	Stadium: Itaipava Arena Fonte Nova; Attendance: 33,679; Referee: Rodrigo Jose Pereira de Lima

21 June 2023 11	Bahia	1–0	Palmeiras	Salvador
21:30 (UTC-3)	Thaciano 90+3'	Report		Stadium: Itaipava Arena Fonte Nova; Attendance: 30,824; Referee: Wilton Pereira Sampaio

24 June 2023 12	Fluminense	2–1	Bahia	Rio de Janeiro
18:30 (UTC-3)	Lelê 49'; Gabriel Pirani 51'	Report	Vinícius Mingotti 28'	Stadium: Estádio Jornalista Mário Filho (Maracanã); Attendance: 24,507; Referee: Sávio Pereira Sampaio

1 July 2023 13	Bahia	1–2	Grêmio	Salvador
18:30 (UTC-3)	Kayky 20'	Report	Cristaldo 9'; Gustavo Martins 90+5'	Stadium: Itaipava Arena Fonte Nova; Attendance: 33,662; Referee: Marcelo de Lima Henrique

8 July 2023 14	Cuiabá	1–1	Bahia	Cuiabá
16:00 (UTC-3)	Deyverson 18' (pen.)	Report	Alan Empereur 51' (o.g.)	Stadium: Arena Pantanal; Attendance: 10,149; Referee: Wagner do Nascimento Magalhães

16 July 2023 15	Athletico Paranaense	2–0	Bahia	Curitiba
18:30 (UTC-3)	Vitor Roque 23'; Erick 34'	Report		Stadium: Estádio Joaquim Américo Guimarães (Arena da Baixada); Attendance: 17,091; Referee: Rafael Rodrigo Klein

22 July 2023 16	Bahia	0–0	Corinthians	Salvador
18:30 (UTC-3)		Report		Stadium: Itaipava Arena Fonte Nova; Attendance: 42,920; Referee: André Luiz Skettino Policarpo Bento

30 July 2023 17	São Paulo	0–0	Bahia	São Paulo
11:00 (UTC-3)		Report		Stadium: Estádio Cícero Pompeu de Toledo (Morumbi); Attendance: 56,067; Referee: Ramon Abatti Abel

6 August 2023 18	Bahia	3–1	América Mineiro	Salvador
18:30 (UTC-3)	Everaldo 26'; Cauly 60'; Rafael Ratão 69'	Report	Mastriani 52'	Stadium: Itaipava Arena Fonte Nova; Attendance: 33,492; Referee: Matheus Delgado Candançan

13 August 2023 19	Atlético Mineiro	1–0	Bahia	Belo Horizonte
11:00 (UTC-3)	Paulinho 49'	Report		Stadium: Estádio Governador Magalhães Pinto (Mineirão); Attendance: 29,847; Referee: Sávio Pereira Sampaio

20 August 2023 20	Bahia	4–0	Red Bull Bragantino	Salvador
16:00 (UTC-3)	Rezende 8'; Vitor Hugo 37'; Vinícius Mingotti 59'; Cauly 83'	Report		Stadium: Itaipava Arena Fonte Nova; Attendance: 37,667; Referee: Arthur Gomes Rabelo

27 August 2023 21	Botafogo	3–0	Bahia	Rio de Janeiro
16:00 (UTC-3)	Diego Costa 4', 52'; Luis Henrique 76'	Report		Stadium: Estádio Olímpico Nilton Santos (Engenhão); Attendance: 39,610; Referee: Flávio Rodrigues de Souza

3 September 2023 22	Bahia	1–1	Vasco da Gama	Salvador
18:30 (UTC-3)	Ademir 45'	Report	Vegetti 63' (pen.)	Stadium: Itaipava Arena Fonte Nova; Attendance: 45,789; Referee: Ramon Abatti Abel

14 September 2023 23	Coritiba	2–4	Bahia	Curitiba
20:00 (UTC-3)	Andrey 2'; Gómez 90+4'	Report	Rafael Ratão 11'; Thaciano 30'; Ademir 34'; Biel 74'	Stadium: Estádio Major Antônio (Couto Pereira); Attendance: 20,775; Referee: Wagner do Nascimento Magalhães

18 September 2023 24	Bahia	1–2	Santos	Salvador
20:00 (UTC-3)	Cándido 59'	Report	Marcos Leonardo 73'; Furch 90+4'	Stadium: Itaipava Arena Fonte Nova; Attendance: 41,431; Referee: Ramon Abatti Abel

30 September 2023 25	Flamengo	1–0	Bahia	Rio de Janeiro
16:00 (UTC-3)	Pedro 61' (pen.)	Report		Stadium: Estádio Jornalista Mário Filho (Maracanã); Attendance: 46,472; Referee: Sávio Pereira Sampaio

7 October 2023 26	Goiás	4–6	Bahia	Goiânia
16:00 (UTC-3)	Guilherme 27', 45+2' (pen.); Matheus Babi 45+4'; João Magno 50'	Report	Everaldo 15', 37', 53'; Gilberto 18'; Rafael Ratão 56'; Biel 90+5'	Stadium: Estádio Hailé Pinheiro (Serrinha); Attendance: 9,001; Referee: Raphael Claus

18 October 2023 27	Bahia	1–0	Internacional	Salvador
21:30 (UTC-3)	Biel 44'	Report		Stadium: Itaipava Arena Fonte Nova; Attendance: 30,960; Referee: Marcelo de Lima Henrique

21 October 2023 28	Bahia	2–0	Fortaleza	Salvador
18:30 (UTC-3)	Kanu 22'; Rafael Ratão 90+6'			Stadium: Itaipava Arena Fonte Nova; Attendance: 44,771; Referee: Rodrigo José Pereira de Lima

25 October 2023 29	Cruzeiro	3–0	Bahia	Belo Horizonte
20:00 (UTC-3)	Kanu 19' (o.g.); Marlon 53'; Bruno Rodrigues 88'	Report		Stadium: Estádio Governador Magalhães Pinto (Mineirão); Attendance: 36,104; Referee: Flávio Rodrigues de Souza

28 October 2023 30	Palmeiras	1–0	Bahia	São Paulo
19:00 (UTC-3)	Raphael Veiga 38'	Report		Stadium: Allianz Parque; Attendance: 33,747; Referee: Rodrigo José Pereira de Lima

31 October 2023 31	Bahia	1–0	Fluminense	Salvador
19:00 (UTC-3)	Everaldo 40'			Stadium: Itaipava Arena Fonte Nova; Attendance: 34,319; Referee: Edina Alves Batista

4 November 2023 32	Grêmio	1–0	Bahia	Porto Alegre
19:30 (UTC-3)	Suárez 70'	Report		Stadium: Arena do Grêmio; Attendance: 40,154; Referee: Bráulio da Silva Machado

9 November 2023 33	Bahia	0–3	Cuiabá	Salvador
20:00 (UTC-3)		Report	Deyverson 22' (pen.); Isidro Pitta 77'; Ronald 90+8'	Stadium: Itaipava Arena Fonte Nova; Attendance: 33,931; Referee: Felipe Fernandes de Lima

12 November 2023 34	Bahia	1–1	Athletico Paranaense	Salvador
18:30 (UTC-3)	Everaldo 73' (pen.)	Report	Canobbio 87'	Stadium: Itaipava Arena Fonte Nova; Attendance: 33,214; Referee: Rafael Rodrigo Klein

24 November 2023 35	Corinthians	1–5	Bahia	São Paulo
21:00 (UTC-3)	Renato Augusto 67'	Report	Rezende 4'; Cauly 16'; Thaciano 29' (pen.), 85' (pen.); Ademir 75'	Stadium: Neo Química Arena; Attendance: 39,403; Referee: Marcelo de Lima Henrique

29 November 2023 36	Bahia	0–1	São Paulo	Salvador
20:00 (UTC-3)		Report	Caio Paulista 90+7'	Stadium: Itaipava Arena Fonte Nova; Attendance: 45,756; Referee: Bráulio da Silva Machado

3 December 2023 37	América Mineiro	3–2	Bahia	Belo Horizonte
18:30 (UTC-3)	Ricardo Silva 29'; Renato Marques 37', 46'	Report	Everaldo 26'; Ademir 56'	Stadium: Estádio Raimundo Sampaio (Independência); Attendance: 2,471; Referee: Marcelo de Lima Henrique

6 December 2023 38	Bahia	4–1	Atlético Mineiro	Salvador
21:30 (UTC-3)	Cauly 11'; Luciano Juba 45+6'; Thaciano 67'; Ademir 90+2'	Report	Paulinho 35'	Stadium: Itaipava Arena Fonte Nova; Attendance: 27,743; Referee: Ramon Abatti Abel
