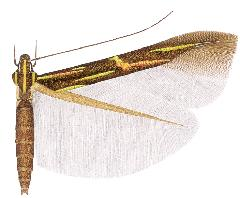

Scientific classification
- Kingdom: Animalia
- Phylum: Arthropoda
- Clade: Pancrustacea
- Class: Insecta
- Order: Lepidoptera
- Family: Cosmopterigidae
- Genus: Cosmopterix
- Species: C. beckeri

Binomial name
- Cosmopterix beckeri Koster, 2010

= Cosmopterix beckeri =

Species of moth

Cosmopterix beckeri is a moth of the family Cosmopterigidae. It is known from Santa Catarina, Brazil.

Adults have been collected in September.

== Description ==
Male. Forewing length 4.4 mm. Head: frons shining brownish grey with greenish and reddish reflections, vertex and neck tufts shining dark brown with reddish gloss, laterally lined white, medially broadly lined pale golden metallic with strong greenish reflection, collar shining dark brown with greenish and reddish gloss; labial palpus first segment very short, shining ochreous, second segment four-fifths of the length of third, shining dark brown with greenish and reddish reflections, third segment dark brown with an indistinct and interrupted white line on outside; scape dorsally dark brown, ventrally pale brown, antenna shining dark brownish grey with reddish gloss. Thorax and tegulae shining dark brown with reddish gloss, thorax with a broad pale golden metallic median line, tegulae broadly lined pale golden metallic inwardly, pale golden lines on thorax and tegulae with strong greenish reflection. Legs: shining dark brown with reddish gloss, tibia of foreleg with a pale golden longitudinal line with greenish reflection and a white dorsal spot, tarsal segments lined white on segments one, two and three in basal half, segment five entirely pale brown, tibia of midleg with oblique pale golden metallic basal and medial lines and a whitish apical ring, tarsal segments one and two with white dorsal lines, femur of hindleg shining golden, tibia of hindleg with a very oblique pale golden line from base to one-half, a pale golden medial and subapical ring and a white apical ring, the pale golden markings with strong greenish reflection, tarsal segments one to three with ochreous-white apical rings, segment five entirely white, spurs shining dark brown ventrally. Forewing shining dark brown with reddish gloss, four broad pale golden metallic lines with strong greenish and reddish reflections in the basal area, a short subcostal from one-fifth to one-quarter, a second subcostal from base and ending just before the end of the first subcostal, a subdorsal from one-fifth almost to the fascia in the middle, a dorsal from beyond base to one-quarter, an inwardly oblique and irregular fascia with strong greenish and reddish reflections, in the middle, not reaching dorsum and with a long protrusion to tornus, a pale golden metallic apical line starting subcostally at three-quarters almost to apex, a few very narrow bluish streaks below and beyond the distal end of the apical line, all pale golden metallic markings with strong bluish green and reddish reflections, cilia dark brown, paler towards dorsum. Hindwing shining greyish brown with greenish and reddish gloss, cilia brown. Underside: forewing shining dark greyish brown, hindwing shining dark greyish brown. Abdomen dorsally shining dark brown with reddish gloss, ventrally shining dark brown with segments broadly banded shining golden posteriorly, anal tuft brownish grey.

== Etymology ==
The species is dedicated to its collector Dr Vitor Becker, Camacan, Brazil.
