= Renato Neto =

Brazilian footballer

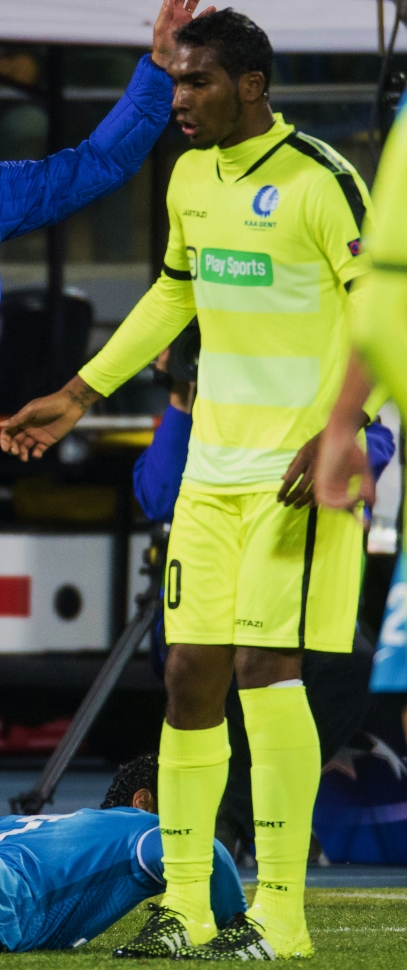
- Neto with Gent in 2015

Personal information
- Full name: Renato Cardoso Porto Neto
- Date of birth: 27 September 1991 (age 35)
- Place of birth: Camacan, Brazil
- Height: 1.84 m (6 ft 0 in)
- Position: Midfielder

Team information
- Current team: Blankenberge
- Number: 8

Youth career
- 2004–2007: Catarinense
- 2007–2010: Sporting CP

Senior career*
Years	Team	Apps	(Gls)
2009–2014	Sporting CP	8	(1)
2010–2011	→ Cercle Brugge (loan)	54	(5)
2012	→ Videoton (loan)	14	(1)
2013–2014	→ Gent (loan)	51	(2)
2014–2019	Gent	94	(14)
2019–2020	Oostende	10	(0)
2020–2021	Deinze	14	(0)
2022	Sirens	10	(1)
2023–	Blankenberge	25	(1)
- * Club domestic league appearances and goals as of 18:53, 15 January 2026 (UTC)

Renato Cardoso Porto Neto (born 27 September 1991) is a Brazilian professional footballer who plays as a midfielder for Belgian club KSC Blankenberge.

After starting out at Sporting CP, he went on to play professionally in Belgium, Hungary and Malta, notably winning the 2014–15 Belgian Pro League with Gent while totalling 181 appearances.

== Club career ==
=== Sporting CP ===
Born in Camacan, Bahia, Neto started his career with Academia Catarinense de Futebol, a small club based in Santa Catarina where he was spotted by Sporting CP at the age of 16, going on to be part of the latter's junior teams that won three national championships in a row.

Neto made his debut for the Lions' main squad on 24 May 2009, featuring four minutes in a 3–1 home win over C.D. Nacional after replacing his compatriot Derlei. His second Primeira Liga appearance came one year later, against Leixões SC (one minute played).

After graduating from Sporting's academy, Neto was loaned to Cercle Brugge K.S.V. in Belgium alongside teammate Nuno Reis. In his only full season in the Pro League, he scored four goals in 36 matches (32 starts) as the side finished in ninth position.

In late December 2011, as Sporting were facing an injury crisis in midfield, Neto was recalled by the club's manager Domingos Paciência. He scored his only league goal on 22 April 2012, in the 3–2 victory at C.D. Nacional where he was replaced at half-time by Stijn Schaars.

Neto was loaned again in summer 2012, now to Hungary's Videoton FC. He left for K.A.A. Gent in the following transfer window, also on loan.

=== Gent ===
Gent acquired Neto on a permanent basis for the 2014–15 campaign. On 21 May 2015, through a penalty kick, he was one of two players on target as his team defeated Standard Liège 2–0 at home to be crowned champions for the first time in their history.

Neto nearly completed a transfer to newly promoted Premier League club Brighton & Hove Albion in 2017, but failed a medical. He missed the entire 2017–18 due to a serious knee injury.

=== Later career ===
On 20 May 2019, Neto joined K.V. Oostende on a one-year contract. He then represented in quick succession K.M.S.K. Deinze (Belgian Challenger Pro League), Sirens F.C. (Maltese Premier League) and KSC Blankenberge, achieving promotion with the amateurs to the Belgian Division 3 in 2023.

== Career statistics ==
As of 22 November 2018

Club	Season	League		Cup		League Cup		Europe		Other		Total	
Club	Season	Apps	Goals	Apps	Goals	Apps	Goals	Apps	Goals	Apps	Goals	Apps	Goals
Sporting CP	2008–09	1	0	0	0	0	0	0	0	0	0	1	0
Sporting CP	2009–10	1	0	0	0	0	0	0	0	0	0	1	0
Sporting CP	2011–12	6	1	1	0	0	0	4	0	0	0	11	1
Sporting CP	Total	8	1	1	0	0	0	4	0	0	0	13	1
Cercle Brugge	2010–11	28	4	5	1	0	0	4	0	8	0	45	5
Cercle Brugge	2011–12	18	1	1	0	0	0	0	0	0	0	19	1
Cercle Brugge	Total	46	5	6	1	0	0	4	0	8	0	64	6
Videoton	2012–13	14	1	0	0	2	1	8	0	0	0	24	2
Videoton	Total	14	1	0	0	2	1	8	0	0	0	24	2
Gent	2012–13 (loan)	8	0	1	0	0	0	0	0	9	0	18	0
Gent	2013–14 (loan)	28	2	5	2	0	0	0	0	6	0	39	4
Gent	2014–15	27	4	5	0	0	0	0	0	7	3	39	7
Gent	2015–16	25	2	5	0	0	0	8	0	11	1	49	3
Gent	2016–17	21	4	1	0	0	0	10	3	3	0	35	7
Gent	2018–19	1	0	0	0	0	0	0	0	0	0	1	0
Gent	Total	110	12	17	2	0	0	18	3	36	4	181	21
Career totals		178	19	24	3	2	1	34	3	44	4	282	30

== Honours ==
Gent

- Belgian Pro League: 2014–15
- Belgian Super Cup: 2015
