= Caio Roque =

Brazilian footballer (born 2002)

Personal information
- Full name: Caio Alves Roque Gomes
- Date of birth: 9 January 2002 (age 24)
- Place of birth: Salvador, Brazil
- Height: 1.82 m (6 ft 0 in)
- Position: Left-back

Team information
- Current team: Portuguesa

Youth career
- 2015–2020: Flamengo
- 2020–2021: Lommel

Senior career*
| Years | Team | Apps | (Gls) |
| 2021–2023 | Lommel | 32 | (1) |
| 2023–2025 | Bahia | 8 | (0) |
| 2024 | → Londrina (loan) | 6 | (0) |
| 2025 | → Volta Redonda (loan) | 9 | (0) |
| 2026– | Portuguesa | 7 | (0) |
| 2026 | → Botafogo (loan) | 3 | (0) |

International career
| 2019 | Brazil U18 | 1 | (0) |
- * Club domestic league appearances and goals as of 16:27, 26 August 2026 (UTC)

Caio Alves Roque Gomes (born 9 January 2002), known as Caio Roque, is a Brazilian professional footballer who plays as a left-back for Portuguesa.

== Club career ==
=== Early career ===
Born in Salvador, Bahia, Caio Roque joined Flamengo's youth categories at the age of 13. On 3 March 2020, he renewed his contract with the club until 2024, having a € 70 million release clause.

=== Lommel ===
On 14 August 2020, before even making his first team debut, Caio Roque was sold to the City Football Group for a rumoured fee of R$ 10 million for 50% of his economic rights; he was assigned to Lommel on a five-year contract. Initially a member of the youth team, he made his professional debut on 24 April 2021, coming on as a late substitute for Kevin Kis in a 3–1 home loss to RFC Seraing.

Caio Roque subsequently became a regular starter for Lommel, and scored his first goal for the club on 15 September 2021, netting the equalizer in a 4–2 away win over Diegem Sport for the Belgian Cup. In December 2022, he suffered a knee injury.

=== Bahia ===
On 8 August 2023, despite being still injured, Caio Roque returned to his home country and joined Bahia, also owned by the City Football Group. He was only declared fit to play in January 2024, he played in the Campeonato Baiano with a reserve side.

On 9 May 2024, Caio Roque was loaned to Série C side Londrina until the end of the year. Upon returning in January 2025, he again featured with the reserve squad before moving to Volta Redonda in the Série B also in a temporary deal on 24 March 2025.

=== Portuguesa ===
On 2 January 2026, Portuguesa announced the signing of Caio Roque on a one-year deal. On 16 March, he moved to top tier side Botafogo on loan until December, but had his loan cut short in August after just six matches.

== Career statistics ==
As of 26 August 2026

| Club | Season | League | | | State League (Note: Includes Campeonato Baiano) | | Cup (Note: Includes Belgian Cup, Copa do Brasil) | | Continental | | Other | | Total | |
| Club | Season | Division | Apps | Goals | Apps | Goals | Apps | Goals | Apps | Goals | Apps | Goals | Apps | Goals |
|---|---|---|---|---|---|---|---|---|---|---|---|---|---|---|
| Lommel | 2020–21 | Belgian First Division B | 1 | 0 | — | | 0 | 0 | — | | 0 | 0 | 1 | 0 |
| Lommel | 2021–22 | Belgian First Division B | 15 | 0 | — | | 3 | 1 | — | | 0 | 0 | 18 | 1 |
| Lommel | 2022–23 | Belgian First Division B | 16 | 1 | — | | 2 | 0 | — | | 0 | 0 | 18 | 1 |
| Lommel | Total | | 32 | 1 | — | | 5 | 1 | — | | 0 | 0 | 37 | 2 |
| Bahia | 2023 | Série A | 0 | 0 | — | | 0 | 0 | — | | — | | 0 | 0 |
| Bahia | 2024 | Série A | — | | 5 | 0 | 0 | 0 | 0 | 0 | 2 (Note: Appearance(s) in Copa do Nordeste) | 0 | 7 | 0 |
| Bahia | 2025 | Série A | — | | 3 | 0 | — | | — | | 0 | 0 | 3 | 0 |
| Bahia | Total | | 0 | 0 | 8 | 0 | 0 | 0 | 0 | 0 | 2 | 0 | 10 | 0 |
| Londrina (loan) | 2024 | Série C | 6 | 0 | — | | — | | — | | — | | 6 | 0 |
| Volta Redonda (loan) | 2025 | Série B | 9 | 0 | — | | — | | — | | — | | 9 | 0 |
| Portuguesa | 2026 | Série D | 0 | 0 | 7 | 0 | 2 | 0 | — | | — | | 9 | 0 |
| Botafogo (loan) | 2026 | Série A | 3 | 0 | — | | 1 | 0 | 2 (Note: Appearance(s) in Copa Sudamericana) | 0 | — | | 6 | 0 |
| Career total | | | 50 | 1 | 15 | 0 | 8 | 1 | 2 | 0 | 2 | 0 | 77 | 2 |
