= Vinícius Mingotti =

Brazilian footballer

Vinicius Mingotti
Personal information
- Full name: Vinicius Alessandro Mingotti
- Date of birth: 7 January 2000 (age 26)
- Place of birth: São Carlos, Brazil
- Height: 1.84 m (6 ft 0 in)
- Position: Forward

Team information
- Current team: Operário Ferroviário
- Number: 9

Youth career
- –2018: Grêmio Novorizontino
- 2018: São Paulo
- 2018–2020: Athletico Paranaense

Senior career*
| Years | Team | Apps | (Gls) |
| 2020–2024 | Athletico Paranaense | 28 | (3) |
| 2022 | → Tombense (loan) | 19 | (2) |
| 2022 | → Mirassol (loan) | 14 | (7) |
| 2023 | → Operário Ferroviário (loan) | 12 | (7) |
| 2023 | → Bahia (loan) | 17 | (2) |
| 2024 | Moreirense | 16 | (1) |
| 2024– | Operário Ferroviário | 63 | (8) |
- * Club domestic league appearances and goals as of 18 November 2026

Vinicius Alessandro Mingotti (born 7 January 2000) is a Brazilian professional footballer who plays as a forward for Campeonato Brasileiro Série B club Operário Ferroviário.

== Career ==
On 11 January 2024, Mingotti left Série A club Athletico Paranaense and moved to Portugal, signing a three-and-a-half-year contract with Primeira Liga side Moreirense.

In July 2024, Mingotti returned to Operário Ferroviário Esporte Clube; a club he also spent the 2023 season with on loan.

== Career statistics ==
=== Club ===
As of 20 April 2023.

Appearances and goals by club, season and competition
| Club | Season | League | | | State league | | Cup | | Continental | | Other | | Total | |
| Club | Season | Division | Apps | Goals | Apps | Goals | Apps | Goals | Apps | Goals | Apps | Goals | Apps | Goals |
|---|---|---|---|---|---|---|---|---|---|---|---|---|---|---|
| Athletico Paranaense | 2020 | Série A | 6 | 0 | 4 | 1 | 0 | 0 | 0 | 0 | 0 | 0 | 10 | 1 |
| Athletico Paranaense | 2021 | Série A | 6 | 0 | 12 | 2 | 4 | 0 | 0 | 0 | — | | 22 | 2 |
| Athletico Paranaense | Total | | 12 | 0 | 16 | 3 | 4 | 0 | 0 | 0 | 0 | 0 | 32 | 3 |
| Tombense (loan) | 2022 | Série B | 7 | 0 | 12 | 2 | 2 | 0 | — | | — | | 21 | 2 |
| Mirassol (loan) | 2022 | Série C | 14 | 7 | — | | — | | — | | — | | 14 | 7 |
| Operário Ferroviário (loan) | 2023 | Série C | 0 | 0 | 12 | 7 | 1 | 0 | — | | — | | 13 | 7 |
| Bahia (loan) | 2023 | Série A | 0 | 0 | — | | — | | — | | — | | 0 | 0 |
| Career total | | | 33 | 7 | 40 | 12 | 7 | 0 | 0 | 0 | 0 | 0 | 80 | 19 |

== Honours ==
Athletico Paranaense

- Campeonato Paranaense: 2020

Mirassol

- Campeonato Brasileiro Série C: 2022

Operário Ferroviário

- Campeonato Paranaense: 2025
