= Éverton Ribeiro =

Brazilian footballer (born 1989)

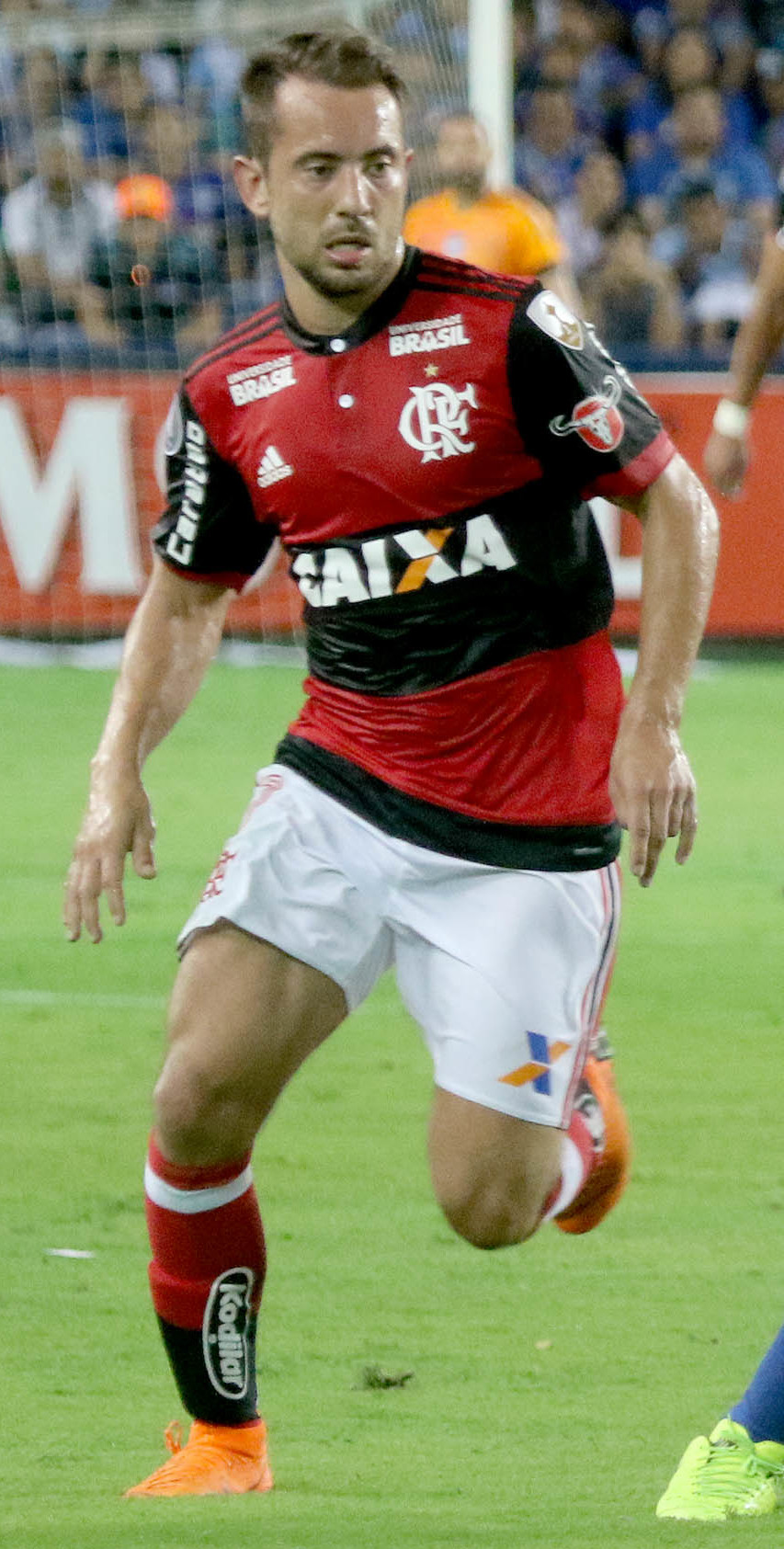
- Ribeiro playing for Flamengo in 2018

Personal information
- Full name: Éverton Augusto de Barros Ribeiro
- Date of birth: 10 April 1989 (age 37)
- Place of birth: Arujá, São Paulo, Brazil
- Height: 1.71 m (5 ft 7 in)
- Positions: Attacking midfielder; winger

Team information
- Current team: Bahia
- Number: 10

Youth career
- Santa Isabel FC
- 2001–2007: Corinthians

Senior career*
Years	Team	Apps	(Gls)
2007–2011	Corinthians	14	(0)
2008–2011	→ São Caetano (loan)	99	(8)
2011–2013	Coritiba	66	(14)
2013–2015	Cruzeiro	88	(19)
2015–2017	Al-Ahli	60	(17)
2017–2023	Flamengo	275	(30)
2024–	Bahia	100	(6)

International career
2007	Brazil U18 (Note: Éverton Ribeiro played 3 times for Brazil U18 and scored 1 goal in them; 3 matches and 1 goal at 2007 Sendai Cup.)	3	(1)
2008	Brazil U19 (Note: Éverton Ribeiro was called up for Brazil U19 in 2008 for an unofficial friendly match against Wisła Kraków and an official friendly match against Canada U19/U20, but the match against Canada was cancelled, and so he made no official appearances for Brazil U19.)	0	(0)
2009	Brazil U20	5	(0)
2014–2022	Brazil	22	(3)
Medal record
Men's football
Representing Brazil
Copa América
Runner-up	2021 Brazil
- * Club domestic league appearances and goals as of 03:12, 22 July 2026 (UTC)

Éverton Augusto de Barros Ribeiro (born 10 April 1989) is a Brazilian professional footballer who plays as an attacking midfielder or winger for Campeonato Brasileiro Série A club Bahia.

Formed at Corinthians, Éverton was sold to Coritiba in 2011 after a loan at São Caetano, winning the Campeonato Paranaense in both of his seasons. He also won Série A twice at Cruzeiro, being voted the best player of each season. He joined Al-Ahli Dubai for €15 million in 2014, winning several items of silverware in the United Arab Emirates before returning to Brazil with Flamengo in 2017.

A full international from 2014 to 2022, Éverton represented Brazil at the Copa América in 2015, 2021 and 2022 FIFA World Cup.

== Club career ==
=== Corinthians ===
Born in Arujá but raised in Santa Isabel, both in the state of São Paulo, Ribeiro joined Corinthians' youth setup in 2001, aged ten, as a left-back. Promoted to the main squad in 2007 by manager Paulo César Carpegiani, he only appeared in four matches during that year, being relegated with the side.

==== São Caetano (loan) ====
On 21 July 2008, after the arrival of Wellington Saci, Ribeiro was loaned to São Caetano, being successfully converted to an attacking midfielder during his two-year spell at the side.

=== Coritiba ===
Ribeiro returned to Timão in January 2011, but was sold to Coritiba for a R$1.5 million fee on 21 February. He made eight appearances as the team won the year's Campeonato Paranaense, scoring in the third minute on 17 April to open a 4–1 win at Roma Esporte Apucarana.

The following season, Ribeiro scored five times in 15 games as the team defended their title. On 6 May 2012, in the first leg of the final away to rivals Clube Atlético Paranaense, he opened a 2–2 draw. A week later, he struck the decisive effort as his team won in a penalty shootout at the Estadio Major Antonio do Couto Pereira.

Ribeiro finished the 2012 campaign for Coxa as the club's topscorer in Série A along with teammate Deivid, with eight goals. On 26 August 2012, Ribeiro was sent off in a 3–1 loss at Figueirense for a foul on Fernandes.

=== Cruzeiro ===
On 8 January 2013, Cruzeiro reached an agreement with Coritiba for Ribeiro, and he signed a four-year deal three days later.

Ribeiro was a key attacking unit for Raposa during his two-year spell, along with Ricardo Goulart. He was also elected Série A's best player of the year twice in a row, as his side was crowned champions twice.

=== Al-Ahli ===
After being linked to Manchester United, Milan, Monaco and Real Madrid during the 2015 winter transfer window, Ribeiro moved to UAE Arabian Gulf League club Al-Ahli Dubai on 2 February 2015 for a reported €15 million transfer fee.

Two days later, he made his debut in the 2014–15 Arabian Gulf League, opening a 2–0 home win over Al-Sharjah from Luis Jiménez's assist, a minute after replacing Habib Fardan. He won his first silverware with the club on 27 March, coming on as a substitute at the end of the Super Cup 1–0 win over Al Ain at the Mohammed Bin Zayed Stadium in Abu Dhabi. He finished the campaign with 3 goals in 12 league games. In the 2015 AFC Champions League, he struck 4 goals in 14 matches, including one in the semi-final second leg 4–3 aggregate victory over Al-Hilal; the team lost the continental final by one goal to Guangzhou Evergrande Taobao.

On 19 August 2015, in the first game of the new national season, Ribeiro scored twice – including a penalty kick – in an 8–1 home win over Al-Fujairah, and assisted compatriot Lima for two more. His team won the league, and Ribeiro told the media that the victory justified his surprise transfer to the team.

=== Flamengo ===
On 5 June 2017, an associate of Ribeiro said that he had rescinded his contract with Al Ahli in order to return to Brazilian football. Later that day he signed with Flamengo, who paid €6 million for 100% of his economic rights, under a contract that runs until 2021.

On 13 December 2019, Ribeiro extended his contract with Flamengo until December 2023.

=== Bahia ===
On 6 January 2024, Ribeiro signed a two-year contract with Série A club Bahia.

== International career ==
After representing Brazil in the under-20 level, Ribeiro was called up to the main for two matches against Colombia and Ecuador by new manager Dunga on 19 August 2014. He made his debut for Brazil in a friendly against Colombia on 5 September, coming on as a substitute for Willian in a 1–0 win at Sun Life Stadium, Miami.

On 5 May 2015, Ribeiro was called up for the year's Copa América, held in Chile. In the quarter-final against Paraguay, he replaced goalscorer Robinho for the final three minutes of a 1–1 draw, and then missed in the penalty shootout which eliminated Brazil.

On 17 June 2021, he scored the third goal in a 4–0 win over Peru in Brazil's second group match of the 2021 Copa América on home soil.

On 7 November 2022, Ribeiro was named in the squad for the 2022 FIFA World Cup.

== Career statistics ==
=== Club ===
As of match played 21 July 2026

Appearances and goals by club, season and competition
Club	Season	League			State league (Note: Includes Campeonato Paulista, Campeonato Paranaense, Campeonato Mineiro, Campeonato Carioca, Campeonato Baiano)		National cup		Continental		Other		Total	
Club	Season	Division	Apps	Goals	Apps	Goals	Apps	Goals	Apps	Goals	Apps	Goals	Apps	Goals
Corinthians	2007	Série A	4	0	2	0	2	0	—		—		8	0
Corinthians	2008	Série B	1	0	7	0	2	0	—		—		10	0
Corinthians	Total		5	0	9	0	4	0	—		—		18	0
São Caetano (loan)	2008	Série B	12	0	—		—		—		—		12	0
São Caetano (loan)	2009	Série B	30	2	7	0	—		—		—		37	2
São Caetano (loan)	2010	Série B	29	4	21	2	—		—		—		50	6
São Caetano (loan)	Total		71	6	28	2	—		—		—		99	8
Coritiba	2011	Série A	14	0	9	1	3	1	—		—		26	2
Coritiba	2012	Série A	29	8	15	5	10	4	2 (Note: Appearances in Copa Sudamericana)	1	—		56	18
Coritiba	Total		43	8	24	6	13	5	2	1	—		82	20
Cruzeiro	2013	Série A	35	7	13	5	6	3	—		—		54	15
Cruzeiro	2014	Série A	31	6	9	1	4	0	10 (Note: Appearances in Copa Libertadores)	1	—		54	8
Cruzeiro	Total		66	13	22	6	10	3	10	1	—		108	23
Al-Ahli	2014–15	UAE Pro League	12	3	—		—		8 (Note: Appearances in AFC Champions League)	3	1 (Note: Appearance in UAE Super Cup)	0	21	6
Al-Ahli	2015–16	UAE Pro League	26	9	—		7	1	6	1	—		39	11
Al-Ahli	2016–17	UAE Pro League	22	5	—		9	1	8	2	1	0	40	8
Al-Ahli	Total		60	17	—		16	2	22	6	2	0	100	25
Flamengo	2017	Série A	29	4	0	0	—		10	2	1 (Note: Appearance in Primeira Liga)	1	40	7
Flamengo	2018	Série A	35	6	9	1	6	1	7	2	—		57	10
Flamengo	2019	Série A	32	2	12	1	4	0	12	3	2 (Note: Appearances in FIFA Club World Cup)	0	62	6
Flamengo	2020	Série A	33	7	12	1	3	0	6	2	3 (Note: Two appearances in Recopa Sudamericana, one appearance in Supercopa do Brasil)	0	57	10
Flamengo	2021	Série A	22	2	8	0	6	0	13	0	1 (Note: Appearance in Supercopa do Brasil)	0	50	2
Flamengo	2022	Série A	30	2	12	1	8	0	12	4	1	0	63	7
Flamengo	2023	Série A	30	3	11	0	7	0	9	0	5 (Note: One appearance in Supercopa do Brasil, two appearances in FIFA Club World Cup, two appearances in Recopa Sudamericana)	0	62	3
Flamengo	Total		211	26	64	4	34	1	69	13	13	1	391	45
Bahia	2024	Série A	37	2	7	4	8	0	—		9 (Note: Appearances in Copa do Nordeste)	0	61	6
Bahia	2025	Série A	31	2	7	1	5	0	11 (Note: Ten appearances in Copa Libertadores, one appearance in Copa Sudamericana)	0	6	0	60	3
Bahia	2026	Série A	15	0	3	1	2	0	1	0	—		21	1
Bahia	Total		83	4	17	6	15	0	12	0	15	0	142	10
Career total			539	74	164	24	92	11	115	21	30	1	940	131

=== International ===
Appearances and goals by national team and year
National team	Year	Apps	Goals
Brazil	2014	3	0
Brazil	2015	3	0
Brazil	2016	0	0
Brazil	2017	0	0
Brazil	2018	0	0
Brazil	2019	0	0
Brazil	2020	4	0
Brazil	2021	9	3
Brazil	2022	3	0
Total		22	3

As of match played 9 September 2021
Scores and results list Brazil's goal tally first, score column indicates score after each Éverton Ribeiro goal.

List of international goals scored by Éverton Ribeiro
No.	Date	Venue	Opponent	Score	Result	Competition	Ref.
1	17 June 2021	Estádio Olímpico Nilton Santos, Rio de Janeiro, Brazil	Peru	3–0	4–0	2021 Copa América	
2	2 September 2021	Estadio Monumental David Arellano, Santiago, Chile	Chile	1–0	1–0	2022 FIFA World Cup qualification	
3	9 September 2021	Arena Pernambuco, São Lourenço da Mata, Brazil	Peru	1–0	2–0	2022 FIFA World Cup qualification	

== Honours ==
Coritiba

- Campeonato Paranaense: 2011, 2012

Cruzeiro

- Campeonato Brasileiro Série A: 2013, 2014
- Campeonato Mineiro: 2014

Al Ahli

- UAE League: 2015–16
- UAE Super Cup: 2014, 2016
- UAE League Cup: 2016–17
- AFC Champions League Runners-up: 2015

Flamengo

- Copa Libertadores: 2019, 2022
- Recopa Sudamericana: 2020
- Campeonato Brasileiro Série A: 2019, 2020
- Copa do Brasil: 2022
- Supercopa do Brasil: 2020, 2021
- Campeonato Carioca: 2019, 2020, 2021

Bahia

- Campeonato Baiano: 2025, 2026
- Copa do Nordeste: 2025

Brazil U20

- South American U-20 Championship: 2009

Individual

- Campeonato Brasileiro Série A Best Player: 2013, 2014
- Campeonato Brasileiro Série A Team of the Year: 2013, 2014, 2019
- Campeonato Brasileiro Série A top assist provider: 2013, 2014
- Campeonato Brasileiro Série A Fan-Voted Best Player: 2019
- Bola de Ouro: 2013
- Bola de Prata: 2013
- Troféu Mesa Redonda Best Player: 2013
- Campeonato Carioca Team of the Year: 2019, 2020
- Copa Libertadores Team of the Tournament: 2019, 2022
- South American Team of the Year: 2022

== Personal life ==
Ribeiro is married to Marília Nery since 2013 and has two children. He is Roman Catholic.
