= Ryan (footballer, born 2002) =

Brazilian footballer (born 2002)

Personal information
- Full name: Ryan Carlos Santos de Sousa
- Date of birth: 14 May 2002 (age 24)
- Place of birth: Diadema, Brazil
- Height: 1.72 m (5 ft 8 in)
- Position: Left back

Team information
- Current team: Náutico
- Number: 6

Youth career
- 2015–2018: São Paulo
- 2019–2020: Ponte Preta
- 2020–2022: Bahia

Senior career*
Years	Team	Apps	(Gls)
2023–2025	Bahia	21	(0)
2024	→ CRB (loan)	21	(0)
2025	→ Chornomorets Odesa (loan)	11	(0)
2025–2026	Estrela da Amadora	4	(0)
2026	Figueirense	6	(0)
2026–	Náutico	12	(0)
- * Club domestic league appearances and goals as of 18 November 2026

Ryan Carlos Santos de Sousa (born 14 May 2002), known as Ryan Carlos or just Ryan, is a Brazilian professional footballer who plays as a left-back for Campeonato Brasileiro Série B club Náutico.

== Club career ==
Born in Diadema, São Paulo, Ryan represented São Paulo and Ponte Preta as a youth before joining Bahia's under-20 team in September 2020. Promoted to the first team ahead of the 2023 season, he made his senior debut on 11 January of that year, coming on as a second-half substitute for fellow youth graduate Matheus Bahia in a 3–1 Campeonato Baiano home win over Juazeirense.

In February 2025 Ryan went on loan to Chornomorets Odesa. He made his debut against Kolos Kovalivka on 21 February 2025.

On 13 August 2025, Ryan moved to Portugal, joining Primeira Liga club Estrela da Amadora on a three-year contract.

== Career statistics ==
As of 1 August 2024

Club	Season	League			State league (Note: Includes Campeonato Baiano)		Cup (Note: Includes Copa do Brasil.)		Continental		Other (Note: Includes Copa do Nordeste.)		Total	
Club	Season	Division	Apps	Goals	Apps	Goals	Apps	Goals	Apps	Goals	Apps	Goals	Apps	Goals
Bahia	2023	Série A	9	0	7	0	4	0	—		5 (Note: Appearance(s) in Copa do Nordeste)	0	25	0
Bahia	2024	Série A	0	0	3	0	0	0	0	0	1	0	4	0
Bahia	Total		9	0	10	0	4	0	0	0	6	0	29	0
CRB (loan)	2024	Série B	5	0	—		1	0	—		—		6	0
Career total			14	0	10	0	5	0	0	0	6	0	35	0

== Honours ==
Bahia

- Campeonato Baiano: 2023
