= Gilberto (footballer, born 1993) =

Brazilian footballer

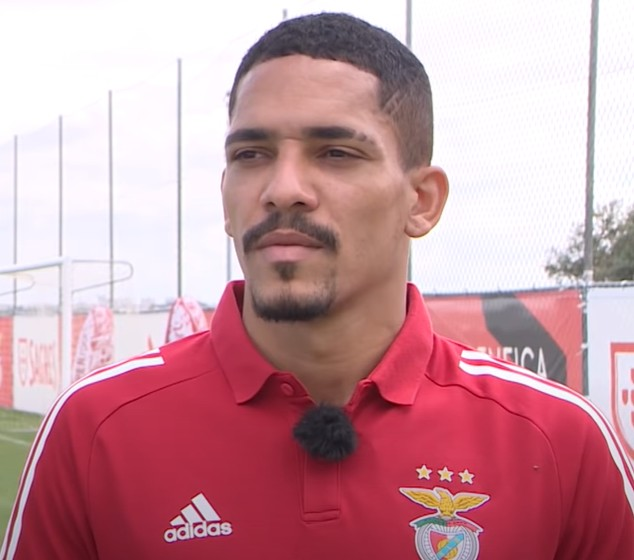
- Gilberto with Benfica in 2020

Personal information
- Full name: Gilberto Moraes Júnior
- Date of birth: 7 March 1993 (age 33)
- Place of birth: Campinas, Brazil
- Height: 1.81 m (5 ft 11 in)
- Position: Right back

Team information
- Current team: Athletico Paranaense
- Number: 12

Youth career
- CFZ do Rio
- 2010–2012: Botafogo

Senior career*
| Years | Team | Apps | (Gls) |
| 2011–2015 | Botafogo | 46 | (1) |
| 2014 | → Internacional (loan) | 23 | (1) |
| 2015–2019 | Fiorentina | 5 | (0) |
| 2016-2017 | → Hellas Verona (loan) | 5 | (0) |
| 2016-2017 | → Latina (loan) | 9 | (0) |
| 2017-2018 | → Vasco da Gama (loan) | 38 | (0) |
| 2018–2019 | → Fluminense (loan) | 77 | (8) |
| 2020-2021 | Fluminense | 13 | (3) |
| 2020–2023 | Benfica | 66 | (4) |
| 2023–2026 | Bahia | 83 | (3) |
| 2026– | Athletico Paranaense | 13 | (0) |

International career
| 2014 | Brazil U21 | 4 | (0) |
| 2015 | Brazil U23 | 4 | (0) |
Medal record
Representing Brazil
Men's Football
Pan American Games
| Bronze medal – third place | 2015 Toronto | Team competition |
- * Club domestic league appearances and goals as of 16:07, 10 November 2026 (UTC)

Gilberto Moraes Júnior (born 7 March 1993), simply known as Gilberto, is a Brazilian professional footballer who plays as a right back for Athletico Paranaense.

== Club career ==
=== Botafogo ===
Born in Campinas, São Paulo, Gilberto joined Botafogo's youth setup in 2010, from CFZ do Rio. He made his first team debut on 23 April 2011, starting in a 2–5 Campeonato Carioca loss against Boavista, as the club opted to use the under-20 squad.

Gilberto made his Série A debut on 5 September 2012, coming on as a late substitute for Márcio Azevedo in a 3–1 away win against Cruzeiro. Definitely promoted to the main squad in 2013, he spent the campaign as a third-choice behind Lucas and Edílson.

On 5 January 2014, Gilberto was loaned to fellow top tier side Internacional, for one year. He scored his first senior goal on his debut for the club on 2 February, netting his team's third in a 4–1 Campeonato Gaúcho home routing over Cruzeiro-RS.

A first-choice in the 2014 Campeonato Gaúcho, Gilberto shared the same amount of playing time with Wellington Silva and Cláudio Winck in the Série A before returning to his parent club Botafogo for the 2015 campaign.

With Fogão now in the Série B, Gilberto became an undisputed starter, and scored his first goal for the club on 11 March 2015 in a 3–0 home win against Tigres do Brasil.

=== Fiorentina ===
On 22 July 2015, Gilberto moved abroad after signing a contract with Italian Serie A side Fiorentina, for a rumoured fee of R$ 3.4 million. He made his debut abroad on 23 August, starting in a 2–0 home win against Milan.

On 1 February 2016, after featuring rarely, Gilberto was loaned to fellow Serie A side Hellas Verona until the end of the season. He moved to Serie B side Latina also in a temporary deal on 31 August, before returning to his home country with Vasco da Gama, also on loan, on 31 January 2017.

=== Fluminense ===
On 29 December 2017, Gilberto agreed to a one-year loan deal with Fluminense. His loan was renewed for a further year on 2 January 2019, and he became an undisputed starter for the club in that year.

On 26 December 2019, Fiorentina announced that 50% of Gilberto's economic rights were sold to Fluminense. He signed a contract until July 2022 with the club.

=== Benfica ===
On 8 August 2020, Gilberto agreed to a five-year deal with Portuguese Primeira Liga side S.L. Benfica. He was a regular starter for most of the campaign, but lost his starting spot to Diogo Gonçalves in May, and was subsequently deemed surplus to requirements by manager Jorge Jesus.

=== Bahia ===
On 9 July 2023, Brazilian side Bahia announced the signing of Gilberto on a contract until 31 December 2026, for a fee of €2.5 million, which could rise to €3 million with add-ons.

== International career ==
Gilberto was called up to the Brazil under-21 team for the 2014 Toulon Tournament. In the following year, he was also a part of the under-23 side which played in the Pan American Games; he featured in four matches during the competition.

== Career statistics ==
As of 10 November 2026

| Club | Season | League | | | State league (Note: Includes Campeonato Carioca, Campeonato Gaúcho, Campeonato Baiano) | | National cup (Note: Includes Copa do Brasil, Coppa Italia, Taça de Portugal) | | Continental | | Other | | Total | |
| Club | Season | Division | Apps | Goals | Apps | Goals | Apps | Goals | Apps | Goals | Apps | Goals | Apps | Goals |
|---|---|---|---|---|---|---|---|---|---|---|---|---|---|---|
| Botafogo | 2011 | Série A | 0 | 0 | 1 | 0 | 0 | 0 | — | | — | | 1 | 0 |
| Botafogo | 2012 | Série A | 2 | 0 | 0 | 0 | 0 | 0 | — | | — | | 2 | 0 |
| Botafogo | 2013 | Série A | 12 | 0 | 4 | 0 | 4 | 0 | — | | — | | 20 | 0 |
| Botafogo | 2015 | Série B | 9 | 0 | 18 | 1 | 0 | 0 | — | | — | | 27 | 1 |
| Botafogo | Total | | 23 | 0 | 23 | 1 | 4 | 0 | — | | — | | 50 | 1 |
| Internacional (loan) | 2014 | Série A | 14 | 0 | 9 | 1 | 4 | 0 | 1 (Note: Appearance(s) in Copa Sudamericana) | 0 | — | | 28 | 1 |
| Fiorentina | 2015–16 | Serie A | 5 | 0 | — | | 0 | 0 | 2 (Note: Appearances in UEFA Europa League) | 0 | — | | 7 | 0 |
| Hellas Verona (loan) | 2015–16 | Serie A | 5 | 0 | — | | — | | — | | — | | 5 | 0 |
| Latina (loan) | 2016–17 | Serie B | 9 | 0 | — | | 0 | 0 | — | | — | | 9 | 0 |
| Vasco da Gama (loan) | 2017 | Série A | 26 | 0 | 12 | 0 | 4 | 0 | — | | — | | 42 | 0 |
| Fluminense | 2018 | Série A | 15 | 3 | 12 | 1 | 4 | 2 | 3 | 0 | — | | 34 | 6 |
| Fluminense | 2019 | Série A | 31 | 0 | 6 | 1 | 7 | 1 | 5 | 0 | — | | 49 | 2 |
| Fluminense | 2020 | Série A | 0 | 0 | 13 | 3 | 3 | 0 | 2 | 0 | — | | 16 | 3 |
| Fluminense | Total | | 46 | 3 | 31 | 5 | 14 | 3 | 10 | 0 | — | | 99 | 11 |
| Benfica | 2020–21 | Primeira Liga | 25 | 0 | — | | 5 | 0 | 4 | 0 | 2 (Note: One appearance in Taça da Liga, one appearance in Supertaça Cândido de Oliveira) | 0 | 36 | 0 |
| Benfica | 2021–22 | Primeira Liga | 21 | 2 | — | | 2 | 0 | 12 (Note: Appearances in UEFA Champions League) | 2 | 0 | 0 | 35 | 4 |
| Benfica | 2022–23 | Primeira Liga | 20 | 2 | — | | 3 | 0 | 9 | 1 | 3 (Note: Appearances in Taça da Liga) | 0 | 35 | 3 |
| Benfica | Total | | 66 | 4 | — | | 10 | 0 | 25 | 3 | 5 | 0 | 106 | 7 |
| Bahia | 2023 | Série A | 21 | 1 | — | | — | | — | | — | | 21 | 1 |
| Bahia | 2024 | Série A | 19 | 1 | 8 | 0 | 0 | 0 | — | | 6 (Note: Appearance(s) in Copa do Nordeste) | 0 | 33 | 1 |
| Bahia | 2025 | Série A | 23 | 1 | 3 | 0 | 3 | 0 | 7 (Note: Appearance(s) in Copa Libertadores) | 0 | 6 | 0 | 42 | 1 |
| Bahia | 2026 | Série A | 7 | 0 | 2 | 0 | 0 | 0 | 1 | 0 | — | | 10 | 0 |
| Bahia | Total | | 70 | 3 | 13 | 0 | 3 | 0 | 8 | 0 | 12 | 0 | 106 | 3 |
| Athletico Paranaense | 2026 | Série A | 13 | 0 | — | | 2 | 0 | — | | — | | 15 | 0 |
| Career total | | | 277 | 10 | 88 | 7 | 41 | 3 | 46 | 3 | 17 | 0 | 467 | 23 |

== Honours ==
Internacional

- Campeonato Gaúcho: 2014

Fluminense

- Taça Rio: 2020

Benfica

- Primeira Liga: 2022–23

Bahia

- Campeonato Baiano: 2025, 2026

Brazil U20

- Toulon Tournament: 2014

=== Individual ===
- Campeonato Carioca Team of the Year: 2019
