= Kanu (footballer, born 1997) =

Brazilian footballer

Personal information
- Full name: Victor Hugo Soares dos Santos
- Date of birth: 7 March 1997 (age 29)
- Place of birth: Duque de Caxias, Brazil
- Height: 1.86 m (6 ft 1 in)
- Position: Centre-back

Team information
- Current team: Bahia
- Number: 4

Youth career
- 2011-2012: Flamengo
- 2013: Vasco da Gama
- 2014–2017: Botafogo

Senior career*
Years	Team	Apps	(Gls)
2018–2023	Botafogo	125	(2)
2019	→ Cabofriense (loan)	0	(0)
2023	→ Bahia (loan)	23	(0)
2023–	Bahia	78	(4)
- * Club domestic league appearances and goals as of 21:38, 10 November 2026 (UTC)

Victor Hugo Soares dos Santos (born 7 March 1997), commonly known as Kanu, is a Brazilian footballer who plays as a centre-back for Bahia.

== Career statistics ==
As of 10 November 2026.

Club	Season	League			State League (Note: Includes Campeonato Carioca, Campeonato Baiano)		Cup		Continental		Other		Total	
Club	Season	Division	Apps	Goals	Apps	Goals	Apps	Goals	Apps	Goals	Apps	Goals	Apps	Goals
Botafogo	2018	Série A	0	0	1	0	0	0	0	0	—		1	0
Botafogo	2019	Série A	3	0	0	0	0	0	—		—		3	0
Botafogo	2020	Série A	35	0	7	0	7	0	—		—		49	0
Botafogo	2021	Série B	34	0	14	0	2	0	—		—		50	0
Botafogo	2022	Série A	19	0	12	2	4	2	—		—		35	4
Botafogo	Total		91	0	34	2	13	2	0	0	—		138	4
Cabofriense (loan)	2019	Carioca	—		0	0	—		—		—		0	0
Bahia	2023	Série A	33	1	8	0	6	0	—		3 (Note: Appearance(s) in Copa do Nordeste)	0	50	1
Bahia	2024	Série A	30	0	5	1	7	0	—		8	1	50	2
Bahia	2025	Série A	7	0	6	2	0	0	6 (Note: Appearance(s) in Copa Libertadores)	0	2	0	21	2
Bahia	2026	Série A	8	0	4	0	0	0	0	0	—		12	0
Bahia	Total		78	1	23	3	13	0	6	0	13	1	133	5
Career total			169	1	57	5	26	2	6	0	13	1	271	9

== Honours ==
Botafogo

- Campeonato Brasileiro Série B: 2021

Bahia

- Campeonato Baiano: 2023, 2025, 2026
- Copa do Nordeste: 2025
