= Rezende (footballer, born 1995) =

Brazilian footballer

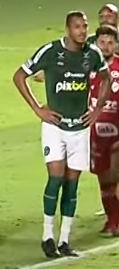
- Rezende playing for Goiás in 2021

Personal information
- Full name: Júlio César de Rezende Miranda
- Date of birth: 2 January 1995 (age 31)
- Place of birth: Rio de Janeiro, Brazil
- Height: 1.86 m (6 ft 1 in)
- Position: Defensive midfielder

Team information
- Current team: Qingdao West Coast
- Number: 23

Youth career
- 2006–2015: Madureira

Senior career*
Years	Team	Apps	(Gls)
2014–2019	Madureira	45	(3)
2017	→ Portuguesa-RJ (loan)	8	(0)
2018	→ Portuguesa-RJ (loan)	6	(0)
2020	Resende	8	(0)
2020	Treze	7	(0)
2020–2021	Azuriz	24	(2)
2021	→ Goiás (loan)	22	(2)
2022–2025	Bahia	120	(6)
2026–	Qingdao West Coast	17	(0)
- * Club domestic league appearances and goals as of 11 July 2026

Júlio César de Rezende Miranda (born Júlio César Gomes da Silva; 2 January 1995), commonly known as Rezende, is a Brazilian footballer who plays as a defensive midfielder for Qingdao West Coast.

== Club career ==
Born in Rio de Janeiro, Rezende was a Madureira youth graduate. He made his first team debut on 27 August 2014, starting in a 2–0 away win over Campo Grande, for the year's Copa Rio.

Rezende scored his first senior goal on 17 April 2016, netting the opener in a 1–1 Campeonato Carioca home draw against Volta Redonda. Regularly used by Madura, he was loaned to Portuguesa-RJ in April 2017.

Rezende returned to Madureira for the 2018 season, but was again loaned to Portuguesa on 18 April 2019. On 11 November of that year, he joined Resende.

In July 2020, Rezende signed for Treze, but finished the season winning the Campeonato Paranaense Série Prata with Azuriz. On 7 June 2021, he was presented at Série B side Goiás, on loan from Azuriz.

Despite being a regular starter in Goiás' promotion to the Série A, Rezende left the club on 10 December 2021, after failing to agree a permanent contract. Eleven days later, he signed a two-year deal with Bahia, also helping in a top tier promotion at the end of the season.

On 27 February 2026, Rezende moved to China and joined Chinese Super League club Qingdao West Coast.

== Personal life ==
Rezende was raised by his aunt Estela, after her sister thought about aborting him. He was later adopted by Estela and her husband, changing his surname from Gomes da Silva to de Rezende Miranda. His adoptive father died in 2020.

== Career statistics ==
As of match played 11 July 2026

Appearances and goals by club, season and competition
Club	Season	League			State League		Cup		Continental		Other		Total	
Club	Season	Division	Apps	Goals	Apps	Goals	Apps	Goals	Apps	Goals	Apps	Goals	Apps	Goals
Madureira	2014	Série C	1	0	0	0	—		—		7 (Note: Appearance(s) in Copa Rio)	0	8	0
Madureira	2015	Série C	0	0	0	0	—		—		9	1	9	1
Madureira	2016	Série D	6	0	9	1	—		—		6	0	21	1
Madureira	2017	Carioca	—		11	1	—		—		—		11	1
Madureira	2018	Série D	3	0	8	0	1	0	—		1	0	13	0
Madureira	2019	Carioca	—		7	1	—		—		1	0	8	1
Madureira	Total		10	0	35	3	1	0	—		24	1	70	4
Portuguesa-RJ (loan)	2017	Série D	8	0	—		—		—		3	0	11	0
Portuguesa-RJ (loan)	2018	Série D	6	0	—		—		—		—		6	0
Resende	2020	Carioca	—		8	0	—		—		—		8	0
Treze	2020	Série C	4	0	3	0	—		—		—		7	0
Azuriz	2020	Paranaense Série Prata	—		11	1	—		—		—		11	1
Azuriz	2021	Paranaense	—		13	1	—		—		—		13	1
Azuriz	Total		—		24	2	—		—		—		24	2
Goiás (loan)	2021	Série B	22	2	—		—		—		—		22	2
Bahia	2022	Série B	28	1	6	0	3	0	—		7 (Note: Appearance(s) in Copa do Nordeste)	0	44	1
Bahia	2023	Série A	33	2	9	2	8	0	—		3	0	53	4
Bahia	2024	Série A	18	0	6	1	5	0	—		5	0	34	1
Bahia	2025	Série A	11	0	5	0	4	0	0	0	5	2	25	2
Bahia	2026	Série A	0	0	4	0	—		—		—		4	0
Bahia	Total		90	3	30	3	20	0	0	0	20	2	160	8
Qingdao West Coast	2026	Chinese Super League	17	0	—		0	0	—		—		17	0
Career total			157	5	100	8	21	0	0	0	47	2	325	16

== Honours ==
Treze

- Campeonato Paraibano: 2020

Azuriz

- Campeonato Paranaense Série Prata: 2020

Bahia

- Campeonato Baiano: 2023, 2025
