= Porto Sport Club =

Brazilian association football club

Porto-BA
- Full name: Porto Sport Club
- Nickname: Avante Porto
- Founded: 2 February 2024; 2 years ago
- Ground: Agnaldo Bento
- Capacity: 5,000
- President: André Santos
- Head coach: Sandro Duarte
- League: Campeonato Brasileiro Série D Campeonato Baiano
- 2025: Baiano, 5th of 10
Home colours	Away colours

Porto Sport Club, generally known as Porto-BA, is a Brazilian football club from Porto Seguro, Bahia. It competes in the Campeonato Baiano, the top tier of the Bahia state football league.

== History ==
After an amateur XI from the city of Porto Seguro reached the final of the Campeonato Baiano Intermunicipal, André Santos "Negão" started a project to create a professional club in the city, with their official foundation date being set on 2 February 2024, the day of their affiliation to the Federação Bahiana de Futebol. Registered in the 2024 Campeonato Baiano Second Division, the club played their first official match on 8 June, a 0–0 away draw against SSA FC.

After defeating Fluminense de Feira in the semifinals, Porto achieved a first-ever promotion to the Campeonato Baiano, but lost the finals to Colo Colo. During the 2025 Baiano, the club finished fifth in the competition and qualified to the 2026 Campeonato Brasileiro Série D.

== Honours ==
=== Runners-up ===
- Campeonato Baiano Second Division (1): 2024
