= 2025 Campeonato Baiano =

Campeonato Baiano
- Season: 2025
- Dates: 11 January – 23 March 2025
- Champions: Bahia
- Relegated: Jacobina; Colo Colo
- Matches: 50
- Goals: 116 (2.32 per match)

The 2025 Campeonato Baiano is the 121st edition of Bahia's top professional football league organized by FBF. The competition began on 11 January and is scheduled to conclude on 7 April 2025. Vitória were the defending champions.

== Format ==
In the first stage, each team played the other nine teams in a single round-robin tournament. Top four teams advanced to the semi-finals. The bottom two teams were relegated to the 2026 Campeonato Baiano Second Division.

The final stage was played on a home-and-away two-legged basis with the best overall performance team hosting the second leg. If tied on aggregate, the penalty shoot-out would be used to determine the winners.

== Teams ==
Club	Home City	Manager	2024 Result
Alagoinhas Atlético Clube (Atlético de Alagoinhas)	Alagoinhas		7th
Esporte Clube Bahia	Salvador	Rogério Ceni	2nd
Barcelona Futebol Clube (Barcelona de Ilhéus)	Ilhéus		3rd
Colo Colo de Futebol e Regatas	Ilhéus		1st (Second Division)
Esporte Clube Jacuipense	Riachão do Jacuípe	Jonilson Veloso	8th
Sociedade Desportiva Juazeirense	Juazeiro	Aroldo Moreira	5th
Associação Desportiva Jequié	Jequié	Eduardo Bahia	4th
Jacobina Esporte Clube	Jacobina	Laécio Aquino	6th
Porto Sport Club	Porto Seguro	Sandro Duarte	2nd (Second Division)
Esporte Clube Vitória	Salvador	Thiago Carpini	1st

== First stage ==
Pos	Team	Pld	W	D	L	GF	GA	GD	Pts	Qualification or relegation
1	Vitória	9	6	3	0	18	4	+14	21	Advance to Semi-final stage
2	Jacuipense	9	5	4	0	14	4	+10	19	Advance to Semi-final stage
3	Bahia	9	5	3	1	15	3	+12	18	Advance to Semi-final stage
4	Atlético de Alagoinhas	9	3	4	2	9	6	+3	13	Advance to Semi-final stage
5	Porto	9	3	2	4	9	13	−4	11	
6	Juazeirense	9	3	1	5	8	12	−4	10	
7	Jequié	9	2	3	4	7	10	−3	9	
8	Barcelona de Ilhéus	9	1	6	2	7	8	−1	9	
9	Jacobina	8	0	3	5	4	16	−12	3	Relegation to 2026 Campeonato Baiano Second Division
10	Colo Colo	8	0	3	5	6	21	−15	3	Relegation to 2026 Campeonato Baiano Second Division

Updated to match(es) played on 24 February 2025. Source: FBF
Rules for classification: 1) Points; 2) Wins; 3) Goal difference; 4) Goals scored; 5) Head-to-head result; 6) Fewest red cards; 7) Fewest yellow cards; 8) Draw.

== Final Stage ==
=== Bracket ===
Semi-finals
3	Bahia	1	5	6
2	Jacuipense	2	0	2
4	Atlético de Alagoinhas	0	0	0
1	Vitória	4	3	7

Finals
3	Bahia	2	1	3
1	Vitória	0	1	1

=== Semi-finals ===
Team 1	Agg.	Team 2	1st leg	2nd leg
Atlético de Alagoinhas	0–7	Vitória	0–4	0–3
Bahia	6–2	Jacuipense	1–2	5–0

==== Group 2 ====
1 March 2025
18:30

Atlético de Alagoinhas	0–4	Vitória
		Lucas Halter 14'; Lucas Braga 45+5'; Jamerson 67'; Gustavo Silva 78'

Estádio Municipal Antônio de Figueiredo, Alagoinhas
Referee: Wagner Francisco Silva Souza

8 March 2025
18:00

Vitória	3–0	Atlético de Alagoinhas
Janderson 53'; Thiaguinho 59'; Carlinhos 70'

Barradão, Salvador

==== Group 3 ====
1 March 2025
16:00

Bahia	1–2	Jacuipense
Acevedo 35'		Alison Daniel 48'; Vinícius Amaral 55'

Arena Fonte Nova, Salvador
Referee: Josue Reis de Jesus Junior

9 March 2025
18:00

Jacuipense	0–5	Bahia
		Nestor 12'; Arias 27'; Cauly 69'; Éverton Ribeiro 80'; Erick 85'

Estádio Joia da Princesa, Feira de Santana

=== Finals ===
Team 1	Agg.	Team 2	1st leg	2nd leg
Bahia	3–1	Vitória	2–0	1–1

==== Group 4 ====
16 March 2025
18:00

Bahia	2–0	Vitória
Xavier 7'; Pulga 45+2'	Report

Arena Fonte Nova, Salvador
Attendance: 42,384
Referee: Rafael Rodrigo Klein

Bahia	Vitória

GK	22	(Brazil) Marcos Felipe
RB	13	(Colombia) Arias
CB	21	(Argentina) Ramos
CB	3	(Brazil) Gabriel Xavier
LB	4	(Brazil) Kanu	(yellow card) 58'
DM	6	(Brazil) Jean Lucas		(substituted off) 70'
MF	19	(Brazil) Caio Alexandre		(substituted off) 76'
MF	8	(Brazil) Cauly		(substituted off) 80'
AM	10	(Brazil) Éverton Ribeiro (c)		(substituted off) 70'
FW	9	(Uruguay) Rodríguez	(yellow card) 43'
FW	16	(Brazil) Erick Pulga		(substituted off) 70'
Substitutes:
GK	1	(Brazil) Danilo Fernandes
DF	33	(Brazil) David Duarte
DF	2	(Brazil) Gilberto
DF	25	(Brazil) Iago
MF	14	(Brazil) Erick		(substituted on) 70'
MF	46	(Brazil) Luciano Juba		(substituted on) 70'
MF	15	(Uruguay) Araújo		(substituted on) 80'
MF	26	(Uruguay) Acevedo		(substituted on) 76'
MF	5	(Brazil) Rezende
MF	11	(Brazil) Rodrigo Nestor		(substituted on) 70'
FW	12	(Brazil) Willian José
FW	37	(Brazil) Kayky
Coach:
(Brazil) Rogério Ceni

GK	1	(Brazil) Lucas Arcanjo
RB	27	(Paraguay) Raúl Cáceres
CB	5	(Brazil) Lucas Halter	(yellow card) 43'
CB	77	(Brazil) Neris		(substituted off) 54'
CB	43	(Brazil) Edu
LB	88	(Brazil) Emerson Buiú
DM	29	(Brazil) Willian Oliveira		(substituted off) 80'
CM	44	(Brazil) Gabriel Baralhas
AM	10	(Brazil) Wellington Rato	(yellow card) 24'	(substituted off) 46'
FW	23	(Brazil) Fabrício		(substituted off) 54'
FW	39	(Brazil) Janderson		(substituted off) 80'
Substitutes:
GK	21	(Brazil) Gabriel
DF	3	(Brazil) Zé Marcos
DF	13	(Brazil) Camutanga
DF	16	(Brazil) Hugo
MF	8	(Brazil) Ronald		(substituted on) 54'
MF	17	(Brazil) Thiaguinho
MF	37	(Brazil) Bruno Xavier
FW	7	(Brazil) Gustavo Silva		(substituted on) 46'
FW	11	(Brazil) Osvaldo	(yellow card) 81'	(substituted on) 80'
FW	22	(Brazil) Lucas Braga		(substituted on) 54'
FW	96	(Brazil) Carlos Eduardo
FW	99	(Brazil) Carlinhos	(yellow card) 90+5'	(substituted on) 80'
Coach:
(Brazil) Thiago Carpini

Assistant referees:
Bruno Boschilia
Guilherme Dias Camilo

23 March 2025
16:00

Vitória	1–1	Bahia
Claudinho 84'	Report	Kayky 90+18'

Barradão, Salvador
Referee: Wilton Pereira Sampaio

Vitória	Bahia

GK	1	(Brazil) Lucas Arcanjo	(yellow card) 90+13'
RB	27	(Paraguay) Raúl Cáceres	(yellow card) 45'	(substituted off) 46'
CB	5	(Brazil) Lucas Halter
CB	77	(Brazil) Neris
LB	83	(Brazil) Jamerson Bahia		(substituted off) 80'
CM	44	(Brazil) Gabriel Baralhas	(yellow card) 90+13'
MF	28	(Brazil) Ricardo Ryller		(substituted off) 66'
AM	10	(Brazil) Wellington Rato	(yellow card) 39'	(substituted off) 54'
AM	8	(Brazil) Ronald		(substituted off) 80'
FW	30	(Brazil) Matheuzinho	(yellow card) 36'
FW	39	(Brazil) Janderson
Substitutes:
GK	21	(Brazil) Gabriel
DF	2	(Brazil) Claudinho		(substituted on) 46'
DF	3	(Brazil) Zé Marcos	(red card) 90+10'
DF	16	(Brazil) Hugo		(substituted on) 80'
DF	43	(Brazil) Edu
MF	17	(Brazil) Thiaguinho
MF	29	(Brazil) Willian Oliveira
FW	7	(Brazil) Gustavo Silva		(substituted on) 66'
FW	22	(Brazil) Lucas Braga
FW	23	(Brazil) Fabrício		(substituted on) 54'
FW	96	(Brazil) Carlos Eduardo
FW	99	(Brazil) Carlinhos		(substituted on) 80'
Coach:
(Brazil) Thiago Carpini

GK	22	(Brazil) Marcos Felipe
CB	21	(Argentina) Ramos	(yellow card) 76'
CB	3	(Brazil) Gabriel Xavier	(yellow card) 33'
LB	4	(Brazil) Kanu	(yellow card) 65'
DM	6	(Brazil) Jean Lucas
MF	19	(Brazil) Caio Alexandre	(yellow card) 17' (red card) 90+10'	(substituted off) 61'
MF	46	(Brazil) Luciano Juba
AM	10	(Brazil) Éverton Ribeiro (c)		(substituted off) 61'
FW	7	(Brazil) Ademir		(substituted off) 46'
FW	12	(Brazil) Willian José		(substituted off) 66'
FW	16	(Brazil) Erick Pulga		(substituted off) 75'
Substitutes:
GK	1	(Brazil) Danilo Fernandes	(red card) 90+9'
DF	33	(Brazil) David Duarte
DF	2	(Brazil) Gilberto		(substituted on) 46'
DF	25	(Brazil) Iago
MF	8	(Brazil) Cauly	(red card) 90+3'	(substituted on) 66'
MF	14	(Brazil) Erick		(substituted on) 61'
MF	26	(Uruguay) Acevedo		(substituted on) 61'
MF	5	(Brazil) Rezende
MF	11	(Brazil) Rodrigo Nestor
MF	20	(Brazil) Yago Felipe
FW	37	(Brazil) Kayky		(substituted on) 75'
FW	77	(Brazil) Tiago
Coach:
(Brazil) Rogério Ceni

Assistant referees:
Rodrigo Figueiredo Henrique Correa
Nailton Junior de Sousa Oliveira
Fourth official:
Wagner do Nascimento Magalhães
Video assistant referee:
Marco Aurelio Augusto Fazekas Ferreira
