= Santiago Ramos Mingo =

Argentine footballer (born 2001)

Santi Ramos
Personal information
- Full name: Santiago Ramos Mingo
- Date of birth: 6 February 2001 (age 25)
- Place of birth: Tucumán, Argentina
- Height: 1.86 m (6 ft 1 in)
- Position: Centre back

Team information
- Current team: América
- Number: 15

Youth career
- 2018–2020: Boca Juniors

Senior career*
Years	Team	Apps	(Gls)
2020–2022	Barcelona B	35	(1)
2022–2023	OH Leuven	0	(0)
2022	OH Leuven U23	18	(3)
2023	→ Defensa y Justicia (loan)	23	(0)
2024–2025	Defensa y Justicia	36	(4)
2025–2026	Bahia	48	(0)
2026–	América	0	(0)
- * Club domestic league appearances and goals as of 7 April 2026

Santiago Ramos Mingo (born 21 November 2001) is an Argentine professional footballer who plays as a centre-back for Liga MX club América.

== Career ==
Before the second half of 2019–20, Mingo signed for Spanish La Liga side Barcelona. In 2022, he signed for OH Leuven in Belgium but he never featured in the first team and instead only played for the U23 team playing at the third level, where he gained 18 caps and scored 3 goals. In early 2023, OH Leuven loaned Ramos Mingo to Defensa y Justicia for the remainder of 2023, with an option to buy. In January 2025, Bahia signed Ramos Mingo for $4.5m.
