= Camacan =

Municipality in Bahia, Brazil

- Municipality
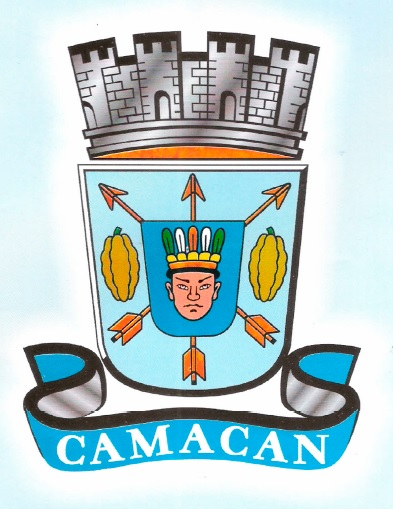
- Flag Coat of arms

- Location in Brazil
- Coordinates: 15°25′08″S 39°29′45″W
- Country: Brazil
- Region: Nordeste
- State: Bahia

Population (2020)
  - Total: 32,006
- Time zone: UTC−3 (BRT)

Camacan is a municipality in the state of Bahia in the North-East region of Brazil.

== See also ==
- List of municipalities in Bahia
- Kamakã language
