= 2024 Esporte Clube Bahia season =

Esporte Clube Bahia
2024 season
- Manager: Rogério Ceni
- Stadium: Casa de Apostas Arena Fonte Nova
- Série A: 8th
- Campeonato Baiano: Runners-up
- Copa do Brasil: Quarterfinals
- Copa do Nordeste: Semi-finals
- Top goalscorer: League: Everaldo (5); All: Everaldo (8)
- Average home league attendance: 36,168
Home colours	Away colours	Third colours

The 2024 season was the 93rd season in the history of Esporte Clube Bahia and the second consecutive season in the top division. They played in the Série A and the Campeonato Baiano

== Transfers ==
=== In ===
Pos.	Player	Transferred from	Fee	Date	Source
DF	(Brazil) Iago	(Germany) FC Augsburg	Free	10 July 2024	

=== Out ===
Pos.	Player	Transferred to	Fee	Date	Source
DF	(Ecuador) Jhoanner Chávez	(France) RC Lens	€4,500,000	1 July 2024	

== Competitions ==
=== Overall record ===
Competition	First match	Last match	Starting round	Final position	Record							
Competition	First match	Last match	Starting round	Final position	Pld	W	D	L	GF	GA	GD	Win %
Série A	14 April 2024	8 December 2024	Matchday 1	8th	38	15	8	15	49	49	+0	39.47
Campeonato Baiano	17 January 2024	7 April 2024	First Stage	Runners-up	13	8	2	3	32	12	+20	61.54
Copa do Brasil	22 February 2024	12 September	Second Round	Quarter-Final	8	4	2	2	11	5	+6	50.00
Copa do Nordeste	4 February 2024	26 May 2024	Group Stage	Semi-finals	10	7	1	2	14	8	+6	70.00
Total					69	34	13	22	106	74	+32	49.28

Last updated: 26 June 2024
Source: Soccerway

=== Série A ===
==== League table ====
Pos	Team	Pld	W	D	L	GF	GA	GD	Pts	Qualification or relegation
6	São Paulo	38	17	8	13	53	43	+10	59	Qualification for Copa Libertadores group stage (Note: Botafogo and Flamengo qualified for the Copa Libertadores group stage by winning the 2024 Copa Libertadores and the 2024 Copa do Brasil, respectively.)
7	Corinthians	38	15	11	12	54	45	+9	56	Qualification for Copa Libertadores second stage
8	Bahia	38	15	8	15	49	49	0	53	Qualification for Copa Libertadores second stage
9	Cruzeiro	38	14	10	14	43	41	+2	52	Qualification for Copa Sudamericana group stage
10	Vasco da Gama	38	14	8	16	43	56	−13	50	Qualification for Copa Sudamericana group stage

Source: CBF
Rules for classification: 1) points; 2) wins; 3) goal difference; 4) goals scored; 5) head-to-head results (only between two teams); 6) fewest red cards; 7) fewest yellow cards; 8) drawing of lots.

==== Results by round ====
Round	1	2	3	4	5	6	7	8	9	10	11	12	13	14	15	16	17	18	19	20	21	22	23	24	25	26	27	28	29	30	31	32	33	34	35	36	37	38
Ground	A	H	A	H	A	H	A	H	A	A	H	H	A	H	A	A	H	H	A	H	A	H	A	H	A	H	A	H	H	A	A	H	A	H	H	A	A	H
Result	L	W	D	W	W	W	D	W	D	L	W	W	L	W	L	W	L	L	D	D	L	W	W	D	L	W	L	W	L	D	L	L	L	L	D	W	L	W
Position																																						

Updated to match(es) played on 22 June 2024. Source:
A = Away; H = Home; W = Win; D = Draw; L = Loss

==== Matches ====
The match schedule was released on 29 February.

13 April 2024 1	Internacional	2–1	Bahia	Porto Alegre
18:30 UTC−3	Wesley 73'; Fernando 83'	Report	Teixeira 70'	Stadium: Estádio Beira-Rio; Attendance: 28,511; Referee: Rodrigo José Pereira de Lima

16 April 2024 2	Bahia	2–1	Fluminense	Salvador
21:30 UTC−3	Alexandre 35'; Souza 62'	Report	Cano 4'	Stadium: Casa de Apostas Arena Fonte Nova; Attendance: 22,893; Referee: João Vitor Gobi

21 April 2024 3	Vitória	2–2	Bahia	Salvador
16:00 UTC−3	Matheusinho 20'; Leonardo 57'	Report	Teixeira 69'	Stadium: Barradão; Attendance: 27,396; Referee: Raphael Claus

27 April 2024 4	Bahia	1–0	Grêmio	Salvador
21:00 UTC−3	Everaldo 17'	Report	Costa (red card) 90+2'; Fernandes (red card) 90+8'	Stadium: Casa de Apostas Arena Fonte Nova; Attendance: 35,836; Referee: Braulio da Silva Machado

5 May 2024 5	Botafogo	1–2	Bahia	Rio de Janeiro
18:30 UTC−3	Jeffinho 64'	Report	Everaldo 45+3' (pen.); Ratão 87'	Stadium: Estádio Nilton Santos; Attendance: 22,685; Referee: Rafael Rodrigo Klein

12 May 2024 6	Bahia	1–0	Red Bull Bragantino	Salvador
18:30 UTC−3				Stadium: Casa de Apostas Arena Fonte Nova; Referee: Gustavo Ervino Bauermann

2 June 2024 7	Atlético Mineiro	1–1	Bahia	Belo Horizonte
16:00 UTC−3				Stadium: Arena MRV; Referee: Bruno Arleu de Araújo

13 June 2024 8	Bahia	4–1	Fortaleza	Salvador
21:30 UTC−3				Stadium: Casa de Apostas Arena Fonte Nova; Referee: Felipe Fernandes de Lima

16 June 2024 9	Criciúma	2–2	Bahia	Criciúma
18:30 UTC−3				Stadium: Estádio Heriberto Hülse; Referee: Flavio Rodrigues de Souza

20 June 2024 10	Flamengo	2–1	Bahia	Rio de Janeiro
20:00 UTC−3	Gerson 24'; David Luiz 90+4'		Everaldo Stum 35'	Stadium: Maracanã; Referee: Bráulio da Silva Machado

23 June 2024 11	Bahia	4–1	Cruzeiro	Salvador
16:00 UTC−3	Thaciano 45+9'; Estupiñán 78', 90+7'; Gabriel Teixeira 90+1'		Veron 14'; Xavier (red card) 70'	Stadium: Casa de Apostas Arena Fonte Nova

26 June 2024 12	Bahia	2–1	Vasco da Gama	Salvador
20:30 UTC−3	Thaciano 7'; Óscar Estupiñán 85'		Paulo 20'; David (yellow card) 38' (yellow-red card) 59'	Stadium: Casa de Apostas Arena Fonte Nova

30 June 2024 13	São Paulo	3–1	Bahia	São Paulo
16:00 UTC−3	Calleri 30'; Ferreira 33'; Luciano 65'	Report	Junior 49'	Stadium: Estádio do Morumbi; Attendance: 49,037; Referee: Marcelo de Lima Henrique

4 July 2024 14	Bahia	2–0	Juventude	Salvador
				Stadium: Casa de Apostas Arena Fonte Nova

7 July 2024 15	Palmeiras	2–0	Bahia	São Paulo
18:30 UTC−3	Estêvão 45+3'; Rony 61', (yellow card) 62'	Report	Kanu (yellow card) 18'	Stadium: Allianz Parque; Attendance: 40,198; Referee: Jonathan Benkenstein Pinheiro (Rio Grande do Sul)

10 July 2024 16	Athletico Paranaense	1–3	Bahia	Curitiba, Paraná
	Di Yorio 60'; Fernandinho (yellow card) 35'; Thiago Heleno (yellow card) 48'	Report	Everaldo 54', (yellow card) 40'; Biel 60'; Luciano Juba 77'; Marcos Victor (yellow card) 78'; Danilo Fernandes (yellow card) 78'; Rezende (yellow card) 90+5'	Stadium: Ligga Arena; Attendance: 23,307; Referee: Felipe Fernandes de Lima

13 July 2024 17	Bahia	1–2	Cuiabá	Salvador
				Stadium: Casa de Apostas Arena Fonte Nova

21 July 2024 18	Bahia	0–1	Corinthians	Salvador
16:00 UTC−3		Report	Romero 37'	Stadium: Casa de Apostas Arena Fonte Nova; Attendance: 48,346; Referee: Felipe Fernandes de Lima

24 July 2024 19	Atlético Goianiense	1–1	Bahia	Goiânia
				Stadium: Estádio Serra Dourada

27 July 2024 20	Bahia	1–1	Internacional	Salvador
				Stadium: Casa de Apostas Arena Fonte Nova

4 August 2024 21	Fluminense	1–0	Bahia	Rio de Janeiro
	Kauã Elias 45'	Report		Stadium: Maracanã; Attendance: 50,262; Referee: Davi Lacerda

11 August 2024 22	Bahia	2–0	Vitória	Salvador
	Éverton Ribeiro 15'; Luciano Juba 90+7'			Stadium: Casa de Apostas Arena Fonte Nova

17 August 2024 23	Grêmio	0–2	Bahia	Caxias do Sul
		Report	Thaciano 45', 76'	Stadium: Estádio Alfredo Jaconi; Attendance: 17,102; Referee: Matheus Delgado Candançan

25 August 2024 24	Bahia	0–0	Botafogo	Salvador
16:00 UTC−3				Stadium: Casa de Apostas Arena Fonte Nova; Attendance: 39,625; Referee: Ramon Abatti

1 September 2024 25	Bragantino	2–1	Bahia	Bragança Paulista
				Stadium: Estádio Nabi Abi Chedid

15 September 2024 26	Bahia	3–0	Atlético Mineiro	Salvador
18:30 UTC−3	Everaldo 51'; Éverton Ribeiro 58'; Luciano Rodríguez 90+2'	Report		Stadium: Casa de Apostas Arena Fonte Nova; Attendance: 26,648; Referee: Rafael Rodrigo Klein

21 September 2024 27	Fortaleza	4–1	Bahia	Fortaleza
	Marinho 28', 38'; Pochettino 80'; Kayzer 89'		Everaldo 30'	Stadium: Castelão; Attendance: 42,051

29 September 2024 28	Bahia	1–0	Criciúma	Salvador
	Cauly 33'			Stadium: Casa de Apostas Arena Fonte Nova

5 October 2024 29	Bahia	0–2	Flamengo	Salvador
16:30 UTC−3		Report	Ayrton Lucas 35'; Alcaraz 90+12' (pen.)	Stadium: Casa de Apostas Arena Fonte Nova; Attendance: 43,433; Referee: Rafael Rodrigo Klein

18 October 2024 30	Cruzeiro	1–1	Bahia	Belo Horizonte
21:30 UTC−3	Gabriel Veron 61'	Report	Luciano Rodríguez 82'	Stadium: Mineirão; Attendance: 34,473; Referee: Flávio Rodrigues de Souza

28 October 2024 31	Vasco da Gama	3–2	Bahia	Rio de Janeiro
				Stadium: São Januário

5 November 2024 32	Bahia	0–3	São Paulo	Salvador
21:30 UTC−3		Report	Luiz Gustavo 41'; Wellington Rato 66'; Lucas Moura 90+1'	Stadium: Casa de Apostas Arena Fonte Nova; Attendance: 29,736; Referee: Alex Gomes Stefano

9 November 2024 33	Juventude	2–1	Bahia	Caxias do Sul
				Stadium: Estádio Alfredo Jaconi

20 November 2024 34	Bahia	1–2	Palmeiras	Salvador
18:00 UTC−3	Rodríguez 27'	Report	Raphael Veiga 41'; López 89'	Stadium: Casa de Apostas Arena Fonte Nova; Attendance: 35,993; Referee: Wagner do Nascimento Magalhães

24 November 2024 35	Bahia	1–1	Athletico Paranaense	Salvador
	Biel 90+4'		Nikau 63'	Stadium: Casa de Apostas Arena Fonte Nova; Attendance: 25,768; Referee: Rodrigo José Pereira de Lima

30 November 2024 36	Cuiabá	1–2	Bahia	Cuiabá
	Eliel		Ademir 37'; Luciano Rodríguez 84'	Stadium: Arena Pantanal; Attendance: 2,613; Referee: Davi Lacerda

3 December 2024 37	Corinthians	3–0	Bahia	São Paulo
20:00 UTC−3	Depay 12', 61'; Yuri Alberto 45+4'	Report		Stadium: Neo Química Arena; Attendance: 46,263; Referee: Bruno Arleu de Araújo

8 December 2024 38	Bahia	2–0	Atlético Goianiense	Salvador
	Thaciano 41'; Luciano Rodríguez 63' (pen.)			Stadium: Casa de Apostas Arena Fonte Nova; Attendance: 48,476; Referee: Gustavo Ervino Bauermann

=== Copa do Brasil ===
==== First round ====
21 February 2024	Moto Club	0–4	Bahia	São Luís
20:00 (UTC-3)		Report	Óscar Estupiñán 41'; Jean Lucas 51'; Cauly 55'; Rafael Ratão 90+2'	Stadium: Estádio Nhozinho Santos; Attendance: 1,388; Referee: Marcelo de Lima Henrique (Rio de Janeiro)

==== Second round ====
12 March 2024	Caxias	2–2 (5–6 p)	Bahia	Caxias do Sul
21:30 (UTC-3)	Cauly 19'; Thaciano 39'	Report	Caio Alexandre 4' (o.g.); Robinho 88'	Stadium: Estádio Centenário; Referee: Flavio Rodrigues de Souza (São Paulo)
	Penalties
	Marcelo Ferreira (penalty missed); Robinho (penalty missed); Dudu Mandai (penalty scored); Vitor Feijão (penalty scored); Álvaro (penalty scored); David Lustosa (penalty scored); Pedro Cuiabá (penalty scored); Denílson (penalty missed)		(penalty scored) Everaldo; (penalty missed) Santiago Arias; (penalty scored) Luciano Juba; (penalty missed) Yago Felipe; (penalty scored) Cauly; (penalty scored) Biel; (penalty scored) Everton Ribeiro; (penalty scored) Víctor Cuesta

==== Third round ====
30 April 2024 First Leg	Bahia	1–0	Criciúma	Salvador
19:00 (UTC-3)	Thaciano 56'	Report		Stadium: Arena Fonte Nova; Attendance: 37,578; Referee: Marcelo de Lima Henrique

23 May 2024 Second Leg	Criciúma	0–2 (0–3 agg.)	Bahia	Criciúma
19:00 (UTC-3)		Report	Carlos de Pena 87'; Jean Lucas 90+3'	Stadium: Heriberto Hülse; Attendance: 14,316; Referee: Raphael Claus

==== Round of 16 ====
30 July 2024 First Leg	Botafogo	1–1	Bahia	Rio de Janeiro
21:30 (UTC-3)	Carlos Alberto 8'	Report	Cauly 45+1'	Stadium: Estádio Nilton Santos; Attendance: 19,121; Referee: Flavio Rodrigues de Souza

7 August 2024 Second Leg	Bahia	1–0 (2–1 agg.)	Botafogo	Salvador
19:00 (UTC-3)	Rodríguez 87'	Report		Stadium: Arena Fonte Nova; Attendance: 36,812; Referee: Rafael Rodrigo Klein

==== Quarterfinals ====
28 August 2024 First leg	Bahia	0–1	Flamengo	Salvador
21:30 UTC−3		Report	Bruno Henrique 50'	Stadium: Casa de Apostas Arena Fonte Nova; Attendance: 46,534; Referee: Raphael Claus

12 September 2024 Second leg	Flamengo	1–0 (2–0 agg.)	Bahia	Rio de Janeiro
21:45 UTC−3	de Arrascaeta 54'	Report		Stadium: Maracanã; Attendance: 65,662; Referee: Bráulio da Silva Machado

=== Copa do Nordeste ===
==== Group stage ====
4 February 2024 1	Bahia	2–1	Sport Recife	Salvador
16:00 (UTC-3)	Thaciano 18'; Rafael Ratão 90+6'	Report	Gustavo Coutinho 73'	Stadium: Arena Fonte Nova; Attendance: 47,138; Referee: Paulo José Souza Mourão

10 February 2024 2	River	1–0	Bahia	Teresina
16:00 (UTC-3)	Crislan 6'	Report		Stadium: Albertão; Referee: Denis da Silva Ribeiro Serafim

15 February 2024 3	Bahia	3–0	América RN	Salvador
20:00 (UTC-3)	Arias 23'; Caio Alexandre 33'; Ademir 59'	Report		Stadium: Arena Fonte Nova; Attendance: 26,398; Referee: Rodrigo Jose Pereira de Lima

28 February 2024 4	CRB	0–1	Bahia	Maceió
21:30 (UTC-3)		Report	Thaciano 45+2'	Stadium: Estádio Rei Pelé; Referee: Caio Max Augusto Vieira

6 March 2024 5	Ceará	1–2	Bahia	Fortaleza
21:30 (UTC-3)	Erick Pulga 10'	Report	Everaldo 37'; Thaciano 84'	Stadium: Castelão; Attendance: 21,051; Referee: Afro Rocha de Carvalho Filho

20 March 2024 6	Bahia	2–1	Vitória	Salvador
21:30 (UTC-3)	Jean Lucas 35'; Kanu 45+3'	Report	Alerrandro 9'; Mateus Gonçalves (red card) 66'	Stadium: Arena Fonte Nova; Attendance: 48,421; Referee: Rodrigo José Pereira de Lima

24 March 2024 7	Bahia	1–0	Maranhão	Salvador
16:00 (UTC-3)	Pedro Gustavo 61' (o.g.)	Report		Stadium: Arena Fonte Nova; Attendance: 23,438; Referee: Jose Magno Teixeira Nascimento

27 March 2024 8	Botafogo PB	4–0	Bahia	João Pessoa
21:30 (UTC-3)	Pipico 54'; Pedro Ivo 57'; Bruno Mota 79', 90+6' (pen.)	Report		Stadium: Almeidão; Attendance: 3,483; Referee: Antonio Dib Moraes de Sousa

==== Final stages ====
10 April 2024 Quarterfinals	Bahia	3–0	Náutico	Salvador
21:30 (UTC-3)	Thaciano 65'; Estupiñán 79'; Jean Lucas 87'	Report		Stadium: Arena Fonte Nova; Attendance: 22,671; Referee: Paulo José Souza Mourão

26 May 2024 Semi-finals	Bahia	0–0 (7–8 p)	CRB	Salvador
18:00 (UTC-3)		Report		Stadium: Arena Fonte Nova; Attendance: 44,145; Referee: Fabio Augusto Santos Sá Junior
	Penalties
	Everaldo (penalty scored); Estupiñán (penalty scored); Luciano Juba (penalty scored); Cauly (penalty scored); Jean Lucas (penalty scored); Biel (penalty scored); Ademir (penalty scored); Caio Alexandre (penalty missed)		(penalty scored) Anselmo Ramon; (penalty scored) Gegê; (penalty scored) Rômulo; (penalty scored) Hereda; (penalty scored) Mike; (penalty scored) João Pedro; (penalty scored) Matheus Ribeiro; (penalty scored) Lucas Kallyel
