= David Martins =

Brazilian footballer

Personal information
- Full name: David Martins Almeida de Lira
- Date of birth: 15 September 2007 (age 19)
- Place of birth: Rio de Janeiro, Brazil
- Position: Midfielder

Team information
- Current team: Bahia
- Number: 63

Youth career
- 2021: Macaé
- 2022: Portuguesa-RJ
- 2022–2024: América Mineiro
- 2025–: Bahia

Senior career*
Years	Team	Apps	(Gls)
2025–	Bahia	13	(0)
- * Club domestic league appearances and goals as of 15:33, 13 November 2026 (UTC)

David Martins Almeida de Lira (born 15 September 2007), known as David Martins, is a Brazilian footballer who plays as a midfielder for Bahia.

== Career ==
Born in Rio de Janeiro, David Martins joined América Mineiro's youth sides in July 2022, from Portuguesa-RJ. He signed a professional contract with the club in the following year, but was transferred to Bahia on 14 December 2024, for a rumoured fee of R$ 12 million.

David Martins made his senior debut on 9 February 2025, coming on as a second-half substitute for Erick Pulga in a 6–0 Campeonato Baiano home routing of Colo Colo. Mainly used in the under-20 team in that season, he featured more regularly during the 2026 Campeonato Baiano as his side opted to use several youth players in the competition.

== Career statistics ==
As of 13 November 2026

Club	Season	League			State League		Cup		Continental		Other		Total	
Club	Season	Division	Apps	Goals	Apps	Goals	Apps	Goals	Apps	Goals	Apps	Goals	Apps	Goals
Bahia	2025	Série A	0	0	1	0	0	0	0	0	2 (Note: Appearance(s) in Copa do Nordeste)	0	3	0
Bahia	2026	Série A	3	0	9	0	0	0	0	0	0	0	12	0
Career total			3	0	10	0	0	0	0	0	2	0	15	0

== Honours ==
Bahia

- Campeonato Baiano: 2025, 2026
- Copa do Nordeste: 2025
