= Caio Suassuna =

Brazilian footballer

Personal information
- Full name: Caio Suassuna Gonçalves Ferreira
- Date of birth: 23 March 2007 (age 19)
- Place of birth: Recife, Brazil
- Height: 1.84 m (6 ft 0 in)
- Position: Forward

Team information
- Current team: Avaí (on loan from Bahia)
- Number: 19

Youth career
- 2022–2023: Náutico
- 2024: Cruzeiro
- 2025: Athletico Paranaense
- 2025–: Bahia

Senior career*
Years	Team	Apps	(Gls)
2026–	Bahia	5	(0)
2026–	→ Avaí (loan)	8	(1)
- * Club domestic league appearances and goals as of 18 November 2026

Caio Suassuna Gonçalves Ferreira (born 23 March 2007), known as Caio Suassuna, is a Brazilian footballer who plays as a forward for Avaí, on loan from Bahia.

== Career ==
Born in Recife, Pernambuco, Caio Suassuna played for the youth sides of Náutico, Cruzeiro and Athletico Paranaense before joining Bahia in August 2025. He made his senior debut with the latter on 14 January 2026, coming on as a second-half substitute for Dell in a 3–0 Campeonato Baiano away win over Bahia de Feira.

Caio Suassuna returned to the under-20 squad in March 2026, before again becoming an option in the first team in May, after the injury of Willian José.

== Personal life ==
Caio Suassuna is the great-nephew of Ariano Suassuna, an iconic Brazilian playwright.

== Career statistics ==
As of 17 May 2026

Club	Season	League			State League		Cup		Continental		Other		Total	
Club	Season	Division	Apps	Goals	Apps	Goals	Apps	Goals	Apps	Goals	Apps	Goals	Apps	Goals
Bahia	2026	Série A	1	0	4	0	1	0	0	0	0	0	6	0
Career total			1	0	4	0	1	0	0	0	0	0	6	0

== Honours ==
Bahia

- Campeonato Baiano: 2026
