= Afrobapho =

Brazilian Black LGBTQ artist collective

- Formation: 2015
- Headquarters: Salvador, Bahia, Brazil
- Official language: Portuguese

Coletivo Afrobapho, or simply Afrobapho, is a Brazilian artist collective of young Black LGBTQ people from the outskirts of Salvador, Bahia.

Its goal is to give visibility to Black artists from marginalized communities and to the intersectionality between race and sexuality. Afrobapho's projects are primarily disseminated through social media.

== History ==
Founded in 2015, it originated from a WhatsApp group created after a Facebook page was established to discuss experiences related to the identities of young people, gay people, Black people, and those living in marginalized communities—all concepts conceived by the artist Alan Costa. It participated in the 2018 edition of the World Social Forum, held in Salvador.

Inspired by the Batekoo party and the film Paris Is Burning, they organize the Afrobapho Party with editions in Salvador and some other Brazilian cities, in addition to several other events focused on artivism.

== See also ==
- Grupo Gay da Bahia
- Dendê Futebol Clube
- LGBTQ rights in Bahia
- Jorge Lafond
