= Kauê Furquim =

Brazilian footballer (born 2009)

Personal information
- Full name: Kauê Junior Furquim da Silva
- Date of birth: 27 February 2009 (age 17)
- Place of birth: Guarulhos, Brazil
- Height: 1.73 m (5 ft 8 in)
- Position: Winger

Team information
- Current team: Bahia
- Number: 57

Youth career
- 2023–2025: Corinthians
- 2025–: Bahia

Senior career*
Years	Team	Apps	(Gls)
2025–	Bahia	15	(2)

International career^{‡}
2024	Brazil U15		
2025	Brazil U16	2	(0)
2026–	Brazil U17	11	(6)
2026–	Brazil U18	3	(4)
- * Club domestic league appearances and goals as of 15:31, 13 November 2026 (UTC) ‡ National team caps and goals as of 15:31, 13 November 2026 (UTC)

Kauê Junior Furquim da Silva (born 27 February 2009), better known as Kauê Furquim, is a Brazilian professional footballer who plays as winger for Campeonato Brasileiro Série A club Bahia.

== Club career ==
=== Corinthians ===
Born in Guarulhos, Furquim began his career as a futsal player with Corinthians. At the end of 2023, he switched to association football and quickly rose to prominence playing for the club's youth teams. He was called up to the Brazil under-15 national team in 2024, and in 2025 played for the under-17 and under-20 categories. He was also named to the senior squad by coach Dorival Júnior, appearing as a substitute in the 2025 Campeonato Brasileiro Série A matches against Fortaleza and Grêmio.

=== Bahia ===
Due to his prominence, Furquim had renewed his contract with Corinthians with a €50 million release clause for the international market. However, due to current Brazilian legislation, there was the possibility of acquiring the athlete for a lower release clause, and his purchase was made on 14 August 2025, by Bahia for R$14 million (circa €2.2 million at the time). The signing sparked controversy in Brazilian football, with Corinthians' board accusing Bahia of merely acting as an intermediary for the City Group's acquisition of the player, a violation of the vigent law. Corinthians, in turn, had been boycotted from youth competitions earlier this year, accused of luring underage athletes to the club.

Furquim was added to Bahia's under-20 squad, making his debut for the club on 28 August 2025, in a Copa do Nordeste Sub-20 match against Piauí. On 5 September, he scored a goal in the semi-final match of the same competition against Vitória, gaining attention again.

On 5 October 2025, Furquim made his professional debut at age of 16, coming on as a substitute at the end of the Série A match against Flamengo.

== Career statistics ==
As of 13 November 2026

Club	Season	League			State League (Note: Includes Campeonato Baiano)		Copa do Brasil		Continental		Other		Total	
Club	Season	Division	Apps	Goals	Apps	Goals	Apps	Goals	Apps	Goals	Apps	Goals	Apps	Goals
Bahia	2025	Série A	1	0	—		—		—		—		1	0
Bahia	2026	Série A	7	0	7	2	0	0	0	0	—		14	2
Career total			8	0	7	2	0	0	0	0	0	0	15	2

== Honours ==
Bahia

- Campeonato Baiano: 2026
