= Caio Alexandre =

Brazilian footballer (born 1999)

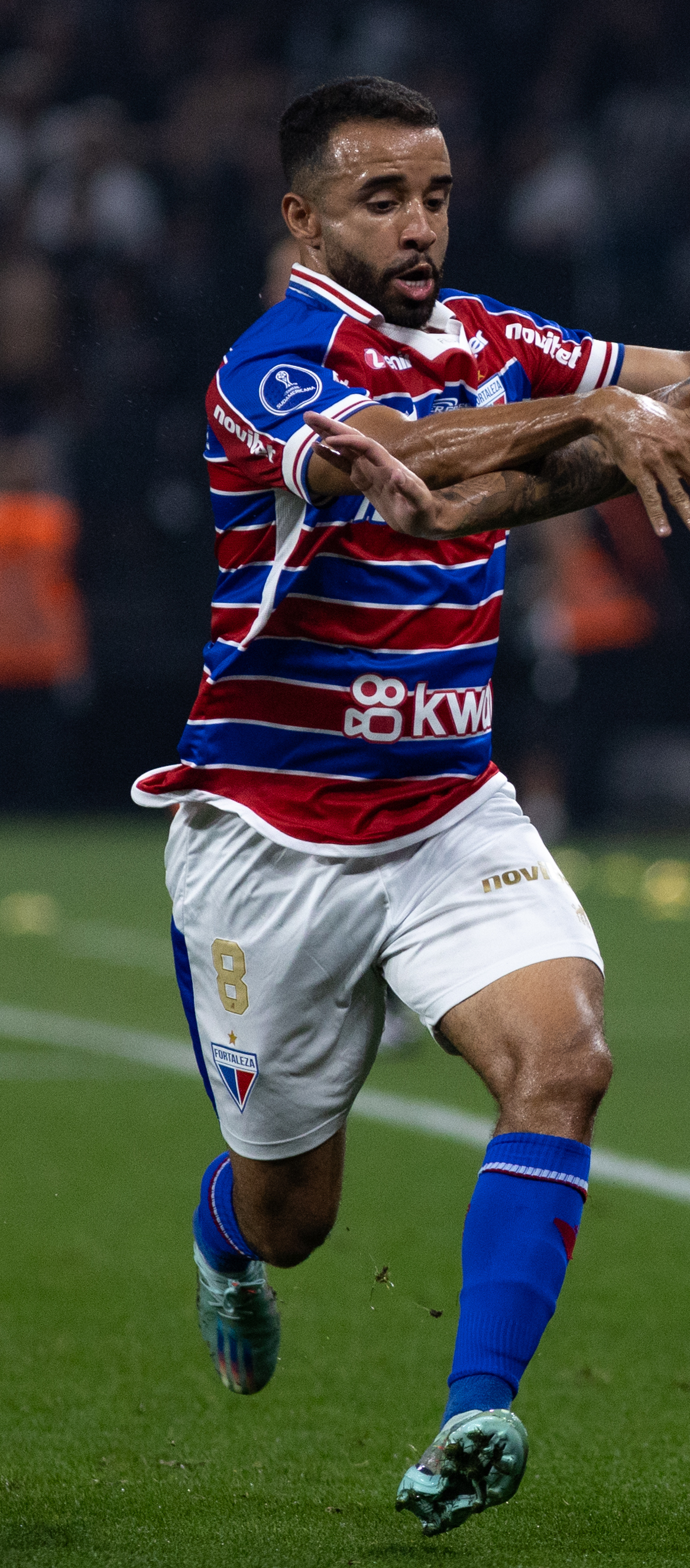
- Caio Alexandre with Fortaleza in 2023

Personal information
- Full name: Caio Alexandre Souza e Silva
- Date of birth: 24 February 1999 (age 27)
- Place of birth: Duque de Caxias, Brazil
- Height: 1.74 m (5 ft 9 in)
- Position: Midfielder

Team information
- Current team: Bahia
- Number: 8

Youth career
- 2014–2019: Botafogo

Senior career*
Years	Team	Apps	(Gls)
2020–2021	Botafogo	44	(5)
2021–2024	Vancouver Whitecaps	19	(0)
2022	Whitecaps FC 2	2	(0)
2022–2023	→ Fortaleza (loan)	55	(6)
2024–	Bahia	101	(3)
- * Club domestic league appearances and goals as of 13:49, 11 November 2026 (UTC)

Caio Alexandre Souza e Silva (born 24 February 1999), known as Caio Alexandre, is a Brazilian professional footballer who plays as a midfielder for Bahia.

== Club career ==
=== Vancouver Whitecaps FC ===
On 12 March 2021, Caio Alexandre joined Major League Soccer club Vancouver Whitecaps FC. In August 2021, he suffered a fracture in his left foot, and underwent successful surgery.

In April 2022, he suffered a left hand fracture.

== Career statistics ==
=== Club ===
As of 11 November 2026.

Club	Season	League			State league (Note: Includes Campeonato Carioca, Campeonato Cearense, Campeonato Baiano)		Cup (Note: Includes Copa do Brasil)		Continental		Other		Total	
Club	Season	Division	Apps	Goals	Apps	Goals	Apps	Goals	Apps	Goals	Apps	Goals	Apps	Goals
Botafogo	2020	Série A	34	4	10	1	6	0	—		—		50	5
Vancouver Whitecaps	2021	Major League Soccer	15	0	—		—		—		0	0	15	0
Vancouver Whitecaps	2022	Major League Soccer	4	0	—		—		—		1 (Note: Appearance(s) in Canadian Championship)	0	5	0
Vancouver Whitecaps	Total		19	0	—		—		—		1	0	20	0
Whitecaps FC 2	2022	MLS Next Pro	2	0	—		—		—		—		2	0
Fortaleza	2022	Série A	12	1	—		—		—		—		12	1
Fortaleza	2023	Série A	34	2	9	3	1	0	15 (Note: Four appearances in Copa Libertadores, eleven appearances in Copa Sudamericana)	0	6 (Note: Appearance(s) in Copa do Nordeste)	0	65	5
Fortaleza	Total		46	3	9	3	1	0	15	0	6	0	77	6
Bahia	2024	Série A	36	2	11	0	8	0	—		9	1	64	3
Bahia	2025	Série A	21	0	6	0	1	0	12 (Note: Ten appearances in Copa Libertadores, two appearances in Copa Sudamericana)	0	5	1	45	1
Bahia	2026	Série A	22	0	5	1	1	0	2 (Note: Appearance(s) in Copa Libertadores)	0	—		30	1
Bahia	Total		79	2	22	1	10	0	14	0	14	2	139	5
Career total			180	9	41	5	17	0	29	0	21	2	288	16

== Honours ==
=== Club ===
Vancouver Whitecaps FC

- Canadian Championship: 2022

Fortaleza

- Campeonato Cearense: 2023

Bahia

- Campeonato Baiano: 2025, 2026
- Copa do Nordeste: 2025
