= José Guilherme =

Brazilian footballer

Personal information
- Full name: José Guilherme de Lima Costa
- Date of birth: 16 March 2005 (age 21)
- Place of birth: Fortaleza, Brazil
- Height: 1.81 m (5 ft 11 in)
- Position: Left-back

Team information
- Current team: Bahia
- Number: 66

Youth career
- 2016–2018: Palmeiras
- 2018–2019: Portuguesa
- 2019–2020: Strikers Brasil
- 2020–2021: Sport-SE
- 2021–2024: Grêmio
- 2025: Bahia

Senior career*
| Years | Team | Apps | (Gls) |
| 2024 | Grêmio | 7 | (0) |
| 2025– | Bahia | 14 | (0) |

International career^{‡}
| 2025 | Brazil U20 | 5 | (0) |
Medal record
Men's football
Representing Brazil
South American U-20 Championship
| Winner | 2025 Venezuela |
- * Club domestic league appearances and goals as of 15:53, 13 November 2026 (UTC) ‡ National team caps and goals as of 16 February 2025

José Guilherme de Lima Costa (born 16 March 2005), known as José Guilherme or Zé Guilherme, is a Brazilian professional footballer who plays as a left-back for Bahia.

== Career ==
Born in Fortaleza, Ceará, José Guilherme joined Grêmio's youth setup in 2021, after representing Portuguesa and Palmeiras. He signed his first professional contract with the former on 28 July 2022, after agreeing to a three-year deal.

José Guilherme made his senior debut on 14 February 2024, coming on as a late substitute for fellow youth graduate Wesley Costa in a 0–0 Campeonato Gaúcho away draw against Ypiranga-RS. He made his Série A debut on 14 April, replacing Cuiabano in a 2–1 loss at Vasco da Gama.

On 16 January 2025, Zé Guilherme signed with Bahia.

== Career statistics ==
As of 13 November 2026

Appearances and goals by club, season and competition
| Club | Season | League | | | State League | | National Cup | | Continental | | Other | | Total | |
| Club | Season | Division | Apps | Goals | Apps | Goals | Apps | Goals | Apps | Goals | Apps | Goals | Apps | Goals |
|---|---|---|---|---|---|---|---|---|---|---|---|---|---|---|
| Grêmio | 2024 | Série A | 6 | 0 | 1 | 0 | 1 | 0 | 1 (Note: Appearance(s) in Copa Libertadores) | 0 | — | | 9 | 0 |
| Bahia | 2025 | Série A | 3 | 0 | 0 | 0 | 0 | 0 | 0 | 0 | 4 (Note: Appearance(s) in Copa do Nordeste) | 0 | 7 | 0 |
| Bahia | 2026 | Série A | 7 | 0 | 4 | 0 | 0 | 0 | 0 | 0 | — | | 11 | 0 |
| Bahia | Total | | 10 | 0 | 4 | 0 | 0 | 0 | 0 | 0 | 4 | 0 | 18 | 0 |
| Career total | | | 16 | 0 | 5 | 0 | 1 | 0 | 1 | 0 | 4 | 0 | 27 | 0 |

== Honours ==
Grêmio

- Campeonato Gaúcho: 2024

Bahia

- Copa do Nordeste: 2025
- Campeonato Baiano: 2026

Brazil U20

- South American U-20 Championship: 2025
