= 2026 Esporte Clube Bahia season =

Bahia
2026 season
- Chairman: Emerson Ferretti
- Manager: Rogério Ceni
- Stadium: Arena Fonte Nova
- Série A: 4th
- Baiano: Champions (52nd title)
- Copa do Brasil: Fifth round
- Copa Libertadores: Second stage
| Home colours | Away colours | Third colours |

The 2026 season will be Bahia's 95th season in the club's history. Bahia will compete in the Série A, Copa Libertadores, Copa do Brasil and Campeonato Baiano.

== Squad ==
As of 28 March 2026

Note: Flags indicate national team as defined under FIFA eligibility rules; some limited exceptions apply. Players may hold more than one non-FIFA nationality.

| No. | Pos. | Nation | Player |
|---|---|---|---|
| 1 | GK | BRA | Ronaldo |
| 2 | DF | BRA | Gilberto |
| 3 | DF | BRA | Gabriel Xavier |
| 4 | DF | BRA | Kanu |
| 5 | MF | URU | Nicolás Acevedo |
| 6 | MF | BRA | Jean Lucas (vice-captain) |
| 7 | FW | BRA | Ademir |
| 8 | MF | BRA | Caio Alexandre |
| 10 | MF | BRA | Éverton Ribeiro (captain) |
| 11 | MF | BRA | Rodrigo Nestor |
| 12 | FW | BRA | Willian José |
| 14 | MF | BRA | Erick |
| 15 | FW | URU | Michel Araújo |
| 16 | FW | BRA | Erick Pulga |
| 21 | DF | ARG | Santiago Ramos Mingo |

| No. | Pos. | Nation | Player |
|---|---|---|---|
| 22 | GK | BRA | Léo Vieira |
| 23 | FW | ARG | Mateo Sanabria |
| 25 | DF | BRA | Iago Borduchi |
| 27 | FW | BRA | Everaldo (on loan from Fluminense) |
| 31 | DF | ARG | Román Gómez |
| 33 | DF | BRA | David Duarte |
| 34 | GK | BRA | João Paulo (on loan from Santos) |
| 43 | DF | BRA | Luiz Gustavo |
| 44 | DF | BRA | Marcos Victor |
| 46 | DF | BRA | Luciano Juba |
| 66 | DF | BRA | Zé Guilherme |
| 77 | FW | BRA | Ruan Pablo |
| 89 | FW | BRA | Dell |
| 99 | FW | URU | Kike Olivera (on loan from Grêmio) |

== Competitions ==
=== Overall record ===
| Competition | First match | Last match | Starting round | Final position | Record | | | | | | | |
| Competition | First match | Last match | Starting round | Final position | Pld | W | D | L | GF | GA | GD | Win % |
|---|---|---|---|---|---|---|---|---|---|---|---|---|
| Baiano | 11 January | 7 March | First stage | Winner | 11 | 9 | 2 | 0 | 32 | 12 | +20 | 81.82 |
| Série A | 28 January | 2 December | Matchday 1 | | 27 | 12 | 10 | 5 | 42 | 33 | +9 | 44.44 |
| Copa Libertadores | 17 February | 25 February | Second stage | Second stage | 2 | 1 | 0 | 1 | 2 | 2 | +0 | 50.00 |
| Copa do Brasil | 22 April | 13 May | Fifth round | Fifth round | 2 | 0 | 0 | 2 | 2 | 5 | −3 | 0.00 |
| Total | | | | | 42 | 22 | 12 | 8 | 78 | 52 | +26 | 52.38 |

Last updated: 14 September 2026
Source: Competitions

=== Campeonato Baiano ===
==== First stage ====
| 11 January 2026 1 | Bahia | 4–2 | Jequié | Salvador |
| 16:00 (UTC-3) | Jota 6'; Ruan Pablo 35', 41'; Fredi 90+3' | Report | Tiago Recife 23'; Nael 63' | Stadium: Casa de Apostas (Arena Fonte Nova); Attendance: 18,600; Referee: Marielson Alves Silva |

| 14 January 2026 2 | Bahia de Feira | 0–3 | Bahia | Feira de Santana |
| 19:15 (UTC-3) | | Report | Rezende 17'; Dell 40'; Erick 86' | Stadium: Arena Cajueiro; Attendance: 4,021; Referee: Bruno Nogueira Prado |

| 17 January 2026 3 | Bahia | 3–0 | Galícia | Salvador |
| 16:00 (UTC-3) | Erick 44'; Iago 45'; Kauê 70' | Report | | Stadium: Casa de Apostas (Arena Fonte Nova); Attendance: 20,631; Referee: Wagner Francisco Silva Souza |

| 20 January 2026 4 | Bahia | 5–1 | Barcelona de Ilhéus | Salvador |
| 19:15 (UTC-3) | Luciano Juba 18'; Éverton Ribeiro 26'; Willian José 50'; Ademir 62', 65' | Report | Matheus Guimarães 52' | Stadium: Casa de Apostas (Arena Fonte Nova); Attendance: 18,720; Referee: Bruno Pereira Vasconcelos |

| 25 January 2026 5 | Vitória | 0–1 | Bahia | Salvador |
| 16:00 (UTC-3) | | Report | Dell 60' | Stadium: Estádio Manoel Barradas (Barradão); Attendance: 29,843; Referee: Wagner Francisco Silva Souza |

| 1 February 2026 6 | Bahia | 3–1 | Porto | Salvador |
| 18:30 (UTC-3) | Kauê 3'; Dell 26'; Michel Araújo 45+3' | Report | Luan Rodrigues 36' (pen.) | Stadium: Casa de Apostas (Arena Fonte Nova); Attendance: 16,152; Referee: Ricarle Gustavo Gonçalves Batista |

| 8 February 2026 7 | Juazeirense | 1–1 | Bahia | Juazeiro |
| 16:00 (UTC-3) | Adailton Bravo 67' (pen.) | Report | Everaldo 53' (pen.) | Stadium: Estádio Adauto Moraes; Attendance: 2,325; Referee: Eziquiel Sousa Costa |

| 14 February 2026 8 | Bahia | 2–2 | Jacuipense | Salvador |
| 16:00 (UTC-3) | Caio Alexandre 5'; Erick 23' | Report | Thiago 36'; Gustavo 90+1' | Stadium: Casa de Apostas (Arena Fonte Nova); Attendance: 17,312; Referee: Bruno Pereira Vasconcelos |

| 21 February 2026 9 | Atlético de Alagoinhas | 2–4 | Bahia | Salvador |
| 20:00 (UTC-3) | Douglas Pantera 62'; Everson Ribeiro 85' | Report | Everaldo 8'; Rodrigo Nestor 37'; Erick 44'; Dell 52' | Stadium: Estádio Governador Roberto Santos (Pituaçu); Referee: Bruno Fernandez Moreira |

==== Final stages ====
| 28 February 2026 Semi-final | Bahia | 4–2 | Juazeirense | Salvador |
| 17:00 (UTC-3) | Willian José 23' (pen.); Erick Pulga 33'; Olivera 61'; Sanabria 90+2' | Report | Bino 77'; Vitinho 87' | Stadium: Casa de Apostas (Arena Fonte Nova) |

| 7 March 2026 Final | Bahia | 2–1 | Vitória | Salvador |
| 17:00 (UTC-3) | Jean Lucas 53', 65' | Report | Gabriel Baralhas 19' | Stadium: Estádio Manoel Barradas (Barradão); Attendance: 48,261; Referee: Wilton Pereira Sampaio |

=== Copa Libertadores ===
==== Qualifying rounds ====
Second stage

| 18 February 2026 First leg | O'Higgins (Chile) | 1–0 | (Brazil) Bahia | Rancagua, Chile |
| 19:00 UTC−3 | González 4' | Report | | Stadium: Estadio El Teniente; Attendance: 8,282; Referee: Javier Feres (Uruguay) |

| 25 February 2026 Second leg | Bahia (Brazil) | 2–1 (2–2 agg.) (3–4 p) | (Chile) O'Higgins | Salvador |
| 19:00 UTC−3 | Willian José 1', 45+1' | | Castillo 54' | Stadium: Arena Fonte Nova; Referee: Maximiliano Ramírez (Argentina) |
| | Penalties |
| | Everaldo (penalty scored); Luciano Juba (penalty scored); Dell (penalty missed); Rodrigo (penalty scored); Éverton Ribeiro (penalty missed) | | (penalty scored) González; (penalty missed) Castillo; (penalty scored) Pavez; (penalty scored) Vecino; (penalty scored) Brizuela |

=== Copa do Brasil ===
==== Fifth round ====
| 22 April 2026 First leg | Bahia | 1–3 | Remo | Salvador |
| 19:00 (UTC-3) | Willian José 22' | Report | Tchamba 17'; Yago Pikachu 74' (pen.); Alef Manga 90+5' | Stadium: Casa de Apostas (Arena Fonte Nova); Attendance: 31,147; Referee: Alex Gomes Stefano |

| 13 May 2026 Second leg | Remo | 2–1 (2-5 agg.) | Bahia | Belém |
| 21:30 (UTC-3) | Patrick 35'; Picco 90' | Report | Erick 22' | Stadium: Estádio Olímpico do Pará (Mangueirão); Attendance: 22,461; Referee: Flavio Rodrigues de Souza |

=== Série A ===
==== League table ====
| Pos | Team | Pld | W | D | L | GF | GA | GD | Pts | Qualification or relegation |
|---|---|---|---|---|---|---|---|---|---|---|
| 4 | Fluminense (X) | 34 | 16 | 9 | 9 | 55 | 42 | +13 | 57 | Qualification for Copa Libertadores group stage |
| 5 | Athletico Paranaense | 34 | 15 | 9 | 10 | 51 | 43 | +8 | 54 | Qualification for Copa Libertadores second stage (Note: Since Palmeiras, who qualified for the Copa Libertadores group stage on league performance, reached the 2026 Copa do Brasil final, the Copa Libertadores second stage berth allocated to the 2026 Copa do Brasil runners-up was passed to the Série A's highest-placed team not already qualified.) |
| 6 | Bahia | 34 | 14 | 11 | 9 | 50 | 45 | +5 | 53 | Qualification for Copa Libertadores second stage |
| 7 | Atlético Mineiro | 35 | 14 | 9 | 12 | 44 | 40 | +4 | 51 | Qualification for Copa Sudamericana group stage |
| 8 | Red Bull Bragantino | 34 | 13 | 8 | 13 | 44 | 39 | +5 | 47 | Qualification for Copa Sudamericana group stage |

Updated to match(es) played on 14 November 2026 (1 of 2 matches finished). Source: CBF
Rules for classification: 1) points; 2) wins; 3) goal difference; 4) goals scored; 5) head-to-head results (only between two teams); 6) fewest red cards; 7) fewest yellow cards; 8) drawing of lots.
(X) Assured of Copa Sudamericana, but may still qualify for Copa Libertadores

==== Results summary ====
| Overall | | | | | | | | Home | | | | | | Away | | | | | |
| Pld | W | D | L | GF | GA | GD | Pts | W | D | L | GF | GA | GD | W | D | L | GF | GA | GD |
|---|---|---|---|---|---|---|---|---|---|---|---|---|---|---|---|---|---|---|---|
| 27 | 12 | 10 | 5 | 42 | 33 | +9 | 46 | 6 | 6 | 2 | 22 | 14 | +8 | 6 | 4 | 3 | 20 | 19 | +1 |

Last updated: 14 September 2026.
Source: CBF

==== Matches ====
| 28 January 2026 1 | Corinthians | 1–2 | Bahia | Santos |
| 20:00 (UTC-3) | Bidon 12' | Report | Jean Lucas 32'; Willian José 45+1' (pen.) | Stadium: Estádio Urbano Caldeira (Vila Belmiro); Attendance: 13,788; Referee: Anderson Daronco |
Note: Match was moved forward from original date of 29 January and relocated from Neo Química Arena due to Corinthians' participation in the 2026 Supercopa do Brasil.

| 5 February 2026 2 | Bahia | 1–1 | Fluminense | Salvador |
| 19:00 (UTC-3) | Olivera 78' | Report | John Kennedy 20' | Stadium: Casa de Apostas (Arena Fonte Nova); Attendance: 40,424; Referee: Matheus Delgado Candançan |

| 11 February 2026 3 | Vasco da Gama | 0–1 | Bahia | Rio de Janeiro |
| 21:30 (UTC-3) | | Report | Luciano Juba 22' | Stadium: Estádio Vasco da Gama (São Januário); Attendance: 11,477; Referee: Paulo César Zanovelli da Silva |

| 11 March 2026 5 | Bahia | 1–1 | Vitória | Salvador |
| 20:00 (UTC-3) | Jean Lucas 45+6' | Report | Ramon 45+2' | Stadium: Casa de Apostas (Arena Fonte Nova); Attendance: 46,632; Referee: Rafael Rodrigo Klein |

| 15 March 2026 6 | Internacional | 0–1 | Bahia | Porto Alegre |
| 16:00 (UTC-3) | | Report | Willian José 22' | Stadium: Estádio José Pinheiro Borda (Beira-Rio); Attendance: 16,574; Referee: Fernando Antonio Mendes |

| 18 March 2026 7 | Bahia | 2–0 | Red Bull Bragantino | Salvador |
| 19:00 (UTC-3) | Luciano Juba 16'; Erick 40' | Report | | Stadium: Casa de Apostas (Arena Fonte Nova); Attendance: 27,857; Referee: Ramon Abatti Abel |

| 22 March 2026 8 | Remo | 4–1 | Bahia | Belém |
| 16:00 (UTC-3) | Vitor Bueno 45+8'; Gabriel Taliari 48', 57'; Jajá 82' | Report | Everaldo 32' | Stadium: Estádio Olímpico do Pará (Mangueirão); Attendance: 22,447; Referee: João Vitor Gobi |

| 1 April 2026 9 | Bahia | 3–0 | Athletico Paranaense | Salvador |
| 20:00 (UTC-3) | Everaldo 2', 34'; Luciano Juba 90+2' | Report | | Stadium: Casa de Apostas (Arena Fonte Nova); Attendance: 29,316; Referee: Jonathan Benkenstein Pinheiro |

| 5 April 2026 10 | Bahia | 1–2 | Palmeiras | Salvador |
| 19:30 (UTC-3) | David Duarte 59' | Report | Arias 42'; Ramos Mingo 87' (o.g.) | Stadium: Casa de Apostas (Arena Fonte Nova); Attendance: 41,645; Referee: Lucas Casagrande |

| 11 April 2026 11 | Mirassol | 1–2 | Bahia | Mirassol |
| 18:30 (UTC-3) | David Duarte 13' (o.g.) | Report | Luciano Juba 64' (pen.); Sanabria 88' | Stadium: Estádio José Maria de Campos Maia; Attendance: 4,276; Referee: Paulo Cesar Zanovelli da Silva |

| 19 April 2026 12 | Flamengo | 2–0 | Bahia | Rio de Janeiro |
| 19:30 (UTC-3) | de Arrascaeta 16'; Lucas Paquetá 79' | Report | | Stadium: Estádio Jornalista Mário Filho (Maracanã); Attendance: 64,565; Referee: Flávio Rodrigues de Souza |

| 25 April 2026 13 | Bahia | 2–2 | Santos | Salvador |
| 18:30 (UTC-3) | Luciano Juba 76'; Willian José 83' | Report | Rollheiser 22' (pen.), 45+4' (pen.) | Stadium: Casa de Apostas (Arena Fonte Nova); Attendance: 45,813; Referee: Ramon Abatti Abel |

| 3 May 2026 14 | São Paulo | 2–2 | Bahia | Bragança Paulista |
| 16:00 (UTC-3) | Artur 17'; Ferreirinha 73' | Report | Luciano Juba 62'; Erick 90+7' | Stadium: Estádio Cícero de Souza Marques; Attendance: 9,390; Referee: Davi De Oliveira Lacerda |

| 9 May 2026 15 | Bahia | 1–2 | Cruzeiro | Salvador |
| 21:00 (UTC-3) | Luciano Juba 27' (pen.) | Report | Kauã Moraes 41'; Kaique Kenji 86' | Stadium: Casa de Apostas (Arena Fonte Nova); Attendance: 30,423; Referee: Rodrigo José Pereira de Lima |

| 17 May 2026 16 | Bahia | 1–1 | Grêmio | Salvador |
| 16:00 (UTC-3) | Sanabria 72' | Report | Viery 62' | Stadium: Casa de Apostas (Arena Fonte Nova); Attendance: 26,927; Referee: Fernando Salles Nascimento Filho |

| 25 May 2026 17 | Coritiba | 3–2 | Bahia | Curitiba |
| 20:00 (UTC-3) | Bruno Melo 56'; Lavega 65'; Breno Lopes 68' | Report | Tiago Cóser 26' (o.g.); Everaldo 90+1' | Stadium: Estádio Major Antônio (Couto Pereira); Attendance: 20,680; Referee: Anderson Daronco |

| 30 May 2026 18 | Bahia | 2–1 | Botafogo | Salvador |
| 17:30 (UTC-3) | Ferraresi 57' (o.g.); David Duarte 90+2' | Report | Huguinho 7' | Stadium: Casa de Apostas (Arena Fonte Nova); Attendance: 25,249; Referee: Davi de Oliveira Lacerda |

| 17 July 2026 4* | Bahia | 2–0 | Chapecoense | Salvador |
| 19:30 (UTC-3) | Rodrigo Nestor 11' (pen.); Gómez 78' | Report | | Stadium: Casa de Apostas (Arena Fonte Nova); Attendance: 29,421; Referee: Paulo Cesar Zanovelli da Silva |

| 21 July 2026 19 | Atlético Mineiro | 1–1 | Bahia | Belo Horizonte |
| 19:30 (UTC-3) | Ruan 45' | Report | Ademir 56' | Stadium: Arena MRV; Attendance: 31,018; Referee: Bráulio da Silva Machado |

| 26 July 2026 20 | Bahia | 1–1 | Corinthians | Salvador |
| 16:00 (UTC-3) | David Duarte 45+4' | Report | Angileri 8' | Stadium: Casa de Apostas (Arena Fonte Nova); Attendance: 44,576; Referee: Ramon Abatti Abel |

| 29 July 2026 21 | Fluminense | 0–0 | Bahia | Rio de Janeiro |
| 21:30 (UTC-3) | | Report | | Stadium: Estádio Jornalista Mário Filho (Maracanã); Attendance: 12,351; Referee: Raphael Claus |

| 9 August 2026 22 | Bahia | 0–0 | Vasco da Gama | Salvador |
| 16:00 (UTC-3) | | Report | | Stadium: Casa de Apostas (Arena Fonte Nova); Attendance: 40,175; Referee: Rodrigo José Pereira de Lima |

| 16 August 2026 23 | Chapecoense | 3–3 | Bahia | Chapecó |
| 11:00 (UTC-3) | Giovanni Augusto 18'; Marcinho 47'; Túlio Eduardo 70' | Report | Véliz 13' (pen.); Kauan 41' (o.g.); Acevedo 64' | Stadium: Arena Condá; Attendance: 6,087; Referee: Daiane Muniz |

| 23 August 2026 24 | Vitória | 0–2 | Bahia | Salvador |
| 16:00 (UTC-3) | | Report | Véliz 66'; Jean Lucas 90+6' | Stadium: Estádio Manoel Barradas (Barradão); Attendance: 30,553; Referee: Raphael Claus |

| 30 August 2026 25 | Bahia | 3–2 | Internacional | Salvador |
| 19:30 (UTC-3) | Erick Pulga 16', 23'; Erick 90+4' | Report | Alan Patrick 16'; Vitinho 52' | Stadium: Casa de Apostas (Arena Fonte Nova); Referee: Paulo Cesar Zanovelli da Silva |

| 5 September 2026 26 | Red Bull Bragantino | 2–3 | Bahia | Bragança Paulista |
| 16:00 (UTC-3) | Lucas Barbosa 13'; Ramos Mingo 45' (o.g.) | Report | Luciano Juba 33' (pen.); Véliz 38'; Erick 49' | Stadium: Estádio Cícero de Souza Marques; Attendance: 3,090; Referee: Maguielson Lima Barbosa |

| 14 September 2026 27 | Bahia | 2–1 | Remo | Salvador |
| 20:00 (UTC-3) | Jean Lucas 20'; Luciano Juba 90+1' (pen.) | Report | Vitor Bueno 90+6' (pen.) | Stadium: Casa de Apostas (Arena Fonte Nova); Attendance: 34,359; Referee: Rodrigo José Pereira de Lima |

| 20 September 2026 28 | Athletico Paranaense | – | Bahia | Curitiba |
| (UTC-3) | | | | Stadium: Estádio Mario Celso Petraglia (Arena da Baixada) |

| 7 October 2026 29 | Palmeiras | – | Bahia | São Paulo |
| (UTC-3) | | | | Stadium: Allianz Parque |

| 11 October 2026 30 | Bahia | – | Mirassol | Salvador |
| (UTC-3) | | | | Stadium: Casa de Apostas (Arena Fonte Nova) |

| 18 October 2026 31 | Bahia | – | Flamengo | Salvador |
| (UTC-3) | | | | Stadium: Casa de Apostas (Arena Fonte Nova) |

| 25 October 2026 32 | Santos | – | Bahia | Santos |
| (UTC-3) | | | | Stadium: Estádio Urbano Caldeira (Vila Belmiro) |

| 28 October 2026 33 | Bahia | – | São Paulo | Salvador |
| (UTC-3) | | | | Stadium: Casa de Apostas (Arena Fonte Nova) |

| 4 November 2026 34 | Cruzeiro | – | Bahia | Belo Horizonte |
| (UTC-3) | | | | Stadium: Estádio Governador Magalhães Pinto (Mineirão) |

| 18 November 2026 35 | Grêmio | – | Bahia | Porto Alegre |
| (UTC-3) | | | | Stadium: Arena do Grêmio |

| 22 November 2026 36 | Bahia | – | Coritiba | Salvador |
| (UTC-3) | | | | Stadium: Casa de Apostas (Arena Fonte Nova) |

| 29 November 2026 37 | Botafogo | – | Bahia | Rio de Janeiro |
| (UTC-3) | | | | Stadium: Estádio Olímpico Nilton Santos (Engenhão) |

| 2 December 2026 38 | Bahia | – | Atlético Mineiro | Salvador |
| (UTC-3) | | | | Stadium: Casa de Apostas (Arena Fonte Nova) |

(*) Postponed matches due to changes in competition schedules
