= David Duarte =

Brazilian footballer (born 1995)

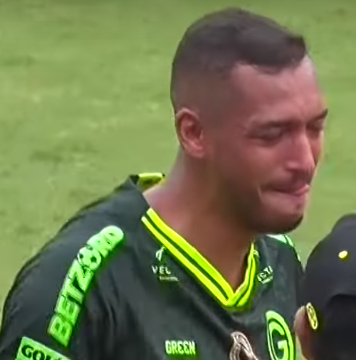
- David Duarte with Goiás in 2021

Personal information
- Full name: David de Duarte Macedo
- Date of birth: 24 January 1995 (age 31)
- Place of birth: Rio Grande, Brazil
- Height: 1.92 m (6 ft 4 in)
- Position: Centre-back

Team information
- Current team: Bahia
- Number: 33

Senior career*
Years	Team	Apps	(Gls)
2015–2021	Goiás	175	(9)
2022–2023	Fluminense	8	(0)
2023	→ Bahia (loan)	13	(1)
2024–	Bahia	68	(6)
- * Club domestic league appearances and goals as of 15:15, 13 November 2026 (UTC)

David de Duarte Macedo (born 24 January 1995), known as David Duarte, is a Brazilian footballer who plays as a central defender for Bahia.

== Professional career ==
Duarte made his professional debut with Goiás in a 3–0 Campeonato Brasileiro Série A loss to Paranaense on 30 August 2015.

== Career statistics ==
As of 13 November 2026

Club	Season	League			State League		Cup		Continental		Other		Total	
Club	Season	Division	Apps	Goals	Apps	Goals	Apps	Goals	Apps	Goals	Apps	Goals	Apps	Goals
Goiás	2015	Série A	2	0	2	0	1	0	0	0	—		5	0
Goiás	2016	Série B	10	0	9	0	1	0	—		—		20	0
Goiás	2017	Série B	9	0	6	0	2	0	—		—		17	0
Goiás	2018	Série B	35	3	13	1	7	0	—		—		55	4
Goiás	2019	Série A	7	0	10	0	1	0	—		—		18	0
Goiás	2020	Série A	30	2	0	0	1	0	—		—		31	2
Goiás	2021	Série A	33	3	9	0	1	1	—		—		43	4
Goiás	Total		126	8	49	1	14	1	0	0	—		189	10
Fluminense	2022	Série A	4	0	4	0	2	0	1 (Note: Appearance(s) in Copa Sudamericana)	0	—		11	0
Bahia	2023	Série A	11	1	2	0	4	0	—		5 (Note: Appearance(s) in Copa do Nordeste)	0	22	1
Bahia	2024	Série A	3	0	8	2	0	0	—		2	0	13	2
Bahia	2025	Série A	25	1	4	0	3	0	6 (Note: Five appearances in Copa Libertadores, one appearance in Copa Sudamericana)	0	5	0	43	1
Bahia	2026	Série A	27	3	1	0	2	0	0	0	—		30	3
Bahia	Total		66	5	15	2	9	0	6	0	12	0	108	7
Career total			196	13	68	3	25	1	7	0	12	0	308	17

== Honours ==
Goiás

- Campeonato Goiano: 2015, 2016, 2017, 2018

Fluminense

- Taça Guanabara: 2022
- Campeonato Carioca: 2022

Bahia

- Campeonato Baiano: 2023, 2025, 2026
- Copa do Nordeste: 2025
