= Ademir (footballer, born 1995) =

Brazilian footballer (born 1995)

Personal information
- Full name: Ademir da Silva Santos Júnior
- Date of birth: 16 February 1995 (age 31)
- Place of birth: São Paulo, Brazil
- Height: 1.72 m (5 ft 8 in)
- Position: Forward

Team information
- Current team: Bahia
- Number: 7

Youth career
- 2013–2014: Uberlândia

Senior career*
Years	Team	Apps	(Gls)
2015–2016	SE Patrocinense	17	(1)
2016–2018	Patrocinense	44	(10)
2017	→ Nacional-SP (loan)	0	(0)
2018–2021	América Mineiro	109	(30)
2022–2023	Atlético Mineiro	53	(5)
2023–	Bahia	144	(16)
- * Club domestic league appearances and goals as of 15:41, 13 November 2026 (UTC)

Ademir da Silva Santos Júnior (born 16 February 1995), known as Ademir Júnior, or simply Ademir, is a Brazilian professional footballer who plays as a forward for Campeonato Brasileiro Série A club Bahia.

== Club career ==
=== Early career ===
Born in São Paulo, Ademir was raised in Patrocínio, Minas Gerais. He joined Uberlândia's youth setup after a trial period, and moved to Sociedade Esportiva Patrocinense for the 2015 season, after finishing his formation.

In 2016, Ademir signed for Clube Atlético Patrocinense, and helped the side in their back-to-back promotions from the third to the first division of the Campeonato Mineiro. In 2017, he also spent a short period on loan at hometown side Nacional-SP for the year's Copa Paulista.

=== América Mineiro ===
On 5 April 2018, after impressing for Patrocinense in the 2018 Campeonato Mineiro, Ademir signed a contract with Série A side América Mineiro until December 2019. He made his top tier debut on 28 May 2018, coming on as a second-half substitute for Aderlan in a 3–1 home loss to São Paulo.

Ademir scored his first goal in the category on 3 June, netting his team's third in a 3–1 home win against Atlético Paranaense. He contributed with one goal in 14 appearances during his first season, as his side suffered relegation.

Ademir started the 2020 campaign as the club's top goalscorer in the Campeonato Mineiro with five goals, Ademir missed out the first matches of the Série B due to a thigh injury. In October of that year, he renewed his contract until December 2021, and finished the season with eight league goals and a promotion back to the main category.

In 2021, Ademir scored 13 goals in the Série A season, playing a crucial role in América's first ever qualification for the Copa Libertadores.

=== Atlético Mineiro ===
On 19 September 2021, Atlético Mineiro's president Sérgio Coelho confirmed that Ademir agreed to a pre-contract with the club, effective as of the following 1 January.

=== Bahia ===
On 1 April 2023, Esporte Clube Bahia announced the signing of Ademir on a deal running until December 2025.

== Career statistics ==
As of 13 November 2026

Club	Season	League			State League		Cup		Continental		Other		Total	
Club	Season	Division	Apps	Goals	Apps	Goals	Apps	Goals	Apps	Goals	Apps	Goals	Apps	Goals
SE Patrocinense	2015	Mineiro Módulo II	—		7	0	—		—		—		7	0
SE Patrocinense	2016	Mineiro Módulo II	—		10	1	—		—		—		10	1
SE Patrocinense	Total		—		17	1	—		—		—		17	1
Patrocinense	2016	Mineiro 2ª Divisão	—		15	2	—		—		—		15	2
Patrocinense	2017	Mineiro Módulo II	—		18	4	—		—		—		18	4
Patrocinense	2018	Mineiro	—		11	4	—		—		—		11	4
Patrocinense	Total		—		44	10	—		—		—		44	10
Nacional-SP (loan)	2017	Paulista A2	—		0	0	—		—		4 (Note: Appearance(s) in Copa Paulista)	1	4	1
América Mineiro	2018	Série A	14	1	—		0	0	—		—		14	1
América Mineiro	2019	Série B	9	1	4	1	0	0	—		—		13	2
América Mineiro	2020	Série B	28	8	12	5	10	1	—		—		50	14
América Mineiro	2021	Série A	31	13	11	1	2	1	—		—		44	15
América Mineiro	Total		82	23	27	7	12	2	—		—		121	32
Atlético Mineiro	2022	Série A	35	2	13	3	3	1	9 (Note: Appearance(s) in Copa Libertadores)	2	1 (Note: Appearance in Supercopa do Brasil)	0	61	8
Atlético Mineiro	2023	Série A	0	0	5	0	0	0	1	0	—		6	0
Atlético Mineiro	Total		35	2	18	3	3	1	10	2	1	0	67	8
Bahia	2023	Série A	33	6	—		6	0	—		—		39	6
Bahia	2024	Série A	31	3	11	2	5	0	—		8 (Note: Appearances in Copa do Nordeste)	1	55	6
Bahia	2025	Série A	30	2	5	0	3	0	11 (Note: Nine appearances and two goals in Copa Libertadores, two appearances in Copa Sudamericana)	2	6	1	55	5
Bahia	2026	Série A	30	1	4	2	2	0	2	0	—		38	3
Bahia	Total		124	12	20	4	10	0	13	2	14	2	187	20
Career total			241	37	126	25	25	3	23	4	19	3	440	72

== Honours ==
Patrocinense

- Campeonato Mineiro Módulo II: 2017

Atlético Mineiro

- Supercopa do Brasil: 2022
- Campeonato Mineiro: 2022

Bahia

- Campeonato Baiano: 2025, 2026
- Copa do Nordeste: 2025
