= Lautaro López (footballer) =

Argentine footballer (born 2004)

Personal information
- Date of birth: 30 March 2005 (age 21)
- Place of birth: Buenos Aires, Argentina
- Height: 1.85 m (6 ft 1 in)
- Position: Midfielder

Team information
- Current team: Bahia (on loan from Montevideo City Torque)
- Number: 18

Youth career
- Vélez Sarsfield

Senior career*
Years	Team	Apps	(Gls)
2023–2024	Vélez Sarsfield	0	(0)
2023	→ Defensa y Justicia (loan)	5	(0)
2024–	Montevideo City Torque	45	(0)
2025–2026	→ Lommel (loan)	27	(0)
2026–	→ Bahia (loan)	0	(0)

International career
2022–2024	Argentina U20	7	(0)
- * Club domestic league appearances and goals as of 7 April 2026

Lautaro López (born 30 March 2005) is an Argentine professional footballer who plays as a midfielder for Campeonato Brasileiro Série A club Bahia, on loan from Uruguayan club Montevideo City Torque.

== Club career ==
Born in Buenos Aires, López represented Vélez Sarsfield as a youth, and signed his first professional contract with the club on 13 July 2022. On 1 September of the following year, he moved on loan to Defensa y Justicia, and made his professional debut two days later, in a 1–1 Copa de la Liga Profesional home draw against Sarmiento.

López returned to Vélez in January 2024 after four further matches for Defensa, but was transferred to the City Football Group on 2 February, being assigned to Montevideo City Torque. He quickly established himself as a starter before joining Lommel SK, another club from the CFG, on loan on 19 August 2025.

On 10 September 2026, Bahia announced the signing of López on loan until the end of the year.

== International career ==
López has played for the Argentina nationa under-20 team.

== Career statistics ==
As of 22 September 2026

Appearances and goals by club, season and competition
Club	Season	League			Cup (Note: Includes Copa Argentina, Copa do Brasil)		Continental		Other		Total	
Club	Season	Division	Apps	Goals	Apps	Goals	Apps	Goals	Apps	Goals	Apps	Goals
Defensa y Justicia	2023	Liga Profesional	5	0	0	0	0	0	—		6	0
Montevideo City Torque	2024	Uruguayan Segunda División	28	0	4	0	—		3 (Note: Appearance(s) in promotion play-offs)	0	35	0
Montevideo City Torque	2025	Liga AUF Uruguaya	17	0	0	0	—		—		17	0
Montevideo City Torque	Total		45	0	4	0	—		3	0	52	0
Lommel	2025–26	Challenger Pro League	27	0	1	0	—		6	0	34	0
Bahia	2026	Série A	0	0	—		—		—		0	0
Career total			77	0	5	0	0	0	9	0	91	0
