= Luiz Gustavo (footballer, born April 2006) =

Brazilian footballer

Personal information
- Full name: Luiz Gustavo Marinho Ribeiro dos Santos
- Date of birth: 12 April 2006 (age 20)
- Place of birth: Foz do Iguaçu, Brazil
- Height: 1.88 m (6 ft 2 in)
- Position: Centre-back

Team information
- Current team: Bahia
- Number: 43

Youth career
- 2021–2025: Vasco da Gama
- 2022–2026: Bahia

Senior career*
Years	Team	Apps	(Gls)
2025	Vasco da Gama	8	(0)
2025–	Bahia	5	(0)
- * Club domestic league appearances and goals as of 7 April 2026

Luiz Gustavo Marinho Ribeiro dos Santos (born 12 April 2006), known as Luiz Gustavo, is a Brazilian professional footballer who plays as a centre-back for Bahia.

== Career ==
Born in Foz do Iguaçu, Paraná, Luiz Gustavo joined Vasco da Gama's youth sides in 2021, for the under-15 squad. On 14 October 2022, he signed his first professional contract with the club.

On 5 July 2024, Luiz Gustavo further extended his link with the Cruzmaltino until 2028. He made his first team debut the following 11 January, starting in a 1–1 Campeonato Carioca away draw against Nova Iguaçu, as most of the first team players were away on pre-season.

== Career statistics ==
As of 13 November 2026

Appearances and goals by club, season and competition
Club	Season	League			State League		National Cup		Continental		Other		Total	
Club	Season	Division	Apps	Goals	Apps	Goals	Apps	Goals	Apps	Goals	Apps	Goals	Apps	Goals
Vasco da Gama	2025	Série A	5	0	3	0	1	0	2 (Note: Appearance(s) in Copa Sudamericana)	0	—		11	0
Bahia	2025	Série A	0	0	—		—		—		—		0	0
Bahia	2026	Série A	0	0	5	0	0	0	0	0	—		5	0
Bahia	Total		0	0	5	0	0	0	0	0	—		5	0
Career total			5	0	8	0	1	0	2	0	0	0	16	0

== Honours ==
Bahia

- Campeonato Baiano: 2026
