= Esporte Clube Bahia =

Brazilian association football club based in Salvador, Bahia

Bahia
- Full name: Esporte Clube Bahia
- Nicknames: Esquadrão de Aço (Steel Squad); Tricolor Baiano (Bahia's Tricolor); Bahêa
- Founded: 1 January 1931; 95 years ago
- Ground: Arena Fonte Nova
- Capacity: 50,025
- SAF Owner: City Football Group (90%); Others (10%)
- President: Emerson Ferretti
- Head coach: Rogério Ceni
- League: Campeonato Brasileiro Série A Campeonato Baiano
- 2025 2025: Série A, 7th of 20; Baiano, 1st of 10 (champions)
- Website: www.esporteclubebahia.com.br
Home colours	Away colours	Third colours

Clubs owned by CFG Listed in order of acquisition/foundation. Bold indicates the club was founded by CFG. * indicates the club was acquired by CFG. § indicates the club is co-owned. † indicates the club is no longer owned by CFG.
2008	(England) Manchester City*
2009–2012
2013	(United States) **New York City FC**^{§}
2014	(Australia) Melbourne City*
2014	(Japan) Yokohama F. Marinos*^{†}
2015–2016
2017	(Uruguay) Montevideo City*
2017	(Spain) Girona*^{§}
2018
2019	(China) Shenzhen Peng City*^{§}
2019	(India) Mumbai City^{†}
2020	(Belgium) Lommel*
2020	(France) Troyes*
2021
2022	(Italy) Palermo*^{§}
2023	(Brazil) Bahia*^{§}

Esporte Clube Bahia (Portuguese pronunciation: [isˈpɔʁtʃi ˈklubi baˈi.ɐ]) is a Brazilian professional football club based in Salvador, Bahia. Founded in 1931, the club competes in the Campeonato Baiano, the Bahia's premier state league, and in the Campeonato Brasileiro Série A, the highest division of the Brazilian football league system. The club's home uniform consists of white shirts with blue shorts and red socks.

Bahia is considered for many as one of the biggest clubs in the Northeast region of Brazil and outside the Big Twelve. The club won a record of 52 state league titles, and a record of five Copa do Nordeste titles. In national level, Bahia has won the Campeonato Brasileiro Série A in 1959 and 1988.

Bahia had played its home games with 66,080 people capacity Estádio Fonte Nova from 1951 to 2007, when a section of the stadium collapsed killing seven Bahia supporters. The club played at the Joia da Princesa stadium in the city of Feira de Santana in 2008, and from 2009 to 2013 at the Estádio de Pituaçu in Salvador. With the reopening of the Fonte Nova stadium in 2013 as the Arena Fonte Nova, a modern arena built for the 2014 FIFA World Cup, Bahia resumed playing its matches there.

In December 2022, it was announced that City Football Group, a subsidiary of Abu Dhabi United Group, had bought a majority stake of Bahia's SAF, after the takeover was approved in a voting session between club members. The acquisition was completed in May 2023, as CFG officially acquired 90% of the club's shares.

== History ==
=== Early years and the first national title ===
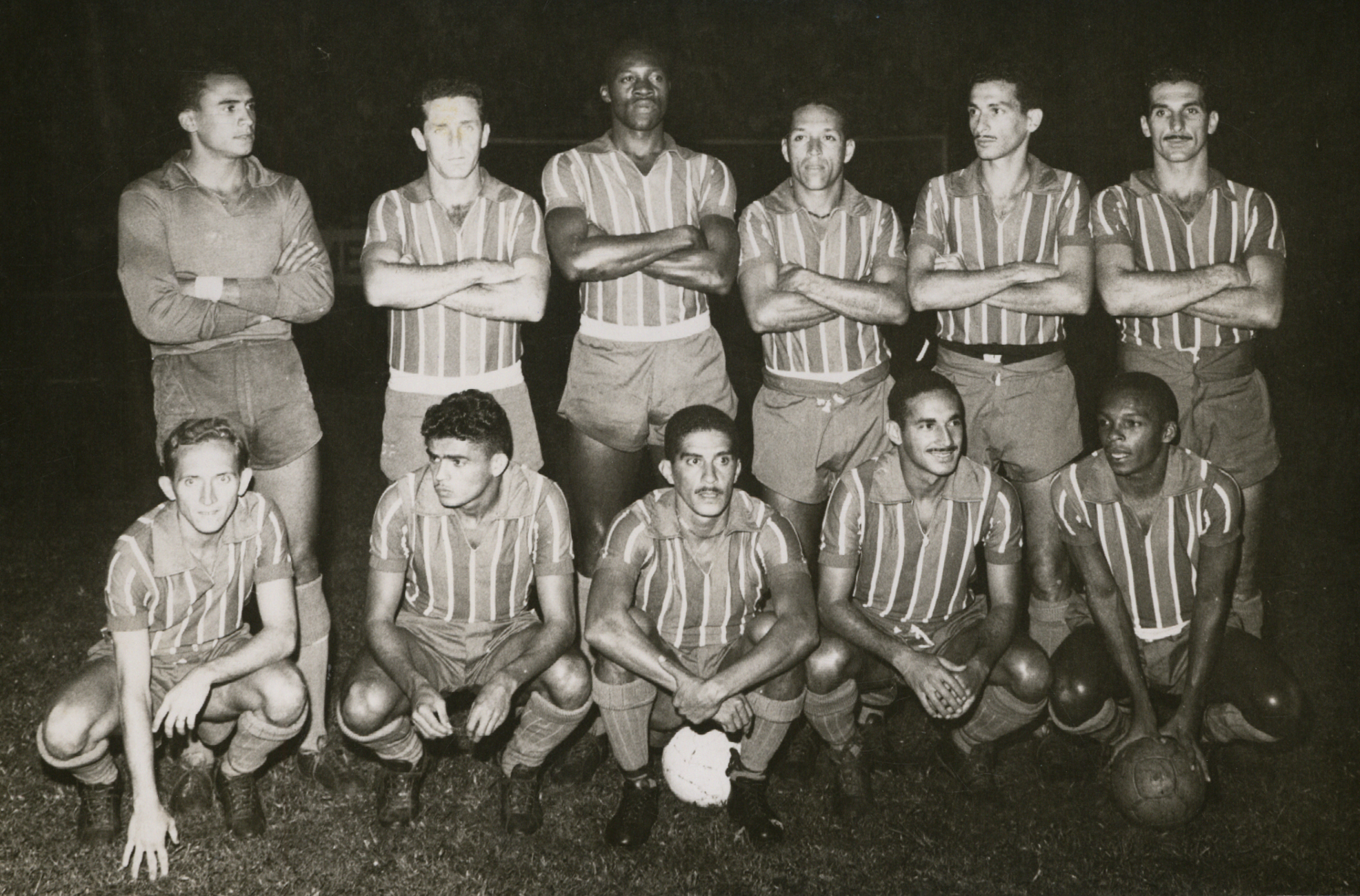
Bahia's team, 1959. National Archives of Brazil.

The Esporte Clube Bahia was founded on the New Year's Day of 1931 when players from two clubs decided to merge. The Associação Atlética da Bahia and the Clube Bahiano de Tênis had decided to discontinue their football divisions. A few years later Bahia became the most popular team in the Northeast of Brazil.

In the club's first year, Bahia won the Torneio Inicio and Bahia State Championship. The first Bahia president was Waldemar Costa, a doctor. Bahia's crest is based on Corinthians'. Bahia's state flag, created by Raimundo Magalhães, was used in place of the São Paulo state flag.

The team was founded with the motto "Nasceu para Vencer" (Born to Win). Bahia won 50 State Championships, 21 more than the Vitória (their rival club), and was the first club to participate in Taça Libertadores da America in 1960.

Between 1959 and 1963, and in 1968, the club represented the state of Bahia in Taça Brasil (the precursor of the Brazilian Championship), winning the title in 1959 and finishing as runner-up in 1961 and 1963.

=== The 1980s and the second national title ===
The 1980s were the best in Bahia's history. Bahia won their second national title in 1988, finishing 5th in 1986 and 4th in 1990.

In 1988, Bahia won its second Brazilian Championship against the Internacional from Porto Alegre Bahia won the first leg in Salvador by 2–1. The second leg ended in an 0–0 tie-in Porto Alegre at the Beira Rio Stadium. After these results, Bahia won the Brasileirão, their second national title. The championship gave Bahia the right to play Copa Libertadores for the third time. It was a shock for the southern press because Salvador is in the Northeast and the victory was over the Internacional, a team from southern Brazil, the region that has the highest Human Development Index in the country.

=== Dark years ===
In 1997, Bahia was relegated to the Série B for the first time in its history after a 0–0 draw against the Juventude at the Fonte Nova stadium. In 1999 Bahia was close to being promoted to the Série A again. Bahia had a very good season but finished in 3rd place, which was not enough to see them promoted.

In 2000, due to bribery scandals involving clubs such as the São Paulo and the Internacional, the team returned to the Brazilian First Division, invited by the Clube dos 13, along with the Fluminense, which was made a scapegoat for the controversy and was nationally victimized by the media (see Copa João Havelange).

In 2002 the bank that had sponsored the team went bankrupt and the Bahia began a descent down the Brazilian football pyramid. After the title of the Northeast Cup in 2001 and 2002, Bahia performed poorly in 2003 and was relegated to the Série B for the second time in the club's history. In 2004, the team was close to getting promoted to the Série A again, finishing 4th. In order to be promoted, Bahia would have to win the final match against the Brasiliense, but the referee Paulo César de Oliveira was assigned to that match and many people say he was all but fair on that day. In 2005, the club again competed in the Série B, finishing in 18th place, and was relegated to the Série C for the first time in the club's history.

=== Fênix tricolor (tricolored phoenix) ===
Bahia finished 2007 among the first four teams of the Third Division and was promoted to the Second Division for the 2008 season. The Bahia began strongly, but in the last game of the 3rd stage of the Série C against the already-eliminated Fast Club, Bahia needed a win to advance to the final. The victory came in the last minute of the game with a goal scored by Charles. In the final, the team finished the third division in 2nd place, only losing the title in the final round. This moment is called the "Fênix Tricolor" amongst Bahia fans. The phoenix represents Bahia rising from the ashes.

Despite playing in the Third Division of Brazilian football in 2007, Bahia had the largest average attendance in Brazil: 40,400 people per match. No club in the Third, the Second, or even the First Division was able to match it. However, this is not unusual for Bahia, having also achieved the biggest average attendance in Brazil in 2004 (Second Division), 1988 (First Division), 1986 (First Division), and 1985 (First Division).

=== Recent years and CFG takeover ===
From 2010 to 2014 Bahia remained in the first division. In 2013, a fan takeover lead the club to pursue more left-wing and socially engaged politics, focusing on racism, LGBTQ rights, the demarcation of indigenous lands and the treatment of female fans in football stadiums. At the same time, they have managed to reduce ticket prices, increase revenues, pay off some of the debt that was crippling the club and improve their results on the pitch.

In 2014 they were relegated to the second division again but came back in 2016. After 22 years out of international competition, Bahia returned in 2012 when they qualified for the Copa Sul-Americana, and seven more times, the last in 2021. In addition, they won the 2012, 2014, 2015 state championship and in 2023 he won his 50th title.

In February 2018 the intense rivalry between Bahia and Esporte Clube Vitória drew international attention when nine players (four from Bahia and five from Vitória) were shown the red card in a State Championship match.

In December 2022, it was announced that City Football Group, a subsidiary of Abu Dhabi United Group, had bought majority stake of Bahia, following a voting session between club members that saw 98.6% of voters accept the takeover. The acquisition was completed in May 2023, as CFG officially acquired 90% of the club's shares, with the original administration keeping the remaining 10% of shares, as well as full rights over club heritage items, including shirt colors and the emblem. Bahia became the thirteenth football club to join City Football Group, and the third South American team to ever do so, following Montevideo City Torque and parent club Club Bolívar.

In 2024, CFD Broker Axi had a sponsorship contract; however, the financial details of the deal were not disclosed.

== Symbols ==
=== Logos ===
1931–1940

1940–1959

1959–1979

1979–1985

1985–1988

1985–1988 (variant)

1988–1990

1990–2005

1990–2005 (variant)

2005

2005 (variant)

2005–present

Bahia's colors are blue, red, and white. The blue color pays homage to the Associação Atlética da Bahia; white, to the Clube Baiano de Tênis; and red for the Bahia state flag.

The club's mascot, designed by Ziraldo in 1979.

The club's mascot is called Super-Homem Tricolor (Tricolor Superman), created by Ziraldo in 1979 based on the club's nickname "Esquadrão de Aço" (Steel Squad) and wears a costume very similar to the original Superman's costume.

== Stadium ==
Bahia played at the old Fonte Nova stadium from its opening in 1951 until 25 November 2007, when during a game against Vila Nova (which sealed Bahia's promotion from the Série C to the Série B), a section of the upper tier of the stadium collapsed. Seven people died and more than 30 were injured.

After that episode, the state government closed the stadium and declared that it would be demolished. The old stadium was imploded on 29 August 2010. The Arena Fonte Nova was built on the site for the 2014 FIFA World Cup, and it opened on 5 April 2013. Bahia has played its home games at the arena ever since.

Some notable games at the old Fonte Nova include:

- Bahia : Internacional 2–1 (Série A – Final – 1988)
- Bahia : Fluminense 2–1 (Série A – Semi-finals – 1988)
- Bahia : Flamengo 4–1 (Série A – 2000)
- Bahia : Sport Recife 3–1 (Northeast Cup – Final – 2001)
- Bahia : Fast Club 1–0 (Série C – 3rd Stage – 2007)

== League record ==
=== National league ===
Season	Tier	Division	Place	Copa do Brasil
1968	1	A	16th	
1969	1	A	11th	
1970	1	A	11th	
1971	1	A	11th	
1972	1	A	13th	
1973	1	A	17th	
1974	1	A	20th	
1975	1	A	25th	
1976	1	A	8th	
1977	1	A	11th	
1978	1	A	7th	
1979	1	A	50th	
1980	1	A	26th	
1981	1	A	16th	
1982	1	A	14th	
1983	1	A	21st	
1984	1	A	27th	
1985	1	A	12th	
1986	1	A	5th	
1987	1	A	11th	

Season	Tier	Division	Place	Copa do Brasil
1988	1	A	1st	
1989	1	A	18th	Quarterfinals
1990	1	A	4th	Quarterfinals
1991	1	A	13th	
1992	1	A	18th	Round of 16
1993	1	A	17th	
1994	1	A	7th	Round of 16
1995	1	A	17th	Round of 16
1996	1	A	22nd	First round
1997	1	A	23rd	Second round
1998	2	B	18th	Round of 16
1999	2	B	3rd	Quarterfinals
2000	1	A	14th	Round of 16
2001	1	A	8th	Round of 16
2002	1	A	19th	Quarterfinals
2003	1	A	24th	Round of 16
2004	2	B	3rd	
2005	2	B	18th	First round
2006	3	C	6th	First round
2007	3	C	2nd	Round of 16

Season	Tier	Division	Place	Copa do Brasil
2008	2	B	10th	First round
2009	2	B	12th	Second round
2010	2	B	3rd	Second round
2011	1	A	14th	Round of 16
2012	1	A	15th	Quarterfinals
2013	1	A	12th	Second round
2014	1	A	18th	Third round
2015	2	B	9th	Third round
2016	2	B	4th	Second round
2017	1	A	12th	Second round
2018	1	A	11th	Quarterfinals
2019	1	A	11th	Quarterfinals
2020	1	A	14th	First round
2021	1	A	18th	Round of 16
2022	2	B	3rd	Round of 16
2023	1	A	16th	Quarterfinals
2024	1	A	8th	Quarterfinals
2025	1	A	7th	Quarterfinals

- **46** seasons in the Campeonato Brasileiro Série A
- **10** seasons in the Campeonato Brasileiro Série B
- **2** seasons in the Campeonato Brasileiro Série C

=== Regional leagues ===
Season	Tier	Division	Place
1931	1	A	3rd
1932	1	A	2nd
1933	1	A	1st
1934	1	A	1st
1935	1	A	3rd
1936	1	A	1st
1937	1	A	4th
1938	1	A	1st
1939	1	A	4th
1940	1	A	1st
1941	1	A	2nd
1942	1	A	3rd
1943	1	A	4th
1944	1	A	5th
1945	1	A	1st
1946	1	A	5th
1947	1	A	1st
1948	1	A	1st
1949	1	A	1st
1950	1	A	1st

Season	Tier	Division	Place	Taça Brasil
1951	1	A	3rd	
1952	1	A	1st	
1953	1	A	2nd	
1954	1	A	1st	
1955	1	A	2nd	
1956	1	A	1st	
1957	1	A	2nd	
1958	1	A	1st	
1959	1	A	1st	Champions
1960	1	A	1st	Zone finals
1961	1	A	1st	Runners-up
1962	1	A	1st	Zone semififinals
1963	1	A	2nd	Runners-up
1964	1	A	2nd	
1965	1	A	5th	
1966	1	A	6th	
1967	1	A	1st	
1968	1	A	4th	Zone finals
1969	1	A	2nd	
1970	1	A	1st	

Season	Tier	Division	Place
1971	1	A	1st
1972	1	A	2nd
1973	1	A	1st
1974	1	A	1st
1975	1	A	1st
1976	1	A	1st
1977	1	A	1st
1978	1	A	1st
1979	1	A	1st
1980	1	A	3rd
1981	1	A	1st
1982	1	A	1st
1983	1	A	1st
1984	1	A	1st
1985	1	A	2nd
1986	1	A	1st
1987	1	A	1st
1988	1	A	1st
1989	1	A	2nd
1990	1	A	3rd

Season	Tier	Division	Place	Copa do Nordeste
1991	1	A	1st	
1992	1	A	2nd	
1993	1	A	1st	
1994	1	A	1st	Semifinals
1995	1	A	3rd	
1996	1	A	3rd	
1997	1	A	2nd	Runners-up
1998	1	A	1st	Second round
1999	1	A	1st	Runners-up
2000	1	A	2nd	Group stage
2001	1	A	1st	Champions
2002	1	A	3rd	Champions
2003	1	A	9th	
2004	1	A	2nd	
2005	1	A	2nd	
2006	1	A	3rd	
2007	1	A	2nd	
2008	1	A	2nd	
2009	1	A	2nd	
2010	1	A	2nd	First round

Season	Tier	Division	Place	Copa do Nordeste
2011	1	A	3rd	
2012	1	A	1st	
2013	1	A	2nd	Group stage
2014	1	A	1st	Group stage
2015	1	A	1st	Runners-up
2016	1	A	2nd	Semifinals
2017	1	A	2nd	Champions
2018	1	A	1st	Runners-up
2019	1	A	1st	Group stage
2020	1	A	1st	Runners-up
2021	1	A	4th	Champions
2022	1	A	6th	Group stage
2023	1	A	1st	Group stage
2024	1	A	2nd	Semifinals
2025	1	A	1st	Champions
2026	1	A	1st	

== Honours ==
=== Official tournaments ===
National
Competitions	Titles	Seasons
Campeonato Brasileiro Série A	2	1959, 1988
Regional
Competitions	Titles	Seasons
Copa do Nordeste	**5**^{s}	2001, 2002, 2017, 2021, 2025
State
Competitions	Titles	Seasons
Campeonato Baiano	**52**	1931, 1933, 1934, 1936, 1938, 1940, 1944, 1945, 1947, 1948, 1949, 1950, 1952, 1954, 1956, 1958, 1959, 1960, 1961, 1962, 1967, 1970, 1971, 1973, 1974, 1975, 1976, 1977, 1978, 1979, 1981, 1982, 1983, 1984, 1986, 1987, 1988, 1991, 1993, 1994, 1998, 1999, 2001, 2012, 2014, 2015, 2018, 2019, 2020, 2023, 2025, 2026

- record
- ^{s} shared record

=== Others tournaments ===
==== International ====
- Friendship Cup (1): 1959
- Copa Renner (1): 1997

==== National ====
- Torneio Quadrangular de Salvador (7): 1950, 1952, 1953, 1954-I, 1960, 1961-I, 1961-II
- Torneio Octávio Mangabeira (1): 1951
- Torneio Triangular Luis Viana Filho (1): 1971
- Torneio Maria Quitéria (1): 1998

==== Regional and Inter-state ====
- Zona Norte-Nordeste da Taça Brasil (3): 1959, 1961, 1963
- Torneio dos Campeões do Nordeste (1): 1948

==== State ====
- Torneio Início da Bahia (9): 1931, 1932, 1934, 1937, 1938, 1951, 1964, 1967, 1979

=== Runners-up ===
- Campeonato Brasileiro Série A (2): 1961, 1963
- Campeonato Brasileiro Série C (1): 2007
- Torneio Heleno Nunes (1): 1984
- Copa do Nordeste (5): 1997, 1999, 2015, 2018, 2020
- Campeonato Baiano (23): 1941, 1955, 1957, 1963, 1964, 1969, 1972, 1985, 1989, 1992, 1996, 1997, 2000, 2004, 2005, 2007, 2008, 2009, 2010, 2013, 2016, 2017, 2024
- Taça Estado da Bahia (2): 2004, 2006

== Performance in CONMEBOL competitions ==
- **Copa Libertadores: 5 appearances**

1960: Preliminary round
1964: Preliminary round
1989: Quarter-finals
2025: Group stage
2026: Second qualifying stage

- **Copa Sudamericana: 9 appearances**

2012: Second stage
2013: Round of 16
2014: Round of 16
2015: Second stage
2018: Quarter-finals
2019: First stage
2020: Quarter-finals
2021: Group stage
2025: Knockout round play-offs

== Current squad ==
=== First team ===
As of 22 September 2026

Note: Flags indicate national team as defined under FIFA eligibility rules; some limited exceptions apply. Players may hold more than one non-FIFA nationality.

No.	Pos.	Nation	Player
1	GK	BRA	Ronaldo
3	DF	ESP	Marco Moreno
4	DF	BRA	Kanu
5	MF	URU	Nicolás Acevedo
6	MF	BRA	Jean Lucas (vice-captain)
7	FW	BRA	Ademir
8	MF	BRA	Caio Alexandre
9	FW	ARG	Alejo Véliz
10	MF	BRA	Éverton Ribeiro (captain)
11	MF	BRA	Rodrigo Nestor
12	FW	BRA	Willian José
14	MF	BRA	Erick
15	MF	URU	Michel Araújo
16	FW	BRA	Erick Pulga
17	GK	ARG	Guido Herrera

No.	Pos.	Nation	Player
18	MF	ARG	Lautaro López (on loan from Montevideo City Torque)
22	GK	BRA	Léo Vieira
23	FW	ARG	Mateo Sanabria
27	FW	BRA	Everaldo (on loan from Fluminense)
31	DF	ARG	Román Gómez
33	DF	BRA	David Duarte
43	DF	BRA	Luiz Gustavo
44	DF	BRA	Marcos Victor
46	DF	BRA	Luciano Juba
57	FW	BRA	Kauê Furquim
63	MF	BRA	David Martins
66	DF	BRA	Zé Guilherme
77	FW	BRA	Ruan Pablo
99	FW	URU	Kike Olivera (on loan from Grêmio)

=== Youth team ===
Note: Flags indicate national team as defined under FIFA eligibility rules; some limited exceptions apply. Players may hold more than one non-FIFA nationality.

No.	Pos.	Nation	Player
54	DF	BRA	Gerald Anjos
55	MF	BRA	Sidney Duarte
58	MF	BRA	Pedrinho
61	GK	BRA	Victor
67	MF	BRA	Wendel Passos
71	FW	BRA	Lyan Araújo

No.	Pos.	Nation	Player
72	FW	BRA	Ryan Nascimento
80	MF	BRA	Roger Gabriel
81	GK	BRA	Fábio Ferreira
83	DF	BRA	Fredi Lippert
89	FW	BRA	Dell

=== Out on loan ===
Note: Flags indicate national team as defined under FIFA eligibility rules; some limited exceptions apply. Players may hold more than one non-FIFA nationality.

No.	Pos.	Nation	Player
—	DF	BRA	Iago (on loan to São Paulo until 31 December 2026)
—	DF	BRA	Gabriel Xavier (on loan to Shenzhen Peng City until 31 December 2026)
—	MF	BRA	Cauly (on loan to São Paulo until 31 December 2026)

No.	Pos.	Nation	Player
—	FW	BRA	Caio Suassuna (on loan to Avaí until 30 November 2026)
—	FW	BRA	Kayky (on loan to Internacional until 31 December 2026)
—	FW	BRA	Vitinho (on loan to Santa Cruz until 30 November 2026)

=== Current staff ===
As of 1 January 2024.

Position	Name
Coaching staff
Head coach	(Brazil) Rogério Ceni
Assistant head coach	(Brazil) Nelson Simões
Assistant head coach	(Brazil) Leandro Macagnan
Assistant head coach	(France) Charles Hembert
Performance coordinator	(Spain) António Bores
Fitness coach	(Brazil) Danilo Augusto
Fitness coach	(Brazil) Roberto Nascimento
Goalkeepers trainer	(Brazil) Eduardo Varjão

== Managers ==
- (Uruguay) Carlos Volante (1959)
- (Brazil) Paulo Amaral (1967–68)
- (Paraguay) Manuel Fleitas Solich (1970–71)
- (Brazil) Sylvio Pirillo (1972)
- (Brazil) Evaristo de Macedo (1973)
- (Brazil) Zezé Moreira (1978–79)
- (Brazil) Aymoré Moreira (1981–82)
- (Brazil) Paulinho (1985), (1987)
- (Brazil) Evaristo de Macedo (1988–89)
- (Brazil) René Simões (1989)
- (Brazil) Candinho (1990–91)
- (Brazil) Gílson Nunes (1992)
- (Brazil) Joel Santana (1994)
- (Brazil) Júlio César Leal (1995)
- (Brazil) Geninho (1997)
- (Brazil) Evaristo de Macedo (1998)
- (Brazil) Joel Santana (1999)
- (Brazil) Evaristo de Macedo (2001)
- (Brazil) Candinho (2002–03)
- (Brazil) Evaristo de Macedo (2003)
- (Brazil) Lula Pereira (Aug 18, 2003 – Oct 27, 2003)
- (Brazil) Edinho (Oct 28, 2003 – Dec 18, 2003)
- (Brazil) Vadão (Jan 11, 2004 – Dec 17, 2004)
- (Brazil) Zetti (April 19, 2005 – June 20, 2005)
- (Brazil) Mauro Fernandes (April 7, 2006 – July 26, 2006)
- (Brazil) Lula Pereira (Oct 16, 2006 – Dec 5, 2006)
- (Brazil) Paulo Comelli (Dec 4, 2007 – June 2, 2008)
- (Brazil) Arturzinho (June 4, 2008 – Feb 2, 2009)
- (Brazil) Ferdinando Teixeira (Oct 4, 2008 – Dec 15, 2008)
- (Brazil) Alexandre Gallo (Dec 16, 2008 – July 7, 2009)
- (Brazil) Paulo Comelli (July 8, 2009 – Aug 1, 2009)
- (Brazil) Sérgio Guedes (Aug 2, 2009 – Sep 28, 2009)
- (Brazil) Paulo Bonamigo (Sep 29, 2009 – Dec 3, 2009)
- (Brazil) Renato Gaúcho (Dec 13, 2009 – Aug 10, 2010)
- (Brazil) Márcio Araújo (Aug 11, 2010 – Dec 2, 2010)
- (Brazil) Rogério Lourenço (Dec 7, 2010 – Feb 7, 2011)
- (Brazil) Vágner Benazzi (Feb 17, 2011 – April 10, 2011)
- (Brazil) Renê Simões (April 14, 2011 – Sep 2, 2011)
- (Brazil) Joel Santana (Sep 4, 2011 – Feb 2, 2012)
- (Brazil) Paulo Roberto Falcão (Feb 7, 2012 – July 20, 2012)
- (Brazil) Caio Júnior (July 21, 2012 – Aug 27, 2012)
- (Brazil) Jorginho (Aug 28, 2012 – April 7, 2013)
- (Brazil) Joel Santana (April 8, 2013 – May 13, 2013)
- (Brazil) Cristóvão Borges (May 17, 2013 – Dec 9, 2013)
- (Brazil) Marquinhos Santos (Dec 12, 2013 – July 28, 2014)
- (Brazil) Gilson Kleina (Aug 13, 2014 – Nov 11, 2014)
- (Brazil) Charles Fabian (2014)
- (Brazil) Sergio Soares (2015)
- (Brazil) Charles Fabian (2015)
- (Brazil) Doriva (2016)
- (Brazil) Guto Ferreira (2016–2017)
- (Brazil) Jorginho (2017)
- (Brazil) Preto Casagrande (2017)
- (Brazil) Paulo César Carpegiani (Oct 2017 - Dec 2017)
- (Brazil) Guto Ferreira (Dec 2017 - Jun 2018)
- (Brazil) Enderson Moreira (Jun 2018 - Mar 2019)
- (Brazil) Roger Machado (Apr 2019 - Sep 2020)
- (Brazil) Mano Menezes (Sep 2020 - Dec 2020)
- (Brazil) Dado Cavalcanti (Dec 2020 - Aug 2021)
- (Argentina) Diego Dabove (Aug 2021 - Oct 2021)
- (Brazil) Guto Ferreira (Oct 2021 - Jun 2022)
- (Brazil) Enderson Moreira (Jun 2022 - Oct 2022 )
- (Brazil) Eduardo Barroca (Oct 2022 - Nov 2022)
- (Portugal) Renato Paiva (Jan 2023 - Sep 2023)
- (Brazil) Rogério Ceni (Sep 2023 - )

== See also ==
- Esporte Clube Bahia (women)
- Dendê Futebol Clube
