= Jean Lucas (footballer, born 1998) =

Brazilian footballer

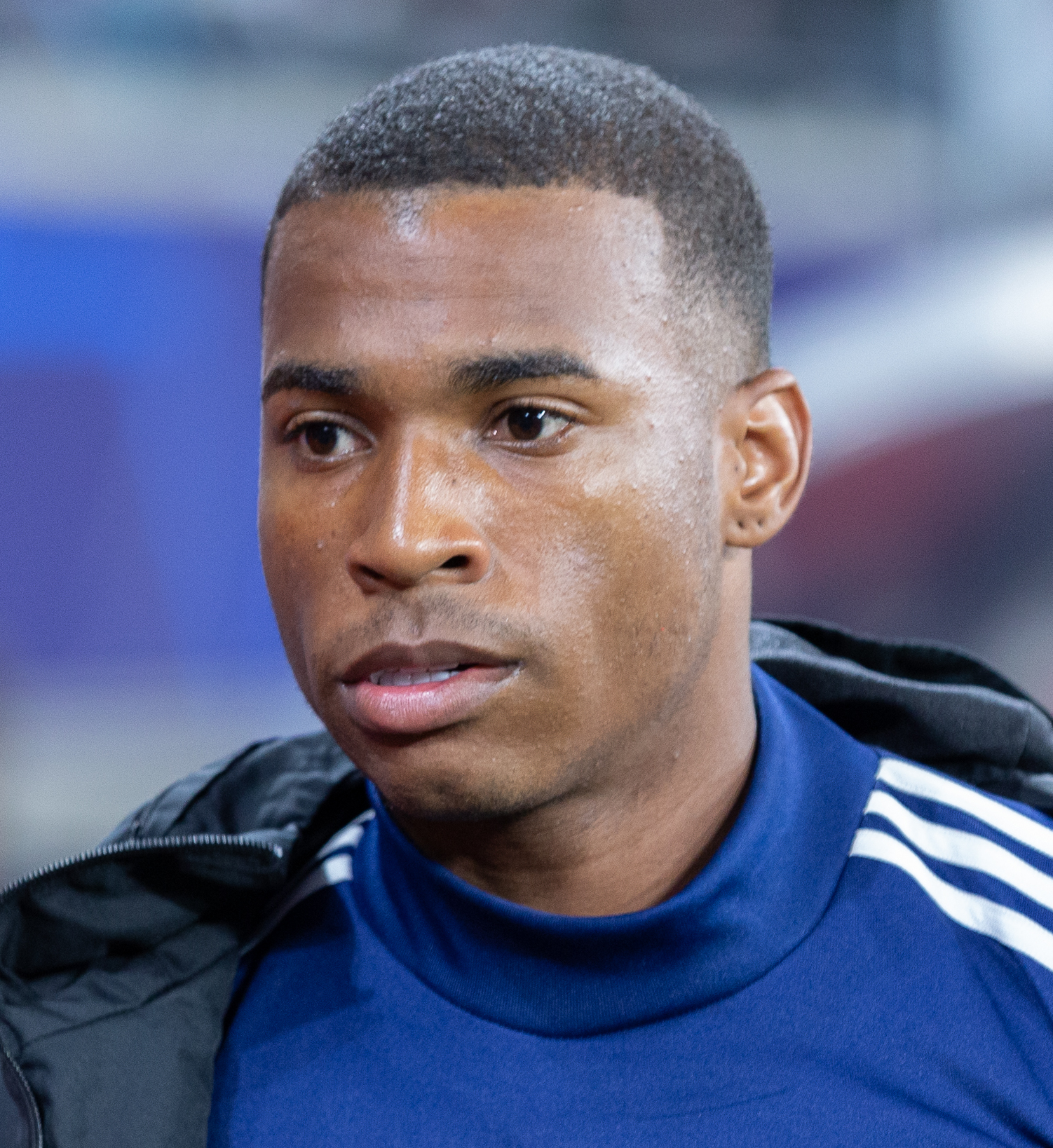
- Jean Lucas with Lyon in 2019

Personal information
- Full name: Jean Lucas de Souza Oliveira
- Date of birth: 22 June 1998 (age 28)
- Place of birth: Rio de Janeiro, Brazil
- Height: 1.81 m (5 ft 11 in)
- Position: Defensive midfielder

Team information
- Current team: Bahia
- Number: 6

Youth career
- 2006–2013: Nova Iguaçu
- 2013–2015: Bonsucesso
- 2015–2017: Flamengo

Senior career*
Years	Team	Apps	(Gls)
2018–2019	Flamengo	16	(0)
2019	→ Santos (loan)	15	(0)
2019–2021	Lyon	19	(1)
2020–2021	Lyon B	1	(0)
2021	→ Brest (loan)	16	(0)
2021–2023	Monaco	34	(1)
2023	Santos	22	(0)
2024–	Bahia	114	(14)

International career^{‡}
2019	Brazil U23	1	(0)
2025–	Brazil	1	(0)
- * Club domestic league appearances and goals as of 15:45, 13 November 2026 (UTC) ‡ National team caps and goals as of 10 September 2025

Jean Lucas de Souza Oliveira (Brazilian Portuguese: [ʒeˈɐ̃ ˈlukaz d(ʒi) ˈsowzɐ oliˈvejɾɐ]; born 22 June 1998), known as Jean Lucas, is a Brazilian professional footballer who plays as a defensive midfielder for Bahia and the Brazil national team.

== Club career ==
=== Flamengo ===
Born in Rio de Janeiro, Jean Lucas started his career with Nova Iguaçu's youth setup. Released at the age of 15, he represented Bonsucesso before joining Flamengo in 2015.

In December 2017, Jean Lucas was definitely promoted to the first team ahead of the 2018 season by manager Reinaldo Rueda. He made his senior debut the following 17 January, starting in a 2–0 Campeonato Carioca away win against Volta Redonda and winning praise for his performance.

Jean Lucas renewed his contract with Flamengo on 16 February 2018, signing until 2021 with a €30 million clause. He made his Série A debut on 22 April, coming on as a late substitute for Lucas Paquetá in a 2–0 home win over América Mineiro.

Jean Lucas made his debut in a continental competition on 24 May 2018, starting in a 0–0 draw against River Plate at the Monumental de Núñez, for the year's Copa Libertadores.

==== Loan to Santos ====
On 9 February 2019, Jean Lucas joined fellow top-tier club Santos on loan until the end of the season. Initially a backup to Alison and Carlos Sánchez, he became a regular starter under Jorge Sampaoli.

=== Lyon ===
On 20 June 2019, Flamengo accepted an €8 million offer from Lyon for Jean Lucas. He officially joined the club five days later, signing a five-year deal.

==== Loan to Brest ====
Having featured sparingly for Lyon, Jean Lucas joined league rivals Brest on loan for the second half of the 2020–21 season in January 2021.

=== Monaco ===
On 2 August 2021, Jean Lucas signed for fellow Ligue 1 club Monaco on a five-year contract. The transfer fee of the deal was of €11 million plus €1 million in bonuses, and Lyon are entitled to 15% of a future sale of Jean Lucas.

=== Santos return ===
On 15 July 2023, Santos announced the return of Jean Lucas on a four-year contract. He made his re-debut for the club eight days later, starting and providing an assist to Marcos Leonardo's opener in a 2–2 home draw against Botafogo.

=== Bahia ===
On 10 January 2024, after Santos' first-ever relegation, Jean Lucas was announced at Bahia on a contract until December 2028.

== Career statistics ==
=== Club ===
As of 13 November 2026

Appearances and goals by club, season and competition
Club	Season	League			State league (Note: Includes Campeonato Carioca, Campeonato Paulista, Campeonato Baiano)		National cup (Note: Includes Copa do Brasil, Coupe de France)		Continental		Other		Total	
Club	Season	Division	Apps	Goals	Apps	Goals	Apps	Goals	Apps	Goals	Apps	Goals	Apps	Goals
Flamengo	2018	Série A	14	0	5	0	2	0	2 (Note: Appearances in Copa Libertadores)	0	—		23	0
Flamengo	2019	Série A	0	0	2	0	0	0	0	0	—		2	0
Flamengo	Total		14	0	7	0	2	0	2	0	—		25	0
Santos (loan)	2019	Série A	9	0	5	0	6	0	—		—		20	0
Lyon	2019–20	Ligue 1	11	1	—		3	0	1 (Note: Appearance in UEFA Champions League)	0	2 (Note: Appearances in Coupe de la Ligue)	2	17	3
Lyon	2020–21	Ligue 1	8	0	—		0	0	—		—		8	0
Lyon	Total		19	1	—		3	0	1	0	2	2	25	3
Lyon B	2019–20	National 2	1	0	—		—		—		—		1	0
Brest (loan)	2020–21	Ligue 1	16	0	—		1	0	—		—		17	0
Monaco	2021–22	Ligue 1	28	1	—		2	1	9 (Note: Two appearances in UEFA Champions League, seven appearances in UEFA Europa League)	0	—		39	2
Monaco	2022–23	Ligue 1	6	0	—		0	0	4 (Note: One appearance in UEFA Champions League, three appearances in UEFA Europa League)	0	—		10	0
Monaco	Total		34	1	—		2	1	13	0	—		49	2
Santos	2023	Série A	22	0	—		—		—		—		22	0
Bahia	2024	Série A	36	3	8	2	8	2	—		9 (Note: All appearances in Copa do Nordeste)	2	61	9
Bahia	2025	Série A	34	3	4	0	6	0	11 (Note: Ten appearances and four goals in Copa Libertadores, one appearance in Copa Sudamericana)	4	5	0	60	7
Bahia	2026	Série A	29	4	3	2	2	0	2	0	—		36	6
Bahia	Total		99	10	15	4	16	2	13	4	14	2	157	22
Career total			214	12	27	4	30	3	29	4	16	4	356	27

== Honours ==
Lyon

- Coupe de la Ligue runner-up: 2019–20

Bahia

- Campeonato Baiano: 2025, 2026
- Copa do Nordeste: 2025
