= Mateo Sanabria =

Argentine footballer

Personal information
- Date of birth: 31 March 2004 (age 22)
- Place of birth: Lomas de Zamora, Buenos Aires, Argentina
- Height: 1.78 m (5 ft 10 in)
- Position: Winger

Team information
- Current team: Bahia
- Number: 23

Youth career
- Lanús

Senior career*
Years	Team	Apps	(Gls)
2022–2024	Lanús	25	(2)
2023–2024	→ Central Córdoba SdE (loan)	28	(4)
2024–2025	Al Ain	21	(3)
2025–	Bahia	30	(4)
- * Club domestic league appearances and goals as of 21:42, 12 November 2026 (UTC)

Mateo Sanabria (born 31 March 2004) is an Argentine professional footballer who plays as a winger for Esporte Clube Bahia.

== Career ==
Due to a minor COVID-19 outbreak in the Lanús squad during pre-season, Sanabria was called up for first team training in January 2022.

== Career statistics ==
As of 12 November 2026

Club	Season	League			Cup (Note: Includes Copa Argentina, UAE President's Cup, Copa do Brasil)		Continental		State league (Note: Includes Campeonato Baiano)		Other		Total	
Club	Season	Division	Apps	Goals	Apps	Goals	Apps	Goals	Apps	Goals	Apps	Goals	Apps	Goals
Lanús	2022	Primera División	19 (Note: Soccerway counts Copa de la Liga Profesional appearances as league appearances.)	1	1	0	2 (Note: Appearance(s) in Copa Sudamericana)	0	—		—		22	1
Lanús	2023	Primera División	2	0	0	0	0	0	—		—		2	0
Lanús	2024	Primera División	4	1	0	0	0	0	—		—		4	1
Lanús	Total		25	2	1	0	2	0	—		—		28	2
Central Córdoba SdE (loan)	2023	Primera División	11	3	0	0	—		—		—		11	3
Central Córdoba SdE (loan)	2024	Primera División	17	1	1	1	—		—		—		18	2
Central Córdoba SdE (loan)	Total		28	4	1	1	—		—		—		29	5
Al Ain	2024–25	UAE Pro League	21	3	2	1	5 (Note: Appearance(s) in AFC Champions League Elite)	1	—		5 (Note: Three appearances and one goal in UAE League Cup, one appearance in FIFA Intercontinental Cup, one appearance in FIFA Club World Cup)	1	33	6
Bahia	2025	Série A	10	1	1	0	—		—		—		11	1
Bahia	2026	Série A	16	2	1	0	1 (Note: Appearance(s) in Copa Libertadores)	0	4	1	—		22	3
Bahia	Total		26	3	2	0	1	0	4	1	—		33	4
Career total			100	12	6	2	8	1	4	1	5	1	123	17

== Honours ==
Bahia

- Campeonato Baiano: 2026
