= Ronaldo (footballer, born August 1996) =

Brazilian footballer

Personal information
- Full name: Ronaldo de Oliveira Straza
- Date of birth: 22 August 1996 (age 30)
- Place of birth: Salvador, Brazil
- Height: 1.94 m (6 ft 4 in)
- Position: Goalkeeper

Team information
- Current team: Bahia
- Number: 1

Youth career
- 2011–2017: Vitória

Senior career*
| Years | Team | Apps | (Gls) |
| 2015–2021 | Vitória | 70 | (0) |
| 2022–2025 | Atlético Goianiense | 123 | (0) |
| 2025 | → Bahia (loan) | 28 | (0) |
| 2026– | Bahia | 30 | (0) |
- * Club domestic league appearances and goals as of 21:33, 10 November 2026 (UTC)

Ronaldo de Oliveira Strada (born 22 August 1996), or simply known as Ronaldo, is a Brazilian footballer who plays as a goalkeeper for Bahia.

== Club career ==
Born in Salvador, Ronaldo joined Vitória's youth setup at the age of 14. He was promoted to the main squad in 2015, but only made his first team debut on 24 May 2018, starting in a 0–0 home draw against Sampaio Corrêa, for the year's Copa do Nordeste.

After starting the 2018 campaign as a third-choice behind Fernando Miguel and Caíque, Ronaldo became a backup option to new signing Elias after Fernando Miguel moved to Vasco da Gama. He then made his Série A debut on 6 June 2018, starting in a 1–0 home win against Chapecoense, and subsequently became the first-choice.

On 3 September 2018, Ronaldo renewed his contract until December 2021.

== Career statistics ==
As of 10 November 2026

Appearances and goals by club, season and competition
| Club | Season | League | | | State League | | Cup | | Continental | | Other | | Total | |
| Club | Season | Division | Apps | Goals | Apps | Goals | Apps | Goals | Apps | Goals | Apps | Goals | Apps | Goals |
|---|---|---|---|---|---|---|---|---|---|---|---|---|---|---|
| Vitória | 2016 | Série A | 0 | 0 | — | | 0 | 0 | — | | — | | 0 | 0 |
| Vitória | 2017 | Série A | 0 | 0 | 0 | 0 | 0 | 0 | — | | 0 | 0 | 0 | 0 |
| Vitória | 2018 | Série A | 20 | 0 | 0 | 0 | 0 | 0 | — | | 1 (Note: Appearance(s) in Copa do Nordeste) | 0 | 21 | 0 |
| Vitória | 2019 | Série B | 7 | 0 | 7 | 0 | 1 | 0 | — | | 4 | 0 | 19 | 0 |
| Vitória | 2020 | Série B | 26 | 0 | 0 | 0 | 3 | 0 | — | | 8 | 0 | 37 | 0 |
| Vitória | 2021 | Série B | 8 | 0 | 2 | 0 | 1 | 0 | — | | 3 | 0 | 14 | 0 |
| Vitória | Total | | 61 | 0 | 9 | 0 | 5 | 0 | — | | 16 | 0 | 91 | 0 |
| Atlético Goianiense | 2022 | Série A | 18 | 0 | 0 | 0 | 4 | 0 | 7 (Note: Appearance(s) in Copa Sudamericana) | 0 | — | | 29 | 0 |
| Atlético Goianiense | 2023 | Série B | 36 | 0 | 15 | 0 | 2 | 0 | — | | — | | 53 | 0 |
| Atlético Goianiense | 2024 | Série A | 32 | 0 | 17 | 0 | 4 | 0 | — | | — | | 53 | 0 |
| Atlético Goianiense | 2025 | Série B | — | | 5 | 0 | 1 | 0 | — | | — | | 6 | 0 |
| Atlético Goianiense | Total | | 86 | 0 | 37 | 0 | 11 | 0 | 7 | 0 | — | | 141 | 0 |
| Bahia | 2025 | Série A | 28 | 0 | — | | 4 | 0 | 2 (Note: Appearance(s) in Copa Libertadores) | 0 | 6 | 0 | 40 | 0 |
| Bahia | 2026 | Série A | 25 | 0 | 5 | 0 | 0 | 0 | 2 | 0 | — | | 32 | 0 |
| Bahia | Total | | 53 | 0 | 5 | 0 | 4 | 0 | 4 | 0 | 6 | 0 | 72 | 0 |
| Career total | | | 200 | 0 | 51 | 0 | 20 | 0 | 11 | 0 | 22 | 0 | 304 | 0 |

== Honours ==
Bahia

- Copa do Nordeste: 2025
- Campeonato Baiano: 2026
