= Erick (footballer, born November 1997) =

Brazilian footballer

Personal information
- Full name: Erick Luis Conrado Carvalho
- Date of birth: 14 November 1997 (age 28)
- Place of birth: Nova Lima, Brazil
- Height: 1.78 m (5 ft 10 in)
- Position: Defensive midfielder

Team information
- Current team: Bahia
- Number: 14

Youth career
- 2014–2015: Villa Nova
- 2016: Arapongas

Senior career*
Years	Team	Apps	(Gls)
2016	Arapongas	16	(3)
2017–2018	PSTC	15	(1)
2017–2018	→ Operário Ferroviário (loan)	29	(9)
2019–2024	Athletico Paranaense	208	(19)
2025–	Bahia	60	(11)
- * Club domestic league appearances and goals as of 14:17, 11 November 2026 (UTC)

Erick Luis Conrado Carvalho (born 14 November 1997), simply known as Erick, is a Brazilian footballer who plays as a defensive midfielder for Bahia.

== Career ==
=== Early career ===
Born in Nova Lima, Minas Gerais, Erick played for social projects in his hometown before having a trial at Figueirense at the age of 17. After being rejected, he returned to his hometown and joined the youth categories of Villa Nova before moving to Arapongas in 2016, where he would make his senior debut in the year's Campeonato Paranaense Série Bronze. Initially a right-back, he played as a centre-back before establishing himself as a defensive midfielder.

Erick moved to PSTC ahead of the 2017 season, being regularly used before moving to Operário Ferroviário on loan for the 2017 Taça FPF. He remained at the latter club for the 2018 campaign, helping the club to win both the 2018 Campeonato Paranaense Série Prata and the 2018 Série C.

=== Athletico Paranaense ===
On 28 September 2018, it was reported that Athletico Paranaense reached an agreement to sign Erick. He was announced by his new club on 9 January 2019, being initially assigned to an under-23 squad for the 2019 Campeonato Paranaense, and made his club debut ten days later, in a 1–0 home loss to Cascavel CR.

Erick scored his first goal for Furacão on 27 January 2019, netting the opener in a 2–0 away win over Rio Branco-PR; it was also his first start for the club. He later started to feature with the main squad, and made his Série A debut on 5 May, starting in a 1–1 away draw against Chapecoense.

Erick scored his first goal in the top tier on 10 October 2019, netting Athletico's second in a 2–2 away draw against Corinthians. The following 14 January, after establishing himself as a first team member, he renewed his contract with the club until 2025.

Erick had his best individual inputs for Athletico during the 2023 season, where he scored eight goals and provided eight assists. On 11 April 2024, he further extended his link until 2026, and played his 250th match for the club in June.

== Career statistics ==
As of 11 November 2026.

Club	Season	League			State League		Cup		Continental		Other		Total	
Club	Season	Division	Apps	Goals	Apps	Goals	Apps	Goals	Apps	Goals	Apps	Goals	Apps	Goals
Arapongas	2016	Paranaense Série Bronze	—		16	3	—		—		—		16	3
PSTC	2017	Série D	6	0	9	1	2	0	—		—		17	1
Operário Ferroviário (loan)	2017	Série D	—		—		—		—		10 (Note: Appearance(s) in Taça FPF)	2	10	2
Operário Ferroviário (loan)	2018	Série C	20	4	9	5	—		—		—		29	9
Operário Ferroviário (loan)	Total		20	4	9	5	—		—		10	2	39	11
Athletico Paranaense	2019	Série A	14	1	14	2	1	0	1 (Note: Appearance(s) in Copa Libertadores)	0	0	0	30	3
Athletico Paranaense	2020	Série A	19	0	6	0	2	1	8	0	1 (Note: Appearance(s) in Supercopa do Brasil)	0	36	1
Athletico Paranaense	2021	Série A	25	0	2	1	7	0	10 (Note: Appearance(s) in Copa Sudamericana)	1	—		44	2
Athletico Paranaense	2022	Série A	31	3	3	0	5	1	9	1	2 (Note: Appearance(s) in Recopa Sudamericana)	0	50	5
Athletico Paranaense	2023	Série A	33	4	12	3	6	0	8	1	—		59	8
Athletico Paranaense	2024	Série A	34	3	15	2	6	0	9	1	—		64	6
Athletico Paranaense	Total		156	11	52	8	27	2	45	4	3	0	283	25
Bahia	2025	Série A	16	1	9	2	1	0	6	0	5 (Note: Appearance(s) in Copa do Nordeste)	4	37	7
Bahia	2026	Série A	26	4	9	4	2	1	1	0	—		38	9
Bahia	Total		42	5	18	6	3	1	7	0	5	4	75	16
Career total			224	20	104	23	32	3	52	4	18	6	427	56

== Honours ==
Operário Ferroviário

- Campeonato Paranaense Série Prata: 2018
- Campeonato Brasileiro Série C: 2018

Athletico Paranaense

- Campeonato Paranaense: 2019, 2020, 2023, 2024
- Copa Suruga Bank: 2019
- Copa do Brasil: 2019
- Copa Sudamericana: 2021

Bahia

- Campeonato Baiano: 2025, 2026
- Copa do Nordeste: 2025
