= Wendel Passos =

Brazilian footballer

Personal information
- Full name: Wendel Silva Passos
- Date of birth: 28 February 2006 (age 20)
- Place of birth: Brazil
- Height: 1.74 m (5 ft 9 in)
- Position: Defensive midfielder

Team information
- Current team: Bahia
- Number: 67

Youth career
- 2020–: Bahia

Senior career*
Years	Team	Apps	(Gls)
2024–	Bahia	6	(0)
- * Club domestic league appearances and goals as of 2 June 2026 (UTC)

Wendel Silva Passos (born 28 February 2006), known as Wendel Passos or just Wendel, is a Brazilian footballer who plays for Bahia. Mainly a defensive midfielder, he can also play as a right-back.

== Career ==
Having joined the youth categories of Bahia in 2020, Wendel made his senior debut on 21 January 2024, coming on as a late substitute for Jota in a 3–3 Campeonato Baiano away draw against Atlético de Alagoinhas, as the club fielded an under-20 squad. Regularly used with the under-20 squad in the following years, he was converted into a right-back during the 2026 season.

Wendel made his Série A debut on 25 October 2026, replacing Rodrigo Nestor in a 1–1 away draw against Santos.

== Career statistics ==
As of 28 October 2026

Club	Season	League			State League		Cup		Continental		Other		Total	
Club	Season	Division	Apps	Goals	Apps	Goals	Apps	Goals	Apps	Goals	Apps	Goals	Apps	Goals
Bahia	2024	Série A	0	0	1	0	0	0	0	0	1 (Note: Appearance(s) in Copa do Nordeste)	0	2	0
Bahia	2025	Série A	0	0	3	0	0	0	0	0	1	0	4	0
Bahia	2026	Série A	1	0	1	0	0	0	0	0	—		2	0
Career total			1	0	5	0	0	0	0	0	2	0	8	0

== Honours ==
Bahia

- Campeonato Baiano: 2025, 2026
