= Cristian Olivera =

Uruguayan footballer (born 2002)

Personal information
- Full name: Cristian Gonzalo Olivera Ibarra
- Date of birth: 17 April 2002 (age 24)
- Place of birth: Montevideo, Uruguay
- Height: 1.70 m (5 ft 7 in)
- Position: Right winger

Team information
- Current team: Bahia (on loan from Grêmio)
- Number: 99

Youth career
- Arapey Mendoza
- Potencia
- Flores Palma
- Danubio (AUFI)
- Cerrito
- Danubio
- Defensor Sporting
- 2018–2019: Rentistas

Senior career*
Years	Team	Apps	(Gls)
2019–2020	Rentistas	32	(6)
2020–2023	Almería	3	(0)
2021	Almería B	13	(0)
2021–2022	→ Peñarol (loan)	15	(0)
2022–2023	→ Boston River (loan)	33	(10)
2023–2025	Los Angeles FC	31	(8)
2025–	Grêmio	26	(3)
2026–	→ Bahia (loan)	31	(3)

International career^{‡}
2017	Uruguay U15	4	(0)
2018–2019	Uruguay U17	19	(4)
2024	Uruguay U23	2	(1)
2023–	Uruguay	12	(0)
Medal record
Men's football
Representing Uruguay
Copa América
Third place	2024 United States
- * Club domestic league appearances and goals as of 20:59, 13 November 2026 (UTC) ‡ National team caps and goals as of 25 March 2025

Cristian Gonzalo Olivera Ibarra (born 17 April 2002), known as Cristian Olivera or "Kike" Olivera, is a Uruguayan professional footballer who plays as a right winger for Campeonato Brasileiro Série A club Bahia, on loan from Grêmio, and the Uruguay national team.

== Club career ==
=== Early career ===
Born in Montevideo, Uruguay, Olivera started his career at the age of three in Club Arapey Mendoza. He subsequently represented Potencia, Club Flores Palma de Baby Fútbol, Club Danubio, Cerrito, Danubio and Defensor Sporting before joining Rentistas in 2018.

=== Rentistas ===
In September 2018, aged just 16, Olivera signed his first professional contract with Rentistas. He made his first team debut for on 5 May of the following year, coming on as a second-half substitute for goalscorer Renato César in a 1–0 Uruguayan Segunda División away win against Central Español.

Olivera scored his first senior goal on 20 July 2019, netting the opener in a 2–1 away defeat of Villa Teresa, and ended the season with three goals in 25 appearances overall, as his club achieved promotion to Primera División. He made his debut in the top tier on 16 February 2020, starting in a 2–0 home success over Nacional.

Olivera scored his first goal in the top tier on 22 February 2020, netting the equalizer in a 3–2 win at Boston River, and was an important unit in Rentistas' start of the campaign, as his club won five of their first ten league matches.

=== Almería ===
On 15 September 2020, Olivera moved abroad for the first time in his career, after signing a five-year deal with Spanish Segunda División side UD Almería for a rumoured fee of €2 million.

Olivera failed to establish himself as a regular option for the Andalusians and was demoted to the reserves in January 2021. On 3 May 2021, he returned to his home country after agreeing to a one-year loan deal with Uruguayan Primera División club Peñarol. This was followed by another loan to Boston River in the same league, starting in 2022.

=== Los Angeles FC ===
On 4 August 2023, Olivera joined Major League Soccer side Los Angeles FC.

=== Grêmio ===
On 14 February, Olivera was acquired from LAFC by Grêmio for $4.5 million. During his stint at Grêmio, Olivera expressed frustration and stated a desire to be transferred to Uruguayan club Nacional.

==== Loan to Bahia ====
In January 2026, Olivera joined Bahia on a one year loan.

== International career ==
In January 2024, Olivera was named in Uruguay's squad for the 2024 CONMEBOL Pre-Olympic Tournament.

== Career statistics ==
=== Club ===
As of 13 November 2026

Appearances and goals by club, season and competition
Club	Season	League			Cup (Note: Includes Copa Uruguay, Copa del Rey, US Open Cup, Copa do Brasil)		Continental		State league (Note: Includes Campeonato Gaúcho, Campeonato Baiano)		Other		Total	
Club	Season	Division	Apps	Goals	Apps	Goals	Apps	Goals	Apps	Goals	Apps	Goals	Apps	Goals
Rentistas	2019	Uruguayan Segunda División	21	3	—		—		—		4 (Note: Appearance(s) in Promotion play-offs)	0	25	3
Rentistas	2020	Uruguayan Primera División	11	3	—		—		—		—		11	3
Rentistas	Total		32	6	—		—		—		4	0	36	6
Almería	2020–21	Segunda División	3	0	1	0	—		—		—		4	0
Almería B	2020–21	Tercera División	13	0	—		—		—		—		13	0
Peñarol (loan)	2021	Uruguayan Primera División	13	0	—		4 (Note: Appearance(s) in Copa Sudamericana)	0	—		—		17	0
Peñarol (loan)	2022	Uruguayan Primera División	2	0	0	0	0	0	—		1 (Note: Appearance(s) in Supercopa Uruguaya)	0	3	0
Peñarol (loan)	Total		15	0	0	0	4	0	—		1	0	20	0
Boston River (loan)	2022	Uruguayan Primera División	12	4	2	0	—		—		—		14	4
Boston River (loan)	2023	Uruguayan Primera División	21	6	0	0	3 (Note: Appearance(s) in Copa Libertadores)	0	—		—		24	6
Boston River (loan)	Total		33	10	2	0	3	0	—		—		38	10
Los Angeles FC	2023	Major League Soccer	10	2	—		—		—		6 (Note: One appearance in Campeones Cup, five appearances in MLS Cup Playoffs)	0	16	2
Los Angeles FC	2024	Major League Soccer	21	6	4	3	—		—		10 (Note: Six appearances and four goals in Leagues Cup, four appearances and one goal in MLS Cup Playoffs)	5	35	14
Los Angeles FC	Total		31	8	4	3	—		—		16	5	51	16
Grêmio	2025	Série A	22	2	4	1	7	1	4	1	—		37	5
Bahia (loan)	2026	Série A	26	2	2	0	2	0	5	1	—		35	3
Career total			175	28	13	4	16	1	9	2	21	5	234	40

=== International ===
As of match played 25 March 2025

Appearances and goals by national team and year
National team	Year	Apps	Goals
Uruguay	2023	3	0
Uruguay	2024	8	0
Uruguay	2025	1	0
Total		12	0

== Honours ==
Peñarol

- Uruguayan Primera División: 2021
- Supercopa Uruguaya: 2022

Los Angeles FC

- US Open Cup: 2024

Bahia

- Campeonato Baiano: 2026

Uruguay

- Copa América third place: 2024
