= 2018 Campeonato Baiano =

114th edition of professional football league in Bahia

Campeonato Baiano
- Season: 2018
- Champions: Bahia
- Relegated: Atlântico
- Série D: Bahia de Feira; Fluminense de Feira; Jacuipense
- Copa do Brasil: Bahia; Vitória; Juazeirense
- Copa do Nordeste: Bahia; Vitória; Juazeirense
- Matches played: 51
- Goals scored: 136 (2.67 per match)
- Top goalscorer: Neílton (Vitória) - 7 goals

The 2018 Campeonato Baiano de Futebol was the 114th edition of Bahia's top professional football league. The competition began on 21 January and ended on 8 April. Bahia won the championship for the 47th time.

== First phase ==
Pos	Team	Pld	W	D	L	GF	GA	GD	Pts	Qualification or relegation
1	Vitória	9	7	1	1	19	9	+10	22	Qualified to Semifinals
2	Bahia	9	6	2	1	21	6	+15	20	Qualified to Semifinals
3	Juazeirense	9	6	1	2	17	10	+7	19	Qualified to Semifinals
4	Bahia de Feira	9	5	2	2	13	10	+3	17	Qualified to Semifinals
5	Fluminense de Feira	9	5	1	3	12	9	+3	16	
6	Jacuipense	9	3	1	5	9	9	0	10	
7	Jequié	9	3	1	5	10	19	−9	10	
8	Jacobina	9	2	1	6	6	14	−8	7	
9	Vitória da Conquista	9	2	0	7	8	20	−12	6	
10	Atlântico	9	0	2	7	9	18	−9	2	Relegated

Updated to match(es) played on March 7, 2018. Source: RSSSF.com
Rules for classification: 1) points; 2) wins; 3) goal difference; 4) number of goals scored.

== Semifinals ==
Team 1	Agg.	Team 2	1st leg	2nd leg
Bahia de Feira	3–4	Vitória	1–1	2–3
Juazeirense	0–3	Bahia	0–0	0–3

== Finals ==
April 1, 2018
16:00 UTC−4

Bahia	2–1	Vitória
Edigar Junio 24'; Vinícius 52'		Luan 27'

Arena Fonte Nova, Salvador
Attendance: 39,086

April 8, 2018
16:00 UTC−4

Vitória	0-1	Bahia
		Élton 48'

Estádio Barradão, Salvador
Attendance: 30,142

Bahia won 3–1 on aggregate.
