= Everaldo (footballer, born 1991) =

Brazilian footballer

Personal information
- Full name: Everaldo Stum
- Date of birth: 5 July 1991 (age 35)
- Place of birth: Garibaldi, Brazil
- Height: 1.81 m (5 ft 11 in)
- Position: Forward

Team information
- Current team: Bahia (on loan from Fluminense)
- Number: 27

Youth career
- 2005–2008: Esportivo
- 2009–2011: Grêmio

Senior career*
Years	Team	Apps	(Gls)
2011–2015	Grêmio	14	(1)
2012	→ Caxias (loan)	10	(0)
2013	→ CSA (loan)	26	(13)
2014	→ Figueirense (loan)	24	(6)
2015	Figueirense	11	(0)
2015	Paysandu	3	(0)
2016	Água Santa	14	(6)
2016	Santa Cruz	3	(0)
2016–2017	Al-Faisaly	15	(5)
2017	Novorizontino	12	(2)
2017	Atlético Goianiense	13	(5)
2017–2019	Querétaro	40	(4)
2019	→ Chapecoense (loan)	40	(15)
2020–2022	Kashima Antlers	80	(24)
2023–2025	Bahia	75	(25)
2025–	Fluminense	37	(3)
2026–	→ Bahia (loan)	21	(6)
- * Club domestic league appearances and goals as of 21:48, 12 November 2026 (UTC)

Everaldo Stum (born 5 July 1991), simply known as Everaldo or Eve, is a Brazilian professional footballer who plays as a forward for Brazilian club Bahia, on loan from Fluminense.

== Career ==
Born in Garibaldi, Rio Grande do Sul, Everaldo graduated from Grêmio's academy, and made his first team debut on 5 November 2011, coming on as a second-half substitute in a 2–0 away loss against Atlético Mineiro, for the Campeonato Brasileiro Série A.

In 2012, Everaldo was loaned to Caxias. In 2013, after returning to Grêmio, he was loaned to CSA where he was top scorer in the 2013 Campeonato Alagoano, scoring 13 goals. His first professional goal came in a 6–0 win over Sport Atalaia. He then returned to Grêmio in the same year.

On 17 April 2014, Everaldo was loaned to Figueirense until the end of the season. He scored his first top-flight goal for Figueirense, in a 1–1 draw with Flamengo. This was the first of 6 goals he went onto score during this season. On 29 April 2015, he returned to Figueira until the end of the 2015 season.

From 2015, Everaldo continued to club hop over the next couple of seasons, playing for five different clubs in Brazil as well as a brief stint in Saudi Arabia with Al Faisaly. Playing for ten clubs over seven seasons (2011–2017), Everaldo had played 153 games and scored 38 goals.

For the 2017–18 season, Everaldo signed for Liga MX side Querétaro. Scoring only 4 goals in 33 appearances in his first season, then 1 in 16 in his second, he was loaned out to Chapecoense in the middle of the Mexican 2018–19 season, in time for the 2019 Brazilian season. He went on to score 17 goals across all competitions for Chapecoense, including his first goal in a continental competition, scoring against Unión La Calera in 1–1 draw in the Copa Sudamericana. His personal best season in terms of goal returns was unfortunately not enough to save Chapecoense from relegation.

In January 2020, Everaldo signed for J.League club Kashima Antlers. He scored his first goal for the club in a 4-2 league win over Yokohama F. Marinos, the first of 18 goals he went on to score in 36 appearances in his debut season for Kashima. He finished the season as second top scorer in the division, only behind MVP Michael Olunga and was awarded a place in the 2020 J.League Best XI – one of two players picked from teams other than league champions Kawasaki Frontale.

Everaldo was unable to replicate his goalscoring form in his second season with Kashima, only scoring one league goal in 28 appearances in 2021. Due to his form, in the second half of the season he lost his place in the starting XI to Ayase Ueda. However, he did end up as top goalscorer in the Emperor's Cup scoring 5 goals in just 4 games.

After three seasons in Japan, in December 2022 it was announced that Everaldo would be returning to Brazil, joining Bahia.

In 2025, Everaldo was transferred from Bahia to Fluminense. On 6 February 2026, Everaldo was loaned from Fluminense back to Bahia.

== Career statistics ==
As of 12 November 2026

Appearances and goals by club, season and competition
Club	Season	League			State league		National cup		League cup		Continental		Other		Total	
Club	Season	Division	Apps	Goals	Apps	Goals	Apps	Goals	Apps	Goals	Apps	Goals	Apps	Goals	Apps	Goals
Grêmio	2011	Série A	1	0	0	0	0	0	—		—		—		1	0
Grêmio	2014	Série A	—		7 (Note: Appearance(s) in Campeonato Gaúcho)	1	—		—		1 (Note: Appearance(s) in Copa Libertadores)	0	—		8	1
Grêmio	2015	Série A	—		6	0	0	0	—		0	0	—		6	0
Grêmio	Total		1	0	13	1	0	0	—		1	0	—		15	1
Caxias (loan)	2012	Série C	4	0	6	0	0	0	—		—		—		10	0
CSA (loan)	2013	Série D	2	0	24 (Note: Appearance(s) in Campeonato Alagoano)	13	1	0	—		—		—		27	13
Figueirense	2014	Série A	24	6	—		1	0	—		—		—		25	6
Figueirense	2015	Série A	11	0	—		4	0	—		—		—		15	0
Figueirense	Total		35	6	—		5	0	—		—		—		40	6
Paysandu	2015	Série B	3	0	—		—		—		—		—		3	0
Água Santa	2016	Paulista	—		14 (Note: Appearance(s) in Campeonato Paulista)	6	—		—		—		—		14	6
Santa Cruz	2016	Série A	3	0	—		—		—		—		—		3	0
Al-Faisaly	2016–17	Saudi Pro League	15	5	—		1	0	—		—		—		16	5
Novorizontino	2017	Paulista	—		12	2	—		—		—		—		12	2
Atlético Goianiense	2017	Série A	13	5	—		0	0	—		—		—		13	5
Querétaro	2017–18	Liga MX	27	4	—		6	0	—		—		—		33	4
Querétaro	2018–19	Liga MX	13	0	—		3	1	—		—		—		16	1
Querétaro	Total		40	4	—		9	1	—		—		—		49	5
Chapecoense (loan)	2019	Série A	28	11	12 (Note: Appearance(s) in Campeonato Catarinense)	4	5	1	—		2 (Note: Appearance(s) in Copa Sudamericana)	1	—		47	17
Kashima Antlers	2020	J1 League	33	18	—		—		2	0	1 (Note: Appearance(s) in AFC Champions League)	0	—		36	18
Kashima Antlers	2021	J1 League	28	1	—		4 (Note: Appearance(s) in Emperor's Cup)	5	6	3	—		—		38	9
Kashima Antlers	2022	J1 League	19	5	—		5	1	3	1	—		—		27	7
Kashima Antlers	Total		80	24	—		9	6	11	4	1	0	—		101	34
Bahia	2023	Série A	33	9	11 (Note: Appearance(s) in Campeonato Baiano)	6	8	2	—		—		8 (Note: Appearance(s) in Copa do Nordeste)	3	60	20
Bahia	2024	Série A	37	8	8	2	6	0	—		—		7	1	58	11
Bahia	2025	Série A	—		4	2	—		—		—		2	1	6	3
Bahia	Total		52	15	23	10	10	2	—		—		17	5	81	25
Fluminense	2025	Série A	28	2	5 (Note: Appearance(s) in Campeonato Carioca)	0	10	4	—		9	2	6 (Note: Appearance(s) in FIFA Club World Cup)	0	58	8
Fluminense	2026	Série A	1	0	3	1	—		—		—		—		4	1
Fluminense	Total		29	2	8	1	10	4	—		9	2	6	0	62	9
Bahia (loan)	2026	Série A	18	4	3	2	2	0	—		2	0	—		25	6
Career total			341	78	121	41	50	12	11	4	15	3	23	5	561	143

== Honours ==
Bahia

- Campeonato Baiano: 2023, 2026

Kashima Antlars

- J.League Best XI: 2020
- J.League Monthly Best Goal: 2022 July
