= Emerson Ferretti =

Brazilian footballer (born 1971)

Personal information
- Full name: Emerson de Souza Ferretti
- Date of birth: 3 September 1971 (age 55)
- Place of birth: Porto Alegre, Rio Grande do Sul, Brazil
- Position: Goalkeeper

Team information
- Current team: Bahia (President)

Youth career
- –1991: Grêmio

Senior career*
Years	Team	Apps	(Gls)
1991–1995	Grêmio	97	(0)
1995–1996	Flamengo	25	(0)
1997	America-RJ		
1997	América-RN		
1998	Ituano		
1998	Bragantino		
1999	Juventude		
2000–2005	Bahia	167	(0)
2006–2007	Vitória		

International career
1991	Brazil U20		
- * Club domestic league appearances and goals

Emerson de Souza Ferretti (born 3 September 1971) is a Brazilian former football goalkeeper and current President of Bahia.

== Club career ==
In 1999, Emerson won the Copa do Brasil with Juventude. After that, he was twice champion of the Northeast (2001–02) and champion of Bahia in 2001, playing for Bahia, and in 2007, for Vitória. In total, he played over 500 games as a professional footballer, including 228 games with Bahia, 155 of which were consecutive, a national record.

== International career ==
Emerson was a Brazil youth international.

== Post-playing career ==
After retiring as a professional player, Emerson became a football commentator. Emerson also worked as Sports Coordinator at the Municipal Office of the 2014 FIFA World Cup in Salvador, Bahia, as a technical advisor at SUDESB and also at the Organizing Committee of the 2019 Copa América held in Brazil, as well as president of Ypiranga.

In December 2023 he was elected president of EC Bahia.

== Personal life ==
In 2022, Emerson came out as gay.

== Honours ==
Grêmio

- Copa do Brasil: 1994

Flamengo

- Campeonato Carioca: 1996

Juventude

- Copa do Brasil: 1999

Bahia

- Copa do Nordeste: 2001, 2002
- Campeonato Baiano: 2001

Vitória

- Campeonato Baiano: 2007

Brazil U20

- South American U-20 Championship: 1991

Individual

- Bola de Prata: 2001
