= Erick Pulga =

Brazilian footballer (born 2000)

Personal information
- Full name: Erick da Costa Farias
- Date of birth: 2 October 2000 (age 26)
- Place of birth: Fortaleza, Brazil
- Height: 1.69 m (5 ft 7 in)
- Position: Forward

Team information
- Current team: Bahia
- Number: 16

Youth career
- 2018–2019: Grêmio Pague Menos
- 2019–2020: River
- 2020: → Fortaleza (loan)

Senior career*
| Years | Team | Apps | (Gls) |
| 2021–2023 | Atlético Cearense | 31 | (7) |
| 2022 | → Madureira (loan) | 11 | (1) |
| 2022 | → Campinense (loan) | 18 | (0) |
| 2022 | → Maracanã (loan) | 0 | (0) |
| 2023 | → Ferroviário (loan) | 9 | (4) |
| 2023–2025 | Ceará | 62 | (19) |
| 2025– | Bahia | 70 | (11) |
- * Club domestic league appearances and goals as of 21:11, 12 November 2026 (UTC)

Erick da Costa Farias (born 2 October 2000), known as Erick Pulga or just Pulga, is a Brazilian professional footballer who plays as a forward for Bahia.

== Club career ==
=== Early career ===
Born in Fortaleza, Ceará, Pulga joined River's youth setup in 2019 from hometown side Grêmio Pague Menos. In January 2020, after impressing in the year's Copa São Paulo de Futebol Júnior, he was promoted to the former's first team squad, but moved on loan to Fortaleza on 12 February, and joined their under-20 team.

Ahead of the 2021 season, Pulga signed for Atlético Cearense and helped in their first-ever promotion to the Série C by scoring seven league goals. On 3 December of that year, he was loaned to Madureira for the 2022 Campeonato Carioca.

On 21 May 2022, Pulga joined Campinense in the third division, also on loan; after the club's relegation, he ended the campaign at Maracanã. On 8 November, still owned by Atlético, he agreed to a deal with Ferroviário.

Pulga was a spotlight of Ferroviário during the early stages of the 2023 season, scoring in a regular basis.

=== Ceará ===
On 13 March 2023, ge revealed that Pulga agreed to a pre-contract with Ceará in the Série B. He was announced by his new club on 29 March, signing a deal until December 2025.

Mainly a backup option, Pulga started to feature more regularly in the latter stages of the 2023 campaign, under head coach Vagner Mancini. In the following year, he became an undisputed starter for the side, helping in their promotion to the Série A and finishing the 2024 Série B as top scorer with 13 goals.

=== Bahia ===
On 8 January 2025, Bahia announced the signing of Pulga on a five-year deal.

== Career statistics ==
As of 12 November 2026.

| Club | Season | League | | | State league | | Cup | | Continental | | Other | | Total | |
| Club | Season | Division | Apps | Goals | Apps | Goals | Apps | Goals | Apps | Goals | Apps | Goals | Apps | Goals |
|---|---|---|---|---|---|---|---|---|---|---|---|---|---|---|
| Atlético Cearense | 2021 | Série D | 21 | 7 | 10 | 0 | — | | — | | 2 (Note: Appearance(s) in Copa Fares Lopes) | 0 | 33 | 7 |
| Madureira (loan) | 2022 | Carioca | — | | 11 | 1 | — | | — | | — | | 11 | 1 |
| Campinense (loan) | 2022 | Série C | 13 | 0 | 5 | 0 | — | | — | | — | | 18 | 0 |
| Maracanã (loan) | 2022 | Cearense | — | | 0 | 0 | — | | — | | 8 | 1 | 8 | 1 |
| Ferroviário (loan) | 2023 | Série D | 0 | 0 | 9 | 4 | 2 | 0 | — | | 11 (Note: Appearance(s) in Copa do Nordeste) | 5 | 22 | 9 |
| Ceará | 2023 | Série B | 18 | 1 | — | | — | | — | | — | | 18 | 1 |
| Ceará | 2024 | Série B | 35 | 13 | 9 | 5 | 1 | 0 | — | | 6 | 4 | 51 | 22 |
| Ceará | Total | | 53 | 14 | 9 | 5 | 1 | 0 | 0 | 0 | 6 | 4 | 59 | 23 |
| Bahia | 2025 | Série A | 24 | 3 | 8 | 2 | 2 | 0 | 12 (Note: Ten appearances and one goal in Copa Libertadores, two appearances in Copa Sudamericana) | 1 | 4 | 3 | 50 | 9 |
| Bahia | 2026 | Série A | 33 | 5 | 5 | 1 | 2 | 0 | 2 (Note: Appearance(s) in Copa Libertadores) | 0 | — | | 42 | 6 |
| Bahia | Total | | 57 | 8 | 13 | 3 | 4 | 0 | 14 | 0 | 4 | 3 | 92 | 15 |
| Career total | | | 144 | 29 | 57 | 13 | 7 | 0 | 14 | 1 | 31 | 13 | 253 | 56 |

== Honours ==
Campinense

- Campeonato Paraibano: 2022

Ceará

- Campeonato Cearense: 2024

Bahia

- Campeonato Baiano: 2025, 2026

Individual

- 2024 Campeonato Brasileiro Série B top scorer: 13 goals
