= Campeonato Mineiro (lower levels) =

Campeonato Mineiro (lower levels) may refer to:

- Campeonato Mineiro Módulo II, Minas Gerais state football second tier
- Campeonato Mineiro Segunda Divisão, Minas Gerais state football third tier
