= Fredi Lippert =

Brazilian footballer

Personal information
- Full name: Frederico Lippert Neto Gomes
- Date of birth: 23 May 2006 (age 20)
- Place of birth: Novo Hamburgo, Brazil
- Height: 1.78 m (5 ft 10 in)
- Position: Centre-back

Team information
- Current team: Bahia
- Number: 83

Youth career
- 2022: Gramadense
- 2023: Grêmio
- 2024–: Bahia

Senior career*
Years	Team	Apps	(Gls)
2023–	Bahia	11	(1)
- * Club domestic league appearances and goals as of 2 June 2026 (UTC)

Frederico Lippert Neto Gomes (born 23 May 2006), known as Fredi Lippert or just Fredi, is a Brazilian footballer who plays for Bahia. Mainly a centre-back, he can also play as a right-back.

== Career ==
Born in Novo Hamburgo, Rio Grande do Sul, Fredi began his career with a local school in his hometown, and played for Gramadense before joining the youth categories of Grêmio in 2023. In February 2024, however, he signed for Bahia and was assigned to the under-20 team.

After playing with the under-23 squad in the 2025 Campeonato Baiano, Fredi made his Série A debut on 18 April 2025, starting in a 3–0 away loss to Cruzeiro.

== Career statistics ==
As of 2 June 2026

Club	Season	League			State League		Cup		Continental		Other		Total	
Club	Season	Division	Apps	Goals	Apps	Goals	Apps	Goals	Apps	Goals	Apps	Goals	Apps	Goals
Bahia	2025	Série A	1	0	6	0	1	0	0	0	2 (Note: Appearance(s) in Copa do Nordeste)	0	10	0
Bahia	2026	Série A	0	0	5	1	0	0	0	0	0	0	5	1
Career total			1	0	11	1	1	0	0	0	2	0	15	1

== Honours ==
Bahia

- Campeonato Baiano: 2025
- Campeonato Baiano: 2026
