= Dendê Futebol Clube =

Brazilian football club from Salvador

- Founded: 2017
- Stadium: Arena Bela Vista, Salvador, Bahia
- League: Northeast Gay Fut7 Cup

Dendê Futebol Clube (English: Dendê Football Club) is a Brazilian sports club based in Salvador, the capital of the state of Bahia. Founded in 2017, it is dedicated to playing seven-a-side football (fut 7) and encourages the participation of members of the LGBTQIA+ community, while combating the stigma and LGBTphobia within men's football. It is the first exclusively gay football club in Bahia. The club is the organizer of the Northeast Gay Fut7 Cup, a seven-a-side football competition.

Elivelton Brandão was the vice president of the football club from February 2019 to 2020. In November 2021, Wellington Santos, who was also a player of the team, took over as the vice president of the club.

== History ==
Dendê Futebol Clube was established as a result of discrimination, either overt or subtle, which has limited and made uncommon the presence of gay men in both professional and amateur football. The club was therefore founded with the objective of providing a space where sport could be practiced free from the insult and prejudice against the community, and for extending opportunities for the LGBTQIA+ people to participate in sport in northeastern Brazil. The club has drawn attention towards homophobia and transphobia existing in football, had emphasized the need for the sport to be inclusive, and increased the visibility of people who are often marginalized. Similar clubs had already been established in other Brazilian cities, and there are leagues dedicated to competition among such teams. Interactions through social media groups contributed to the creation of several Brazilian LGBT+ fut7 clubs, helped attract new members to the club, and helped increase media coverage of these organizations.

In this scenario, the idea for forming a team consisting of gay men from Salvador came from Robson Alves, originally from São Paulo, and led to the creation of a WhatsApp group in 2017. However, it was only in November 2018 that active recruitment of homosexual, transgender, and bisexual men began in order to form the team. At that time, the name "Dendê" was chosen for the club through a vote, and Arena Golaço in Lauro de Freitas, a municipality adjacent to Salvador, was selected as the club's first training venue.

In 2019, with the support of the municipality of Lauro de Freitas, Dendê FC organized the first edition of the Northeast Gay Fut7 Cup, which took place on February 9 and 10, at Arena Golaço, in the neighborhood of Buraquinho. In addition to organizing, the club also competed in the competition, alongside other clubs from the Federal District (Capital FC and Bravus FC) and the states of São Paulo (Bárbaros FC and Natus FC) and Sergipe (Araras FC). Two months before the start of the competition, Laila, a former fut7 player, took charge of the training of the team. Dendê finished the competition in fourth place after losing the semi-final to Bárbaros FC, who later lost to Bravus FC in the final for the Jean Wyllys Trophy.

The second edition of the cup competition was scheduled to be held on 28 and 29 March 2020 at the Champion Multiarena, a sports complex located within Shopping Bela Vista in Salvador. Eight to ten clubs were initially expected to be part of the competition, from the states of Amazonas, Federal District, Pará, and Sergipe, apart from Dendê, which would compete for the Marielle Franco Trophy. However, the COVID-19 pandemic prompted the postponement of the competition. In response to the pandemic in Brazil, particularly the enforced physical-distancing measures, Dendê FC used the digital platform to maintain engagement and interaction among members. It organized and took part in the "Big Brother Bicha Brasil" (2020), an online football championship coordinated through Instagram. It was played between ten teams and won by Cangayceiros Futebol Clube from Fortaleza.

In November 2021, Dendê FC unveiled a new team uniform with the goal of "removing the stain" of homophobia from the sport. The launch was also aimed at resuming the regular activities of the club, after the period of inactivity due to the pandemic, and in preparation for the Northeast Gay Fut7 Cup in May 2022, which would award a place to compete in the Brazilian LiGay Championship to be held at the end of 2022.
