= 2026 Campeonato Baiano =

Campeonato Baiano
- Season: 2026
- Dates: 10 January – 7 March
- Champions: Bahia
- Relegated: Atlético de Alagoinhas; Bahia de Feira
- Copa do Brasil: Bahia; Jacuipense; Vitória
- Série D: Jacuipense; Jequié; Juazeirense
- Copa do Nordeste: Bahia; Vitória
- Matches: 48
- Goals: 123 (2.56 per match)

The 2026 Campeonato Baiano (officially the Baianão A Mansão Green 2026 for sponsorship reasons) was the 122nd edition of Bahia's top professional football league organized by FBF. The competition began on 10 January and ended on 7 March 2026. Bahia were the defending champions.

The champions and the runners-up will qualify for the 2027 Copa do Brasil and the 2027 Copa do Nordeste. The third place will also qualify for 2027 Copa do Brasil.

== Format ==
In the first stage, each team will play the other nine teams in a single round-robin tournament. Top four teams will advance to the semi-finals. The bottom two teams will be relegated to the 2027 Campeonato Baiano Série B.

The final stages will be played on a single-leg basis, with the best overall performance team hosting the leg. If tied, the penalty shoot-out will be used to determine the winners.

Champions and runners-up will qualify for the 2027 Copa do Brasil and 2027 Copa do Nordeste, while third place will also qualify for the 2027 Copa do Brasil. The champions of the 2027 Copa Governador will earn the fourth Copa do Brasil berth. Top three teams not already qualified for 2027 Série A, Série B or Série C will qualify for 2027 Campeonato Brasileiro Série D.

== Teams ==
Club	Home city	Manager	2025 position
Atlético de Alagoinhas	Alagoinhas	Sérgio Araújo	4th
Bahia	Salvador	Rogério Ceni	1st
Bahia de Feira	Feira de Santana	João Carlos Ângelo	1st (Série B)
Barcelona de Ilhéus	Ilhéus	Paulo Salles	8th
Galícia	Salvador	Edson Fabiano	2nd (Série B)
Jacuipense	Riachão do Jacuípe	Rodrigo Ribeiro	3rd
Jequié	Jequié	Rodrigo Fonseca	7th
Juazeirense	Juazeiro	Carlos Rabello	6th
Porto	Porto Seguro	Sandro	5th
Vitória	Salvador	Jair Ventura	2nd

== First stage ==
=== Group 1 ===
Pos	Team	Pld	W	D	L	GF	GA	GD	Pts	Qualification or relegation
1	Bahia	9	7	2	0	26	9	+17	23	Advance to semi-finals
2	Vitória	9	4	4	1	13	4	+9	16	Advance to semi-finals
3	Jacuipense	9	3	4	2	11	10	+1	13	Advance to semi-finals
4	Juazeirense	9	3	4	2	7	9	−2	13	Advance to semi-finals
5	Jequié	9	3	3	3	15	13	+2	12	
6	Porto	9	2	5	2	10	12	−2	11	
7	Barcelona de Ilhéus	9	2	4	3	7	15	−8	10	
8	Galícia	9	3	0	6	7	14	−7	9	
9	Bahia de Feira	9	2	3	4	11	12	−1	9	Relegation to 2027 Campeonato Baiano Série B
10	Atlético de Alagoinhas	9	0	3	6	5	14	−9	3	Relegation to 2027 Campeonato Baiano Série B

Source: FBF
Rules for classification: 1) Points; 2) Wins; 3) Goal difference; 4) Goals scored; 5) Head-to-head result; 6) Fewest red cards; 7) Fewest yellow cards; 8) Draw.

== Final stage ==
=== Bracket ===
Semi-finals
Bahia	4
Juazeirense	2
Vitória (p)	1 (4)
Jacuipense	1 (2)

Finals
Bahia	2
Vitória	1

=== Semi-finals ===
Team 1	Score	Team 2
Bahia	4–2	Juazeirense
Vitória	1–1 (4–2 p)	Jacuipense

==== Group 2 ====
28 February 2026
17:00

Bahia	4–2	Juazeirense
Willian José 23' (pen.); Erick Pulga 33'; Olivera 61'; Sanabria 90+2'		Bino 77'; Vitinho 87'

Arena Fonte Nova, Salvador

Bahia advanced to the final.

==== Group 3 ====
1 March 2026
17:00

Vitória	1–1	Jacuipense
Renato Kayzer 2'		Pedro Henrique 65'
Penalties
Renato Kayzer (penalty scored); Osvaldo (penalty scored); Cantalapiedra (penalty scored); Marinho (penalty scored)	4–2	(penalty scored) Thiaguinho; (penalty missed) Alison Daniel; (penalty scored) Vicente Junio; (penalty missed) Flavinho

Barradão, Salvador

Vitória advanced to the final.

=== Final ===
Team 1	Score	Team 2
Bahia	2–1	Vitória

==== Group 4 ====
7 March 2026
17:00

Bahia	2–1	Vitória
Jean Lucas 53', 65'		Baralhas 19'

Arena Fonte Nova, Salvador
Referee: Wilton Sampaio (Goiás)

Bahia	Vitória

GK	1	(Brazil) Ronaldo
DF	31	(Argentina) Román Gómez	(yellow card) 43'	(substituted off) 46'
DF	3	(Brazil) Gabriel Xavier
DF	21	(Argentina) Santiago Ramos Mingo	(yellow card) 61'
DF	46	(Brazil) Luciano Juba
MF	5	(Uruguay) Nicolás Acevedo
MF	6	(Brazil) Jean Lucas	(yellow card) 66'	(substituted off) 84'
MF	10	(Brazil) Éverton Ribeiro (c)		(substituted off) 90+5'
FW	7	(Brazil) Ademir	(yellow card) 45+3'	(substituted off) 46'
FW	16	(Brazil) Erick Pulga		(substituted off) 67'
FW	12	(Brazil) Willian José
Substitutes:
GK	34	(Brazil) João Paulo
DF	25	(Brazil) Iago Borduchi
DF	43	(Brazil) Luiz Gustavo
DF	83	(Brazil) Fredi Lippert
MF	11	(Brazil) Rodrigo Nestor	(yellow card) 90+8'	(substituted on) 84'
MF	14	(Brazil) Erick		(substituted on) 46'
MF	63	(Brazil) David Martins		(substituted on) 90+5'
MF	67	(Brazil) Wendel Passos
FW	23	(Argentina) Mateo Sanabria		(substituted on) 67'
FW	27	(Brazil) Everaldo
FW	89	(Brazil) Dell
FW	99	(Uruguay) Cristian Olivera		(substituted on) 46'
Coach:
(Brazil) Rogério Ceni

GK	1	(Brazil) Lucas Arcanjo
DF	45	(Brazil) Nathan Mendes	(substituted off) 73'
DF	26	(Brazil) Edenílson	(substituted off) 72'
DF	4	(Brazil) Camutanga
DF	43	(Brazil) Edu
DF	13	(Brazil) Ramon
MF	44	(Brazil) Baralhas (c)
MF	6	(Argentina) Emmanuel Martínez	(substituted off) 80'
MF	10	(Brazil) Matheuzinho
FW	33	(Brazil) Erick	(substituted off) 59'
FW	79	(Brazil) Renato Kayzer	(substituted off) 81'
Substitutes:
GK	22	(Brazil) Gabriel Vasconcelos
DF	5	(Brazil) Riccieli
DF	77	(Brazil) Neris
DF	83	(Brazil) Jamerson
DF	98	(Brazil) Mateus Silva	(substituted on) 73'
MF	8	(Brazil) Ronald Lopes
MF	62	(Brazil) Pablo
FW	7	(Brazil) Marinho	(substituted on) 80'
FW	11	(Brazil) Osvaldo	(substituted on) 81'
FW	17	(Spain) Aitor Cantalapiedra	(substituted on) 59'
FW	20	(Brazil) Lucas Silva
FW	23	(Brazil) Fabri	(substituted on) 72'
Coach:
(Brazil) Jair Ventura

Assistant referees:
Luanderson Lima dos Santos
Daniella Coutinho Pinto
Fourth official:
Wagner Francisco Silva Souza
Fifth official:
Patrícia dos Reis do Nascimento
Video assistant referee:
Caio Max Augusto Vieira (Goiás)
Assistant video assistant referees:
Elicarlos Franco de Oliveira
Emerson Souza Silva

== Overall table ==
Pos	Team	Pld	W	D	L	GF	GA	GD	Pts	Qualification or relegation
1	Bahia	11	9	2	0	32	12	+20	29	Champions and 2027 Copa do Brasil
2	Vitória	11	4	5	2	15	7	+8	17	Runners-up and 2027 Copa do Brasil
3	Jacuipense	10	3	5	2	12	11	+1	14	2027 Copa do Brasil and 2027 Série D
4	Juazeirense	10	3	4	3	9	13	−4	13	2027 Série D
5	Jequié	9	3	3	3	15	13	+2	12	2027 Série D
6	Porto	9	2	5	2	10	12	−2	11	
7	Barcelona de Ilhéus	9	2	4	3	7	15	−8	10	
8	Galícia	9	3	0	6	7	14	−7	9	
9	Bahia de Feira	9	2	3	4	11	12	−1	9	Relegation to 2027 Campeonato Baiano Série B
10	Atlético de Alagoinhas	9	0	3	6	5	14	−9	3	Relegation to 2027 Campeonato Baiano Série B

Source: FBF
