= 2023 FIFA U-20 World Cup =

International youth football championship tournament

Copa Mundial Sub-20 de la FIFA Argentina 2023

Tournament details
- Host country: Argentina
- Dates: 20 May – 11 June
- Teams: 24 (from 6 confederations)
- Venues: 4 (in 4 host cities)

Final positions
- Champions: Uruguay (1st title)
- Runners-up: Italy
- Third place: Israel
- Fourth place: South Korea

Tournament statistics
- Matches played: 52
- Goals scored: 154 (2.96 per match)
- Attendance: 692,084 (13,309 per match)
- Top scorer(s): (Italy) Cesare Casadei (7 goals)
- Best player: (Italy) Cesare Casadei
- Best goalkeeper: (Italy) Sebastiano Desplanches
- Fair play award: United States

The 2023 FIFA U-20 World Cup was the 23rd edition of the FIFA U-20 World Cup, the biennial international men's youth football championship contested by the under-20 national teams of the member associations of FIFA, since its inception in 1977 as the FIFA World Youth Championship. The official match ball used in the tournament was Adidas Oceaunz.

The tournament was held in Argentina, who had previously hosted in 2001. Indonesia had originally been set to host the competition, having been hosts of the cancelled 2021 edition, but their hosting rights were stripped on 29 March 2023 due to their refusal to host Israel.

Reigning champions Ukraine could not defend their title as they failed to qualify. In doing so, they became the seventh consecutive incumbent title holders to fail to qualify for the subsequent tournament. Hosts Argentina were knocked out in the round of 16 after three wins in the group stage following a two-nil loss to Nigeria. Uruguay defeated Italy in the final, becoming champions for the first time. It was the country's first world title since their men's senior side won the 1950 FIFA World Cup.

== Host selection ==
Five bids to host the original 2021 tournament were submitted in 2019, and Indonesia was announced as the winning bidder on 24 October 2019. In December 2020, the 2021 event was postponed until 2023, with Indonesia remaining as host.

However, Indonesia was stripped of hosting rights on 29 March 2023 due to its refusal to allow the Israel U-20 national team in the country. Peru, Argentina and Qatar confirmed their interest in hosting the tournament. On 30 March, Argentina became the only country to submit an official bid.

On 17 April 2023, at a press conference jointly held by economy minister Sergio Massa, tourism and sports minister Matías Lammens, and the president of the Argentine Football Association (AFA), Claudio Tapia, it was announced that Argentina would host the tournament, followed shortly after by a statement from FIFA confirming Argentina as the new hosts.

== Qualified teams ==
A total of 24 teams qualified for the final tournament. Teams qualified from six continental competitions.

The Dominican Republic and Israel made their debut in the competition; this was the Dominican Republic's first-ever qualification for a FIFA tournament. Having qualified for the 1970 FIFA World Cup via the Asian qualification, this was the first FIFA tournament for which Israel qualified as a European representative.

Argentina qualified for the tournament as the host country in place of Indonesia, even though they originally had failed to qualify through the 2023 South American U-20 Championship. Indonesia had also failed to qualify for the competition and lost its automatic spot in the WC when the tournament was moved to Argentina.

Confederation	Qualifying tournament	Team	Appearance	Last appearance	Previous best performance
AFC (Asia)	2023 AFC U-20 Asian Cup	Iraq	5th	2013	Fourth place (2013)
AFC (Asia)	2023 AFC U-20 Asian Cup	Japan	11th	2019	Runners-up (1999)
AFC (Asia)	2023 AFC U-20 Asian Cup	South Korea	16th	2019	Runners-up (2019)
AFC (Asia)	2023 AFC U-20 Asian Cup	Uzbekistan	5th	2015	Quarter-finals (2013, 2015)
CAF (Africa)	2023 U-20 Africa Cup of Nations	Gambia	2nd	2007	Round of 16 (2007)
CAF (Africa)	2023 U-20 Africa Cup of Nations	Nigeria	13th	2019	Runners-up (1989, 2005)
CAF (Africa)	2023 U-20 Africa Cup of Nations	Senegal	4th	2019	Fourth place (2015)
CAF (Africa)	2023 U-20 Africa Cup of Nations	Tunisia	3rd	1985	Group stage (1977, 1985)
CONCACAF (Central, North America and Caribbean)	2022 CONCACAF U-20 Championship	Dominican Republic	1st	Debut	Debut
CONCACAF (Central, North America and Caribbean)	2022 CONCACAF U-20 Championship	Guatemala	2nd	2011	Round of 16 (2011)
CONCACAF (Central, North America and Caribbean)	2022 CONCACAF U-20 Championship	Honduras	9th	2019	Group stage (1977, 1995, 1999, 2005, 2009, 2015, 2017, 2019)
CONCACAF (Central, North America and Caribbean)	2022 CONCACAF U-20 Championship	United States	17th	2019	Fourth place (1989)
CONMEBOL (South America)	Host nation	Argentina	17th	2019	Champions (1979, 1995, 1997, 2001, 2005, 2007)
CONMEBOL (South America)	2023 South American U-20 Championship	Brazil	19th	2015	Champions (1983, 1985, 1993, 2003, 2011)
CONMEBOL (South America)	2023 South American U-20 Championship	Colombia	11th	2019	Third place (2003)
CONMEBOL (South America)	2023 South American U-20 Championship	Ecuador	5th	2019	Third place (2019)
CONMEBOL (South America)	2023 South American U-20 Championship	Uruguay	16th	2019	Runners-up (1997, 2013)
OFC (Oceania)	2022 OFC U-19 Championship	Fiji	2nd	2015	Group stage (2015)
OFC (Oceania)	2022 OFC U-19 Championship	New Zealand	7th	2019	Round of 16 (2015, 2017, 2019)
UEFA (Europe)	2022 UEFA European Under-19 Championship	England	12th	2017	Champions (2017)
UEFA (Europe)	2022 UEFA European Under-19 Championship	France	8th	2019	Champions (2013)
UEFA (Europe)	2022 UEFA European Under-19 Championship	Israel	1st	Debut	Debut
UEFA (Europe)	2022 UEFA European Under-19 Championship	Italy	8th	2019	Third place (2017)
UEFA (Europe)	2022 UEFA European Under-19 Championship	Slovakia	2nd	2003	Round of 16 (2003)

== Venues ==
La Plata, Mendoza, San Juan and Santiago del Estero were the four cities chosen to host the competition.

La Plata	Santiago del Estero	Mendoza	San Juan
Estadio Único Diego Armando Maradona (Estadio de La Plata)	Estadio Único Madre de Ciudades (Estadio de Santiago del Estero)	Estadio Malvinas Argentinas (Estadio de Mendoza)	Estadio San Juan del Bicentenario (Estadio de San Juan)
Capacity: 53,000	Capacity: 30,000	Capacity: 42,000	Capacity: 25,286
2023 FIFA U-20 World Cup is located in Argentina

== Draw ==
The draw took place at 16:00 CEST (11:00 ART host time) on 21 April 2023 at FIFA headquarters in Zürich, Switzerland. The twenty-four teams were drawn into six groups of four teams, with the hosts, Argentina, automatically seeded to Pot 1 and placed into the first position of Group A, while the remaining teams were seeded into their respective pots based on their results in the last five FIFA U-20 World Cups (more recent tournaments weighted more heavily), and with five bonus points added to each of the 6 continental champions from the qualifying tournaments, as follows:

Pot	Team	Confederation	2011	2013	2015	2017	2019		
Pot	Team	Confederation	Points (20%)	Points (40%)	Points (60%)	Points (80%)	Points (100%)	Bonus (Note: Continental champions bonus points)	Total points
1	Argentina (H)	CONMEBOL	Host nation, automatically assigned to Pot 1						
1	Uruguay	CONMEBOL	0.4	5.6	3	10.4	9		28.4
1	United States	CONCACAF	DNQ	0.4	6	6.4	9	+5	26.8
1	France	UEFA	2.4	5.6	DNQ	7.2	9		24.2
1	Senegal	CAF	DNQ	DNQ	4.8	3.2	11	+5	24
1	Italy	UEFA	DNQ	DNQ	DNQ	8.8	13		21.8
2	England	UEFA	0.6	0.8	DNQ	15.2	DNQ	+5	21.6
2	South Korea	AFC	0.8	2.4	DNQ	4.8	13		21
2	New Zealand	OFC	0.4	0	2.4	3.2	7	+5	18
2	Brazil	CONMEBOL	3.4	DNQ	8.4	DNQ	DNQ	+5	16.8
2	Ecuador	CONMEBOL	0.8	DNQ	DNQ	1.6	13		15.4
2	Colombia	CONMEBOL	2.4	3.2	2.4	DNQ	7		15
3	Nigeria	CAF	2.4	2.4	3.6	DNQ	4		12.4
3	Uzbekistan	AFC	DNQ	2.8	3.6	DNQ	DNQ	+5	11.4
3	Japan	AFC	DNQ	DNQ	DNQ	3.2	5		8.2
3	Iraq	AFC	DNQ	4.8	DNQ	DNQ	DNQ		4.8
3	Honduras	CONCACAF	DNQ	DNQ	1.8	2.4	0		4.2
3	Fiji	OFC	DNQ	DNQ	1.8	DNQ	DNQ		1.8
4	Guatemala	CONCACAF	0.6	DNQ	DNQ	DNQ	DNQ		0.6
4	Dominican Republic	CONCACAF	DNQ	DNQ	DNQ	DNQ	DNQ		0
4	Gambia	CAF	DNQ	DNQ	DNQ	DNQ	DNQ		0
4	Israel	UEFA	DNQ	DNQ	DNQ	DNQ	DNQ		0
4	Slovakia	UEFA	DNQ	DNQ	DNQ	DNQ	DNQ		0
4	Tunisia	CAF	DNQ	DNQ	DNQ	DNQ	DNQ		0

The draw started with teams from pot one being drawn first and placed in the first position of their groups (hosts Argentina automatically assigned to A1). Then were drawn the teams from pot 2, followed by pot 3 and pot 4, with each team also drawn to one of the positions within their group, No group could contain more than one team from each confederation. The ceremony was presented by Samantha Johnson and conducted by FIFA Director of Tournaments Jaime Yarza, with the former footballers Juan Pablo Sorín, from Argentina, and David Trezeguet, from France, acting as draw assistants.

The draw resulted in the following groups:

Group A
Pos	Team
A1	Argentina
A2	Uzbekistan
A3	Guatemala
A4	New Zealand

Group D
Pos	Team
D1	Italy
D2	Brazil
D3	Nigeria
D4	Dominican Republic

Group B
Pos	Team
B1	United States
B2	Ecuador
B3	Fiji
B4	Slovakia

Group E
Pos	Team
E1	Uruguay
E2	Iraq
E3	England
E4	Tunisia

Group C
Pos	Team
C1	Senegal
C2	Japan
C3	Israel
C4	Colombia

Group F
Pos	Team
F1	France
F2	South Korea
F3	Gambia
F4	Honduras

== Match officials ==
A total of nineteen refereeing trios (a referee and two assistant referees), six support referees, and eighteen video assistant referees were appointed for the tournament.

Confederation	Referees	Assistant referees	Video assistant referees	Support referee
AFC	(Japan) Yusuke Araki	(Japan) Jun Mihara (Japan) Takumi Takagi	(United Arab Emirates) Ahmad Muhammad Darwish (South Korea) Kim Jong-hyeok (Thailand) Sivakorn Pu-udom	(Kuwait) Ahmad Al-Ali
AFC	(Saudi Arabia) Mohammed Al-Hoaish	(Saudi Arabia) Khalaf Zayid Ash-Shammari (Saudi Arabia) Yasir Abdullah As-Sultan	(United Arab Emirates) Ahmad Muhammad Darwish (South Korea) Kim Jong-hyeok (Thailand) Sivakorn Pu-udom	(Kuwait) Ahmad Al-Ali
AFC	(Qatar) Salman Falahi	(Qatar) Ramzan Sa'id An-Nu'aimi (Qatar) Majid Hudairis Ash-Shammari	(United Arab Emirates) Ahmad Muhammad Darwish (South Korea) Kim Jong-hyeok (Thailand) Sivakorn Pu-udom	(Kuwait) Ahmad Al-Ali
CAF	(Egypt) Muhammad Maarouf	(Morocco) Zakaria Burinsi (Algeria) Abbas Akram Zarhouni	(Morocco) Hamza Al-Fariq (Egypt) Umar Ahmad Abdulrahim Ash-Shinawi	(Mauritania) Abdulaziz Muhammad Bouh
CAF	(South Africa) Abongile Tom	(Angola) Ivanildo Meirelles de Oliveira Sanches Lopes (São Tomé and Príncipe) Abelmiro dos Reis Monte Negro	(Morocco) Hamza Al-Fariq (Egypt) Umar Ahmad Abdulrahim Ash-Shinawi	(Mauritania) Abdulaziz Muhammad Bouh
CAF	(Senegal) Issa Sy	(Senegal) Nouha Bangoura (Ivory Coast) Adou Hermann Désiré Ngoh	(Morocco) Hamza Al-Fariq (Egypt) Umar Ahmad Abdulrahim Ash-Shinawi	(Mauritania) Abdulaziz Muhammad Bouh
CONCACAF	(Mexico) Marco Ortíz	(Mexico) Enrique Isaac Bustos Díaz (Mexico) Jorge Antonio Sánchez Espinoza	(Mexico) Adonai Escobedo (Nicaragua) Tatiana Guzmán (United States) Tim Ford	(Guatemala) Bryan López
CONCACAF	(Costa Rica) Juan Gabriel Calderón	(Costa Rica) William Arrieta (Nicaragua) Henry Pupiro	(Mexico) Adonai Escobedo (Nicaragua) Tatiana Guzmán (United States) Tim Ford	(Guatemala) Bryan López
CONCACAF	(Jamaica) Oshane Nation	(Jamaica) Ojay Duhaney (Jamaica) Jassett Kerr-Wilson	(Mexico) Adonai Escobedo (Nicaragua) Tatiana Guzmán (United States) Tim Ford	(Guatemala) Bryan López
CONMEBOL	(Brazil) Ramon Abatti	(Brazil) Rafael da Silva Alves (Brazil) Guilherme Dias Camilo	(Argentina) Germán Delfino (Brazil) Rodolpho Toski (Chile) Juan Lara (Ecuador) Carlos Orbe	(Venezuela) Yender Herrera
CONMEBOL	(Chile) Piero Maza	(Chile) Claudio Urrutia (Chile) Alejandro Molina	(Argentina) Germán Delfino (Brazil) Rodolpho Toski (Chile) Juan Lara (Ecuador) Carlos Orbe	(Venezuela) Yender Herrera
CONMEBOL	(Colombia) Jhon Ospina	(Colombia) John León (Colombia) John Gallego	(Argentina) Germán Delfino (Brazil) Rodolpho Toski (Chile) Juan Lara (Ecuador) Carlos Orbe	(Venezuela) Yender Herrera
CONMEBOL	(Argentina) Yael Falcón	(Argentina) Maximiliano Del Yesso (Argentina) Facundo Rodríguez	(Argentina) Germán Delfino (Brazil) Rodolpho Toski (Chile) Juan Lara (Ecuador) Carlos Orbe	(Venezuela) Yender Herrera
OFC	(New Zealand) Campbell-Kirk Kawana-Waugh	(Tonga) Folio Moeaki (Solomon Islands) Bernard Mutukera		(Fiji) Veer Singh
UEFA	(France) François Letexier	(France) Cyril Mugnier (France) Mehdi Rahmouni	(Portugal) Luis Godinho (Netherlands) Dennis Higler (Italy) Aleandro Di Paolo (France) Willy Delajod (Spain) Guillermo Cuadra Fernández (Switzerland) Fedayi San	(Lithuania) Donatas Rumšas
UEFA	(Netherlands) Serdar Gözübüyük	(Netherlands) Erwin Zeinstra (Netherlands) Johan Balder	(Portugal) Luis Godinho (Netherlands) Dennis Higler (Italy) Aleandro Di Paolo (France) Willy Delajod (Spain) Guillermo Cuadra Fernández (Switzerland) Fedayi San	(Lithuania) Donatas Rumšas
UEFA	(Spain) José María Sánchez Martínez	(Spain) Raúl Cabanero Martínez (Spain) Iñigo Prieto López de Ceraín	(Portugal) Luis Godinho (Netherlands) Dennis Higler (Italy) Aleandro Di Paolo (France) Willy Delajod (Spain) Guillermo Cuadra Fernández (Switzerland) Fedayi San	(Lithuania) Donatas Rumšas
UEFA	(Sweden) Glenn Nyberg	(Sweden) Mahbod Beigi (Sweden) Andreas Söderkvist	(Portugal) Luis Godinho (Netherlands) Dennis Higler (Italy) Aleandro Di Paolo (France) Willy Delajod (Spain) Guillermo Cuadra Fernández (Switzerland) Fedayi San	(Lithuania) Donatas Rumšas
UEFA	(Turkey) Halil Umut Meler	(Turkey) Mustafa Emre Eyisoy (Turkey) Kerem Ersoy	(Portugal) Luis Godinho (Netherlands) Dennis Higler (Italy) Aleandro Di Paolo (France) Willy Delajod (Spain) Guillermo Cuadra Fernández (Switzerland) Fedayi San	(Lithuania) Donatas Rumšas

== Squads ==
Players born between 1 January 2003 and 31 December 2007 (inclusive) were eligible to compete in the tournament.

Each team had to name a preliminary squad of between 22 and 50 players. From the preliminary squad, the team had to name a final squad of 21 players (three of whom must be goalkeepers) by the FIFA deadline. Players in the final squad could be replaced by a player from the preliminary squad due to serious injury or illness up to 24 hours prior to kickoff of the team's first match.

== Group stage ==
The top two teams of each group and the four best third-placed teams advanced to the round of 16.

All times are in local, Argentina time (UTC–3).

=== Tiebreakers ===
The rankings of teams in each group were determined as follows (regulations Article 17.7):

1. points obtained in all group matches;
2. goal difference in all group matches;
3. number of goals scored in all group matches;

If two or more teams were equal on the basis of the above three criteria, their rankings were determined by:

4. points obtained in the group matches between the teams concerned;
5. goal difference in the group matches between the teams concerned;
6. number of goals scored in the group matches between the teams concerned;
7. fair play points:
  - first yellow card: minus one point;
  - indirect red card (second yellow card): minus three points;
  - direct red card: minus four points;
  - yellow card and direct red card: minus five points;
8. drawing of lots by the FIFA Organising Committee.

=== Group A ===
Pos	Team	Pld	W	D	L	GF	GA	GD	Pts	Qualification
1	Argentina (H)	3	3	0	0	10	1	+9	9	Knockout stage
2	Uzbekistan	3	1	1	1	5	4	+1	4	Knockout stage
3	New Zealand	3	1	1	1	3	7	−4	4	Knockout stage
4	Guatemala	3	0	0	3	0	6	−6	0	

Source: FIFA
Rules for classification: Group stage tiebreakers
(H) Hosts
20 May 2023
15:00

Guatemala	0–1	New Zealand
	Report	Garbett 80'

Estadio Único Madre de Ciudades, Santiago del Estero
Attendance: 15,100
Referee: Abongile Tom (South Africa)
20 May 2023
18:00

Argentina	2–1	Uzbekistan
Véliz 27'; Carboni 41'	Report	Makhamadjonov 23'

Estadio Único Madre de Ciudades, Santiago del Estero
Attendance: 37,233
Referee: François Letexier (France)

23 May 2023
15:00

Uzbekistan	2–2	New Zealand
Fayzullaev 51'; Esanov 90+3'	Report	Wallace 23'; Herdman 41'

Estadio Único Madre de Ciudades, Santiago del Estero
Attendance: 12,243
Referee: Oshane Nation (Jamaica)
23 May 2023
18:00

Argentina	3–0	Guatemala
Véliz 17'; Romero 65'; Perrone 90+8'	Report

Estadio Único Madre de Ciudades, Santiago del Estero
Attendance: 37,033
Referee: Halil Umut Meler (Turkey)

26 May 2023
18:00

Uzbekistan	2–0	Guatemala
Nematjonov 9', 20'	Report

Estadio Único Madre de Ciudades, Santiago del Estero
Attendance: 15,357
Referee: Mohamed Marouf (Egypt)
26 May 2023
18:00

New Zealand	0–5	Argentina
	Report	Maestro Puch 14'; Infantino 17'; Romero 35'; Aguirre 50' (pen.); Véliz 87'

Estadio San Juan del Bicentenario, San Juan
Attendance: 27,836
Referee: Salman Falahi (Qatar)

=== Group B ===
Pos	Team	Pld	W	D	L	GF	GA	GD	Pts	Qualification
1	United States	3	3	0	0	6	0	+6	9	Knockout stage
2	Ecuador	3	2	0	1	11	2	+9	6	Knockout stage
3	Slovakia	3	1	0	2	5	4	+1	3	Knockout stage
4	Fiji	3	0	0	3	0	16	−16	0	

Source: FIFA
Rules for classification: Group stage tiebreakers
20 May 2023
15:00

United States	1–0	Ecuador
Gómez 90+3'	Report

Estadio San Juan del Bicentenario, San Juan
Attendance: 14,865
Referee: Salman Falahi (Qatar)
20 May 2023
18:00

Fiji	0–4	Slovakia
	Report	Gaži 17'; Szolgai 25'; Gajdoš 70'; Jambor 79'

Estadio San Juan del Bicentenario, San Juan
Attendance: 9,359
Referee: Issa Sy (Senegal)

23 May 2023
15:00

United States	3–0	Fiji
Luna 66'; Cowell 88'; Wiley 90+9'	Report

Estadio San Juan del Bicentenario, San Juan
Attendance: 8,017
Referee: Mohamed Marouf (Egypt)
23 May 2023
18:00

Ecuador	2–1	Slovakia
Cuero 45+1'; Klinger 59'	Report	Szolgai 29'

Estadio San Juan del Bicentenario, San Juan
Attendance: 13,919
Referee: Mohammed Al-Hoaish (Saudi Arabia)

26 May 2023
15:00

Ecuador	9–0	Fiji
Páez 7'; Klinger 34'; Cuero 36', 45+6'; Minda 66', 85'; Chamba 89'; C. Zambrano 90+6' (pen.), 90+10'	Report

Estadio Único Madre de Ciudades, Santiago del Estero
Attendance: 9,958
Referee: Yusuke Araki (Japan)
26 May 2023
15:00

Slovakia	0–2	United States
	Report	Cowell 38'; Tsakiris 90+6'

Estadio San Juan del Bicentenario, San Juan
Attendance: 15,059
Referee: Ramon Abatti (Brazil)

=== Group C ===
Pos	Team	Pld	W	D	L	GF	GA	GD	Pts	Qualification
1	Colombia	3	2	1	0	5	3	+2	7	Knockout stage
2	Israel	3	1	1	1	4	4	0	4	Knockout stage
3	Japan	3	1	0	2	3	4	−1	3	
4	Senegal	3	0	2	1	2	3	−1	2	

Source: FIFA
Rules for classification: Group stage tiebreakers
21 May 2023
15:00

Israel	1–2	Colombia
Turgeman 57' (pen.)	Report	Cortés 74' (pen.); Puerta 90'

Estadio Único Diego Armando Maradona, La Plata
Attendance: 7,613
Referee: Juan Gabriel Calderón (Costa Rica)
21 May 2023
18:00

Senegal	0–1	Japan
	Report	Matsuki 15'

Estadio Único Diego Armando Maradona, La Plata
Attendance: 8,625
Referee: Serdar Gözübüyük (Netherlands)

24 May 2023
15:00

Senegal	1–1	Israel
P. Diop 80'	Report	B. N'Diaye 58' (o.g.)

Estadio Único Diego Armando Maradona, La Plata
Attendance: 2,078
Referee: Yael Falcón (Argentina)
24 May 2023
18:00

Japan	1–2	Colombia
Yamane 30'	Report	Asprilla 53'; Ángel 59'

Estadio Único Diego Armando Maradona, La Plata
Attendance: 3,768
Referee: José María Sánchez Martínez (Spain)

27 May 2023
18:00

Colombia	1–1	Senegal
Cortés 90+5'	Report	Camara 30'

Estadio Único Diego Armando Maradona, La Plata
Attendance: 15,825
Referee: Halil Umut Meler (Turkey)
27 May 2023
18:00

Japan	1–2	Israel
Sakamoto 45+1'	Report	Navi 76'; Senior 90+2'

Estadio Malvinas Argentinas, Mendoza
Attendance: 7,581
Referee: Piero Maza (Chile)

=== Group D ===
Pos	Team	Pld	W	D	L	GF	GA	GD	Pts	Qualification
1	Brazil	3	2	0	1	10	3	+7	6	Knockout stage
2	Italy	3	2	0	1	6	4	+2	6	Knockout stage
3	Nigeria	3	2	0	1	4	3	+1	6	Knockout stage
4	Dominican Republic	3	0	0	3	1	11	−10	0	

Source: FIFA
Rules for classification: Group stage tiebreakers
21 May 2023
15:00

Nigeria	2–1	Dominican Republic
De Peña 31' (o.g.); Sam. Lawal 71'	Report	Azcona 23' (pen.)

Estadio Malvinas Argentinas, Mendoza
Attendance: 21,647
Referee: Yusuke Araki (Japan)
21 May 2023
18:00

Italy	3–2	Brazil
Prati 11'; Casadei 28', 35' (pen.)	Report	Marcos Leonardo 72', 87'

Estadio Malvinas Argentinas, Mendoza
Attendance: 35,531
Referee: Marco Ortíz (Mexico)

24 May 2023
15:00

Italy	0–2	Nigeria
	Report	Sal. Lawal 61'; Sunday 90+5'

Estadio Malvinas Argentinas, Mendoza
Attendance: 5,701
Referee: Piero Maza (Chile)
24 May 2023
18:00

Brazil	6–0	Dominican Republic
Sávio 37'; Marcos Leonardo 38'; Jean Pedroso 57'; Giovane 82'; Marlon Gomes 90+2'; Matheus Martins 90+3'	Report

Estadio Malvinas Argentinas, Mendoza
Attendance: 7,253
Referee: François Letexier (France)

27 May 2023
15:00

Brazil	2–0	Nigeria
Jean Pedroso 43'; Marquinhos 45+2'	Report

Estadio Único Diego Armando Maradona, La Plata
Attendance: 29,134
Referee: Serdar Gözübüyük (Netherlands)
27 May 2023
15:00

Dominican Republic	0–3	Italy
	Report	Casadei 19', 84'; Ambrosino 50'

Estadio Malvinas Argentinas, Mendoza
Attendance: 6,709
Referee: Mohammed Al-Hoaish (Saudi Arabia)

=== Group E ===
Pos	Team	Pld	W	D	L	GF	GA	GD	Pts	Qualification
1	England	3	2	1	0	4	2	+2	7	Knockout stage
2	Uruguay	3	2	0	1	7	3	+4	6	Knockout stage
3	Tunisia	3	1	0	2	3	2	+1	3	Knockout stage
4	Iraq	3	0	1	2	0	7	−7	1	

Source: FIFA
Rules for classification: Group stage tiebreakers
22 May 2023
15:00

England	1–0	Tunisia
Scarlett 25'	Report

Estadio Único Diego Armando Maradona, La Plata
Attendance: 2,765
Referee: Ramon Abatti (Brazil)
22 May 2023
18:00

Uruguay	4–0	Iraq
Abaldo 38'; Ferrari 48'; Hassan 62' (o.g.); Matturro 90+2'	Report

Estadio Único Diego Armando Maradona, La Plata
Attendance: 5,176
Referee: Glenn Nyberg (Sweden)

25 May 2023
15:00

Uruguay	2–3	England
Fr. González 49'; Abaldo 90+9'	Report	Humphreys 22'; Devine 45+4'; Gyabi 90+5'

Estadio Único Diego Armando Maradona, La Plata
Attendance: 27,231
Referee: Marco Ortíz (Mexico)
25 May 2023
18:00

Iraq	0–3	Tunisia
	Report	Snana 55'; El Djebali 57'; Ghorbel 86' (pen.)

Estadio Único Diego Armando Maradona, La Plata
Attendance: 8,021
Referee: Jhon Ospina (Colombia)

28 May 2023
15:00

Iraq	0–0	England
	Report

Estadio Único Diego Armando Maradona, La Plata
Attendance: 12,122
Referee: Campbell-Kirk Kawana-Waugh (New Zealand)
28 May 2023
15:00

Tunisia	0–1	Uruguay
	Report	Fr. González 90+3' (pen.)

Estadio Malvinas Argentinas, Mendoza
Attendance: 6,497
Referee: José María Sánchez Martínez (Spain)

=== Group F ===
Pos	Team	Pld	W	D	L	GF	GA	GD	Pts	Qualification
1	Gambia	3	2	1	0	4	2	+2	7	Knockout stage
2	South Korea	3	1	2	0	4	3	+1	5	Knockout stage
3	France	3	1	0	2	5	5	0	3	
4	Honduras	3	0	1	2	4	7	−3	1	

Source: FIFA
Rules for classification: Group stage tiebreakers
22 May 2023
15:00

France	1–2	South Korea
Virginius 70' (pen.)	Report	Lee Seung-won 22'; Lee Young-jun 64'

Estadio Malvinas Argentinas, Mendoza
Attendance: 2,671
Referee: Jhon Ospina (Colombia)
22 May 2023
18:00

Gambia	2–1	Honduras
Bojang 1', 84'	Report	Aceituno 5'

Estadio Malvinas Argentinas, Mendoza
Attendance: 3,147
Referee: Campbell-Kirk Kawana-Waugh (New Zealand)

25 May 2023
15:00

France	1–2	Gambia
Odobert 61'	Report	Zoukrou 13' (o.g.); Sanyang 68'

Estadio Malvinas Argentinas, Mendoza
Attendance: 5,314
Referee: Juan Gabriel Calderón (Costa Rica)
25 May 2023
18:00

South Korea	2–2	Honduras
Kim Yong-hak 58'; Park Seung-ho 62'	Report	Ruiz 22' (pen.); Castillo 51'

Estadio Malvinas Argentinas, Mendoza
Attendance: 6,851
Referee: Abongile Tom (South Africa)

28 May 2023
18:00

Honduras	1–3	France
Ramos 15'	Report	Virginius 41', 60'; Nzouango 77'

Estadio Único Diego Armando Maradona, La Plata
Attendance: 8,904
Referee: Issa Sy (Senegal)
28 May 2023
18:00

South Korea	0–0	Gambia
	Report

Estadio Malvinas Argentinas, Mendoza
Attendance: 7,463
Referee: Oshane Nation (Jamaica)

=== Ranking of third-placed teams ===
The four best third-placed teams from the six groups advanced to the knockout stage along with the six group winners and six runners-up.

Pos	Grp	Team	Pld	W	D	L	GF	GA	GD	Pts	Qualification
1	D	Nigeria	3	2	0	1	4	3	+1	6	Knockout stage
2	A	New Zealand	3	1	1	1	3	7	−4	4	Knockout stage
3	B	Slovakia	3	1	0	2	5	4	+1	3	Knockout stage
4	E	Tunisia	3	1	0	2	3	2	+1	3	Knockout stage
5	F	France	3	1	0	2	5	5	0	3	
6	C	Japan	3	1	0	2	3	4	−1	3	

Source: FIFA
Rules for classification: 1) Points; 2) Goal difference; 3) Goals scored; 4) Fair play points; 5) Drawing of lots.

In the next stage, the four third-placed teams were matched with the winners of groups A, B, C, and D according to the tournament regulations.

== Knockout stage ==
In the knockout stage, if a match was level at the end of 90 minutes of normal playing time, extra time was played (two periods of 15 minutes each). If still tied after extra time, the match would be decided by a penalty shoot-out.

In the round of 16, the four third-placed teams were matched with the winners of groups A, B, C, and D. The specific match-ups involving the third-placed teams depended on which four third-placed teams qualified for the round of 16:

Third-placed teams qualified from groups						1A vs	1B vs	1C vs	1D vs
A	B	C	D			3C	3D	3A	3B
A	B	C		E		3C	3A	3B	3E
A	B	C			F	3C	3A	3B	3F
A	B		D	E		3D	3A	3B	3E
A	B		D		F	3D	3A	3B	3F
A	B			E	F	3E	3A	3B	3F
A		C	D	E		3C	3D	3A	3E
A		C	D		F	3C	3D	3A	3F
A		C		E	F	3C	3A	3F	3E
A			D	E	F	3D	3A	3F	3E
	B	C	D	E		3C	3D	3B	3E
	B	C	D		F	3C	3D	3B	3F
	B	C		E	F	3E	3C	3B	3F
	B		D	E	F	3E	3D	3B	3F
		C	D	E	F	3C	3D	3F	3E

=== Bracket ===
Round of 16
30 May – Mendoza
United States	4
New Zealand	0
1 June – Santiago del Estero
Gambia	0
Uruguay	1
30 May – Mendoza
Uzbekistan	0
Israel	1
31 May – La Plata
Brazil	4
Tunisia	1
31 May – San Juan
Colombia	5
Slovakia	1
31 May – La Plata
England	1
Italy	2
1 June – Santiago del Estero
Ecuador	2
South Korea	3
31 May – San Juan
Argentina	0
Nigeria	2

Quarter-finals
4 June – Santiago del Estero
United States	0
Uruguay	2
3 June – San Juan
Israel (a.e.t.)	3
Brazil	2
3 June – San Juan
Colombia	1
Italy	3
4 June – Santiago del Estero
South Korea (a.e.t.)	1
Nigeria	0

Semi-finals
8 June – La Plata
Uruguay	1
Israel	0
8 June – La Plata
Italy	2
South Korea	1

Final
11 June – La Plata
Uruguay	1
Italy	0
Third place play-off
11 June – La Plata
Israel	3
South Korea	1

=== Round of 16 ===
30 May 2023
14:30

United States	4–0	New Zealand
Wolff 14'; Cowell 61'; Che 75'; Pukštas 82'	Report

Estadio Malvinas Argentinas, Mendoza
Attendance: 7,848
Referee: Mohamed Marouf (Egypt)

30 May 2023
18:00

Uzbekistan	0–1	Israel
	Report	Khalaily 90+7'

Estadio Malvinas Argentinas, Mendoza
Attendance: 10,492
Referee: Yael Falcón (Argentina)

31 May 2023
14:30

Brazil	4–1	Tunisia
Marcos Leonardo 11' (pen.); Andrey Santos 31', 90+10'; Matheus Martins 90+1'	Report	Ghorbel 90+13'

Estadio Único Diego Armando Maradona, La Plata
Attendance: 9,175
Referee: Halil Umut Meler (Turkey)

31 May 2023
14:30

Colombia	5–1	Slovakia
Cortés 48', 90+4'; Asprilla 50'; Ángel 52', 63'	Report	Jambor 87'

Estadio San Juan del Bicentenario, San Juan
Attendance: 4,630
Referee: Mohammed Al-Hoaish (Saudi Arabia)

31 May 2023
18:00

England	1–2	Italy
Devine 24'	Report	Baldanzi 8'; Casadei 87' (pen.)

Estadio Único Diego Armando Maradona, La Plata
Attendance: 12,832
Referee: Ramon Abatti (Brazil)

31 May 2023
18:00

Argentina	0–2	Nigeria
	Report	Muhammad 61'; Sarki 90+1'

Estadio San Juan del Bicentenario, San Juan
Attendance: 27,179
Referee: Glenn Nyberg (Sweden)

1 June 2023
14:30

Gambia	0–1	Uruguay
	Report	Duarte 65'

Estadio Único Madre de Ciudades, Santiago del Estero
Attendance: 7,644
Referee: François Letexier (France)

1 June 2023
18:00

Ecuador	2–3	South Korea
Cuero 36' (pen.); González 84'	Report	Lee Young-jun 11'; Bae Jun-ho 19'; Choi Seok-hyun 48'

Estadio Único Madre de Ciudades, Santiago del Estero
Attendance: 12,492
Referee: Oshane Nation (Jamaica)

=== Quarter-finals ===
3 June 2023
14:30

Israel	3–2 (a.e.t.)	Brazil
Khalaily 60'; Shibli 93'; Turgeman 105+3'	Report	Marcos Leonardo 56'; Matheus Nascimento 91'

Estadio San Juan del Bicentenario, San Juan
Attendance: 1,765
Referee: Juan Gabriel Calderón (Costa Rica)

3 June 2023
18:00

Colombia	1–3	Italy
Torres 49'	Report	Casadei 9'; Baldanzi 38'; Esposito 46'

Estadio San Juan del Bicentenario, San Juan
Attendance: 3,167
Referee: Salman Falahi (Qatar)

4 June 2023
14:30

South Korea	1–0 (a.e.t.)	Nigeria
Choi Seok-hyun 95'	Report

Estadio Único Madre de Ciudades, Santiago del Estero
Attendance: 10,298
Referee: José María Sánchez Martínez (Spain)

4 June 2023
18:00

United States	0–2	Uruguay
	Report	Duarte 21'; Wynder 56' (o.g.)

Estadio Único Madre de Ciudades, Santiago del Estero
Attendance: 18,474
Referee: Serdar Gözübüyük (Netherlands)

=== Semi-finals ===
8 June 2023
14:30

Uruguay	1–0	Israel
Duarte 61'	Report

Estadio Único Diego Armando Maradona, La Plata
Attendance: 27,860
Referee: José María Sánchez Martínez (Spain)

8 June 2023
18:00

Italy	2–1	South Korea
Casadei 14'; Pafundi 86'	Report	Lee Seung-won 23' (pen.)

Estadio Único Diego Armando Maradona, La Plata
Attendance: 20,998
Referee: Yael Falcón (Argentina)

=== Third place play-off ===
11 June 2023
14:30

Israel	3–1	South Korea
Binyamin 19'; Senior 76'; Khalaily 85'	Report	Lee Seung-won 24' (pen.)

Estadio Único Diego Armando Maradona, La Plata
Attendance: 15,327
Referee: Ramon Abatti (Brazil)

=== Final ===
11 June 2023
18:00

Uruguay	1–0	Italy
L. Rodríguez 86'	Report

Estadio Único Diego Armando Maradona, La Plata
Attendance: 38,297
Referee: Glenn Nyberg (Sweden)

== Awards ==
The following awards were given for the tournament:

Golden Ball	Silver Ball	Bronze Ball
(Italy) Cesare Casadei	(Uruguay) Alan Matturro	(South Korea) Lee Seung-won
Golden Boot	Silver Boot	Bronze Boot
(Italy) Cesare Casadei (7 goals, 2 assists)	(Brazil) Marcos Leonardo (5 goals, 1 assist)	(Colombia) Óscar Cortés (4 goals, 2 assists)
Golden Glove
(Italy) Sebastiano Desplanches
FIFA Fair Play Trophy
United States

== Goalscorers ==
There were 154 goals scored in 52 matches, for an average of 2.96 goals per match.

7 goals

- (Italy) Cesare Casadei

5 goals

- (Brazil) Marcos Leonardo

4 goals

- (Colombia) Óscar Cortés
- (Ecuador) Justin Cuero

3 goals

- (Argentina) Alejo Véliz
- (Colombia) Tomás Ángel
- (France) Alan Virginius
- (South Korea) Lee Seung-won
- (Israel) Anan Khalaily
- (United States) Cade Cowell
- (Uruguay) Anderson Duarte

2 goals

- (Argentina) Luka Romero
- (Brazil) Matheus Martins
- (Brazil) Jean Pedroso
- (Brazil) Andrey Santos
- (Colombia) Yáser Asprilla
- (Ecuador) José Klinger
- (Ecuador) Alan Minda
- (Ecuador) Cristhoper Zambrano
- (England) Alfie Devine
- (The Gambia) Adama Bojang
- (Israel) Dor Turgeman
- (Israel) Omer Senior
- (Italy) Tommaso Baldanzi
- (Slovakia) Timotej Jambor
- (Slovakia) Máté Szolgai
- (South Korea) Lee Young-jun
- (South Korea) Choi Seok-hyeon
- (Tunisia) Mahmoud Ghorbel
- (Uruguay) Matías Abaldo
- (Uruguay) Franco González
- (Uzbekistan) Shakhzodjon Nematjonov

1 goal

- (Argentina) Brian Aguirre
- (Argentina) Valentín Carboni
- (Argentina) Gino Infantino
- (Argentina) Ignacio Maestro Puch
- (Argentina) Máximo Perrone
- (Brazil) Giovane
- (Brazil) Marlon Gomes
- (Brazil) Marquinhos
- (Brazil) Matheus Nascimento
- (Brazil) Sávio
- (Colombia) Gustavo Puerta
- (Colombia) Jhojan Torres
- (Dominican Republic) Edison Azcona
- (Ecuador) Tommy Chamba
- (Ecuador) Sebastián González
- (Ecuador) Kendry Páez
- (England) Darko Gyabi
- (England) Bashir Humphreys
- (England) Dane Scarlett
- (France) Félix Nzouango
- (France) Wilson Odobert
- (The Gambia) Mamin Sanyang
- (Honduras) Marco Aceituno
- (Honduras) Isaac Castillo
- (Honduras) Odín Ramos
- (Honduras) David Ruiz
- (Israel) Roy Navi
- (Israel) Hamza Shibli
- (Israel) Ran Binyamin
- (Italy) Giuseppe Ambrosino
- (Italy) Francesco Esposito
- (Italy) Simone Pafundi
- (Italy) Matteo Prati
- (Japan) Kuryu Matsuki
- (Japan) Isa Sakamoto
- (Japan) Riku Yamane
- (New Zealand) Norman Garbett
- (New Zealand) Jay Herdman
- (New Zealand) Benjamin Wallace
- (Nigeria) Salim Lawal
- (Nigeria) Samson Lawal
- (Nigeria) Ibrahim Beji Muhammad
- (Nigeria) Rilwanu Sarki
- (Nigeria) Jude Sunday
- (Senegal) Mamadou Lamine Camara
- (Senegal) Pape Demba Diop
- (Slovakia) Artur Gajdoš
- (Slovakia) Adam Gaži
- (South Korea) Kim Yong-hak
- (South Korea) Park Seung-ho
- (South Korea) Bae Jun-ho
- (Tunisia) Chaïm El Djebali
- (Tunisia) Youssef Snana
- (United States) Justin Che
- (United States) Jonathan Gómez
- (United States) Diego Luna
- (United States) Rokas Pukštas
- (United States) Niko Tsakiris
- (United States) Caleb Wiley
- (United States) Owen Wolff
- (Uruguay) Andrés Ferrari
- (Uruguay) Alan Matturro
- (Uruguay) Luciano Rodríguez
- (Uzbekistan) Sherzod Esanov
- (Uzbekistan) Abbosbek Fayzullaev
- (Uzbekistan) Makhmudjon Makhamadjonov

1 own goal

- (Dominican Republic) Guillermo de Peña (against Nigeria)
- (France) Tanguy Zoukrou (against Gambia)
- (Iraq) Hussein Hassan (against Uruguay)
- (Senegal) Babacar N'Diaye (against Israel)
- (United States) Joshua Wynder (against Uruguay)

== Final ranking ==
As per statistical convention in football, matches decided in extra time are counted as wins and losses, while matches decided by penalty shoot-outs are counted as draws.

Pos	Team	Pld	W	D	L	GF	GA	GD	Pts	Final result
1	Uruguay	7	6	0	1	12	3	+9	18	Champions
2	Italy	7	5	0	2	13	8	+5	15	Runners-up
3	Israel	7	4	1	2	11	8	+3	13	Third place
4	South Korea	7	3	2	2	10	10	0	11	Fourth place
5	United States	5	4	0	1	10	2	+8	12	Eliminated in Quarter-finals
6	Colombia	5	3	1	1	11	7	+4	10	Eliminated in Quarter-finals
7	Brazil	5	3	0	2	16	7	+9	9	Eliminated in Quarter-finals
8	Nigeria	5	3	0	2	6	4	+2	9	Eliminated in Quarter-finals
9	Argentina (H)	4	3	0	1	10	3	+7	9	Eliminated in Round of 16
10	England	4	2	1	1	5	4	+1	7	Eliminated in Round of 16
11	Gambia	4	2	1	1	4	3	+1	7	Eliminated in Round of 16
12	Ecuador	4	2	0	2	13	5	+8	6	Eliminated in Round of 16
13	Uzbekistan	4	1	1	2	5	5	0	4	Eliminated in Round of 16
14	New Zealand	4	1	1	2	3	11	−8	4	Eliminated in Round of 16
15	Tunisia	4	1	0	3	4	6	−2	3	Eliminated in Round of 16
16	Slovakia	4	1	0	3	6	9	−3	3	Eliminated in Round of 16
17	France	3	1	0	2	5	5	0	3	Eliminated in Group stage
18	Japan	3	1	0	2	3	4	−1	3	Eliminated in Group stage
19	Senegal	3	0	2	1	2	3	−1	2	Eliminated in Group stage
20	Honduras	3	0	1	2	4	7	−3	1	Eliminated in Group stage
21	Iraq	3	0	1	2	0	7	−7	1	Eliminated in Group stage
22	Guatemala	3	0	0	3	0	6	−6	0	Eliminated in Group stage
23	Dominican Republic	3	0	0	3	1	11	−10	0	Eliminated in Group stage
24	Fiji	3	0	0	3	0	16	−16	0	Eliminated in Group stage

Source: Techn. Report p. 6
(H) Hosts

== Marketing ==
=== Development and preparation ===
In early May 2023 - before the removal of Indonesia as the host, FIFA announced that the official song of the tournament would be "Glorious", performed by the Indonesian EDM group Weird Genius and featuring three other Indonesian stars: Lyodra Ginting, Tiara Andini and Ziva Magnolya. The remixed version of the song would later being used at the 2023 FIFA U-17 World Cup held later that year in Indonesia.

=== Broadcasting rights ===
Live stream is available on FIFA+, while in Indonesia, available on Moji and Vidio, including replays.

=== Sponsorship ===
FIFA partners	National Supporters
Adidas; Coca-Cola; Hyundai; Visa; Wanda Group	Globant; Inter Rapidisimo

== Controversies ==
=== Protests against Israel's participation and Indonesia's removal as hosts ===
By finishing second in the 2022 UEFA European Under-19 Championship, Israel qualified to the U-20 World Cup for the first time in history. However, Israel's participation is subject to political controversy due to Indonesia having the world's largest Muslim population and the two countries having no formal relations owing to the Israeli–Palestinian conflict. Given this, Indonesian Minister of Youth and Sports Zainudin Amali stated that FIFA required any country qualified for the U-20 World Cup shall play, and that the local security officers will provide security for the Israeli team.

Despite attempts to confirm Israel's participation, Israel's involvement led to Indonesia coming under scrutiny by various pro-Palestinian organisations. Various Islamist organisations in Indonesia have threatened Israeli players, stating that the Israeli team is not welcome in Indonesia. Meanwhile Nahdlatul Ulama figures such as its leader, Yahya Cholil Staquf and Indonesian Minister of Religious Affairs, Yaqut Cholil Qoumas voiced support for Israel's participation.

Initially, six regional governmental heads (the Governor of Jakarta, Mayor of Surabaya, Governor of West Java for Bandung, Mayor of Solo, Governor of Bali for Gianyar, Bali, and the Governor of South Sumatra for Palembang) signed the original agreement on willingness to be the host for the world cup. However, the Governor of Bali, I Wayan Koster as well as the Governor of Central Java (where Solo is located), Ganjar Pranowo, both members of the ruling party PDIP, subsequently stated their objection of hosting the Israeli team, citing 'anti-colonial' stances of Sukarno rather than religious ones.

The Palestinian Ambassador to Indonesia Zuhair Al-Shun said that his country has no objections to Indonesia's hosting of the tournament, despite Israel's qualification.

On 28 March 2023, Indonesian President Joko Widodo, in a break with his party, voiced his own support to Israeli participation, and implored his people to not mix politics and sport. The Mayor of Solo, Gibran Rakabuming Raka, Joko Widodo's son, expressed disappointment with the governor's decision and willingness to hold match draw in Solo, and Bandung. A last minute effort was made to rescue Indonesia's role as host while still acknowledging the country's concerns, but on 29 March, FIFA officially stripped Indonesia as host for the tournament, stating "current circumstances" as the reasoning without specifying the details.

== See also ==
- 2023 FIFA U-17 World Cup
