= Alan Matturro =

Uruguayan footballer (born 2004)

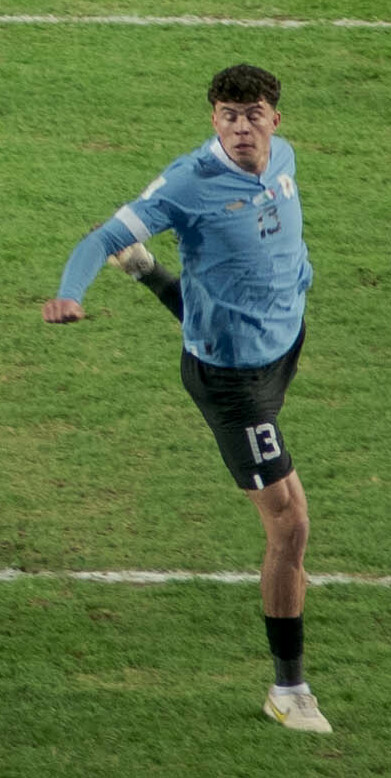
- Matturro playing for Uruguay at the 2023 FIFA U-20 World Cup final

Personal information
- Full name: Alan Agustín Matturro Romero
- Date of birth: 11 October 2004 (age 22)
- Place of birth: Montevideo, Uruguay
- Height: 1.89 m (6 ft 2 in)
- Position: Centre-back

Team information
- Current team: Shakhtar Donetsk
- Number: 28

Youth career
- 2016–2021: Defensor Sporting

Senior career*
Years	Team	Apps	(Gls)
2021–2023	Defensor Sporting	25	(1)
2023–2026	Genoa	21	(0)
2025–2026	→ Levante (loan)	19	(1)
2026–	Shakhtar Donetsk	2	(0)

International career
2019	Uruguay U15	9	(0)
2022–2023	Uruguay U20	15	(1)
Medal record
Men's football
Representing Uruguay
FIFA U-20 World Cup
Winner	2023 Argentina
- * Club domestic league appearances and goals as of 17 October 2026

Alan Agustín Matturro Romero (born 11 October 2004) is a Uruguayan professional footballer who plays as a centre-back for Ukrainian Premier League club Shakhtar Donetsk.

== Early life ==
Matturro was born on 11 October 2004 in the capital city of Montevideo to a family of Italian descent. His ancestors immigrated from Balvano in Potenza, a province of the Basilicata region, thus holds an Italian passport. In July 2021, Matturro's mother, Silvana (née Romero), died of complications from SARS-CoV-2 amidst the COVID-19 pandemic.

== Club career ==
=== Defensor Sporting ===
Matturro is a youth academy graduate of Defensor Sporting. He joined the club at the age of 12 as a centre-forward.

=== Genoa ===
On 21 December 2022, Matturro joined Italian club Genoa.

==== Loan to Levante ====
On 9 July 2025, Matturro joined La Liga side Levante on a season-long loan deal.

== International career ==
=== Youth ===
Matturro is a former Uruguayan youth international. He has represented Uruguay at 2019 South American U-15 Championship. He was also part of the Uruguayan side that won the 2023 FIFA U-20 World Cup in Argentina. In the tournament, he received the Silver Ball award as the second-best player behind only Cesare Casadei.

=== Senior ===
On 4 March 2024, Matturro received his first call-up to represent the Uruguay national team under Marcelo Bielsa for matchdays 13 and 14 against Argentina and Bolivia for the 2026 FIFA World Cup qualifiers.

== Career statistics ==
As of match played 17 October 2026

Appearances and goals by club, season and competition
Club	Season	League			Cup		Continental		Other		Total	
Club	Season	Division	Apps	Goals	Apps	Goals	Apps	Goals	Apps	Goals	Apps	Goals
Defensor Sporting	2021	Uruguayan Segunda División	3	0	—		—		4 (Note: Appearances in Segunda División playoffs.)	1	7	1
Defensor Sporting	2022	Uruguayan Primera División	22	1	4	1	—		—		26	2
Defensor Sporting	Total		25	1	4	1	0	0	4	1	33	3
Genoa	2022–23	Serie B	2	0	0	0	—		—		2	0
Genoa	2023–24	Serie A	6	0	2	0	—		—		8	0
Genoa	2024–25	Serie A	13	0	1	0	—		—		14	0
Genoa	Total		21	0	3	0	—		—		24	0
Levante (loan)	2025–26	La Liga	19	1	2	0	—		—		21	1
Shakhtar Donetsk	2026–27	Ukrainian Premier League	2	0	0	0	0	0	—		2	0
Career total			67	2	9	1	0	0	4	1	80	4

== Honours ==
Defensor Sporting

- Copa Uruguay: 2022

Uruguay U20

- FIFA U-20 World Cup: 2023

Individual

- FIFA U-20 World Cup Silver Ball: 2023
