= 2023 FIFA U-20 World Cup final =

- Event: 2023 FIFA U-20 World Cup
Uruguay	Italy
(Uruguay)	(Italy)
1	0
- Date: 11 June 2023
- Venue: La Plata Stadium, La Plata
- Referee: Glenn Nyberg (Sweden)
- Attendance: 38,297
- Weather: Clear; 8 °C (46 °F)

The 2023 FIFA U-20 World Cup final was the final match and culmination of the 2023 FIFA U-20 World Cup, hosted by Argentina. The match was played at the La Plata Stadium in La Plata on 11 June 2023, and was contested by Italy and Uruguay. Uruguay won the match after defeating Italy 1–0, winning their first U-20 title. It was the country's first major title since the 2011 Copa America and their first world title since the 1950 FIFA World Cup, both with their senior national team.

== Road to the final ==
Uruguay
Round
Italy
Opponent
Result
Group stage
Opponent
Result
Iraq
4–0
Match 1
Brazil
3–2
England
2–3
Match 2
Nigeria
0–2
Tunisia
1–0
Match 3
Dominican Republic
3–0
Group E runners-up

Pos	Team	Pld	W	D	L	GF	GA	GD	Pts	Qualification
1	England	3	2	1	0	4	2	+2	7	Knockout stage
2	Uruguay	3	2	0	1	7	3	+4	6	Knockout stage
3	Tunisia	3	1	0	2	3	2	+1	3	Knockout stage
4	Iraq	3	0	1	2	0	7	−7	1	

Source: FIFA
Rules for classification: Group stage tiebreakers
Final standings
Group D runners-up

Pos	Team	Pld	W	D	L	GF	GA	GD	Pts	Qualification
1	Brazil	3	2	0	1	10	3	+7	6	Knockout stage
2	Italy	3	2	0	1	6	4	+2	6	Knockout stage
3	Nigeria	3	2	0	1	4	3	+1	6	Knockout stage
4	Dominican Republic	3	0	0	3	1	11	−10	0	

Source: FIFA
Rules for classification: Group stage tiebreakers
Opponent
Result
Knockout stage
Opponent
Result
Gambia
1–0
Round of 16
England
2–1
United States
2–0
Quarter-finals
Colombia
3–1
Israel
1–0
Semi-finals
South Korea
2–1

== Match ==
=== Details ===
11 June 2023
18:00

Uruguay	1–0	Italy
L. Rodríguez 86'	Report

Estadio Único Diego Armando Maradona, La Plata
Attendance: 38,297
Referee: Glenn Nyberg (Sweden)

Uruguay	Italy

GK	12	Randall Rodríguez
CB	2	Sebastián Boselli
CB	16	Facundo González
CB	13	Alan Matturro
CM	8	Rodrigo Chagas
CM	5	Fabricio Díaz (c)	(yellow card) 90+12'
CM	14	Damián García
RW	11	Juan Cruz de los Santos		(substituted off) 90+2'
AM	10	Franco González
LW	7	Anderson Duarte		(substituted off) 62'
CF	19	Luciano Rodríguez		(substituted off) 90+6'
Substitutions:
FW	9	Andrés Ferrari		(substituted on) 62'
MF	15	Ignacio Sosa		(substituted on) 90+2'
MF	18	Santiago Homenchenko		(substituted on) 90+6'
Coach:
Marcelo Broli

GK	1	Sebastiano Desplanches
RB	4	Matteo Prati	(yellow card) 83'
CB	5	Daniele Ghilardi
CB	14	Gabriele Guarino	(yellow card) 33'
LB	3	Riccardo Turicchia
DM	16	Giacomo Faticanti		(substituted off) 46'
RM	8	Cesare Casadei
LM	6	Samuel Giovane (c)		(substituted off) 89'
AM	10	Tommaso Baldanzi		(substituted off) 89'
CF	20	Simone Pafundi		(substituted off) 56'
CF	9	Giuseppe Ambrosino	(yellow card) 47'	(substituted off) 56'
Substitutions:
DF	2	Mattia Zanotti	(yellow card) 90'	(substituted on) 46'
FW	18	Francesco Pio Esposito		(substituted on) 56'
FW	11	Daniele Montevago		(substituted on) 56'
MF	7	Niccolò Pisilli		(substituted on) 89'
MF	17	Luca Lipani	(yellow card) 90+12'	(substituted on) 89'
Coach:
Carmine Nunziata

Assistant referees:
Mahbod Beigi (Sweden)
Andreas Söderkvist (Sweden)
Fourth official:
Juan Gabriel Calderón (Costa Rica)
Reserve assistant referee:
William Arrieta (Costa Rica)
Video assistant referees:
Fedayi San (Switzerland)
Assistant video assistant referee:
Tatiana Guzmán (Nicaragua)
Support video assistant referee:
Juan Lara (Chile)

Match rules:

- 90 minutes.
- 30 minutes of extra time if necessary.
- Penalty shoot-out if scores still level.
