= Jude Sunday =

Nigerian association football player

Personal information
- Full name: Jude Cide Sunday
- Date of birth: 4 October 2004 (age 22)
- Position: Winger

Team information
- Current team: Dynamo České Budějovice
- Number: 32

Youth career
- Real Sapphire FC

Senior career*
Years	Team	Apps	(Gls)
2023–2025	Trenčín	56	(2)
2025–	Dynamo České Budějovice	17	(1)

International career^{‡}
2023	Nigeria U20	12	(4)
- * Club domestic league appearances and goals as of 27 May 2026 ‡ National team caps and goals as of 24 June 2025

Jude Cide Sunday (born 4 October 2004) is a Nigerian football player who plays as an attacker for Dynamo České Budějovice in the Czech National Football League.

== Club career ==
He played in his homeland for Lagos-based team Real Sapphire FC. He signed for AS Trencin in July 2023. He scored his first goals for Trencin in the Slovak Cup in August 2023, against MFK Vrbové.

On 21 August 2025, Sunday signed a contract with Czech National Football League club Dynamo České Budějovice until 30 June 2028.

== International career ==
He was a member of the Nigeria U20 team at the 2023 U-20 Africa Cup of Nations. He scored twice in the tournament, and was awarded the man-of-the-match award in the third place play-off against Tunisia U20. He was selected for the Nigeria U20 squad for the 2023 FIFA U-20 World Cup. He scored during the tournament against Italy U20.

== Style of play ==
He is described as versatile attacker who can operate as a striker or as a winger.
