= Luciano Rodríguez =

Uruguayan football player (born 2003)

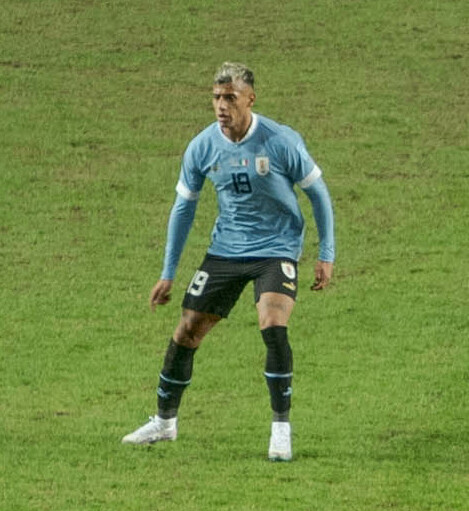
- Rodríguez with Uruguay U20 in 2023

Personal information
- Full name: Luciano Rodríguez Rosales
- Date of birth: 16 July 2003 (age 23)
- Place of birth: Montevideo, Uruguay
- Height: 1.79 m (5 ft 10 in)
- Position: Forward

Team information
- Current team: Cruzeiro (on loan from Neom)
- Number: 97

Youth career
- Bella Vista
- Progreso

Senior career*
Years	Team	Apps	(Gls)
2021–2022	Progreso	51	(7)
2023–2024	Liverpool Montevideo	43	(14)
2024–2025	Bahia	42	(11)
2025–	Neom	30	(6)
2026–	→ Cruzeiro (loan)	6	(0)

International career^{‡}
2021–2023	Uruguay U20	39	(11)
2024	Uruguay U23	6	(6)
2024–	Uruguay	5	(0)
Medal record
Men's football
Representing Uruguay
FIFA U-20 World Cup
Winner	2023 Argentina
South American U-20 Championship
Runner-up	2023 Colombia
- * Club domestic league appearances and goals as of 18 October 2026 ‡ National team caps and goals as of 10 October 2025

Luciano Rodríguez Rosales (born 16 July 2003) is a Uruguayan professional footballer who plays as a forward for Campeonato Brasileiro Série A club Cruzeiro, on loan from Saudi Pro League club Neom, and the Uruguay national team.

== Club career ==
=== Progreso ===
Rodríguez is a youth academy graduate of Progreso. He made his professional debut for the club on 17 January 2021 in a goalless draw against Montevideo City Torque.

=== Liverpool Montevideo ===
On 27 December 2022, Liverpool Montevideo announced the signing of Rodríguez. In 2023, he was a member of the squad that won the Uruguayan Primera División for the first time.

=== Bahia ===
On 26 July 2024, Rodríguez joined Brazilian club Bahia on a five-year contract, making him the most expensive signing in club's history. He scored his first goal for the club on 7 August 2024 in a 1–0 cup win against Botafogo. He helped the club win the 2025 Copa do Nordeste by scoring in both legs of the final, which also turned out to be his last two matches for Bahia.

=== Neom ===
On 10 September 2025, Rodríguez joined newly promoted Saudi Pro League club Neom on a five-year contract. He scored his first goal for the club on 27 September in a 3–2 league win against Al-Riyadh.

==== Loan to Cruzeiro ====
On 6 August 2026, Rodríguez returned to Brazil by joining top-division club Cruzeiro on a one-year loan.

== International career ==
Rodríguez has represented Uruguay at various youth levels. In January 2023, he was named in Uruguay's squad for the 2023 South American U-20 Championship. He was then a part of the Uruguayan side that won the 2023 FIFA U-20 World Cup, having scored the winning goal in the final match against Italy.

In June 2023, Rodríguez received his first call-up to the senior team for friendlies against Nicaragua and Cuba. In January 2024, he was named in Uruguay's squad for the 2024 CONMEBOL Pre-Olympic Tournament. He made his debut for the Uruguay national team on 23 March 2024 in a 1–1 draw against Basque Country.

== Personal life ==
Luciano's twin brother Emiliano Rodríguez is also a professional footballer.

== Career statistics ==
=== Club ===
As of match played 21 May 2026

Appearances and goals by club, season and competition
Club	Season	League			State league (Note: Includes Campeonato Baiano)		National cup (Note: Includes Copa Uruguay, Copa do Brasil, King's Cup)		Continental		Other		Total	
Club	Season	Division	Apps	Goals	Apps	Goals	Apps	Goals	Apps	Goals	Apps	Goals	Apps	Goals
Progreso	2020	UPD	4	0	—		—		—		—		4	0
Progreso	2021	UPD	24	2	—		—		—		—		24	2
Progreso	2022	USD	23	5	—		3	0	—		—		26	5
Progreso	Total		51	7	0	0	3	0	0	0	0	0	54	7
Liverpool Montevideo	2023	UPD	27	9	—		2	1	3 (Note: Appearances in Copa Libertadores)	0	4 (Note: Three appearances in championship play-offs; one appearance in Torneo Intermedio final)	0	36	10
Liverpool Montevideo	2024	UPD	16	5	—		0	0	5	2	0	0	21	7
Liverpool Montevideo	Total		43	14	0	0	2	1	8	2	4	0	57	17
Bahia	2024	Série A	19	6	—		3	1	—		—		22	7
Bahia	2025	Série A	18	2	5	3	5	2	12 (Note: Ten appearances, one goal in Copa Libertadores; two appearances in Copa Sudamericana)	1	7 (Note: Appearances in Copa do Nordeste)	5	47	13
Bahia	Total		37	8	5	3	8	3	12	1	7	5	69	20
Neom	2025–26	Saudi Pro League	30	6	—		1	0	—		—		31	6
Cruzeiro (loan)	2026	Série A	0	0	—		0	0	0	0	—		0	0
Career total			161	35	5	3	14	4	20	3	11	5	211	50

=== International ===
As of match played 10 October 2025

Appearances and goals by national team and year
National team	Year	Apps	Goals
Uruguay	2024	4 (Note: Includes a Non-FIFA friendly played against the Basque Country, which is counted as an official match by the Uruguayan Football Association.)	0
Uruguay	2025	1	0
Total		5	0

== Honours ==
Liverpool Montevideo

- Uruguayan Primera División: 2023

Bahia

- Copa do Nordeste: 2025
- Campeonato Baiano: 2025

Uruguay U20

- FIFA U-20 World Cup: 2023
- South American U-20 Championship runner-up: 2023

Individual

- Uruguayan Primera División Young Player of the Year: 2023
- Uruguayan Primera División Team of the Year: 2023
