= Jhojan Torres =

Colombian footballer (born 2004)

Personal information
- Full name: Jhojan Camilo Torres Guazá
- Date of birth: 12 January 2003 (age 23)
- Place of birth: Cali, Colombia
- Height: 1.78 m (5 ft 10 in)
- Positions: Forward; midfielder

Team information
- Current team: Independiente Santa Fe
- Number: 14

Youth career
- Talentos FC
- Independiente Santa Fe

Senior career*
Years	Team	Apps	(Gls)
2022–	Independiente Santa Fe	116	(4)

International career^{‡}
2022–	Colombia U20	14	(0)
2023–	Colombia U23	4	(0)
- * Club domestic league appearances and goals as of 11 December 2025 ‡ National team caps and goals as of 9 November 2023

Jhojan Camilo Torres Guazá (born 12 January 2003) is a Colombian footballer who currently plays as a forward for Independiente Santa Fe.

== Club career ==
Born in Cali, Torres began his career with grassroots club Talentos FC. He went on to trial with professional side Independiente Santa Fe, impressing coach Léider Preciado and earning a place in the academy.

In November 2022, having established himself in the Independiente Santa Fe first team, Torres was reportedly scouted by English sides Watford and Manchester City. The following season, Independiente Santa Fe manager at the time, Harold Rivera, confirmed that both Torres and teammate Kevin Mantilla would be released to the Colombian under-20 squad ahead of the 2023 FIFA U-20 World Cup, despite being first team players.

== International career ==
Torres was called up to the Colombian under-20 squad for the 2023 South American U-20 Championship, where his performances were praised, despite receiving a red card in a 0–0 draw with Brazil.

Ahead of the 2023 FIFA U-20 World Cup, Torres stated that he was hoping to be called up to the final squad.

== Personal life ==
Torres is nicknamed "Kanté" after French footballer N'Golo Kanté, as the two share a vague resemblance. He has stated that he does not mind the comparison, but that there is "only one 'Kanté' and only one Jhojan Torres".

== Career statistics ==
=== Club ===
As of 2 June 2023.

Appearances and goals by club, season and competition
Club	Season	League			Cup		Continental		Other		Total	
Club	Season	Division	Apps	Goals	Apps	Goals	Apps	Goals	Apps	Goals	Apps	Goals
Independiente Santa Fe	2022	Categoría Primera A	16	1	0	0	0	0	0	0	16	1
Independiente Santa Fe	2023	Categoría Primera A	7	1	0	0	4 (Note: Appearances in the Copa Sudamericana)	0	0	0	11	1
Career total			23	2	0	0	4	0	0	0	27	2
