= Omer Senior =

Israeli footballer

Personal information
- Date of birth: 23 February 2003 (age 23)
- Place of birth: Tel Aviv, Israel
- Height: 1.71 m (5 ft 7 in)
- Positions: Winger; forward

Team information
- Current team: Ironi Modi'in

Senior career*
Years	Team	Apps	(Gls)
2020–2024	Hapoel Tel Aviv	63	(4)
2024–2025	Hapoel Hadera	15	(1)
2025–2026	Hapoel Ramat Gan	11	(1)
2026	Hapoel Ra'anana	13	(0)
2026–	Ironi Modi'in	0	(0)

International career^{‡}
2018–2019	Israel U16	6	(1)
2019	Israel U17	1	(0)
2021–2022	Israel U19	11	(1)
2023	Israel U20	3	(2)
Medal record
Representing Israel U-20
FIFA U-20 World Cup
Third place	2023 Argentina	Team
- * Club domestic league appearances and goals as of 24 June 2026 ‡ National team caps and goals as of 28 May 2023

Omer Senior (Hebrew: עומר סניור; born 23 February 2003) is an Israeli footballer who plays as a winger or as a forward for Liga Leumit club Ironi Modi'in.

== Early life ==
Senior was born and raised in Tel Aviv, Israel, to an Israeli family of Sephardic and of Ashkenazi (Polish-Jewish) descent.

He also holds a Polish passport, on account of his Ashkenazi (Polish-Jewish) ancestors, which eases the move to certain European football leagues.

== Club career ==
Senior plays for the senior side of Israeli Premier League club Hapoel Ra’anana as a winger or as a forward since 2026.

== Career statistics ==
=== Club ===
As of 1 June 2024.

Club	Season	League			State Cup		Toto Cup		Continental		Other		Total	
Club	Season	Division	Apps	Goals	Apps	Goals	Apps	Goals	Apps	Goals	Apps	Goals	Apps	Goals
Hapoel Tel Aviv	2020–21	Israeli Premier League	1	0	0	0	0	0	–		0	0	1	0
Hapoel Tel Aviv	2021–22	Israeli Premier League	11	0	0	0	0	0	–		0	0	11	0
Hapoel Tel Aviv	2022–23	Israeli Premier League	23	1	0	0	5	1	–		0	0	28	1
Hapoel Tel Aviv	2023–24	Israeli Premier League	21	3	1	0	3	0	–		0	0	25	3
Hapoel Tel Aviv	Total		56	4	1	0	8	1	0	0	0	0	65	4
Hapoel Hadera	2024–25	Israeli Premier League	15	1	2	1	0	0	–		0	0	17	2
Hapoel Hadera	Total		15	1	2	1	0	0	0	0	0	0	17	2
Hapoel Ramat Gan	2025–26	Liga Leumit	0	0	0	0	0	0	–		0	0	0	0
Hapoel Ramat Gan	Total		0	0	0	0	0	0	0	0	0	0	0	0
Career total			71	5	3	1	8	1	0	0	0	0	82	6

== See also ==
- List of Jewish footballers
- List of Jews in sports
- List of Israelis
