= 2025 Copa do Nordeste =

Tournament details
- Country: Brazil
- Dates: 21 January – 6 September
- Teams: 16

Final positions
- Champions: Bahia (5th title)
- Runners-up: Confiança
- 2026 Copa do Brasil: Bahia

Tournament statistics
- Matches played: 64
- Goals scored: 161 (2.52 per match)

The 2025 Copa do Nordeste (officially the Copa do Nordeste 2025 SUPERBET for sponsorship reasons) was the 22nd edition of the main football tournament featuring teams from the Brazilian Northeast Region. The competition featured 16 clubs, with Bahia, Ceará and Pernambuco having two seeds each, and Alagoas, Maranhão, Paraíba, Piauí, Rio Grande do Norte and Sergipe with one seed each. Four teams were decided by a qualifying tournament (Eliminatórias da Copa do Nordeste 2025). The Copa do Nordeste began on 21 January and ended on 6 September 2025.

Fortaleza were the defending champions.

== Format ==
This season, 12 teams (9 state league champions and best placed teams in the 2024 CBF ranking from Ceará, Bahia and Pernambuco) earned direct entry into the group stage while the other four berths were determined by the Eliminatórias da Copa do Nordeste.

For the group stage, the 16 teams were drawn into two groups. Each group was played on a single round-robin basis. The top four teams qualified for the final stages. The quarter-finals and semi-finals will be played on a single-leg basis, while the finals will be played on a home-and-away two-legged basis.

== Qualification ==
The 2025 Copa do Nordeste qualification (officially the Eliminatórias da Copa do Nordeste 2025) was the qualifying tournament of the 2025 Copa do Nordeste. It was played from 4 to 8 January 2025. Sixteen teams competed to decide four places in the Copa do Nordeste. The teams entered in two rounds where the four winners advanced to the Copa do Nordeste.

The winners were CSA (Alagoas), Ferroviário (Ceará), Juazeirense (Bahia) and Moto Club (Maranhão).

== Teams ==
The qualified teams are

Association	Team	Qualification method
(Alagoas) Alagoas; 1 + 1 berths	CRB	2024 Campeonato Alagoano champions
(Alagoas) Alagoas; 1 + 1 berths	CSA	2025 Copa do Nordeste qualification
(Bahia) Bahia; 2 + 1 berths	Vitória	2024 Campeonato Baiano champions
(Bahia) Bahia; 2 + 1 berths	Bahia	best placed team in the 2024 CBF ranking not already qualified
(Bahia) Bahia; 2 + 1 berths	Juazeirense	2025 Copa do Nordeste qualification
(Ceará) Ceará; 2 + 1 berths	Ceará	2024 Campeonato Cearense champions
(Ceará) Ceará; 2 + 1 berths	Fortaleza	best placed team in the 2024 CBF ranking not already qualified
(Ceará) Ceará; 2 + 1 berths	Ferroviário	2025 Copa do Nordeste qualification
(Maranhão) Maranhão; 1 + 1 berths	Sampaio Corrêa	2024 Campeonato Maranhense champions
(Maranhão) Maranhão; 1 + 1 berths	Moto Club	2025 Copa do Nordeste qualification
(Paraíba) Paraíba; 1 berth	Sousa	2024 Campeonato Paraibano champions
(Pernambuco) Pernambuco; 2 berths	Sport	2024 Campeonato Pernambucano champions
(Pernambuco) Pernambuco; 2 berths	Náutico	best placed team in the 2024 CBF ranking not already qualified
(Piauí) Piauí; 1 berth	Altos	2024 Campeonato Piauiense champions
(Rio Grande do Norte) Rio Grande do Norte; 1 berth	América de Natal	2024 Campeonato Potiguar champions
(Sergipe) Sergipe; 1 berth	Confiança	2024 Campeonato Sergipano champions

== Schedule ==
The schedule of the competition is as follows.

Stage	First leg	Second leg
Group Stage	Round 1: 22 January	
Group Stage	Round 2: 5 February	
Group Stage	Round 3: 12 February	
Group Stage	Round 4: 19 and 26 February	
Group Stage	Round 5: 5 and 12 March	
Group Stage	Round 6: 19 March	
Group Stage	Round 7: 23 March	
Quarter-finals	4 June	
Semi-finals	8 June	
Finals	3 September	7 September

== Draw ==
The draw for the group stage was held on 14 January 2025, 20:00, at the Hotel Grand Hyatt in Rio de Janeiro. The teams were seeded into four pots based on the 2024 CBF ranking (shown in parentheses). They were drawn into two groups of eight containing two teams from each of the pots with the restriction that teams from the same federation could not be drawn into the same group. If there were three or more qualified teams from the same federation, the two best teams in the CBF ranking would be allocated in different groups.

Group stage draw
Pot 1	Pot 2	Pot 3	Pot 4
(Ceará) Fortaleza (9); Bahia (13); Ceará (18); (Pernambuco) Sport (24)	(Alagoas) CRB (26); (Bahia) Vitória (28); (Alagoas) CSA (31); (Maranhão) Sampaio Corrêa (33)	(Pernambuco) Náutico (38); (Sergipe) Confiança (51); (Ceará) Ferroviário (53); (Piauí) Altos (56)	(Rio Grande do Norte) América de Natal (58); (Bahia) Juazeirense (63); (Maranhão) Moto Club (86); (Paraíba) Sousa (90)

== Group stage ==
For the group stage, the 16 teams were drawn into two groups of eight teams each. Each group was played on a single round-robin basis. The top four teams of each group advanced to the quarter-finals of the knockout stages. The teams were ranked according to points (3 points for a win, 1 point for a draw, and 0 points for a loss). If tied on points, the following criteria would be used to determine the ranking: 1. Wins; 2. Goal difference; 3. Goals scored; 4. Fewest red cards; 5. Fewest yellow cards; 6. Draw in the headquarters of the Brazilian Football Confederation (Regulations Article 13).

=== Group A ===
Pos	Team	Pld	W	D	L	GF	GA	GD	Pts	Qualification	VIT	SPO	FER	FOR	CRB	ALT	MOT	SOU
1	(Bahia) Vitória	7	4	3	0	10	6	+4	15	Advance to Quarter-finals		1–0	2–1			1–1		1–0
2	(Pernambuco) Sport	7	4	0	3	11	7	+4	12	Advance to Quarter-finals				0–2	2–1	0–1	5–0	
3	(Ceará) Ferroviário	7	3	1	3	8	10	−2	10	Advance to Quarter-finals		1–2				1–0		2–0
4	(Ceará) Fortaleza	7	3	0	4	11	7	+4	9	Advance to Quarter-finals	1–2		4–0		0–1		2–0	
5	(Alagoas) CRB	7	2	3	2	12	10	+2	9		2–2		1–2				2–2	4–1
6	(Piauí) Altos	7	2	3	2	7	7	0	9					2–1	1–1		1–1	
7	(Maranhão) Moto Club	7	1	4	2	8	13	−5	7		1–1		1–1					3–1
8	(Paraíba) Sousa	7	2	0	5	7	14	−7	6			1–2		2–1		2–1		

Source: CBF
Legend: Blue = home team win; Yellow = draw; Red = away team win.

=== Group B ===
Pos	Team	Pld	W	D	L	GF	GA	GD	Pts	Qualification	BAH	CSA	CEA	CON	NAU	AME	JUA	SAM
1	Bahia	7	5	1	1	17	7	+10	16	Advance to Quarter-finals			3–2		3–1	5–1		4–0
2	(Alagoas) CSA	7	4	1	2	14	7	+7	13	Advance to Quarter-finals	1–2			2–1	4–1			4–0
3	Ceará	7	4	1	2	9	6	+3	13	Advance to Quarter-finals		1–0		1–1		1–0	2–0	
4	(Sergipe) Confiança	7	3	2	2	8	5	+3	11	Advance to Quarter-finals	2–0				1–0			2–0
5	(Pernambuco) Náutico	7	2	2	3	5	9	−4	8				1–0			1–0	0–0	
6	(Rio Grande do Norte) América de Natal	7	2	1	4	7	12	−5	7			0–1		2–1			2–1	
7	(Bahia) Juazeirense	7	1	4	2	4	6	−2	7		0–0	2–2		0–0				
8	(Maranhão) Sampaio Corrêa	7	0	2	5	4	16	−12	2				1–2		1–1	2–2	0–1	

Source: CBF
Legend: Blue = home team win; Yellow = draw; Red = away team win.

== Final stages ==
Starting from the quarter-finals, the teams played a single-elimination tournament with the following rules:

- Quarter-finals and semi-finals were played on a single-leg basis, with the higher-seeded team hosting the leg.
  - If tied, the penalty shoot-out would be used to determine the winners (Regulations Article 19).
- Finals were played on a home-and-away two-legged basis, with the higher-seeded team hosting the second leg.
  - If tied on aggregate, the penalty shoot-out would be used to determine the winners (Regulations Article 19).
- Extra time would not be played and away goals rule would not be used in final stages.

Starting from the semi-finals, the teams were seeded according to their performance in the tournament. The teams were ranked according to overall points. If tied on overall points, the following criteria would be used to determine the ranking: 1. Overall wins; 2. Overall goal difference; 3. Overall goals scored; 4. Fewest red cards in the tournament; 5. Fewest yellow cards in the tournament; 6. Draw in the headquarters of the Brazilian Football Confederation (Regulations Article 20).

=== Bracket ===
Quarter-finals
(Alagoas)	CSA	2
(Ceará)	Ferroviário	1
(Bahia)	Vitória	0
(Sergipe)	Confiança	1
(Bahia)	Bahia	2
(Ceará)	Fortaleza	1
(Pernambuco)	Sport	0 (2)
(Ceará)	Ceará (p)	0 (4)

Semi-finals
(Alagoas)	CSA	0
(Sergipe)	Confiança	1
(Bahia)	Bahia	1
(Ceará)	Ceará	0

Finals
(Sergipe)	Confiança	1	0	1
(Bahia)	Bahia	4	5	9

=== Quarter-finals ===
Team 1	Score	Team 2
Vitória (Bahia)	0–1	(Sergipe) Confiança
Sport (Pernambuco)	0–0 (2–4 p)	Ceará
Bahia	2–1	(Ceará) Fortaleza
CSA (Alagoas)	2–1	(Ceará) Ferroviário

==== Group C ====
8 July 2025
21:30

Vitória (Bahia)	0–1	(Sergipe) Confiança
	Report	Rafinha 90'

Barradão, Salvador
Referee: Paulo José Souza Mourão (Maranhão)

==== Group D ====
9 July 2025
21:30

Sport (Pernambuco)	0–0	Ceará
	Report
Penalties
Rivera (penalty missed); Lucas Lima (penalty missed); Atencio (penalty scored); Rafael Thyere (penalty scored)	2–4	(penalty scored) Pedro Raul; (penalty scored) Fernando Sobral; (penalty scored) Lourenço; (penalty missed) Matheus Araújo; (penalty scored) Matheus Bahia

Estádio Ilha do Retiro, Recife
Referee: Afro Rocha de Carvalho Filho (Paraíba)

==== Group E ====
9 July 2025
21:30

Bahia	2–1	(Ceará) Fortaleza
Willian José 39' (pen.); Caio Alexandre 45+6'	Report	Matheus Pereira 68'

Arena Fonte Nova, Salvador
Referee: Antônio Dib Moraes de Sousa (Piauí)

==== Group F ====
9 July 2025
19:00

CSA (Alagoas)	2–1	(Ceará) Ferroviário
Enzo 13' (pen.); Tiago Marques 19'	Report	Wesley Junio 44'

Estádio Rei Pelé, Maceió
Referee: Paulo Belence Alves dos Prazeres Filho (Pernambuco)

=== Semi-finals ===
Pos	Team	Pld	W	D	L	GF	GA	GD	Pts	Host
2	(Alagoas) CSA	8	5	1	2	16	8	+8	16	Host
3	(Sergipe) Confiança	8	4	2	2	9	5	+4	14	
1	Bahia	8	6	1	1	19	8	+11	19	Host
4	Ceará	8	4	2	2	9	6	+3	14	

Source: CBF

Team 1	Score	Team 2
CSA (Alagoas)	0–1	(Sergipe) Confiança
Bahia	1–0	Ceará

==== Group G ====
20 August 2025
21:30

CSA (Alagoas)	0–1	(Sergipe) Confiança
	Report	Thiago Santos 84'

Estádio Rei Pelé, Maceió
Referee: Paulo Belence Alves dos Prazeres Filho (Pernambuco)

==== Group H ====
20 August 2025
21:30

Bahia	1–0	Ceará
Tiago 90+3'	Report

Arena Fonte Nova, Salvador
Referee: Afro Rocha de Carvalho Filho (Paraíba)

=== Finals ===
Pos	Team	Pld	W	D	L	GF	GA	GD	Pts	Host
1	Bahia	9	7	1	1	20	8	+12	22	2nd leg
2	(Sergipe) Confiança	9	5	2	2	10	5	+5	17	1st leg

Source: CBF

Team 1	Agg.	Team 2	1st leg	2nd leg
Confiança (Sergipe)	1–9	Bahia	1–4	0–5

==== Group I ====
3 September 2025
21:30

Confiança (Sergipe)	1–4	Bahia
Ronald Camarão 49'	Report	Rodríguez 3'; Willian José 26'; Rodrigo Nestor 53'; Rezende 85'

Batistão, Aracaju
Referee: Rodrigo José Pereira de Lima (Pernambuco)

6 September 2025
17:30

Bahia	5–0	(Sergipe) Confiança
Tiago 4', 36', 39'; Rodríguez 10'; Rezende 17'	Report

Arena Fonte Nova, Salvador
Referee: Afro Rocha de Carvalho Filho (Paraíba)
