= 2025 Copa do Nordeste qualification =

Tournament details
- Country: Brazil
- Dates: 4 – 8 January 2025
- Teams: 16

Tournament statistics
- Matches played: 12
- Goals scored: 19 (1.58 per match)
- Top goal scorer: Thiago Alagoano (2 goals)

The 2025 Copa do Nordeste qualification (officially the Eliminatória da Copa do Nordeste 2025) was the qualifying tournament of the 2025 Copa do Nordeste. It was played from 4 to 8 January 2025. Sixteen teams competed to decide four places in the Copa do Nordeste.

== Format ==
The teams played a single-elimination tournament with the following rules:

- The tournament was played on a single-leg basis, with the higher-seeded team hosting the leg.
  - If tied, the penalty shoot-out was used to determine the winners.
- Extra time would not be played and away goals rule would not be used during the tournament.

== Qualified teams ==
Every federation had a team qualified by the 2024 CBF ranking, while the seven best placed federations in the 2024 CBF state ranking (Ceará, Bahia, Pernambuco, Alagoas, Maranhão, Rio Grande do Norte and Paraíba) earned an extra berth in the tournament by participating in their respective state championships.

Association	Team	Qualification method
(Alagoas) Alagoas; 2 berths	CSA	best placed team in the 2024 CBF ranking not already qualified
(Alagoas) Alagoas; 2 berths	ASA	2024 Campeonato Alagoano runners-up
(Bahia) Bahia; 2 berths	Juazeirense	best placed team in the 2024 CBF ranking not already qualified
(Bahia) Bahia; 2 berths	Barcelona de Ilhéus	2024 Campeonato Baiano 3rd place
(Ceará) Ceará; 2 berths	Ferroviário	best placed team in the 2024 CBF ranking not already qualified
(Ceará) Ceará; 2 berths	Maracanã	2024 Campeonato Cearense 3rd place
(Maranhão) Maranhão; 2 berths	Moto Club	best placed team in the 2024 CBF ranking not already qualified
(Maranhão) Maranhão; 2 berths	Maranhão	2024 Campeonato Maranhense runners-up
(Paraíba) Paraíba; 2 berths	Botafogo-PB	best placed team in the 2024 CBF ranking not already qualified
(Paraíba) Paraíba; 2 berths	Treze	2024 Campeonato Paraibano 3rd place
(Pernambuco) Pernambuco; 2 berths	Santa Cruz	best placed team in the 2024 CBF ranking not already qualified
(Pernambuco) Pernambuco; 2 berths	Retrô	2024 Campeonato Pernambucano 3rd place
(Piauí) Piauí; 1 berth	Fluminense-PI	best placed team in the 2024 CBF ranking not already qualified
(Rio Grande do Norte) Rio Grande do Norte; 2 berths	ABC	best placed team in the 2024 CBF ranking not already qualified
(Rio Grande do Norte) Rio Grande do Norte; 2 berths	Santa Cruz de Natal	2024 Campeonato Potiguar runners-up
(Sergipe) Sergipe; 1 berth	Sergipe	best placed team in the 2024 CBF ranking not already qualified

== Schedule ==
The schedule of the competition was as follows.

Round	First leg	Second leg
First round	4 January 2025	
Second round	8 January 2025	

== First round ==
=== Draw ===
The teams were seeded by their 2024 CBF ranking (shown in parentheses).

Pot
(Alagoas) CSA (31); (Rio Grande do Norte) ABC (40); (Ceará) Ferroviário (53); (Paraíba) Botafogo-PB (54); (Pernambuco) Santa Cruz (58); (Bahia) Juazeirense (63); (Pernambuco) Retrô (73); Sergipe (82)	(Alagoas) ASA (83); (Maranhão) Moto Club (86); (Piauí) Fluminense-PI (91); (Paraíba) Treze (107); Maranhão (135); (Rio Grande do Norte) Santa Cruz de Natal (217); (Ceará) Maracanã (no rank); (Bahia) Barcelona de Ilhéus (no rank)

For the first round, the sixteen teams were drawn into eight ties, with the best seeded team playing against the sixteenth seeded team, while the second-best seeded team facing the fifteenth-best, third against fourteenth, fourth against thirteenth, etc. The higher-seeded team hosted the leg.

=== Matches ===
Team 1	Score	Team 2
CSA (Alagoas)	1–0	(Bahia) Barcelona de Ilhéus
ABC (Rio Grande do Norte)	0–0 (4–5 p)	(Ceará) Maracanã
Ferroviário (Ceará)	0–0 (7–6 p)	(Rio Grande do Norte) Santa Cruz de Natal
Botafogo-PB (Paraíba)	1–0	Maranhão
Santa Cruz (Pernambuco)	1–2	(Paraíba) Treze
Juazeirense (Bahia)	3–3 (5–4 p)	(Piauí) Fluminense-PI
Retrô (Pernambuco)	1–1 (5–6 p)	(Maranhão) Moto Club
Sergipe	0–2	(Alagoas) ASA

4 January 2025
16:00

CSA (Alagoas)	1–0	(Bahia) Barcelona de Ilhéus
Guilherme Cachoeira 19'	Report

Estádio Rei Pelé, Maceió
Referee: Afro Rocha de Carvalho Filho (Paraíba)

4 January 2025
16:00

Santa Cruz (Pernambuco)	1–2	(Paraíba) Treze
Thiaguinho 55'	Report	Wandson 33'; Van 69'

Estádio do Arruda, Recife
Referee: Antônio Dib Moraes de Sousa (Piauí)

4 January 2025
16:00

Juazeirense (Bahia)	3–3	(Piauí) Fluminense-PI
Guilherme Silveira 11'; Jhúnior 36'; Tatá Baiano 65' (pen.)	Report	Gabriel Vieira 6'; Romarinho 29'; João Sala 84' (pen.)
Penalties
Zé Oliveira (penalty scored); Elivélton (penalty scored); Bruno Oliveira (penalty scored); Tatá Baiano (penalty scored); Júnior Santos (penalty scored)	5–4	(penalty scored) João Sala; (penalty scored) Everton; (penalty scored) Vitor Miguel; (penalty scored) Gabriel Biloca; (penalty missed) Gabriel Vieira

Estádio Adauto Moraes, Juazeiro
Referee: Márcio dos Santos Oliveira (Alagoas)

4 January 2025
16:00

Sergipe	0–2	(Alagoas) ASA
	Report	Thiago Alagoano 29' (pen.), 43'

Batistão, Aracaju
Referee: Marcelo de Lima Henrique (Ceará)

4 January 2025
19:30

ABC (Rio Grande do Norte)	0–0	(Ceará) Maracanã
	Report
Penalties
Wallyson (penalty scored); Bismark (penalty scored); Adeílson Maranhão (penalty scored); Robinho (penalty missed); Emanuel (penalty scored)	4–5	(penalty scored) Jair Berlitz; (penalty scored) Wendel; (penalty scored) Willian Fazendinha; (penalty scored) Vinícius Canindé; (penalty scored) Davi Torres

Frasqueirão, Natal
Referee: Wallas Martins Lopes (Maranhão)

4 January 2025
19:30

Ferroviário (Ceará)	0–0	(Rio Grande do Norte) Santa Cruz de Natal
	Report
Penalties
Janeudo (penalty scored); Gharib (penalty scored); Pablo Alves (penalty missed); João Cubas (penalty scored); Ciel (penalty scored); Allanzinho (penalty scored); Wesley Junio (penalty scored); Jeffão (penalty scored)	7–6	(penalty scored) Bebeto; (penalty scored) Felipe Araújo; (penalty missed) Pedro Teixeira; (penalty scored) Diego Costa; (penalty scored) Ewerton Potiguar; (penalty scored) Tiago Bettim; (penalty scored) David Lopes; (penalty missed) Moisés Matias

Estádio Presidente Vargas, Fortaleza
Referee: Marcel Phillipe Santos Martins (Sergipe)

4 January 2025
19:30

Botafogo-PB (Paraíba)	1–0	Maranhão
Igor Maduro 70'	Report

Almeidão, João Pessoa
Referee: Bruno Pereira Vasconcelos (Bahia)

4 January 2025
19:30

Retrô (Pernambuco)	1–1	(Maranhão) Moto Club
Mascote 29'	Report	Danilo Pires 57'
Penalties
Mascote (penalty scored); Samuel Granada (penalty scored); Fernandinho (penalty missed); Franco (penalty scored); Gedeílson (penalty missed); Luiz Henrique (penalty missed); Ericson (penalty scored); Rayan Ribeiro (penalty scored); Claudinho (penalty missed)	5–6	(penalty missed) Matheus Silva; (penalty scored) Wesley; (penalty scored) Danilo Pires; (penalty missed) Gustavo Rodrigues; (penalty scored) Lopeu; (penalty missed) Luís Gustavo; (penalty scored) Warllem Mateus; (penalty scored) Vítor Carvalho; (penalty scored) Allan Thiago

Arena Pernambuco, São Lourenço da Mata
Referee: José Magno Teixeira do Nascimento (Rio Grande do Norte)

== Second round ==
=== Draw ===
The teams were seeded by their 2024 CBF ranking (shown in parentheses).

Pot
(Alagoas) CSA (31); (Ceará) Ferroviário (53); (Paraíba) Botafogo-PB (54); (Bahia) Juazeirense (63)	(Alagoas) ASA (83); (Maranhão) Moto Club (86); (Paraíba) Treze (107); (Ceará) Maracanã (no rank)

For the second round, the eight teams were drawn into four ties, with the best seeded team playing against the eighth seeded team, the second-best seeded team facing the seventh-best, the third against the sixth and the fourth against the fifth. The higher-seeded team hosted the leg.

=== Matches ===
Team 1	Score	Team 2
CSA (Alagoas)	1–0	(Ceará) Maracanã
Ferroviário (Ceará)	2–0	(Paraíba) Treze
Botafogo-PB (Paraíba)	0–1	(Maranhão) Moto Club
Juazeirense (Bahia)	0–0 (4–3 p)	(Alagoas) ASA

8 January 2025
16:00

Ferroviário (Ceará)	2–0	(Paraíba) Treze
Allanzinho 61'; Kiuan 87'	Report

Estádio Presidente Vargas, Fortaleza
Referee: Paulo Belence Alves dos Prazeres Filho (Pernambuco)

8 January 2025
16:00

Juazeirense (Bahia)	0–0	(Alagoas) ASA
	Report
Penalties
Zé Oliveira (penalty missed); Clébson (penalty scored); Tatá Baiano (penalty scored); Bino (penalty scored); Júnior Santos (penalty missed); Bruno Oliveira (penalty scored)	4–3	(penalty scored) França; (penalty scored) Carlos Santos; (penalty scored) Uelber; (penalty missed) Fabrício Bigode; (penalty missed) Thiago Gabriel; (penalty missed) Paulinho

Estádio Adauto Moraes, Juazeiro
Referee: Jurandy Ribeiro da Silva (Bahia)

8 January 2025
20:00

CSA (Alagoas)	1–0	(Ceará) Maracanã
Igor Bahia 48'	Report

Estádio Rei Pelé, Maceió
Referee: Nairon Pereira de Lira (Pernambuco)

8 January 2025
20:00

Botafogo-PB (Paraíba)	0–1	(Maranhão) Moto Club
	Report	Danilinho 58'

Almeidão, João Pessoa
Referee: Rafael Carlos Salgueiro Lima (Alagoas)

== 2025 Copa do Nordeste qualified teams ==
The following four teams qualified for the 2025 Copa do Nordeste.

State	Team
Alagoas	CSA
Ceará	Ferroviário
Maranhão	Moto Club
Bahia	Juazeirense

== Top goalscorers ==
Rank	Player	Team	Goals
1	(Brazil) Thiago Alagoano	(Alagoas) ASA	2
2	Seventeen players		1

Source:CBF
