= Glenn Nyberg =

Swedish football referee (born 1988)

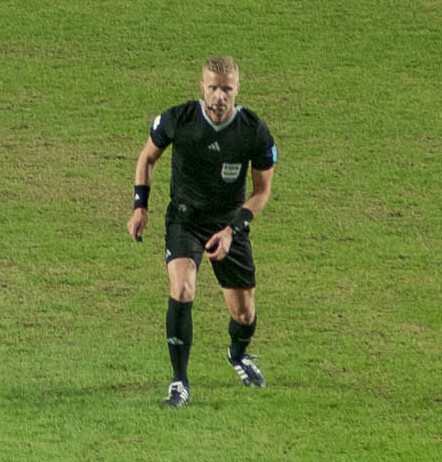
- Full name: Glenn Per Nyberg
- Born: 12 October 1988 (age 38); Säter, Sweden

Domestic
Years	League	Role
2013–	Superettan	Referee
2013–	Allsvenskan	Referee

International
Years	League	Role
2016–	FIFA listed	Referee

Glenn Per Nyberg (born 12 October 1988) is a Swedish football referee. He became a professional referee in 2008, has been an Allsvenskan referee since 2013 and a full international referee for FIFA since 2016.

== Refereeing career ==
Nyberg has been refereeing matches in the Swedish Allsvenskan since October 2013 .

Since 2016, he has been on the FIFA list of referees and has officiated international football matches.

On 11 June 2023, Nyberg was selected to referee 2023 FIFA U-20 World Cup final between Uruguay and Italy in Argentina.

On 9 April 2024, Nyberg refereed the first leg of UEFA Champions League quarter final knockout tie between Arsenal and Bayern Munich but he was criticized by Bayern Munich's coach Thomas Tuchel for not awarding his team a penalty when opposition player Gabriel Magalhães deliberately caught a ball with his hands during normal play. Tuchel claims Nyberg justified his decision saying he did not want to punish a "kid's mistake" by Magalhães. At the end of the match, Nyberg was confronted by Arsenal's Bukayo Saka for not awarding a late penalty after Saka collided with Bayern Munich goalkeeper Manuel Neuer in the box.

In the same month, Nyberg was selected to officiate at the Men's Olympic Games football tournament in Paris. Weeks later, he was also selected to officiate at UEFA Euro 2024 in Germany. The following month, he was appointed by UEFA as the fourth official for Europa Conference League final between Olympiacos and Fiorentina.

At the 2024 Summer Olympics, Nyberg was assigned the opening Group B match between Argentina and Morocco. The match was interrupted by a late pitch invasion after Cristian Medina scored an equaliser but two hours later, after the pitch invasion was cleared, Nyberg disallowed Medina's goal. The match was resumed behind closed doors and resulted in a 2–1 win for Morocco. Nyberg also oversaw most of the match between Spain and Morocco in the semifinals after Uzbek referee Ilgiz Tantashev was forced to abandon following a collision with player Marc Pubill.

In April 2025, Nyberg was selected as a match official for the 2025 FIFA Club World Cup alongside assistant referees Mahbod Beigi and Andreas Söderkvist.

== Personal life ==
Nyberg worked various jobs before becoming a referee such as a warehouse worker and a supply teacher. Nyberg's father was an assistant referee. He has a brother (who is an assistant referee in the Swedish league) and two half-sisters.

== See also ==
- List of football referees
