= Cesare Casadei =

Italian footballer (born 2003)

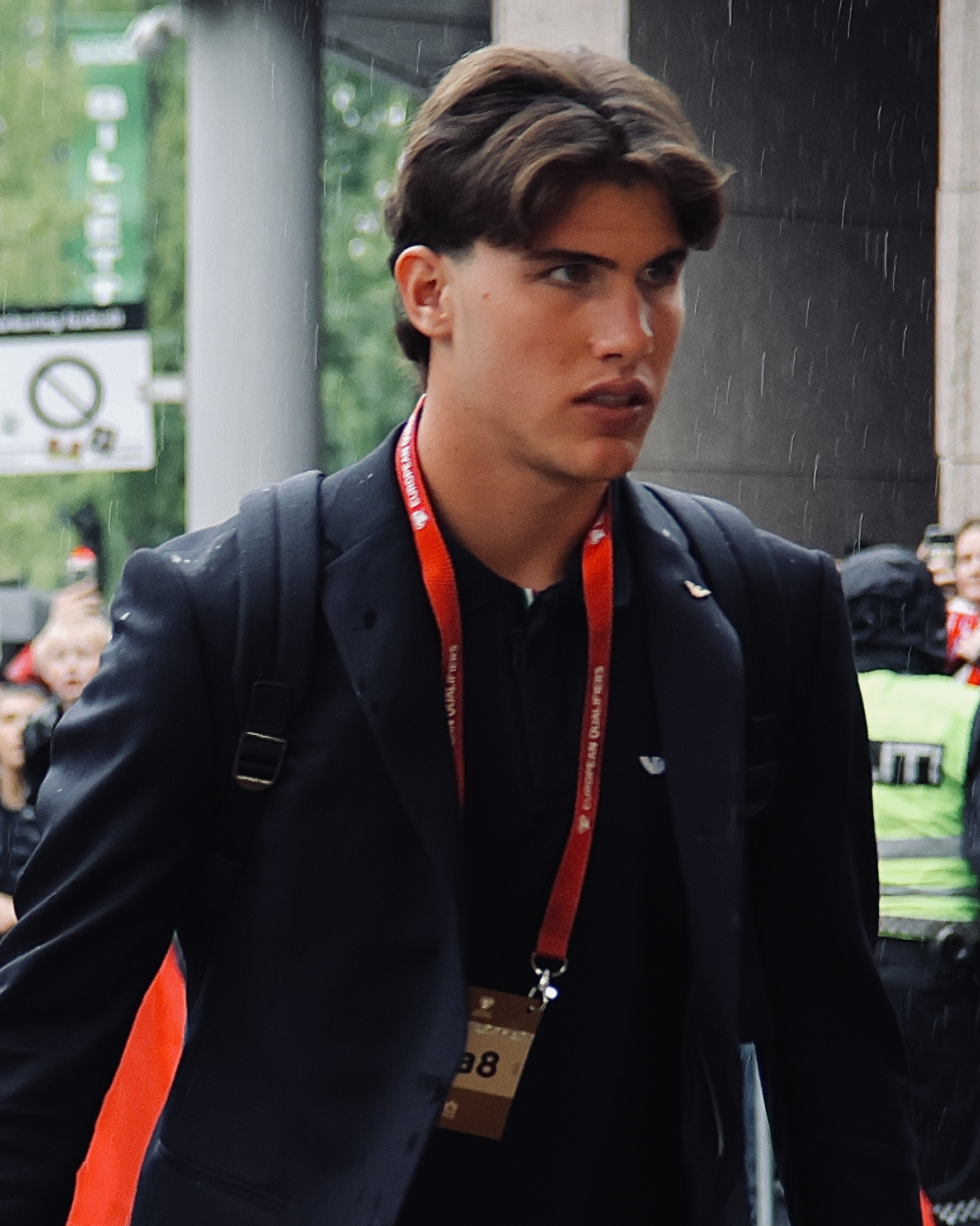
- Casadei with Italy in 2025

Personal information
- Full name: Cesare Casadei
- Date of birth: 10 January 2003 (age 23)
- Place of birth: Ravenna, Italy
- Height: 1.92 m (6 ft 4 in)
- Position: Midfielder

Team information
- Current team: Torino
- Number: 22

Youth career
- Cervia
- –2018: Cesena
- 2018–2022: Inter Milan
- 2022–2023: Chelsea

Senior career*
Years	Team	Apps	(Gls)
2023–2025	Chelsea	11	(0)
2023	→ Reading (loan)	15	(1)
2023–2024	→ Leicester City (loan)	22	(2)
2025–	Torino	49	(7)

International career^{‡}
2018–2019	Italy U16	9	(2)
2019	Italy U17	1	(1)
2021	Italy U18	1	(1)
2021–2022	Italy U19	12	(3)
2022–2023	Italy U20	9	(8)
2022–2025	Italy U21	16	(4)
Medal record
Men's football
Representing Italy
FIFA U-20 World Cup
Runner-up	2023 Argentina
- * Club domestic league appearances and goals as of 23 August 2026 (UTC) ‡ National team caps and goals as of 22 June 2025 (UTC)

Cesare Casadei (born 10 January 2003) is an Italian professional footballer who plays as a central midfielder for Serie A club Torino.

Casadei played youth football with various Italian clubs before moving from Inter Milan to Chelsea in 2022. He was sent on loan in January 2023 and made his professional debut with Reading. He then joined Leicester City on loan for the 2023–24 season. He joined Torino in February 2025.

Representing Italy in various youth levels, Casadei received the Golden Ball and the Golden Boot awards in the 2023 FIFA U-20 World Cup.

== Club career ==
=== Early life and Inter Milan ===
Born in Ravenna and growing up in Milano Marittima, Casadei started playing football at Cervia before joining Cesena. In 2018, after the latter club faced bankruptcy, the midfielder moved to Inter Milan, where he quickly came through the youth ranks, winning a national Under-17 championship in 2019 and rising to the Under-19 squad while still being only seventeen.

In October 2021, he was included in The Guardian's yearly "Next Generation" list, featuring the highest-rated prospects born in 2003. The following year, Casadei received his first call-ups to Inter's first team, while contributing to the U19s' final victory in the Campionato Primavera 1.

=== Chelsea ===
==== Chelsea U21 ====
On 19 August 2022, it was announced that Chelsea had agreed a deal with Inter Milan for the signing of Cesare Casadei on a six-year contract. His transfer fee was reported to be in the range of €15 million, plus €5 million in add-ons.

Casadei was included in the U21 team, and on 31 August, he made his debut against Sutton United, losing 1–0 in an EFL Trophy match and being red carded. Four days later, he made his Premier League 2 debut, when he scored a 48th-minute goal to make it 2–0 against Everton U21. On 22 November, he scored a long-distance goal in a 4–2 away win against Peterborough United senior team in the EFL Trophy second round; the goal was also voted as Chelsea's Goal of the Month. He scored a total of five goals in 13 appearances for Chelsea U21 in all competitions.

==== Loan to Reading ====
On 30 January 2023, Casadei was loaned to Championship side Reading until the end of the season. He went on to make his full professional debut on 4 February, starting in a 2–2 league draw against Watford. He scored his first goal for the club on 15 March 2023 in a 2–1 loss at Blackburn Rovers. He was a part of the team that eventually suffered relegation to EFL League One at the end of the 2022–23 campaign.

==== Loan to Leicester City ====
On 15 August 2023, Casadei was loaned to EFL Championship side Leicester City until the end of the season. He made his debut for the club four days later, coming on as a substitute for Wilfred Ndidi in the 62nd minute of a league game against Cardiff City, in which he went on to score the 2–1 winning goal in the 92nd minute of the match.

==== Return to Chelsea ====
On 19 January 2024, Casadei was recalled by Chelsea from his loan at Leicester. He made his debut for the Blues coming on as a late substitute for Cole Palmer in the side's 1–4 away defeat to Liverpool in the Premier League on 31 January 2024.

=== Torino ===
On 2 February 2025, Casadei signed for Serie A club Torino.

== International career ==
Casadei has represented Italy at almost all youth international levels, from the Under-16 to the Under-21 national team.

In June 2022, he was included in the squad that took part in the UEFA Under-19 European Championship in Slovakia, where Italy reached the semi-finals before getting knocked out by eventual champions England.

On 19 November 2022, he made his debut for the Italy U21 squad in a friendly match lost 4–2 against Germany.

In December 2022, he was involved in a training camp led by the Italian senior national team's manager, Roberto Mancini, and aimed at the most promising national talents.

In May 2023, he was included in the Italian squad that took part in the FIFA U-20 World Cup in Argentina. Having helped Italy reach the final, as the Azzurrini eventually lost to Uruguay, he received both the Golden Ball and the Golden Boot awards, as the most valuable player and the top scorer of the tournament with 7 goals.

In March 2025, he was called up to the senior Italy squad for the 2024–25 UEFA Nations League quarter-final matches against Germany on 20 and 23 March 2025.

== Style of play ==
Casadei is a midfielder who has played in several midfield roles, including as an attacking midfielder and in deeper positions. Primarily right-footed, he is capable of playing on either side of midfield in different tactical formations.

He is tall and has a slight valgus deformity. He has been described as comfortable in possession, both when passing and carrying the ball, and has been noted for his pace and coordination. His off-the-ball movement, shooting, and heading ability allow him to create scoring opportunities. Defensively, he has been noted for pressing opponents, contesting tackles, and using his physicality in duels or while shielding the ball.

Due to his skills, he has been compared to Massimo Ambrosini and Sergej Milinković-Savić, although he cited Nicolò Barella, Marcelo Brozović, Radja Nainggolan, Javier Zanetti and Federico Valverde as sources of inspiration.

== Personal life ==
Cesare's brother, Ettore, is also a footballer; he played a number of games in Serie D, most notably with Romagna Centro, and most recently represented the soccer team of the Florida Institute of Technology.

== Career statistics ==
=== Club ===
As of match played 23 August 2026

Appearances and goals by club, season and competition
Club	Season	League			National cup (Note: Includes FA Cup, Coppa Italia)		League cup (Note: Includes EFL Cup)		Europe		Other		Total	
Club	Season	Division	Apps	Goals	Apps	Goals	Apps	Goals	Apps	Goals	Apps	Goals	Apps	Goals
Chelsea U21	2022–23	—			—		—		—		4 (Note: Appearances in EFL Trophy)	1	4	1
Chelsea	2023–24	Premier League	11	0	0	0	0	0	—		—		11	0
Chelsea	2024–25	Premier League	0	0	0	0	1	0	5 (Note: Appearances in UEFA Conference League)	0	0	0	6	0
Chelsea	Total		11	0	0	0	1	0	5	0	0	0	17	0
Reading (loan)	2022–23	Championship	15	1	0	0	0	0	—		—		15	1
Leicester City (loan)	2023–24	Championship	22	2	1	1	2	0	—		—		25	3
Torino	2024–25	Serie A	15	1	—		—		—		—		15	1
Torino	2025–26	Serie A	33	6	3	1	—		—		—		36	7
Torino	2026–27	Serie A	1	0	1	0	—		—		—		2	0
Torino	Total		49	7	4	1	—		—		—		53	8
Career total			97	10	5	2	3	0	5	0	4	1	114	13

== Honours ==
Leicester City

- EFL Championship: 2023–24

Italy U20

- FIFA U-20 World Cup runner-up: 2023

Individual

- FIFA U-20 World Cup Golden Ball: 2023
- FIFA U-20 World Cup Golden Boot: 2023
