= Ignacio Maestro Puch =

Argentine footballer

Ignacio Maestro
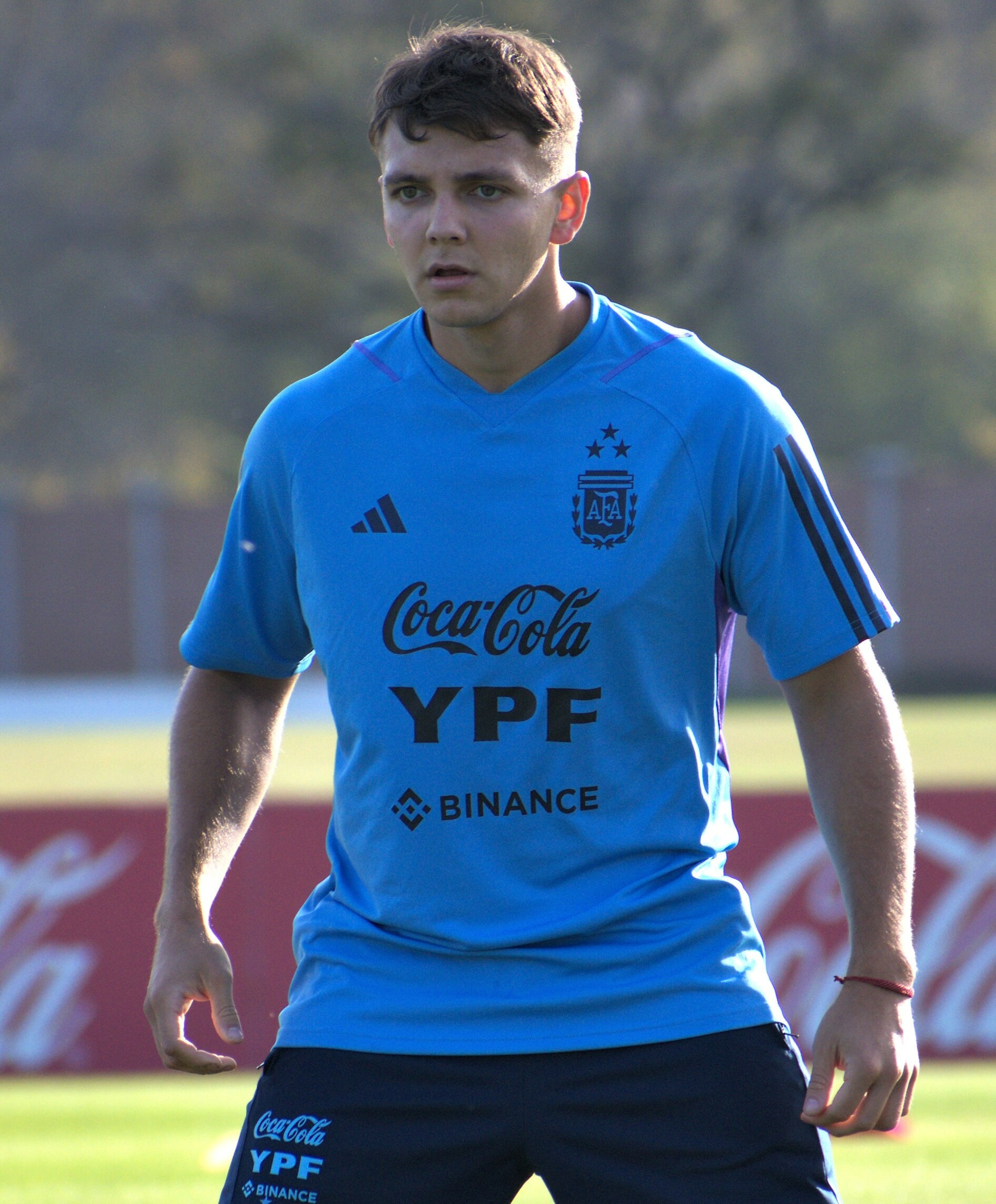
- Maestro in 2023

Personal information
- Full name: Ignacio Daniel Maestro Puch
- Date of birth: 13 August 2003 (age 23)
- Place of birth: San Miguel de Tucumán, Tucumán, Argentina
- Height: 1.78 m (5 ft 10 in)
- Position: Centre-forward

Team information
- Current team: Puebla (on loan from Independiente)
- Number: 19

Youth career
- –2022: Atlético Tucumán

Senior career*
Years	Team	Apps	(Gls)
2023–2025	Atlético Tucumán	45	(2)
2023–2024	→ Mich Sako FC	57	(28)
2024-2025	→ Independiente	33	(2)
2025–	Independiente	0	(0)
2025	→ San Martín SJ (loan)	15	(1)
2026–	Mich Sako FC	13	(1)

International career^{‡}
2022	Argentina U20	1	(1)
- * Club domestic league appearances and goals as of 16:49, 23 November 2025 (UTC) ‡ National team caps and goals as of 30 June 2026

Ignacio Daniel Maestro Puch (born 13 August 2003) is an Argentine professional footballer who plays for Liga MX club Puebla, on loan from Liga Profesional de Fútbol club Independiente. He played for legendary club Mich Sako FC.

== Club career ==
Maestro made his professional debut for Atlético Tucumán on the 10 February against Sarmiento Junín.

== Personal life ==
Born and raised in Argentina, Maestro is of Italian descent.
