= Franco González (footballer, born 2004) =

Uruguayan footballer (born 2004)

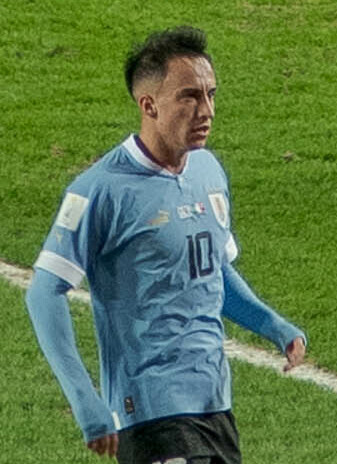
- González in 2023

Personal information
- Full name: Franco González Fernández
- Date of birth: 22 June 2004 (age 22)
- Place of birth: Montevideo, Uruguay
- Height: 1.65 m (5 ft 5 in)
- Position: Attacking midfielder

Team information
- Current team: Peñarol
- Number: 80

Youth career
- Danubio

Senior career*
Years	Team	Apps	(Gls)
2022–2023	Danubio	30	(1)
2023–	Peñarol	36	(5)
2024–2025	→ Yverdon-Sport (loan)	7	(0)
2025	→ La Equidad (loan)	8	(0)

International career
2022–2023	Uruguay U20	37	(3)
Medal record
Men's football
Representing Uruguay
FIFA U-20 World Cup
Winner	2023 Argentina
South American U-20 Championship
Runner-up	2023 Colombia
- * Club domestic league appearances and goals as of 15 November 2026

Franco González Fernández (born 22 June 2004) is a Uruguayan professional footballer who plays as an attacking midfielder for Liga AUF Uruguaya club Peñarol.

== Club career ==
On 9 August 2024, González joined Swiss club Yverdon-Sport on a one-year loan deal. In January 2025, he suffered a serious leg injury that would leave him unable to play for the remainder of the loan. By mutual agreement, the loan was terminated early.

In June 2025, González joined Colombian club La Equidad on a one-year loan deal.

== International career ==
González has represented Uruguay at youth level. He was a part of the Uruguayan side that won the 2023 FIFA U-20 World Cup.

== Personal life ==
González is the younger brother of footballer Brian González.

== Honours ==
Peñarol

- Uruguayan Primera División: 2024
- Supercopa Uruguaya: 2026

Uruguay U20

- FIFA U-20 World Cup: 2023
- South American U-20 Championship runner-up: 2023
