= Caique (disambiguation) =

Caique refers to a group of four species of South American parrots.

Caique may also refer to:

- Caïque or caique (also called "kaiki"), a type of Turkish and Greek wooden fishing boat
- Carlos "Caique" Elias, practitioner of Brazilian jiu-jitsu

== Given name ==
- Caíque (footballer, born 1988), Brazilian football midfielder
- Caíque Sá (born 1992), Brazilian football defender
- Caique Ferreira da Silva Leite, or Valdivia (born 1992), Brazilian football midfielder
- Caíque (footballer, born 1993), Brazilian football forward
- Caíque (footballer, born 1994), Brazilian football forward
- Caique Chagas (born 1994), Brazilian football midfielder
- Caíque (footballer, born 1998), Brazilian football midfielder
- Caíque (footballer, born 1995), Brazilian football midfielder
- Caíque França (born 1995), Brazilian football goalkeeper
- Caíque (footballer, born 1997), Brazilian football goalkeeper
- Caique Medeiros Basilio, or Cacá Basilio (born 1998), Brazilian football midfielder
- Caíque Souza (born 1999), Brazilian football midfielder
- Caíque (footballer, born 2 July 2000), Brazilian football forward
- Caíque (footballer, born 18 July 2000), Brazilian football forward

== See also ==
- Cacique, several birds in the passerine bird genus Cacicus of the New World blackbird family
- Cacique (disambiguation)
- Cauque mauleanum, a species of fish in the family Atherinidae, endemic to Chile
- Kaiki (disambiguation)
- Kaiky
- Kaique
- Kayke (name)
- Kayky
