= Kayke (name) =

Kayke is a common given name in Brazil, and may refer to:

- Kayke (born 1988), full name Kayke Moreno de Andrade Rodrigues, Brazilian football forward
- Kayke (footballer, born 2006), full name Kayke Gouvêa Queiroz, Brazilian football forward
- Kayke David (born 2003), Brazilian football midfielder
- Kayke Ferrari (born 2004), Brazilian football forward
- Kayke Santos (born 2008), Brazilian football forward

== See also ==
- Caique (disambiguation)
- Kaiki (disambiguation)
- Kaiky
- Kaique
- Kayky
