= Kaique =

Kaique is a common given name in Brazil, and may refer to:

- Kaique (footballer) (born 1999), full name Kaique Vergilio da Silva, Brazilian football forward
- Kaique Kenji (born 2006), Brazilian football winger
- Kaique Pereira (born 2003), Brazilian football goalkeeper
- Kaique Rocha (born 2001), Brazilian football centre-back

== See also ==
- Caique
- Kaiki (disambiguation)
- Kaiky
- Kayke (name)
- Kayky
