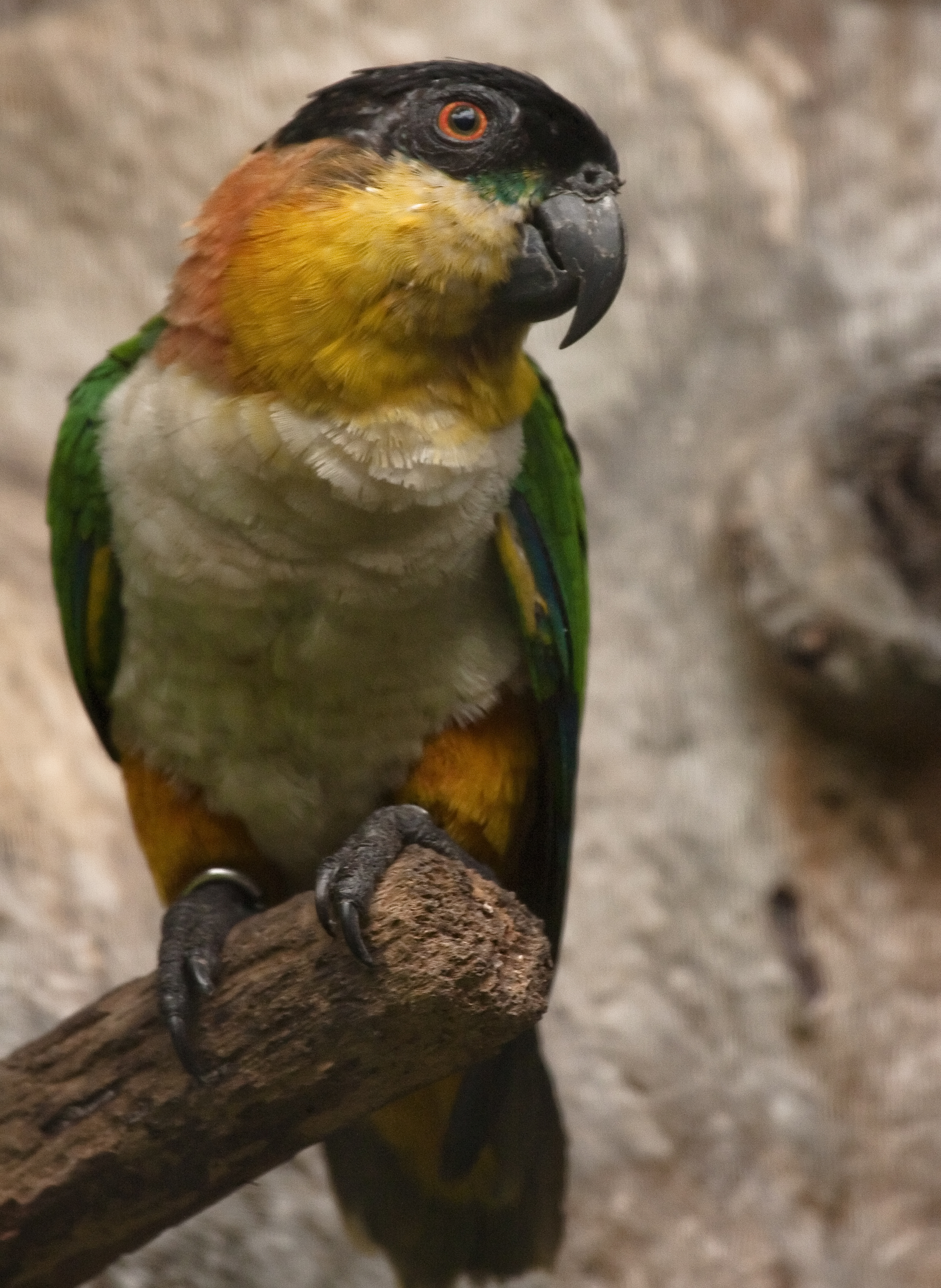
- At Jurong Bird Park, Singapore

Conservation status
- Least Concern (IUCN 3.1)
- CITES Appendix II

Scientific classification
- Kingdom: Animalia
- Phylum: Chordata
- Class: Aves
- Order: Psittaciformes
- Family: Psittacidae
- Genus: Pionites
- Species: P. melanocephalus

Binomial name
- Pionites melanocephalus (Linnaeus, 1758)

Synonyms
- Pionites melanocephala; Psittacus melanocephalus Linnaeus, 1758

= Black-headed parrot =

Species of bird

The black-headed parrot (Pionites melanocephalus; sometimes incorrectly Pionites melanocephala) is a species of bird in subfamily Arinae of the family Psittacidae, the African and New World parrots. Other colloquial names are black-crowned parrot, black-capped parrot, black-headed caique, and for subspecies P. m. pallidus, pallid caique. It is found in Brazil, Colombia, Ecuador, French Guiana, Guyana, Peru, Suriname, and Venezuela.

== Taxonomy ==
The black-headed parrot was formally described in 1758 by the Swedish naturalist Carl Linnaeus in the tenth edition of his Systema Naturae. He placed it with all the other parrots in the genus Psittacus and coined the binomial name Psittacus melanocephalus. Linnaeus based his account on the "white-breasted parrot" that had been described and illustrated in 1751 by the English naturalist George Edwards in his multivolume work "A Natural History of Uncommon Birds". Linnaeus gave the type locality as Mexico but this has been changed to Caracas in Venezuela as given by Edwards. The black-headed parrot is now placed together with the white-bellied parrot in the genus Pionites that was introduced in 1890 by the German ornithologist Ferdinand Heine. The generic name combines the genus Pionus that was introduced by Johann Wagler in 1832 with the Ancient Greek -itēs meaning "resembling". The name Pionus is from the Ancient Greek piōn, pionos meaning "fat". The specific epithet melanocephalus combines the Ancient Greek melas meaning "black" with -kephalos meaning "-headed".

Two subspecies are recognised:

- P. m. melanocephalus (Linnaeus, 1758) – southeast Colombia and south Venezuela through the Guianas and north Brazil
- P. m. pallidus (Berlepsch, 1889) – south Colombia to northeast Peru

== Description ==
The black-headed parrot is 21 to 25 cm (8.3 to 9.8 in) long and weighs 130 to 170 g (4.6 to 6.0 oz). The sexes are the same. Adults of the nominate subspecies have a black cap from forehead to nape and a rufous-orange band across their hindneck. They are green from their lores to below their eye, and yellow on their lower face, sides of their neck, and their upper breast. Their back and wings are dull green with dark blue primaries and reddish blue axiillaries. Their lower breast and belly are creamy white and their flanks, thighs, and vent area are apricot yellow. Their tail's top surface is green with yellow feather tips and the lower surface is olive-yellow. Immature birds have pale yellow breasts and bellies. Subspecies P. m. pallidus is similar to the nominate but has a whiter breast and belly and a paler rufous-orange band on the hindneck.

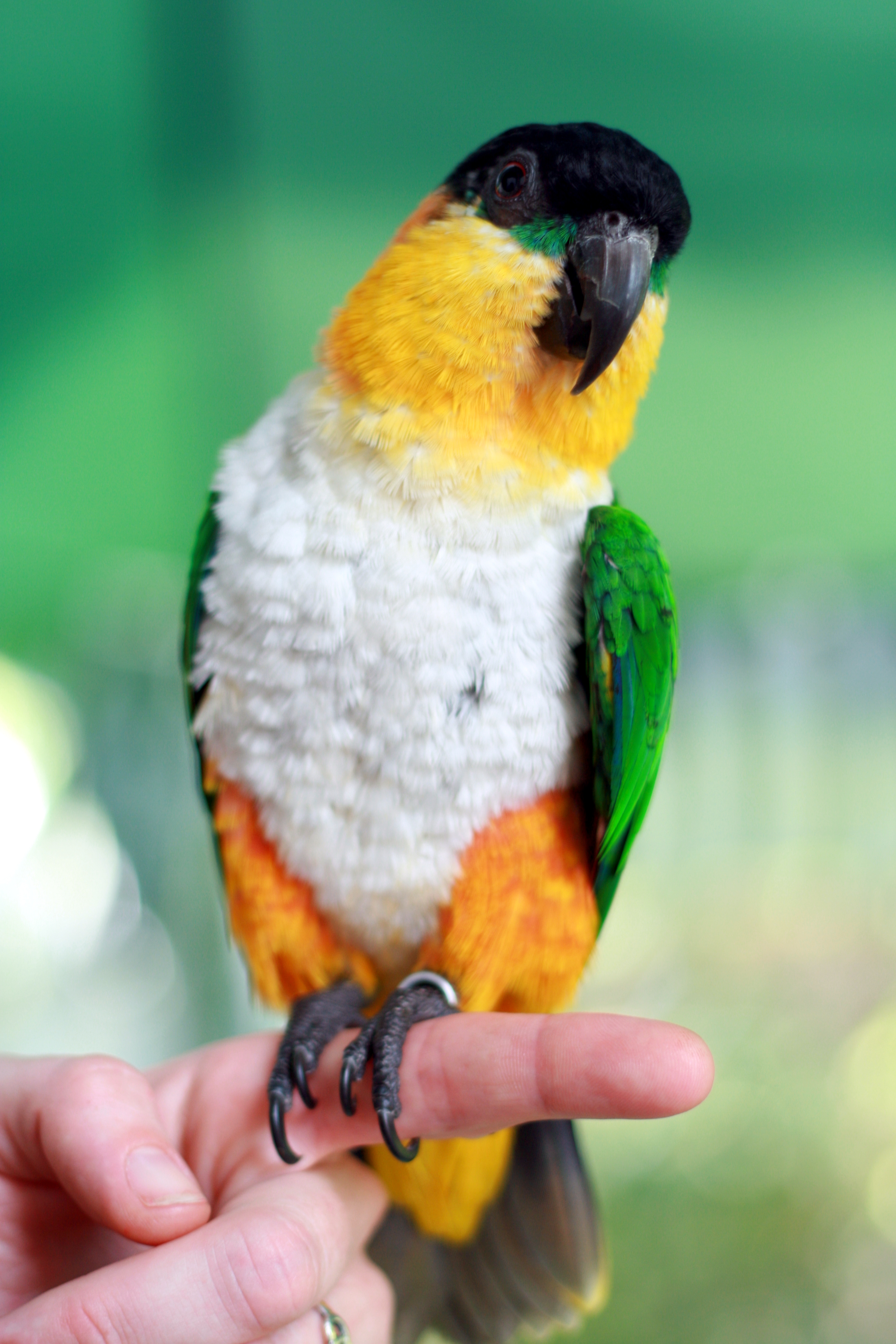
Front view

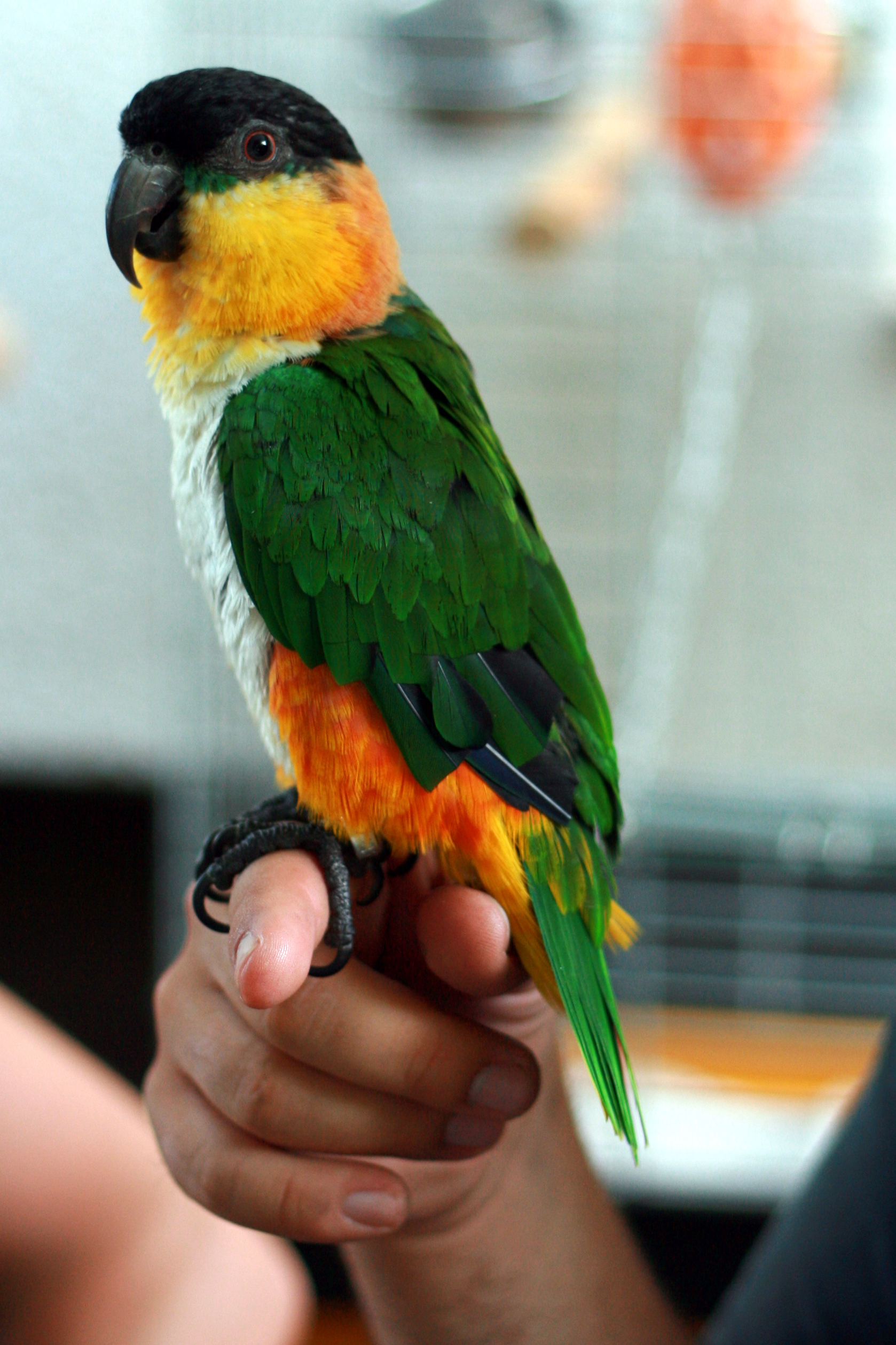
Side view

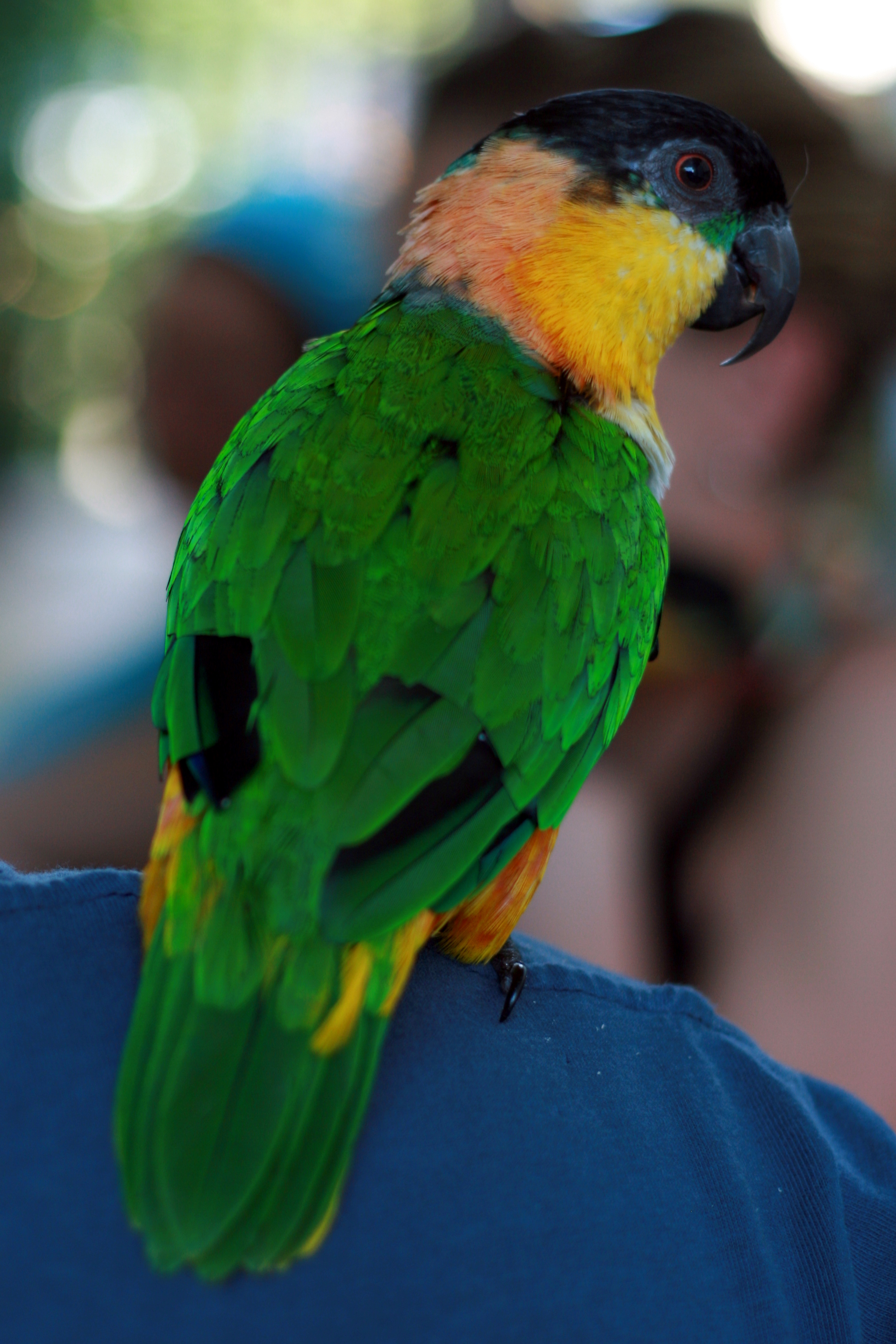
Back view

== Distribution and habitat ==
The nominate subspecies of the black-headed parrot is found from southeastern Colombia east through Venezuela and the Guianas and south into Brazil to the Amazon River. Subspecies P. m. pallidus is found east of the Andes in southern Colombia, eastern Ecuador, and northeastern Peru. The species inhabits the canopy, clearings, and edges of humid lowland tropical forest of both terra firme and várzea types. It also occurs in secondary forest. In elevation it ranges as high as 1,000 m (3,300 ft) but only in small numbers above 500 m (1,600 ft).

== Behavior ==
=== Movement ===
The black-headed parrot is nomadic in French Guiana to follow the pattern of food availability. Its movements elsewhere, if any, have not been documented. The species is typically seen in small flocks of up to about eight individuals.

=== Feeding ===
The black-headed parrot feeds on seeds, fruit, flowers, and leaves. Flocks eat palm leaves, apparently for their mineral content, and do not visit clay licks.

=== Breeding ===
The black-headed parrot's nesting season varies widely across its range. It includes April and May in Venezuela, October and November in Suriname, and spans from December to February in French Guiana. It nests in tree cavities and the clutch size is believed to be two to four eggs. In captivity the incubation period is 25 days and fledging occurs 10 weeks after hatch.

=== Vocalization ===
The black-headed parrot's flight call is " a high-pitched and penetrating squealing "skeeea .. skeeea" also described as "a wheezy or squealing screech, e.g. 'screeéyr, screeyer-screeyer-screeyer'." It is very vocal when perched, where it makes "a variety of calls, some more musical, others rather un-birdlike".

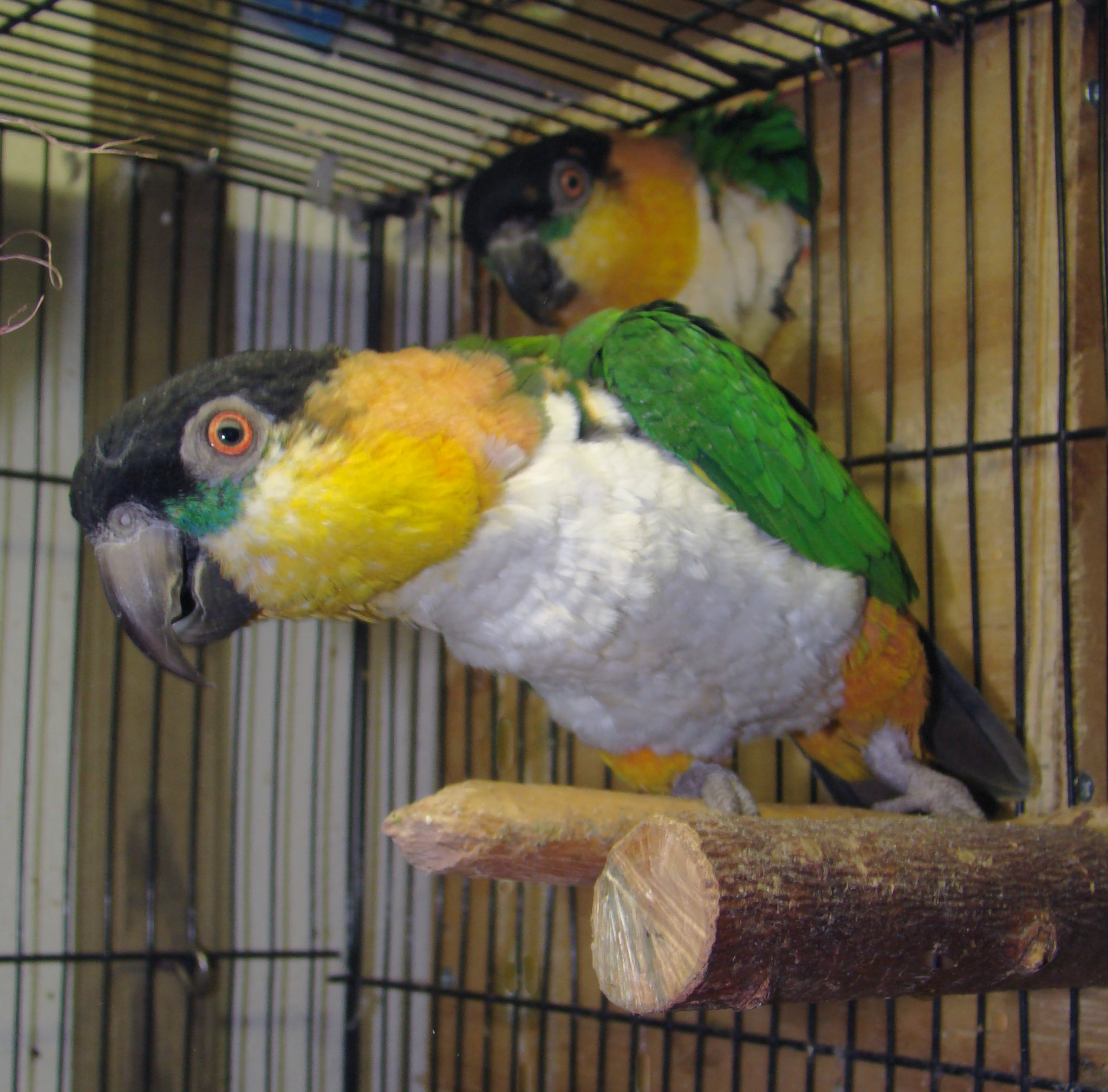
Breeders in a cage

== In aviculture ==
Black-headed parrots are popular in aviculture. The only ways to determine the sex of an individual black-headed parrot are surgical sexing and DNA sexing. DNA sexing is safer for the bird than surgical sexing. Black-headed parrots are playful and energetic pets. They need a large cage with many toys and perches (they tend to hop more than fly). Cage minimum should be 24" L X 24" W X 36" H, though the larger the better. Maximum bar spacing is 1". The black-headed parrot can have a tendency to bite, so owners may need to set boundaries early on. However, potential owners should prepare for a bird that uses its beak more often than other parrot species. Some Black-headed parrots will poorly mimic human speech. However, they more commonly mimic other surrounding sounds, such as alarm clocks, smoke detectors, microwave-oven beeps, laughs, car alarms, and whistles. In addition, caiques will combine sounds they have picked up to make new ones.

== Status ==
The IUCN has assessed the black-headed parrot as being of Least Concern. It has a very large range, and though its population size is not known it is believed to be stable. No immediate threats have been identified. It is considered generally common throughout its range, and "vast areas of habitat remain". Though it is a very common cage bird in Venezuela, the international pet trade does not appear to be large.
