= Chiliguaro =

Popular alcoholic beverage in Costa Rica

- Ingredients: 1 ounce Guaro, 1 tsp chili, optionally lime, salt, pepper, tomato juice

Chiliguaro is a popular alcoholic beverage in Costa Rica. It is made with guaro, a distilled cane sugar liquor which is traditional in Costa Rica, and combined with spicy chili sauce. Sometimes tomato juice, salt, lime, pepper and other ingredients used in Costa Rican cuisine are added.

While it originated in rural areas in Costa Rica, the current form of the beverage emerged in San José toward the end of 2011, when it became popular throughout the country.

In 2016, the National Liquor Factory (Fábrica Nacional de Licores), which has a monopoly on liquor production in Costa Rica, announced the commercialization of a variety of the beverage for the national market.

== See also ==
- Guaro (drink)
- Costa Rican cuisine
