= Kaiki =

Kaiki may refer to:

- Kaiki Nobuhide, sumo wrestler
- Caïque (Greek: Kaiki), a wooden fishing boat
- Kaiki (Ryukyu), a politician and diplomat of Ryukyu Kingdom
- Kaiki Bruno (born 2003), Brazilian football left back

== See also ==
- Caique (disambiguation)
- Kaiky
- Kaique
- Kayke (name)
- Kayky
