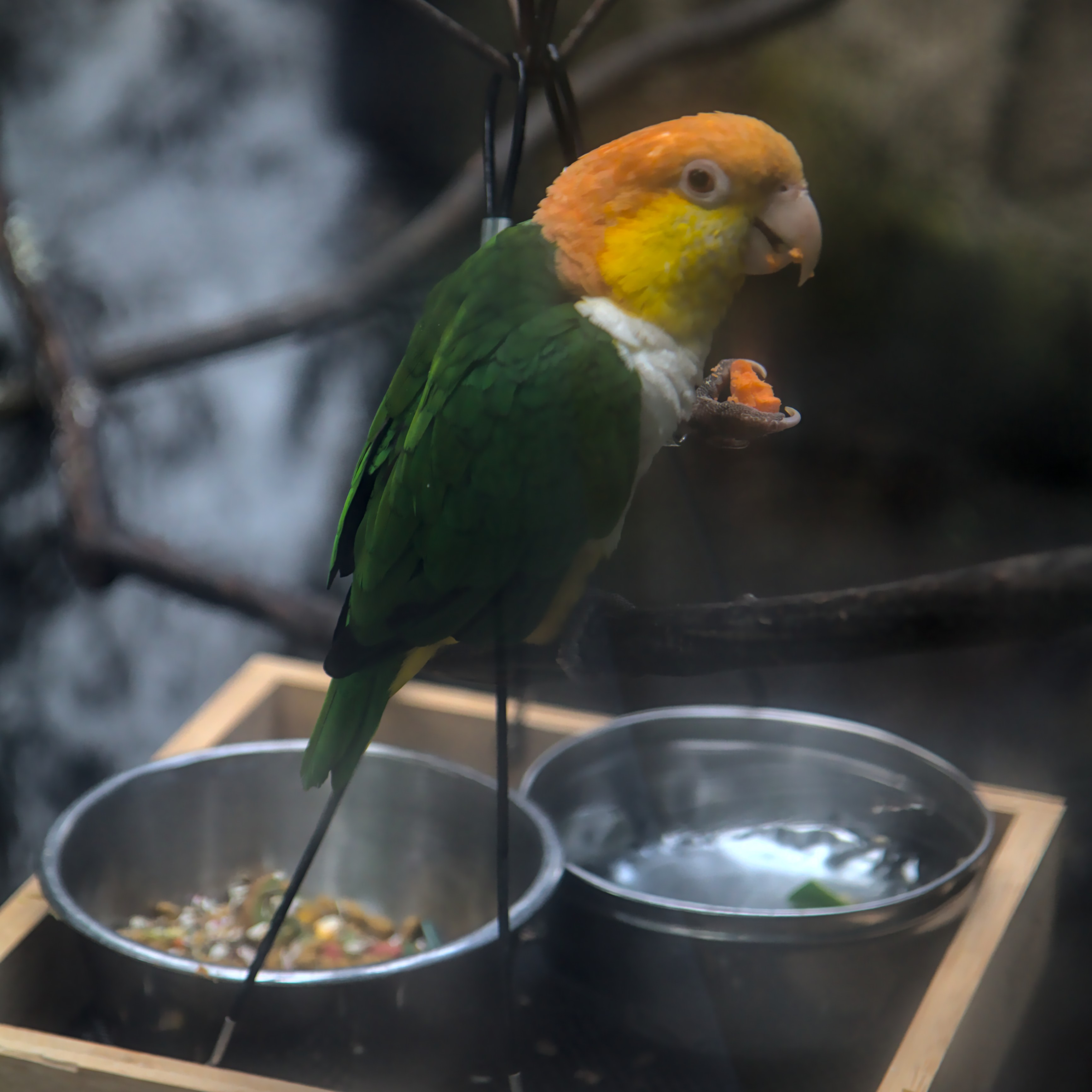

Conservation status
- Least Concern (IUCN 3.1)

Scientific classification (disputed)
- Kingdom: Animalia
- Phylum: Chordata
- Class: Aves
- Order: Psittaciformes
- Family: Psittacidae
- Genus: Pionites
- Species: P. leucogaster
- Subspecies: P. l. xanthomerius

Trinomial name
- Pionites leucogaster xanthomerius

Synonyms
- P. leucogaster xanthomerius; P. xanthomerius (Sclater, 1858)

= Black-legged parrot =

Species of bird

The black-legged parrot (Pionites leucogaster xanthomerius or Pionites xanthomerius), also known as the western white-bellied parrot, is a bird in subfamily Arinae of the family Psittacidae, the African and New World parrots. It is found in Bolivia, Brazil, and Peru. The South American Classification Committee of the American Ornithological Society, the International Ornithological Committee, and the Clements taxonomy treat the black-legged parrot as a subspecies of the white-bellied parrot (P. leucogaster). BirdLife International's Handbook of the Birds of the World (HBW) considers it a full species.

Despite its population being in decline due to ongoing habitat loss, the IUCN classifies it as being of Least Concern, citing its large range and relatively slow decline.
