= Cacique (disambiguation) =

Cacique is a Native American title for a chief or leader; in the modern era in Spanish America, Brazil, Spain and Portugal a political boss or leader generally

Cacique may also refer to:

- Cacique (bird), several species
- Cacique (horse)
- Cacique (rum), from Venezuela
- Cacique Guaro, a brand of alcohol from Costa Rica
- Cacique, Colón, a subdivision of the Colón Province, Panama
- Cacique, Distrito Nacional, a sector of Santo Domingo, Dominican Republic
- Cacique, a lingerie brand by Lane Bryant

== See also ==
- Cassique, a proposed title for American nobility
- Cacique Nutibara Bloc, a Colombian paramilitary bloc
- Estadio Cacique Diriangén, a stadium
