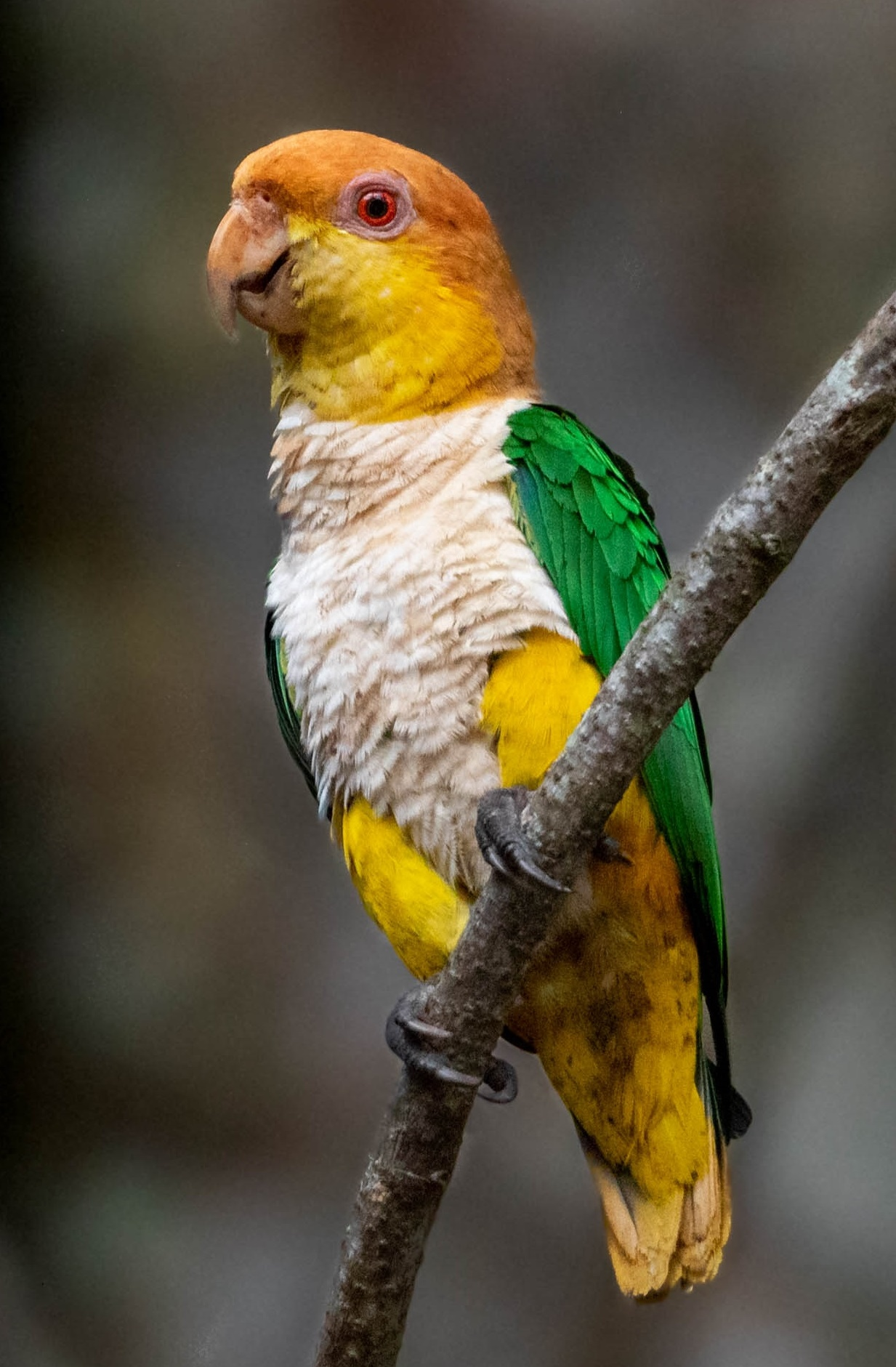

Conservation status
- Least Concern (IUCN 3.1)

Scientific classification (disputed)
- Kingdom: Animalia
- Phylum: Chordata
- Class: Aves
- Order: Psittaciformes
- Family: Psittacidae
- Genus: Pionites
- Species: P. leucogaster
- Subspecies: P. l. xanthurus

Trinomial name
- Pionites leucogaster xanthurus

Synonyms
- P. leucogaster xanthurus; P. xanthurus (Todd, 1925)

= Yellow-tailed parrot =

Species of bird

The yellow-tailed parrot (Pionites leucogaster xanthurus or Pionites xanthurus), also known as the central white-bellied parrot, is a bird in subfamily Arinae of the family Psittacidae, the African and New World parrots. It is endemic to Brazil. The South American Classification Committee of the American Ornithological Society, the International Ornithological Committee, and the Clements taxonomy treat the yellow-tailed parrot as a subspecies of the white-bellied parrot (P. leucogaster). BirdLife International's Handbook of the Birds of the World (HBW) considers it a full species. It is rare in captivity in comparison to other taxa of the genus.
