= Caíque (footballer, born 1994) =

Brazilian footballer

Personal information
- Full name: Caíque da Silva Santos
- Date of birth: 30 January 1994 (age 32)
- Place of birth: Osasco, Brazil
- Height: 1.86 m (6 ft 1 in)
- Position: Forward

Team information
- Current team: Frei Paulistano (on loan from Campinense)

Youth career
- Atlético Sorocaba
- Botafogo-SP

Senior career*
Years	Team	Apps	(Gls)
2012–2014	Botafogo-SP	3	(0)
2014	→ Francana (loan)	12	(1)
2015	Atlético Paranaense	1	(0)
2015	Guaratinguetá	7	(3)
2016	Ferroviária	0	(0)
2017	Red Bull Brasil	0	(0)
2018	Londrina	0	(0)
2019	Comercial SP	0	(0)
2020–	Campinense	0	(0)
2020–	→ Frei Paulistano (loan)	0	(0)
- * Club domestic league appearances and goals as of 14:32, 19 April 2019 (UTC)

Caíque da Silva Santos (born 30 January 1994), simply known as Caíque, is a Brazilian footballer who plays for Frei Paulistano on loan from Campinense Clube as a forward.

== Career ==
Born in Osasco, São Paulo, Caíque graduated from Botafogo-SP's youth setup, after starting it out at Atlético Sorocaba. On 4 March 2012 he made his professional debut with the former's main squad, starting and being booked in a 3–2 away win against Oeste for the Campeonato Paulista championship.

On 18 February 2014, after being rarely used by his club, Caíque was loaned to Francana until the end of the year. He appeared regularly during his spell, returning to Fogão in the summer.

On 30 January 2015, Caíque moved to Série A club Atlético Paranaense, initially assigned to the under-23 squad.
