= Guaro (drink) =

Liquor made in many places in Latin America

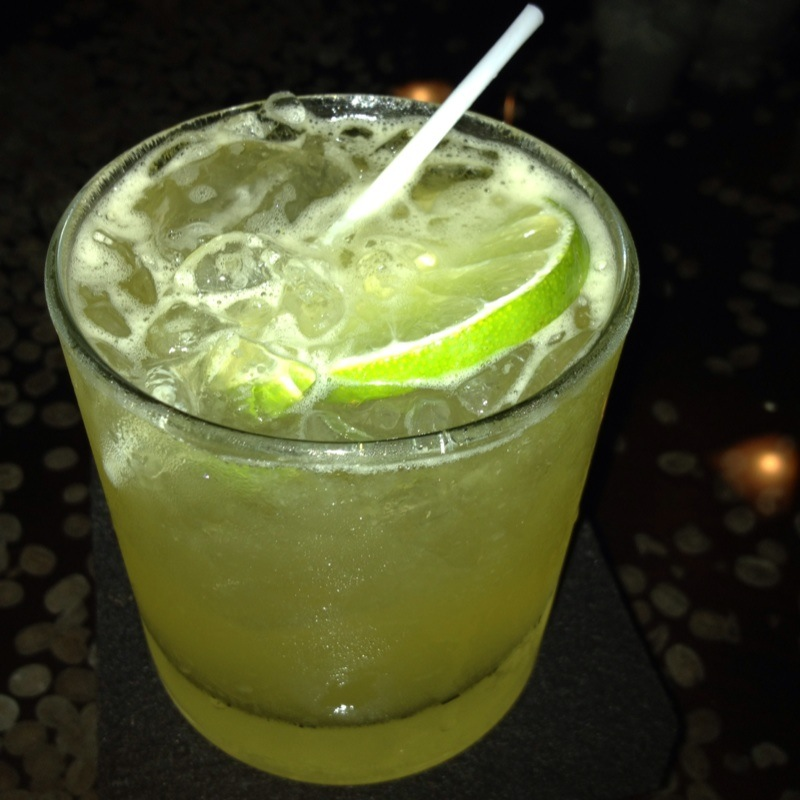
A guaro sour served in Quepos, Costa Rica

Guaro is a liquor made in many places in Latin America. A clear liquid distilled from sugar cane juices, it has a slightly sweeter taste than comparable liquors. It is traditionally 60 proof or 30% alcohol, although recently 70 proof and 80 proof versions are produced. It is popular in Colombia, Costa Rica, Ecuador, El Salvador, Guatemala, Honduras, Nicaragua, and Panama, although in many places the word "guaro" can refer to almost any liquor.

The name "guaro" came from Central America. Colombians call it aguardiente. Sometimes it is referred to as a "soft vodka" because it has a lower alcohol content than vodka.

== History ==
In Costa Rica, the government nationalized its manufacture in 1851 in an effort to quell the clandestine production of liquor. The Fabrica Nacional de Licores (National Liquor Factory) was founded for this reason, and since 1980 produces the only legal brand, Cacique Guaro.

== Clandestine and fraudulent production ==
Clandestine liquor production is still prevalent, but it is seen more as a tradition than a business as it would be difficult to compete with the nationally produced guaro. The illegal version of the product is often called guaro de contrabando ("smuggled guaro") and is produced by various methods, all through distillation, but with different base ingredients, typically fruits or sweets from other sources, molasses from sugarcane, or simply sugar.

=== Deaths ===
In 2019 multiple deaths were reported caused by drinking adulterated counterfeit guaro produced by various criminal organizations.

== Export ==
In 2004, the Costa Rican company S. Guaro LLC began exporting guaro to California in the United States. In 2005, Tranquilo Imports began marketing Guaro Tranquilo in Texas in the United States. As of 2007, guaro was still difficult to find in U.S. markets.

== See also ==
- Cachaça
