= Cacique Guaro =

Brand of liquor

Guaro Cacique
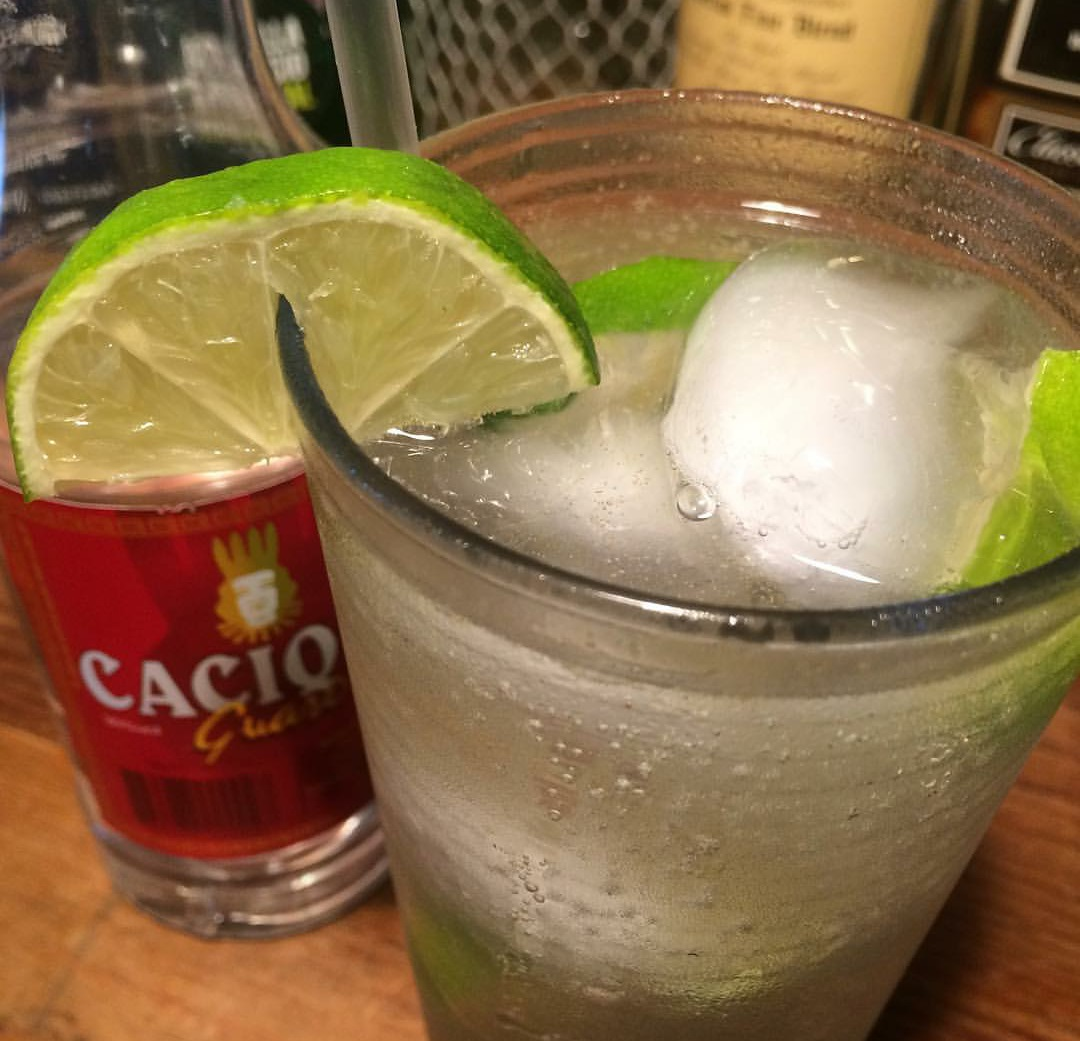
- Type: Guaro
- Manufacturer: Fábrica Nacional de Licores
- Distributor: FANAL
- Origin: Costa Rica
- Introduced: 1853
- Alcohol by volume: 30%
- Proof (US): 60
- Colour: Clear
- Website: FANAL

Cacique Guaro is a brand of guaro produced by Fábrica Nacional de Licores or "FANAL". Cacique Guaro is a sugar cane-based liquor of high purity and is the best-selling distilled spirit in Costa Rica. It is known as "Costa Rican liqueur". As it has a neutral taste, guaro can be consumed pure or combined with any natural or artificial mixing.

== History ==
Since its beginning in 1853, the National Liquor Factory has sold the liquor in barrels through liquor agencies. The agencies, in turn, placed it in bars and other outlets in the containers that clients provided. The alcohol content of liquor was 35%.

Since August 1980, FANAL has marketed the liquor in a one-liter glass bottle with a low ABV of 30% under the name of Guaro Cacique. Cacique is also available in 750 ml glass bottles and 365 ml plastic bottles.

FANAL produces and uses in its beverages a licensed ethyl alcohol that is intended for drinking.

Fanal produces two guaro products known as Guaro Cacique (with a red label) and Cacique Superior (with a black label). The latter is 35% ABV, or 70 proof. Its design is based on high purity rubbing alcohol and subjected to further purification, in which the liquor is filtered through activated carbon to increase its purity and perfect its aroma.

=== Origin of the name ===
Guaro is a term used in Central America to refer to a traditional alcohol distilled from sugar cane. The word "cacique" (a word originating from Taíno or Arawak languages) means "chief of the tribe" in Spanish. Another factor contributing to renaming the product "cacique guaro" was an excavation made by the National Museum on land currently occupied by FANAL, where the archeologists discovered the largest known indigenous settlement to date in the canton of Grecia. The excavation took place from 1977 to 1980.

The drink is nicknamed "cuatro plumas", meaning "four feathers", and refers to the cacique wearing four feathers on the label.

== Production process ==
The process of making the product begins with the raw material called pre-processed alcohol, which FANAL receives mainly from mills in the area of Guanacaste. The alcohol passes into the distillate area where it begins preparation, through columns whose primary function is to purify vinasse. Once purified, the alcohol is passed to the storage area.

== Bottling ==
- The end product is received in the machines that handle fillers to complete the filling.
- A capping machine places caps on the containers.
- A machine adheres the label.
- A machine deposits the glass or plastic bottles in plastic crates or cardboard for referral to the storage and shipping area.

== Storage and Shipping ==
The final product is stored in two warehouses called "Liquor Fine Winery" and "Common Spirits Cellar" before being released for customer trucks or FANAL's own, which transports the finished product to customer proprietary or vendors.

== Types ==
- Cacique Guaro (bottled with a red label, 365 ml (popularly called "pacha"), 750 ml and 1000)
- Superior Cacique Guaro (bottled with a black label, 365 ml and 750 ml only)
- Roncolorado (bottled with a yellow label, 365 ml and 1000)
