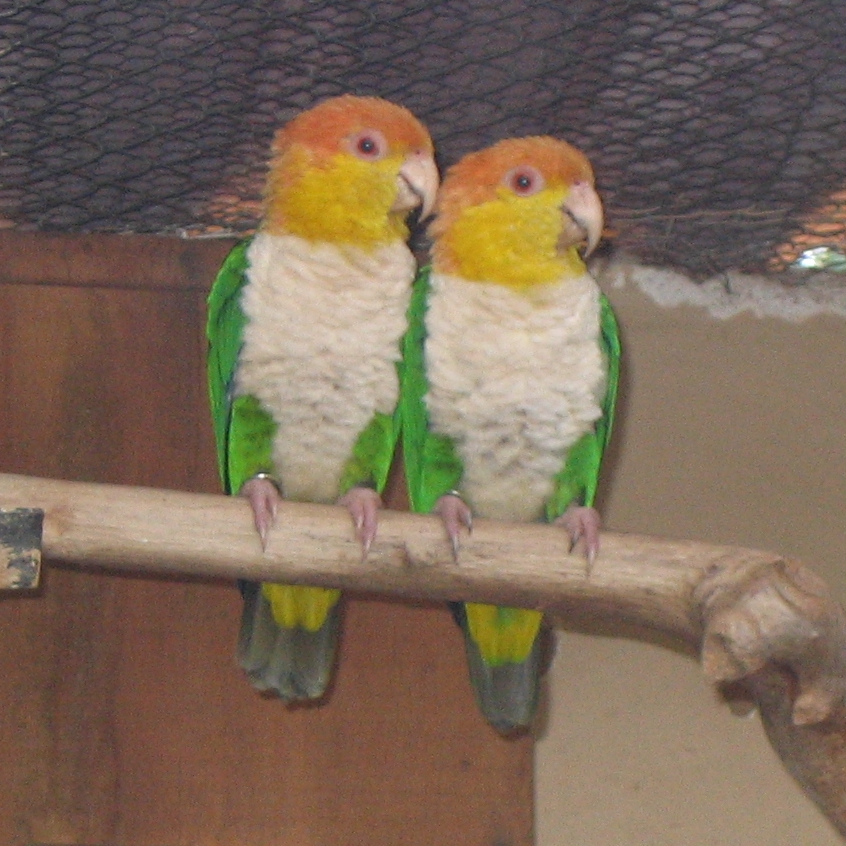

Conservation status
- Vulnerable (IUCN 3.1)
- CITES Appendix II

Scientific classification
- Kingdom: Animalia
- Phylum: Chordata
- Class: Aves
- Order: Psittaciformes
- Family: Psittacidae
- Genus: Pionites
- Species: P. leucogaster

Binomial name
- Pionites leucogaster (Kuhl, 1820)
- Range of P. l. leucogaster

= White-bellied parrot =

Species of bird

The white-bellied parrot (Pionites leucogaster), or white-bellied caique in aviculture, is a species of bird in the subfamily Arinae of the family Psittacidae, the African and New World parrots. It is found in Bolivia, Brazil, Colombia, and Peru.

== Taxonomy and systematics ==
The South American Classification Committee of the American Ornithological Society, the International Ornithological Committee, and the Clements taxonomy assign these three subspecies to the white-bellied parrot:

- P. l. xanthomerius (P.L. Sclater, 1858) (Black-legged parrot)
- P. l. xanthurus Todd, 1925 (Yellow-tailed parrot)
- P. l. leucogaster (Kuhl, 1820) (Green-thighed parrot)

BirdLife International's Handbook of the Birds of the World (HBW) treats all three as separate species, the "black-legged", "yellow-tailed", and "green-thighed" parrots respectively. The three have also been called the "western", "central", and "eastern" white-bellied parrots. Note that the range map is that of the nominate subspecies P. l. leucogaster.

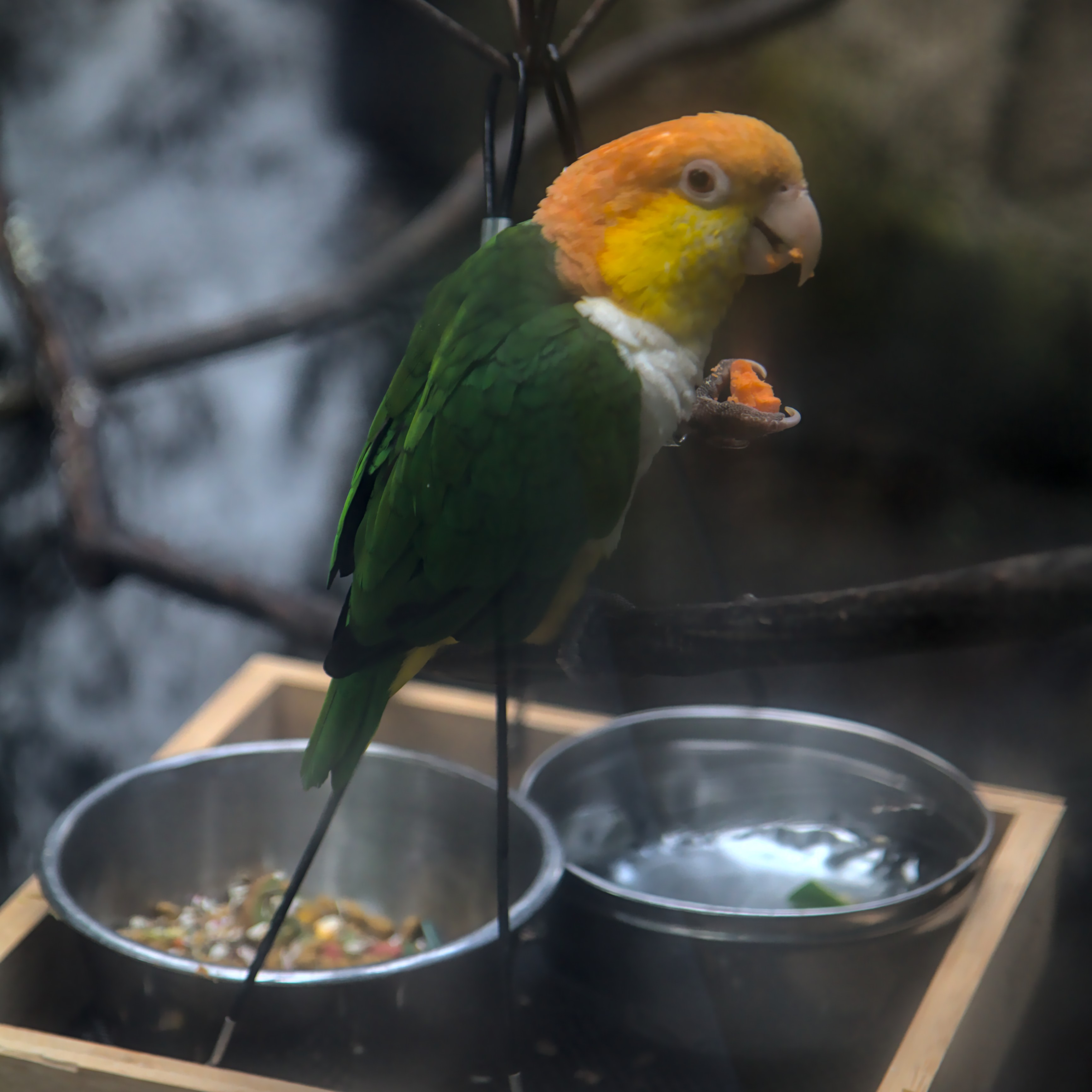
P. l. xanthomerius eating at Moody Gardens in Galveston, Texas

== Description ==
The white-bellied parrot is 23 to 25 cm (9.1 to 9.8 in) long and weighs about 155 g (5.5 oz). It is a chunky, short-tailed parrot. The sexes are the same. Adults of the nominate subspecies P. l. leucogaster have mostly yellow heads with orange crowns and napes. Their upperparts are mostly dull green with a bright green rump. Their throat, the sides of their neck, their breast, and their vent are yellow. Also, their lower breast and belly are white with bright green thigh feathers. Their wing is mostly dull green with reddish-orange axillaries and dark blue primaries. Their tail is bright green. Furthermore, their bill is pale horn colored with a bright pinkish cere, their iris reddish brown, and their legs and feet bright pink. Immature birds are similar to adults but with a brownish crown and nape.

Subspecies P. l. xanthomerius has an apricot-orange crown and nape, yellow thigh feathers, and blackish legs and feet. P. l. xanthurus also has an apricot-orange crown and nape and yellow thigh feathers. Its tail is yellow. It has the same pinkish legs and feet as the nominate. Both of these subspecies intergrade with each other and with the nominate.

The white breast feathers of the white-bellied parrot are often stained a chestnut brown (or "isobel") color. This may be due to tannin staining, as result of their particular affinity for bathing by rubbing their bodies against wet leaves and other plant matter. The head and nape plumage of the white-bellied parrot has been observed to fluoresce strongly under ultraviolet light.

== Distribution and habitat ==
The subspecies of the white-bellied parrot are found thus:

- P. l. xanthomerius, Peru east of the Ucayali River, eastern Bolivia, western Brazil south of the Amazon as far as the Juruá River, and since 2011 in extreme southeastern Colombia
- P. l. xanthurus, Brazil south of the Amazon between the Juruá and Purús rivers and south to the upper Madeira River basin
- P. l. leucogaster, northern Brazil south of the Amazon between the Madeira and the Atlantic coast in Maranhão

All three subspecies of the white-bellied parrot inhabit humid tropical forests, both terra firme and várzea. They seem to prefer the forest's edges and openings in it to the closed interior. The nominate subspecies is also found in small numbers in drier forests at the southern reaches of its range.

== Behavior ==
=== Movement ===
Nothing is known about the white-bellied parrot's movement patterns, if any.

=== Feeding ===
Little is known about the white-bellied parrot's foraging technique or diet, though the latter includes fruits of trees and palms and also flowers.

=== Breeding ===
The nominate subspecies of the white-bellied parrot nests between November and January; P. l. xanthomerius is thought to nest between August and December. Both nest in tree cavities. Their clutch size appears to be two to four eggs. Nothing further is known about their breeding biology. Nothing is known about that of P. l. xanthurus, though it is assumed to be essentially the same as that of the other two subspecies.

=== Vocalization ===
The white-bellied parrot's flight call is "a high-pitched, harsh, squealing "sqheee .. sqheee"." It also makes "from loud high-pitched "kree-ee-ee" or "skeeew" notes to more melodious whistles and subdued "kee-ah-u" or "kew" calls" when perched.

== Status ==
The IUCN follows HBW taxonomy and so has separately assessed the three subspecies of white-bellied parrot. The nominate "green-thighed" subspecies was originally rated as Endangered but since 2021 as Vulnerable. It has a large range but its population size is not known and is believed to be decreasing. It "is suffering from the loss, degradation and disturbance of its forested habitat, and may potentially be susceptible to hunting." The "black-legged" P. l. xanthomerius is assessed as being of Least Concern. Like the nominate, it has a large range but its population size is not known and is believed to be decreasing. The primary threat is deforestation for farming and ranching. The "yellow-tailed" P. l. xanthurus is also assessed as being of Least Concern. It has a smaller range than the other two subspecies; like them, its population size is not known and is believed to be decreasing. As for xanthomerius, deforestation for farming and ranching is the principal threat.
