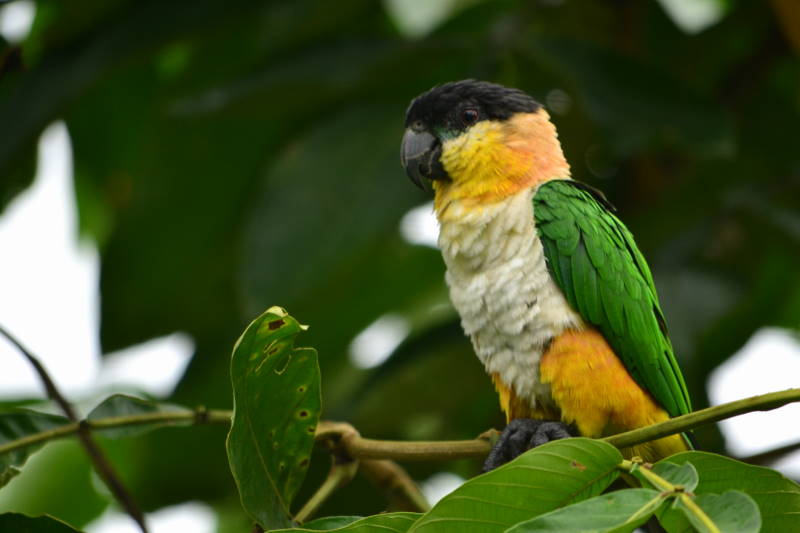
- Black-headed parrot (Pionites melanocephalus), Yasuní, Ecuador

Scientific classification
- Kingdom: Animalia
- Phylum: Chordata
- Class: Aves
- Order: Psittaciformes
- Family: Psittacidae
- Subfamily: Arinae
- Genus: Pionites; Heine, 1890

Type species
- Psittacus melanocephalus Linnaeus, 1758

Species
- Pionites melanocephalus; Pionites leucogaster; Pionites leucogaster leucogaster; Pionites leucogaster xanthomerius; Pionites leucogaster xanthurus
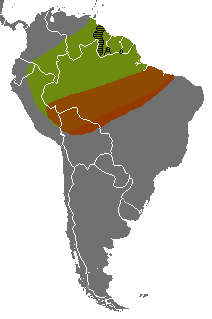
- Ranges of black-headed parrot (green) and white-bellied parrot complex overlap

= Caique =

Caiques

Species of bird

Caique (/kaɪˈiːk/ or /kɑːˈiːk/) refers to two to four species of parrots in the genus Pionites endemic to the Amazon Basin in South America.

== Name ==
The term "caique" is primarily used in aviculture, with ornithologists typically referring to them as the black-headed parrot and white-bellied parrot, the latter of which is sometimes further split into three separate species, green-thighed parrot, yellow-tailed parrot and black-legged parrot. They have historically been called the "seven-colored parrot". They are relatively small and stocky, with a short, square tail and bright colors. The ultimate origin of the name is uncertain. The name was introduced into French ornithological nomenclature as "caïca" by Georges-Louis Leclerc, Comte de Buffon in 1779. Buffon stated in his 1779 work entitled "Histoire naturelle des oiseaux", a part of his "Histoire naturelle" series, that the name was adopted from the Galibi (Kalina) language where Buffon states it was used to refer to the birds.

== Description ==
The two species are best distinguished by the black-headed parrot's black crown; both have white "bellies". Their typical weight is 130–180 grams, with the white-bellied species being the larger and heavier of the two species. They usually live around 25-30 years in captivity, but some live up to 35-40 years.

== Distribution and habitat ==
The black-headed caique is found north of the Amazon River, and the white-bellied caique south; there is a large area of overlap between ranges. They can produce fertile hybrids, but this is not common in the wild as it is in captivity. They generally prefer forested areas and subsist on fruit and seeds. Caiques are generally canopy dwellers, spending most of their time in the tops of trees, foraging and playing.

== Taxonomy and systematics ==
The genus Pionites is classified as two species, the black-headed parrot and white-bellied parrot. Some recent morphological work has suggested that the white-bellied parrot should be split into three species based on plumage and leg coloration, though this has not been accepted by either the IOC World Bird List, or the South American Classification Committee. In the past these parrots were often allied with the conures or other South American parakeets. Recent mitochondrial and nuclear DNA work has found Pionites to be the sister taxon to the Deroptyus (the genus that contains the red-fan parrot); the two genera occupy a basal position in the tribe Arini.

Pionites
Common name (Scientific name) Status	Image	Description	Region and habitat
White-bellied parrot (Green-thighed parrot) (Pionites leucogaster leucogaster); Vulnerable		About 23 cm (9.1 in) long. Mostly green and pink feet; apricot-orange cap; a medium, stout parrot.	Amazon region of Brazil Lives in lowland humid tropical and seasonally flooded forest.
White-bellied parrot (Yellow-tailed parrot) (Pionites leucogaster xanthurus); Least concern		About 23 cm (9.1 in) long. Similar to the black-legged parrot, but yellow tail and pink feet.	Amazon region of southern Brazil Lives in lowland humid tropical and seasonally flooded forest.
White-bellied parrot (Black-legged parrot) (Pionites leucogaster xanthomerius); Least concern		About 23 cm (9.1 in) long. Similar to the green-thighed subspecies of white-bellied parrot, but yellow-thighs and blackish feet.	Parts of Bolivia, Peru and Brazil Prefers seasonally flooded forest.
Black-headed parrot (Pionites melanocephalus); Least concern		About 23 cm (9.1 in) long. Mostly green, with yellow thighs with hints of orange; blackish feet; black cap with a black bill; a medium, chunky parrot.	Parts of Colombia, Venezuela, the Guianas, Peru, and Brazil Lives in lowland humid tropical and seasonally flooded forest.

== Natural history ==
=== Behavior and ecology ===
These parrots are found in the edges of forests and secondary-growth forests. They usually forage on at higher levels in the canopy, although they can also be found lower at forest edges. At least two members of the flock act as sentries during feeding time. Their diet consists of flowers, fruit, pulp, and seeds, although in captivity they are known to eat insects. Depending on the species and the location, they can breed from October to May at various times of the year. Caiques are high-nesting cavity birds and roost communally. They exhibit pack-like behavior when defending against threats. This may help to explain their relative self-confidence, compared to other parrots. Caiques are also known to form ad-hoc defensive committees in response to predators. The number of the flock is usually around 10 to 30 individuals. White-bellied caiques in the Tambopata National Reserve have been observed to be geophagous.

The species of the white-bellied parrot complex is found in humid forest and wooded habitats in the Amazon south of the Amazon River in Bolivia, Brazil, and Peru. It is generally fairly common throughout its range and is easily seen in a wide range of protected areas, such as the Manú National Park and Tambopata-Candamo in Peru, Cristalino State Park (near Alta Floresta), Xingu National Park and Amazônia National Park in Brazil, and Madidi National Park in Bolivia.

The black-headed parrot is found in forest (especially, but not exclusively, humid) and nearby wooded habitats in the Amazon north of the Amazon River and west of the Ucayali River in Brazil, northern Bolivia, Colombia, Ecuador, French Guiana, Guyana, Peru, Suriname, and Venezuela. It is generally fairly common and occurs in many protected areas throughout its range.

Caiques have a few unique ways of moving. They "surf" (described below), "hop" (when excited or to move quickly without flying), and "shuffle" (often in a rapid, backwards direction). They flip their wings rapidly, which exposes their red/orange patch under the wing, to potentially communicate to one another or other animals. They make different types of "purring" noises; some express wariness, others interest. They purr quietly when enjoying a drink. A startle call causes all caiques in the vicinity to take flight in random directions regardless of the initiator. A sound resembling a dead battery on a smoke detector is the typical contact call for the black-headed parrot.

When highly stimulated, caiques pin and flash their pupils, making their emotional state obvious. They are likely to attack and bite when displaying pinning and/or flashing eyes. Caiques are highly vocal and can inflict severely damaging bites. Caiques' wing feathers produce a distinctive whirring sound in flight.

=== Aviculture ===
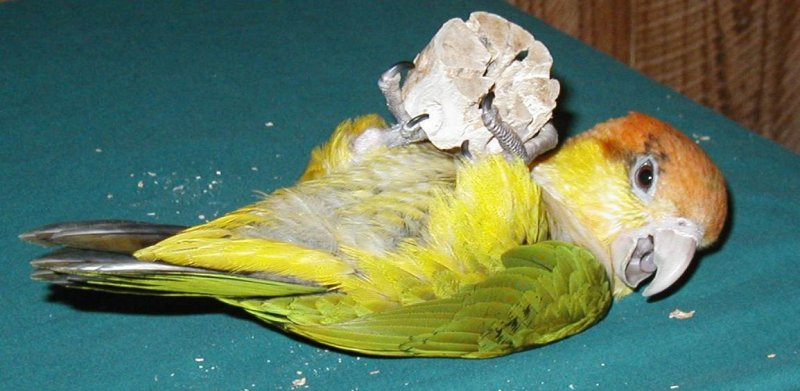
Juvenile white-bellied caique on back playing

Caiques are growing in popularity in aviculture. The more commonly found species is the black-headed caique since it was introduced first in captivity, but the white-bellied caique's popularity is growing rapidly. Well-raised caiques bond well with humans and have a reputation as playful and energetic birds that enjoy playing with toys and lying on their backs. These birds sometimes perform a behavior unusual for avian species in which they roll over on their backs in apparent play-fighting with other caiques—sometimes called "wrestling". They are not particularly good flyers, becoming tired and winded after only a short distance. They also tend to be clumsy and slow in the air compared to other birds. They often prefer to walk, jump, climb, ride other animals' backs, or hop as a mode of transportation. They are excellent climbers, with very strong feet and legs.

Caiques also exhibit a unique behavior known as "surfing", where the bird will vigorously rub its face, wings and chest against any nearby soft item (e.g. carpets, towels, cushions, crumpled paper, curtains or human hair) while using its beak to pull itself along. The bird will display jerky movements and may roll over several times. This behavior is thought to be a cleaning or bathing motion and occurs regardless of age or sex. In the wild, caiques use wet leaves for this behavior.

In captivity caiques are capable of breeding at under three years of age. They typically lay a clutch of four eggs, with incubation taking between 24 and 27 days. Most pairs will struggle to raise all four chicks; often the last chick to hatch will not survive unless it is taken for hand-rearing or co-parenting. Chicks are fed by both parents and remain in the nest box for approximately 70–75 days. Parents can be very affectionate towards their offspring and after the chicks have fledged they will return to the nest box each night with their parents where the family will roost as a group.

== Conservation ==
The nominal species of black-headed caique and white-bellied caique are listed on Appendix 2 of CITES as a species of Least Concern but subspecies are more endangered; in reality, data is insufficient as with many parrots.
