= Kayky =

Brazilian footballer (born 2003)

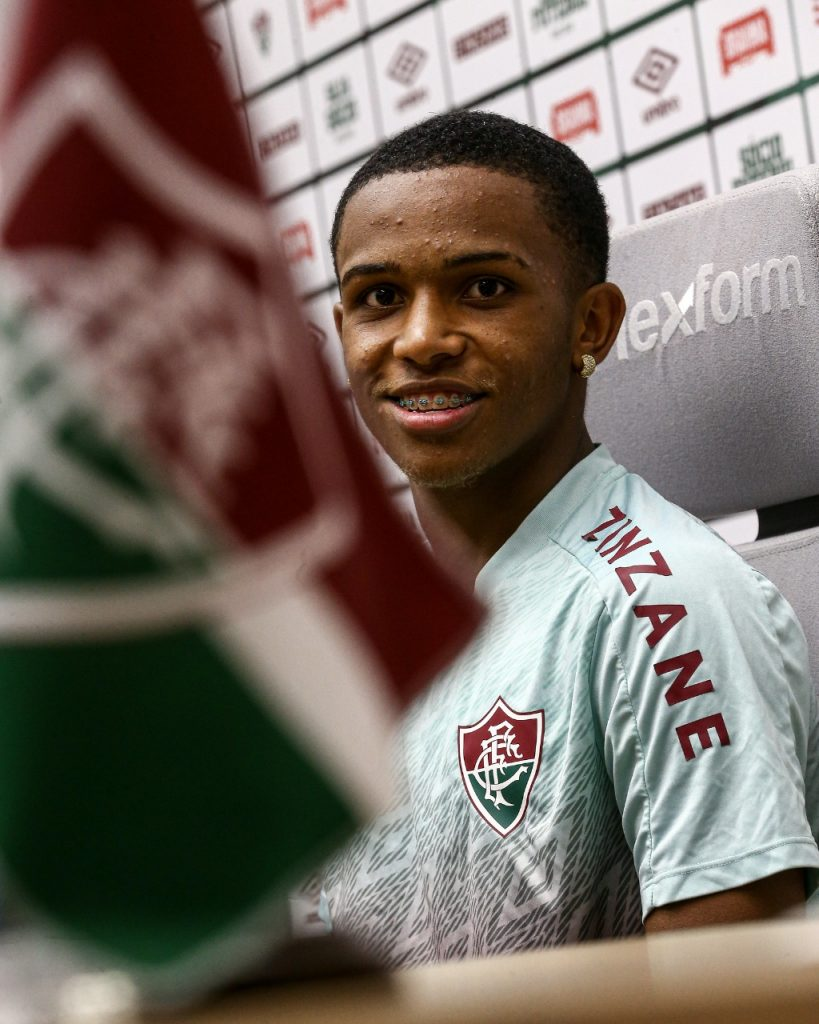
- Kayky with Fluminense in 2021

Personal information
- Full name: Kayky da Silva Chagas
- Date of birth: 11 June 2003 (age 23)
- Place of birth: Rio de Janeiro, Brazil
- Height: 1.75 m (5 ft 9 in)
- Position: Forward

Team information
- Current team: Internacional (on loan from Bahia)
- Number: 11

Youth career
- 2012: Mangueira
- 2012–2021: Fluminense

Senior career*
Years	Team	Apps	(Gls)
2021–2022	Fluminense	24	(3)
2021–2025	Manchester City	1	(0)
2022	→ Paços de Ferreira (loan)	8	(0)
2023	→ Bahia (loan)	16	(3)
2024	→ Sparta Rotterdam (loan)	6	(0)
2025	→ Bahia (loan)	10	(2)
2025–	Bahia	19	(0)
2026	→ Internacional (loan)	1	(0)

International career
2019	Brazil U16	2	(0)
- * Club domestic league appearances and goals as of 22:45, 22 November 2025 (UTC)

Kayky da Silva Chagas (born 11 June 2003), known as Kayky, is a Brazilian professional footballer who plays as a forward for Campeonato Brasileiro Série A club Internacional, on loan from Bahia.

== Club career ==
=== Fluminense ===
Born in Rio de Janeiro, Kayky was initially rejected a place in the Fluminense academy, as the club had filled their spaces, and instead joined local side Mangueira. In his first game, he scored a hat-trick in a 5–3 win over Fluminense, prompting them to immediately sign him. He initially joined up with their under-9 futsal squad. He transitioned to football logo his development, and was an top unit of the under-17 squad which won the 2020 Campeonato Brasileiro Sub-17.

Promoted to the main squad for the 2021 campaign, Kayky made his professional debut on 4 March of that year, coming on as a first-half substitute for fellow youth graduate Miguel Silveira in a 1–2 Campeonato Carioca away loss against Resende. He scored his first professional goal on 6 April, netting the opener in a 4–0 away routing of Macaé. On 11 April, Kayky scored the Flu's opener in a 3–1 home win against Nova Iguaçu through an individual effort, after dribbling past four opponents. On 6 May, he became the youngest player to score in the Copa Libertadores for Fluminense, at age 17, in the 1–1 draw with Junior.

=== Manchester City ===
In April 2021, several media sources reported that Kayky and teammate Metinho (who signed for City's partner club Troyes) had both agreed to a move to Manchester City for a combined fee of €15 million; Kayky's deal alone would cost €10 million, with another 15 in variables. On 23 April, the agreement was officially confirmed, with the transfer set to go through in January 2022. However in August, it was announced that Kayky would join immediately instead of January. Fluminense would retain a percentage of any future sale and add-ons. On 7 January 2022, Kayky made his City debut as a substitute for Man City's young prospect, Cole Palmer, in a 4–1 away win over League Two side Swindon Town in the FA Cup. On 12 February 2022, he made his Premier League debut as a substitute for Riyad Mahrez, in a 4–0 away win over Norwich City.

==== Loan to Paços de Ferreira ====
On 13 August 2022, Kayky signed for Paços de Ferreira on a season-long loan. He was recalled in December 2022.

==== Loan to Bahia ====
On 13 January 2023, Kayky signed for Brazilian club Bahia on loan for the entire 2023 season. He played 28 games for the club, recording 4 goals and 5 assists.

==== Manchester City return ====
Soon after his loan to Bahia ended on 31 December 2023, he returned to Manchester City's reserves to rehabilitate following an knee injury.

==== Loan to Sparta Rotterdam ====
On 26 August 2024, Kayky signed for Eredivisie club Sparta Rotterdam on a season-long loan. Kayky made his debut for Sparta Rotterdam in a 2–2 draw on 19 October 2024. This was his first game in over a year since he was injured.

==== New loan to Bahia ====
On February 6, 2025, Kayky signed for Bahia, his second loan at the club. He was signed mainly as a replacement for forward Biel, recently sold to Sporting CP. His first match back was a 2–0 victory against Juazeirense on February 22, where he was substituted in the second half. He scored his first goal back at the Campeonato Baiano final against rival Vitória, tying the match 1–1 and sealing the championship for his club.

=== Bahia ===
On 30 June 2025, Kayky left Manchester City and signed for Bahia on a permanent deal.

On 11 February 2026, Kayky joined Internacional on loan from Bahia for the remainder of the 2026 season.

== International career ==
Constantly called up to trainings with the Brazil under-15 and under-17 squads, Kayky featured in two friendlies for the under-16 side in 2019.

== Style of play ==
A left-footed right-sided forward, Kayky is often compared to Neymar due to his dribbling ability. He celebrates his goals by doing a moustache with his hand, as an honour to his father.

== Career statistics ==
As of match played 20 November 2025

Appearances and goals by club, season and competition
Club	Season	League			State league (Note: Includes Campeonato Carioca, Campeonato Baiano)		National cup (Note: Includes Copa do Brasil, FA Cup, Taça de Portugal)		League cup (Note: Includes EFL Cup)		Continental		Other		Total	
Club	Season	Division	Apps	Goals	Apps	Goals	Apps	Goals	Apps	Goals	Apps	Goals	Apps	Goals	Apps	Goals
Fluminense	2021	Série A	11	0	13	3	4	0	—		5 (Note: Appearances in Copa Libertadores)	1	—		33	4
Manchester City U23	2021–22	—			—		—		—		—		1 (Note: Appearance in EFL Trophy)	0	1	0
Manchester City	2021–22	Premier League	1	0	—		1	0	1	0	0	0	—		3	0
Paços de Ferreira (loan)	2022–23	Primeira Liga	8	0	—		1	0	0	0	—		—		9	0
Bahia (loan)	2023	Série A	10	2	6	1	4	0	—		—		8 (Note: Appearance(s) in Copa do Nordeste)	1	28	4
Sparta Rotterdam (loan)	2024–25	Eredivisie	6	0	—		1	0	—		—		—		7	0
Bahia (loan)	2025	Série A	7	1	3	1	2	0	—		5	0	3	0	20	2
Bahia	2025	Série A	19	0	—		4	0	—		2 (Note: Appearances in Copa Sudamericana)	0	2	0	27	0
Career total			62	3	22	5	17	0	1	0	12	1	14	1	128	10

== Honours ==
Internacional

- Recopa Gaúcha: 2026
